= List of 2019–20 RFU Championship transfers =

This is a list of player transfers involving RFU Championship teams before or during the 2019–20 season. The list is of deals that are confirmed and are either from or to a rugby union team in the Championship during the 2018–19 season. It is not unknown for confirmed deals to be cancelled at a later date. On 19 April 2019, London Irish are promoted to the Premiership Rugby whilst Newcastle Falcons are relegated to the RFU Championship for the 2019–20 season. Ampthill are promoted to the RFU Championship, whilst Richmond are relegated to National League 1 for the 2019–20 season.

== Ampthill ==
=== Players In ===
- (England) Kwaku Asiedu from (England) Coventry
- (England) Dave Ward from (England) Harlequins
- (England) Darryl Veenendaal from (England) Nottingham
- (England) Louis Grimoldby from (France) Massy
- (England) Shay Kerry from (France) Oyonnax
- (Argentina) Serafin Bordoli from (Italy) Calvisano
- (Argentina) Facundo Dominguez from (Argentina) Bueno Aires
- (South Africa) Jarryd Sage from (Wales) Dragons
- (Wales) Henri Williams from (Wales) Dragons

=== Players Out ===
- (England) Karl Garside to (England) Northampton Saints
- (Tonga) Paino Hehea retired
- (Canada) James Pritchard retired
- (England) Jack Culverhouse to (England) Cambridge

== Bedford Blues ==
=== Players In ===
- (New Zealand) Dan Temm from (England) Yorkshire Carnegie
- (Hong Kong) Matt Worley from (England) Northampton Saints
- (England) Joe Atkinson from (England) Wasps
- (Scotland) Grayson Hart from (England) London Scottish
- (Scotland) Robbie Smith from (Scotland) Glasgow Warriors
- (England) Joe Wrafter from (England) Birmingham Moseley
- (England) Sam Leeming from (England) Hartpury College
- (England) Jordan Onojaife from (England) Ealing Trailfinders
- (England) Alex Gliksten from (England) Saracens
- (England) Charlie Reed from (England) Loughborough Students RUFC
- (England) Henry Paul from (England) Esher
- (Samoa) Alafoti Fa'osiliva from (England) Worcester Warriors

=== Players Out ===
- (England) Lee Dickson retired
- (England) Ben Cooper to (England) Bury St Edmunds
- (England) Camilo Parilli-Ocampo to (England) Chinnor
- (Ireland) Mark Flanagan retired
- (England) Harry Sheppard to (England) London Scottish
- (England) Hayden King to (England) Cornish Pirates
- (England) Charlie Clare to (England) Leicester Tigers
- (Wales) Jarad Williams to (England) Sale FC
- (England) Alex Rae retired
- (Wales) Chris Czekaj to (Wales) Merthyr
- (England) Jake Sharp retired
- (Canada) Justin Blanchet released
- (England) Joe Britton released

== Cornish Pirates ==
=== Players In ===
- (Argentina) Nicolas de Battista from (Italy) Zebre
- (England) Jay Tyack from (England) Birmingham Moseley
- (Scotland) Ruaridh Dawson from (England) Newcastle Falcons
- (Wales) Rhodri Davies from (Wales) Dragons
- (England) Sam Rodman from Jersey Reds
- (England) Hayden King from (England) Bedford Blues
- (Ireland) Cian Romaine from (England) Yorkshire Carnegie
- (England) Harry Davey from (England) Yorkshire Carnegie
- (Wales) Jean-Baptiste Bruzulier from (England) Yorkshire Carnegie
- (New Zealand) Antonio Kiri Kiri from (England) Yorkshire Carnegie
- (Samoa) Fa'atiga Lemalu from (England) Yorkshire Carnegie
- (Wales) Craig Mitchell from (England) Yorkshire Carnegie
- (New Zealand) Shae Tucker from (New Zealand) Hawke's Bay
- (England) Suva Ma'asi from (England) Peterborough Lions

=== Players Out ===
- (England) Christian Judge to (England) Bath
- (England) Toby Freeman to (England) Harlequins
- (England) Alex Day to (England) Saracens
- (New Zealand) Dan Koster to (England) Hartpury College
- (England) Tom Concu to (England) Old Elthamians
- (England) Dan Lee to (England) Taunton
- (New Zealand) Jake Ashby to (England) Chinnor
- (England) Tyler Gendall retired
- (Georgia (country)) Nodar Tcheishvili released
- (New Zealand) Jordan Payne released

== Coventry ==
=== Players In ===
- (Wales) Gerard Ellis from (Wales) Dragons
- (Wales) Will Owen from (England) Doncaster Knights
- (England) Rory Jennings from (England) London Scottish
- (England) Ryan Burrows from (England) Newcastle Falcons
- (Fiji) Senitiki Nayalo from (Scotland) Edinburgh
- (England) James Voss from (England) Leicester Tigers
- (England) Gareth Denman from (England) Gloucester
- (England) Dan Lewis promoted from Academy
- (England) Scott Russell promoted from Academy
- (England) Will Flinn promoted from Academy
- (England) Andy Forsyth from (England) Yorkshire Carnegie
- (England) Joe Buckle from (England) Yorkshire Carnegie
- (England) David Langley from (England) Wasps
- (England) Luke Wallace from (England) Harlequins
- (England) Henry Purdy from (England) Gloucester
- (England) Louis Brown from (England) Old Elthamians

=== Players Out ===
- (England) Nathaniel Titchard-Jones to (England) Birmingham Moseley
- (England) Ben Palmer to (England) Birmingham Moseley
- (England) Charlie Beech to (England) Doncaster Knights
- (England) Biyi Alo to (England) Wasps
- (New Zealand) Sam Tuitupou retired
- (England) Phil Nilsen retired
- (England) Jack Preece to (England) Hartpury College
- (England) Tom Jubb to (England) Hartpury College
- (Tonga) Latu Makaafi to (England) Hull
- (England) James Neal to (England) Hinckley
- (England) Willie Priestley to (England) Cambridge
- (England) Kwaku Asiedu to (England) Ampthill
- (England) Louis Roach to (England) Birmingham Moseley
- (England) Joe Lane to (England) Darlington Mowden Park
- (England) Cameron Gray to (England) Chinnor
- (Tonga) Daniel Faleafa to (United States) Austin Elite
- (England) Isaac McNulty to (Scotland) Ayr
- (England) Henry Purdy to (England) Bristol Bears
- (England) Dave Brazier released
- (England) Tarik Tin released

== Doncaster Knights ==
=== Players In ===
- (England) Matt Smith from (England) Yorkshire Carnegie
- (England) Sam Olver from (England) Ealing Trailfinders
- (England) Charlie Beech from (England) Coventry
- (Wales) Jack Roberts from (Wales) Cardiff Blues
- (England) Andrew Foster from (England) Yorkshire Carnegie
- (England) Cameron Cowell from (England) Newcastle Falcons
- (England) Pete Lucock from (England) Yorkshire Carnegie
- (England) George Edgson from (England) Ealing Trailfinders
- (Scotland) Reiss Cullen from (England) Bristol Bears
- (Wales) Kyle Evans from (Wales) Merthyr
- (Wales) Marc Thomas from (England) Yorkshire Carnegie

=== Players Out ===
- (Samoa) Josh Tyrell to (France) Oyonnax
- (Wales) Will Owen to (England) Coventry
- (England) Richard List retired
- (England) Paul Jarvis to (England) Doncaster Phoenix
- (England) Mat Clark to (England) Nottingham
- (England) Elliott Creed to (England) London Scottish
- (England) David Nelson to (England) Darlington Mowden Park
- (England) Paul Jarvis to (England) Darlington Mowden Park
- (Ireland) Willie Ryan to (England) Chinnor
- (Germany) Toby Williams to (England) Rotherham Titans
- (Wales) Marc Thomas to (England) Harlequins

== Ealing Trailfinders ==
=== Players In ===
- (Ireland) Craig Trenier from (England) Richmond
- (Wales) Steven Shingler from (France) Mont-de-Marsan
- (England) Nathan Fowles from (Scotland) Edinburgh
- (England) Jack Tovey from (England) Bristol Bears
- (England) Craig Hampson from (England) Wasps
- (England) Paul Davis from (England) Exeter Chiefs
- (Ireland) Shane Buckley from (England) Nottingham
- (New Zealand) Paul Grant from (England) Bath
- (England) Tommy Bell from (England) London Irish
- (Australia) Dave McKern from Jersey Reds
- (England) Oli Robinson from (England) Northumbria University
- (England) Jack Rouse from (England) University of Exeter
- (England) James Cannon from (Ireland) Connacht
- (England) Josh Pieterese from (England) University of Exeter
- (England) Ewan Fenley from (England) Gloucester
- (England) Cameron Terry from (England) Gloucester
- (England) Ryan Roach from (England) Birmingham Moseley
- (New Zealand) Elijah Niko from (England) Yorkshire Carnegie
- (England) Harry Seward from (Wales) Cardiff Metropolitan University
- (Australia) Adam Korczyk from (Australia) Queensland Reds

=== Players Out ===
- (England) Sam Olver to (England) Doncaster Knights
- (England) George Simpson to (England) Hartpury College (season-long loan)
- (Ireland) Ben Betts to (England) Nottingham (season-long loan)
- (England) George Edgson to (England) Doncaster Knights
- (England) Luke Carter to (England) Hartpury College
- (England) Jordan Onojaife to (England) Bedford Blues
- (Argentina) Segundo Tuculet to (Argentina) Los Tilos
- (Wales) Will Harries to (England) Chinnor
- (England) Mark Tampin to (England) Newcastle Falcons
- (England) Laurence May to (England) Chinnor
- (England) Max Davies to (England) Darlington Mowden Park
- (England) Howard Packman to (New Zealand) North Otago
- (England) Guy Armitage to (England) London Broncos
- (England) Matt Beesley to (England) Wharfedale
- (Australia) Rohan O'Regan to (Australia) Sydney University
- (Ireland) Ryan Foley released
- (United States) Ben Landry released
- (Ireland) Jack O'Connell released
- (England) Ben Williams released

== Hartpury College ==
=== Players In ===
- (England) Jack Preece from (England) Coventry
- (England) George Simpson from (England) Ealing Trailfinders (season-long loan)
- (England) Luke Carter from (England) Ealing Trailfinders
- (England) Tom Jubb from (England) Coventry
- (England) Seb Nagle-Taylor from (England) Rotherham Titans
- (England) Joshua Bragman from (England) University of Northumbria
- (England) Sam Goatley from (England) Clifton
- (New Zealand) Dan Koster from (England) Cornish Pirates
- (England) Will Safe from (England) Gloucester

=== Players Out ===
- (England) Ben Foley to (England) Nottingham
- (England) Sam Leeming to (England) Bedford Blues
- (England) Simon Linsell to (England) Gloucester
- (England) Ed Sheldon to (England) Cinderford
- (England) Luke Boon to (England) Old Elthamians
- (England) Aquile Smith to (England) Birmingham Moseley
- (England) Will Biggs to (England) Birmingham Moseley

== Jersey Reds ==
=== Players In ===
- (New Zealand) Liam Howley from (New Zealand) Southland
- (New Zealand) Liam Hallam-Eames from (New Zealand) Manawatu
- (Ireland) Alex Thompson from (Ireland) Ulster
- (Wales) Luc Jones from (England) Richmond
- (England) Dan Richardson from (England) Rotherham Titans
- (Scotland) George Spencer from (Scotland) Edinburgh Academical
- (England) Antonio Harris from (England) Wasps
- (England) George Willmott from Jersey Athletic
- (England) Brendan Cope from (England) Yorkshire Carnegie
- (New Zealand) Greg Dyer from (Spain) Valladolid RAC
- (Wales) Tom Williams from (Wales) Cardiff Blues
- (England) Josh Bainbridge from (England) Yorkshire Carnegie
- (Australia) Sam Offer from (Australia) Western Force
- (Australia) James Wayland from (Australia) Southern Districts

=== Players Out ===
- (England) Brett Herron to (England) Harlequins
- (England) Nick Selway to (England) Chinnor
- (Australia) Dave McKern to (England) Ealing Trailfinders
- (England) Sam Rodman to (England) Cornish Pirates
- (Ireland) Jerry Sexton to (South Africa) Southern Kings
- (Wales) Josh Hodson to (England) Chinnor
- (New Zealand) Adam Batt to (England) Old Elthamians
- (England) George Eastwell to (England) Old Elthamians
- (South Africa) Cameron Holenstein to (England) Old Elthamians
- (South Africa) Jason Worrall to (England) Chinnor
- (England) Charlie Maddison to (England) Newcastle Falcons
- (South Africa) Graham Geldenhuys to (Scotland) Ayr
- (South Africa) Koch Marx released
- (Zimbabwe) Hilton Mudariki released

== London Scottish ==
=== Players In ===
- (Scotland) Lewis Wynne from (Scotland) Glasgow Warriors
- (Scotland) James Malcolm from (Scotland) Glasgow Warriors
- (England) Oliver Allsopp from (England) Birmingham Moseley
- (England) Luke Hibberd from (England) Caldy
- (Australia) Matt Gordon from (Australia) Easts Tigers
- (England) Harry Sheppard from (England) Bedford Blues
- (England) Dan Barnes from (England) Rosslyn Park
- (England) Xavier Valentine from (England) Leeds Beckett University
- (South Africa) Kyle Whyte from (France) Bayonne
- (England) Elliott Creed from (England) Doncaster Knights
- (Australia) Alex Toolis from (Japan) Kurita Water Gush
- (Wales) Matthew Davies from (England) Clifton
- (England) Ryan Eveleigh from (England) Leeds Beckett University
- (Scotland) Charlie Gowling from (France) Beziers
- (United States) Will Magie from (United States) Glendale Raptors
- (United States) Mike Te'o from (United States) San Diego Legion

=== Players Out ===
- (England) Rory Jennings to (England) Coventry
- (Scotland) Richie Vernon retired
- (Scotland) Grayson Hart to (England) Bedford Blues
- (Namibia) Tjiuee Uanivi to (France) Massy
- (South Africa) Richard Palframan to (England) Worcester Warriors
- (England) Theo Vukasinovic to (England) Wasps
- (Papua New Guinea) Henari Veratau retired
- (England) Ben Mosses to (France) Stade Niçois
- (United States) Dino Waldren to (United States) San Diego Legion
- (England) Peter Austin to (England) Birmingham Moseley
- (South Africa) Jared Saunders to (England) Old Elthamians
- (Wales) Matt Marley to (England) Chinnor
- (England) Jimmy Litchfield to (England) Richmond
- (Australia) Byron Hodge to (England) Richmond
- (United States) Will Magie to (United States) Austin Gilgronis
- (England) Bradley Clements released
- (Scotland) Matt Davidson released
- (United States) Mike Te'o to (United States) San Diego Legion

== Newcastle Falcons ==
=== Players In ===
- (United States) Greg Peterson from (France) Bordeaux
- (England) Josh Basham from (England) Durham University
- (England) Darren Barry from (England) Worcester Warriors
- (Wales) Gareth Owen from (England) Leicester Tigers
- (England) Toby Salmon from (England) Exeter Chiefs
- (England) Mark Tampin from (England) Ealing Trailfinders
- (England) Jamie Blamire promoted from Academy
- (England) Adam Radwan promoted from Academy
- (England) Simon Uzokwe promoted from Academy
- (Tonga) Cooper Vuna from (England) Bath
- (South Africa) Sebastian de Chaves from (England) London Irish
- (South Africa) Philip van der Walt from (South Africa) Sharks
- (England) Charlie Maddison from (England) Jersey Reds
- (England) Mike Daniels from (England) Nottingham

=== Players Out ===
- (France) Sami Mavinga to (France) Stade Français Paris
- (Scotland) Andrew Davidson to (Scotland) Glasgow Warriors
- (Portugal) Pedro Bettencourt to (France) Oyonnax
- (England) Will Witty to (England) Exeter Chiefs
- (Scotland) Glen Young to (England) Harlequins
- (England) Cameron Cowell to (England) Doncaster Knights
- (England) Ryan Burrows to (England) Coventry
- (Scotland) Ruaridh Dawson to (England) Cornish Pirates
- (England) Calum Green to (England) Leicester Tigers
- (Argentina) Santiago Socino to (Argentina) Jaguares
- (England) Simon Hammersley to (England) Sale Sharks
- (Scotland) Chris Harris to (England) Gloucester
- (England) Zach Kibirige to (England) Wasps
- (England) Mark Wilson to (England) Sale Sharks (season-long loan)
- (Fiji) Vereniki Goneva to (England) Harlequins
- (Fiji) Tevita Cavubati to (England) Harlequins
- (Fiji) Josh Matavesi to (England) Bath Rugby
- (Tonga) Sonatane Takulua to (France) Toulon
- (England) Tom Penny to (England) Harlequins
- (Australia) Jack Payne released
- (England) David Wilson released
- (South Africa) Sebastian de Chaves to (England) London Irish

== Nottingham ==
=== Players In ===
- (England) Ben Foley from (England) Hartpury College
- (New Zealand) Tom Hill from (England) Yorkshire Carnegie
- (Ireland) Ben Betts from (England) Ealing Trailfinders (season-long loan)
- (England) Billy Walker from (England) Saracens
- (England) Mat Clark from (England) Doncaster Knights
- (England) Harry Strong from (England) Exeter Chiefs
- (Australia) Alex Dolly from (England) Rotherham Titans
- (England) Jesse Liston from (England) Richmond
- (England) Tom Benjamin from (Wales) Cardiff Metropolitan University
- (Ireland) James Connolly from (Ireland) Connacht
- (Fiji) Ifereimi Boladau from (England) British Army
- (England) Callum Allen from (England) Gloucester

=== Players Out ===
- (Ireland) Shane Buckley to (England) Ealing Trailfinders
- (England) Joe Cobden retired
- (England) Billy Robinson retired
- (New Zealand) James Penman retired
- (Ireland) Rory Burke to (Ireland) Connacht
- (England) Ben Davis-Moore to (England) Luctonians
- (Ireland) Jordan Coghlan to (England) Leicester Tigers
- (Ireland) Alex Goble to (England) Old Elthamians
- (England) Darryl Veenendaal to (England) Ampthill
- (England) Mike Daniels to (England) Newcastle Falcons

== Yorkshire Carnegie ==
=== Players In ===
- (England) Joe Ford from (England) Leicester Tigers
- (Tonga) Sione Faletau from (England) Bristol Bears
- (England) James Flynn from (England) Sale Sharks
- (England) Jake Brady from (England) Darlington Mowden Park
- (England) Ben Sowrey from (England) Wharfedale
- (England) Tom Varndell from (Hong Kong) South China Tigers
- (Australia) Conor Davidson from (Australia) Manly
- (Wales) Alex Humfrey from (Australia) Manly
- (Germany) Jarrid Els from (Germany) Heidelberger RK
- (England) James Elliott from (England) Leeds Beckett University
- (Wales) Trystan Lloyd unattached
- (England) Andrew Lawson from (England) Harrogate
- (Ireland) Zach Kerr from (Ireland) Bangor
- (England) Ed Bloodworth from (England) Northumbria University
- (England) Tom Whitehurst from (England) Esher
- (England) Tim Bitirim from (England) Cambridge
- (Australia) Elliot Turner from (Australia) Western Force
- (England) James Robins from (England) Chester
- (England) Joe Carlisle from (England) Old Elthamians
- (England) Callum Bustin from (England) Bradford Bulls
- (England) Lee Smith from (England) Bradford Bulls
- (England) Ryan Shaw from (England) Hull KR

=== Players Out ===
- (England) Richard Beck retired
- (England) Matt Smith to (England) Doncaster Knights
- (England) Chris Elder to (England) Chinnor
- (New Zealand) Dan Temm to (England) Bedford Blues
- (England) Andrew Foster to (England) Doncaster Knights
- (England) Pete Lucock to (England) Doncaster Knights
- (England) Brendan Cope to Jersey Reds
- (New Zealand) Tom Hill to (England) Nottingham
- (England) Andy Forsyth to (England) Coventry
- (England) Joe Buckle to (England) Coventry
- (Ireland) Cian Romaine to (England) Cornish Pirates
- (England) Harry Davey to (England) Cornish Pirates
- (Canada) Jake Ilnicki to (United States) Seattle Seawolves
- (England) Josh Bainbridge to Jersey Reds
- (England) Ollie Fox to (England) Bath
- (England) Kieran Frost to (England) Rotherham Titans
- (England) Sam Allan to (England) Rotherham Titans
- (England) Tom Bullough to (England) Rotherham Titans
- (Wales) Jean-Baptiste Bruzulier to (England) Cornish Pirates
- (New Zealand) Antonio Kiri Kiri to (England) Cornish Pirates
- (Samoa) Fa'atiga Lemalu to (England) Cornish Pirates
- (Wales) Craig Mitchell to (England) Cornish Pirates
- (Wales) Marc Thomas to (England) Doncaster Knights
- (New Zealand) Elijah Niko to (England) Ealing Trailfinders
- (England) Sam Wolstenholme to (England) Wasps

== See also ==
- List of 2019–20 Premiership Rugby transfers
- List of 2019–20 Pro14 transfers
- List of 2019–20 Super Rugby transfers
- List of 2019–20 Top 14 transfers
- List of 2019–20 Major League Rugby transfers
