= List of 2018–19 RFU Championship transfers =

This is a list of player transfers involving RFU Championship teams before or during the 2018–19 season. The list is of deals that are confirmed and are either from or to a rugby union team in the Championship during the 2017–18 season. It is not unknown for confirmed deals to be cancelled at a later date. Bristol Bears won promotion to the Aviva Premiership from the 2018–19 season, whilst London Irish were relegated to the RFU Championship from the 2018–19 season. Coventry won promotion to the RFU Championship from the 2018–19 season, whilst Rotherham Titans are relegated to National League 1.

== Bedford Blues ==
=== Players In ===
- (England) Charlie Clare from (England) Northampton Saints
- (England) Hayden King from (England) Blackheath
- (England) Ollie Curry from (England) Ealing Trailfinders
- (England) Ed Coulson from (England) Hartpury College
- (Wales) Huw Worthington from (Wales) RGC 1404
- (England) Ryan Hutler from (England) Bishop's Strotford
- (Wales) Lewis Robling from (England) Ealing Trailfinders
- (Ireland) Mark Flanagan from (England) Saracens
- (England) Pat Tapley from (Australia) Warringah
- (England) Jamie Elliott from (England) Northampton Saints
- (Wales) Harry Davies from (England) Bath

=== Players Out ===
- (England) Tom Lindsay to (England) Bristol Bears
- (England) George Edgson to (England) Ealing Trailfinders
- (England) Howard Packman to (England) Ealing Trailfinders
- (England) Jordan Burns to (England) Ealing Trailfinders
- (Samoa) Paul Tupai retired
- (England) Michael Le Bourgeois to (England) Wasps
- (England) Ollie Dodge retired
- (Australia) Ben Adams to (England) Coventry
- (England) Ban Kelland to (England) Hartpury College
- (England) Dave Spelman to (England) Richmond
- (England) Elliot Clement-Hill to (England) Blackheath
- (England) Dan Lewis to (England) Coventry
- (England) Jamie Elliot to (Italy) Zebre

== Cornish Pirates ==
=== Players In ===
- (England) Robin Wedlake from (England) Plymouth Albion
- (England) Tyler Gendall from (England) Bristol Bears
- (Argentina) Javier Rojas from (Italy) Viadana
- (Ireland) Callum Patterson from (Ireland) Ulster
- (Wales) Alex Schwarz from (Wales) RGC 1404
- (England) Dan Frost from (England) Taunton
- (England) Maliq Holden from (England) Hartpury College
- (New Zealand) Jake Ashby from (England) Burys St Edmunds
- (England) Danny Cutmore from (England) Saracens
- (Ireland) Rory Parata from (Italy) Zebre
- (Georgia (country)) Nodar Tcheishvili from (France) Chambéry
- (New Zealand) Jordan Payne from (Japan) NEC Green Rockets
- (England) Tom Concu from (England) Caldy

=== Players Out ===
- (England) Paul Andrew retired
- (England) Laurence May to (England) Ealing Trailfinders
- (Argentina) Nicolas De Battista to (Italy) Zebre
- (England) Toby May retired
- (England) Mike Pope retired
- (Argentina) Nicolas Coronel to (Italy) Lazio
- (England) Bar Bartlett retired
- (England) Alex Cheesman retired

== Coventry ==
=== Players In ===
- (England) Charlie Beech from (England) Yorkshire Carnegie
- (England) James Gibbons from (England) Ealing Trailfinders
- (Scotland) Andrew Bulumakau from (England) Doncaster Knights
- (Scotland) Junior Bulumakau from (England) Doncaster Knights
- (Tonga) Jack Ram from (England) Doncaster Knights
- (England) Jake Sharp from (England) London Scottish
- (England) Adam Peters from (England) Rotherham Titans
- (Tonga) David Halaifonua from (England) Gloucester
- (England) Ben Nutley from (England) Northampton Saints
- (England) Darren Dawidiuk from (England) London Irish
- (England) Tim Bitirim from (England) Loughborough Students RUFC
- (England) Tom Kessell from (England) Northampton Saints
- (Australia) Ben Adams from (England) Bedford Blues
- (Tonga) Daniel Faleafa from (France) Colomiers
- (Canada) Rob Povey from (England) Bedford Athletic
- (England) Dan Lewis from (England) Bedford Blues
- (England) Alex Woolford from (England) Northampton Saints
- (England) Biyi Alo from (England) Worcester Warriors

=== Players Out ===
- (England) Jimmy Litchfield to (England) London Scottish
- (England) Luke Narraway retired
- (Fiji) Ravai Fatiaki to (England) Birmingham Moseley

== Doncaster Knights ==
=== Players In ===
- (England) Toby Williams from (England) Rotherham Titans
- (England) Tom Calladine from (England) Rotherham Titans
- (Scotland) Robin Hislop from (Scotland) Ayr
- (Scotland) Steve McColl from (England) Yorkshire Carnegie
- (Ireland) Willie Ryan from (England) Ealing Trailfinders
- (England) Elliott Creed from (England) Gloucester
- (United States) Nick Civetta from (England) Newcastle Falcons
- (Fiji) Henry Seniloli from (Romania) Timișoara Saracens
- (England) Cameron Cowell from (England) Newcastle Falcons (season-long loan)
- (Tonga) Kurt Morath from (United States) Utah Warriors
- (Georgia (country)) Lasha Lomidze from (France) Aurillac

=== Players Out ===
- (Canada) Aaron Carpenter retired
- (Ireland) Michael Heaney to (England) Worcester Warriors
- (Namibia) Lesley Klim to (Wales) Ospreys
- (Scotland) Andrew Bulumakau to (England) Coventry
- (Scotland) Junior Bulumakau to (England) Coventry
- (Tonga) Jack Ram to (England) Coventry
- (New Zealand) Adam Batt to (England) Jersey Reds
- (England) Jack Bergmanas to (England) Rotherham Titans

== Ealing Trailfinders ==
=== Players In ===
- (England) Ollie Stedman from (England) Yorkshire Carnegie
- (England) Sam Dickinson from (England) Northampton Saints
- (Ireland) Jack O'Connell from (England) Bristol Bears
- (England) Jordan Onojaife from (England) Northampton Saints
- (England) Laurence May from (England) Cornish Pirates
- (Ireland) Ben Betts from (England) Leicester Tigers
- (England) Sam Olver from (England) Worcester Warriors
- (England) Tom Denton from (England) Gloucester
- (England) George Edgson from (England) Bedford Blues
- (England) Howard Packman from (England) Bedford Blues
- (England) Guy Armitage from (England) Wasps
- (England) Harry Sloan from (England) Harlequins
- (England) Ben West from (England) Yorkshire Carnegie
- (England) Matt Beesley from (England) Northampton Saints
- (Ireland) Ryan Foley from (France) Grasse
- (Ireland) David Johnston from (Ireland) Munster
- (England) Jordan Burns from (England) Bedford Blues
- (Scotland) Elliot Millar-Mills from (Scotland) Edinburgh
- (United States) Andrew Durutalo from (England) Worcester Warriors
- (England) Craig Willis from (England) Newcastle Falcons
- (Wales) Ben Williams from (Wales) Cardiff Metropolitan University
- (Wales) George Simpson from (Wales) Cardiff Metropolitan University
- (United States) Ben Landry from (United States) Glendale Raptors
- (Australia) Jordy Reid from (Australia) Melbourne Rebels
- (South Africa) Pat Howard from (Wales) Dragons
- (England) Jake Ellwood from (England) Darlington Mowden Park
- (England) George Davis from (England) Loughborough Students RUFC
- (Argentina) Segundo Tuculet from (France) Narbonne
- (England) Alex Lundberg from (England) Wasps
- (England) Max Davies from (England) Newcastle Falcons
- (Australia) Rohan O'Regan from (Australia) Sydney University
- (South Africa) Jordan Els from (South Africa) Sharks

=== Players Out ===
- (England) Will Davis to (England) Northampton Saints
- (England) Lewis Thiede to (England) Bristol Bears
- (England) Piers O'Conor to (England) Bristol Bears
- (England) Luke Daniels to (England) Bristol Bears
- (England) Sam Rodman to (England) Jersey Reds
- (England) Aaron Penberthy to (England) Jersey Reds
- (Canada) Shane O'Leary to (England) Nottingham
- (England) James Gibbons to (England) Coventry
- (England) Ollie Curry to (England) Bedford Blues
- (England) Mark Bright to (England) London Scottish
- (Wales) Llewelyn Jones to (England) Nottingham
- (Wales) Rhys Lawrence to (Wales) Dragons
- (England) Barney Maddison to (England) London Irish
- (Wales) Lewis Robling to (England) Bedford Blues
- (Ireland) Willie Ryan to (England) Doncaster Knights
- (Wales) Morgan Allen to (Wales) Cardiff
- (England) Miles Mantella to (England) London Scottish
- (New Zealand) Daniel Temm to (England) Yorkshire Carnegie
- (Canada) Djustice Sears-Duru to (Canada) Ontario Blues
- (England) Arthur Ellis to (England) Rosslyn Park
- (England) Glen Townson retired
- (England) Joe Munro to (England) Rosslyn Park
- (England) Rory Clegg released
- (England) James Hallam released

== Hartpury College ==
=== Players In ===
- (England) Luke Cozens from (France) Rouen
- (England) Richard Bolt from (France) Rouen
- (England) Jake Henry from (England) Rotherham Titans
- (England) Ben Foley from (England) Rotherham Titans
- (England) Simon Linsell from (England) University of Exeter
- (Wales) Jordan Liney from (England) Bristol Bears
- (England) Will Hopwood from (England) Fylde
- (New Zealand) Ollie Walker from (England) Shelford
- (England) Ban Kelland from (England) Bedford Blues
- (Fiji) Akapusi Qera from (France) Agen

=== Players Out ===
- (England) James Williams to (England) Birmingham Moseley
- (England) Mike Daniels to (England) Nottingham
- (England) Ed Coulson to (England) Bedford Blues
- (England) Maliq Holden to (England) Cornish Pirates
- (England) George Boulton to (England) Cinderford
- (England) Jacob Perry to (England) London Scottish
- (England) Alex Ducker to (England) Camborne
- (Australia) BJ Edwards to (Australia) Gungahlin Eagles
- (England) Tom Heard to (England) Cinderford
- (Samoa) Ben So'oalo Chan to (England) Cinderford
- (England) Joe Dancer to (England) Chinnor
- (England) Darrell Dyer to (France) Carcasonne

== Jersey Reds ==
=== Players In ===
- (England) Aaron Penberthy from (England) Ealing Trailfinders
- (England) Sam Rodman from (England) Ealing Trailfinders
- (England) Brett Herron from (Ireland) Ulster
- (Namibia) Janco Venter from (South Africa) Stellenbosch University
- (South Africa) Graham Geldenhuys from (South Africa) Sharks
- (Zimbabwe) Hilton Mudariki from (South Africa) University of Johannesburg
- (New Zealand) Leroy Van Dam from (Hong Kong) Valley RFC
- (England) Harry Morley from (England) Cambridge
- (South Africa) Kyle Hatherell from (Scotland) Marr
- (South Africa) Koch Marx from (South Africa) Golden Lions
- (England) Jack Stapley from (England) Loughborough Students RUFC
- (Ireland) James Newey from (England) Bristol Bears
- (England) Will Homer from (England) Bath
- (England) Charlie Beckett from (England) Gloucester
- (England) Charlie Maddison from (England) Rotherham Titans
- (South Africa) Cameron Holenstein from (England) Harlequins
- (New Zealand) Adam Batt from (England) Doncaster Knights

=== Players Out ===
- (South Africa) Scott van Breda to (England) Worcester Warriors
- (England) Jake Armstrong to (England) Bristol Bears
- (England) Jake Woolmore to (England) Bristol Bears
- (Australia) Tom Pincus to (England) Bristol Bears
- (England) James Voss to (England) Leicester Tigers
- (South Africa) Brendan Cope to (England) Yorkshire Carnegie
- (Wales) Kieran Hardy to (Wales) Scarlets
- (England) Matt Rogerson to (England) London Irish
- (South Africa) Jared Saunders to (England) London Scottish
- (Tonga) Uili Koloʻofai to (Italy) Paspa Pesaro
- (England) Jordan Brodley to (England) London Scottish
- (Australia) Ellis Abrahams to (England) Rotherham Titans
- (England) Seb Nagle-Taylor to (England) Rotherham Titans
- (New Zealand) Tom Quarrie to (France) Marmande
- (England) Oliver Bryant to (Spain) CR El Salvador

== London Irish ==
=== Players In ===
- (England) Stephen Myler from (England) Northampton Saints
- (England) Tom Stephenson from (England) Northampton Saints
- (England) Barney Maddison from (England) Ealing Trailfinders
- (England) Matt Rogerson from (England) Jersey Reds
- (United States) Bryce Campbell from (United States) Glendale Raptors
- (Samoa) Motu Matu'u from (England) Gloucester
- (South Africa) Pat Cilliers from (England) Leicester Tigers
- (England) Sam Twomey from (England) Harlequins
- (Samoa) TJ Ioane from (England) Sale Sharks
- (Ireland) Brendan Macken from (England) Wasps
- (Fiji) Albert Tuisue from (Fiji) Fijian Drua
- (Fiji) Alivereti Veitokani from (Fiji) Fijian Drua

=== Players Out ===
- (England) Alex Lewington to (England) Saracens
- (New Zealand) Ben Franks to (England) Northampton Saints
- (England) David Paice retired
- (England) Tom Woolstencroft to (England) Saracens
- (England) Joe Cokanasiga to (England) Bath
- (England) Darren Dawidiuk to (England) Coventry
- (South Africa) Piet van Zyl to (France) Stade Français Paris
- (England) Johnny Williams to (England) Newcastle Falcons
- (South Africa) Arno Botha to (Ireland) Munster
- (South Africa) Richard Palframan to (England) London Scottish
- (Fiji) Senitiki Nayalo to (Scotland) Edinburgh
- (England) Todd Gleave to (England) Gloucester
- (New Zealand) James Marshall to (New Zealand) Hurricanes
- (England) Tom Smallbone to (England) London Scottish
- (Georgia (country)) Lasha Lomidze to (France) Aurillac
- (England) Josh Basham to (England) Durham University
- (South Africa) Petrus du Plessis to (Scotland) Glasgow Warriors
- (New Zealand) Will Lloyd released
- (Fiji) Asaeli Tikoirotuma released

== London Scottish ==
=== Players In ===
- (England) Mark Bright from (England) Ealing Trailfinders
- (England) Rory Jennings from (England) Bath
- (England) Jimmy Litchfield from (England) Coventry
- (England) Luke Frost from (England) Loughborough Students RUFC
- (England) Ollie Adams from (England) Loughborough Students RUFC
- (Scotland) Grayson Hart from (England) Worcester Warriors
- (South Africa) Jared Saunders from (England) Jersey Reds
- (Scotland) Richie Vernon from (Scotland) Glasgow Warriors
- (South Africa) Richard Palframan from (England) London Irish
- (England) Theo Vukasinovic from (England) Loughborough Students RUFC
- (England) Jacob Perry from (England) Hartpury College
- (England) Billy Harding from (England) Esher
- (Australia) Byron Hodge from (England) Rotherham Titans
- (England) Jordan Brodley from (England) Jersey Reds
- (Scotland) Lewis Wynne from (Scotland) Glasgow Warriors (season-long loan)
- (England) Miles Mantella from (England) Ealing Trailfinders
- (England) Tom Smallbone from (England) London Irish
- (England) Craig Duncan from (England) University of Bath
- (Papua New Guinea) Henari Veratau from (France) Bourgoin

=== Players Out ===
- (Scotland) Isaac Miller to (England) Worcester Warriors
- (England) Jake Sharp to (England) Coventry
- (Scotland) Ewan McQuillin to (England) Yorkshire Carnegie
- (England) Joe Atkinson to (England) Wasps
- (England) Ross Neal to (England) Wasps
- (Italy) Derrick Appiah to (Italy) Benetton
- (England) Dom McGeekie to (England) Old Elthamians
- (England) Basil Strang to (England) Esher
- (England) Max Berry to (England) Esher
- (England) Ed Milne to (England) Richmond
- (England) Nick Scott from (England) Richmond
- (England) Craig Holland to (England) Chinnor

== Nottingham ==
=== Players In ===
- (England) Luke Cole from (England) Rotherham Titans
- (Canada) Shane O'Leary from (England) Ealing Trailfinders
- (Wales) Llewelyn Jones from (England) Ealing Trailfinders
- (England) Will Owen from (England) Wasps
- (England) Mike Daniels from (England) Hartpury College
- (Ireland) Oisin Heffernan from (Ireland) Leinster
- (England) Luke Peters from (England) Rotherham Titans
- (United States) Cam Dolan from (United States) San Diego Legion

=== Players Out ===
- (England) Tiff Eden to (England) Bristol Bears
- (England) Matt Everard retired
- (England) Josh Skelcey to (England) Plymouth Albion
- (England) Ben Morris to (England) Wasps
- (England) Jimmy Stevens to (England) Leicester Tigers
- (England) Oliver Evans to (England) Richmond
- (Tonga) Viliami Hakalo to (England) Saracens

== Richmond ==
=== Players In ===
- (England) Jack Wallace from (England) Bristol Bears
- (Wales) Lewis Dennett from (Wales) Ebbw Vale
- (England) Sam Edgerley from (England) Oxford University
- (England) Oliver Evans from (England) Nottingham
- (England) Rupert Freestone from (England) Plymouth Albion
- (England) Ed Milne from (England) London Scottish
- (England) Nick Scott from (England) London Scottish
- (England) Dave Spelman from (England) Bedford Blues

== Yorkshire Carnegie ==
=== Players In ===
- (South Africa) Brendan Cope from (England) Jersey Reds
- (Wales) Jean-Baptiste Bruzulier from (France) Nevers
- (Canada) Jake Ilnicki from (England) Newcastle Falcons
- (Scotland) Ewan McQuillin from (England) London Scottish
- (Wales) Rowan Jenkins from (Wales) Ospreys
- (England) Andrew Foster from (England) Rotherham Titans
- (New Zealand) Daniel Temm from (England) Ealing Trailfinders
- (England) Kieran Frost from (England) Wharfedale
- (Canada) Dan Moor from (England) Oxford University
- (New Zealand) Antonio Kiri Kiri from (New Zealand) Manawatu
- (New Zealand) Jade Te Rure from (New Zealand) Manawatu
- (Ireland) Cian Romaine from (New Zealand) North Harbour
- (New Zealand) Nic Mayhew from (Australia) Brumbies
- (Samoa) Fa'atiga Lemalu from (New Zealand) Auckland
- (New Zealand) Elijah Niko from (France) Beziers

=== Players Out ===
- (Scotland) Michael Cusack retired
- (England) Ollie Stedman to (England) Ealing Trailfinders
- (England) Charlie Beech to (England) Coventry
- (England) Ben West to (England) Ealing Trailfinders
- (Scotland) Steve McColl to (England) Doncaster Knights
- (England) Alex Davies to (England) Bath

== See also ==
- List of 2018–19 Premiership Rugby transfers
- List of 2018–19 Pro14 transfers
- List of 2018–19 Super Rugby transfers
- List of 2018–19 Top 14 transfers
- List of 2018–19 Major League Rugby transfers
