= List of 2018–19 Premiership Rugby transfers =

This is a list of player transfers involving Premiership Rugby teams before or during the 2018–19 season. The list is of deals that are confirmed and are either from or to a rugby union team in the Premiership during the 2017–18 season. Bristol Bears won promotion to the Premiership from the 2018–19 season, whilst London Irish were relegated to the RFU Championship from the 2018–19 season.

== Bath ==
=== Players In ===
- (New Zealand) Jackson Willison from (England) Worcester Warriors
- (Argentina) Lucas Noguera Paz from (Argentina) Jaguares
- (France) Victor Delmas from (France) Colomiers
- (England) Darren Atkins promoted from Academy
- Ruaridh McConnochie from England Sevens
- (Wales) Jamie Roberts from (England) Harlequins
- (England) Will Chudley from (England) Exeter Chiefs
- (England) Joe Cokanasiga from (England) London Irish
- (England) Alex Davies from (England) Yorkshire Carnegie
- (South Africa) Jacques van Rooyen from (South Africa) Lions

=== Players Out ===
- (England) Matt Banahan to (England) Gloucester
- (Wales) Josh Lewis to (Wales) Dragons
- (Australia) Ben Tapuai to (England) Harlequins
- (England) Nick Auterac to (England) Harlequins
- (England) James Phillips to (England) Sale Sharks
- (Australia) Nathan Charles to (Australia) Melbourne Rebels
- (England) Rory Jennings to (England) London Scottish
- (England) Will Homer to (England) Jersey Reds
- (England) Kane Palma-Newport to (France) Colomiers
- (England) Shaun Knight to (France) Rouen
- (New Zealand) James Wilson to (New Zealand) Southland
- (Wales) Harry Davies to (England) Bedford Blues
- (England) Jeff Williams to (France) Rodez Aveyron
- (Wales) Darren Allinson released

== Bristol Bears ==
=== Players In ===
- (New Zealand) Charles Piutau from (Ireland) Ulster
- (New Zealand) John Afoa from (England) Gloucester
- (South Africa) Shaun Malton from (England) Exeter Chiefs
- (Australia) Nic Stirzaker from (Australia) Melbourne Rebels
- (England) Yann Thomas from (France) Rouen
- (England) Aly Muldowney from (France) Grenoble
- (England) Tiff Eden from (England) Nottingham
- (England) Harry Thacker from (England) Leicester Tigers
- (New Zealand) Jake Heenan from (Ireland) Connacht
- (Samoa) Jordan Lay from (Scotland) Edinburgh
- (England) Ollie Dawe promoted from Academy
- (England) Tom Lindsay from (England) Bedford Blues
- (England) Jake Armstrong from (England) Jersey Reds
- (England) Jake Woolmore from (England) Jersey Reds
- (Australia) Tom Pincus from (England) Jersey Reds
- (England) Lewis Thiede from (England) Ealing Trailfinders
- (England) Piers O'Conor from (England) Ealing Trailfinders
- (England) Luke Daniels from (England) Ealing Trailfinders
- (England) Harry Randall from (England) Gloucester
- (England) Ed Holmes from (England) Exeter Chiefs
- (Samoa) James Lay from (New Zealand) Bay of Plenty
- (Australia) George Smith from (Australia) Queensland Reds

=== Players Out ===
- (Wales) Jordan Williams to (Wales) Dragons
- (Wales) Rhodri Williams to (Wales) Dragons
- (England) Olly Robinson to (Wales) Cardiff Blues
- (England) Max Crumpton to (England) Harlequins
- (Wales) Ryan Bevington to (Wales) Dragons
- (Samoa) David Lemi to (France) Chanlon
- (Ireland) Jack O'Connell to (England) Ealing Trailfinders
- (England) Tyler Gendall to (England) Cornish Pirates
- (Ireland) James Newey to (England) Jersey Reds
- (England) Billy Searle to (England) Wasps
- (Tonga) Soane Tongaʻuiha to (England) Ampthill
- (Georgia (country)) Giorgi Nemsadze to (Wales) Ospreys
- (Argentina) Gaston Cortes to (England) Leicester Tigers
- (England) Jack Wallace to (England) Richmond
- (Ireland) Dan Tuohy to (France) Vannes
- (Wales) Jordan Liney to (England) Hartpury College
- (England) Ross McMillan to (England) Leicester Tigers
- (England) Alex Giltrow to (England) Clifton
- (Ireland) Jason Harris-Wright released
- (United States) Thretton Palamo released
- (England) Ryan Glynn released
- (England) Ben Gompels released

== Exeter Chiefs ==
=== Players In ===
- (Wales) Alex Cuthbert from (Wales) Cardiff Blues
- (Argentina) Santiago Cordero from (Argentina) Jaguares

=== Players Out ===
- (England) Kai Horstmann retired
- (South Africa) Shaun Malton to (England) Bristol Bears
- (England) Thomas Waldrom to (New Zealand) Wellington Lions
- (England) Will Chudley to (England) Bath
- (England) Ed Holmes to (England) Bristol Bears
- (Australia) Julian Salvi retired
- (England) Carl Rimmer retired
- (Italy) Michele Campagnaro to (England) Wasps

== Gloucester ==
=== Players In ===
- (England) Matt Banahan from (England) Bath
- (South Africa) Franco Marais from (South Africa) Sharks
- (South Africa) Jaco Kriel from (South Africa) Lions
- (England) Danny Cipriani from (England) Wasps
- (England) Tom Hudson promoted from Academy
- (South Africa) Gerbrandt Grobler from (Ireland) Munster
- (England) Will Safe promoted from Academy
- (South Africa) Franco Mostert from (South Africa) Lions
- (South Africa) Ruan Dreyer from (South Africa) Lions
- (England) Todd Gleave from (England) London Irish
- (Scotland) Kyle Traynor from (England) Leicester Tigers
- (Ireland) Mike Sherry from (Ireland) Munster (loan)

=== Players Out ===
- (Wales) Ross Moriarty to (Wales) Dragons
- (Wales) Richard Hibbard to (Wales) Dragons
- (New Zealand) John Afoa to (England) Bristol Bears
- (Scotland) Matt Scott to (Scotland) Edinburgh
- (Australia) Cameron Orr to (Australia) Western Force
- (England) Andy Symons to (England) Northampton Saints
- (England) Tom Denton to (England) Ealing Trailfinders
- (England) Harry Randall to (England) Bristol Bears
- (Tonga) David Halaifonua to (England) Coventry
- (England) Charlie Beckett to (England) Jersey Reds
- (New Zealand) Jeremy Thrush to (Australia) Western Force
- (England) Ed Bogue to (England) Cinderford
- (Samoa) Motu Matu'u to (England) London Irish
- (England) Elliott Creed to (England) Doncaster Knights
- (England) Billy Burns to (Ireland) Ulster
- (England) Alfie North to (Scotland) Ayr
- (England) Jacob Rowan retired
- (Wales) Carwyn Penny to (Wales) Dragons
- (Argentina) Mariano Galarza to (France) Bordeaux
- (England) Mason Tonks to (England) Worcester Warriors

== Harlequins ==
=== Players In ===
- (England) Marcus Smith promoted from Academy
- (England) Nathan Earle from (England) Saracens
- (England) Max Crumpton from (England) Bristol Bears
- (England) Alex Dombrandt from (Wales) Cardiff Metropolitan University
- (Australia) Ben Tapuai from (England) Bath
- (England) Nick Auterac from (England) Bath
- (England) Matt Symons from (England) Wasps
- (United States) Paul Lasike from (United States) Utah Warriors
- (Fiji) Semi Kunatani from (France) Toulouse

=== Players Out ===
- (Wales) Jamie Roberts to (England) Bath
- (Samoa) Winston Stanley retired
- (Wales) Adam Jones retired
- (England) Harry Sloan to (England) Ealing Trailfinders
- (England) Sam Aspland-Robinson to (England) Leicester Tigers
- (England) Charlie Matthews to (England) Wasps
- (Australia) Ian Prior to (Australia) Western Force
- (South Africa) Cameron Holenstein to (England) Jersey Reds
- (England) Sam Twomey to (England) London Irish
- (New Zealand) Jono Kitto to (New Zealand) Northland
- (England) Joe Gray to (England) Northampton Saints (short-term deal)
- (South Africa) Tim Swiel to (England) Newcastle Falcons

== Leicester Tigers ==
=== Players In ===
- (England) Guy Thompson from (England) Wasps
- (England) Will Spencer from (England) Worcester Warriors
- (Scotland) David Denton from (England) Worcester Warriors
- (England) James Voss from (England) Jersey Reds
- (England) Sam Aspland-Robinson from (England) Harlequins
- (England) Jimmy Stevens from (England) Nottingham
- (Argentina) Gaston Cortes from (England) Bristol Bears
- (England) Owen Hills promoted from Academy
- (England) Charlie Thacker promoted from Academy
- (England) Fred Tuilagi promoted from Academy
- (England) George Worth promoted from Academy
- (England) Kyle Eastmond from (England) Wasps
- (Fiji) Campese Ma'afu from (England) Northampton Saints
- (Tonga) David Feao from (France) Narbonne
- (England) Ross McMillan from (England) Bristol Bears
- (Argentina) Felipe Ezcurra from (Argentina) Jaguares (short-term deal)
- (England) Tom Varndell from (France) Angoulême
- (Italy) Leonardo Sarto from (Scotland) Glasgow Warriors

=== Players Out ===
- (England) Harry Thacker to (England) Bristol Bears
- (England) Dominic Barrow to (England) Northampton Saints
- (Ireland) Ben Betts to (England) Ealing Trailfinders
- (Samoa) Logovi'i Mulipola to (England) Newcastle Falcons
- (England) George McGuigan to (England) Newcastle Falcons
- (England) Joe Maksymiw to (Ireland) Connacht
- Nick Malouf to Australia Sevens
- (England) George Catchpole retired
- (Italy) Michele Rizzo to (Italy) Petrarca
- (Scotland) Luke Hamilton to (Scotland) Edinburgh
- (South Africa) Pat Cilliers to (England) London Irish
- (Ireland) Dominic Ryan retired
- (Tonga) Afa Pakalani to (Australia) NSW Country Eagles
- (England) Tom Brady to (France) Carcassonne
- (Scotland) Kyle Traynor to (England) Gloucester
- (United States) Chris Baumann released

== Newcastle Falcons ==
=== Players In ===
- (Scotland) Guy Graham from (Scotland) Hawick
- (England) Tom Arscott from (France) Rouen
- (Samoa) Logovi'i Mulipola from (England) Leicester Tigers
- (England) George McGuigan from (England) Leicester Tigers
- (England) Johnny Williams from (England) London Irish
- (England) Connor Collett from (New Zealand) North Harbour
- (Fiji) Nemani Nagusa from (France) Aurillac
- (Portugal) Pedro Bettencourt from (France) Carcassonne
- (United States) Paul Mullen from (United States) Houston SaberCats (short-term deal)
- (England) Tim Swiel from (England) Harlequins
- (Scotland) John Hardie from (Scotland) Edinburgh
- (Ireland) Rodney Ah You from (Ireland) Ulster

=== Players Out ===
- (Argentina) Juan Pablo Socino to (Scotland) Edinburgh
- (Australia) Harrison Orr to (Australia) Western Force
- (Canada) D. T. H. van der Merwe to (Scotland) Glasgow Warriors
- (Argentina) Belisario Agulla to (Argentina) Hindu Club
- (England) Craig Willis to (England) Ealing Trailfinders
- (Canada) Jake Ilnicki to (England) Yorkshire Carnegie
- (England) Rob Vickers retired
- (Scotland) Ally Hogg retired
- (Scotland) Scott Lawson retired
- (United States) Nick Civetta to (England) Doncaster Knights
- (France) Maxime Mermoz to (France) Toulouse
- (Tonga) Nili Latu to (Japan) Hino Red Dolphins
- (Canada) Evan Olmstead to (New Zealand) Auckland
- (England) Ben Sowrey to (England) Wharfedale
- (England) Cameron Cowell to (England) Doncaster Knights (season-long loan)
- (England) Max Davies to (England) Ealing Trailfinders
- (Scotland) Andrew Davidson to (Scotland) Glasgow Warriors (short-term deal)
- (England) Scott Wilson retired

== Northampton Saints ==
=== Players In ===
- (Wales) Dan Biggar from (Wales) Ospreys
- (Australia) Taqele Naiyaravoro from (Australia) NSW Waratahs
- (England) Will Davis from (England) Ealing Trailfinders
- (New Zealand) Ben Franks from (England) London Irish
- (England) Dominic Barrow from (England) Leicester Tigers
- (England) Andy Symons from (England) Gloucester
- (England) James Haskell from (England) Wasps
- (Hong Kong) Matt Worley from (France) Racing 92
- (England) Charlie Davies from (Wales) Dragons
- (Australia) Andrew Kellaway from (Australia) NSW Waratahs
- (England) Joe Gray from (England) Harlequins (short-term deal)

=== Players Out ===
- (England) Sam Dickinson to (England) Ealing Trailfinders
- (England) Jordan Onojaife to (England) Ealing Trailfinders
- (South Africa) Nic Groom to (South Africa) Lions
- (England) Charlie Clare to (England) Bedford Blues
- (England) Matt Beesley to (England) Ealing Trailfinders
- (England) Christian Day retired
- (Australia) Rob Horne retired
- (Wales) George North to (Wales) Ospreys
- (England) Ben Nutley to (England) Coventry
- (England) Stephen Myler to (England) London Irish
- (England) Tom Stephenson to (England) London Irish
- (England) Kieran Brookes to (England) Wasps
- (England) Tom Kessell to (England) Coventry
- (Argentina) Juan Pablo Estelles to (Argentina) Atlético del Rosario
- (England) Ben Foden to (United States) Rugby United New York
- (England) Jamie Elliott to (England) Bedford Blues
- (Fiji) Campese Ma'afu to (England) Leicester Tigers
- (England) Alex Woolford to (England) Coventry
- (Spain) Josh Peters to (England) Blackheath
- (England) Michael Paterson released

== Sale Sharks ==
=== Players In ===
- (Wales) Joe Jones from (France) Perpignan
- (England) James Phillips from (England) Bath
- (South Africa) Rohan Janse van Rensburg from (South Africa) Lions
- (England) Chris Ashton from (France) Toulon
- (England) Tom Bristow from (France) Narbonne
- (South Africa) Robert du Preez from (South Africa) Sharks (short-term deal)
- (Russia) Valery Morozov from (Russia) Enisei-STM

=== Players Out ===
- (England) Mike Haley to (Ireland) Munster
- (England) Josh Charnley to (England) Warrington Wolves
- (England) Will Addison to (Ireland) Ulster
- (England) David Seymour to (England) Sale FC
- (Tonga) Halani Aulika to (France) Grenoble
- (Samoa) TJ Ioane to (England) London Irish
- (Wales) Marc Jones to (Wales) Scarlets

== Saracens ==
=== Players In ===
- (England) Alex Lewington from (England) London Irish
- (England) David Strettle from (France) Clermont
- (England) Tom Woolstencroft from (England) London Irish
- (Tonga) Viliami Hakalo from (England) Nottingham
- (England) Christian Judge from (England) Cornish Pirates (short-term loan)
- (England) Joe Gray from (England) Northampton Saints
- (Samoa) Hisa Sasagi from (New Zealand) Otago (short-term deal)
- (South Africa) Chris van Zyl from (South Africa) Stormers (short-term deal)

=== Players Out ===
- (South Africa) Schalk Brits retired
- (England) Nathan Earle to (England) Harlequins
- (United States) Chris Wyles retired
- (Australia) Kieran Longbottom to (Australia) Western Force
- (England) Danny Cutmore to (England) Cornish Pirates
- (Ireland) Mark Flanagan to (England) Bedford Blues
- (England) Matt Hankin retired
- Mike Ellery to England Sevens
- (England) Joel Conlon retired

== Wasps ==
=== Players In ===
- (England) Brad Shields from (New Zealand) Hurricanes
- (New Zealand) Lima Sopoaga from (New Zealand) Highlanders
- (England) Joe Atkinson from (England) London Scottish
- (England) Ross Neal from (England) London Scottish
- (England) Michael Le Bourgeois from (England) Bedford Blues
- (England) Ben Morris from (England) Nottingham
- (England) Billy Searle from (England) Bristol Bears
- (New Zealand) Ambrose Curtis from (New Zealand) Manawatu
- (England) Charlie Matthews from (England) Harlequins
- (England) Tom West promoted from Academy
- (England) Will Stuart promoted from Academy
- (South Africa) Nizaam Carr from (South Africa) Stormers
- (England) Kieran Brookes from (England) Northampton Saints
- (Georgia (country)) Zurab Zhvania from (France) Stade Français Paris
- (Italy) Michele Campagnaro from (England) Exeter Chiefs

=== Players Out ===
- (Ireland) Marty Moore to (Ireland) Ulster
- (England) Guy Thompson to (England) Leicester Tigers
- (England) Sam Jones retired
- (England) Guy Armitage to (England) Ealing Trailfinders
- (England) Will Owen to (England) Nottingham
- (England) Danny Cipriani to (England) Gloucester
- (England) James Haskell to (England) Northampton Saints
- (England) Matt Symons to (England) Harlequins
- (England) Alex Lundberg to (England) Ealing Trailfinders
- (England) Kyle Eastmond to (England) Leicester Tigers
- (England) Paul Doran-Jones to (England) Rosslyn Park
- (Ireland) Brendan Macken to (England) London Irish
- (England) Christian Wade retired

== Worcester Warriors ==
=== Players In ===
- (Ireland) Callum Black from (Ireland) Ulster
- (Wales) Ashley Beck from (Wales) Ospreys
- (Scotland) Cornell du Preez from (Scotland) Edinburgh
- (Ireland) Michael Heaney from (England) Doncaster Knights
- (Scotland) Isaac Miller from (England) London Scottish
- (South Africa) Scott van Breda from (England) Jersey Reds
- (Australia) Jono Lance from (Australia) Queensland Reds
- (South Africa) Francois Venter from (South Africa) Cheetahs
- (New Zealand) Michael Fatialofa from (New Zealand) Hurricanes
- (Scotland) Duncan Weir from (Scotland) Edinburgh
- (Zimbabwe) Farai Mudariki from (France) Tarbes
- (England) Justin Clegg promoted from Academy
- (England) Zac Xiourouppa promoted from Academy
- (England) Mason Tonks from (England) Gloucester

=== Players Out ===
- (Ireland) Donncha O'Callaghan retired
- (England) Huw Taylor to (Wales) Dragons
- (New Zealand) Jackson Willison to (England) Bath
- (England) Will Spencer to (England) Leicester Tigers
- (Scotland) David Denton to (England) Leicester Tigers
- (England) Sam Olver to (England) Ealing Trailfinders
- (United States) Andrew Durutalo to (England) Ealing Trailfinders
- (Australia) Michael Dowsett to (Japan) Canon Eagles
- Ben Howard to England Sevens
- (South Africa) Kurt Haupt to (South Africa) SWD Eagles
- (Scotland) Grayson Hart to (England) London Scottish
- (England) Max Stelling to (Japan) Hino Red Dolphins
- (Ireland) Peter Stringer retired
- (England) Biyi Alo to (England) Coventry
- (Scotland) Tom Heathcote released

== See also ==
- List of 2018–19 Pro14 transfers
- List of 2018–19 RFU Championship transfers
- List of 2018–19 Super Rugby transfers
- List of 2018–19 Top 14 transfers
- List of 2018-19 Major League Rugby transfers
