= Palframan =

Palframan is a surname. Notable people with the surname include:

- Justine Palframan (born 1993), South African sprinter
- Richard Palframan (born 1993), South African rugby union player
- Steve Palframan (born 1970), South African cricketer
