= 2019–20 RFU Championship =

Rugby union competition in England

2019–20 Greene King IPA Championship
- Countries: England; Jersey
- Date: 11 October 2019 - 14 March 2020
- Champions: Newcastle Falcons (3rd title)
- Runners-up: Ealing Trailfinders
- Relegated: Yorkshire Carnegie
- Matches played: 87
- Attendance: 139,760 (average 1,606 per match)
- Highest attendance: 6,315; Newcastle Falcons v Cornish Pirates; 16 February 2020
- Lowest attendance: 300; Yorkshire Carnegie v Ampthill; 22 February 2020
- Tries scored: 523 (average 6 per match)
- Top point scorer: (England) Louis Grimoldby (Ampthill) (England) Rory Jennings (Coventry) (England) Sam Olver (Doncaster Knights); 112 points each
- Top try scorer: (England) George McGuigan (Newcastle Falcons) (England) Adam Radwan (Newcastle Falcons); 10 tries each

The 2019–20 RFU Championship, known as the 2019–20 Greene King IPA Championship for sponsorship reasons, was the eleventh season of the RFU Championship, the professional second tier of rugby union in England. It featured eleven English teams and one from Jersey. The competition was sponsored by Greene King for the seventh successive season.

Due to the COVID-19 pandemic in the United Kingdom, the Rugby Football Union officially cancelled the season on 20 March 2020, after initially postponing all rugby in England including training from 17 March until 14 April 2020. As a result, Newcastle Falcons were declared champions for the season, and promoted to the Premiership on 2 April 2020 on the basis of a best playing record formula, having been undefeated and top of the table when the league was suspended, while Yorkshire Carnegie were relegated to National League 1 at the bottom.

== Structure ==
The team that finished first was promoted to Premiership Rugby as their ground met the RFU Minimum Standards Criteria. The team that finished last was relegated to National League 1. Each club received £530,000 in funding from the RFU in the last year of a deal with the RFU.

Plans to expand Premiership Rugby from 12 to 13 teams for the 2019–20 season, which would have reprieved Newcastle Falcons from being relegated to the Championship, were blocked by the RFU. Plans to abolish promotion and relegation were under discussion prior to the season, and drew complaints and threats of legal action from the Cornish Pirates. There were also plans for the RFU Championship to have a delayed start until October due to the 2019 Rugby World Cup.

The season began on 20 September 2019 with the Championship Rugby Cup after which the first round of matches started on 11 October 2019 and the final round of matches were scheduled to be played on 9 May 2020.

== Teams ==
Locations of the 2019–20 RFU Championship teams

Richmond were relegated to National League 1 after finishing bottom of the 2018-19 RFU Championship. They are replaced by Ampthill who were promoted from 2018-19 National League 1 in their fifth promotion in twelve years, playing in the Championship for the first time. London Irish were promoted back to Premiership Rugby at the first attempt. They are replaced in the RFU Championship by Newcastle Falcons who were relegated after finishing last in 2018-19 Premiership Rugby.

Club	Stadium	Capacity	Area	Previous season
Ampthill	Dillingham Park	3,000	Ampthill, Bedfordshire	Promoted from National League 1 (champions)
Bedford Blues	Goldington Road	5,000 (1,700 seats)	Bedford, Bedfordshire	3rd
Cornish Pirates	Mennaye Field	4,000 (2,200 Seats)	Penzance, Cornwall	5th
Coventry	Butts Park Arena	4,000 (3,000 seats)	Coventry, West Midlands	8th
Doncaster Knights	Castle Park	5,000 (1,650 seats)	Doncaster, South Yorkshire	10th
Ealing Trailfinders	Trailfinders Sports Ground	4,000 (2,200 Seats)	West Ealing, London	Runners up
Hartpury College	ALPAS Arena	2,000	Hartpury, Gloucestershire	11th
Jersey Reds	Stade Santander International	4,000	Saint Peter, Jersey	4th
London Scottish	Athletic Ground, Richmond	4,500 (1,000 seats)	Richmond, London	9th
Newcastle Falcons	Kingston Park	10,200	Newcastle-upon-Tyne, Tyne and Wear	Relegated from Premiership (12th)
Nottingham	Lady Bay Sports Ground	3,500	Nottingham, Nottinghamshire	7th
Yorkshire Carnegie	Headingley Carnegie Stadium	21,062	Leeds, West Yorkshire	6th

== Tables ==
At the date the Championship was suspended, the Championship table read as follows:

2019–20 RFU Championship table (to the date when play stopped due to COVID-19)
Pos	Team	Pld	W	D	L	PF	PA	PD	TB	LB	Pts
1	Newcastle Falcons (C)	15	15	0	0	486	151	+335	11	0	71
2	Ealing Trailfinders	14	11	1	2	491	253	+238	7	0	53
3	Cornish Pirates	15	11	0	4	377	234	+143	6	2	52
4	Coventry	15	8	1	6	399	318	+81	6	4	44
5	Ampthill	15	8	1	6	368	399	−31	6	0	40
6	Jersey Reds	14	6	0	8	320	350	−30	5	3	32
7	Nottingham	13	6	0	7	293	233	+60	4	3	31
8	Bedford Blues	15	6	0	9	253	325	−72	3	4	31
9	Doncaster Knights	15	6	0	9	268	351	−83	3	1	28
10	Hartpury	14	4	0	10	225	317	−92	3	5	24
11	London Scottish	13	3	1	9	226	288	−62	3	5	22
12	Yorkshire Carnegie (R)	13	0	0	13	166	647	−481	2	0	2

Updated to match(es) played on 14 March 2020. Source: "Greene King IPA Championship". England Rugby.
Rules for classification: If teams are level at any stage, tiebreakers are applied in the following order:
1. Number of matches won
2. Difference between points for and against
3. Total number of points for
4. Aggregate number of points scored in matches between tied teams
5. Number of matches won excluding the first match, then the second and so on until the tie is settled

On 4 April, the Rugby Football Union confirmed the final table for the season.

Final positions (with adjusted points)
Pos	Team	Pts^{*}	Promotion or relegation
1	Newcastle Falcons (C)	104.50	Promotion place
2	Ealing Trailfinders	83.42	
3	Cornish Pirates	75.43	
4	Coventry	65.80	
5	Ampthill	58.34	
6	Nottingham	50.88	
7	Jersey Reds	49.04	
8	Bedford Blues	46.36	
9	London Scottish	42.43	
10	Doncaster Knights	36.84 (Note: Doncaster deducted 5 points for use of an unregistered agent.)	
11	Hartpury	35.29	
12	Yorkshire Carnegie (R)	2.75	Relegation place

Updated to match(es) played on 4 April 2020. Source: "Greene King IPA Championship". England Rugby.

== Fixtures & Results ==
=== Round 1 ===
12 October 2019
14:30

Hartpury	8 – 20	Doncaster Knights
	Report

Gillman's Ground
Attendance: 935
Referee: Greg MacDonald

12 October 2019
15:00

Ampthill	20 – 44	Nottingham (1 BP)
	Report

Dillingham Park
Attendance: 762
Referee: George Selwood

12 October 2019
15:00

(1 BP) Jersey Reds	22 – 15	Coventry (1 BP)
	Report

Stade Santander International
Attendance: 1,135
Referee: Mathew Turvey

12 October 2019
15:00

(1 BP) London Scottish	13 – 17	Newcastle Falcons
	Report

Athletic Ground
Attendance: 1,014
Referee: Jack Makepeace

13 October 2019
14:30

(1 BP) Cornish Pirates	30 – 10	Ealing Trailfinders
	Report

Mennaye Field
Attendance: 1,772
Referee: Adam Leal

13 October 2019
15:00

Yorkshire Carnegie	14 – 34	Bedford Blues (1 BP)
	Report

Emerald Headingley Stadium
Attendance: 750
Referee: Hamish Smales

=== Round 2 ===
18 October 2019
19:45

Nottingham	17 – 14	London Scottish (1 BP)
	Report

Lady Bay Sports Ground
Attendance: 854
Referee: Greg MacDonald

18 October 2019
20:00

(1 BP) Newcastle Falcons	45 – 7	Hartpury
	Report

Kingston Park
Attendance: 4,206
Referee: Anthony Woodthorpe

19 October 2019
14:00

(1 BP) Ealing Trailfinders	52 – 38	Jersey Reds (1 BP)
	Report

Trailfinders Sports Ground
Attendance: 750
Referee: Sara Cox

19 October 2019
14:30

Doncaster Knights	25 – 47	Cornish Pirates (1 BP)
	Report

Castle Park
Attendance: 1,089
Referee: Fergus Kirby

19 October 2019
15:00

(1 BP) Ampthill	53 – 22	Yorkshire Carnegie
	Report

Dillingham Park
Attendance: 640
Referee: Michael Hudson

19 October 2019
15:00

(1 BP) Coventry	26 – 19	Bedford Blues (1 BP)
	Report

Butts Park Arena
Attendance: 2,128
Referee: Neil Chivers

=== Round 3 ===
25 October 2019
19:45

Bedford Blues	5 – 18	Ealing Trailfinders
	Report

Goldington Road
Attendance: 2,162
Referee: Greg Macdonald

25 October 2019
19:45

Hartpury	12 – 6	Nottingham (1 BP)
	Report

Gillman's Ground
Attendance: 1,146
Referee: Simon Harding

25 October 2019
19:45

(1 BP) Jersey Reds	27 – 0	Doncaster Knights
	Report

Stade Santander International
Attendance: 1,223
Referee: Neil Chivers

26 October 2019
15:00

London Scottish	6 – 6	Ampthill
	Report

Athletic Ground
Attendance: 788
Referee: Karl Dickson

27 October 2019
14:30

Cornish Pirates	9 – 18	Newcastle Falcons
	Report

Mennaye Field
Attendance: 2,975
Referee: Matt Turvey

27 October 2019
15:00

(1 BP) Yorkshire Carnegie	26 – 66	Coventry (1 BP)
	Report

Emerald Headingley Stadium
Attendance: 600
Referee: Andrew Jackson

=== Round 4 ===
1 November 2019
19:45

(1 BP) London Scottish	30 – 10	Yorkshire Carnegie
	Report

Athletic Ground
Attendance: 622
Referee: Neil Chivers

1 November 2019
19:45

Nottingham	14 – 23	Cornish Pirates
	Report

Lady Bay Sports Ground
Attendance: 1,023
Referee: Greg Macdonald

2 November 2019
13:00

(1 BP) Newcastle Falcons	42 – 19	Jersey Reds
	Report

Kingston Park
Attendance: 3,795
Referee: Karl Dickson

2 November 2019
14:15

Ampthill	19 – 13	Hartpury (1 BP)
	Report

Dillingham Park
Attendance: 701
Referee: Matthew Turvey

2 November 2019
14:30

Doncaster Knights	22 – 18	Bedford Blues (1 BP)
	Report

Castle Park
Attendance: 781
Referee: Andrew Jackson

2 November 2019
15:00

(1 BP) Ealing Trailfinders	28 – 28	Coventry (1 BP)
	Report

Trailfinders Sports Ground
Attendance: 625
Referee: Matthew Carley

=== Round 5 ===
8 November 2019
19:45

(1 BP) Hartpury	44 – 17	London Scottish
	Report

Gillman's Ground
Attendance: 785
Referee: Hamish Smales

9 November 2019
15:00

(1 BP) Bedford Blues	6 – 11	Newcastle Falcons
	Report

Goldington Road
Attendance: 2,772
Referee: Anthony Woodthorpe

9 November 2019
15:00

Coventry	18 – 6	Doncaster Knights
	Report

Butts Park Arena
Attendance: 2,386
Referee: Michael Hudson

9 November 2019
15:00

Jersey Reds	19 – 10	Nottingham

Stade Santander International
Attendance: 848
Referee: George Selwood

10 November 2019
14:30

(1 BP) Cornish Pirates	40 – 11	Ampthill
	Report

Mennaye Field
Attendance: 1,664
Referee: Dean Richards

10 November 2019
15:00

Yorkshire Carnegie	13 – 66	Ealing Trailfinders (1 BP)
	Report

Emerald Headingley Stadium
Attendance: 500
Referee: Jack Makepeace

=== Round 6 ===
15 November 2019
19:45

London Scottish	25 – 24	Cornish Pirates (1 BP)
	Report

Athletic Ground
Attendance: 1,136
Referee: Matt Turvey

16 November 2019
14:15

(1 BP) Ampthill	38 – 47	Jersey Reds (1 BP)
	Report

Dillingham Park
Attendance: 790
Referee: Luke Pearce

16 November 2019
14:30

(1 BP) Hartpury	45 – 12	Yorkshire Carnegie
	Report

Gillman's Ground
Attendance: 878
Referee: Luke Pearce

16 November 2019
14:30

Doncaster Knights	9 – 24	Ealing Trailfinders
	Report

Castle Park
Attendance: 988
Referee: Tim Wigglesworth

17 November 2019
15:00

(1 BP) Newcastle Falcons	47 – 7	Coventry
	Report

Kingston Park
Attendance: 4,909
Referee: Fergus Kirby

17 November 2019
15:00

(1 BP) Nottingham	29 – 14	Bedford Blues
	Report

Lady Bay Sports Ground
Attendance: 1,055
Referee: Michael Hudson

=== Round 7 ===
21 December 2019
14:00

(1 BP) Jersey Reds	10 – 13	London Scottish
	Report

Stade Santander International
Attendance: 1,002
Referee: Fergus Kirby

21 December 2019
15:00

Ealing Trailfinders	14 – 26	Newcastle Falcons (1 BP)
	Report

Trailfinders Sports Ground
Attendance: 1,950
Referee: Adam Leal

21 December 2019
17:30

Coventry	25 – 11	Nottingham
	Report

Butts Park Arena
Attendance: 3,117
Referee: Hamish Smales

22 December 2019
14:30

Cornish Pirates	6 – 0	Hartpury (1 BP)
	Report

Mennaye Field
Attendance: 1,928
Referee: Dean Richards

22 December 2019
15:00

Yorkshire Carnegie	19 – 40	Doncaster Knights (1 BP)

Emerald Headingley Stadium
Attendance: 750

26 December 2019
15:00

Bedford Blues	10 – 23	Ampthill
	Report

Goldington Road
Attendance: 5,000
Referee: Anthony Woodthorpe

=== Round 8 ===
10 January 2020
19:45

(1 BP) London Scottish	17 – 24	Bedford Blues
	Report

Athletic Ground
Attendance: 906
Referee: Simon Harding

10 January 2020
19:45

Nottingham	10 – 18	Ealing Trailfinders
	Report

Lady Bay Sports Ground
Attendance: 850
Referee: Alex Thomas

10 January 2020
20:00

(1 BP) Newcastle Falcons	34 – 10	Doncaster Knights
	Report

Kingston Park
Attendance: 4,820
Referee: Hamish Smales

11 January 2020
13:30

(1 BP) Hartpury	9 – 10	Jersey Reds
	Report

Gillman's Ground
Attendance: 943
Referee: George Selwood

11 January 2020
14:15

Ampthill	19 – 17	Coventry (1 BP)
	Report

Dillingham Park
Attendance: 1,016
Referee: Dean Richards

12 January 2020
14:30

(1 BP) Cornish Pirates	52 – 0	Yorkshire Carnegie
	Report

Mennaye Field
Attendance: 1,572
Referee: Fergus Kirby

=== Round 9 ===
18 January 2020
14:00

Jersey Reds	10 – 23	Cornish Pirates
	Report

Stade Santander International
Attendance: 1,501
Referee: Adam Leal

18 January 2020
14:30

Doncaster Knights	16 – 15	Nottingham (1 BP)
	Report

Castle Park
Attendance: 1,203
Referee: Dean Richards

18 January 2020
15:00

Bedford Blues	28 – 23	Hartpury (1 BP)
	Report

Goldington Road
Attendance: 2,474
Referee: Wayne Barnes

18 January 2020
15:00

(1 BP) Coventry	36 – 30	London Scottish (2 BP)
	Report

Butts Park Arena
Attendance: 2,545
Referee: Greg MacDonald

18 January 2020
15:00

(1 BP) Ealing Trailfinders	77 – 26	Ampthill (1 BP)
	Report

Trailfinders Sports Ground
Attendance: 680
Referee: Neil Chivers

19 January 2020
15:00

Yorkshire Carnegie	10 – 36	Newcastle Falcons (1 BP)
	Report

Emerald Headingley Stadium
Attendance: 2,121
Referee: Joe James

=== Round 10 ===
24 January 2020
19:45

(1 BP) Jersey Reds	56 – 17	Yorkshire Carnegie
	Report

Stade Santander International
Attendance: 1,312
Referee: Simon Harding

24 January 2020
19:45

(1 BP) London Scottish	26 – 42	Ealing Trailfinders (1 BP)
	Report

Athletic Ground
Attendance: 918
Referee: Fergus Kirby

24 January 2020
19:45

(1 BP) Nottingham	12 – 19	Newcastle Falcons
	Report

Lady Bay Sports Ground
Attendance: 2,092
Referee: Tim Wigglesworth

25 January 2020
14:15

(1 BP) Ampthill	30 – 26	Doncaster Knights (2 BP)
	Report

Dillingham Park
Attendance: 980
Referee: Greg McDonald

25 January 2020
14:30

Hartpury	23 – 20	Coventry (1 BP)
	Report

Gillman's Ground
Attendance: 920
Referee: Sara Cox

26 January 2020
14:30

Cornish Pirates	18 – 15	Bedford Blues (1 BP)
	Report

Mennaye Field
Attendance: 1,635
Referee: Christophe Ridley

=== Round 11 ===
31 January 2020
19:45

Yorkshire Carnegie	10 – 62	Nottingham (1 BP)
	Report

Emerald Headingley Stadium
Attendance: 882 (Note: Yorkshire Carnegie's attendance v Nottingham on 31 January 2020 was incorrectly given as 826 in The Rugby Paper, with the official figure provided by Yorkshire Carnegie instead being 882.)
Referee: Andrew Jackson

1 February 2020
14:30

Doncaster Knights	15 – 13	London Scottish (1 BP)
	Report

Castle Park
Attendance: 1,075
Referee: Jack Makepeace

1 February 2020
15:00

(1 BP) Bedford Blues	27 – 25	Jersey Reds (1 BP)
	Report

Goldington Road
Attendance: 2,132
Referee: Hamish Smales

1 February 2020
15:00

Coventry	28 – 23	Cornish Pirates (1 BP)
	Report

Butts Park Arena
Attendance: 2,786
Referee: Neil Chivers

1 February 2020
15:00

(1 BP) Ealing Trailfinders	59 – 5	Hartpury
	Report

Trailfinders Sports Ground
Attendance: 630
Referee: Hamish Grant

2 February 2020
13:00

(1 BP) Newcastle Falcons	45 – 29	Ampthill (1 BP)
	Report

Kingston Park
Attendance: 4,906
Referee: George Selwood

=== Round 12 ===
7 February 2020
19:45

Bedford Blues	19 – 15	Coventry (1 BP)
	Report

Goldington Road
Attendance: 2,612
Referee: Karl Dickson

7 February 2020
19:45

London Scottish	17 – 30	Nottingham
	Report

Athletic Ground
Attendance: 640
Referee: Adam Leal

8 February 2020
14:00

(1 BP) Jersey Reds	24 – 28	Ealing Trailfinders
	Report

Stade Santander International
Attendance: 1,016
Referee: Anthony Woodthorpe

8 February 2020
14:30

Hartpury	5 – 26	Newcastle Falcons (1 BP)
	Report

Gillman's Ground
Attendance: 1,473
Referee: Fergus Kirby

9 February 2020
14:30

(1 BP) Cornish Pirates	27 – 10	Doncaster Knights
	Report

Mennaye Field
Attendance: 1,285
Referee: Alexander Thomas

9 February 2020
15:00

Yorkshire Carnegie	P – P	Ampthill

Emerald Headingley Stadium

- Game postponed due to bad weather (storm). Game to be rescheduled to 22 February 2020.

=== Round 13 ===
14 February 2020
19:45

(1 BP) Nottingham	33 – 26	Hartpury (2 BP)
	Report

Lady Bay Sports Ground
Attendance: 865
Referee: Tim Wigglesworth

15 February 2020
14:15

Ampthill	13 – 5	London Scottish
	Report

Dillingham Park
Attendance: 467
Referee: Jack Makepeace

15 February 2020
14:30

Doncaster Knights	38 – 10	Jersey Reds
	Report

Castle Park
Attendance: 1,048
Referee: Sara Cox

15 February 2020
15:00

(1 BP) Coventry	55 – 3	Yorkshire Carnegie

Butts Park Arena
Attendance: 1,932
Referee: Joe James

15 February 2020
15:00

(1 BP) Ealing Trailfinders	38 – 5	Bedford Blues
	Report

Trailfinders Sports Ground
Attendance: 780 (Note: Ealing Trailfinders attendance v Bedford Blues on 15 February 2020 was incorrectly given as 680 in The Rugby Paper, with the official figure provided by Ealing instead being 780.)
Referee: Andrew Jackson

16 February 2020
15:00

(1 BP) Newcastle Falcons	40 – 7	Cornish Pirates
	Report

Kingston Park
Attendance: 6,315
Referee: Adam Leal

=== Round 12 (rescheduled game) ===
22 February 2020
14:00

Yorkshire Carnegie	10 – 52	Ampthill (1 BP)
	Report

Emerald Headingley Stadium
Attendance: 300
Referee: Alex Thomas

- Game rescheduled from 9 February 2020.

=== Round 14 ===
28 February 2020
19:45

Coventry	8 – 17	Ealing Trailfinders
	Report

Butts Park Arena
Attendance: 2,231
Referee: George Selwood

28 February 2020
19:45

Hartpury	5 – 16	Ampthill
	Report

Gillman's Ground
Attendance: 578
Referee: Dean Richards

29 February 2020
15:00

(1 BP) Bedford Blues	29 – 5	Doncaster Knights
	Report

Goldington Road
Attendance: 2,324
Referee: Simon Harding

29 February 2020
15:00

Jersey Reds	3 – 38	Newcastle Falcons (1 BP)
	Report

Stade Santander International
Attendance: 1,892
Referee: Karl Dickson

1 March 2020
14:30

Cornish Pirates	21 – 15	Nottingham (1 BP)
	Report

Mennaye Field
Attendance: 1,541
Referee: Sara Cox

1 March 2020
15:00

(1 BP) Yorkshire Carnegie	26 – 73	London Scottish (1 BP)
	Report

Emerald Headingley Stadium
Attendance: 306
Referee: Anthony Woodthorpe

=== Round 15 ===
13 March 2020
20:00

(1 BP) Newcastle Falcons	41 – 0	Bedford Blues
	Report

Kingston Park
Attendance: 3,999
Referee: Andrew Jackson

14 March 2020
14:15

Ampthill	13 – 30	Cornish Pirates (1 BP)
	Report

Dillingham Park
Attendance: 1,208
Referee: Simon Harding

14 March 2020
14:30

Doncaster Knights	26 – 35	Coventry (1 BP)
	Report

Castle Park
Attendance: 1,115
Referee: Mike Hudson

14 March 2020
14:30

Nottingham	P – P	Jersey Reds

Lady Bay Sports Ground

- Cancelled due to the COVID-19 pandemic.

14 March 2020
15:00

Ealing Trailfinders	P – P	Yorkshire Carnegie

Trailfinders Sports Ground

- Cancelled due to the COVID-19 pandemic.

14 March 2020
15:00

Hartpury	P – P	London Scottish

Gillman's Ground

- Cancelled due to the COVID-19 pandemic.

== Attendances ==
Club	Home Games	Total	Average	Highest	Lowest	% Capacity
Ampthill	8	6,564	821	1,208	467	27%
Bedford Blues	7	19,476	2,782	5,000	2,132	56%
Cornish Pirates	8	14,372	1,797	2,975	1,285	45%
Coventry	7	17,125	2,446	3,117	1,932	61%
Doncaster Knights	7	7,299	1,043	1,203	781	21%
Ealing Trailfinders	6	5,415	903	1,950	625	23%
Hartpury	8	7,658	957	1,473	578	48%
Jersey Reds	8	9,929	1,241	1,892	848	31%
London Scottish	7	6,024	861	1,136	622	19%
Newcastle Falcons	7	32,950	4,707	6,315	3,795	46%
Nottingham	6	6,739	1,123	2,092	850	32%
Yorkshire Carnegie	8	6,209	776	2,121	300	4%

== Individual statistics ==
- Note that points scorers includes tries as well as conversions, penalties and drop goals. Appearance figures also include coming on as substitutes (unused substitutes not included).

=== Top points scorers ===
Rank	Player	Team	Points
1	(England) Louis Grimoldby	Ampthill	112
1	(England) Rory Jennings	Coventry	112
1	(England) Sam Olver	Doncaster Knights	112
2	(Argentina) Javier Rojas Alvarez	Cornish Pirates	108
3	(England) Craig Willis	Ealing Trailfinders	82
4	(England) Josh Bragman	Hartpury College	77
5	(Wales) Steven Shingler	Ealing Trailfinders	70
6	(Canada) Shane O'Leary	Nottingham	65
7	(England) Brendan Cope	Jersey Reds	60

=== Top try scorers ===
Rank	Player	Team	Tries
1	(England) George McGuigan	Newcastle Falcons	10
1	(England) Adam Radwan	Newcastle Falcons	10
2	(Ireland) Callum Patterson	Cornish Pirates	9
2	(England) Jack Spittle	Nottingham	9
3	(New Zealand) Antonio Harris	Jersey Reds	8
3	(England) Ryan Hutler	Bedford Blues	8
3	(England) David Williams	Nottingham	8
4	(England) Sam Baker	Ampthill	7
4	(England) Matt Cornish	Ealing Trailfinders	7
4	(England) Luke Frost	London Scottish	7
4	(England) Reon Joseph	Ealing Trailfinders	7

== Season records ==
=== Team ===
Largest home win — 52 points (2)

52 – 0 Cornish Pirates at home to Yorkshire Carnegie on 12 January 2020
55 – 3 Coventry at home to Yorkshire Carnegie on 15 February 2020

Largest away win — 53 points

66 – 13 Ealing Trailfinders away to Yorkshire Carnegie on 10 November 2019

Most points scored — 77 points

77 – 26 Ealing Trailfinders at home to Ampthill on 18 January 2020

Most tries in a match — 11 (2)

Ealing Trailfinders at home to Ampthill on 18 January 2020
London Scottish away to Yorkshire Carnegie on 1 March 2020

Most conversions in a match — 10

Ealing Trailfinders at home to Ampthill on 18 January 2020

Most penalties in a match — 5 (2)

Coventry away to Jersey Reds on 12 October 2019
Doncaster Knights at home to Bedford Blues on 2 November 2019

Most drop goals in a match — 0

=== Attendances ===
Highest — 6,315

Newcastle Falcons at home to Cornish Pirates on 16 February 2020

Lowest — 300

Yorkshire Carnegie at home to Ampthill on 22 February 2020

Highest average attendance — 4,707

Newcastle Falcons

Lowest average attendance — 776

Yorkshire Carnegie

=== Player ===
Most points in a match — 25

(England) Jack Spittle for Nottingham away to Yorkshire Carnegie on 31 January 2020

Most tries in a match — 5

(England) Jack Spittle for Nottingham away to Yorkshire Carnegie on 31 January 2020

Most conversions in a match — 8

(England) Harry Sheppard for London Scottish away to Yorkshire Carnegie on 1 March 2020

Most penalties in a match — 5 (2)

(England) Rory Jennings for Coventry away to Jersey Reds on 12 October 2019
(England) Sam Olver for Doncaster Knights at home to Bedford Blues on 2 November 2019

Most drop goals in a match — 0
