= Ben Betts =

Ben Betts may refer to:

- Ben Betts (basketball) (born 1968), American basketball coach
- Ben Betts (rugby union) (born 1996), Irish rugby union player
