= Darrell Dyer =

England rugby union player

Darrell Dyer (born 1 November 1992 (age 33)) is an English rugby union player.

He was on the books at Northampton Saints and played for Ampthill RUFC, Coventry R.F.C., Bedford Blues, and Hartpury University R.F.C. where he featured both as a blindside-flanker and number eight. In 2018 Dyer moved to France and joined US Carcassonne to play in the Rugby Pro D2 league, however on 1 June 2021 it was announced he was leaving Carcassonne to join Valence Romans Drôme Rugby for the 2021-22 season.
