= Marc Thomas (rugby union) =

Welsh rugby union player

- Born: 15 July 1990 (age 36) Merthyr Tydfil, Wales
- Height: 183 cm (6 ft 0 in)
- Weight: 114 kg (17 st 13 lb; 251 lb)

Rugby union career
- Position: Prop
Senior career
Years	Team	Apps	(Points)
2012–2016	Ospreys	42	(0)
2016	Jersey Reds	14	(10)
2016–2017	Cardiff Blues	4	(0)
2017–2019	Yorkshire Carnegie	26	(5)
2019–2020	Doncaster Knights	19	(0)
2020	Harlequins	5	(0)
2020–2022	Worcester Warriors	0	(0)

Marc Thomas (born 15 July 1990) is a Welsh rugby union player who plays in the prop forward position.

Thomas previously played for Bridgend RFC and the Ospreys. On 4 May 2016, Thomas joined RFU Championship club Jersey Reds from the 2016–17 season. However, on 3 February 2017, Thomas left the club with immediate effect to join Welsh region Cardiff Blues back in the Pro12.

On 24 July 2017, Thomas returned to the English Championship with Yorkshire Carnegie prior to the 2017–18 season.

He joined rival Championship club Doncaster Knights ahead of the 2019–20 season. Thomas joined Harlequins on a short-term deal for the end of the 2020 and subsequently at the end of that deal, signed with Worcester Warriors for the start of the 2020–21 season.
