= Ben Nutley =

English rugby union player

- Born: 7 April 1992 (age 34) Luton, England
- Height: 1.85 m (6 ft 1 in)
- Weight: 106 kg (16 st 10 lb)

Rugby union career
- Position: Flanker / Lock
Amateur team(s)
Years	Team	Apps	(Points)
–2010	Luton RFC		
Senior career
Years	Team	Apps	(Points)
2010–	Northampton Saints	81	(30)
- Correct as of 3 April 2018
International career
Years	Team	Apps	(Points)
2010–11	England U19	1	(5)
2011–12	England U20	5	(0)
- Correct as of 6 June 2017

Ben Nutley (born 7 April 1992) is an English rugby union player for RFU Championship side Coventry RFC. He began his career at hometown club Luton RFC before joining Saints' Academy in 2010. He plays as a Flanker or a Lock.

== Club career ==
Nutley was born in Luton and began his rugby career at Luton RFC after giving up a promising football career as a goalkeeper with Luton Town FC's youth team.

Before the start of the 2010–11 season, he secured a one-year contract with Northampton Saints academy. He was a regular with the Wanderers (Northampton Saints "A" Team), including captaining them. He made his 1st Team debut on 7 November 2010, away to Saracens in the LV= Cup, the first of three appearances that season.

He made his Aviva Premiership debut against Gloucester in the club’s opening fixture of the 2011–12 season and became a regular in the team including four Heineken Cup appearances.

Competing for a place in a team that featured a number of internationals (not least Phil Dowson and Tom Wood), Nutley managed to win ten 1st Team appearances in 2012–13 while captaining the Wanderers to a second successive Aviva A League semi-final.

Most recently stepping out with the Saints' second team side the Northampton Wanderers, Nutley helped the side lift the Aviva 'A' League trophy as they beat Gloucester United in the final at Franklin's Gardens.

Ben's twin brother, Tom, plays with National League 1 club Blaydon.

== International career ==
Nutley was selected to play for England Under 19s in 2010–11. He scored a try on his debut in a 13–31 victory over Ireland in Dublin on 31 December 2010.

He went on to the England Under 20s in 2011–12. He played in the Under 20s Six Nations, making his first appearance in the 7–42 win over Italy in Rovigo on 3 March 2012. He took part in the Junior World Championship, appearing against South Africa, Ireland (twice) and Australia.
