= Jack Preece (rugby union) =

English rugby union player

- Born: August 1, 1989 (age 37)
- Height: 5 ft 10 in (1.78 m)
- Weight: 98 kg (216 lb)

Rugby union career
- Position(s): Flanker, Hooker
National sevens team
Years	Team	Comps
- England

Jack Preece (born 1 August 1989) is a professional rugby union player for Cinderford in National League 1. Preece plays at both openside flanker and hooker and is well known as an out 'n' out ball stealer. Prior to signing for Coventry Preece played his part in two season with Gloucestershire U20's, becoming top try scorer and helping them win the Counties final 2yrs running. He then spent a season with Gloucestershire seniors, again reaching the final at Twickenham. Preece is a former England Counties XV cap, making his debut off the bench versus a Madrid XV in 2011 and went on to play In all 3 games including Spain and was named player of the tournament. During this time (2007-2012) Preece played for Birmingham and Solihull RFC for 5 seasons, from the age of 17, scoring on his debut at just 18yrs old and becoming the youngest try score at level 2 at that time, he then went on to captain the side for the 2011–2012 season, and during his time there he made 104 appearances and won player's player and supporter's player of the year in consecutive years. He also spent a year as a centrally contracted player with England Sevens. He made his debut for England Sevens in the first leg of the European Sevens Grand Prix Series in June 2012 in Lyon. Whilst playing for England Sevens in the Moscow leg of the same series Preece suffered a serious ACL injury which required reconstructive surgery and ruled him out of adding to his England appearances during 2012.

In 2013 Preece joined Championship team Rotherham Titians for 3 seasons making the playoffs 2 years running and was awarded the Vice Presidents player of the year award. In his third and final year he changed position to hooker and made a total of 71 appearances.

Preece has made the Championship Dream team at Openside flanker on two occasions, once with Birmingham and Solihull in 2009/10 season and with Rotherham Titans 2014/15 season where he became the clubs seasons leading try score of 15.

For the 2016/17 season, Preece signed for Birmingham Moseley Rugby Club. He made 28 appearances out of 30 for Moseley missing only two games where he was once again selected to play for England Counties, this time against Scotland and Ireland. During his time there Preece was named Moseley's players player of the year, and was named in the 2016/17 National One Dream Team at Openside flanker. Preece ended the season with another selection for the England Counties two game summer tour to Spain.

In the 2017/18 season Jack Preece signed for Coventry and made a total of 27 appearances. During this season Jack was voted the (MVP) Most Valuable Player award by the supporters and also received the Players Player of the year award. Coventry became National one Title winners and won promotion to the Championship. Preece ended the season once again being named in the Rugby papers 2017/18 National One Dream Team at open-side flanker and was also named National League One Player of the year. In 2019/20 Jack preece signs for championship side Hartpury. 2020/ 22 joined Cinderford 2022/ 2023 Preece has re joined his childhood club Old Centrailians where he now plays alongside many of his cousins. In pre season against a team from newport he assisted with two tries.

Accolades:

2007/8. Pertemp Bees, - Gloucestershire U20's Counties winner- 2008/9. Pertemp Bees, - Gloucestershire U20's Counties winner-

2009/10 Birmingham and Solihull - Players player award, Supporters player award, Championship Dream Team. Gloucestershire Counties 2010/11. Birmingham and Solihull - Players player award, Supporters player award, Gloucestershire Counties, England Counties - 2011/12. Birmingham and Solihull, Club Captain-

2012/13. England 7's-

2013/16 Rotherham - Championship Dream Team, Vice Presidents Player of the year-

2016/17. Moseley - Players player award, National One Dream Team, Gloucestershire Counties, England Counties-

2017/18. Coventry - Most valuable player award, Players player award, National One Dream Team, -National One Player of the Year.- 2018/19. Coventry

== International career ==
Preece is a former England Counties XV cap, making his debut off the bench versus a Madrid XV in 2011 and went on to play all 3 games .

He made his debut for England Sevens in the first leg of the European Sevens Grand Prix Series in June 2012 in Lyon.

Whilst playing for England Sevens in the Moscow leg of the same series Preece suffered a serious ACL injury which required reconstructive surgery and ruled him out of adding to his England appearances during 2012.
