= Alex Giltrow =

English rugby union player

- Born: 5 July 1991 (age 35) Weston-super-Mare, England
- Height: 1.88 m (6 ft 2 in)
- Weight: 121 kg (19 st 1 lb)
- School: Backwell School
- University: University West of England

Rugby union career
- Position: Prop
Amateur team(s)
| Years | Team | Apps | (Points) |
| ?-2015 | Clevedon | | |
Senior career
| Years | Team | Apps | (Points) |
| 2015-2017 | Clifton RFC | 24 | (30) |
| 2017-2018 | Bristol | 3 | (0) |
| 2018-2018 | →Clifton RFC(loan) | 3 | |
| 2018- | Clifton RFC | | |

Alex Giltrow (born 5 July 1991) is an English rugby union player who plays for Clifton RFC.

Giltrow has represented England students, after impressing for his university side. University of Western England. Whilst playing for Clevedon Rugby Club, Giltrow was apparently spotted by Clifton RFC Director of Rugby in a chip shop. Once the conversation turned to rugby he was invited to Clifton's pre-season training. Joining Clifton in National League 2 South for the 2015-2016 campaign. In the next season he became a first team regular. Appearing 24 times and as a tighthead prop he managed to score an impressive 6 tries. Giltrow was awarded by Clifton Rugby management, the Coach's Player of the season title.

On 13 September 2017, he was signed by Bristol ahead of the 2017-18 RFU Championship season, having come through a successful trial.

He was released by Bristol in April 2018. Soon re-joining his former side Clifton RFC ahead of the 2018-19 Rugby Union season.
