= Steve Palframan =

South African cricketer (born 1970)

Cricket information
- Batting: Right-handed
- Bowling: Wicket-keeper
- Source: Cricinfo, 7 March 2006

Steven John Palframan (born 12 May 1970) is a former South African international cricketer.

Palframan was born in East London, Cape Province. He played seven One Day Internationals in 1996. He was a wicket-keeper. He also played in the 1996 Cricket World Cup.

He scored 55 runs at the One Day Internationals, with an batting average of 13.75. His highest score was 28.
