= Richard Palframan =

- Full name: Richard James Palframan
- Born: 20 December 1993 (age 32) East London, South Africa
- Height: 1.86 m (6 ft 1 in)
- Weight: 120 kg (18 st 13 lb; 265 lb)
- School: Rondebosch Boys' High School
- Notable relative: Steve Palframan (father)

Rugby union career
- Position: Prop
- Current team: Newcastle Falcons
Youth career
- 2012: Sharks
Senior career
| Years | Team | Apps | (Points) |
| 2012-2018 | London Irish | 28 | (10) |
| 2018-2019 | London Scottish | 17 | (0) |
| 2019-2021 | Worcester Warriors | 43 | (15) |
| 2021- | Newcastle Falcons | 13 | (0) |

Richard Palframan (born 20 December 1993) is a South African professional rugby union player who completes for Newcastle Falcons in the Premiership Rugby.

Palframan began his career in his native South Africa where he was educated at Rondebosch High School in Cape Town and played Under-19s rugby for Sharks. He came to England in 2012 and joined the London Irish Academy as an 18-year-old. He made his senior debut for Irish in the European Rugby Challenge Cup in 2013 but was sidelined for almost 18 months during 2015/16 season by injury. Palframan scored three tries in 13 games for Irish during the 2016/17 season.

On 5 June 2018, Palframan left the Exiles for the other Exiles, which are London Scottish in the RFU Championship for the 2018–19 season.

After one season, Palframan returned to the Premiership Rugby with Worcester Warriors from the 2019–20 season. Palframan made his Warriors debut as a replacement in the Premiership Rugby Cup match at Bath in September 2019 but suffered a head injury within two minutes of taking the field and took no further part in the match. He recovered to play the second half of the Premiership Rugby Cup match at Wasps two weeks later. Palframan made his first Premiership start for Warriors in the win at Harlequins in November 2019. Palframan scored his first Warriors try in the European Rugby Challenge Cup victory over Enisei-STM in Russia the following week.

On 10 June 2021, Palframan signed for Premiership rivals Newcastle Falcons from the 2021-22 season.
