= Matt Beesley =

English rugby union player

- Full name: Matthew Beesley
- Born: 3 April 1992 (age 34) Sandbach, England
- Height: 1.88 m (6 ft 2 in)
- Weight: 123 kg (19 st 5 lb; 271 lb)
- University: Leeds Beckett University

Rugby union career
- Position: Prop/Hooker
- Current team: Northampton Saints
Youth career
- 2011–2014: Leeds Beckett University
Senior career
Years	Team	Apps	(Points)
2013–2016	Wharfedale	65	(20)
2016–2018	Northampton Saints	9	(0)
2016–2018	→ Ampthill	6	(0)
2018–	Ealing Trailfinders	10	(0)
- Correct as of 03 April 2018

Matthew Beesley (born 3 April 1992) is an English rugby union player who played for Northampton Saints. He joined the team at the start of the 2016–17 season, after previously spending two seasons at National League 1 side Wharfedale. He can play as a prop or a hooker.

== Rugby career ==
=== Early career ===
Beesley was born in Sandbach, Cheshire in 1992 and he started his playing days at his local club, Sandbach RUFC. He went to the Leeds Beckett University to study for a Sport Science degree and played rugby for the university's first team. He helped the side reach the 2014 BUCS Championship Final, which they lost 24–28 to Hartpury College at Twickenham on 28 March 2014. During his time in Leeds, Beesley was also a member of Championship side Yorkshire Carnegie's academy training squad.

=== Wharfedale ===
After making two appearances for National League 1 side Wharfedale in the 2013–14 season, he joined them on a full-time basis for the 2014–15 season. He played in the third tier of English rugby for two full seasons; his side finished in 11th position in his first season, but a poor 2015–16 season saw the team finish in 14th position on the table, resulting in a relegation to the National League 2 North for 2016–17.

=== Northampton Saints ===
Despite being a member of the Wharfedale team that got relegated, Beesley's performances did not go unnoticed and he was invited to Premiership side Northampton Saints for a trial. He trained with the Saints for a number of weeks in March 2016, where he also played for the Saints' second team, the Northampton Wanderers, in the Aviva A League. On 31 March, the Saints announced that they agreed terms with Beesley to join them on a full-time basis.

=== Ampthill ===
Beesley made a quick return to the National League 1, however, as he signed with Ampthill on a dual-registration basis.

=== Ealing Trailfinders ===
On 16 April 2018, Beesley left Northampton and Ampthill to sign for RFU Championship side Ealing Trailfinders from the 2018–19 season.

=== Representative rugby ===
Beesley represented both Cheshire Under-20s and Cheshire at county level, and was also selected for England Counties XV and England Students.
