= Charlie Beech =

English rugby union player

- Born: Charles Beech; 21 July 1987 (age 39) Stevenage, Hertfordshire
- Height: 1.85 m (6 ft 1 in)
- Weight: 120 kg (18 st 13 lb; 265 lb)
- School: Oakham School
- Notable relative: Ian McGeechan Graham Poll

Rugby union career
- Position: Prop
- Current team: Coventry
Youth career
- 1995–2002: Biggleswade Rugby Club
Senior career
Years	Team	Apps	(Points)
2003–2007	Northampton Saints	1	(0)
2007–2011	Wasps	15	(10)
2011–2014	Bath Rugby	17	(10)
2014–2018	Yorkshire Carnegie	83	(9)
2018-	Coventry		
- Correct as of 21 February 2012
International career
Years	Team	Apps	(Points)
2005-06	England U20s	4	(0)

Charlie Beech (born 21 July 1987 in Stevenage, England) is a rugby union player for Coventry R.F.C. in the RFU Championship. He plays as a prop.

Beech represented England at the U19 World Championship in 2006. Beech also represented the England under-20 team in the 2007 Six Nations.

Beech joined the academy of Northampton Saints in 2003, he made one appearance for their senior side, against Rugby Viadana in the European Challenge Cup. After Saints were relegated in the 2006–07 season, Beech signed for London Wasps.

Beech made his competitive debut for Wasps against London Irish, in their first win of the 2007–08 Guinness Premiership. He would have to wait another 13 months before his next appearance, when he scored a match winning try against the Newcastle Falcons. In April 2009, Beech signed a contract.

It was announced on 8 March 2011 that Beech had signed for Bath on a three-year deal. In October 2013, Beech signed for Yorkshire Carnegie on an indefinite loan from the rest of the 2013–14 season. However, he signed a permanent deal with Yorkshire Carnegie, effectively leaving Bath.

On 8 April 2018, Beech left Leeds to join Championship rivals Coventry
