= Ben Sowrey =

English rugby union player

- Born: Ben Sowrey; 5 February 1991 (age 35) Yorkshire, England
- Height: 1.83 m (6 ft 0 in)
- Weight: 108 kg (17 st 0 lb)

Rugby union career
- Position: Hooker
Senior career
Years	Team	Apps	(Points)
2012–2013	Doncaster Knights	0	(0)
2013–2014	Rotherham Titans	18	(0)
2014–2016	Worcester Warriors	8	(0)
2016–2018	Newcastle Falcons	0	(0)
2018–2019	Wharfedale	0	(0)
2019–	Yorkshire Carnegie	0	(0)
- Correct as of 26 December 2017

Ben Sowrey (born 2 May 1991) is an English rugby union player who plays for Yorkshire Carnegie in the RFU Championship.

Sowrey first played professionally for Doncaster Knights before joining Rotherham Titans in the RFU Championship during the 2013-14 season.

On 22 February 2014, Sowrey made move to Worcester Warriors in the Aviva Premiership from the 2014-15 season. On 28 April 2016, Sowrey signed for Premiership rivals Newcastle Falcons ahead of the 2016-17 season.

Playing for Worcester Warriors Ben made 20 appearances, Warriors won the British and Irish cup and won the Championship League. Ben made 29 appearances for Newcastle Falcons, 18 in the Aviva Premiership. In 2018 Newcastle finished 4th in the league and semifinals of the European Challenge Cup, and the semi-final of the Anglo Welsh Cup.

On 4 July 2018, Sowrey signed for Wharfedale in the third division National League 1 from the 2018-19 season. On 19 September 2019, Sowrey signed a one-year deal to return to the RFU Championship with Yorkshire Carnegie for the 2019-20 season.
