= Howard Packman =

English rugby union player

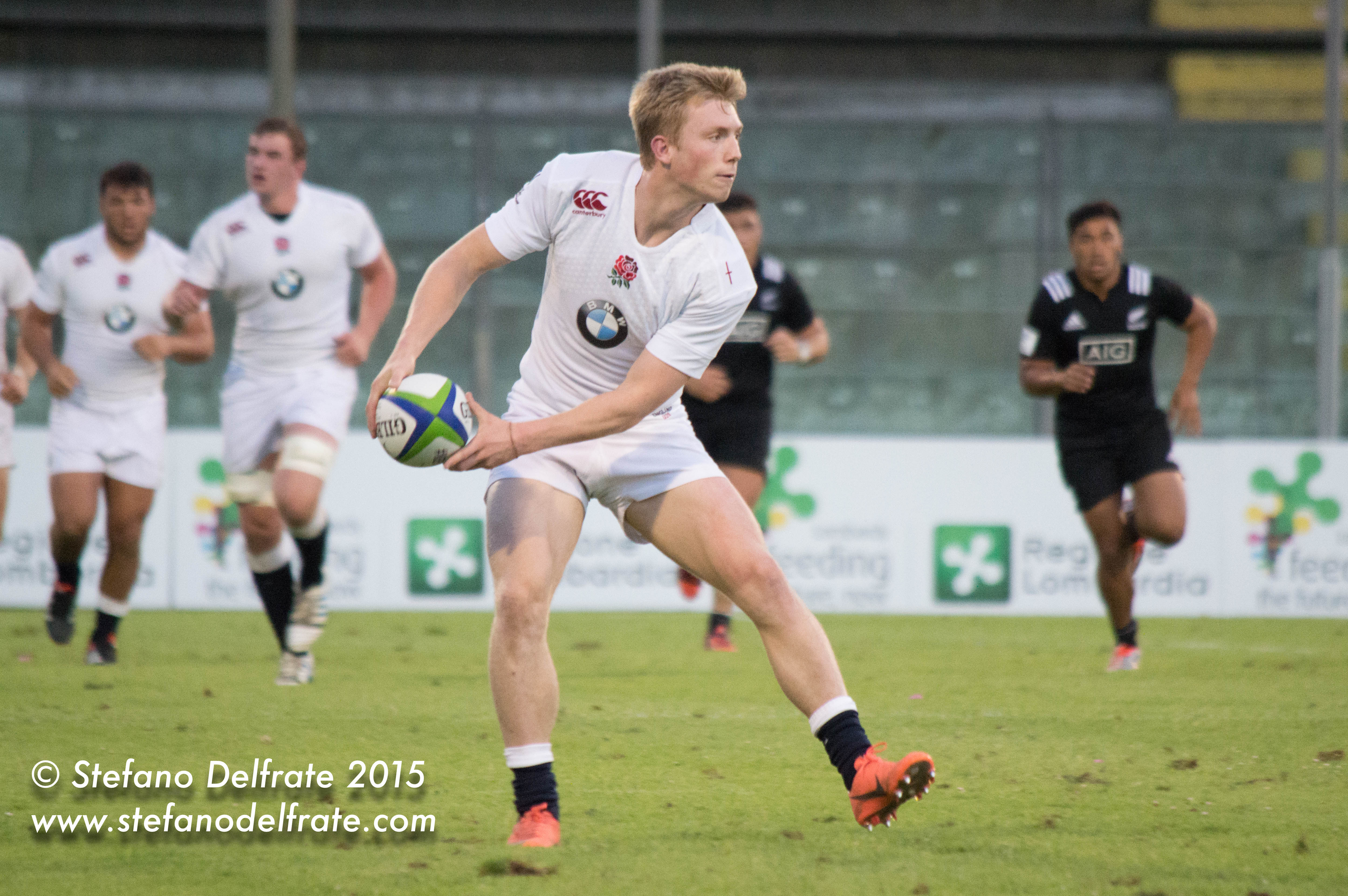
- Born: 8 June 1995 (age 31) Northampton, England
- Height: 183 cm (6 ft 0 in)
- Weight: 92 kg (203 lb; 14 st 7 lb)

Rugby union career
- Position: Wing
- Current team: North Otago
Senior career
Years	Team	Apps	(Points)
2013–2016	Northampton Saints	7	(20)
2015	Birmingham Moseley	1	(0)
2016	London Scottish	6	(5)
2017	Rotherham Titans	1	(0)
2017–2018	Bedford Blues	17	(35)
2018–	Ealing Trailfinders	5	(5)
2019–	North Otago	5	(20)
- Correct as of 26 July 2019
International career
Years	Team	Apps	(Points)
2014–2015	England U20	17	(28)
2025–	Germany	0	(0)
- Correct as of 26 July 2019
National sevens team
Years	Team		Comps
2014	England		2
- Correct as of 22 September 2019

Howard Packman is a rugby union player who plays for Ealing Trailfinders.

The young winger began his rugby career aged just five years old when he joined Wellingborough RFC, moving to Old Northamptonians just two years later. Always local to Northampton, Packman followed in the footsteps of his father, Frank, who played for Saints 376 times between 1982 and 1996 and joined the Northampton club's academy.

Making his senior début for the club aged just 18-years old in 2013 against Gloucester Rugby, the winger has gone on to make seven first team appearances for the club.

The talented, young winger was soon noticed by the National selectors and progressed through the England age-group ranks and made his England U20 debut in 2014.

Since then the winger has gone on to make 14 appearances in an England shirt at that level, including being a part of the victorious IRB Junior World Championship that beat Australia U20s in the final in New Zealand and helping the same side get to the final of the competition the following season where they fell to New Zealand Baby Blacks.

The U20s star also earned recognition in the England Sevens side when he was called into the squad to play in the 2014 Sevens World Series in both the Glasgow and London legs of the competition.

Packman joined RFU Championship side Bedford Blues. In April 2018 he moved to Ealing Trailfinders after scoring six tries for Bedford during the 2017–18 season.

In 2019 Packman travelled to the Southern Hemisphere to play for North Otago in New Zealand. He has started in sensational form, scoring four tries in five games to take the team to the top of the Heartland Championship.

After a troubling couple of years slumming it with Tonbridge Juddians, Howard found himself back amongst the rugby elite as he signed a contract at Sevenoaks RFC to become their new Academy Head Coach.
