= Charlie Maddison =

English rugby union player

- Born: Charlie Maddison; 24 June 1991 (age 35) Newcastle upon Tyne, England
- Height: 1.88 m (6 ft 2 in)
- Weight: 109 kg (17 st 2 lb)
- University: Leeds Beckett University

Rugby union career
- Position: Hooker
- Current team: Newcastle Falcons
Amateur team(s)
| Years | Team | Apps | (Points) |
- Tynedale RFC
- Correct as of 20 October 2020
Senior career
| Years | Team | Apps | (Points) |
| 2010–2014 | Leeds Carnegie | 0 | (0) |
| 2013–2014 | Darlington Mowden Park | 0 | (0) |
| 2014–2018 | Rotherham Titans | 61 | (35) |
| 2018–2019 | Jersey Reds | 18 | (25) |
| 2019– | Newcastle Falcons | 7 | (0) |
- Correct as of 20 October 2020

Charlie Maddison (born 24 June 1991) is an English rugby union player who played for Newcastle Falcons in the Premiership Rugby.

Maddison started playing his junior rugby at Tynedale RFC. After school he moved to Leeds where he studied Sports and Exercise Science at Leeds Beckett University, where he played at the university for four years, whilst a part Leeds Carnegie academy. Maddison played for Darlington Mowden Park for a number seasons whilst also at university.

He played for Rotherham Titans who were still in the RFU Championship from 2014 to 2015 season till the end of the 2017–18 season. On 11 May 2018, Maddison left Clifton Lane to join Championship rivals Jersey Reds for the 2018–019 season.

On 27 August 2019, Maddison left Jersey as he signs for Newcastle Falcons on a two-year deal from the 2019–20 season. He made his home debut for Newcastle against Hartpury University at Kingston Park whilst still in the English Championship.
