= Harry Davies (rugby union, born 1994) =

Welsh rugby union player

- Born: Harry Davies; 10 May 1994 (age 32)
- Height: 1.94 m (6 ft 4 in)
- Weight: 108 kg (17 st 0 lb)

Rugby union career
- Position(s): Wing, Full Back
Amateur team(s)
Years	Team	Apps	(Points)
- Llantrisant RFC
Senior career
Years	Team	Apps	(Points)
2014-2016	Cardiff Blues	5	(5)
2014-2016	→Cardiff RFC	26	(47)
2016-2017	Bath	7	(0)
2018-2019	Bedford Blues		
2020-present	Seattle Seawolves		
- Correct as of 22/09/2016

Harry Davies is a Welsh professional Rugby Union player who played for Cardiff Blues, Bath rugby, and Bedford Blues, his main positions are fullback and wing. Davies is currently playing for the Seattle Seawolves, a Major League Rugby club.

== Early life ==
Davies started playing Rugby at Llantrisant RFC before becoming a part of the Cardiff Blues academy at the age of 17.

== Club Rugby ==
Whilst part of the Blues academy, Davies played on loan for Cardiff RFC. Davies also trained with the Welsh Sevens squad and represented the Blues in the World Club Sevens.

Davies made his first team debut for the Blues in November 2014, scoring a try in the LV Cup match against Newcastle Falcons.

In May 2016, it was announced that Davies had signed with Aviva Premiership side Bath for the 2016/17 season. Going on to make 7 appearances in all competitions for the club.

Davies joined English championship side Bedford Blues at the start of the 2018/19 season.

In 2020 Davies joined the MLR club Seattle Seawolves as a fullback.
