= Mike Daniels (rugby union) =

English rugby union player (born 1992)

- Born: Mike Daniels; 24 July 1992 (age 34) Reading, England
- Height: 1.88 m (6 ft 2 in)
- Weight: 117 kg (258 lb; 18 st 6 lb)
- University: Loughborough University

Rugby union career
- Position: Loosehead Prop, Tighthead Prop
Amateur team(s)
Years	Team	Apps	(Points)
2011–2014	Loughborough Students RUFC		
- Correct as of 24 June 2017
Senior career
Years	Team	Apps	(Points)
2014–2017	Worcester Warriors	32	(10)
2017-2018	Hartpury College	9	(0)
2018–2019	Nottingham	7	(10)
2019–	Newcastle Falcons	11	(10)
- Correct as of 24 June 2017

Mike Daniels (born 24 July 1992) is an English rugby union player who plays for Newcastle Falcons in the RFU Championship.

Daniels was part of Bath Rugby academy during the 2010–11 season before moving to Northcote Birkenhead Rugby Club in New Zealand for the 2011 campaign. He then studied Chemistry and Sports Science at Loughborough University whilst playing for Loughborough Students RUFC.

Daniels signed his first professional contract with Aviva Premiership outfit Worcester Warriors from the 2014–15 season. On 1 June 2017, Daniels leaves Sixways to join Gloucestershire-based club Hartpury RFC, who were promoted to the RFU Championship from the 2017–18 season.

On 3 May 2018, Daniels left Hartpury to join Championship rivals Nottingham ahead of the 2019-19 season. In summer of 2019, Daniels returns to Premiership Rugby to join Wasps from the 2019-20 season, however his move falls through after failing his medical at the Ricoh Arena.

On 11 September 2019, Daniels signs for Newcastle Falcons on a one-year contract following a successful trial with the club.
