= Will Safe =

English rugby union player

- Born: Will Safe; 11 June 1996 (age 30) Stratton, Cornwall, England
- Height: 1.91 m (6 ft 3 in)
- Weight: 102 kg (16 st 1 lb)
- School: Cheltenham Bournside School, Hartpury College

Rugby union career
- Position: Flanker/Number 8
Senior career
Years	Team	Apps	(Points)
2016-2019	Gloucester *1892*	11	(5)
2019–2021	Hartpury College	0	(0)
2021-Present	Birmingham Moseley RFC	87	(75)
International career
Years	Team	Apps	(Points)
2014–2015	England U18s		
2015–2016	England U20s		

Will Safe (born 11 June 1996) is an English rugby union player.

Safe started playing rugby at Old Patesians in Cheltenham, before joining Hartpury College in the summer of 2012, where he became a full-time member of the Gloucester Academy. He now is a physical education teacher at Pate's Grammar School, Cheltenham.

He represented England U18s, winning two AASE League titles and a FIRA Championship back in the 2014–15 season. He was also named in the England U20s for the 2015 Six Nations Under 20s Championship and for the 2015 World Rugby Under 20 Championship.

On 24 May 2018, Safe signed his first professional contract with Gloucester, thus promoted to the senior squad from the 2018–19 season.

In August 2019, following his release from Gloucester, Safe returns to Hartpury College in the RFU Championship from the 2019–20 season.
