= Jordan Onojaife =

English rugby union player

- Born: 2 August 1995 (age 31) Colchester, Essex, England
- Height: 2.00 m (6 ft 6 1/2 in)
- Weight: 121 kg (19 st 1 lb)
- School: Stowe School

Rugby union career
- Position: Lock
- Current team: Ealing Trailfinders
Senior career
Years	Team	Apps	(Points)
2013–2018	Northampton Saints	6	(0)
2015–2016	→Birmingham Moseley		
2016–2017	→Rotherham Titans	1	
2016–2018	→Bedford Blues		
2018–2019	Ealing Trailfinders	11	
2019-2024	Bedford Blues	100	
- Correct as of 6 June 2017
International career
Years	Team	Apps	(Points)
2013	England U18s	5	(0)
2014	England U20s	1	(0)
- Correct as of 6 June 2017

Jordan Onojaife (born 2 August 1995) is a professional rugby union player at Ealing Trailfinders having previously played at Northampton Saints.

After impressing at summer camps at the Midlands club, Onojaife was signed into the Saints Academy and joined Stowe School where he continued his rugby.

The lock began to feature in the Saints second team, the Wanderers, racking up game time in the Aviva 'A' League before making his senior team debut for the club in 2015 as a replacement when Saints faced Sale Sharks in the Aviva Premiership away from home.

Onojaife also received International call-ups after joining Northampton and was a part of the England U18s side that became the European Champions in 2013 alongside now Saints teammates Howard Packman and Paul Hill.

He was later called into the England U20s for the 2014 Junior World Championships in New Zealand.

Most recently Onojaife helped Saints' second team, the Northampton Wanderers, lift the Aviva 'A' League trophy as the team defeated Gloucester United in the final at Franklin's Gardens to claim the title.

On 30 March 2018, Onojaife would leave Northampton permanently to join RFU Championship side Ealing Trailfinders on a two-year deal from the 2018-19 season.
