= Rohan O'Regan =

Australian rugby union player

- Born: 19 December 1994 (age 31) Australia
- Height: 1.92 m (6 ft 3 1/2 in)
- Weight: 107 kg (16.8 st; 236 lb)

Rugby union career
- Position: Flanker
Senior career
Years	Team	Apps	(Points)
2015	Sydney Stars	8	(0)
2016–2017	NSW Country Eagles	6	(0)
2018–2019	Ealing Trailfinders	10	(0)
2022–	San Diego Legion	1	(0)
- Correct as of 19 March 2022

Rohan O'Regan (born 19 December 1994) is an Australian rugby union player, currently playing for the San Diego Legion of Major League Rugby (MLR). His preferred position is flanker.

== Professional career ==
O'Regan signed for Major League Rugby side San Diego Legion for the 2022 Major League Rugby season. He has also previously played for Sydney Stars and NSW Country Eagles, while also playing in England for Ealing Trailfinders.
