= Jared Saunders =

- Born: Jared Saunders; 18 September 1990 (age 36) Amanzimtoti, South Africa
- Height: 1.92 m (6 ft 4 in)
- Weight: 123 kg (19 st 5 lb)

Rugby union career
- Position: Hooker
Senior career
Years	Team	Apps	(Points)
2010-2017	Saracens	49	(10)
2013	→ Rotherham Titans	1	(0)
2014	→ Plymouth Albion	7	(5)
2014	→ Bedford Blues	7	(0)
2017–2018	Jersey Reds	17	(5)
2018-	London Scottish		

Jared Saunders (born 18 September 1990) is a South African professional rugby union player. He plays at hooker for London Scottish in the RFU Championship.

On 13 April 2017, Saunders left Saracens after seven seasons with the club to join Jersey Reds in the RFU Championship. Saunder's was a key part of the front row, making 17 appearances in the 2017-2018 RFU Championship Season, an integral part of the 5th-place finish for the Jersey side.

On 29 May 2018, Saunders switched Jersey for London Scottish (ahead of the 2018–2019 season).
