= Henari Veratau =

PNG international rugby union & league footballer

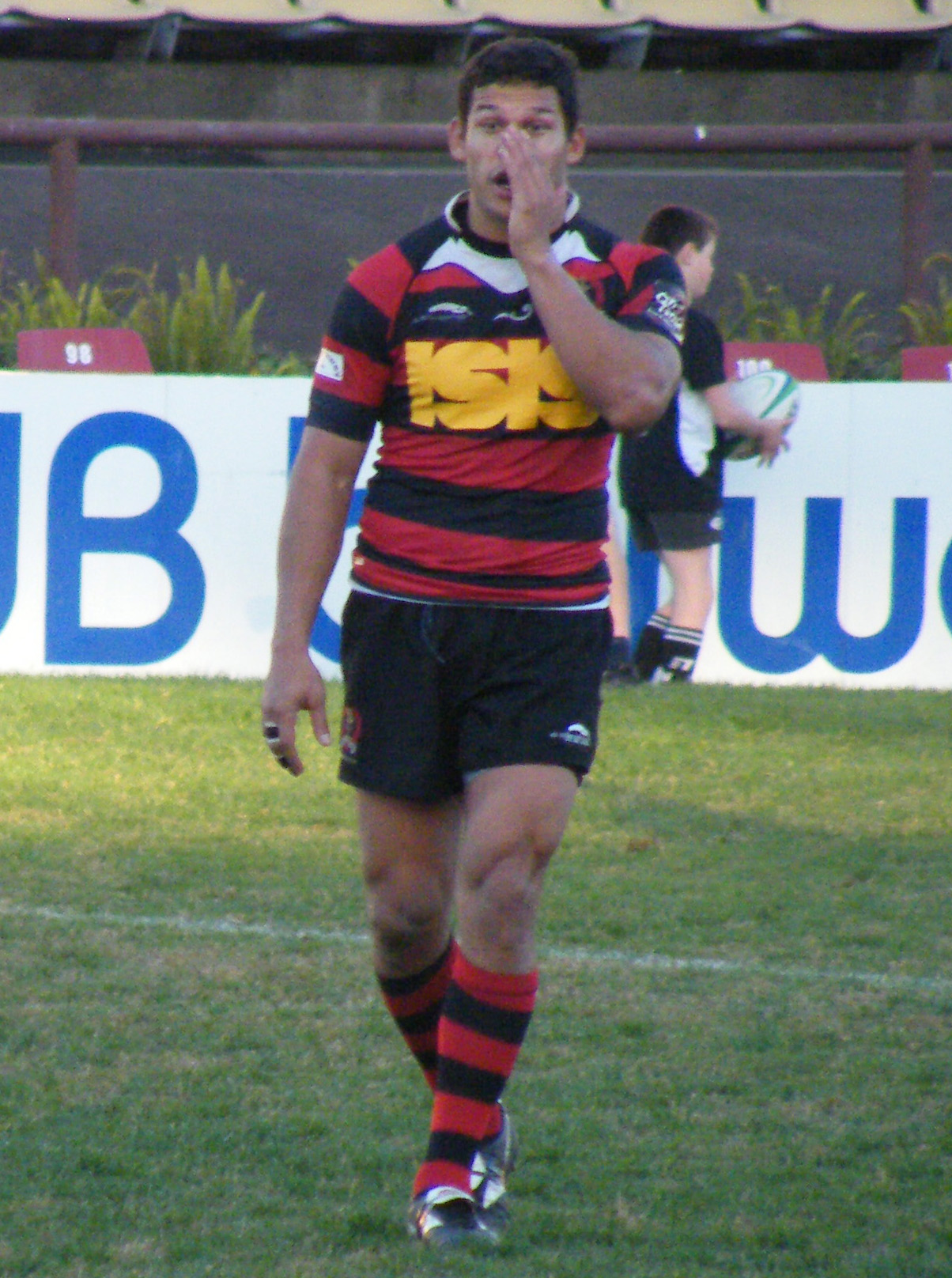

Personal information
- Born: 3 January 1984 (age 42) Port Moresby, Papua New Guinea
- Height: 183 cm (6 ft 0 in)
- Weight: 90 kg (14 st 2 lb)

Playing information
- Position: Fullback
Club
Years	Team	Pld	T	G	FG	P
2003	Sydney Roosters	2				0

Rugby union career
- Position: Wing / Centre
- Current team: Mitsubishi Sagamihara DynaBoars
Youth career
- -: Eastern Suburbs
Provincial / State sides
Years	Team	Apps	(Points)
	Sunnybank	20	(15)
Super Rugby
Years	Team	Apps	(Points)
2005	Brumbies	6	
2006	Reds	14	(15)
International career
Years	Team	Apps	(Points)
2016	Papua New Guinea		

Henari Veratau (born 3 January 1984) is a Papua New Guinean international rugby union professional footballer who played for the Queensland Reds and ACT Brumbies, who originally played rugby league for the Sydney Roosters in the National Rugby League (NRL). His position is at centre and wing. He signed for French Pro D2 club Racing Métro 92 Paris in August 2008.

== Background ==
Veratau was born in Port Moresby, Papua New Guinea.

He went to The Scots College in Sydney, winning the Honour Cap in Year 12 in 2001.

== Career ==
Veratau began his career in rugby league with the Sydney Roosters. He switched to rugby union in 2003, joining the ACT Brumbies.

In 2009, he signed with the Mitsubishi Heavy Industries Rugby Team (Mitsubishi Sagamihara DynaBoars) in Kanagawa, Japan.

He took part to the 2016 Cup of Nations with Papua New Guinea
