= Isaac Miller =

Scottish rugby union player

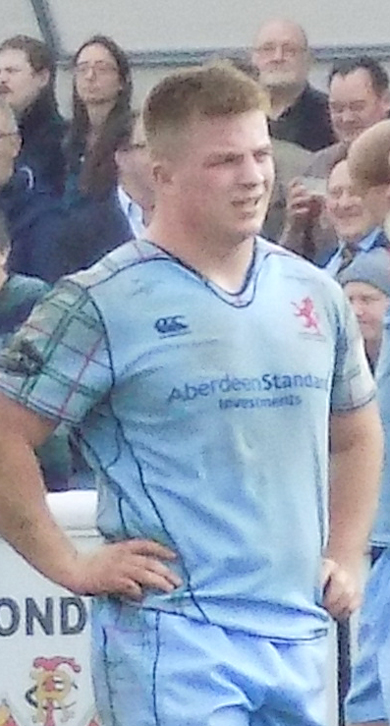
- Born: 21 June 1994 (age 32) Edinburgh, Scotland
- Height: 1.78 m (5 ft 10 in)
- Weight: 105 kg (16 st 7 lb; 231 lb)
- University: Loughborough University

Rugby union career
- Position: Hooker
- Current team: Worcester Warriors
Amateur team(s)
Years	Team	Apps	(Points)
	Edinburgh U-18	?	(?)
Senior career
Years	Team	Apps	(Points)
2017–2018	London Scottish	23	(20)
2018–2022	Worcester Warriors	48	(15)
2022–2023	London Irish	1	(5)
- Correct as of 13 December 2025
International career
Years	Team	Apps	(Points)
2014	Scotland U20	5	(0)

Isaac Miller (born 21 June 1994) is a Scottish professional rugby union player who is currently playing for London Irish in Premiership Rugby. His regular playing position is hooker.

Miller played rugby for Loughborough Students RUFC whilst studying Sports Science at Loughborough University, and has also captained the side, in their National League 1 campaign. Miller has also played for Scotland at Under-20 level and Edinburgh at U18 level.

Miller's senior career took flight after being scouted by London Scottish Director of Rugby, Dave Morris. After signing for Scottish, Miller had a successful spell playing in the RFU Championship over the 2017/2018 RFU Championship rugby season. An outstanding debut season for the young Hooker, sparked interest from Aviva Premiership side Worcester Warriors. Worcester signed Miller on 20 February 2018. Joining the club at the end of the 2017/18 RFU Championship season.
