= Tom Denton (rugby union) =

English rugby union footballer

- Born: 13 February 1988 (age 38) York, England
- Height: 1.98 m (6 ft 6 in)
- Weight: 115 kg (18 st 2 lb)

Rugby union career
- Position: Lock
Senior career
Years	Team	Apps	(Points)
2006–2012	Leeds Carnegie	60	(10)
2012–2016	Leinster	40	(10)
2016–2018	Gloucester	7	(0)
2018–	Ealing Trailfinders	6	(0)
- Correct as of 16 March 2019

Tom Denton (born 13 February 1988) is an English rugby union player for Ealing Trailfinders in the Aviva Premiership, playing as a lock. Denton represented Leeds Carnegie in the Premiership and Championship. The 6' 6" lock signed with Leeds in 2006 and played for two seasons in the academy team while the senior side was under the stewardship of former England coach Stuart Lancaster.

The former club rugby player with Malton and Norton RUFC was named Leeds' Academy Player in 2007. His debut season was in 2008/09, playing his first competitive game, as a 20-year-old, in a home win over Nottingham. The last of his 60 appearances for Leeds was in March 2011 in a match against Rotherham Titans.

Denton signed for Pro12 side Leinster in the summer of 2011 and made his debut on 1 September away to Scarlets. He is Irish qualified. His first points were scored in a match against Zebre in April 2013 in which Denton scored a try.

Denton signed for Gloucester Rugby ahead of the 2016/17 season. On 6 April 2018, Denton leaves Gloucester to join RFU Championship side Ealing Trailfinders on a two-year deal from the 2018–19 season.
