= Cameron Holenstein =

South African rugby union player

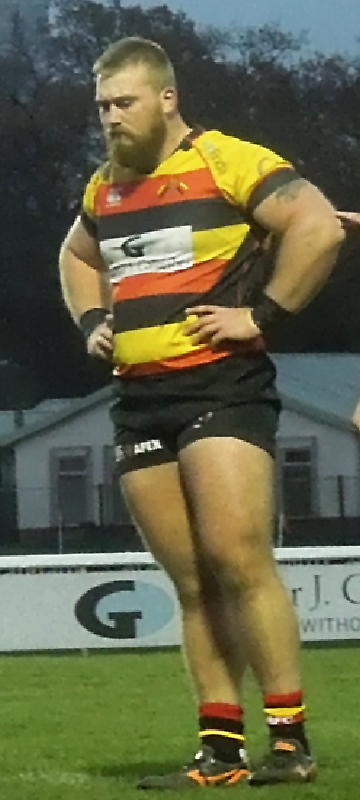
- Holenstein whilst on loan at Richmond, 2017
- Born: 11 March 1995 (age 31) Krugersdorp, South Africa
- Height: 1.88 m (6 ft 2 in)
- Weight: 134 kg (21 st 1 lb; 295 lb)
- School: Michaelhouse
- University: Hartpury University

Rugby union career
- Position: Loosehead Prop
- Current team: Hartpury University
Youth career
- 2014: Sharks U19
Amateur team(s)
| Years | Team | Apps | (Points) |
| 2015 | College Rovers | | |
Senior career
| Years | Team | Apps | (Points) |
| 2015–2016 | Pau | 1 | (0) |
| 2016–2018 | Harlequins | 1 | (0) |
| 2017 | → Richmond | 2 | (0) |
| 2018–19 | Jersey Reds | 5 | (0) |
| 2019–20 | Old Elthamians | | |
| 2020–present | Hartpury University | | |
- Correct as of 22 January 2019

Cameron Holenstein (born 11 March 1995) is a South African rugby union player, currently playing for Hartpury University in the RFU Championship. His favoured position is loosehead prop.Cameron is an international Swiss Mens XV rugby player.

Growing up in South Africa, Holenstein began his sporting career as a javelin thrower, owing to his powerful build. Holenstein’s javelin career was cut short at the age of 16 due to a career-ending shoulder injury. Being a physical and athletic young man, he turned his attention to rugby after his shoulder had recovered. His rugby career began at Pretoria Harlequins.

In 2014, he played for the Sharks U19 team, where he first met fellow Harlequin Tim Swiel. In 2015 he moved to French side Pau, where he helped the side avoid relegation from the French Top 14|url=

On the 1st of August 2016, Holenstein signed for Harlequins. Quins Director of Rugby John Kingston at the time commented; "Cameron is a tough, uncompromising, physical individual who will create real competition for places." Unfortunately, Holenstein was injured during his first appearance for Harlequins (a preseason game against London Irish). The injury sustained was a torn Achilles; it required him to be out for the whole 2016-17 season.

On 1 June 2018, Holenstein left Harlequins to join RFU Championship side Jersey Reds from the 2018-19 season.

On 5 June 2019, Holenstein left Jersey to sign for Old Elthamians who play in the English third division National League 1 for the 2019-20 season. On 4 June 2020, he returns to the RFU Championship with Hartpury University from the 2020-21 season.

2021-current Swiss Mens XV rugby team
