= Charlie Clare =

English rugby union player (born 1991)

- Born: Charles William Bernard Clare; 16 December 1991 (age 34) Norwich, England
- Height: 1.83 m (6 ft 0 in)
- Weight: 110 kg (17 st 5 lb; 243 lb)

Rugby union career
- Position: Hooker
- Current team: Leicester Tigers
Senior career
Years	Team	Apps	(Points)
2011–2013	Leicester Tigers	0	(0)
2011	→ Nottingham	4	(0)
2011–2012	→ Loughborough Students	1	(0)
2012–2013	→ Jersey	9	(5)
2013–2016	Bedford Blues	88	(15)
2016–2018	Northampton Saints	21	(5)
2018–2019	Bedford Blues	14	(25)
2019–	Leicester Tigers	150	(95)
2011–	Total	287	(145)
- Correct as of 6 September 2026

Charles William Bernard Clare (born 16 December 1991) is a professional rugby union player for Leicester Tigers in Premiership Rugby. His principal position is hooker. Previously he played for Bedford Blues in the RFU Championship, and for Northampton Saints in Premiership Rugby.

== Career ==
The hooker learned his trade at Leicester Tigers where he was a part of their academy; he also spent time out at Nottingham, Jersey Reds and Loughborough Students RUFC on loan during his five years at the Midlands side.

Following a serious shoulder injury, Clare made the move to RFU Championship side Bedford Blues in 2013. The hooker impressed at the Midlands side in their progression to the top four of the second tier of English rugby but made his departure into the Aviva Premiership in the summer of 2016. Clare has also represented RFU Championship XV in 2014.

Clare made his Premiership debut in the Saints first match of the season against Bath Rugby and made over 16 appearances for them.

Clare helped the Saints' second team the Northampton Wanderers clinch the Aviva 'A' League title as they defeated Gloucester United to lift the trophy.

He then went on to re-join Bedford Blues for the 2018–19 season, before signing for Leicester Tigers on 6 May 2019.

In 2022 Clare played in the Premiership Final as Leicester won their 11th title. Clare replaced starting hooker Julian Montoya in the 63rd minute.
