= Biyi Alo =

English rugby union player

- Born: Akinbiyi Olabamigbe Alo; 16 March 1994 (age 32) Westminster, England
- Height: 1.88 m (6 ft 2 in)
- Weight: 131 kg (289 lb; 20 st 9 lb)
- University: Loughborough University

Rugby union career
- Position: Tighthead Prop
Senior career
Years	Team	Apps	(Points)
2014–2016	Saracens	8	(0)
2015–2016	→ Bedford Blues (loan)	15	(0)
2016–2018	Worcester Warriors	30	(25)
2018–2019	Coventry	6	(0)
2019–2022	Wasps	49	(20)
2022–2023	Racing 92	7	(0)
2023-	Ealing Trailfinders	37	(10)
- Correct as of 24 October 2018
International career
Years	Team	Apps	(Points)
2012	England U18	3	(0)
2014	England U20	3	(0)
- Correct as of 4 March 2015

Biyi Alo (born 16 March 1994) is an English professional rugby union player who plays for Ealing Trailfinders in the English Championship. Alo has also released three hip-hop EPs, under the name 'Biyi'.

== Club career ==
Alo came through the academy ranks of Saracens and during this period he spent time on loan at Bedford Blues. He was a member of the Sarries side that defeated Exeter Chiefs to win the 2015 Anglo-Welsh Cup. The following year saw him leave for Worcester Warriors. After making thirty first-team appearances for Worcester a move to French club Soyaux Angouleme was agreed in 2018 however the transfer ultimately didn’t materialise and for health reasons he took a break from rugby.

Alo returned to professional rugby at Coventry who he joined in October 2018. After a short spell at the club he was scouted by Wasps and initially joined as injury cover, making his club debut against Leicester Tigers on 2 March 2019 with the deal being made permanent three days later. Alo was a second-half replacement for Jeffery Toomaga-Allen in the 2020 Premiership Final as Wasps finished runners up to Exeter.

Wasps entered administration on 17 October 2022 and Alo was made redundant along with all other players and coaching staff. After made redundant from Wasps, Alo signed for top French club Racing 92 for the rest of the 2022-23 season.

On 23 April 2023, Alo returned to England to sign for ambitious Championship side Ealing Trailfinders from the 2023-24 season.

== International career ==
Alo was a member of the England under-20 team that won the 2014 IRB Junior World Championship and was on the bench for the final against South Africa at Eden Park. In June 2022 he was called up by Eddie Jones to join a training camp with the senior England squad.
