= Mark Flanagan (rugby union) =

- Born: Mark Anthony Flanagan; 2 August 1989 (age 37) Westmeath, Ireland
- Height: 2.01 m (6 ft 7 in)
- Weight: 110 kg (17 st; 240 lb)
- School: St. Finian's College
- Notable relative: Devin Toner (cousin)

Rugby union career
- Position: Lock
Senior career
Years	Team	Apps	(Points)
2009–2013	Leinster	9	
2013–2015	Stade Montois	39	(5)
2015–2016	Bedford Blues	19	(5)
2016–2018	Saracens	11	
2017–2018	→ Munster (loan)	6	(5)
2018–2019	Bedford Blues	18	
- Correct as of 7 January 2020
International career
Years	Team	Apps	(Points)
2009	Ireland U20	8	(0)
- Correct as of 12 February 2015

Mark Flanagan (born 2 August 1989) is a retired Irish rugby union player. He played as a lock.

== Leinster ==
Flanagan made his debut for Leinster in a Pro12 game in April 2010 against Glasgow Warriors and made nine league appearances for his club.

== Stade Montois ==
Flanagan spent two successful seasons, playing for French D2 side, Stade Montois. Scoring a try in 39 appearances.

== Bedford Blues ==
In Flanagan's first spell at Bedford he achieved 19 caps and a try. Signing for Saracens at the end of just one season with the Blues.

== Saracens ==
Flanagan was a part of the 2017-2018 Aviva Premiership Saracens squad, that finished as champions. A close fought win over Exeter Chiefs in the final. Although Flanagan only featured 5 times and was not even among the subs for the final win.

== Munster ==
In September 2017, Flanagan joined Irish Pro14 side Munster on a three-month loan. He made his competitive debut for Munster on 30 September 2017, coming off the bench against Cardiff Blues in Round 5 of the 2017–18 Pro14. Flanagan made his first start for Munster on 15 October 2017, doing so in the provinces opening 2017–18 European Rugby Champions Cup fixture against Castres.
