= James Voss (rugby union) =

English rugby union player

- Born: James Voss; 22 July 1994 (age 32) London
- Height: 1.95 m (6 ft 5 in)
- Weight: 117 kg (18 st 6 lb)

Rugby union career
- Position: Lock
- Current team: Coventry
Senior career
Years	Team	Apps	(Points)
2011–2014	Jersey Reds	37	(10)
2014–2016	Hartpury College	28	(10)
2014–2016	Gloucester Rugby	15	(10)
2016–2018	Jersey Reds	22	(0)
2018–2019	Leicester Tigers	4	(0)
2019-2020	Coventry	16	(5)
2020-2024	Stade Montois	56	(15)
2011-2025;	Total	174	(50)
- Correct as of 5 April 2026

James Voss (born 22 July 1994) is an English professional rugby union player for Coventry in the RFU Championship. His usual position is lock.

== Career ==
Voss made his debut for Jersey Reds in National League 1 as a 17 year old. He played 30 times in Jersey's first two campaigns in the RFU Championship before signing with Gloucester rugby and Hartpury College R.F.C. through their International Elite Athlete Scholarship programme back in 2014. Voss also represented England Students during this period.

In 2016 Voss re-joined Jersey. On 27 March 2018 Voss joined Leicester Tigers in Premiership Rugby with immediate effect.

Voss played 4 times for Leicester and joined Championship side Coventry on a season-long loan for the 2018–19 season. Voss then made the move to Coventry permanent in April 2019, signing a two-year contract.

Following Coventry, Voss signed a multi-year contract for ProD2 side Stade Montois in France before retiring in 2024.
