= Jack O'Connell (rugby union) =

Irish rugby union player

- Born: Jack O'Connell; 1990 (age 35–36) Brussels, Belgium
- Height: 1.88 m (6 ft 2 in)
- Weight: 117 kg (18 st 6 lb; 258 lb)
- School: Clongowes Wood College
- University: Trinity College, Dublin

Rugby union career
- Position: Loosehead Prop
Amateur team(s)
Years	Team	Apps	(Points)
- Lansdowne
Senior career
Years	Team	Apps	(Points)
2011–2014	Leinster	14	(0)
2014–2018	Bristol	63	(25)
2018–2019	Ealing Trailfinders	8	(0)
- Correct as of 27 April 2019
International career
Years	Team	Apps	(Points)
2009–2010	Ireland U20	12	(0)
- Correct as of 13 June 2010

Jack O'Connell (born 1990 in Brussels, Belgium) is an Irish former rugby union player. His preferred position was loosehead prop.

Having come through the Leinster Academy, he made his senior debut in November 2012 against the Glasgow Warriors.

== Career ==
Early Career & Leinster: Leinster Academy & U20s: O'Connell was a graduate of the Leinster Academy and represented Ireland at the U20 level, winning the RBS Six Nations title during his time with the team.

Senior Debut: He made his senior debut for Leinster against the Glasgow Warriors in November 2012. Professional Rugby Bristol Rugby: After his time with Leinster, O'Connell joined Bristol Rugby in 2014, where he spent four seasons and made 67 appearances, primarily in the Championship. Ealing Trailfinders: In March 2018, he signed a one-year contract with Ealing Trailfinders, moving from Bristol for the next chapter of his career.

International Career:

Ireland U20: O'Connell featured for Ireland at the U20 level, winning twelve caps and a Six Nations title during his tenure.

Retirement: O'Connell eventually called time on his rugby career
