= Premiership Rugby Shield =

- Founded: 2003 as (Premiership Rugby A League); 2018 (as Premiership Rugby Shield)
- Country: England
- Number of clubs: 12
- Current champions: Saracens Storm (2nd title)
- Most championships: Leicester Tigers A (4 titles)
- Website: Premiership Rugby Shield
- Current: 2021–22 Premiership Rugby A League

The Premiership Rugby Shield was launched in 2003 as the Premiership Rugby A League. It runs parallel to the Premiership Rugby seasons. Split into north and south pools, it comprises twelve sides. The clubs select players from their academy and first team squads to make up their A League teams. This gives both young and experienced players the opportunity to play competitive rugby week in week out. Players from feeder clubs are allowed to play under dual registration for additional development benefit. Despite Bristol Bears having played in the Championship for several seasons since 2003. Bristol United have been included in the Shield since its inception regardless of league status.

Teams play each of the other teams in their pool both home and away. The top two teams from each pool then enter the finals stage where they will face their intra-pool opponent in the semi-final before progressing to the final against a team from the opposite pool.

== Teams (2019–20) ==
North Pool:

- Gloucester United
- Leicester Tigers A
- Northampton Wanderers
- Sale Jets
- Wasps A
- Worcester Cavaliers

South Pool:

- Bath United
- Bristol United
- Exeter Braves
- Harlequins A
- London Irish A
- Saracens Storm

== Winners ==
- 2003/04 - NEC Harlequins A beat Northampton Wanderers, 72 – 28 on aggregate (28 – 15, 44 – 13)
- 2004/05 - Leicester Tigers A beat London Wasps A, 74 – 41 on aggregate (35 – 19, 29 – 22)
- 2005/06 - Leicester Tigers A beat NEC Harlequins A, 58 – 51 on aggregate (32 – 34, 26 – 17)
- 2006/07 - London Wasps A beat Leicester Tigers A, 64 – 49 on aggregate (34 – 27, 30 – 22)
- 2007/08 - London Wasps A beat Northampton Wanderers, 59 – 39 on aggregate (34 – 3, 25 – 36)
- 2008/09 - Northampton Wanderers beat London Wasps A, 63 – 10 on aggregate (26 – 10, 37 – 0)
- 2009/10 - Leicester Tigers A beat Harlequins A, 29 – 27
- 2010/11 - Leicester Tigers A beat Sale Jets
- 2011/12 - Exeter Braves beat Harlequins A
- 2012/13 - Harlequins A beat Saracens Storm, 37 – 12
- 2013/14 - Bath United beat Northampton Wanderers, 29 – 20
- 2014/15 - Saracens Storm beat Worcester Cavaliers, 27 – 19
- 2015/16 - Exeter Braves beat Northampton Wanderers, 55 – 25
- 2016/17 - Northampton Wanderers beat Gloucester United, 36 – 15
- 2017/18 - Northampton Wanderers beat Exeter Braves, 31 – 21
- 2018/19 - Saracens Storm beat Newcastle Falcons A, 55 – 14

== See also ==
- Premiership Rugby
- Premiership Rugby Cup
- RFU Championship
- English Rugby Union teams
