= Rory Jennings (rugby union) =

English rugby union player

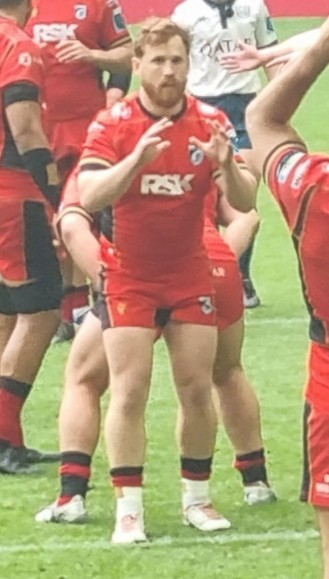
- Judgement Day 2025
- Born: Rory Jennings; 24 December 1995 (age 30) Oxford, England
- Height: 1.80 m (5 ft 11 in)
- Weight: 90 kg (14 st 2 lb)
- School: Bryanston School

Rugby union career
- Position: Fly-half
Senior career
Years	Team	Apps	(Points)
2014–2018	Bath	3	(3)
2016	→ Jersey (loan)	2	(4)
2016	→ London Scottish (loan)	1	(0)
2017–2018	→ Rotherham Titans (loan)	5	(0)
2018–2019	London Scottish	17	(105)
2019–2020	Coventry	21	(144)
2020–2021	Clermont Auvergne	5	(4)
2021–2023	London Irish	30	(36)
2023–2024	Newcastle Falcons	18	(21)
2024–2026	Cardiff	29	(0)
- Correct as of 22 June 2023
International career
Years	Team	Apps	(Points)
2013	England U18		
2015	England U20	9	(57)
- Correct as of 30 June 2015

Rory Jennings (born 24 December 1995 in Oxford, England) is an English professional rugby union footballer. He plays at fly half/centre for Welsh club Cardiff Rugby in United Rugby Championship. He previously played for English sides London Irish, Coventry and Bath and French club Clermont Auvergne
