= Ben Betts (rugby union) =

Irish rugby union player

- Born: Benjamin Betts; 28 August 1996 (age 30) [limerick, Ireland]
- Height: 1.83 m (6 ft 0 in)
- Weight: 128 kg (20.2 st; 282 lb)
- School: Tarbert Comprehensive
- University: University of Limerick

Rugby union career
- Position: Prop
Amateur team(s)
Years	Team	Apps	(Points)
20??–2016	Young Munster		
2020	Young Munster		
Senior career
Years	Team	Apps	(Points)
2016–2018	Leicester Tigers	5	(0)
2016–2017	→ Loughborough (loan)	20	(0)
2017	→ Sydney	2	(0)
2018–2020	Ealing	10	(5)
2019–2020	→ Nottingham (loan)	11	(0)
2020	Doncaster	0	(0)
2021–	Nottingham	52	(0)
2023 - 2024	Birmingham Moseley RFC	18	
- Correct as of 12 March 2022
International career
Years	Team	Apps	(Points)
2016	Ireland U20	5	(0)
- Correct as of 8 April 2018

Ben (born 28 August 1996) is an Irish rugby union player for Nottingham in the RFU Championship, the second division of English rugby union. During his rugby career, Betts, a prop, has also played for English clubs Leicester Tigers, Loughborough Students, Ealing Trailfinders, and Doncaster Knights, as well as spending time on loan in Australia with Sydney University. Internationally, Betts represented his native Ireland at under-20 level.

== Early life ==
Betts went to school at Tarbert Comprehensive school in County Kerry. He first began playing rugby for Estuary RFC in Shanagolden, County Limerick but, after a year with the club, he then moved to Young Munster. He represented Munster at youth, under-19 and under-20 level, whilst also representing Ireland at under-18 clubs, under-19 and under-20 level.

== Career ==
Betts was named in the Ireland squad for the 2016 World Rugby Under 20 Championship but, despite featuring strongly in Ireland's run to the final, he was not offered a professional contract by the IRFU or Munster. Instead, Betts moved across the Irish sea to Leicester Tigers.

Betts made his Leicester debut on 28 January 2017, coming off the bench in the 2016–17 Anglo-Welsh Cup against Northampton Saints at Welford Road. He spent the season on a dual-registration deal with Loughborough Students in National League 1, before spending a summer loan spell with Sydney University in Australia.

In April 2018, Ealing Trailfinders, who compete in the RFU Championship, announced that Betts would be joining them from the 2018–19 season. Betts joined another English side, Nottingham, on loan for the 2019–20 season, before leaving Ealing on a permanent basis to join fellow Championship side Doncaster Knights ahead of the 2020–21 season. However, Betts was released from his contract by Doncaster in July 2020 after he decided to retire from playing rugby to focus on interests outside of rugby. Despite this Betts re-joined Nottingham in March 2021 as the club assembled a squad for the COVID-19-delayed 2020–21 RFU Championship.
