= Sam Olver =

English rugby union player (born 1994)

- Born: 17 October 1994 (age 32) Peterborough, England
- Height: 1.80 m (5 ft 11 in)
- Weight: 80 kg (12 st 8 lb)
- School: Oundle School
- Notable relative(s): John Olver (father); Tom Curry (cousin); Ben Curry (cousin)

Rugby union career
- Position: Fly-Half
- Current team: Doncaster Knights
Senior career
Years	Team	Apps	(Points)
2013–2017	Northampton Saints	15	(57)
2017–2018	Worcester Warriors	40	(0)
2018–2019	Ealing Trailfinders	3	(0)
2019–	Doncaster Knights	82	(0)
- Correct as of 11 November 2024
International career
Years	Team	Apps	(Points)
2014	England U20s	4	(31)
- Correct as of 1 June 2017

Sam Olver (born 17 October 1994) is a professional rugby union player currently playing at Doncaster Knights in the RFU Championship.

He was coached at Oundle School by his father, John Olver, ex-England player.

Olver made his debut for Saints in 2013 when he came off the bench against Gloucester Rugby in the Anglo-Welsh Cup on 9 November 2013 where Olver's side won 33–6. The fly-half also scored his first points for the club during that game as he converted Alex Day's try in the 75th minute.

The fly-half made his Aviva Premiership debut the following season, coming on as a replacement in Saints' trip to Welford Road to face Leicester Tigers on 16 May 2015. Olver, however, is yet to score in the top-flight of English rugby, rather scoring all his 38 points in a Saints shirt so far in the Anglo-Welsh Cup.

Olver was also recognised with International age-group call-ups. The youngster played in four tests for the England U20s during their 2014 Six Nations Under 20s Championship. Olver scored 31 points during that competition including kicking the winning penalty as England faced Argentina on 10 June 2014.

Olver helped Saints' second team the Northampton Wanderers reach the Aviva 'A' League Final in 2016/17 season, kicking 17 points in the final as Saints beat Gloucester United to lift the trophy.

It was announced that Olver would leave current side Northampton Saints at the conclusion of the 2016/17 season and link up with fellow Aviva Premiership side Worcester Warriors after making 14 appearances in a Saints shirt. On 6 April 2018, Olver leaves Worcester to join RFU Championship side Ealing Trailfinders ahead of the 2018–19 season.

Originally on loan for Doncaster Knights, he left Ealing with immediate effect to sign a permanent two-year deal with Doncaster from the 2019–20 season.
