= List of 2025–26 Premiership Rugby transfers =

This is a list of player transfers involving Premiership Rugby teams before or during the 2025–26 season.

The list consists of deals that have been confirmed, and are for players who are moving either from or to one of the 10 rugby union clubs which competed in the Premiership during the 2024–25 season.

It is not unknown for confirmed deals to be cancelled at a later date.

== Bath ==
=== Players in ===
- (England) Dan Frost from (England) Exeter Chiefs
- (South Africa) Bernard van der Linde from (South Africa) Bulls
- (Argentina) Santiago Carreras from (England) Gloucester
- (England) Henry Arundell from (France) Racing 92
- (Scotland) Chris Harris from (England) Gloucester
- (England) Henry Mountford from (England) Leicester Tigers

=== Players out ===
- (Wales) Codi Purnell to (Wales) Dragons
- (England) Mackenzie Graham to (England) Coventry
- (England) Ruaridh McConnochie (retired)
- (England) Rory Crum (released)
- (England) Josh Dingley (released)
- (England) Archie Stanley (released)
- (England) Raff Weston (released)
- (Ireland) Niall Annett (retired)
- (England) Arthur Cordwell (retired)
- (South Africa) Luke Graham to (England) Rams
- (England) Will Parry to (England) Ealing Trailfinders
- (England) Khalik Kareem to (England) Worcester Warriors
- (England) James Short to (England) Worcester Warriors
- (England) Orlando Bailey to (England) Leicester Tigers
- (England) John Stewart to (England) Leicester Tigers
- (England) Aidan Pugh to (England) Northampton Saints
- (Wales) Ieuan Davies to (Wales) Cardiff (season-long loan)
- (Wales) Ioan Emanuel to (Wales) Cardiff (season-long loan)
- (South Africa) Louis Schreuder to (South Africa) Boland Cavaliers
- (Italy) Hame Faiva to (England) Newcastle Red Bulls
- (England) Harvey Cuckson to (Wales) Scarlets (season-long loan)
- (England) Max Pearce to (Wales) Cardiff (short-term loan)
- (South Africa) Neil le Roux to (South Africa) Bulls

== Bristol Bears ==
=== Players in ===
- (Scotland) Tom Jordan from (Scotland) Glasgow Warriors
- (Argentina) Pedro Rubiolo from (England) Newcastle Red Bulls
- (England) Max Pepper from (England) Newcastle Red Bulls
- (Wales) Josh Carrington from (Wales) Cardiff Metropolitan University
- (England) Will Ramply from (England) University of Nottingham
- (Georgia (country)) Luka Ivanishvili from (Georgia (country)) Black Lion
- (Wales) Louis Rees-Zammit from (United States) Jacksonville Jaguars (American Football)
- (Wales) Oscar Lennon from (United States) New England Free Jacks
- (Argentina) Matías Moroni from (France) Brive
- (Wales) Ellis Bevan from (Wales) Cardiff (short-term loan)
- (Wales) Mat Protheroe from (England) Hartpury University (short-term loan)
- (England) Khalik Kareem from (England) Worcester Warriors (season-long loan)
- (England) Fred Davies from (England) Doncaster Knights (short-term loan)

=== Players out ===
- (England) Max Malins to (England) Saracens
- (New Zealand) Jake Heenan to (New Zealand) Northland
- (England) Jacob Cusick (released)
- (England) Harry Rowson to (England) Dings Crusaders RFC
- (England) Yann Thomas (retired)
- (England) Andrew Turner to (England) Doncaster Knights
- (England) Aaron Tull to (England) Rams
- (England) Deago Bailey to (England) Ealing Trailfinders
- (England) Josh Caulfield to (England) Ealing Trailfinders
- (England) Sam Edwards to (England) Ealing Trailfinders
- (Fiji) Siva Naulago to (England) Worcester Warriors

== Exeter Chiefs ==
=== Players in ===
- (Australia) Tom Hooper from (Australia) ACT Brumbies
- (South Africa) Joseph Dweba from (South Africa) Stormers
- (Italy) Stephen Varney from (France) Vannes
- (Australia) Julian Heaven from (Australia) NSW Waratahs
- (Scotland) Charlie Chapman from (England) Gloucester
- (Australia) Len Ikitau from (Australia) ACT Brumbies
- (Italy) Andrea Zambonin from (Italy) Zebre Parma
- (Georgia (country)) Bachuki Tchumbadze from (Georgia (country)) Black Lion
- (England) Marlon Farouk-Roy from (England) Saracens
- (South Africa) Khwezi Mona from (South Africa) Sharks
- (England) Harry Ascherl from (Australia) Sydney University

=== Players out ===
- (England) Dan Frost to (England) Bath
- (England) Marcus Street to (England) Saracens
- (Wales) Joe Hawkins to (Wales) Scarlets
- (England) Jack Innard to (England) Gloucester
- (South Africa) Jacques Vermeulen to (England) Sale Sharks
- (England) Chester Ribbons to (England) Cornish Pirates
- (England) Sam Maunder to (England) Coventry
- (England) Lucas Dorrell to (France) Bourgoin-Jallieu
- (England) Charlie McCaig to (Scotland) Edinburgh
- (England) Stu Townsend to (England) Harlequins
- (England) Billy Keast to (England) Worcester Warriors
- (Argentina) Franco Molina to (Australia) Western Force
- (Ireland) Niall Armstrong to (Wales) Dragons
- (England) Hallam Chapman to (England) Worcester Warriors
- (England) Will Rigg to (Wales) Cardiff (short-term loan)
- (Ireland) Jack Dunne to (Japan) Toyota Industries Shuttles
- (Wales) Orson James to (England) Cornish Pirates (season-long loan)
- (England) Zack Wimbush to (England) Cornish Pirates (season-long loan)

== Gloucester ==
=== Players in ===
- (England) Will Joseph from (England) Harlequins
- (Ireland) Ross Byrne from (Ireland) Leinster
- (England) Ben Loader from (South Africa) Stormers
- (South Africa) James Venter from (South Africa) Sharks
- (England) Jack Innard from (England) Exeter Chiefs
- (England) Ben Redshaw from (England) Newcastle Red Bulls
- (Scotland) Jack Mann from (Scotland) Glasgow Warriors
- (England) Will Trenholm from (England) Harlequins
- (England) Mike Austin from (England) Hartpury University
- (England) Josh Basham from (Japan) Shimizu Koto Blue Sharks
- (Australia) Hugh Bokenham from (England) Cornish Pirates
- (Ireland) Rob Russell from (Ireland) Leinster
- (New Zealand) Nepo Laulala from (France) Toulouse
- (Spain) Jono Benz-Salomon from (England) Hartpury University
- (England) Danny Eite (promoted from Academy)
- (England) Afolabi Fasogbon (promoted from Academy)
- (Wales) Josh Hathaway (promoted from Academy)
- (England) Archie McArthur (promoted from Academy)
- (South Africa) Dian Bleuler from (South Africa) Sharks
- (Wales) Harrison James from (Wales) Cardiff University (short-term loan)
- (New Zealand) Manaaki Boyle-Tiatia from (New Zealand) Waikato (short-term deal)
- (Italy) Callum Braley (unattached) (short-term deal)

=== Players out ===
- (Argentina) Santiago Carreras to (England) Bath
- (Scotland) Charlie Chapman to (England) Exeter Chiefs
- (England) Christian Wade to (England) Wigan Warriors (Rugby League)
- (Wales) Gareth Anscombe to (France) Bayonne
- (South Africa) Gareth Blackmore (released)
- (Wales) Morgan Nelson to (England) Cornish Pirates
- (England) Morgan Adderly-Jones to (England) Coventry
- (Spain) Aristot Benz-Salomon to (England) Coventry
- (England) Ioan Jones to (Wales) Scarlets
- (England) Alfie Petch to (England) Cornish Pirates
- (England) Matty Ward to (England) Cornish Pirates
- (Scotland) Chris Harris to (England) Bath
- (England) Rory Taylor to (England) Worcester Warriors
- (South Africa) Ruan Ackermann to (South Africa) Stormers
- (Fiji) Albert Tuisue to (France) Provence
- (England) Louis Hillman-Cooper to (France) Rennes
- (England) Zach Mercer to (France) Toulon
- (Argentina) Mayco Vivas to (France) Oyonnax
- (England) Freddie Clarke to (England) Newcastle Red Bulls

== Harlequins ==
=== Players in ===
- (Ireland) Kieran Treadwell from (Ireland) Ulster
- (Argentina) Guido Petti from (France) Bordeaux
- (England) Harry Williams from (France) Pau
- (Scotland) George Turner from (Japan) Kobelco Kobe Steelers
- (England) Stu Townsend from (England) Exeter Chiefs
- (England) Max Green from (France) Périgueux
- (Argentina) Boris Wenger from (Argentina) Dogos
- (Argentina) Pedro Delgado from (Argentina) Dogos
- (Ireland) Cameron Doak from (Ireland) Ulster (short-term loan)
- (England) Alex Everett from (England) Cornish Pirates (short-term loan)
- (England) Sean Kerr (promoted from Academy)
- (Australia) Jack Grant from (Australia) NSW Waratahs
- (Ireland) Alessandro Heaney from (United States) RFC Los Angeles (short-term deal)
- (Wales) Joe Jones from (England) Doncaster Knights (short-term deal)
- (England) Andrew Turner from (England) Doncaster Knights (short-term deal)
- (Wales) Luke Yendle from (Wales) Dragons (short-term deal)

=== Players out ===
- (England) Nathan Jibulu to (England) Sale Sharks
- (England) Will Joseph to (England) Gloucester
- (Wales) Dillon Lewis to (Wales) Dragons
- (South Africa) Irné Herbst to (France) Brive
- (England) Will Trenholm to (England) Gloucester
- (England) Danny Care (retired)
- (Wales) Wyn Jones to (Wales) Dragons
- (England) Caleb Ashworth (released)
- (Scotland) Charlie Claire (released)
- (England) Roma Zheng to (England) Worcester Warriors
- (Italy) Dino Lamb to (Japan) Yokohama Canon Eagles
- (England) Lennox Anyanwu to (France) Montpellier
- (England) George Head to (England) Dorking
- (England) George Hammond to (Japan) Tokyo Sungoliath
- (New Zealand) Lewis Gjaltema to (England) Tonbridge Juddians
- (England) Archie White to (England) Tonbridge Juddians
- (Wales) Tom Golder to (England) Worcester Warriors
- (Wales) Leigh Halfpenny to (Wales) Cardiff

== Leicester Tigers ==
=== Players in ===
- (England) Jamie Blamire from (England) Newcastle Red Bulls
- (England) Tarek Haffar from (England) Northampton Saints
- (England) Wilf McCarthy from (England) Hartpury University
- (Argentina) Joaquin Moro from (Argentina) Pampas XV
- (England) Charlie Titcombe from (Wales) Scarlets
- (England) Ollie Allan (promoted from Academy)
- (England) Lewis Chessum (promoted from Academy)
- (England) Archie van der Flier (promoted from Academy)
- (England) Josh Manz (promoted from Academy)
- (England) Cameron Miell (promoted from Academy)
- (England) Orlando Bailey from (England) Bath
- (England) Gabriel Hamer-Webb from (Wales) Cardiff
- (Australia) James O'Connor from (New Zealand) Crusaders
- (England) Billy Searle from (France) Agen
- (England) John Stewart from (England) Bath
- (New Zealand) James Thompson from (New Zealand) Chiefs
- (United States) Tonga Kofe from (United States) Utah Warriors
- (Wales) Ryan Crowley from (England) Chinnor
- (Scotland) Hamish Watson from (Scotland) Edinburgh (short-term loan)

=== Players out ===
- (England) Dan Kelly to (Ireland) Munster
- (South Africa) Handré Pollard to (South Africa) Bulls
- (Wales) Harry Beddall to (Wales) Dragons
- (England) Ben Youngs (retired)
- (England) James Whitcombe to (Scotland) Edinburgh
- (England) Malelili Satala to (Scotland) Edinburgh
- (England) Josh Bassett to (England) Worcester Warriors
- (Ireland) James Cronin to (Ireland) Highfield
- (England) Mike Brown (retired)
- (England) Jamie Shillcock to (France) Brive
- (England) Harry Clarke (released)
- (Fiji) Tim Hoyt to (England) Worcester Warriors
- (England) Dan Cole (retired)
- (England) Archie Vanes to (England) Worcester Warriors
- (France) Côme Joussain to (England) Worcester Warriors
- (Wales) Osian Thomas to (England) Nottingham
- (South Africa) Kyle Hatherell to (England) Ealing Trailfinders
- (England) Matt Rogerson to (England) Worcester Warriors
- (Argentina) Julian Montoya to (France) Pau
- (England) Charlie Davies to (England) Nottingham
- (England) Jack Vernum to (England) Cambridge
- (England) Henry Mountford to (England) Bath
- (Fiji) Ben Volavola to (Australia) Queensland Reds
- (United States) Tonga Kofe to (United States) California Legion

== Newcastle Red Bulls ==
=== Players in ===
- (England) Ethan Grayson from (United States) San Diego Legion
- (England) Connor Doherty from (England) Sale Sharks
- (England) George McGuigan from (Wales) Ospreys
- (Scotland) Jamie Hodgson from (Scotland) Edinburgh
- (England) Freddie Clarke from (England) Gloucester
- (Japan) Amanaki Mafi from (Japan) Yokohama Canon Eagles
- (Argentina) Simón Benítez Cruz from (Argentina) Tarucas
- (New Zealand) Tom Christie from (New Zealand) Crusaders
- (Australia) Fergus Lee-Warner from (Australia) NSW Waratahs
- (South Africa) Boeta Chamberlain from (South Africa) Bulls
- (Italy) Hame Faiva from (England) Bath
- (England) Christian Wade from (England) Wigan Warriors (Rugby League)
- (England) Joel Grayson from (England) Old Northamptonians
- (England) Harrison Obatoyinbo from (France) Mont-de-Marsan
- (England) Sam Waugh from (England) Loughborough Students|
- (South Africa) Stefan Coetzee from (South Africa) Pumas
- (Wales) Liam Williams from (England) Saracens
- (Scotland) Cammy Hutchison from (England) Saracens
- (Ireland) Stewart Moore from (Ireland) Ulster (short-term loan)
- (England) Samson Adejimi from (England) Saracens (season-long loan)
- (New Zealand) Bryn Gordon from (New Zealand) North Harbour
- (Australia) Jamie Clark from (Ireland) Old Wesley

=== Players out ===
- (Argentina) Pedro Rubiolo to (England) Bristol Bears
- (England) Max Pepper to (England) Bristol Bears
- (England) Ben Redshaw to (England) Gloucester
- (England) Callum Chick to (England) Northampton Saints
- (England) Jamie Blamire to (England) Leicester Tigers
- (England) Josh Bainbridge to (England) Doncaster Knights
- (England) Louis Brown to (England) Worcester Warriors
- (England) Oscar Stott to (England) Nottingham
- (England) Ben Stevenson to (France) Vannes
- (England) Jack Metcalf to (France) Rouen
- (England) Kieran Wilkinson to (England) Caldy
- (Scotland) Kiran McDonald to (Japan) Hanazono Kintetsu Liners
- (Scotland) Cammy Hutchison to (England) Saracens
- (England) Patrick Hogg to (England) Sale Sharks
- (Italy) Hame Faiva (retired)
- (Wales) Liam Williams (retired)

== Northampton Saints ==
=== Players in ===
- (Zimbabwe) Cleopas Kundiona from (France) Nevers
- (Scotland) Amena Caqusau from (Scotland) Glasgow Warriors
- (Italy) Danilo Fischetti from (Italy) Zebre Parma
- (England) Callum Chick from (England) Newcastle Red Bulls
- (France) Anthony Belleau from (France) Clermont
- (South Africa) JJ van der Mescht from (France) Stade Français
- (England) James Martin from (England) Coventry
- (England) Aidan Pugh from (England) Bath
- (Italy) Marco Manfredi from (Italy) Benetton

=== Players out ===
- (South Africa) Juarno Augustus to (Ireland) Ulster
- (Scotland) Reuben Logan to (England) Sale Sharks
- (Fiji) Temo Mayanavanua to (Fiji) Fijian Drua
- (England) Tarek Haffar to (England) Leicester Tigers
- (Australia) Charlie Savala to (Scotland) Glasgow Warriors
- (England) Ewan Baker to (England) Coventry
- (England) Tom Dye (released)
- (England) Louis Haley (released)
- (England) Henry Nanka-Bruce (released)
- (England) Kieran Perkins (released)
- (England) Beltus Nonleh to (England) Sedgley Park
- (England) Jake Garside to (England) Worcester Warriors
- (England) Toby Cousins to (England) Ealing Trailfinders
- (England) Tom Seabrook to (England) Worcester Warriors
- (Samoa) Iakopo Mapu to (France) Stade Français
- (Scotland) Callum Hunter-Hill to (Scotland) Edinburgh
- (England) George Makepeace-Cubitt (released)
- (England) Rafe Witheat to (England) Bedford Blues
- (England) Nathan Langdon to (England) Sale FC
- (South Africa) Burger Odendaal to (Japan) Hanazono Kintetsu Liners
- (Australia) Angus Scott-Young to (Australia) NSW Waratahs

== Sale Sharks ==
=== Players in ===
- (England) Nathan Jibulu from (England) Harlequins
- (South Africa) Marius Louw from (South Africa) Lions
- (South Africa) Jacques Vermeulen from (England) Exeter Chiefs
- (Scotland) Reuben Logan from (England) Northampton Saints
- (England) Patrick Hogg from (England) Newcastle Red Bulls
- (Wales) Regan Grace from (Wales) Cardiff (short-term deal)
- (South Africa) Gurshwin Wehr from (South Africa) Griquas (short-term loan)

=== Players out ===
- (England) Josh Beaumont (retired)
- (England) Tommy Taylor (retired)
- (England) Ross Harrison (released)
- (England) Harry Thompson to (England) Ealing Trailfinders
- (Ireland) Cian Jackson to (England) Caldy
- (South Africa) Jean-Luc du Preez to (France) Bordeaux
- (England) Jonny Hill to (France) Racing 92
- (Ireland) Will Addison to (England) Sale FC
- (England) Connor Doherty to (England) Newcastle Red Bulls
- (Wales) Osian Roberts to (Wales) Cardiff (short-term loan)

== Saracens ==
=== Players in ===
- (England) Max Malins from (England) Bristol Bears
- (England) Marcus Street from (England) Exeter Chiefs
- (Fiji) Vilikesa Nairau from (England) Coventry
- (Samoa) Tietie Tuimauga from (France) Montauban
- (England) Owen Farrell from (France) Racing 92
- (Scotland) Cammy Hutchison from (England) Newcastle Red Bulls (short-term loan)
- (Samoa) Totoa Auva'a from (Samoa) Lauli'i Lions

=== Players out ===
- (Wales) James Talamai to (Wales) Dragons
- (Australia) Ollie Hoskins (retired)
- (England) Sam Crean to (Ireland) Ulster
- (England) Tiff Eden to (England) Worcester Warriors
- (England) Fraser Balmain to (England) Worcester Warriors
- (England) Josh Hallett (released)
- (England) Alex Goode (retired)
- (England) Finn Bloomer (released)
- (New Zealand) Declan Murphy to (England) Salford Red Devils (Rugby League)
- (England) Marlon Farouk-Roy to (England) Exeter Chiefs
- (Wales) Liam Williams to (England) Newcastle Red Bulls
- (Scotland) Cammy Hutchison to (England) Newcastle Red Bulls
- (England) Samson Adejimi to (England) Newcastle Red Bulls (season-long loan)

== See also ==
- List of 2025–26 United Rugby Championship transfers
- List of 2025–26 Champ Rugby transfers
- List of 2025–26 Super Rugby transfers
- List of 2025–26 Top 14 transfers
- List of 2025–26 Rugby Pro D2 transfers
- List of 2025–26 Major League Rugby transfers
