= List of 2025–26 Champ Rugby transfers =

This is a list of player transfers involving Champ Rugby teams before or during the 2025–26 season. The list is of deals that are confirmed and are either from or to a rugby union team in the Championship during the 2025–26 season. It is not unknown for confirmed deals to be cancelled at a later date.

No clubs were promoted to the Gallagher Premiership for the 2024–25 season. No clubs were relegated for the 2024–25 season. On 7 April 2025, Richmond won National League 1 for the 2024-25 season, therefore promoted to the Champ Rugby for the 2025-26 season. After a period in administration, Worcester Warriors will return to professional competition in the Champ Rugby for the 2025-26 season.

== Ampthill ==
=== Players in ===
- (England) Alex Davies from (England) Leeds Beckett University
- (England) Louis Grimoldby from (England) Cambridge
- (England) Ollie Mullarkey from (England) Leeds Beckett University
- (England) Jevaughn Warren from (England) Coventry
- (England) Matt Salisbury from (England) Leeds Beckett University
- (Scotland) Callum Norrie from (Scotland) Glasgow Warriors
- (England) Richard Barrington from (France) Agen
- (England) Sebastian Smith from (England) Loughborough Students RUFC
- (England) Harrison Daken from (England) Worthing Raiders
- (Wales) Efan Jones from (Wales) Scarlets
- (Tonga) Justin Mataele from (New Zealand) Moana Pasifika
- (England) Sam Kildunne from (England) Loughborough Students RUFC
- (England) Joe Heslop from (England) Old Northamptonians

=== Players out ===
- (Fiji) Vereimi Qorowale to (England) Cambridge
- (Wales) Arthur Thomas to (England) Cambridge
- (Scotland) Karl Main to (England) Chinnor
- (Ireland) Luke Thompson to (England) Chinnor
- (England) Evan Mitchell to (England) Nottingham
- (Wales) Harri Williams to (Wales) Ospreys

== Bedford Blues ==
=== Players in ===
- (England) Ryan Hutler from (England) Coventry
- (England) Kayde Sylvester from (England) Cambridge
- (Fiji) Tui Uru from (France) Chambéry
- (Wales) Ilan Evans from (Wales) RGC 1404
- (England) Tom Price from (Italy) Biella
- (England) George Worth from (France) Valence Romans
- (England) Archie Hosking from (England) Rosslyn Park
- (England) Rafe Witheat from (England) Northampton Saints
- (England) Monty Royston from (Australia) Bond University
- (England) Nicholas Finch from (France) Limoges
- (England) Joe Hill from (Wales) Swansea University

=== Players out ===
- (Fiji) Joel Matavesi to (France) Bourg-en-Bresse
- (Wales) Jac Arthur (retired)
- (England) Jamie Elliott (retired)
- (England) Joe Howard (released)
- (England) Pat Tapley (retired)
- (England) Alfie Garside to (England) Worcester Warriors
- (England) Austin Hay to (England) London Scottish
- (England) Luke Frost to (England) Richmond
- (Hong Kong) Matt Worley to (Hong Kong) HKFC
- (England) Cameron King to (England) Rosslyn Park

== Caldy ==
=== Players in ===
- (Wales) Rhys Tudor from (Wales) RGC 1404
- (England) Tom Akehurst from (England) Wirral
- (Poland) Max Loboda from (Scotland) Boroughmuir Bears
- (England) Drew Davison from (England) British Army
- (Ireland) Cian Jackson from (England) Sale Sharks
- (Germany) Michael McDonald from (England) British Army
- (Ireland) Adam McNamee from (Ireland) Malone
- (Wales) Dan Owen from (Wales) RGC 1404
- (England) Kieran Wilkinson from (England) Newcastle Red Bulls

=== Players out ===
- (England) Freddie Stevenson to (England) Plymouth Albion
- (England) Adam Aigbokhae (retired)
- (England) Sam Dickinson (retired)
- (England) Nick Royle (retired)
- (England) Sam Rogers to (England) Chester
- (England) Luke Cox to (England) Sedgley Tigers
- (England) Jacob Tansey to (England) Sedgley Tigers

== Cambridge ==
=== Players in ===
- (Samoa) Sam Asotasi (unattached)
- (South Africa) Rhys Fulford from (South Africa) Hamilton Sea Point
- (England) Dan Eckersley from (England) Loughborough Students RUFC
- (New Zealand) Levi Reweti from (Scotland) Glasgow Hawks
- (England) Jamie Annand from (England) Nottingham
- (New Zealand) Dylan Irvine from (England) Cornish Pirates
- (Fiji) Vereimi Qorowale from (England) Ampthill
- (Wales) Arthur Thomas from (England) Ampthill
- (England) Chris Mills from (England) Cornish Pirates
- (England) Joe Pluckett from (England) Loughborough Students RUFC
- (South Africa) Ben Currie from (England) Ealing Trailfinders
- (New Zealand) Sam Johnson from (England) Bishop's Stortford
- (England) Ardal Yallop from (Wales) Cardiff Metropolitan University
- (Ireland) Jake McCay from (Spain) Les Abelles
- (England) Jasper Sorrell from (England) Ealing Trailfinders
- (England) Ethan Thorne from (France) Oyonnax
- (England) Jack Doorey-Palmer from (England) Harlequins (season-long loan)
- (Samoa) Paul Masoe from (Samoa) Marist St. Joseph
- (Tonga) Otumaka Mausia from (New Zealand) Moana Pasifika
- (Ireland) Jack Boal from (Australia) Sydney University
- (England) Jack Vernum from (England) Leicester Tigers
- (Fiji) Eparama Rokodrava from (England) Ealing Trailfinders

=== Players out ===
- (England) Ollie Betteridge (released)
- (England) George Bretag-Norris (retired)
- (England) Matt Dawson (released)
- (England) Matty Jones (released)
- (Wales) Arthur Lennon (retired)
- (England) Joe Tarrant (released)
- (England) Louis Grimoldby to (England) Ampthill
- (England) Kayde Sylvester to (England) Bedford Blues
- (England) Ben Brownlie to (England) Nottingham
- (England) Sam Hanks to (England) Chinnor
- (England) Matt Hema to (England) Bury St Edmunds
- (Wales) Iestyn Rees to (England) Nottingham
- (Wales) Tom Hoppe to (England) Bury St Edmunds
- (England) Ashton Webb to (England) Oundle
- (England) Seb Brownhill to (England) Richmond
- (England) Jared Cardew to (England) Richmond
- (England) Morgan Veness to (England) Rotherham Titans
- (England) Josh Skelcey to (England) Old Albanian
- (Hong Kong) Jack Bartlett to (Hong Kong) HKFC
- (England) Ed Timpson to (United States) California Legion

== Chinnor ==
=== Players in ===
- (Scotland) Freddie Owsley from (Scotland) Watsonian
- (Georgia (country)) Ramaz Rukadze from (England) Plymouth Albion
- (England) Sam Hanks from (England) Cambridge
- (England) Joe Brock from (England) Leicester Lions
- (Scotland) Jamie Campbell from (Scotland) Heriot's
- (Scotland) Karl Main from (England) Ampthill
- (England) Kai Owen from (England) Nottingham
- (Ireland) Luke Thompson from (England) Ampthill
- (Ireland) Alex Pybus from (Ireland) Belfast Harlequins

=== Players out ===
- (England) Keston Lines to (England) Coventry
- (Australia) Will Feeney to (England) Ealing Trailfinders
- (Wales) Ryan Crowley to (England) Leicester Tigers

== Cornish Pirates ==
=== Players in ===
- (England) Matt Pritchard from (England) Redruth
- Ben Cambriani from Wales Sevens
- (Wales) Morgan Nelson from (England) Gloucester
- (England) Chester Ribbons from (England) Exeter Chiefs
- (Australia) Rory Suttor from (Ireland) Lansdowne
- (England) Alfie Petch from (England) Gloucester
- (England) Matty Ward from (England) Gloucester
- (England) Ben Woodmansey from (England) Helston
- (Wales) Arwel Robson from (France) Chambéry
- (Australia) Angus Mawson from (Australia) Warringah
- (Australia) Luke Ratcliff from (Portugal) Coimbra
- (Ireland) Alessandro Heaney from (United States) RFC Los Angeles (short-term deal)
- (Wales) Orson James from (England) Exeter Chiefs (season-long loan)
- (England) Zack Wimbush from (England) Exeter Chiefs (season-long loan)

=== Players out ===
- (England) Will Gibson to (Australia) Sydney University
- (Ireland) Bruce Houston to (France) Bourg-en-Bresse
- (Australia) Hugh Bokenham to (England) Gloucester
- (New Zealand) Dylan Irvine to (England) Cambridge
- (England) Chris Mills to (England) Cambridge
- (England) Will Trewin to (England) Worcester Warriors
- (Zimbabwe) Matt McNab to (England) Doncaster Knights
- (Ireland) Fintan Coleman (retired)
- (England) Tom Georgiou (retired)
- (Scotland) Cameron Jones (retired)
- (Ireland) Oisin Mitchel (retired)
- (England) Jay Tyack (retired)
- (England) Robin Wedlake to (England) Camborne
- (England) Michael Etete to (England) Nottingham
- (England) Harry Hocking to (England) Richmond

== Coventry ==
=== Players in ===
- (England) Morgan Adderly-Jones from (England) Gloucester
- (England) Tom Bacon from (Australia) Northern Suburbs
- (England) Ewan Baker from (England) Northampton Saints
- (Spain) Aristot Benz-Salomon from (England) Gloucester
- (England) Murray Davidson from (England) Hinckley
- (England) Mackenzie Graham from (England) Bath
- (England) Keston Lines from (England) Chinnor
- (England) Jake Shine from (England) Nottingham
- (Wales) Morgan Strong from (England) Doncaster Knights
- (Wales) Josh Thomas from (Wales) Dragons
- (England) Sam Maunder from (England) Exeter Chiefs
- Api Bavadra from England Sevens
- (England) Onisivoro Nayagi from (England) British Army
- (Ireland) Peter Sullivan from (Ireland) Lansdowne
- (England) Dylan Morris from (England) British Army
- (Scotland) Allan Ferrie from (Scotland) Southern Districts
- Jack Reeves from (United States) New England Free Jacks

=== Players out ===
- (England) Matt Kvesic to (England) Worcester Warriors
- (Fiji) Vilikesa Nairau to (England) Saracens
- (England) Ryan Hutler to (England) Bedford Blues
- (Scotland) James Tyas to (England) Worcester Warriors
- (England) Will Lane to (England) Worcester Warriors
- (England) Will Biggs to (England) Worcester Warriors
- (Australia) Liam Richman to (Italy) Petrarca
- (England) Obinna Nkwocha to (England) Worcester Warriors
- (England) James Martin to (England) Northampton Saints
- (Wales) Steff Davies to (Wales) Cardiff
- (Wales) Rhys Anstey to (Wales) Ebbw Vale
- (England) Theo Mannion to (England) Leicester Lions
- (England) Fin Ogden to (England) Leicester Lions
- (England) Charlie Robson to (England) London Broncos (Rugby League)
- (Ireland) Daniel Okeke to (Spain) Getxo
- (England) Jevaughn Warren to (England) Ampthill
- (England) Tom Hitchcock to (England) Bishop's Stortford

== Doncaster Knights ==
=== Players in ===
- (England) Ryan Olowofela from (England) Nottingham
- (England) Josh Bainbridge from (England) Newcastle Red Bulls
- (England) Ehize Ehizode from (England) Ealing Trailfinders
- (Zimbabwe) Matt McNab from (England) Cornish Pirates
- (Scotland) Aidan Cross from (Scotland) Glasgow Warriors
- (England) Andrew Turner from (England) Bristol Bears
- (England) Joe Margetts from (France) Bourg-en-Bresse
- (Wales) Morgan Jones from (Wales) Scarlets
- (Samoa) ET Viliamu from (Spain) Valladolid
- (Fiji) Cameron Nordli-Kelemeti from (United States) New England Free Jacks
- (Canada) Cole Keith from (United States) New England Free Jacks

=== Players out ===
- (England) Maliq Holden (retired)
- (England) Cory Teague to (England) Rotherham Titans
- (Wales) Morgan Strong to (England) Coventry
- (England) Harry Davey to (England) Sale FC
- (Scotland) Archie Smeaton to (England) Blackheath
- (England) Will Metcalfe to (England) Rotherham Titans
- (Fiji) Taniela Ramasibana to (Italy) Vicenza
- (Wales) George Roberts to (Wales) Dragons
- (Wales) Joe Jones to (England) Sale Sharks

== Ealing Trailfinders ==
=== Players in ===
- (England) Will Parry from (England) Bath
- (Ireland) Patrick Campbell from (Ireland) Munster
- (New Zealand) Jamie Carr from (New Zealand) Canterbury
- (England) Gabriel Mann from (England) University of Bristol
- (Australia) Will Feeney from (England) Chinnor
- (England) Deago Bailey from (England) Bristol Bears
- (England) Josh Caulfield to (England) Bristol Bears
- (England) Sam Edwards to (England) Bristol Bears
- (England) Toby Cousins from (England) Northampton Saints
- (Ireland) Scott Buckley from (Ireland) Munster
- (South Africa) Kyle Hatherell from (England) Leicester Tigers
- (Scotland) Richie Simpson from (Scotland) Glasgow Warriors
- (England) Harry Thompson from (England) Sale Sharks
- (Ireland) Conor Oliver from (Ireland) Connacht
- (Ireland) Rory Scannell from (Ireland) Munster
- (New Zealand) Brodie Robinson from (New Zealand) Tasman
- (New Zealand) Harry Taylor from (New Zealand) Otago
- (New Zealand) PJ Sheck from (New Zealand) Blues

=== Players out ===
- (Wales) Lloyd Williams to (England) Worcester Warriors
- (England) Max Bodilly (retired)
- (England) Nathan Earle (retired)
- (England) Ehize Ehizode to (England) Doncaster Knights
- (England) Craig Willis to (France) Agen
- (England) Ben Harris (retired)
- (South Africa) Ben Currie to (England) Cambridge
- (England) Jasper Sorrell to (England) Cambridge
- (Fiji) Eparama Rokodrava to (England) Cambridge
- (England) Sam Clark to (England) Darlington Mowden Park
- (England) Simon Uzokwe to (England) Darlington Mowden Park
- (South Africa) Rayn Smid (retired)
- (England) Ollie Newman (retired)

== Hartpury University ==
=== Players in ===
- (England) Dan Owen from (England) Nottingham Trent University
- (England) Ollie Allsopp from (England) Birmingham Moseley
- (England) Harry Edwards from (England) Cinderford

=== Players out ===
- (England) Wilf McCarthy to (England) Leicester Tigers
- (England) Mike Austin to (England) Gloucester
- (Spain) Jono Benz-Salomon to (England) Gloucester
- (England) Tom Hamble to (England) Richmond

== London Scottish ==
=== Players in ===
- (England) Osman Dimen from (France) Chambéry
- (England) Harry Clayton from (England) Nottingham
- (England) Austin Hay from (England) Bedford Blues
- (New Zealand) Jack Leslie from (New Zealand) Otago
- (England) Matt Gribbon from (England) Leeds Beckett University
- (England) Fraser Honey from (England) Rams
- (England) Murray Bellis from (England) Henley Hawks
- (England) Jack Wright from (England) Royal Navy
- (England) Declan Johnson from (England) Royal Navy
- (Fiji) Solodrau Radianirova from (England) Rams
- (England) Tam Lindsay from (England) Havant
- (South Africa) Vaughan Bentley from (England) Richmond

=== Players out ===
- (England) Ashley Challenger to (England) Worcester Warriors
- (England) Austin Wallis to (England) Worcester Warriors

== Nottingham ==
=== Players in ===
- (England) Ben Brownlie from (England) Cambridge
- (England) Mink Scharink from (England) Loughborough Students RUFC
- (England) Oscar Stott from (England) Newcastle Red Bulls
- (England) Evan Mitchell from (England) Ampthill
- (Wales) Osian Thomas from (England) Leicester Tigers
- (England) Michael Etete from (England) Bedford Blues
- (Wales) Iestyn Rees from (England) Cambridge
- (England) Charlie Davies from (England) Leicester Tigers
- (England) Arthur Allen from (England) Leicester Lions
- (England) Luke Rokomoce from (England) British Army

=== Players out ===
- (England) Jake Shine to (England) Coventry
- (England) Ryan Olowofela to (England) Doncaster Knights
- (England) Jamie Annand to (England) Cambridge
- (Germany) Sebastian Ferreira (retired)
- (England) Antonio Harris (retired)
- (New Zealand) Nathan Tweedy (retired)
- (England) Toby Venner (retired)
- (New Zealand) Javiah Pohe to (England) Burton
- (England) Kai Owen to (England) Chinnor
- (England) Harry Clayton to (England) London Scottish
- (England) Aman Johal to (England) Bishop's Stortford
- (England) Jai Johal to (England) Bishop's Stortford
- (England) Marcus Ramage to Hong Kong Scottish
- (England) Xavier Valentine to (England) Rotherham Titans

== Richmond ==
=== Players in ===
- (Hong Kong) Paul Altier from (France) Chambéry
- (England) Alex Ashton from (England) Dings Crusaders
- (South Africa) Jason Baggott from (Scotland) Watsonian
- (England) Alex Brosch from (England) Newcastle University
- (England) Seb Brownhill from (England) Cambridge
- (Ireland) Donnacha Byrne from (Ireland) Garryowen
- (England) Jared Cardew from (England) Cambridge
- (England) Freddie Charles from (England) Durham University
- (England) Luke Frost from (England) Bedford Blues
- (England) Tom Hamble from (England) Hartpury University
- (England) Harry Hocking from (England) Cornish Pirates
- (England) Dan Ormerod from (England) Newcastle University
- (South Africa) Ronnie du Randt from (England) Rotherham Titans
- (England) Aron Suggate from (England) Leeds Beckett University
- (England) Brodie Young from (England) Newcastle University

=== Players out ===
- (South Africa) Vaughan Bentley to (England) London Scottish

== Worcester Warriors ==
=== Players in ===
- (England) Matt Kvesic from (England) Coventry
- Juan Gonzalez from Uruguay Sevens
- (England) Josh Bassett from (England) Leicester Tigers
- (England) Tiff Eden from (England) Saracens
- (Wales) Lloyd Williams from (England) Ealing Trailfinders
- (Australia) Tim Anstee from (United States) RFC Los Angeles
- (England) Fraser Balmain from (England) Saracens
- (Wales) Will Reed from (Wales) Dragons
- (Fiji) Livai Natave from (Fiji) Fijian Drua
- (Fiji) Tim Hoyt from (England) Leicester Tigers
- (England) Will Trewin from (England) Cornish Pirates
- (England) Billy Keast from (England) Exeter Chiefs
- (England) Archie Vanes from (England) Leicester Tigers
- (England) Billy Twelvetrees (unattached)
- (England) Jake Garside from (England) Northampton Saints
- (Scotland) James Tyas from (England) Coventry
- (England) Rory Taylor from (England) Gloucester
- (England) Louis Brown from (England) Newcastle Red Bulls
- (England) Will Lane from (England) Coventry
- (England) Will Biggs from (England) Coventry
- (South Africa) Thabo Ndimande from (South Africa) Griquas
- (France) Côme Joussain from (England) Leicester Tigers
- (England) Obinna Nkwocha from (England) Coventry
- (England) Abdul-Khalik Akenzua Al-Kareem from (England) Bath
- (Scotland) Callum Smyth from (Scotland) Glasgow Warriors
- (England) Roma Zheng from (England) Harlequins
- (England) James Short from (England) Bath
- (England) Tom Seabrook from (England) Northampton Saints
- (England) Matt Rogerson from (England) Leicester Tigers
- (England) Alfie Garside from (England) Bedford Blues
- (England) Ashley Challenger from (England) London Scottish
- (Wales) Tom Golder from (England) Harlequins
- (England) Chris Preen from (England) Loughborough Students RUFC
- (Fiji) Siva Naulago from (England) Bristol Bears
- (England) Austin Wallis from (England) London Scottish
- (Wales) George Young from (Wales) Dragons
- (England) Hallam Chapman from (England) Exeter Chiefs
- (New Zealand) Tom Hendrickson from (New Zealand) North Harbour

== See also ==
- List of 2025–26 Premiership Rugby transfers
- List of 2025–26 United Rugby Championship transfers
- List of 2025–26 Super Rugby transfers
- List of 2025–26 Top 14 transfers
- List of 2025–26 Rugby Pro D2 transfers
- List of 2025–26 Major League Rugby transfers
