= 2022–23 Premiership Rugby Cup =

50th Rugby tournament in England

Tournament details
- Countries: England
- Tournament format(s): Round-robin and knockout
- Date: 20 September 2022 — 19 March 2023

Tournament statistics
- Teams: 11

Final
- Venue: Gtech Community Stadium
- Champions: Exeter Chiefs (1st title)
- Runners-up: London Irish

The 2022–23 Premiership Rugby Cup is the 50th season of England's national rugby union cup competition and the fourth under the new Premiership Rugby Cup format following the disbanding of the Anglo-Welsh Cup at the end of the 2017–18 season due to the withdrawal of the Welsh Pro14 regions. Although there are no stipulations on player selection, the cup will be seen by many clubs as a development competition, and games will take place during the Autumn internationals and during the Six Nations.

Worcester Warriors entered the competition as reigning champions, becoming the third winners of the Premiership Cup when they defeated London Irish by virtue of scoring more tries in a 25–25 draw at the Brentford Community Stadium in the 2021–22 final.

== Competition format ==
The competition consists of the thirteen Premiership Rugby teams arranged in three pools. Pool 1 will consist of five teams whilst pools B and C will consist of four. Each team will play each team in their pool once only and, in the case of pools 2 and 3, also play an additional inter pool match. There will be five rounds of matches meaning each team will receive one bye. The top team in each pool, plus the best overall runner-up, will progress to the semi-finals, with the highest ranked teams having home advantage. The winners of the semi-finals will then meet at the final in May 2023 to be held at the home ground of the highest ranked remaining team.

=== Teams ===
2021–22 Premiership Rugby Cup teams
Greater London Premiership Rugby Cup teams

Club	Director of Rugby/ Head coach	Captain	Kit supplier	Stadium	Capacity	City/Area
Bath	(South Africa) Johann van Graan	(England) Ben Spencer	Macron	The Recreation Ground	14,509	Bath
Bristol Bears	(Samoa) Pat Lam	(New Zealand) Steve Luatua	Umbro	Ashton Gate	27,000	Bristol
Exeter Chiefs	(England) Rob Baxter	(England) Jack Yeandle	Samurai Sportswear	Sandy Park	13,593	Exeter
Gloucester	(England) George Skivington	(England) Lewis Ludlow	Oxen Sports	Kingsholm Stadium	16,115	Gloucester
Harlequins	(Australia) Billy Millard (Note: Director of Rugby Performance)	(South Africa) Stephan Lewies	Castore	Twickenham Stoop	14,800	Twickenham, Greater London
Leicester Tigers	(England) Steve Borthwick	(South Africa) Hanro Liebenberg	Samurai Sportswear	Mattioli Woods Welford Road	25,849	Leicester
London Irish	(Ireland) Declan Kidney	(England) Matt Rogerson	BLK	Gtech Community Stadium	17,250	Brentford, Greater London
Newcastle Falcons	(England) Dave Walder	(England) Will Welch	Macron	Kingston Park	10,200	Newcastle upon Tyne
Northampton Saints	(England) Phil Dowson	(England) Lewis Ludlam	Macron	cinch Stadium at Franklin's Gardens	15,200	Northampton
Sale Sharks	(England) Alex Sanderson	(South Africa) Jono Ross	Macron	AJ Bell Stadium	12,000	Salford, Greater Manchester
Saracens	(Ireland) Mark McCall	(England) Owen Farrell	Castore	StoneX Stadium	10,500	Hendon, Greater London
Wasps (Note: Wasps were expelled from the tournament on 28 October)	(England) Lee Blackett	(England) Joe Launchbury	Hummel	Coventry Building Society Arena	32,609	Coventry
Worcester Warriors (Note: Worcester were expelled from the tournament on 6 October 2022.)	(England) Steve Diamond	(England) Ted Hill	O'Neills	Sixways Stadium	11,499	Worcester

== Pools ==
=== Pool 1 ===
Pool 1
	Club	Played	Won	Drawn	Lost	Points for	Points against	Points difference	Tries for	Tries against	Try bonus	Losing bonus	Points
1	Exeter Chiefs	4	4	0	0	138	63	63	19	12	3	0	19
2	Gloucester	4	3	0	1	149	32	49	22	16	4	0	16
3	Bristol Bears	4	2	0	2	123	92	31	20	14	4	1	13
4	Bath	4	0	0	3	44	83	-65	6	16	0	1	1
If teams are level at any stage, tiebreakers are applied in the following order: 1. Number of matches won 2. Difference between points for and against 3. Total number of points for 4. Total number of tries scored
Green background means the club has qualified for the semi-finals as pool winner. Blue background means the club has qualified for the semi-finals as the best pool runner-up. Updated: 5 January 2023; Note that each team plays 4 games.

=== Pool 2 ===
Pool 2
	Club	Played	Won	Drawn	Lost	Points for	Points against	Points difference	Tries for	Tries against	Try bonus	Losing bonus	Points
1	Sale Sharks	4	3	0	1	113	102	11	16	15	2	0	14
2	Leicester Tigers	4	2	0	2	133	82	51	20	10	3	2	13
3	Newcastle Falcons	4	1	0	3	102	126	-24	13	18	2	1	7
If teams are level at any stage, tiebreakers are applied in the following order: 1. Number of matches won 2. Difference between points for and against 3. Total number of points for 4. Total number of tries scored
Green background means the club has qualified for the semi-finals as pool winner. Blue background means the club has qualified for the semi-finals as the best pool runner-up. Updated: 5 January 2023; Note that each team plays 4 games; 3 pool games plus a derby game against a team in another pool.

=== Pool 3 ===
Pool 3
	Club	Played	Won	Drawn	Lost	Points for	Points against	Points difference	Tries for	Tries against	Try bonus	Losing bonus	Points
1	London Irish	4	4	0	0	127	85	42	19	13	4	0	20
2	Northampton Saints	4	3	0	1	164	119	45	24	19	4	1	17
3	Harlequins	4	1	0	3	114	150	-36	18	22	3	1	8
4	Saracens	4	0	0	4	99	186	-87	16	29	3	0	3
If teams are level at any stage, tiebreakers are applied in the following order: 1. Number of matches won 2. Difference between points for and against 3. Total number of points for 4. Total number of tries scored
Green background means the club has qualified for the semi-finals as pool winner. Blue background means the club has qualified for the semi-finals as the best pool runner-up. Updated: 5 January 2023; Note that each team plays 4 games; 3 pool games plus a derby game against a team in another pool.

== Fixtures ==
=== Round 1 ===
20 September 2022
19:45

Sale Sharks	25 – 19	Leicester Tigers (1 BP)
Try: Dugdale 31' c Reed 45' c Beaumont 49' m Con: Wilkinson (2/3) 32', 46'; Pen: Wilkinson (2/3) 19', 78'	Report	Try: Penalty Try 8'; Horton 54' m Chessum 56' c Pen: Walsh (1/2) 57'

Salford City Stadium

20 September 2022
19:45

(1 BP) Wasps	35 – 21	Newcastle Falcons
Try: Curran 4' c Fisilau 19' c van Vuuren (2) 30' c, 58' c Craven 64' c Con: Haydon-Wood (5/5) 4', 21', 30', 59', 64'	Report	Try: Greenwood 51' c Peters 77' c Stephens 80' c Con: Johnson (3/3) 51', 77', 80'

Coventry Building Society Arena

21 September 2022
19:45

(1 BP) Gloucester	~~49 – 21~~ (Note: Match result and player scores deleted from record, after Worcester were relegated from the league.)	~~Worcester Warriors~~
Try: ~~Reeves (2) 3' c, 50' c~~ ~~Clark 13' c~~ ~~Clement 54' c~~ ~~Seabrook 64' c~~ ~~Thomas (2) 76' c, 80' c~~ Con: ~~Barton (7/7) 4', 14', 51' 55', 66', 77', 80'~~	Report	Try: ~~Doel 28' c~~ ~~Theobald-Thomas 37' c~~ ~~Wilson 71' c~~ Con: ~~Titcombe (3/3) 29', 38', 72'~~

Kingsholm

21 September 2022
19:45

(2 BP) Harlequins	26 – 30	London Irish (1 BP)
Try: Green 30' c Edwards 52' c Riley 63' m Cleaves 65' c Con: Edwards (3/4) 31', 53', 66'	Report	Try: Harrison 4' m Dykes 6' c O'Sullivan 9' m Harmes 54' c Con: Jennings (2/4) 8', 55'; Pen: Jennings (2/2) 46', 61'

Twickenham Stoop

5 October 2022 (Note: Postponed from 8 September due to the death of Queen Elizabeth II)
19:45

(1 BP) Northampton Saints	58 – 34	Saracens (1 BP)
Try: Matavesi 2' m Sleightholme (2) 5' c, 40' m Skosan (3) 15' m, 42' c, 48' m Pollock (2) 23' c, 70' c Hinkley 75' c Con: Grayson (5/9) 6', 24', 43', 71', 76'; Pen: Grayson (1/1) 68'	Report	Try: Moore 12' c Adejimi (4) 26' m, 44' c, 54' m, 65' m Wilson 78' m Con: Vunipola (2/6) 13', 45'

cinch Stadium at Franklin's Gardens

26 November 2022
15:00

Exeter Chiefs	25 - 22	Bath Rugby (1 BP)
Try: Tuima 19' c Davis (2) 37' c, 63' m Con: Jenkins (2/3) 20', 37'; Pen: Jenkins (2/2) 5', 16'	Report	Try: Richards 40' c Harris 45' c Carr-Smith 74' m Con: Francis (2/3) 40', 46'; Pen: Francis (1/1) 30'

Sandy Park

Bye/s: Bristol Bears

=== Round 2 ===
27 September 2022
19:00

(1 BP) Leicester Tigers	38 — 17	Wasps
Try: Jansen 21' c Ilione 33' c Saumaki 56' c Edwards 69' c Vanes 73' c Con: Walsh (3/3) 22', 35', 57'; Meredith (2/2) 70', 74'; Pen: Walsh (1/1) 50'	Report	Try: Dawkins 9' c Hartley 26' c Con: Haydon-Wood (2/2) 10', 27'; Pen: Haydon-Wood (1/1) 29'

Mattioli Woods Welford Road Stadium

27 September 2022
19:45

(1 BP) London Irish	28 — 26	Northampton Saints (2 BP)
Try: Chapman (2) 50' c, 60' c Trotter 75' c Penalty try 80'; Con: Jennings (3/3) 51', 61', 76'	Report	Try: Graham 17' c Ramm (2) 25' c, 27' m Heffernan 55' c Con: Grayson (3/4) 17', 26', 55'

Gtech Community Stadium

27 September 2022
19:45

Newcastle Falcons	21 — 29	Sale Sharks (1 BP)
Try: Tiffen 10' c Obatoyinbo 61' m Con: Thomas (1/2) 11'; Pen: Thomas (2/2) 30', 40'; Blackett (2/2) 64'	Report	Try: Gourlay 35' c Jones 42' c Morris 48' m Pope 66' c Con: Curtis (3/4) 36', 43', 67'; Pen: Curtis (1/2) 79'

Kingston Park
Attendance: 2,371

28 September 2022
19:30

(1 BP) Harlequins	40 — 31	Saracens (1 BP)
Try: Jibulu 26' c Slevin 30' c Carr 40' c Murray 53' c Bradley 55' c Osborne 62' m Con: Benson (5/6) 27', 31', 40', 53', 56'	Report	Try: Stonham 8' m Lewis (2) 16' m, 66' c Jackson 68' c Harris 73' c Con: Vunipola (3/6) 65', 67', 74'

Twickenham Stoop

28 September 2022
19:45

Bath Rugby	15 — 29	Gloucester Rugby (1 BP)
Try: Doughty 26' c Stewart 61' m Con: Worboys (1/2) 26'; Pen: Worboys (1/1) 16'	Report	Try: Polledri 11' c Reeves (2) 41' c, 49' c Moyle 56' m Con: Barton (3/4) 12', 42', 50'; Pen: Barton (1/1) 66'

Recreation Ground

28 September 2022
19:45

(1 BP) Bristol Bears	20 — 35	Exeter Chiefs (1 BP)
Try: Rowson 17' m Whiteley 44' m Jenkins (2) 72' m, 79' m	Report	Try: Penalty try 20'; Innard 15' c Pearson (2) 29' c, 47' c O’Brien 50' c Con: Becconsall (4/4) 26', 29', 47', 51'

Ashton Gate

Bye/s: Worcester Warriors

=== Round 3 ===
11 October 2022
19:45

(1 BP) Northampton Saints	49 — 29	Harlequins (1 BP)
Try: Sylvester 8' c Scott-Young 14' c Collins (2) 17' c, 39' c Hendy 24' c Lockett 32' c James 53' c Con: Grayson (4/4) 9', 15', 18', 25'; Matavesi (3/3) 32', 40', 54'	Report	Try: Cleaves 5' c Oresanya 22' c Slevin 31' m Edwards (2) 74' m, 80' m Con: Edwards (2/4) 7', 27'

cinch Stadium at Franklin's Gardens

17 October 2022
19:45

(1 BP) Saracens	26 — 43	London Irish (1 BP)
Try: Stonham 20' c Moore (2) 41' m, 70' c Reynolds-West 78' c Con: Vunipola (1/2) 21'; Elliot (2/2) 70', 79'	Report	Try: Gigena 6' c Hitchcock 11' c Basham 22' m Dykes (3) 25' c, 38' m, 46' m Harmes 31' c Con: Jennings (4/7) 7', 12', 27', 32'

StoneX Stadium

18 October 2022
19:45

Wasps	Cancelled (Note: Match cancelled due to Wasps entering administration and being suspended from all competitions.)	Sale Sharks

Coventry Building Society Arena

19 October 2022
19:00

(2 BP) Leicester Tigers	31 - 32	Newcastle Falcons (1 BP)
Try: Horton 14' m Jansen 50' m Manz 56' c Vanes (2) 65' c, 68' c Con: Walsh (3/5) 57', 66', 68'	Report	Try: Tait (2) 8' m, 61' c Obatoyinbo 16' c Fletcher 79' c Con: Schoeman (2/3) 17', 61'; Johnson (1/1) 80'; Pen: Schoeman (2/2) 32', 53'

Mattioli Woods Welford Road Stadium

19 October 2022
19:45

Bath Rugby	0 - 29	Bristol Bears (1 BP)
	Report	Try: Thacker (3) 5' c, 38' m, 45' m Bailey 10' m Purdy 67' c Con: MacGinty (2/5) 5', 68'

Recreation Ground

Bye/s: Exeter Chiefs, Gloucester Rugby

=== Round 4 ===
18 November 2022
19:45

(1 BP) Sale Sharks	40 — 19	Harlequins
Try: Birch (2) 15' c, 55' m Postlethwaite 42' c Caine 65' c Wilkinson (2) 71' c, 80' c Con: Curtis (3/4) 16', 44', 80'; Wilkinson (2/2) 66', 74'	Report	Try: Barnes 4' m Lawday 48' c Anderson 77' c Con: Slevin (2/3) 49', 77'

Salford City Stadium

19 November 2022
13:00

Saracens	8 — 45	Leicester Tigers (1 BP)
Try: Elliot 20' m Pen: Elliot (1/1) 36'	Report	Try: Ramage 12' m Jansen (2) 33' c, 44' m Henderson 38' c van Wyk 68' c Horton (2) 70' c, 80' c Con: Atkinson (5/6) 33', 38', 69', 70', 80'

StoneX Stadium

19 November 2022
15:00

(1 BP) Gloucester Rugby	38 — 31	Bristol Bears (2 BP)
Try: Morris (2) 1' m, 49' m Clement 22' c Knight 33' c Atkinson 40' c Blake 72' c Con: Barton (4/6) 23', 34', 40', 73'	Report	Try: Whiteley (2) 35' c, 69' c Williams 56' c Davies 79' c Con: Williams (4/4) 36', 57' 69', 80'; Pen: Williams (1/1) 7'

Kingsholm

19 November 2022
15:30

(2 BP) Newcastle Falcons	28 — 31	Northampton Saints (1 BP)
Try: Blamire 26' c Kerr 35' c Pepper 40' c Qorowale 71' c Con: Schoeman (3/3) 27', 36', 40'	Report	Try: Irvine 4' c Nansen 9' c Skosan 19' c Smith 52' c Con: Matavesi (4/4) 5', 10', 19', 52'; Pen: Matavesi (1/1) 56'

Kingston Park
Attendance: 2,231

Bye/s: Bath Rugby, Exeter Chiefs

=== Round 5 ===
4 December 2022
15:00

(1 BP) Exeter Chiefs	50 - 33	Gloucester Rugby (1 BP)
Try: Feyi-Waboso 4' c Cordero (2) 13' c, 17' m Tuima (2) 26' c, 44' c Frost (2) 63' c, 70' c Con: Jenkins (6/7) 4', 13', 26', 45', 64', 70'; Pen: Jenkins (1/1) 24'	Report	Try: Meehan 13' c Blake 22' m Morris 53' c Morgan 77' c Reeves 80' c Con: Barton (4/5) 13', 53', 78', 80'

Sandy Park

Bye/s: Bath Rugby, Bristol Bears, Harlequins, Leicester Tigers, London Irish, Newcastle Falcons, Northampton Saints, Sale Sharks, Saracens

=== Round 6 ===
4 January 2023
19:45

(1 BP) London Irish	26 - 7	Bath Rugby
Try: Cornish (2) 20' c, 42' c Scragg 29' c Mille 75' m Con: Atkins (3/4) 20', 30', 45'		Try: Ellis 80' c Con: Harris (1/1) 80'

Gtech Community Stadium

3 February 2023
19:45

(1 BP) Bristol Bears	43 - 19	Sale Sharks
Try: Lloyd (3) 10' m, 30' m, 37' c Heward 24' c Holmes 35' c Ascherl 46' c Davies 57' m Con: Williams (3/6) 35', 38', 46'; Sheedy (1/1) 25'		Try: Gourlay (2) 39' m, 70' c Roebuck 74' c Con: Curtis (2/3) 71', 74'

Ashton Gate

Notes: The matches in Round 6 were not part of the initial schedule of the competition, and were instead added to the fixture list to ensure that each team played the same number of matches following Worcester Warriors and Wasps being unable to complete their allotted fixtures.

Bye/s:

=== Semi-final ===
10 February 2023
19:45

London Irish	30–18	Northampton Saints
Try: Cinti 11' c Basham 44' c Poolman 77' c Con: Jennings (3/3) 12', 45', 78'; Pen: Jennings (3/3) 34', 40', 70'		Try: Sleightholme 3' m Litchfield 37' c Con: Grayson (1/2) 37'; Pen: Grayson (2/2) 47', 61'

Gtech Community Stadium

12 February 2023
13:00

(1 BP) Exeter Chiefs	46–3	Sale Sharks

Sandy Park

=== Final ===
19 March 2023
14:00

London Irish	20–24 (a.e.t.)	Exeter Chiefs
Try: Ruiz 15', 35'; Con: Atkins (16', 36'); Pen: Atkins (46', 88')	Report	Try: Innard 26'; Iosefa-Scott 76'; Davis 89'; Con: Jenkins (27'); Simmonds (77, 90'); Pen: Jenkins (39')

Gtech Community Stadium
Attendance: 7,663
Referee: Adam Leal

London Irish
Exeter Chiefs

FW	15	(England) James Stokes
W	14	(England) Matt Williams		(substituted off) 64'
C	13	(England) Will Joseph		(substituted off) 54'
C	12	(England) Tom Hitchcock
W	11	(England) Michael Dykes
FH	10	(England) Jacob Atkins
SH	9	(England) Hugh O'Sullivan		(substituted off) 90'
N8	8	(Samoa) So'otala Fa'aso'o		(substituted off) 53'
F	7	(England) Josh Basham	(yellow card) 76'
F	6	(Ireland) Jack Cooke (c)
L	5	(England) Chunya Munga
L	4	(England) Josh Caulfield		(substituted off) 90'
P	3	(Zimbabwe) Lovejoy Chawatama		(substituted off) 65'
H	2	(Argentina) Ignacio Ruiz
P	1	(England) Facundo Gigena		(substituted off) 51'
Substitutions:
F		(Argentina) Juan M. González		(substituted on) 53'
C		(Australia) Eddie Poolman		(substituted on) 54'
C		(England) Harnes		(substituted on) 64'
H		(Ireland) Caolan Englefield		(substituted on) 90'
P		(England) Tarek Haffar		(substituted on) 51'
H		(England) Matt Cornish		(substituted on) 64'
P		(England) Ciaran Parker		(substituted on) 65'
L		(Wales) Ed Scragg		(substituted on) 90'
Head Coach:
(Australia) Les Kiss

FW	15	(England) Tom Wyatt
W	14	(Wales) Dan John
C	13	(Ireland) Seán O'Brien
C	12	(New Zealand) Tom Hendrickson		(substituted off) 56'
W	11	(Ireland) Rory O'Loughlin
FH	10	(Wales) Iwan Jenkins		(substituted off) 72'
SH	9	(England) Tom Cairns		(substituted off) 51'
N8	8	(England) Rus Tuima
F	7	(South Africa) Aidon Davis
F	6	(Wales) Christ Tshiunza
L	5	(Ireland) Jack Dunne
L	4	(Zimbabwe) Mike Williams		(substituted off) 56'
P	3	(Namibia) Patrick Schickerling		(substituted off) 56'
H	2	(England) Jack Innard		Substituted off
P	1	(England) Danny Southworth	(yellow card) 33'	(substituted off) 64'
Substitutions:
P		(New Zealand) Josh Iosefa-Scott		(substituted on) 56'
H		(Wales) Iestyn Harris		Substituted on
L		(South Africa) Jannes Kirsten		(substituted on) 56'
C		(England) Ollie Devoto		(substituted on) 56'
FB		(England) Joe Simmonds		(substituted on) 72'
H		(England) Will Becconsall		(substituted on) 51'
P		(England) James Kenny		(substituted on) 64'
Head Coach:
(England) Ali Hepher

== See also ==
- Premiership Rugby
- Anglo-Welsh Cup
- 2022–23 RFU Championship Cup
- English rugby union system
- List of English rugby union teams
- Rugby union in England
