= Danny Eite =

English rugby union player

- Born: Danny Eite; 28 June 2003 (age 23) Sutton Coldfield, England
- Height: 1.98 m (6 ft 6 in)
- Weight: 115 kg (18 st 2 lb)
- School: Sherborne Qatar
- University: Hartpury College

Rugby union career
- Position: Lock
- Current team: Gloucester
Senior career
Years	Team	Apps	(Points)
2022–	Gloucester	23	(15)
2022–2023	→ Hartpury University (loan)	10	(0)
- Correct as of 16 May 2026
International career
Years	Team	Apps	(Points)
2021–2022	England U18s	0	(0)
2022–2023	England U20s	4	(0)

Danny Eite (born 28 June 2003) is an English professional rugby union player who plays as a lock for PREM Rugby club Gloucester.

== Career ==
Eite spent much of his childhood playing sevens in Qatar and has transferred those skills to the 15-a-side game with Gloucester. Eite enjoyed a breakthrough season with both club and country as he made his Gloucester debut in the 2022–23 Premiership Rugby Cup against both Bristol Bears and Exeter Chiefs. He also played in four of England's five games during the 2023 Six Nations Under 20s Championship.

Eite also was dual-registered with Hartpury University in the RFU Championship. On 19 June 2025, it was confirmed that Eite would be promoted to the senior squad for Gloucester ahead of the 2025–26 season.
