= List of 2025–26 Top 14 transfers =

This is a list of player transfers involving Top 14 teams before or during the 2025–26 season. The list is of deals that are confirmed and are either from or to a rugby union team in the Top 14 during the 2024–25 season. It is not unknown for confirmed deals to be cancelled at a later date.

On 8 June 2024, Montauban defeated Grenoble 24-19 to win the 2024–25 Rugby Pro D2 season to be promoted to the Top 14 for the 2025–26 season. Whilst Vannes are relegated to the Pro D2 for the 2025–26 season.

== Bayonne ==
=== Players In ===
- (South Africa) Herschel Jantjies from (South Africa) Stormers
- (Argentina) Ignacio Calles from (France) Pau
- (France) Alexandre Fischer from (France) Clermont
- (Scotland) Ewan Johnson from (France) Oyonnax
- (Australia) Rob Leota from (Australia) NSW Waratahs
- (France) Emerick Setiano from (France) Toulon
- (Wales) Gareth Anscombe from (England) Gloucester
- (Samoa) Marco Fepulea'i from (France) Colomiers

=== Players Out ===
- (Algeria) Nadir Megdoud to (France) Grenoble
- (France) Xan Mousques to (France) Bordeaux
- (France) Denis Marchois to (France) Agen
- (France) Camille Lopez (retired)
- (France) Aurélien Callandret to (France) Grenoble
- (South Africa) Pieter Scholtz to (Japan) Mitsubishi Sagamihara DynaBoars
- (South Africa) Uzair Cassiem to (France) Oyonnax
- (Argentina) Martin Villar to (France) Oyonnax
- (France) Gaëtan Germain (retired)
- (France) Rémi Bourdeau to (France) Biarritz
- (Spain) Guillaume Rouet to (France) Nissa
- (New Zealand) Veikoso Poloniati to (New Zealand) Moana Pasifika

== Bordeaux ==
=== Players In ===
- (France) Louis Mary from (France) Dax
- (France) Xan Mousques from (France) Bayonne
- (Italy) Martin Page-Relo from (France) Lyon
- (South Africa) Jean-Luc du Preez from (England) Sale Sharks
- (France) Cameron Woki from (France) Racing 92
- (Fiji) Salesi Rayasi from (France) Vannes
- (France) Gaëtan Barlot from (France) Castres
- (France) Boris Palu from (France) Racing 92

=== Players Out ===
- (France) Nans Ducuing (retired)
- (Argentina) Guido Petti to (England) Harlequins
- (Australia) Pete Samu to (Australia) NSW Waratahs
- (France) Romain Latterade to (France) Provence
- (France) Mahamadou Diaby to (France) Perpignan
- (Australia) Ben Tapuai to (France) Brive
- (France) Enzo Reybier to (France) Oyonnax
- (Japan) Tevita Tatafu to (Japan) Tokyo Sungoliath
- (France) Mateo Garcia to (France) Toulon
- (France) Alexandre Ricard to (France) Brive
- (France) Yann Lesgourgues to (France) Biarritz
- (France) Jon Echegaray to (France) Montpellier

== Castres ==
=== Players In ===
- (France) Teddy Durand from (France) Oyonnax
- (Fiji) Veresa Ramotoabua from (France) Oyonnax
- (Fiji) Vuate Karawalevu from (Fiji) Fijian Drua
- (France) Adam Vargas from (France) Valence Romans
- (France) Enzo Hervé from (France) Toulon

=== Players Out ===
- (France) Gaëtan Barlot to (France) Bordeaux
- (France) Joris Dupont to (France) Mont-de-Marsan
- Antoine Zeghdar to France Sevens
- (Samoa) Izaiha Moore-Aiono to (France) Valence Romans
- (France) Yann Peysson to (France) Brive
- (Georgia (country)) Luka Matkava to (France) Oyonnax
- (France) Julien Dumora (retired)
- (France) Adrien Seguret to (France) La Rochelle

== Clermont ==
=== Players In ===
- (New Zealand) Harry Plummer from (New Zealand) Blues
- (Fiji) Pio Muarua from (France) Grenoble
- (Fiji) Alivereti Loaloa from (France) Nevers
- (France) Lucas Zamora from (France) Soyaux Angoulême
- (Fiji) Tevita Ratuva from (France) Brive
- (France) Selevasio Tolofua from (France) Toulon
- (Samoa) Seilala Lam from (France) Perpignan

=== Players Out ===
- (Fiji) Peceli Yato to (France) Perpignan
- (Samoa) Fritz Lee (retired)
- (France) Alexandre Fischer to (France) Bayonne
- (France) Enzo Sanga (retired)
- (France) Anthony Belleau to (England) Northampton Saints
- (Germany) Oskar Rixen to (France) Nevers
- (France) Théo Giral to (France) Colomiers
- (France) Jules Bousquet to (France) Nevers
- (France) Samuel M'Foudi to (France) Céret
- (Australia) Folau Fainga'a to (Australia) NSW Waratahs
- (Samoa) Michael Alaalatoa to (Ireland) Munster

== La Rochelle ==
=== Players In ===
- (France) Nolann Le Garrec from (France) Racing 92
- (Georgia (country)) Davit Niniashvili from (France) Lyon
- (France) Ugo Pacome from (France) Colomiers
- (Fiji) Semi Lagivala from (France) Mont-de-Marsan
- (France) Adrien Seguret from (France) Castres
- (France) Andy Timo from (France) Stade Français Paris
- (Fiji) Watisoni Waqanisaravi from (Georgia (country)) RC Kazbegi

=== Players Out ===
- (France) Georges-Henri Colombe to (France) Toulouse
- (France) Teddy Thomas to (France) Toulouse
- (France) Brice Dulin (retired)
- (France) Romain Lamit to (France) Bourg-en-Bresse
- (New Zealand) Tawera Kerr-Barlow to (France) Stade Français Paris
- (France) Thierry Paiva to (France) Stade Français Paris
- (France) Mathis Brunet to (France) Stade Niortais
- (France) Uini Atonio (retired)

== Lyon ==
=== Players In ===
- (England) Sam Simmonds from (France) Montpellier
- (France) Mathis Sarragallet from (France) Grenoble
- (France) Gabin Lorre from (France) Béziers
- (France) Thomas Moukoro from (France) Vannes
- (Fiji) Iosefo Masi from (Fiji) Fijian Drua
- (Fiji) Jiuta Wainiqolo from (France) Toulon
- (South Africa) Janse Roux from (France) Colomiers

=== Players Out ===
- (France) Yanis Charcosset to (France) Brive
- (Georgia (country)) Davit Niniashvili to (France) La Rochelle
- (Italy) Martin Page-Relo to (France) Bordeaux
- (Fiji) Sam Matavesi to (England) Camborne
- (France) Sébastien Taofifénua to (France) Provence
- (Fiji) Semi Radradra to (Japan) Shizuoka Blue Revs
- (France) Alban Roussel to (France) Oyonnax
- (France) Pierre-Samuel Pacheco to (France) Oyonnax
- (France) Wayan de Benedittis to (France) Vannes
- (France) Valentin Simutoga to (France) Montauban
- (Argentina) Tomás Lavanini to (New Zealand) Highlanders

== Montauban ==
=== Players In ===
- (Tonga) Vaea Fifita from (Wales) Scarlets
- (United States) Nafi Ma'afu from (France) Biarritz
- (Georgia (country)) Nugzar Somkhishvili from (France) Chambéry
- (France) Valentin Simutoga from (France) Lyon
- (New Zealand) Gibson Popoali'i from (New Zealand) Counties Manukau
- (New Zealand) Sione Mafileo from (New Zealand) Moana Pasifika

=== Players Out ===
- (Samoa) Tietie Tuimauga to (England) Saracens
- (Georgia (country)) Mirian Burduli to (France) Aurillac
- (Fiji) Seva Galala to (France) Stade Niortais
- (France) Kévin Gimeno (retired)
- (France) Malino Vanai (retired)
- (France) Dimitri Vaotoa (retired)

== Montpellier ==
=== Players In ===
- (Australia) Langi Gleeson from (Australia) NSW Waratahs
- (New Zealand) Ricky Riccitelli from (New Zealand) Blues
- (Australia) Tom Banks from (Japan) Mie Honda Heat
- (Argentina) Justo Piccardo from (Argentina) Pampas XV
- (Wales) Adam Beard from (Wales) Ospreys
- (England) Lennox Anyanwu from (England) Harlequins
- (Scotland) Ali Price from (Scotland) Edinburgh
- (France) Donovan Taofifénua from (France) Racing 92
- (France) Jon Echegaray from (France) Bordeaux
- (France) Mahamadou Diaby from (France) Perpignan

=== Players Out ===
- (England) Sam Simmonds to (France) Lyon
- (South Africa) Nico Janse van Rensburg to (South Africa) Bulls
- (South Africa) Jan Serfontein to (South Africa) Bulls
- (South Africa) Cobus Reinach to (South Africa) Stormers
- (France) Anthony Bouthier to (France) Vannes
- (France) Pierre Lucas to (France) Provence
- (Portugal) Nicolas Martins to (France) Colomiers
- (France) Kilian Bakour to (France) Bourg-en-Bresse
- (Georgia (country)) Vano Karkadze to (France) Oyonnax
- (New Zealand) George Bridge to (Australia) Western Force
- (France) Julien Tisseron to (France) Brive
- (France) Martin Doan (retired)
- (France) Paul Willemse (retired)
- (France) Hugo Reus to (France) Perpignan

== Pau ==
=== Players In ===
- (Argentina) Facundo Isa from (France) Toulon
- (France) Thomas Laclayat from (France) Racing 92
- (Argentina) Julian Montoya from (England) Leicester Tigers

=== Players Out ===
- (Argentina) Ignacio Calles to (France) Bayonne
- (France) Eliott Roudil to (France) Vannes
- (England) Harry Williams to (England) Harlequins
- (South Africa) Dan Jooste to (France) Narbonne
- (France) Romain Ruffenach to (France) Grenoble
- (Fiji) Lekima Tagitagivalu to (France) Racing 92

== Perpignan ==
=== Players In ===
- (South Africa) Tristan Tedder from (France) Racing 92
- (Samoa) Sama Malolo from (New Zealand) Moana Pasifika
- (Fiji) Peceli Yato from (France) Clermont
- (Scotland) Jamie Ritchie from (Scotland) Edinburgh
- (France) Mattéo Le Corvec from (France) Toulon
- (Samoa) Duncan Paia'aua from (France) Toulon
- (France) Mahamadou Diaby from (France) Bordeaux
- (Australia) Jordan Petaia from (United States) Los Angeles Chargers (American Football)
- (Argentina) Benjamin Urdapilleta (unattached)
- (France) Hugo Reus from (France) Montpellier

=== Players Out ===
- (Samoa) So'otala Fa'aso'o to (Italy) Benetton
- (Italy) Alessandro Ortombina to (Italy) Zebre Parma
- (South Africa) Marvin Orie to (South Africa) Sharks
- (France) Alan Brazo (retired)
- (France) Jean-Pascal Barraque to (France) Nissa
- (France) Tristan Labouteley to (France) Grenoble (season-long loan)
- (Fiji) Apisai Naqalevu to (France) Narbonne
- (France) Lucas Bachelier to (France) Narbonne
- (France) Louis Dupichot to (France) Agen
- (Samoa) Seilala Lam to (France) Clermont
- (France) Mahamadou Diaby to (France) Montpellier

== Racing 92 ==
=== Players In ===
- (France) Léo Carbonneau from (France) Brive
- (Fiji) Selestino Ravutaumada from (Fiji) Fijian Drua
- (England) Jonny Hill from (England) Sale Sharks
- (France) Wilfred Hulleu from (France) Grenoble
- (England) Nathan Hughes from (Japan) Urayasu D-Rocks
- (Australia) Taniela Tupou from (Australia) NSW Waratahs
- (Argentina) Gerónimo Prisciantelli from (Italy) Zebre Parma
- (New Zealand) Joey Manu from (Japan) Toyota Verblitz
- (France) Thomas Lainault from (France) Grenoble
- (Fiji) Lekima Tagitagivalu from (France) Pau
- (France) Ugo Seunes from (France) Aurillac

=== Players Out ===
- (South Africa) Tristan Tedder to (France) Perpignan
- (France) Nolann Le Garrec to (France) La Rochelle
- (France) Clovis Le Bail to (France) Toulon
- (England) Henry Arundell to (England) Bath
- (France) Thomas Laclayat to (France) Pau
- Paul Leraître to France Sevens
- (England) Owen Farrell to (England) Saracens
- (England) Dan Lancaster to (Scotland) Glasgow Warriors
- (France) Cameron Woki to (France) Bordeaux
- (France) Henry Chavancy (retired)
- (France) Donovan Taofifénua to (France) Montpellier
- (South Africa) Lee-Marvin Mazibuko to (South Africa) Sharks
- (France) Boris Palu to (France) Bordeaux
- (South Africa) Hacjivah Dayimani to (South Africa) Stormers

== Stade Français ==
=== Players In ===
- (New Zealand) Tawera Kerr-Barlow from (France) La Rochelle
- (France) Thierry Paiva from (France) La Rochelle
- (France) Tani Vili from (France) Vannes
- (Samoa) Iakopo Mapu from (England) Northampton Saints
- (United States) Jack Iscaro from (United States) Old Glory DC

=== Players Out ===
- (Georgia (country)) Luka Petriashvili to (France) Nevers
- (Portugal) Raffaele Storti to (France) Grenoble
- (South Africa) JJ van der Mescht to (England) Northampton Saints
- (Argentina) Francisco Gomez Kodela (retired)
- (France) Andy Timo to (France) La Rochelle
- (New Zealand) Brad Weber to (Japan) Mitsubishi Sagamihara DynaBoars

== Toulon ==
=== Players In ===
- (France) Clovis Le Bail from (France) Racing 92
- (Italy) Ignacio Brex from (Italy) Benetton
- (France) Mathis Ferté from (France) Brive
- (Russia) Nikoloz Narmania from (France) Biarritz
- (England) Zach Mercer from (England) Gloucester
- (France) Mateo Garcia from (France) Bordeaux
- (Georgia (country)) Giorgi Javakhia from (France) Grenoble
- (Argentina) Tomás Albornoz from (Italy) Benetton

=== Players Out ===
- (New Zealand) Leicester Fainga'anuku to (New Zealand) Crusaders
- (Argentina) Facundo Isa to (France) Pau
- (France) Jules Danglot to (France) Colomiers
- (France) Mattéo Le Corvec to (France) Perpignan
- (Fiji) Jiuta Wainiqolo to (France) Lyon
- (France) Emerick Setiano to (France) Bayonne
- (Wales) Dan Biggar (retired)
- (Samoa) Duncan Paia'aua to (France) Perpignan
- (France) Selevasio Tolofua to (France) Clermont
- (France) Pablo Patilla to (France) Carcassonne
- (France) Enzo Hervé to (France) Castres
- (France) Mickaël Ivaldi (retired)
- (Russia) Nikoloz Narmania to (France) Carcassonne

== Toulouse ==
=== Players In ===
- (France) Georges-Henri Colombe from (France) La Rochelle
- (France) Teddy Thomas from (France) La Rochelle

=== Players Out ===
- (France) Hugo Reilhès to (France) Brive
- (New Zealand) Nepo Laulala to (England) Gloucester
- (Fiji) Setareki Bituniyata to (France) Provence
- (Australia) Richie Arnold to (France) Soyaux Angoulême
- (France) Alban Placines to (France) Biarritz
- (France) Mathieu Galtier to (France) Albi
- (Tonga) Pita Ahki to (New Zealand) Blues

== See also ==
- List of 2025–26 Premiership Rugby transfers
- List of 2025–26 United Rugby Championship transfers
- List of 2025–26 Super Rugby transfers
- List of 2025–26 Champ Rugby transfers
- List of 2025–26 Rugby Pro D2 transfers
- List of 2025–26 Major League Rugby transfers
