= List of 2025–26 Super Rugby transfers =

This is a list of player transfers involving Super Rugby teams before or during 2026 Super Rugby Pacific season.

== Blues ==
=== Players in ===
- (New Zealand) Bradley Slater from (New Zealand) Chiefs
- (New Zealand) Malachi Wrampling from (New Zealand) Chiefs
- (Tonga) Pita Ahki from (France) Toulouse
- (New Zealand) Flyn Yates from (New Zealand) Manawatu
- (New Zealand) Terrell Peita from (New Zealand) Northland
- (New Zealand) Cody Vai from (New Zealand) Bay of Plenty
- (New Zealand) Kade Banks from (New Zealand) Hurricanes
- (New Zealand) Sam Matenga from (New Zealand) Tasman

=== Players out ===
- (New Zealand) Angus Ta'avao to (New Zealand) Highlanders
- (New Zealand) Harry Plummer to (France) Clermont
- (New Zealand) Ricky Riccitelli to (France) Montpellier
- (New Zealand) Rieko Ioane to (Ireland) Leinster (short-term deal)
- (New Zealand) Mark Tele'a to (Japan) Toyota Verblitz
- (New Zealand) Adrian Choat to (Japan) Sayama Secom Rugguts
- (New Zealand) PJ Sheck to (England) Ealing Trailfinders
- (New Zealand) Hamdahn Tuipulotu to (Japan) Toyota Verblitz

== Brumbies ==
=== Players in ===
- (Australia) Jarrah McLeod from (Australia) Canberra Royals
- (Australia) Kye Oates from (Australia) Canberra Royals
- (Australia) Tane Edmed from (Australia) NSW Waratahs

=== Players out ===
- (Australia) Tom Hooper to (England) Exeter Chiefs
- (Australia) Len Ikitau to (England) Exeter Chiefs
- (Australia) Ben O'Donnell to (France) Aurillac
- (Australia) Jack Debreczeni to (Australia) NSW Waratahs
- (Australia) Lachlan Hooper to (Australia) NSW Waratahs
- (Tonga) Feao Fotuaika to (Australia) Western Force
- (Australia) Harrison Goddard to (Japan) Shimizu Koto Blue Sharks
- (Australia) Noah Lolesio to (Japan) Toyota Industries Corporation Shuttles Aichi

== Chiefs ==
=== Players in ===
- (New Zealand) Kyle Brown from (New Zealand) Manawatu
- (New Zealand) Tepaea Cook-Savage from (New Zealand) Waikato
- (Australia) Lalakai Foketi from (Australia) NSW Waratahs
- (New Zealand) Isaac Hutchinson from (New Zealand) Canterbury
- (New Zealand) Taine Kolose from (New Zealand) Bay of Plenty
- (New Zealand) Benet Kumeroa from (New Zealand) Bay of Plenty
- (Tonga) Kyren Taumoefolau from (New Zealand) Moana Pasifika
- (New Zealand) Tyrone Thompson from (Australia) Newcastle Knights

=== Players out ===
- (Australia) Aidan Ross to (Australia) Queensland Reds
- (New Zealand) Shaun Stevenson to (Japan) Kubota Spears
- (Fiji) Manasa Mataele to (Fiji) Fijian Drua
- (New Zealand) Anton Lienert-Brown to (Japan) Kobelco Kobe Steelers
- (New Zealand) James Thompson to (England) Leicester Tigers
- (New Zealand) Bradley Slater to (New Zealand) Blues
- (New Zealand) Malachi Wrampling to (New Zealand) Blues
- (New Zealand) Manaaki Selby-Rickit to (Japan) Urayasu D-Rocks
- (New Zealand) Jimmy Tupou to (New Zealand) Moana Pasifika
- (New Zealand) Rameka Poihipi to (Japan) Black Rams Tokyo
- (New Zealand) Gideon Wrampling to (Japan) Tokyo Sungoliath
- (New Zealand) Kaleb Trask to (Japan) Tokyo Sungoliath

== Crusaders ==
=== Players in ===
- (New Zealand) Leicester Faingaʻanuku from (New Zealand) Tasman
- (New Zealand) Toby Bell from (New Zealand) Canterbury
- (New Zealand) Louie Chapman from (New Zealand) Canterbury
- (New Zealand) Liam Jack from (New Zealand) Canterbury
- (New Zealand) James White from (New Zealand) Canterbury

=== Players out ===
- (Australia) James O'Connor to (England) Leicester Tigers
- (New Zealand) Levi Aumua to (Japan) Yokohama Canon Eagles
- (New Zealand) Ioane Moananu to (Australia) NSW Waratahs
- (New Zealand) Tom Christie to (England) Newcastle Red Bulls
- (New Zealand) Fletcher Anderson to (Wales) Scarlets

== Drua ==
=== Players in ===
- (Fiji) Temo Mayanavanua from (England) Northampton Saints
- Joji Nasova from Fiji Sevens
- (Fiji) Manasa Mataele from (New Zealand) Chiefs
- (Fiji) Iosefo Namoce from (Australia) Gungahlin Eagles
- (Fiji) Angelo Smith from (Australia) NSW Waratahs
- (Australia) Issak Fines-Leleiwasa from (Australia) Western Force
- (France) Virimi Vakatawa (unattached)

=== Players out ===
- (Fiji) Selestino Ravutaumada to (France) Racing 92
- (Fiji) Iosefo Masi to (France) Lyon
- (Fiji) Livai Natave to (England) Worcester Warriors
- (Fiji) Caleb Muntz to (France) Provence
- (Fiji) Tevita Ikanivere to (Japan) Mie Honda Heat
- (Fiji) Vuate Karawalevu to (France) Castres
- (Fiji) Leone Rotuisolia to (France) Oyonnax
- (Fiji) Leone Nawai to (New Zealand) Taranaki

== Force ==
=== Players in ===
- (Argentina) Franco Molina from (England) Exeter Chiefs
- (Australia) Nathan Hastie from (New Zealand) Highlanders
- (New Zealand) George Bridge from (France) Montpellier
- (Tonga) Feao Fotuaika from (Australia) ACT Brumbies
- (Australia) Darby Lancaster from (Australia) NSW Waratahs
- (New Zealand) Sef Fa'agase from (Australia) Queensland Reds
- (Argentina) Agustín Moyano from (Argentina) Dogos XV
- (Argentina) Leonel Oviedo from (Argentina) Dogos XV

=== Players out ===
- (Australia) Sam Carter (retired)
- (Australia) Harry Potter to (Australia) NSW Waratahs
- (Australia) Issak Fines-Leleiwasa to (Fiji) Fijian Drua
- (New Zealand) Sio Tomkinson to (France) Agen
- (Fiji) Josh Thompson to (France) Grenoble
- (New Zealand) Ryan Coxon to (New Zealand) Tasman
- (Australia) Reed Prinsep (retired)
- (Australia) George Poolman to (Australia) NSW Waratahs
- (Australia) Reesjan Pasitoa to (New Zealand) Highlanders
- (Australia) Tiaan Tauakipulu (retired)
- (Australia) Nic White (retired)
- (New Zealand) Coby Miln to (United States) California Legion

== Highlanders ==
=== Players in ===
- (New Zealand) Angus Taʻavao from (New Zealand) Blues
- (Argentina) Tomás Lavanini from (France) Lyon
- (Australia) Reesjan Pasitoa from (Australia) Western Force
- (New Zealand) Lucas Casey from (New Zealand) Otago
- (New Zealand) Xavier Tito-Harris from (New Zealand) Auckland
- (New Zealand) Andrew Knewstubb from (New Zealand) Canterbury

=== Players out ===
- (New Zealand) Sam Gilbert to (Ireland) Connacht
- (Australia) Nathan Hastie to (Australia) Western Force
- (New Zealand) Ajay Faleafaga to (Japan) Toyota Industries Corporation Shuttles Aichi
- (New Zealand) Thomas Umaga-Jensen to (Japan) Toyota Industries Corporation Shuttles Aichi

== Hurricanes ==
=== Players in ===
- (New Zealand) Jordie Barrett from (Ireland) Leinster
- (New Zealand) Vernon Bason from (New Zealand) Manawatu
- (Japan) Warner Dearns from (Japan) Toshiba Brave Lupus Tokyo
- (New Zealand) Josh Moorby from (New Zealand) Waikato
- (New Zealand) Josh Timu from (New Zealand) Otago
- (New Zealand) Matolu Petaia from (New Zealand) Wellington

=== Players out ===
- (New Zealand) Peter Umaga-Jensen to (Japan) Hanazono Kintetsu Liners
- (New Zealand) Riley Hohepa to (Japan) Green Rockets Tokatsu
- (New Zealand) Nic Souchon to (New Zealand) Otago
- (New Zealand) Tjay Clarke to (Japan) Toshiba Brave Lupus Tokyo
- (New Zealand) Zach Gallagher to (Japan) Toyota Verblitz

== Moana Pasifika ==
=== Players in ===
- (New Zealand) Jimmy Tupou from (New Zealand) Chiefs
- (Tonga) Tupou Afungia from (United States) New Orleans Gold
- (New Zealand) Alefosio Aho from (Australia) NSW Waratahs
- (New Zealand) Malakai Hala-Ngatai from (New Zealand) Manawatu
- (Japan) Mamoru Harada from (Japan) Toshiba Brave Lupus Tokyo
- (Tonga) Paula Latu from (New Zealand) Southland
- (Tonga) Tevita Latu from (New Zealand) Cantebury
- (New Zealand) Ngani Laumape from (New Zealand) Manawatu
- (New Zealand) Israel Leota from (Australia) Brisbane Broncos
- (Samoa) Faletoi Peni from (United States) New England Free Jacks
- (Tonga) Siaosi Nginingini from (New Zealand) North Harbour
- (Tonga) Augustine Pulu from (Japan) Hino Red Dolphins
- (New Zealand) Dominic Ropeti from (New Zealand) Wellington
- (Australia) Glen Vaihu from (Japan) AZ-COM Maruwa Momotaros
- (Samoa) Lolani Faleiva from (New Zealand) Hawke's Bay
- (Tonga) Veikoso Poloniati from (France) Bayonne
- (New Zealand) Konrad Toleafoa from (New Zealand) Counties Manukau
- (New Zealand) Simon-Peter Toleafoa from (New Zealand) Counties Manukau

=== Players out ===
- (Samoa) Sama Malolo to (France) Perpignan
- (Tonga) Fine Inisi to (Wales) Dragons
- (New Zealand) Ardie Savea to (Japan) Kobelco Kobe Steelers
- (Samoa) Pepesana Patafilo to (Japan) Kyushu Electric Power Kyuden Voltex
- (Samoa) Danny Toala to (France) Oyonnax
- (Tonga) Sione Havili Talitui to (Japan) Shimizu Koto Blue Sharks
- (Tonga) Lotu Inisi to (Japan) Red Hurricanes Osaka
- (Samoa) Alamanda Motuga to (New Zealand) Counties Manukau
- (Tonga) Kyren Taumoefolau to (New Zealand) Chiefs
- (Samoa) Sam Slade to (Japan) Sayama Secom Rugguts
- (Australia) Pone Fa'amausili to (France) Soyaux Angoulême
- (Samoa) James Lay (retired)
- (New Zealand) Sione Mafileo to (France) Montauban

== Reds ==
=== Players in ===
- (Australia) Aidan Ross from (New Zealand) Chiefs
- (Australia) Carter Gordon from (Australia) Gold Coast Titans
- (Australia) Hamish Muller from (Australia) Brothers
- (Fiji) Ben Volavola from (England) Leicester Tigers

=== Players out ===
- (Australia) Ryan Smith to (Wales) Ospreys
- (Australia) Matt Gibbon (retired)
- (Australia) John Bryant to (Italy) Benetton (short-term loan)
- (Australia) Angus Blyth to (Australia) NSW Waratahs
- (Australia) Richie Asiata to (Italy) Benetton (short-term loan)
- (Australia) Louis Werchon to (Italy) Benetton (short-term loan)
- (New Zealand) Sef Fa'agase to (Australia) Western Force
- (Australia) Connor Vest (retired)
- (Australia) Alex Hodgman (retired)
- (Australia) Jude Gibbs to (Japan) Kyushu Electric Power Kyuden Voltex
- (Australia) Theo Fourie to (United States) Chicago Hounds

== Waratahs ==
=== Players in ===
- (Australia) Pete Samu from (France) Bordeaux
- (New Zealand) Ioane Moananu from (New Zealand) Crusaders
- (Australia) Jack Debreczeni from (Australia) ACT Brumbies
- (Australia) Harry Potter from (Australia) Western Force
- (Australia) Angus Blyth from (Australia) Queensland Reds
- (Australia) Folau Fainga'a from (France) Clermont
- (Australia) George Poolman from (Australia) Western Force
- (Australia) Lachlan Hooper from (Australia) ACT Brumbies
- (Australia) Angus Scott-Young from (England) Northampton Saints
- (Australia) Austin Durbridge from (Australia) Sydney University
- (Australia) Will Goddard from (Australia) Eastwood
- (Australia) Lachlan Hooper from (New Zealand) Northland
- (Australia) Leo Jacques from (Australia) Eastern Suburbs
- (Australia) Matt Philip from (Japan) Yokohama Canon Eagles
- (Fiji) Apolosi Ranawai from (Australia) Northern Suburbs

=== Players out ===
- (Australia) Langi Gleeson to (France) Montpellier
- (Australia) Julian Heaven to (England) Exeter Chiefs
- (Australia) Rob Leota to (France) Bayonne
- (Australia) Angus Bell to (Ireland) Ulster (short-term deal)
- (Fiji) Angelo Smith to (Fiji) Fijian Drua
- (Australia) Taniela Tupou to (France) Racing 92
- (Australia) Fergus Lee-Warner to (England) Newcastle Red Bulls
- (Samoa) Brad Amituanai to (France) Narbonne
- (Australia) Tane Edmed to (Australia) ACT Brumbies
- (Australia) Lalakai Foketi to (New Zealand) Chiefs
- (Australia) Darby Lancaster to (Australia) Western Force
- (Australia) Mahe Vailanu to (Japan) Shimizu Koto Blue Sharks
- (Australia) Henry O'Donnell (sabbatical)

== See also ==
- List of 2025–26 Premiership Rugby transfers
- List of 2025–26 United Rugby Championship transfers
- List of 2025–26 Champ Rugby transfers
- List of 2025–26 Top 14 transfers
- List of 2025–26 Rugby Pro D2 transfers
- List of 2025–26 Major League Rugby transfers
- SANZAAR
- Super Rugby franchise areas
