= Tarek Haffar =

English rugby union player

- Born: 13 September 2001 (age 25) Chelsea, London, England
- Height: 1.83 m (6 ft 0 in)
- Weight: 115 kg (18 st 2 lb; 254 lb)
- School: Gunnersbury Boys' School

Rugby union career
- Position: Prop
- Current team: Leicester Tigers
Senior career
Years	Team	Apps	(Points)
2022–2023	London Irish	10	(5)
2023–2025	Northampton Saints	29	(15)
2025–	Leicester Tigers	26	(5)
- Correct as of 16 November 2026
International career
Years	Team	Apps	(Points)
2019	England U18	3	(0)
2021	England U20	3	(0)
2024–	England A	4	(0)
- Correct as of 22 November 2025

Tarek Haffar (born 13 September 2001) is an English professional rugby union player who plays as a loose-head prop for Premiership Rugby club Leicester Tigers.

He has previously played for London Irish and Northampton Saints.

== Early life ==
Haffar was born in West London to parents from Ghana and Lebanon. He played much of his junior rugby as a back row forward before moving to loose-head prop in the front row.

Haffar attended Gunnersbury Boys' School in Brentford, and played for club side Grasshoppers RFC. He joined the London Irish Academy set-up at the age of fourteen.

== Club career ==
Haffar made his debut for London Irish against Harlequins in September 2022 and went on to make ten appearances in total during the 2022-23 season. He scored his first try in the Premiership against Sale Sharks in March 2023. A week later he was a second-half substitute as they lost to Exeter Chiefs after extra time in the final of the Premiership Rugby Cup.

In the summer of 2023 London Irish encountered financial issues and it was announced that Haffar had joined Northampton Saints. He made his debut for Northampton in the European Champions Cup against Glasgow Warriors in December 2023.

On 13 May 2025 Leicester Tigers announced Haffar's signing for the 2024–2025 season. He was a try-scorer on 15 March 2026, as Leicester defeated Exeter Chiefs in the final of the 2025–26 PREM Rugby Cup.

== International career ==
In August 2019 Haffar represented England under-18. He was a member of the England U20 squad which completed a junior grand slam during the 2021 Six Nations Under 20s Championship. In February 2024 Haffar played for the England A side against Portugal. He was selected for the England A squad again in November 2025.
