= Ollie Stonham =

English rugby union player

- Born: Oliver Stonham; 16 February 2001 (age 25)
- Height: 1.93 m (6 ft 4 in)
- Weight: 112 kg (17 st 9 lb)
- School: Felsted School

Rugby union career
- Position(s): Flanker, Lock
- Current team: Kubota Spears
Senior career
Years	Team	Apps	(Points)
2019–2024	Saracens	5	(0)
2020–2022	→ Ampthill (loan)	9	(0)
2024–	Kubota Spears	0	(0)
- Correct as of 6 September 2022
International career
Years	Team	Apps	(Points)
2021	England U20s	3	(0)
- Correct as of 6 September 2022

Oliver Stonham (born 16 February 2001) is an English professional rugby union player, who currently plays as a flanker for Kubota Spears.

== Early life ==
Stonham attended Felsted School in Essex – the same school as future teammate and fellow Saracens academy graduate Max Malins – but did not play junior club rugby. He was a keen hockey player as a youngster and represented England at junior level, while rugby was his second sport. However, he gradually focused more on rugby, becoming the captain of his school's first team, before joining the Saracens academy.

== Rugby career ==
Stonham was recruited into the Saracens junior academy at the age of 16, and later graduated into the senior academy in June 2019. He made his Premiership debut in December that year, in a victory over Worcester. Subsequently, he featured in the Premiership Rugby Cup, whilst also spending time out on loan with Ampthill in the Championship. Prior to the 2022–23 season, Stonham was promoted into the Saracens first-team squad.

Stonham has represented England at age-group level. He featured for the England U18s in 2019. Two years later, he made three appearances for England U20s during their Grand Slam-winning campaign in the 2021 Six Nations.
