= Jack Innard =

English rugby union player (born 1995)

- Born: Jack Oliver J. Innard; 3 July 1995 (age 31) Truro, Cornwall, England
- Height: 1.80 m (5 ft 11 in)
- Weight: 103 kg (227 lb; 16 st 3 lb)
- School: Truro and Penwith College

Rugby union career
- Position: Hooker
- Current team: Gloucester
Senior career
Years	Team	Apps	(Points)
2013–2025	Exeter Chiefs	83	(65)
2014–2015	→ Launceston (loan)	6	(0)
2014–2017	→ Cornish Pirates (loan)	39	(20)
2017–2018	→ Plymouth Albion (loan)	2	(0)
2025–	Gloucester	21	(10)
- Correct as of 21 Oct 2026
International career
Years	Team	Apps	(Points)
2015	England U20s	8	(0)
- Correct as of 5 Dec 2025

Jack Innard (born 3 July 1995) is a professional rugby union player who plays hooker for Premiership Rugby club Gloucester Rugby having previously played for Exeter Chiefs.

== Club career ==
Innard plays as a hooker. He spent the early part of his career on dual-registration with Cornish Pirates and Exeter Chiefs. He also played for Plymouth Albion at the start of the 2017–18 season.

On 30 March 2018 he scored two tries in the final of the Anglo-Welsh Cup as Exeter beat Bath to lift the trophy.

A suspension for Jack Yeandle and an England call-up for Tom Cowan-Dickie gave him increased first team opportunities in March 2021. He made his debut in the European Rugby Champions Cup on 15 January 2022 against Glasgow Warriors.

Innard scored a try in the 2022–23 Premiership Rugby Cup final as Exeter defeated London Irish in extra time to win the competition.

His appearances for Exeter during the 2024–25 season included a try-scoring appearance against Saracens in January 2025.

In March 2025, Gloucester Rugby director of rugby George Skivington and Exeter Chiefs director of Rugby Rob Baxter were both reported in the media as saying that Innard would join Gloucester from the 2025–26 season. He made his Prem Rugby debut for Gloucester as a starter against Sale Sharks on 25 September 2025.

== International career ==
Innard was a member of the England U20 side that won the 2015 Six Nations Under 20s Championship. Later that year he was included in the squad for the 2015 World Rugby Under 20 Championship and came off the bench in the final as England were defeated by New Zealand to finish runners up.

== Personal life ==
Innard was born in Truro, Cornwall. He is eligible to play for Wales through ancestry and has been linked with a move to a Welsh region.

== Honours ==
Exeter

- Anglo-Welsh Cup: 2017–18
- Premiership Rugby Cup: 2022–23

England U20

- Six Nations Under 20s Championship: 2015
- World Rugby U20 Championship runner up: 2015
