= Andrew Turner (rugby union, born 2002) =

English rugby union player

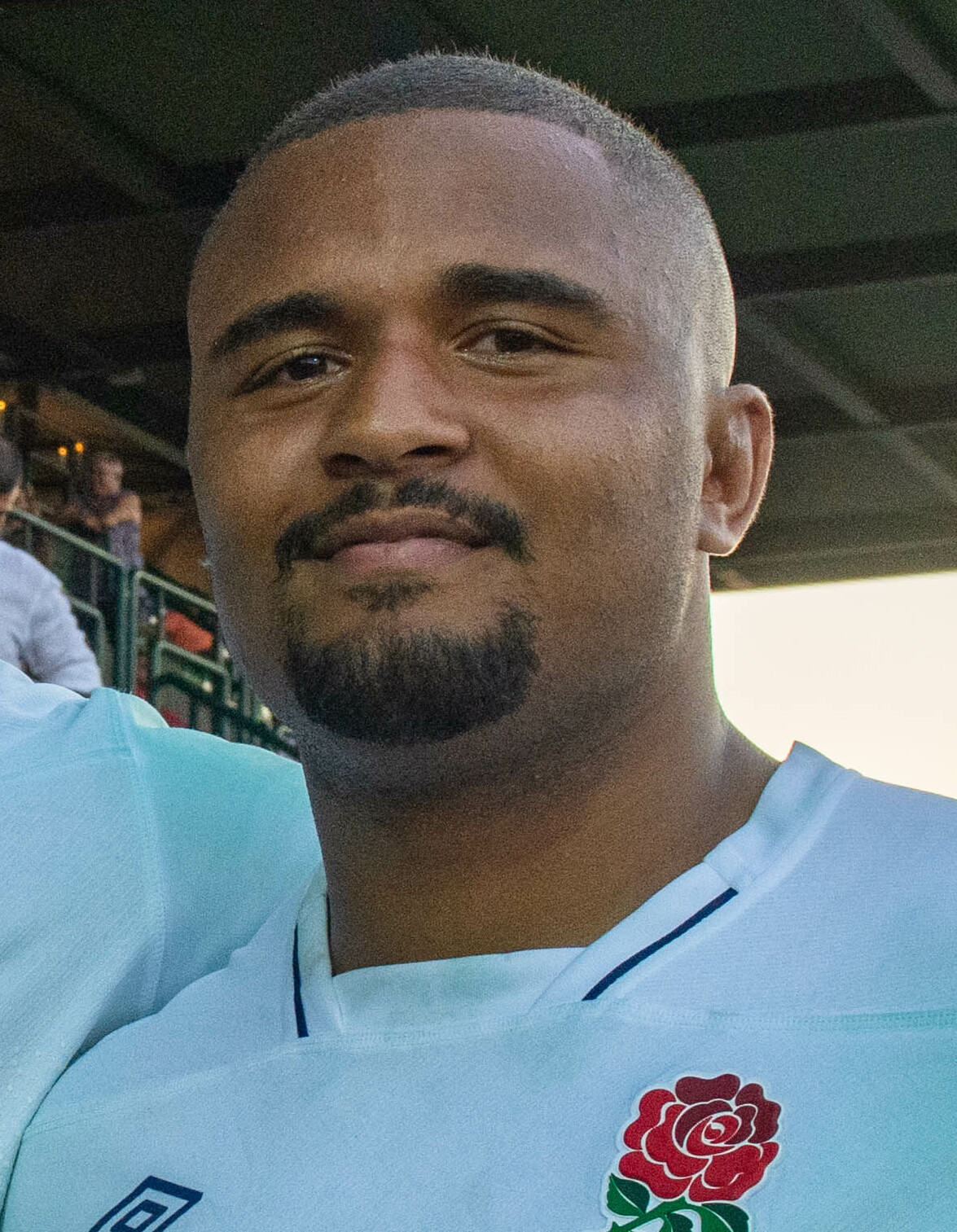
- Born: 16 February 2002 (age 24) Somerset, England
- Height: 183 cm (6 ft 0 in)
- Weight: 115 kg (254 lb; 18 st 2 lb)
- School: SGS Filton College

Rugby union career
- Position: Prop
- Current team: Bristol Bears
Senior career
Years	Team	Apps	(Points)
2021–	Bristol Bears	10	(0)
2023	→ Crusaders (loan)	2	(0)
2024–2025	→ Doncaster Knights (loan)	0	(0)
- Correct as of 22 July 2024
International career
Years	Team	Apps	(Points)
2022	England U20	3	(0)
- Correct as of 29 May 2023

Andrew Turner (born 16 February 2002) is an English professional rugby union player who plays as a prop for Bristol Bears.

== Early career ==
Turner attended Filton College and played for Weston-super-Mare RFC before joining the Bristol Bears academy.

== Professional career ==
Turner joined the Bristol Bears academy in 2020. He made his club debut in the 2021–22 Premiership Rugby Cup against Worcester Warriors, before making a further two appearances in the 2022–23 Premiership Rugby Cup. During this period he was dual-registered with Dings Crusaders RFC.

In early 2023, Turner moved to New Zealand to represent Sumner RFC, who have a partnership with Bristol Bears. Due to an injury crisis at the Crusaders, Turner was a late inclusion in their side for Round 11 of the 2023 Super Rugby Pacific season against the Force, making his debut as a substitute in the same fixture. He made a second and last appearance in round 13 against Moana Pasifika.

In June 2022 Turner represented England U20 and received a red card against France.

On 28 June 2024, Turner would join Championship side Doncaster Knights on a season-long loan for the 2024–25 season for further game development.
