= Charlie Titcombe =

English rugby union player (born 2001)

- Born: 28 December 2001 (age 24) Swindon, England
- Height: 179 cm (5 ft 10 in)
- Weight: 86 kg (190 lb)
- School: Oakham School
- University: Loughborough University

Rugby union career
- Position(s): Flyhalf, Fullback
- Current team: Leicester Tigers
Youth career
- 20??-2020: Leicester Tigers
- 2020-2023: Loughborough University
Senior career
| Years | Team | Apps | (Points) |
| 2021-2023 | Worcester Warriors | 2 | (6) |
| 2021-2022 | → Loughborough Students (loan) | 4 | (28) |
| 2023-2025 | Scarlets | 9 | (2) |
| 2023-2024 | → Carmarthen Quins (loan) | 6 | (38) |
| 2025– | Leicester Tigers | 6 | (9) |
| 2025–2026 | → Mitsubishi Dynaboars (loan) | 4 | (12) |
- Correct as of 31 May 2026
International career
| Years | Team | Apps | (Points) |
| 2022-2023 | England Students | 2 | (21) |
- Correct as of 20 March 2024

Charlie Titcombe (born 28 December 2001) is an English rugby union player who plays as a Flyhalf for Premiership Rugby side Leicester Tigers. He previously played for the Scarlets in the United Rugby Championship.

== Club career ==
=== Youth ===
Titcombe played in the Leicester Tigers academy being released at 18, moving to Loughborough University playing in the BUCS Super Rugby, winning the league in 2022–23. Titcombe was named as player as the tournament.

=== Worcester Warriors ===
He began playing for Worcester in 2021, making his debut in the 2021-22 Premiership Rugby Cup against Gloucester, coming off the bench in a 27–21 win. His only other appearance for Worcester before their collapse came in the 2022-23 Premiership Rugby Cup once again against Gloucester this time starting at Flyhalf in a 49–21 loss against the Cherry and Whites. While at Worcester he played on loan for Loughborough Students RUFC in National League 2 North.

=== Scarlets ===
He joined the Scarlets in 2023, his first appearance coming in the 1st Round of the 2023-24 United Rugby Championship against Bulls. His first start coming in the 5th Round of the championship, a 54–5 loss against Leinster. While at the Scarlets he has featured on loan for Carmarthen Quins.

=== Leicester Tigers ===
On 13 May 2025, Titcombe would re-sign with his hometown club Leicester Tigers on a professional deal back in the Premiership Rugby from the 2025-26 season.

== International career ==
He made his debut for England Students in 2022 playing against France Universities, his second cap came in the 2023 edition of Le Crunch Universitaire with England winning 25–21 against France Universities. He started at fullback in the first win away over the French side in 17 years.

== Honours ==
=== Loughborough University ===
- BUCS Super Rugby: 2022-23 (champions)

=== Worcester Warriors ===
- Premiership Rugby Cup: 2021-22 (champions)

=== Individual ===
- BUCS Super Rugby Team of the Tournament: 2021–22, 2022-23
- BUCS Super Rugby Player of the Tournament: 2022–23
