= Morgan Nelson =

English rugby union player (born 1999)

- Born: Morgan Nelson; 26 October 1999 (age 27) Ross-on-Wye, Herefordshire, England
- Height: 1.80 m (5 ft 11 in)
- Weight: 108 kg (17 st 0 lb)
- School: John Kyrle High School; Hartpury College
- University: Cardiff Metropolitan University

Rugby union career
- Position: Hooker
- Current team: Cornish Pirates
Amateur team(s)
Years	Team	Apps	(Points)
- Ledbury
- Hereford
2018–2021	Cardiff Metropolitan University		
Senior career
Years	Team	Apps	(Points)
2022–2024	Cornish Pirates	49	(130)
2024–2025	Gloucester	8	(5)
2025–	Cornish Pirates	0	(0)
- Correct as of 4 November 2024
International career
Years	Team	Apps	(Points)
2017	Wales U18s	8	(5)
- Correct as of 4 November 2024

Morgan Nelson (born 26 October 1999) is a Welsh rugby union player who plays for Cornish Pirates in the RFU Championship.

== Career ==
Nelson played junior rugby at Ledbury and then Hereford, whilst attending John Kyrle High School and then Hartpury College, all whilst rising through the ranks of the Gloucester academy, playing alongside the likes of Jack Reeves and Jack Clement.

He left the academy to join Cardiff Metropolitan University for the BUCS Super Rugby competition whilst gained a degree in Sports Coaching and Physical Education and the WRU National Championship for the Archers. Nelson left Wales as he signed for Cornish Pirates in the RFU Championship from the 2022–23 season.

On 23 October 2024, Nelson left the Pirates with immediate effect to sign for boyhood club Gloucester in the Premiership from the 2024–25 season. On 13 May 2025, Nelson would return to his old club Cornish Pirates in the RFU Championship after a season at Gloucester, for the 2025-26 season.
