= Doncaster Knights =

Rugby union club in South Yorkshire, England

(England) Doncaster Knights
- Full name: Doncaster Knights Rugby Football Club
- Union: Yorkshire RFU
- Nickname: Knights
- Founded: 1875; 151 years ago
- Location: Doncaster, South Yorkshire, England
- Ground: Castle Park (Capacity: 5,183 (1,926 seats) (Note: Ground capacity of Castle Park up from 5,000 (1,650 seats) to 5,183 (1,926 seats) for the 2022–23 season.))
- Director of Rugby: Ian McGeechan
- Coach: Darren Fearn
- League: Champ Rugby
- 2025–26: 8th of 14
1st kit	2nd kit

Official website
- drfc.co.uk

Doncaster Knights Rugby Football Club (formerly, Doncaster RFC) are a professional rugby union club representing the city of Doncaster, England. The club play in the 2nd division of English rugby, Champ Rugby. Being the most promoted side in English history has led to huge changes at the Castle Park ground and within the team structure.

Castle Park Conference and Function centre is a multimillion-pound development and is among the top conference venues in Doncaster, while remaining a supportive place for amateur rugby union in the city. The club motto "rugby for all" sees amateur side Doncaster Phoenix compete at the same ground, as well as the ladies side Doncaster Demons and every age group from under-7 to under-17s.

== History ==
The rise to National League One, from amateur status led to the rebranding of Doncaster RFC to Doncaster Knights for the 2006–07 season, and that season saw their highest placed finish to date under Clive Griffiths as Director of Rugby. In the same season, Doncaster also won the Yorkshire Cup.

After the departure of Griffiths to Worcester, the former Director of Rugby, Lynn Howells joined the club on the eve of the 2007–08 season. Justin Bishop, signed from London Irish, had acted as DOR during the pre-season.

Howells inspired the Knights to almost repeat the 3rd-place finish in his first season in charge, and has moulded the squad in his own image for the 2008–09 season. 9 January saw the opening of the new De Mulder-Lloyd Stand at Castle park, a £3 million state of the art 1650 seater stand. Driven by CEO James Criddle and funded by Tony De Mulder and Steve Lloyd this has seen Castle Park develop into undoubtedly the best rugby facility in South Yorkshire.

The home of the Knights, Castle Park, featured in and won "4 Weddings" and also hosted the Northern BBC TV news coverage for Remembrance Day during 2009 showing how far the operational side of the club has come supporting the on the pitch success.

The 2009–10 season saw the squad decimated by injuries, with no fewer than 15 unavailable players at one stage from a squad of 32. Despite this, and playing nine games in 27 days (of which they won eight) the Knights managed the semi-final of the British and Irish Cup and a promotion play-off finish. The result of the season being the defeat of Bristol at Castle Park, who like Leeds Carnegie before them underestimated the Knights as home.

The 2010–11 and 2011–12 seasons were very average seasons with the Knights managing mid table status and avoiding the relegation playoffs with a reduction in playing budget meaning a shuffling of the pack which saw several long serving players move on to other clubs. The captures of the likes of Tristan Roberts and Paul Devlin hinted at a more creative side than the powerhouse forward game Doncaster are known for traditionally.

The 2012–13 season saw the Knights have a disappointing season with only three wins and a draw out of twenty two league matches and two wins from six in the British and Irish Cup competition which resulted in relegation (for the first time in Doncaster history) back to National League 1. One of the few highlights being a win over local rivals Leeds Carnegie 23–17 in February 2013.

For the 2013–14 season DOR Clive Griffiths signed a variety of new and returning players including Mat Clark, Paul Jarvis, Bevon Armitage, Roberto Santamaria and Bruno Bravo who would all feature as regulars in the coming season. The season looked to begin badly for the Knights as they were once again plagued by injuries particularly in the forwards but still with an intention to be the first team to secure promotion back to the Championship at the first time of asking. The Knights started strongly recording seven straight wins before losing away to Henley Hawks 11–10 in a close fought game. The Knights campaign continued strongly at home although with away losses to Blaydon and Wharfedale they could not fully pull away from the following pack. With further signings during the year, such as former British Lion Darren Morris, London Irish back row Danny Kenny, Argentinian-Italian prop Santiago Sodini and the return of former Knight Richard List from RC Narbonne to bolster the injury prone team, the Knights continued to be the team to beat having been top of the table for the majority of the season.

In late March 2014 with only four games left to play of the season there were only two teams (Rosslyn Park & the Knights) left with the potential to win the league and with them due to meet on 29 March many believed that this could be the most important match of the season. The game resulted in a win for Rosslyn Park and meant the Knights would need to win all three of their remaining matches to guarantee promotion. With a win over Wharfedale (57–17) at home to secure a 100% home win record for the season followed by away wins against Coventry (17–18) & Blackheath (20–38) the Knights secured promotion back to the Championship despite having lost one more game than Rosslyn Park (having achieved more bonus points to be three points clear).

During the 2013–14 season Tyson Lewis was the top try scorer for National League 1 with 22 tries and his teammate Mat Clark was equal second on 20 tries. Tyson also achieved Guinness World Record fame for "The fastest time to score a try in a rugby union match". The try was scored direct from the opening kick off in 7.24 seconds (Doncaster Knights vs Old Albanians at Wollam Playing Fields, St Albans, UK, on 23 November 2013).

== Honours ==
Doncaster Knights

- Yorkshire Cup winners (4): 1999, 2000, 2007, 2008
- North East 2 champions: 1992–93
- North East 1 champions: 1993–94
- North Division 2 champions: 1996–97
- North Division 1 champions: 1998–99
- National League 3 North champions: 2001–02
- National League 1 (formerly National Division 2) champions (2): 2004–05, 2013–14

- British and Irish Cup: runner-up 2014–15
- Championship: runner-up 2015–16

Doncaster Phoenix (amateur side)

- Yorkshire 6 champions: 1999–00
- Yorkshire 1 champions: 2014–15
- North 1 East champions: 2015–16

== Current standings ==
2026–27 Champ Rugby table
Pos	Team	Pld	W	D	L	PF	PA	PD	TF	TA	TB	LB	Pts	Qualification
1	Worcester Warriors	6	6	0	0	277	114	+163	42	17	4	0	28	Play-off semi-finals
2	Ealing Trailfinders	6	5	0	1	287	135	+152	45	20	5	1	26	Play-off semi-finals
3	Coventry	6	5	0	1	278	188	+90	41	29	2	1	23	Play-off quarter-finals
4	Cornish Pirates	6	4	0	2	222	208	+14	33	31	3	0	19	Play-off quarter-finals
5	Chinnor	6	4	0	2	201	200	+1	31	31	1	0	17	Play-off quarter-finals
6	Rotherham Titans	6	4	0	2	181	231	−50	28	35	1	0	17	Play-off quarter-finals
7	Ampthill	6	4	0	2	210	228	−18	32	34	0	0	16	
8	Bedford Blues	6	3	0	3	188	179	+9	29	27	3	1	16	
9	Doncaster Knights	6	2	0	4	187	197	−10	28	28	1	2	11	
10	Caldy	6	1	0	5	203	239	−36	31	36	0	3	7	
11	Blackheath	6	1	0	5	165	220	−55	23	32	0	3	7	
12	Nottingham	6	1	0	5	145	227	−82	22	35	0	2	6	Relegation play-off
13	Richmond	6	1	0	5	158	221	−63	24	35	0	1	5	Relegation play-off
14	Hartpury	6	1	0	5	137	252	−115	24	35	0	1	5	Relegated

Updated to match(es) played on 1 November 2026. Source:
Rules for classification: If teams are level at any stage, tiebreakers are applied in the following order:
1. Number of matches won
2. Number of matches drawn
3. Difference between points for and against
4. Total number of points for
5. Aggregate number of points scored in matches between tied teams
6. Number of matches won excluding the first match, then the second and so on until the tie is settled

== Current squad ==
The Doncaster Knights squad for the 2025–26 season is:

Doncaster Knights 2025–26 Champ Rugby squad
**Props**: (Australia) Conor Davidson; (Wales) Joe Jones; (England) Jasper McGuire; (Canada) **Cole Keith**; (Samoa) **Logovi'i Mulipola**; (England) Lewis Thiede; (England) Andrew Turner; **Hookers**: (England) Ben Chapman; (England) Fred Davies; **Locks**: (England) Ehize Ehizode; (Wales) Morgan Jones; (Wales) Ben Murphy; (England) Josh Williams	**Back row**: (England) Josh Bainbridge; (England) Adam Hopkinson; (England) Thom Smith; (Scotland) Rhys Tait; (Samoa) ET Viliamu; **Scrum-halves**: (Australia) Alex Dolly; (England) Oliver Fox; (Fiji) Cameron Nordli-Kelemeti; **Fly-halves**: (England) Russell Bennett; (England) Morgan Bunting	**Centres**: (Wales) Connor Edwards; (Ireland) Zach Kerr; (England) Joe Margetts; (Samoa) Junior Nu'u; **Wings**: (Scotland) Aidan Cross; (Zimbabwe) **Matthew McNab**; (England) Ryan Olowofela; (England) **Semesa Rokoduguni**; **Fullbacks**: (England) Jordan Olowofela; (Tonga) **Telusa Veainu**
**(c)** denotes the team captain. (vc) denotes vice-captain. **Bold** denotes internationally capped players.^{ST} denotes a short-term signing. Source:

== Past performance ==
Year	Tier	Division	P	W	D	L	PF	PA	PD	TB	LB	Pts	Notes
2025-26	2	Champ Rugby*	26*										
2024-25	2	English Championship	22	15	0	7	662	479	+183	13	3	76	Finished 3rd
2023–24	2	English Championship	20*	11	1	8	509	529	-20	9	2	57	Finished 6th
2022–23	2	English Championship	22	10	0	12	565	583	-18	9	3	52	Finished 6th
2021–22	2	English Championship	20*	17	0	3	524	322	202	9	0	77	Finished 2nd
2020–21	2	English Championship	10*	8	0	2	236	225	11	4	0	36	Finished 3rd
2019–20	2	English Championship	15*	6	0	9	268	351	-83	3	1	28	Finished 10th on 36.84pts*
2018–19	2	English Championship	22	8	0	14	546	617	-71	6	4	42	Finished 10th
2017–18	2	English Championship	22	9	1	12	582	615	-33	13	6	57	Finished 7th
2016–17	2	English Championship	20*	12	0	8	514	424	90	9	1	58	Finished 4th
2015–16	2	English Championship	22	15	2	5	588	470	118	10	5	79	Finished 2nd
2014–15	2	English Championship	22	8	1	13	429	481	−52	3	6	43	Finished 9th
2013–14	3	National League 1	30	25	0	5	943	487	456	18	4	122	Promoted to Championship as champions
2012–13	2	English Championship	22	3	1	18	364	592	−228	2	7	23	Relegated to National League 1
2011–12	2	English Championship	22	9	2	11	467	524	−57	7	3	50	
2010–11	2	English Championship	22	9	0	13	572	576	−4	7	8	51	
2009–10	2	English Championship	22	10	0	12	394	386	8	2	6	48	
2008–09	2	National 1	30	21	2	7	895	571	324	14	3	105	
2007–08	2	National 1	30	21	0	9	796	551	245	12	2	98	
2006–07	2	National 1	30	22	1	7	855	474	381	16	4	110	1st Season as Doncaster Knights
2005–06	2	National 1	26	10	1	15	555	699	−144	5	5	52	
2004–05	3	National 2	26	23	1	2	818	379	439	11	1	106	Promoted to National 1 as champions
2003–04	3	National 2	26	17	0	9	692	487	205	–	–	34	
2002–03	3	National 2	26	14	0	12	630	551	79	–	–	28	
2001–02	4	National 3 North	26	25	0	1	1074	357	717	–	–	50	Promoted to National 2 as champions
2000–01	4	National 3 North	23	16	1	6	584	364	220	–	–	33	
1999–2000	4	National 2 North	26	12	2	12	656	539	117	–	–	26	
1998–99	5	North 1	22	18	1	3	550	214	336	–	–	37	Promoted to National 2 North as champions
1997–98	5	North 1	22	17	2	3	489	285	204	–	–	36	
1996–97	6	North 2	22	22	0	0	690	259	431	–	–	44	Promoted to North 1 as champions
1995–96	6	North 2	12	4	2	6	183	168	15	–	–	10	
1994–95	6	North 2	12	7	0	5	136	155	−19	–	–	14	
1993–94	7	North East 1	12	11	0	1	232	70	162	–	–	22	Promoted to North 2
1992–93	8	North East 2	12	11	0	1	294	39	255	–	–	22	Promoted to North East 1
1991–92													
1990–91													
1989–90													
1988–89													
1987–88	10	Yorkshire 2											

- 2016–17 - Season shortened to 20 games due to London Welsh going into liquidation and being removed from the league by the RFU.
- 2019–20 - Season cut short due to Covid pandemic and final positions were determined by a best playing record formulae. Doncaster were 9th on 28pts when season was suspended but finished 10th on 36.84pts after formula was applied and a 5pt deduction imposed for use of an unregistered agent.
- 2020–21 - Season was truncated due to ongoing pandemic and teams only played each other once either home or away. London Scottish declined to participate due to pandemic costs so only 11 teams took part.
- 2021–22 - Due to Saracens being promoted but no team being relegated from the Premiership the league consisted of 11 teams.
- 2023–24 - Due to the financial collapse of Jersey Reds early in the season, the league was reduced to 11 and therefore, no promotion or demotion would occur. Chinnor RFC were promoted from National 1 and will play in the 2024–25 season.
- 2025-26 - The league was rebranded as Champ Rugby and expanded to 14 teams with 2024–25 National League 1 winners Richmond joining the competition alongside newly reestablished Worcester Warriors
