= Alfie Petch =

English rugby union player (born 1999)

- Born: Alfie Petch; 21 December 1999 (age 26) Truro, Cornwall, England
- Height: 1.88 m (6 ft 2 in)
- Weight: 137 kg (21 st 8 lb)
- School: Ivybridge Community College

Rugby union career
- Position: Tighthead Prop
- Current team: Cornish Pirates
Amateur team(s)
Years	Team	Apps	(Points)
- Bude RFC
Senior career
Years	Team	Apps	(Points)
2018–2022	Exeter Chiefs	7	(0)
2021–2022	→ Cornish Pirates (loan)	22	(0)
2022–2023	Northampton Saints	21	(0)
2023–2024	Biarritz	17	(0)
2024–2025	Gloucester	8	(0)
2025–	Cornish Pirates	0	(0)
- Correct as of 24 July 2024
International career
Years	Team	Apps	(Points)
2017	England U17s		
2018-2019	England U18s		
2019-2020	England U20s	7	(0)
- Correct as of 23 February 2024

Alfie Petch (born 21 December 1999) is an English rugby union player.

Petch quickly risen through the ranks of rugby since joining Bude RFC at the age of 14. Recognizing his potential, he was signed by the Exeter Chiefs Academy, where he has been honing his skills and development as a player. He represented England Under 17s in France in 2017.

On 11 April 2018, Petch signed his first professional contract with Exeter from the 2018–19 season where he continues to train and play alongside some of England's best talents. Petch played for England U20s in both the 2019 Six Nations Under 20s Championship and 2019 World Rugby Under 20 Championship held in Argentina during the 2018-19 campaign. He was dual registered with Cornish Pirates in the RFU Championship for the 2021–22 season.

On 31 May 2022, he signed with Premiership rivals Northampton Saints for the 2022–23 season. On 4 October 2023, Petch moved to France to join Biarritz as a medical joker in the Rugby Pro D2 for the 2023–24 season.

On 12 June 2024, Petch returns to the Premiership in England as he signs for Gloucester for the 2024–25 season.

On 27 May 2025, Petch would return to Cornish Pirates on a permanent deal in the RFU Championship for the 2025-26 season.
