= John Stewart (rugby union, born 2002) =

English rugby union player (born 2002)

- Born: 8 March 2002 (age 24)
- Height: 1.87 m (6 ft 2 in)
- Weight: 110 kg (240 lb; 17 st 5 lb)
- School: Beechen Cliff School

Rugby union career
- Position: Hooker
Senior career
Years	Team	Apps	(Points)
2020–2025	Bath	14	(15)
2025	Leicester Tigers	1	(0)
- Correct as of 31 October 2025
International career
Years	Team	Apps	(Points)
2018	England U18s		
2022-2023	England U20s		

John Stewart (born 8 March 2002) is an English rugby union player who plays hooker.

== Early life ==
From Dorchester, Dorset he played junior rugby at Dorchester RFC and also played cricket for Martinstown Cricket Club. He attended Beechen Cliff School in Bath, Somerset and joined the Bath Rugby Academy at U14 level.

== Career ==
After coming through the Bath Rugby Academy he made his debut for the club in November 2021 in the Premiership Rugby Cup. The following year he made his first start for the club against Worcester Warriors. He made his Premiership Rugby debut in December 2023 against Leicester Tigers. After making eight further league appearances for the club he signed a new contract in March 2024. In June 2025, Stewart signed for Leicester Tigers, subsequently making a single appearance before leaving at end of the season.

== International career ==
He played for England at U18 level, making did debut in 2018. He was called up for the England national under-20 rugby union team in June 2021. He was a member of the side that played in the 2022 U20 Six Nations Championship.
