= Josh Thomas (rugby union) =

Welsh rugby union player

- Born: 30 June 2000 (age 26) Wales
- Height: 178 cm (5 ft 10 in)
- Weight: 82 kg (181 lb; 12 st 13 lb)

Rugby union career
- Position: Fly-half / Fullback
- Current team: Newcastle Falcons
Senior career
Years	Team	Apps	(Points)
2020–2022	Ospreys	23	(0)
2022–	Newcastle Falcons		

Josh Thomas (born 30 June 2000) is a Welsh rugby union player. He signed a development contract with the Ospreys ahead of the 2018–19 season.

Thomas made his debut for the Ospreys in 2020 against the Dragons having previously played for the Ospreys academy.

He signed for Newcastle Falcons in May 2022 on a two-year deal. He left the club in 2024.
