= Josh Caulfield =

English rugby union player

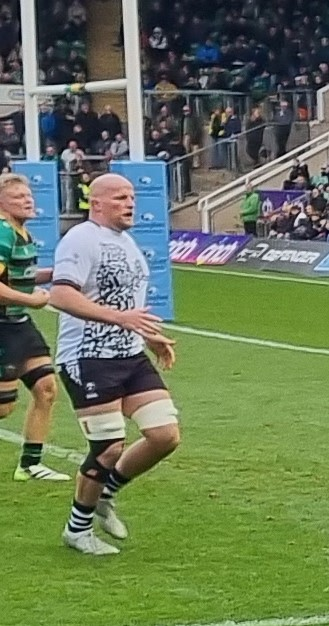
- Caulfield at the 2023-24 English Premiership Northampton Saints vs Bristol Bears
- Born: Josh Caulfield; 9 June 1997 (age 29) Taunton, England
- Height: 1.93 m (6 ft 4 in)
- Weight: 116 kg (18 st 4 lb; 256 lb)

Rugby union career
- Position: Lock
- Current team: Bristol Bears
Senior career
Years	Team	Apps	(Points)
2016–2022	Cornish Pirates	100	(25)
2016–2020	Exeter Chiefs	8	(0)
2020	→ Wasps (loan)	1	(0)
2022–2023	London Irish	16	(0)
2023–2025	Bristol Bears	28	(15)
2025-2026	Ealing Trailfinders		
International career
Years	Team	Apps	(Points)
2015	England U18	5	(10)
2017	England U20	8	(0)
- Correct as of 18 June 2017

Josh Caulfield (born 9 June 1997) is an English professional rugby union player who plays in the second row for Bristol Bears.

== Career ==
In March 2015, Caulfield represented England Under-18. He was part of the successful England U20 side that completed a 'grand slam' during the 2017 Six Nations Under 20s Championship. Later that year, Caulfield was a member of the England U20 squad at the 2017 World Rugby Under 20 Championship and started in the final which saw England lose against New Zealand U20 to finish runners-up.

Caulfield started out in club rugby playing for his hometown club Taunton Titans, but would go on to begin his professional career with Exeter Chiefs. He made his first appearance for Exeter in an Anglo-Welsh Cup fixture against Cardiff Blues in November 2016. After being dual-registered with Cornish Pirates for four seasons, Caulfield made a permanent transfer to the Pirates in May 2020. Later that year he spent time on loan with Wasps RFC.

In June 2022, having made more than 100 appearances for Cornish Pirates it was announced that Caulfield would leave the club to join Rugby Premiership club London Irish. He started in the 2022–23 Premiership Rugby Cup final which they lost against Exeter to finish runners-up.

At the end of the 2022-23 season, London Irish entered administration. In June 2023, it was confirmed that Caulfield had signed a contract to play for Rugby Premiership club Bristol Bears. He made his debut for Bristol Bears on 9 September 2023, in the Premiership Rugby Cup away against his former club Exeter Chiefs. After 36 appearances he left Bristol in May 2025.

He joined Ealing Trailfinders ahead of the 2025-26 season.

== Personal life ==
His brother, Jake Caulfield, was also a professional rugby union player and played for Bath Rugby and Ulster Rugby.
