= Jack Dunne (rugby union) =

Irish rugby union player

- Born: 21 November 1998 (age 27) London, United Kingdom
- Height: 2.03 m (6 ft 8 in)
- Weight: 120 kg (19 st; 260 lb)
- School: CBS St Michael's College
- University: Trinity College Dublin

Rugby union career
- Position: Lock
- Current team: Toyota Industries Shuttles
Amateur team(s)
Years	Team	Apps	(Points)
2017–2022	Dublin University		
Senior career
Years	Team	Apps	(Points)
2019–2022	Leinster	20	(0)
2022–2025	Exeter Chiefs	41	(5)
2025–	Toyota Industries Shuttles	8	(0)
- Correct as of 30 Apr 2022
International career
Years	Team	Apps	(Points)
2018	Ireland U20	10	(0)
- Correct as of 6 April 2019

Jack Dunne is an Irish rugby union player who plays for Toyota Industries Shuttles, in the Japanese Top League. He previously played for Exeter Chiefs in England's Premiership Rugby and also for Leinster in the URC. He plays as a lock and represented Dublin University in the All-Ireland League. Dunne studied theoretical physics in Trinity College, where he received both a rugby scholarship and the Naughton Scholarship for physics.

== Underage rugby ==
Dunne attended St Michael's College, Dublin and entered the Leinster sub-academy immediately upon leaving school in 2017 before being promoted to the full academy in the Summer of 2018. He was selected for the Ireland U20s in the 2018 Six Nations Under 20s Championship and at the 2018 World Rugby Under 20 Championship. Captained the Seapoint U10s B team in 2008.

== Professional career ==
Dunne was part of the Celtic Cup-winning Leinster 'A' side in 2018 and made his senior Leinster debut in February 2019 in a victory against Zebre. He signed his first professional contract with Leinster for the 2020-21 season

Dunne was selected as an internationally uncapped player in Dave Rennie's Barbarian F.C.'s squad to play Samoa in Twickenham Stadium in November 2021, though the game did not take place due to COVID-19 cases in the Barbarian's camp.

In March 2022 Dunne signed with the Exeter Chiefs for the 2022–23 season.

Dunne was confirmed to be leaving Exeter at the end of the 2024-25 season, much to the disappointment of many Exeter fans. Dunne had become a popular figure and cult hero following his try against Munster in the Champions Cup in December 2023.

In October 2025 Jack was signed by Toyota Industries Shuttles

== Personal life ==
Dunne is bisexual, having been out as such since his teens, but hadn't talked about it in the media until June 2021. Alongside studying theoretical physics in Trinity College Dublin Dunne maintained a keen interest in musical theatre, making his stage debut in An Cumann Gaelach's production of 'Oisín i(n) (d)Tír na nÓg' in 2019.
