= Fred Davies (rugby union) =

English rugby union player

- Born: September 17, 1998 (age 28)
- Height: 186 cm (6 ft 1 in)
- Weight: 109 kg (240 lb; 17 st 2 lb)
- School: Oakham School
- University: Durham University

Rugby union career
- Position: Hooker
- Current team: Doncaster Knights
Senior career
Years	Team	Apps	(Points)
2022–2024	Bristol Bears	14	(10)
2022–2024	→ Hartpury University (D/R)	9	(0)
2024–2026	Doncaster Knights	11	(0)
2026-	Rosslyn Park		

Fred Davies (born 17 September 1998) is an English rugby union player who represents Rosslyn Park as a hooker.

Davies attended Oakham School. In his early career he represented Northampton Saints academy throughout school.

On leaving school, Fred played for Cambridge in National League 1, England and went abroad in Australia to play for Eastern Suburbs. He was scouted by Pat Lam while playing for Durham University, and joined Bristol Bears in 2022 following the completion of his undergraduate degree and a sabbatical year working for the university.

In summer of 2024, Davies left Bristol Bears to sign for Doncaster Knights in the RFU Championship. Davies joined Rosslyn Park in 2026, as their Community Project Manager and into the 1st XV team.
