= Louis Brown =

American physicist and historian of science (1929–2004)

- Born: January 7, 1929; San Angelo, Texas, U.S.
- Died: September 25, 2004 (aged 75); New York City, U.S.
- Education: St. Mary's University (BS, 1950); University of Texas at Austin (PhD, 1958)
- Known for: Polarized ion sources; Accelerator mass spectrometry; History of radar
- Spouse: Lore Elisabeth Frick
- Scientific career
- Fields: Nuclear physics, isotope geochemistry, history of science
- Workplaces: University of Basel; Carnegie Institution of Washington

Louis "Lou" Brown (January 7, 1929 – September 25, 2004) was an American physicist and historian of science. He spent most of his career at the Carnegie Institution of Washington's Department of Terrestrial Magnetism (DTM), where he worked on polarized ion sources, helped develop accelerator mass spectrometry, and later wrote a history of radar and one of his own department.

== Early life and education ==
Brown was born in San Angelo, Texas. He studied physics at St. Mary's University in San Antonio, receiving a B.S. in 1950, then served two years as an artillery lieutenant in the United States Army in Germany. He completed a Ph.D. in physics at the University of Texas at Austin in 1958.

== Physics ==
Brown took a postdoctoral position at the University of Basel, where he worked with Hermann Rudin and Hans Rudolf Striebel to build a source of polarized protons and deuterons for accelerator experiments. The Basel group was the first to produce a beam of polarized deuterons, work for which it received the university's Amerbach Prize.

He joined DTM in 1961 under director Merle Tuve and installed a polarized proton source of his own design on the department's pressurized Van de Graaff accelerator. For the next fifteen years he directed Carnegie's nuclear physics program, run in collaboration with Basel and the University of Wisconsin–Madison, which studied interactions of polarized protons with the light nuclei involved in hydrogen burning in stars.

As accelerator work at DTM wound down, Brown turned to isotope geochemistry and the design of scientific instruments. With Roy Middleton and Jeffrey Klein at the University of Pennsylvania and colleagues at DTM, he was among the earliest developers of accelerator mass spectrometry. A 1982 paper in Nature reported the detection of cosmogenic beryllium-10 in island-arc lavas at concentrations of a few million atoms per gram, evidence that ocean-floor sediment is carried down with the subducting plate and incorporated into arc magmas. He served as acting director of DTM from 1991 to 1992 and continued to build mass spectrometers as an emeritus staff member. At the time of his death, he was working on an instrument to measure the isotopic signatures of meteorites.

== History of science ==
From the 1990s Brown wrote on the history of military technology, including the proximity fuze and radar. His A Radar History of World War II: Technical and Military Imperatives (Institute of Physics, 1999) was noted for its breadth and its international coverage. He also acted as DTM's unofficial archivist and wrote the Centennial History of the Carnegie Institution of Washington, Volume II: The Department of Terrestrial Magnetism, published by Cambridge University Press shortly after his death.

== Personal life and legacy ==
Brown was a fellow of the American Physical Society. A lifelong opera enthusiast, he died of a heart attack in New York City while leaving a performance at the Metropolitan Opera. He was survived by his wife of 52 years, Lore.

In 2022, Carnegie announced that the Browns' estate had left the institution $4.5 million for research in geochemistry and cosmochemistry.

== Selected publications ==
- Brown, Louis; Klein, J.; Middleton, Roy; Sacks, I. S.; Tera, F. (1982). "^{10}Be in island-arc volcanoes and implications for subduction". Nature. 299 (5885): 718–720. doi:10.1038/299718a0.
- Brown, Louis (1999). A Radar History of World War II: Technical and Military Imperatives. Bristol, UK: Institute of Physics. ISBN 9780750306591.
- Brown, Louis (2005). Centennial History of the Carnegie Institution of Washington, Volume II: The Department of Terrestrial Magnetism. Cambridge University Press. ISBN 978-0521830799.
