= Josh Basham =

English rugby union footballer (born 1999)

- Born: Joshua William R. Basham; 17 April 1999 (age 27) Slough, Berkshire, England
- Height: 1.94 m (6 ft 4 in)
- Weight: 106 kg (16 st 10 lb)
- School: Wellington College
- University: Durham

Rugby union career
- Position: Back Row
Youth career
- -: London Irish
Senior career
Years	Team	Apps	(Points)
2017-2018	London Irish	4	(0)
2018-2022	Newcastle Falcons	22	(0)
2022-2023	London Irish	19	(5)
2023-2025	Shimizu Koto Blue Sharks	13	(5)
2025–	Gloucester	5	(0)
- Correct as of 5 Dec 2025
International career
Years	Team	Apps	(Points)
2018	England U20	10	(5)

Joshua William R. Basham (born 17 April 1999) is an English rugby player who last played as a flanker for Gloucester in the Premiership Rugby.

== Early life and education ==
Basham attended Wellington College, where he was part of a dominant rugby side named 'School Team of the Year' in 2015 by Rugby World magazine. He made his professional debut for London Irish during the 2017–18 season, eventually making 3 more appearances. He then transferred away from London Irish to start university at Durham University, paving the way for him to link up with Newcastle Falcons.

== Career ==
In May 2018, Basham was included in the England Under-20 squad for the 2018 World Rugby Under 20 Championship. He was named as a starter in the final, which saw England finish runners up to hosts France.

In April 2021, Basham was promoted from the Newcastle Falcons academy to the first team squad for the following season.

He returned to London Irish prior to the 2022/23 season. He moved to Japan to play for Shimizu Koto Blue Sharks in the Japan Rugby League One competition on a two-year deal ahead of the 2023–24 season.

On 14 May 2025, Basham would return to England to join Gloucester back in the Premiership Rugby ahead of the 2025–26 season.
