= Kieran Wilkinson =

English rugby union player

- Born: Kieran Antony Wilkinson; 3 October 1999 (age 27) Blackpool, England
- Height: 1.80 m (5 ft 11 in)
- Weight: 88 kg (13 st 12 lb)
- School: Kirkham Grammar School

Rugby union career
- Position: Fly-half
- Current team: Caldy RFC
Youth career
- 2017-2018: Sale Sharks
Senior career
Years	Team	Apps	(Points)
2018-2023	Sale Sharks	33	(69)
2018-2023	→Sale FC (dual-registration)	27	(138)
2020-2021	→Coventry RFC (loan)	4	(4)
2023–2024	Leicester Tigers	5	(12)
2024–2025	Newcastle Falcons	11	(23)
2025–	Caldy RFC	0	(0)
- Correct as of 28 July 2024
International career
Years	Team	Apps	(Points)
2016-2017	England U16	??	(??)
2017-2018	England U18	??	(??)
2019	England U20	3	(10)
- Correct as of 11 September 2023

Kieran Wilkinson (born 3 October 1999) is an English rugby union player who plays for Caldy RFC in the RFU Championship, he previously played for Sale, Leicester, and Newcastle. He was educated at Kirkham Grammar School.

On 4 July 2023 Wilkinson joined Leicester from his previous club Sale Sharks. Wilkinson made his Leicester debut in the Premiership Rugby Cup against Caldy RFC, the opposition side included his older brother Connor.

On 8 May 2024 he was announced as a new signing for Newcastle Falcons.
