= Jack Reeves (rugby union) =

English rugby union player (born 2000)

- Born: Jack Reeves; 5 May 2000 (age 26) Bristol, England
- Height: 1.80 m (5 ft 11 in)
- Weight: 88 kg (13 st 12 lb)
- School: Hartpury College

Rugby union career
- Position(s): Centre, Wing
- Current team: Gloucester
Amateur team(s)
Years	Team	Apps	(Points)
- Dursley RFC
Senior career
Years	Team	Apps	(Points)
2017–2024	Gloucester	41	(40)
2017–2020	→ Hartpury University	0	(0)
2021–2022	→ New England Free Jacks	13	(0)
2025–	New England Free Jacks	10	(20)
- Correct as of 9 August 2023
International career
Years	Team	Apps	(Points)
2017–2018	England U18	5	(20)
2019	England U20	2	(0)

Jack Reeves (born 5 May 2000) is an English rugby union player who plays centre or wing for New England Free Jacks in Major League Rugby

== Career ==
Reeves originally took up rugby at five years old and was coached by his father at Dursley RFC before joining Gloucester Academy in 2014. He helped Hartpury University win the AASE Championship title in December 2017.

In March 2018 Reeves started for England U18 against Wales. The following year saw him feature in the 2019 Six Nations Under 20s Championship.

In October 2018 Reeves made his club debut for Gloucester in a 31–7 victory over Wasps in the Premiership Rugby Cup. He spent the 2022 Major League Rugby season on loan with American side New England Free Jacks for further development. In November 2022 Reeves made his first Premiership start against Sale Sharks and later that season in March 2023 extended his contract to stay at Kingsholm.

In January 2025 it was announced that Reeves would return to the New England Free Jacks this time on a permanent basis.

== Honours ==
New England Free jacks

- Major League Rugby Championship: (2025)
