= Archie Vanes =

English rugby union player

- Born: Archie Vanes; 16 September 2001 (age 25) Burton on Trent, England
- School: Brooksby Melton College

Rugby union career
- Position: Hooker
- Current team: Worcester Warriors
Youth career
- -: Melbourne RFC
- -: Ashby RFC
Senior career
Years	Team	Apps	(Points)
2021–2025	Leicester Tigers	18	(50)
2021–2023	→ Nottingham (loan)	22	(25)
2024	→ Cambridge (loan)	5	(10)
2025–	Worcester Warriors		
- Correct as of 15 June 2025
International career
Years	Team	Apps	(Points)
2019–2020	England U18		
2021	England U20	4	(0)
- Correct as of 19 December 2022

Archie Vanes (born 16 September 2001) is an English professional rugby union player for Worcester Warriors in the RFU Championship. He previously played for Leicester Tigers in Premiership Rugby, his preferred position is hooker.

== Career ==
Born in Burton on Trent Vanes first played rugby for Melbourne RFC in Derbyshire before joining Ashby RFC in Leicestershire. He represented England at under 18s level, and in 2021 played for England U20 in the 2021 Six Nations.

Vanes made his Leicester debut on 13 November 2021 as a replacement in a game against Sale Sharks in the Premiership Rugby Cup. He made his league debut on 18 November 2023 as a late replacement against Northampton Saints, and made his European Rugby Champions Cup debut on 17 December 2023, where Vanes scored a hat trick of tries as Leicester beat Stade Français Paris 27–24. He was the first Leicester player to score a hat trick on their European debut.
