= Sam Edwards (rugby union) =

English rugby union player (born 2002)

- Born: 14 June 2002 (age 24)
- Height: 1.82 m (6 ft 0 in)
- Weight: 85 kg (13 st 5 lb; 187 lb)

Rugby union career
- Position: Scrum half
- Current team: Bristol Bears
Senior career
Years	Team	Apps	(Points)
2021-2024	Leicester Tigers	13	(10)
2023-2024	→ Cambridge (loan)		
2024-2025	Bristol Bears		
2025-	Ealing Trailfinders		
International career
Years	Team	Apps	(Points)
- England U20

Sam Edwards (born 14 June 2002) is an English professional rugby union player who is as a scrum half for Ealing Trailfinders Rugby Club.

== Club career ==
Edwards played for Leicester Tigers, making his debut in the Premiership Rugby Cup during the 2021–22 season. He signed a senior academy contract with the club in January 2023. He made four Rugby Premiership appearances for Leicester prior to spending the majority of the 2023–24 season on loan at RFU Championship side Cambridge.

He joined Bristol Bears in April 2024. He made his debut for Bristol against Bedford Blues in the Premiership Rugby Cup on 2 November 2024. During the 24/25 season he went on loan with Bristol Bears partner club Dings Crusaders

He joined Ealing Trailfinders ahead of the 2025-26 season.

== International career ==
He represented England at U20 level.
