= Tom Seabrook =

English rugby union player

- Born: Thomas Byam Seabrook; 15 February 1999 (age 27) Chelmsford, Essex, England
- Height: 1.84 m (6 ft 0 in)
- Weight: 100 kg (15 st 10 lb)
- School: Wycliffe College, Gloucestershire; Dean Close School

Rugby union career
- Position: Centre/Wing
- Current team: Worcester Warriors
Senior career
| Years | Team | Apps | (Points) |
| 2017–2023 | Gloucester | 68 | (45) |
| 2017–2019 | → Hartpury University (loan) | 20 | (45) |
| 2023–2025 | Northampton Saints | 34 | (75) |
| 2025– | Worcester Warriors | 0 | (0) |
- Correct as of 13 November 2020
International career
| Years | Team | Apps | (Points) |
| 2016–2017 | England U18s | 0 | (0) |
| 2017–2019 | England U20s | 6 | (5) |
- Correct as of 13 November 2020

Tom Seabrook (born 15 February 1999) is an English rugby union player for Worcester Warriors in the Elior Champ Rugby.

He made his debut in Gloucester's 62–12 loss to Saracens on 5 May 2018, scoring the fastest try in Premiership Rugby, within 58 seconds. On 14 February 2019, Seabrook signed his first professional contract to stay with Gloucester, thus promoted to the senior squad from the 2019–20 season.

He first appeared for England U18s, scoring two tries in his first two England U18 games against France and Scotland in 2017. He was also named in the three-match tour in South Africa. He also represented England U20s during the 2019 Six Nations Under 20s Championship and the 2019 World Rugby Under 20 Championship.

On 29 January 2023, it was confirmed that Seabrook would join Premiership rivals Northampton Saints ahead of the 2023–23 season.

On 19 June 2025, Seabrook would leave Northampton to join revamped Worcester Warriors in the Champ Rugby for the 2025-26 season.
