= Hallam Chapman =

English rugby union player

- Born: Hallam Chapman; 1 October 1997 (age 29) London, England
- Height: 1.93 m (6 ft 4 in)
- Weight: 118 kg (18 st 8 lb)
- University: Manchester Metropolitan University

Rugby union career
- Position: Flanker
- Current team: Worcester Warriors
Senior career
Years	Team	Apps	(Points)
2017–2019	Sedgley Park	0	(0)
2019–2020	Fylde	0	(0)
2021–2022	Taunton	0	(0)
2022	London Irish	3	(10)
2022–2023	Jersey Reds	6	(5)
2023	Plymouth Albion	4	(0)
2023–2025	Exeter Chiefs	1	(0)
2025–	Worcester Warriors	0	(0)
- Correct as of 29 November 2024
International career
Years	Team	Apps	(Points)
2017	England Counties U20s		
2018	England Students		
- Correct as of 29 November 2024

Hallam Chapman (born 1 October 1997) is an English rugby union player who plays for Worcester Warriors in the Champ Rugby.

Chapman spent time in National League 2 North with Sedgley Park and Fylde playing simultaneously in the league while still representing his university side at Manchester Metropolitan University. He has representative honours including England Counties U20s and England Students and played for National League 1 side Taunton.

He represented London Irish in three Premiership Rugby Cup games during the 2022–23 season. Following this, Chapman signed for Jersey Reds in the RFU Championship for the remainder of the season. However, Jersey enter liquidation due to financial problems, therefore all contracted players were acquitted.

Originally, Chapman was set to join Plymouth Albion on a short-term deal back in the National League competition for the remainder of the 2023–24 season. However, Chapman signed a full-time contract with hometown club Exeter Chiefs following a successful trial period.

On 5 October 2025, Chapman left Exeter to join re-vamped Worcester Warriors in the Champ Rugby for the 2025-26 season.
