= Josh Bainbridge =

English rugby union player

- Full name: Josh Bainbridge
- Born: 17 April 1996 (age 30) Middlesbrough, England
- Height: 183 cm (6 ft 0 in)
- Weight: 92 kg (203 lb; 14 st 7 lb)
- School: Prince Henry's Grammar School
- University: Leeds Beckett University

Rugby union career
- Position: Flanker
- Current team: Newcastle Falcons
Youth career
- 2006-2010: Guisborough RUFC
- 2010-2011: Middlesbrough RUFC
- 2011-2014: Yorkshire Carnegie
Senior career
Years	Team	Apps	(Points)
2014-2019	Yorkshire Carnegie	79	(115)
2017	→ Hull Ionians (loan)	1	(0)
2018	→ Bath (loan)	1	(0)
2019-2021	Jersey Reds	28	(15)
2021-2023	Coventry	44	(55)
2023-	Newcastle Falcons	6	(0)
2014-	Total	147	(170)
- Correct as of 1 January 2024
International career
Years	Team	Apps	(Points)
2013	England under-17	-	(-)
2014	England under-18	-	(-)
2015	England under-19	-	(-)
2015-2016	England under-20	4	(0)
- Correct as of 1 January 2024
Coaching career
- Years: Team
- 2015-2018: Moortown RUFC (Defence coach)
- 2018: Pontefract RUFC (Defence coach)
- 2018-2019: Sandal RUFC (Defence coach)
- 2020-2021: Royals RFC (Head coach)
- 2020-2021: Jersey Reds Women's (Assistant coach)
- Correct as of 1 January 2024

Josh Bainbridge (born 17 April 1996) is an English rugby union player, who plays as a flanker for Newcastle Falcons.

== Career ==
He joined Guisborough RUFC under-10s in 2006, where his friends and grandfather played. He spent a season at Middlesbrough RUFC. In April 2011 he joined Yorkshire Carnegie. He represented England at under-17s, 18s, 19s and 20s while at Yorkshire Carnegie. He spent time on loan at Hull Ionians and Bath. Featuring for Bath in the Premiership Rugby Cup starting at open-side flanker against Newcastle Falcons.

He was set to join Bristol Bears for the 2019–20 season, however the deal fell through at the last minute. He instead signed with Jersey Reds. Where he played 28 matches including a 22–35 win over Russia. In 2021 he moved to Coventry RFC, he was named player of the month in December 2022 for the club.

In 2023 he joined Premiership side Newcastle Falcons, making his debut in a 17-40 Premiership Rugby Cup win over Ampthill.
