= Joe Jones (rugby union) =

Welsh rugby union player

- Born: Joe Jones; 24 July 1995 (age 31) Wrexham, Wales
- Height: 1.83 m (6 ft 0 in)
- Weight: 123 kg (19 st 5 lb; 271 lb)
- School: Alun School / Myerscough College

Rugby union career
- Position: Tighthead Prop
- Current team: Harlequins
Youth career
- 2012-2014: Cardiff Blues
Senior career
Years	Team	Apps	(Points)
2013-2016	Cardiff RFC	42	(0)
2013-2016	Cardiff Blues	2	(0)
2016-2018	Perpignan	7	(5)
2018-2020	Sale Sharks	29	(0)
2020-2021	Doncaster Knights	13	(0)
2021	Coventry	10	(5)
2021-2023	Sale Sharks	27	(5)
2023-2024	Scarlets	7	(0)
2024-2026	Doncaster Knights	35	(5)
2026	Harlequins	5	(0)
2026	Worcester Warriors	0	(0)
International career
Years	Team	Apps	(Points)
2014-2015	Wales U20s	5	(0)
- Correct as of 1 May 2026

Joe Jones (born 24 July 1995) is a Welsh rugby union player who plays for the Harlequins in the Premiership Rugby. He usually plays as a tighthead prop.

== Career ==
The oldest of eight siblings, Joe Jones started playing rugby at Mold RFC before moving on to RGC 1404. From 2016 to 2018, Jones played for Perpignan in Rugby Pro D2, French second division. In 2020, Jones signed for the Doncaster Knights to play in the RFU Championship.
