= 2017–18 Anglo-Welsh Cup =

Tournament details
- Countries: England; Wales
- Tournament format(s): Round-robin and knockout
- Date: 3 November 2017 – 18 March 2018

Tournament statistics
- Teams: 16
- Matches played: 35
- Attendance: 272,709 (7,792 per match)
- Highest attendance: 18,408 (Leicester Tigers v Gloucester)
- Lowest attendance: 2,500 (Sale Sharks v Northampton Saints)
- Tries scored: 257 (7.34 per match)
- Top point scorer(s): (England) Joe Simmonds (Exeter); 54 points
- Top try scorer(s): (England) Joe Cokanasiga (L Irish) (South Africa) Dean Hammond (Worcester) (England) Jonah Holmes (Leicester) (Samoa) Ken Pisi (Northampton); 4 tries each

Final
- Venue: Kingsholm Stadium
- Champions: Exeter Chiefs (2nd title)
- Runners-up: Bath

The 2017–18 Anglo-Welsh Cup was the 46th season of England's national rugby union cup competition, and the 12th and final to follow the Anglo-Welsh Cup format. After this season it was replaced by the Premiership Rugby Cup and was played for by clubs from the English Premiership only.

The competition consists of the four Welsh Pro14 teams and the twelve Aviva Premiership clubs arranged in pools of three English and one Welsh team. English clubs were allocated to the pools depending on their final positions in the 2016–17 Aviva Premiership. Teams will play two home and two away pool matches, with teams in Pools 1 and 4 playing each other and teams in Pools 2 and 3 playing each other. The top team from each pool will qualify for the semi-finals. The competition will take place during the Autumn International window and during the Six Nations.

Leicester Tigers are defending champions after claiming the cup with a 16–12 victory over Exeter Chiefs in the 2016–17 final at Twickenham Stoop. This was Leicester's eighth title in the competition.

== Teams & locations ==
Locations of the 2016–17 Anglo-Welsh Cup teams

Club	Coach	Captain	Stadium	Capacity	City/Area
(England) Bath	(New Zealand) Todd Blackadder	(England) Matt Garvey	The Recreation Ground	14,500	Bath, Somerset, England
(Wales) Cardiff Blues	(England) Danny Wilson	(Wales) Gethin Jenkins	BT Sport Cardiff Arms Park	12,125	Cardiff, Glamorgan, Wales
(Wales) Dragons	(Ireland) Bernard Jackman	(Wales) Cory Hill	Rodney Parade	8,800	Newport, Wales
(England) Exeter Chiefs	(England) Rob Baxter	(England) Jack Yeandle	Sandy Park	12,800	Exeter, Devon, England
(England) Gloucester	(Ireland) David Humphreys	(New Zealand) Willi Heinz	Kingsholm Stadium	16,500	Gloucester, Gloucestershire, England
(England) Harlequins	(England) John Kingston	(Australia) James Horwill	Twickenham Stoop	14,816	Twickenham, Greater London, England
(England) Leicester Tigers	(Australia) Matt O'Connor	(England) Tom Youngs	Welford Road	25,800	Leicester, Leicestershire, England
(England) London Irish	(England) Nick Kennedy	(England) David Paice	Madejski Stadium	24,161	Reading, Berkshire
(England) Newcastle Falcons	(England) Dean Richards	(England) Will Welch	Kingston Park	10,200	Newcastle, Tyne and Wear, England
(England) Northampton Saints	(Australia) Alan Gaffney	(England) Dylan Hartley	Franklin's Gardens	15,500	Northampton, Northamptonshire, England
(Wales) Ospreys	(Wales) Steve Tandy	(Wales) Alun Wyn Jones	Liberty Stadium	20,827	Swansea, West Glamorgan, Wales
(England) Sale Sharks	(England) Steve Diamond	(England) Will Addison	AJ Bell Stadium	12,000	Salford, Greater Manchester, England
(England) Saracens	(Ireland) Mark McCall	(England) Brad Barritt	Allianz Park	10,000	Barnet, Greater London, England
(Wales) Scarlets	(New Zealand) Wayne Pivac	(Wales) Ken Owens	Parc y Scarlets	14,870	Llanelli, Carmarthenshire, Wales
(England) Wasps	(Wales) Dai Young	(England) Joe Launchbury	Ricoh Arena	32,609	Coventry, West Midlands, England
(England) Worcester Warriors	(South Africa) Alan Solomons	(Ireland) Donncha O'Callaghan	Sixways Stadium	12,024	Worcester, Worcestershire, England

== Pool stages ==
Points system

The points scoring system for the pool stages will be as follows:

- 4 points for a win
- 2 points for a draw
- 1 bonus point for scoring four or more tries in a match (TB)
- 1 bonus point for a loss by seven points or less (LB)

=== Pool 1 v Pool 4 ===
Pool 1
Team	P	W	D	L	PF	PA	PD	TF	TA	TB	LB	Pts
(England) Bath (1)	4	4	0	0	112	80	32	12	12	1	0	17
(England) Gloucester	4	2	0	2	133	84	49	20	11	2	1	11
(England) Wasps	4	2	0	2	134	159	-25	20	24	3	0	11
(Wales) Cardiff Blues	4	0	0	4	49	149	-100	6	20	0	0	0
Updated: 4 February 2018; Source: Premiership Rugby

Pool 4
Team	P	W	D	L	PF	PA	PD	TF	TA	TB	LB	Pts
(England) Newcastle Falcons (3)	4	3	0	1	149	81	68	22	12	3	0	15
(England) London Irish	4	2	0	2	137	101	36	21	13	3	1	12
(England) Leicester Tigers	4	2	0	2	109	119	-10	14	16	2	1	11
(Wales) Ospreys	4	1	0	3	77	127	-50	10	17	0	0	4
Updated: 4 February 2017; Source: Premiership Rugby

==== Round 1 (England) ====
4 November 2017
15:00

(2 BP) London Irish (England)	22–26	(England) Bath
Try: Northcote-Green (2) 16' m, 36' m Paice 42' c Lewington 57' m Con: McKibbin (1/1) 43'	Report	Try: Tapuai 3' c L. Davis 51' c Con: F. Burns (2/2) 3', 52'; Pen: F. Burns (4/4) 19', 39', 62', 69'

Madejski Stadium
Attendance: 4,364
Referee: Ben O'Keefe

4 November 2017
15:00

Leicester Tigers (England)	26–24	(England) Gloucester (1 BP)
Try: C. Thacker 11' m Holmes 49' c Thompstone 70' m Con: J. Ford (1/3) 50'; Pen: J. Ford (3/3) 22', 35' 40+1'	Report	Try: McAllister 27' c Vellacott 57'; Hudson 63'; Con: L. Evans (3/3) 28', 58' 64'; Pen: L. Evans (1/3) 15'

Welford Road
Attendance: 18,408
Referee: Craig Evans

4 November 2017
15:00

(1 BP) Wasps (England)	41–53	(England) Newcastle Falcons (1 BP)
Try: J. Willis 6' c O'Sullivan 8' m O. James (2) 18' c, 52' c Armitage (2) 43' m, 69' c Con: Miller (4/6) 7', 19', 53', 70'; Pen: Miller (1/1) 38'	Report	Try: Radwan (2) 21' c 55' c S. Socino 27' c Uzokwe (2) 30' c, 71' m Graham 49' m Hodgson 59' c A. Davidson 65' c Con: C. Willis (3/5) 28', 31', 56'; Hodgson (2/3) 60' 66'; Pen: C. Willis (1/1) 3'

Ricoh Arena
Attendance: 7,517
Referee: Daniel Jones

==== Round 2 ====
10 November 2017
19:30

Ospreys (Wales)	12–36	(England) Wasps (1 BP)
Try: Morgan-Williams 25' c I. Phillips 31' m Con: Price (1/2) 25'	Report	Try: Harris 8' m Macken (2) 10' c, 61' c Armitage 17' c Carr 43' c Con: Eastgate (4/5) 10', 18', 44', 62'; Pen: Eastgate (1/1) 49'

Liberty Stadium
Attendance: 5,020
Referee: Christophe Ridley

10 November 2017
19:45

Bath (England)	33–31	(England) Leicester Tigers (2 BP)
Try: F. Burns 40' c Z. Mercer 65' c Penalty try 77'; Con: F. Burns (2/2) 40+1', 67'; Pen: F. Burns (4/4) 25', 32', 42', 50'	Report	Try: Holmes (2) 16' c, 44' c Thompstone 35' c B. White 60' c Con: Hardwick (4/4) 18', 36', 45', 61'; Pen: Hardwick (1/1) 9'

Recreation Ground
Attendance: 14,354
Referee: Greg MacDonald

11 November 2017
12:30

(1 BP) Gloucester (England)	47–7	(England) London Irish
Try: Heinz 22' c Rapava-Ruskin 27' m Hudson 40' c Thrush 58' c Trinder 60' c Braley 72' c Polledri 75' c Con: B. Burns (2/3) 22', 40+1'; Twelvetrees (4/4) 59', 61', 73', 76'	Report	Try: Hoskins 46' c Con: Tonks (1/1) 47'

Kingsholm
Attendance: 11,272
Referee: Jack Makepeace

11 November 2017
14:30

(1 BP) Newcastle Falcons (England)	57–0	(Wales) Cardiff Blues
Try: M. Young 20' m Sinoti (2) 25' c, 47' m Penalty try 33'; Wilson 39' m Radwan 41' c A. Tait 52' c Hodgson 59' c Graham 78' c Con: Hodgson (5/8) 26', 41', 53', 60', 79'	Report

Kingston Park
Attendance: 3,746
Referee: Anthony Woodthorpe

==== Round 1 (Wales) ====
17 November 2017
19:15

Cardiff Blues (Wales)	16–26	(Wales) Ospreys
Try: Millard 78' c Con: Shingler (1/1) 79'; Pen: Shingler (3/3) 49', 57', 60'	Report	Try: Morgan-Williams 45' c R Williams 70' c Con: Price (1/1) 46'; S Davies (1/1) 71'; Pen: S Davies (4/4) 54', 62', 77', 81'

Cardiff Arms Park
Attendance: 3,204
Referee: Adam Leal

==== Round 3 ====
26 January 2018
19:45

(1 BP) Gloucester Rugby (England)	43–20	(Wales) Ospreys
Try: Hibbard 18' c Atkinson 20' m Braley 50' m Thorley 55' c Trinder 67' m Morgan 72' c Scott 80' c Con: Burns (4/7) 19', 56', 73', 80'	Report	Try: Jeffries 40' c Morgan-Williams 42' m Phillips 76' m Con: Price (1/3) 40'; Pen: Luke Price 49'

Kingsholm
Attendance: 11,683
Referee: Adam Leal

27 January 2018
15:00

Bath Rugby (England)	21–8	(England) Newcastle Falcons
Try: Grant 50' c Charlies 63' c Wilson 76' c Con: Burns (3/3) 51', 64', 76'	Report	Try: Willis 66' m Pen: Hodgson 54'

Recreation Ground
Attendance: 13,627
Referee: Mike English

27 January 2018
15:00

Leicester Tigers (England)	24–12	(Wales) Cardiff Blues
Try: Evans 21' c Olowofela 31' c Hamilton 64' c Con: J. Ford (3/3) 23', 32', 65'; Pen: J. Ford 2'	Report	Try: Roberts 52' c L. Jones 60' m Con: Shingler (1/2) 54'

Welford Road
Attendance: 18,122
Referee: Jack Makepeace

27 January 2018
15:00

(1 BP) London Irish (England)	66–7	(England) Wasps
Try: Lewington 1' m Steele 20' c Cokanasiga (3) 28' c, 71' m, 78' c Hoskins 33' c Marshall 39' c Fainga'a 55' c Van Zyl 59' c Tikoirotuma 76' c Con: Marshall (5/6) 20', 29', 34', 40', 56'; Bell (3/4) 60', 77', 79'	Report	Try: Foster 25' c Con: Umaga 26'

Madejski Stadium
Attendance: 4,598
Referee: Matt O'Grady

==== Round 4 ====
2 February 2018
19:30

Ospreys (Wales)	19–32	(England) Bath (1 BP)
Try: Cross (2) 12' c, 22'm Hook 61' c Con: Price (2/3) 13', 62'	Report	Try: Douglas 32' c Banahan 44' m Penalty Try (2) 70', 76'; Con: Lewis (1/2) 32'; Pen: Lewis (2) 16', 19'

Liberty Stadium
Attendance: 4,223
Referee: Steve Lee

2 February 2018
19:45

Cardiff Blues (Wales)	21–42	(England) London Irish (1 BP)
Try: Summerhill 15' c S Davies 29' c Domachowski 72' c Con: Shingler (3/3) 16', 30', 73'	Report	Try: Lewington 9' c Treviranus (2) 20' c, 46' c Botha 35' c Fowlie 66' c Cokanasiga 79' c Con: James Marshall (6/6) 10', 21', 36', 47', 67, 80'

Cardiff Arms Park
Attendance: 3,123
Referee: Mike Hudson

3 February 2018
15:00

(1 BP) Newcastle Falcons (England)	31–19	(England) Gloucester
Try: Cooper (2) 14' c, 25' c Wilson 28' c Tait 41' c Con: Flood (1/1) 15'; Hodgson (3/3) 25', 29', 43'	Report	Try: Vellacott 7' c Evans 34' c Scott 64' m Con: Williams (2/3) 8', 36'

Kingston Park
Attendance: 4,096
Referee: Matt O'Grady

4 February 2018
13:00

(1 BP) Wasps (England)	50–28	(England) Leicester Tigers (1 BP)
Try: Watson 11' m Miller (2) 15' c, 24' c Garratt 27' c Hampson 45' c Umaga 61' c Bassett 70' m, 77' m Con: Umaga (5/8) 16', 25', 28', 46', 62'	Report	Try: Hamilton 7' c Simmons (2) 34' c, 37' c Holmes 64' c Con: Worth (4/4) 8', 35', 38', 65'

Ricoh Arena
Attendance: 9,409
Referee: Ben Breakspear

=== Pool 2 v Pool 3 ===
Pool 2
Team	P	W	D	L	PF	PA	PD	TF	TA	TB	LB	Pts
(England) Exeter Chiefs (2)	4	3	0	1	147	79	68	23	13	3	0	15
(England) Harlequins	4	3	0	1	120	109	11	18	15	3	0	15
(England) Sale Sharks	4	3	0	1	118	85	33	16	9	1	1	14
(Wales) Dragons	4	2	0	2	84	126	-42	12	17	1	0	9
Updated: 3 February 2018; Source: Premiership Rugby

Pool 3
Team	P	W	D	L	PF	PA	PD	TF	TA	TB	LB	Pts
(England) Northampton Saints (4)	4	3	0	1	129	80	49	18	13	3	0	15
(England) Worcester Warriors	4	1	0	3	116	123	-7	17	18	2	2	8
(England) Saracens	4	1	0	3	111	123	-12	14	17	2	2	8
(Wales) Scarlets	4	0	0	4	43	143	-100	5	21	0	1	1
Updated: 3 February 2018; Source: Premiership Rugby

==== Round 1 (England) ====
3 November 2017
19:45

(1 BP) Worcester Warriors (England)	21–24	(England) Sale Sharks
Try: Dowsett 13' c Lawrence 61' c Howe 80' c Con: Heathcote (2/2) 15', 62'; Olver (1/1) 80'	Report	Try: Ioane 5' c Cliff 31' c Curry 39' c Con: MacGinty (3/3) 7', 32', 40'; Pen: MacGinty (1/1) 76'

Sixways
Attendance: 6,081
Referee: Greg Macdonald

4 November 2017
15:00

(1 BP) Exeter Chiefs (England)	43–28	(England) Northampton Saints (1 BP)
Try: Short 7' c Salmon (2) 15' m, 52' c Hepburn 21' c Freeman 3' c Taione 40' m O'Flaherty 49' m Con: J. Simmonds (4/7) 8', 22', 36', 53'	Report	Try: Furbank 10' c Stephenson 31' c Estelles 67' c Hutchinson 70' c Con: Myler (2/2) 11', 32'; Grayson (2/2) 68', 71'

Sandy Park
Attendance: 10,344
Referee: Matthew O'Grady

5 November 2017
15:00

(1 BP) Saracens (England)	29–30	(England) Harlequins (1 BP)
Try: Nay 35'c Earle 46' m Whiteley 52' m Con: Malins (1/3) 36'; Pen: Malins (4/4) 4', 11', 23', 72'	Report	Try: Sloan 7' m Alofa 56' c Elia 64' m Ibuanokpe 80+2' c Con: Lang (2/3) 57', 80+4'; Pen: Lang (2/2) 71', 75'

Allianz Park
Attendance: 9,214
Referee: Hamish Smales

==== Round 2 ====
10 November 2017
20:00

Sale Sharks (England)	29–22	(England) Saracens (1 BP)
Try: B. Curry 32' c Țăruș 50' m Haley 69' m Con: MacGinty (1/3) 33'; Pen: MacGinty (3/3) 3', 19', 66'; Cliff (1/1) 44'	Report	Try: Skelton 11' c Con: Malins (1/1) 11'; Pen: Malins (5/5) 5', 22', 26', 35', 57'

AJ Bell Stadium
Attendance: 4,273
Referee: Rhys Thomas

11 November 2017
15:00

(BP) Northampton Saints (England)	41–7	(Wales) Dragons
Try: Estelles 15' m Marshall 38' c Pisi 48' c Reinach 56' c Wood 59' m Mitchell 78' c Con: Myler (3/4) 39', 49', 57'; Grayson (1/2) 78'; Pen: Myler (1/1) 42'	Report	Try: Thomas 52' c Con: Robson (1/1) 53'

Franklin's Gardens
Attendance: 9,347
Referee: Mike English

12 November 2017
15:00

Scarlets (Wales)	0–40	(England) Exeter Chiefs (1 BP)
	Report	Try: Malton 12' m Freeman 32' c Penalty try (3) 48', 58, 72'; Hendrickson 66' c Con: J. Simmonds (2/3) 33', 67'

Parc y Scarlets
Attendance: 5,011
Referee: Karl Dickson

12 November 2017
15:00

(BP) Harlequins (England)	45–37	(England) Worcester Warriors (BP)
Try: Visser 10' m Luamanu 23' c Sloan 32' c Chisholm 38' c Lamb 48' m Lang 54' c Alofa 63' c Con: Lang (5/7) 24', 33', 38', 55', 63'	Report	Try: Hammond (3) 2' c, 45' c, 71' m Stelling 26' m Howard 56' m Barry 65' m Con: Olver (2/6) 3', 46'; Pen: Olver (1/1) 15'

Twickenham Stoop
Attendance: 7,300
Referee: Adam Jones

==== Round 1 (Wales) ====
17 November 2017
19:30

Dragons (Wales)	23–18	(Wales) Scarlets (1 BP)
Try: Shipp 43' m Babos 50' c Harris 56' m Con: Robson (1/3) 50'; Pen: Robson (1/1) 29'; Henson (1/1) 75'	Report	Try: Lewis 15' m R Jones 18' c Con: McBryde (1/2) 19'; Pen: McBryde (2/2) 40', 68'

Rodney Parade
Attendance: 3,917
Referee: Adam Jones

==== Round 3 ====
27 January 2018
14:00

(1 BP) Sale Sharks (England)	20–24	(England) Northampton Saints
Try: Moore 30' m James 56' m Jones 70' c Con: De Klerk (1/3) 72'; Pen: Addison 40'	Report	Try: Pisi 47' c Nutley 51' c Tuitavake 80' c Con: Grayson (3/3) 48', 52', 80'; Pen: Grayson 61'

AJ Bell Stadium
Attendance: 2,500
Referee: Anthony Woodthorpe

27 January 2018
15:00

(1 BP) Harlequins (England)	35–7	(Wales) Scarlets
Try: Cheeseman 20' c Lewis 26' c White 45' c Lang 57' c Chisholm 75' c Con: Lang (5/5) 21', 27', 46', 58', 76'	Report	Try: Morgan 71' c Con: Maynard 72'

Twickenham Stoop
Attendance: 9,305
Referee: Elgan Williams

27 January 2018
15:00

(1 BP) Saracens (England)	41–21	(Wales) Dragons
Try: Flanagan 30' m Tompkins 33' c Segun 40' c Gallagher 41' m Reffell 69' m Whiteley 72' m Con: Malins (2/5) 35', 40'; Pen: Malins (2) 2', 50'	Report	Try: Keddie 21' c Belcher 58' c Fairbrother 80' c Con: Kirchner (3/3) 22', 59', 80'

Allianz Park
Attendance: 6,432
Referee: Simon Harding

27 January 2018
15:00

(1 BP) Worcester Warriors (England)	31–21	(England) Exeter Chiefs
Try: Adams (2) 39' m, 67' c Denton 39' c Howe 48' c Baldwin 77' m Con: Shillcock (3/5) 39', 49' 68'	Report	Try: Lawday 2' c Strong 18' c Malton 61' c Con: Simmonds (3/3) 3', 19', 62'

Sixways
Attendance: 7,612
Referee: Adam Jones

==== Round 4 ====
2 February 2018
19:05

Scarlets (Wales)	18–45	(England) Sale Sharks (1 BP)
Try: Price 5' m Reeds 38' c Con: Maynard (1/2) 39'; Pen: Maynard (2) 24', 29'	Report	Try: Charnley 12' m Webber 18' c Curry 20' c Cliff 47' c Reed 51' c Strauss 70' c Langdon 75' m Con: Cliff (4/5) 19', 20', 48', 51'; Redpath (1/2) 70'

Parc y Scarlets
Attendance: 3,021
Referee: Adam Jones

2 February 2018
19:30

(1 BP) Dragons (Wales)	33–27	(England) Worcester Warriors (1 BP)
Try: Sage 10' c Hewitt 19' c Kirchner 43' m Pretorius 58' c Morgan 73' c Con: Kirchner (4/5) 11', 20', 59', 74'	Report	Try: Haupt 1' c Hammond 25' c Howe 51' c Con: Olver (3/3) 1', 26', 51'; Pen: Olver (2) 29', 51'

Rodney Parade
Attendance: 3,662
Referee: Andrew Jackson

2 February 2018
19:45

Northampton Saints (England)	36–10	(England) Harlequins
Try: North 5' c Stephenson 10' c Tuala 26' c Pisi (2) 29' m, 67' c Con: Francis (3/4) 6', 12', 27'; Myler (1/1) 68'; Pen: Francis 45'	Report	Try: Lambert 39' m Marchant 75'

Franklin's Gardens
Attendance: 10,125
Referee: Nic Berry

3 February 2018
15:00

(1 BP) Exeter Chiefs (England)	43–20	(England) Saracens
Try: O'Flaherty (2) 4' m, 49' m Devoto (2) 13' c, 46' c Low 16' c Maunder 26' c Davis 75' m Con: J. Simmonds (4/7) 14', 17', 27', 47'	Report	Try: Whiteley 19' m Segun 28' m Malins 40' m Lindsay 70' m

Sandy Park
Attendance: 12,437
Referee: Elgan Williams

== Semi-finals ==
9 March 2018
19:45

Bath (England)	13–12	(England) Northampton Saints
Try: Douglas 18' c Con: Lewis (1/1) 19'; Pen: Lewis (2) 4', 47'	Report	Pen: Myler (4) 23', 28', 31', 55'

Recreation Ground
Attendance: 8,455
Referee: Adam Jones

11 March 2018
13:00

Exeter Chiefs (England)	20–17	(England) Newcastle Falcons
Try: Townsend 2' c J. Simmonds 47' c Con: J. Simmonds (2/2) 3', 48'; Pen: J. Simmonds (2) 65', 77'	Report	Try: Cooper 25' c Hammersley 32' c Con: Flood (2/2) 26', 33'; Pen: Flood 12'

Sandy Park
Attendance: 8,833
Referee: Karl Dickson

== Final ==
30 March
14:30

Bath (England)	11–28	(England) Exeter Chiefs
Try: Vuna 25' m Con: Burns (0/1); Pen: Burns (2/2) 18', 53'	Report	Try: Innard (2) 4' c, 29' c Salmon 32' m Con: J. Simmonds (2/3) 6', 31'; Pen: J. Simmonds (3) 10', 13', 67'

Kingsholm Stadium
Attendance: 8,074
Referee: Craig Evans

== Attendances ==
- Attendances do not include the final at Kingsholm.

Club	Home games	Total	Average	Highest	Lowest	% Capacity
(England) Bath	3	36,436	12,145	14,354	8,455	84%
(Wales) Cardiff Blues	2	6,327	3,164	3,204	3,123	26%
(Wales) Dragons	2	7,579	3,790	3,917	3,662	45%
(England) Exeter Chiefs	3	31,614	10,538	12,437	8,833	82%
(England) Gloucester	2	22,955	11,478	11,683	11,272	71%
(England) Harlequins	2	16,605	8,303	9,305	7,300	56%
(England) Leicester Tigers	2	36,530	18,265	18,408	18,122	71%
(England) London Irish	2	8,962	4,481	4,598	4,364	19%
(England) Newcastle Falcons	2	7,842	3,921	4,096	3,746	38%
(England) Northampton Saints	2	19,472	9,736	10,125	9,347	63%
(Wales) Ospreys	2	9,243	4,622	5,020	4,223	22%
(England) Sale Sharks	2	6,773	3,387	4,273	2,500	28%
(England) Saracens	2	15,646	7,823	9,214	6,432	78%
(Wales) Scarlets	2	8,032	4,016	5,011	3,021	27%
(England) Wasps	2	16,926	8,463	9,409	7,517	26%
(England) Worcester Warriors	2	13,693	6,847	7,612	6,081	57%

== Individual statistics ==
- * Note that points scorers includes tries as well as conversions, penalties and drop goals. Appearance figures also include coming on as substitutes (unused substitutes not included).

=== Top points scorers ===
Rank	Player	Team	Apps	Points
1	(England) Joe Simmonds	Exeter Chiefs	6	54
2	(England) Freddie Burns	Bath	4	49
3	(England) Max Malins	Saracens	4	46
4	(England) James Lang	Harlequins	4	40
5	(England) Joel Hodgson	Newcastle Falcons	5	33
6	(New Zealand) James Marshall	London Irish	4	27
6	(England) Stephen Myler	Northampton Saints	5	27
7	(England) Rob Miller	Wasps	2	21
7	(England) Will Cliff	Sale Sharks	4	21
7	(England) Sam Olver	Worcester Warriors	4	21

=== Top try scorers ===
Rank	Player	Team	Apps	Tries
1	(England) Joe Cokanasiga	London Irish	3	4
1	(South Africa) Dean Hammond	Worcester Warriors	4	4
1	(England) Jonah Holmes	Leicester Tigers	4	4
1	(Samoa) Ken Pisi	Northampton Saints	5	4
2	(South Africa) Kyle Cooper	Newcastle Falcons	2	3
2	(England) Guy Armitage	Wasps	3	3
2	(England) Ben Curry	Sale Sharks	3	3
2	(England) Tom Howe	Worcester Warriors	3	3
2	(England) Alex Lewington	London Irish	3	3
2	(England) Adam Radwan	Newcastle Falcons	3	3
2	(Wales) Reuben Morgan-Williams	Ospreys	4	3
2	(England) Tom Whiteley	Saracens	4	3
2	(England) Toby Salmon	Exeter Chiefs	5	3
2	(England) Tom O'Flaherty	Exeter Chiefs	6	3

== Season records ==
=== Team ===
Largest home win — 59 points

66–7 London Irish at home to Wasps on 27 January 2018

Largest away win — 40 points

40-0 Exeter Chiefs away to Scarlets on 12 November 2017

Most points scored — 66 points

66–7 London Irish at home to Wasps on 27 January 2018

Most tries in a match — 10

London Irish at home to Wasps on 27 January 2018

Most conversions in a match — 8

London Irish at home to Wasps on 27 January 2018

Most penalties in a match — 5

Saracens away to Sale Sharks on 10 November 2017

Most drop goals in a match — 0

=== Attendances ===
Highest — 18,408

Leicester Tigers at home to Gloucester on 4 November 2017

Lowest — 2,500

Sale Sharks at home to Northampton Saints on 27 January 2018

Highest Average Attendance —

Lowest Average Attendance —

=== Player ===
Most points in a match — 21

(England) Freddie Burns for Bath at home to Leicester Tigers on 10 November 2017

Most tries in a match — 3 (2)

(South Africa) Dean Hammond for Worcester Warriors away to Harlequins on 12 November 2017
(England) Joe Cokanasiga for London Irish at home to Wasps on 27 January 2018

Most conversions in a match — 6

(New Zealand) James Marshall for London Irish away to Cardiff Blues on 2 February 2018

Most penalties in a match — 5

(England) Max Malins for Saracens away to Sale Sharks on 10 November 2017

Most drop goals in a match — 0
