= List of 2019–20 Premiership Rugby transfers =

This is a list of player transfers involving Premiership Rugby teams before or during the 2019–20 season. The list is of deals that are confirmed and are either from or to a rugby union team in the Premiership during the 2018–19 season. It is not unknown for confirmed deals to be cancelled at a later date. On 19 April 2019, London Irish are promoted to the Premiership Rugby whilst Newcastle Falcons are relegated to the RFU Championship for the 2019–20 season.

== Bath ==
=== Players in ===
- (England) Lewis Boyce from (England) Harlequins
- (England) Christian Judge from (England) Cornish Pirates
- (England) Will Stuart from (England) Wasps
- (Zimbabwe) Mike Williams from (England) Leicester Tigers
- (England) Josh McNally from (England) London Irish
- (England) Miles Reid promoted from Academy
- (England) Will Vaughan promoted from Academy
- (England) Sam Nixon promoted from Academy
- (England) Ollie Fox from (England) Yorkshire Carnegie
- (England) Tom de Glanville promoted from Academy
- (Fiji) Josh Matavesi from (England) Newcastle Falcons
- (Scotland) Cameron Redpath from (England) Sale Sharks
- (Wales) Rhys Webb from (France) Toulon

=== Players out ===
- (England) Dave Attwood to (England) Bristol Bears
- (New Zealand) Paul Grant to (England) Ealing Trailfinders
- (Wales) Luke Charteris retired
- (New Zealand) James Wilson to (Japan) Mitsubishi DynaBoars
- (France) Victor Delmas to (France) Biarritz
- (Samoa) Kahn Fotuali'i to (France) Montpellier
- (South Africa) Jacques van Rooyen to (Japan) NTT DoCoMo Red Hurricanes
- (England) Jack Wilson to Hong Kong FC
- (Tonga) Cooper Vuna to (England) Newcastle Falcons
- (Samoa) Anthony Perenise to (France) Rouen
- (South Africa) Michael van Vuuren to (England) Northampton Saints
- (England) Max Lahiff to (England) Bristol Bears
- (Wales) Jamie Roberts to (South Africa) Stormers

== Bristol Bears ==
=== Players in ===
- (England) Nathan Hughes from (England) Wasps
- (England) Dave Attwood from (England) Bath
- (England) Sam Bedlow promoted from Academy
- (England) John Hawkins promoted from Academy
- (Wales) Toby Fricker from (Wales) Ebbw Vale
- (Samoa) Jordan Lay returned from (Wales) Ospreys
- (Wales) Nicky Thomas from (Wales) Scarlets
- (Jamaica) Tyrese Johnson-Fisher from (United States) Coastal Carolina Chanticleers
- (England) Max Lahiff from (England) Bath
- (England) Henry Purdy from (England) Coventry
- (New Zealand) Adrian Choat from (New Zealand) Auckland (short-term loan)
- (Ireland) Bryan Byrne from (Ireland) Leinster (short-term loan)
- (Wales) Kieron Assiratti from (Wales) Cardiff Blues (short-term loan)
- (Ireland) Niyi Adeolokun from (Ireland) Connacht
- (Ireland) Peter McCabe from (Ireland) Connacht

=== Players out ===
- (Australia) Nick Haining to (Scotland) Edinburgh
- (England) Jack Tovey to (England) Ealing Trailfinders
- (Scotland) Reiss Cullen to (England) Doncaster Knights
- (Australia) George Smith retired
- (South Africa) Nick Fenton-Wells retired
- (New Zealand) Joe Latta to (Japan) Suntory Sungoliath/ (New Zealand) Otago
- (Samoa) Tusi Pisi to (Japan) Toyota Industries Shuttles
- (England) Ehize Ehizode to (England) Chinnor
- (Tonga) Sione Faletau to (England) Yorkshire Carnegie
- (Australia) Tom Pincus to (Australia) Melbourne Rebels
- (Samoa) Jack Lam released
- (Jamaica) Tyrese Johnson-Fisher released
- (England) Sam Jeffries Sabbatical

== Exeter Chiefs ==
=== Players in ===
- (Scotland) Stuart Hogg from (Scotland) Glasgow Warriors
- (England) Will Witty from (England) Newcastle Falcons
- (England) Tom Price from (Wales) Scarlets
- (England) Jordon Poole from (England) Darlington Mowden Park
- (England) Stan South from (England) Harlequins
- (South Africa) Jannes Kirsten from (South Africa) Bulls
- (South Africa) Jacques Vermeulen from (South Africa) Sharks
- (Argentina) Enrique Pieretto from (Argentina) Jaguares

=== Players out ===
- (Argentina) Santiago Cordero to (France) Bordeaux
- (Scotland) Jack Owlett to (England) Wasps
- (South Africa) Wilhelm van der Sluys to (South Africa) Lions
- (England) Tom Lawday to (England) Harlequins
- (England) Paul Davis to (England) Ealing Trailfinders
- (England) Harry Strong to (England) Nottingham
- (England) Toby Salmon to (England) Newcastle Falcons
- (Scotland) Moray Low retired
- (Scotland) Ollie Atkins to (France) Rouen
- (Australia) Mitch Lees to (France) Brive
- (England) James Freeman to (England) Rosslyn Park
- (Tonga) Onehunga Havili to (Japan) Sunwolves
- (England) Stan South to (Scotland) Edinburgh "short-term loan"

== Gloucester ==
=== Players in ===
- (England) Alex Seville promoted from Academy
- (England) Joe Simpson from (England) Wasps
- (Scotland) Charlie Chapman promoted from Academy
- (Scotland) Alex Craig promoted from Academy
- (England) Ciaran Knight promoted from Academy
- (England) Tom Seabrook promoted from Academy
- (England) Henry Walker promoted from Academy
- (England) Jamal Ford-Robinson from (England) Northampton Saints
- (England) Simon Linsell from (England) Hartpury College
- (Scotland) Chris Harris from (England) Newcastle Falcons
- (South Africa) Corné Fourie from (South Africa) Stormers
- (England) Jack Stanley from (Scotland) Edinburgh
- (Samoa) Logovi'i Mulipola from (England) Newcastle Falcons (short-term deal)

=== Players out ===
- (Ireland) Paddy McAllister to (Ireland) Connacht
- (Scotland) Ben Vellacott to (England) Wasps
- (England) Tom Savage to (Japan) Suntory Sungoliath
- (England) Gareth Denman to (England) Coventry
- (England) Gareth Evans to (Wales) Ospreys
- (England) Ewan Fenley to (England) Ealing Trailfinders
- (England) Cameron Terry to (England) Ealing Trailfinders
- (England) Joe Mullis to (England) Cinderford
- (England) Henry Purdy to (England) Coventry
- (England) Will Safe to (England) Hartpury College
- (Scotland) Kyle Traynor to (England) Rosslyn Park
- (England) Callum Allen to (England) Nottingham
- (South Africa) Jaco Kriel to (South Africa) Lions

== Harlequins ==
=== Players in ===
- (Argentina) Santiago Garcia Botta from (Argentina) Jaguares
- (Argentina) Martin Landajo from (Argentina) Jagaures
- (Italy) Michele Campagnaro from (England) Wasps
- (Wales) Scott Baldwin from (Wales) Ospreys
- (South Africa) Stephan Lewies from (South Africa) Lions
- (Scotland) Glen Young from (England) Newcastle Falcons
- (England) Will Evans from (England) Leicester Tigers
- (South Africa) Simon Kerrod from (England) Worcester Warriors
- (England) Tom Lawday from (England) Exeter Chiefs
- (England) Toby Freeman from (England) Cornish Pirates
- (England) Brett Herron from Jersey Reds
- (England) Luke Northmore from (Wales) Cardiff Metropolitan University
- (South Africa) Travis Ismaiel from (South Africa) Bulls
- (Fiji) Vereniki Goneva from (England) Newcastle Falcons
- (Fiji) Tevita Cavubati from (England) Newcastle Falcons
- (England) Tom Penny from (England) Newcastle Falcons
- (England) Chris Ashton from (England) Sale Sharks
- (England) Joe Gray from (England) Saracens (short-term loan)
- (Wales) Marc Thomas from (England) Doncaster Knights
- (Ireland) Jack Stafford from (Ireland) Munster

=== Players out ===
- (Samoa) Alofa Alofa to (France) Bayonne
- (England) George Merrick to (France) Clermont
- (England) Lewis Boyce to (England) Bath
- (Australia) James Horwill retired
- (England) Josh Ibuanokpe to (England) Saracens
- (Scotland) Tim Visser retired
- (England) Charlie Walker to (Italy) Zebre
- Calum Waters to England Sevens
- (South Africa) Demetri Catrakilis to (South Africa) Southern Kings
- (Samoa) Mat Luamanu to (France) Bayonne
- (England) Luke Wallace to (England) Coventry
- (England) Stan South to (England) Exeter Chiefs
- (England) Dave Ward to (England) Ampthill
- (England) Josh McNulty to (England) Chinnor
- (England) Henry Cheeseman to (England) Rosslyn Park
- (England) Dave Lewis to (England) Rosslyn Park
- (England) Ben Glynn to (Wales) Ospreys
- (England) Charlie Mulchrone retired

== Leicester Tigers ==
=== Players in ===
- (New Zealand) Jordan Taufua from (New Zealand) Crusaders
- (Ireland) Noel Reid from (Ireland) Leinster
- (England) Calum Green from (England) Newcastle Falcons
- (South Africa) Jaco Taute from (Ireland) Munster
- (Argentina) Tomás Lavanini from (Argentina) Jaguares
- (Samoa) Nephi Leatigaga from (France) Biarritz
- (England) Charlie Clare from (England) Bedford Blues
- (Wales) Joe Thomas from (New Zealand) Otorohanga
- (Ireland) Johnny McPhillips from (Ireland) Ulster
- (South Africa) EW Viljoen from (South Africa) Stormers
- (South Africa) Hanro Liebenberg from (South Africa) Bulls
- (Ireland) Jordan Coghlan from (England) Nottingham
- (England) Tom Hardwick promoted from Academy
- (England) Joe Heyes promoted from Academy
- (England) Sam Lewis promoted from Academy
- (England) Jordan Olowofela promoted from Academy
- (Wales) Tommy Reffell promoted from Academy
- (England) Sam Aspland-Robinson promoted from Academy
- (England) Harry Simmons promoted from Academy
- (England) Ben White promoted from Academy
- (England) Andy Forsyth from (England) Coventry (short-term loan)
- (Fiji) Ifereimi Boladau from (England) Nottingham (short-term loan)
- (England) David Williams from (England) Nottingham (short-term loan)

=== Players out ===
- (Australia) Matt To'omua to (Australia) Melbourne Rebels
- (Zimbabwe) Mike Williams to (England) Bath
- (England) Graham Kitchener to (England) Worcester Warriors
- (England) Mathew Tait retired
- (England) Will Evans to (England) Harlequins
- (England) Tom Varndell to (Hong Kong) South China Tigers
- (England) James Voss to (England) Coventry
- (England) Matt Smith retired
- (Wales) Gareth Owen to (England) Newcastle Falcons
- (New Zealand) Michael Fitzgerald to (Japan) Kamaishi Seawaves
- (South Africa) Clayton Blommetjies returned to (Wales) Scarlets
- (New Zealand) Brendon O'Connor to (New Zealand) Hawke's Bay
- (Tonga) Valentino Mapapalangi to (France) Rouen
- (England) Harry Mahoney to (England) Birmingham Moseley
- (England) Fred Tuilagi to (Italy) Colorno
- (Italy) Leonardo Sarto to (Italy) Benetton
- (England) Joe Ford to (England) Yorkshire Carnegie
- (Tonga) David Feao to (Australia) Brisbane City
- (Scotland) David Denton retired
- (England) Ross McMillan to (England) London Irish (short-term deal)
- (Fiji) Campese Ma'afu released
- (England) Charlie Thacker released

== London Irish ==
=== Players in ===
- (Scotland) Allan Dell from (Scotland) Edinburgh
- (Australia) Nick Phipps from (Australia) NSW Waratahs
- (Australia) Curtis Rona from (Australia) NSW Waratahs
- (Ireland) Seán O'Brien from (Ireland) Leinster
- (Australia) Sekope Kepu from (Australia) NSW Waratahs
- (Ireland) Paddy Jackson from (France) Perpignan
- (New Zealand) Waisake Naholo from (New Zealand) Highlanders
- (Australia) Adam Coleman from (Australia) Melbourne Rebels
- (England) Will Goodrick-Clarke from (England) Richmond
- (South Africa) Ruan Botha from (South Africa) Sharks
- (Tonga) Steve Mafi from (France) Castres
- (England) George Nott from (England) Sale Sharks
- (England) Ross McMillan from (England) Leicester Tigers (short-term deal)
- (Samoa) Belgium Tuatagaloa from unattached
- (England) James Stokes from (England) Coventry
- (England) Ross Neal from (United States) Seattle Seawolves (short-term deal)
- (South Africa) Sebastian de Chaves from (England) Newcastle Falcons (short-term deal)
- Dan Norton from England sevens (short-term deal)

=== Players out ===
- (England) Josh McNally to (England) Bath
- (Ireland) Ian Keatley to (Italy) Benetton
- (Australia) Brendan McKibbin retired
- (New Zealand) Mike Coman retired
- (England) Tommy Bell to (England) Ealing Trailfinders
- (England) Topsy Ojo retired
- (England) Fergus Mulchrone to (England) Sale FC
- (Italy) Luke McLean retired
- (South Africa) Sebastian de Chaves to (England) Newcastle Falcons
- (Samoa) Ofisa Treviranus to (England) Chinnor
- (Scotland) Greig Tonks retired
- (Fiji) Napolioni Nalaga to (Russia) Lokomotiv Penza
- (England) Sam Twomey to (England) Rosslyn Park
- (Canada) Ciaran Hearn to (Canada) Newfoundland Rock
- (Australia) Jake Schatz to (Japan) Sunwolves
- (Samoa) Filo Paulo to (Wales) Cardiff Blues
- (Fiji) Manasa Saulo released

== Northampton Saints ==
=== Players in ===
- (England) Ehren Painter promoted from Academy
- (England) Fraser Dingwall promoted from Academy
- (England) James Grayson promoted from Academy
- (England) Alex Mitchell promoted from Academy
- (New Zealand) Matt Proctor from (New Zealand) Hurricanes
- (England) Reuban Bird-Tulloch from (England) Saracens
- (England) Alex Moon promoted from Academy
- (New Zealand) Owen Franks from (New Zealand) Crusaders
- Ryan Olowofela from England Sevens
- (England) Lewis Bean from (England) Birmingham Moseley
- (England) Karl Garside from (England) Ampthill
- (England) Henry Taylor from (England) Saracens
- (South Africa) Michael van Vuuren from (England) Bath
- (England) James Mitchell from (Ireland) Connacht (short-term deal)
- (Fiji) Sam Matavesi from (England) Cornish Pirates
- (Scotland) Gordon Reid from (Scotland) Glasgow Warriors (short-term deal)
- (England) Ben Glynn from (Wales) Ospreys (short-term deal)

=== Players out ===
- (England) Luther Burrell to (England) Warrington Wolves
- (Hong Kong) Matt Worley to (England) Bedford Blues
- (England) Jamal Ford-Robinson to (England) Gloucester
- (England) James Craig retired
- (England) James Haskell retired
- (England) Charlie Davies retired
- (Australia) Andrew Kellaway to (New Zealand) Counties Manukau
- (England) Tom Emery to (England) Henley Hawks
- (South Africa) Heinrich Brüssow retired
- (England) Will Davis to (England) Ealing Trailfinders (season long loan)
- (England) Dylan Hartley retired
- (Tonga) Nafi Tuitavake to (South Africa) Bulls
- (England) Dominic Barrow released
- (Samoa) Ken Pisi released

== Sale Sharks ==
=== Players in ===
- (England) Jake Cooper-Woolley from (England) Wasps
- (South Africa) Robert du Preez from (South Africa) Sharks
- (South Africa) Akker van der Merwe from (South Africa) Sharks
- (South Africa) Lood de Jager from (South Africa) Bulls
- (South Africa) Coenie Oosthuizen from (South Africa) Sharks
- (South Africa) Dan du Preez from (South Africa) Sharks
- (South Africa) Jean-Luc du Preez from (South Africa) Sharks
- (England) Simon Hammersley from (England) Newcastle Falcons
- (England) Mark Wilson from (England) Newcastle Falcons (season-long loan)
- (South Africa) Embrose Papier from (South Africa) Bulls (short-term loan)
- (England) Ben Carlile from (England) Yorkshire Carnegie
- (England) Joe Carpenter from (England) Yorkshire Carnegie

=== Players out ===
- (Russia) Andrei Ostrikov to (France) Grenoble
- (England) Mark Jennings sabbatical
- (Romania) Alexandru Țăruș to (Italy) Zebre
- (Samoa) Johnny Leota to (England) Sale FC
- (England) Paolo Odogwu to (England) Wasps
- (Australia) James O'Connor to (Australia) Queensland Reds
- (Scotland) Josh Strauss to (South Africa) Bulls
- (England) James Flynn to (England) Yorkshire Carnegie
- (England) George Nott to (England) London Irish
- (Scotland) Ewan Ashman to (Scotland) Edinburgh (short-term loan)
- (England) Tom Bristow released
- (England) Cameron Redpath to (England) Bath
- (England) Sam Moore to (England) Cardiff Blues
- (England) Chris Ashton to (England) Harlequins

== Saracens ==
=== Players in ===
- (England) Elliot Daly from (England) Wasps
- (Wales) Rhys Carré from (Wales) Cardiff Blues
- (England) Jack Singleton from (England) Worcester Warriors
- (England) Alex Day from (England) Cornish Pirates
- (England) Josh Ibuanokpe from (England) Harlequins
- (Wales) Sam Wainwright from (Wales) RGC 1404
- (South Africa) Damian Willemse from (South Africa) Stormers (short-term loan)
- (England) Alistair Crossdale promoted from Academy
- (England) Dom Morris promoted from Academy
- (Fiji) Eroni Mawi from (Fiji) Fijian Latui (short-term deal)

=== Players out ===
- (France) Christopher Tolofua to (France) Toulon
- (England) Reuban Bird-Tulloch to (England) Northampton Saints
- (Tonga) Sione Vailanu to (England) Wasps
- (England) Hayden Thompson-Stringer to (France) Brive
- (England) David Strettle retired
- (England) Henry Taylor to (England) Northampton Saints
- (England) Billy Walker to (England) Nottingham
- (England) Oli Morris to (England) Worcester Warriors
- (England) Tom Griffiths to (Wales) Dragons
- (England) Alfie Scopes to (England) Loughborough Students
- (England) Alex Gliksten to (England) Bedford Blues
- (Wales) Dominic Day to (United States) San Diego Legion
- (Argentina) Marcelo Bosch to (England) Burton
- (South Africa) Schalk Burger released
- (Ireland) Tadgh McElroy released
- (Wales) Liam Williams to (Wales) Scarlets
- (England) Joe Gray to (England) Harlequins (short-term loan)

== Wasps ==
=== Players in ===
- (New Zealand) Malakai Fekitoa from (France) Toulon
- (New Zealand) Jeffery Toomaga-Allen from (New Zealand) Hurricanes
- (Scotland) Jack Owlett from (England) Exeter Chiefs
- (Scotland) Ben Vellacott from (England) Gloucester
- (Italy) Matteo Minozzi from (Italy) Zebre
- (Tonga) Sione Vailanu from (England) Saracens
- (England) Biyi Alo from (England) Coventry
- (England) Will Porter promoted from Academy
- (England) Callum Sirker promoted from Academy
- (England) Sam Spink promoted from Academy
- (England) Tom Willis promoted from Academy
- (England) Tim Cardall promoted from Academy
- (England) Gabriel Oghre promoted from Academy
- (England) Owain James promoted from Academy
- (England) Theo Vukasinovic from (England) London Scottish
- (England) Paolo Odogwu from (England) Sale Sharks
- (England) Zach Kibirige from (England) Newcastle Falcons
- (England) Sam Wolstenholme from (England) Yorkshire Carnegie
- (England) Jacob Umaga promoted from Academy

=== Players out ===
- (England) Jake Cooper-Woolley to (England) Sale Sharks
- (New Zealand) Ambrose Curtis to (France) Vannes
- (England) Nathan Hughes to (England) Bristol Bears
- (England) Will Stuart to (England) Bath
- (England) Elliot Daly to (England) Saracens
- (England) Joe Simpson to (England) Gloucester
- (South Africa) Willie le Roux to (Japan) Toyota Verblitz
- (England) Joe Atkinson to (England) Bedford Blues
- (Italy) Michele Campagnaro to (England) Harlequins
- (England) Antonio Harris to Jersey Reds
- (Scotland) George Thornton to (Scotland) Glasgow Warriors
- (England) Craig Hampson to (England) Ealing Trailfinders
- (England) Kearnan Myall to (England) Oxford University
- (England) David Langley to (England) Coventry
- (Fiji) Gabiriele Lovobalavu to (France) Oyonnax
- (England) Marcus Garratt retired
- (England) Ross Neal to (United States) Seattle Seawolves
- (England) Matt Mullan released
- (England) Owain James released
- (England) Alex Rieder retired

== Worcester Warriors ==
=== Players in ===
- (England) Ted Hill promoted from Academy
- (England) Graham Kitchener from (England) Leicester Tigers
- (Ireland) Conor Carey from (Ireland) Connacht
- (New Zealand) Jono Kitto from (New Zealand) Northland
- (Samoa) Melani Nanai from (New Zealand) Blues
- (Samoa) Ed Fidow from (France) Provence
- (Ireland) Caleb Montgomery from (Ireland) Ulster
- (New Zealand) Matt Moulds from (New Zealand) Blues
- (South Africa) Richard Palframan from (England) London Scottish
- (England) Andrew Kitchener promoted from Academy
- (England) Oli Morris from (England) Saracens

=== Players out ===
- (England) Pierce Phillips to (France) Agen
- (South Africa) Gareth Milasinovich to (Ireland) Ulster
- (New Zealand) Bryce Heem to (France) Toulon
- (Wales) Josh Adams to (Wales) Cardiff Blues
- (South Africa) Simon Kerrod to (England) Harlequins
- (England) Darren Barry to (England) Newcastle Falcons
- (South Africa) Wynand Olivier retired
- (South Africa) Dewald Potgieter retired
- (England) Jack Singleton to (England) Saracens
- (England) Jonny Arr to (England) Birmingham Moseley
- (England) Mason Tonks to (England) Birmingham Moseley
- (Scotland) Jack Cosgrove to (Wales) Dragons
- (England) Carl Kirwan to (England) Chinnor
- (England) Luke Baldwin to (Wales) Dragons (season long loan)
- (England) Zac Xiourouppa to (England) Birmingham Moseley
- (England) Nick Rigby to (England) Birmingham & Solihull
- (England) Ben Te'o to (France) Toulon (short-term deal)
- (Samoa) Alafoti Fa'osiliva to (England) Bedford Blues

== See also ==
- List of 2019–20 Pro14 transfers
- List of 2019–20 RFU Championship transfers
- List of 2019–20 Super Rugby transfers
- List of 2019–20 Top 14 transfers
- List of 2019–20 Major League Rugby transfers
