= List of 2021–22 United Rugby Championship transfers =

This is a list of player transfers involving United Rugby Championship rugby union teams between the end of the 2020–21 season and before the start of the 2021–22 season.

== Benetton ==
=== Players in ===
- (South Africa) Rhyno Smith from (South Africa) Cheetahs
- (South Africa) Carl Wegner from (South Africa) Cheetahs
- (Argentina) Nahuel Tetaz Chaparro from (England) Bristol Bears
- (South Africa) Andries Coetzee from (Japan) Hanazono Kintetsu Liners
- (Italy) Riccardo Favretto from (Italy) Mogliano
- (Italy) Manuel Zuliani from (Italy) Mogliano
- (Argentina) Tomás Albornoz from (Argentina) Jaguares XV
- (Italy) Lorenzo Cannone from (Italy) Petrarca
- (Australia) Joey Caputo from (Australia) Gungahlin Eagles
- (South Africa) Franco Smith from (Italy) Colorno
- (Italy) Leonardo Marin from (Italy) Mogliano
- (Italy) Lorenzo Pani from (Italy) I Cavalieri Prato
- (England) Tommy Bell from (France) Mont-de-Marsan
- (England) Yaree Fantini from (Scotland) Ayrshire Bulls
- (Italy) Mattia Bellini from (Italy) Zebre Parma

=== Players out ===
- (Italy) Marco Riccioni to (England) Saracens
- (Italy) Jayden Hayward retired
- (Italy) Tommaso Allan to (England) Harlequins
- (Italy) Charly Trussardi to (France) Albi
- (Italy) Nicola Quaglio to (Italy) Rovigo Delta
- (Italy) Paolo Garbisi to (France) Montpellier
- (Italy) Leonardo Sarto to (Italy) Rovigo Delta
- (Italy) Angelo Esposito to (Italy) Petrarca
- (Italy) Alberto Sgarbi to (Italy) Petrarca
- (Italy) Derrick Appiah to (Italy) Colorno
- (Italy) Marco Barbini retired
- (Italy) Marco Zanon to (France) Pau
- (Italy) Lorenzo Pani to (Italy) Zebre Parma

== Bulls ==
=== Players in ===
- (South Africa) Jacques du Plessis from (France) Montpellier
- (South Africa) Johan Goosen from (France) Montpellier
- (South Africa) Ruan Combrinck unattached
- (South Africa) Lionel Mapoe from (France) Nice
- (South Africa) Bismarck du Plessis from (France) Montpellier
- (South Africa) David Coetzer from (South Africa) Blue Bulls
- (South Africa) FC du Plessis from (South Africa) Blue Bulls
- (South Africa) Kabelo Mokoena from (South Africa) Blue Bulls
- (South Africa) Sibongile Novuka from (South Africa) Blue Bulls
- (South Africa) Uzile Tele from (South Africa) Blue Bulls
- (South Africa) Cyle Brink from (England) Leicester Tigers
- (South Africa) Dylan Smith from (England) Ealing Trailfinders
- (South Africa) Ruan Vermaak from (Japan) NTT DoCoMo Red Hurricanes Osaka

=== Players out ===
- (South Africa) Ivan van Zyl to (England) Saracens
- (South Africa) Marco van Staden to (England) Leicester Tigers
- (South Africa) Jan Uys to (France) Grenoble
- (South Africa) Tim Agaba to (France) Carcassonne
- (South Africa) Marnus Potgieter to (South Africa) Sharks
- (South Africa) Nizaam Carr to (England) Wasps
- (South Africa) Travis Ismaiel retired
- (South Africa) Clinton Swart to (Japan) Shizuoka Blue Revs
- (South Africa) Dawid Kellerman to (Japan) Mie Honda Heat
- (South Africa) Duane Vermeulen to (Ireland) Ulster
- (South Africa) Diego Appollis to (South Africa) Blue Bulls U21
- (South Africa) Henco Beukes to (South Africa) Griquas
- (South Africa) Jandre Burger to (South Africa) Blue Bulls
- (South Africa) Werner Gouws to (South Africa) Blue Bulls U21
- (South Africa) Jay-Cee Nel to (South Africa) Griquas
- (South Africa) Raynard Roets to (South Africa) Blue Bulls
- (South Africa) Janco Uys to (South Africa) Griquas
- (South Africa) James Verity-Amm to (South Africa) Griquas
- (South Africa) Trevor Nyakane to (France) Racing 92
- (South Africa) David Coetzer to (United States) Houston SaberCats

== Cardiff ==
=== Players in ===
- (Wales) Immanuel Feyi-Waboso promoted from Academy
- (Wales) Rhys Priestland from (England) Bath
- (Wales) Matthew Screech from (Wales) Dragons

=== Players out ===
- (Wales) Ben Warren to (Wales) Ospreys
- (Wales) Ioan Rhys Davies to (France) Graulhet
- (Wales) Ioan Davies to (Wales) Dragons
- (Wales) Ethan Lewis to (England) Saracens
- (Wales) Lewis Jones to (Wales) Dragons (short-term loan)
- (Wales) Cory Hill to (Japan) Yokohama Canon Eagles
- (Wales) Brad Thyer to (Scotland) Glasgow Warriors (short-term loan)
- (Wales) Ben Murphy to (England) Doncaster Knights
- (Wales) Alun Lawrence to Jersey Reds (season-long loan)
- (England) Olly Robinson to (England) Leicester Tigers (season-long loan)
- (Wales) Sam Moore to (Wales) Ospreys

== Connacht ==
=== Players in ===
- (Ireland) Oran McNulty promoted from Academy
- (Ireland) Cian Prendergast promoted from Academy
- (Ireland) Alex Wootton from (Ireland) Munster
- (Australia) Mack Hansen from (Australia) Brumbies
- (Ireland) Dylan Tierney-Martin promoted from Academy
- (Tonga) Leva Fifita from (France) Grenoble
- (South Africa) Shayne Bolton from (South Africa) Shimlas
- (Ireland) Greg McGrath from (Ireland) Leinster
- (Ireland) Sam Illo from (Ireland) Leinster
- (Samoa) Tietie Tuimauga from (New Zealand) Manawatu

=== Players out ===
- (Ireland) Quinn Roux to (France) Toulon
- (Ireland) Stephen Fitzgerald retired
- (Ireland) Seán O'Brien to (England) Exeter Chiefs
- (Ireland) Stephen Kerins to (England) Ealing Trailfinders
- (Ireland) Conor Dean released
- (Ireland) Colm de Buitléar released
- (Ireland) Paddy McAllister retired
- (Ireland) Cillian Gallagher retired
- (Ireland) Conor Kenny to (England) Newcastle Falcons
- (Ireland) Seán O'Brien retired

== Dragons ==
=== Players in ===
- (Wales) Will Rowlands from (England) Wasps
- (Wales) Evan Lloyd promoted from Academy
- (Fiji) Mesake Doge from (France) Brive
- (New Zealand) Aki Seiuli from (Scotland) Glasgow Warriors
- (Wales) Ioan Davies from (Wales) Cardiff
- (Wales) Taylor Davies from (Wales) Scarlets (season-long loan)
- (Wales) Lewis Jones from (Wales) Cardiff (short-term loan)
- (England) Jordan Olowofela from (England) Leicester Tigers (season-long loan)
- (Wales) Cory Allen from (Wales) Ospreys

=== Players out ===
- (Wales) Lewis Evans retired
- (Wales) Matthew Screech to (Wales) Cardiff
- (Wales) Arwel Robson to (England) Cornish Pirates
- (Wales) Connor Edwards to (England) Doncaster Knights
- (Wales) Ed Scragg to (England) Cornish Pirates
- (Wales) Carwyn Penny to (England) Cornish Pirates
- (England) Luke Baldwin returned to (England) Worcester Warriors
- (Wales) Dafydd Howells to (Wales) Ebbw Vale
- (Wales) Ryan Bevington retired
- (England) Tom Griffiths to (England) Coventry (season-long loan)
- (Wales) Deon Smith to (Wales) Newport
- (South Africa) Storm Hanekom to (England) Nottingham
- (Wales) Rhys Lawrence to (Wales) Carmarthen Quins
- (Wales) Max Ayling to Jersey Reds
- (Wales) Joe Goodchild to (England) Ampthill
- (South Africa) Brok Harris to (South Africa) Stormers
- (Wales) James Benjamin to (England) Cornish Pirates (short-term loan)
- (Wales) Luke Yendle to Jersey Reds (short-term loan)
- (Wales) Aaron Jarvis retired
- (Wales) Ioan Davies to Jersey Reds (short-term loan)
- (Wales) Richard Hibbard retired
- (Wales) Jamie Roberts to (Australia) NSW Waratahs
- (Wales) Dan Babos to (England) Coventry (short-term loan)
- (Wales) Tavis Knoyle released

== Edinburgh ==
=== Players in ===
- (Scotland) James Lang from (England) Harlequins
- (Scotland) Glen Young from (England) Harlequins
- (Scotland) Ben Vellacott from (England) Wasps
- (South Africa) Luan de Bruin from (England) Leicester Tigers
- (Ireland) Adam McBurney from (Ireland) Ulster
- (England) Pierce Phillips from (France) Agen
- (South Africa) Henry Immelman from (France) Montpellier
- (Scotland) Cameron Hutchison from (Scotland) Heriot's
- (Scotland) Nathan Chamberlain promoted from Academy
- (Scotland) Ben Muncaster promoted from Academy
- (Argentina) Emiliano Boffelli from (France) Racing 92
- (Argentina) Ramiro Moyano from (France) Toulon
- (Australia) Harry Lloyd from (Australia) Western Force (short-term deal)

=== Players out ===
- (Scotland) Duhan van der Merwe to (England) Worcester Warriors
- (Scotland) Andrew Davidson to (England) Gloucester
- (Scotland) Simon Berghan to (Scotland) Glasgow Warriors
- (Scotland) Ally Miller to (Scotland) Glasgow Warriors
- (South Africa) Mike Willemse to (England) London Irish
- (Fiji) Eroni Sau to (France) Provence
- (Scotland) Lewis Carmichael retired
- (Scotland) Rory Sutherland to (England) Worcester Warriors
- (Scotland) Kyle Rowe to (England) London Irish
- (South Africa) Andries Ferreira to (France) Carcassonne
- (Scotland) Murray McCallum to (Scotland) Glasgow Warriors
- (Scotland) Charlie Jupp released
- (Scotland) Scott King released
- (Scotland) Shaun Gunn to (Scotland) Southern Knights
- (Scotland) Jack Mann to (Scotland) Heriot's
- (Scotland) Dan Nutton to (England) London Scottish
- (Scotland) Patrick Harrison to (England) Wasps (short-term loan)
- Jamie Farndale to Scotland Sevens
- (South Africa) Jordan Venter to (England) Bath
- (Scotland) George Taylor retired

== Glasgow Warriors ==
=== Players in ===
- (Scotland) Duncan Weir from (England) Worcester Warriors
- (Scotland) Jamie Bhatti from (England) Bath
- (Scotland) Ross Thompson promoted from Academy
- (Scotland) Simon Berghan from (Scotland) Edinburgh
- (England) Lewis Bean from (England) Northampton Saints
- (Australia) Jack Dempsey from (Australia) NSW Waratahs
- (New Zealand) Josh McKay from (New Zealand) Crusaders
- (Scotland) Ollie Smith promoted from Academy
- (Australia) Sione Tuipulotu from (Japan) Shizuoka Blue Revs
- (Scotland) Ally Miller from (Scotland) Edinburgh
- (Argentina) Domingo Miotti from (Australia) Western Force
- (Argentina) Sebastián Cancelliere from (Argentina) Jaguares XV
- (Scotland) Tom Lambert promoted from Academy
- (Scotland) Murray McCallum from (Scotland) Edinburgh (short-term deal)
- (Wales) Brad Thyer from (Wales) Cardiff (short-term loan)
- (Tonga) Walter Fifita from (New Zealand) North Harbour
- (South Africa) Nathan McBeth from (South Africa) Lions
- (New Zealand) Tom Jordan from (Scotland) Ayrshire Bulls
- (Scotland) Ewan Ashman from (England) Sale Sharks (season-long loan)

=== Players out ===
- (Scotland) Adam Hastings to (England) Gloucester
- (Scotland) Chris Fusaro retired
- (Tonga) Fotu Lokotui to (France) Agen
- (Scotland) D'Arcy Rae to (England) Bath
- (Australia) Dylan Evans returned to (Wales) Scarlets
- (Samoa) TJ Ioane returned to (England) London Irish
- (Ireland) Ian Keatley released
- (Scotland) George Thornton to (Scotland) Ayrshire Bulls
- (Scotland) Robbie Nairn to (Scotland) Ayrshire Bulls
- (Fiji) Leone Nakarawa to (France) Toulon
- (Scotland) Huw Jones to (England) Harlequins
- (Scotland) Alex Allan to Hong Kong Scottish
- (New Zealand) Aki Seiuli to (Wales) Dragons
- (South Africa) Connor de Bruyn released
- (Scotland) Bruce Flockhart retired
- (Fiji) Nikola Matawalu to (France) Montauban
- (Fiji) Mesu Dolokoto to (Fiji) Fijian Drua
- (Scotland) Murray McCallum to (England) Worcester Warriors
- Lee Jones to Scotland Sevens
- Paddy Kelly to Scotland Sevens
- Ollie Melville to Jamaica Sevens
- (Scotland) Peter Horne retired
- (Scotland) Nick Grigg to (Japan) NTT DoCoMo Red Hurricanes Osaka

== Leinster ==
=== Players in ===
- (Ireland) Nick McCarthy from (Ireland) Munster
- (Samoa) Michael Alaalatoa from (New Zealand) Crusaders
- (Ireland) Tom Clarkson promoted from Academy
- (Ireland) David Hawkshaw promoted from Academy
- (Ireland) Michael Milne promoted from Academy

=== Players out ===
- (Ireland) Rowan Osborne to (Ireland) Munster
- (Australia) Scott Fardy retired
- (Ireland) Cian Kelleher to (England) Ealing Trailfinders
- (Ireland) Greg McGrath to (Ireland) Connacht
- (Ireland) Hugh O'Sullivan to (England) London Irish
- (Ireland) Michael Bent to (New Zealand) Taranaki
- (Ireland) Paddy Patterson to (Ireland) Munster
- (Ireland) Sam Illo to (Ireland) Connacht
- (Ireland) Dan Leavy retired

== Lions ==
=== Players in ===
- (South Africa) Edwill van der Merwe from (South Africa) Stormers
- (South Africa) Eddie Fouché from (South Africa) Pumas
- (South Africa) Pieter Jansen van Vuren from (South Africa) Pumas
- (South Africa) Matt More from (South Africa) Pumas
- (South Africa) Morgan Naudé from (South Africa) Pumas
- (South Africa) Christopher Hollis from (South Africa) Griquas
- (South Africa) Ginter Smuts from (South Africa) Pumas
- (South Africa) Travis Gordon from (South Africa) Golden Lions
- (South Africa) Lunga Ncube from (South Africa) Golden Lions
- (South Africa) PJ Steenkamp from (South Africa) Golden Lions
- (South Africa) Henco van Wyk from (South Africa) Golden Lions
- (South Africa) JP Smith from (United States) LA Giltinis
- (South Africa) Sanele Nohamba from (South Africa) Sharks

=== Players out ===
- (South Africa) Marnus Schoeman to (France) Grenoble
- (South Africa) Jan-Henning Campher to (England) Ealing Trailfinders
- (South Africa) Len Massyn to (England) Ealing Trailfinders
- (South Africa) Hacjivah Dayimani to (South Africa) Stormers
- (South Africa) Gianni Lombard to (Japan) NTT DoCoMo Red Hurricanes Osaka
- (South Africa) Courtnall Skosan to (England) Northampton Saints
- (South Africa) Aidynn Cupido to (South Africa) Golden Lions
- (South Africa) Izan Esterhuizen to (South Africa) Golden Lions
- (South Africa) James Mollentze injured
- (South Africa) Banele Mthenjane to (South Africa) Golden Lions
- (South Africa) Oupa Mthiyane to (South Africa) Golden Lions
- (South Africa) Lindo Ncusane to (South Africa) Golden Lions
- (South Africa) Luke Rossouw to (South Africa) Golden Lions
- (Democratic Republic of the Congo) Ngia Selengbe to (South Africa) Golden Lions
- (South Africa) Sibusiso Shongwe to (South Africa) Golden Lions
- (South Africa) Roelof Smit to (South Africa) Golden Lions
- (South Africa) Boitumelo Tsatsane to (South Africa) Golden Lions
- (South Africa) Dameon Venter to (South Africa) Golden Lions
- (South Africa) Dan Kriel to (United States) Seattle Seawolves
- (South Africa) Dillon Smit to (United States) Houston SaberCats
- (South Africa) Nathan McBeth to (Scotland) Glasgow Warriors
- (South Africa) Wilhelm van der Sluys retired
- (South Africa) Ross Cronjé retired

== Munster ==
=== Players in ===
- (Ireland) Jake Flannery promoted from Academy
- (Ireland) James French promoted from Academy
- (Ireland) Seán French promoted from Academy
- (Ireland) Ben Healy promoted from Academy
- (Ireland) John Hodnett promoted from Academy
- (Ireland) Rowan Osborne from (Ireland) Leinster
- (Ireland) Thomas Ahern promoted from Academy
- (Ireland) Jack Crowley promoted from Academy
- (Ireland) Jack Daly promoted from Academy
- (South Africa) Jason Jenkins from (Japan) Toyota Verblitz
- (Ireland) Josh Wycherley promoted from Academy
- (Ireland) Simon Zebo from (France) Racing 92
- (Ireland) Paddy Patterson from (Ireland) Leinster
- (Australia) Declan Moore from (Australia) Sydney University

=== Players out ===
- (Ireland) Nick McCarthy to (Ireland) Leinster
- (Ireland) Billy Holland retired
- (Ireland) Alex Wootton to (Ireland) Connacht
- (Ireland) CJ Stander retired
- (Ireland) JJ Hanrahan to (France) Clermont
- (Ireland) Tommy O'Donnell retired
- (Ireland) James Cronin to (France) Biarritz
- (New Zealand) Rhys Marshall to (New Zealand) North Harbour
- (Ireland) Alex McHenry to (England) Wasps (short-term loan)
- (Australia) Declan Moore to (Ireland) Ulster (short-term loan)

== Ospreys ==
=== Players in ===
- (Wales) Tomas Francis from (England) Exeter Chiefs
- (Wales) Jac Morgan from (Wales) Scarlets
- (Wales) Ben Warren from (Wales) Cardiff
- (Wales) Osian Knott from (Wales) Scarlets
- (New Zealand) Michael Collins from (New Zealand) Highlanders
- (Ireland) Jack Regan from (New Zealand) Highlanders
- (Tonga) Elvis Taione from (England) Exeter Chiefs
- (Wales) Alex Cuthbert from (England) Exeter Chiefs
- (Wales) Scott Baldwin from (England) Worcester Warriors
- (Wales) Sam Moore from (Wales) Cardiff

=== Players out ===
- (Argentina) Guido Volpi to (England) Doncaster Knights
- (Wales) Rhys Davies released
- (Wales) Garyn Lloyd released
- (Wales) Luke Price to (France) Valence Romans
- (Wales) Scott Williams to (Wales) Scarlets
- (South Africa) Shaun Venter to (France) Bayonne
- (Wales) Caine Woolerton to (Wales) Bridgend
- (Samoa) Jordan Lay to (New Zealand) Auckland
- (Wales) Rhys Thomas to (England) Coventry
- (England) Gareth Evans to (England) Leicester Tigers
- (Wales) Jordan Walters to (Wales) Aberavon
- (Wales) Nicky Thomas to (Wales) Aberavon
- (Wales) Ben Cambriani to (England) Ampthill
- (Wales) Bradley Roderick to (Wales) Pontypridd
- (Wales) Cory Allen to (Wales) Dragons
- (Wales) Lloyd Ashley to (Wales) Scarlets (short-term loan)
- (Wales) Olly Cracknell to (England) London Irish
- (Wales) Ifan Phillips retired
- (Wales) Garyn Phillips to (England) Cornish Pirates (short-term loan)
- (Wales) Harri Morgan to (England) Ampthill (short-term loan)
- (Tonga) Ma'afu Fia to (England) Bath (short-term loan)

== Scarlets ==
=== Players in ===
- (Wales) WillGriff John from (England) Sale Sharks
- (Wales) Carwyn Tuipulotu promoted from Academy
- (Wales) Morgan Jones promoted from Academy
- (Argentina) Tomás Lezana from (Australia) Western Force
- (Wales) Dom Booth promoted from Academy
- (Wales) Kemsley Mathias promoted from Academy
- (Wales) Iestyn Rees promoted from Academy
- (Wales) Scott Williams from (Wales) Ospreys
- (England) Tom Price from (England) Exeter Chiefs
- (Wales) Corey Baldwin from (England) Exeter Chiefs
- (Wales) Lloyd Ashley from (Wales) Ospreys (short-term loan)

=== Players out ===
- (South Africa) Werner Kruger retired
- (Wales) Jac Morgan to (Wales) Ospreys
- (South Africa) Uzair Cassiem to (France) Bayonne
- (Wales) Osian Knott to (Wales) Ospreys
- (Wales) Harri Doel to (England) Worcester Warriors
- (Australia) Paul Asquith released
- (Australia) Dylan Evans released
- (South Africa) Pieter Scholtz to (England) Wasps
- (Wales) Taylor Davies to (Wales) Dragons (season-long loan)
- (England) Will Homer to (England) Richmond
- (Wales) Tom Phillips to (Wales) Llandovery
- (England) Danny Drake to (England) Doncaster Knights
- (Wales) Jake Ball to (Japan) Green Rockets Tokatsu
- (Australia) Ed Kennedy to (Australia) Brumbies
- (Wales) Joseph Miles to (Wales) Pontypridd
- (Wales) Tom Prydie to (England) Bath
- (Wales) James Davies retired

== Sharks ==
=== Players in ===
- (South Africa) Marnus Potgieter from (South Africa) Bulls
- (South Africa) Bongi Mbonambi from (South Africa) Stormers
- (South Africa) Gerbrandt Grobler from (France) Stade Français
- (South Africa) Eduan Keyter from (South Africa) Griquas
- (Australia) Ben Tapuai from (England) Harlequins
- (Argentina) Joaquín Díaz Bonilla from (England) Leicester Tigers
- (Samoa) Olajuwon Noah from (Australia) NHRU Wildfires
- (South Africa) Tian Meyer from (South Africa) Free State Cheetahs (short-term loan)
- (South Africa) Ruan Pienaar from (South Africa) Free State Cheetahs (short-term loan)
- (South Africa) Lourens Adriaanse from (South Africa) Sharks (Currie Cup)
- (Zimbabwe) Tinotenda Mavesere from (South Africa) University of the Western Cape
- (South Africa) Cameron Wright from (South Africa) Sharks (Currie Cup)
- (South Africa) Dian Bleuler from (South Africa) Stormers

=== Players out ===
- (South Africa) John-Hubert Meyer to (France) Béziers
- (South Africa) JJ van der Mescht to (France) Stade Français
- (South Africa) Michael Kumbirai to (France) Soyaux Angoulême
- (South Africa) Manie Libbok to (South Africa) Stormers
- (South Africa) Jordan Chait to (Israel) Tel Aviv Heat (short-term loan)
- (South Africa) Caleb Dingaan to (South Africa) Sharks (Currie Cup)
- (South Africa) Mzamo Majola to (United States) Seattle Seawolves
- (South Africa) Sanele Nohamba to (South Africa) Lions

== Stormers ==
=== Players in ===
- (South Africa) Juan de Jongh from (England) Wasps
- (South Africa) Deon Fourie from (France) Grenoble
- (South Africa) Hacjivah Dayimani from (South Africa) Lions
- (South Africa) Junior Pokomela from (South Africa) Free State Cheetahs
- (South Africa) Stefan Ungerer from (South Africa) Griquas
- (South Africa) Brok Harris from (Wales) Dragons (short-term deal)
- (South Africa) Manie Libbok from (South Africa) Sharks
- (South Africa) Justin Basson from (South Africa) Western Province
- (South Africa) Dian Bleuler from (South Africa) Western Province
- (South Africa) JJ Kotze from (South Africa) Western Province

=== Players out ===
- (South Africa) Juarno Augustus to (England) Northampton Saints
- (South Africa) Bongi Mbonambi to (South Africa) Sharks
- (South Africa) Abner van Reenen to (Italy) Rovigo Delta
- (South Africa) Edwill van der Merwe to (South Africa) Lions
- (South Africa) JD Schickerling to (Japan) Kobelco Kobe Steelers
- (South Africa) Pieter-Steph du Toit to (Japan) Toyota Verblitz
- (Namibia) Michal Haznar to (South Africa) Griquas
- (South Africa) Sihle Njezula to (South Africa) Western Province
- (South Africa) Dian Bleuler to (South Africa) Sharks
- (South Africa) Justin Basson to (United States) Rugby ATL
- (South Africa) David Meihuizen retired

== Ulster ==
=== Players in ===
- (Ireland) Aaron Sexton promoted from Academy
- (Ireland) Nathan Doak promoted from Academy
- (Ireland) Tom Stewart promoted from Academy
- (Ireland) Ethan McIlroy promoted from Academy
- (Ireland) Callum Reid promoted from Academy
- (Ireland) David McCann promoted from Academy
- (Ireland) Cormac Izuchukwu promoted from Academy
- (Ireland) Mick Kearney from (Italy) Zebre Parma (short-term deal)
- (South Africa) Duane Vermeulen from (South Africa) Bulls
- (Australia) Declan Moore from (Ireland) Munster (short-term loan)
- (Ireland) Ben Moxham promoted from Academy

=== Players out ===
- (Ireland) Hayden Hyde to (England) Harlequins
- (Ireland) Adam McBurney to (Scotland) Edinburgh
- (New Zealand) Alby Mathewson released
- (Ireland) Kyle McCall released
- (New Zealand) Matt Faddes to (New Zealand) Otago
- (Ireland) Bill Johnston to (England) Ealing Trailfinders

== Zebre Parma ==
=== Players in ===
- (Italy) Jacopo Trulla from (Italy) Calvisano
- (Italy) Gabriele Venditti from (Italy) Calvisano
- (Italy) Andrea Zambonin from (Italy) Calvisano
- (Italy) Luca Andreani from (Italy) Bassa Bresciana Rugby
- (Italy) Ion Neculai from (Italy) I Cavalieri Prato
- (Italy) Alessandro Fusco from (Italy) Fiamme Oro
- (Italy) Cristian Stoian from (Italy) Fiamme Oro
- Asaeli Tuivuaka from Fiji Sevens
- (New Zealand) Tim O'Malley from (New Zealand) Highlanders
- (New Zealand) Liam Mitchell from (New Zealand) Hurricanes
- (South Africa) Erich Cronjé from (South Africa) Pumas
- (Argentina) Ramiro Valdés Iribarren from (Argentina) La Tablada
- (New Zealand) Taina Fox-Matamua from (New Zealand) Tasman
- (England) Chris Cook from (England) Northampton Saints
- (Italy) Lorenzo Pani from (Italy) Benetton

=== Players out ===
- (Ireland) Ian Nagle retired
- (New Zealand) Charles Alaimalo returned to (New Zealand) Southland
- (Italy) Lorenzo Masselli released
- (Romania) Alexandru Țăruș to (France) Rouen
- (New Zealand) Josh Renton to (New Zealand) Southland
- (Italy) Samuele Ortis to (Italy) Calvisano
- (Ireland) Mick Kearney to (Ireland) Ulster
- (England) Jamie Elliott to (England) Bedford Blues
- (Argentina) Ramiro Valdés Iribarren to (Italy) Colorno
- (Italy) Tommaso Castello retired
- (Italy) Paolo Pescetto to (Italy) Colorno
- (Italy) Giosuè Zilocchi to (England) London Irish
- (Italy) Mattia Bellini to (Italy) Benetton

== See also ==
- List of 2021–22 Premiership Rugby transfers
- List of 2021–22 RFU Championship transfers
- List of 2021–22 Super Rugby transfers
- List of 2021–22 Top 14 transfers
- List of 2021–22 Rugby Pro D2 transfers
- List of 2021–22 Major League Rugby transfers
