= Massey Rugby Club =

NZ rugby union club, based in Auckland

Coordinates: 36.828551591°S 174.629204953°E

Massey Rugby Club
Club name
Massey Rugby Union Football & Sports Club Inc.
First Season
1959
Ground
Moiré Park
Premierships
1993, 2004, 2005, 2013, 2015, 2016, Runners Up 2014

Senior Firsts Reserve Championships 1995, 1996, 2003, 2004, 2005. Runners Up 1993, 1994, 2006, 2012.

Under 21 Championships 1993, 2007.Runners Up 2004, 2008.

The Massey Rugby Club is a New Zealand rugby union club located in Massey, West Auckland. They are part of the North Harbour Rugby Union and compete in their competitions.

Their colours are red, yellow and blue Hoops, with blue shorts, and red, yellow and blue hooped socks.

Their premier team has been crowned North Harbour Club Rugby Champions on 6 occasions (1993, 2004, 2005, 2013, 2015, and 2016).

North Harbour Reserve Championship winners(5): 1995, 1996, 2003, 2004, 2005

North Harbour Under 21 Championship winners(2): 1993, 2007

== History ==
Back in 1954 the pupils of the local primary school played 7 A'Side matches on an inter-school basis and in 1955 an approach was made to parents by the Hobsonville Rugby Football Club that Massey field a 15 A'Side team on Saturday mornings on a regional competitive basis. As no field was available in Massey at the time - the local Domain being in the process of development - all these games were played on the Hobsonville War Memorial Park. This arrangement lasted one season. When Massey Domain was made available for play, problems arose with the referees from the Kaipara Sub Union as this Domain was situated in the Auckland Rugby Union area and Hobsonville was in the Kaipara Sub Union.

In 1957 Massey was fielding three junior teams which had to travel all over the Kaipara Sub Union area. This proved too much for parents, players and supporters so on the advice of the Kaipara Sub Union it was recommended that Massey approach the Auckland Rugby Union who suggested Massey contact Waitemata Rugby Football Union at the time, and the present colours, red, yellow, and blue hoops and white shorts were approved. The shorts were changed to blue in recent years.

In 1971 the present club rooms were laid out and furnished through the efforts of a very hard working and far-sighted Management committee, the funds being raised in part by the lady supporters and junior teams. With only one field at Massey Domain it was difficult to have a training area and playing field in reasonable condition but Massey managed despite this. In the following year Massey formed senior teams to compete in the Auckland competition.

The senior team won promotion to Division one in 1983.

Before the formation of the North Harbour Union in 1985 Massey were part of the Auckland Rugby Union. In the late 1970s the team won rapid promotions from the third division up to the first division. The team has historically been fed by Massey High School where all of its All Blacks, and other international players have come from.

Massey won their first North Harbour club title in 1993 defeating East Coast Bays 25–19 in the final. 2000 was another notable year for the club as it produced two All Blacks in the same year; Troy Flavell and Ron Cribb. In 2004 and 2005 they won back to back titles, defeating Takapuna both times under the captaincy of Steve Jackson, who went on to captain the Southland NPC team in the following years.

In 2005 former All Black Jonah Lomu signed to play for Massey but due injury was unable to play for them that season. He did however make his debut for the club in 2006. Also in 2006 Anthony Tuitavake made the Junior All Blacks side and in 2008 was selected for the All Blacks, making him the third All Black that Massey had produced.

Massey won their fourth premier club title in 2013, winning 39–33 over North Shore. They lost to North Shore the following year, but gained revenge in 2015 beating them 31–26 in the 3rd successive meeting between the two powerhouses of North Harbour club rugby at that time. In 2016 the same two teams met in the semi-finals with Massey prevailing with an injury time victory 13–9. They faced Takapuna in the final and used their finals experience to win a thriller 26–23 in Golden Point extra time with a drop goal by Rhema Sagote after the final siren.

Massey have now won the North Harbour club competition in 6 of its 32 years, the same number as North Shore.

== Notable players ==
- Ron Cribb - All Black (15 caps), Crusaders, Blues (34 caps)
- Chris Eves - Hurricanes (31 caps)
- Troy Flavell - All Black (22 caps), Auckland (9 caps) Blues (53 caps), North Harbour (59 caps)
- Anthony Tuitavake - All Black (6 caps), New Zealand (2002), Blues (45 caps), Highlanders (10 caps), North Harbour (82 caps)
- Tevita Li - Blues (30 caps), North Harbour (24 caps)
- Hosea Gear - Hurricanes
- Tusi Pisi - Crusaders (1 cap), Hurricanes (17 caps), Sunwolves (18 caps)
- George Pisi - Blues (18 caps), North Harbour (50 caps), Taranaki (4 caps)
- Jonah Lomu - All Black (1994–2002)
- Raymond Niuia - North Harbour
- Junior Polu - North Harbour
- Ken Pisi - North Harbour (25 caps), Samoa (10 caps)
- Chris Smylie - New Zealand (2 caps), Highlanders (10 caps), Hurricanes (40 caps), Blues (28 caps), North Harbour (46 caps), Otago (32 caps)Taranaki (25 caps)
- Nafi Tuitavake - New Zealand Sevens, Tonga (1 cap), Crusaders (20 caps), North Harbour (76 caps)
- Viliami Maʻafu - Blues (13 caps), Tonga (28 caps), Blues (13 caps)
- Tim Shadbolt - Current Mayor of Invercargill and former Mayor of Waitemata City
- Matt Vaega - North Harbour (15 caps), Blues (5 caps)

== North Harbour Representative players ==
- Brent Semmons 1985
- Billy Panapa 1985
- Tony Vandermade 1987-88
- Simon Clavis 1988
- Paul Terekia 1987-88
- Grant Ingersoll 1989
- Ian Calder 1992-94
- Eldon Moors 1992
- Apollo Perelini 1992-93
- Mark Weedon 1993-96
- Eddie Pereleni 1994
- Mike Mullins 1995-97
- Richard Marks 1996
- Ben Allen 1997
- Malua Tipi 1997-99
- Jeff Farhenson 1998-2000
- Ken Wilson 1998
- Ron Cribb 1998-2003
- Troy Flavell 1997-2003
- Silao Leaega 2000
- Anthony Tuitavake 2001-07
- Chris Smylie 2003-11
- David Alo 2002
- Mehaka Whitcliff 2002
- John Tuamoheloa 2002
- Hosea Gear 2003-04
- Tusi Pisi 2003-04-05
- Francis Stowers 2003-06
- Roger Dustow 2004-06
- Steve Jackson 2004-05
- Viliami Maʻafu 2004-06
- Junior Poluleuligaga 2004-06
- Andrew Whiteman 2004-05
- George Pisi 2005-08
- Tusi Pisi 2005-07
- Ken Pisi 2007-12
- Michael Farmer 2008
- Chris Eves 2008
- Nafi Tuitavake 2007-15
- Adrian Smith 2010, 2013–16
- Niko Ratumaitavuki 2010–12, 14-16
- Pita Ahki 2011-15
- Raymond Niuia 2013 -16
- Tevita Li 2013-16
- Dennis Pili-Gaitau 2014
- Gerald Tuitoi-Marnier 2014-16
- Chris Vui 2015
- Matt Vaega 2015
- Hapakuki Moala-Liava'a 2015
- Kima Iosua 2015
- Marko Darabos 2016
