= Tuitavake =

Tuitavake is a surname. Notable people with the surname include:

- Anthony Tuitavake (born 1982), New Zealand rugby union player
- Nafi Tuitavake (born 1989), New Zealand rugby union player
