= Joseph Miles =

Welsh rugby union player (born 1998)

- Born: 17 September 1998 (age 28) Penarth, Wales
- Height: 1.90 m (6 ft 3 in)
- Weight: 109 kg (240 lb; 17 st 2 lb)
- School: Cardiff and Vale College
- University: Swansea University

Rugby union career
- Position: n
Amateur team(s)
Years	Team	Apps	(Points)
2018–2020	Llanelli	22	(0)
2021–	Pontypridd	63	
Senior career
Years	Team	Apps	(Points)
2018	Cardiff Blues	1	(0)
2019–2021	Scarlets	2	(5)
- Correct as of 26 March 2023
International career
Years	Team	Apps	(Points)
2017	Wales U18		

Joseph Miles (born 17 September 1998) is a Welsh rugby union player, who played as a number 8 for the Scarlets and Cardiff Blues.

== Professional career ==
Miles played for the Pentyrch RFC and St. Peters RFC youth teams, and was part of the Cardiff Blues grade age system. While attending Cardiff and Vale College, Miles was named as player of the year.

In 2017, Miles was named in the squad for the Wales U18 tour to South Africa. Miles was involved in the U20 squad, but injuries prevented him from making any appearances for the team.

Ahead of the 2017–18 season, Miles moved from grade age rugby to the academy. Miles made his professional debut for Cardiff Blues in the 2017–18 Anglo-Welsh Cup in the Round 3 match against Leicester Tigers.

He moved to the Scarlets in 2019, and made appeared in the Celtic Cup, scoring a try against Leinster A. While with the Scarlets, Miles also featured for Llanelli RFC. Miles was named in the first-team squad ahead of the 2020–21 season, and released at the end of the season.

Miles subsequently joined Pontypridd RFC in the Welsh Premier Division.
