= Troy Flavell =

NZ international rugby union player

- Born: Troy Vandem Flavell; 4 November 1976 (age 50) Auckland, New Zealand
- Height: 1.95 m (6 ft 5 in)
- Weight: 118 kg (18 st 8 lb)
- School: Massey High School

Rugby union career
- Position: Lock
Amateur team(s)
Years	Team	Apps	(Points)
1994–2004	Massey		
Senior career
Years	Team	Apps	(Points)
2004–06	Toyota Verblitz		
2008–10	Mitsubishi DynaBoars		
2010–12	Bayonne	37	(0)
2012–13	Saint Jean de Luz	9	(5)
Provincial / State sides
Years	Team	Apps	(Points)
1997–2004	North Harbour	59	(60)
2006–07	Auckland	9	(10)
Super Rugby
Years	Team	Apps	(Points)
1998	Chiefs	7	(5)
1999–2008	Blues	79	(40)
International career
Years	Team	Apps	(Points)
2000–08	New Zealand	22	(30)
- Correct as of 5 July 2007

Troy Vandem Flavell (born 4 November 1976 in Auckland, New Zealand) is a former New Zealand Rugby union player. Flavell won 22 caps for New Zealand, and mainly played lock. He is known for his power in the scrum. He attended Massey High School alongside Ron Cribb and both played for Massey Rugby Club.

== Career ==
In October 2005, Flavell returned to New Zealand after a season with Japanese club Toyota Verblitz. In his last game for Toyota Verblitz in the 43rd Japan Championships on 12 February 2006, he was part of a team which lost to the top student side, Waseda University. This was the first time that a Top League team had lost to a university team. He opted for a switch to the Auckland Rugby Union instead of joining his former union North Harbour (based in the northern part of the Auckland Region). He was contracted to Auckland for two seasons.

Flavell regained his All Black place in 2006 with two tests against Ireland before being injured for the rest of the season.

He was named captain of the Blues for the 2007 Super 14 season and was considered the outstanding forward of the Super 14, subsequently regaining his All Black Jersey. He played in the first five tests of the 2007 season. However he was left out of the All Black 2007 Rugby World Cup squad, being replaced by Sione Lauaki. Many people, including Zinzan Brooke considered this to be a bad decision.

In May 2008, Flavell signed to play with the Japanese club Mitsubishi Sagamihara DynaBoars on a two-year contract, starting from the conclusion of the 2008 Super 14 season.

In August 2010, Flavell signed for Bayonne in the French Top 14.

Flavell has played 22 tests for New Zealand, 79 Super Rugby games for the Auckland Blues and 59 games for North Harbour. He has also played for the New Zealand Māori.

In 2020, he completed season 1 of Match Fit.
