= Ron Cribb =

New Zealand rugby union player

- Born: Ronald Te Huia Cribb; 7 July 1976 (age 50) Whanganui, New Zealand
- Height: 1.94 m (6 ft 4 in)
- Weight: 110 kg (240 lb)
- School: Massey High School

Rugby union career
- Position: Number 8
Amateur team(s)
Years	Team	Apps	(Points)
- Massey
Senior career
Years	Team	Apps	(Points)
2003–2008	Kobelco Steelers		
2008–2009	Rugby Rovigo		
Provincial / State sides
Years	Team	Apps	(Points)
1997–2003	North Harbour	41	
Super Rugby
Years	Team	Apps	(Points)
1999–2001	Crusaders		
2001–2003	Blues	34	
International career
Years	Team	Apps	(Points)
2000–2001	New Zealand	15	(20)

Ronald Te Huia Cribb (born 7 July 1976) is a former New Zealand rugby union player. A loose forward, the 1.94 m, 110 kg Cribb is a former All Black, and mainly played number eight.

== Early life ==
Cribb was born in Whanganui, but was raised in Taihape. His mother left when he was three-and-a-half-years-old, and has been troubled by alcohol-related violence. His father, James, died in May, 2011. He befriended Troy Flavell and looked to his family as parental figures. He was expelled from Rutherford High School due to anger issues.

== Career ==
Cribb last played professionally in Japan for Kobelco Steelers. He joined from the North Harbour province.

During his time with North Harbour, Cribb played alongside fellow former All Black Troy Flavell, who was also Cribb's teammate in the Massey High School 1st XV and for the Massey Premier side. Both got their first All Blacks call-ups on the same day.

Cribb played 16 games for the All Blacks, 34 Super 12 games for the Auckland Blues and 41 games for North Harbour. He also played 6 games for New Zealand Māori.

In 2010, his career ended when he suffered a broken neck in Japan as a result of a collapsed maul. In 2020, he was in the Match Fit squad with fellow alumni against New Zealand Barbarians, but was ruled out of the match as the prolapsed cervical disc neck injury had not fully healed.

He returned to Match Fit for season 2 in 2021/22 (aired in June 2022), but revealed that his starting weight and total cholesterol levels were higher than the beginning of season 2, as he was recovering from torn Achilles when playing touch rugby, and also just recovered from non-COVID-19 bronchitis. He remained as a touch-rugby-only reserve player, and emergency assistant coach when Graham Henry was unwell due to illness in season 2.

Cribb is a castaway on the 2022 series of the New Zealand reality television show Celebrity Treasure Island.
