= Kurt Sherlock =

NZ international dual-code rugby player (born 1962)

Personal information
- Born: 31 December 1962 (age 63) New Zealand

Playing information
- Height: 179 cm (5 ft 10 in)
- Weight: 78 kg (12 st 4 lb; 172 lb)

Rugby union
- Position: Second Five Eighth
Club
Years	Team	Pld	T	G	FG	P
	Waitemata
Representative
Years	Team	Pld	T	G	FG	P
1983–86	Auckland
1985	New Zealand	3	0	0	0	0

Rugby league
- Position: Wing, Centre, Five-eighth
Club
Years	Team	Pld	T	G	FG	P
1987–92	Eastern Suburbs	88	8	101	1	235
Representative
Years	Team	Pld	T	G	FG	P
1989	New Zealand	4	0	6	0	12

Kurt Sherlock is a dual international representing his home country of New Zealand in both rugby codes union and league, though he was never capped for a Test match under the union code. He made his rugby league début for the Kiwis in 1989.

== Personal life ==
Sherlock has two sons and two daughters. He is an audit partner at Findex.

He attended Massey High School.

== Sources ==
- Whiticker, Alan; Hudson, Glen (2007). The Encyclopedia of Rugby League Players. Wetherill Park, New South Wales: Gary Allen Pty Ltd. p. 609. ISBN 978-1-877082-93-1.
