= Tevita Li =

New Zealand rugby union player (born 1995)

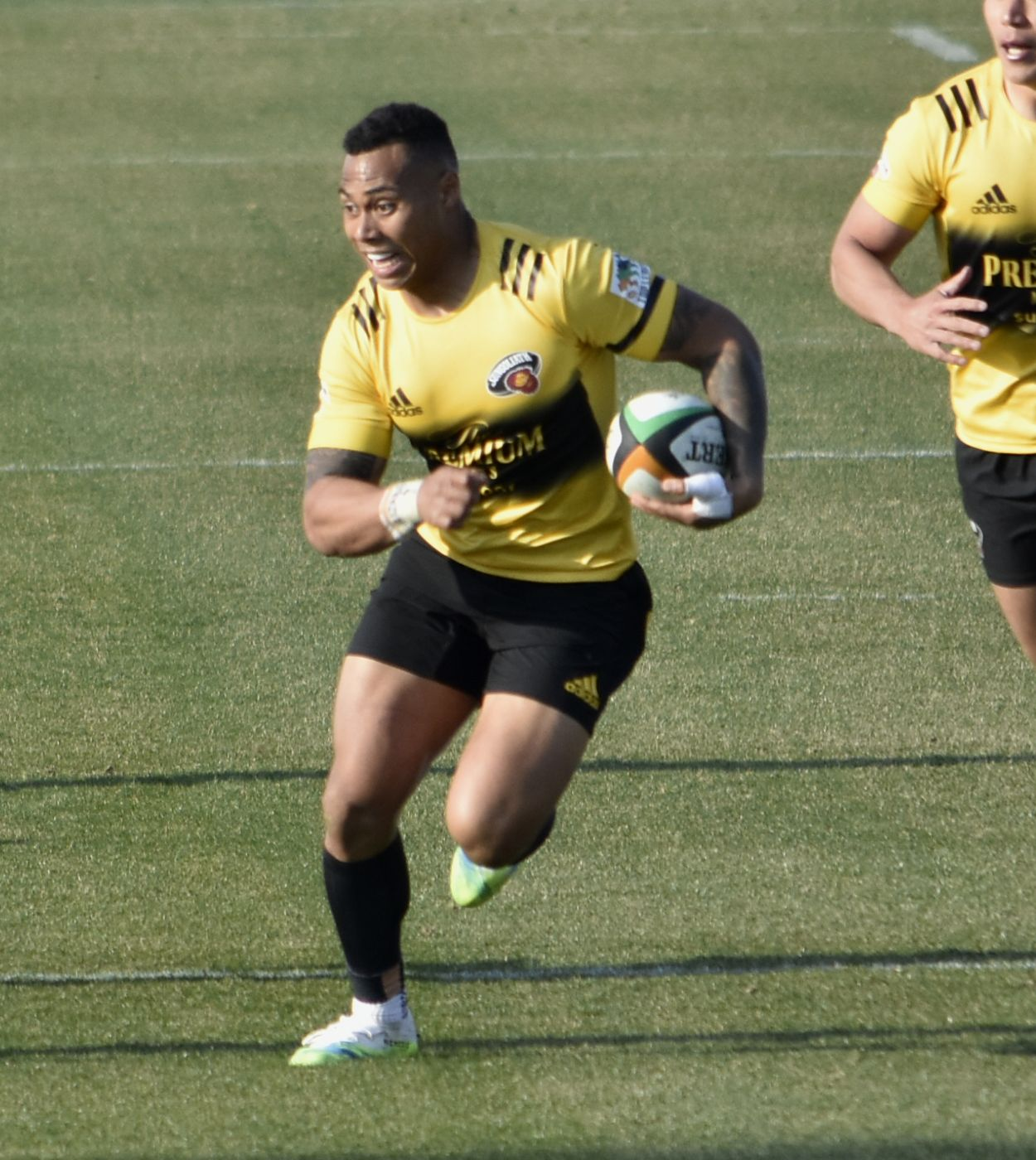
- Born: 23 March 1995 (age 31) Auckland, New Zealand
- Height: 1.82 m (6 ft 0 in)
- Weight: 98 kg (15 st 6 lb; 216 lb)
- School: Massey High School
- Notable relative: Lua Li (Brother)

Rugby union career
- Position(s): Wing, Fullback, Centre
- Current team: Honda Heat
Senior career
Years	Team	Apps	(Points)
2013–2019	North Harbour	59	(215)
2014–2016	Blues	30	(35)
2017–2019	Highlanders	36	(60)
2020–2023	Suntory Sungoliath	31	(120)
2023–	Honda Heat	29	(35)
- Correct as of 31 August 2022
International career
Years	Team	Apps	(Points)
2014	Barbarian F.C.	1	(5)
2014–2015	New Zealand U20	10	(65)
- Correct as of 1 January 2018

Tevita Li (born 23 March 1995) is a New Zealand rugby union player who played as a wing for North Harbour in New Zealand's domestic Mitre 10 Cup and the Highlanders in the international Super Rugby competition.

== Early career ==
Born and raised in Auckland, New Zealand, Li was educated at Massey High School in his home town where he played first XV rugby.

== Senior career ==
Li made his senior debut for North Harbour during the 2013 ITM Cup while aged just 18 years old and still a high school student. He managed 1 try in 4 games in his first season of provincial rugby and was subsequently promoted to the full squad for 2014. His second season saw him feature in all 10 of Harbour's championship matches and score 3 tries as the men from Auckland's North Shore finished in 5th place on the log, just missing out on the promotion playoffs.

He started every game in 2015 and helped himself to 4 tries as Harbour once again came agonisingly close to securing a playoff berth, only to fall just short and end up in 5th spot. However, there was to be no such heartache in 2016 Mitre 10 Cup as Harbour finished in 3rd place in the regular season standings before seeing off the more fancied Wellington and Otago in the playoffs to earn promotion to the 2017 Mitre 10 Cup Premiership. Li was again an ever-present, starting all 12 of Harbour's games during the year as well as bagging a career high 7 season tries including the opening try in the epic 40-37 semi-final victory away to Wellington.

== Super Rugby ==
Li's swift rise from high school prodigy to the upper echelons of the rugby world continued apace in 2014 when Auckland-based Super Rugby franchise, the Blues included him in their wider training group for the 2014 Super Rugby season. After Some impressive outings in pre-season, he was named on the bench for the Blues opening game away to the Highlanders and came on for his Super Rugby debut as a second-half substitute in a 21-29 loss for his side. He went on to score 3 tries in 8 matches in his first season of Super Rugby, at the age of 19. 2015 saw a little stagnation in his progress, featuring 7 times and failing to cross the try line once as the Blues endured a horror season, winning just 3 of 16 games to finish in 14th spot on the overall log.

Prior to the start of the 2016 Super Rugby season Tana Umaga replaced Sir John Kirwan as Blues head coach and this brought about an upturn in fortunes both for the franchise and for Li personally. The Blues finished in a more respectable 11th place, still well away from the playoff spots, while Li started all 15 of their regular season games and scored 4 tries in what would prove to be his final season in Auckland.

In June 2016, it was announced that Li had signed a 1-year deal with 2015 Super Rugby champions, the Highlanders, that would see him move to Dunedin for 2017.

== International ==
Li was a New Zealand Schools representative in 2012 and was also a member of the New Zealand Under-20 sides which competed in the 2014 IRB Junior World Championship and 2015 World Rugby Under 20 Championship. He scored 7 tries in 5 games in 2014 to help New Zealand to 3rd place in their home tournament and followed that up with 6 tries in 5 games in Italy the following year including a hat-trick against France which made him the highest try-scorer in tournament history. Li's tries also helped New Zealand to lift the World Under-20 Championship title for the first time since 2011 as they progressed through the tournament unbeaten and defeated England 21-16 in the final in Cremona.

== Career honours ==
New Zealand Under-20

- World Rugby Under 20 Championship - 2015

North Harbour

- Mitre 10 Cup Championship - 2016

== Super Rugby statistics ==
As of 4 January 2017

Season	Team	Games	Starts	Sub	Mins	Tries	Cons	Pens	Drops	Points	Yel	Red
2014	Blues	8	6	2	474	3	0	0	0	15	0	0
2015	Blues	7	5	2	443	0	0	0	0	0	0	0
2016	Blues	15	15	0	1137	4	0	0	0	20	1	0
Total		30	26	4	2054	7	0	0	0	35	1	0
