= Yaree Fantini =

Italian rugby union player

- Born: 25 November 1997 (age 28) England
- Height: 1.83 m (6 ft 0 in)
- Weight: 106 kg (234 lb; 16 st 10 lb)

Rugby union career
- Position: Flanker
- Current team: Darlington Mowden Park
Youth career
- Lutterworth RFC
- 2014–2017: Leicester Tigers
Amateur team(s)
Years	Team	Apps	(Points)
2017–2019	Northumbria University		
Senior career
Years	Team	Apps	(Points)
2020–2021	Ayrshire Bulls		
2022	Benetton	2	(0)
2022	→Mogliano	5	(0)
2022−	Darlington Mowden Park	0	(0)
- Correct as of 23 Apr 2022
International career
Years	Team	Apps	(Points)
2017	England Sevens	3	(0)
- Correct as of 20 February 2022

Yaree Fantini (born 25 November 1997) is an English rugby union player, currently playing for Darlington Mowden Park. His preferred position is flanker. He is Italian qualified.

Fantini signed for Benetton Rugby in January 2022. He made his debut for Benetton in Round 12 of the 2021–22 United Rugby Championship against Glasgow Warriors. He played with Benetton until the end of the season and with Italian team Mogliano in Top10 on loan.

In 2017 Fantini was named in the England Sevens squad.
