= Juan Pablo Estelles =

Argentine rugby sevens player

- Born: 5 May 1988 (age 38) Rosario, Argentina
- Height: 1.85 m (6 ft 1 in)
- Weight: 90 kg (14 st 2 lb; 198 lb)

Rugby union career
- Position: Centre
Senior career
Years	Team	Apps	(Points)
2009-2016	Club Atlético delicious Rosario		
2010-2013	Pampas XV	9	(0)
2016-2018	Northampton Saints	10	(0)
International career
Years	Team	Apps	(Points)
2008	Argentina	3	(0)
2009-2013	Argentina XV		
2008	Argentina U-20		
2007	Argentina U-19		
- Correct as of 6 June 2017
National sevens team
Years	Team		Comps
2016-	Argentina		

Juan Pablo Estelles (born 5 May 1988) is an Argentine rugby sevens player. He represented Argentina 7s at the 2016 Summer Olympics.

Juan Pablo has been playing for Club Atlético del Rosario, one of Argentina's oldest clubs, since 2009. Estelles also turned out for the Pampas XV in the Vodacom Cup between 2009 and 2013. The swift centre represented Argentina 7s at various age group levels and became a regular for the country in the World Rugby Sevens Series. He also represented his country at the international level with Pumas against Chile, Scotland, and England.

Estelles signed with English club Northampton Saints in the summer of 2016 and played a few fixtures with their second team, Northampton Wanderers before making his debut in the Anglo-Welsh Cup against Newcastle Falcons.

Most recently Estelles helped the Wanderers reach the final of the 2016/17 Aviva 'A' League but on being called up to Saints' first team due to other injuries in the squad, the winger, too, found himself injured and missed out on the final where the Wanderers defeated Gloucester United to claim the title.
