= Tusi Pisi =

Samoa international rugby union player

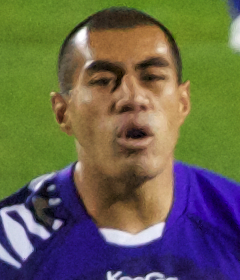
- Pisi in 2011
- Born: Tusiata Pisi; 18 June 1982 (age 44) Apia, Samoa
- Height: 180 cm (5 ft 11 in)
- Weight: 93 kg (14 st 9 lb; 205 lb)
- School: Massey High School
- Notable relative(s): George Pisi, Ken Pisi (brothers)

Rugby union career
- Position: Fly-half / Centre / Fullback
Amateur team(s)
Years	Team	Apps	(Points)
- Massey Rugby Club]
Senior career
Years	Team	Apps	(Points)
2002–2007	North Harbour	50	(114)
2005	Rugby Calvisano	50	(76)
2007–2009	Toulon	68	(229)
2010–2016	Suntory Sungoliath	36	(45)
2016–2019	Bristol Bears	13	(51)
2019–2021	Toyota Industries Shuttles		
- Correct as of 2 December 2024
Super Rugby
Years	Team	Apps	(Points)
2007	Crusaders	1	(0)
2012–2013	Hurricanes	17	(8)
2016	Sunwolves	11	(105)
International career
Years	Team	Apps	(Points)
2003	New Zealand U21		
2006	Pacific Islanders	3	(14)
2011–2019	Samoa	42	(245)
- Correct as of 2 December 2024
Coaching career
- Years: Team
- 2021–2023: Toyota Industries Shuttles (Assistant Coach)
- 2023–2024: Samoa (Assistant Coach)
- 2025-: Samoa

Tusi Pisi (born 18 June 1982) is a Samoan former international rugby union player who played at various levels in Europe, Japan and New Zealand. His position was fly half, but he had also played at centre and full back.

He is currently the head coach of the Samoan national team.

== Playing career ==
Born in Apia, Samoa, Pisi's parents moved him and his brother George (who also played professional rugby) to Auckland as youngsters.

He was later educated at Massey High School, where Pisi became First XV captain whilst playing for his school. After finishing high school, Pisi started to play rugby for Massey Rugby Club before joining North Harbour semi-professionally in 2002.

In 2003, he was selected for the New Zealand Colts, playing alongside the likes of All Black players Jerome Kaino and Stephen Donald.

Over time, he established himself as a constant player in the North Harbour team, and in 2006, he was named in the Pacific Islanders squad for their 2006 European tour, where he started at fly-half in all three matches.

In 2007, he signed his first professional contract with Super Rugby side the Crusaders, but left the side after a year and signed with the then Pro D2 side Toulon.

He became a Pro D2 champion in his first season, and helped the side to promotion to the Top 14 ahead of the 2008–09 Top 14 season.

After two full seasons in France, Pisi moved to Japan, signing for Suntory Sungoliath in Tokyo, where he won the Japan Rugby League One in 2012 and 2013. Whilst still at Suntory, Pisi also played in the Super Rugby, firstly with the Hurricanes between 2012 and 2013, and then later the Sunwolves in 2016.

In 2011, Pisi madę his international debut for Samoa, after choosing to represent his country of his birth. He stated in the opening round of the 2011 IRB Pacific Nations Cup, where Samoa finished bottom with just one win. He was later selected for the 2011 Rugby World Cup in New Zealand, an accolade he replicated in the 2015 and 2019 Rugby World Cup.

He was part of the golden age of Samoan rugby, which saw Samoa record regular wins over Tier 1 opposition; including Australia, Italy, Scotland and Wales.

In March 2016, Pisi signed a 2-year contract with English side Bristol, where after three years, returned to Japan to play for Toyota Industries Shuttles

In 2021, Pisi retired from playing rugby, and transitioned into coaching.

== Coaching career ==
Whilst Pisi didn't fully transition into coaching until after retirement in 2021, he did however have previous experience coaching whilst playing. Firstly at North Harbour, being a rugby academy teacher and coach at Massey High School between 2003 and 2007, before later acting as a part-time skills coach at Cleve RFC between 2017 and 2018 whilst at Bristol.

His first professional coaching position came whilst at Toyota Industries Shuttles, where after retiring at the club, he became an assistant coach at the club.

He later served as co-coach for a Samoan XV side during a last second cancelled match against the Barbarians in 2021 and was appointed as backs and skills coach for the national team ahead of the 2023 Rugby World Cup.

In April 2025, replaced Mahonri Schwalger as the Samoan national team head coach after Schwalger resigned in early 2025.

Sporting positions
Preceded by (Samoa) Mahonri Schwalger	Samoa National Rugby Union Coach; 2025–present	Succeeded by Incumbent
