= Ioan Davies =

- Born: 28 November 1999 (age 26) Cardiff, Wales
- Height: 183 cm (6 ft 0 in)
- Weight: 84 kg (13 st 3 lb)

Rugby union career
- Position: Fullback
Senior career
Years	Team	Apps	(Points)
2020–2021	Cardiff Blues	3	(5)
2021–2023	Dragons RFC	8	(0)
2021–2022	→Jersey Reds (loan)		
- Correct as of 13 October 2022
International career
Years	Team	Apps	(Points)
- Wales U20

Ioan Davies (born 28 November 1999) is a Welsh rugby union player who plays for Newport RFC as a fullback. He was a Wales under-20 international.

Davies made his debut for the Cardiff Blues regional team in 2020 having previously played for the Blues academy.

In 2021, Davies joined the Dragons, initially on a loan before signing a permanent contract.

Davies joined the Jersey Reds on loan in 2021.

Davies was released by the Dragons at the end of the 2022–23 season, and subsequently signed a full-time contract with Newport RFC.
