= Toby Salmon =

English rugby union player

- Born: Toby Salmon; 26 March 1993 (age 33) Norwich, England
- Height: 1.99 m (6 ft 6 in)
- Weight: 120 kg (18 st 13 lb)

Rugby union career
- Position: Lock
- Current team: Saracens
Senior career
Years	Team	Apps	(Points)
2014-2015	London Irish	1	(0)
2016−17	Rotherham Titans	30	(10)
2017−2019	Exeter Chiefs	2	(5)
2019–	Newcastle Falcons	0	(0)
2021	→ Saracens		
2021-2022	Agenais		
2022-	Rouen		

Toby Salmon (born 26 March 1993) is a professional rugby union player who plays for Pro D2 side Rouen Normandie Rugby as a lock forward.

== Early life ==
From Ranworth in Norfolk, Salmon attended Langley School. He started playing rugby union at five years-old, playing locally for North Walsham.

== Career ==
Salmon started his professional rugby career with London Irish in 2014, he then moved to Rotherham Titans in 2016.

He was signed by Exeter Chiefs in the summer of 2017 from the Titans. He scored a try on 30 March 2018 as Exeter beat Bath Rugby in the final of the Anglo-Welsh Cup.

He joined Newcastle Falcons in 2019 signing a two-year contract. On 10 March 2021, Salmon joined Saracens on a loan deal for the remainder of the 2020–21 season. He then spent a season at Agenais before moving to Rouen in 2022.

== Honours ==
Anglo-Welsh Cup

Winners 2017–18
