= Jack Owlett =

English rugby union player

- Full name: Jack Irons Owlett
- Born: 3 February 1995 (age 31) London, England
- Height: 187 cm (6 ft 2 in)
- Weight: 122 kg (269 lb; 19 st 3 lb)
- School: Millfield School
- University: University of Exeter
- Occupation: Professional Rugby player

Rugby union career
- Position: Tighthead Prop
Senior career
Years	Team	Apps	(Points)
2016–2019	Exeter Chiefs		(5)
	→ Cornish Pirates (loan)		(10)
2019–2021	Wasps		
2021–2022	Worcester Warriors		
International career
Years	Team	Apps	(Points)
2015	Scotland U19		(5)
2015	Scotland U20		

Jack Owlett (born 3 February 1995) is a professional rugby union player. He predominantly plays as a tighthead prop, but can also cover as a loosehead prop.

== Education and youth rugby ==
Whilst studying BA Business and Management, Owlett was a key part of the University of Exeter side which lifted the BUCS title at Twickenham Stadium in 2016. His on-field displays caught the attention of the Exeter Chiefs, who used the A League as an opportunity to look at the tighthead’s potential. The former Scotland Under 20's international was offered a contract with the club following his full-time education.

== Career ==
In November 2016 he made his senior debut for Exeter Chiefs by starting in an Anglo-Welsh Cup clash at home to Cardiff Blues. Chiefs beat Cardiff Blues 62-25 at Sandy Park. He went onto feature two more times in the competition that year, including coming off the bench against Leicester Tigers in the 2016/17 Anglo-Welsh final. Owlett was also part of the team that won the Anglo-Welsh Cup the following year, beating Bath Rugby in the final 28-11.

On 17 January 2019, it was announced that Owlett would be joining Wasps at the end of the 2018-19 season. He made his debut for Wasps against Saracens on 21 September 2019 at the Ricoh Arena.

He joined Worcester Warriors ahead of the 2021–22 season. Due to Worcester entering administration and their holding company being liquidated all players contracts were terminated on 5 October 2022.
