= Massey High School =

High school in Massey, New Zealand

Location
- 274 Don Buck Road; Massey; Auckland; 36.8428°S 174.6009°E

Information
- Type: Co-ed state secondary, year 9–13
- Motto: Māori: Kimihia nga maunga tei tei Seek the heights
- Established: 1969
- Ministry of Education Institution no.: 43
- Principal: Alastair Fairley
- Enrolment: 2,113 (July 2026)
- Socio-economic decile: 4
- Website: www.masseyhigh.school.nz

Massey High School is a co-educational state secondary school in West Auckland, New Zealand established in 1969. The school is located on the western edge of the city, thus obtaining students from both suburban and rural backgrounds. In 2017 it was rated decile 4.

== History ==
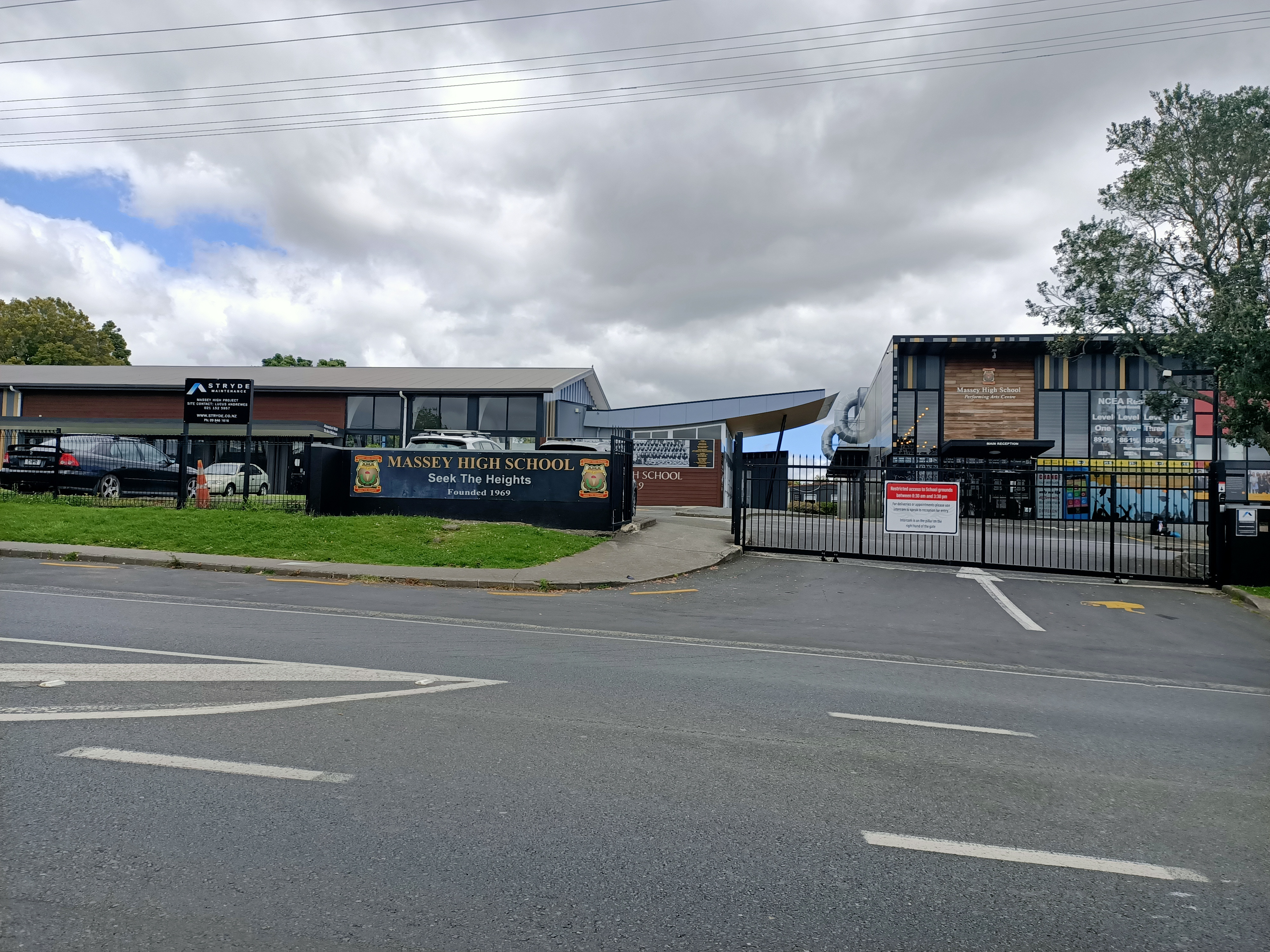
Massey High School in 2021

Established in 1969, the school was initially based at Henderson High School until the buildings on the current site at Don Buck Road were completed in 1970. Initially the school had a rural makeup but as the city of Auckland spread to the west and north the school experienced significant roll growth and an increase in suburban students. In order to accommodate this, the school used prefabricated classrooms.

The school was built to the Nelson Two-Storey standard plan, like most New Zealand secondary schools built in the 1960s. The Nelson Two-Storey is characterised by its two-storey H-shaped classroom blocks, with stairwells at each end of the block and a large ground floor toilet and cloak area on one side. Massey High School has three Nelson Two-Storey blocks.

In 2003 the school began a campus development programme to bring facilities up to date, opening the Bruce Candy Science Centre, a three-story complex with labs for physics, biology, chemistry, electronics and horticulture. Classroom allocation was streamlined in 2003 to create buildings for each department, with buildings being specifically dedicated to English, international languages, mathematics, computing and commerce, art, and history.

The Science Centre was followed in 2004 by the Jack Adam Gymnasium (the second gymnasium on campus), as well as a refurbished swimming pool and athletics complex. A technology building was completed in 2005 with rooms for wood, fabric and metal technologies as well as automotive studies.

In July 2008 MHS was the venue for the launching of the Ministry of Health's Food and Beverage Classification System for New Zealand schools and early childhood education. In the same year the school celebrated its 40th anniversary. Honoured with a Massey High School Alumni Award were Jack Adam, Dr Robert Dunlop, Professor Paul Moon, Brigadier Timothy Keating, Linda Vagana and Philippa Boyens.

A new Performing Arts Centre was opened in 2011 and was named the Bruce Ritchie Performing Arts Centre.

In December 2014, Bruce Ritchie retired from his role as principal of Massey High School. From 2015, Glen Denham became the new principal. After almost 8 years of service, Denham was appointed as Headmaster to Wellington College, being succeeded by Alastair Fairley, the current principal to the school.

List of Massey High School principals: 1. Jack Adam (1969-1985) 2. Owen Hoskin (1986-1993) 3. Bruce Ritchie MNZM (1994-2014) 4. Glen Denham (2015-2022) 5. Alastair Fairley (2022–present)

== Enrolment ==
As of July 2026, Massey High School has a roll of 2,113 students, of which 456 (21.6%) identify as Māori.

As of 2026, the school has an Equity Index of 486, placing it amongst schools whose students have above average socioeconomic barriers to achievement (roughly equivalent to deciles 4 and 5 under the former socio-economic decile system).

== Houses ==
Prior to 2017, the Massey High placed students into one of five schools, each named for a West Auckland beach.

Colour	School	Meaning
	Anawhata	Named for Anawhata beach.
	Karekare	Named after Karekare beach.
	Muriwai	Named for Muriwai beach
	Piha	Named after Piha beach.
	Te Henga	Named for Te Henga beach.

However, beginning in 2017 the school implemented a new four-House system; each house represents a prominent Māori value or a symbol depicted on the school's crest.

Colour	House	Meaning
	Hiranga	"Excellence".
	Kārearea	A Kārearea is a New Zealand falcon, represented on the school crest.
	Mātauranga	"Knowledge".
	Turama	"To light", in reference to the torch depicted on the school logo.

== Student achievements ==
In 2007 two students were part of the New Zealand Youth Parliament.

In 2010 two students were selected to represent the New Zealand Chemistry Olympiad Team to compete in the 42nd International Olympiad to be held in Tokyo.

In 2025, Harveer Talwar, a student from Massey High School was selected as the Youth MP for Upper Harbour for the New Zealand Youth Parliament.

== The arts ==
Massey High School runs an annual theatrical production. Past shows have included 'The Wizard of Oz', 'Bugsy Malone', 'Fame', 'Cabaret', 'Jesus Christ Superstar', 'Grease' and 'Return to the Forbidden Planet'. The school also runs an annual Arts Week, in which students and the community are encouraged to participate in the arts. Arts Weeks features daily events including theatrical shows, choir and orchestral performances, musical performances by student bands, an art exhibition. Arts Week concludes with the yearly talent quest known as Showcase. The annual Massey Fashion Show takes place a few weeks later and showcases student designers and models.

A new Performing Arts Centre was opened in 2011 featuring a 500-seat theatre, cafe and lobby. The Centre has a Fazioli 228 piano, which was anonymously donated in 2011.

== Sports and culture ==
Massey High School has a sports programme, with its Sports Academy accepting new students each year. Sports facilities include two gymnasia, a swimming pool, movement studio, tennis facility, weights room, cricket pitches, two rugby fields and three soccer fields.

Massey High School also embarks on bi-annual overseas sporting trips, including a rugby tour of the UK and Europe in 2004, a rugby and netball tour of South Africa in 2006, a tour of Canada and the US in 2008 which included rugby, netball, girls' and boys' badminton and girls' and boys' hockey teams, a tour of Argentina in 2011 involving Rugby and Hockey teams, and a tour to France and Italy in 2012

The Massey High School Annual Golf Tournament is held yearly at Huapai Golf Club to support the Sports Department. In 2008 the tournament raised $17,000 for the school.

=== Netball ===
The Premier Netball team were the New Zealand secondary school champions in 2005 and 2006. This was the first time a NZ secondary school team had won back to back national titles. The team has featured notable players such as Linda Vagana, Paula Griffin and Cathrine Latu.

=== Cycling ===
Massey has produced numerous national representative riders in the past two decades and enjoyed a great deal of team success. The Junior Boys team won the New Zealand Secondary Schools Team Time Trial title in 1993. The Senior Girls won their first New Zealand Team Time Trial Title in 1994. The team finished off 1994 at the top of New Zealand Secondary Schools Cycling by winning the Junior Boys, Junior Girls, Senior Girls, and Senior Boys New Zealand Individual Cycling Championships. In 1995 Massey High School began to dominate New Zealand Secondary Schools Cycling. The Senior Girls successfully defended their Auckland and National Titles and the Senior Boys won the New Zealand Title.

In 1996 the Senior Boys were undefeated through the year, won the Auckland Points Series, the Auckland Championships, the Auckland Handicap Series (it was only the second time one team had won all three titles), the North Island Championships, and the New Zealand Team Time Trial Championships. The Senior Girls completed a hat-trick for them in retaining their New Zealand Secondary Schools Cycling Title. Individually the following students have all represented New Zealand at school or club level, Vanessa Cheatley, Jon-Paul Hendriksen, George Fuge, Kirsty Robb, Gordon Bearman, Windy Rodokal, Marina Duvnjak, Jarrod Scott, Wade Rose, Lisa Haynes, and Brian Good.

In 2011 Mayor Len Brown presented the school with a cheque for $2,000 to 'Massey Cycling' which he described as the "future of New Zealand cycling". Sammy Croft was selected to the Under 17 New Zealand Development Squad for track cycling at the age of 14.

Ex-MHS student Dion Smith has competed in the Tour de France, and on Stage 2 of the 2018 event he became the first New Zealander ever to wear a 'jersey' awarded to a rider for leading a particular category. He wore the polka dot jersey for "King of the Mountains".

=== Wrestling ===
In 2011 Year 11 student Luke Weir won a gold medal in the 58 kg category in the North Island championships.

=== Individual Success (national honours) ===
Post School The school has produced 5 All Blacks: Kurt Sherlock, Anthony Tuitavake, Ron Cribb, Troy Flavell and Mark Tele'a along with three New Zealand national rugby league team: Kurt Sherlock, Dean Lonergan and Shontayne Hape. In 2007 past students Nafi Tuitavake, Solomon King and staff member Chad Tuora played for the NZ Sevens World Series winning team while Chris Smylie represented NZ Maori. In 2009 Ken Pisi, Nafi Tuitavake and Nalu Tuigamala made the New Zealand Under 20 team. Massey had its first Olympian when Peter Nicholas competed in the 470-class yachting event at the Sydney Olympics. In 2007 Marina Duvnjak was selected in the New Zealand Women's cycling team. Paula Griffin was selected to the Silver Ferns and was named captain of the New Zealand Under 21 World Championship team in 2009. While in 2008 Danielle Barry was selected to play for the New Zealand Badminton team. Lance Beddoes represented New Zealand in squash at the 2014 Glasgow Commonwealth Games.

2007 Daniel Bell won 11 gold medals in the Australasian Tri-Series Swimming Championships and was judged male swimmer of the meet. In the process he broke a New Zealand record and was subsequently ranked 2nd in the world in his age group. Amy Latu was selected to the NZ Under-21 Netball Squad. Oliver Harding Sheath won the Under-19 Boys' New Zealand Road Cycling Championship. Jamie Johns won 5 gold medals, 3 silvers and 2 bronzes at the National Swimming Age Group Championship and was later named in the Trans Tasman Tri-Series Swimming Team. Ashraf Dhoray became the New Zealand Under 18 Boys Doubles and Mixed Doubles Champion in badminton. Luke Charlesworth became the New Zealand Under 21 singles badminton champion and added the New Zealand singles, doubles and mixed doubles titles to his list of achievements in the NZ Age Group Championships. Following the same tournament 4 Massey Students were chosen to represent New Zealand in the Junior World Championships: Ashraf Dhoray, Luke Charlesworth, Kritteka Gregory and Emily Ang. Lance Beddoes became the New Zealand Under 15 Squash Champion and was selected in the New Zealand World Junior Elite Squad. Caitlin Campbell was selected for the New Zealand Women's Soccer team for a tour of China. She was also selected for the New Zealand Under 17 team. Shane Taupo was selected for the Karate World Cup Competition. Alyssa Longville won 3 gold medals at the New Zealand Roller Skating Championships.

2008 Daniel Bell finished 5th as part of a NZ men's 4 × 100 m medley relay team in the Beijing Olympics. He broke two national records at the Olympic qualifying meet, was awarded a SPARC Air New Zealand Inspiring Kiwis Scholarship and he also won the ASB Young Sportsman of the Year Award. Lance Beddoes retained his New Zealand Under 15 Squash Champion title. Thomas Enoka was selected to the New Zealand Under-19's Softball team to play in the world championships along with past students Ben Enoka and Callum Compain. Matthew Oxley, Campbell Enoka and Tamihana Nau were selected for the New Zealand Under-16 Softball team. Nikki Johns was selected for the U-15 NZ Waterpolo team. Emily Ang was selected for the Badminton New Zealand National Squad. Nicholas Gerrard was selected for the Under 18 NZ team for the Oceania Games in Saipan for Athletics in high jump and long jump. Franz Vogel selected for the NZ U-18 Ice Hockey Team.

2009 Lance Beddoes selected for the Squash New Zealand World Junior Squad. Lewis Wild was selected for the New Zealand Junior Men's Water Polo Team for the World Championships in Sibenik, Croatia.

2011 The Massey Boys Softball team won the National Championship after earlier winning the Auckland Championship. Tane Moore became New Zealand Under 16 Orienteering Champion. Caleb Vautier was selected for the Under 17 tournament team at the national championships. Zac Scott was selected to play for the New Zealand Junior Breakers team to tour Australia.

2014 Eruera Drage and Connor Peden partook in the 10th ISF Junior Men's World Softball Championships where they finished 2nd place.

2018 Dion Smith rode in the Tour de France winning the polka dot jersey on stage 2 of the race.

== Notable alumni ==
=== Academia ===
- Paul Moon – historian

=== Entertainment ===
- Angela Bloomfield – actress, Shortland Street
- Philippa Boyens – Academy Award-winning screenwriter, co-wrote The Lord of the Rings film series
- Karl Burnett – actor, Shortland Street
- Daniel Logan – actor, Star Wars series

Groups

- 8 Foot Sativa – NZ metal band.

=== Public service ===
- Tim Keating– former Chief of Defence Force

=== Sport ===
- Sarai Bareman – Represented Samoan football team, currently the Chief Woman's Football Officer for Fifa
- Daniel Bell – swimmer, represented NZ at the 2008 Summer Olympics, winner of two Junior World Championship titles in 2008, winner of the ASB Young Sportsman of the Year Award in 2008 and winner of a silver medal in the 2010 Dehli Commonwealth Games
- Caitlin Campbell – footballer
- Ron Cribb – former All Black
- Chris Eves – Rugby player for North Harbour, Manawatu, Wellington Hurricanes, and New Zealand Maori.
- Troy Flavell – former All Black, 2008 Auckland Blues captain
- Paula Griffin – New Zealand netball international
- Shontayne Hape – represented NZ at Rugby League and England at Rugby Union
- Cathrine Latu – netball international who represented Samoa, New Zealand and Tonga.
- Tevita Li – member of the Blues
- Dean Lonergan – represented NZ at rugby league
- George Pisi – rugby player, Auckland Blues, Manu Samoa, and the North Harbour team
- Ken Pisi – rugby player North Harbour team
- Tusi Pisi – represented North Harbour, Canterbury Crusaders, Manu Samoa and Toulon Rugby
- Kurt Sherlock – represented Auckland and NZ at rugby and rugby league and also Eastern Suburbs Roosters in the NSWRL
- Dion Smith – rode for team Wanty – Groupe Gobert in the 2018 Tour de France.
- Chris Smylie – rugby player, NZ Maoris Member of the Auckland Blues and the North Harbour team
- Mark Tele'a – rugby player, Blues 2020–current
- Anthony Tuitavake – rugby player, All Blacks, Auckland Blues and the North Harbour Team
- Nafi Tuitavake – rugby player, Canterbury Crusaders
- Linda Vagana – New Zealand netball international from 1992–2003
- Christian Lio-Willie – rugby player, NZ XV, Highlanders, Crusaders (Super Rugby) and the North Harbour Team
