= George Pisi =

Samoa international rugby union player

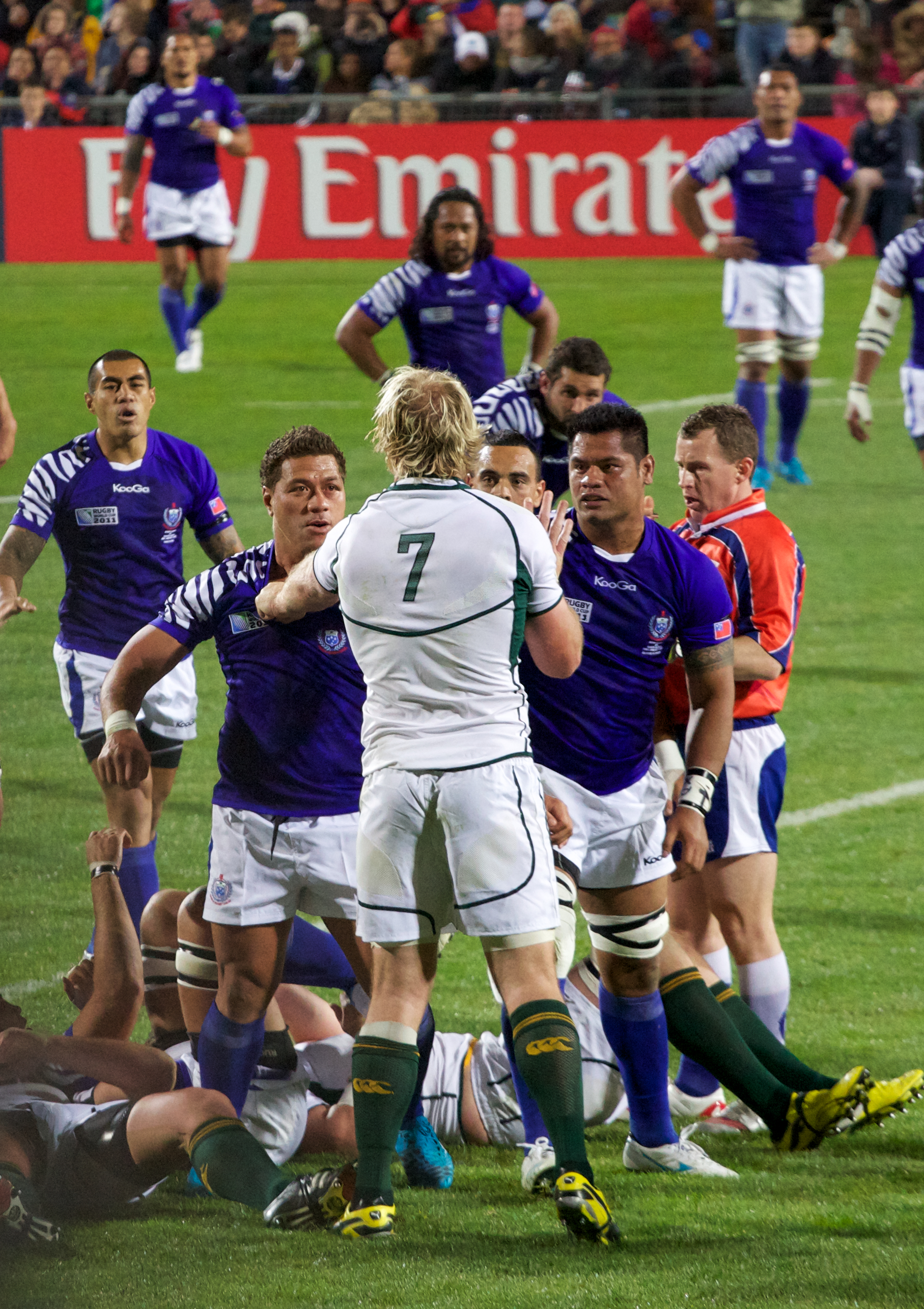
- South Africa vs Samoa 2011
- Full name: Tala'ave George Pisi
- Born: 29 June 1986 (age 40) Apia, Samoa
- Height: 188 cm (6 ft 2 in)
- Weight: 103 kg (227 lb; 16 st 3 lb)
- School: Massey High School
- Notable relative(s): Ken Pisi (brother); Tusi Pisi (brother)

Rugby union career
- Position(s): Centre, Fullback
Senior career
Years	Team	Apps	(Points)
2005–2009	North Harbour	50	(45)
2006–2010	Blues	18	(0)
2010–2011	Taranaki	17	(20)
2011	Clermont	7	(15)
2011–2016	Northampton Saints	139	(145)
2018	Force	4	(0)
- Correct as of 13 March 2020
International career
Years	Team	Apps	(Points)
2006–2007	New Zealand U21	6	(5)
2010–2016	Samoa	21	(20)
- Correct as of 13 March 2020

George Pisi (born 29 June 1986 in Apia, Samoa) is a rugby union player for Samoa who will leave his current club Northampton Saints in the Aviva Premiership at the conclusion of the 2016/17 season.

Pisi was born in Samoa but moved to Auckland in New Zealand aged 3 with his family. He went to West Harbour Primary School and Massey High School where captained their rugby team, and represented New Zealand Schools.

Pisi made his provincial debut playing for North Harbour in 2005 alongside his elder brother Tusi Pisi. He made 50 appearances for North Harbour before transferring to Taranaki for the 2010 ITM Cup. He made 18 appearances for the Blues between 2006 and 2010, but didn't record a try and never fully established himself as a starter.

He moved to France in February 2011 as a medical joker for Gavin Williams, and then moved on to sign for Northampton for the 2011/12 season, and was named in the Aviva Premiership Dream Team during his first season at the club. In 2014 Pisi started and scored a try as Northampton beat Saracens to win the Premiership.

He played for New Zealand at U19 and U21 level, but made his debut for Samoa in June 2010 in the Pacific Nations Cup, and went on to play in the 2011 Rugby World Cup.

Both his brothers, Tusi Pisi and Ken Pisi, also are professional rugby players and went to Massey High School and played for North Harbour and in 2012 Ken joined George at Northampton.

It was announced on Monday, May 8, 2017 that Pisi would leave Northampton Saints at the conclusion of the 2016/17 season.
