= Ellis Shipp (rugby union) =

Welsh rugby union footballer

- Born: Ellis Shipp; 14 August 1997 (age 29) Abergavenny, Wales
- Height: 179 cm (5 ft 10 in)
- Weight: 108 kg (17 st 0 lb)
- School: Coleg Gwent

Rugby union career
- Position: Hooker
- Current team: Dragons
Senior career
Years	Team	Apps	(Points)
2016-	Dragons	29	(10)
- Correct as of 14 March 2021

Ellis Shipp (born 14 August 1997) is a Welsh rugby union player and professional rugby player who plays for Newport Gwent Dragons regional team as a hooker having previously played for Cross Keys RFC and Bedwas RFC
