= Dewi Cross =

Welsh rugby union player

- Full name: Dewi Cross
- Born: 6 December 1999 (age 26) Bridgend, Wales
- Height: 179 cm (5 ft 10 in)
- Weight: 73 kg (11 st 7 lb; 161 lb)
- School: Ysgol Llanhari
- Notable relative: Cross

Rugby union career
- Position: Wing
- Current team: Cardiff Rugby
Youth career
- Pencoed
Senior career
Years	Team	Apps	(Points)
2018-	Ospreys	4	(5)

Dewi Cross (born 6 December 1999) is a Welsh rugby union player who plays for Cardiff RFC as a winger.

Cross made his debut for the Ospreys in 2018 against Gloucester having previously played for the Ospreys academy.
