= Dan Babos =

- Born: Daniel Babos; 1 March 2000 (age 26) Newport, Wales
- Height: 170.18 cm (5 ft 7.00 in)
- Weight: 78 kg (12 st 4 lb)

Rugby union career
- Current team: Cross Keys RFC
Youth career
- Pontypool United RFC
Senior career
| Years | Team | Apps | (Points) |
| 2017–2022 | Dragons | 18 | (5) |
| 2022 | Coventry | 7 | (5) |
| 2022– | Pontypool RFC | | |
- Correct as of 6 February 2023
International career
| Years | Team | Apps | (Points) |
| 2018–2019 | Wales U20 | 4 | (0) |
- Correct as of 6 February 2023

Dan Babos (born 1 March 2000) is a Welsh rugby union player who plays for Cross Keys as a scrum-half.

Having begun his career playing for Pontypool schools and Pontypool United RFC, Babos made his debut for the Dragons regional team in 2017. With his appearance he became the first player born in the 21st century to appear in the Pro14 competition. His half-back partner that day, former Wales international Gavin Henson, had made his own professional debut in 2001 when Babos was just six months old.

He has also represented Wales under-20.

In 2022, Babos joined Coventry R.F.C. on loan.

Babos was released by the Dragons at the end of the 2021–2022 season, and joined Pontypool RFC.
