= Ifan Phillips =

Welsh rugby union player

- Full name: Ifan Phillips
- Born: 29 January 1996 (age 30) Wales
- Height: 181 cm (5 ft 11 in)
- Weight: 105 kg (231 lb)
- School: Coleg Sir Gâr
- Notable relative: Kevin Phillips (father)

Rugby union career
- Position: Hooker
Senior career
Years	Team	Apps	(Points)
2017–2021	Ospreys	40	(35)
2020	→ Scarlets (loan)	2	(0)
International career
Years	Team	Apps	(Points)
2016	Wales U20	2	(0)
- Correct as of 8 December 2021

Ifan Phillips (born 29 January 1996) is a Welsh rugby union player who played for the Ospreys as a hooker. He is a Wales under-20 international and was part of the squad that achieved the Grand Slam in the 2016 Six Nations Under 20s Championship.

Phillips made his debut for the Ospreys in 2017 having previously played for the club's academy, Carmarthen Quins and Neath RFC.

Phillips was involved in a serious motorbike accident in December 2021, as a result of which one of his legs was amputated, effectively ending his rugby career. Since retiring from playing rugby, Phillips has worked as a pundit and commentator as well as coaching for his former junior club side Crymych RFC.

A Welsh-language TV documentary following Phillips' recovery and rehabilitation after the accident, Y Cam Nesaf, won the award for best sports documentary at the 2024 RTS Wales Awards.
