= Josh Ibuanokpe =

English rugby union prop

- Born: Joshua Carlton Eserovweoghene E.A. Ibuanokpe; 16 January 1996 (age 30) Lambeth, Greater London, England
- Height: 6 ft 3 in (1.91 m)
- Weight: 20 st 8 lb (131 kg)
- School: Dulwich College
- University: University of Bristol

Rugby union career
- Position: Tighthead Prop
- Current team: Saracens
Senior career
Years	Team	Apps	(Points)
2014–2016	Worthing	12	(5)
2015–2016	Clifton	14	(0)
2016–2017	Hartpury	7	(5)
2017–2019	Harlequins	10	(10)
2019–	Saracens	11	(0)
- Correct as of 2 April 2020

Joshua Carlton Eserovweoghene E.A. Ibuanokpe (born 16 January 1996) is an English rugby union prop for Saracens in Premiership Rugby.

== Career ==
Ibuanokpe made his debut for Harlequins on 5 November 2017 in an Anglo-Welsh Cup game against Saracens, Ibuanokpe scored the winning try. Ibuanokpe renewed his Harlequins contract on 23 February 2018.

On 30 April 2019 Ibuanokpe signed for Saracens.

Ibuanokpe graduated from the University of Bristol with a degree in Physics in July 2019.
