= Anthony Tuitavake =

NZ international rugby union player

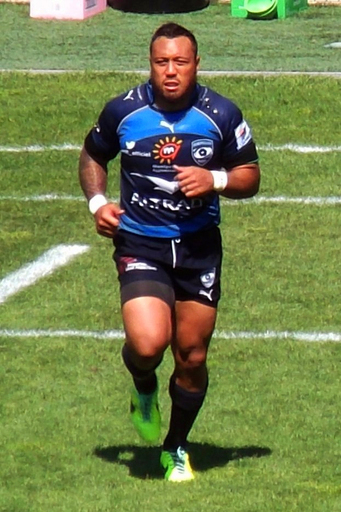
- Born: Anthony Tuitavake; 12 February 1982 (age 44) Auckland, New Zealand
- Height: 1.82 m (6 ft 0 in)
- Weight: 94 kg (207 lb)
- School: Massey High School
- Notable relative(s): Nafi Tuitavake, Brother

Rugby union career
- Position(s): Centre, Wing
Senior career
Years	Team	Apps	(Points)
2010–2013	NEC Green Rockets	37	(30)
2013-2016	Montpellier	72	(10)
2016-	Racing 92	19	(5)
Provincial / State sides
Years	Team	Apps	(Points)
2001–2009	North Harbour	82	(140)
Super Rugby
Years	Team	Apps	(Points)
2005	Highlanders	10	(0)
2006–2010	Blues	45	(80)
International career
Years	Team	Apps	(Points)
2008	New Zealand	6	(5)
National sevens team
Years	Team		Comps
2002	New Zealand		
Medal record
Men's rugby sevens
Representing New Zealand
Commonwealth Games
Gold medal – first place	2002 Manchester	Team competition

Anthony Tuitavake (born 12 February 1982 in Auckland) is a New Zealand rugby union footballer. He plays as a centre or on the wing. Tuitavake, of Tongan descent, is a fast attacking centre.

== Career ==
He had a great season in 2005 for both the Highlanders (Super 12) and North Harbour (National Provincial Championship), before being signed by the Blues in 2006, with whom he remained until 2009.

He played for the world champion New Zealand Under 19 side in 2001 and for the New Zealand Under 21 team in 2002. Tuitavake is also a former New Zealand Sevens representative, winning a Commonwealth Games gold medal in 2002 in Manchester and then a world title the following year. Tuitavake was named in the 2008 All Blacks squad, making him All Black number 1072. He made his All Black debut, starting in the 14 jersey, on 7 June against Ireland.

In 2009, Tuitavake signed a two-year deal with Japanese club NEC Green Rockets, with whom he debuted in the 2010–11 season. In 2013, Tuitavake signed up with top French club Montpellier for the 2013–14 season. In the summer of 2016, he joined the Top 14 side Racing 92.

== Honours ==
- 2015–16 European Rugby Challenge Cup : winner (Montpellier Herault Rugby).
