= Ken Pisi =

Samoa international rugby union player

- Born: Kenneth Siaosi Pisi; 24 February 1989 (age 37) Apia, Samoa
- Height: 1.83 m (6 ft 0 in)
- Weight: 87 kg (13 st 10 lb; 192 lb)

Rugby union career
- Position: Wing
- Current team: Northampton Saints
Senior career
| Years | Team | Apps | (Points) |
| 2009–11 | North Harbour | 25 | (15) |
| 2012– | Northampton Saints | 118 | (140) |
- Correct as of 6 June 2017
International career
| Years | Team | Apps | (Points) |
| 2012- | Samoa | 13 | (0) |
- Correct as of 16 June 2017

Ken Siaosi Pisi (born 24 February 1989 in Apia, Samoa) is a former rugby union player for Northampton Saints in the Aviva Premiership and the Samoa national rugby union team.

Both his brothers, Tusi Pisi and George Pisi, also are professional rugby players and went to Massey High School and played for North Harbour and in 2012 Ken joined George at Northampton Saints.

While with Saints, Pisi has played in the 2014 European Rugby Challenge Cup Final where the Northampton side lifted the trophy after beating Bath Rugby 30–16 at Cardiff Arms Park. He also started as Northampton beat Saracens to win the Premiership.

Previously a part of the Samoa Sevens Squad, Pisi made his Samoa senior debut in 2012 as the country faced Tonga and has since racked up a number of appearances for his country including representing Samoa at the 2015 Rugby World Cup.

Most recently, Pisi has been called up to the Samoa squad for the 2017 summer internationals alongside fellow Northampton Saints back Ahsee Tuala.
