= Sam Moore (rugby union) =

- Born: Samuel James Moore; 9 September 1998 (age 28) Cardiff, Wales
- Height: 1.98 m (6 ft 6 in)
- Weight: 110 kg (17 st 5 lb)
- School: Merchant Taylors' School; Sedbergh School. Cumbria

Rugby union career
- Position: Number 8
Senior career
Years	Team	Apps	(Points)
2017–2019	Sale Sharks	5	(5)
2019–2022	Cardiff Rugby	8	(0)
2022–2023	Ospreys	0	(0)
- Correct as of 12 October 2022
International career
Years	Team	Apps	(Points)
2018	England U20	5	(0)

Sam Moore (born 9 September 1998) is a retired rugby union player. A Number 8, Moore played for Sale Sharks and Cardiff Rugby.

== Club career ==
Moore joined the Sale Sharks Academy in 2016. In July 2017 he was awarded his first professional contract, a five-year deal starting from the 2017–18 season. In October 2017, Moore made his senior debut for Sale Sharks against Lyon in the European Challenge Cup.

Moore joined the Ospreys during the 2021–2022 season. He ultimately did not make an appearance for the team.

== International career ==
Moore is the son of former Wales player Steve Moore and the nephew of Andy Moore, who also played for Wales between 1995 and 2002. As his father was born in England, Moore is eligible to play for them in addition to being eligible to play for Wales where he was born.

Moore has elected to play for England at under-16, under-17, under-18 and under-19 level. Moore represented the England U20 side in the 2018 Six Nations Under 20s Championship. He was ruled out of the 2018 World Rugby Under 20 Championship due to injury. In February 2018, Moore was included in the England senior team squad for the first time.

Under current World Rugby regulations, Moore remains eligible to play for either the England or Wales senior teams.
