= Nafi Tuitavake =

Tonga international rugby union player

- Born: 21 January 1989 (age 37) Auckland, New Zealand
- Height: 1.80 m (5 ft 11 in)
- Weight: 95 kg (14 st 13 lb; 209 lb)
- School: Massey High School
- Notable relative: Anthony Tuitavake (brother)

Rugby union career
- Position(s): Centre, Wing
- Current team: Blue Bulls
Senior career
Years	Team	Apps	(Points)
2012–2013	Agen	11	(0)
2016–	Northampton Saints	15	(10)
- Correct as of 7 June 2017
Provincial / State sides
Years	Team	Apps	(Points)
2008–2014	North Harbour	76	(115)
- Correct as of 7 June 2017
Super Rugby
Years	Team	Apps	(Points)
2014	Crusaders	20	(5)
- Correct as of 7 June 2017
International career
Years	Team	Apps	(Points)
2016-	Tonga	13	(0)
- Correct as of 11 September 2019
National sevens team
Years	Team		Comps
2008	New Zealand		

Nafi Tuitavake (born 21 January 1989) is a New Zealand Rugby union player who plays for the Vodacom Blue Bulls in the Super rugby competition. He is the younger brother of former All Black winger Anthony Tuitavake.

He was named in the Crusaders five-man wider training group for 2014.

On 21 September 2016, Nafi sign professional contract with English club Northampton Saints in the Aviva Premiership from the 2016–17 season.

Tuitavake made some good appearances in Saints' second side the Northampton Wanderers, before being drafted into the first team as the wider squad suffered with injuries. The Tonga centre thrived and secured a place in the first team quickly and most recently helped his side secure European Champions Cup rugby for the 2017/18 season as the side beat Stade Français Paris by just one point.

Tuitavake will travel with Tonga for their 2017 summer internationals, battling with fellow Pacific Island nations, and Saints teammates, for a Rugby World Cup qualification for the 2019 competition. At the end of the 2018/19 season, Tuitivake was released by the Northampton Saints.

He gained selection to the 2019 Rugby World Cup in Japan and made just one appearance, against England, before being sent home with a fractured arm.

== Career highlights ==
- North Harbour ITM CUP 2010
- New Zealand U20 2009
- New Zealand Sevens 2008
- North Harbour U21 2007
- North Harbour U19 2006
- North Harbour U16 2005
