= List of 2020–21 RFU Championship transfers =

This is a list of player transfers involving RFU Championship teams before or during the 2020–21 season. The list is of deals that are confirmed and are either from or to a rugby union team in the Championship during the 2019–20 season. It is not unknown for confirmed deals to be cancelled at a later date. On 2 April 2020, Newcastle Falcons are automatically promoted back to Premiership Rugby to replace relegated Saracens under RFU's 'best record playing formula' and due to the COVID-19 pandemic. Leeds Tykes are relegated to National League 1 and are replaced by promoted Richmond for the 2020–21 season.

== Ampthill ==
=== Players In ===
- (England) Charlie Beckett from (England) Gloucester
- (England) James Flynn from (England) Leeds Tykes
- (England) Jamie Jack from (England) Nottingham
- (Wales) Llewelyn Jones from (England) Nottingham
- (Wales) Alex Humfrey from (England) Leeds Tykes
- (England) Corey Lewis from (Wales) Cardiff Metropolitan University RFC
- (England) Matt Marsh from (Wales) Cardiff Metropolitan University RFC
- (Wales) Joe Roberts from (Wales) Scarlets (short-term loan)
- (Switzerland) Jeremy To'a from (England) Sale FC
- (Scotland) Devante Onojaife from (England) Northampton Saints
- (England) Kieran Frost from (England) Rotherham Titans
- (England) Tom Hudson from (England) Gloucester (season-long loan)

=== Players Out ===
- (Tonga) Maama Molitika retired
- (England) Shay Kerry to Jersey Reds
- (Tonga) Soane Tongaʻuiha to (England) Chinnor
- (England) Sam Hanks to (England) London Scottish
- (England) Rob Langley to (England) Cambridge
- (England) Darryl Veenendaal to (England) Cambridge
- (England) Kwaku Asiedu to (England) London Scottish

== Bedford Blues ==
=== Players In ===
- (New Zealand) Elijah Niko from (England) Ealing Trailfinders
- (England) Andre Robson from (England) Leeds Tykes
- (Ireland) Corrie Barrett from (Ireland) Munster
- (England) Ewan Fenley from (England) Ealing Trailfinders (season-long loan)
- (England) Oli Robinson from (England) Ealing Trailfinders (season-long loan)

=== Players Out ===
- (England) Sam Leeming to Jersey Reds
- (England) Ryan Hutler to Jersey Reds
- (United States) Will Hooley to (England) Saracens
- (England) Dean Adamson to (France) Rouen
- (Wales) Lewis Robling to (England) Blackheath
- (England) Ed Taylor to (England) Blackheath
- (England) Joe Green to (England) Cambridge
- (England) Josh Buggea to (England) Nottingham
- (Scotland) Robbie Smith to (England) Newcastle Falcons
- (Scotland) Grayson Hart released
- (New Zealand) Dan Temm released

== Cornish Pirates ==
=== Players In ===
- (England) Josh Caulfield from (England) Exeter Chiefs
- (England) James McRae from (England) Exeter Chiefs
- (England) Harry Bazalgette from (England) Exeter University
- (Wales) Luke Scully from (Wales) Cardiff Blues (season-long loan)
- (Wales) Arwel Robson from (Wales) Dragons (loan)

=== Players Out ===
- (England) Will Norton to (England) Plymouth Albion
- (Canada) Matt Evans retired
- (Canada) Brett Beukeboom retired
- (Scotland) Ruaridh Dawson released
- (Ireland) Cian Romaine released
- (England) Jack Clemson to (England) Plymouth Albion
- (England) Kyle Moyle to (England) Gloucester
- (New Zealand) Marlen Walker to (England) Wasps (short-term loan)
- (Wales) Alex Schwarz to (England) Wasps (short-term loan)
- (Argentina) Javier Rojas Alvarez released
- (England) Suva Ma'asi to (England) Coventry
- (England) Jay Tyack to (England) Worcester Warriors

== Coventry ==
=== Players In ===
- (England) Toby Trinder from (England) Northampton Saints
- (Wales) Rob Stevenson from (England) London Scottish
- (England) Alex Gibson from (England) Hartpury University
- (England) Keston Lines from (England) Leicester Tigers
- (England) Kalius Hutchinson promoted from Academy
- (England) James Martin promoted from Academy
- (England) Sam McNulty promoted from Academy
- Tom Emery from England Sevens
- (England) Josh Barton from (England) London Scottish
- (England) Nic Dolly from (England) Sale Sharks
- (England) Suva Ma'asi from (England) Cornish Pirates

=== Players Out ===
- (England) Heath Stevens retired
- (England) James Gibbons to (England) Ealing Trailfinders
- (England) Will Flinn to (England) Hartpury University
- (England) Scott Russell to (England) Hartpury University
- (Tonga) David Halaifonua to (England) London Scottish
- (Australia) Ben Adams to (England) Cambridge
- (England) Darren Dawidiuk released
- (Wales) Gerard Ellis released
- (England) David Langley to (England) Birmingham Moseley
- (England) Scott Tolmie released
- (England) Luke Wallace to (England) Leicester Tigers
- (England) Gareth Denman to (England) Doncaster Knights
- (England) Tom Kessell to (England) Bristol Bears
- (Tonga) Jack Ram to (United States) New England Free Jacks
- (England) Max Titchener to (England) Chinnor
- (England) Rory Jennings to (France) Clermont
- (England) James Voss to (France) Mont-de-Marsan
- (England) Jake Byrne to (England) Richmond
- (England) George Oram to (England) Richmond
- (England) Max Trimble to (England) Richmond
- (England) Nic Dolly to (England) Leicester Tigers

== Doncaster Knights ==
=== Players In ===
- (Australia) James Kane from (Australia) NSW Country Eagles
- (Ireland) Mark Best from Jersey Reds
- (England) James Mitchell from (England) Northampton Saints
- (Ireland) Conor Joyce from Jersey Reds
- (New Zealand) Tom Hill from (England) Nottingham
- (England) Sam Graham from (England) Bristol Bears
- (Wales) Billy McBryde from (Wales) RGC 1404
- (Ireland) James Newey from Jersey Reds
- (England) Jack Davies from (England) Bath
- (Wales) Joe Jones from (England) Sale Sharks
- (Wales) George Roberts from (Wales) RGC 1404
- (England) Jack Spittle from (England) Nottingham
- (England) Jack Rouse from (England) Ealing Trailfinders (season-long loan)
- (England) John Kelly from (England) Plymouth Albion
- (England) Gareth Denman from (England) Coventry
- (England) Harry Strong from (England) Nottingham
- (Ireland) Tom Bacon from (England) Wasps (season-long loan)
- (England) Will Britton from (England) Bath
- (Argentina) Guido Volpi from (Wales) Ospreys (season-long loan)
- (Ireland) Jerry Sexton from (South Africa) Southern Kings
- (Wales) Connor Edwards from (Wales) Dragons (season-long loan)

=== Players Out ===
- (England) Tom James to (England) Northampton Saints
- (England) George Edgson to Jersey Reds
- (Wales) Jack Roberts to Jersey Reds
- (England) Morgan Eames to (France) Beziers
- (Namibia) Wian Conradie to (United States) Dallas Jackals
- (England) Pete Lucock to (England) Newcastle Falcons
- (England) Curtis Wilson to (England) Nottingham
- (England) Tom Calladine to (England) Sheffield Tigers
- (England) Cameron Cowell released
- (England) Lloyd Hayes released
- (England) Tom Hicks retired
- (England) Michael Hills retired
- (Samoa) Penikolo Latu released
- (Scotland) Steve McColl released
- (Wales) Rory Pitman released
- (Wales) Dan Suter released
- (New Zealand) Tom Hill released
- (Scotland) Colin Quigley to (England) Rotherham Titans
- (Tonga) Fotu Lokotui to (Scotland) Glasgow Warriors
- (Tonga) Kurt Morath to (United States) Austin Gilgronis
- (England) Tyson Lewis retired

== Ealing Trailfinders ==
=== Players In ===
- (Ireland) Angus Kernohan from (Ireland) Ulster
- (England) Max Bodilly from (England) Exeter Chiefs
- (England) Simon Linsell from (England) Gloucester
- (England) Will Davis from (England) Northampton Saints
- (England) Luke Daniels from (England) Bristol Bears
- (England) Barney Maddison from (England) London Irish
- (England) James Gibbons from (England) Coventry
- (South Africa) Michael van Vuuren from (England) Northampton Saints
- (England) Lewis Thiede from (England) Bristol Bears
- (South Africa) Shaun Malton from (England) Bristol Bears
- (England) Simon Uzokwe from (England) Newcastle Falcons
- (England) Guy Thompson from (England) Leicester Tigers
- (South Africa) Dean Hammond from (England) Worcester Warriors
- (England) Charlie Walker from (Italy) Zebre
- (Scotland) Fraser Strachan from (England) Northampton Saints
- (England) Harry Dugmore promoted from Academy
- (England) Elliot Chilvers promoted from Academy
- (South Africa) Kyle Whyte from (England) London Scottish
- (England) Levi Davis from (England) Bath
- (South Africa) Abongile Nonkontwana from (South Africa) Bulls
- (South Africa) Bobby de Wee from (South Africa) Southern Kings
- (South Africa) Johannes Jonker from (South Africa) Lions
- (Scotland) Robert Beattie from (England) London Scottish
- (Australia) Matt Gordon from (Scotland) Edinburgh
- (Ireland) Bill Johnston from (Ireland) Ulster (short-term loan)
- (United States) Malon Al-Jiboori from (United States) San Diego Legion
- (England) Max Northcote-Green from (England) Exeter Chiefs (short-term deal)

=== Players Out ===
- (Australia) Jordy Reid to (England) Gloucester
- (Ireland) Pete Lydon to (France) Rouen
- (England) Tom Crozier released
- (England) Sam Dickinson released
- (England) Chester Duff released
- (New Zealand) Paul Grant released
- (England) Reon Joseph retired
- (United States) Andrew Durutalo to (United States) Seattle Seawolves
- (England) Harry Sloan to (England) Saracens
- (England) Jake Ellwood to (England) London Scottish
- (England) Alex Lundberg retired
- (England) Jack Rouse to (England) Doncaster Knights (season-long loan)
- (England) Harrison Obatoyinbo to (France) Toulon
- (South Africa) Jordan Els to (England) Harlequins
- (Ireland) Craig Trenier to (England) Harlequins
- (England) Lewis Jones to (England) Rosslyn Park
- (England) Seb Stegmann to (England) Rosslyn Park
- (England) Matt Cornish to (England) London Irish
- (England) Ryan Roach to (England) Birmingham Moseley
- (England) Tommy Bell to (Singapore) Asia Pacific Dragons
- (New Zealand) Elijah Niko to (England) Bedford Blues
- (England) Ewan Fenley to (England) Bedford Blues (season-long loan)
- (England) Oli Robinson to (England) Bedford Blues (season-long loan)
- (Ireland) Ben Betts to (England) Nottingham

== Hartpury University ==
=== Players In ===
- (England) Shaun Knight from (France) Rouen
- (England) Ehize Ehizode from (England) Chinnor
- (England) Will Flinn from (England) Coventry
- (England) Ben Foley from (England) Nottingham
- (South Africa) Cameron Holenstein from (England) Old Elthamians
- (England) Dale Lemon from (England) Cinderford
- (England) Wil Partington from (England) London Irish
- (England) Scott Russell from (England) Coventry
- (England) Luke Stratford from (England) Clifton
- (Wales) Aled Ward from (Wales) Cardiff Metropolitan University
- (England) Calum Waters from (England) University of Bristol
- (England) James Williams from (England) Sale Sharks
- (England) Nick Selway from (England) London Scottish

=== Players Out ===
- (England) Rupert Harden retired
- (England) Jake Henry to (France) Havre
- (England) Tom Jubb retired
- (England) Elias Caven to (Scotland) Ayr
- (Scotland) Harry Cochrane released
- (England) Mike Flook released
- (England) Joe Margetts to (Scotland) Ayr
- (Ireland) Des Merrey released
- (England) Jack Preece to (England) Cinderford
- (England) Will Tanner released
- (England) Mike Wilcox to (England) Cinderford
- (England) Luke Carter to (England) London Scottish
- (England) Mat Gilbert to (England) Cinderford
- (Fiji) Akapusi Qera to (England) Newport
- (England) Alex Gibson to (England) Coventry

== Jersey Reds ==
=== Players In ===
- (England) Ollie Dawe from (England) Bristol Bears
- (England) Jack Higgins from (England) Plymouth Albion
- (England) Ciaran Parker from (Ireland) Munster
- (England) George Edgson from (England) Doncaster Knights
- (England) Zak Farrance from (France) Oyonnax
- (England) Shay Kerry from (England) Ampthill
- (Ireland) Seán O'Connor from (Ireland) Munster
- (Scotland) Lewis Wynne from (England) London Scottish
- (Australia) Michael Dowsett from (Japan) Canon Eagles
- (England) James Elliott from (England) Leeds Tykes
- (England) Sam Leeming from (England) Bedford Blues
- (Australia) Kurt Heatherley from (New Zealand) Auckland
- (England) Ryan Hutler from (England) Bedford Blues
- (Namibia) Lesley Klim from (Wales) Ospreys
- (Wales) Jack Roberts from (England) Doncaster Knights
- (England) Harry Doolan from Jersey Athletic
- (Wales) Macauley Cook from (Wales) Cardiff Blues
- (England) Dan Barnes from (England) London Scottish
- (England) Tim Grey from (Wales) RGC 1404
- (England) Cameron Nordli-Kelemeti from (England) Newcastle Falcons (season-long loan)
- (South Africa) Bader Pretorius from (South Africa) Southern Kings
- (South Africa) Scott van Breda from (England) Worcester Warriors (short-term loan)
- (England) Darren Atkins from (England) Bath (season-long loan)
- (England) Max Green from (England) Bath (season-long loan)
- (Ireland) Eoghan Clarke from (Ireland) Munster
- (Scotland) Adam Nicol from (Scotland) Glasgow Warriors
- (England) James Scott from (England) Worcester Warriors (season-long loan)

=== Players Out ===
- (England) Aaron Penberthy retired
- (Fiji) Lee Roy Atalifo to (Scotland) Edinburgh
- (New Zealand) Leroy Van Dam to (France) Aurillac
- (England) George Wilmott released
- (Ireland) Mark Best to (England) Doncaster Knights
- (Ireland) Conor Joyce to (England) Doncaster Knights
- (England) Augustin Slowik to (France) Nice
- (Ireland) James Newey to (England) Doncaster Knights
- (Ireland) Jack Stapley to (England) Nottingham
- (England) Harry Morley to (England) London Scottish
- (New Zealand) Liam Howley to (New Zealand) Southland
- (England) Alec Clarey to (England) Saracens
- (Namibia) Janco Venter to (England) Saracens
- (Samoa) Rodney Iona to (Australia) Gordon
- (England) Will Homer to (Wales) Scarlets
- (Australia) James Wayland released
- (New Zealand) Greg Dyer to (New Zealand) Southland
- (New Zealand) Liam Hallam-Eames to (New Zealand) Auckland
- (Australia) Jake Upfield to (Australia) Bond University
- (Wales) Luc Jones to (England) Richmond
- (South Africa) Kyle Hatherell to (England) Worcester Warriors

== London Scottish ==
=== Players In ===
- (England) Toby Freeman from (England) Harlequins
- (England) Luke Carter from (England) Hartpury University
- (England) Brian Tuilagi from (Italy) Mogliano
- (England) Fred Tuilagi from (Italy) Colorno
- (England) Jake Ellwood from (England) Ealing Trailfinders
- (England) Harry Morley from Jersey Reds
- (England) Curtis Reynolds from (Wales) Pontypridd
- (Scotland) James Tyas from (England) Chinnor
- (Tonga) David Halaifonua from (England) Coventry
- (Wales) Joe Rees from (England) Chinnor
- (England) Nick Selway from (England) Chinnor
- (England) Laurence May from (England) Chinnor
- (England) Sam Hanks from (England) Ampthill
- (Scotland) Sam Yawayawa from (England) Cambridge
- (Wales) Ryan Crowley from (England) British Army
- (Fiji) Josh Daventanivalu from (England) British Army
- Jack Parfitt from Hong Kong Scottish (season-long loan)
- (England) Noah Ferdinand from (England) Tonbridge Juddians
- (England) Cameron McDonald from (England) Clifton
- (England) Mike McDonald from (England) British Army
- (England) Tom Petty from (England) Bishop's Stortford
- (England) Kwaku Asiedu from (England) Ampthill
- (South Africa) Jason Worrall from (England) Chinnor
- (Scotland) Ben Manning from (England) Chinnor

=== Players Out ===
- (Australia) Matt Gordon to (Scotland) Edinburgh
- (Scotland) Lewis Wynne to Jersey Reds
- (England) Matas Jurevicius to (England) Harlequins
- (England) Elliott Creed to (England) Birmingham Moseley
- (England) Luke Hibberd to (England) Birmingham Moseley
- (England) Dan Barnes to Jersey Reds
- (South Africa) Kyle Whyte to (England) Ealing Trailfinders
- (Wales) Rob Stevenson to (England) Coventry
- (Scotland) James Malcolm to (United States) Dallas Jackals
- (England) Dean Squire to Hong Kong Scottish (season-long loan)
- (Scotland) Robert Beattie to (England) Ealing Trailfinders
- (England) Nick Selway to (England) Hartpury University
- (England) Josh Barton to (England) Coventry
- (England) Ben Christie to (England) Richmond
- (England) Jonny Harris to (England) Richmond
- (England) Luke Frost to (England) Nottingham

== Nottingham ==
=== Players In ===
- (Ireland) Jack Stapley from Jersey Reds
- (England) Carl Kirwan from (England) Chinnor
- (England) Owen Hills from (England) Leicester Tigers
- (England) Toby Williams from (England) Rotherham Titans
- (England) Matt Riddington from (England) Nottingham Trent University
- (England) Charlie Thacker unattached
- (Ireland) Willie Ryan from (England) Chinnor
- (England) Jack Ramshaw from (England) Chinnor
- (England) Josh Buggea from (England) Bedford Blues
- (England) Sam Hollingsworth from (England) Rotherham Titans
- (Ireland) Michael Stronge from (Ireland) Ballymena
- (England) Curtis Wilson from (England) Doncaster Knights
- (Ireland) Ben Betts from (England) Ealing Trailfinders
- (England) Luke Frost from (England) London Scottish
- (England) Ben Sugars from (England) Leeds Tykes
- (Wales) Shaun Evans to (Wales) Scarlets (season-long loan)
- (Wales) Harri O'Connor from (Wales) Scarlets (season-long loan)
- (Wales) Jac Price to (Wales) Scarlets (season-long loan)

=== Players Out ===
- (England) Oliver Chessum to (England) Leicester Tigers
- (Canada) Shane O'Leary to (France) Rouen
- (England) Ben Foley to (England) Hartpury University
- (New Zealand) Tom Hill to (England) Doncaster Knights
- (England) Jack Spittle to (England) Doncaster Knights
- (England) Harry Strong to (England) Doncaster Knights
- (England) Luke Peters to (England) Blackheath
- (England) Billy Walker to (England) Cambridge
- (Ireland) James Connolly to (France) Carcassonne
- (England) Ben Brownlie to (England) Cambridge
- (England) David Williams to (England) Leicester Tigers (season-long loan)
- (Ireland) Oisín Heffernan to (England) Northampton Saints
- (England) Jamie Jack to (England) Ampthill
- (Wales) Llewelyn Jones to (England) Ampthill

== Richmond ==
=== Players In ===
- (England) Hamish Barton from (England) Old Elthamians
- (England) Jake Byrne from (England) Coventry
- (England) Ben Christie from (England) London Scottish
- (England) Sam Collingridge from (England) London Irish
- (England) Chris Elder from (England) Chinnor
- (England) Alex Goble from (England) Old Elthamians
- (England) Jonny Harris from (England) London Scottish
- (England) Fred Hosking from (England) Old Elthamians
- (Wales) Luc Jones from Jersey Reds
- (England) Will Kaye from (England) Loughborough Students RUFC
- (England) Ted Landray from (England) Old Elthamians
- (England) George Oram from (England) Coventry
- (England) Callum Watson from (England) Chinnor
- (England) Max Trimble from (England) Coventry

=== Players Out ===
- (England) Jamie Gibbs retired
- (South Africa) Harry Edwards retired

== Saracens ==
=== Players In ===
- (England) Joel Kpoku promoted from Academy
- (Wales) Aled Davies from (Wales) Ospreys
- (Scotland) Callum Hunter-Hill from (Scotland) Edinburgh
- (Scotland) Tim Swinson from (Scotland) Glasgow Warriors
- (United States) Will Hooley from (England) Bedford Blues
- (England) Harry Sloan from (England) Ealing Trailfinders
- (England) Sean Reffell promoted from Academy
- (England) Alec Clarey from Jersey Reds
- (Namibia) Janco Venter from Jersey Reds
- (England) Manu Vunipola promoted from Academy
- (Argentina) Juan Pablo Socino from (Spain) El Salvador
- (England) Andy Christie promoted from Academy
- (England) Elliott Obatoyinbo promoted from Academy
- (United States) Kapeli Pifeleti promoted from Academy
- (Wales) Ethan Lewis from (Wales) Cardiff Blues (season-long loan)
- (England) Toby Salmon from (England) Newcastle Falcons (season-long loan)
- (England) Alex Goode returned from (Japan) NEC Green Rockets

=== Players Out ===
- (England) Matt Gallagher to (Ireland) Munster
- (United States) Titi Lamositele to (France) Montpellier
- (England) Ben Earl to (England) Bristol Bears (season-long loan)
- (England) Max Malins to (England) Bristol Bears (season-long loan)
- (England) Jack Singleton to (England) Gloucester
- (England) Joe Gray to (England) Harlequins
- (England) George Kruis to (Japan) Panasonic Wild Knights
- (England) Nick Isiekwe to (England) Northampton Saints (season-long loan)
- (England) Ben Spencer to (England) Bath
- (England) Alex Lozowski to (France) Montpellier (season-long loan)
- (Australia) Will Skelton to (France) La Rochelle
- (Wales) Nick Tompkins to (Wales) Dragons (season-long loan)
- (England) Brad Barritt retired
- (Wales) Rhys Carré to (Wales) Cardiff Blues
- (Tonga) Viliami Hakalo retired
- (England) Alex Goode to (Japan) NEC Green Rockets (season-long loan)
- (England) Tobias Munday released
- (England) Richard Wigglesworth to (England) Leicester Tigers
- (Argentina) Juan Figallo retired

== See also ==
- List of 2020–21 Premiership Rugby transfers
- List of 2020–21 Pro14 transfers
- List of 2020–21 Super Rugby transfers
- List of 2020–21 Top 14 transfers
- List of 2020–21 Major League Rugby transfers
