= List of 2020–21 Premiership Rugby transfers =

This is a list of player transfers involving Premiership Rugby teams before or during the 2020–21 season. The list is of deals that are confirmed and are either from or to a rugby union team in the Premiership during the 2019–20 season. It is not unknown for confirmed deals to be cancelled at a later date. On 19 January 2020, Saracens are automatically relegated to the RFU Championship due to salary cap breaches. On 2 April 2020, Newcastle Falcons were automatically promoted back to the Premiership to replace relegated Saracens under the RFU's 'best record playing formula' and due to the COVID-19 pandemic.

== Bath ==
=== Players In ===
- (England) Gabriel Hamer-Webb promoted from Academy
- (South Africa) Juan Schoeman from (South Africa) Sharks
- (England) Ben Spencer from (England) Saracens
- (England) Will Spencer from (England) Leicester Tigers
- Will Muir from England Sevens
- (England) Alex Gray from (United States) Atlanta Falcons
- (Scotland) Jamie Bhatti from (Scotland) Edinburgh
- (South Africa) Tian Schoeman from (South Africa) Cheetahs
- (South Africa) Jacques du Toit from (South Africa) Cheetahs
- (South Africa) Jaco Coetzee from (South Africa) Stormers
- (England) Danny Cipriani from (England) Gloucester

=== Players Out ===
- (England) Sam Nixon to (France) Bayonne
- (Wales) Rhys Webb to (Wales) Ospreys
- (Wales) Rhys Davies to (Wales) Ospreys
- (South Africa) Francois Louw retired
- (England) Freddie Burns to (Japan) Toyota Industries Shuttles
- (England) Chris Cook to (England) Bristol Bears
- (New Zealand) Jackson Willison to (France) Soyaux Angoulême
- (Argentina) Lucas Noguera Paz released
- (England) Jack Davies to (England) Doncaster Knights
- (England) Tom Homer to (England) London Irish
- (England) Alex Davies to (England) Rosslyn Park
- (England) Levi Davis to (England) Ealing Trailfinders
- (Wales) Aled Brew to (Wales) Scarlets
- (England) Matt Garvey to (England) Gloucester
- (England) Nathan Catt retired
- (England) Levi Douglas to (England) Wasps
- (England) Will Britton to (England) Doncaster Knights
- (England) Darren Atkins to Jersey Reds (season-long loan)
- (England) Max Green to Jersey Reds (season-long loan)

== Bristol Bears ==
=== Players In ===
- (Fiji) Semi Radradra from (France) Bordeaux
- (England) Kyle Sinckler from (England) Harlequins
- (Scotland) Mitch Eadie from (England) Northampton Saints
- (England) Ben Earl from (England) Saracens (season-long loan)
- (England) Max Malins from (England) Saracens (season-long loan)
- (England) Chris Cook from (England) Bath
- (Fiji) Ratu Naulago from (England) Hull FC
- (England) Will Capon promoted from Academy
- (England) James Dun promoted from Academy
- (England) Charlie Powell promoted from Academy
- (Ireland) Bryan Byrne from (Ireland) Leinster
- (England) Tom Kessell from (England) Coventry
- (Ireland) Niyi Adeolokun from (Ireland) Connacht
- (Ireland) Peter McCabe from (Ireland) Connacht
- (Argentina) Nahuel Tetaz Chaparro from (Argentina) Jaguares
- (Ireland) Stephen Kerins from (Ireland) Connacht (short-term loan)
- (Scotland) Jake Kerr from (England) Leicester Tigers

=== Players Out ===
- (England) Jordan Crane retired
- (England) Aly Muldowney retired
- (Wales) Mat Protheroe to (Wales) Ospreys
- (Wales) Nicky Thomas to (Wales) Ospreys
- (Ireland) Ian Madigan to (Ireland) Ulster
- (Australia) Nic Stirzaker to (France) Montauban
- (England) Joe Batley to (England) Worcester Warriors
- (England) Tom Lindsay retired
- (England) Ryan Edwards released
- (South Africa) Luke Daniels to (England) Ealing Trailfinders
- (England) Ollie Dawe to Jersey Reds
- (England) Lewis Thiede to (England) Ealing Trailfinders
- (England) Sam Graham to (England) Doncaster Knights
- (South Africa) Shaun Malton to (England) Ealing Trailfinders
- (Scotland) Luke Hamilton to (France) Oyonnax
- (Wales) Kieron Assiratti returned to (Wales) Cardiff Blues
- (New Zealand) Adrian Choat to (New Zealand) Auckland
- (Samoa) James Lay to (New Zealand) Auckland
- (Samoa) Jordan Lay to (New Zealand) Bay of Plenty
- (England) Freddie Owsley to (Scotland) Edinburgh

== Exeter Chiefs ==
=== Players In ===
- (Scotland) Jonny Gray from (Scotland) Glasgow Warriors
- (Scotland) Sam Hidalgo-Clyne from (France) Lyon
- (England) Aaron Hinkley from (England) Gloucester
- (Wales) Corey Baldwin from (Wales) Scarlets
- (England) Josh Hodge from (England) Newcastle Falcons
- (Australia) Jack Walsh from (Australia) NSW Waratahs
- (Argentina) Facundo Cordero from (Argentina) Ceibos
- (South Africa) Maks van Dyk from (England) Harlequins
- (England) Max Northcote-Green from (England) London Royals

=== Players Out ===
- (Australia) Nic White to (Australia) Brumbies
- (Argentina) Enrique Pieretto to (Scotland) Glasgow Warriors
- (England) Sam Hill to (England) Sale Sharks
- (England) Matt Kvesic to (England) Worcester Warriors
- (England) Josh Caulfield to (England) Cornish Pirates
- (England) James McRae to (England) Cornish Pirates
- (England) Max Bodilly to (England) Ealing Trailfinders
- (Australia) Greg Holmes to (Australia) Western Force
- (Wales) Phil Dollman retired
- (Ireland) Gareth Steenson retired
- (England) Flynn Elworthy released
- (England) Sam Morley released
- (Italy) Pierre Thompson released
- (England) Pete Laverick to (Hong Kong) Valley
- (England) Stan South to (France) Brive
- (Australia) Dave Dennis to (United States) LA Giltinis
- (South Africa) Maks van Dyk to (England) Worcester Warriors (short-term loan)
- (South Africa) Maks van Dyk to (France) Pau (short-term deal)
- (England) Max Northcote-Green to (England) Ealing Trailfinders (short-term deal)

== Gloucester ==
=== Players In ===
- (Wales) Louis Rees-Zammit promoted from Academy
- (Australia) Jordy Reid from (England) Ealing Trailfinders
- (England) Jack Singleton from (England) Saracens
- (England) Jonny May from (England) Leicester Tigers
- (Argentina) Matías Alemanno from (Argentina) Jaguares
- (England) Cameron Jordan from (England) Leicester Tigers
- (England) Matt Garvey from (England) Bath
- (England) Kyle Moyle from (England) Cornish Pirates
- (England) Jay Tyack from (England) Cornish Pirates (short-term loan)
- (England) Jamie Gibson from (England) Northampton Saints
- (Scotland) Ollie Atkins from (Australia) Western Force
- (Argentina) Santiago Carreras from (Argentina) Jaguares
- (Georgia (country)) Giorgi Kveseladze from (Georgia (country)) Armanzi Marneuli
- (England) Seb Nagle-Taylor from (England) Hartpury University (short-term loan)
- (Argentina) Santiago Socino from (Argentina) Jaguares
- (Ireland) Conor Maguire from (Wales) Dragons

=== Players Out ===
- (Italy) Callum Braley to (Italy) Benetton
- (England) Aaron Hinkley to (England) Exeter Chiefs
- (England) Simon Linsell to (England) Ealing Trailfinders
- (South Africa) Franco Marais to (Japan) NTT DoCoMo Red Hurricanes
- (New Zealand) Tom Marshall to (Japan) NTT DoCoMo Red Hurricanes
- (Wales) Owen Williams to (Japan) NTT DoCoMo Red Hurricanes
- (South Africa) Franco Mostert to (Japan) Honda Heat
- (South Africa) Gerbrandt Grobler to (France) Stade Français
- (South Africa) Ruan Dreyer to (South Africa) Lions
- (Wales) Harry Fry to (Wales) Dragons
- (New Zealand) Josh Hohneck to (New Zealand) Otago
- (England) Danny Drake returned to (Wales) Scarlets
- (Samoa) Logovi'i Mulipola returned to (England) Newcastle Falcons
- (England) Charlie Beckett to (England) Ampthill
- (Australia) James Hanson to (Australia) Melbourne Rebels
- (England) Tom Hudson to (England) Ampthill (season-long loan)
- (England) Danny Cipriani to (England) Bath
- (South Africa) Corné Fourie released
- (England) Henry Trinder to (France) Vannes
- (England) Todd Gleave to (Wales) Ospreys (season-long loan)

== Harlequins ==
=== Players In ===
- (South Africa) Andre Esterhuizen from (South Africa) Sharks
- (South Africa) Wilco Louw from (South Africa) Stormers
- (England) Joe Gray from (England) Saracens
- (South Africa) Tyrone Green from (South Africa) Lions
- (England) Joe Marchant returned from (New Zealand) Blues
- (England) Matas Jurevicius from (England) London Scottish
- (South Africa) Jordan Els from (England) Ealing Trailfinders
- (Scotland) Scott Steele from (England) London Irish
- (Ireland) Craig Trenier from (England) Ealing Trailfinders
- (Scotland) Mak Wilson from (Scotland) Southern Knights
- (New Zealand) Lewis Gjaltema from (New Zealand) North Harbour
- Will Edwards from England Sevens (short-term deal)
- Richard de Carpentier from England Sevens (short-term deal)
- (England) Luke Wallace from (England) Leicester Tigers

=== Players Out ===
- (England) Nick Auterac to (England) Northampton Saints
- (England) Kyle Sinckler to (England) Bristol Bears
- (England) Phil Swainston to (France) Rouen
- (New Zealand) Francis Saili to (France) Biarritz
- (South Africa) Travis Ismaiel to (South Africa) Bulls
- (England) Toby Freeman to (England) London Scottish
- (Fiji) Semi Kunatani to (France) Castres
- (England) Rob Buchanan retired
- (England) Chris Robshaw to (United States) San Diego Legion
- (England) Max Crumpton retired
- (Fiji) Vereniki Goneva to (France) Mont-de-Marsan
- (England) Mark Lambert retired
- (Namibia) Renaldo Bothma released
- (England) James Bourton released
- (England) Luke James released
- (Ireland) Niall Saunders retired
- (England) Lloyd Wheeldon released
- (England) Gabriel Ibitoye to (France) Agen
- Harry Barlow to (United States) New England Free Jacks
- (England) Jack Clifford retired
- (England) Tom Penny to (England) Newcastle Falcons
- (Wales) Marc Thomas to (England) Worcester Warriors
- (South Africa) Maks van Dyk to (England) Exeter Chiefs
- (England) Chris Ashton to (England) Worcester Warriors

== Leicester Tigers ==
=== Players In ===
- (England) Zack Henry from (France) Nevers
- (Georgia (country)) Shalva Mamukashvili from (Russia) Ensei-STM
- (Fiji) Nemani Nadolo from (France) Montpellier
- (South Africa) Cyle Brink from (South Africa) Lions
- (England) Ollie Chessum from (England) Nottingham
- (Ireland) Dan Kelly from (England) Loughborough Students
- (Scotland) Cameron Henderson from (Scotland) Glasgow Warriors
- (Scotland) Matt Scott from (Scotland) Edinburgh
- (England) Harry Potter from (Australia) Melbourne Rebels
- (Australia) Blake Enever from (Australia) Brumbies
- (Argentina) Matías Moroni from (Argentina) Jaguares
- (Fiji) Kini Murimurivalu from (France) La Rochelle
- (England) Guy Porter from (Australia) Brumbies
- (South Africa) Kobus van Wyk from (New Zealand) Hurricanes
- (England) Luke Wallace from (England) Coventry
- (South Africa) Jasper Wiese from (South Africa) Cheetahs
- (England) Ryan Bower from (England) Worcester Warriors
- (Argentina) Joaquín Díaz Bonilla from (Argentina) Jaguares
- (England) Richard Wigglesworth from (England) Saracens
- (South Africa) Luan de Bruin from (South Africa) Cheetahs
- (England) David Williams from (England) Nottingham (season-long loan)
- (Argentina) Julián Montoya from (Argentina) Jagaures
- (England) Will Hurd from (Scotland) Glasgow Warriors
- (Scotland) Darryl Marfo from (Wales) Ospreys (short-term deal)
- (England) Nic Dolly from (England) Coventry

=== Players Out ===
- (Wales) Sam Costelow to (Wales) Scarlets
- (England) Jonny May to (England) Gloucester
- (England) Joe Batley returned to (England) Bristol Bears
- (Fiji) Ifereimi Boladau returned to (England) Nottingham
- (England) Sam Eveleigh released
- (Wales) Leo Gilliland released
- (Scotland) Rory Hughes returned to (Scotland) Glasgow Warriors
- (England) Adam Thompstone released
- (England) Jimmy Stevens retired
- (Wales) Jonah Holmes to (Wales) Dragons
- (England) Will Spencer to (England) Bath
- (England) Guy Thompson to (England) Ealing Trailfinders
- (England) Owen Hills to (England) Nottingham
- (Tonga) Telusa Veainu to (France) Stade Français
- (Argentina) Gaston Cortes to (Canada) Toronto Arrows
- (Ireland) Noel Reid to (France) Agen
- (England) Manu Tuilagi to (England) Sale Sharks
- (South Africa) EW Viljoen to (South Africa) Lions
- (Tonga) Sione Kalamafoni to (Wales) Scarlets
- (England) Cameron Jordan to (England) Gloucester
- (Australia) Tatafu Polota-Nau to (Australia) Parramatta Two Blues
- (England) Kyran Bungaroo to (France) Trelissac
- (England) Keston Lines to (England) Coventry
- (England) Andy Forsyth returned to (England) Coventry
- (England) Rory Jennings returned to (England) Coventry
- (England) Greg Bateman to (Wales) Dragons
- (Wales) Joe Thomas to (Wales) Dragons
- (New Zealand) Jordan Taufua to (France) Lyon
- (Australia) Blake Enever released
- (Argentina) Facundo Gigena to (England) London Irish
- (Georgia (country)) Shalva Mamukashvili released
- (England) Jordan Olowofela to (Australia) Western Force (season-long loan)
- (England) George Worth to (Australia) Melbourne Rebels (season-long loan)
- (England) Kyle Eastmond to (England) Leeds Rhinos
- (England) Tom Hardwick released
- (Scotland) Jake Kerr to (England) Bristol Bears
- (England) Luke Wallace to (England) Harlequins

== London Irish ==
=== Players In ===
- (England) Tom Homer from (England) Bath
- (England) Matt Cornish from (England) Ealing Trailfinders
- Charlton Kerr from England Sevens
- (Australia) Rob Simmons from (Australia) NSW Waratahs
- (Argentina) Agustín Creevy from (Argentina) Jaguares
- (England) Phil Cokanasiga promoted from Academy
- (England) Ollie Hassell-Collins promoted from Academy
- (Moldova) Andrei Mahu from (Russia) Krasny Yar
- (Australia) Bill Meakes from (Australia) Melbourne Rebels (short-term deal)
- (Argentina) Facundo Gigena from (England) Leicester Tigers
- (Russia) Vladimir Podrezov from (Russia) VVA Saracens
- (South Africa) Nic Groom from (Scotland) Edinburgh

=== Players Out ===
- (Samoa) Belgium Tuatagaloa to (France) Rouen
- (England) Barney Maddison to (England) Ealing Trailfinders
- (England) Wil Partington to (England) Hartpury University
- (England) Danny Hobbs-Awoyemi to (England) Northampton Saints
- (England) Jack Belcher released
- (South Africa) Pat Cilliers released
- (Australia) Saia Fainga'a released
- (England) Finlay Rossiter released
- (South Africa) Franco van der Merwe released
- (Fiji) Alivereti Veitokani released
- (Australia) Dave Porecki to (Australia) NSW Waratahs
- (England) Stephen Myler to (Wales) Ospreys
- (Scotland) Scott Steele to (England) Harlequins
- (England) Tom Stephenson to (England) Rosslyn Park
- (South Africa) Ruan Botha to (Japan) Kubota Spears
- (England) Ross Neal returned to (United States) Seattle Seawolves
- (England) Tom Fowlie released
- (Ireland) Brendan Macken released
- (Ireland) Conor Gilsenan retired
- (Samoa) TJ Ioane to (Scotland) Glasgow Warriors (loan)
- (United States) Bryce Campbell to (United States) Austin Gilgronis
- (England) Max Northcote-Green to (England) London Royals
- (England) Dan Norton to (England) London Royals
- (South Africa) Sebastian de Chaves to (United States) Austin Gilgronis
- (Australia) Bill Meakes to (United States) LA Giltinis
- (Australia) Sekope Kepu released
- (England) Sam Collingridge to (England) Richmond
- (Australia) Ben Meehan released
- (England) Theo Brophy-Clews retired

== Newcastle Falcons ==
=== Players In ===
- (England) Mark Wilson returned from (England) Sale Sharks
- (Argentina) Matías Orlando from (Argentina) Jaguares
- (Italy) Marco Fuser from (Italy) Benetton
- (England) Pete Lucock from (England) Doncaster Knights
- (Scotland) Tom Marshall promoted from Academy
- (England) Will Montgomery promoted from Academy
- (England) Cameron Nordli-Kelemeti promoted from Academy
- (England) Ben Stevenson promoted from Academy
- (England) George Wacokecoke promoted from Academy
- (England) Tom Penny from (England) Harlequins
- (Samoa) Logovi'i Mulipola returned from (England) Gloucester
- (England) Iwan Stephens from (England) Leeds Rhinos
- (South Africa) Louis Schreuder from (South Africa) Sharks
- (England) Luther Burrell from (England) Warrington Wolves
- (Scotland) Robbie Smith from (England) Bedford Blues
- (Argentina) Mateo Carreras from (Argentina) Jaguares
- (Argentina) Santiago Grondona from (Argentina) Jaguares
- (England) Carl Fearns from (France) Rouen

=== Players Out ===
- (England) Simon Uzokwe to (England) Ealing Trailfinders
- (England) Josh Hodge to (England) Exeter Chiefs
- (England) Johnny Williams to (Wales) Scarlets
- (England) Dominic Waldouck retired
- (South Africa) Tim Swiel to (South Africa) Stormers
- (Samoa) Sinoti Sinoti released
- (Scotland) Jon Welsh released
- (England) Cameron Nordli-Kelemeti to Jersey Reds (season-long loan)
- (England) Toby Salmon to (England) Saracens (season-long loan)
- (England) Darren Barry to (France) Vannes

== Northampton Saints ==
=== Players In ===
- (England) Nick Auterac from (England) Harlequins
- (England) Ollie Sleightholme promoted from Academy
- (New Zealand) Connor Tupai promoted from Academy
- (England) Tom James from (England) Doncaster Knights
- (England) Nick Isiekwe from (England) Saracens (season-long loan)
- (South Africa) Shaun Adendorff from (France) Aurillac
- (England) Danny Hobbs-Awoyemi from (England) London Irish
- (England) Alex Coles promoted from Academy
- (England) Samson Ma'asi promoted from Academy
- (Ireland) Oisín Heffernan from (England) Nottingham
- (England) Alex Seville from (England) Gloucester (short term deal)

=== Players Out ===
- (Scotland) Mitch Eadie to (England) Bristol Bears
- (New Zealand) Ben Franks retired
- (England) Will Davis to (England) Ealing Trailfinders
- (England) James Mitchell to (England) Doncaster Knights
- (Scotland) Gordon Reid released
- (South Africa) Michael van Vuuren to (England) Ealing Trailfinders
- (South Africa) Cobus Reinach to (France) Montpellier
- (England) Ben Glynn returned to (Wales) Ospreys
- (Scotland) Fraser Strachan to (England) Ealing Trailfinders
- (England) Andy Symons to (France) Vannes
- (England) Toby Trinder to (England) Coventry
- (England) Jamie Gibson to (England) Gloucester
- (Scotland) Devante Onojaife to (England) Ampthill

== Sale Sharks ==
=== Players In ===
- (England) Sam Hill from (England) Exeter Chiefs
- (South Africa) Cobus Wiese from (South Africa) Stormers
- (England) Curtis Langdon promoted from Academy
- (England) Matt Postlethwaite promoted from Academy
- (England) Arron Reed promoted from Academy
- (England) Gus Warr promoted from Academy
- (England) Kieron Wilkinson promoted from Academy
- (England) Manu Tuilagi from (England) Leicester Tigers
- (South Africa) JP du Preez from (South Africa) Cheetahs
- (England) Sam Dugdale unattached

=== Players Out ===
- (England) Rob Webber retired
- (England) James Williams to (England) Hartpury University
- (Ireland) Ciaran Booth to (Ireland) Connacht
- (England) Mark Wilson returned to (England) Newcastle Falcons
- (Wales) Joe Jones to (England) Doncaster Knights
- (England) Rouban Birch released
- (England) Sam Dugdale released
- (England) Teddy Leatherbarrow released
- (England) Matt Sturgess to (England) Fylde
- (New Zealand) Bryn Evans to (New Zealand) Hawke's Bay
- (England) Nic Dolly to (England) Coventry

== Wasps ==
=== Players In ===
- (England) Ryan Mills from (England) Worcester Warriors
- (England) Alfie Barbeary promoted from Academy
- (England) Will Simonds promoted from Academy
- (England) Myles Edwards from (France) Oyonnax
- (England) Levi Douglas from (England) Bath
- (Georgia (country)) Lasha Jaiani from (Georgia (country)) Armazi
- (New Zealand) Marlen Walker from (England) Cornish Pirates (short-term loan)
- (Wales) Alex Schwarz from (England) Cornish Pirates (short-term loan)
- (Wales) Nicky Thomas from (Wales) Ospreys (short-term loan)
- (England) Luke Mehson unattached

=== Players Out ===
- (England) Billy Searle to (England) Worcester Warriors
- (England) Charlie Matthews to (Japan) Kamaishi Seawaves
- (South Africa) Nizaam Carr to (South Africa) Bulls
- (South Africa) Ashley Johnson to (England) Birmingham Moseley
- (Ireland) Tom Bacon to (England) Doncaster Knights (season-long loan)
- (France) Thibaud Flament to (France) Toulouse
- (England) Antonio Harris returned to Jersey Reds
- (England) Myles Edwards to (Japan) Toshiba Brave Lupus
- (England) Levi Douglas to (France) Toulon (short-term deal)

== Worcester Warriors ==
=== Players In ===
- (England) Gareth Simpson promoted from Academy
- (England) Billy Searle from (England) Wasps
- (Scotland) Tom Dodd promoted from Academy
- (England) Matt Kvesic from (England) Exeter Chiefs
- (England) Joe Batley from (England) Bristol Bears
- (England) Alex Hearle promoted from Academy
- (England) Nick David promoted from Academy
- (England) James Scott promoted from Academy
- (England) Beck Cutting promoted from Academy
- (England) Kai Owen promoted from Academy
- (England) George Merrick from (France) Clermont
- (Wales) Marc Thomas from (England) Harlequins
- (England) Chris Ashton from (England) Harlequins
- (South Africa) Kyle Hatherell from Jersey Reds
- (South Africa) Maks van Dyk from (England) Exeter Chiefs (short-term loan)
- (Wales) Scott Andrews from (Wales) Cardiff Blues (season-long loan)
- (England) Jay Tyack from (England) Cornish Pirates

=== Players Out ===
- (Wales) Luke Scully to (Wales) Cardiff Blues
- (United States) Joe Taufeteʻe to (France) Lyon
- (England) Ryan Mills to (England) Wasps
- (South Africa) Dean Hammond to (England) Ealing Trailfinders
- (Australia) Jono Lance to (Australia) Western Force
- (England) Luke Baldwin to (Wales) Dragons (season-long loan)
- (England) Ryan Bower to (England) Leicester Tigers
- (Wales) Callum Morris to (England) Stourbridge
- (New Zealand) Michael Fatialofa released
- (Zimbabwe) Farai Mudariki to (France) Nevers
- (South Africa) Scott van Breda to Jersey Reds (short-term loan)
- (England) James Scott to Jersey Reds (season-long loan)

== See also ==
- List of 2020–21 Pro14 transfers
- List of 2020–21 RFU Championship transfers
- List of 2020–21 Super Rugby transfers
- List of 2020–21 Top 14 transfers
- List of 2020–21 Major League Rugby transfers
