= 2020–21 RFU Championship =

Rugby union competition in England

- Countries: England; Jersey
- Date: 6 March 2021 — 20 June 2021
- Champions: Saracens (3rd title)
- Runners-up: Ealing Trailfinders
- Matches played: 56
- Attendance: 4,188 (average 75 per match)
- Highest attendance: 2,000; Saracens vs Ampthill; 17 May 2021
- Tries scored: 430 (average 7.7 per match)
- Top point scorer: (England) Owen Farrell (Saracens); 102 points
- Top try scorer: (South Africa) Rayn Smid (Ealing Trailfinders); 9 tries

The 2020–21 RFU Championship, also known as the 2020–21 Greene King IPA Championship for sponsorship reasons, was the twelfth season of the RFU Championship, the professional second tier of rugby union in England. It featured ten English teams and one from Jersey. The competition was sponsored by Greene King for the eighth successive season. Due to the COVID-19 pandemic in the United Kingdom, this season featured a truncated timeframe of just 16 weeks with a later start and fewer rounds.

== Structure ==
In a change from previous years, the eleven teams played each of the other teams once only, either home or away, to produce a ten-round season. The top two teams played each other in a two-legged play-off, with the winner promoted to the Premiership, if eligible. Due to the cancellation of the National League 1, there was no relegation. The season began on 6 March 2021, and the final round of matches were played in May 2021. Each team received one bye week, and there were three reserve weekends during the season.

== RFU funding change ==
Each club received approximately £375,000 in funding from the RFU in a phased return to the level of funding provided prior to 2016–17 season. Following news of the funding change, several clubs announced their intention to switch to a semi-professional business model.

== Teams ==
Locations of the 2020–21 RFU Championship teams
Greater London RFU Championship teams

Nine of the eleven teams played in last season's competition. Yorkshire Carnegie, later renamed Leeds Tykes, were relegated to National League 1 after finishing bottom of the 2019–20 RFU Championship. They were replaced by Richmond who were promoted from 2019–20 National League 1 after just one year away from the Championship. Newcastle Falcons were promoted back to Premiership Rugby at the first attempt. They were replaced in the RFU Championship by Saracens, who were relegated after finishing bottom of the 2019–20 Premiership Rugby table.

On 2 February 2021, Ampthill announced that due to funding cuts and the costs associated with the COVID-19 pandemic, they might not be able to take part in the season. However, after a large donation, they were able to participate.

London Scottish did not participate due to the costs associated with the pandemic.

Club	Stadium	Capacity	Area	Previous season
Ampthill	Dillingham Park	3,000	Ampthill, Bedfordshire	5th
Bedford Blues	Goldington Road	5,000 (1,700 seats)	Bedford, Bedfordshire	8th
Cornish Pirates	Mennaye Field	4,000 (2,200 seats)	Penzance, Cornwall	3rd
Coventry	Butts Park Arena	4,000 (3,000 seats)	Coventry, West Midlands	4th
Doncaster Knights	Castle Park	5,000 (1,650 seats)	Doncaster, South Yorkshire	10th
Ealing Trailfinders	Trailfinders Sports Ground	4,000 (2,200 seats)	West Ealing, London	2nd
Hartpury University	ALPAS Arena	2,000	Hartpury, Gloucestershire	11th
Jersey Reds	Stade Santander International	4,000	Saint Peter, Jersey	7th
Nottingham	Lady Bay Sports Ground	3,500	Nottingham, Nottinghamshire	6th
Richmond	Athletic Ground	4,500 (1,000 seats)	Richmond, London	Promoted from National League 1
Saracens	StoneX Stadium	8,500	Hendon, Greater London	Relegated from Premiership Rugby

== Pre-season competition ==
Ahead of the season, Ealing, Doncaster and Saracens participated in the Trailfinders Challenge Cup, as a pre-season warm-up. It took place between the 16 January and 20 February as a round-robin tournament where teams played each other home and away.

Ealing Trailfinders won the competition with one game remaining, they received a trophy and £20,000.

=== Table ===
Pos	Team	Pld	W	D	L	PF	PA	PD	TF	TA	TB	LB	Pts
1	Ealing Trailfinders (CH)	4	4	0	0	152	98	+54	21	13	3	0	19
2	Saracens	4	1	0	3	81	76	+5	12	9	2	1	9 (Note: Cancelled Fixture: Doncaster Knights 4pts; Saracens 2pts)
3	Doncaster Knights	4	1	0	3	56	115	−59	7	18	1	0	5

=== Fixtures ===
16 January 2021
15:00

Ealing Trailfinders	27–26	Saracens (1 BP)
	Report

Trailfinders Sports Ground
Attendance: 0
Referee: Jack Makepeace

23 January 2021
15:00

Doncaster Knights	Cancelled; 0–0	Saracens

Castle Park

30 January 2021
15:00

(1 BP) Doncaster Knights	26–46	Ealing Trailfinders (1 BP)
	Report

Castle Park
Attendance: 0
Referee: Hamish Smales

6 February 2021
13:00

(1 BP) Saracens	26–39	Ealing Trailfinders (1 BP)
	Report

StoneX Stadium
Attendance: 0
Referee: Mike Hudson

13 February 2021
16:15

(1 BP) Saracens	29–10	Doncaster Knights
	Report

StoneX Stadium
Referee: Andrew Jackson

20 February 2021
15:00

(1 BP) Ealing Trailfinders	40–20	Doncaster Knights
	Report

Trailfinders Sports Ground

== Table ==
2020–21 RFU Championship table
Pos	Team	Pld	W	D	L	PF	PA	PD	TB	LB	Pts	Qualification
1	Ealing Trailfinders (RU)	10	9	0	1	505	161	+344	9	0	45	Play-off place
2	Saracens (CH)	9	8	0	1	444	101	+343	8	0	40 (Note: Cancelled Fixture: Saracens 0pts; Hartpury University 0pts)	Play-off place
3	Doncaster Knights	10	8	0	2	236	225	+11	4	0	36	
4	Cornish Pirates	10	6	0	4	268	210	+58	5	3	32	
5	Coventry	10	6	0	4	252	282	−30	5	1	30	
6	Jersey Reds	10	5	0	5	256	284	−28	4	0	24	
7	Ampthill	10	4	0	6	217	325	−108	4	2	22	
8	Bedford Blues	10	3	0	7	213	268	−55	2	3	17	
9	Hartpury	9	2	0	7	228	360	−132	3	1	12	
10	Nottingham	10	2	0	8	169	344	−175	2	2	12	
11	Richmond	10	1	0	9	138	366	−228	0	0	4	

Updated to match(es) played on 31 May 2021. Source: "Greene King IPA Championship". England Rugby.
Rules for classification: If teams are level at any stage, tiebreakers are applied in the following order:
1. Number of matches won
2. Difference between points for and against
3. Total number of points for
4. Aggregate number of points scored in matches between tied teams
5. Number of matches won excluding the first match, then the second and so on until the tie is settled
  Notes:

== Fixtures & Results ==
Fixtures for the season were announced by the RFU on 8 February 2021. Jersey Reds played only 3 games at home, having switched with their opponents for their rounds 3 and 5 games based on travel concerns.

=== Round 1 ===
6 March 2021
13:15

(1 BP) Hartpury	38 – 15	Richmond
	Hartpury University

ALPAS Arena
Attendance: 0 (Note: Match played behind closed doors due to local restrictions surrounding the COVID-19 pandemic.)
Referee: Christophe Ridley

6 March 2021
15:00

Cornish Pirates	25 – 17	Saracens
	Pirates

Mennaye Field
Attendance: 0
Referee: Sara Cox

6 March 2021
15:00

Coventry	10 – 9	Bedford Blues (1 BP)
	Coventry

Butts Park Arena
Attendance: 0
Referee: Hamish Smales

7 March 2021
13:00

(1 BP) Ampthill	17 – 19	Doncaster Knights
	Ampthill

Dillingham Park
Attendance: 0
Referee: Simon Harding

7 March 2021
13:00

Nottingham	3 – 52	Ealing Trailfinders (1 BP)
	Trailfinders

Lady Bar Sports Ground
Attendance: 0
Referee: Jack Makepeace

Bye/s: Jersey Reds

=== Round 2 ===
12 March 2021
18:00

Doncaster Knights	20 – 19	Coventry (1 BP)
	Knights

Castle Park
Attendance: 0
Referee: Hamish Smales

12 March 2021
19:45

Bedford Blues	33 – 25	Hartpury
	Blues

Goldington Road
Attendance: 0
Referee: Simon Harding

13 March 2021
13:30

(1 BP) Saracens	45 – 13	Jersey Reds
	Saracens

StoneX Stadium
Attendance: 0
Referee: Jack Makepeace

13 March 2021
14:00

Richmond	7 – 27	Cornish Pirates (1 BP)
	Richmond

Athletic Ground
Attendance: 0
Referee: George Selwood

13 March 2021
15:00

(1 BP) Ealing Trailfinders	54 – 6	Ampthill
	Trailfinders

Trailfinders Sports Ground
Attendance: 0
Referee: Dean Richards

Bye/s: Nottingham

=== Round 3 ===
19 March 2021
18:00

Coventry	19 – 55	Ealing Trailfinders (1 BP)
	Coventry

Butts Park Arena
Attendance: 0

19 March 2021
19:30

Hartpury	21 – 32	Doncaster Knights (1 BP)
	Knights

ALPAS Arena
Attendance: 0

20 March 2021
13:30

Richmond	23 – 15	Jersey Reds
	Richmond

Athletic Ground
Attendance: 0

21 March 2021
12:30

(1 BP) Cornish Pirates	27 – 12	Bedford Blues
	Pirates

Mennaye Field
Attendance: 0

21 March 2021
13:00

(1 BP) Ampthill	31 – 15	Nottingham
	Ampthill

Dillingham Park
Attendance: 0

Bye/s: Saracens

=== Round 4 ===
27 March 2021
13:00

(1 BP) Bedford Blues	20 – 25	Jersey Reds
	Blues

Goldington Road
Attendance: 0

27 March 2021
15:00

Doncaster Knights	17 – 15	Cornish Pirates (1 BP)
	Knights

Castle Park
Attendance: 0

27 March 2021
17:45

Nottingham	24 – 36	Coventry (1 BP)
	Nottingham

Lady Bay Sports Ground
Attendance: 0

28 March 2021
14:15

Richmond	3 – 32	Saracens (1 BP)
	Richmond

Athletic Ground
Attendance: 0

28 March 2021
15:00

(1 BP) Ealing Trailfinders	75 – 19	Hartpury
	Trailfinders

Trailfinders Sports Ground
Attendance: 0

Bye/s: Ampthill

=== Round 5 ===
10 April 2021
13:30

Cornish Pirates	10 – 38	Ealing Trailfinders (1 BP)
	Trailfinders

Mennaye Field
Attendance: 0

10 April 2021
14:30

Doncaster Knights	22 – 10	Jersey Reds
	Knights

Castle Park
Attendance: 0

10 April 2021
16:30

Hartpury	15 – 13	Nottingham (1 BP)
	Hartpury

ALPAS Arena
Attendance: 0

11 April 2021
13:00

(1 BP) Saracens	54 – 13	Bedford Blues
	Saracens

StoneX Stadium
Attendance: 0

11 April 2021
14:30

(1 BP) Coventry	26 – 15	Ampthill
	Coventry

Butts Park Arena
Attendance: 0

Bye/s: Richmond

=== Round 6 ===
17 April 2021
12:30

Nottingham	22 – 33	Cornish Pirates (1 BP)
	Pirates

Lady Bay Sports Ground
Attendance: 0 (Note: Match played behind closed doors due to national restrictions surrounding the COVID-19 pandemic.)

17 April 2021
13:00

(1 BP) Ealing Trailfinders	64 – 17	Jersey Reds
	Trailfinders

Trailfinders Sports Ground
Attendance: 0

17 April 2021
16:15

(1 BP) Bedford Blues	38 – 10	Richmond
	Blues

Goldington Road
Attendance: 0

18 April 2021
13:00

(1 BP) Ampthill	43 – 41	Hartpury (2 BP)
	Ampthill

Dillingham Park
Attendance: 0

18 April 2021
15:00

Doncaster Knights	15 – 50	Saracens (1 BP)
	Knights

Castle Park
Attendance: 0

Bye/s: Coventry

=== Round 7 ===
24 April 2021
13:00

Hartpury	24 – 47	Coventry (1 BP)
	Hartpury

ALPAS Arena
Attendance: 0

24 April 2021
13:30

(1 BP) Cornish Pirates	18 – 20	Ampthill
	Pirates

Mennaye Field
Attendance: 0

24 April 2021
15:00

(1 BP) Jersey Reds	55 – 12	Nottingham
	Reds

Stade Santander International
Attendance: 1,031 (Note: Spectators limited due to island restrictions surrounding the COVID-19 pandemic.)

24 April 2021
15:00

Richmond	12 – 40	Doncaster Knights (1 BP)
	Richmond

Athletic Ground
Attendance: 0

25 April 2021
15:00

(1 BP) Saracens	48 – 20	Ealing Trailfinders
	Trailfinders

StoneX Stadium
Attendance: 0

Bye/s: Bedford Blues

=== Round 8 ===
1 May 2021
13:45

Ampthill	14 – 29	Jersey Reds (1 BP)
	Ampthill

Dillingham Park
Attendance: 0

1 May 2021
15:00

Coventry	19 – 30	Cornish Pirates
	Coventry

Butts Park Arena
Attendance: 0

1 May 2021
15:30

(1 BP) Ealing Trailfinders	69 – 7	Richmond
	Trailfinders

Trailfinders Sports Ground
Attendance: 0

1 May 2021
17:30

Nottingham	0 – 56	Saracens (1 BP)
	Saracens

Lady Bay Sports Ground
Attendance: 0

2 May 2021
13:00

(1 BP) Doncaster Knights	27 – 19	Bedford Blues
	Knights

Castle Park
Attendance: 0

Bye/s: Hartpury

=== Round 9 ===
14 May 2021
19:45

Bedford Blues	17 – 40	Ealing Trailfinders (1 BP)
	Trailfinders

Goldington Road
Attendance: 0

15 May 2021
15:00

Jersey Reds	10 – 34	Coventry (1 BP)
	Reds

Stade Santander International
Attendance: 1,157

15 May 2021
15:00

Richmond	17 – 34	Nottingham (1 BP)
	Richmond

Athletic Ground
Attendance: 0

15 May 2021
15:30

(1 BP) Cornish Pirates	52 – 26	Hartpury (1 BP)
	Pirates

Mennaye Field
Attendance: 0

17 May 2021
19:30

(1 BP) Saracens	69 – 12	Ampthill
	Saracens

StoneX Stadium
Attendance: 2,000 (Note: Capacity limited to 25% due to national restrictions surrounding the COVID-19 pandemic.)

Bye/s: Doncaster Knights

=== Round 10 ===
22 May 2021
13:00

Hartpury	19 – 50	Jersey Reds (1 BP)
	Hartpury

ALPAS Arena
Attendance:

22 May 2021
15:00

(1 BP) Ealing Trailfinders	38 – 15	Doncaster Knights
	Trailfinders

Trailfinders Sports Ground
Attendance:

22 May 2021
17:00

Coventry	0 – 73	Saracens (1 BP)
	Saracens

Butts Park Arena
Attendance:

23 May 2021
13:00

(1 BP) Ampthill	31 – 22	Richmond
	Ampthill

Dillingham Park
Attendance:

23 May 2021
13:00

Nottingham	22 – 20	Bedford Blues (1 BP)
	Nottingham

Lady Bay Sports Ground
Attendance:

Bye/s: Cornish Pirates

=== Round 11 ===
29 May 2021
14:00

Saracens	Cancelled; 0 – 0 (Note: Hartpury University have returned a number of positive COVID-19 tests and are therefore unable to field a side. No team received any match points.)	Hartpury

StoneX Stadium

29 May 2021
14:00

Richmond	22 – 42	Coventry (1 BP)
	Richmond

Athletic Ground
Attendance:

29 May 2021
14:00

(1 BP) Bedford Blues	32 – 28	Ampthill (2 BP)
	Blues

Goldington Road
Attendance:

29 May 2021
15:00

(1 BP) Jersey Reds	32 – 31	Cornish Pirates (2 BP)
	Reds

Stade Santander International
Attendance:

29 May 2021
16:30

(1 BP) Doncaster Knights	29 – 24	Nottingham (1 BP)

Castle Park
Attendance:

Bye/s: Ealing Trailfinders

== Final ==
The top two teams took part in a two-legged final to determine the champion. The top ranked team at the end of the league season chose which leg they play at home. The matches were played on 13 and 20 June 2021. Subject to meeting the minimum criteria, the champion would be promoted to Premiership Rugby. On 22 May, both Ealing Trailfinders and Saracens qualified for the final. The final was confirmed on 3 June, with Ealing Trailfinders playing the first leg at home.

In June 2021, it was confirmed that only Saracens were eligible for promotion, as Ealing Trailfinders did not meet an RFU deadline, despite having a groundshare in place. Trailfinders intended to appeal the decision, as they claim they were not given adequate information from the league.

With an aggregate score of 117–15, Saracens won the final to take their first second-tier title since 1995 and earn promotion to the Premiership.

=== First leg ===
13 June 2021
16:30

Ealing Trailfinders	0 – 60	Saracens
	Report	Try: Itoje 11' c Davies 24' c George 40' c B. Vunipola (2) 43' c, 54' c Penalty try 64'; Tompkins 73' c Maitland 79' m Con: Farrell (6/7) 12', 25', 40+1', 44', 55', 74'; Pen: Farrell (2/3) 5', 33'

Trailfinders Sports Ground
Referee: Wayne Barnes (RFU)

Team details

FB	15	(Ireland) David Johnston
RW	14	(South Africa) Dean Hammond
OC	13	(England) Max Bodilly
IC	12	(Australia) Matt Gordon
LW	11	(England) James Cordy-Redden	(substituted off) 47'
FH	10	(England) Craig Willis
SH	9	(England) Craig Hampson
N8	8	(South Africa) Rayn Smid (c)
OF	7	(England) Simon Uzokwe	(substituted off) 40'
BF	6	(Scotland) Kieran Murphy
RL	5	(England) James Cannon
LL	4	(South Africa) Bobby de Wee
TP	3	(South Africa) Kyle Whyte	(substituted off) 36'
HK	2	(South Africa) Shaun Malton
LP	1	(England) Will Davis	(substituted off) 40'
Substitutions:
HK	16	(South Africa) Michael van Vuuren
PR	17	(England) James Gibbons	(substituted on) 40'
PR	18	(England) Lewis Thiede	(substituted on) 36'
LK	19	(England) Simon Linsell
FL	20	(England) Guy Thompson	(substituted on) 40'	(yellow card) 64' to 74'
SH	21	(England) Jordan Burns
FB	22	(South Africa) Luke Daniels	(substituted on) 47'
FL	23	(United States) Malon Al-Jiboori
Coach:
(England) Ben Ward

FB	15	(England) Alex Goode	(substituted off) 76'
RW	14	(England) Alex Lewington
OC	13	(England) Elliot Daly	(substituted off) 62'
IC	12	(Wales) Nick Tompkins
LW	11	(Scotland) Sean Maitland
FH	10	(England) Owen Farrell (c)	(substituted off) 76'
SH	9	(Wales) Aled Davies
N8	8	(England) Billy Vunipola
OF	7	(England) Jackson Wray
BF	6	(South Africa) Michael Rhodes	(substituted off) 49'
RL	5	(Scotland) Tim Swinson	(substituted off) 66'
LL	4	(England) Maro Itoje
TP	3	(South Africa) Vincent Koch	(substituted off) 60'
HK	2	(England) Jamie George	(substituted off) 62'
LP	1	(England) Mako Vunipola	(substituted off) 57'
Substitutions:
HK	16	(England) Tom Woolstencroft	(substituted on) 62'
PR	17	(England) Ralph Adams-Hale	(substituted on) 57'
PR	18	(England) Alec Clarey	(substituted on) 60'
LK	19	(Scotland) Callum Hunter-Hill	(substituted on) 66'
FL	20	(England) Sean Reffell	(substituted on) 49'
SH	21	(England) Tom Whiteley	(substituted on) 76'
CE	22	(Scotland) Duncan Taylor	(substituted on) 62'
WG	23	(England) Rotimi Segun	(substituted on) 76'
Coach:
(Ireland) Mark McCall

Man of the Match:
(Scotland) Tim Swinson (Saracens)

Assistant referees:
Paul Dix
Jamie Leahy
Television match official:
Stuart Terheege

=== Second leg ===
20 June 2021
15:30

Saracens	57 – 15	Ealing Trailfinders
Try: Mak. Vunipola 35' c Daly 42' c Koch 46' c George 52' c Tompkins 56' m Lewington 64' c Penalty try 72'; Whiteley 77' c Con: Farrell (4/4) 37', 42', 47', 53'; Man. Vunipola (2/3) 66', 78'; Pen: Farrell (1/1) 7'	Report	Try: Penalty try 1'; Burns 80' m Pen: Willis (1/1) 26'

StoneX Stadium
Attendance: 2,000
Referee: Luke Pearce (RFU)

Team details

FB	15	(England) Alex Goode
RW	14	(England) Alex Lewington
OC	13	(England) Elliot Daly		(substituted off) 54'
IC	12	(Wales) Nick Tompkins
LW	11	(Scotland) Sean Maitland
FH	10	(England) Owen Farrell (c)		(substituted off) 54'
SH	9	(Wales) Aled Davies		(substituted off) 58'
N8	8	(England) Billy Vunipola		(substituted off) 62'
OF	7	(England) Jackson Wray	(yellow card) 1' to 11'
BF	6	(South Africa) Michael Rhodes	(red card) 51'
RL	5	(Scotland) Tim Swinson
LL	4	(England) Maro Itoje		(substituted off) 54'
TP	3	(South Africa) Vincent Koch		(substituted off) 54'
HK	2	(England) Jamie George		(substituted off) 54'
LP	1	(England) Mako Vunipola		(substituted off) 54'
Substitutions:
HK	16	(England) Tom Woolstencroft		(substituted on) 54'
PR	17	(England) Ralph Adams-Hale		(substituted on) 54'
PR	18	(England) Alec Clarey		(substituted on) 54'
LK	19	(Scotland) Callum Hunter-Hill		(substituted on) 54'
FL	20	(Scotland) Andy Christie		(substituted on) 62'
SH	21	(England) Tom Whiteley		(substituted on) 58'
FH	22	(England) Manu Vunipola		(substituted on) 54'
CE	23	(Scotland) Duncan Taylor		(substituted on) 54'
Coach:
(Ireland) Mark McCall

FB	15	(Ireland) David Johnston
RW	14	(South Africa) Luke Daniels		(substituted off) 51'
OC	13	(England) Max Bodilly
IC	12	(South Africa) Pat Howard		(substituted off) 62'
LW	11	(Ireland) Angus Kernohan		(substituted off) 58'
FH	10	(England) Craig Willis
SH	9	(England) Craig Hampson
N8	8	(South Africa) Rayn Smid (c)
OF	7	(England) Guy Thompson
BF	6	(United States) Malon Al-Jiboori
RL	5	(England) Harry Casson		(substituted off) 51'
LL	4	(South Africa) Bobby de Wee
TP	3	(England) Elliot Millar-Mills		(substituted off) 54'		(substituted on) 72'
HK	2	(South Africa) Shaun Malton		(substituted off) 54'
LP	1	(South Africa) Kyle Whyte		(substituted off) 54'
Substitutions:
HK	16	(South Africa) Michael van Vuuren		(substituted on) 54'
PR	17	(England) James Gibbons		(substituted on) 54'
PR	18	(England) Lewis Thiede	(yellow card) 72' to end'	(substituted on) 54'
LK	19	(England) Simon Linsell		(substituted on) 51'
FL	20	(England) Simon Uzokwe			(substituted on) 54'	(substituted off) 72'
SH	21	(England) Jordan Burns		(substituted on) 62'
FH	22	(Ireland) Bill Johnston		(substituted on) 58'
FL	23	(England) Harry Dugmore		(substituted on) 51'	(substituted off) 54'
Coach:
(England) Ben Ward

Man of the Match:
(England) Jackson Wray (Saracens)

Assistant referees:
Matthew Carley
Karl Dickson
Television match official:
Claire Hodnett

== Leading scorers ==
Note: Flags to the left of player names indicate national team as has been defined under World Rugby eligibility rules, or primary nationality for players who have not yet earned international senior caps. Players may hold one or more non-WR nationalities.

=== Most points ===
As of 20 June 2021

Rank	Player	Club	Points
1	(England) Owen Farrell	Saracens	102
2	(South Africa) Brendan Cope	Jersey Reds	84
3	(England) Sam Olver	Doncaster Knights	75
4	(England) Tony Fenner	Coventry	68
5	(England) Craig Willis	Ealing Trailfinders	63
6	(England) Will Maisey	Bedford Blues	54
6	(England) Joshua Bragman	Hartpury University	54
8	(England) Louis Grimoldby	Ampthill	47
9	(South Africa) Rayn Smid	Ealing Trailfinders	45
10	(England) Alex Lewington	Saracens	40

=== Most tries ===
As of 20 June 2021

Rank	Player	Club	Tries
1	(South Africa) Rayn Smid	Ealing Trailfinders	9
2	(England) Alex Lewington	Saracens	8
3	(Scotland) Sean Maitland	Saracens	7
3	(England) Jordan Burns	Ealing Trailfinders	7
3	(England) Dan Frost	Cornish Pirates	7
6	(Wales) Nick Tompkins	Saracens	6
6	(England) Max Bodilly	Ealing Trailfinders	6
6	(England) Tom Duncan	Cornish Pirates	6
6	(England) Ben Foley	Hartpury University	6
10	6+ players tied	Various	5
