= Simon Northcote-Green =

English cricketer

Personal information
- Full name: Simon Roger Northcote-Green
- Born: 30 May 1954 (age 72); Worksop, Nottinghamshire, England
- Batting: Right-handed
- Bowling: Right-arm medium

Domestic team information
- Years: Team
- 1974–1979: Oxford University

Career statistics
Competition	First-class
Matches	9
Runs scored	138
Batting average	9.85
100s/50s	–/–
Top score	38*
Catches/stumpings	3/–
- Source: Cricinfo, 11 January 2020

Simon Roger Northcote-Green (born 30 May 1954) is an English former first-class cricketer.

Northcote-Green was born at Worksop in May 1954. He was educated at St Edward's School, Oxford before going up to Keble College, Oxford. While studying at Oxford, he played first-class cricket for Oxford University. He debuted against Leicestershire and made nine appearances from 1974–79. In his nine first-class appearances, he scored 138 runs at an average of 9.85 and a high score of 38 not out. Between spells studying at Oxford, he attended the University of Reading from 1975–78.

Upon completing his studies, Northcote-Green became a schoolteacher, volunteering at the Mwea Rice Scheme, Kenya, with Voluntary Services Overseas 1980 & 1981 and teaching at Marlborough College and in the United States at Phillips Academy. He began teaching at Dulwich College in 1989, and from 2000 until his retirement in 2016, he was the college's deputy master. His son, Max, is a professional rugby union player.
