= Max Northcote-Green =

English rugby union player

- Born: Max Northcote-Green; 2 April 1994 (age 32) Dulwich, England
- Height: 1.84 m (6 ft 0 in)
- Weight: 107 kg (236 lb; 16 st 12 lb)
- School: Millfield School
- University: Sydney University

Rugby union career
- Position: Flanker
Senior career
Years	Team	Apps	(Points)
2014-16	Bath	10	(10)
2014	→ Coventry	5	(5)
2015	→ Rosslyn Park	7	(5)
2016-2020	London Irish	44	(35)
2020–21	London Royals		
2021	Exeter Chiefs		
2021	Ealing Trailfinders		
- Correct as of 30 April 2017
International career
Years	Team	Apps	(Points)
2012	England U18		

Max 'Noggie' Northcote-Green (born 2 April 1994 in Dulwich, England) is an English professional rugby union footballer for Ealing Trailfinders.

He played as a flanker for London Irish, having joined from Bath for the 2016–17 season. He was not named in the squad update of August 2020.

His father, Simon Northcote-Green, was a first-class cricketer.
