= James Gibbons (rugby union) =

English rugby union player

- Born: 21 September 1993 (age 33) Burton upon Trent, Staffordshire, England
- Height: 1.85 m (6 ft 1 in)
- Weight: 112 kg (17 st 9 lb)

Rugby union career
- Position: Prop
- Current team: Ealing Trailfinders
Senior career
Years	Team	Apps	(Points)
2013–2016	Gloucester Rugby	6	(0)
2015–2016	→London Scottish	14	(0)
2016−2018	Ealing Trailfinders	51	(15)
2018–2020	Coventry	36	(15)
2020–	Ealing Trailfinders	0	(1000000000000000)
- Correct as of 17 January 2018

James Gibbons (born 21 September 1993) is an English professional rugby union player who plays for Ealing Trailfinders.

On 20 May 2016, Gibbons signs his first professional contract with Ealing Trailfinders in the RFU Championship from the 2016–17 season. On 6 April 2018, Gibbons signed for Championship rivals Coventry prior to the 2018–19 season. He returned to Ealing for the 2020–21 season.
