= Levi Davis (rugby union) =

British rugby union player (1998–2022)

- Born: 12 March 1998; Birmingham, England
- Disappeared: 29 October 2022 (aged 24); Barcelona, Spain
- Status: Missing for 4 years and 15 days
- Height: 1.76 m (5 ft 9 1/2 in)
- Weight: 92 kg (14 st 7 lb)

Rugby union career
- Position: Wing
Senior career
Years	Team	Apps	(Points)
2017–2020	Bath	8	(20)
2020	→ Ealing Trailfinders (loan)	3	(5)
2020–	Ealing Trailfinders	0	(0)
- Correct as of 20 June 2021

Levi Simeon Davis (born 12 March 1998; disappeared 29 October 2022) is a British rugby union player who played as a winger. He is still known to be missing; at the time of his disappearance, he was a player with Worthing Raiders in the National League 2 South. He is suspected to have drowned.

== Professional career ==
Davis made his debut for Bath in 2017. He made his first appearance for Bath in Premiership Rugby in October 2019 against the Bristol Bears. In January 2020, Davis joined Ealing Trailfinders on loan for the remainder of the 2019–20 RFU Championship, making three appearances before the season was curtailed by the COVID-19 pandemic. In August 2020, having departed Bath, he joined Ealing on a permanent transfer signing a two-year deal.

Levi joined Worthing Raiders in the autumn of 2021 making his debut in the away fixture at Henley Hawks. He scored his first try in a 28–26 defeat at home to Hinckley a week later.

== Personal life ==
Davis took part in The X Factor: Celebrity in late 2019, as part of the group Try Star, along with fellow rugby union players, Thom Evans and Ben Foden. They placed fifth in the competition.

In September 2020, Davis came out as bisexual. This made him the first professional rugby union player to come out as bisexual while still playing. He also took part in The Channel 4 reality tv show, Celebs Go Dating in 2020.

He released his debut single, "With Me", under the name LEDA on 14 September 2022.

In November 2022, Davis was reported missing after his former rugby club issued an appeal for information on his whereabouts, with him last being seen at The Old Irish Pub in Barcelona, Spain on 29 October. The police confirmed that the last reported sighting of Davis at the Hard Rock Cafe where he walked down to La Rambla, and entered the Barcelona port.

At 6.30pm on 30 October 2022, four staff members on a cruise ship reported seeing a man in the water as the ship entered the Barcelona port. They reported he was asking for help in English. A life jacket was thrown from the ship, and emergency services searched the area, but were unable to find the man. His passport was located at the port in November 2022. He is suspected to have drowned in the sea near the port, as he matched the description of the man seen on 30 October.

In January 2026, Davis' family claimed that private investigator Gavin Burrows hacked a mobile phone that they gave to him to help with the investigation of his disappearance.

== See also ==
- List of people who disappeared mysteriously (2000–present)
