= Max Green (rugby union) =

English rugby union player

- Born: Maxwell George Green; 13 February 1996 (age 30) Bradford, England
- Height: 1.78 m (5 ft 10 in)
- Weight: 82 kg (12 st 13 lb)
- School: Woodhouse Grove School; Prince Henry's Grammar School
- University: Leeds Beckett University

Rugby union career
- Position: Scrum-half
- Current team: Oundle town RFC
Senior career
Years	Team	Apps	(Points)
2015–2017	Yorkshire Carnegie	34	(5)
2017–2023	Bath	19	(0)
2020–2021	→ Jersey Reds (loan)		(0)
2021–2022	→ Bristol Bears (loan)		(0)
2023–2024	Harlequins	11	(0)
2024–2025	CA Périgueux	20	(15)
2025–	Harlequins (loan)	0	(0)
- Correct as of 30 July 2025
International career
Years	Team	Apps	(Points)
2013–2014	Sweden U18		
2016	England U20	10	(5)
- Correct as of 30 July 2025

Max Green (born 13 February 1996) is an English professional rugby union player who plays as a scrum-half for English Prem side Harlequins on loan from French Nationale side CA Périgueux.

== Club career ==
Green made his debut for Yorkshire Carnegie during the 2015/16 campaign and became a regular the following season. In November 2017 he signed for Bath. Green played for Bath in the Anglo-Welsh Cup making his club debut against London Irish at the Madejski Stadium in 2017.

In March 2021, he was loaned to RFU Championship side Jersey Reds for the remainder of the 2020–21 season and made seven appearances. (after breaking leg and surgery in Jan 2020 and surgery on wrist in Oct 2019)

In September 2023, following six seasons contracted with Bath permanently, Green signed for Harlequins, initially on a short-term deal. This coincided with the 2023 Rugby World Cup where first choice scrum half Danny Care had been playing with England. In December 2023, Green extended his deal with Harlequins on a permanent basis to the end of the season. He left Harlequins at the end of the season joining Championnat Fédéral Nationale side CA Périgueux in the French third tier.

In July 2025, he re-signed for Harlequins initially on loan ahead of the 2025–26 season.

== International career ==
Green qualifies to represent Sweden through his mother's side and represented Sweden Under-18 in two FIRA tournaments, 2013 and 2014.

Green was a member of the England under-20 team that hosted the 2016 World Rugby Under 20 Championship and scored a try in the semi-final against South Africa. He started in the final as England defeated Ireland to win the tournament.
