= Luc Jones (rugby union) =

- Born: Luc Jones; 12 May 1994 (age 32) Neath, Wales
- Height: 177 cm (5 ft 10 in)
- Weight: 84 kg (13 st 3 lb)
- School: Ysgol Gyfun Ystalyfera

Rugby union career
- Position: scrum half
Senior career
| Years | Team | Apps | (Points) |
| 2013-16 | NG Dragons | 54 | (25) |
| 2016-17 | Harlequins | 14 | (15) |
| 2017-19 | Richmond | 49 | (75) |
| 2019–2020 | Jersey Reds | | |
- Correct as of 26 Jan 2014
International career
| Years | Team | Apps | (Points) |
| 2014 | Wales U20 | 8 | (0) |
- Correct as of 26 Jan 2014

Luc Jones (born 12 May 1994) is a Welsh rugby union player who has played for Jersey Reds in the RFU Championship as a scrum half. Prior to that he played one season for Harlequins, Richmond and three for the Dragons regional team, making 54 appearances. He started his career at Neath RFC. In January 2014 he was named in the Wales under-20 squad for the 2014 Under-20 Six Nations Championship and World Cup.

In 2017, he joined the Richmond F.C.

== Personal ==
His father is former Wales international flanker and Dutch Head Coach Lyn Jones.
