= Pete Laverick =

Peter Laverick
- Born: 18 January 1995 (age 31) Bath, England
- Height: 6 ft (183 cm)
- Weight: 94 kg (207 lb)
- University: University of Exeter

Rugby union career
- Position: Centre
Senior career
Years	Team	Apps	(Points)
2016–2017	Taunton	1	(0)
2017–2018	Cornish Pirates	13	(5)
2018–2020	Exeter Chiefs	1	(0)
2020-21	Valley RFC		
- Correct as of 17 October 2020

Pete Laverick (born 18 January 1995) is a former professional rugby union player from Bath, England.

== Career ==
Laverick joined Exeter Chiefs after studying at Exeter University. In August 2017 he joined the Cornish Pirates on loan. In January 2018 he was named in the Chiefs side to face Worcester Warriors in the Anglo-Welsh Cup. In 2020, he joined Valley RFC in Hong Kong after taking up a position as a trainee banker with Société Générale.

== Personal life ==
Born in Bath, Somerset Laverick was educated at Prior Park College before attending Exeter University with whom Exeter Chiefs have strong links.
