= Craig Hampson =

English rugby union player

- Born: Craig Hampson; 25 October 1990 (age 36) London, England
- Height: 1.78 m (5 ft 10 in)
- Weight: 83 kg (13 st 1 lb)

Rugby union career
- Position: Scrum-half
Senior career
| Years | Team | Apps | (Points) |
| 2010–2014 | Leeds Tykes | 60 | (35) |
| 2014–2016 | Bristol | 31 | (0) |
| 2016–2019 | Wasps | 32 | (5) |
| 2019– | Ealing Trailfinders | 17 | (15) |
- Correct as of 31 December 2017

Craig Hampson (born 25 October 1990) is an English rugby union player who plays for the Ealing Trailfinders in the RFU Championship.

He was impressed during the 2013/14 campaign with Yorkshire Carnegie and subsequently named in their RFU Championship Dream Team XV. He signed for Championship rivals Bristol from the 2014/15 season.

On 6 January 2016, Hampson joined up with Aviva Premiership side Wasps on a loan deal from Bristol in January 2016 after Joe Simpson was ruled out for an extended period. Hampson made his debut for Wasps coming off the bench against Newcastle Falcons at Kingston Park of the Premiership and his impressive performances in matches and training saw him rewarded with a permanent deal. Hampson first full season at Wasps saw him make several more appearances and was instrumental in helping the A League side reach the semi-finals.

On 9 April 2019, Hampson makes his return to the RFU Championship with Ealing Trailfinders from the 2019-20 season.
