= Harry Sloan =

English rugby union player

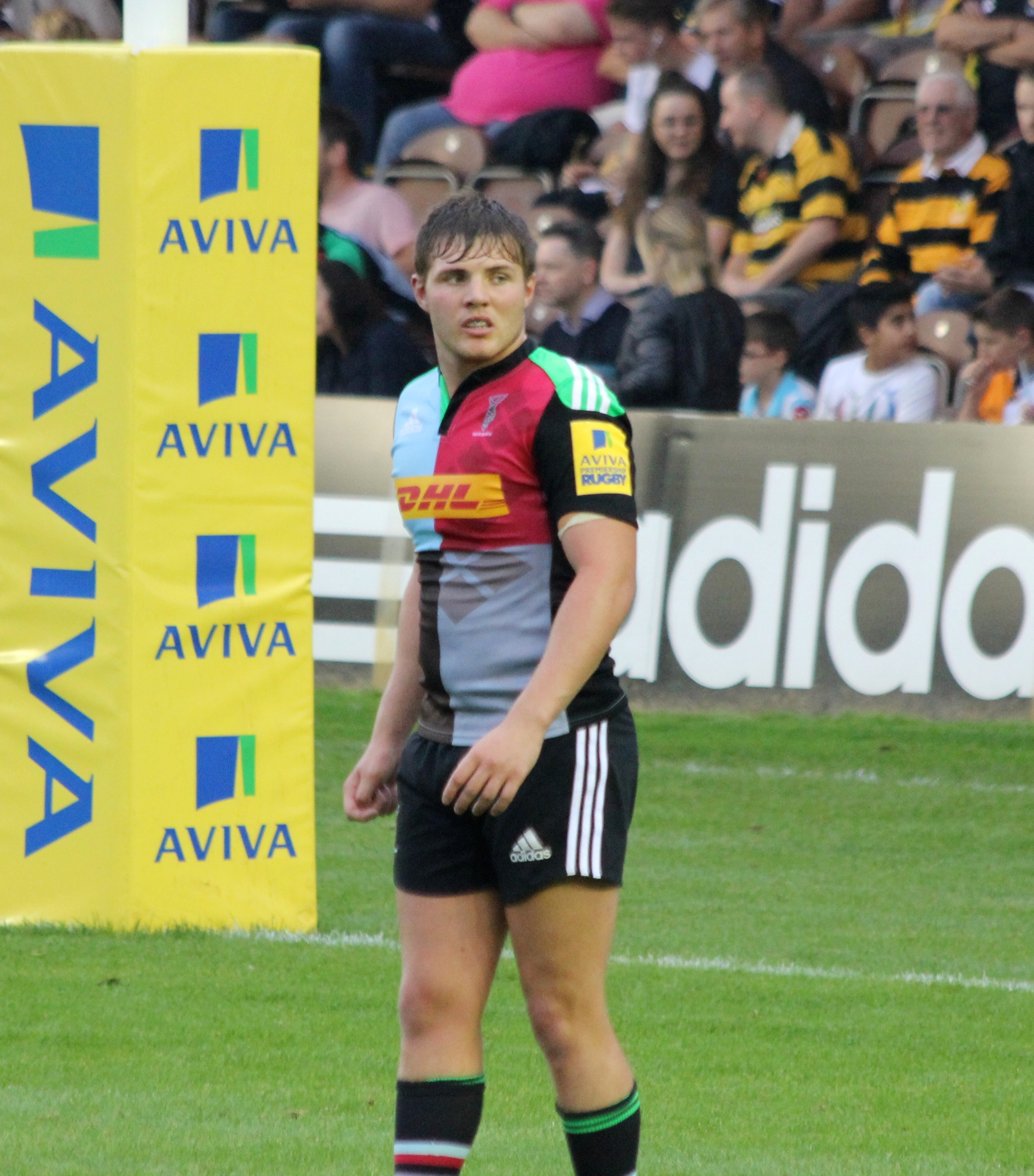
- Born: 16 June 1994 (age 32) Pembury, Kent, England
- Height: 1.85 m (6 ft 1 in)
- Weight: 108 kg (17 st 0 lb; 238 lb)

Rugby union career
- Position: Centre
- Current team: Saracens
Youth career
- Cranbrook RFC
Senior career
Years	Team	Apps	(Points)
2012–2018	Harlequins	37	(25)
2012–2013	→ Worthing (loan)	8	(15)
2013–2014	→ Ealing Trailfinders (loan)	1	(0)
2014–2015	→ London Scottish (loan)	8	(5)
2018–2020	Ealing Trailfinders	29	(40)
2020–2022	Saracens	7	(5)
2022–2024	Agen	50	(30)
International career
Years	Team	Apps	(Points)
2011	England U18	2	(0)
2012–2014	England U20	13	(15)

Harry Sloan (born 16 July 1994) is a professional rugby player for Agen. He plays as a centre and has previously played in the RFU Championship with Ealing Trailfinders and in Premiership Rugby with Harlequins.

He first took up rugby when his father took him to Kent side Cranbrook RFC. Sloan was offered a trial at Harlequins. He impressed and was added to their academy, later on joining the senior side.

While in the Harlequins Academy, Sloan was named in England's U20 squad, winning the 2013 Six Nations Under 20s Championship, before winning two consecutive Junior World Cup titles.

Sloan represented both London Scottish and Ealing Trailfinders as part of his development as a young player at Harlequins. During these spells he was dual registered and still eligible for selection at Harlequins.

Sloan made his Aviva Premiership debut in March 2014 after coming through Quins' academy. He signed a new contract with Harlequins on 11 January 2016 for an undisclosed length.

Sloan left Harlequins to join RFU Championship side Ealing Trailfinders ahead of the 2018–19 season.

He joined Saracens ahead of the 2020–21 season.
