= Will Montgomery (rugby union) =

English rugby union player

- Born: William Robert Montgomery; 2 February 2000 (age 26) Surrey, England
- Height: 1.96 m (6 ft 5 in)
- Weight: 120 kg (18 st 13 lb)

Rugby union career
- Position: Lock
- Current team: Newcastle Falcons
Senior career
Years	Team	Apps	(Points)
2018–	Ealing Trailfinders		
- Correct as of 25 March 2021
- Correct as of 25 March 2021

Will Montgomery (born 2 February 2000) is an English rugby union player who plays for Ealing Trailfinders.

He previously played for Newcastle Falcons.
