= Aled Davies (rugby union) =

Welsh rugby player (born 1992)

- Born: Aled Davies; 19 July 1992 (age 34) Bronwydd, Wales
- Height: 5 ft 10 in (1.78 m)
- Weight: 13 st 5 lb (85 kg)
- School: Ysgol Bro Myrddin, Coleg Sir Gar

Rugby union career
- Position: Scrum-half
- Current team: Cardiff
Amateur team(s)
Years	Team	Apps	(Points)
- Whitland RFC
Senior career
Years	Team	Apps	(Points)
2009–2014	Llanelli RFC	49	(50)
2014–2018	Scarlets	93	(20)
2018–2020	Ospreys	27	(10)
2020–2024	Saracens	64	(25)
2024-	Cardiff	30	(5)
International career
Years	Team	Apps	(Points)
2006–2008	Wales U16		
2009–2011	Wales U18	2	(5)
2017-2019	Wales	20	(5)
- Correct as of 10:32, 22 October 2019 (UTC)

Aled Davies (born 19 July 1992) is a Welsh rugby union player who plays at scrum-half for Cardiff.

== Club career ==
Davies, a scrum half, was born in Carmarthen, and was a member of the age grade set up in the Scarlets region for a number of seasons; playing in the Reebok Regional Championship final with the Scarlets U18 during the 2008–09 season. He then made his debut for the Scarlets in a friendly against Worcester Warriors, coming off the bench in the 43–14 win. His competitive debut came a season later in the Anglo-Welsh Cup, where Davies made a substitute appearance in a 31–3 victory over Leicester Tigers. Davies left the Scarlets at the end of the 2017–18 season, moving to their local rivals, the Ospreys. In May 2020 it was announced he had signed a three-year deal to join English side Saracens from the 2020–21 season.

He helped Saracens win the Premiership title in 2023, featuring as a replacement in the final as Saracens defeated Sale Sharks.

Davies moved to Cardiff ahead of the 2024-25 season.

== International career ==
Davies played for Wales U18 in the 2009 U18 Six Nations Championship, Davies made his under-18 debut against France in a 27–15 victory, scoring a try.

In May 2013 he was selected in the Wales national rugby union team 32 man training squad for the summer 2013 tour to Japan. In January 2016 he was called up to the senior squad again for the 2016 Six Nations Championship. In May 2017 he was named in the Wales senior squad for the tests against Tonga and Samoa in June 2017.

== International tries ==
Try	Opponent	Location	Venue	Competition	Date	Result
1	Tonga	Cardiff, Wales	Millennium Stadium	2018 Autumn Internationals	17 November 2018	Win
