= Jordan Els =

South African rugby union player

- Full name: Jordan Els
- Born: 11 June 1997 (age 29) East London, South Africa
- Height: 1.88 m (6 ft 2 in)
- Weight: 122 kg (269 lb; 19 st 3 lb)

Rugby union career
- Position: Loose-head Prop
- Current team: Northampton Saints
Youth career
- 2015–2017: Sharks
Senior career
Years	Team	Apps	(Points)
2017–2018	Sharks XV	8	(0)
2018–2020	Ealing Trailfinders	24	(0)
2020–2026	Harlequins	58	(15)
2022–2024	→ London Scottish (loan)	13	(5)
2026–	Northampton Saints	2	(0)
- Correct as of 18 October 2026

Jordan Els (born 11 June 1997) is a South African rugby union player who plays for Northampton Saints in the Gallagher Premiership. He previously played for Natal Sharks, Harlequins F.C. and Ealing Trailfinders, as well as featuring on loan for London Scottish.

== Career ==
The East London born prop played in the youth sides of Natal Sharks before joining the senior side in 2018, featuring in the SuperSport Rugby Challenge. Midway through the 2018–2019 season he moved to London to join Ealing Trailfinders in the RFU Championship, where he was widely regarded as the best loose heads in the league.

He signed for Gallagher Premiership side Harlequins in July 2020 making his debut in Round 11 of the competition coming of the bench against Wasps in a 23–32. In May 2024 and then May 2025 he extended his contract with the club. He left at the end of the 2025/26 season.

In August 2026, he signed a short term contract with Northampton Saints. Making his debut for the club in the Premiership Rugby Cup against his former side Harlequins.

== Honours ==
=== Harlequins ===
- Premiership
  - Champions: (1) 2020-21
