= Max Bodilly =

English rugby union player

- Born: 9 September 1994 (age 32) Truro, Cornwall, England
- Height: 181 cm (5 ft 11 in)
- Weight: 86 kg (13 st 8 lb)

Rugby union career
- Position(s): Outside Centre, Full Back
- Current team: London Welsh
Senior career
Years	Team	Apps	(Points)
2013–2014	Redruth	5	(5)
2013–2019	Cornish Pirates	42	(50)
2014-2020	Exeter Chiefs	31	(50)
2025-2025	Ealing Trailfinders	67	(110)
2025-	London Welsh	16	(35)
- Correct as of 23 Jan 2026

Max Bodilly is a rugby union player and coach currently signed for London Welsh as a player and working as Backs Coach for Ealing Trailfinders and Trailfinders Women. His position of choice is full-back or centre but he can also cover wing.

== Early life ==
He was born in Truro on 9 September 1994 and grew up in the town of Newlyn near Penzance.

== Career ==
At 19 he signed a dual contract with Exeter Chiefs and the Cornish Pirates.

He made his Exeter Chiefs debut against Sale Sharks in the Premiership on 16 May 2014 coming off the bench to replace Phil Dolman in the 79th minute.

His first start and first try for Exeter Chiefs in the Champions Cup fixture away to Bordeaux-Begles on 16 January 2016 and his first Premiership start was away to Gloucester Rugby in Premiership Round 1 on 1 September 2017.

He scored 2 tries from full back in the 2018/19 LV Cup Final against Saracens who eventually went on to win the final 23-20.

On 28 May 2020 during COVID it was announced that Max had signed for Ealing Trailfinders in the English Championship.

The 2020–21 season was another season shortened by COVID and had a revised schedule where each team only played the other once with a two legged playoff at the end to decide the Champions. It was also made interesting by the demotion of Saracens and all their International stars into the Championship.

Max sat out the first few games but eventually made his debut starting at home to Hartpury RFC where he scored two tries, the first after 8 minutes. He then started every game for the rest of the regular season scoring 6 tries in 7 games. Ealing topped the table winning nine of the ten games and ending up 5 points clear of second place Saracens. The two legged playoff however was a different kettle of fish with Saracens fielding a strong squad featuring several British & Irish Lions and World Cup Winners winning both games easily.

The 2020–21 season finally saw a return to full time rugby and was a hugely successful for Ealing Trailfinders with the club winning a League and Cup Double.

Max featured heavily in pre season scoring away at Gloucester Rugby and the team started the Championship season strongly with a 54-20 win against Hartpury with Max in the starting No. 13 shirt. After a defeat away to Cornish Pirates Ealing went on a run of 9 wins from 10 games with Max scoring a brace against Ampthill. The season ended with four straight wins that took Ealing to the title finishing off with a 60-10 home win in which Max scored another two tries.

The Championship Cup took place after the Championship season was completed. The club made the decision to use this as more of a development tournament and as a result Max was rested.

On 28 June 2022 Max was announced at the backs coach London Cornish RFC.

The 2022–23 season was a very hard-fought season between Jersey Reds and Ealing Trailfinders with Jersey Reds winning the Championship and Ealing winning the Championship Cup. Again Max had cemented down the No. 13 shirt in the face of stiff competition and played in 23 of Ealing’s 31 games in the season starting 21. During the League run in Max scored 6 tries in 8 games however defeat in Jersey in the penultimate game of the season meant the title went to the Islanders. In that Jersey game, Max won his 50th cap for Ealing Trailfinders.

Revenge however was soon gained when Ealing beat Jersey Reds 35-31 to win the Championship Cup Final with Max scoring one of the tries.

On 18 July 2023 he was announced as Backs Coach at Camberley RFC.

The 2023–24 season season started with a positional change for Max to Full Back. Having played in the first six games of the season he then picked up an injury that kept him on the sidelines for 8 weeks. Then at Cambridge on 24 February he picked up another injury that ended not only his season but the start of the next one. Ealing stormed to the title, their second in three years, however again promotion was not forthcoming.

On 20 June 2024 it was announced that Max had signed a one year extension at Ealing Trailfinders.

The injury carryover combined with the signing of Tobi Wilson at Full Back meant that Max didn't make a first team appearance until 23 November in the 2024/25 season and appearances were rare as Ealing won yet another Championship title, eventually winning the league by 13 points.

In April 2025 Trailfinders announced that Max would be leaving the club as a player at the end of the season.

On 31 May 2025 Max played what was seen as his last game of fully professional rugby in a 12-45 win away to Hartpury RFC at the 4ED Hartpury Stadium. Determined to go out in style in front of friends and family up from Cornwall Max sustained a head wound in the first few minutes of the game, a yellow card and a try before being replaced in the 45th minutes to applause from his teammates.

For the 2025/26 season Max has signed as player coach at London Welsh and will also have a coaching role at with both Ealing Trailfinders and Trailfinders Women.

Stats
Club	Season	Games	Starts	Tries	Pens	Cons	DGs	Points
Cornish Pirates	2013/14	8	8	3	0	0	0	15
Exeter Chiefs	2013/14	1	0	0	0	0	0	0
Cornish Pirates	2014/15	9	9	2	0	0	0	10
Exeter Chiefs	2014/15	2	0	0	0	0	0	0
Cornish Pirates	2015/16	6	2	0	0	0	0	0
Exeter Chiefs	2015/16	9	1	1	0	0	0	5
Cornish Pirates	2016/17	8	6	3	0	0	0	15
Exeter Chiefs	2016/17	3	0	0	0	0	0	0
Exeter Chiefs	2017/18	5	1	0	0	0	0	0
Exeter Chiefs	2018/19	5	3	2	0	0	0	10
Exeter Chiefs	2019/20	6	5	0	0	0	0	0
Ealing Trailfinders	2020/21	7	7	6	0	0	0	30
Ealing Trailfinders	2021/22	19	19	6	0	0	0	30
Ealing Trailfinders	2022/23	23	21	8	0	0	0	40
Ealing Trailfinders	2023/24	13	6	1	0	0	0	5
Ealing Trailfinders	2024/25	5	3	1	0	0	0	5
London Welsh RFC	2025/26	16	16	7	0	0	0	35
TOTALS	-	145	107	40	0	0	0	200
