= Matt Gordon (rugby union) =

Australian rugby union player

- Born: Matt Gordon; 2 November 1994 (age 32) Toowoomba, Queensland, Australia
- Height: 1.83 m (6 ft 0 in)
- Weight: 108 kg (17 st 0 lb)

Rugby union career
- Position: Centre
- Current team: Edinburgh
Senior career
Years	Team	Apps	(Points)
2015–2016	Queensland Country	5	(0)
2018	Brisbane City	7	(20)
2019–2020	London Scottish	14	(20)
2020–2021	Edinburgh	1	(0)
2021	Ealing Trailfinders	6	(20)
- Correct as of 5 April 2022

Matt Gordon (born 2 November 1994) is an Australian rugby union player for Ealing Trailfinders in the RFU Championship. Gordon's primary position is centre.

== Rugby Union career ==
=== Professional career ===
Gordon represented both Queensland Country and Brisbane City before moving to England to join London Scottish. He joined Edinburgh in May 2020 but moved to Ealing Trailfinders in March 2021.
