= Darren Atkins =

English rugby union player

Darren Atkins (born 11 February 1997 (age 28)) is a professional rugby union player for Jersey Reds on loan from Bath. He can play at wing or full back.

He made his first team debut for Bath against Leicester Tigers in the Anglo-Welsh Cup in November 2017. He played for Bath senior team in January 2018 against Newcastle Falcons in the Anglo-Welsh Cup. Bath won 21-8 at the Rec.

In March 2021, he was loaned to RFU Championship side Jersey Reds for the remainder of the 2020–21 season.

== International career ==
A member of the England U20 team who reached the final of the Junior World Cup.
