= Will Britton =

English rugby union player (born 1996)

- Born: Will Britton; 6 September 1996 (age 30) Bath, England
- Height: 1.95 m (6 ft 5 in)
- Weight: 117 kg (18 st 6 lb; 258 lb)
- School: Dauntsey's School
- University: University of Bath

Rugby union career
- Position: Lock
Senior career
| Years | Team | Apps | (Points) |
| 2017–2019 | Bath | 4 | (0) |
| 2017–2018 | → Yorkshire Carnegie | 7 | (0) |
| 2019–2021 | Doncaster Knights | 9 | (0) |
| 2021–2022 | Gloucester | 0 | (0) |
| 2022– | Cornish Pirates | 0 | (0) |
- Correct as of 8 September 2021
International career
| Years | Team | Apps | (Points) |
| 2018 | England Students | | |

Will Britton (born 6 September 1996) is an English rugby union player currently play for Cornish Pirates in the RFU Championship.

After leaving Dauntsey's School, Britton progressed through the Bath academy set up to make his first team debut in January 2018; aiding the Blue, Black & Whites to a 21–8 victory over Newcastle Falcons in the 2017–18 Anglo-Welsh Cup. Will studied for a Sport & Social Sciences degree at the University of Bath while part of the setup at Farleigh House and Captained the University 1st XV for successive BUCS Super Rugby campaigns resulting in an England Students call up in 2018 in the April internationals against Ireland Universities and France Students.

On 6 September 2018, Britton was dual-registered with Yorkshire Carnegie in the RFU Championship for the 2018–19 season, featured regularly for the Tykes and for Bath's Premiership Rugby Cup games at the Recreation Ground . On 7 February 2020, Britton was dual-registered with Championship rivals Doncaster Knights for the remainder of the 2020–21 season. It soon became a permanent deal with Doncaster following his released from Bath from last season.

On 14 July 2021, Britton returns to the Premiership Rugby as he signed for West Country rivals Gloucester from the 2021–22 season.

On 31 May 2022, Britton returns to the RFU Championship as he signs for Cornish Pirates from the 2022–23 season.
