= Kyle Hatherell =

South African rugby union player

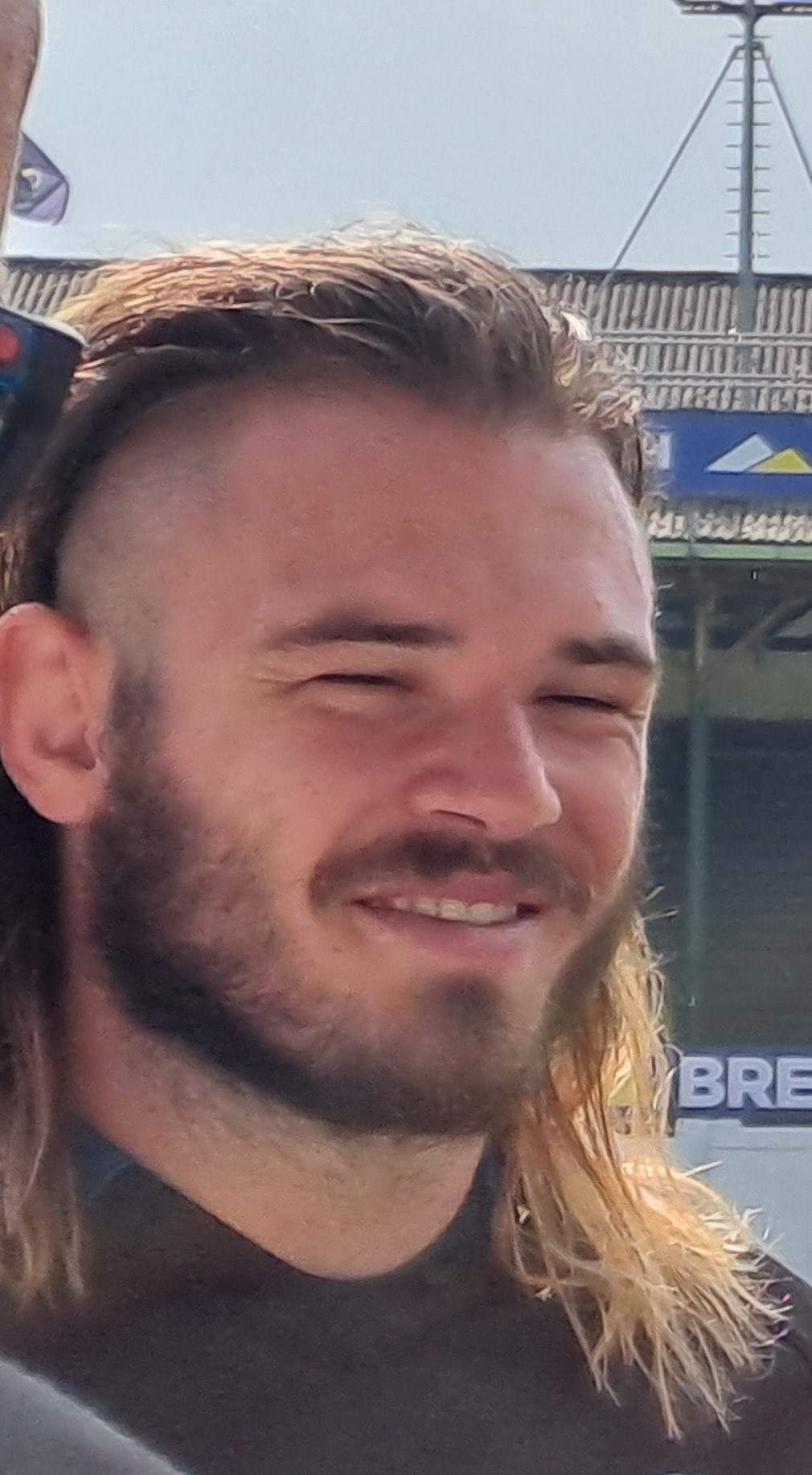
- Hatherell in August 2024
- Born: Kyle Hatherell; 3 April 1995 (age 31) South Africa
- Height: 1.93 m (6 ft 4 in)
- Weight: 114 kg (17 st 13 lb)
- School: Ligbron Akademie vir Tegnologie
- University: Varsity College

Rugby union career
- Position(s): Lock; Back row
Amateur team(s)
Years	Team	Apps	(Points)
- Sharks
2016–2018	Marr		
- Correct as of 16 January 2022
Senior career
Years	Team	Apps	(Points)
2018–2021	Jersey Reds	35	(40)
2021–2022	Worcester Warriors	25	(20)
2022–2023	La Rochelle	16	(10)
2023–2025	Leicester Tigers	30	(15)
2025–	Ealing Trailfinders	0	(0)
- Correct as of 15 June 2025

Kyle Hatherell (born 3 April 1995) is a South African rugby union player. He previously played for Worcester Warriors in Premiership Rugby, Jersey Reds in the RFU Championship, La Rochelle in France's Top 14 and for Leicester Tigers in Premiership Rugby.

== Career ==
Hatherell was born and raised in South Africa but is England qualified. He previously played for Varsity College and Sharks at Under-21s in South Africa. He also played for Marr in Scotland's Premiership competition.

On 3 April 2018, it was confirmed that Hatherell signed for Jersey Reds in the RFU Championship from the 2018–19 season. He made his debut for Jersey against Coventry in September 2018.

On 16 March 2021, Hatherell left Jersey with immediate effect as he signs for Worcester Warriors in the Premiership Rugby. Hatherell made his debut as a replacement in the defeat by Exeter Chiefs at Sandy Park the following month. He scored his first try for Warriors against Gloucester Rugby at Sixways in October 2021.

Following Worcester's entry into administration Hatherell was made redundant, he subsequently joined La Rochelle for the remained of the 2022-23 season.

On 26 January 2023, Leicester Tigers announced Hatherell as a new signing for the 2023-24 season.

On 20 June 2025, Hatherell would sign for Ealing Trailfinders in the RFU Championship from the 2025-26 season.
