= Luke Scully =

Welsh rugby union player

- Born: 28 February 2000 (age 26) Banwen, Neath Port Talbot, Wales
- Height: 1.80 m (5 ft 11 in)
- Weight: 80 kg (13 st; 180 lb)
- School: Neath Port Talbot College

Rugby union career
- Position(s): Fly-half, Centre
- Current team: Ospreys
Youth career
- Worcester Warriors
Senior career
Years	Team	Apps	(Points)
2020–2022	Cardiff Rugby	1	(0)
2021	→Cornish Pirates (Loan)	4	(17)
2022–	Ospreys	1	(0)
2022–	Swansea RFC	3	(11)
- Correct as of 30 November 2022
International career
Years	Team	Apps	(Points)
2020	Wales U20s	3	(0)
- Correct as of 5 November 2022

Luke Scully (born 28 February 2000) is a Welsh rugby union player, currently playing for United Rugby Championship side Ospreys as a fly-half and centre.

== Club career ==
=== Early years and Worcester ===
Scully began his career with the Ospreys academy, before joining Worcester Warriors in 2018.

=== Cardiff and Cornish Pirates ===
Scully signed his first professional contract for Cardiff Blues in February 2020, joining the side from Worcester Warriors at the end of the 2019–20 season.

He made his Cardiff Blues debut in Round 10 of the 2020–21 Pro14 against Ospreys.

He joined Cornish Pirates in 2021 on a loan, but was injured early in his stint and only featured four times for the side.

Scully departed Cardiff at the end of the 2021–2022 season.

=== Ospreys ===
He linked up with the Ospreys during the 2022–2023 preseason, featuring in a friendly against Northampton. Scully made his competitive debut off the bench against the Bulls on 26 November 2022.

While with the Ospreys, Scully has played for feeder club Swansea RFC.

Scully signed an extension with the Ospreys on 10 July 2023. Scully signed further extension on 26 February 2024.

== International career ==
=== Wales U18 and U20 ===
In 2018, Scully was part of the Wales U18 team.

Scully featured for Wales U20 during the 2020 Six Nations Under 20s Championship.
