= Will Davis (rugby union) =

English rugby union player

- Born: Will D. Davis; 16 March 1990 (age 36) Bristol, England
- Height: 1.85 m (6 ft 1 in)
- Weight: 114 kg (17 st 13 lb)

Rugby union career
- Position: Loosehead Prop
- Current team: Ealing Trailfinders
Senior career
Years	Team	Apps	(Points)
2014–2018	Ealing Trailfinders	67	(5)
2018–2020	Northampton Saints	7	(0)
2020–	Ealing Trailfinders		
- Correct as of 9 May 2019

Will D. Davis (born 16 March 1990) is an English professional rugby union player who plays for Ealing Trailfinders as a Prop.
