= Simon Linsell =

English rugby union player

- Born: Simon Linsell; 14 September 1994 (age 32)
- Height: 1.96 m (6 ft 5 in)
- Weight: 114 kg (17 st 13 lb)
- School: Marling School
- University: University of Exeter

Rugby union career
- Position: Lock/Flanker
Amateur team(s)
Years	Team	Apps	(Points)
- Painswick RFC
- Correct as of 18 October 2020
Senior career
Years	Team	Apps	(Points)
2018–2020	Hartpury College	23	(15)
2019–2020	Gloucester	3	(0)
2020–	Ealing Trailfinders	0	(0)
- Correct as of 18 October 2020

Simon Linsell (born 14 September 1994) is an English rugby union player who plays for Ealing Trailfinders in the RFU Championship.

Linsell grew up in the Cotswolds and played for his local club, Painswick RFC, his schoolboy career at Marling School based in Stroud led him to the Gloucester Academy and eventually to Hartpury College. He played a limited number of games for Hartpury during the 2013–14 season, helping them win promotion to National League 1

Linsell graduated in Arabic and Middle Eastern Studies from the University of Exeter and while at Exeter, he also skippered their successful BUCS Super Rugby side, fierce rivals of Hartpury's own university team.

He since returned to Hartpury, where in August 2018, was named club captain ahead of the 2018–19 season in the RFU Championship.

Linsell signed for Gloucester in the Premiership Rugby for the 2019–20 season, whilst still playing on loan for Hartpury. He made three senior appearances for Gloucester in the Premiership Rugby Cup.

On 1 June 2020, Linsell left Gloucester to sign a permanent contract with Championship side Ealing Trailfinders from the 2020–21 season.
