= Jay Tyack =

English rugby union player

- Born: 7 June 1996 (age 30) Truro, Cornwall, England
- Height: 1.86 m (6 ft 1 in)
- Weight: 124 kg (273 lb; 19 st 7 lb)
- School: Penair School

Rugby union career
- Position: Tighthead Prop
Amateur team(s)
Years	Team	Apps	(Points)
- Truro
–	Cornish All Blacks		
–	St Ives		
–	St Austell		
Senior career
Years	Team	Apps	(Points)
2016–2017	Chinnor		
2017–2019	Birmingham Moseley		
2019–2021	Cornish Pirates	31	(0)
2021	→ Gloucester	1	(0)
2021–2022	Worcester Warriors	10	(0)
2022–	Bristol Bears	0	(0)
- Correct as of 23 December 2021

Jay Tyack (born 7 June 1996) is an English rugby union player who plays for Bristol Bears in the Premiership Rugby.

Tyack began his career with Truro following stints with Cornish All Blacks, St Ives and St Austell.

He initially arrived with Cornish Pirates back in 2014 as a Player Development Foundation member, he played England at Under-18 and Schools level and South West U20s, where he was given the chance to play in New Zealand. Then, on his return to England, he gained further experience playing a season at Chinnor in National League 2 South, and then at Birmingham Moseley in National League 1. He subsequently resigned with the Pirates back in the RFU Championship from the 2019–20 season.

On 3 November 2020, Tyack, along with fellow team-mate Kyle Moyle, signed for Gloucester in the Premiership Rugby on short-term loans for the 2020–21 season. His only appearance was from off the bench against French side Lyon in the European Champions Cup in Dedcember 2020. When he returned to the Pirates, Tyack was part of the historic moment defeating Premiership and European champions Saracens 25–17 in the opening of the 2020-21 RFU Championship season.

On 24 May 2021, Tyack signed a two-year deal for local rivals Worcester Warriors ahead of the 2021–22 season. However, due to injuries in the squad, Tyack was arrived at Sixways Stadium before the end of the 2020–21 season. He made his debut from off the bench, against Leicester Tigers back in October 2021. On 5 October 2022 all Worcester players had their contacts terminated due to the liquidation of the company to which they were contracted. On 28 October 2022, Tyack signed for local rivals Bristol Bears for the remainder of the 2022–23 season, following a successful trial period.
