= Luke Wallace =

English rugby union player (born 1990)

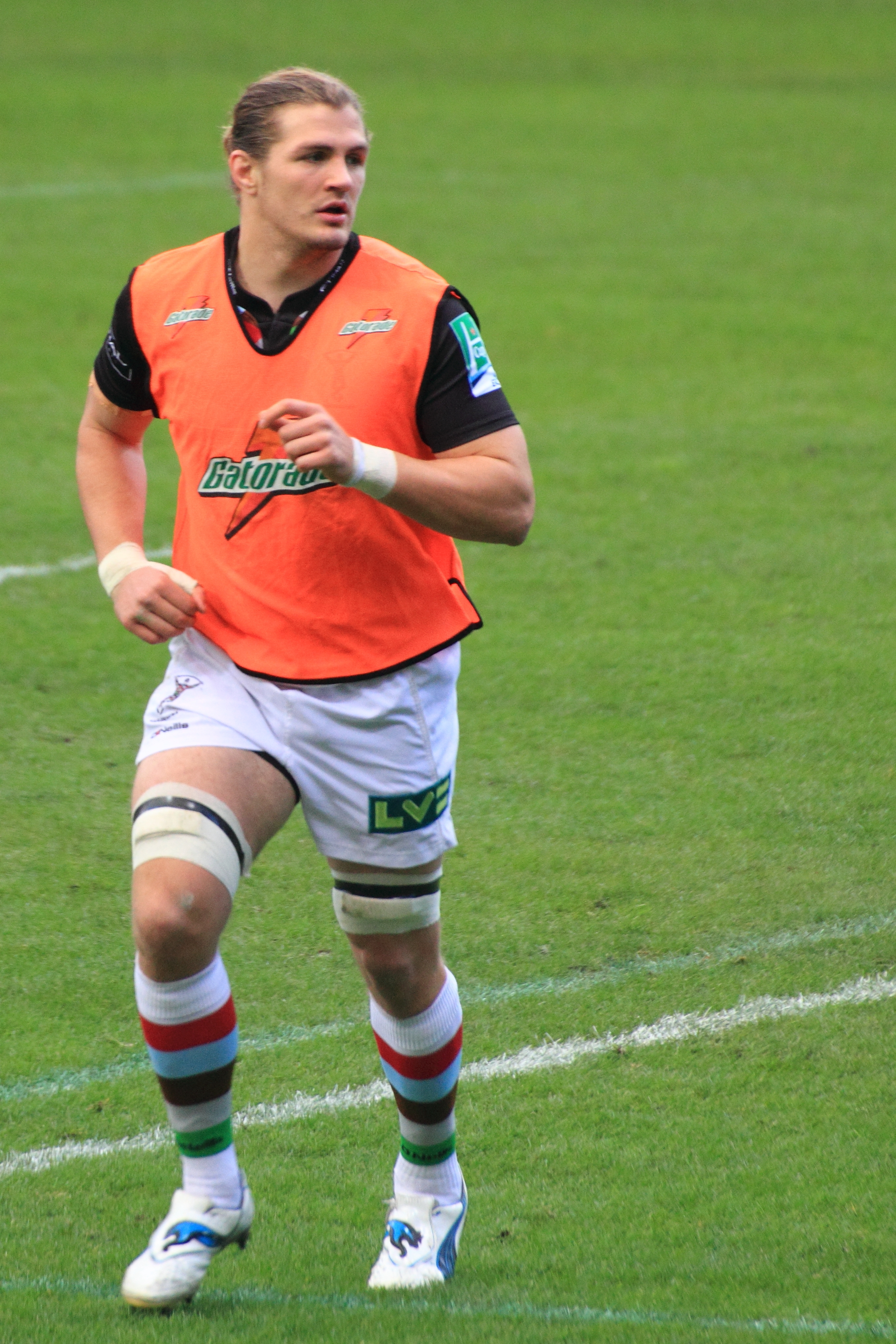
- Born: Luke Wallace; 2 October 1990 (age 36) St Albans, England
- Height: 1.83 m (6 ft 0 in)
- Weight: 102 kg (16 st 1 lb)
- School: Cottesmore School Tonbridge School

Rugby union career
- Position(s): Openside Flanker, Blindside Flanker
- Current team: Harlequins
Youth career
- Harlequins
Senior career
Years	Team	Apps	(Points)
2009-2019	Harlequins	169	(95)
2019	Coventry	15	(5)
2020–2021	Leicester Tigers	16	(5)
2021–2023	Harlequins	26	(5)
- Correct as of 22 May 2025

Luke Wallace (born 2 October 1990 in St Albans, England), is a rugby union player for Harlequins in Premiership Rugby. He is a Flanker, usually playing at open-side.

Luke Wallace, educated at Cottesmore School and Tonbridge School, started playing rugby at school and progressed through Harlequins Elite Player Development Group to the senior Academy. He was selected to play for Quins in the 2009 Middlesex Sevens and in November that year made his first XV debut against Newcastle Falcons in the LV Cup. He continued developing and in January 2011 signed his first senior contract.

2011/12 was a breakthrough season for Wallace, starting with a strong performance in the Premiership Sevens. Luke was dual registered to Esher, but World Cup call ups and two backrow injuries in the opening match of the season saw him starting for the club in rounds 2-7 of the Aviva Premiership. Harlequins were unbeaten during this period and Wallace attracted considerable praise, winning several man of the match awards, the first Etihad player of the month award and later being short listed for the Land Rover Discovery of the Year. Wallace made another 11 first team starts through the season and totalled 24 appearances. He signed for Championship side Coventry in the summer of 2019 after being released by Quins. He signed for Leicester Tigers ahead of the 2020–21 season. He rejoined Harlequins with immediate effect on 27 May 2021.

== International career ==
Wallace was selected for the England squad to face the Barbarians in the summer of 2014.
