= Alec Clarey =

English rugby union player

Alec Carey
- Born: Alec Clarey; 8 February 1994 (age 32) Bishop Auckland, County Durham, England
- Height: 1.80 m (5 ft 11 in)
- Weight: 121 kg (19 st 1 lb)
- School: Bishop Barrington School; Barnard Castle School; Hartpury College

Rugby union career
- Position: Tighthead Prop
Amateur team(s)
Years	Team	Apps	(Points)
2013–2017	Hartpury College	40	(0)
- Correct as of 22 September 2020
Senior career
Years	Team	Apps	(Points)
2016–2017	Bristol	1	(0)
2017–2020	Jersey Reds	28	(0)
2020–	Saracens	6	(0)
- Correct as of 22 September 2020
International career
Years	Team	Apps	(Points)
- England Students
- Correct as of 22 September 2020

Alec Clarey (born 8 February 1994) is an English rugby union player who plays for Saracens in the RFU Championship.

After graduating from Barnard Castle School, he moved to Hartpury College on a scholarship whilst previously represented England Students, where he helped Hartpury win the National League 1 Championship during the 2016–17 season, thus promoted to the RFU Championship next season. He was also a part of Bristol academy system, where he was featured in their Aviva 'A' League competition, whilst playing for Hartpury.

On 27 April 2017, Clarey signed his first professional contract with Jersey Reds to stay in the RFU Championship from the 2017–18 season. On 30 June 2020, Clarey has left Jersey to signed for Saracens from the 2020–21 season.
