= Toby Freeman =

English rugby union player

- Born: 27 October 1987 (age 39) London, England
- Height: 1.96 m (6 ft 5 in)
- Weight: 120 kg (260 lb; 18 st 13 lb)
- University: University of Exeter

Rugby union career
- Position: Lock
- Current team: London Scottish
Youth career
- 2000–2007: Penryn
Senior career
Years	Team	Apps	(Points)
2007–2010	Exeter Chiefs	6	(5)
2010–2012	Ordizia	28	(90)
2012–2013	Rotherham Titans	26	(10)
2013–2017	Nottingham	88	(20)
2017–2019	Cornish Pirates	53	(15)
2019–2020	Harlequins	4	(0)
2020–	London Scottish	0	(0)
- Correct as of 28 September 2020

Toby Freeman (born 27 October 1987) was a professional English rugby union player.

Freeman starting with Penryn based in Cornwall, then played for Exeter Chiefs whilst studying at the University of Exeter, before making the move overseas to play for Spanish side Ordizia, assisting them in winning the 2012 División de Honor de Rugby Cup, whilst also picking up the Man of the Match award in the process.

Freeman returned to the UK to sign for Rotherham Titans in the RFU Championship from the 2012–13 season. From the 2013–14 season, Freeman signed with rivals Nottingham for four seasons making over 80 appearances for the club. He then signed for Cornish Pirates from the 2017–18 season.

On 21 March 2019, Freeman makes his move to the Premiership Rugby for the first time in his career with Harlequins for the 2019–20 season. On 1 June 2020, Freeman returns to the Championship with London Scottish from the 2020–21 season to combine part time rugby with his career transition into becoming a Financial Advisor. He now works for NOVA Wealth, based in London.
