= Pete Lucock =

English rugby union player (born 1992)

- Born: Peter Lucock; 27 November 1992 (age 33) Leeds, England
- Height: 1.83 m (6 ft 0 in)
- Weight: 98 kg (15 st 6 lb)
- School: Allerton Grange School; Prince Henry’s Grammar School

Rugby union career
- Position: Centre
Senior career
Years	Team	Apps	(Points)
2011–2019 & 2023-2025	Leeds Tykes	180	(134)
2019–2020	Doncaster Knights	5	(10)
2020–2023	Newcastle Falcons	39	(10)
- Correct as of 1 August 2021

Pete Lucock (born 27 November 1992) is an English rugby union player who last played for Newcastle Falcons in the Premiership Rugby.

Lucock is a graduate of Leeds Tykes mini-rugby club and he is the only player to have come through the ranks in such a way to play for the first team. He played in the Leeds Tykes minis team until it folded when he joined Moortown RUFC as a junior. He played for Yorkshire RU under 15s, 16s and 18s and for the North at under 16s. Lucock signed for Leeds Carnegie aged 15 and made his first team debut against Rotherham Titans in September 2011 having been promoted to the senior squad ahead of the RFU Championship season. He went on to appear 23 times for the first team (20 in The Championship), helping the team to a play-off finish. In the 2012-13 season he registered his first try in the away fixture against Plymouth Albion but made only 11 appearances in the season due to an injury which sidelined him for four months.

Lucock suffered a season-ending knee injury in November 2013 which limited his appearances that season to 11 games but he impressed sufficiently to secure a two-year contract with Carnegie ahead of the 2014-15 season. During that season, he was one of the stars of the team for Leeds, missing just one game over the campaign (25 appearances almost all at inside centre) and earning the honour of Carnegie Player of the Season. He followed this up with a further 26 appearances during the 2015-16 season, featuring in both of the side’s play off games. He was an almost ever present during the 2016-17 campaign (23 appearances) and played in both play off final legs against London Irish, when the team almost clinched promotion back to the top flight.

During the 2017-18 season, he played a further 22 games, mainly as a makeshift fly-half, became only the sixth player in the club's history to make 100 league appearances for the club, and was voted players' player of the season. He then agreed a new deal for 2018-19 season.

In his final season for Yorkshire Carnegie, 2018–19, he played a further 23 games and was selected as the 12 in the 2018/19 Championship Dream Team XV He finished his career at Headingley having made 164 first team appearances, the most of any back in the history of the club.

On 24 April 2019, Lucock signed for Championship rivals Doncaster Knights from the 2019-20 season. However, Lucock made only limited appearances for Doncaster due to a torn ACL injury in October 2019.

On 8 August 2020, Lucock moved up to the Premiership Rugby with Newcastle Falcons on a three-year deal from the 2020-21 season. He played 39 games for Newcastle over three seasons, 31 in the Premiership, before leaving to take up a player coach role at his former club Leeds Tykes from the 2023/4 season.

He played another 15 games for Leeds Tykes in the 2023/4 season in which they just missed out on promotion despite only losing two games and a further one appearance in the National league 2 North title winning season in 2024/5 when he was head coach. He therefore made 180 appearances for the club in his career.
