= Owen Hills (rugby union) =

English rugby union player (born 1996)

- Born: Owen Hills; 25 August 1996 (age 30) Redditch, England
- Height: 1.83 m (6 ft 0 in)
- Weight: 118.5 kg (18 st 9 lb)

Rugby union career
- Position: Loosehead Prop
Senior career
Years	Team	Apps	(Points)
2016–2017	Moseley	5	(15)
2016–2017	Nottingham	3	(0)
2017–18	Loughborough Students	15	(15)
2017–2020	Leicester Tigers	1	(0)
2020–	Nottingham		
2016–	Total	24	(30)
- Correct as of 12 July 2018

Owen Hills (born 25 August 1996) is an English professional rugby union player, his principal position is prop. He plays for Nottingham in the RFU Championship.

== Career ==
Hills was a Leicester Tigers supporter and season ticket holder before joining the club's academy at the age of 15. In 2015 Hills was named in England Under 20s squad for the 2015 World Rugby Under 20 Championship.

Hills was mentioned by Leicester Tigers head coach Richard Cockerill as young player ready to step up and cover for first team players missing for the 2015 Rugby World Cup. However, Hills was injured in a testimonial for long-serving Leicester player Marcos Ayerza and missed the whole of the 2015–16 season.

He returned from injury in 2016 playing for Moseley and Nottingham on dual-registration. During the 2017–18 season he played for Loughborough Students and made his first team debut for Leicester in an Anglo Welsh Cup match against Bath at the Recreation Ground.

He returned to Nottingham ahead of the 2020–21 season.
