= Dean Hammond (rugby union) =

South African rugby union player

- Born: Dean Hammond; 9 July 1992 (age 34) East London, South Africa
- Height: 1.83 m (6 ft 0 in)
- Weight: 92 kg (203 lb)
- University: Stellenbosch University

Rugby union career
- Position: Wing/Centre
Senior career
Years	Team	Apps	(Points)
2013–2020	Worcester Warriors	50	(95)
2020–	Ealing Trailfinders		
- Correct as of 26 June 2017
Provincial / State sides
Years	Team	Apps	(Points)
2011–2012	Maties		
2012–2013	Western Province		
International career
Years	Team	Apps	(Points)
2012	South Africa U20		
National sevens team
Years	Team		Comps
2011	South Africa Sevens		

Dean Hammond (born 9 July 1992) is a South African rugby union player who plays for English club Ealing Trailfinders in the RFU Championship.

== Club career ==
Hammond represented Maties and Western Province between 2011 and 2013. He later joined Worcester Warriors academy from Western Province in September 2013. He was handed his Warriors debut at the end of that month, coming on as a replacement at Wasps. Hammond scoring his first try for the club in the Amlin Challenge Cup against Biarritz Olympique. Hammond played a significant part in Warriors' British and Irish Cup triumph in the 2014/15 season, scoring in the final against Doncaster Knights, On 29 January 2016, Hammond signed a new professional contract with Worcester at the Sixways Stadium. He continued to progress during the 2015/16 season and scored three tries across six European Challenge Cup games. Hammond scored eight tries in 17 appearances during the 2016/17 campaign, including a hat-trick against Enisei-STM in January 2017. He made his 50th appearance for the club against Wasps.

On 12 June 2020, Hammond departs Worcester to sign for Ealing Trailfinders in the RFU Championship from the 2020–21 season.

== International career ==
He has also played at the South Africa Sevens in 2011 and represented South Africa U20s that won the 2012 IRB Junior World Championship.
