= James Mitchell (rugby union) =

English rugby union player

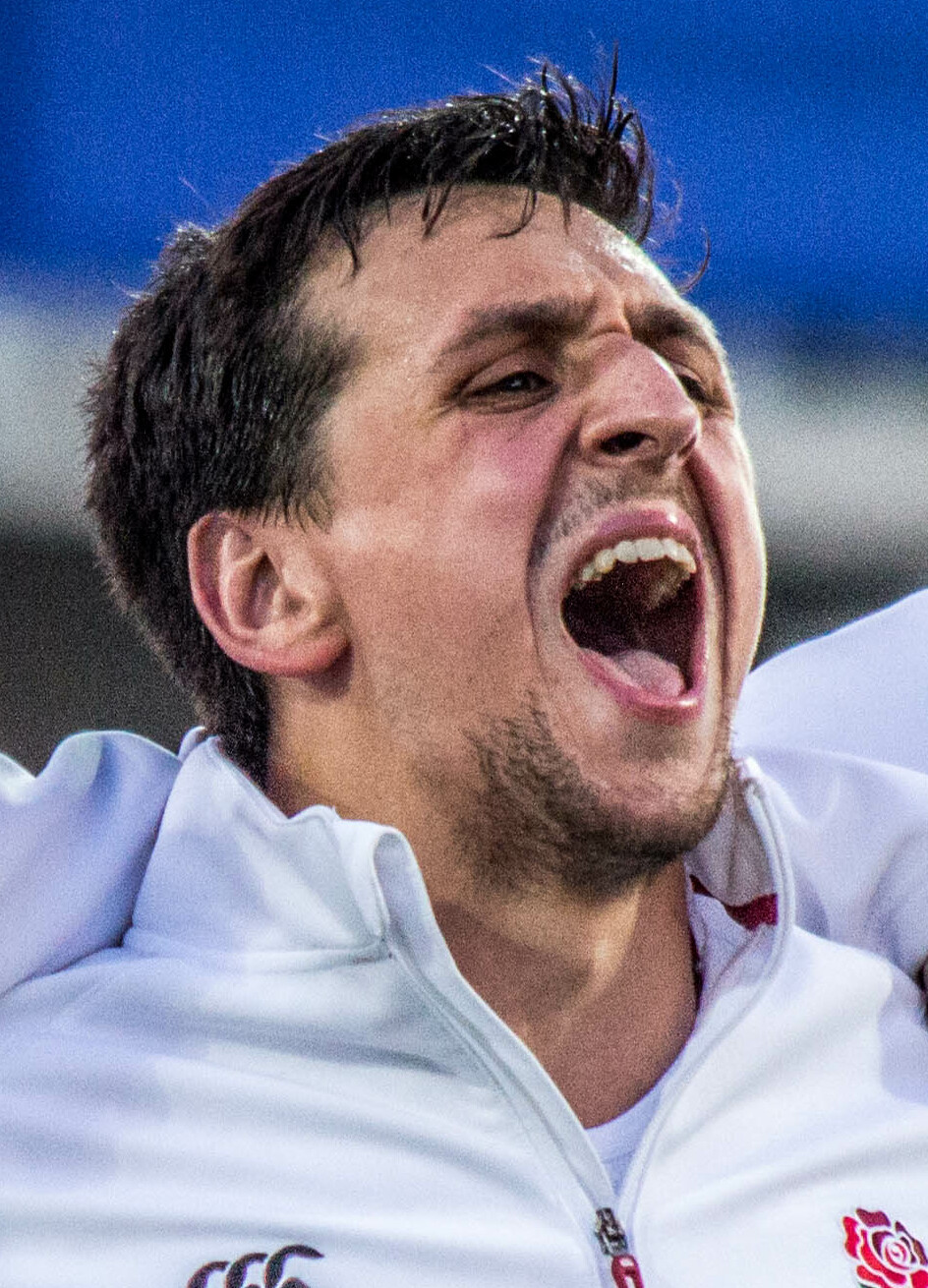
- Born: James Edward Mitchell; 11 February 1995 (age 31) Maidstone, England
- Height: 1.75 m (5 ft 9 in)
- Weight: 83 kg (13 st 1 lb; 183 lb)
- School: Lymm High School
- Notable relative: Alex Mitchell

Rugby union career
- Position: Scrum-half
Senior career
Years	Team	Apps	(Points)
2013–2017	Sale Sharks	25	(13)
2013–2014	→ Chester (loan)	11	(42)
2014–2015	→ Rotherham (loan)	11	(0)
2017–2019	Connacht	26	(10)
2019–2020	Northampton Saints	9	
2020–	Doncaster Knights		
- Correct as of 9 May 2019
International career
Years	Team	Apps	(Points)
–	England U18		
2015	England U20	10	(18)
- Correct as of 13 August 2016

James Mitchell (born 11 February 1995) is an English rugby union player. He primarily plays as a scrum-half. Mitchell plays for RFU Championship side Jersey Reds. Prior to this, he played with Sale Sharks and Northampton Saints in Premiership Rugby and Pro14 side Connacht.

Mitchell made his professional debut for Sale Sharks against Worcester Warriors on 25 January 2014. During his time with the club he had loan spells with Chester and Rotherham Titans.

On 7 June 2017, it was announced that Mitchell, who qualifies to play for Ireland via his grandmother, had signed a two-year contract with Irish province Connacht. He made 26 appearances in two seasons with the side.

Mitchell joined Premiership Rugby side Northampton Saints on a short-term contract ahead of the 2019–20 season.

At conclusion of his contract with Northampton he joined RFU Championship side Doncaster Knights.
