= Ealing Trailfinders Rugby Club =

English rugby union club, based in London

Coordinates: 51.5252°N 0.3300°W

(England) Ealing Trailfinders
- Full name: Ealing Trailfinders Rugby Club
- Union: Middlesex RFU, Surrey RFU
- Founded: 1871; 155 years ago (Note: According to Ealing Traifinders official website, the club played its first match in 1869 but the official date of establishment was set up in 1871.)
- Location: West Ealing, Ealing, London, England
- Ground: Trailfinders Sports Ground (Capacity: 5,000 (2,200 seats))
- President: Dick Craig
- Coach: Ben Ward
- Captain: Angus Kernohan
- League: Champ Rugby
- 2025–26: 1st of 14 (lost play-off semi-final)
| 1st kit | 2nd kit |

Official website
- ealingtrailfinders.com

Ealing Trailfinders Rugby Club is an English professional rugby union club based in West London, playing in Champ Rugby at the 2nd tier of the English rugby union system. The club's first team were the champions in 2024–25 but were considered ineligible for promotion to Premiership Rugby as their home ground's capacity was too small. They were promoted to the league after they won National League 1 in 2014–15.

== Structure of the club ==
The club's registered playing name with the RFU is Ealing Trailfinders. The club is a Mutual Society registered with the FSA, and run on behalf of its members and the game. The club is located in West London at Trailfinders Sports Ground, just south of the A40 at the upper end of West Ealing.

The club has a first team squad, Men's Section, Academy Section, Youth Section, Minis Section and Referees Section. The Ealing Trailfinders first team finished as champions in National League 1 for season 2012–13 and won promotion, for the first time, to the second tier of the English rugby union leagues, the RFU Championship. After one season they finished in twelfth place and were relegated back to National League 1. They were then promoted once more the following season and have remained in the Championship ever since.

The Men's Section runs four teams, competing in The Shield and the Middlesex Merit Leagues, and Middlesex Veterans League. The academy and Youth Sections are for players aged 13 to 23 and the new academy feeds players directly into senior rugby. The youth teams cater for boys and girls at all levels of ability and currently have players representing the county at all age group levels, as well as players just being introduced to the game. The youth play in the Hertfordshire and Middlesex leagues and, in season 2011–12, were league winners at U14 level as well as winning Division Three at U16 level. The club is active at all levels. The mini and youth sections have teams in several age groups with over 750 registered players, making it the biggest club in Middlesex and one of the largest in the country. The club's junior teams are regular winners of County Festivals, and champions of the Herts and Middlesex Leagues for Youth Rugby.

The club has developed a pathway for female players starting at 10 and running through to U18. Known as the Emeralds, this section has provided players to the England Elite Programme. The club has also seen players develop through the new structures to play for England and U.S.

== History ==
=== 1869 – 1995 ===
Founded as Ealing Football Club (RU), the team played its first match in 1869 on Ealing Common, prior to the formation of the Rugby Football Union in 1871. The early years saw regular fixtures against the likes of Wasps, London Irish, Harlequins, Richmond and Blackheath with 75% win rate for a long period.

Leopold de Rothschild was the first president of the club and held this office from 1896 to 1914.

Between 1894 and 1958 the club moved location numerous times – Hanger Lane – West Middlesex Polo Club – Gunnersbury Park – Drayton Green – Syon Lane, Horsenden Hill.

Ealing Rugby Club's centenary match was played against Harlequins in 1970. In the 1970s and ’80s Ealing supplied many county level players for Middlesex. In 1987 the club finished top of London Division 1 and during the next six years was never lower than 2nd in London 1 nor higher than 10th in National 5. Ealing won the Middlesex cup three times in this period.

=== 1995 – present ===
In 1996 Ealing were relegated from London 1. In response, the club formed youth and minis sections, and moved to a new ground at Trailfinders Sports Club in 1999. The club has been awarded two RFU Presidents Awards, the first in 2007 for its work on referee development that has extended into a national programme, and the second in 2008 for coaching excellence. In 2009, the club fielded two first team players who had been developed through the Juniors.

In the 2009–10, season the club was the only team in the National Leagues to score more than 1,000 points, averaging more than 36 in each game. The club narrowly missed out on promotion to National One by losing to Barking RFC by 2 points and Rosslyn Park by 1.

In 2010–11, the club started its Community Rugby programme providing coaching support and access to the game to schools and other groups throughout Ealing and West London. During this season, Ealing's winger Phil Chesters scored 70 tries which is the record for the most tries in an English Rugby season.

2007–08: National Division 3 South, 3rd place Mounts Bay 1st; Cinderford 2nd
2008–09: National Division 3 South, 3rd place London Scottish 1st; Rosslyn Park 2nd
2009–10: National League 2 South, 3rd place Barking 1st; Rosslyn Park 2nd
2010–11: National League 2 South, 1st place Jersey 2nd
2011–12: National League 1, 2nd place Jersey 1st
2012–13: National League 1, 1st place Esher 2nd
2013–14: RFU Championship, 12th
Midway through the season long-serving director of rugby Mike Cudmore announced that he would be stepping down at the season's end. Head coach and fly-half Ben Ward was appointed director of coaching from the start of the 2014–15 season. After fighting against relegation for the majority of the season, Ealing Trailfinders were eventually relegated on the final day of the season by one point after they lost at home to Rotherham Titans, while Jersey won away to Bedford Blues

2014–15: National League 1: 1st
Ealing Trailfinders quickly established themselves in first place in National 1 and they won the title with a haul of 136 points, nine ahead of their nearest rivals Rosslyn Park.

2015–16: RFU Championship: 11th

Ealing had another tough season in life back in the Championship, however were able to beat Birmingham Moseley on the last day of the season, ensuring survival in the second division of English Rugby.

2016–17: RFU Championship : 3rd

Ealing Trailfinders announced the appointment of Alex Codling as Head Coach at Ealing, with Ben Ward being named as director of rugby. The club also signed long time servant of London Scottish and Championship veteran Mark Bright, who became captain on a regular basis as the season progressed. Ealing's season progressed well, winning important games against strong opposition such as Cornish Pirates and Jersey reds and only losing 23–24 to eventual league winners London Irish, where Ealing were winning up until the last minute of the game. Ealing reached the play-offs, eventually finishing 3rd, the highest league position the club has achieved. They faced Yorkshire Carnegie, who in the first leg beat Ealing 34–16. The 2nd leg ended 20–18 to Ealing with a standout end to end try by Luke Peters at the death. However this was not enough, as Carnegie progressed to the final (agg 52–36).

2017–2018: RFU Championship : 2nd

Ealing Trailfinders started the 2017–2018 campaign after having their most successful season in the club's history. At the start of the season, Mark Bright was named Ealing's Club Captain. The team won the final of the British and Irish Cup against Leinster 'A' 22–7, the last winners of the competition. Towards the end of the season Ealing announced over 25 signings, including the likes of Sam Olver, Guy Armitage, Craig Willis, Harry Sloan, Jordy Reid, and the re-signing of Andrew Durutalo (who had left earlier in the season). Ealing also released about 3/4 of their team from this season.

During a Talksport Interview, Ben Ward, Director of Rugby announced that Ealing wanted promotion to the premiership due to the impending danger of ring-fencing.

2020–21: Seeking Premiership Promotion.

Trailfinders finished top of the table during the 2020–21 Championship season and contested a two-legged play-off with Saracens for promotion. In order to be a premiership club, Ealing must increase the capacity of Vallis Way or ground share with a local club. In June 2021, it was confirmed that a ground-share deal at Saracens' Copthall Stadium was in place but the RFU would not permit promotion as a deadline had been missed. Ealing intended to appeal this decision as they claim they had not had sufficient information from the league.

2021–22: Championship winner

Following the final round of fixtures, Trailfinders remained top of the table and were therefore crowned champions on 2 April 2022.

It had previously been announced that they were once again ineligible for promotion due to capacity of Vallis Way. Trailfinders expressed their disappointment to this ruling stating they had a three-year sustainable plan to reach the required capacity. Their appeal against the decision was withdrawn in April 2022.

2022–23: RFU Championship holders

Ealing entered the season as reigning champions, and had finished in the top two in each of the last five years. However, it was announced in February 2023 that Trailfinders were once again ineligible for promotion to the Premiership due to their ground not meeting the criteria. They did not nominate an alternative ground for audit.

Mid-2020s

After the Premiership Rugby Cup began including Champ Rugby teams from 2023–24 onwards, Ealing have made the semi-finals twice (2023–24 and 2024–25), including defeating the then-reigning Rugby Premiership champions Northampton Saints in the quarter-final in 2024–25.

== Ealing 1871 ==
Ealing Trailfinders also has an amateur team called Ealing 1871 formed in 2019. Ealing 1871 entered the English league structure for the first team during the 2019–20 season, experiencing instant success as they finished as champions of Herts/Middlesex 2 in their debut season.

== Honours ==
Ealing Trailfinders

- London Division 1 champions: 1987–88
- Middlesex Senior Cup winners (7): 1989, 1990, 1994, 2004, 2005, 2006, 2007
- London 2 (north-east v north-west) promotion play-off winners: 2002–03
- London Division 2 North champions: 2004–05
- London 1 v South West 1 promotion play-off winners: 2006–07
- National League 2 South champions: 2010–11
- National League 1 champions (2): 2012–13, 2014–15
- British and Irish Cup winners: 2017–18
- RFU Championship Cup winners (3): 2018–19, 2021–22, 2022–23
- Trailfinders Challenge Cup winners: 2021
- RFU Championship winners (3): 2021–22, 2023–24, 2024–25

Ealing 1871 (Amateur)

- Herts/Middlesex 2 champions: 2019–20

== Current standings ==
2026–27 Champ Rugby table
| Pos | Team | Pld | W | D | L | PF | PA | PD | TF | TA | TB | LB | Pts | Qualification |
|---|---|---|---|---|---|---|---|---|---|---|---|---|---|---|
| 1 | Ealing Trailfinders | 8 | 7 | 0 | 1 | 381 | 196 | +185 | 60 | 29 | 6 | 1 | 35 | Play-off semi-finals |
| 2 | Worcester Warriors | 8 | 7 | 0 | 1 | 361 | 169 | +192 | 56 | 25 | 5 | 0 | 33 | Play-off semi-finals |
| 3 | Coventry | 8 | 6 | 0 | 2 | 363 | 247 | +116 | 54 | 38 | 3 | 2 | 29 | Play-off quarter-finals |
| 4 | Chinnor | 8 | 6 | 0 | 2 | 270 | 235 | +35 | 42 | 37 | 2 | 0 | 26 | Play-off quarter-finals |
| 5 | Bedford Blues | 8 | 5 | 0 | 3 | 276 | 232 | +44 | 44 | 42 | 5 | 1 | 26 | Play-off quarter-finals |
| 6 | Cornish Pirates | 8 | 5 | 0 | 3 | 305 | 255 | +50 | 46 | 38 | 4 | 0 | 24 | Play-off quarter-finals |
| 7 | Rotherham Titans | 8 | 5 | 0 | 3 | 235 | 287 | −52 | 36 | 43 | 1 | 1 | 22 | |
| 8 | Ampthill | 8 | 4 | 0 | 4 | 248 | 335 | −87 | 38 | 51 | 0 | 0 | 16 | |
| 9 | Doncaster Knights | 8 | 3 | 0 | 5 | 249 | 272 | −23 | 37 | 40 | 1 | 2 | 15 | |
| 10 | Richmond | 8 | 3 | 0 | 5 | 212 | 260 | −48 | 32 | 41 | 0 | 1 | 13 | |
| 11 | Hartpury | 8 | 2 | 0 | 6 | 181 | 314 | −133 | 26 | 48 | 0 | 1 | 9 | |
| 12 | Nottingham | 8 | 1 | 0 | 7 | 189 | 276 | −87 | 28 | 42 | 0 | 4 | 8 | Relegation play-off |
| 13 | Blackheath | 8 | 1 | 0 | 7 | 215 | 293 | −78 | 30 | 43 | 0 | 3 | 7 | Relegation play-off |
| 14 | Caldy | 8 | 1 | 0 | 7 | 232 | 346 | −114 | 35 | 53 | 0 | 3 | 7 | Relegated |

Updated to match(es) played on 15 November 2026. Source:
Rules for classification: If teams are level at any stage, tiebreakers are applied in the following order:
1. Number of matches won
2. Number of matches drawn
3. Difference between points for and against
4. Total number of points for
5. Aggregate number of points scored in matches between tied teams
6. Number of matches won excluding the first match, then the second and so on until the tie is settled

== Current squad ==
The Ealing Trailfinders senior squad for the 2025–26 season is:

Ealing Trailfinders 2025–26 Champ Rugby squad
| **Props**: (England) Biyi Alo; (South Africa) kabous Bezuidenhout; (England) Elliot Chilvers; (England) George Davis; (England) James Kenny; (Scotland) Adam Nicol; (New Zealand) PJ Sheck; (South Africa) Kyle Whyte; (South Africa) Lefty Zigiriadis; **Hookers**: (Ireland) Scott Buckley; (England) Matt Cornish; (England) Loic Keasey; (England) Cameron Terry; (England) Harry Thompson; (South Africa) Mike Willemse; **Locks**: (England) Josh Caulfield; (England) Danny Cutmore; (England) David Douglas-Bridge; (England) Geordie Irvine; (England) Matas Jurevicius; (England) Sean Lonsdale; (England) George Shaw; (South Africa) Bobby de Wee | **Back row**: (New Zealand) Jamie Carr; (England) Rob Farrar; (South Africa) Kyle Hatherell; (Italy) Darren Low; (England) Gabriel Mann; (England) Will Montgomery; (South Africa) Siya Ningiza; (Ireland) Conor Oliver; (Australia) Jordy Reid; (New Zealand) Harry Taylor; (Scotland) Josh Taylor; **Scrum-halves**: (England) Sam Edwards; (England) Craig Hampson; (Ireland) Michael Stronge; **Fly-halves**: (Wales) Dan Jones; (Scotland) Richie Simpson; (England) George Worboys | **Centres**: (England) Reuben Bird-Tulloch; (Scotland) Geordie Gwynn; (South Africa) Jordan Holgate; (England) Francis Moore; (England) Will Parry; (Ireland) Rory Scannell; **Wings**: (England) Tom Collins; (England) Toby Cousins; (Ireland) Angus Kernohan; (New Zealand) Brodie Robinson; **Fullbacks**: (Ireland) Patrick Campbell; (England) Michael Dykes; (England) Tobi Wilson |
**(c)** denotes the team captain. (vc) denotes vice-captain. **Bold** denotes internationally capped players.^{ST} denotes a short-term signing. Source:
