= 2022–23 Glasgow Warriors season =

Glasgow Warriors 2022–2023
- Ground: Scotstoun Stadium (Capacity: 7,351)
- Coach: (South Africa) Franco Smith
- Captain: (Scotland) Kyle Steyn
- Most caps: (South Africa) JP du Preez (25)
- Top scorer: (Scotland) George Horne (139)
- Most tries: (Scotland) Johnny Matthews (13)
- League: United Rugby Championship
1st kit	2nd kit

The 2022–23 season will see Glasgow Warriors compete in the competitions: the United Rugby Championship and the European Rugby Challenge Cup.

== Season overview ==
After the disappointment of the side last season, the SRU stood down Danny Wilson as head coach of the time at the end of the 2021–22 season. It took time for a new head coach to be found, but Franco Smith, a South African previously in charge of the Italy national team, took over the reins of the club, just before Glasgow Warriors pre-season fixtures were due to be played.

The new coach Franco Smith announced a new captain for Glasgow Warriors, the Scotland international Kyle Steyn. Steyn became the eleventh captain of the club.

With little time to get Smith's ideas over, the Warriors struggled for the first few fixtures, particularly away from home. However the team adjusted to the new regime and started to flourish and the results followed, both in the URC and in the European Challenge Cup.

Assistant coach Peter Horne said of this season, compared to last: "Last year it was a case of ‘that should never have happened and we can’t let it happen again’, so it wasn't that we needed to change our expectations – this is where we believe we should be. It is exciting when you look at the team and some of the guys we are leaving out – we’re in a good spot."

Glasgow went unbeaten at home in the regular season, but having gone down to 14 men in the quarter final, lost 14-5 to Munster.

The side reached its first ever European final in the Challenge Cup, but fell to the French side Toulon 43-19.

== Team ==
=== Coaches ===
- Head coach: (South Africa) Franco Smith
- Assistant coach: (Scotland) Peter Murchie
- Assistant coach: (Scotland) Peter Horne
- Assistant coach: (Ireland) Nigel Carolan
- Scrum Coach: (Scotland) Alasdair Dickinson
- Head Strength and Conditioning Coach: (Ireland) Cillian Reardon
- Senior Athletic Performance Coach: Damien O'Donoghue
- Sport Scientist: Robin Reidy
- Lead Performance Analyst: Greg Woolard
- Asst. Performance Analyst: Eilidh Wright
- Asst. Performance Analyst: Aidan FitzGerald

=== Staff ===
- Managing Director: Alastair Kellock
- Chairman: Charles Shaw
- Advisory Group: Walter Malcolm, Douglas McCrea, Alan Lees, Paul Taylor, Frank Mitchell, Scott Mathieson
- Rugby Operations Manager: John Manson
- Assistant Operations Manager: Martin Malone
- Kit & Equipment Manager: Dougie Mills
- Head groundsman: Colin McKinnon
- Team Doctor: Dr. Jonathan Hanson
- Clinical Manager and Lead Physiotherapist: Andrew Boag
- Senior Team Physiotherapist: Hene Branders
- Senior Team Physiotherapist: Michael Clark
- Junior Physiotherapist: Christina Finlay
- Communications and Marketing Manager: Cameron MacAllister
- Marketing manager: Claire Scott
- Event Manager: Duncan Seller
- Content Producer: Robyn Struthers
- Administrator: Jana Tobin
- Communications Manager: Craig Wright
- Communications Assistant: Molly Mitchell
- Commercial Manager: Jamie Robertson
- Lead Account Manager: Omar Muhyeddeen
- Partnership Account Manager: Catherine Bunch
- Sponsorship Co-Ordinator: Megan Kennedy
- Community Manager: Stuart Lewis
- Business Club Manager: Adam Ashe

=== Squad ===
Hookers (Scotland) Fraser Brown (Scotland) Angus Fraser (Scotland) Gregor Hiddleston (Scotland) Johnny Matthews (Scotland) George Turner Props (Scotland) Simon Berghan (Scotland) Jamie Bhatti (Scotland) Allan Dell (Scotland) Zander Fagerson (Scotland) Oli Kebble (South Africa) Nathan McBeth (Argentina) Enrique Pieretto (Argentina) Lucio Sordoni (Scotland) Murphy Walker Locks (England) Lewis Bean (Scotland) Scott Cummings (South Africa) JP du Preez (Scotland) Richie Gray (Scotland) Alex Samuel (Scotland) Max Williamson	Loose forwards (Scotland) Gregor Brown (Scotland) Rory Darge (Scotland) Jack Dempsey (Scotland) Matt Fagerson (Scotland) Euan Ferrie (Scotland) Thomas Gordon (South Africa) Sintu Manjezi (Scotland) Jack Mann (Scotland) Ally Miller (England) Cameron Neild (Tonga) Sione Vailanu (Scotland) Ryan Wilson Scrum halves (Scotland) Jamie Dobie (Scotland) George Horne (Scotland) Cameron Jones (Scotland) Sean Kennedy (Scotland) Ali Price Fly halves (England) Joel Hodgson (Scotland) Will Hunt (New Zealand) Tom Jordan (Argentina) Domingo Miotti (Scotland) Ross Thompson (Scotland) Duncan Weir	Centres (Scotland) Huw Jones (Scotland) Sam Johnson (Scotland) Stafford McDowall (Scotland) Sione Tuipulotu Back Three (Argentina) Sebastián Cancelliere (Argentina) Facundo Cordero (Tonga) Walter Fifita (New Zealand) Cole Forbes (New Zealand) Josh McKay (Scotland) Rufus McLean (Scotland) Ollie Smith (Scotland) Kyle Steyn (Scotland) Logan Trotter

==== Scottish Rugby Academy Stage 3 players ====
These players are given a professional contract by the Scottish Rugby Academy. Although given placements they are not contracted by Glasgow Warriors. Players graduate from the academy when a professional club contract is offered.

These players are assigned to Glasgow Warriors for the season 2022–23.

Academy players promoted in the course of the season are listed with the main squad.

- (Scotland) Jamie Drummond – Hooker
- (Scotland) Tom Banatvala – Prop
- (Scotland) Callum Norrie – Prop
- (Scotland) Harris McLeod – Lock
- (Scotland) Rhys Tait – Flanker
- (Scotland) Archie Smeaton – No. 8
- (Scotland) Ben Afshar – Scrum half
- (Scotland) Finlay Burgess – Scrum half
- (Scotland) Christian Townsend – Fly-half
- (Scotland) Ben Salmon – Centre
- (Scotland) Duncan Munn – Centre
- (Scotland) Logan Jarvie – Wing
- (Scotland) Ross McKnight – Wing
- (Scotland) Andy Stirrat – full back

==== Back up players ====
Other players used by Glasgow Warriors over the course of the season. Harry Murray and Euan Cunningham were named in the original academy line up by Glasgow Warriors in their June 2022 depth chart, but left out of the SRU academy announcement in July 2022 and are instead named here.

- (Scotland) Luca Alessandri (Boroughmuir Bears) – Prop
- (Scotland) Mark Ashdown (Glasgow Academicals) – Prop
- (Scotland) Murray McCallum (Edinburgh Rugby) – Prop
- (Scotland) Harry Murray (Ayrshire Bulls) – Lock
- (United States) Cory Daniel (Old Glory DC) – Flanker
- (Scotland) Aminio Bogridrau (Glasgow Hutchesons Aloysians) – Fly half
- (Scotland) Euan Cunningham (Stirling Wolves) – Fly half
- (United States) Owen Sheehy (Old Glory DC) – Fly half
- (Scotland) Callum Ferrie (Glasgow Hawks) – Centre
- (England) Eli Caven (Ayrshire Bulls) – Wing
- (Scotland) Amena Caqusau (Glasgow Hutchesons Aloysians) – Wing
- (United States) John Rizzo (Old Glory DC) – full back

== Player statistics ==
During the 2022–23 season, Glasgow have used 49 different players in competitive games. The table below shows the number of appearances and points scored by each player.

Position	Nation	Name	United Rugby Championship			European Challenge Cup			Total	
Position	Nation	Name	Apps (sub)	Tries	Points kicked	Apps (sub)	Tries	Points kicked	Apps (sub)	Total Pts
HK	(Scotland)	Fraser Brown	11(6)	9	0	1	0	0	12(6)	45
HK	(Scotland)	Angus Fraser	(1)	0	0	(2)	0	0	(3)	0
HK	(Scotland)	Johnny Matthews	6(6)	6	0	3(4)	7	0	9(10)	65
HK	(Scotland)	George Turner	2(6)	0	0	4(2)	2	0	6(8)	10
PR	(Scotland)	Simon Berghan	2(10)	0	0	1(7)	0	0	3(17)	0
PR	(Scotland)	Jamie Bhatti	11(5)	0	0	6	0	0	17(5)	0
PR	(Scotland)	Allan Dell	2(2)	0	0	1	0	0	3(2)	0
PR	(Scotland)	Zander Fagerson	8(2)	2	0	3	1	0	11(2)	15
PR	(Scotland)	Oli Kebble	3(5)	1	0	0	0	0	3(5)	5
PR	(South Africa)	Nathan McBeth	3(7)	0	0	1(7)	0	0	4(14)	0
PR	(Argentina)	Lucio Sordoni	7(4)	0	0	3(1)	0	0	10(5)	0
PR	(Scotland)	Murphy Walker	2(2)	0	0	1	0	0	3(2)	0
LK	(England)	Lewis Bean	7(7)	0	0	2(6)	1	0	9(13)	5
LK	(Scotland)	Scott Cummings	10(2)	1	0	4	0	0	14(2)	5
LK	(South Africa)	JP du Preez	5(13)	1	0	4(3)	0	0	9(16)	5
LK	(Scotland)	Richie Gray	10(1)	0	0	5(2)	1	0	15(3)	5
LK	(Scotland)	Alex Samuel	2(3)	0	0	1(1)	0	0	3(4)	0
BR	(Scotland)	Gregor Brown	4(3)	0	0	0	0	0	4(3)	0
BR	(Scotland)	Rory Darge	6(2)	0	0	3(1)	1	0	9(3)	5
BR	(Scotland)	Jack Dempsey	11	2	0	6	1	0	17	15
BR	(Scotland)	Matt Fagerson	10(1)	3	0	4(1)	1	0	14(2)	20
BR	(Scotland)	Euan Ferrie	(5)	0	0	2(2)	0	0	2(7)	0
BR	(Scotland)	Thomas Gordon	5(5)	6	0	(3)	0	0	5(8)	30
BR	(South Africa)	Sintu Manjezi	7(3)	1	0	(1)	0	0	7(4)	5
BR	(Scotland)	Jack Mann	0	0	0	1	0	0	1	0
BR	(Scotland)	Ally Miller	1	0	0	0	0	0	1	0
BR	(England)	Cameron Neild	(3)	0	0	2	0	0	2(3)	0
BR	(Tonga)	Sione Vailanu	13(2)	5	0	5	1	0	18(2)	30
BR	(Scotland)	Ryan Wilson	4(2)	0	0	1(2)	0	0	5(4)	0
SH	(Scotland)	Jamie Dobie	5(5)	0	0	3(1)	1	0	8(6)	5
SH	(Scotland)	George Horne	9(4)	3	73	5(1)	2	41	14(5)	139
SH	(Scotland)	Sean Kennedy	(3)	0	0	(2)	0	0	(5)	0
SH	(Scotland)	Ali Price	7(7)	1	0	1(4)	0	0	8(11)	5
FH	(New Zealand)	Tom Jordan	16(3)	3	25	2(3)	1	4	18(6)	49
FH	(Argentina)	Domingo Miotti	2(7)	2	26	5	0	8	7(7)	44
FH	(Scotland)	Ross Thompson	(2)	0	0	0	0	0	(2)	0
FH	(Scotland)	Duncan Weir	1(4)	1	14	1(4)	0	15	2(8)	34
CE	(Scotland)	Huw Jones	3(1)	2	0	6	3	0	9(1)	25
CE	(Scotland)	Sam Johnson	10	0	0	1	1	0	11	5
CE	(Scotland)	Stafford McDowall	15	6	0	3(1)	3	0	18(1)	45
CE	(Scotland)	Sione Tuipulotu	10	0	0	6	0	0	16	0
WG	(Argentina)	Sebastián Cancelliere	12	7	0	4	3	0	16	50
WG	(England)	Eli Caven	1	1	0	0	0	0	1	5
WG	(Tonga)	Walter Fifita	0	0	0	(1)	0	0	(1)	0
WG	(New Zealand)	Cole Forbes	12	4	0	2	1	0	14	25
WG	(Scotland)	Rufus McLean	3	1	0	2	1	0	5	10
WG	(Scotland)	Kyle Steyn	10	3	0	6	4	0	16	35
FB	(New Zealand)	Josh McKay	9	2	0	3	1	0	12	15
FB	(Scotland)	Ollie Smith	8	0	0	6	1	0	14	5

== Staff movements ==
=== Coaches ===
==== Personnel in ====
- (South Africa) Franco Smith from Italy

==== Personnel out ====
- (England) Danny Wilson released

== Player movements ==
=== Academy promotions ===
- (Scotland) Gregor Brown from Scottish Rugby Academy
- (Scotland) Angus Fraser from Scottish Rugby Academy
- (Scotland) Alex Samuel from Scottish Rugby Academy
- (Scotland) Max Williamson from Scottish Rugby Academy
- (Scotland) Euan Ferrie from Scottish Rugby Academy

=== Player transfers ===
==== In ====
- (South Africa) JP du Preez from (England) Sale Sharks
- (Tonga) Sione Vailanu from (England) Worcester Warriors
- (Scotland) Huw Jones from (England) Harlequins
- (South Africa) Sintu Manjezi from (South Africa) Bulls
- (Scotland) Allan Dell from (England) London Irish
- (England) Joel Hodgson from (England) Newcastle Falcons
- (Argentina) Lucio Sordoni from (France) Mont-de-Marsan
- (Scotland) Logan Trotter from (Scotland) Stirling Wolves
- (Scotland) Cameron Jones from (Scotland) Ayrshire Bulls
- (Scotland) Will Hunt from (Scotland) Ayrshire Bulls
- (Scotland) Gregor Hiddleston from (Scotland) Stirling Wolves
- (England) Cameron Neild from (England) Worcester Warriors
- (Scotland) Jack Mann from (Scotland) Heriots
- (Scotland) Max Williamson from (England) London Scottish (loan ends)
- (Scotland) Jamie Drummond from (England) London Scottish (loan ends)
- (Argentina) Facundo Cordero from (England) Exeter Chiefs

==== Out ====
- (Scotland) Kiran McDonald to (England) Wasps
- (Scotland) Hamish Bain to Jersey Reds
- (Scotland) Robbie Fergusson released
- (Scotland) Rob Harley to (France) US Carcassonne
- (Scotland) Tom Lambert to (Australia) Waratahs
- (Scotland) Ewan McQuillin released
- (Scotland) Grant Stewart to (Ireland) Connacht
- (Australia) Ratu Tagive released
- (Scotland) Robbie McCallum to (England) London Scottish
- (England) Joel Hodgson to (United States) Utah Warriors
- (Scotland) Logan Trotter to (England) London Irish
- (Scotland) Max Williamson to (England) London Scottish (loan)
- (Scotland) Jamie Drummond to (England) London Scottish (loan)
- (Scotland) Rufus McLean released
- (Tonga) Walter Fifita released
- (Scotland) Will Hunt to (England) Preston Grasshoppers
- (Scotland) Cameron Jones to (Scotland) Edinburgh

== Competitions ==
=== Pre-season and friendlies ===
It was announced that the Warriors would play 2 pre-season matches in September. The first, against Worcester Warriors, would take place in the Inverness Caledonian Thistle stadium as part of the celebration of the centenary of Highland RFC. The last time the Warriors played at the Inverness ground was on 25 March 2000 when they played Edinburgh Rugby there.

Unfortunately Worcester Warriors were in financial trouble; and facing administration they pulled out of the tie. Reigning Super 6 champions Ayrshire Bulls were then named as the replacement side.

Although named in the Warriors replacements, both Will Hunt and Ben Afshar came on for Ayrshire Bulls.

The next match due on 9 September 2022 against Ulster was also cancelled, due to the death of Queen Elizabeth the previous day.

Both Glasgow Warriors and Edinburgh Rugby were invited to play sides in the Super Six Sprint Series against the Super 6 sides. Both released 'A' sides for the competition, featuring a number of international players in their squads.

==== Match 1 - Warriors Cup ====
2 September 2022
7.30pm

Glasgow Warriors (Scotland)	cancelled	(England) Worcester Warriors

Caledonian Stadium

Glasgow Warriors:
Worcester Warriors:

==== Match 2 ====
2 September 2022
7.30pm

Glasgow Warriors (Scotland)	22 - 17	(Scotland) Ayrshire Bulls
Try: Jonny Matthews; George Horne; Fraser Brown; Jack Dempsey; Con: Domingo Miotti	Preview; Report; Report; Report	Try: Jamie Drummond; Will Hunt; Con: Will Hunt x 2 Pen: Richie Simpson

Caledonian Stadium
Attendance: 3,078
Referee: Hollie Davidson (SRU)

Glasgow Warriors: Nathan McBeth, Johnny Matthews, Simon Berghan, Lewis Bean, Richie Gray, Sintu Manjezi, Thomas Gordon, Sione Vailanu, George Horne, Domingo Miotti, Kyle Steyn, Tom Jordan, Stafford McDowall, Walter Fifita, Cole Forbes
Replacements: Fraser Brown, Murphy Walker, Lucio Sordoni, Alex Samuel, Euan Ferrie, JP du Preez, Ryan Wilson, Jack Dempsey, Cameron Jones, Ben Afshar, Joel Hodgson, Will Hunt, Andy Stirrat, Ross McKnight, Sebastián Cancelliere
Ayrshire Bulls: Liam McNamara; J Shedden, R Beattie, A Stirrat, T Glendinning; R Simpson, J Lenac; A Nimmo, J Malcolm, M Scott, E Bloodworth, A Samuel, R Jackson, Lewis McNamara, B Macpherson (captain)
Replacements: W Farquhar, A Rogers, A McGuire, J Drummond, C Henderson, E Hamilton-Bulger, T Brown, G Wilson, F Climo, C Elliot, A Tait, E Caven.

==== Match 3 ====
9 September 2022
7.30pm

Glasgow Warriors (Scotland)	cancelled	(Ireland) Ulster
	Preview; Preview

Scotstoun Stadium

Glasgow Warriors: 1. Nathan McBeth, 2. Johnny Matthews, 3. Murphy Walker, 4. Lewis Bean, 5. Richie Gray, 6. Sintu Manjezi, 7. Thomas Gordon, 8. Jack Dempsey, 9. George Horne, 10. Domingo Miotti, 11. Walter Fifita, 12. Tom Jordan, 13. Stafford McDowall, 14. Kyle Steyn (C), 15. Cole Forbes
Replacements: Fraser Brown, Jamie Bhatti, Lucio Sordoni, JP du Preez, Ryan Wilson, Sione Vailanu, Euan Ferrie, Cam Jones, Duncan Weir, Sam Johnson, Ross McKnight, Sebastian Cancelliere.
Ulster: 1. Eric O’Sullivan, 2. Tom Stewart, 3. Jeff Toomaga-Allen, 4. Sam Carter 5. Cormac Izuchukwu, 6. Matty Rea, 7. Sean Reffell, 8. David McCann (Captain), 9. Nathan Doak, 10. Jake Flannery, 11. Jacob Stockdale, 12. Angus Curtis, 13. Stewart Moore, 14. Rob Baloucoune, 15. Rory Telfer
Replacements: Callum Reid, John Andrew, Declan Moore, Gareth Milasinovich, Frank Bradshaw-Ryan, Harry Sheridan, Jordi Murphy, Lorcan McLoughlin, Dave Shanahan, Michael McDonald, Ian Madigan, Rob Lyttle, Craig Gilroy, Shea O’Brien.

==== Match 4 ====
7 April 2023
7.35pm

(1BP) Ayrshire Bulls (Scotland)	29 - 12	(Scotland) Glasgow Warriors 'A'
Try: Eli Caven; Jamie Shedden x 2 Grant Stewart; Con: Richie Simpson x 3 Pen: Richie Simpson	Preview; Report	Try: Angus Fraser; Ben Salmon; Con: Duncan Weir

Millbrae
Referee: Ruairidh Campbell (SRU)

Ayrshire Bulls: William Farquhar, Grant Stewart, Calvin Henderson, Ed Bloodworth, Rory Jackson, Ryan Sweeney, Blair Jardine, Blair Macpherson (Captain), Reiss Cullen, Richie Simpson, Luca Bardelli, Robert Beattie, Jamie Shedden, Thomas Glendinning, Eli Caven
Replacements: Lewis McNamara, Andrew Nimmo, Craig Miller, Kerr Yule, Tim Brown, Antony Fitch, Grant Baird, Chris Elliot
Glasgow Warriors 'A': Oli Kebble, Angus Fraser, Murphy Walker, Max Williamson, Alex Samuel, Ally Miller, Archie Smeaton, Gregor Brown, Sean Kennedy, Duncan Weir, Ross McKnight, Duncan Munn, Ben Salmon, Logan Jarvie, Christian Townsend
Replacements: Jamie Drummond, Murray McCallum, Euan Ferrie, Harris McLeod, Ben Afshar, Aminio Bogidrau, Callum Ferrie

==== Match 5 ====
15 April 2023
5pm

Boroughmuir Bears (Scotland)	12 - 54	(Scotland) Glasgow Warriors 'A'
Try: Mason Cullen; Craig Keddie; Con: Tom Quinlan	Preview; Report; Report	Try: Angus Fraser x 2 Ally Miller; Euan Ferrie; Penalty try Gregor Brown; Ben Ashfar; Ross McKnight; Con: Duncan Weir x 4 Christian Townsend x 2

Meggetland Sports Complex
Referee: Ian Kenny (SRU)

Boroughmuir Bears: Iain Carmichael, Corey Tait, Martin McGinley, Jack Fisher, Josh King, Craig Keddie (Captain), Scott McGinley, Trystan Andrews, Ruaridh Swan, Tom Quinlan, Joe Jenkins, Scott Robeson, Kerr Johnston, Mason Cullen, Callum Ramm
Replacements: Jerry Blyth-Lafferty, Brandon Sweet, Marcus Goodwin, Arthur Allen, Kieran Westlake, Brodie Young, Adam Scott, Alex Thom
Glasgow Warriors 'A': Jamie Drummond, Angus Fraser, Murphy Walker, Max Williamson, Alex Samuel, Ally Miller, Euan Ferrie, Gregor Brown, Sean Kennedy, Duncan Weir, Logan Jarvie, Duncan Munn, Ben Salmon, Amena Casqusau, Christian Townsend
Replacements: Gregor Hiddleson, Lucio Sordoni, Harris McLeod, Archie Smeaton, Ben Afshar, Aminio Bogidrau, Ross McKnight

==== Match 6 ====
21 April 2023
7.35pm

(1BP) Stirling Wolves (Scotland)	34 - 31	(Scotland) Glasgow Warriors 'A' (1BP)
Try: Marcus Holden x 2 Korie Winters; Reyner Kennedy; Craig Jackson; Con: Marcus Holden x 3 Pen: Marcus Holden	Preview; Report	Try: Thomas Gordon; Gregor Hiddleston; Angus Fraser x2 Ross McKnight; Con: Christian Townsend x 3

Bridgehaugh Park
Referee: David Sutherland (SRU)

Stirling Wolves: Liliam Quarm, Reyner Kennedy (captain), Marius Tamosaitis, Hamish Ferguson, Ruaridh Hart, Jake Spurway, Connor Gordon, Benedict Grant, Kyle McGhie, Craig Jackson, Korie Winters, Marcus Holden, Ryan Southern, Stevie Hamilton, Glenn Bryce
Replacements: Sam Rainey, Adam Woods, George Breese, James Pow, Shaun MacDonald, Eric Davey, Craig Jardine, Fin Callaghan
Glasgow Warriors 'A': Jamie Drummond, Gregor Hiddleston, Murphy Walker, Max Williamson, Alex Samuel, Thomas Gordon, Gregor Brown, Ally Miller (captain), Finlay Burgess, Christian Townsend, Ross McKnight, Andy Stirrat, Ben Salmon, Logan Jarvie, Facundo Cordero
Replacements: Angus Fraser, Mark Ashdown, Luca Alessandri, Harris McLeod, Archie Smeaton, Euan Ferrie, Sean Kennedy, Amino Bogridrau [Ashdown and Alessandri not used]

=== United Rugby Championship ===
The dates and times for the new season were announced on 5 August 2022.

Glasgow Warriors went into their first competitive match of the season against Benetton Treviso in Italy, having only played one pre-season game. It showed, as the Italian side ran out comfortably with a 33-11 bonus point victory. New Head Coach Franco Smith stated: "Execution under pressure is one thing we definitely need to work on going forward. I also learnt a lot about the emotional intelligence of all of the players out there – you could see how each individual handled pressure, how they converted it into positive energy and so on." The team played the next week against Cardiff Rugby, sparking into life and scoring 8 tries. Matt Fagerson said: "We wanted to go out there and show the shifts we’ve made in our game, and while we know we’re by no means the finished article just yet, we did exactly that." That raised expectations for the away match against Ospreys but the Welsh side ran out 32–17 winners. Peter Murchie said: "The final scoreline was poor. There’s no getting away from that. The tale of the game is going to revolve around the mistakes we made, and we have to get better. There’s no two ways about it."

A run against South African sides was next. The home match against last season's URC finalists Bulls saw Glasgow once again click into gear with a bonus point win. Frano Smith commented: "We worked hard all pre-season knowing that we would have to match the South African teams physically, and that was important to what we managed to achieve tonight."

A pattern was beginning to develop with another away loss to the Sharks. Nigel Carolan reflected: "We had a plan to move them around, and we only really managed to click into that plan at about the 38 or 39 minute mark. We kicked too much across the board, and we knew that there was going to be an onslaught coming when the Sharks emptied the bench."

The next match, away to Lions was postponed, so the Warriors went back to a home match against Benetton. The home win run continued. Debutant Alex Samuel noted: "It was a bit stop-start, but we showed tonight that we can play the Glasgow way. Our backs were firing really well tonight, I thought they were outstanding throughout. Up front, too, we were dominant all game – our scrum towards the end, in particular, was so impressive. We got after them at the lineout really well, too, and it was brilliant to see it all gel together so well."

A tough away fixture to Leinster was next, and again the away curse could not be broken. The Warriors enjoyed the majority in territory and possession in the match, but Leinster were clinical with their chances. Franco Smith said: "We almost beat ourselves today. Some of the errors and penalties we gave away were unacceptable – we gave away six consecutive penalties at one point in the first half, which gave them field position that led to their three tries. We were also nowhere near clinical enough when we breached their defence, which we did on a number of occasions. There was always a little error that prevented us getting the score."

The next fixture to Zebre provided the Warriors an opportunity to break the 'away curse' and finally the Warriors came good. Sintu Manjezi said: "It’s good to get the monkey off our back, for sure. It’s a really good win from the boys – we had to work hard for that. The forwards came with a great amount of energy today and the backs finished it off, so it was a great team effort from us. In wet conditions, it was always going to be a forwards-dominated game. I thought we fronted up well today and showed what we can do as a group, especially in that second half. I also have to give credit to the backs as they really steered us around the park well today. We’re buzzing, really. Everyone is incredibly pleased to get that first away win of the season."

Next up was the 1872 Cup fixtures against Edinburgh. The Warriors dominated at Scotstoun in a 16 - 10 victory. JP Du Preez said: "Our set piece dominance really stood out for me. When I just came on and we had a scrum right underneath the poles and we got a penalty, that was a highlight." Proving that the away win against Zebre wasn't a fluke, the Warriors lifted the 1872 Cup with a win at Murrayfield. Sione Tuipulotu praised the Warrior Nation for their Murrayfield numbers: "It means so much to us when fans come down and get behind us and it gives us the biggest lift in the game. Especially when its late on in the games and we are getting a roll on and they are getting behind us."

The Warriors welcomed defending champions Stormers to Scotstoun in what proved to be a cracking match. The Warriors played with an intensity throughout and there was a fine finish from Sebastián Cancelliere from Tuipulotu's smart kick through to secure the match with a bonus point win. Franco Smith said: "It was fantastic to see that we have the confidence now to take on the best teams in the competition in these areas. The guys stepped up to the plate again tonight. Our physicality and the way we went about our business. To take them on at the scrum at the end is a rewarding feeling."

The away match against the Dragons was a potential banana-skin. In a bonus point victory the Warriors ran in 6 tries, but there were times that the Dragons countered themselves, so there was work still to do in defence. Fraser Brown admitted: "It was a mixed bag, to be honest. When we controlled the ball and got into the Dragons’ 22, we came away with points – but there was too many times in the game we lost our way and let them back in."

The match against Ulster at Scotstoun was played in wet miserable conditions. The match proved to be low scoring, but the Warriors out-muscled the Irish team in a 17 - 11 win. The re-arranged away match against the Lions was next, coming in the Six Nations window. The Warriors squad did not match the Lions at altitude and they lost 35 - 24, despite scoring 4 tries. Franco Smith concluded: "We made a lot of mistakes and were pretty self-destructive today, really. There were five clear try-scoring opportunities we created that we didn't convert. We turned the ball over too easily in our own third of the field, and I feel like we lost a little bit of focus during the second quarter of the match."

A home match against Zebre saw the Warriors click back into form, with 8 tries and 50 points scored. That set up an away fixture against Munster at Thomond Park; a team just below the Warriors in the league. A difficult match was expected but the Warriors secured a bonus point before half time with Munster yet to score. Munster did manage to score points in the second half but the damage was already done and the Warriors took 5 pts from the fixture. That secured the play-offs for the Warriors. Domingo Miotti commented: "It’s an amazing feeling and I’m so proud to be a part of this team. That first half was so good for us – our attack, our defence, everything came together and clicked for us. We started the second half with a little bit of indiscipline and that’s something we will work on ahead of next week, but to get the win in that style is such a big moment for this group of players." Smith said of the win: " We know how proud Munster is, and of this ground, so it is a special feeling."

A wet, miserable night in pouring rain was the setting for the home Scarlets match. The Warriors just needed a win to secure a home URC quarter-final. Adding spice to the match, this would be the forerunner for the European Challenge Cup semi-final tie against the Scarlets at Llanelli. The Scarlets seemed to master the conditions in the first half a bit better and with two penalties secured a 6–0 lead. It wasn't until 35 minutes that the Warriors kicked into gear, with Sione Vailanu crashing through the Scarlets defence after a Warriors line-out. The second half was more like it from the Warriors; and Fraser Brown scored a try from a driving maul. Scarlets only reply was another penalty, although they had a try chalked off for offside, with the TMO bailing out the referee. Man of the match Zander Fagerson said: "We’re really happy. It was a big effort from the whole pack. Our pack love to scrum and we knew tonight would be a big battle against a good Scarlets pack. We got the job done, but we know we need to back it up in a couple of weeks when we play them again at the Parc y Scarlets. I think we’re getting better every week. We left a few points out there and could have scored more. We could have been more ruthless. We want to get better and it’s an exciting time to be part of this squad."

As the last match of the regular URC season, results elsewhere meant that the Warriors couldn't improve on their fourth place; and Connacht couldn't reach fifth place, but still had a chance of sixth place. Probably more importantly to the sides: Warriors were looking to go the whole season without losing at home; and Connacht were looking for their seventh win in a row, something that they had never managed before. Warriors burst out of the blocks with a try in a minute, but Connacht scored a few minutes later with a penalty try. Tom Jordan with a juggling act scored another for Glasgow, and then Pendergast scored for Connacht. Then Ali Price scored after a fine move by McDowall, by finishing down the wing. Glasgow nearly score again before the first half ends, but the ball is dropped by Johnson. The second half was much more physical, both sides scoring a try each. It was the boot of George Horne with a penalty that was the difference between the sides at the end. Another home win for the Warriors, then, but the match was costly for its injuries: Matt Fagerson was playing as a back at the end of the match. Franco Smith said of this: "Winning was the most important thing for us tonight against a motivated team from Connacht. We work with a plan. I know that in play-offs there are usually injuries and we must be prepared for that. I believe we have been preparing for the finals from the first day. We’ve had a plan. The players understand the plan and I think we did well. Matt Fagerson in the centres did well. We prepare always for the worst case. All our loose forwards are well prepared and have a good idea of what we want to do with it."

The quarter-final with Munster proved a gruelling battle. It started with the first 20 minutes all Glasgow. They turned down opportunities to kick for points instead preferring to go for tries. Munster defended manfully and then with their first foray into the Glasgow 22 scored a try against the run of play. Then came the moment that was a game-changer. Tom Jordan was red carded for a high tackle on Connor Murray. Buoyed by this, Munster scored another try. Then however their scoring stopped. The second half saw Glasgow with 14 men going for the points, and you would have been hard pressed to say which side had 14 men. Again as at the start of the match, Munster defended manfully, although it came at a cost with several of their players picking up injuries. Glasgow could only manage one try, through Kyle Steyn, and the match petered out with a 14–5 win to the Irish side. Scott Cummings said: "We felt there were still opportunities for us despite the fact we were down to 14 men. We just knew we couldn’t give up, and that we were going to fight until the very last minute of the match. We left everything out there and I’m proud of the shift that the boys put in, but it’s a tough one to take right now in the immediate aftermath of that match."

Franco Smith was philosophical about the result: "In all honesty, to play in two finals for where we are in year one with these boys would have been a huge task. We were all in to win this, there was no talk of taking our foot off the pedal. But now we’ve got to be smart about it. We probably won’t train until later in the week. There will be four or five days when we just reset the bodies and get the minds liberated a little bit. The sense in the changing room is that there is so much determination to finish this season on a high. We’ll make a proper plan for Toulon and with fresh and recovered bodies we’ll go and see if we can bring something back."

==== League table ====
2022–23 United Rugby Championship
	Team	P	W	D	L	PF	PA	PD	TF	TA	Try bonus	Losing bonus	Pts
1	(Ireland) Leinster	18	16	1	1	580	363	+217	82	42	13	0	79
2	(Ireland) Ulster	18	13	0	5	554	378	+176	79	45	12	4	68
3	(South Africa) Stormers (RU)	18	12	2	4	531	391	+140	69	48	13	3	68
4	(Scotland) Glasgow Warriors	18	13	0	5	498	403	+95	72	53	11	0	63
5	(Ireland) Munster (CH)	18	10	1	7	470	357	+113	61	43	9	4	55
6	(South Africa) Bulls	18	10	0	8	613	448	+165	78	52	11	2	53
7	(Ireland) Connacht	18	10	0	8	456	426	+30	64	58	7	3	50
8	(South Africa) Sharks	18	9	1	8	486	480	+6	63	61	8	2	48
9	(South Africa) Lions	18	9	0	9	454	538	–84	55	75	7	2	45
10	(Wales) Cardiff	18	9	0	9	425	470	–45	52	64	6	2	44
11	(Italy) Benetton	18	8	0	10	440	533	–93	56	74	8	1	41
12	(Scotland) Edinburgh	18	6	0	12	466	467	–1	70	62	8	6	38
13	(Wales) Ospreys	18	5	2	11	400	514	–114	52	70	6	5	35
14	(Wales) Scarlets	18	6	1	11	435	506	–71	55	65	5	3	34
15	(Wales) Dragons	18	4	0	14	391	534	–143	46	70	5	3	24
16	(Italy) Zebre Parma	18	0	0	18	343	734	–391	50	105	6	5	11
If teams are level at any stage, tiebreakers are applied in the following order: 1. number of matches won; 2. the difference between points for and points against; 3. the number of tries scored; 4. the most points scored; 5. the difference between tries for and tries against; 6. the fewest red cards received; 7. the fewest yellow cards received.
Green background indicates teams that are playoff places that top their regional pools and earn a place in the 2023–24 European Champions Cup Blue background indicates teams that did not top their regional pool but are in play-off places and earn a place in the 2023–24 European Champions Cup; Pink background indicates teams that did not top their regional pool but are in play-off places, and earn a place in the 2023–24 European Challenge Cup; Yellow background indicates teams that top their regional pool and thus currently in a qualification place in the 2023–24 European Champions Cup, but are not in a play-off place Plain background indicates teams that earn a place in the 2023–24 European Challenge Cup. Q: qualified for play-offs. H: home field advantage secured for quarter-and semi-final. h; home field advantage secured for quarter-final X: cannot reach play-offs. E: qualified for Champions Cup.

==== Results ====
===== Round 1 =====
16 September 2022
5.30pm

(1BP) Benetton (Italy)	33 - 11	(Scotland) Glasgow Warriors
Try: Edoardo Padovani; Gianmarco Lucchesi; Ignacio Mendy x 2 Con: Rhyno Smith x 2 Pen: Rhyno Smith x 3	Preview; Report; Report; Report	Try: Zander Fagerson; Con: George Horne x 2

Stadio Comunale di Monigo
Attendance: 1,971
Referee: Frank Murphy (IRFU)

===== Round 2 =====
23 September 2022
7.35pm

(1BP) Glasgow Warriors (Scotland)	52 - 24	(Wales) Cardiff
Try: Fraser Brown x 2 Cole Forbes; Matt Fagerson; George Horne; Zander Fagerson; Thomas Gordon; Stafford McDowall; Con: George Horne x 7	Preview; Report; Report; Report	Try: Josh Adams; Kristian Dacey; Liam Belcher; Con: Jarrod Evans x 2 Rhys Priestland

Scotstoun Stadium
Attendance: 5,790
Referee: Chris Busby (IRFU)

===== Round 3 =====
1 October 2022
3.05pm

(1BP) Ospreys (Wales)	32 - 17	(Scotland) Glasgow Warriors
Try: Keelan Giles x 2 George North; Reuben Morgan-Williams; Con: Gareth Anscombe; Jack Walsh x 2 Pen: Gareth Anscombe; Jack Walsh	Preview; Report; Report; Report	Try: Oli Kebble; Thomas Gordon; Con: Domingo Miotti x 2 Pen: Tom Jordan

Swansea.com Stadium
Attendance: 4,398
Referee: Jaco Peyper (SARU)

===== Round 4 =====
8 October 2022
7.35pm

(1BP) Glasgow Warriors (Scotland)	35 - 21	(South Africa) Bulls
Try: Matt Fagerson; Sebastián Cancelliere; Scott Cummings; George Horne; Josh McKay; Con: George Horne x 5	Preview; Report; Report; Report	Try: Kurt-Lee Arendse; Bismarck du Plessis; Janko Swanepoel; Con: Chris Smith x 2 Morné Steyn

Scotstoun Stadium
Attendance: 5,855
Referee: Andrew Brace (IRFU)

===== Round 5 =====
15 October 2022
3.05pm

(1BP) Sharks (South Africa)	40 - 12	(Scotland) Glasgow Warriors
Try: Anthony Volmink x 2 Bongi Mbonambi; Aphelele Fassi; Werner Kok; Con: Boeta Chamberlain x 3 Pen: Boeta Chamberlain x 3	Preview; Report; Report; Report	Try: Thomas Gordon x 2 Con: Tom Jordan

Kings Park Stadium
Attendance: 12,657
Referee: Chris Busby (IRFU)

===== Round 6 =====
22 October 2022
3.05pm

Lions (South Africa)	postponed	(Scotland) Glasgow Warriors
	Postponement

Ellis Park Stadium

===== Round 7 =====
28 October 2022
7.35pm

(1 BP) Glasgow Warriors (Scotland)	37 - 0	(Italy) Benetton
Try: Sione Vailanu x 2 Sebastián Cancelliere; Stafford McDowall; Fraser Brown; Rufus McLean; Con: Domingo Miotti x 2 Pen: Domingo Miotti	Preview; Report; Report; Report

Scotstoun Stadium
Attendance: 6,035
Referee: Craig Evans

===== Round 8 =====
26 November 2022
3.15pm

(1 BP) Leinster (Ireland)	40 - 5	Glasgow Warriors (Scotland)
Try: Dave Kearney; Rob Russell x 3 Michael Milne; John McKee; Con: Ross Byrne x 4 Harry Byrne	Preview; Report; Report; Report	Try: Sebastián Cancelliere

RDS Arena
Attendance: 14,153
Referee: Marius van der Westhuizen (SARU)

===== Round 9 =====
3 December 2022
1pm

Zebre Parma (Italy)	17 - 45	(Scotland) Glasgow Warriors (1 BP)
Try: Pierre Bruno; Jacques du Toit x 2 Con: Prisciantelli	Preview; Report; Report; Report	Try: Sintu Manjezi; Sebastián Cancelliere; Stafford McDowall; Johnny Matthews x 2 Domingo Miotti; Con: George Horne x 6 Pen: George Horne

Stadio Sergio Lanfranchi
Attendance: 1,800
Referee: Tual Trainini (FRF)

===== Round 10 – 1872 Cup 1st leg =====
23 December 2022
7.35pm

Glasgow Warriors (Scotland)	16 - 10	(Scotland) Edinburgh (1BP)
Try: Jack Dempsey; Con: George Horne; Pen: George Horne; Tom Jordan x 2	Preview; Report; Report; Report	Try: Connor Boyle; Con: Emiliano Boffelli; Pen: Jaco van der Walt

Scotstoun Stadium
Attendance: 7,338
Referee: Ben Blain (SRU)

===== Round 11 - 1872 Cup 2nd leg =====
30 December 2022
7.35pm

(1 BP) Edinburgh (Scotland)	25 - 32	(Scotland) Glasgow Warriors (1 BP)
Try: Jamie Ritchie; Luke Crosbie; Patrick Harrison; Con: Emiliano Boffelli x 2 Pen: Emiliano Boffelli x 2	Preview; Report; Report; Report	Try: Kyle Steyn; Matt Fagerson; Tom Jordan; George Horne; Con: Tom Jordan x 2 George Horne; Pen: George Horne x 2

Murrayfield Stadium
Attendance: 25,137
Referee: Sam Grove-White (SRU)

===== Round 12 =====
8 January 2023
3pm

(1BP) Glasgow Warriors (Scotland)	24 - 17	(South Africa) Stormers (1BP)
Try: Sebastián Cancelliere x 2 Kyle Steyn; Huw Jones; Con: George Horne; Domingo Miotti	Preview; Report; Report; Report	Try: Joseph Dweba; Clayton Blommetjies; Junior Pokomela; Con: Manie Libbok

Scotstoun Stadium
Attendance: 6,452
Referee: Andrew Brace (IRFU)

===== Round 13 =====
28 January 2023
3pm

(1BP) Dragons (Wales)	28 - 42	(Scotland) Glasgow Warriors (1BP)
Try: Rhodri Williams; Sio Tomkinson; Taine Basham; Christian Coleman; Con: JJ Hanrahan x 4	Preview; Report; Report; Report	Try: Cole Forbes; Fraser Brown x 2 Duncan Weir; Stafford McDowall; Sebastián Cancelliere; Con: Duncan Weir x 5 Tom Jordan

Rodney Parade
Attendance: 4,624
Referee: Frank Murphy (IRFU)

===== Round 14 =====
17 February 2023
7.35pm

Glasgow Warriors (Scotland)	17 - 11	(Ireland) Ulster (1BP)
Try: Sione Vailanu; Jack Dempsey; Fraser Brown; Con: Duncan Weir	Preview; Report; Report; Report	Try: Harry Sheridan; Pen: Nathan Doak; John Cooney

Scotstoun Stadium
Attendance: 7,338
Referee: Craig Evans

===== Round 6 rescheduled =====
25 February 2023
2.15pm

(1 BP) Lions (South Africa)	35 - 24	(Scotland) Glasgow Warriors (1 BP)
Try: Sanele Nohamba; Francke Horn; Mannie Rass; Edwill van der Merwe; Ruan Venter; Con: Gianni Lombard x 2 Pen: Gianni Lombard x 2	Preview; Report; Report; Report	Try: Eli Caven; Cole Forbes; Tom Jordan; Thomas Gordon; Con: Tom Jordan x 2

Ellis Park Stadium
Attendance: 8,014
Referee: Adam Jones (WRU)

===== Round 15 =====
3 March 2023
7.35pm

(1BP) Glasgow Warriors (Scotland)	50 - 8	(Italy) Zebre Parma
Try: Johnny Matthews x 3 JP du Preez; Stafford McDowall; Josh McKay; Thomas Gordon; Fraser Brown; Con: George Horne x 4 Duncan Weir	Preview; Report; Report; Report	Try: Chris Cook; Pen: Jacopo Trulla

Scotstoun Stadium
Attendance: 6,126
Referee: Chris Busby (IRFU)

===== Round 16 =====
25 March 2023
17:15

(1 BP) Munster (Ireland)	26–38	(Scotland) Glasgow Warriors (1 BP)
Try: G. Coombes 53' c Casey 57' c J. Wycherley 70' c Nash 77' m Con: Carbery (2/2) 53', 57'; Crowley (1/2) 70'	Preview; Report; Report; Report	Try: F. Brown 5' c McDowall 24' c Miotti 31' c Forbes 39' c Vailanu 60' c Con: Miotti (5/5) 6', 25', 32', 40', 62'; Drop: Miotti (1/1) 44'

Thomond Park
Attendance: 17,097
Referee: Andrea Piardi (FIR)

===== Round 17 =====
14 April 2023
7.35pm

Glasgow Warriors (Scotland)	12 - 9	(Wales) Scarlets (1BP)
Try: Sione Vailanu; Fraser Brown; Con: Tom Jordan	Preview; Report; Report; Report	Con: Dan Jones x 3

Scotstoun Stadium
Attendance: 6,815
Referee: Chris Busby (IRFU)

===== Round 18 =====
22 April 2023
7.35pm

(1BP) Glasgow Warriors (Scotland)	29 - 27	(Ireland) Connacht
Try: Huw Jones; Tom Jordan; Ali Price; Johnny Matthews; Con: Tom Jordan x 2 George Horne; Pen: George Horne	Preview; Report; Report; Report	Try: Penalty try Cian Prendergast; Shamus Hurley-Langton; Con: Jack Carty x 2 Pen: Jack Carty x 2

Scotstoun Stadium
Attendance: 6,589
Referee: Gianluca Gnecchi (FIR)

===== Play-offs =====
====== Quarter-final ======
6 May 2023
7.35pm

Glasgow Warriors (Scotland)	5 - 14	(Ireland) Munster
Try: Kyle Steyn	Preview; Report; Report; Report	Try: Malakai Fekitoa; Antoine Frisch; Con: Jack Crowley x 2

Scotstoun Stadium
Attendance: 6,943
Referee: Andrea Piardi (FIR)

=== European Challenge Cup ===
After a poor season under the previous head coach Danny Wilson, Glasgow Warriors found themselves unusually in the European Challenge Cup, for only the fourth time in their history, and the first time since the 2006–07 season.

Glasgow Warriors were drawn against English side Bath Rugby and French side Perpignan in the European Challenge Cup pool stage.

The first match was an away fixture at Bath. Glasgow won the match, with Franco Smith saying: "We knew it was going to be a tough game, but we knew if we stuck to our processes and kept to our loose, fast game, we would get the result and we did."

Due to the freezing temperatures, the pitch at Scotstoun was deemed unplayable early and the home tie for Glasgow against Perpignan switched to Edinburgh's Murrayfield Stadium. It didn't upset the Warriors rhythm too much and they won 26 - 18. Huw Jones said: "A five-point win and a bonus point win is great. We will take the result and move on in the competition. We definitely didn’t get everything right, we ground it out and it was ugly but we will take the five points. There is lots to fix ahead of next week."

A couple of yellow cards - Ollie Smith then Tom Gordon - in the match didn't stop the Warriors winning 26 - 40 away to Perpignan, securing another 5 point bonus point victory. Richie Gray said: "The start was obviously a bit ropey for us with the early yellow card and letting them in for an early try, but I thought we fought our way back into the game well. We could have been more direct at times throughout that game, too, and our discipline was nowhere near where we want it to be, so it wasn’t the perfect performance by any means. However, it’s 40 points at a tough venue in France, and it’s a bonus-point win that’s incredibly important in the context of the competition."

The Warriors only needed 1 point more to secure a last 16 spot. The match against Bath at Scotstoun saw the English side prove difficult to finish off. Duncan Weir missed a penalty at the end to win the match and the score ended in a draw. Last 16 spot secured then but the players were unhappy. Josh Mckay said: "We are pretty gutted – obviously we would have loved have come away with the win. We made it hard for ourselves, was a bit scrappy at the end. We couldn’t win our breakdown and there were a few too many errors."

The last 16 match against the Dragons proved another extraordinary result in which records tumbled. The Warriors won with 73 points, posting their highest ever score; even beating the friendly match result against Dundee HSFP in 2010–11 season where the Warriors won with 71 points. They scored 11 tries in the process against the Welsh side; their most tries in a match. Hooker Jonny Matthews broke the individual try scoring record in a match, notching 5 tries. Yet again, though, the squad were unhappy, in letting Dragons score 33 points in return. Franco Smith explained: "There was a conversation in the changing room - I don't want to say we are disappointed, but we are not completely happy with how it went. That's the group - not me. The fact that we've allowed them to score three tries with only 14 players on the field hurts. The fact they scored any points hurts for us because it's our objective to be as good as we can be on both sides of the ball."

The Dragons victory set up a quarter final against the Lions, the team that last beat the Warriors back in February 2023. This was the Warriors fourth European quarter final; the previous three others all away against the Saracens, with their first match up being in the Challenge Cup back in that 2006–07 season. This Lions home fixture proved a scrappy and nervy match for the Warriors, but they were never in trouble throughout and they scored 4 tries to win the match 31 - 21. Franco Smith said: " I can say that we haven’t been in this situation where we’re playing for a semi-final. The club’s first home quarter-final – they’re excited – so there’s a lot of expectation around the team from players who have been playing well the whole season. That is the lesson that we’ll take from that and we’ll manage the emotion better this week. It’s a little bit of uncharted territory at the moment."

The semi final match against Scarlets proved a game of two halves. Glasgow Warriors took the lead but lost their way in the middle of the first half and thereafter Scarlets applied the pressure. The Scarlets topped the first half 14–7, albeit with the Warriors having 62% possession, though the Welsh side could have been further up. With a half time team talk, the Warriors came out and started to play - and the tries came. The only time that Scarlets looked as if they could get into the match was when Ollie Smith made a failed interception and the referee went to the TMO for a potential yellow card. As Smith got another hand to his own interception, the referee then judged there was a reasonable expectation of a regather, and the result was only a knock on. The Warriors won the match by five tries to one and deservedly went on to the final. Franco Smith said: "They didn’t want to lose tonight, and I thought we started off so well, but we got a little bit jittery. But the plan didn’t change. The plan was specific for this week, and I thought we stuck to that even though Scarlets did extremely well to unsettle us and rattle us. I’m proud of the boys because solving problems in-game and on the field is something we’ve been working on all season."

The final against Toulon saw the French side race out of the blocks. They scored 3 tries in the first half, and despite a number of entries into Toulon's 22 Glasgow Warriors came away empty-handed in that half. It was a mark of how well Toulon pressurised Glasgow. The second half started the same way with a penalty to Toulon, but the Warriors finally grew into the match and started with tries of their own. However this was too little and too late and Toulon ended winning 43–19. Smith said: "We have to be clinical but that has been a learning for the team throughout the season. This is season one for this group. This is not the end for us, this is just the start. It’s a stepping stone. Obviously we wanted to win it – that would have been the perfect stepping stone – but there are still improvements to be made in the main components of our game."

==== Pool A table ====
Pool A
Team	P	W	D	L	PF	PA	Diff	TF	TA	TB	LB	Pts
(France) Toulon	4	4	0	0	102	56	+46	14	8	3	0	19
(Scotland) Glasgow Warriors	4	3	1	0	107	82	+25	16	10	2	0	16
(Wales) Cardiff	4	3	0	1	154	57	+97	23	7	3	0	15
(England) Bristol Bears	4	4	0	0	121	54	+67	19	8	3	0	14*
(Ireland) Connacht	4	3	0	1	135	72	+63	19	10	2	0	14
(France) Brive	4	1	0	3	66	157	–91	9	23	1	1	6
(England) Newcastle Falcons	4	1	0	3	63	132	–69	8	19	1	0	5
(England) Bath	4	0	1	3	68	105	–37	8	14	0	1	3
(France) Perpignan	4	0	0	4	68	118	–50	10	18	1	0	1
(Italy) Zebre Parma	4	0	0	4	56	107	–51	8	17	0	1	1
Green background (rows 1 to 6) are qualification places for the Challenge Cup round of 16. Starting table — source: EPCR * Bristol Bears were deducted 5 match points for selecting an ineligible player

==== Results ====
===== Round 1 =====
10 December 2022
1pm

(1 BP) Bath (England)	19–22	(Scotland) Glasgow Warriors
Try: Wesley White; Fergus Lee-Warner; Matt Gallagher; Con: Piers Francis	Preview; Report; Report; Report	Try: Lewis Bean; George Turner; Huw Jones; Con: Domingo Miotti x 2 Pen: Duncan Weir

Recreation Ground
Attendance: 11,251
Referee: Adrien Marbot (FRF)

===== Round 2 =====
16 December 2022
8pm

(1BP) Glasgow Warriors (Scotland)	26 - 18	(France) Perpignan
Try: Rufus McLean; Huw Jones; Penalty try Sebastián Cancelliere; Con: Duncan Weir x 2	Preview; Report; Report; Report	Try: Jake McIntyre; Dorian Laborde; Con: Dorian Laborde; Pen: Dorian Laborde x 2

Murrayfield Stadium
Attendance: 671
Referee: Anthony Woodthorpe (England)

===== Round 3 =====
14 January 2023
8pm

(1BP) Perpignan (France)	26 - 40	(Scotland) Glasgow Warriors (1BP)
Try: Edward Sawailau; Nino Seguela; Matteo Rodor; Posolo Tuilagi; Con: Edward Sawailau; Matteo Rodor x 2	Preview; Report; Report; Report	Try: Sam Johnson; Richie Gray; Stafford McDowall; Johnny Matthews; Ollie Smith; Josh McKay; Con: Domingo Miotti; Duncan Weir x 4

Stade Aimé Giral
Attendance: 5,000
Referee: Craig Evans (WRU)

===== Round 4 =====
20 January 2023
8pm

Glasgow Warriors (Scotland)	19 - 19	(England) Bath Rugby
Try: Matt Fagerson; Sione Vailanu; Sebastián Cancelliere; Con: Tom Jordan x 2	Preview; Report; Report; Report	Try: Chris Cloete; Con: Piers Francis; Pen: Piers Francis x 2 Orlando Bailey; Ben Spencer

Scotstoun Stadium
Attendance: 6,965
Referee: Luc Ramos (France)

==== Round of 16 ====
1 April 2023
5.30pm

Glasgow Warriors (Scotland)	73 - 33	(Wales) Dragons
Try: George Horne; Johnny Matthews x 5 George Turner; Cole Forbes; Huw Jones; Kyle Steyn x 2 Con: George Horne x 8 Domingo Miotti	Preview; Report; Report; Report	Try: Jordan Williams; Rio Dyer; Jared Rosser; Elliot Dee x 2 Con: Will Reed x 4

Scotstoun Stadium
Attendance: 5,140
Referee: Tual Trainini (France)

==== Quarter-Final ====
8 April 2023
8pm

Glasgow Warriors (Scotland)	31 - 21	(South Africa) Lions
Try: Jack Dempsey; Jamie Dobie; Zander Fagerson; Tom Jordan; Con: George Horne x 4 Pen: George Horne	Preview; Report; Report; Report	Try: Sanele Nohamba; Francke Horn; Morné Brandon; Con: Sanele Nohamba x2 Gianni Lombard

Scotstoun Stadium
Attendance: 4,249
Referee: Matthew Carley (England)

==== Semi-Final ====
29 April 2023
5.30pm

Scarlets (Wales)	17 - 35	(Scotland) Glasgow Warriors
Try: Steff Evans; Pen: Sam Costelow x 4	Preview; Report; Report; Report	Try: Stafford McDowall x 2 George Horne; Johnny Matthews; Rory Darge; Con: George Horne x 5

Parc y Scarlets
Attendance: 13,077
Referee: Mathieu Raynal (FRF)

==== Final ====
19 May 2023
8pm

Toulon (France)	43 - 19	(Scotland) Glasgow Warriors
Try: Baptiste Serin x 2 Sergio Parisse; Jiuta Wainiqolo; Waisea Nayacalevu; Ihaia West; Con: Baptiste Serin x 3 Benoît Paillaugue x 2 Pen: Benoît Paillaugue	Preview; Report; Report; Report	Try: Kyle Steyn x 2 Sebastián Cancelliere; Con: George Horne x 2

Aviva Stadium
Attendance: 31,514
Referee: Wayne Barnes (RFU)

== Warrior of the month awards ==
Award	Winner
September	(Scotland) George Horne
October	(Argentina) Sebastián Cancelliere
November	(Tonga) Sione Vailanu
December	(Scotland) Sione Tuipulotu
January	(Argentina) Sebastián Cancelliere
February	(Scotland) Stafford McDowall
March	(Scotland) Sam Johnson
April	(Scotland) Rory Darge
May	No announcement

== End of Season awards ==
Award	Winner
Breakthrough Player of the Season	(New Zealand) Tom Jordan
Coaches Award	(Scotland) Stafford McDowall
Test Player of the Season	(Scotland) Huw Jones
Most Improved Player of the Season	(South Africa) Nathan McBeth
Al Kellock Leadership Award	(Scotland) Kyle Steyn
Community Hero of the Year	Caroline Campbell Montrose and District and Steven McCooey Strathendrick
Try of the Season	(Scotland) Huw Jones vs. (Wales) Dragons
Players' Player of the Season	(Argentina) Sebastián Cancelliere
Player of the Season	(Scotland) George Horne

== Competitive debuts this season ==
A player's nationality shown is taken from the nationality at the highest honour for the national side obtained; or if never capped internationally their place of birth. Senior caps take precedence over junior caps or place of birth; junior caps take precedence over place of birth. A player's nationality at debut may be different from the nationality shown. Combination sides like the British and Irish Lions or Pacific Islanders are not national sides, or nationalities.

Players in BOLD font have been capped by their senior international XV side as nationality shown.

Players in Italic font have capped either by their international 7s side; or by the international XV 'A' side as nationality shown.

Players in normal font have not been capped at senior level.

A position in parentheses indicates that the player debuted as a substitute. A player may have made a prior debut for Glasgow Warriors in a non-competitive match, 'A' match or 7s match; these matches are not listed.

Tournaments where competitive debut made:

**Scottish Inter-District Championship**	**Welsh–Scottish League**	**WRU Challenge Cup**	**Celtic League**	**Celtic Cup**	**1872 Cup**	**Pro12**	**Pro14**	**Rainbow Cup**	**United Rugby Championship**	**European Challenge Cup**	**Heineken Cup / European Champions Cup**

Crosshatching indicates a jointly hosted match.

Number	Player nationality	Name	Position	Date of debut	Venue	Stadium	Opposition nationality	Opposition side	Tournament	Match result	Scoring debut
341	(Argentina)	**Lucio Sordoni**	Prop	2022-09-16	Away	Stadio Comunale di Monigo	(Italy)	Benetton Treviso	United Rugby Championship	Loss	Nil
342	(South Africa)	Sintu Manjezi	Flanker	2022-09-16	Away	Stadio Comunale di Monigo	(Italy)	Benetton Treviso	United Rugby Championship	Loss	Nil
343	(New Zealand)	Tom Jordan	Fly half	2022-09-16	Away	Stadio Comunale di Monigo	(Italy)	Benetton Treviso	United Rugby Championship	Loss	Nil
344	(South Africa)	JP du Preez	(Lock)	2022-09-23	Home	Scotstoun Stadium	(Wales)	Cardiff Rugby	United Rugby Championship	Win	Nil
345	(Tonga)	**Sione Vailanu**	(Flanker)	2022-10-15	Away	Kings Park Stadium	(South Africa)	Sharks	United Rugby Championship	Loss	Nil
346	(Scotland)	Alex Samuel	Lock	2022-10-28	Home	Scotstoun Stadium	(Italy)	Benetton Treviso	United Rugby Championship	Win	Nil
347	(Scotland)	Euan Ferrie	(Flanker)	2021-10-28	Home	Scotstoun Stadium	(Italy)	Benetton Treviso	United Rugby Championship	Win	Nil
348	(England)	Cameron Neild	Flanker	2021-12-10	Away	Recreation Ground	(England)	Bath	European Challenge Cup	Win	Nil
349	(Scotland)	Jack Mann	No. 8	2021-12-10	Away	Recreation Ground	(England)	Bath	European Challenge Cup	Win	Nil
350	(Scotland)	Angus Fraser	(Hooker)	2021-12-10	Away	Recreation Ground	(England)	Bath	European Challenge Cup	Win	Nil
351	(England)	Eli Caven	Wing	2023-02-25	Away	Ellis Park Stadium	(South Africa)	Lions	United Rugby Championship	Loss	5pts
352	(Scotland)	**Allan Dell**	(Prop)	2023-02-25	Away	Ellis Park Stadium	(South Africa)	Lions	United Rugby Championship	Loss	Nil

== Sponsorship ==
- SP Energy Networks – Title Sponsor and Community Sponsor
- Scottish Power – Official Kit

=== Official kit supplier ===
- Macron

=== Official kit sponsors ===
- Malcolm Group
- McCrea Financial Services
- Denholm Oilfield
- Ross Hall Hospital
- Story Contracting
- Leidos

=== Official sponsors ===
- The Famous Grouse
- Clyde Travel Management
- Harper Macleod
- Caledonia Best
- Eden Mill Brewery and Distillery
- David Lloyd Leisure
- Crabbie's
- Cala Homes
- Capital Solutions
- Martha's Restaurant
- Sterling Furniture

=== Official partners ===
- A.G. Barr
- Benchmarx
- Black & Lizars
- Cameron House
- Glasgow Airport
- Healthspan Elite
- KubeNet
- Mentholatum
- MSC Nutrition
- Smile Plus
- Lenco Utilities
- Scot JCB News Scotland
- HF Group
- Primestaff
- Village Hotel Club
- The Crafty Pig
- Kooltech
- Savills
- iPro Sports
- RHA
