= List of 2022–23 Premiership Rugby transfers =

This is a list of player transfers involving Premiership Rugby teams before or during the 2022–23 season.

The list is of deals that are confirmed and are either from or to a rugby union team in the Premiership during the 2021–22 season. It is not unknown for confirmed deals to be cancelled at a later date.

== Bath ==
=== Players In ===
- (England) Orlando Bailey promoted from Academy
- (England) Max Ojomoh promoted from Academy
- (Ireland) Niall Annett from (England) Worcester Warriors
- (England) Matt Gallagher from (Ireland) Munster
- (South Africa) Wesley White from Jersey Reds
- (South Africa) Louis Schreuder from (England) Newcastle Falcons
- (South Africa) Chris Cloete from (Ireland) Munster
- (England) Dave Attwood from (England) Bristol Bears
- (England) Piers Francis from (England) Northampton Saints
- (England) Ewan Richards promoted from Academy
- (England) JJ Tonks from (England) Northampton Saints
- (Wales) Louie Hennessey from (Wales) Cardiff
- (South Africa) GJ van Velze from (Israel) Tel Aviv Heat
- (Namibia) Aranos Coetzee from (South Africa) Free State Cheetahs (short-term deal)
- (Ireland) Quinn Roux from (France) Toulon
- (England) Michael Etete from (England) Leeds Tykes
- (Russia) Valery Morozov from (England) Worcester Warriors
- (England) Ollie Lawrence from (England) Worcester Warriors
- (Australia) Fergus Lee-Warner from (England) Worcester Warriors
- (England) Billy Searle from (England) Worcester Warriors (short-term deal)
- (England) Jamie Shillcock from (England) Worcester Warriors (short-term deal)
- (England) Ted Hill from (England) Worcester Warriors
- (England) Alfie Barbeary from (England) Wasps
- (South Africa) Daniel Marais from (South Africa) Paul Roos Gymnasium
- (South Africa) Luke Graham from (South Africa) Paul Roos Gymnasium
- (England) Harvey Cuckson from (England) Worcester Warriors
- (England) Elliot Millar-Mills from (England) Wasps (short-term deal)

=== Players Out ===
- (Wales) Taulupe Faletau to (Wales) Cardiff
- (England) Max Clark to (Wales) Dragons
- (England) Semesa Rokoduguni to (France) Montauban
- (Russia) Valery Morozov to (England) Worcester Warriors
- (South Africa) Tian Schoeman to (England) Newcastle Falcons
- (England) Danny Cipriani released
- (England) Anthony Watson to (England) Leicester Tigers
- (South Africa) Jacques du Toit to (Italy) Zebre Parma
- (England) Ollie Fox to (England) Ealing Trailfinders
- (England) Harry Casson released
- (Tonga) Ma'afu Fia returned to (Wales) Ospreys
- (Wales) Tom Prydie released
- (England) Joe Simpson returned to (England) Gloucester
- (England) Will Vaughan released
- (Namibia) Aranos Coetzee to (South Africa) Free State Cheetahs
- (England) Jamie Shillcock to (Japan) Mitsubishi DynaBoars
- (England) Billy Searle released
- (Zimbabwe) Mike Williams to (England) Exeter Chiefs
- (England) Tom Ellis to (England) Saracens (short-term loan)
- (England) Tom Ellis to (England) Sale Sharks
- (England) Lewis Boyce to (England) Ealing Trailfinders
- (England) Michael Etete released
- (England) Charlie Ewels to (South Africa) Bulls (short-term loan)

== Bristol Bears ==
=== Players In ===
- (United States) AJ MacGinty from (England) Sale Sharks
- (England) Ellis Genge from (England) Leicester Tigers
- (Scotland) Magnus Bradbury from (Scotland) Edinburgh
- (England) Gabriel Ibitoye from (Israel) Tel Aviv Heat
- (England) James Williams from (England) Hartpury University
- (England) Rhys Charalambous from (England) Leeds Beckett University
- (England) Fred Davies from (England) Durham University
- (Ireland) Martin Mulhall from (Wales) Swansea University
- (England) Richard Lane from (England) Bedford Blues
- (Spain) Jono Benz-Salomon from (England) Hartpury University
- (Spain) Toti Benz-Salomon from (England) Hartpury University
- (Wales) Oscar Lennon from (England) Hartpury University
- (England) Joe Owen from (England) Clifton
- (England) Morgan Eames from (France) Béziers
- (Wales) Sam Lewis from (England) Worcester Warriors
- (England) Joe Batley from (England) Worcester Warriors
- (England) Will Porter from (England) Wasps
- (England) Jay Tyack from (England) Worcester Warriors (short-term deal)
- (England) Noah Heward from (England) Worcester Warriors
- (England) Elliott Stooke from (England) Wasps (short-term deal)

=== Players Out ===
- (England) Dave Attwood to (England) Bath
- (France) Antoine Frisch to (Ireland) Munster
- (New Zealand) John Afoa to (France) Vannes
- (Ireland) Niyi Adeolokun released
- (England) Joe Cotton released
- (Australia) Theo Strang released
- (England) James Dun to Jersey Reds (season-long loan)
- (England) Charlie Powell to Jersey Reds (season-long loan)
- (England) Tiff Eden to (Italy) Zebre Parma
- (England) Ashley Challenger to (France) Chartres
- (Ireland) Lucas Berti-Newman to (France) Montpellier
- (England) Nathan Hughes to (Japan) Black Rams Tokyo
- (Samoa) Alapati Leiua to (South Africa) Stormers
- (Scotland) Mitch Eadie to (Canada) Toronto Arrows
- (Ireland) Martin Mulhall to (England) Northampton Saints (short-term loan)
- (Wales) Dan Thomas to (Wales) Scarlets (short-term loan)
- (England) Jake Armstrong to (England) Doncaster Knights
- (Australia) Luke Morahan to (France) Bayonne
- (England) Elliott Stooke to (France) Montpellier
- (England) Tom Whiteley to (England) Leicester Tigers
- (England) Richard Lane to (England) Bedford Blues (short-term loan)
- (England) Andrew Turner to (New Zealand) Crusaders (short-term loan)

== Exeter Chiefs ==
=== Players In ===
- (Ireland) Jack Dunne from (Ireland) Leinster
- (Ireland) Rory O'Loughlin from (Ireland) Leinster
- (South Africa) Aidon Davis from (South Africa) Free State Cheetahs
- (Wales) Iestyn Harris from (Wales) Cardiff
- (South Africa) Ruben van Heerden from (South Africa) Sharks
- (Tonga) Solomone Kata from (New Zealand) Moana Pasifika
- (Australia) Scott Sio from (Australia) Brumbies
- (England) Jacob Morris from (England) University of Exeter
- (Scotland) Fin Richardson from (England) University of Exeter
- (England) Dan Frost from (England) Wasps
- (England) Alfie Bell from (England) Wasps
- (Wales) Immanuel Feyi-Waboso from (England) Wasps
- (England) Greg Fisilau from (England) Wasps
- (Zimbabwe) Mike Williams from (England) Bath
- (Georgia (country)) Nika Abuladze from (Georgia (country)) Black Lion
- (England) Ehren Painter from (England) Northampton Saints

=== Players Out ===
- (Scotland) Sam Skinner to (Scotland) Edinburgh
- (England) Jonny Hill to (England) Sale Sharks
- (Scotland) Sam Hidalgo-Clyne to (Italy) Benetton
- (England) Sean Lonsdale to (Wales) Dragons
- (England) Tom O'Flaherty to (England) Sale Sharks
- (England) Don Armand retired
- (England) Sam Nixon to (France) Grenoble
- (Australia) Jack Walsh to (Wales) Ospreys
- (England) Aaron Hinkley to (England) Northampton Saints
- (England) Alfie Petch to (England) Northampton Saints
- (England) Jordon Poole to (England) Coventry
- (England) Shea Cornish to (England) Coventry (season-long loan)
- (England) Danny Southworth to (England) Coventry (season-long loan)
- (England) Will Witty to (France) Perpignan
- (South Africa) Ruben van Heerden to (South Africa) Stormers
- (Argentina) Santiago Grondona to (France) Pau
- (Argentina) Facundo Cordero to (Scotland) Glasgow Warriors

== Gloucester ==
=== Players In ===
- (Fiji) Albert Tuisue from (England) London Irish
- (England) George Barton promoted from Academy
- (England) Jack Clement promoted from Academy
- (Italy) Stephen Varney promoted from Academy
- (Argentina) Mayco Vivas from (Argentina) Jaguares XV
- (England) Seb Atkinson from (England) Worcester Warriors
- (England) Alex Hearle from (England) Worcester Warriors
- (England) Finn Theobald-Thomas from (England) Worcester Warriors
- (Wales) Josh Hathaway from (Wales) Scarlets
- (England) Archie MacArthur from (England) Wasps
- (South Africa) Gareth Blackmore from (South Africa) Western Province
- (England) Tom Miles from (England) Worcester Warriors
- (England) George McGuigan from (England) Newcastle Falcons

=== Players Out ===
- (England) Will Britton to (England) Cornish Pirates
- (England) Jack Stanley released
- (England) Olly Adkins to (England) Cornish Pirates (season-long loan)
- (England) Josh Gray to Jersey Reds (season-long loan)
- (England) Toby Venner to Jersey Reds
- (England) Seb Nagle-Taylor to (England) Cornish Pirates
- (England) Joe Simpson to (England) Sale Sharks
- (England) Ed Slater retired
- (New Zealand) Jason Woodward to (England) Sale Sharks
- (Scotland) Andrew Davidson to (England) Ealing Trailfinders

== Harlequins ==
=== Players In ===
- (England) Sam Riley promoted from Academy
- (England) Matas Jurevicius promoted from Academy
- (South Africa) Irné Herbst from (Italy) Benetton
- (Ireland) Jack Stafford promoted from Academy
- (England) George Hammond promoted from Academy
- (England) Jack Kenningham promoted from Academy
- (England) Jack Musk promoted from Academy
- (England) Charlie Matthews from (Japan) Kamaishi Seawaves
- (England) Lennox Anyanwu promoted from Academy
- (England) Fin Baxter promoted from Academy
- (England) Oscar Beard promoted from Academy
- (England) George Head promoted from Academy
- (England) Josh Bassett from (England) Wasps

=== Players Out ===
- (England) Hugh Tizard to (England) Saracens
- (England) Matt Symons retired
- (England) Joe Gray retired
- (Scotland) Huw Jones to (Scotland) Glasgow Warriors
- (Ireland) Craig Trenier retired
- (Scotland) Mak Wilson to (England) Doncaster Knights
- (England) Christian Scotland-Williamson retired
- (England) Kitan Ojo to (United States) Houston SaberCats (short-term loan)

== Leicester Tigers ==
=== Players In ===
- (South Africa) Handré Pollard from (France) Montpellier
- (Ireland) James Cronin from (France) Biarritz
- (England) Phil Cokanasiga from (England) London Irish
- (Wales) Olly Cracknell from (England) London Irish
- (New Zealand) Jimmy Gopperth from (England) Wasps
- (England) Anthony Watson from (England) Bath
- (United States) Joe Taufeteʻe from (United States) LA Giltinis
- (Australia) Lachlan Shelley from (Australia) Eastwood
- (Australia) Tom Horton from (Australia) NSW Waratahs (short-term deal)
- (England) Charlie Atkinson from (England) Wasps
- (England) Gabriel Oghre from (England) Wasps (short-term deal)
- (England) Sam Wolstenholme from (England) Wasps (short-term deal)
- (England) Tom West from (England) Wasps
- (South Africa) Cameron Miell from (South Africa) Paul Roos Gymnasium
- (England) Tom Whiteley from (England) Bristol Bears
- (England) Mike Brown from (England) Newcastle Falcons (short-term deal)

=== Players Out ===
- (England) George Ford to (England) Sale Sharks
- (England) Ellis Genge to (England) Bristol Bears
- (England) Jonny Law to Jersey Reds
- (Argentina) Matías Moroni to (England) Newcastle Falcons
- (England) Olly Robinson returned to (Wales) Cardiff
- (England) Jack Rowntree released
- (United States) Tomiwa Agbongbon to (England) Loughborough Students
- (South Africa) Jaco Taute retired
- (England) Sam Aspland-Robinson to (England) Rosslyn Park
- (England) Jordan Olowofela to (England) Nottingham
- (Argentina) Juan Pablo Socino to (Spain) UE Santboiana
- (Fiji) Nemani Nadolo to (Australia) NSW Waratahs
- (Australia) Bryce Hegarty to (Australia) Western Force
- (South Africa) Marco van Staden to (South Africa) Bulls
- (England) Gabriel Oghre to (France) Bordeaux
- (Australia) Lachlan Shelley released
- (England) Richard Wigglesworth retired
- (England) Freddie Burns to (New Zealand) Highlanders
- (England) Tom Cowan-Dickie to (Wales) Ospreys
- (Australia) Tom Horton to (Australia) Western Force
- (Samoa) Nephi Leatigaga to (Australia) NSW Waratahs
- (United States) Joe Taufete'e to (United States) Houston SaberCats

== London Irish ==
=== Players In ===
- (England) Tom Pearson promoted from Academy
- (Italy) Danilo Fischetti from (Italy) Zebre Parma
- (England) Will Joseph promoted from Academy
- (England) Henry Arundell promoted from Academy
- (Italy) Luca Morisi from (Italy) Benetton
- (England) Tom Hitchcock from (England) University of Exeter
- (England) Josh Basham from (England) Newcastle Falcons
- (England) Josh Caulfield from (England) Cornish Pirates
- (Wales) Ed Scragg from (England) Cornish Pirates
- (Fiji) Api Ratuniyarawa from (England) Northampton Saints
- (Australia) Joe Powell from (Australia) Melbourne Rebels
- (Samoa) So'otala Fa'aso'o from (France) Brive
- (Scotland) Isaac Miller from (England) Worcester Warriors
- (Scotland) Logan Trotter from (Scotland) Stirling County
- (Scotland) Patrick Harrison from (Scotland) Edinburgh (short-term loan)
- (England) Jamie Jack from (Scotland) Edinburgh (short-term loan)
- (Argentina) Ignacio Ruiz from (Argentina) Jaguares XV
- (Australia) Eddie Poolman from (Australia) Sydney University

=== Players Out ===
- (Fiji) Albert Tuisue to (England) Gloucester
- (New Zealand) Terrence Hepetema to (France) Grenoble
- (Tonga) Steve Mafi to (France) Oyonnax
- (Ireland) Seán O'Brien retired
- (Wales) George Nott to (Wales) Dragons
- (England) Phil Cokanasiga to (England) Leicester Tigers
- (Wales) Olly Cracknell to (England) Leicester Tigers
- (England) George Davis retired
- (Ireland) Jamie Dever released
- (England) Rory Morgan released
- (Ireland) Cillian Redmond released
- (England) Theo Smerdon retired
- (South Africa) Alandré van Rooyen released
- (England) Rory Brand to (Scotland) Watsonian
- (South Africa) Marcel van der Merwe to (France) Brive
- (Scotland) Allan Dell to (Scotland) Glasgow Warriors
- (Australia) Nick Phipps to (Japan) Green Rockets Tokatsu
- (Ireland) Noel Reid to (Canada) Toronto Arrows
- (Australia) Curtis Rona to (Japan) Mitsubishi DynaBoars
- (Wales) Ed Scragg to (Australia) Sydney University (short-term loan)
- (England) Luke Green to (United States) San Diego Legion (short-term loan)

== Newcastle Falcons ==
=== Players In ===
- (England) Freddie Lockwood promoted from Academy
- (England) Iwan Stephens promoted from Academy
- (South Africa) Tian Schoeman from (England) Bath
- (Spain) Josh Peters from (England) Doncaster Knights
- (England) Conrad Cade promoted from Academy
- (Wales) Josh Thomas from (Wales) Ospreys
- (South Africa) Sebastian de Chaves from (United States) Austin Gilgronis
- (England) Josh Barton from (England) Coventry
- (Argentina) Matías Moroni from (England) Leicester Tigers
- (Fiji) Vereimi Qorowale from (England) British Army
- (England) Elliott Obatoyinbo from (England) Saracens
- (Scotland) Alun Walker from (England) Ealing Trailfinders (short-term loan)
- (Argentina) Pedro Rubiolo from (Argentina) Jaguares XV
- (South Africa) Corbin Thunder from (England) Wasps
- (Ireland) Oisín Heffernan from (England) Northampton Saints (short-term loan)

=== Players Out ===
- (South Africa) Louis Schreuder to (England) Bath
- (England) Will Haydon-Wood to (England) Wasps
- (Scotland) Robbie Smith to (England) Northampton Saints
- (England) Rob Farrar to (England) Ealing Trailfinders
- (England) Will Montgomery to (England) Ealing Trailfinders
- (England) Josh Basham to (England) London Irish
- (England) Luther Burrell released
- (South Africa) Kyle Cooper released
- (England) Ollie Lindsay-Hague released
- (England) Mathew Ward to (England) Hartpury
- (England) Max Wright returned to (England) Bath
- (Italy) Marco Fuser to (France) Massy
- (England) Morgan Passman to (England) Darlington Mowden Park
- (England) Oscar Caudle to (England) Tynedale
- (England) Joel Hodgson to (United States) Utah Warriors
- (England) George Merrick to (France) Carcassonne
- (England) George McGuigan to (England) Gloucester
- (England) Nathan Earle to (England) Ealing Trailfinders
- (England) Mike Brown to (England) Leicester Tigers
- (England) Trevor Davison to (England) Northampton Saints

== Northampton Saints ==
=== Players In ===
- (Italy) Callum Braley from (Italy) Benetton
- (England) Ethan Waller from (England) Worcester Warriors
- (Australia) Lukhan Salakaia-Loto from (Australia) Queensland Reds
- (Australia) Angus Scott-Young from (Australia) Queensland Reds
- (England) Sam Graham from (England) Doncaster Knights
- (Scotland) Robbie Smith from (England) Newcastle Falcons
- (Australia) James Ramm from (Australia) NSW Waratahs
- (England) Aaron Hinkley from (England) Exeter Chiefs
- (England) Alfie Petch from (England) Exeter Chiefs
- (Ireland) Martin Mulhall from (England) Bristol Bears (short-term loan)
- (England) Fin Smith from (England) Worcester Warriors
- (England) Tom Cruse from (Scotland) Edinburgh
- (England) Trevor Davison from (England) Newcastle Falcons

=== Players Out ===
- (England) Teimana Harrison to (France) Provence
- (England) Piers Francis to (England) Bath
- (Ireland) Conor Carey released
- (New Zealand) Connor Tupai released
- (England) Ollie Newman to (England) Ealing Trailfinders
- (England) Tom Wood retired
- (England) Josh Gillespie to (England) Ealing Trailfinders
- (England) JJ Tonks to (England) Bath
- (England) Karl Garside to (England) Doncaster Knights
- (England) Nick Auterac to (Scotland) Edinburgh
- (Fiji) Api Ratuniyarawa to (England) London Irish
- (Samoa) Ahsee Tuala to (New Zealand) Counties Manukau
- (England) Leroy O'Neil to (England) Bury St Edmunds
- (England) Reece Marshall to (England) Chinnor
- (Australia) Taqele Naiyaravoro to (Japan) Green Rockets Tokatsu
- (England) Pete White to (England) Ampthill
- (England) Ethan Thorne to (France) Oyonnax
- (Australia) Duane RatuVilai Willemsen retired
- (Wales) Dan Biggar to (France) Toulon
- (Kenya) Josh Weru released
- (England) Ehren Painter to (England) Exeter Chiefs
- (Ireland) Oisín Heffernan to (England) Newcastle Falcons (short-term loan)
- (England) Aaron Hinkley released

== Sale Sharks ==
=== Players In ===
- (England) George Ford from (England) Leicester Tigers
- (England) Jonny Hill from (England) Exeter Chiefs
- (England) Tom O'Flaherty from (England) Exeter Chiefs
- (England) Joe Simpson from (England) Gloucester (short-term deal)
- (New Zealand) Jason Woodward from (England) Gloucester
- (England) Ryan Mills from (England) Wasps
- (England) Rekeiti Ma'asi-White from (England) Wasps
- (England) Asher Opoku from (England) Wasps
- (England) Alex Wills from (England) Worcester Warriors
- (England) Tom Ellis from (England) Bath

=== Players Out ===
- (United States) AJ MacGinty to (England) Bristol Bears
- (South Africa) JP du Preez to (Scotland) Glasgow Warriors
- (England) Curtis Langdon to (England) Worcester Warriors
- (England) Cameron Neild to (England) Worcester Warriors
- (South Africa) Faf de Klerk to (Japan) Yokohama Canon Eagles
- (South Africa) Rohan Janse van Rensburg to (South Africa) Sharks
- (England) Simon Hammersley retired
- (South Africa) Lood de Jager to (Japan) Saitama Wild Knights
- (England) Jack Metcalf to (England) Ealing Trailfinders
- (England) Joe Simpson retired
- (England) Marland Yarde to (France) Bayonne

== Saracens ==
=== Players In ===
- (England) Hugh Tizard from (England) Harlequins
- (England) Christian Judge from (England) Worcester Warriors
- (Argentina) Eduardo Bello from (Italy) Zebre Parma
- (England) James Flynn from Jersey Reds
- (England) Cameron Boon promoted from Academy
- (England) Sam Crean promoted from Academy
- (England) Theo Dan promoted from Academy
- (England) Josh Hallett promoted from Academy
- (England) Toby Knight promoted from Academy
- (England) Ollie Stonham promoted from Academy
- (England) Tom Howe from (England) Worcester Warriors (short-term deal)
- (England) Andrew Kitchener from (England) Worcester Warriors (short-term deal)
- (Scotland) Robin Hislop from (England) Wasps (short-term deal)
- (England) Gareth Simpson from (England) Worcester Warriors (short-term deal)
- (England) Olly Hartley from (England) Wasps
- (New Zealand) Declan Murphy from (England) Wasps
- (South Africa) Francois Hougaard from (England) Wasps (short-term deal)
- (England) Tom Ellis from (England) Bath (short-term loan)

=== Players Out ===
- (South Africa) Vincent Koch to (England) Wasps
- (England) Sean Reffell to (Ireland) Ulster
- (England) Richard Barrington to (France) Agen
- (Scotland) Tim Swinson retired
- (England) Charlie Watson released
- (England) Harvey Beaton to (England) Cornish Pirates (season-long loan)
- (England) Tom Mills to (England) Richmond
- (England) Elliott Obatoyinbo to (England) Newcastle Falcons
- (Namibia) Janco Venter to (South Africa) Griquas
- (Wales) Sam Wainwright to (Wales) Scarlets
- (England) Gareth Simpson to (Australia) Western Force

== Wasps ==
=== Players In ===
- (South Africa) Vincent Koch from (England) Saracens
- (Wales) Immanuel Feyi-Waboso from (Wales) Cardiff
- (England) Olly Hartley promoted from Academy
- (South Africa) Burger Odendaal from (South Africa) Lions
- (Scotland) Kiran McDonald from (Scotland) Glasgow Warriors
- (Ireland) John Ryan from (Ireland) Munster
- (England) Will Haydon-Wood from (England) Newcastle Falcons
- (England) Harry Craven from (England) Durham University
- (England) Cam Dodson from (United States) Austin Gilgronis
- (New Zealand) Declan Murphy from (New Zealand) Macleans College

=== Players Out ===
- (Wales) Thomas Young to (Wales) Cardiff
- (New Zealand) Vaea Fifita to (Wales) Scarlets
- (Tonga) Malakai Fekitoa to (Ireland) Munster
- (New Zealand) Jimmy Gopperth to (England) Leicester Tigers
- (England) Rob Miller released
- (New Zealand) Jeffrey Toomaga-Allen to (Ireland) Ulster
- (Jersey) Michael Le Bourgeois to (England) Bedford Blues
- (South Africa) Pieter Scholtz to (France) Bayonne
- (England) Marcus Watson to (Italy) Benetton
- (England) Alex Pleasants to (England) Leeds Tykes
- (England) James Gaskell to (Japan) Toyota Industries Shuttles Aichi
- (Scotland) Cameron Anderson to (England) London Scottish
- (England) Josh Bassett to (England) Harlequins
- (England) Biyi Alo to (France) Racing 92
- (England) Will Simonds to (England) Chinnor
- (England) Will Porter to (England) Bristol Bears
- (England) Cam Dodson to (France) Aurillac
- (Ireland) John Ryan to (Ireland) Munster
- (England) Brad Shields to (France) Perpignan
- (Scotland) Robin Hislop to (England) Saracens
- (South Africa) Vincent Koch to (France) Stade Français Paris
- (Italy) Paolo Odogwu to (France) Stade Français Paris
- (England) Dan Frost to (England) Exeter Chiefs
- (Scotland) Kiran McDonald to (Ireland) Munster
- (England) Charlie Atkinson to (England) Leicester Tigers
- (Italy) Matteo Minozzi to (Italy) Benetton
- (South Africa) Nizaam Carr to (South Africa) Bulls
- (England) Ryan Mills to (England) Sale Sharks
- (Ireland) Tom Bacon to (England) Ampthill
- (England) Rob Hardwick to (England) Ampthill
- (England) James Tunney to (England) Ampthill
- (England) Luke Mehson to (England) London Scottish
- (England) Theo Vukašinović to (England) Doncaster Knights
- (England) Ben Morris to (England) Birmingham Moseley
- (England) Tom Willis to (France) Bordeaux
- (England) Ali Crossdale to (France) Perpignan
- (England) Archie MacArthur to (England) Gloucester
- (England) Alfie Bell to (England) Exeter Chiefs
- (Wales) Immanuel Feyi-Waboso to (England) Exeter Chiefs
- (England) Greg Fisilau to (England) Exeter Chiefs
- (England) Dan Robson to (France) Pau
- (England) Fyn Brown to (England) Ampthill
- (England) Jacob Umaga to (Italy) Benetton
- (South Africa) Michael van Vuuren to (South Africa) Lions
- (England) Rekeiti Ma'asi-White to (England) Sale Sharks
- (England) Asher Opoku to (England) Sale Sharks
- (England) Olly Hartley to (England) Saracens
- (England) Joe Launchbury to (Japan) Toyota Verblitz
- (England) Alfie Barbeary to (England) Bath
- (England) Gabriel Oghre to (England) Leicester Tigers
- (England) Tom Cruse to (Scotland) Edinburgh
- (England) Will Haydon-Wood to (France) Massy
- (England) Jack Willis to (France) Toulouse
- (England) Sam Spink to (Australia) Western Force
- (South Africa) Burger Odendaal to (Japan) Toshiba Brave Lupus Tokyo
- (New Zealand) Declan Murphy to (England) Saracens
- (South Africa) Francois Hougaard to (England) Saracens
- (England) Elliott Stooke to (England) Bristol Bears
- (England) Eparama Rokodrava to (England) Ealing Trailfinders
- (England) Kieran Curran to (England) Bedford Blues
- (England) Elliot Millar-Mills to (England) Bath
- (England) Zach Kibirige to (Australia) Western Force
- (England) Tom West to (England) Leicester Tigers
- (England) Tim Cardall to (Australia) Melbourne Rebels
- (Italy) Pietro Turrisi to (France) Racing 92
- (South Africa) Corbin Thunder to (England) Newcastle Falcons

== Worcester Warriors ==
=== Players In ===
- (England) Curtis Langdon from (England) Sale Sharks
- (England) Cameron Neild from (England) Sale Sharks
- (Australia) Fergus Lee-Warner from (Australia) Western Force
- (Argentina) Santiago Medrano from (Australia) Western Force
- (Italy) Hame Faiva from (Italy) Benetton
- (Russia) Valery Morozov from (England) Bath
- (Italy) Renato Giammarioli from (Italy) Zebre Parma

=== Players Out ===
- (England) Ethan Waller to (England) Northampton Saints
- (Ireland) Niall Annett to (England) Bath
- (Tonga) Sione Vailanu to (Scotland) Glasgow Warriors
- (England) Matt Garvey retired
- (England) Christian Judge to (England) Saracens
- (England) Joe Morris released
- (Wales) Ben Murphy released
- (England) Joe Richardson released
- (Ivory Coast) Cheick Kone to (Italy) Colorno
- (England) James Scott to Jersey Reds
- (Scotland) Isaac Miller to (England) London Irish
- (Wales) Marc Thomas to (Wales) Cardiff RFC
- (Samoa) Melani Nanai to (New Zealand) Bay of Plenty
- (Ireland) Caleb Montgomery to (England) Ampthill
- (South Africa) Kyle Hatherell to (France) La Rochelle
- (Wales) Sam Lewis to (England) Bristol Bears
- (Italy) Renato Giammarioli to (France) Bordeaux
- (England) Ted Hill to (England) Bath
- (England) Ollie Lawrence to (England) Bath
- (Australia) Fergus Lee-Warner to (England) Bath
- (Russia) Valery Morozov to (England) Bath
- (Scotland) Duhan van der Merwe to (Scotland) Edinburgh
- (England) Joe Batley to (England) Bristol Bears
- (Scotland) Rory Sutherland to (Ireland) Ulster
- (England) Fin Smith to (England) Northampton Saints
- (England) Kai Owen to (England) Doncaster Knights
- (England) Tom Howe to (England) Saracens
- (England) Andrew Kitchener to (England) Saracens
- (England) Will Chudley to (England) Coventry
- (Scotland) Tom Dodd to (England) Coventry
- (England) Curtis Langdon to (France) Montpellier
- (South Africa) Francois Venter to (South Africa) Sharks
- (England) Seb Atkinson to (England) Gloucester
- (England) Alex Hearle to (England) Gloucester
- (England) Finn Theobold-Thomas to (England) Gloucester
- (Wales) Ashley Beck to (Wales) Merthyr
- (England) Billy Searle to (England) Bath
- (England) Jamie Shillcock to (England) Bath
- (England) Will Butler to (England) Hartpury University
- (Ireland) Oli Morris to (Ireland) Munster
- (Argentina) Santiago Medrano to (Australia) Western Force
- (England) Jay Tyack to (England) Bristol Bears
- (England) Noah Heward to (England) Bristol Bears
- (England) Gareth Simpson to (England) Saracens
- (England) Beck Cutting to (England) Ampthill
- (England) Cameron Neild to (Scotland) Glasgow Warriors
- (England) Matt Kvesic to (Italy) Zebre Parma
- (Wales) Owen Williams to (Wales) Ospreys
- (England) Lewis Holsey to (England) Bedford Blues
- (England) Tobi Wilson to (England) Birmingham Moseley
- (England) Harvey Cuckson to (England) Bath
- (England) Alex Wills to (England) Sale Sharks
- (England) Theo Mayall to (Wales) RGC 1404
- (England) Tom Miles to (England) Gloucester
- (England) Ollie Wynn to (England) Chester
- (England) Jack Forsythe to (England) Birmingham Moseley
- (Scotland) Murray McCallum to (Scotland) Edinburgh
- (England) Will Couch to (Wales) Scarlets
- (Italy) Hame Faiva to (New Zealand) Hurricanes
- (England) Tobi Wilson to (England) Coventry
- (Wales) Harri Doel to (Wales) Ospreys
- (Scotland) Jack Owlett to (England) Blackheath

== See also ==
- List of 2022–23 United Rugby Championship transfers
- List of 2022–23 RFU Championship transfers
- List of 2022–23 Super Rugby transfers
- List of 2022–23 Top 14 transfers
- List of 2022–23 Rugby Pro D2 transfers
- List of 2022–23 Major League Rugby transfers
