= 2022–23 Super 6 =

Rugby union Super 6 Championship

- Countries: Scotland
- Champions: Watsonians (1st title)
- Runners-up: Ayrshire Bulls

The 2022–23 Super 6 (also known as the Fosroc Super 6 for sponsorship reasons) is the third season of a semi-professional rugby union competition for Scotland's club sides. The season tournament for 2020–21 did not take place due to the COVID-19 pandemic.

The six teams competing in this season's Super 6 are Ayrshire Bulls, Boroughmuir Bears, Heriot's Rugby, Stirling Wolves, Watsonians and Southern Knights.

== Competition format ==
Super 6 consists of 3 different competitions involving the same six teams.

=== Super6 Championship ===
League Stage : Weeks One to Ten

All sides will play each other home and away in a double round robin, using the rugby points system.

League play-offs

Semi-Finals : The top 4 teams play off determine the finalist slots.

Final : The winners of the semi-finals compete in the final of the Super 6 tournament.

== Coronavirus pandemic ==
The fixtures announced are subject to Scottish Government regulations regarding the COVID-19 pandemic.

== Table ==
2022–23 Super 6 Table
| | Team | P | W | D | L | PF | PA | PD | TBP | LBP | PTS |
| 1 | Watsonians (CH) | 10 | 9 | 0 | 1 | 338 | 154 | +184 | 9 | 1 | 46 |
| 2 | Ayrshire Bulls (RU) | 10 | 9 | 0 | 1 | 347 | 133 | +214 | 8 | 0 | 44 |
| 3 | Boroughmuir Bears | 10 | 5 | 0 | 5 | 206 | 260 | -54 | 2 | 0 | 22 |
| 4 | Heriot's Rugby | 10 | 3 | 0 | 7 | 232 | 250 | -18 | 3 | 2 | 17 |
| 5 | Southern Knights | 10 | 2 | 0 | 8 | 166 | 275 | -109 | 2 | 1 | 11 |
| 6 | Stirling Wolves | 10 | 2 | 0 | 8 | 139 | 356 | -217 | 1 | 0 | 9 |
Yellow background indicates qualification for the final. Green background indicates semi-finalists. (CH) Champions. (RU) Runners-up.

== League stage rounds ==
All times are local.

=== Round 1 ===
5 August 2022
7.45pm

| (1BP) Ayrshire Bulls (Scotland) | 33 - 17 | (Scotland) Heriot's Rugby |
| Try: Eli Caven; Robert Beattie x 2 James Malcolm x 2 Con: Will Hunt x 4 | Preview; Report; Report | Try: Sam Pecqueur x 2 Con: Bruce Houston x 2 Pen: Bruce Houston |

Millbrae
Referee: Ruairidh Campbell (SRU)

6 August 2022
4pm

| Southern Knights (Scotland) | 12 - 36 | (Scotland) Watsonians (1BP) |
| Try: Sam Derrick; Struan Cessford; Con: David Colvine | Preview; Report | Try: Neil Irvine-Hess; Jason Baggott; Lewis Berg; Angus Guthrie; Karl Main; Con: Jason Baggott x 2 Lee Millar x 2 Pen: Jason Baggott |

The Greenyards
Referee: Jonny Perriam (SRU)

6 August 2022

| Stirling Wolves (Scotland) | 10 - 27 | (Scotland) Boroughmuir Bears |
| Try: Gregor Christie; Lewis Skinner | Report | Try: Scott Robeson; Craig Keddie; Callum Smith; Con: Jack Bergin x 3 Pen: Jack Bergin x 2 |

Bridgehaugh
Referee: Ian Kenny (SRU)

=== Round 2 ===
12 August 2022

| Southern Knights (Scotland) | 15 - 24 | (Scotland) Boroughmuir Bears (1BP) |
| Try: Fraser Renwick x 2 Cameron Scott | Report | Try: Corey Tait; Callum Ramm; Josh King; Joe Jenkins; Con: Jack Bergin x 2 |

The Greenyards
Referee: Ruairidh Campbell (SRU)

13 August 2022

| Stirling Wolves (Scotland) | 17 - 38 | (Scotland) Heriot's Rugby (1BP) |
| Try: Gregor Hiddleston; Euan Cunningham; Logan Jarvie; Con: Marcus Holden | Report; Report | Try: Lewis Govenlock; Jed Gelderbloom; Jack Mann x 2 Rory Steele; Con: Bruce Houston x 5 Pen: Bruce Houston |

Bridgehaugh Park
Referee: Jonny Perriam (SRU)

13 August 2022

| (1BP) Watsonians (Scotland) | 34 - 23 | (Scotland) Ayrshire Bulls |
| Try: Bobby Bratton; Harrison Courtney; Jason Baggott; Neil Irvine-Hess; Con: Lee Millar x 4 Pen: Lee Millar x 2 | Report | Try: Robert Beattie; Blair MacPherson; Con: Will Hunt; Richie Simpson; Pen: Elias Caven; Will Hunt x 2 |

Myreside Stadium
Referee: Finlay Brown (SRU)

=== Round 3 ===
19 August 2022

| Stirling Wolves (Scotland) | 3 - 20 | (Scotland) Southern Knights |
| Pen: Marcus Holden | Report | Try: Cameron Scott; Douglas Crawford; Con: David Colvine x 2 Pen: David Colvine x 2 |

Bridgehaugh Park
Referee: David Sutherland (SRU)

20 August 2022

| Ayrshire Bulls (Scotland) | 49 - 7 | (Scotland) Boroughmuir Bears |
| Try: Elias Caven x 3 Blair Macpherson; Aaron Tait; Jamie Shedden; Liam McNamara; Con: Richie Simpson x 6 Will Hunt | Report | Try: Marcus Goodwin; Con: Jack Bergin |

Millbrae
Referee: Jonny Perriam (SRU)

20 August 2022

| Heriot's Rugby (Scotland) | 12 - 27 | (Scotland) Watsonians |
| Try: Dan King; Jack Mann; Con: Bruce Houston | Report | Try: Lewis Berg; Lomond MacPherson; Jamie Berrisford x 2 Con: Lee Millar x 2 Pen: Lee Millar |

Goldenacre Sports Ground
Referee: Ian Kenny (SRU)

=== Round 4 ===
26 August 2022

| Ayrshire Bulls (Scotland) | 24 - 17 | (Scotland) Watsonians |

Millbrae

27 August 2022

| Boroughmuir Bears (Scotland) | 40 - 28 | (Scotland) Southern Knights |

Meggetland Sports Complex

27 August 2022

| Heriot's Rugby (Scotland) | 47 - 12 | (Scotland) Stirling Wolves |
| | Report |

Goldenacre Sports Ground

=== Round 5 ===
2 September 2022

| Boroughmuir Bears (Scotland) | 26 - 17 | (Scotland) Heriot's Rugby |

Meggetland Sports Complex

3 September 2022

| Watsonians (Scotland) | 66 - 7 | (Scotland) Stirling Wolves |

Myreside Stadium

10 September 2022

| Southern Knights (Scotland) | 5 - 31 | (Scotland) Ayrshire Bulls |

The Greenyards

=== Round 6 ===
16 September 2022

| Southern Knights (Scotland) | 21 - 31 | (Scotland) Heriot's Rugby |

The Greenyards

17 September 2022

| Stirling Wolves (Scotland) | 20 - 64 | (Scotland) Ayrshire Bulls |

Bridgehaugh Park

17 September 2022

| Watsonians (Scotland) | 31 - 10 | (Scotland) Boroughmuir Bears |

Myreside Stadium

=== Round 7 ===
23 September 2022

| Stirling Wolves (Scotland) | 21 - 33 | (Scotland) Watsonians |

Bridgehaugh Park

24 September 2022

| Ayrshire Bulls (Scotland) | 31 - 5 | (Scotland) Southern Knights |

Millbrae

24 September 2022

| Heriot's Rugby (Scotland) | 22 - 25 | (Scotland) Boroughmuir Bears |

Goldenacre Sports Ground

=== Round 8 ===
30 September 2022

| Boroughmuir Bears (Scotland) | 16 - 28 | (Scotland) Stirling Wolves |

Meggetland Sports Complex

1 October 2022

| Heriot's Rugby (Scotland) | 7 - 33 | (Scotland) Ayrshire Bulls |

Goldenacre Sports Ground

1 October 2022

| Watsonians (Scotland) | 38 - 14 | (Scotland) Southern Knights |

Myreside Stadium

=== Round 9 ===
7 October 2022

| Ayrshire Bulls (Scotland) | 26 - 0 | (Scotland) Stirling Wolves |

Millbrae

8 October 2022

| Boroughmuir Bears (Scotland) | 10 - 27 | (Scotland) Watsonians |

Meggetland Sports Complex

8 October 2022

| Heriot's Rugby (Scotland) | 20 - 27 | (Scotland) Southern Knights |

Goldenacre Sports Ground

=== Round 10 ===
14 October 2022

| Watsonians (Scotland) | 29 - 21 | (Scotland) Heriot's Rugby |

Myreside Stadium

15 October 2022

| Boroughmuir Bears (Scotland) | 21 - 33 | (Scotland) Ayrshire Bulls |

Meggetland Sports Complex

15 October 2022

| Southern Knights (Scotland) | 19 - 21 | (Scotland) Stirling Wolves |

The Greenyards

== Semi-finals ==
21 October 2022

| Watsonians (Scotland) | 31 - 12 | (Scotland) Heriot's Rugby |

Myreside Stadium

22 October 2022

| Ayrshire Bulls (Scotland) | 17 - 0 | (Scotland) Boroughmuir Bears |

Millbrae

== Super 6 final ==
30 October 2022

| Watsonians (Scotland) | 43 - 24 | (Scotland) Ayrshire Bulls |

Edinburgh Rugby Stadium

== Team of the tournament ==
The 2022–23 Super 6 commentator's team of the tournament was named as follows:-

| Pos | | Player | Team |
|---|---|---|---|
| FB | 15 | (South Africa) Dom Coetzer | Watsonians |
| RW | 14 | (Scotland) Aidan Cross | Southern Knights |
| OC | 13 | (Scotland) Lewis Berg | Watsonians |
| IC | 12 | (Scotland) Robert Beattie | Ayrshire Bulls |
| LW | 11 | (England) Eli Caven | Ayrshire Bulls |
| FH | 10 | (South Africa) Jason Baggott | Watsonians |
| SH | 9 | (Australia) Jordan Lenac | Ayrshire Bulls |
| N8 | 8 | (Scotland) Blair Macpherson | Ayrshire Bulls |
| OF | 7 | (Scotland) Iain Wilson | Heriot's Rugby |
| BF | 6 | (Scotland) Rudi Brown | Southern Knights |
| RL | 5 | (Scotland) Jamie Beresford | Watsonians |
| LL | 4 | (England) Ed Bloodworth | Ayrshire Bulls |
| TP | 3 | (Scotland) Michael Scott | Ayrshire Bulls |
| HK | 2 | (Scotland) Cal Davies | Watsonians |
| LP | 1 | (Scotland) Harrison Courtney | Watsonians |
Substitutes
| HK | 16 | (Scotland) Jerry Blyth-Lafferty | Boroughmuir Bears |
| LP | 17 | (Scotland) Andrew Nimmo | Ayrshire Bulls |
| TP | 18 | (Scotland) Euan McLaren | Heriot's Rugby |
| LK | 19 | (Scotland) Benedict Grant | Stirling Wolves |
| FL | 20 | (Scotland) Kwagga van Niekerk | Watsonians |
| FH | 21 | (Scotland) Andy Stirrat | Ayrshire Bulls |
| FH | 22 | (Scotland) Lomond Macpherson | Watsonians |
| CE | 23 | (Australia) Liam McNamara | Ayrshire Bulls |

== Leading Points scorers ==
The leading points scorers from the League Stage rounds of the competition.

| Player | Points | Team |
|---|---|---|
| (New Zealand) Jack Bergin | 77 | Boroughmuir Bears |
| (Scotland) Will Hunt | 71 | Ayrshire Bulls |
| (Ireland) Bruce Houston | 63 | Heriot's Rugby |
| (Scotland) Lee Millar | 56 | Watsonians |
| (England) Eli Caven | 55 | Ayrshire Bulls |
| (Scotland) Blair Macpherson | 45 | Ayrshire Bulls |
| (South Africa) Jason Baggott | 44 | Watsonians |
| (Cyprus) Marcus Holden | 36 | Stirling Wolves |
