= 2022–23 Scottish Rugby Academy season =

Scottish Rugby Academy 2022 / 2023

The Scottish Rugby Academy provides Scotland's up and coming rugby stars a dedicated focused routeway for development into the professional game. Entry is restricted to Scottish qualified students and both male and female entrants are accepted into 4 regional academies. The 2022–23 season sees the eighth year of the academy, now sponsored by Fosroc.

== Season overview ==
This was the eighth year of the Scottish Rugby Academy.

== Regional Academies ==
The Scottish Rugby Academy runs four regional academies in Scotland:- Glasgow and the West, Borders and East Lothian, Edinburgh and Caledonia. These roughly correspond to the traditional districts of Glasgow District, South, Edinburgh District and North and Midlands.

== Stages ==
Players are selected in three stages:-

=== Supported stages ===
- Stage 1 - Regionally selected and regionally supported players
- Stage 2 - Nationally selected and regionally supported players

=== Contracted stage ===
- Stage 3 - Nationally selected and regionally supported players assigned to a professional team.

== Academy Players ==
=== Stage 3 players ===
Stage 3 players are assigned to a professional team. Nominally, for the men, Glasgow Warriors receive the Stage 3 players of Glasgow and the West and Caledonia regions, while Edinburgh Rugby receive the Stage 3 players of the Edinburgh and Borders and East Lothian regions. The women are integrated into the Scotland women's national rugby sevens team and the Scotland women's national rugby union team.

The Stage 3 players were assigned directly to Glasgow Warriors and Edinburgh Rugby.

However they were also assigned to the Super 6 sides when not in use by the United Rugby Championship sides.

==== Glasgow Warriors ====
Note: Flags indicate national union under World Rugby eligibility rules. Players may hold more than one non-World Rugby nationality.

Player	Position	Union
Tom Banatvala	Prop	Scotland
Callum Norrie	Prop	Scotland
Jamie Drummond	Hooker	Scotland
Harris McLeod	Lock	Scotland
Euan Ferrie	Flanker	Scotland
Rhys Tait	Flanker	Scotland
Archie Smeaton	Number 8	Scotland

Player	Position	Union
Ben Afshar	Scrum-half	Scotland
Finlay Burgess	Scrum-half	Scotland
Christian Townsend	Fly-half	Scotland
Ben Salmon	Centre	Scotland
Duncan Munn	Centre	Scotland
Logan Jarvie	Wing	Scotland
Ross McKnight	Wing	Scotland
Andy Stirrat	Fullback	Scotland

==== Edinburgh ====
Note: Flags indicate national union under World Rugby eligibility rules. Players may hold more than one non-World Rugby nationality.

Player	Position	Union
Robbie Deans	Prop	Scotland
Dan Gamble	Prop	Scotland
Michael Jones	Prop	Scotland
Patrick Harrison	Hooker	Scotland
Jamie Campbell	Flanker	Scotland
Harri Morris	Flanker	Scotland
Rudi Brown	Flanker	Scotland

Player	Position	Union
Matt Russell	Fly-half	Scotland
Cameron Scott	Fly-half	Scotland
Ben Evans	Wing	Scotland
Jacob Henry	Wing	Scotland
Harry Paterson	Fullback	Scotland
Nathan Sweeney	Fullback	Scotland

=== Super 6 intake ===
==== Ayrshire Bulls ====
Note: Flags indicate national union under World Rugby eligibility rules. Players may hold more than one non-World Rugby nationality.

Player	Position	Union
Jamie Drummond	Hooker	Scotland
Archie Smeaton	Number 8	Scotland

Player	Position	Union
Ben Afshar	Scrum-half	Scotland
Christian Townsend	Fly-half	Scotland
Andy Stirrat	Fullback	Scotland

==== Boroughmuir Bears ====
Note: Flags indicate national union under World Rugby eligibility rules. Players may hold more than one non-World Rugby nationality.

Player	Position	Union
Michael Jones	Prop	Scotland
Euan Ferrie	Lock	Scotland
Liam McConnell	Flanker	Scotland
Rhys Tait	Flanker	Scotland

Player	Position	Union
Duncan Munn	Centre	Scotland

==== Heriots Rugby ====
Note: Flags indicate national union under World Rugby eligibility rules. Players may hold more than one non-World Rugby nationality.

Player	Position	Union
Dan Gamble	Prop	Scotland
Jamie Campbell	Flanker	Scotland

Player	Position	Union
Matt Russell	Fly-half	Scotland
Ben Evans	Wing	Scotland
Nathan Sweeney	Fullback	Scotland

==== Southern Knights ====
Note: Flags indicate national union under World Rugby eligibility rules. Players may hold more than one non-World Rugby nationality.

Player	Position	Union
Rudi Brown	Flanker	Scotland
Harri Morris	Flanker	Scotland

Player	Position	Union
Cameron Scott	Fly-half	Scotland
Finn Douglas	Wing	Scotland
Jacob Henry	Wing	Scotland

==== Stirling Wolves ====
Note: Flags indicate national union under World Rugby eligibility rules. Players may hold more than one non-World Rugby nationality.

Player	Position	Union
Callum Norrie	Prop	Scotland
Harris McLeod	Lock	Scotland

Player	Position	Union
Finlay Burgess	Scrum-half	Scotland
Ben Salmon	Centre	Scotland
Logan Jarvie	Wing	Scotland

==== Watsonians ====
Note: Flags indicate national union under World Rugby eligibility rules. Players may hold more than one non-World Rugby nationality.

Player	Position	Union
Tom Banatvala	Prop	Scotland
Robbie Deans	Prop	Scotland
Patrick Harrison	Hooker	Scotland

Player	Position	Union
Ross McKnight	Wing	Scotland
Harry Paterson	Fullback	Scotland

== Graduates of this year ==
Players who have signed professional contracts with clubs:

- (Scotland) Euan Ferrie to (Scotland) Glasgow Warriors
- (Scotland) Patrick Harrison to (Scotland) Edinburgh Rugby
- (Scotland) Jacob Henry to (Scotland) Edinburgh Rugby
- (Scotland) Jamie Campbell to (Scotland) Edinburgh Rugby
- (Scotland) Cameron Scott to (Scotland) Edinburgh Rugby
- (Scotland) Harry Paterson to (Scotland) Edinburgh Rugby
- (Scotland) Michael Jones to (Scotland) Edinburgh Rugby
- (Scotland) Nathan Sweeney to (Scotland) Edinburgh Rugby
- (Scotland) Rhys Tait to (England) Doncaster Knights
- (Scotland) Archie Smeaton to (England) Doncaster Knights
