= Sam Johnson (rugby union) =

Scotland international rugby union & league player

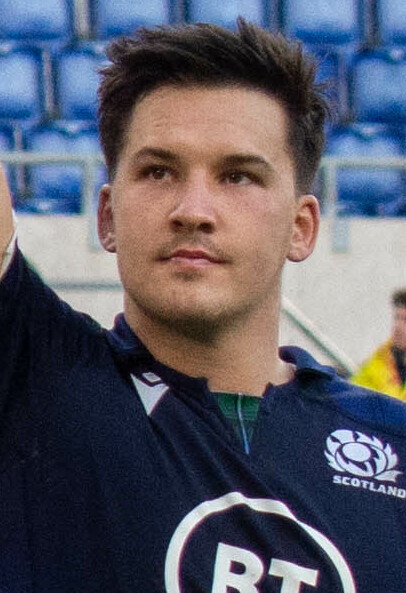
- Johnson in 2020

Personal information
- Born: Sam Johnson; 19 June 1993 (age 33) Dysart, Queensland, Australia
- Height: 1.85 m (6 ft 1 in)
- Weight: 95 kg (209 lb; 14 st 13 lb)

Playing information
- Position: Back Row / Centre
Club
Years	Team	Pld	T	G	FG	P
	Tweed Heads
	Gold Coast Titans U20
	Total	0	0	0	0	0

Rugby union career
- Position: Centre
Amateur team(s)
Years	Team	Apps	(Points)
- GPS
2015–17	Stirling County		
2017–18	Ayr		
2018–19	Glasgow Hawks		
Senior career
Years	Team	Apps	(Points)
2015–23	Glasgow Warriors	104	(50)
2023-	Brive	13	(10)
- Correct as of 11 March 2024
Provincial / State sides
Years	Team	Apps	(Points)
2014–15	Queensland Country	5	
Super Rugby
Years	Team	Apps	(Points)
2013–15	Queensland Reds	2	
International career
Years	Team	Apps	(Points)
2019–22	Scotland	27	(30)
2023	Barbarians	1	(5)

Sam Johnson (born 19 June 1993) is a rugby union player who plays for Brive in France. A centre, Johnson represented Scotland at international level, although born and raised in Australia. He previously played for Glasgow Warriors and is a centurion for the club.

== Rugby union career ==
=== Amateur career ===
Johnson first made a name for himself at schoolboy level, representing Queensland Schoolboys and Australia Schoolboys A after winning the Associated Independent Colleges (AIC) competition with St Edmund's College in 2011. His first rugby union club was GPS in Brisbane. He was then to switch codes to Rugby League.

On moving to Scotland, he played for Stirling County when not in use by Glasgow Warriors.

Johnson was drafted to Ayr in the Scottish Premiership for the 2017-18 season.

Johnson has been drafted to Glasgow Hawks in the Scottish Premiership for the 2018-19 season.

=== Professional career ===
Johnson returned to rugby union for the 2013–14 season, when he joined the Queensland Reds wider training squad, and returned to his former club GPS.

Johnson impressed the Queensland Reds coaching staff in 2014 as a regular in the midfield for Reds A and GPS, which led to him making his Queensland Reds debut off the bench against the Western Force in Perth.

Johnson then went on to play five matches for Queensland Country in Australia's National Rugby Championship in the season 2014–15.

Johnson made two Super Rugby appearances for the Reds in total and was named on the bench a further three times.

On 28 April 2015, it was announced that Johnson would be joining the Pro12 champions Glasgow Warriors in an initial contract to May 2017.

Johnson became Warrior No. 258 on his competitive debut against Ospreys on 1 November 2015. He won Glasgow Warriors Players' Player of the Season, together with Ruaridh Jackson in 2017-18, and was Glasgow's Test Player of the Season in 2018-19. He won Glasgow's try of the season also in the 2018-19 season in Glasgow's crushing of Leinster, away from home at the RDS Arena, by scoring the first Glasgow try in a 39-24 win. He won Player of the Match in October 2021 in a victory over the Sharks at Scotstoun Stadium. He captained Glasgow in their match against Benetton in November 2021. He was Glasgow's Player of the Month for February 2023.

He left Glasgow at the end of the 2022-23 season. He had amassed 104 caps for the Warriors, starting 95 of those matches. He scored 10 tries for the club.

In the summer of 2023, it was announced that he had signed for Brive.

=== International career ===
In October 2018, after qualifying to play for Scotland on residency grounds, he was called up to the senior squad for the Autumn Internationals. He was then named in the squad for the 2019 Six Nations tournament and started in the opening game, a 33–20 win against Italy, to claim his first cap. He scored his first international try in the 13-22 loss to Ireland the next week.

== Rugby league career ==
Johnson played Rugby League for the Gold Coast Titans under-20s after school. His favoured position in rugby league was as a forward in the back row but he was often played at as a back at centre instead and was tagged a utility player. He sometimes played for the Gold Coast Titans' feeder club Tweed Heads Seagulls in New South Wales at this time.
