= Jono Benz-Salomon =

Spanish rugby union player

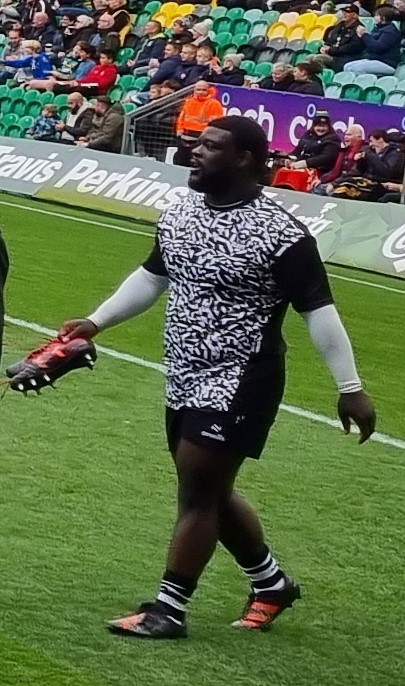
- Jono Benz-Salomon at the Northampton Saints vs Bristol Bears match
- Full name: Jonathan Benz-Salomon
- Born: 17 March 2001 (age 25) Spain
- Height: 176 cm (5 ft 9 in)
- Weight: 113 kg (249 lb; 17 st 11 lb)
- School: Quest Academy
- University: Hartpury University
- Notable relative: Toti Benz-Salomon

Rugby union career
- Position: Tighthead Prop
- Current team: Gloucester
Youth career
- 2013-20??: Harlequins
Senior career
| Years | Team | Apps | (Points) |
| 2021-2024 | Bristol Bears | 13 | (10) |
| 2021- | Hartpury University | 42 | (10) |
| 2024- | Gloucester | 9 | (0) |
- Correct as of 11 October 2023

Jono Benz-Salomon (born 17 March 2001) is a Spanish-French rugby union player who plays for Hartpury University in the Championship. He is dual registered with Gloucester in the Premiership.

== Club career ==
=== Youth ===
He began playing rugby at school, before joining the Harlequins Academy in 2013. He studied at Hartpury University where he also played rugby in the BUCS Super Rugby.

=== Senior career ===
He made his debut for Bristol Bears in the 2021-22 Premiership Rugby Cup, coming off the bench in a 27–33 win over the Exeter Chiefs. In the following season, on 28 September, he and his brother, Toti Benz-Salomon, became the third set of twins to play for Bristol Bears.

He has also featured for Hartpury University RFC, making his first start against London Scottish.

== Personal life ==
He was born in Spain before moving to France at 10 years old. He holds both Spanish and French citizenship. He has a twin brother, Aristot Benz-Salomon, who also is a professional rugby union player.
