= Aristot Benz-Salomon =

Spanish rugby union player

Toti Benz-Salomon
- Full name: Aristot Benz-Salomon
- Born: 17 March 2001 (age 25) Spain
- Height: 174 cm (5 ft 9 in)
- Weight: 111 kg (245 lb; 17 st 7 lb)
- School: Quest Academy
- University: Hartpury University
- Notable relative: Jono Benz-Salomon

Rugby union career
- Position: Loosehead Prop
- Current team: Gloucester, Hartpury University (dual-registration)
Youth career
- 2013-20??: Harlequins
Senior career
Years	Team	Apps	(Points)
2021-2024	Bristol Bears	4	(0)
2021-	Hartpury	46	(40)
2024-	Gloucester (D/R)	5	(0)
- Correct as of 11 March 2025

Aristot Benz-Salomon (born 17 March 2001) is a Spanish rugby union player who plays for Hartpury University in the Championship. He is dual registered with Gloucester in the Premiership.

== Club career ==
=== Youth ===
He began playing rugby at school, before joining the Harlequins Academy in 2013. He studied at Hartpury University where he also played rugby in the BUCS Super Rugby.

=== Senior career ===
He made his debut for Bristol Bears in the 2022-23 Premiership Rugby Cup, starting at loose-head in a 20–35 loss to the Exeter Chiefs. In that match he and his brother, Jono Benz-Salomon, became the third set of twins to play for Bristol Bears.

He has also featured for Hartpury University RFC, making his debut coming off the bench against Doncaster Knights.

== Personal life ==
He was born in Spain before moving to England at 10 years old. He has a twin brother, Jono Benz-Salomon, who also is a professional rugby union player.
