= Tom Ellis (rugby union) =

English rugby union player

- Born: Tom Ellis; 29 September 1994 (age 32) Glastonbury, Somerset, England
- Height: 1.93 m (6 ft 4 in)
- Weight: 113 kg (249 lb; 17 st 11 lb)
- School: Millfield School

Rugby union career
- Position: Flanker/Lock
Senior career
Years	Team	Apps	(Points)
2014–2023	Bath	127	(15)
2014	→ Yorkshire Carnegie	1	(5)
2015	→ Bristol	1	(0)
2023-	Saracens	4	(0)
–	Sale Sharks	7	
- Correct as of 5 April 2023
International career
Years	Team	Apps	(Points)
2013	England U18		
2014	England U20	6	(0)

Tom Ellis (born 29 September 1994 in Parbrook, England) is an English professional rugby union footballer. He played at lock for Bath before moving to flanker, where he usually plays at 6, the blindside flanker.

In May 2017 he was invited to a training camp with the senior England squad by Eddie Jones. In June 2019 he played for England XV against the Barbarians.

In 22/23 season he played for Bath Rugby, Saracens & Sale Sharks in the same season. Also playing in the premiership final for Sale Sharks against Saracens. Making him the first person to win and lose a premiership final on the same day.

He is Head of Rugby at Sutton Valence School, Kent, which is affiliated to the Saracens' academy.
