= Domingo Miotti =

Argentine rugby union player (born 1996)

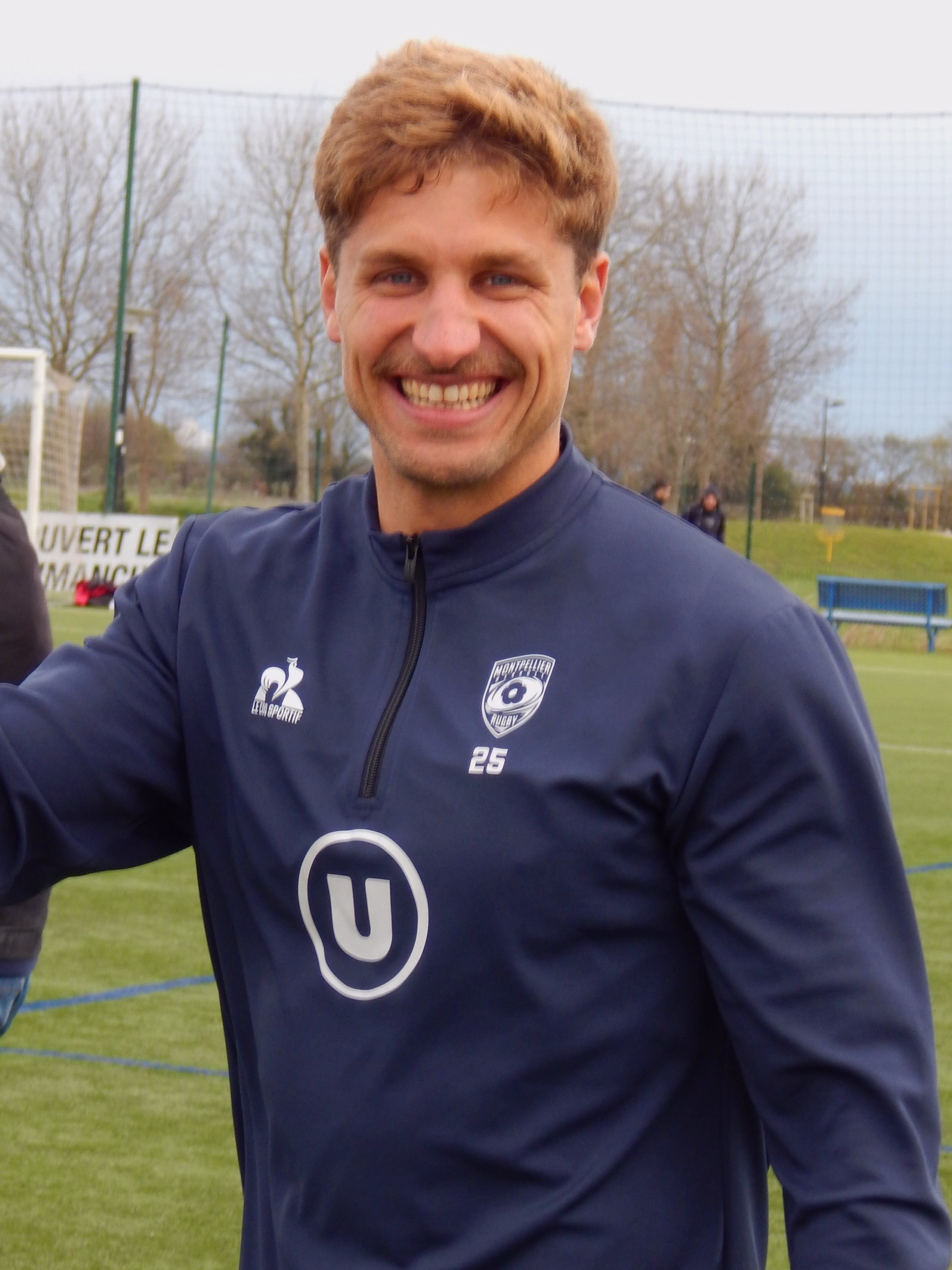
- Born: 22 May 1996 (age 30) San Miguel de Tucumán, Argentina
- Height: 6 ft 2 in (1.88 m)
- Weight: 187 lb (85 kg; 13 st 5 lb)

Rugby union career
- Position: Fly-half
Amateur team(s)
Years	Team	Apps	(Points)
2016–2018	Tucumán Lawn Tennis	8	(61)
Senior career
Years	Team	Apps	(Points)
2019	Jaguares XV	6	(104)
2019–2020	Jaguares	16	(107)
2021	Force	10	(70)
2021–2023	Glasgow Warriors	23	(47)
2023–2024	Oyonnax	22	(168)
2024–	Montpellier	34	(320)
- Correct as of 5 September 2026
International career
Years	Team	Apps	(Points)
- Argentina U20
- Argentina XV
2020–2022	Argentina	10	(13)
National sevens team
Years	Team		Comps
2017–2019	Argentina		

Domingo Miotti (born 22 May 1996) is an Argentine professional rugby union player. His regular playing position is fly-half. He is now with Montpellier, he previously played for Glasgow Warriors and Oyonnax. and

== Career ==
Miotti played for the Jaguares.

Miotti was then signed for Western Force.

On 10 March 2021 it was announced that Miotti had signed for Glasgow Warriors for the 2021–22 season. Miotti said of the move:

I’m very excited to join Glasgow. They are a great club and playing in the Guinness PRO14 will be a new experience for me that I’m really looking forward to. I’ve watched some of Glasgow’s games and they play a fun attacking style of rugby that I’m excited to be a part of.

Miotti made his competitive debut for Glasgow on 4 December 2021 in their match against the Dragons at Scotstoun Stadium on 4 December 2021. He became Glasgow Warrior No. 339.

It was announced on 2 August 2023 that he had signed for Oyonnax.

== International career ==
Miotti has played for Argentina U20, Argentina XV and the Argentina sevens team. Miotti made his international Test debut for Argentina in 2020, replacing fly-half Nicolás Sánchez in the 27th minute of their match against Australia in the 2020 Tri Nations Series. Miotti ultimately played 35 minutes after being briefly subbed off for Sánchez's return.

In July 2026, ahead of Argentina's second Test of the 2026 Nations Championship against Wales, Miotti reportedly turned down an international call-up to the Argentine team as an injury replacement for Santiago Chocobares, whom was unavailable. Head coach Felipe Contepomi said in a press conference that "[Miotti] sees more opportunities to play for Italy. It is a decision that we have accepted. We understand that it wasn't an easy decision to make." Miotti was said to have international eligibility to play for Italy, and since he had not played an international Test match since 2022, had fulfilled World Rugby's mandatory stand-down period to represent another national team.
