= JJ Tonks =

English rugby union player

- Born: Jarett Anthony James Tonks; 25 May 2000 (age 26) Gloucester, England
- Height: 1.93 m (6 ft 4 in)
- Weight: 104 kg (16 st 5 lb)

Rugby union career
- Position: Flanker
- Current team: -
Senior career
Years	Team	Apps	(Points)
2019–2022	Northampton Saints	18	(0)
2022–2024	Bath		
- Correct as of 27 June 2022
- Correct as of 25 March 2021

JJ Tonks (born 25 May 2000) is a former English rugby union player who played for Bath in the Premiership Rugby. He previously played for Northampton Saints.
