= Jamie Campbell (rugby union) =

Scottish rugby player (born 2001)

- Born: 28 May 2001 (age 25) Scotland
- Height: 200 cm (6 ft 7 in)
- Weight: 116 kg (256 lb; 18 st 4 lb)
- School: Kelvinside Academy

Rugby union career
- Position: Lock
- Current team: Edinburgh Rugby
Senior career
Years	Team	Apps	(Points)
2022–	Edinburgh Rugby	1	(0)
- Correct as of 29 May 2024
International career
Years	Team	Apps	(Points)
2020	Scotland U20	5	(0)
- Correct as of 21 December 2023

Jamie Campbell (born 28 May 2001) is a Scottish rugby union player who currently plays for Edinburgh Rugby in the United Rugby Championship.

== Career ==
Campbell was named in the Edinburgh academy for the 2021–22 season. He made his Edinburgh debut on 4 March in the Round 12 match of the 2021–22 United Rugby Championship against Connacht.
