= Cameron Jones (rugby union, born 1999) =

Welsh rugby union player

- Full name: Cameron D. Jones
- Born: 25 September 1999 (age 27) Bridgend, Wales
- Height: 179 cm (5 ft 10 in)
- Weight: 82 kg (181 lb; 12 st 13 lb)

Rugby union career
- Position: Scrum-half
Youth career
- Maesteg Harlequins RFC
Senior career
Years	Team	Apps	(Points)
2022–2023	Glasgow Warriors	0	(0)
2023–2024	Ospreys	3	(5)
2024–2025	Cornish Pirates	16	(15)
- Correct as of 14 December 2025
International career
Years	Team	Apps	(Points)
2019	Scotland U20		
- Correct as of 14 December 2025

Cameron Jones (born 25 September 1999) is a Welsh rugby union player, who most recently played for the Cornish Pirates in the RFU Championship. His preferred position is scrum-half.

== Early career ==
Jones was born in Bridgend and played his junior rugby for Maesteg Harlequins RFC while a member of the Ospreys regional pathway. Jones represented Wales U16. He moved across the border to attend Hartpury College, before making use of his Scottish ancestry to represent Scotland U18 before joining up with the Ayrshire Bulls in the Super6 competition.

== Professional career ==
His performances for Ayrshire earned him a call-up to the Glasgow Warriors squad ahead of the 2022–23 United Rugby Championship season, although he did not make an appearance or ultimately sign with the team. He returned to Wales ahead of the 2024/25 season, signing with the Ospreys. He made his debut for the side in round 3 of the 2022–23 EPCR Challenge Cup against Perpignan. He would make a further two appearances for the side, scoring a try against the Lions, before departing at the end of the season. He then signed for the Cornish Pirates ahead of the 2024–25 RFU Championship. Jones departed the Pirates at the end of the season.
