= Jonny Perriam =

Scottish rugby union referee (born 1994)

- Born: Jonathan Perriam; 1994 (age 31–32) Edinburgh, Scotland
- School: Loretto School
- University: Loughborough University
- Occupation: Rugby Union referee

Rugby union career
Amateur team(s)
| Years | Team | Apps | (Points) |
- Loughborough Students
Senior career
| Years | Team | Apps | (Points) |
| - | Edinburgh | | |
International career
| Years | Team | Apps | (Points) |
| - | Scotland U17 | | |
Coaching career
- Years: Team
- 2011-12: Knox Grammar School
- 2013-15: Leicester Tigers (Strength & Conditioning)
- 2015-16: Northampton Saints (Strength & Conditioning)
Refereeing career
| Years | Competition | | Apps |
| 2017- | Scottish Premiership | | |
| 2019- | Super 6 | | |
| 2023 | Celtic Challenge | | |

Jonny Perriam (born 1994) is a Scottish professional rugby union referee who represents the Scottish Rugby Union.

== Rugby Union career ==
=== Amateur career ===
Having came through Loretto School in Edinburgh, Perriam went to Loughborough University and played for Loughborough Students.

=== Professional career ===
He was an academy player for Edinburgh.

=== International career ===
He played for Scotland U17.

=== Coaching career ===
He first became a rugby and cricket coach at Knox Grammar School in Sydney, Australia from 2011-12.

==== Strength and Conditioning coach ====
Perriam moved into Strength and Conditioning Coaching at Leicester Tigers where he became a Strength and Conditioning Coach intern in 2013 to 2015.

He then moved to become a Strength and Conditioning Coach at Northampton Saints in 2015-16, working with their Elite Player Development Group.

=== Referee career ===
==== Amateur career ====
In 2013 he became a Community Rugby Referee in England, and whilst working for Leicester Tigers and Northampton Saints did this until 2016.

==== Professional career ====
He joined the Scottish Rugby Union's High Performance Panel in 2017.

He has refereed in the Scottish Premiership and Super 6.

He has been Assistant Referee in United Rugby Championship matches.

He has refereed various international Sevens competitions:- Amsterdam Sevens, Dubai Sevens invitational, Hong Kong Sevens AR, Super Series Sevens in the UK, the Algarve Sevens; and also the final of the Hong Kong Tens.

He refereed the inaugural Celtic Challenge match, the Women's Thistles versus Wales Development match in 2023.

Perriam is a member of the Edinburgh Rugby Referees Society.

==== International career ====
Perriam was an Assistant Referee for the Scotland versus Wales women's international match in November 2019.

He was an Assistant Referee for the Rugby Europe Spain versus Romania match in February 2022.

== Business career ==
He was a Commercial Executive at Edinburgh from 2019 to 2021.

He joined Grant Thorton as a Regions Growth Executive from 2021 to 2022.
