= Andrew Kitchener =

English rugby union player (born 1996)

- Born: Andrew Mark Kitchener; 15 July 1996 (age 30) Shrewsbury, England
- Height: 2.01 m (6 ft 7 in)
- Weight: 113 kg (17 st 11 lb)
- University: University of Birmingham
- Notable relative: Graham Kitchener (brother)

Rugby union career
- Position: Lock
Amateur team(s)
Years	Team	Apps	(Points)
- Shrewsbury
–	Wolverhampton		
Senior career
Years	Team	Apps	(Points)
2014–2022	Worcester Warriors	86	(0)
2015	→ Nottingham (loan)	1	(0)
2016–2017	Birmingham Moseley (dual-reg)		
2022–	Saracens	0	(0)
- Correct as of 7 October 2022
International career
Years	Team	Apps	(Points)
2016	England U20	7	(0)
- Correct as of 30 June 2016

Andrew Kitchener (born 15 July 1996) is an English rugby union player.

Andrew Kitchener joined the Worcester Warriors academy in 2014 and is the younger brother of Warriors lock Graham Kitchener. Kitchener made his first team debut in Moscow, Russia against Enisei-STM in the European Rugby Challenge Cup in November 2016. He continued to impress when handed the opportunity and went on to make more appearances across the 2016-17 campaign, as he featured in every European Challenge Cup fixture, while also making his Premiership debut against Northampton Saints in November 2016. He also gained senior experience with Birmingham Moseley in the National League 1 for the 2017–18 season.

Kitchener was called into England U20s for the 2016 Six Nations Under 20s Championship. He also helped them to win the 2016 World Rugby Under 20 Championship alongside Warriors team-mate Jack Singleton.

On 8 May 2019, Kitchener signed his first professional contract with Worcester at Sixways Stadium, thus promoted to the senior squad from the 2019–20 season. He played against his brother, Graham, for the first and only time when Warriors won at Welford Road against Leicester Tigers in the Premiership Rugby Cup in November 2018.

Kitchener graduated from the University of Birmingham with a first-class degree in Economics in the summer of 2019. On 28 November 2019, he signed a two-year contract extension with the club.

On 5 October 2022 all Worcester players had their contacts terminated due to the liquidation of the company to which they were contracted.
