= Sione Vailanu =

Tongan rugby union player

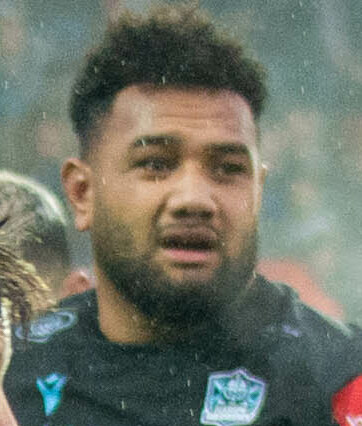
- Vailanu in 2022
- Full name: Sione Langi Vailanu
- Born: 27 January 1995 (age 31) Nukualofa, Tonga
- Height: 1.85 m (6 ft 1 in)
- Weight: 127 kg (280 lb; 20 st 0 lb)
- University: Asahi University
- Notable relative: Mahe Vailanu (brother)

Rugby union career
- Position(s): Number 8, Flanker
- Current team: Glasgow Warriors
Senior career
Years	Team	Apps	(Points)
2018–2019	Saracens	10	(20)
2019–2021	Wasps	31	(25)
2021–2022	Worcester Warriors	21	(15)
2022–	Glasgow Warriors	20	(30)
- Correct as of 28 August 2023
International career
Years	Team	Apps	(Points)
2015	Tonga U20	4	(15)
2017–	Tonga	12	(20)
- Correct as of 28 August 2023

Sione Langi Vailanu (born 27 January 1995) is a Tongan professional rugby union player who plays as a number eight for United Rugby Championship club Glasgow Warriors and the Tonga national team.

== Club career ==
Sione's early career consisted of 4 years of playing rugby sevens in Japan with the Asahi University. While he was playing in Japan he was scouted by Afa Hanipale who recommended him to invitational team Samurai RFC. Sione was invited to play for Samurai RFC at the Hong Kong 10s tournament in 2017

It was at the Hong Kong 10s, playing for Samurai RFC, that he impressed the then Saracens Academy Director Donald Barrell. Barrell was with Samurai RFC as their forwards coach and following a successful tournament approached Sione with a view to moving to Saracens.

It was his performance here that led to joining the Tongan national team "Ikale Tahi" for two games, against Japan and Romania, with a defeat and victory respectively. Along with several other members of the Tongan team, he chose to depart from national duty early in order to ease the mid-season joining in England.

Sione joined Saracens at the beginning of January 2018 to act both as injury and international call-up cover, with an initial contract to the end of the 2018/19 season. Several injuries, including to his hand, would limit him to four games across all Saracens' competitions in the remainder of the 2017/18 season.

In February 2019, Sione announced his signing by Wasps, in order to receive more game time and to partially fill the position vacated by Nathan Hughes who departed at the conclusion of the 2018/19 season.

In April 2021, Worcester Warriors announced that Vailanu would be joining them at Sixways Stadium on a two-year contract.
