= Cameron Neild =

English rugby union footballer

- Born: Cameron Neild; 6 September 1994 (age 32) Manchester, England
- Height: 185 cm (6 ft 1 in)
- Weight: 108 kg (17 st 0 lb)
- School: Manchester Grammar School
- Notable relative: Solomon Neild (Brother) Spider Harris
- Occupation: Professional rugby player

Rugby union career
- Position: Flanker
Senior career
Years	Team	Apps	(Points)
2013–2022	Sale Sharks	130	(25)
2014	→ Macclesfield (loan)	4	(15)
2022	Worcester Warriors	3	(0)
2022-2023	Glasgow Warriors	5	(0)
2023	Edinburgh	1	(0)
2024-	Newcastle Falcons	0	(0)
International career
Years	Team	Apps	(Points)
- England U16
- England U18
2014	England U20	1	(0)

Cameron Neild (born 6 September 1996 in Manchester, England) is a rugby union player. He plays as a flanker. He plays for Newcastle Falcons having played for Glasgow Warriors, Edinburgh Rugby, Sale Sharks and Worcester Warriors.

== Rugby Union career ==
=== Professional career ===
He was the England Under-16 Player of the Year in 2011, while in the Sale Sharks academy.

He joined Worcester Warriors for the start of the 2022-23 season. However, when that club folded, Neild joined Glasgow Warriors on 15 November 2022.

He made his competitive debut for Glasgow Warriors against Bath Rugby in the European Challenge Cup in a 22 - 19 win for the Glasgow side on 10 December 2022. He became Glasgow Warrior No. 348. Making 5 appearances for the club, he was released in the summer of 2023.

=== International career ===
Neild has represented England at under-16, under-18 and under-20 level.
