= The Quest Academy, Croydon =

The Quest Academy

Location
- Farnborough Avenue; South Croydon, Greater London, CR2 8HD; England
- Coordinates: 51.35105°N 0.04987°W

Information
- Type: Academy
- Department for Education URN: 136203 Tables
- Ofsted: Reports
- Principal: Andy Crofts
- Gender: Coeducational
- Age: 11 to 18
- Website: www.thequestacademy.org.uk

The Quest Academy (formerly known as Selsdon High School and Monks Hill Comprehensive School) is a coeducational secondary school and sixth form with academy status in South Croydon in the London Borough of Croydon, England.

The school converted to academy status in September 2010 in partnership with Coloma Convent Girls' School. Previously it was a community school under the control of Croydon London Borough Council, and it continues to coordinate with the council on admissions.

The academy offers GCSEs and OCR Nationals, and sixth-form students can choose a range of A Levels.

Roy Hodgson, ex-manager of the England national football team, was a teacher at Monks Hill Comprehensive in the 1970s.

== Notable former pupils ==
=== Selsdon High School ===
- Wilfried Zaha, footballer

=== Monks Hill High School ===
- Kirsty MacColl, English singer-songwriter
