= Eli Caven =

English rugby union player

- Born: Elias Caven; 11 November 1996 (age 30) Bristol, England
- Height: 172 cm (5 ft 8 in)
- Weight: 76 kg (168 lb; 12 st 0 lb)
- University: Hartpury College

Rugby union career
Amateur team(s)
Years	Team	Apps	(Points)
2015-16	Clifton		
2016	Sumner		
Senior career
Years	Team	Apps	(Points)
2015-17	Bristol Bears	17	(20)
2017-18	Gloucester	9	(5)
2018-20	Hartpury University	32	(117)
2022–23	Glasgow Warriors	1	(5)
2023-	Cambridge		
Super Rugby
Years	Team	Apps	(Points)
2020-23	Ayrshire Bulls	41	(113)
Coaching career
- Years: Team
- 2020-23: Ayrshire Bulls (Strength and Conditioning)

Eli Caven (born 11 November 1996) is an English rugby union player, now playing with Cambridge. He previously played for Glasgow Warriors in the United Rugby Championship, and Ayrshire Bulls in the Super 6. He plays on the wing.

== Rugby Union career ==
=== Amateur career ===
While in the Bristol Bears academy he was dual-registered with Clifton, and played mainly for the amateur club.

He was offered the chance to go to New Zealand in the summer of 2016, when he played for Sumner in the Canterbury area.

=== Professional career ===
He joined the Bristol Bears academy in 2016. He played for Bristol in the Premiership Sevens.

He played for Hartpury University while getting his degree in Strength and Conditioning, first of all on a loan deal, then from 2017 in the English Championship.

In 2020, he signed for Ayrshire Bulls in the Super 6.

He was training with Glasgow Warriors in 2022. Head Coach Franco Smith said: "We brought Eli in after the end of the Super6 Championship in late October and he’s trained really well with us. He played for our A team in a training match against Scotland under-20s last month, scoring three tries, and it’s an area of the team that we want to broaden the number of players available to us."

He made his competitive debut for Glasgow Warriors on 25 February 2023, in the match against the Lions in the United Rugby Championship, scoring a try in the match. Caven earned the Glasgow Warrior No. 351.

He moved to play for Cambridge for the 2023-24 season.

=== Coaching career ===
He has a Bachelor of Science in Strength and Conditioning. He is also a BWL Olympic Weightlifting Coach. He was a Strength and Conditioning Coach for Ayrshire Bulls till moving in 2023.
