= Rhys Tait =

Scottish rugby union player

- Born: 2 July 2002 (age 24) Hawick, Scotland
- Height: 1.86 m (6 ft 1 in)
- Weight: 103 kg (16 st 3 lb)
- School: Sedbergh School

Rugby union career
- Position: Flanker
Amateur team(s)
Years	Team	Apps	(Points)
- Jed-Forest RFC
–	Hawick RFC		
Senior career
Years	Team	Apps	(Points)
2019	Newcastle Falcons		
2021 - 23	Glasgow Warriors		
2023	→ Doncaster Knights		
2023 - 26	Doncaster Knights		
Super Rugby
Years	Team	Apps	(Points)
2020 - 22	Boroughmuir Bears		
2022 - 23	Southern Knights		
International career
Years	Team	Apps	(Points)
- Scotland U16
- Scotland U18
- Scotland U20
2024	Emerging Scotland	1	(0)

Rhys Tait (born 2 July 2002 in Hawick, Scotland) is an Emerging Scotland international rugby union player who plays for Doncaster Knights at the Flanker position. He previously played for Boroughmuir Bears and Southern Knights in the Super Series.

== Rugby Union career ==
=== Amateur career ===
He started playing rugby union at the age of 5 playing for JedForest minis.

He played rugby union for Sedbergh School.

He played for Hawick.

=== Professional career ===
He played for the Newcastle Falcons Under 18 side.

In the Super 6 league he played for Boroughmuir Bears and Southern Knights.

He then joined the Glasgow Warriors as part of their academy in 2021.

In 2023 he was loaned out to Doncaster Knights in the RFU Championship. He was signed permanently by the Knights from the 2023 season.

It was announced on 1 June 2026 that Tait would be joining Coventry rugby club for 2026-27 season.

=== International career ===
He was capped for Scotland U16 and Scotland U18.

He played for Scotland U20s. He was named the U20 captain by Head Coach Kenny Murray.

On 14 December 2024 he played for the first international match for the Emerging Scotland side.
