= JP du Preez =

South African rugby union player

- Full name: Jean-Pierre du Preez
- Born: 9 November 1994 (age 32) Florida, Roodepoort, South Africa
- Height: 2.10 m (6 ft 10 1/2 in)
- Weight: 122 kg (19 st 3 lb; 269 lb)
- School: Hoërskool Dr. E.G. Jansen, Boksburg

Rugby union career
- Position: Lock
- Current team: Lions
Youth career
- 2012: Falcons
- 2013–15: Golden Lions
Senior career
Years	Team	Apps	(Points)
2015	Lions	1	(0)
2015–17	Golden Lions XV	13	(15)
2016	Golden Lions	4	(5)
2018	Free State XV	5	(5)
2018–20	Free State Cheetahs	8	(0)
2018–20	Cheetahs	23	(0)
2020–22	Sale Sharks	34	(10)
2022–25	Glasgow Warriors	26	(5)
2025–2026	Red Hurricanes Osaka	3	(0)
2026–	Lions	1	(0)
- Correct as of 26 October 2026

Jean-Pierre du Preez (born 9 November 1994 in Florida, South Africa) is a South African rugby union player for Lions. His regular position is lock. He previously played for Glasgow Warriors, Cheetahs and Sale Sharks.

== Career ==
=== Youth ===
Du Preez represented the Falcons at the 2012 Under-18 Craven Week tournament in Port Elizabeth, scoring a try in their match against the Leopards. Despite still being at school, he was also included in the Falcons U19 squad that played in the 2012 Under-19 Provincial Championship a few months later, starting six of their matches as they reached the semi-finals of the competition.

In 2013, Du Preez made the short move to the Johannesburg-based Golden Lions. He was once again heavily involved at the Under-19 level, starting eleven matches for the Golden Lions U19s in the 2013 Under-19 Provincial Championship, helping them reach the final of the competition, where they lost 23–35 to Blue Bulls U19. In addition, he also made two appearances for the Golden Lions U21 side in the 2013 Under-21 Provincial Championship.

Du Preez was included in the Golden Lions' squad for the 2014 Vodacom Cup, but failed to appear in the competition. He made nine appearances for the Golden Lions U21 during the round-robin stage of the 2014 Under-21 Provincial Championship, scoring a try in their match against Leopards U21. He missed the final regular season matches of the season when he picked up a four-week suspension following a dangerous tackle on Sharks U21 scrum-half Stefan Ungerer, but returned to the line-up for their semi-final clash with the Blue Bulls U21. He scored an early try for the Lions in the match, but it wasn't enough to prevent the Lions falling to a 19–23 defeat and being eliminated from the competition.

=== Golden Lions / Lions ===
In 2015, he was included in the Lions squad for the 2015 Super Rugby season and was named on the bench for their Round Two match against the Sharks. He made his Super Rugby debut, coming on as a substitute just after the hour mark.

=== Sale Sharks ===
Following two years with Cheetahs. It was confirmed in November 2020 that du Preez had signed for Premiership Rugby team Sale Sharks on a two-year contract.

=== Glasgow Warriors ===
Du Preez signed for Glasgow Warriors on 2 December 2021 for the 2022–23 season. He made his debut in the pre-season friendly against Ayrshire Bulls. He then made his competitive debut on 23 September 2022 against Cardiff Rugby at Scotstoun Stadium, becoming Glasgow Warrior No. 344 when he came on at lock in the second half. Glasgow put 8 tries past the Welsh side, winning 52–24.
