= Archie Smeaton =

English rugby union player (born 2001)

- Born: 7 March 2001 Cottingham, England
- Height: 1.90 m (6 ft 3 in)
- Weight: 105 kg (16 st 7 lb)
- School: Hymers College, Hull
- University: Queens' College, Cambridge

Rugby union career
- Position: No. 8 / Flanker
Amateur team(s)
Years	Team	Apps	(Points)
-	Hull Ionians		
-	Yorkshire Carnegie		
2020	Cambridge University		
Senior career
Years	Team	Apps	(Points)
2022–23	Glasgow Warriors	0	(0)
2023-	Doncaster Knights	39	(20)
Super Rugby
Years	Team	Apps	(Points)
2021–22	Ayrshire Bulls		
International career
Years	Team	Apps	(Points)
- Scotland U16
2018	Scotland U18		
- England U18
2020-21	Scotland U20	3	(0)

Archie Smeaton (born 7 March 2001) is a Scottish rugby union player who plays for Doncaster Knights. He previously played for Ayrshire Bulls and Glasgow Warriors.

== Rugby Union career ==
=== Amateur career ===
He played youth rugby for Hull Ionians. He joined the Scottish Exiles program. He then went to Hymers College and played for their college team. He then joined Yorkshire Carnegie's academy.

He went to Queens College, Cambridge and played for Cambridge University, being selected for the match against Oxford University.

=== Professional career ===
He played for Ayrshire Bulls for the season 2021-22. After good performances with the Ayrshire club in the Super 6 league he was voted in the Super 6 fans combined team of the season, with a slot on the bench.

He joined the Glasgow Warriors academy in 2022. He played for Glasgow Warriors 'A' against his old club Ayrshire Bulls on 7 April 2023, with the Warriors losing that match. The Warriors 'A' side with Smeaton got a better result against Boroughmuir Bears on 15 April 2023. Smeaton and the Warriors 'A' side narrowly lost to Stirling Wolves on 21 April 2023.

He moved to Doncaster Knights in the summer of 2023. He was voted fans player of the season for 2023-24, his first season with the club.

=== International career ===
Smeaton is English-qualified by birth and Scottish-qualified through his grandfather. He played for Scotland U16s in a tournament in Wales.

He was capped by both Scotland and England Under 18s sides. Smeaton was in the Yorkshire Carnegie academy when being picked for England. He said of the move: "It was a hard one for me because I had loved playing for Scotland, but if you are a member of an English club’s Academy it is expected that you will play for England." However he moved back into the Scottish pathway soon after this.

He played 3 matches for Scotland U20s in their Six Nations campaign in season 2020-21.
