= List of 2023–24 RFU Championship transfers =

This is a list of player transfers involving RFU Championship teams before or during the 2023–24 season. The list is of deals that are confirmed and are either from or to a rugby union team in the Championship during the 2023–24 season. It is not unknown for confirmed deals to be cancelled at a later date.

No clubs were promoted to the Gallagher Premiership for the 2023–24 season. On 1 May 2023, Cambridge were promoted to the RFU Championship, whilst Richmond were relegated to National League 1 for the 2023–24 season.

Transfers involving Jersey Reds, which finished the 2022–23 season, are documented on this list – however, the club will not compete in 2023–24, after withdrawing from the league on 28 September 2023, prior to the beginning of the season, due to insufficient funds to continue operating.

== Ampthill ==
=== Players In ===
- (Samoa) Sam Asotasi from (England) Saracens (season-long loan)
- (England) Ben Chapman from (Wales) Cardiff Metropolitan University
- (Wales) Griff Evans from (Wales) Scarlets
- (England) James Flynn from (England) Saracens
- (Samoa) James Johnston from (France) Stade Niçois
- (England) Jasper McGuire from (England) Newcastle University
- (Wales) Iestyn Rees from (Wales) Scarlets
- (England) Josh Smart from (England) London Irish
- (Wales) Luke Yendle from (Wales) Dragons (season-long loan)
- (England) Ewan Greenlaw from (England) Newcastle Falcons
- (Ireland) Oli Morris from (Ireland) Munster
- (England) Jack Spittle from (England) Doncaster Knights
- (England) Fraser Stratchan from (England) Doncaster Knights
- (Wales) Harri Williams from (Wales) Scarlets
- (Ireland) Josh Dunne from (Ireland) Connacht
- (England) Luke Green from (England) London Irish
- (England) Joe Green from (Australia) Southern Districts
- (England) Alex Harmes from (England) London Irish
- (England) Izaiha Moore-Aiono from (England) Northampton Saints
- (Wales) Joe Peard from Jersey Reds
- (England) Josh Barton from Jersey Reds

=== Players Out ===
- (United States) Paddy Ryan to (England) Coventry
- (Wales) Ben Cambriani to (Italy) Zebre Parma
- (England) Matt Gallagher to (England) Caldy
- (England) Joe Sproston to (England) Caldy
- (England) Harry Wilson to (England) Doncaster Knights
- (England) Fyn Brown to (England) Doncaster Knights
- (England) Jake Ellwood to (England) Cambridge
- (England) Sam Hanks to (England) Cambridge
- (England) Tom Hardwick released
- (England) Charlie Hudson released
- (England) Tom Hudson released
- (Ireland) Griff Phillipson released
- (England) Harry Wilson released
- (England) George Worth to (France) Valence Romans
- (Ireland) Lewis Finlay to (Ireland) City of Armagh
- (Ireland) Conor Rankin to (Ireland) Ballynahinch
- (England) Charlie Beckett to (England) Doncaster Knights

== Bedford Blues ==
=== Players In ===
- (England) Cameron King from (England) London Scottish
- (England) James Fish from (England) Northampton Saints
- (England) Jamie Jack from (Scotland) Edinburgh
- (Ireland) Oisín Heffernan from (England) Northampton Saints
- (South Africa) Jordan Venter from (England) Bath
- (Ireland) Bryan O'Connor from (England) Gloucester
- (England) Ethan Grayson from (England) Northampton Saints (short-term deal)
- (England) Joe Howard from (England) Hartpury University

=== Players Out ===
- (England) Lewis Holsey released
- (England) Monty Royston released
- (England) Charles Ryland released
- (Fiji) Tui Uru to (France) Chambéry
- (England) Corrie Barrett to (England) Doncaster Knights

== Caldy ==
=== Players In ===
- (Scotland) Callum Atkinson from (England) Leeds Tykes
- (England) Luke Cox from (England) Chester
- (England) Matt Gallagher from (England) Ampthill
- (Wales) Sam Rogers from (Wales) RGC 1404
- (England) Joe Sproston from (England) Ampthill

== Cambridge ==
=== Players In ===
- (England) Jake Ellwood from (England) Ampthill
- (Wales) Morgan Veness from (England) Ealing Trailfinders
- (England) Jared Cardew from (England) Doncaster Knights
- (Wales) Benji Hoppe from (Wales) Cardiff Metropolitan University
- (Scotland) Jed Gelderbloom from (New Zealand) Linwood
- (England) Sam Hanks from (England) Ampthill
- (England) Eli Caven from (Scotland) Ayrshire Bulls
- (England) Logan Noble from (England) Newcastle Falcons
- (Wales) Huw Owens from Jersey Reds

=== Players Out ===
- (England) Dan Brough to (England) Birmingham Moseley

== Cornish Pirates ==
=== Players In ===
- (England) Harry Dugmore from (England) Ealing Trailfinders (season-long loan)
- (England) Tom Georgiou from (England) Ealing Trailfinders (season-long loan)
- (England) Eparama Rokodrava from (England) Ealing Trailfinders (season-long loan)
- (South Africa) Lefty Zigiriadis from (England) Ealing Trailfinders (season-long loan)
- (England) Tom Pittman from Jersey Reds
- (England) Kyle Moyle from (England) Gloucester
- (Zimbabwe) Matthew McNab from (England) Hartpury University
- (Wales) Ioan Evans from (Wales) Cardiff
- (England) Jordan Gott from (England) Royal Navy
- (Wales) Rhys Williams from (England) Royal Navy
- (Scotland) Josh King from (Scotland) Boroughmuir
- (Wales) Oli Burrows from (England) Exeter Chiefs (season-long loan)
- (Australia) Hugh Bokenham from (Australia) Sydney University
- (Ireland) Bruce Houston from (Scotland) Edinburgh

=== Players Out ===
- (England) Tom Kessell released
- (England) Hayden King released
- (England) Josh Williams released
- (New Zealand) Shae Tucker to (England) Blackheath
- (Wales) Garyn Smith to (Wales) Pontypridd
- (England) AJ Cant to (England) Doncaster Knights
- (England) Seb Nagle-Taylor to (England) Doncaster Knights
- (England) Robin Wedlake to Jersey Reds
- (England) Jarrad Hayler to (England) Hartpury University
- (Wales) Arwel Robson to (Wales) Cardiff
- (England) Harry Bazalgette to (England) Hartpury University
- (Ireland) Rory Parata to (Ireland) Lansdowne
- (Wales) Carwyn Penny to (Wales) Newport

== Coventry ==
=== Players In ===
- (England) Eliot Salt from (Wales) Cardiff Metropolitan University
- (United States) Paddy Ryan from (England) Ampthill
- (England) Ryan Hutler from Jersey Reds
- (England) Jack Bartlett from (England) Gloucester
- (England) Matt Kvesic from (Italy) Zebre Parma
- (England) Obinna Nkwocha from (England) Saracens
- (Wales) Rhys Anstey from (England) Ealing Trailfinders (season-long loan)
- (England) Elliot Chilvers from (England) Ealing Trailfinders (season-long loan)
- (England) Chester Owen from (England) Leicester Tigers
- (Scotland) Adam Nicol from Jersey Reds
- (Fiji) Vilikesa Nairau unattached

=== Players Out ===
- (England) Adam Peters released
- (Wales) Rhys Thomas released
- (England) Josh Bainbridge to (England) Newcastle Falcons
- (England) Louis Brown to (England) Newcastle Falcons
- (Scotland) Tom Dodd to (Scotland) Edinburgh
- (Wales) Will Talbot-Davies to (England) London Scottish
- (England) Jake Bridges to (England) Nottingham
- (England) Joe Snow to (England) Exeter Chiefs
- (England) Will Rigg to (England) Exeter Chiefs

== Doncaster Knights ==
=== Players In ===
- (England) Corrie Barrett from (England) Bedford Blues
- (Scotland) Rhys Tait from (Scotland) Glasgow Warriors
- (Scotland) Archie Smeaton from (Scotland) Glasgow Warriors
- (Scotland) Harri Morris from (Scotland) Edinburgh (season-long loan)
- (England) Harry Wilson from (England) Ampthill
- (England) AJ Cant from (England) Cornish Pirates
- (England) Fyn Brown from (England) Ampthill
- (Australia) Jack Digby from (England) Ealing Trailfinders
- (England) Seb Nagle-Taylor from (England) Cornish Pirates
- (New Zealand) Harrison Courtney from (Scotland) Edinburgh
- (England) Lewis Thiede from (England) Ealing Trailfinders
- (England) Ollie Fox from (England) Ealing Trailfinders
- (England) Tom Doughty from (England) Bath
- (England) Joe Bedlow from (England) Sale Sharks (season-long loan)
- (England) Charlie Beckett from (England) Ampthill
- (Fiji) Vereimi Qorowale from (England) Newcastle Falcons (season-long loan)

=== Players Out ===
- (England) George Edgson released
- (England) Will Holling released
- (England) Sam Hudson released
- (England) Jake Pope released
- (Chile) Martin Sigren released
- (Australia) James Wayland released
- (England) John Kelly to (England) Newcastle Falcons
- (Scotland) Bobby Bratton to (Scotland) Watsonians
- (England) Thom Smith to Jersey Reds
- (England) Jared Cardew to (England) Cambridge
- (England) Joe Green to (Australia) Southern Districts
- (England) Jake Armstrong to (England) Wharfedale
- (Scotland) Sam Daly to (England) Plymouth Albion
- (England) Alex Lloyd-Seed to (England) London Scottish
- (England) Kai Owen to (England) Nottingham
- (England) Will Yarnell to (England) Nottingham
- (England) Robbie Smith to (England) Hartpury University
- (England) Jack Spittle to (England) Ampthill
- (England) Fraser Stratchan to (England) Ampthill
- (England) Theo Vukašinović to (England) Northampton Saints

== Ealing Trailfinders ==
=== Players In ===
- (England) Billy Twelvetrees from (England) Gloucester
- (Australia) Jordy Reid from (England) Gloucester
- (Wales) Lloyd Williams from (Wales) Cardiff
- (Wales) Brad Thyer from (Wales) Cardiff
- (France) Sami Mavinga from (France) Carcassonne
- (England) Henry Walker from (England) Gloucester
- (South Africa) Mike Willemse from (England) London Irish
- (England) Biyi Alo from (France) Racing 92
- (England) Matt Cornish from (England) London Irish
- (England) Tom Hitchcock from (England) London Irish
- (England) Tom Collins from (England) Northampton Saints
- (England) Will Goodrick-Clarke from (England) London Irish
- (Namibia) Richard Hardwick from (Australia) Melbourne Rebels

=== Players Out ===
- (Australia) Adam Korczyk released
- (South Africa) Shaun Malton released
- (England) Max Northcote-Green released
- (Ireland) Peter Robb released
- (Scotland) Alun Walker to (England) Chinnor
- (England) Harry Dugmore to (England) Cornish Pirates (season-long loan)
- (England) Tom Georgiou to (England) Cornish Pirates (season-long loan)
- (England) Eparama Rokodrava to (England) Cornish Pirates (season-long loan)
- (South Africa) Lefty Zigiriadis to (England) Cornish Pirates (season-long loan)
- (Australia) Jack Digby to (England) Doncaster Knights
- (Wales) Rhys Anstey to (England) Coventry (season-long loan)
- (England) Elliot Chilvers to (England) Coventry (season-long loan)
- (England) Lewis Thiede to (England) Doncaster Knights
- (England) Ollie Fox to (England) Doncaster Knights
- (Wales) Morgan Veness to (England) Cambridge
- (Australia) Jack Grant to (Australia) NSW Waratahs

== Hartpury University ==
=== Players In ===
- (Scotland) Nathan Chamberlain from (England) London Scottish
- (Scotland) Mitch Eadie from (Scotland) Edinburgh
- (England) Jarrad Hayler from (England) Cornish Pirates
- (Wales) Alex Morgan from (England) Gloucester
- (Wales) Joe Rees from (England) London Scottish
- (England) Robbie Smith from (England) Doncaster Knights
- (England) Joe Randall from (Wales) Cardiff Metropolitan University
- (England) Josh Gray from (England) Gloucester
- (England) Harry Bazalgette from (England) Cornish Pirates

=== Players Out ===
- (England) Archie English to (England) Blackheath
- (Zimbabwe) Matthew McNab to (England) Cornish Pirates
- (England) Joe Howard to (England) Bedford Blues
- (Hungary) Stan Norman to (England) Cinderford
- (England) Joe Winfield to (England) Cinderford
- (England) Will Crane to (England) Gloucester (short-term loan)
- (England) Harry Tarling to (England) Dings Crusaders RFC

== Jersey Reds ==
=== Players In ===
- (Ireland) Ciaran Booth from (Ireland) Connacht
- (England) John Hawkins from (England) Bristol Bears
- (Wales) Dafydd Hughes from (Wales) Scarlets
- (Wales) Joe Peard from (Wales) Cardiff
- (Ireland) Peter Sullivan from (Ireland) Connacht
- (England) Thom Smith from (England) Doncaster Knights
- (England) Robin Wedlake from (England) Cornish Pirates

=== Players Out ===
- (Wales) Tomi Lewis to (Wales) Scarlets
- (England) Ryan Hutler to (England) Coventry
- (South Africa) Brendan Cope retired
- (Scotland) Hamish Bain to (France) Vannes
- (Wales) Macauley Cook to (Wales) Pontypridd
- (England) Tom Pittman to (England) Cornish Pirates
- (England) Will Brown to (England) London Scottish
- (England) Jonny Law to (England) London Scottish
- (Wales) Luke Davies to (Wales) Ospreys
- (England) Antonio Harris to (England) Nottingham
- (England) Tom Everard to (England) Blackheath
- (England) John Hawkins to (England) Newcastle Falcons
- (Australia) Ben Woollett to (England) Leicester Tigers
- (England) Dan Barnes to Guernsey Raiders
- (England) James Hadfield to (England) Saracens
- (Ireland) Greg McGrath to (Ireland) Ulster
- (Scotland) Steven Longwell to (Italy) Zebre Parma
- (England) James Elliott to (England) Newcastle Falcons
- (Scotland) Sam Grahamslaw to (England) Bristol Bears
- (Scotland) Adam Nicol to (England) Coventry
- (Ireland) Alex McHenry to (France) Dax
- (Wales) Dafydd Hughes to (Wales) Cardiff
- (England) Hallam Chapman to (England) Exeter Chiefs
- (South Africa) Brendan Owen to (England) Bath
- (Wales) Joe Peard to (England) Ampthill
- (England) Josh Barton to (England) Ampthill
- (Wales) Huw Owens to (England) Cambridge
- (Wales) Alun Lawrence to (Wales) Cardiff
- (South Africa) Jordan Holgate to (England) Newcastle Falcons

== London Scottish ==
=== Players In ===
- (England) Rhys Charalambous from (England) Bristol Bears
- (Wales) Will Talbot-Davies from (England) Coventry
- (England) Will Brown from Jersey Reds
- (Wales) Elliot Haydon from (Wales) Cardiff Metropolitan University
- (England) Jonny Law from Jersey Reds
- (Ireland) Stephen Kerins from (England) Richmond
- (England) George Cave from (England) Richmond
- (Netherlands) Marijn Huis unattached
- (South Africa) Graham Geldenhuys from (England) Richmond
- (England) Toby Tyson from (England) Leeds Beckett University
- (England) Lewis Barrett from (England) Nottingham
- (England) Ashley Challenger from (France) C' Chartres
- (Wales) Ioan Rhys Davies from (France) Graulhet
- (Wales) Garin Lloyd from (Wales) Swansea
- (England) Alec Lloyd-Seed from (England) Doncaster Knights

=== Players Out ===
- (England) Cameron King to (England) Bedford Blues
- (England) Ben Churnock to (England) Blackheath
- (England) Theo Manihera to (England) Rosslyn Park
- (England) Maurice Nwakor to (England) Rosslyn Park
- (Scotland) Nathan Chamberlain to (England) Hartpury University
- (Wales) Joe Rees to (England) Hartpury University

== Nottingham ==
=== Players In ===
- (England) Jake Bridges from (England) Coventry
- (Australia) Richard Clift from (Australia) Warringah
- (South Africa) Ronnie Du Randt from (England) Nottingham Trent University
- (Germany) Sebastian Ferreira from (England) Nottingham Trent University
- (England) Sam Green from (France) Bergerac
- (England) Antonio Harris from Jersey Reds
- (England) Ellis Mee from (England) Nottingham Trent University
- (England) Kai Owen from (England) Doncaster Knights
- (England) Will Yarnell from (England) Doncaster Knights
- (England) Jamie Annand from (England) University of Nottingham
- (Wales) Dafydd-Rhys Tiueti from (Wales) Cardiff Metropolitan University
- (France) Come Joussain from (France) Carcassonne

=== Players Out ===
- (England) Callum Allen to (England) Birmingham Moseley
- (Ireland) Ben Betts to (England) Birmingham Moseley
- (England) Lewis Barrett to (England) London Scottish

== See also ==
- List of 2023–24 Premiership Rugby transfers
- List of 2023–24 United Rugby Championship transfers
- List of 2023–24 Super Rugby transfers
- List of 2023–24 Top 14 transfers
- List of 2023–24 Rugby Pro D2 transfers
- List of 2023–24 Major League Rugby transfers
