= List of 2024–25 RFU Championship transfers =

This is a list of player transfers involving RFU Championship teams before or during the 2024–25 season. The list is of deals that are confirmed and are either from or to a rugby union team in the Championship during the 2023–24 season. It is not unknown for confirmed deals to be cancelled at a later date.

No clubs were promoted to the Gallagher Premiership for the 2024–25 season. On 14 April 2024, Chinnor won the National League 1 for the 2023–24 season, thus promoted to the 2024–25 RFU Championship season. No relegations were made for the 2023–24 season due to the liquidation of Jersey Reds.

== Ampthill ==
=== Players In ===
- (England) Richard Barrington from (France) Agen
- (Wales) Jordan Liney from (Wales) RGC 1404
- (New Zealand) Rhys Marshall from (New Zealand) Highlanders
- (Fiji) Vereimi Qorowale from (England) Newcastle Falcons
- (Fiji) Lekima Ravuvu from (England) British Army
- (New Zealand) Harrison Courtney from (England) Doncaster Knights
- (England) Benjy Joseland from (England) University of Exeter
- (Scotland) Karl Main from (Australia) Manly
- (Ireland) Oran McNulty from (Ireland) Connacht
- (England) Evan Mitchell from (England) Coventry
- (Ireland) Rory Morgan from (Wales) Cardiff Metropolitan University
- (Scotland) Jake Parkinson from (England) Brunel University
- (England) Archie English from (England) Blackheath
- (Australia) Oskar Hicks from (Australia) Sydney University
- (Tonga) Valentino Mapapalangi from (France) Rouen

=== Players Out ===
- (England) Josh Smart to (England) Blackheath
- (Wales) Morgan Strong to (England) Doncaster Knights
- (England) Ben Chapman to (England) Doncaster Knights
- (Ireland) Oli Morris to (England) Coventry
- (Wales) Gwyn Parks to (England) Nottingham
- (Wales) Iestyn Rees to (England) Cambridge
- (England) Pete White to (England) Cambridge
- (England) Josh Skelcey to (England) Cambridge
- (England) Zac Nearchou to (England) Cambridge

== Bedford Blues ==
=== Players In ===
- (England) Louis James from (England) Coventry
- (England) Tommy Herman from (England) Olney
- (England) Alfie Garside from (England) University of Bath
- (England) Rory Ward from (England) Newcastle University
- (England) Lucas Titherington from (England) Coventry
- (England) Shay Kerry from (Australia) Hunter Wildfires
- (England) Joel Matavesi from (England) Northampton Saints

=== Players Out ===
- (England) Louis Grimoldby to (England) Cambridge
- (Ireland) Bryan O'Connor to (Ireland) Ulster

== Cambridge ==
=== Players In ===
- (England) Louis Grimoldby from (England) Bedford Blues
- (England) Jack Bartlett from (England) Coventry
- (Wales) Iestyn Rees from (England) Ampthill
- (Scotland) Ruaridh Dawson from (England) Cornish Pirates
- (England) Pete White from (England) Ampthill
- (England) Kayde Sylvester from (England) Northampton Saints
- (England) Ollie Betteridge from (England) Coventry
- (England) Josh Skelcey from (England) Ampthill
- (England) Jake Bridges from (England) Nottingham
- (England) Zac Nearchou from (England) Ampthill
- (Wales) Arthur Lennon from (France) Langon
- (England) Matty Jones from (England) Gloucester

=== Players Out ===
- (England) Noah Sloot to (England) Blackheath
- (Wales) Steffan James to (England) Rosslyn Park

== Chinnor ==
=== Players In ===
- (Scotland) Nathan Chamberlain from (England) Hartpury University
- (England) Harry Dugmore from (England) Ealing Trailfinders
- (England) Scott Hall from (England) Nottingham
- (England) Callum Pascoe from (England) Darlington Mowden Park
- (England) Henry Pearson from (Australia) Manly

=== Players Out ===
- (England) Matt Woodward to (England) Rosslyn Park

== Cornish Pirates ==
=== Players In ===
- (England) Tom Georgiou from (England) Ealing Trailfinders
- (England) Harry Hocking from (England) Exeter Chiefs
- (England) Dan Hiscocks from (England) Ealing Trailfinders
- (England) Ollie Andrews from (England) Coventry
- (Wales) Iwan Price-Thomas from (England) University of Bath
- (England) Harry Yates from (England) Ealing Trailfinders (season-long loan)
- (Scotland) Cameron Jones from (Wales) Scarlets
- (England) Arthur Relton from (England) Exeter Chiefs
- (Ireland) James French from (Ireland) Ulster
- (England) Charlie Rice from (England) Bristol Bears
- (England) Matt Cannon from (England) Ealing Trailfinders (season-long loan)
- (Ireland) Oisin Michel from (Ireland) Connacht
- (England) Billy Keast from (England) Exeter Chiefs (season-long loan)
- (England) Jay Tyack from (England) Bristol Bears
- (England) Milo Hallam from (England) University of Exeter
- (England) Will Rigelsford from (England) Royal Navy
- (Ireland) Eoin O'Connor from (England) Exeter Chiefs (season-long loan)
- (England) Michael Etete from (England) Blackheath

=== Players Out ===
- (England) Steele Barker to (England) Bristol Bears
- (New Zealand) Marlen Walker retired
- (England) Will Britton retired
- (England) Jack Andrew retired
- (England) Kyle Moyle retired
- (Belgium) Jordan Gott released
- (England) Matt Johnson to (England) Coventry
- (Wales) Ioan Evans to (Wales) Pontypridd
- (Wales) Rhys Williams to (England) Plymouth Albion
- (Scotland) Ruaridh Dawson to (England) Cambridge
- (England) Josh Williams to (England) Doncaster Knights
- (England) Tom Pittman to (France) C'Chartres
- (Wales) Alex Schwarz to (England) Richmond
- (Wales) Morgan Nelson to (England) Gloucester

== Coventry ==
=== Players In ===
- (Wales) Dafydd-Rhys Tiueti from (England) Nottingham
- (England) Josh Barton from (England) Newcastle Falcons
- (England) Aaron Hinkley unattached
- (England) Jevaughn Warren from (England) Saracens
- (Wales) Rhys Anstey from (England) Ealing Trailfinders
- (England) Tom Hitchcock from (England) Ealing Trailfinders
- (Ireland) Daniel Okeke from (Ireland) Munster
- (England) Matt Johnson from (England) Cornish Pirates
- (Wales) Steff Davies from (Wales) Cardiff Metropolitan University RFC
- (England) Dan Green from (England) Newport (Salop)
- (England) Charlie Robson from (England) Rams
- (Australia) Liam Richman from (Scotland) Heriot's
- (Scotland) Jacob Henry from (Scotland) Edinburgh (season-long loan)
- (Ireland) Oli Morris from (England) Ampthill
- (England) Tommy Mathews from (England) Hartpury University

=== Players Out ===
- (United States) Paddy Ryan to (United States) San Diego Legion
- (England) Will Chudley retired
- (England) Jack Bartlett to (England) Cambridge
- (England) Leo Jowett to (England) Blackheath
- (England) Ollie Andrews to (England) Cornish Pirates
- (England) Louis James to (England) Bedford Blues
- (England) Tobi Wilson to (England) Ealing Trailfinders
- (Scotland) Adam Nicol to (England) Ealing Trailfinders
- (England) Toby Venner to (England) Nottingham
- (England) Will Wand to (England) Leicester Tigers
- (England) Ollie Betteridge to (England) Cambridge
- (England) George Smith to (England) Northampton Saints
- (England) Harry Stone to (England) Rams
- (England) Lucas Titherington to (England) Bedford Blues
- (Tonga) Patrick Pellegrini to (New Zealand) Moana Pasifika
- (England) Evan Mitchell to (England) Ampthill

== Doncaster Knights ==
=== Players In ===
- (Wales) Joe Jones from (Wales) Scarlets
- (England) Jordan Olowofela from (England) Nottingham
- (England) Fred Davies from (England) Bristol Bears
- (England) Morgan Bunting from (England) Nottingham
- (England) Thom Smith unattached
- (Fiji) George Wacokecoke from (England) Newcastle Falcons
- (England) Cory Teague from (England) Exeter Chiefs
- (Ireland) Zach Kerr from (England) Newcastle Falcons
- (England) Jasper McGuire from (England) Saracens
- (Samoa) Logovi'i Mulipola from (England) Saracens
- (Wales) Morgan Strong from (England) Ampthill
- (England) Ben Chapman from (England) Ampthill
- (Fiji) Taniela Ramasibana from (France) Perpignan
- (England) Josh Williams from (England) Cornish Pirates
- (England) Andrew Turner from (England) Bristol Bears (season-long loan)
- (England) Semesa Rokoduguni from (France) Montauban
- (England) Arthur Green from (England) Bath (season-long loan)
- (England) Will Parry from (England) Bath (season-long loan)
- (Tonga) Telusa Veainu from (England) Sale Sharks

=== Players Out ===
- (England) Tom Doughty to (England) Bristol Bears
- (Wales) Billy McBryde to (Wales) RGC 1404
- (England) Fyn Brown to (England) Northampton Saints
- (England) Ehize Ehizode to (England) Ealing Trailfinders
- (England) Jack Metcalf to (England) Newcastle Falcons
- (England) Joe Bedlow returned to (England) Sale Sharks
- (England) AJ Cant released
- (England) Andrew Foster released
- (Ireland) Evan Mintern released
- (England) Seb Nagle-Taylor released
- (England) Sam Olver released
- (England) Harry Wilson to (England) Saracens
- (England) Charlie Beckett retired
- (England) Karl Garside to (England) Sheffield Tigers
- (Australia) Jack Digby to (England) Rosslyn Park
- (England) Joe Margetts to (France) Bourg-en-Bresse
- (Ireland) Corrie Barrett to (Ireland) Ulster
- (New Zealand) Harrison Courtney to (England) Ampthill
- (Wales) George Simpson to (Australia) Manly

== Ealing Trailfinders ==
=== Players In ===
- (England) Ben Harris from (England) Saracens
- (England) Michael Stronge from (England) Nottingham
- (England) Sean Lonsdale from (Wales) Dragons
- (England) Sam Clark from (England) Newcastle Falcons
- (England) Tobi Wilson from (England) Coventry
- (England) George Worboys from (England) Bath
- (England) Ehize Ehizode from (England) Doncaster Knights
- (England) Geordie Irvine from (England) Northampton Saints
- (England) Francis Moore from (England) Saracens
- (Ireland) George Shaw from (Wales) Cardiff University
- (United States) Tomiwa Agbongbon from (England) Loughborough Students RUFC
- (Scotland) Adam Nicol from (England) Coventry
- (South Africa) Tyler Bocks from (South Africa) Lions
- (England) James Kenny from (England) Exeter Chiefs
- (Wales) Dan Jones from (Wales) Scarlets
- (Fiji) Jeneiro Wakeham from (France) Stade Français Paris
- (England) Matas Jurevicius from (England) Harlequins
- (South Africa) Siya Ningiza from (South Africa) Sharks (Currie Cup)
- (South Africa) Kabous Bezuidenhout from (South Africa) Sharks (Currie Cup)

=== Players Out ===
- (Wales) Steven Shingler to (England) London Welsh Amateur
- (Ireland) David O'Connor to (Ireland) Connacht
- (England) Dan Hiscocks to (England) Cornish Pirates
- (Wales) Rhys Anstey to (England) Coventry
- (England) Tom Hitchcock to (England) Coventry
- (England) Tom Georgiou to (England) Cornish Pirates
- (Wales) Jonah Holmes to (England) London Scottish
- (England) Jordan Burns to (England) Blackheath
- (England) Tom Jones to (England) Blackheath
- (Scotland) Findlay Gilmour to (England) Blackheath
- (New Zealand) Jimmy Roots to (England) Exeter Chiefs
- (England) Will Goodrick-Clarke to (England) Exeter Chiefs
- (England) Dan Lancaster to (France) Racing 92
- (England) Matt Cannon to (England) Cornish Pirates (season-long loan)
- (England) Harry Yates to (England) Cornish Pirates (season-long loan)
- (England) Billy Twelvetrees retired
- (Namibia) Richard Hardwick to (France) Grenoble
- (England) James Gibbons to (England) Hartpury University
- (England) Harry Dugmore to (England) Chinnor
- (England) James Cordy-Redden to (England) Rosslyn Park
- (South Africa) Luke Daniels released
- (England) Josh Gillespie released
- (South Africa) Pat Howard retired
- (Ireland) Ross Kane released
- (Ireland) Cian Kelleher retired
- (England) Simon Linsell retired
- (Ireland) Kevin O'Byrne retired
- (Wales) Brad Thyer retired
- (England) Gabe Hawley to (Wales) Scarlets
- (England) Henry Walker to (England) Northampton Saints
- (Scotland) Andrew Davidson to (Japan) Skyactivs Hiroshima

== Hartpury University ==
=== Players In ===
- (England) Ethan Hunt from (England) Gloucester
- (Spain) Jono Benz-Salomon from (England) Bristol Bears
- (Spain) Toti Benz-Salomon from (England) Bristol Bears
- (England) James Gibbons from (England) Ealing Trailfinders

=== Players Out ===
- (Scotland) Nathan Chamberlain to (England) Chinnor
- (England) Will Goffey to (England) Richmond
- (England) Tommy Mathews to (England) Coventry
- (England) Harry Bazalgette to (England) Bristol (short-term loan)

== London Scottish ==
=== Players In ===
- (Wales) Jonah Holmes from (England) Ealing Trailfinders
- (England) Alex Wardell from (England) Saracens
- (England) Tom Wilstead from (England) Rosslyn Park
- (Hong Kong) Callum Scott from (England) Rams
- (Scotland) Jake Spurway from (Scotland) Stirling Wolves
- (South Africa) Ntinga Mpiko from (England) Richmond
- (Scotland) George Morison from (Scotland) Heriot's

=== Players Out ===
- (England) Rhys Charamlambous to (England) Rosslyn Park
- (Wales) Elliott Haydon to (England) Rosslyn Park

== Nottingham ==
=== Players In ===
- (England) Dan Richardson from (England) Leicester Tigers
- (England) Matthew Arden from (England) Northampton Saints
- (England) Toby Venner from (England) Coventry
- (Wales) Gwyn Parks from (England) Ampthill
- (Sweden) Ale Loman from (England) University of Nottingham
- (England) Sam Mercer from (England) University of Bath
- (England) Levi Roper from (England) British Army
- (Fiji) Kody Vereti from (England) British Army
- (New Zealand) Kegan Christian-Goss from (England) Bury St Edmunds
- (England) Aman Johal from (England) Nottingham Trent University
- (England) Jai Johal from (England) Nottingham Trent University

=== Players Out ===
- (England) Jordan Olowofela to (England) Doncaster Knights
- (England) Morgan Bunting to (England) Doncaster Knights
- (England) Michael Stronge to (England) Ealing Trailfinders
- (Wales) Dafydd-Rhys Tiueti to (England) Coventry
- (Wales) Ellis Mee to (Wales) Scarlets
- (England) Jake Bridges to (England) Cambridge
- (England) Scott Hall to (England) Chinnor
- (France) Côme Joussain to (England) Leicester Tigers
- (Sweden) Ale Loman to (England) Leicester Tigers (short-term loan)

== See also ==
- List of 2024–25 Premiership Rugby transfers
- List of 2024–25 United Rugby Championship transfers
- List of 2024–25 Super Rugby transfers
- List of 2024–25 Top 14 transfers
- List of 2024–25 Rugby Pro D2 transfers
- List of 2024–25 Major League Rugby transfers
