= List of 2022–23 RFU Championship transfers =

This is a list of player transfers involving RFU Championship teams before or during the 2021–22 season. The list is of deals that are confirmed and are either from or to a rugby union team in the Championship during the 2022–23 season. It is not unknown for confirmed deals to be cancelled at a later date. On 25 April 2022, Caldy won the National League 1 competition to be promoted into the RFU Championship from the 2022–23 season, with no team relegated to National League 1. No clubs were promoted to the Gallagher Premiership for the 2022–23 season.

== Ampthill ==
=== Players In ===
- (Wales) Syd Blackmore from (England) Cornish Pirates
- (England) Jake Elwood from (England) London Scottish
- (England) Dom Hardman from (New Zealand) Waikato
- (England) Matt Gallagher from (England) Sedgley Park
- (England) Joe Sproston from (France) Dijon
- (Ireland) Griff Phillipson from (England) Loughborough Students
- (Ireland) Caleb Montgomery from (England) Worcester Warriors
- (Wales) Morgan Strong from (Wales) Ospreys
- (England) Harry Wilson from (England) London Scottish
- (England) Charlie Gowling from (England) Richmond
- (England) Sam Hanks from (England) London Scottish
- (England) Tom Hardwick from (France) Albi
- (Wales) Gwyn Parks from (Wales) Swansea University
- (Ireland) Conor Rankin from (Ireland) Ulster
- (England) Pete White from (England) Coventry
- (Ireland) Tom Bacon from (England) Wasps
- (England) Beck Cutting from (England) Worcester Warriors
- (England) Rob Hardwick from (England) Wasps
- (England) James Tunney from (England) Wasps
- (England) Fyn Brown from (England) Wasps

=== Players Out ===
- (England) Jamie Jack to (Scotland) Edinburgh
- (Wales) Jac Arthur to (England) Bedford Blues
- (England) Russell Bennett to Jersey Reds
- (England) Jack Dickinson to (England) Nottingham
- (England) Joe-Luca Smith to (England) Rosslyn Park
- (England) Matt Wilkinson to (England) London Scottish
- (England) Billy Harding to (England) Rosslyn Park

== Bedford Blues ==
=== Players In ===
- (England) Jac Arthur from (England) Ampthill
- (England) Charlie Ryland from (Wales) Cardiff Metropolitan University
- (Jersey) Michael Le Bourgeois from (England) Wasps
- (England) Monty Royston from (England) Durham University
- (Ireland) Seán French from (Ireland) Munster
- (England) Lewis Holsey from (England) Worcester Warriors
- (England) Kieran Curran from (England) Wasps

=== Players Out ===
- (England) Richard Lane to (England) Bristol Bears
- (England) Will Biggs to (England) Coventry
- (England) Bailey Ransom released
- (England) Andre Robson released
- (England) Ollie Stedman to (England) Birmingham Moseley
- (England) Josh Pieterse to (England) Chinnor

== Caldy ==
=== Players In ===
- Dan Bibby from England Sevens
- (England) Louis Beer from (England) Cambridge

=== Players Out ===
- (England) Lucas Titherington to (England) Coventry

== Cornish Pirates ==
=== Players In ===
- (England) Will Crane from (England) Hartpury University
- (Wales) Morgan Nelson from (Wales) Cardiff Metropolitan University
- (England) Steele Barker from (England) Redruth
- (Wales) Olly White from (England) University of Exeter
- (England) Will Tredwin from (England) Redruth
- (Wales) Garyn Smith from (Wales) Cardiff
- (Wales) Alex Everett from (Wales) Cardiff RFC
- (England) Will Britton from (England) Gloucester
- (England) Olly Adkins from (England) Gloucester (season-long loan)
- (Wales) James Fender from (Wales) Ospreys (season-long loan)
- (England) Josh Williams unattached
- (England) Seb Nagle-Taylor from (England) Gloucester
- (England) Harvey Beaton from (England) Saracens (season-long loan)
- (England) Jarrad Hayler from (England) Royal Navy

=== Players Out ===
- (England) Tom Channon retired
- (England) Danny Cutmore to (England) Ealing Trailfinders
- (Argentina) Nicolas de Battista retired
- (Ireland) Callum Patterson retired
- (England) Sam Rodman to (England) Hartpury University
- (England) Tom Duncan retired
- (England) Matt Bolwell to (England) Rosslyn Park
- (England) Josh Caulfield to (England) London Irish
- (Wales) Ed Scragg to (England) London Irish
- (Ireland) Alex O'Meara to (England) Richmond
- (Wales) Syd Blackmore to (England) Ampthill
- (New Zealand) Antonio Kiri Kiri to (England) Maidenhead

== Coventry ==
=== Players In ===
- (Wales) Will Talbot-Davies from (Wales) Dragons
- (England) Harry Seward from (England) Ealing Trailfinders
- (England) Will Biggs from (England) Bedford Blues
- (England) Ollie Andrews from (Wales) Cardiff Metropolitan University
- (England) Jordon Poole from (England) Exeter Chiefs
- (England) Lucas Titherington from (England) Caldy
- (Australia) Patrick Pellegrini from (England) Sevenoaks
- (Netherlands) Marjin Huis from (England) Durham University
- (England) Will Rigg from (Wales) Cardiff Metropolitan University
- (England) Will Wand from (England) Cambridge
- (England) Will Lane from Jersey Reds
- (England) Shea Cornish from (England) Exeter Chiefs (season-long loan)
- (England) Danny Southworth from (England) Exeter Chiefs (season-long loan)
- (England) George Smith from (England) Old Redcliffians
- (England) Will Chudley from (England) Worcester Warriors
- (Scotland) Tom Dodd from (England) Worcester Warriors
- (England) Tobi Wilson from (England) Worcester Warriors

=== Players Out ===
- (England) Phil Boulton released
- (England) Nile Dacres released
- (England) Tony Fenner released
- (England) Andy Forsyth released
- (England) Luc Jeannot released
- (England) Rob Stevenson released
- (England) Ryan Burrows retired
- (England) Josh Barton to (England) Newcastle Falcons
- (England) Rob Knox to (England) Birmingham Moseley
- (Wales) Will Owen to (England) Clifton
- (England) Pete White to (England) Ampthill
- (England) Tom Emery to (England) Henley Hawks

== Doncaster Knights ==
=== Players In ===
- (England) Karl Garside from (England) Northampton Saints
- (England) Jared Cardew from (England) Richmond
- (England) Will Yarnell from (England) University of Exeter
- (England) George Simpson from (England) Hartpury University
- (England) Robbie Smith from (England) Hartpury University
- (England) Ehize Ehizode from (England) London Scottish
- (Scotland) Mak Wilson from (England) Harlequins
- (Scotland) Sam Daly from (Scotland) Watsonians
- (England) Maurice Nwakor from (England) London Scottish
- (Chile) Martin Segren from (Chile) Selknam
- (England) Kai Owen from (England) Worcester Warriors
- (England) Jake Armstrong from (England) Bristol Bears
- (England) Theo Vukašinović from (England) Wasps
- (England) Jack Metcalf from (England) Ealing Trailfinders

=== Players Out ===
- (England) Sam Graham to (England) Northampton Saints
- (Argentina) Guido Volpi to (Italy) Zebre Parma
- (England) Danny Drake to (New Zealand) North Harbour
- (Spain) Josh Peters to (England) Newcastle Falcons
- (England) Gareth Denman retired
- (England) Jack Davies to (England) Hartpury University
- (Australia) Liam Usher released
- (Scotland) Lloyd Wheeldon released
- (Wales) Kyle Evans to (England) Wakefield Trinity
- (Ireland) Mark Best to (Ireland) Ballynahinch
- (England) Charlie Connolly to (England) Chinnor

== Ealing Trailfinders ==
=== Players In ===
- (England) Ollie Fox from (England) Bath
- (England) Danny Cutmore from (England) Cornish Pirates
- (Ireland) Kevin O'Byrne from (Ireland) Munster
- (England) Dan Lancaster unattached
- (Ireland) Ross Kane from (Ireland) Ulster
- (England) Ollie Newman from (England) Northampton Saints
- (Australia) Carlo Tizzano from (Australia) NSW Waratahs
- (England) David Douglas-Bridge from (England) Loughborough Students
- (Wales) Jonah Holmes from (Wales) Dragons
- (England) Rob Farrar from (England) Newcastle Falcons
- (England) Will Montgomery from (England) Newcastle Falcons
- (England) Josh Gillespie from (England) Northampton Saints
- (Ireland) David O'Connor from (Ireland) Ulster
- (Ireland) Peter Robb from (Ireland) Connacht
- (England) Jack Metcalf from (England) Sale Sharks
- (Australia) Jack Grant from (Australia) NSW Waratahs
- (England) Eparama Rokodrava from (England) Wasps
- (England) Nathan Earle from (England) Newcastle Falcons
- (Wales) Rhys Anstey from (Wales) Cardiff
- (Scotland) Andrew Davidson from (England) Gloucester
- (England) Lewis Boyce from (England) Bath

=== Players Out ===
- (England) Harry Seward to (England) Coventry
- (England) James Cannon released
- (Australia) Matt Gordon to (England) Rosslyn Park
- (England) Charlie Walker to (England) Rosslyn Park
- (England) Harry Hunter to (England) Richmond
- (Ireland) Bill Johnston to (England) Richmond
- (Ireland) Stephen Kerins to (England) Richmond
- (Ireland) Taine Wagstaff to (England) Rosslyn Park
- (South Africa) Gary Porter to (South Africa) Stormers
- (England) Elliot Chivers to (England) London Scottish (season-long loan)
- (South Africa) Len Massyn to (France) Blagnac
- (Ireland) Shane Buckley to (Ireland) Highfield
- (Ireland) Tadgh McElroy to (Ireland) Leinster
- (England) Jack Metcalf to (England) Doncaster Knights

== Hartpury University ==
=== Players In ===
- (England) Sam Rodman from (England) Cornish Pirates
- (England) Jack Davies from (England) Doncaster Knights
- (Wales) Harry Fry from (Wales) Dragons
- (England) Alex Forrester from (England) Clifton
- (England) Mathew Ward from (England) Newcastle Falcons

=== Players Out ===
- (England) James Williams to (England) Bristol Bears
- (England) Will Crane to (England) Cornish Pirates
- (England) George Simpson to (England) Doncaster Knights
- (England) Robbie Smith to (England) Doncaster Knights
- (Spain) Jono Benz-Salomon to (England) Bristol Bears
- (Spain) Toti Benz-Salomon to (England) Bristol Bears
- (Wales) Oscar Lennon to (England) Bristol Bears
- (England) Shaun Knight to (England) Cinderford
- (Wales) Aled Ward to (Wales) Pontypridd
- (England) Oli Robinson to (England) Rosslyn Park
- (Ireland) Conor Maguire to (England) Richmond

== Jersey Reds ==
=== Players In ===
- (Scotland) Sam Grahamslaw from (Scotland) Edinburgh
- (England) James Hadfield from (England) Richmond
- (Wales) Tomi Lewis from (Wales) Scarlets
- (England) Monty Weatherby from (England) Sandbach
- (Australia) Ben Woollett from (Australia) Warringah
- (Scotland) Hamish Bain from (Scotland) Glasgow Warriors
- (England) James Dun from (England) Bristol Bears (season-long loan)
- (England) Charlie Powell from (England) Bristol Bears (season-long loan)
- (Wales) Ethan Rault from (Wales) Scarlets
- (England) James Scott from (England) Worcester Warriors
- (England) Russell Bennett from (England) Ampthill
- (England) Josh Gray from (England) Gloucester (season-long loan)
- (England) Jonny Law from (England) Leicester Tigers
- (Ireland) Alex McHenry from (Ireland) Munster
- (England) Toby Venner from (England) Gloucester
- (Ireland) Greg McGrath from (Ireland) Connacht
- (Wales) Ben Burnell from (Wales) Cardiff

=== Players Out ===
- (South Africa) Wesley White to (England) Bath
- (England) Jack Higgins released
- (England) Guy Thompson retired
- (England) Sam Leeming released
- (England) Ryan Olowofela released
- (Wales) Jack Roberts released
- (England) Harry Simmons returned to (England) Leicester Tigers
- (England) Will Lane to (England) Coventry
- (Wales) Alex Humfrey to (England) Rosslyn Park
- (England) James Flynn to (England) Saracens
- (Wales) Max Ayling to (England) Sale FC
- (South Africa) Roy Godfrey to Jersey Athletic
- (Scotland) Jack Macfarlane to Jersey Athletic

== London Scottish ==
=== Players In ===
- (Wales) Zach Clow from (Wales) RGC 1404
- (England) Sam Smith from (England) Leeds Beckett University
- (England) Dan Cuthbert from (England) Loughborough Students
- (England) Matt Wilkinson from (England) Ampthill
- (Scotland) Nathan Chamberlain from (Scotland) Edinburgh
- (Scotland) Robbie McCallum from (Scotland) Glasgow Warriors
- (England) Theo Manihera from (England) Nottingham
- (Italy) Luca Petrozzi from (Italy) Benetton
- (England) Harry Hill from (England) Northumbria University
- (England) Elliot Chivers from (England) Ealing Trailfinders (season-long loan)
- (England) Austin Wallis from (England) Loughborough Students
- (Scotland) Cameron Anderson from (England) Wasps

=== Players Out ===
- (England) Tom Petty to (England) Plymouth Albion
- (England) Ehize Ehizode to (England) Doncaster Knights
- (England) Jake Elwood to (England) Ampthill
- (England) Maurice Nwakor to (England) Doncaster Knights
- (England) Harry Wilson to (England) Ampthill
- (England) Sam Hanks to (England) Ampthill

== Nottingham ==
=== Players In ===
- (Scotland) Ross Bundy from (France) Rennes
- (England) Harry Clayton from (England) Newcastle University
- (England) Jack Dickinson from (England) Ampthill
- Michael Green from Hong Kong Scottish
- (New Zealand) Iosefa Maloney-Fiola from (New Zealand) Bay of Plenty
- Jack Neville from Hong Kong Sevens
- (New Zealand) Javiah Pohe from (England) South Leicester
- Liam Slatem from Hong Kong Scottish
- (England) Xavier Valentine from (England) Leeds Tykes
- (England) Jordan Olowofela from (England) Leicester Tigers

=== Players Out ===
- (Portugal) Jose Andrade released
- (Ireland) Liam Bishop released
- (England) Jake Farnworth released
- (England) Jack Ramshaw released
- (South Africa) Storm Hanekom to (England) Newport (Salop)
- (England) Matt Marsh to (England) Birmingham Moseley
- (England) Elliot Creed to (England) Birmingham Moseley
- (England) Josh McNulty to (England) Chinnor
- (England) Elliot Bale to (France) Dijon
- (England) Theo Manihera to (England) London Scottish

== Richmond ==
=== Players In ===
- (Ireland) Tom Caesar from (Ireland) Ulster
- (England) Paddy Case from (England) Leeds Tykes
- (England) George Cave from (England) University of Bath
- (England) Harry Hunter from (England) Ealing Trailfinders
- (Ireland) Bill Johnston from (England) Ealing Trailfinders
- (Ireland) Stephen Kerins from (England) Ealing Trailfinders
- (Ireland) Conor Maguire from (England) Hartpury University
- (Wales) Bailey Marshall-Telfer from (Wales) Cardiff Metropolitan University
- (England) Tom Mills from (England) Saracens
- (Ireland) Alex O'Meara from (England) Cornish Pirates
- (England) Ayanfe Oladukun from (England) University of Bristol
- (England) Raz Patel from (England) University of Bath
- (Hong Kong) Alex Post from (England) Oxford University
- (Scotland) Freddie Owsley from (Scotland) Edinburgh

=== Players Out ===
- (England) Jared Cardew to (England) Doncaster Knights
- (England) James Hadfield to Jersey Reds
- (Wales) Luc Jones to (England) Rosslyn Park
- (England) Jack Rouse to (England) Esher
- (England) Fred Hoskins to (England) Rosslyn Park
- (England) Max Trimble to (England) Rosslyn Park
- (England) Charlie Gowling to (England) Ampthill

== See also ==
- List of 2022–23 Premiership Rugby transfers
- List of 2022–23 United Rugby Championship transfers
- List of 2022–23 Super Rugby transfers
- List of 2022–23 Top 14 transfers
- List of 2022–23 Rugby Pro D2 transfers
- List of 2022–23 Major League Rugby transfers
