= Charlie Beckett =

English rugby union footballer

- Born: Charles George M. Beckett; 3 November 1995 (age 31) Liverpool, England
- Height: 1.94 m (6 ft 4 in)
- Weight: 119 kg (18 st 10 lb)
- Notable relative: Sarah Beckett (sister)

Rugby union career
- Position: Lock/Blindside Flanker
Senior career
Years	Team	Apps	(Points)
2014–2015	Leicester Tigers	3	(0)
2016–2018	Gloucester	6	(0)
2017	→ London Welsh	4	(5)
2018	→ Hartpury College	2	(0)
2018–2020	Jersey Reds	41	(10)
2020	Gloucester	2	(0)
2021–2024	Ampthill		
2024-	Doncaster Knights		
- Correct as of 5 October 2020
International career
Years	Team	Apps	(Points)
2014–2015	England U18s		
2015–2016	England U20s		
- Correct as of 29 September 2020

Charlie Beckett (born 3 November 1995) is an English rugby union player for Doncaster Knights in the RFU Championship.

Originally part of Leicester Tigers academy, he made the switch to Gloucester academy where he captained Gloucester United in the 'A' League competition. He was also dual-registered with London Welsh and Hartpury College in lower league competitions for professional development.

He represented England U18s back in the 2014–15 season. He was also named in the England U20s for the 2015 Six Nations Under 20s Championship and for the 2015 World Rugby Under 20 Championship.

On 2 May 2018, Beckett signed a two-year professional contract with RFU Championship side Jersey Reds from the 2018–19 season. On 19 August 2020, Beckett left Jersey with immediate effect because the English Championship for the 2019–20 season stopped due to the coronavirus pandemic, he re-signed with old club Gloucester on a short-term deal for the remainder of the season.

He signed for Ampthill ahead of the 2020–21 season. He moved once more in Summer 2024 signing for Doncaster Knights ahead of the 2024-25 Championship season.
