= Jake Armstrong (rugby union) =

English rugby union player

- Born: Jake Armstrong; 17 March 1994 (age 32) England
- Height: 1.85 m (6 ft 1 in)
- Weight: 115 kg (254 lb; 18 st 2 lb)
- School: Woodhouse Grove School
- University: Leeds Beckett

Rugby union career
- Position: Prop
- Current team: Wharfedale RUFC
Senior career
Years	Team	Apps	(Points)
2013	Leeds Tykes	1	(0)
2015–2016	Doncaster Knights	4	(0)
2016–2018	Jersey Reds	50	(25)
2018–2022	Bristol Bears	33	(10)
2019	→ Hartpury University (D/R)	4	(0)
2020	→ Hartpury University (D/R)	3	(0)
2022	→ Edinburgh Rugby (loan)	2	(0)
2022	→ Doncaster Knights (loan)	0	(0)
2023-	Wharfedale RUFC		
- Correct as of 21 September 2023

Jake Armstrong (born 17 March 1994) is an English rugby union player. Armstrong's primary position is prop.

== Rugby Union career ==
=== Professional career ===
Armstrong played for Leeds Tykes, Doncaster Knights and Jersey Reds before joining the Bristol Bears in 2018. He joined Edinburgh on loan in February 2022. He made his Edinburgh debut on 11 February in the re-arranged Round 8 match of the 2021–22 United Rugby Championship against Leinster. He departed Bristol Bears on 26 October 2022, he had been on loan to Doncaster Knights since September.
