= Oliver Fox (rugby union) =

English rugby union player

- Born: Oliver James Fox; 14 March 1999 (age 27) Dewsbury, Yorkshire, England
- Height: 1.8 m (5 ft 11 in)
- Weight: 87 kg (13 st 10 lb)
- School: New College, Pontefract

Rugby union career
- Position: Scrum-half
- Current team: Doncaster Knights
Amateur team(s)
Years	Team	Apps	(Points)
- Sandal
Senior career
Years	Team	Apps	(Points)
2016–2019	Yorkshire Carnegie	20	(15)
2019–2022	Bath	19	(5)
2022–2023	Ealing Trailfinders		
2023–	→ Randwick (loan)		
2023–	Doncaster Knights		
- Correct as of 27 June 2022
International career
Years	Team	Apps	(Points)
2017–2018	England U18s	6	(0)
2018–2019	England U20s	9	(5)
- Correct as of 25 January 2021

Oliver Fox (born 14 March 1999) is an English rugby union player for Ealing Trailfinders in the RFU Championship, and previously for Bath in the Premiership Rugby. His main position is scrum-half.

== Career ==
An early convert from rugby league, Fox played the 13-a-side game from the age of five and joined Wakefield-based Sandal RUFC four years later. He switched to the Yorkshire Carnegie Academy when 14. He played for England U18s during their tour in South Africa.

He made his senior debut for Carnegie against Newport Gwent Dragons in the 2016-17 British and Irish Cup back in December 2016. He later made his league debut in the Greene King IPA Championship at Jersey Reds in November 2017.

He was called up to the England U20s squad for the 2019 Six Nations Under 20s Championship and for the 2019 World Rugby Under 20 Championship.

On 14 March 2019, Fox left Yorkshire Carnegie to sign for Premiership side Bath from the 2019–20 season. He made his first-team debut for Bath against Exeter Chiefs in the Premiership Rugby Cup during the 2019–20 season. He later moved to Ealing Trailfinders where he played for the first half of the 2023-23 season before joining Randwick during the second half of that season. before signing for Doncaster Knights ahead of the 2023-24 Championship season.
