= Seb Nagle-Taylor =

English rugby union footballer

- Born: Sebastian Nagle-Taylor; 16 June 1997 (age 29) Winchester, Hampshire, England
- Height: 1.85 m (6 ft 1 in)
- Weight: 109 kg (17 st 2 lb)
- School: South Island School, Eastbourne College
- University: University College London

Rugby union career
- Position: Number eight
- Current team: Doncaster Knights
Youth career
- 2003-2007: Valley Fort RFC
- 2007-2012: Eastbourne College
Senior career
| Years | Team | Apps | (Points) |
| 2012-2013 | Rosslyn Park | | |
| 2013 | → Barking | | |
| 2013-2015 | Blackheath | | |
| 2015-2016 | Bedford Blues | 4 | (0) |
| 2016-2017 | Ealing Trailfinders | 7 | (5) |
| 2017-2018 | Jersey Reds | 12 | (10) |
| 2018-2019 | Rotherham Titans | 30 | (105) |
| 2019-2021 | Hartpury University | 19 | (25) |
| 2020–2022 | → Gloucester | 3 | (5) |
| 2022–2024 | Cornish Pirates | | |
| 2024– | Doncaster Knights | | |
- Correct as of 18 December 2020
International career
| Years | Team | Apps | (Points) |
- England Counties U20
- England Students
- Correct as of 18 December 2020
National sevens team
| Years | Team | | Comps |
| 2014-2015 | England | | 12 (5) |

Sebastian "Seb" Nagle-Taylor (born 16 September 1994) is an English professional rugby player who plays as a Number eight for Doncaster Knights.

== Club career ==
Born in Winchester, Nagle-Taylor spent his childhood in Hong Kong, starting to play rugby aged nine in the Valley RFC academy. In 2007, he went back to England in Sussex, joining Eastbourne College in Gonville House. There he ended up captaining both XV and the 7s team, following the steps of rugby players such as Hugo Southwell or Will Green.

From 2012 to 2015 he did a degree in history at the University College London, starting his club career in the meantime. Sebastian first signed for the National League 1 side Rosslyn Park, but actually making his debut on loan in Barking.

He had previous experience in the RFU Championship with Bedford Blues, Ealing Trailfinders and Jersey Reds. He signed for third division Rotherham Titans in the National League 1 for the 2018–19 season, where he captained the side on numerous occasions. On 3 May 2019, Nagle-Taylor returns to the Championship with Hartpury University for the 2019–20 season.

He joined Gloucester in the Premiership Rugby on a short-term loan during the 2020–21 season. His impressive performances lead him to sign a permanent deal with the Premiership side from the 2021–22 season. He will return to Hartpury back for the remaining Championship season before permanently joining Gloucester in the summer of 2021.

On 28 June 2022, Nagle-Taylor returned to the Championship as he signed for Cornish Pirates during the 2022–23 season. He moved once more in Summer 2024 signing for Doncaster Knights ahead of the 2024-25 Championship season.

== International career ==
Nagle-Taylor made his debut with England Counties U20 against Georgia U20s, later also being involved with the England Students, a selection of university students.

Nagle-Taylor played with England Sevens during the 2014–15 season.
