= James Flynn (rugby union) =

English rugby union player

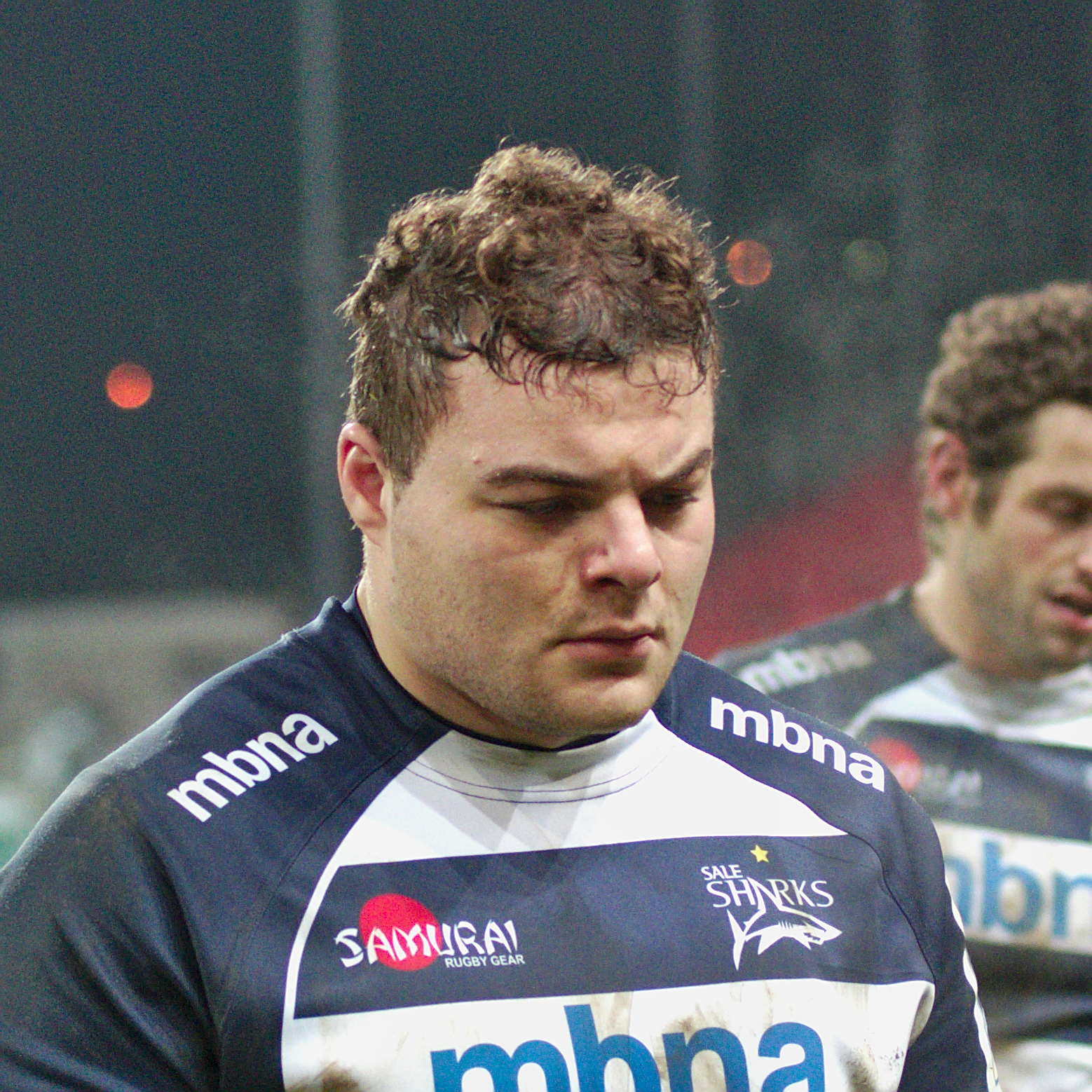
- Flynn playing for Sale Sharks in 2013
- Born: James Michael Flynn; 5 October 1993 (age 33) Sale, England
- Height: 1.83 m (6 ft 0 in)
- Weight: 120 kg (18 st 13 lb; 265 lb)
- School: Stockport Grammar School

Rugby union career
- Position: Prop
Senior career
Years	Team	Apps	(Points)
2012–2019	Sale Sharks	55	(5)
2012–2013	→ Stockport	20	(15)
2013–2014	→ Sedgley Park	16	(15)
2019–2020	Yorkshire Carnegie	8	(0)
2020–2021	Ampthill	0	(0)
2021–2022	Jersey Reds	0	(0)
2022–	Saracens		
- Correct as of 12 February 2021

James Michael Flynn (born 5 October 1993 in Sale, England) is a rugby union player for the Saracens in the Premiership Rugby. He plays as a prop. He made his professional debut for Sale Sharks against London Irish on 11 November 2012.
