= Kai Owen (rugby union) =

English rugby union player (born 1999)

- Born: Kai James Owen; 27 February 1999 (age 27) Shrewsbury, Shropshire, England
- Height: 1.83 m (6 ft 0 in)
- Weight: 115 kg (18 st 2 lb)

Rugby union career
- Position: Loosehead Prop
Senior career
Years	Team	Apps	(Points)
2018–2022	Worcester Warriors	23	(5)
2019	→ Hartpury University (loan)	2	(0)
2019	→ Yorkshire Carnegie (loan)	1	(0)
2021	→ Coventry (loan)	2	(0)
2022–2023	Doncaster Knights	12	(0)
2023–2025	Nottingham RFC	44	(10)
2025–	Chinnor RFC	21	(10)
- Correct as of 7 April 2026
International career
Years	Team	Apps	(Points)
2019	England U20	8	(0)
- Correct as of 30 June 2019

Kai Owen (born 27 February 1999) is an English rugby union player who plays for Chinnor RFC in the RFU Championship. His main position is loosehead prop.

His first played junior rugby with Telford Hornets at age eight, he was part of Worcester Warriors junior academy before released from the club. He gained senior experience with Coventry, Bridgnorth, Shropshire-based Newport and North Midlands U20s, before returning to Worcester senior academy for the 2017–18 season.

He made his senior debut for Worcester in a European Rugby Challenge Cup match against Stade Français Paris as a replacement back in October 2018. His home debut came 12 months later when Owen replaced Ryan Bower in the opening minutes of the Premiership Rugby Cup match against Exeter Chiefs.

Owen started the 2019–20 season on a dual registration with Championship clubs Hartpury University and Yorkshire Carnegie in the same competition on a similar arrangement in November 2019.

Owen again came off the bench for Bower in the European Rugby Challenge Cup victory over Enisei-STM in Russia in November 2019, and made his Premiership debut as a replacement against Bristol Bears at Ashton Gate in February 2020.

He made his England U20s debut in the 2019 Six Nations Under 20s Championship and his consistent performances secured Owen a place in England's squad for the 2019 World Rugby Under 20 Championship in Argentina.

On 27 June 2020, Owen signed his first professional contract to stay with Worcester at Sixways Stadium, thus promoted to the senior squad from the 2020–21 season. He signed a deal in March 2021 that would also see him dual registered with Championship side Coventry. Due to the administration of Worcester Warriors, all players had their contracts terminated on 5 October 2022.

After his Worcester contract was terminated he signed for Championship side Doncaster Knights. After this he signed for both Nottingham R.F.C. and Chinnor R.F.C. both in Champ Rugby
