= Josh Gillespie =

English rugby union player (born 2000)

- Born: 20 October 2000 (age 26) Sydney, Australia
- Height: 1.88 m (6 ft 2 in)
- Weight: 94 kg (14 st 11 lb)
- School: Millfield

Rugby union career
- Position: Wing
Senior career
Years	Team	Apps	(Points)
2018-2022	Northampton Saints		
2019-2020	→ Ampthill RUFC (loan)		
2021-2022	→ Bedford Blues (loan)		
2022-2023	Ealing Trailfinders		
2022	→ London Scottish (loan)		
International career
Years	Team	Apps	(Points)
2019	England U18s		
2020	England U20s		

Josh Gillespie (born 20 October 2000) is an English rugby union player who plays as a Winger.

== Early life ==
Born in Sydney, Australia, Gillespie started playing rugby union for Centaurs RFC when his family moved to Singapore. As a teenager, he was educated at Millfield in Somerset. He initially played in the academy at Bath Rugby before joining the academy at Northampton Saints.

== Career ==
Gillespie became the youngest player in Northampton Saints professional history, aged era at 18 years and 15 days, when he made his debut against Wasps RFC in the Premiership Rugby Cup in 2018. He also played Premiership Rugby 7s for Northampton. He scored a try on his Premiership Rugby debut against Bristol Bears in September 2020.

In August 2022, he signed for Ealing Trailfinders in the Rugby Championship during the 2022-2023 season, having also previously on loan from Northampton in that division for Ampthill RUFC and Bedford Blues. In 2022, he also spent time on loan at London Scottish.

In February 2024, he joined Rugby League side Leeds Rhinos on a month's trial.

== International career ==
Gillespie represented England at U18 and U20 level.
