= Ale Loman =

Swedish rugby union player

- Born: 15 May 2000 (age 26) Lund, Sweden
- Height: 192 cm (6 ft 4 in)
- Weight: 134 kg (295 lb; 21 st 1 lb)
- University: University of Nottingham

Rugby union career
- Position: Prop
- Current team: Leicester Tigers
Senior career
Years	Team	Apps	(Points)
2024–2025	Nottingham	26	(0)
2025–	Leicester Tigers	20	(0)
- Correct as of 16 November 2026
International career
Years	Team	Apps	(Points)
2021–	Sweden		(30)
- Correct as of 23 November 2025

Ale Loman (born 15 May 2000) is a Swedish rugby union player, who plays for the Leicester Tigers. His preferred position is prop.

== Early career ==
Loman was born in Lund and began playing rugby aged 17 for local side Lugi Lions. After attending Lund University where he graduated with a MSc in Engineering Physics, he attended the University of Nottingham continuing to play rugby.

== Club career ==
Loman originally signed for Nottingham in June 2024, having previously represented his university BUCS side. After a number of appearances in the 2024/25 season, he joined Leicester Tigers on loan in February 2025. He re-signed with Nottingham in May 2025, however has continued representing Leicester as part of a dual-registration agreement. He made his Premiership Rugby debut for Leicester in October 2025 against Northampton Saints.

== International career ==
Loman has represented the Swedish national side since 2021. He has played every competitive game since his debut, scoring six tries. He is noted for his ability to score tries from distances up to 30 metres.

In November 2025 he appeared as a second half substitute for Sweden in the game against Lithuania having played 48 minutes for Nottingham the night before.
