= Tom Pittman (rugby union) =

American rugby union player

- Born: 8 April 1999 (age 27) Taunton, England
- Height: 180 cm (5 ft 11 in)
- Weight: 88 kg (194 lb; 13 st 12 lb)

Rugby union career
- Position: Fly-half / Centre
Senior career
| Years | Team | Apps | (Points) |
| 2021–2023 | Jersey Reds | 15 | (22) |
| 2023–2024 | Cornish Pirates | 19 | (74) |
| 2024–2025 | Chartres | | |
| 2026 | Anthem Carolina | | |
- Correct as of 8 December 2025
International career
| Years | Team | Apps | (Points) |
| 2025– | United States | 3 | (0) |
- Correct as of 8 December 2025

Tom Pittman (born 8 April 1999) is an English-born American rugby union player who played for the Anthem Carolina in Major League Rugby (MLR). His preferred position is fly-half or centre.

== Early career ==
Pittman is from Taunton in Somerset, England and attended the University of Bath while a member of the Bath Rugby academy. After finish university, he joined the Boroughmuir Bears in Scotland's Super 6 competition. He is USA-qualified through his grandfather.

== Professional career ==
Pittman's first signed professionally for the Jersey Reds in October 2021, In June 2023, he transferred to the Cornish Pirates, before moving to France to join fifth tier Chartres. After debuting for the United States, he signed for Anthem Carolina ahead of the 2026 Major League Rugby season.

Pittman made his debut for the United States national team in July 2025, debuting against Spain.
