= 2024–25 RFU Championship =

Rugby union competition in England

- Countries: England
- Date: 20 September 2024 – 31 May 2025
- Champions: Ealing Trailfinders (3rd title)
- Runners-up: Bedford Blues
- Matches played: 132
- Attendance: 206,008 (average 1,561 per match)
- Highest attendance: 5,000 – Bedford v Cambridge, 28 December 2024
- Lowest attendance: 324 – Caldy v Cornish Pirates, 7 December 2024
- Tries scored: 1137 (average 8.6 per match)
- Top point scorer: 238 – William Maisey (Bedford)
- Top try scorer: 20 – Dean Adamson (Bedford)

The 2024–25 RFU Championship was the sixteenth season of the RFU Championship, the professional second tier of rugby union in England. It featured twelve English teams. Ealing Trailfinders were the reigning champions, having been refused promotion to the Premiership due to failing to meet minimum standards.

Ealing Trailfinders finished as champions on 17 May following a decisive victory away to Caldy, giving them the title with two games still left to play. Despite winning their second RFU Championship title in a row (and third overall) the minimum standards ruling meant that once again they were ineligible for promotion. Cambridge finished bottom but due to the Championship increasing from 12 to 14 teams for the following season, there was no relegation.

== Structure ==
The twelve teams will play each of the other teams twice.

The results of the matches contribute points to the league as follows:

- 4 points are awarded for a win
- 2 points are awarded for a draw
- 0 points are awarded for a loss, however
- 1 losing (bonus) point is awarded to a team that loses a match by 7 points or fewer
- 1 additional (bonus) point is awarded to a team scoring 4 tries or more in a match.

=== Promotion and relegation ===
Subject to meeting the minimum standards criteria the team finishing top of the league will qualify for a promotion playoff against the bottom side in Premiership Rugby while the team that finishes bottom will be typically relegated to National League 1.

Relegation this season would be different as earlier in the season it had been indicated that the RFU Championship was due to increase from 12 to 14 teams for 2025–26. This was finally confirmed by the RFU with most of the season completed, meaning that no clubs would be relegated at the end of 2024–25.

In March 2025 it was confirmed that only Doncaster Knights were eligible for promotion to the premiership.

== Teams ==
Locations of the 2024–25 RFU Championship teams

Eleven of the twelve teams played in last season's competition. Chinnor were promoted as the champions of the 2023–24 National League 1 with no side being relegated the opposite way due to Jersey Reds going into liquidation in September 2023 and there only being eleven sides.

Club	Stadium	Capacity	Area	Previous season
Ampthill	Dillingham Park	3,000	Ampthill, Bedfordshire	7th
Bedford Blues	Goldington Road	5,000 (1,700 seats)	Bedford, Bedfordshire	4th
Caldy	Paton Field	4,000	Thurstaston, Wirral, Merseyside	10th
Cambridge	Grantchester Road	2,200 (200 seats)	Cambridge, Cambridgeshire	11th
Chinnor	Kingsey Road	2,500 (350 seats) (Note: Chinnor had a temporary 350 seater installed ahead of the 2024–25 season. Ground capacity adjusted from 2,000 to 2,500.)	Thame, Oxfordshire	Promoted from National 1 (champions)
Cornish Pirates	Mennaye Field	4,000 (2,200 seats)	Penzance, Cornwall	Runners up
Coventry	Butts Park Arena	5,250 (3,000 seats)	Coventry, West Midlands	3rd
Doncaster Knights	Castle Park	5,183 (1,926 seats)	Doncaster, South Yorkshire	6th
Ealing Trailfinders	Trailfinders Sports Ground	5,000 (2,115 seats)	West Ealing, London	Champions (not promoted)
Hartpury University	Hartpury Stadium	2,000	Hartpury, Gloucestershire	5th
London Scottish	Athletic Ground	4,500 (1,000 seats)	Richmond, London	9th
Nottingham	Lady Bay Sports Ground	3,700 (Note: Lady Bay capacity increased from 3,500 to 3,700 for the 2024–25 season.)	Nottingham, Nottinghamshire	8th

== Table ==
2024–25 RFU Championship table
Pos	Team	Pld	W	D	L	PF	PA	PD	TB	LB	Pts	Qualification
1	Ealing Trailfinders (C)	22	19	0	3	1114	419	+695	20	3	99	Not promoted
2	Bedford Blues	22	17	0	5	812	540	+272	17	1	86	
3	Doncaster Knights	22	15	0	7	662	479	+183	13	3	76	
4	Cornish Pirates	22	14	0	8	607	608	−1	13	3	72	
5	Coventry	22	13	0	9	704	593	+111	14	4	70	
6	Hartpury University	22	12	1	9	630	592	+38	14	3	67	
7	Nottingham	22	9	0	13	629	712	−83	13	6	55	
8	Ampthill	22	9	0	13	566	746	−180	12	5	53	
9	London Scottish	22	9	0	13	585	683	−98	12	3	51	
10	Chinnor	22	7	1	14	551	610	−59	8	5	43	
11	Caldy	22	4	0	18	437	674	−237	8	6	30	
12	Cambridge	22	3	0	19	485	1126	−641	9	0	21	

Updated to match(es) played on 31 May 2025. Source: Source: RFU Championship
Rules for classification: If teams are level at any stage, tiebreakers are applied in the following order:
1. Number of matches won
2. Number of matches drawn
3. Difference between points for and against
4. Total number of points for
5. Aggregate number of points scored in matches between tied teams
6. Number of matches won excluding the first match, then the second and so on until the tie is settled

== Fixtures & results ==
=== Round 1 ===
20 September 2024
19:45

London Scottish	19 – 45	Coventry (1 BP)

Athletic Ground
Attendance: 852
Referee: Hamish Grant

20 September 2024
19:45

(1 BP) Nottingham	18 – 24	Cornish Pirates (1 BP)

Lady Bay Sports Ground
Attendance: 935
Referee: Jack Makepeace

21 September 2024
14:30

(1 BP) Doncaster Knights	45 – 31	Ampthill (1 BP)

Castle Park
Attendance: 1,110
Referee: Mike Hudson

21 September 2024
15:00

(1 BP) Bedford Blues	45 – 19	Caldy

Goldington Road
Attendance: 2,012
Referee: Harry Walbaum

21 September 2024
15:00

(1 BP) Cambridge	24 – 57	Chinnor (1 BP)

Grantchester Road
Attendance: 1,497
Referee: Richard Gordon

21 September 2024
15:00

(1 BP) Ealing Trailfinders	55 – 21	Hartpury University

Trailfinders Sports Ground
Attendance: 850
Referee: Alex Thomas

=== Round 2 ===
27 September 2024
20:30

(1 BP) Cornish Pirates	24 – 29	Ealing Trailfinders (1 BP)

Mennaye Field
Attendance: 1,540
Referee: George Selwood

28 September 2024
14:30

Doncaster Knights	14 – 30	Nottingham (1 BP)

Castle Park
Attendance: 1,131
Referee: Andrew Wigley

28 September 2024
14:30

(1 BP) Hartpury University	34 – 33	London Scottish (2 BP)

Hartpury Stadium
Attendance: 1,034
Referee: Richard Gordon

28 September 2024
15:00

(1 BP) Ampthill	31 – 29	Chinnor (2 BP)

Dillingham Park
Attendance: 902
Referee: Harry Walbaum

28 September 2024
15:00

(1 BP) Coventry	45 – 7	Bedford Blues

Butts Park Arena
Attendance: 3,035
Referee: Hamish Smales

28 September 2024
15:00

(1 BP) Caldy	21 – 26	Cambridge

Paton Field
Attendance: 1,167
Referee: Joe James

=== Round 3 ===
4 October 2024
19:45

(1 BP) London Scottish	26 – 15	Cornish Pirates

Athletic Ground
Attendance: 991
Referee: Harry Walbaum

4 October 2024
19:45

(1 BP) Nottingham	38 – 14	Ampthill

Lady Bay Sports Ground
Attendance: 1,013
Referee: Jonathan Cook

5 October 2024
15:00

(1 BP) Bedford Blues	35 – 32	Hartpury University (2 BP)

Goldington Road
Attendance: 2,265
Referee: Hamish Grant

5 October 2024
15:00

Cambridge	19 – 36	Coventry (1 BP)

Grantchester Road
Attendance: 1,534
Referee: Alex Thomas

5 October 2024
15:00

(1 BP) Chinnor	31 – 17	Caldy

Kingsey Road
Attendance: 2,125
Referee: Andrew Jackson

5 October 2024
15:00

(2 BP) Ealing Trailfinders	35 – 36	Doncaster Knights (1 BP)

Trailfinders Sports Ground
Attendance: 1,012
Referee: Tom Foley

=== Round 4 ===
11 October 2024
19:45

(1 BP) Hartpury University	43 – 10	Cambridge

Hartpury Stadium
Attendance: 910
Referee: Joe James

11 October 2024
19:45

Nottingham	21 – 36	Ealing Trailfinders (1 BP)

Lady Bay Sports Ground
Attendance: 1,017
Referee: Mike Hudson

12 October 2024
14:00

(1 BP) Ampthill	33 – 19	Caldy

Dillingham Park
Attendance: 752
Referee: Richard Gordon

12 October 2024
14:30

(2 BP) Cornish Pirates	24 – 28	Bedford Blues (1 BP)

Mennaye Field
Attendance: 1,639
Referee: Andrew Wigley

12 October 2024
14:30

Doncaster Knights	0 – 12	London Scottish

Castle Park
Attendance: 1,058
Referee: Hamish Smales

12 October 2024
15:00

(1 BP) Coventry	28 – 14	Chinnor

Butts Park Arena
Attendance: 3,197
Referee: Joe James

=== Round 5 ===
18 October 2024
19:45

London Scottish	14 – 48	Nottingham (1 BP)

Athletic Ground
Attendance: 853
Referee: Sara Cox

19 October 2024
15:00

(1 BP) Bedford Blues	34 – 18	Doncaster Knights

Goldington Road
Attendance: 2,613
Referee: Joe James

19 October 2024
15:00

(1 BP) Caldy	15 – 17	Coventry

Paton Field
Attendance: 1,330
Referee: Ian Tempest

19 October 2024
15:00

(1 BP) Cambridge	29 – 22	Cornish Pirates (1 BP)

Grantchester Road
Attendance: 1,794
Referee: Charles Gayther

19 October 2024
15:00

Chinnor	19 – 34	Hartpury University (1 BP)

Kingsey Road
Attendance: 1,669
Referee: Dan Jones

19 October 2024
15:00

(1 BP) Ealing Trailfinders	92 – 0	Ampthill

Trailfinders Sports Ground
Attendance: 903
Referee: Alex Thomas

=== Round 6 ===
29 November 2024
19:30

Cornish Pirates	15 – 13	Chinnor (1 BP)

Mennaye Field
Attendance: 1,272
Referee: Alexander Thomas

29 November 2024
19:45

(1 BP) Nottingham	10 – 17	Bedford Blues

Lady Bay Sports Ground
Attendance: 1,157
Referee: Jack Makepeace

30 November 2024
13:30

(1 BP) Ampthill	21 – 27	Coventry (1 BP)

Dillingham Park
Attendance: 742
Referee: Charles Gayther

30 November 2024
14:30

(1 BP) Doncaster Knights	52 – 17	Cambridge

Castle Park
Attendance: 1,401
Referee: Jonathan Cook

30 November 2024
14:30

(1 BP) Hartpury University	40 – 24	Caldy (1 BP)

Hartpury Stadium
Attendance: 902
Referee: Mike Hudson

30 November 2024
15:00

(1 BP) Ealing Trailfinders	63 – 28	London Scottish (1 BP)

Trailfinders Sports Ground
Attendance: 1,072
Referee: Ian Tempest

=== Round 7 ===
7 December 2024
14:00

Caldy	3 – 22	Cornish Pirates

Paton Field
Attendance: 324
Referee: Jack Makepeace

7 December 2024
14:00

Cambridge	10 – 43	Nottingham (1 BP)

Grantchester Road
Attendance: 847
Referee: Hamish Grant

7 December 2024
15:00

Bedford Blues	17 – 25	Ealing Trailfinders

Goldington Road
Attendance: 1,981
Referee: Craig Maxwell-Keys

7 December 2024
15:00

Chinnor	18 – 13	Doncaster Knights (1 BP)

Kingsey Road
Attendance: 782
Referee: Mike Hudson

- Game abandoned in 68th minute, with Chinnor leading 18–13, due to power cut caused by adverse weather. The RFU would later rule the result a victory for Chinnor subject to appeal.

7 December 2024
15:00

Coventry	14 – 13	Hartpury University (1 BP)

Butts Park Arena
Attendance: 2,707
Referee: Sara Cox

7 December 2024
15:00

(1 BP) London Scottish	14 – 15	Ampthill

Athletic Ground
Attendance: 569
Referee: Richard Gordon

=== Round 8 ===
13 December 2024
19:45

Nottingham	19 – 14	Chinnor (1 BP)

Lady Bay Sports Ground
Attendance: 1,025
Referee: Andrew Jackson

14 December 2024
13:30

Ampthill	A – A	Hartpury University

Dillingham Park
Referee: Alex Thomas

- Game abandoned due to injury to referee. Game to be rescheduled for 11 January 2025.

14 December 2024
14:30

(1 BP) Cornish Pirates	46 – 14	Coventry

Mennaye Field
Attendance: 1,555
Referee: Harry Walbaum

14 December 2024
14:30

Doncaster Knights	22 – 0	Caldy

Castle Park
Attendance: 1,199
Referee: Craig Maxwell-Keys

14 December 2024
15:00

(1 BP) Ealing Trailfinders	95 – 7	Cambridge

Trailfinders Sports Ground
Attendance: 1,317
Referee: Andrew Wigley

15 December 2024
15:00

(1 BP) London Scottish	20 – 22	Bedford Blues

Athletic Ground
Attendance: 896
Referee: Jonathan Cook

=== Round 9 ===
21 December 2024
14:00

Caldy	20 – 10	London Scottish

Paton Field
Attendance: 1,735
Referee: Andrew Jackson

21 December 2024
14:00

Cambridge	13 – 7	Ampthill (1 BP)

Grantchester Road
Attendance: 1,520
Referee: George Selwood

21 December 2024
14:30

Hartpury University	21 – 7	Nottingham

Hartpury Stadium
Attendance: 670
Referee: Jamie Parr

21 December 2024
15:00

Chinnor	18 – 5	Bedford Blues

Kingsey Road
Attendance: 1,848
Referee: Joe James

21 December 2024
15:00

Coventry	25 – 35	Ealing Trailfinders (1 BP)

Butts Park Arena
Attendance: 4,523
Referee: Dan Jones

22 December 2024
14:30

Cornish Pirates	19 – 14	Doncaster Knights (1 BP)

Mennaye Field
Attendance: 1,766
Referee: Richard Gordon

=== Round 10 ===
28 December 2024
15:00

(1 BP) Bedford Blues	50 – 7	Cambridge

Goldington Road
Attendance: 5,000
Referee: Jonathan Cook

28 December 2024
15:00

(1 BP) Ealing Trailfinders	55 – 26	Caldy (1 BP)

Trailfinders Sports Ground
Attendance: 700
Referee: Alexander Thomas

28 December 2024
15:00

London Scottish	26 – 15	Chinnor

Athletic Ground
Attendance: 981
Referee: Jamie Parr

28 December 2024
15:00

(1 BP) Nottingham	41 – 26	Coventry (1 BP)

Lady Bay Sports Ground
Attendance: 1,925
Referee: Dan Jones

29 December 2024
13:30

Ampthill	17 – 33	Cornish Pirates (1 BP)

Dillingham Park
Attendance: 1,222
Referee: Charles Gayther

29 December 2024
14:30

(1 BP) Doncaster Knights	38 – 22	Hartpury University

Castle Park
Attendance: 1,595
Referee: Hamish Grant

=== Round 8 (rescheduled game) ===
11 January 2025
13:30

Ampthill	P – P	Hartpury University

Dillingham Park

- Game originally rescheduled from 14 December 2024 but postponed again due to frozen pitch. Game to be rescheduled for 1 March 2025.

=== Round 11 ===
17 January 2024
19:45

Chinnor	8 – 28	Ealing Trailfinders (1 BP)

Kingsey Road
Attendance: 2,146
Referee: George Selwood

18 January 2024
14:00

(1 BP) Caldy	27 – 22	Nottingham (1 BP)

Paton Field
Attendance: 1,850
Referee: Jack Makepeace

18 January 2024
14:00

(1 BP) Cambridge	26 – 48	London Scottish (1 BP)

Grantchester Road
Attendance: 984
Referee: Alexander Thomas

18 January 2024
14:30

(1 BP) Hartpury University	34 – 10	Cornish Pirates

Hartpury Stadium
Attendance: 1,000
Referee: Jonathan Cook

18 January 2025
15:00

(1 BP) Bedford Blues	45 – 24	Ampthill

Goldington Road
Attendance: 3,317
Referee: Richard Gordon

18 January 2024
15:00

Coventry	24 – 23	Doncaster Knights (1 BP)

Butts Park Arena
Attendance: 3,033
Referee: Craig Maxwell-Keys

=== Round 12 ===
24 January 2024
19:45

(1 BP) Bedford Blues	27 – 23	Coventry (1 BP)

Goldington Road
Attendance: 2,625
Referee: Luke Pearce

24 January 2024
19:45

(1 BP) Nottingham	43 – 18	Doncaster Knights

Lady Bay Sports Ground
Attendance: 1,444
Referee: Harry Walbaum

25 January 2024
14:00

(1 BP) Cambridge	27 – 41	Caldy (1 BP)

Grantchester Road
Attendance: 1,187
Referee: Hamish Smales

25 January 2024
14:00

(1 BP) London Scottish	39 – 14	Hartpury University

Athletic Ground
Attendance: 624
Referee: Richard Gordon

25 January 2024
15:00

Chinnor	19 – 32	Ampthill (1 BP)

Kingsey Road
Attendance: 1,255
Referee: Hamish Grant

25 January 2024
15:00

(1 BP) Ealing Trailfinders	84 – 29	Cornish Pirates (1 BP)

Trailfinders Sports Ground
Attendance: 2,712
Referee: Joe James

=== Round 8 (rescheduled game) ===
1 March 2025
14:00

(2 BP) Ampthill	32 – 36	Hartpury University (1 BP)

Dillingham Park
Attendance: 875
Referee: Richard Gordon

- Game originally rescheduled from 14 December 2024 and then rescheduled again from 11 January 2025.

=== Round 13 ===
21 March 2025
19:30

(1 BP) Cornish Pirates	41 – 31	London Scottish (1 BP)

Mennaye Field
Attendance: 1,288
Referee: George Selwood

22 March 2025
14:00

(1 BP) Ampthill	43 – 32	Nottingham (1 BP)

Dillingham Park
Attendance: 894
Referee: Jonathan Cook

22 March 2025
14:30

Doncaster Knights	20 – 18	Ealing Trailfinders (1 BP)

Castle Park
Attendance: 1,878
Referee: Craig Maxwell-Keys

22 March 2025
14:30

(1 BP) Hartpury University	29 – 26	Bedford Blues (2 BP)

Hartpury Stadium
Attendance: 1,020
Referee: Jack Makepeace

22 March 2025
15:00

(1 BP) Caldy	23 – 24	Chinnor

Paton Field
Attendance: 1,056
Referee: Harry Walbaum

22 March 2025
15:00

(1 BP) Coventry	43 – 33	Cambridge (1 BP)

Butts Park Arena
Attendance: 3,048
Referee: Dan Jones

=== Round 14 ===
29 March 2025
15:00

(1 BP) Bedford Blues	45 – 24	Cornish Pirates (1 BP)

Goldington Road
Attendance: 3,503
Referee: Charles Gayther

29 March 2025
15:00

(1 BP) Caldy	22 – 27	Ampthill (1 BP)

Paton Field
Attendance: 732
Referee: Hamish Smales

29 March 2025
15:00

Cambridge	19 – 33	Hartpury University (1 BP)

Grantchester Road
Attendance: 1,143
Referee: Andrew Wigley

29 March 2025
15:00

(1 BP) Chinnor	37 – 45	Coventry (1 BP)

Kingsey Road
Attendance: 2,142
Referee: Hamish Grant

29 March 2025
15:00

(1 BP) Ealing Trailfinders	82 – 5	Nottingham

Trailfinders Sports Ground
Attendance: 1,816
Referee: Alexander Thomas

29 March 2025
15:00

London Scottish	5 – 42	Doncaster Knights (1 BP)

Athletic Ground
Attendance: 926
Referee: Joe James

=== Round 15 ===
4 April 2025
19:45

(2 BP) Nottingham	28 – 33	London Scottish (1 BP)

Lady Bay Sports Ground
Attendance: 1,215
Referee: Henry Pearson

5 April 2025
14:30

(1 BP) Doncaster Knights	41 – 32	Bedford Blues (1 BP)

Castle Park
Attendance: 1,303
Referee: Craig Maxwell-Keys

5 April 2025
14:30

Hartpury University	17 – 17	Chinnor

Hartpury Stadium
Attendance: 682
Referee: George Selwood

5 April 2025
15:00

Ampthill	17 – 53	Ealing Trailfinders (1 BP)

Dillingham Park
Attendance: 1,400
Referee: Dan Jones

5 April 2025
15:00

(1 BP) Coventry	49 – 31	Caldy (1 BP)

Butts Park Arena
Attendance: 2,459
Referee: Jonathan Cook

6 April 2025
14:30

(1 BP) Cornish Pirates	64 – 35	Cambridge (1 BP)

Mennaye Field
Attendance: 1,512
Referee: Mike Hudson

=== Round 16 ===
12 April 2025
15:00

(1 BP) Bedford Blues	87 – 19	Nottingham

Goldington Road
Attendance: 2,998
Referee: Alexander Thomas

12 April 2025
15:00

Caldy	10 – 41	Hartpury University (1 BP)

Paton Field
Attendance: 895
Referee: Hamish Grant

12 April 2025
15:00

Cambridge	17 – 52	Doncaster Knights (1 BP)

Grantchester Road
Attendance: 1,512
Referee: Henry Pearson

12 April 2025
15:00

(2 BP) Chinnor	31 – 33	Cornish Pirates (1 BP)

Kingsey Road
Attendance: 1,867
Referee: Craig Maxwell-Keys

12 April 2025
15:00

(2 BP) Coventry	26 – 31	Ampthill (1 BP)

Butts Park Arena
Attendance: 3,002
Referee: Hamish Smales

12 April 2025
15:00

(1 BP) London Scottish	24 – 41	Ealing Trailfinders (1 BP)

Athletic Ground
Attendance: 1,042
Referee: Charles Gayther

=== Round 17 ===
19 April 2025
14:30

(1 BP) Cornish Pirates	27 – 24	Caldy (2 BP)

Mennaye Field
Attendance: 1,500
Referee: Andrew Wigley

19 April 2025
14:30

Doncaster Knights	38 – 14	Chinnor

Castle Park
Attendance: 1,145
Referee: Jamie Parr

19 April 2025
14:30

(1 BP) Hartpury University	31 – 24	Coventry (2 BP)

Hartpury Stadium
Attendance: 1,020
Referee: Richard Gordon

19 April 2025
15:00

(1 BP) Ampthill	38 – 19	London Scottish

Dillingham Park
Attendance: 811
Referee: Ben Wood

19 April 2025
15:00

(2 BP) Ealing Trailfinders	24 – 30	Bedford Blues (1 BP)

Trailfinders Sports Ground
Attendance: 1,274
Referee: Hamish Grant

20 April 2025
15:00

(1 BP) Nottingham	61 – 22	Cambridge

Lady Bay Sports Ground
Attendance: 1,145

=== Round 18 ===
2 May 2025
19:45

(1 BP) Chinnor	41 – 22	Nottingham (1 BP)

Kingsey Road
Attendance: 1,875
Referee: Joe James

3 May 2025
14:30

(1 BP) Hartpury University	38 – 14	Ampthill

Hartpury Stadium
Attendance: 865
Referee: Hamish Grant

3 May 2025
15:00

(1 BP) Bedford Blues	61 – 38	London Scottish (1 BP)

Goldington Road
Attendance: 3,011
Referee: Hamish Smales

3 May 2025
15:00

Caldy	15 – 33	Doncaster Knights (1 BP)

Paton Field
Attendance: 1,452
Referee: George Selwood

3 May 2025
15:00

Cambridge	19 – 89	Ealing Trailfinders (1 BP)

Grantchester Road
Attendance: 1,076
Referee: Ben Wood

3 May 2025
15:00

(1 BP) Coventry	14 – 21	Cornish Pirates

Butts Park Arena
Attendance: 3,204
Referee: Craig Maxwell-Keys

=== Round 19 ===
9 May 2025
19:45

(2 BP) Nottingham	29 – 34	Caldy (1 BP)

Lady Bay Sports Ground
Attendance: 1,151
Referee: Andrew Wigley

10 May 2025
14:30

(1 BP) Cornish Pirates	26 – 17	Hartpury University

Mennaye Field
Attendance: 1,387
Referee: Ben Simpson

10 May 2025
14:30

(1 BP) Doncaster Knights	38 – 24	Coventry

Castle Park
Attendance: 1,416
Referee: Richard Gordon

10 May 2025
15:00

(2 BP) Ampthill	33 – 36	Bedford Blues (1 BP)

Dillingham Park
Attendance: 2,104
Referee: Joe James

10 May 2025
15:00

(1 BP) Ealing Trailfinders	41 – 5	Chinnor

Trailfinders Sports Ground
Attendance: 922
Referee: Jonathan Cook

10 May 2025
15:00

(1 BP) London Scottish	60 – 33	Cambridge (1 BP)

Athletic Ground
Attendance: 1,406
Referee: Mike Hudson

=== Round 20 ===
17 May 2025
14:30

(1 BP) Cornish Pirates	38 – 33	Ampthill (2 BP)

Mennaye Field
Attendance: 1,518
Referee: Dan Jones

17 May 2025
15:00

Caldy	7 – 34	Ealing Trailfinders (1 BP)

Paton Field
Attendance: 1,678
Referee: Hamish Smales

17 May 2025
15:00

Cambridge	15 – 73	Bedford Blues (1 BP)

Grantchester Road
Attendance: 1,912
Referee: Ben Simpson

17 May 2025
15:00

(1 BP) Chinnor	19 – 24	London Scottish

Kingsey Road
Attendance: 2,056
Referee: George Selwood

17 May 2025
15:00

(1 BP) Coventry	67 – 5	Nottingham

Butts Park Arena
Attendance: 2,867
Referee: Andrew Jackson

18 May 2025
14:30

(2 BP) Hartpury University	35 – 41	Doncaster Knights (1 BP)

Hartpury Stadium
Attendance: 1,128
Referee: Charles Gayther

=== Round 21 ===
23 May 2025
19:45

(1 BP) Nottingham	54 – 33	Hartpury University (1 BP)

Lady Bay Sports Ground
Attendance: 1,446
Referee: Richard Gordon

24 May 2025
14:30

(1 BP) Doncaster Knights	35 – 12	Cornish Pirates

Castle Park
Attendance: 1,806
Referee: Hamish Grant

24 May 2025
15:00

(1 BP) Ampthill	54 – 43	Cambridge (1 BP)

Dillingham Park
Attendance: 745
Referee: Harry Walbaum

24 May 2025
15:00

(1 BP) Bedford Blues	61 – 26	Chinnor (1 BP)

Goldington Road
Attendance: 2,814
Referee: George Selwood

24 May 2025
15:00

(1 BP) Ealing Trailfinders	55 – 38	Coventry (1 BP)

Trailfinders Sports Ground
Attendance: 1,077
Referee: Craig Maxwell-Keys

24 May 2025
15:00

(1 BP) London Scottish	31 – 13	Caldy

Athletic Ground
Attendance: 674
Referee: Alexander Thomas

=== Round 22 ===
31 May 2025
15:00

Ampthill	19 – 29	Doncaster Knights (1 BP)

Dillingham Park
Attendance: 1,052
Referee: Alexander Thomas

31 May 2025
15:00

(2 BP) Caldy	26 – 29	Bedford Blues (1 BP)

Paton Field
Attendance: 2,101
Referee: Jonathan Cook

31 May 2025
15:00

(1 BP) Chinnor	82 – 34	Cambridge (1 BP)

Kingsey Road
Attendance: 1,954
Referee: Andrew Wigley

31 May 2025
15:00

(1 BP) Cornish Pirates	35 – 34	Nottingham (2 BP)

Mennaye Field
Attendance: 1,866
Referee: Jamie Parr

31 May 2025
15:00

(1 BP) Coventry	50 – 31	London Scottish (1 BP)

Butts Park Arena
Attendance: 3,168
Referee: Charles Gayther

31 May 2025
15:00

Hartpury University	12 – 45	Ealing Trailfinders (1 BP)

Hartpury Stadium
Attendance: 1,024
Referee: Mike Hudson

== Attendances ==
Club	Home Games	Total	Average	Highest	Lowest	% Capacity
Ampthill	11	11,499	1,045	2,104	742	35%
Bedford Blues	11	32,139	2,922	5,000	1,981	58%
Caldy	11	14,320	1,302	2,101	324	33%
Cambridge	11	15,006	1,364	1,912	847	62%
Chinnor	11	19,719	1,793	2,146	782	72%
Cornish Pirates	11	16,843	1,531	1,866	1,272	38%
Coventry	11	34,243	3,113	4,523	2,459	59%
Doncaster Knights	11	15,042	1,367	1,878	1,058	26%
Ealing Trailfinders	11	13,655	1,241	2,712	700	25%
Hartpury University	11	10,255	932	1,128	670	47%
London Scottish	11	9,814	892	1,406	569	20%
Nottingham	11	13,473	1,225	1,925	935	33%

== Leading scorers ==
Note: Flags to the left of player names indicate national team as has been defined under World Rugby eligibility rules, or primary nationality for players who have not yet earned international senior caps. Players may hold one or more non-WR nationalities.

=== Most points ===
As of 31 May 2025

Rank	Player	Club	Points
1	(England) William Maisey	Bedford Blues	238
2	(England) Harry Bazalgette	Hartpury University	202
3	(England) Joshua Barton	Ampthill	152
4	(Ireland) Bruce Houston	Cornish Pirates	136
5	(Wales) Daniel Jones	Ealing Trailfinders	130
6	(England) Thomas Mathews	Coventry	126
7	(Australia) Alex Dolly	Doncaster Knights	124
8	(England) Craig Willis	Ealing Trailfinders	120
9	(England) Matthew Arden	Nottingham	107
10	(England) Russell Bennett	Doncaster Knights	106

=== Most tries ===
As of 31 May 2025

Rank	Player	Club	Tries
1	(England) Dean Adamson	Bedford Blues	20
2	(England) Kehinde Olowofela	Doncaster Knights	19
3=	(England) Charles James-Carter	Chinnor	15
3=	(England) Ben Harris	Ealing Trailfinders	15
5	(Zimbabwe) Matthew McNab	Cornish Pirates	14
6=	(England) Ethan Hunt	Hartpury University	13
6=	(England) Tobi Wilson	Ealing Trailfinders	13
8=	(England) Benjamin Brownlie	Cambridge	12
8=	(England) Thomas Collins	Ealing Trailfinders	12
8=	(England) Matt Cornish	Ealing Trailfinders	12
8=	(England) Taiye Olowofela	Nottingham	12
8=	(Hong Kong) Matt Worley	Bedford Blues	12

== See also ==
- 2024–25 Premiership Rugby
- 2024–25 Premiership Rugby Cup
