= Jamie Jack =

English rugby union player

- Born: 8 September 1996 (age 30) Coventry, England
- Height: 1.78 m (5 ft 10 in)
- Weight: 115 kg (18.1 st; 254 lb)

Rugby union career
- Position: Prop
Senior career
Years	Team	Apps	(Points)
2018–2020	Nottingham	38	(0)
2020–2022	Ampthill	26	(5)
2022–2023	Edinburgh Rugby	3	(0)
- Correct as of 26 April 2023

Jamie Jack (born 8 September 1996) is an English rugby union player who plays for Bedford Blues in the RFU Championship.

== Career ==
Jack began his career playing for Nottingham, where he also served as academy coach. He joined Ampthill in 2020, before moving to Edinburgh during the latter part of the 2021–22 United Rugby Championship.
