= Sam Grahamslaw =

Scottish rugby union player

- Born: Samuel Alexander Grahamslaw; 24 February 1999 (age 27) Paris, France
- Height: 1.92 m (6 ft 4 in)
- Weight: 125 kg (276 lb; 19 st 10 lb)
- School: Wyggeston and Queen Elizabeth I College

Rugby union career
- Position: Loosehead prop
- Current team: Bristol Bears
Senior career
Years	Team	Apps	(Points)
2020–2022	Edinburgh Rugby	6	(0)
2022–2023	Jersey Reds	22	(15)
2023–present	Bristol Bears	12	(0)
- Correct as of 12 October 2023
International career
Years	Team	Apps	(Points)
2017	England U18		
2018–2019	Scotland U20	5	(0)
- Correct as of 20 May 2022

Sam Grahamslaw (born 24 February 1999) is a rugby union player who plays for Bristol Bears in the Gallagher Premiership. Grahamslaw's primary position is loosehead prop.

== Rugby Union career ==
=== Early career ===
Grahamslaw started playing his early rugby for Market Harborough RUFC, in Leicestershire, before selection for Leicester Tigers Elite Player Development Group. He joined Tigers under 18s academy in 2015, where he played as a back row. He joined Tigers Senior Academy in 2017, converting to his current position as a prop and was selected for England under 18s. He played for Scotland under 20s in the 2018 World Rugby Under 20 Championship and the 2019 Six Nations Under 20s Championship.

=== Professional career ===
Grahamslaw signed his first professional contract for Edinburgh Rugby in July 2020. He made his debut for Edinburgh in Round 5 of the 2020–21 Pro14 against Cardiff Blues.

Grahamslaw was released by Edinburgh at the conclusion of the 2021–22 United Rugby Championship season. He signed for Jersey Reds ahead of the 2022-23 RFU Championship season.

== Education ==
Grahamslaw studied at Loughborough University whilst playing for Leicester Tigers and Heriot-Watt University whilst playing for Edinburgh Rugby, graduating with a first class degree in Mechanical Engineering in the summer of 2022.
