= Joe Bedlow =

English rugby union player

- Born: Joseph Bedlow; 29 March 2002 (age 24) Bury, England
- Height: 1.88 m (6 ft 2 in)
- Weight: 97 kg (15 st 4 lb)
- School: Myerscough College
- Notable relative: Sam Bedlow (brother)

Rugby union career
- Position: Centre
Senior career
Years	Team	Apps	(Points)
2021–	Sale Sharks	12	(0)
2023–2024	→ Doncaster Knights (loan)	20	(5)
2024–	→ Caldy (loan)	4	(0)
- Correct as of 10 December 2024

Joe Bedlow (born 29 March 2002) is an English rugby union player who plays for Sale Sharks in the Gallagher Premiership.

Bedlow joined Sale Sharks academy straight from Myerscough College from a young age. His older brother Sam Bedlow also played for Sale Sharks and Bristol Bears in the Premiership. Bedlow first appeared for Sale in a Premiership Rugby Cup fixture against Newcastle Falcons at the AJ Bell Stadium in November 2021.

On 26 July 2023, Bedlow would join Doncaster Knights in the RFU Championship on a season-long loan for the 2023–24 season. He made his Doncaster debut against Championship rivals Ealing Trailfinders in another Premiership Rugby Cup fixture.

He has returned to Sale for the 2024–25 season, while also on loan for another Championship side Caldy where he made his first appearance against rivals Ampthill in the Championship in October 2024.
