= Oli Morris =

English rugby union player

- Born: 19 August 1999 (age 27) Chelmsford, England
- Height: 1.78 m (5 ft 10 in)
- Weight: 88 kg (13.9 st; 194 lb)
- Notable relative: Dom Morris (brother)

Rugby union career
- Position(s): Centre, Wing
Senior career
Years	Team	Apps	(Points)
2017–2019	Saracens	2	(0)
2018–2019	→ Ampthill (loan)	2	(0)
2019–2022	Worcester Warriors	34	(15)
2022–2023	Munster	0	(0)
- Correct as of 24 September 2022
International career
Years	Team	Apps	(Points)
- England U18
2019	Ireland U20	0	(0)

Oli Morris (born 19 August 1999) is an English-born, Irish-qualified rugby union player. He plays primarily as a centre, though he can also play as a winger.

== Career ==
=== Saracens ===
Morris' first professional club was Saracens, for whom he made two appearances in the Anglo-Welsh Cup as part of their youth setup. Whilst with Saracens, Morris was dual-registered with Ampthill and won National League 1 with the club during the 2018–19 season.

=== Worcester Warriors ===
Morris joined the Worcester Warriors academy ahead of the 2019–20, and signed his first senior contract with the club in February 2021. Worcester were placed into administration in September 2022.

=== Munster ===
Following Worcester's administration, Morris, who is Irish-qualified, joined United Rugby Championship club Munster on a contract until the end of the 2022–23 season, at which point he was released by the province.

== International ==
Morris represented England under-18s, but is also Irish-qualified through a grandmother, and was selected in the Ireland under-20s squad for the 2019 Six Nations Under 20s Championship, playing in friendlies for Leinster and Munster development teams against the under-20s in the build-up to the tournament.
