= Tom Dodd (rugby union) =

English rugby union player (born 1997)

- Born: Thomas Jack James Dodd; 28 October 1997 (age 29) Warwick, England
- Height: 1.91 m (6 ft 3 in)
- Weight: 109 kg (17 st 2 lb)
- School: Warwick School

Rugby union career
- Position: Flanker/Number 8
- Current team: Edinburgh Rugby
Senior career
Years	Team	Apps	(Points)
2017–2022	Worcester Warriors	28	(5)
2016–2017	→ Luctonians		
2017–2018	→ Birmingham Moseley		
2017–2018	→ Stourbridge		
2018–2019	→ Hartpury University	7	(0)
2022–2023	Coventry		
2023–	Edinburgh Rugby	9	(0)
- Correct as of 29 May 2024
International career
Years	Team	Apps	(Points)
2016	England Counties U18s	2	(0)
2016–2017	Scotland U20s	10	(20)
2024	Scotland A	1	(5)
- Correct as of 24 November 2024

Tom Dodd (born 28 October 1997) is an English-born Scottish rugby union player who currently plays for Edinburgh Rugby in the United Rugby Championship.

== Club career ==
Dodd joined the Worcester Warriors academy ahead of the 2016-17 season. He made his first-team debut in an Anglo-Welsh Cup clash against Sale Sharks at Sixways Stadium in November 2017. He went on to play three times in the 2017-18 season while he thoroughly impressed for Worcester Cavaliers in their Premiership Rugby Shield campaign, scoring three tries in all ten of the side's fixtures as they finished third in the Northern Conference.

Dodd also spent time with Luctonians during the 2016-17 season on a dual registered basis, before playing for Birmingham Moseley and Stourbridge in 2017-18 season. Dodd also helped Hartpury University to win 2016-17 National League 1 title, thus promoted to the RFU Championship from the 2017-18 season.

Dodd returned to action, following a knee surgery, in the European Rugby Challenge Cup victory over Enisei-STM in Russia in November 2019. His Premiership debut followed as a blood replacement for Sam Lewis against Northampton Saints at Sixways in March 2020.

On 21 January 2020, Dodd signed his first professional contract, which is a two-year deal until the end of summer of 2022, thus promoted to the senior squad from the 2020-21 season.

On 5 October 2022 all Worcester players had their contacts terminated due to the liquidation of the company to which they were contracted.

On 13 October 2022, Dodd signed for Coventry in the RFU Championship for the rest of the 2022-23 season.

== International career ==
He represented England Counties U18s against both France U18s and Ireland U18s at Ashbourne RFC near Ashbourne, County Meath in Ireland.

Dodd represented Scotland U20s through the 2017 Six Nations Under 20s Championship. He also helped them to a best-ever finish in the 2017 World Rugby Under 20 Championship, as they defeated Australia U20s to book a fifth-place finish in the tournament.
