= Henry Walker (rugby union) =

English rugby union player

- Born: Henry Patrick Walker; 10 March 1998 (age 28) Solihull, England
- Height: 1.78 m (5 ft 10 in)
- Weight: 106 kg (16 st 10 lb)
- School: Bromsgrove School

Rugby union career
- Position: Hooker
- Current team: Northampton Saints
Amateur team(s)
| Years | Team | Apps | (Points) |
- Old Shillians RFC
Senior career
| Years | Team | Apps | (Points) |
| 2016–2023 | Gloucester | 72 | (25) |
| 2017–2018 | → Hartpury University | 2 | (0) |
| 2023–2024 | Ealing Trailfinders | 12 | (30) |
| 2024– | Northampton Saints | 16 | (5) |
- Correct as of 25 May 2025
International career
| Years | Team | Apps | (Points) |
- England U16s
- England U17s
| 2017–2018 | England U20s | 15 | (5) |
- Correct as of 3 December 2020

Henry Walker (born 10 March 1998) is an English rugby union player who currently plays for Northampton Saints in the Premiership Rugby as a hooker.

He first played for Old Shillians RFC at age six. He has represented England U16s and U17s, captained at Bromsgrove School and won trophies in the U13 age group at the Millfield Sevens and the Rosslyn Park tournament. He also represented England U18s in a test series held in South Africa back in 2016.

Walker also represented England U20s in 2017 and earned a selection for the 2018 World Rugby Under 20 Championship. He made his debut for England U20 against Italy in February 2017

He made his debut for Gloucester against the Barbarians in 62-14 heavy loss held at Kingsholm Stadium in November 2015. On 14 February 2019, Walker signed his first professional contract for Gloucester, this promoted to the senior squad from the 2019–20 season.

On 23 June 2023, Walker signed for Ealing Trailfinders in the RFU Championship from the 2023–24 season. On 13 December 2024, he left the club with immediate effect to join Premiership rivals Northampton Saints from the 2024–25 season.
