= Harry Wilson (rugby union, born 1997) =

English rugby union player

- Born: 8 February 1997 (age 29) Gloucester
- Height: 1.96 m (6 ft 5 in)
- Weight: 120 kg (265 lb)
- University: Hartpury University

Rugby union career
- Position: Lock/Flanker
- Current team: Saracens
Senior career
Years	Team	Apps	(Points)
2016-2021	Gloucester Rugby	0	(0)
2021-2022	London Scottish	0	(0)
2022-2023	Ampthill	19	(10)
2023-2024	Doncaster Knights	22	(25)
2024-2026	Saracens	29	(5)
2026–	Exeter Chiefs	0	(0)

Harry Wilson (born 2 February 1997) is an English rugby union player who plays as a lock forward for Saracens.

== Early life ==
Wilson played for Cirencester RFC, and scored the winning try for England U17s against France U17s in 2014. He later captained Hartpury University to the BUCS Super Rugby title, and was part of their side which won three titles in four years. He played for the England national under-18 rugby union team and was part of the academy at Gloucester Rugby.

== Career ==
He played seven times in the RFU Championship for London Scottish during the 2021-2022 season, and joined Ampthill in August 2022.

He signed for Doncaster Knights in June 2023. Wilson was an ever-present for Doncaster Knights, and scored four tries, as they finished sixth in the Rugby Championship in the 2023-24 season, and he was named in the Championship Dream Team for the season. He signed for Premiership Rugby side Saracens in July 2024.

On 13 February 2026, Wilson would leave Saracens to join Premiership rivals Exeter Chiefs from the 2026-27 season on a two-year deal.
