= Tom Doughty (rugby union) =

English rugby union player (born 1996)

- Born: 22 November 1996 (age 29)
- Height: 202 cm (6 ft 8 in)
- Weight: 220 kg (485 lb)
- University: University of Bath

Rugby union career
- Position: Hooker
- Current team: Bristol Bears
Senior career
Years	Team	Apps	(Points)
2018-2023	Bath		
2023-2024	Doncaster Knights		
2024-	Bristol		

Tom Doughty (born 22 November 1996) is an English professional rugby union footballer who plays at Hooker for Premiership Rugby club Bristol Bears.

== Career ==
From Sussex, he captained Hove RFC prior to enrolling at the University of Bath, where he was captain of their first-XV in BUCS Super Rugby in 2018. Doughty made his Bath debut against Newcastle Falcons in 2018 and made his debut in the Premiership at home to Sale Sharks in 2021. He scored try's against Northampton Saints in the Premiership and against Gloucester in the Premiership Rugby Cup during the 2022-23 season.

After making a total of 24 appearances for Bath Rugby in four seasons, he joined RFU Championship side Doncaster Knights in 2023. After one season in the Championship, he signed for Premiership side Bristol Bears in April 2024.
