= Ioan Evans (rugby union) =

Welsh rugby union player

- Born: 18 July 2001 (age 25) Pontypridd, Wales
- Height: 1.78 m (5 ft 10 in)
- Weight: 90 kg (200 lb; 14 st 2 lb)

Rugby union career
- Position: Centre
Senior career
Years	Team	Apps	(Points)
2021	Cardiff	2	(0)
2025-	Pontypool RFC	2	(0)
- Correct as of 27 August 2025
International career
Years	Team	Apps	(Points)
2021	Wales U20	5	(0)
- Correct as of 11 December 2021

Ioan Evans (born 18 July 2001) is a Welsh rugby union player, currently playing for Super Rygbi Cymru side Pontypool RFC. His preferred position is centre.

== Cardiff ==
Evans was called into Cardiff's European squad ahead of their European campaign. He made his debut for Cardiff in the first round of the 2021–22 European Rugby Champions Cup against Toulouse coming on as a replacement.

== Pontypool ==
Evans signed for Pontypool RFC for the 25-26 season from Welsh Premiership Side Pontypridd RFC. Ioan made his Pontypool debut in a pre-season friendly against National League 1 side Dings Crusaders RFC impressing in a loss for the Welsh side.
