= Jack Metcalf (rugby union) =

English rugby union player (born 2001)

- Born: 20 April 2001 (age 25) Leeds, England
- Height: 1.90 m (6 ft 3 in)
- Weight: 94 kg (207 lb)
- School: Bishop Burton College

Rugby union career
- Position(s): Centre, Winger, Full-back
- Current team: Newcastle Falcons
Senior career
Years	Team	Apps	(Points)
2019-2020	Yorkshire Carnegie		
2021-2022	Sale Sharks		
2022-2023	Ealing Trailfinders		
2023	Eastwood		
2023-2024	Doncaster Knights		
2024-	Newcastle Falcons		

Jack Metcalf (born 20 April 2001) is an English rugby union footballer who plays as a centre for Rugby Premiership club Newcastle Falcons.

== Early life ==
From Leeds, he attended Bishop Burton College. He started playing rugby union at West Park Leeds. He also pursued football as a youngster, and played in the youth academy at Barnsley and Doncaster Rovers before focusing on rugby from the age of 17 years-old.

== Career ==
A versatile back, he has played at centre, wing and full-back. He started his professional rugby union career at Yorkshire Carnegie, making his debut in 2019, prior to playing at Rugby Premiership club Sale Sharks in 2021. He scored four tries in twelve appearances for Sale.

He had a spell at Eastwood Rugby Club in Australia. In England, he scored nine tries in twelve appearances for Ealing Trailfinders before joining fellow RFU Championship club Doncaster Knights. After scoring six tries for Doncaster Knights during the latter half of the 2023-24 season he signed for Rugby Premiership club Newcastle Falcons in June 2024 on a one-year contract. He made four appearances for Newcastle during the 2024-25 season.

He joined rugby league club Leeds Rhinos on a one-month trial in June 2025.
