= Nathan Chamberlain =

Scottish rugby union player

- Born: Nathan Chamberlain; 14 March 2000 (age 26)
- Height: 1.83 m (6 ft 0 in)
- Weight: 86 kg (13 st 8 lb)

Rugby union career
- Position: Fly-half
Senior career
Years	Team	Apps	(Points)
2018–2020	Hartpury University	3	(15)
2020–2022	Edinburgh Rugby	11	(47)
2022–	London Scottish	0	(0)
- Correct as of 29 September 2022
International career
Years	Team	Apps	(Points)
2019–2020	Scotland U20	11	(67)
- Correct as of 20 May 2022

Nathan Chamberlain (born 14 March 2000) is a Scottish rugby union player who plays for Hartpury University. He previously played for Edinburgh Rugby in the United Rugby Championship. Chamberlain's primary position is fly-half.

== Rugby Union career ==
=== Professional career ===
Chamberlain came through the Bristol Bears academy, and while studying at Hartpury College represented Hartpury University making 3 appearances, including a debut in the RFU Championship.

He joined Edinburgh Rugby ahead of the 2020–21 Pro14 season.

Chamberlain was released by Edinburgh Rugby at the conclusion of the 2021–22 United Rugby Championship season.

He signed for London Scottish on 5 August 2022.
