= Dafydd-Rhys Tiueti =

Welsh rugby player (born 2001)

- Born: 19 July 2001 (age 25) Neath, Wales
- Height: 1.86 m (6 ft 1 in)
- Weight: 105 kg (231 lb)
- University: Cardiff Metropolitan University
- Notable relative: Dave Tiueti

Rugby union career
- Position: Centre
- Current team: Coventry
Senior career
Years	Team	Apps	(Points)
2023-2024	Nottingham		
2024-	Coventry		

Dafydd-Rhys Tiueti (born 19 July 2001) is a Welsh professional rugby union footballer who plays as a centre for RFU Championship side Coventry RFC. He is the son of Dave Tiueti.

== Early and personal life ==
He was born in Neath, and is the son of Tongan former international rugby union player Dave Tiueti. He attended Cardiff Metropolitan University.

== Club career ==
He played for Nottingham R.F.C. in the RFU Championship in 2023–24 prior to signing for Coventry R.F.C. ahead of the 2024–25 season. He was named Coventry’s player of the month in October 2024.
