= Will Talbot-Davies =

English rugby union footballer

- Born: Will Talbot-Davies; 11 September 1997 (age 29) High Wycombe, England
- Height: 191 cm (6 ft 3 in)
- Weight: 96 kg (15 st 2 lb)

Rugby union career
- Current team: Retired Pro RFC
Senior career
Years	Team	Apps	(Points)
2016–2022	Dragons	35	(30)
2022–23	Coventry	25	(57)
2023–26	London Scottish	45	(20)
- Correct as of 6 November 2022
International career
Years	Team	Apps	(Points)
2017	Wales U20s	5	(0)
- Correct as of 6 November 2022
National sevens team
Years	Team		Comps
2017–2018	Wales		11

Will Talbot-Davies (born 11 September 1997) is a lawyer and ex-professional rugby union player who played for Wales, Dragons, Coventry and London Scottish as a fullback, centre or winger.

Talbot-Davies won multiple academic and sport scholarships, enabling him to attend Warwick Junior then Solihull Senior schools. He played football, golf, tennis, rugby and cricket at County, academy and National levels before progressing rugby through Warwickshire, Midlands, Welsh Exiles to Wales U18 and their subsequent tour to South Africa.

Pursuing a Law degree at Cardiff University, whilst there, he played for Wales U20 through their 6nations and then the U20s World Cup in Georgia. After he went on to the Senior 7s team travelling around the World Series through eleven tournaments, finishing at the San Francisco 7s World Cup in 2018. He also made his debut for the Dragons 1st team against Leicester in front of over 17,500 spectators in 2016 after being nurtured playing for their Academy, Bedwas and Ebbw Vale RFC.

The Covid pandemic and a serious double injury, playing Bordeaux in the European Champions Cup, halted progress. After a long rehabilitation and helping Newport to win the Welsh Cup, for the first time in a generation, Talbot-Davies recovered to finish the Dragons’ next season against Ulster and Munster.

In June 2022, Talbot-Davies returned home to play for his local club, Coventry RFC for the 2022-23 English Championship season, mentoring their young backs to their highest league position in the professional era. Then in June 2023 he moved to London to complete his legal training.

Talbot-Davies qualified as a Solicitor, specialising in Corporate and Commercial Law, with Russell-Cooke in London. He retired from professional rugby in 2026 to focus on applying his new skills to his love of all sports, transferring to specialist firm, Onside Law.
