= Karl Garside =

English rugby union player

- Born: Karl Garside; 4 February 1997 (age 29) Harlow, England
- Height: 6ft2 1.88 m (6 ft 2 in)
- Weight: 130 kg (20 st 7 lb; 287 lb)

Rugby union career
- Position: Tighthead Prop
- Current team: Sheffield Tigers
Senior career
Years	Team	Apps	(Points)
2018–2022	Northampton Saints	7	
2022-2024	Doncaster Knights		
2024-	Sheffield Tigers		
- Correct as of 31 January 2024

Karl Garside (born 4 February 1997) is an English now ex professional now semi professional rugby union player who plays as a prop for RFU National 2 North side Sheffield Tigers. He previously worked as a barman and a PE teacher.
