= Rhys Anstey =

Welsh rugby union player

- Born: Wales

Rugby union career
- Position: Lock
Senior career
Years	Team	Apps	(Points)
2021–	Cardiff	2	(0)
- Correct as of 11 December 2021

Rhys Anstey is a Welsh rugby union player, currently playing for Championship side Coventry on loan from Ealing Trailfinders. His preferred position is lock.

== Cardiff ==
Anstey was named in the Cardiff academy squad for the 2021–22 season. He made his debut for Cardiff in the first round of the 2021–22 European Rugby Champions Cup against Toulouse coming on as a replacement.
