= Harrison Courtney =

New Zealand rugby union player

- Born: 22 April 1997 (age 29)
- Height: 1.84 m (6 ft 0 in)
- Weight: 110 kg (17 st 5 lb)
- School: Hamilton Boys' High School
- University: Lincoln University

Rugby union career
- Position: Prop
- Current team: Edinburgh Rugby
Senior career
| Years | Team | Apps | (Points) |
| 2019 | Canterbury | 1 | (0) |
| 2021 | Warringah | 8 | (0) |
| 2021–2023 | Edinburgh Rugby | 9 | (0) |
| 2023 | → Watsonians | 2 | (5) |
- Correct as of 26 April 2023

Harrison Courtney is a New Zealand rugby union player who last played for Edinburgh Rugby in the United Rugby Championship.

== Rugby Union career ==
=== Professional career ===
Courtney represented Canterbury in the 2019 Mitre 10 Cup. He was named in the Edinburgh squad for their Round 6 match of the 2021–22 United Rugby Championship against the Dragons.
