= Ampthill RUFC =

English rugby union club, based in Ampthill, Bedfordshire

(England) Ampthill
- Full name: Ampthill RUFC
- Union: East Midlands RFU
- Founded: 1881; 145 years ago
- Ground: Dillingham Park (Capacity: 3,000)
- Director of Rugby: Mark Lavery
- Coach: Paul Turner
- Captain: Josh Barton
- League: Champ Rugby
- 2025–26: 10th of 14
Team kit

Official website
- ampthillrufc.com

Ampthill RUFC is an English rugby union club based in Ampthill, Bedfordshire. The club runs six senior teams and a full range of junior sides. The first XV play in Champ Rugby, the second tier of the English rugby union system. Ampthill women's team, the Lionesses, currently compete in the NC3 competition.

== History ==
In 2013–14, the team finished second but lost the promotion play-off to Darlington Mowden Park of the National League 2 North. In 2014–15, they again finished second having been transferred to National League 2 North. They beat Bishop's Stortford, the National League 2 South runner-up in the promotion play-off at Dillingham Park, 19–10.

For the 2015–16 season Ampthill have agreed a player development programme with Saracens, allowing young players contracted to Saracens to play for Ampthill.

== Honours ==
- East Midlands 1 champions: 1989–90
- Midlands 3 East (South) champions: 2006–07
- Midlands Division 2 East champions: 2008–09
- National League 3 Midlands champions: 2012–13
- East Midlands Wells Bombardier Cup winners (6): 1996, 1997, 2003, 2009, 2012, 2013
- National League 2 (north v south) promotion play-off winners: 2014–15
- National League 1 champions: 2018–19

Ampthill were initially National League 3 Midlands champions in 2009–10 but were stripped of the title due to breaches of league rules.

== Current standings ==
2026–27 Champ Rugby table
Pos	Team	Pld	W	D	L	PF	PA	PD	TF	TA	TB	LB	Pts	Qualification
1	Worcester Warriors	5	5	0	0	246	95	+151	37	14	4	0	24	Play-off semi-finals
2	Ealing Trailfinders	5	4	0	1	242	109	+133	38	16	4	1	21	Play-off semi-finals
3	Coventry	5	4	0	1	243	171	+72	36	26	2	1	19	Play-off quarter-finals
4	Rotherham Titans	5	4	0	1	160	191	−31	25	29	1	0	17	Play-off quarter-finals
5	Ampthill	5	4	0	1	195	195	0	29	29	0	0	16	Play-off quarter-finals
6	Cornish Pirates	5	3	0	2	182	187	−5	27	28	2	0	14	Play-off quarter-finals
7	Chinnor	5	3	0	2	180	183	−3	22	21	1	0	13	
8	Doncaster Knights	5	2	0	3	161	152	+9	24	21	1	2	11	
9	Bedford Blues	5	2	0	3	143	158	−15	22	24	2	1	11	
10	Blackheath	5	1	0	4	146	189	−43	20	27	0	3	7	
11	Caldy	5	1	0	4	176	206	−30	25	31	0	2	6	
12	Nottingham	5	1	0	4	128	206	−78	19	32	0	1	5	Relegation play-off
13	Hartpury	5	1	0	4	116	207	−91	16	31	0	1	5	Relegation play-off
14	Richmond	5	0	0	5	123	192	−69	19	29	0	1	1	Relegated

First match(es) will be played: 18 September 2026. Source:
Rules for classification: If teams are level at any stage, tiebreakers are applied in the following order:
1. Number of matches won
2. Number of matches drawn
3. Difference between points for and against
4. Total number of points for
5. Aggregate number of points scored in matches between tied teams
6. Number of matches won excluding the first match, then the second and so on until the tie is settled

== Current squad ==
The Ampthill squad for the 2025–26 season is:

Ampthill 2025–26 Cham Rugby squad
**Props**: (England) Richard Barrington; (New Zealand) Harrison Courtney; (England) Dom Hardman; (Samoa) **James Johnston**; (Scotland) Callum Norrie; (England) Jevaughn Warren; (Samoa) Tota Auva'a (Note: Saracens players who are dual-registered with the club for the 2025-26 season.); **Hookers**: (England) Harrison Dakin; (England) James Isaacs (Note: Saracens players who are dual-registered with the club for the 2025-26 season.); (England) Seb Smith; **Locks**: (England) Aaron Gear; (Australia) Aidan King; (Tonga) **Justin Mataele**; (England) Jake Parkinson	**Back row**: (Tonga) **Valentino Mapapalangi**; (England) Barney Merritt (Note: Saracens players who are dual-registered with the club for the 2025-26 season.); (England) Olly Mullarkey; (England) Matthew Perry; (Fiji) Lekima Ravuvu; (England) Charles Rylands; **Scrum-halves**: (England) Alex Davies; (Wales) Efan Jones; (Ireland) Rory Morgan; **Fly-halves**: (England) Josh Barton; (England) Louis Grimoldby; (England) Louie Johnson (Note: Saracens players who are dual-registered with the club for the 2025-26 season.)	**Centres**: (England) Olly Hartley (Note: Saracens players who are dual-registered with the club for the 2025-26 season.); (England) Matt Salisbury; (Scotland) Fraser Stratchan; (Tonga) Sione Venuku; (England) Oscar Wilson (Note: Saracens players who are dual-registered with the club for the 2025-26 season.); **Wings**: (Scotland) Mason Cullen; (Fiji) Seva Kava; (England) Sam Kildunne; (Wales) Rhys Thomas; **Fullbacks**: (England) Joe Heslop; (England) Albie Matthews
**(c)** denotes the team captain. (vc) denotes vice-captain. **Bold** denotes internationally capped players.^{ST} denotes a short-term signing. Source:
