= Jersey Reds =

Former rugby union club based in Jersey, Channel Islands

- Full name: Jersey Reds, formerly Jersey Rugby Football Club
- Union: Hampshire RFU
- Nickname: The Reds
- Founded: 1879; 147 years ago
- Disbanded: 28 September 2023; 3 years ago
- Location: Saint Peter, Jersey, Channel Islands
- Ground: Stade Santander International (capacity: 4,000 (200 seated)
- Chairman: Mark Morgan (since 2016)
- Director of Rugby: Harvey Biljon (Since 2014)
- Captain: Lewis Wynne
Team kit

Jersey Reds was a rugby union club based in Jersey, Channel Islands. On 28th September 2023, the club ceased trading and shortly thereafter went into liquidation following the withdrawal of financial support from a key investor.

Until season 2022/23, the professional arm of Jersey Reds was part of Jersey RFC, a members' club established in 1879 which also had an amateur men's side, Jersey Reds Athletic, who play in the National Leagues (tier 7); Jersey Reds Women, who play in the Women's National Championship South 2 league; and a thriving Mini section with over 500 boys and girls participating.

For the first season of the national leagues in England in 1987–88, Jersey were in London Three South-West (level 7), and did not play any higher until promotion in 2005.

Two professional players were signed in 2006 and gradually the club's 1st XV shifted towards full-time professionalism, which was introduced in 2013. By this time Jersey had been promoted four more times to reach, by 2012, the second level of the English pyramid, playing in the Greene King IPA Championship. During this period Jersey contested the knock-out competition for the four winners of the regional leagues at level 5 in 2009–10, defeating Taunton in the semi-final and then Ampthill in the final at Twickenham.

The team was known as Jersey Rugby Football Club until the start of the 2016–17 season, when they changed their name to the Jersey Reds. To reflect this, the team also adopted an all-red kit – jersey, shorts and socks.

Jersey Reds were the champions of the 2022–23 RFU Championship. Despite the 2022-23 season not having any promotion / relegation of teams across the leagues as Jersey Reds would have been ineligible due to insufficient stadium capacity.

== History ==
=== The beginnings ===
Rugby has been played in Jersey since 1879 with breaks for war and the Nazi occupation, but the modern era started when the club acquired the land for a permanent home in Saint Peter, near Jersey Airport, in 1961. The original wooden clubhouse was built in 1964 and its approximate location was in the middle of what is now the ‘Jersey Bowl’ carpark.

From the early 1970s, when tourism in the island was at its peak, Jersey attracted many of rugby's top clubs who could combine a break from their regular fixtures with a game against JRFC.

This period culminated with a very successful Centenary year in 1979, teams with international players came over to play and help celebrate this event, including J. P. R. Williams. This decade left the club with an unequalled collection of plaques and memorabilia, with teams coming from England, Scotland, Wales, Ireland, South Africa, Australia (the beachguard connection) and the Netherlands.

=== The National Leagues ===
The current clubhouse was opened in September 1994 and corresponded approximately with the start of the National Leagues in England. By then Jersey could no longer rely on random visiting sides playing friendlies and chose to join the league in Hampshire.

In the summer of 2010, the new Lord Jersey Stand was built between the 1st XV pitch and the Airport Road as was the Pavilion, with kitchen and bar, to the east of the main club facilities. This was to provide amenities for the increasing number of spectators due to the further success of the 1st XV.

The first team then worked its way up the National Leagues, winning the overall National League 3 in 2010 and progressing to National League 2 South. In 2011, Jersey were promoted to National League 1 through a play-off game at home to Loughborough Students. This was followed by promotion to the Championship at the end of the 2011/12 season.

The club had excellent attendances at St Peter during the 2011–12 National League 1 season including a club record crowd of 3,648 for a 20–18 win over Rosslyn Park on 25 January 2012.

=== The championship ===
The 2012/13 season was the club's first in the second tier of English rugby. The team struggled over the first couple of seasons but managed to avoid relegation. Following those difficult seasons, the club was able to establish itself as a solid member of the championship and delivered the following season-end positions:

2012/13 – 11th

2013/14 – 11th

2014/15 – 7th

2015/16 – 6th

2016/17 – 5th

2017/18 – 5th

2018/19 – 4th

2019/20 – 6th (season terminated early due to Covid pandemic)

2020/21 – 6th (short season again due to pandemic)

2021/22 - 4th (best finish with more wins and match-points than any other season)

2022/23 - 1st Champions

=== British and Irish Cup ===
Jersey first entered the competition in the 2012/13 season. Outstanding performances are as follows:

· 2015–16 Semi–final – lost 33–32 away to Yorkshire Carnegie

· 2016–17 Finalist – lost 29–28 away to Munster “A”

· 2017–18 Semi-final – lost 27–29 home to Leinster “A” (This was the last season of this competition).

=== Lions, Tigers, Sharks and Roses ===
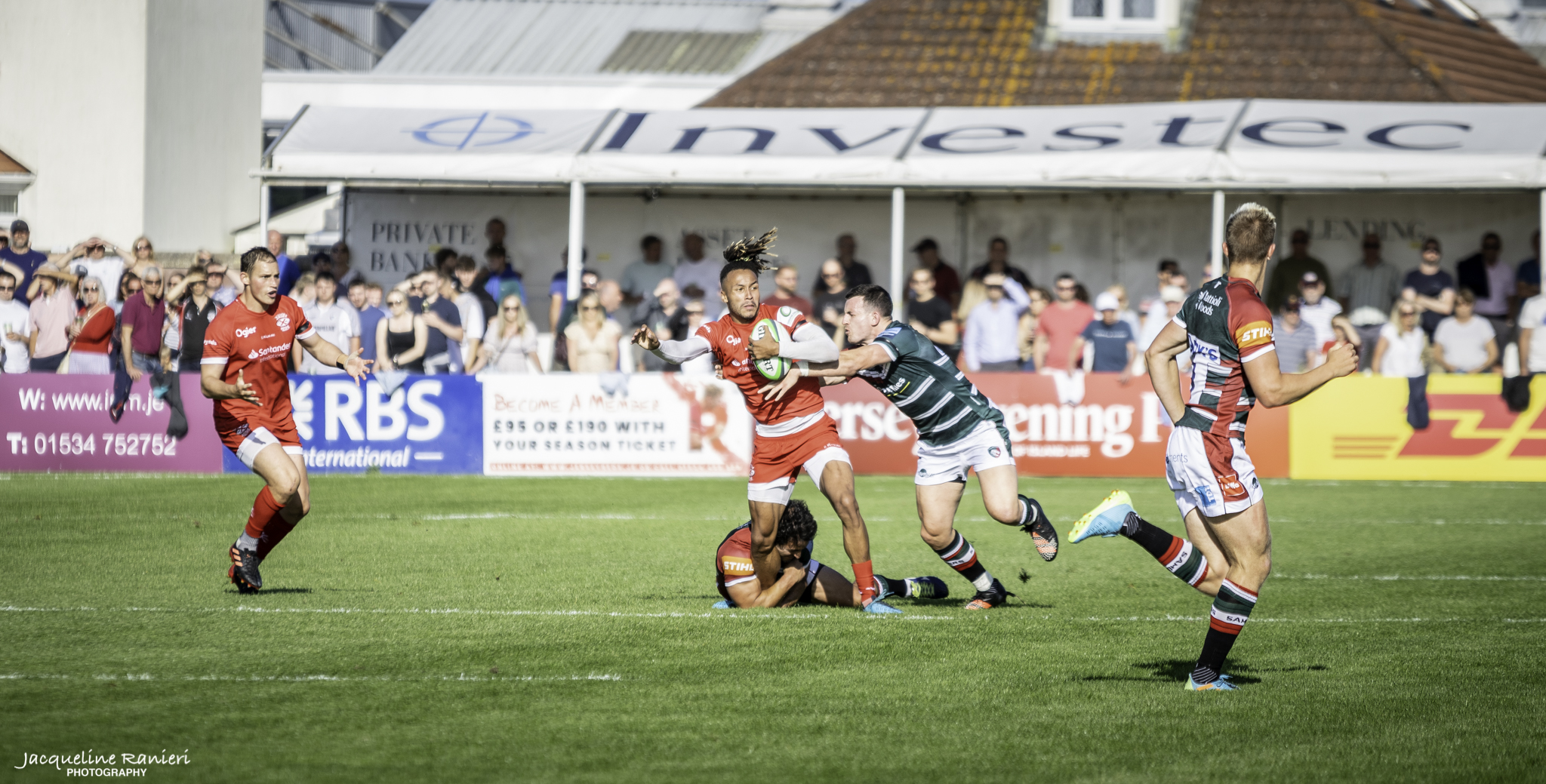
Jersey Reds hosted Leicester Tigers August 27th 2021

Jersey's reputation as a professional club has been instrumental in attracting major teams to the Island to help them prepare for upcoming matches.

In June 2021, the British and Irish Lions squad visited Jersey for 10 days as they prepared for their ill-fated tour to South Africa. As well as their regular training, two open sessions were held each of which saw some 1,500 local enthusiasts watching their heroes train.

This was followed by the visits of Leicester Tigers and Sale Sharks, each for a week of preseason work. Jersey Reds played both clubs on successive Fridays. They were beaten 7-17 b the Tigers and 0-19 by Sale.

Finally, Eddie Jones brought his England squad to the club during October 2021 as preparation for their successful Autumn International season where they beat Tonga, Australia and South Africa. Once again, the club hosted an open training session for 1,500 fans.

This trend continued in to 2022 when Leicester Tigers, London Irish and Bath Rugby all visited Jersey for training camps and all three played the Reds. While Jersey lost all three games, they were very competitive and the contests stood them in good stead for a great start to the 2022/23 season.

Eddie Jones also once again brought his England squad to the Reds facilities in preparation for the 2022 Autumn International series.

=== Demerging the clubs ===
Prior to the start of the 2022/23 season, the members of Jersey RFC voted to unanimously approve breaking-out the professional arm of the club. The aim was to free the old Amateur club of any incumberence professional rugby might bring and to also allow the professional team to seek new investment in to that section. RFU approval was given for the process and the emerging was enacted ahead of the 2022/23 season.

The pro-squad retained the Jersey Reds name and branding while the amateur club reverted to its original name of Jersey RFC.

=== Ceased trading 2023 ===
On 27 September 2023, the club announced that they had ceased trading and were likely to enter liquidation. The cause of the sudden announcement was reported as the withdrawal of an investor. The club had recently received £370,000 in grants from the Government of Jersey as financial assistance. The States Assembly held a lengthy debate on whether to provide further funding for the team but voted 30-13 against doing so, citing concerns over the club's financial viability. On 5 October 2023 the club announced that it would be entering liquidation. It was the fourth professional team to collapse in a year, following London Irish, Wasps and Worcester Warriors teams.

== Ground ==
Jersey played at the Stade Santander International which is adjacent to Jersey Airport.

== Honours (including JRFC) ==
- Siam Cup winners: 54 times
- Hampshire 1 champions (2): 1991–92, 1994–95
- London Division 3 South West champions: 2004–05
- London 2 (north v south) promotion playoff winners: 2007–08
- National League 3 London & SE champions: 2009–10
- National 3 Champions Cup winners: 2009–10
- National League 2 (north v south) promotion play-off winner: 2010–11
- National League 1 champions: 2011–12
- RFU Championship champions: 2022–23
