= Hartpury University R.F.C. =

English rugby union club, based in Hartpury

(England) Hartpury University
- Full name: Hartpury University Rugby Football Club
- Union: Gloucestershire RFU
- Founded: 2004; 22 years ago
- Location: Hartpury, Gloucestershire, England
- Ground: Hartpury Stadium (Capacity: 2,000)
- CEO: Daniel Bingham
- Coach: Mark Cornwell
- Captain: Will Crane
- League: Champ Rugby
- 2025–26: 6th of 14 (lost play-off quarter-final)
Team kit

Official website
- hartpury.ac.uk/rugby

Hartpury University RFC is an English rugby union club. The men's first team play in the second tier of the English rugby union league system, Champ Rugby, having won promotion from National League 1 at the end of the 2016–17 season.

The club is based at Hartpury University in Gloucestershire, England, and is made up primarily of the university's students and staff. Several Hartpury University players have gone on to play for Gloucester and other professional teams. They also jointly run Gloucester-Hartpury, who play in Premiership Women's Rugby, with Gloucester Rugby.

== History ==
Hartpury College Rugby Academy was formed in September 2000 in partnership with Gloucester Rugby, consisting of a university side that competed in the BUCS league system and under-18 teams. In 2004, the college's vision of a Saturday side came to fruition and became known as Hartpury College RFC.

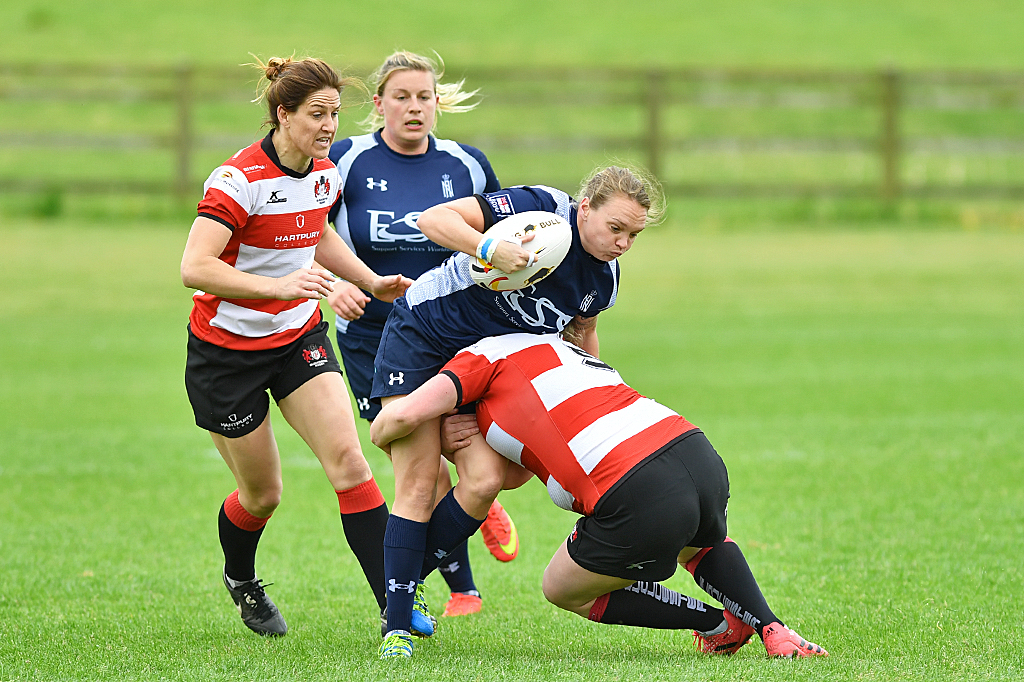
Women's rugby: Hartpury v Royal Navy match, May 2017

Starting in the eleventh tier of the league pyramid, Hartpury lost its first–ever match in the Gloucester Three North league. That was the last time that the club lost a league match until 2009, when they lost to Thornbury after four consecutive promotions, an EDF Junior Vase and an EDF Senior Vase. That setback did not prevent Hartpury from gaining further promotions to National League 1. During this time the team both the Level Six Champions Cup and EDF Intermediate Cup at Twickenham. In the 2016–17 season, their third at Level 3, Hartpury created history in winning National League 1 with a 100% record — winning all thirty of their fixtures and only twice failing to secure a four-try bonus point.

As a result, the club now plays in the Greene King IPA Championship. The first season saw them finish in 10th place, but comfortably clear of relegation. This finish continued Hartpury's remarkable record of having improved their final league position in every single year of their existence.

== Honours ==
- RFU Gloucester Three North champions: 2004–05
- RFU Gloucester Two champions: 2005–06
- RFU Gloucester One champions: 2006–07
- EDF Junior Vase winners: 2006–07
- RFU Gloucester Premier champions: 2007–08
- EDF Senior Vase winners: 2007–08
- Tribute Western Counties North champions: 2008–09
- EDF Intermediate Cup winners: 2008–09
- Tribute South West Division 1 West champions: 2009–10
- RFU Level Six Champions Cup winners: 2009–10
- National Division Three South West champions: 2010–11
- National Division Two South champions: 2013–14
- National League 1 champions: 2016–17

== Current standings ==
2026–27 Champ Rugby table
Pos	Team	Pld	W	D	L	PF	PA	PD	TF	TA	TB	LB	Pts	Qualification
1	Ealing Trailfinders	7	6	0	1	337	154	+183	53	23	6	1	31	Play-off semi-finals
2	Worcester Warriors	7	6	0	1	304	150	+154	47	22	4	0	28	Play-off semi-finals
3	Coventry	7	6	0	1	321	203	+118	48	31	3	1	28	Play-off quarter-finals
4	Chinnor	7	5	0	2	237	212	+25	37	33	2	0	22	Play-off quarter-finals
5	Rotherham Titans	7	5	0	2	209	255	−46	32	38	1	0	21	Play-off quarter-finals
6	Bedford Blues	7	4	0	3	228	206	+22	35	30	4	1	21	Play-off quarter-finals
7	Cornish Pirates	7	4	0	3	241	241	0	36	36	3	0	19	
8	Ampthill	7	4	0	3	229	278	−49	35	42	0	0	16	
9	Doncaster Knights	7	3	0	4	223	224	−1	33	33	1	2	15	
10	Richmond	7	2	0	5	191	240	−49	29	38	0	1	9	
11	Caldy	7	1	0	6	218	282	−64	33	43	0	3	7	
12	Blackheath	7	1	0	6	192	260	−68	25	39	0	3	7	Relegation play-off
13	Nottingham	7	1	0	6	169	255	−86	25	39	0	3	7	Relegation play-off
14	Hartpury	7	1	0	6	149	288	−139	21	44	0	1	5	Relegated

Updated to match(es) played on 8 November 2026. Source:
Rules for classification: If teams are level at any stage, tiebreakers are applied in the following order:
1. Number of matches won
2. Number of matches drawn
3. Difference between points for and against
4. Total number of points for
5. Aggregate number of points scored in matches between tied teams
6. Number of matches won excluding the first match, then the second and so on until the tie is settled

== Current squad ==
The Hartpury University squad for the 2025–26 season is:

Hartpury University 2025–26 Champ Rugby squad
**Props**: (England) George Alexander (Note: Gloucester players who are dual-registered with the club for the 2025-26 season.); (England) Harrison Bellamy (Note: Gloucester players who are dual-registered with the club for the 2025-26 season.); (Spain) Jono Benz-Salomon (Note: Gloucester players who are dual-registered with the club for the 2025-26 season.); (Wales) Rhys Davies; (England) Ales Gibson; (England) Tom Hill; (England) Archie McArthur (Note: Gloucester players who are dual-registered with the club for the 2025-26 season.); (England) Ollie Minnis; **Hookers**: (England) Will Crane; (England) Ethan Hunt; (Wales) Casey Williams; (England) Louie Trevitt (Note: Bristol Bears players who are dual-registered with the club for the 2025-26 season.); **Locks**: (England) Steele Barker (Note: Bristol Bears players who are dual-registered with the club for the 2025-26 season.); (Scotland) Cameron Cobbett; (England) Dale Lemon; (England) Freddie Ogden-Metherell (Note: Gloucester players who are dual-registered with the club for the 2025-26 season.); (England) Dan Owen; (England) Peter Paramore (Note: Gloucester players who are dual-registered with the club for the 2025-26 season.)	**Back row**: (Wales) Jack Davies; (England) Jay Evans; (England) Josh Gray; (Wales) Deian Gwynne (Note: Gloucester players who are dual-registered with the club for the 2025-26 season.); (Wales) Ellis Hart; (England) Jarrard Hayler; (England) Harry Short; (England) Freddie Stevens (Note: Gloucester players who are dual-registered with the club for the 2025-26 season.); (England) Tom Worts; **Scrum-halves**: (England) Sam Allford; (Wales) Cai Gealy (Note: Bristol Bears players who are dual-registered with the club for the 2025-26 season.); (Wales) Oscar Lennon (Note: Bristol Bears players who are dual-registered with the club for the 2025-26 season.); (England) Rhys Price (Note: Gloucester players who are dual-registered with the club for the 2025-26 season.); **Fly-halves**: (England) Ollie Allsopp; (England) Harry Bazalgette	**Centres**: (England) Ollie Holliday; (England) Max Knight (Note: Gloucester players who are dual-registered with the club for the 2025-26 season.); (England) Haydn Lewis; (England) Robbie Smith; **Wings**: (England) Keir Clark; (England) Jack Cotgreave (Note: Gloucester players who are dual-registered with the club for the 2025-26 season.); (England) Bradley Denty; (England) Josh Field; (England) Jacob Morris (Note: Gloucester players who are dual-registered with the club for the 2025-26 season.); **Fullbacks**: (Wales) Josh Carrington (Note: Bristol Bears players who are dual-registered with the club for the 2025-26 season.); (England) George Duffy; (Wales) Alex Morgan
**(c)** denotes the team captain. (vc) denotes vice-captain. **Bold** denotes internationally capped players.^{ST} denotes a short-term signing. Source:

== Notable former players ==
=== Gallagher Premiership ===
- Richard Barrington (Saracens)
- Callum Braley (Gloucester Rugby)
- Gareth Evans (Gloucester Rugby)
- Mat Gilbert (Bath Rugby)
- Dave Lewis (Harlequins)
- James Merriman (Bristol Bears)
- Ryan Mills (Worcester Warriors)
- Tom Savage (Gloucester Rugby)
- Ed Shervington (Worcester Warriors)
- Elliott Stooke (Bath Rugby)
- Henry Trinder (Gloucester Rugby)
- Ben Vellacott (Gloucester Rugby)
- Alex Wills (Sale Sharks)

=== Guinness Pro12 ===
- Callum Black (Ulster Rugby)
- Andries Pretorius (Cardiff Blues)

=== RFU Championship ===
- Dean Brooker (Cornish Pirates)
- Tom Calladine (Nottingham)
- Alex Dancer (Cornish Pirates)
- Matt Evans (Cornish Pirates)
- Tom Harrison (Plymouth Albion)
- Paul Jarvis (Doncaster Knights)
- Greg King (Moseley)
- Jordi Pasqualin (London Scottish)
- Tristan Roberts (Bristol Bears)

=== International ===
- Alex Cuthbert (Exeter Chiefs, Wales & British & Irish Lions)
- Ellis Genge (Bristol Bears, England & British & Irish Lions)
- Dafydd Jenkins (Exeter Chiefs & Wales)
- Jonny May (Gloucester Rugby & England)
- Sebastian Negri (Benetton Rugby & Italy)
- Dan Norton (England 7s)
- Jake Polledri (Gloucester Rugby & Italy)
- Louis Rees-Zammit (Bristol Bears, Wales & British & Irish Lions)
- Dan Robson (Wasps RFC & England)
- Charlie Sharples (Gloucester Rugby & England)
- Dan Tuohy (Ulster Rugby & Ireland)
- Dale Lemon (Zimbabwe)
