= List of 2021–22 Premiership Rugby transfers =

This is a list of player transfers involving Premiership Rugby teams before or during the 2021–22 season. The list is of deals that are confirmed and are either from or to a rugby union team in the Premiership during the 2020–21 season. It is not unknown for confirmed deals to be cancelled at a later date. On 20 June, Saracens were promoted to Premiership Rugby for the 2021–22 season after defeating Ealing Trailfinders in the RFU Championship promotion playoff. No team is relegated from the Premiership this season due to an increase in the number of teams in the Premiership for 2021–22 season.

== Bath ==
=== Players In ===
- (South Africa) Johannes Jonker from (England) Ealing Trailfinders
- (Scotland) D'Arcy Rae from (Scotland) Glasgow Warriors
- (England) Will Butt promoted from Academy
- (England) Arthur Cordwell promoted from Academy
- (England) Kieran Verden promoted from Academy
- (England) Richard de Carpentier unattached
- (England) Joe Simpson from (England) Gloucester (short-term loan)
- (Wales) Tom Prydie from (Wales) Scarlets (short-term deal)
- (South Africa) Jordan Venter from (Scotland) Edinburgh
- (Russia) Valery Morozov from (Russia) CSKA Moscow
- (England) Nathan Hughes from (England) Bristol Bears (season-long loan)
- (Tonga) Ma'afu Fia from (Wales) Ospreys (short-term loan)

=== Players Out ===
- (Scotland) Jamie Bhatti to (Scotland) Glasgow Warriors
- (England) Zach Mercer to (France) Montpellier
- (England) Christian Judge to (England) Worcester Warriors
- (England) Will Chudley to (England) Worcester Warriors
- (Wales) Rhys Priestland to (Wales) Cardiff
- (England) Elliott Stooke to (England) Wasps
- (England) Ross Batty retired
- (Scotland) Oli Cattell retired
- (Italy) Simone Elrick released
- (England) Tom Jeanes retired
- (England) Jack Walker to (England) Harlequins
- (England) Henry Thomas to (France) Montpellier
- (Italy) Sam Elrick to (Italy) Colorno
- (England) Xavier Hastings to (England) Hartpury University
- (Fiji) Josh Matavesi to (Japan) Toyota Industries Shuttles Aichi
- (England) Max Wright to (England) Newcastle Falcons (short-term loan)
- (England) Alex Gray to (England) Wasps
- (England) Max Green to (England) Bristol Bears (short-term loan)

== Bristol Bears ==
=== Players In ===
- (England) Tom Whiteley from (England) Saracens
- (England) Fitz Harding promoted from Academy
- (France) Antoine Frisch from (France) Rouen
- (England) Sam Jeffries unattached
- (England) Joe Cotton from (Australia) NSW Waratahs
- (Australia) Theo Strang from (Australia) Melbourne Rebels
- (England) Harry Ascherl promoted from Academy
- (England) Jack Bates promoted from Academy
- (England) George Kloska promoted from Academy
- (Wales) Ioan Lloyd promoted from Academy
- (England) Tom Wilstead promoted from Academy
- (England) Ashley Challenger from (England) Hartpury University
- (England) Max Green from (England) Bath (short-term loan)
- (England) Toby Venner from (England) Hartpury University (short-term loan)
- (England) Richard Lane from (England) Bedford Blues (short-term loan)
- (England) Oscar Lennon from (England) Hartpury University (short-term loan)
- (England) Sam Nixon from (England) Exeter Chiefs (season-long loan)

=== Players Out ===
- (Argentina) Nahuel Tetaz Chaparro to (Italy) Benetton
- (England) Tom Kessell to (England) Cornish Pirates
- (England) Ben Earl returned to (England) Saracens
- (Ireland) Stephen Kerins returned to (Ireland) Connacht
- (England) Max Malins returned to (England) Saracens
- (Ireland) Tadgh McElroy to (England) Ealing Trailfinders
- (England) Chris Cook to (England) Northampton Saints
- (Ireland) Peter McCabe to (England) Hartpury University
- (Tonga) Siale Piutau to (Japan) Shimizu Koto Blue Sharks
- (England) Nathan Hughes to (England) Hartpury University (short-term loan)
- (England) Nathan Hughes to (England) Bath (season-long loan)
- (England) Jake Armstrong to (Scotland) Edinburgh (short-term loan)
- (England) Alex Groves to (England) Sale Sharks

== Exeter Chiefs ==
=== Players In ===
- (New Zealand) Josh Iosefa-Scott from (New Zealand) Waikato
- (Ireland) Seán O'Brien from (Ireland) Connacht
- (Australia) Ryan McCauley from (Australia) Western Force (short-term deal)
- (England) Sam Nixon from (France) Bayonne
- (Argentina) Santiago Grondona from (England) Newcastle Falcons
- (England) Tom Hardwick from (France) SC Albi (short-term deal)

=== Players Out ===
- (Wales) Tomas Francis to (Wales) Ospreys
- (England) Barrie Karea to (France) Cognac Saint-Jean-d'Angély
- (Tonga) Elvis Taione to (Wales) Ospreys
- (England) James Short released
- (Wales) Alex Cuthbert to (Wales) Ospreys
- (England) Tom Price to (Wales) Scarlets
- (England) Joe Snow to (England) Coventry
- (Wales) Corey Baldwin to (Wales) Scarlets
- (England) Charlie Wright to (England) Taunton
- (England) Sam Nixon to (England) Bristol Bears (season-long loan)

== Gloucester ==
=== Players In ===
- (Scotland) Adam Hastings from (Scotland) Glasgow Warriors
- (England) Seb Nagle-Taylor from (England) Hartpury University
- (Scotland) Andrew Davidson from (Scotland) Edinburgh
- (Russia) Kirill Gotovtsev from (Russia) Krasny Yar Krasnoyarsk
- (England) Will Britton from (England) Doncaster Knights
- (Namibia) Wian Conradie from (United States) New England Free Jacks
- (England) Harry Elrington from (England) London Irish
- (Australia) Ben Meehan unattached
- (New Zealand) Matt Moulds from (England) Worcester Warriors (short-term deal)

=== Players Out ===
- (England) Matt Banahan retired
- (England) Willi Heinz to (England) Worcester Warriors
- (Scotland) Ollie Atkins released
- (England) Jamie Gibson released
- (England) Matt Garvey to (England) Worcester Warriors
- (Ireland) Conor Maguire to (England) Hartpury University
- (England) Ollie Adkins to (England) Hartpury University (season-long loan)
- (England) Josh Gray to (England) Hartpury University (season-long loan)
- (England) Joe Howard to (England) Hartpury University (season-long loan)
- (England) Ethan Hunt to (England) Hartpury University (season-long loan)
- (England) Matty Jones to (England) Hartpury University (season-long loan)
- (England) Cameron Jordan to (England) Hartpury University (season-long loan)
- (England) Toby Venner to (England) Hartpury University (season-long loan)
- (England) Tom Hudson to (England) Ampthill
- (England) Reece Dunn to (England) Ampthill (season-long loan)
- (England) Joe Simpson to (England) Saracens (short-term loan)
- (England) Joe Simpson to (England) Bath (short-term loan)
- Jack Reeves to (United States) New England Free Jacks (two-season loan)
- (England) Todd Gleave to (United States) Dallas Jackals
- (New Zealand) Matt Moulds to (United States) San Diego Legion
- (England) Charlie Sharples retired
- (Namibia) Wian Conradie to (United States) New England Free Jacks

== Harlequins ==
=== Players In ===
- (England) Louis Lynagh promoted from Academy
- (Ireland) Hayden Hyde from (Ireland) Ulster
- (England) Nick David from (England) Worcester Warriors
- (Italy) Tommaso Allan from (Italy) Benetton
- (Scotland) Huw Jones from (Scotland) Glasgow Warriors
- (England) Jack Walker from (England) Bath
- (England) Christian Scotland-Williamson unattached
- (Tonga) Viliami Taulani from (New Zealand) Chiefs

=== Players Out ===
- (Scotland) James Lang to (Scotland) Edinburgh
- (Scotland) Glen Young to (Scotland) Edinburgh
- (Wales) Scott Baldwin to (England) Worcester Warriors
- (England) Mike Brown to (England) Newcastle Falcons
- (Italy) Michele Campagnaro to (France) Colomiers
- (England) Brett Herron to (France) Biarritz
- (Argentina) Martín Landajo to (France) Perpignan
- (England) Nathan Earle to (England) Newcastle Falcons
- (Samoa) Elia Elia to (France) Bourg-en-Bresse
- (Fiji) Tevita Cavubati to (France) Perpignan
- (Australia) Ben Tapuai to (South Africa) Sharks
- (Scotland) Mak Wilson to (Scotland) Southern Knights (short-term loan)
- (United States) Paul Lasike to (United States) Utah Warriors

== Leicester Tigers ==
=== Players In ===
- (South Africa) Eli Snyman from (Italy) Benetton
- (South Africa) Marco van Staden from (South Africa) Bulls
- (South Africa) Francois van Wyk from (England) Northampton Saints
- (England) Freddie Burns from (Japan) Toyota Industries Shuttles Aichi
- (Argentina) Juan Pablo Socino from (England) Saracens
- (Australia) Bryce Hegarty from (Australia) Queensland Reds
- (England) Ollie Chessum promoted from Academy
- (Scotland) Cameron Henderson promoted from Academy
- (England) Dan Kelly promoted from Academy
- (England) George Martin promoted from Academy
- (England) Jack van Poortvliet promoted from Academy
- (England) Thom Smith promoted from Academy
- (England) Freddie Steward promoted from Academy
- (England) James Whitcombe promoted from Academy
- (England) Dan Richardson from Jersey Reds
- (England) Dan Lancaster from (England) Leeds Tykes
- (Tonga) Hosea Saumaki from (Japan) Yokohama Canon Eagles
- (England) Gareth Evans from (Wales) Ospreys (short-term deal)
- (England) Tom Cowan-Dickie from (England) Cornish Pirates
- (England) Olly Robinson from (Wales) Cardiff (season-long loan)
- (England) Chris Ashton from (England) Worcester Warriors (short-term deal)

=== Players Out ===
- (Argentina) Tomás Lavanini to (France) Clermont
- (South Africa) Luan de Bruin to (Scotland) Edinburgh
- (England) Zack Henry to (France) Pau
- (Ireland) Johnny McPhillips to (France) Carcassonne
- (England) Ollie Ashworth released
- (Ireland) Jordan Coghlan released
- (Scotland) Darryl Marfo released
- (England) Sam Lewis to (Italy) Calvisano
- (England) Ben White to (England) London Irish
- (England) Harry Simmons to Jersey Reds (season-long loan)
- (England) Sam Aspland-Robinson to (England) Coventry (season-long loan)
- (England) Osman Dimen to (England) Bedford Blues
- (England) Henri Lavin to (England) Loughborough Students
- (Argentina) Joaquín Díaz Bonilla to (South Africa) Sharks
- (England) Ryan Bower to (England) London Irish
- (England) Kit Smith to (England) Coventry
- (England) Joe Browning to (England) Nottingham (season-long loan)
- (England) Lewis Chessum to (England) Nottingham (season-long loan)
- (England) Jacob Cusick to (England) Nottingham (season-long loan)
- (England) Sam Edwards to (England) Nottingham (season-long loan)
- (England) Tim Hoyt to (England) Nottingham (season-long loan)
- (England) Archie Vanes to (England) Nottingham (season-long loan)
- (England) Jordan Olowofela to (Wales) Dragons (season-long loan)
- (England) George Worth to (Australia) Melbourne Rebels
- (England) Dan Richardson to (England) Coventry (short-term loan)
- (England) Gareth Evans retired
- (England) Thom Smith to (England) Doncaster Knights
- (South Africa) Cyle Brink to (South Africa) Bulls
- (England) Tom Cowan-Dickie to (England) Cornish Pirates (short-term loan)
- (South Africa) Kobus van Wyk released
- (England) Tom Youngs retired
- (England) Dan Lancaster to (England) Ealing Trailfinders

== London Irish ==
=== Players In ===
- (South Africa) Mike Willemse from (Scotland) Edinburgh
- (England) Ben White from (England) Leicester Tigers
- (South Africa) Benhard Janse van Rensburg from (Japan) Green Rockets Tokatsu
- (South Africa) Marcel van der Merwe from (France) La Rochelle
- (Ireland) Hugh O'Sullivan from (Ireland) Leinster
- (England) Rory Jennings from (France) Clermont
- (England) Ben Donnell promoted from Academy
- (Scotland) Kyle Rowe from (Scotland) Edinburgh
- (England) Ryan Bower from (England) Leicester Tigers (short-term deal)
- (Ireland) Jamie Dever from (United States) Old Glory DC (short-term deal)
- (England) Ciaran Parker from Jersey Reds
- (Ireland) Cillian Redmond from (Ireland) Lansdowne
- (Argentina) Juan Martín González from (Argentina) Jaguares XV
- Lucio Cinti from Argentina Sevens
- (Wales) Olly Cracknell from (Wales) Ospreys
- (England) Reece Marshall from (England) Northampton Saints (short-term loan)
- (Ireland) Tadgh McElroy from (England) Ealing Trailfinders (season-long loan)
- (South Africa) Alandré van Rooyen from (South Africa) Griquas
- (Ireland) Noel Reid from (France) Agen (short-term deal)
- (Italy) Giosuè Zilocchi from (Italy) Zebre Parma

=== Players Out ===
- (England) Tom Homer retired
- (England) Charlton Kerr released
- (Samoa) TJ Ioane to (France) Bourg-en-Bresse
- (Moldova) Andrei Mahu to (France) Perpignan
- (England) Harry Elrington to (England) Gloucester
- (New Zealand) Waisake Naholo to (New Zealand) Canterbury
- (Samoa) Motu Matu'u to (France) La Rochelle
- (South Africa) Nic Groom to (Israel) Tel Aviv Heat
- (Scotland) Blair Cowan to (Japan) Black Rams Tokyo
- (Russia) Vladimir Podrezov to (Russia) VVA Podmoskovye
- (England) Ryan Bower to (United States) Dallas Jackals

== Newcastle Falcons ==
=== Players In ===
- (England) Mike Brown from (England) Harlequins
- (England) Josh Basham promoted from Academy
- (England) Rob Farrar promoted from Academy
- (England) George Merrick from (England) Worcester Warriors
- (South Africa) Richard Palframan from (England) Worcester Warriors
- (Ireland) Conor Kenny from (Ireland) Connacht
- (Ireland) Matthew Dalton from (United States) Utah Warriors
- (England) Nathan Earle from (England) Harlequins
- Ollie Lindsay-Hague from England Sevens (short-term deal)
- (England) Max Wright from (England) Bath (short-term loan)

=== Players Out ===
- (Scotland) John Hardie retired
- (England) Bailey Ransom to (England) Bedford Blues
- (Ireland) Rodney Ah You to (France) Vannes
- (England) Toby Salmon to (France) Agen
- (England) Tom Arscott released
- (England) Mike Daniels released
- (Scotland) Jon Welsh released
- (Tonga) Cooper Vuna to (Romania) Tomitanii Constanța
- (England) Toby Flood retired
- (England) Sam Lockwood retired
- (Wales) Gareth Owen retired
- (Argentina) Santiago Grondona to (England) Exeter Chiefs
- (England) Mark Wilson retired
- (Fiji) Joel Matavesi to (England) Northampton Saints
- (England) Tom Marshall to (New Zealand) Green Island (short-term loan)

== Northampton Saints ==
=== Players In ===
- (England) Karl Wilkins from (France) Béziers
- (England) Tommy Freeman promoted from Academy
- (South Africa) Juarno Augustus from (South Africa) Stormers
- (Samoa) Brandon Nansen from (France) Brive
- (England) Chris Cook from (England) Bristol Bears (short-term deal)
- (Fiji) Frank Lomani from (Australia) Melbourne Rebels
- (South Africa) Courtnall Skosan from (South Africa) Lions
- (Ireland) Conor Carey from (France) Perpignan
- (Fiji) Joel Matavesi from (England) Newcastle Falcons (short-term deal)

=== Players Out ===
- (England) Lewis Bean to (Scotland) Glasgow Warriors
- (South Africa) Francois van Wyk to (England) Leicester Tigers
- (New Zealand) Owen Franks to (New Zealand) Hurricanes
- (South Africa) Shaun Adendorff to (France) Nevers
- (England) Reuben Bird-Tulloch to (England) Ealing Trailfinders
- (Fiji) Tui Uru to (England) Bedford Blues
- (England) Tommy Mathews to (England) Hartpury University
- (England) Ryan Olowofela to Jersey Reds
- (England) Henry Taylor retired
- (England) Jack Hughes to (England) Bedford Blues
- (England) Harry Mallinder to (Japan) Black Rams Tokyo
- (England) Samson Ma'asi retired
- (England) Jake Garside to (England) Bedford Blues (short-term loan)
- (Ireland) Oisín Heffernan to (England) Bedford Blues (short-term loan)
- (England) Emmanuel Iyogun to (England) Bedford Blues (short-term loan)
- (England) Nick Isiekwe returned to (England) Saracens
- (England) Reece Marshall to (England) London Irish (short-term loan)
- (England) Chris Cook to (Italy) Zebre Parma
- (Fiji) Frank Lomani to (Fiji) Fijian Drua
- (England) Dani Long-Martinez released

== Sale Sharks ==
=== Players In ===
- (England) Tommy Taylor from (England) Wasps
- (England) Simon McIntyre from (England) Wasps
- (South Africa) Nick Schonert from (England) Worcester Warriors
- (England) Alex Groves from (England) Bristol Bears
- (England) Dominic Barrow unattached

=== Players Out ===
- (Wales) WillGriff John to (Wales) Scarlets
- (England) Jake Cooper-Woolley released
- (Russia) Valery Morozov to (Russia) CSKA Moscow
- (Scotland) Ewan Ashman to (Scotland) Glasgow Warriors (season-long loan)
- (England) Denny Solomona to (New Zealand) Highlanders
- (England) James Phillips retired

== Saracens ==
=== Players In ===
- (United States) Ruben de Haas from (South Africa) Cheetahs
- (South Africa) Ivan van Zyl from (South Africa) Bulls
- (Italy) Marco Riccioni from (Italy) Benetton
- (Wales) Ethan Lewis from (Wales) Cardiff
- (Samoa) Theo McFarland from (Samoa) Moamoa Roosters
- (England) Ben Earl returned from (England) Bristol Bears
- (England) Ben Harris promoted from Academy
- (England) Nick Isiekwe returned from (England) Northampton Saints
- (England) Alex Lozowski returned from (France) Montpellier
- (England) Max Malins returned from (England) Bristol Bears
- (Wales) Sam Wainwright promoted from Academy
- (England) Joe Simpson from (England) Gloucester (short-term loan)
- (England) Ross Neal from (United States) Seattle Seawolves (short-term deal)
- (South Africa) Gareth Milasinovich from (Ireland) Ulster (short-term loan)
- (Wales) Alex Jeffries from (Wales) Scarlets (short-term loan)

=== Players Out ===
- (England) Tom Whiteley to (England) Bristol Bears
- (England) Ali Crossdale to (England) Wasps
- (England) Harry Sloan to (France) Agen
- (South Africa) Michael Rhodes released
- (Argentina) Juan Pablo Socino to (England) Leicester Tigers
- (England) Josh Ibuanokpe released
- (England) Calum Clark retired
- (England) Jonathan Kpoku to (England) Coventry
- (England) Alex Day to (England) Bedford Blues
- (England) Ethan Benson to (England) Richmond
- (United States) Will Hooley to (United States) San Diego Legion
- (England) Joel Kpoku to (France) Lyon

== Wasps ==
=== Players In ===
- (England) Elliot Millar-Mills from (England) Ealing Trailfinders
- (England) Ali Crossdale from (England) Saracens
- (South Africa) Francois Hougaard from (England) Worcester Warriors
- (England) Elliott Stooke from (England) Bath
- (Scotland) Robin Hislop from (England) Doncaster Knights
- (England) Dan Frost from (England) Cornish Pirates
- (England) Charlie Atkinson promoted from Academy
- (South Africa) Pieter Scholtz from (Wales) Scarlets
- (South Africa) Nizaam Carr from (South Africa) Bulls
- (New Zealand) Vaea Fifita from (New Zealand) Hurricanes
- (Scotland) Cameron Anderson promoted from Academy
- (England) Kieran Curran promoted from Academy
- (South Africa) Sebastian de Chaves from (United States) Austin Gilgronis (short-term deal)
- (Scotland) Patrick Harrison from (Scotland) Edinburgh (short-term loan)
- (Ireland) Alex McHenry from (Ireland) Munster (short-term loan)
- (England) Alex Gray from (England) Bath (short-term deal)
- (England) Tommy Mathews from (England) Hartpury University (short-term deal)
- (England) Will Holling from (England) Doncaster Knights (short-term loan)
- (Scotland) Gordon Reid from (Scotland) Marr (short-term deal)
- (Argentina) Rodrigo Martínez from (Paraguay) Olímpia Lions

=== Players Out ===
- (Wales) Will Rowlands to (Wales) Dragons
- (Scotland) Jack Owlett to (England) Worcester Warriors
- (New Zealand) Lima Sopoaga to (France) Lyon
- (England) Tommy Taylor to (England) Sale Sharks
- (Scotland) Ben Vellacott to (Scotland) Edinburgh
- (Tonga) Sione Vailanu to (England) Worcester Warriors
- (England) Kieran Brookes to (France) Toulon
- (South Africa) Juan de Jongh to (South Africa) Stormers
- (England) Callum Sirker to (England) Cornish Pirates
- (Georgia (country)) Zurabi Zhvania to (France) Grenoble
- (Georgia (country)) Lasha Jaiani to (Georgia (country)) The Black Lion
- (England) Simon McIntyre to (England) Sale Sharks
- (England) Zac Nearchou to (England) Ampthill (season-long loan)
- (England) Theo Vukašinović to (England) Ampthill (season-long loan)
- (England) Owain James to (England) Richmond
- (England) Will Simonds to (Australia) Manly (short-term loan)

== Worcester Warriors ==
=== Players In ===
- (Scotland) Duhan van der Merwe from (Scotland) Edinburgh
- (Scotland) Jack Owlett from (England) Wasps
- (England) Christian Judge from (England) Bath
- (England) Will Chudley from (England) Bath
- (England) Noah Heward promoted from Academy
- (Ireland) Oli Morris promoted from Academy
- (England) Willi Heinz from (England) Gloucester
- (Wales) Scott Baldwin from (England) Harlequins
- (Tonga) Sione Vailanu from (England) Wasps
- (Wales) Owen Williams from (Japan) NTT DoCoMo Red Hurricanes Osaka
- (Wales) Harri Doel from (Wales) Scarlets
- (England) Jack Johnson from (England) Hartpury University
- (England) Matt Garvey from (England) Gloucester
- (Scotland) Rory Sutherland from (Scotland) Edinburgh
- (Scotland) Murray McCallum from (Scotland) Glasgow Warriors

=== Players Out ===
- (Scotland) Duncan Weir to (Scotland) Glasgow Warriors
- (Scotland) Cornell du Preez to (France) Toulon
- (South Africa) Francois Hougaard to (England) Wasps
- (England) Nick David to (England) Harlequins
- (South Africa) Scott van Breda to Jersey Reds
- (England) Matt Cox retired
- (Ireland) Callum Black retired
- (England) George Merrick to (England) Newcastle Falcons
- (South Africa) Richard Palframan to (England) Newcastle Falcons
- (Ireland) Michael Heaney released
- (South Africa) Matti Williams released
- (Samoa) Ed Fidow to (New Zealand) Manawatu
- (New Zealand) Jono Kitto to (New Zealand) Canterbury
- (South Africa) Nick Schonert to (England) Sale Sharks
- (Ireland) Conor Carey to (France) Perpignan
- (England) Luke Baldwin to (England) Rosslyn Park
- (Zimbabwe) Marco Mama retired
- (Ireland) Caleb Montgomery to (England) Cornish Pirates (season-long loan)
- (England) Chris Pennell to (United States) Dallas Jackals
- (South Africa) GJ van Velze to (Israel) Tel Aviv Heat
- (New Zealand) Matt Moulds to (England) Gloucester
- (Namibia) Anton Bresler to (France) Racing 92
- (Wales) Scott Baldwin to (Wales) Ospreys
- (England) Chris Ashton to (England) Leicester Tigers
- (England) Willi Heinz released

== See also ==
- List of 2021–22 United Rugby Championship transfers
- List of 2021–22 RFU Championship transfers
- List of 2021–22 Super Rugby transfers
- List of 2021–22 Top 14 transfers
- List of 2021–22 Rugby Pro D2 transfers
- List of 2021–22 Major League Rugby transfers
