= List of 2021–22 RFU Championship transfers =

This is a list of player transfers involving RFU Championship teams before or during the 2021–22 season. The list is of deals that are confirmed and are either from or to a rugby union team in the Championship during the 2020–21 season. It is not unknown for confirmed deals to be cancelled at a later date. On 20 June, Saracens were promoted to Premiership Rugby for the 2021–22 season after defeating Ealing Trailfinders in the promotion playoff. No team is relegated from the Premiership this season due to an increase in the number of teams in the Premiership for 2021–22. Due to the COVID-19 pandemic there was also no National League 1 in 2020–21, so no sides are relegated/promoted to or from the division.

== Ampthill ==
=== Players In ===
- (England) Henry Trinder from (France) Vannes
- (England) Zac Nearchou from (England) Wasps (season-long loan)
- (England) Theo Vukašinović from (England) Wasps (season-long loan)
- (England) Tom Hudson from (England) Gloucester
- (England) Ewan Fenley from (England) Ealing Trailfinders (season-long loan)
- (England) Harry Seward from (England) Ealing Trailfinders (season-long loan)
- (England) Harry Jarvis promoted from Academy
- (England) Jack Dickinson from (England) Loughborough Students
- (England) Billy Harding from (France) Graulhet
- (Wales) Ben Cambriani from (Wales) Ospreys
- Cai Devine from Wales Sevens
- (England) Reece Dunn from (England) Gloucester (season-long loan)
- (Wales) Joe Goodchild from (Wales) Dragons
- (Ireland) Paddy Ryan from (England) Cornish Pirates
- (England) Josh Skelcey from (England) Plymouth Albion
- (England) Joe-Luca Smith from (England) London Scottish
- (Wales) Harri Morgan from (Wales) Ospreys (short-term loan)

=== Players Out ===
- (Wales) Syd Blackmore to (England) Cornish Pirates
- (England) James Flynn to Jersey Reds
- (Wales) Alex Humfrey to Jersey Reds
- (England) Will Brown to Jersey Reds
- (England) Sam Hudson to (England) Doncaster Knights
- (Switzerland) Jeremy To'a to (England) Plymouth Albion
- (England) Corey Lewis to (England) Cambridge
- (England) Craig Duncan to (England) Richmond
- (England) Kieran Frost to (England) Cambridge
- (England) Louis Grimoldby to (England) Bedford Blues
- (England) Suvwe Obano to (England) Nottingham
- (England) Sam Baker to (England) London Scottish
- (Tonga) David Halaifonua to (England) London Scottish
- (England) Matt Marsh to (England) Nottingham
- (England) Henry Trinder to (United States) Dallas Jackals

== Bedford Blues ==
=== Players In ===
- (Fiji) Tui Uru from (England) Northampton Saints
- (England) Josh Pieterse from (England) Ealing Trailfinders
- (England) Bailey Ransom from (England) Newcastle Falcons
- (England) Alex Woolford from (England) Coventry
- (England) Will Biggs from (England) Birmingham Moseley
- (England) Ollie Stedman from (England) Doncaster Knights
- (England) Osman Dimen from (England) Leicester Tigers
- (Ireland) Joey Conway from (Ireland) UL Bohemians
- (England) Alex Day from (England) Saracens
- (England) Luke Frost from (England) Nottingham
- (England) Dean Adamson from (France) Rouen
- (England) Jack Hughes from (England) Northampton Saints (short-term deal)
- (Wales) Robin Williams from (Wales) RGC 1404
- (England) Louis Grimoldby from (England) Ampthill
- (England) Frank Kelly from (England) Luctonians
- (England) Jake Garside from (England) Northampton Saints (short-term loan)
- (Ireland) Oisín Heffernan from (England) Northampton Saints (short-term loan)
- (England) Emmanuel Iyogun from (England) Northampton Saints (short-term loan)
- (England) Jamie Elliott from (Italy) Zebre Parma

=== Players Out ===
- (Ireland) Seán McCarthy retired
- (New Zealand) Elijah Niko to (France) Aurillac
- (England) Oli Curry retired
- (England) Henry Paul to (England) Doncaster Knights
- (England) Joe Wrafter to (England) Doncaster Knights
- (England) Joe Green to (England) Cambridge
- (England) Will Carrick-Smith to (England) Richmond
- (Ireland) James Lennon to (England) Richmond

== Cornish Pirates ==
=== Players In ===
- (Wales) Arwel Robson from (Wales) Dragons
- (Scotland) Ruaridh Dawson unattached
- (England) Tom Kessell from (England) Bristol Bears
- (England) Joe Elderkin from (England) Exeter University
- (England) Will Gibson from (Wales) Cardiff Metropolitan University
- (Wales) Ed Scragg from (Wales) Dragons
- (Wales) Carwyn Penny from (Wales) Dragons
- (Wales) Syd Blackmore from (England) Ampthill
- (England) Callum Sirker from (England) Wasps
- (England) Bear Williams from (England) Rosslyn Park
- (Ireland) Caleb Montgomery from (England) Worcester Warriors (season-long loan)
- (Wales) James Benjamin from (Wales) Dragons (short-term loan)
- (Wales) Garyn Phillips from (Wales) Ospreys (short-term loan)

=== Players Out ===
- (England) Dan Frost to (England) Wasps
- (Wales) Jean-Baptiste Bruzulier to (England) Hartpury University
- (Wales) Rhodri Davies released
- (Wales) Craig Mitchell retired
- (England) Will Cargill to (England) Sandbach
- (England) Harry Davey to (England) Doncaster Knights
- (Netherlands) Maliq Holden to (England) Doncaster Knights
- (Samoa) Fa'atiga Lemalu to (New Zealand) Manawatu
- (Ireland) Paddy Ryan to (England) Ampthill
- (England) Tom Cowan-Dickie to (England) Leicester Tigers (short-term loan)

== Coventry ==
=== Players In ===
- (England) Josh Bainbridge from Jersey Reds
- (Wales) Joe Jones from (England) Doncaster Knights
- (England) Jonathan Kpoku from (England) Saracens
- (England) Sam Aspland-Robinson from (England) Leicester Tigers (season-long loan)
- (England) Tom Griffiths from (Wales) Dragons (season-long loan)
- (England) Joe Snow from (England) Exeter Chiefs
- (England) Dan Richardson from (England) Leicester Tigers (short-term loan)
- (Wales) Dan Babos from (Wales) Dragons (short-term loan)

=== Players Out ===
- (England) Ben Nutley retired
- (England) Alex Woolford to (England) Bedford Blues
- (England) Alex Gibson to (England) London Scottish
- (England) Sam McNulty to (England) Birmingham Moseley
- (England) Keston Lines to (England) Chinnor
- (England) Kalius Hutchinson to (England) Birmingham Moseley
- (England) Henry Clement to (England) Plymouth Albion
- (Fiji) Andrew Bulumakau to (England) Birmingham Moseley

== Doncaster Knights ==
=== Players In ===
- (Argentina) Guido Volpi from (Wales) Ospreys
- (Wales) Connor Edwards from (Wales) Dragons
- (Australia) Alex Dolly from (England) Nottingham
- (England) Harry Davey from (England) Cornish Pirates
- (Netherlands) Maliq Holden from (England) Cornish Pirates
- (England) Henry Paul from (England) Bedford Blues
- (England) Joe Wrafter from (England) Bedford Blues
- (England) George Oram from (England) Richmond
- (Spain) Josh Peters from (France) Dijon
- (England) Joe Margetts from (Scotland) Ayrshire Bulls
- (England) Fraser Strachan from (England) Ealing Trailfinders
- (England) Joe Green from (England) Leeds Tykes
- (England) Sam Hudson from (England) Ampthill
- (England) Danny Drake from (Wales) Scarlets
- (Ireland) Ronan McCusker from (United States) New England Free Jacks
- (England) George Edgson from Jersey Reds
- (Wales) Ben Murphy from (Wales) Cardiff
- (England) Thom Smith from (England) Leicester Tigers

=== Players Out ===
- (Scotland) Robin Hislop to (England) Wasps
- (Ireland) Jerry Sexton to (France) Bourgoin-Jallieu
- (England) James Mitchell to Jersey Reds
- (Wales) Joe Jones to (England) Coventry
- (England) Will Britton to (England) Gloucester
- (England) Ollie Stedman to (England) Bedford Blues
- (England) Matt Challinor to (England) Rotherham Titans
- (England) Charlie Foley to (England) Hartpury University
- (England) Ben Hunter released
- (Ireland) Conor Joyce released
- (England) Sam Pocklington to (England) Rotherham Titans
- (England) Matt Smith to (England) Rotherham Titans
- (England) Harry Strong released
- (Ireland) James Newey to (England) Blackheath
- (England) Howard Packman to (England) Blackheath
- (Australia) James Kane to (England) Richmond

== Ealing Trailfinders ==
=== Players In ===
- (England) Reuben Bird-Tulloch from (England) Northampton Saints
- (Ireland) Cian Kelleher from (Ireland) Leinster
- (South Africa) Gary Porter from (South Africa) Ikey Tigers
- (Australia) Jack Digby from (Australia) Eastern Suburbs
- (Ireland) Stephen Kerins from (Ireland) Connacht
- (New Zealand) James Little from (New Zealand) North Harbour
- (New Zealand) Jimmy Roots from (New Zealand) North Harbour
- (Ireland) Bill Johnston from (Ireland) Ulster
- (Ireland) Tadgh McElroy from (England) Bristol Bears
- (South Africa) Jan-Henning Campher from (South Africa) Lions
- (South Africa) Len Massyn from (South Africa) Lions
- (South Africa) Dylan Smith from (France) Stade Français
- (South Africa) Jared Rees from (South Africa) Paarl Boys' High School

=== Players Out ===
- (England) Elliot Millar-Mills to (England) Wasps
- (South Africa) Johannes Jonker to (England) Bath
- (Scotland) Kieran Murphy retired
- (England) Guy Thompson to Jersey Reds
- (England) Nathan Fowles released
- (England) Josh Pieterse to (England) Bedford Blues
- (Scotland) Robert Beattie to (Scotland) Ayrshire Bulls
- (South Africa) Abongile Nonkontwana to (France) Bourgoin-Jallieu
- (England) Fraser Strachan to (England) Doncaster Knights
- (South Africa) Dean Hammond to (England) Chinnor
- (England) Jack Tovey to (England) Hartpury University
- (England) Oli Robinson to (England) Hartpury University
- (England) Ben West to (England) London Welsh
- (England) Jack Rouse to (England) Richmond
- (England) Ewan Fenley to (England) Ampthill (season-long loan)
- (England) Harry Seward to (England) Ampthill (season-long loan)
- (England) Levi Davis to (England) Birmingham Moseley
- (South Africa) Michael van Vuuren to (England) Chinnor
- (Ireland) Tadgh McElroy to (England) London Irish (season-long loan)
- (England) Arun Watkins to (England) Richmond
- (South Africa) Dylan Smith to (South Africa) Bulls

== Hartpury University ==
=== Players In ===
- (Wales) Jean-Baptiste Bruzulier from (England) Cornish Pirates
- (England) Tommy Mathews from (England) Northampton Saints
- (Ireland) Conor Maguire from (England) Gloucester
- (England) Xavier Hastings from (England) Bath
- (England) Jack Tovey from (England) Ealing Trailfinders
- (England) Charlie Foley from (England) Doncaster Knights
- (England) Oli Robinson from (England) Ealing Trailfinders
- (England) Harry Short promoted from Academy
- (England) Ollie Adkins from (England) Gloucester (season-long loan)
- (England) Josh Gray from (England) Gloucester (season-long loan)
- (England) Joe Howard from (England) Gloucester (season-long loan)
- (England) Ethan Hunt from (England) Gloucester (season-long loan)
- (England) Matty Jones from (England) Gloucester (season-long loan)
- (England) Cameron Jordan from (England) Gloucester (season-long loan)
- (England) Toby Venner from (England) Gloucester (season-long loan)
- (Ireland) Peter McCabe from (England) Bristol Bears

=== Players Out ===
- (England) Seb Nagle-Taylor to (England) Gloucester
- (Belgium) Ervin Muric to (France) Suresnes
- (England) Jack Johnson to (England) Worcester Warriors
- (England) Nick Selway to (England) London Scottish
- (England) Max Clementson to (England) Chinnor
- (England) Will Safe to (England) Birmingham Moseley
- (England) Ehize Ehizode to (England) London Scottish
- (England) Angus Southon to (England) London Scottish
- (England) Cam Roberts to (England) Esher
- (England) Tommy Mathews to (England) Wasps (short-term deal)
- (England) Ashley Challenger to (England) Bristol Bears
- (England) Toby Venner to (England) Bristol Bears (short-term loan)

== Jersey Reds ==
=== Players In ===
- (South Africa) Scott van Breda from (England) Worcester Warriors
- (England) Guy Thompson from (England) Ealing Trailfinders
- (England) James Flynn from (England) Ampthill
- (Wales) Alex Humfrey from (England) Ampthill
- (South Africa) Wesley White unattached
- (England) Will Brown from (England) Ampthill
- (South Africa) Jordan Holgate from (Russia) Slava Moscow
- (England) Will Lane from (England) Loughborough Students
- (England) James Mitchell from (England) Doncaster Knights
- (England) Ryan Olowofela from (England) Northampton Saints
- (England) Harry Simmons from (England) Leicester Tigers (season-long loan)
- (Wales) Huw Owen from (Wales) Pontypridd
- (Wales) Max Ayling from (Wales) Dragons
- (Scotland) Steven Longwell from (United States) Old Glory DC
- (Wales) Luke Yendle from (Wales) Dragons (short-term loan)
- (England) Tom Pittman from (Scotland) Boroughmuir Bears
- (Wales) Ioan Davies from (Wales) Dragons (short-term loan)
- (Wales) Alun Lawrence from (Wales) Cardiff (season-long loan)

=== Players Out ===
- (Namibia) Lesley Klim released
- (Tonga) Apakuki Ma'afu retired
- (Scotland) George Spencer released
- (Wales) Tom Williams retired
- (England) Dan Richardson to (England) Leicester Tigers
- (England) Josh Bainbridge to (England) Coventry
- (England) Ziana Alexis to (England) Cambridge
- (Wales) Rory Bartle to (Wales) Cardiff
- (England) Ollie Dawe to (England) Rosslyn Park
- (England) George Edgson to (England) Doncaster Knights
- (England) Ciaran Parker to (England) London Irish

== London Scottish ==
=== Players In ===
- (Scotland) Rory Hughes unattached
- (England) Alex Gibson from (England) Coventry
- (England) Maurice Nwakor from (England) Rosslyn Park
- (England) Tom Petty unattached
- (England) Will Routledge from (England) Leeds Beckett University
- (England) Nick Selway from (England) Hartpury University
- (England) Mark Cooke from (England) Blackheath
- (England) Laurence May from (England) Chinnor
- (Scotland) Dan Nutton from (Scotland) Edinburgh
- (England) Tom Baldwin from (England) Blackheath
- (Italy) Edoardo Bolacco from (England) Old Elthamians
- (England) Morgan Dawes from (England) Birmingham Moseley
- (England) Ehize Ehizode from (England) Hartpury University
- (England) Cameron King from (Wales) Cardiff Metropolitan University
- (England) Angus Southon from (England) Hartpury University
- (England) James Tyas from (England) Chinnor
- (England) Sam Baker from (England) Ampthill
- (England) Ben Charnock from (England) University of Warwick
- (England) Josh Drauniniu from (France) Albi
- (England) Leo Fielding from (England) Blackheath
- (Tonga) David Halaifonua from (England) Ampthill
- (Scotland) Aaron Purewal from (England) Richmond

=== Players Out ===
- (England) Ollie Adams released
- (England) Jordan Brodley released
- (Scotland) Phil Cringle released
- (England) Ryan Eveleigh released
- (South Africa) Jason Worrall to (England) Chinnor
- (Georgia (country)) Nodar Tcheishvili to (Georgia (country)) The Black Lion
- (Scotland) Sam Yawayawa to (England) Chinnor
- (England) Fred Tuilagi to (England) Chinnor
- (England) Toby Freeman to (England) Tonbridge Juddians
- (England) Luke Carter to (England) Chinnor
- (England) Jacob Perry released
- (Wales) Ryan Crowley to (England) Chinnor
- (England) Harry Morley to (England) Cambridge
- (England) Shek Sheriff to (England) Plymouth Albion
- (England) Mark Bright to (England) Richmond
- (England) Miles Wakeling to (England) Richmond
- (Wales) Matthew Davies released
- (England) Matt Eliet released
- (England) Joe-Luca Smith to (England) Ampthill

== Nottingham ==
=== Players In ===
- (South Africa) Storm Hanekom from (Wales) Dragons
- (England) Suvwe Obano from (England) Ampthill
- (England) Joe Browning from (England) Leicester Tigers (season-long loan)
- (England) Lewis Chessum from (England) Leicester Tigers (season-long loan)
- (England) Jacob Cusick from (England) Leicester Tigers (season-long loan)
- (England) Sam Edwards from (England) Leicester Tigers (season-long loan)
- (England) Tim Hoyt from (England) Leicester Tigers (season-long loan)
- (England) Archie Vanes from (England) Leicester Tigers (season-long loan)
- (England) Elliot Creed from (England) Birmingham Moseley
- (England) Elliot Bale from (France) Châteaurenard
- (England) Morgan Bunting from (England) Rotherham Titans
- (England) Matt Marsh from (England) Ampthill

=== Players Out ===
- (Australia) Alex Dolly to (England) Doncaster Knights
- (England) Luke Frost to (England) Bedford Blues
- (Ireland) Willie Ryan to (England) Chinnor
- (England) Tom Benjamin to (England) Birmingham Moseley
- (England) Ben Brownlie to (England) Cambridge
- (England) Alex Crocker to (England) Richmond

== Richmond ==
=== Players In ===
- (England) Ethan Benson from (England) Saracens
- (England) Mark Bright from (England) London Scottish
- (England) Alex Burrage from (England) University of Bath
- (England) Jared Cardew from (England) University of Exeter
- (England) Will Carrick-Smith from (England) Bedford Blues
- (England) Alex Crocker from (England) Nottingham
- (England) Craig Duncan from (England) Ampthill
- (England) Tom Ffitch from (England) Loughborough Students
- (England) Cameron Gray from (England) Chinnor
- (England) James Hadfield from (England) University of Bath
- (England) Will Homer from (Wales) Scarlets
- (England) Owain James from (England) Wasps
- (Ireland) James Lennon from (England) Bedford Blues
- (England) Zuriel Makele from (England) University of Nottingham
- (England) Edward Morgan from (England) Nottingham Trent University
- (South Africa) Ntinga Mpiko from (Ireland) Lansdowne
- (England) Jack Rouse from (England) Ealing Trailfinders
- (England) Miles Wakeling from (England) London Scottish
- (Australia) James Kane from (England) Doncaster Knights
- (England) Arun Watkins from (England) Ealing Trailfinders

=== Players Out ===
- (England) Alex Bibic retired
- (New Zealand) Rob Kirby retired
- (England) Jesse Liston retired
- (England) Tom Pashley retired
- (England) George Oram to (England) Doncaster Knights
- (Scotland) Aaron Purewal to (England) London Scottish

== See also ==
- List of 2021–22 Premiership Rugby transfers
- List of 2021–22 United Rugby Championship transfers
- List of 2021–22 Super Rugby transfers
- List of 2021–22 Top 14 transfers
- List of 2021–22 Rugby Pro D2 transfers
- List of 2021–22 Major League Rugby transfers
