= List of 2021–22 Major League Rugby transfers =

This is a list of player transfers involving Major League Rugby teams that occurred from the end of the 2021 season and through the 2022 season.

== Austin Gilgronis ==
=== Players in ===
- (United States) Brandon Asbel drafted
- (United States) Asa Carter drafted
- (United States) Caleb Strum drafted
- (United States) Marcel Brache from (Australia) Western Force
- (South Africa) Ryan Louwrens from (Japan) Hanazono Kintetsu Liners
- (Argentina) Julián Domínguez from (United States) New Orleans Gold
- (Australia) Luke Beauchamp from (United States) Houston SaberCats
- (Ireland) Mark O'Keeffe from (United States) Rugby ATL
- (New Zealand) Casey McDermott Vai from (United States) American Raptors

=== Players out ===
- (Ireland) Ned Hodson to (United States) Dallas Jackals
- (Chile) Marcelo Torrealba released
- (United States) Dom Bailey to (United States) Old Glory DC
- (Canada) Moe Abdelmonem to (United States) Dallas Jackals
- (Canada) Reegan O'Gorman to (United States) New England Free Jacks
- (New Zealand) Frank Halai released
- (Canada) Jeff Hassler released
- (United States) Nick Johnson released
- (United States) Paddy Ryan released
- (United States) Roderick Waters released

== Dallas Jackals ==
=== Players in ===
- (United States) DeCor Davis drafted
- (United States) Calvin Gentry drafted
- (United States) Aaron Gray drafted
- (United States) Eric Naposki drafted
- (Argentina) Alejandro Torres drafted
- (United States) Mike Matarazzo from (United States) Rugby ATL
- (United States) Bronson Teles from (United States) Houston SaberCats
- (England) Chris Pennell from (England) Worcester Warriors
- (Australia) Charlie McKill from (Australia) Warringah
- (Belgium) Jérémy Lenaerts from (United States) Houston SaberCats
- (England) Henry Trinder from (England) Ampthill
- (South Africa) Carlo de Nysschen from (United States) San Diego Legion
- (Ireland) Ned Hodson from (United States) Austin Gilgronis
- (United States) Nate Lyon from (United States) Austin Blacks
- (United States) Timothy Ohlwein from (United States) Arkansas State
- (United States) Tayé Olagunju from (United States) Georgia
- (United States) Alex Tucci from (United States) Utah Warriors
- (Canada) Liam Murray from (United States) Houston SaberCats
- (United States) Christian Adams unattached
- (United States) Ayemere Oiyemhonlan from (United States) St. Louis Bombers
- (England) Ryan Bower from (England) London Irish
- (Australia) Rory O'Connor from (Australia) Warringah
- (Canada) Dewald Kotze from (Canada) Pacific Pride
- (United States) Dylan James from (United States) LA Giltinis
- (England) Todd Gleave from (England) Gloucester
- (South Africa) Adriaan Carelse from (United States) Rugby ATL
- (United States) Tom Brusati from (United States) New England Free Jacks
- (United States) Campbell Johnstone from (United States) American Raptors
- (United States) Sam Phillips from (United States) American Raptors
- (United States) Chad London unattached
- (Argentina) Conrado Roura from (Uruguay) Peñarol
- (Canada) Moe Abdelmonem from (United States) Austin Gilgronis
- (United States) Shawn Clark from (United States) American Raptors
- (United States) Tommy Madaras from (United States) American Raptors
- (Namibia) Adriaan Booysen from (United States) Houston SaberCats

== Houston SaberCats ==
=== Players in ===
- (United States) Emmanuel Albert drafted
- (Zimbabwe) Tinashe Muchena drafted
- (United States) Dillon Shotwell drafted
- Danny Barrett from United States Sevens
- Matai Leuta from United States Sevens
- (South Africa) Willie Britz from (Japan) Shining Arcs Tokyo-Bay Urayasu
- (Fiji) Keni Nasoqeqe from (United States) San Diego Legion
- (South Africa) Dillon Smit from (South Africa) Lions
- (South Africa) Jaco Bezuidenhout from (South Africa) Blue Bulls
- Christian Dyer from United States Sevens
- (South Africa) David Coetzer from (South Africa) Bulls
- (South Africa) Kian Meadon from (South Africa) Sharks U21
- Maka Unufe from United States Sevens
- (South Africa) Louritz van der Schyff from (South Africa) Blue Bulls
- (South Africa) Gerrie Labuschagné from (South Africa) Pumas
- (United States) Siaosi Mahoni from (United States) San Diego Legion
- (South Africa) Marcell Muller from (South Africa) Free State Cheetahs
- (Argentina) Juan Pablo Zeiss from (Argentina) Jaguares XV
- (South Africa) Wynand Grassmann from (Russia) Slava Moscow
- (Argentina) Marcos Moroni from (Argentina) CUBA

=== Players out ===
- (Georgia (country)) Nika Khatiashvili to (Georgia (country)) The Black Lion
- (Uruguay) Diego Magno released
- (United States) Bronson Teles to (United States) Dallas Jackals
- (Belgium) Jérémy Lenaerts to (United States) Dallas Jackals
- (Canada) Liam Murray to (United States) Dallas Jackals
- (South Africa) Tiaan Erasmus to (United States) Rugby ATL
- (Australia) Luke Beauchamp to (United States) Austin Gilgronis
- (Australia) Sam Windsor to (United States) Rugby New York
- (Fiji) Paula Balekana to (United States) New England Free Jacks
- (South Korea) Jinho Mun released
- (Australia) De Wet Roos released
- (United States) Jeffrey Steele released
- (Argentina) Matías Freyre to (United States) San Diego Legion
- (Namibia) Adriaan Booysen to (United States) Dallas Jackals

== LA Giltinis ==
=== Players in ===
- (United States) Sam Klimkowski drafted
- (South Africa) Gerald Lowe drafted
- (Canada) James O'Neill drafted
- (Australia) Will Chambers from (Australia) Cronulla Sharks
- (Canada) Ben LeSage from (Canada) Toronto Arrows
- (Canada) Djustice Sears-Duru from (United States) Seattle Seawolves
- (Australia) Brooklyn Hardaker from (Australia) Randwick
- (Australia) Tas Smith from (Australia) Sydney University
- (Australia) Leslie Leuluaʻialiʻi-Makin from (Japan) Kurita Water Gush Akishima
- (United States) D'Montae Noble from (United States) Old Glory DC
- (Australia) Andrew Tuala from (Australia) NSW Waratahs
- (New Zealand) Jordan Trainor from (New Zealand) Auckland
- (United States) Hanco Germishuys from (United States) Rugby New York
- (United States) Joe Taufeteʻe from (France) Lyon

=== Players out ===
- (Australia) Adam Ashley-Cooper retired
- (Fiji) Serupepeli Vularika to (Fiji) Fijian Drua
- (South Africa) JP Smith to (South Africa) Lions
- (South Africa) Ruan Smith to (Australia) NSW Waratahs
- (Scotland) Glenn Bryce retired
- (United States) Dylan James to (United States) Dallas Jackals
- (Canada) James O'Neill to (Canada) Toronto Arrows
- (United States) Blake Rogers released
- (Ireland) Seán O'Brien returned to (Ireland) Leinster
- (United States) Pago Haini to (United States) Rugby New York

== New England Free Jacks ==
=== Players in ===
- (United States) Anthony Adamcheck drafted
- (United States) Zach Bastres drafted
- (Thailand) Cael Hodgson drafted
- (New Zealand) Jesse Parete from (Japan) Yokohama Canon Eagles
- (South Africa) Wayne van der Bank from (South Africa) Pumas
- (Canada) Foster DeWitt from (Canada) Pacific Pride
- (England) Jack Reeves from (England) Gloucester (two-season loan)
- (United States) Holden Yungert from (United States) New Orleans Gold
- (South Africa) Le Roux Malan from (South Africa) Ikey Tigers
- (United States) Mikaele Lomano from (United States) Sacramento Young Tigers
- (Netherlands) Stan van den Hoven from (New Zealand) Bay of Plenty
- (New Zealand) Slade McDowall from (New Zealand) Otago
- (New Zealand) Terrell Peita from (New Zealand) Auckland
- (New Zealand) Alex Johnston from (New Zealand) Te Puke
- (Tonga) Tevita Sole from (New Zealand) Bay of Plenty
- (United States) Javon Camp-Villalovos from (United States) Rhinos Rugby Academy
- (South Africa) Herman Agenbag from (South Africa) Falcons
- (New Zealand) Mills Sanerivi from (New Zealand) Taranaki
- (Canada) Reegan O'Gorman from (United States) Austin Gilgronis
- (Fiji) Paula Balekana from (United States) Houston SaberCats

=== Players out ===
- (Namibia) Wian Conradie to (England) Gloucester
- (Ireland) Ronan McCusker to (England) Doncaster Knights
- (Japan) Kensuke Hatakeyama to (Japan) Toyota Industries Shuttles Aichi
- (South Africa) Stephan Coetzee released
- (Fiji) Tuidraki Samusamuvodre to (Fiji) Fijian Drua
- (United States) Tom Brusati to (United States) Dallas Jackals
- (United States) Jackson Thiebes retired
- (Australia) Sef Fa'agase released
- (United States) Vili Tolutaʻu released
- (Fiji) Josateki Degei released
- (Ireland) Conor Kindregan released
- (New Zealand) Aleki Morris-Lome returned to (New Zealand) Otago
- (South Africa) Tera Mtembu released
- (Fiji) Poasa Waqanibau released
- (United States) Matt Wirken released
- (United States) Nick Hryekewicz to (United States) Old Glory DC

== New Orleans Gold ==
=== Players in ===
- (United States) Christian Alvarez drafted
- (United States) Carmen Consolino drafted
- (England) George Sharpe drafted
- (United States) Taylor Krumrei from (United States) Seattle Seawolves
- (United States) Chase Schor-Haskin from (United States) Rugby New York
- (United States) Devereaux Ferris from (United States) Seattle Seawolves
- (United States) Aaron Matthews from (United States) Seattle Seawolves
- Harley Wheeler from United States Sevens
- (Fiji) Maciu Koroi from (United States) Rugby ATL
- (United States) Paddy Ryan from (United States) Austin Gilgronis

=== Players out ===
- (Chile) Nikola Bursic released
- (United States) Kevin O'Connor retired
- (Canada) Kyle Baillie to (Canada) Toronto Arrows
- (United States) Holden Yungert to (United States) New England Free Jacks
- (Argentina) Julián Domínguez to (United States) Austin Gilgronis
- (South Africa) Hanno Dirksen to (Wales) Swansea
- (France) Timothée Guillimin to (France) Nîmes
- (United States) Giovanni Lapp released
- (United States) John Sullivan to (United States) Rugby ATL

== Old Glory DC ==
=== Players in ===
- (United States) Labi Koi-Larbi drafted
- (United States) Palema Roberts drafted
- (New Zealand) Junior Sa'u from (England) Leigh Centurions
- (Australia) Rohan Saifoloi from (Australia) Eastern Suburbs
- (Canada) Jake Ilnicki from (United States) Seattle Seawolves
- (United States) Rob Irimescu from (United States) Rugby New York
- (Samoa) William Talataina from (New Zealand) Ponsonby
- (United States) Dom Bailey from (United States) Austin Gilgronis
- (Ireland) Fintan Coleman from (Ireland) Young Munster
- (New Zealand) Felix Kalapu from (New Zealand) Auckland
- (New Zealand) Peni Lasaqa from (New Zealand) Bay of Plenty
- (New Zealand) Kyle Stewart from (New Zealand) Taranaki
- (United States) Thomas Capriotti from (United States) Penn State
- (United States) Michah Griffin from (United States) Washington Irish
- (United States) Nick Hryekewicz from (United States) New England Free Jacks
- (United States) John LeFevre from (United States) Northern Virginia
- (United States) Jack Russell from (United States) Northern Virginia

=== Players out ===
- (New Zealand) Jason Robertson to (France) Narbonne
- (Canada) Ciaran Hearn retired
- (Scotland) Mungo Mason to (England) Oxford University
- (Ireland) Jamie Dever to (England) London Irish
- (United States) Mike Sosene-Feagai to (France) Toulon
- (Scotland) Steven Longwell to Jersey Reds
- (United States) D'Montae Noble to (United States) LA Giltinis
- (United States) Sam Cusano released
- (United States) Sean Hartig released
- (Australia) James King released
- (United States) Max Lum released
- (United States) Casey Renaud released
- (New Zealand) Dylan Taikato-Simpson released

== Rugby ATL ==
=== Players in ===
- (United States) Sean Akins drafted
- (United States) Isaac Bales drafted
- (United States) Coleson Warner drafted
- (Ireland) Evan Mintern from (United States) Rugby New York
- (Ireland) Will Leonard from (United States) Rugby New York
- (South Africa) Tiaan Erasmus from (United States) Houston SaberCats
- (Argentina) Joaquín de la Vega Mendía from (Argentina) Hindú
- (South Africa) Justin Basson from (South Africa) Stormers
- (South Africa) John-Roy Jenkinson from (South Africa) Griquas
- (United States) John Sullivan from (United States) New Orleans Gold
- (Canada) George Barton from (United States) Seattle Seawolves
- (United States) Nolan Tuamoheloa from (United States) Pathway 404

=== Players out ===
- (Argentina) Bautista Ezcurra to (France) Grenoble
- (United States) Mike Matarazzo to (United States) Dallas Jackals
- (South Africa) Robbie Petzer to (South Africa) Pumas
- (New Zealand) Rory van Vugt returned to (New Zealand) Southland
- (Fiji) Manasa Saulo to (Fiji) Fijian Drua
- (South Africa) Adriaan Carelse to (United States) Dallas Jackals
- (Ireland) Mark O'Keeffe to (United States) Austin Gilgronis
- (United States) Chance Wenglewski to (United States) Rugby New York
- (Fiji) Maciu Koroi to (United States) New Orleans Gold
- (South Africa) Neethling Gericke retired
- (United States) Jeremy Misailegalu released

== Rugby New York ==
=== Players in ===
- (United States) Peter Reyes drafted
- (United States) Chase Schor-Haskin drafted
- Andrew Coe from Canada Sevens
- (Australia) Sam Windsor from (United States) Houston SaberCats
- (United States) Chance Wenglewski from (United States) Rugby ATL
- (New Zealand) Jason Emery from (New Zealand) Manawatu
- (New Zealand) Jack Heighton from (New Zealand) North Harbour
- (Samoa) Kalolo Tuiloma from (New Zealand) Counties Manukau
- (New Zealand) Nic Mayhew from (New Zealand) North Harbour
- (Samoa) Ed Fidow from (New Zealand) Manawatu
- (New Zealand) Brendon O'Connor from (New Zealand) Hawke's Bay
- (New Zealand) Will Tucker from (New Zealand) Otago
- (United States) Pago Haini from (United States) LA Giltinis
- (United States) Max Dacey from (United States) American Raptors
- (United States) Jonathan Grzeszczyk from (United States) White Plains
- (United States) John Powers from (United States) Utah Warriors
- (United States) Ishmail Shabazz from (New Zealand) Te Awamutu

=== Players out ===
- (England) Ben Foden retired
- (Fiji) Samu Tawake to (Fiji) Fijian Drua
- (New Zealand) Dan Hollinshead to (France) Vannes
- (Ireland) Evan Mintern to (United States) Rugby ATL
- (United States) Chase Schor-Haskin to (United States) New Orleans Gold
- (Ireland) Will Leonard to (United States) Rugby ATL
- (United States) Rob Irimescu to (United States) Old Glory DC
- (Australia) Harry Bennett retired
- (United States) Hanco Germishuys to (United States) LA Giltinis

== San Diego Legion ==
=== Players in ===
- (New Zealand) Ma'a Nonu from (France) Toulon
- (United States) Thomas Capriotti drafted
- (United States) Jonah Dietenberger drafted
- (United States) Dominick Iacovino drafted
- (United States) Will Hooley from (England) Saracens
- (Australia) Ben Grant from (Australia) Queensland Reds
- (South Africa) Hencus van Wyk from (South Africa) Free State Cheetahs
- (Australia) Rohan O'Regan from (Australia) Sydney University
- (Argentina) Matías Freyre from (United States) Houston SaberCats
- (Canada) Pat Lynott from (Canada) Toronto Arrows
- (New Zealand) Joe Walsh from (New Zealand) Southland
- (New Zealand) Matt Moulds from (England) Gloucester
- (New Zealand) Tomas Aoake from (New Zealand) North Harbour
- (Fiji) Jale Vakaloloma unattached
- (Canada) Jason Higgins from (Canada) Toronto Arrows
- Kainoa Lloyd from Canada Sevens

=== Players out ===
- (Fiji) Save Totovosau to (France) Narbonne
- (United States) Psalm Wooching to (France) Rouen
- (Ireland) Cronan Gleeson to (Romania) Tomitanii Constanța
- (Fiji) Jasa Veremalua to (Israel) Tel Aviv Heat
- (South Africa) Carlo de Nysschen to (United States) Dallas Jackals
- (Fiji) Keni Nasoqeqe to (United States) Houston SaberCats
- (Australia) Cam Clark to (Australia) Brumbies
- (United States) Dylan Audsley released
- (Italy) Joshua Furno released
- (United States) Siaosi Mahoni to (United States) Houston SaberCats
- (United States) Ethan McVeigh to (Wales) Cardiff Metropolitan University
- (Australia) Paddy Ryan returned to (Japan) Munakata Sanix Blues
- (United States) Thomas Capriotti to (United States) Old Glory DC
- (United States) Aaron Mitchell to (United States) Houston SaberCats
- (South Africa) Dean Muir to (United States) Houston SaberCats
- (United States) Fakaʻosi Pifeleti to (United States) Austin Gilgronis
- (United States) Cole Zarcone to (United States) Seattle Seawolves

== Seattle Seawolves ==
=== Players in ===
- (United States) Tavite Lopeti drafted
- (United States) Ethan Scott drafted
- (United States) Darell Williams drafted
- (South Africa) Dan Kriel from (South Africa) Lions
- (South Africa) Juan Mostert from (South Africa) Western Province U21
- (New Zealand) Sam Matenga from (New Zealand) Tasman
- (South Africa) Mzamo Majola from (South Africa) Sharks
- (South Africa) Duncan Matthews from (South Africa) Golden Lions
- Martin Iosefo from United States Sevens
- (Canada) Reid Watkins from (Canada) Toronto Arrows
- (United States) Mike Brown from (United States) Houston SaberCats
- (South Africa) Dewald Donald from (South Africa) Blue Bulls
- (United States) Alex Glover from (United States) Saint Mary's Gaels
- (United States) Tani Tupou from (United States) American Raptors
- (Chile) Augusto Böhme from (Chile) Selknam

=== Players out ===
- (United States) Shalom Suniula retired
- (Canada) George Barton released
- (United States) Andrew Durutalo to (England) Cambridge University
- (United States) Eric Duechle released
- (England) Ross Neal to (England) Saracens (short-term deal)
- (United States) Taylor Krumrei to (United States) New Orleans Gold
- (United States) Devereaux Ferris to (United States) New Orleans Gold
- (United States) Aaron Matthews to (United States) New Orleans Gold
- (Canada) Djustice Sears-Duru to (United States) LA Giltinis
- (Canada) Jake Ilnicki to (United States) Old Glory DC
- (South Africa) FP Pelser to (South Africa) Golden Lions
- (United States) Nick Taylor released
- (United States) Seta Tuilevuka released
- (Japan) Akihito Yamada returned to (Japan) Shining Arcs Tokyo-Bay Urayasu

== Toronto Arrows ==
=== Players in ===
- (England) Sam Mace drafted
- (Canada) Logan Martin-Feek drafted
- (Canada) Bryce Worden drafted
- (Canada) Kyle Baillie from (United States) New Orleans Gold
- (Canada) James O'Neill from (United States) LA Giltinis
- (New Zealand) Ueta Tufuga from (New Zealand) Wairarapa Bush
- (New Zealand) Isaac Salmon from (New Zealand) Tasman
- (Spain) Andrew Norton from (Spain) Aparejadores
- (New Zealand) Dennon Robinson-Bartlett from (New Zealand) Hawke's Bay
- Matthew Hood from Australia Sevens
- (Canada) Mitch Voralek from (Canada) Waterloo County
- (Canada) Brandan Ferguson from (Canada) Peterborough Pagans
- (Canada) Conor McCann from (Canada) Balmy Beach
- (Canada) Cole Brown from (Canada) Ajax Wanderers
- (New Zealand) Lolani Faleiva from (New Zealand) Hawke's Bay
- (Canada) Taitusi Vikilani from (Canada) Burnaby Lake
- (Canada) Brock Webster from (Canada) Pacific Pride

=== Players out ===
- (Uruguay) Leandro Leivas retired
- (Canada) Jamie Mackenzie retired
- (Canada) Ben LeSage to (United States) LA Giltinis
- (Argentina) Gaston Cortes released
- (New Zealand) Tayler Adams released
- (Uruguay) Manuel Diana released
- (Canada) Kolby Francis retired
- (Argentina) Manuel Montero released
- (Canada) Pat Parfrey released
- (Argentina) Joaquín Tuculet to (Argentina) Los Tilos
- (Canada) Pat Lynott to (United States) San Diego Legion
- (Canada) Reid Watkins to (United States) Seattle Seawolves
- (Canada) Jason Higgins to (United States) San Diego Legion

== Utah Warriors ==
=== Players in ===
- (United States) Joey Backe drafted
- (England) Connor Burns drafted
- (Canada) Emerson Prior drafted
- (New Zealand) Jamie Lane from (New Zealand) Auckland
- (New Zealand) Caleb Makene from (New Zealand) Highlanders
- (Ireland) Niall Saunders unattached
- (Fiji) Jone Vatuwaliwali from (Fiji) Ratu Kadavulevu School
- (United States) Taris Schramm from (United States) Utah Warriors Selects
- (United States) Carson Shoemaker from (United States) Utah Warriors Selects
- (United States) Tomasi Tonga from (United States) Utah Warriors Selects
- (United States) Paul Lasike from (England) Harlequins

=== Players out ===
- (Ireland) Matthew Dalton to (England) Newcastle Falcons
- (South Africa) Aston Fortuin to (France) Narbonne
- (United States) Matt Jensen retired
- (Canada) Fraser Hurst released
- (Canada) Hank Stevenson released
- (United States) Alex Tucci to (United States) Dallas Jackals
- (Tonga) Tonati Lauti released
- (Australia) Sama Malolo released
- (Germany) Hagen Schulte retired
- (United States) Josh Whippy released
- (United States) Michael Baska to (France) Rouen

== See also ==
- List of 2021–22 Premiership Rugby transfers
- List of 2021–22 RFU Championship transfers
- List of 2021–22 Super Rugby transfers
- List of 2021–22 United Rugby Championship transfers
- List of 2021–22 Top 14 transfers
- List of 2021–22 Rugby Pro D2 transfers
