= List of 2021–22 Rugby Pro D2 transfers =

This is a list of player transfers involving Rugby Pro D2 teams before or during the 2021–22 season. The list is of deals that are confirmed and are either from or to a rugby union team in the Pro D2 during the 2020–21 season. It is not unknown for confirmed deals to be cancelled at a later date. Perpignan were promoted to the Top 14 having won the 2020–21 Rugby Pro D2 whilst Agen were relegated from the Top 14. Biarritz then defeated Bayonne in the promotion-relegation decider, meaning Biarritz were promoted, and Bayonne relegated. Bourg-en-Bresse and Narbonne were promoted to the Pro D2 having finished 1st and 2nd in the 2020–21 Championnat Fédéral Nationale, whilst Soyaux Angoulême and Valence Romans were relegated to the Nationale competition for the 2021–22 season.

== Agen ==
=== Players In ===
- (Georgia (country)) Grigor Kerdikoshvili from (Georgia (country)) Lelo Saracens
- (Georgia (country)) Jaba Bregvadze unattached
- (France) Paul Graou from (France) Montauban
- (Fiji) Kolinio Ramoka from (France) Cognac Saint-Jean-d'Angély
- (France) Florent Guion from (France) Rouen
- (France) Iban Etcheverry from (France) Soyaux Angoulême
- (France) Arnaud Duputs from (France) Bayonne
- (England) Harry Sloan from (England) Saracens
- (Tonga) Fotu Lokotui from (Scotland) Glasgow Warriors
- (France) William Demotte from (France) Grenoble
- (France) Matthieu Bonnet from (France) Blagnac
- (France) Théo Idjellidaine from (France) Toulouse (season-long loan)
- (England) Toby Salmon from (England) Newcastle Falcons
- (France) Martin Devergie from (France) Montpellier (season-long loan)
- (South Africa) Danré Gerber from (France) Chambéry

=== Players Out ===
- (France) Paul Abadie to (France) Brive
- (France) Nathan Decron to (France) Pau
- (Samoa) Jordan Puletua to (France) Carcassonne
- (France) Julien Jané retired
- (Georgia (country)) Giorgi Tetrashvili to (France) Perpignan
- (England) Laurence Pearce retired
- (South Africa) Johann Sadie retired
- (France) Romain Briatte to (France) Stade Français
- (England) Pierce Phillips to (Scotland) Edinburgh
- (France) Yoan Cottin to (France) Nevers
- (Senegal) Fernandez Correa to (France) Massy
- (France) Marc Barthomeuf retired
- (Samoa) Jamie-Jerry Taulagi to (France) Narbonne
- (Colombia) Andrés Zafra to (France) Brive
- (South Africa) Jeremy Jordaan to (France) Vannes
- (France) Hugo Verdu to (France) Nice
- (France) Victor Moreaux to (France) Racing 92
- (Tonga) Sam Vaka to (Japan) Kyuden Voltex
- (Ireland) Noel Reid to (England) London Irish

== Aurillac ==
=== Players In ===
- (Romania) Adrian Moțoc from (France) Massy
- (France) Yann Tivoli from (France) Nice
- (Canada) Peter Nelson from (France) Bourg-en-Bresse
- (New Zealand) Lewis Ormond from (New Zealand) Taranaki
- (France) Pierre Le Huby from (France) Macon
- (France) Theo Lachaud from (France) Toulon
- (France) David Delarue from (France) Brive
- (France) Julian Royer from (France) Valence Romans
- (New Zealand) Elijah Niko from (England) Bedford Blues
- (France) Paul Farret from (France) Albi
- (France) Gymaël Jean-Jacques from (France) Albi
- (France) Lucas Vaccaro from (France) Albi
- (Ireland) Ronan Loughnane from (Ireland) University College Dublin

=== Players Out ===
- (France) Jérôme Dufour to (France) Provence
- (France) Youssef Amrouni to (France) Carcassonne
- (Australia) Reece Hewat to (France) Pau
- (France) Thomas Salles to (France) Toulon
- (France) Adrien Corbex to (France) Stade Métropolitain
- (Georgia (country)) Beka Saghinadze to (France) Lyon
- (France) Paul Boisset retired
- (New Zealand) Jack McPhee retired
- (France) Jean-Philippe Cassan retired
- (France) Bastien Coillat to (France) Bourgoin-Jallieu
- (France) Quentin Guibert to (France) Decazeville
- (France) Loïc Rouquette to (France) Decazeville

== Bayonne ==
=== Players In ===
- (France) Yann David from (France) Castres
- (France) Denis Marchois from (France) Pau
- (South Africa) Uzair Cassiem from (Wales) Scarlets
- (France) Jean-Teiva Jacquelain from (France) Mont-de-Marsan
- (Georgia (country)) Luka Chelidze from (France) Toulon
- (New Zealand) Isaia Toeava from (France) Toulon
- (France) Arnaud Erbinartegaray from (France) Mauléon
- (Australia) Chris Talakai from (Australia) NSW Waratahs
- (South Africa) Shaun Venter from (Wales) Ospreys
- Sireli Maqala from Fiji Sevens

=== Players Out ===
- (France) Romain Barthélémy to (France) Grenoble
- (Tonga) Toma'akino Taufa to (France) Grenoble
- (Chile) Iñaki Ayarza to (France) Soyaux Angoulême
- (France) Alexandre Manukula to (France) Montauban
- (Samoa) Alofa Alofa to (Australia) West Harbour
- (France) Arnaud Duputs to (France) Agen
- (Romania) Andre Gorin to (France) Hyères
- (France) Aymeric Luc to (France) Toulon
- (France) Guillaume Ducat to (France) Pau
- (Tonga) Mali Hingano to (France) Bourg-en-Bresse
- (France) Tom Darlet to (France) Bourg-en-Bresse
- (France) Ismaël Martin to (France) Bourg-en-Bresse
- (Samoa) Viliamu Afatia to (France) Albi
- (France) Vincent Pelo to (France) Valence Romans
- (England) Sam Nixon to (England) Exeter Chiefs
- (Australia) Hugh Pyle to (Japan) Toshiba Brave Lupus Tokyo

== Béziers ==
=== Players In ===
- (Spain) Charly Malié from (France) Pau
- (Georgia (country)) Giorgi Akhaladze from (France) Massy
- (France) Lionel Beauxis from (France) Oyonnax
- (France) Thomas Hoarau from (France) Toulon
- (South Africa) John-Hubert Meyer from (South Africa) Sharks
- (France) Pierrick Gunther from (France) Pau
- (Belgium) Gillian Benoy from (France) Suresnes
- (Spain) Jon Zabala from (France) Tarbes
- (Fiji) Watisoni Votu from (France) Pau
- (France) Pierre Gayraud from (France) Grenoble
- (South Africa) Dries Swanepoel from (South Africa) Cheetahs

=== Players Out ===
- (England) Karl Wilkins to (England) Northampton Saints
- (Algeria) Jonathan Best to (France) Valence Romans
- (Fiji) Uwa Tawalo to (France) Massy
- (South Africa) Robert Ebersohn to (South Africa) Cheetahs
- (France) Quentin Samaran to (France) Biarritz
- (France) Nicolas Lemaire to (France) Massy
- (France) Anthony Aleo to (France) Valence Romans
- (South Africa) Tristan Tedder to (France) Perpignan
- (Argentina) Santiago Iglesias Valdez to (France) Marcq-en-Baroeul
- (France) Pierre Bérard to (France) Bourg-en-Bresse
- (Spain) Álvar Gimeno to (Spain) Valladolid

== Bourg-en-Bresse ==
=== Players In ===
- (France) Élie De Fleurian from (France) Bourgoin-Jallieu
- (Canada) Matt Beukeboom from (France) Montauban
- (Argentina) Sebastián Poet from (France) Colomiers
- (France) Nicolas Faure from (France) Valence Romans
- (Tonga) Mali Hingano from (France) Bayonne
- (Georgia (country)) Zauri Tevdorashvili from (France) Soyaux Angoulême
- (France) Tom Darlet from (France) Bayonne
- (France) Ismaël Martin from (France) Bayonne
- (Samoa) TJ Ioane from (England) London Irish
- (Australia) Latu Latunipulu from (France) Valence Romans
- (Samoa) Elia Elia from (England) Harlequins
- (France) Pierre Bérard from (France) Béziers
- (France) Thibault Olender from (France) Perpignan

=== Players Out ===
- (France) Pierre Bochaton from (France) Bordeaux
- (France) Émile Cailleaud to (France) Causse Vezere
- (France) Lucas Estevenet to (France) Limoges
- (France) Paul Sauzaret to (France) Aubenas Vals
- (France) Simon Bornuat retired
- (Canada) Peter Nelson to (France) Aurillac
- (France) Audric Sanlaville to (France) Rouen
- (France) Quentin Traversier retired
- (France) Arnaud Perret retired
- (Spain) Gregory Maiquez to (France) Stade Métropolitain

== Carcassonne ==
=== Players In ===
- (France) Jérémy Boyadjis from (France) Toulon
- (France) Youssef Amrouni from (France) Aurillac
- (France) Louis-Mathieu Jazeix from (France) Macon
- (Samoa) Jordan Puletua from (France) Agen
- (New Zealand) Aaron Carroll from (New Zealand) Bay of Plenty
- (South Africa) Tim Agaba from (South Africa) Bulls
- (Canada) Ciaran Breen from (Canada) University of British Columbia
- (France) Pierre Reynaud from (France) Perpignan
- (France) Maxime Marty from (France) Toulouse
- (Portugal) Samuel Marques from (France) Pau
- (Ireland) Johnny McPhillips from (England) Leicester Tigers
- (South Africa) Andries Ferreira from (Scotland) Edinburgh
- (Argentina) Ignacio Calas from (Australia) Melbourne Rebels
- (Wales) Dorian Jones from (France) Nice

=== Players Out ===
- (France) Joël Koffi retired
- (France) Damien Teissedre to (France) Massy
- (France) Romuald Séguy to (France) Colomiers
- (France) Alexandre Dardet to (France) La Seyne
- (France) Alexandre Duny to (France) Tarbes
- (England) Harry Glover to (France) Stade Français
- (England) Darrell Dyer to (France) Valence Romans
- (Ivory Coast) Bakary Meité retired
- (France) Julien Rey retired
- (France) Sébastien Giorgis to (France) Gruissan
- (France) Lucas Méret to (France) Narbonne
- (New Zealand) Tiuke Mahoni to (France) Valence Romans

== Colomiers ==
=== Players In ===
- (France) Florian Nicot from (France) Pau
- (France) Maxime Javaux from (France) Valence Romans
- (France) Jorick Dastugue from (France) Rouen
- (France) Romuald Séguy from (France) Carcassonne
- (Italy) Michele Campagnaro from (England) Harlequins
- (France) Karl Château from (France) Perpignan

=== Players Out ===
- (France) Bastien Vergnes-Taillfer to (France) Bordeaux
- (Fiji) Josua Vici to (France) Montpellier
- (France) Aurélien Beco retired
- (France) Jules Soulan to (France) Oyonnax
- (France) Thomas Larregain to (France) Castres
- (France) Gilen Queheille to (France) Nice
- (France) Maxime Laforgue to (France) Soyaux Angoulême
- (France) Ronan Chambord to (France) Langon
- (Argentina) Sebastián Poet to (France) Bourg-en-Bresse
- (France) François Fontaine to (France) Soyaux Angoulême
- (South Africa) Mees Erasmus to (France) Tarbes

== Grenoble ==
=== Players In ===
- (France) Romain Barthélémy from (France) Bayonne
- (France) Thomas Fortunel from (France) Castres
- (France) Thomas Lainault from (France) Rouen
- (Tonga) Toma'akino Taufa from (France) Bayonne
- (South Africa) Jan Uys from (South Africa) Bulls
- (France) Adrien Vigne from (France) Tarbes
- (Argentina) Bautista Ezcurra from (United States) Rugby ATL
- (Fiji) Pio Muarua from (France) Mont-de-Marsan
- (Georgia (country)) Luka Goginava from (France) Soyaux Angoulême
- (South Africa) Marnus Schoeman from (South Africa) Lions
- (England) Levi Douglas from (France) Toulon
- (Georgia (country)) Zurabi Zhvania from (England) Wasps
- (Argentina) Felipe Ezcurra from (Argentina) Jaguares XV

=== Players Out ===
- (France) Anthony Alves to (France) Mont-de-Marsan
- (France) Enzo Selponi to (France) Provence
- (New Zealand) Taleta Tupuola to (France) Montauban
- (Tonga) Alaska Taufa to (France) Valence Romans
- (Georgia (country)) Nika Neparidze to (France) Nice
- (France) Théo Nanette to (France) Provence
- (France) Michaël Simutoga to (France) Bourgoin-Jallieu
- (France) Dylan Jacquot to (France) Rouen
- (South Africa) Deon Fourie to (South Africa) Stormers
- (Tonga) Leva Fifita to (Ireland) Connacht
- (France) Pierre Gayraud to (France) Béziers
- (France) Crimson Tukino to (France) Castres
- (France) Feybian Tukino from (France) Castres
- (France) River Tukino from (France) Castres
- (France) William Demotte to (France) Agen
- (France) Jérôme Rey to (France) Lyon
- (France) Louis Bielle-Biarrey to (France) Bordeaux
- (Russia) Andrei Ostrikov to (France) Mont-de-Marsan

== Mont-de-Marsan ==
=== Players In ===
- (France) Anthony Alves from (France) Grenoble
- (France) Gauthier Doubrere from (France) Biarritz
- (South Africa) Willie du Plessis from (France) Biarritz
- (France) Thibault Tauleigne from (France) Oyonnax
- (France) Pierre Sayerse from (France) Montauban
- (Argentina) Lucas Mensa from (France) Valence Romans
- (France) Jules Even from (France) Soyaux Angoulême
- (France) Simon Labouyrie from (France) Hyères
- (Russia) Andrei Ostrikov from (France) Grenoble
- (Tonga) Michael Faleafa from (France) Perpignan
- (Argentina) Lucio Sordoni from (Australia) Melbourne Rebels

=== Players Out ===
- (France) Jean-Teiva Jacquelain to (France) Bayonne
- (France) Emmanuel Saubusse to (France) Soyaux Angoulême
- (France) Christophe David to (France) Narbonne
- (France) Theo Castinel to (France) Narbonne
- (Fiji) Pio Muarua to (France) Grenoble
- (France) Thibaud Rey to (France) Nice
- (Samoa) Maselino Paulino to (France) Montauban
- (France) Clément Gelin to (France) Voiron
- (France) Charles Brayer to (France) Valence Romans
- (France) Patxi Bidart to (France) Soyaux Angoulême
- (Belgium) Jens Torfs to (France) Nice
- (France) Baptiste Couchinave to (France) Albi
- (France) Thomas Roche to (France) Chartres
- (England) Tommy Bell to (Italy) Benetton

== Montauban ==
=== Players In ===
- (France) Anthony Meric from (France) Toulon
- (France) Fred Quercy from (France) Nevers
- (Namibia) Tjiuee Uanivi from (France) Massy
- (France) Paul Bonnefond from (France) Vannes
- (France) Kevin Firmin from (France) Castres
- (New Zealand) Taleta Tupuola from (France) Grenoble
- (France) Raphael Sanchez from (France) La Rochelle
- (Argentina) Segundo Tuculet from (France) Valence Romans
- (Georgia (country)) Mirian Burduli from (France) Valence Romans
- (France) Alexandre Manukula from (France) Bayonne
- (Samoa) Maselino Paulino from (France) Mont-de-Marsan
- (France) Quentin Delord from (France) Brive
- (France) Dan Malafosse from (France) Brive
- (France) Quentin Pueyo from (France) Massy
- (France) Louis Vincent from (France) Stade Français
- (New Zealand) Wharenui Hawera from (Japan) Kubota Spears Funabashi Tokyo Bay
- (France) Arnaud Feltrin from (France) Albi
- (Canada) Liam Bowman from (Canada) Pacific Pride
- (Fiji) Nikola Matawalu from (Scotland) Glasgow Warriors
- (France) Louis Druart from (France) Lyon (season-long loan)

=== Players Out ===
- (France) Pierre Klur released
- (France) Paul Graou to (France) Agen
- (Switzerland) Corentin Braendlin to (France) La Seyne
- (Samoa) Aviata Silago to (France) Nevers
- (France) Jeremy Chaput to (France) Narbonne
- (Australia) Kimami Sitauti to (France) Narbonne
- (France) Pierre Sayerse to (France) Mont-de-Marsan
- (France) Alexandre Loubière to (France) Massy
- (France) Kilian Tripier to (France) Bourgoin-Jallieu
- (Samoa) Utu Maninoa to (France) Tarbes
- (New Zealand) Alex Luatua to (France) Rouen
- (Ivory Coast) Evrard Dion Oulai to (France) Massy
- (France) Benoît Zanon retired
- (France) Paul Tailhades to (France) Pau
- (Canada) Matt Beukeboom to (France) Bourg-en-Bresse
- (Belgium) Jens Torfs to (France) Nice
- (France) Louis Decavel to (France) Castelsarrasin
- (Portugal) Mike Tadjer to (France) Perpignan
- (France) Corentin Astier to (France) Nice

== Narbonne ==
=== Players In ===
- (France) Christophe David from (France) Mont-de-Marsan
- (France) Theo Castinel from (France) Mont-de-Marsan
- (France) Jeremy Chaput from (France) Montauban
- (Australia) Kimami Sitauti from (France) Montauban
- (France) Louis-Benoît Madaule from (France) Toulouse
- (Portugal) Geoffrey Moïse from (France) Pau
- (France) Paul Belzons from (France) Soyaux Angoulême
- (Portugal) Manuel Cardoso Pinto from (Portugal) Agronomia
- (Samoa) Jamie-Jerry Taulagi from (France) Agen
- (New Zealand) Carl Axtens from (France) Toulouse
- (New Zealand) Jason Robertson from (United States) Old Glory DC
- (France) Mohamed Boughanmi from (France) Pau
- (Fiji) Save Totovosau from (United States) San Diego Legion
- (France) Lucas Lebraud from (France) Biarritz
- (Argentina) Martín Vaca from (Argentina) Jaguares XV
- (France) Lucas Méret from (France) Carcassonne
- (South Africa) Aston Fortuin from (United States) Utah Warriors
- (New Zealand) Luke Campbell from (New Zealand) Hurricanes

=== Players Out ===
- (France) Téva Maké retired
- (Scotland) Ross Bundy to (France) Rennes
- (France) Mickaël Recordier retired
- (Samoa) David Smith retired
- (France) Léo Griffoul to (France) Leucate
- (South Africa) Elandré Huggett to (France) Hyeres
- (Germany) Raynor Parkinson released
- (France) Alexandre Baron to (France) Gruissan
- (France) Stellio Bessaguet to (France) Nice
- (Portugal) Manuel Cardoso Pinto released

== Nevers ==
=== Players In ===
- (Poland) Andrzej Charlat from (France) Provence
- (France) Benjamin Dumas from (France) Massy
- (Samoa) Aviata Silago from (France) Montauban
- (France) Quentin Beaudaux from (France) Clermont (season-long loan)
- (France) Yoan Cottin from (France) Agen
- (France) Kevin Noah from (France) Clermont (season-long loan)
- (South Africa) Shaun Adendorff from (England) Northampton Saints
- (Argentina) Joaquín Blangetti from (Argentina) San Martín

=== Players Out ===
- (South Africa) Philip du Preez to (France) Mâcon
- (Georgia (country)) Guram Papidze to (France) La Rochelle
- (Australia) David Lolohea to (France) Provence
- (Fiji) Josaia Raisuqe to (France) Castres
- (France) Fred Quercy to (France) Montauban
- (Fiji) Nasoni Naqiri to (France) Soyaux Angoulême
- (South Africa) Nemo Roelofse to (France) Stade Français
- (France) Jean-Philippe Genevois retired
- (France) Jean-Yves Zébango to (Spain) El Salvador
- (Fiji) Ilikena Bolakoro to (France) Dax
- (France) Loïc Le Gal to (France) Nice
- (South Africa) Pieter Ferreira to (Italy) Lazio

== Oyonnax ==
=== Players In ===
- (France) Jules Soulan from (France) Carcassonne
- (France) Florian Vialelle from (France) Castres
- (France) Thibault Berthaud from (France) Soyaux Angoulême
- (Australia) Tom Murday from (Japan) Toyota Industries Shuttles Aichi
- (France) Kévin Lebreton from (France) Rouen
- (Ireland) Darren Sweetnam from (France) La Rochelle

=== Players Out ===
- (France) Lionel Beauxis to (France) Béziers
- (France) Thibault Tauleigne to (France) Mont-de-Marsan
- (Samoa) Josh Tyrell to (France) Biarritz
- (France) Antoine Zeghdar to (France) Castres
- (France) Benjamin Fall released
- (South Africa) Frans van Wyk released
- (France) Tim Giresse to (France) Valence Romans
- (France) Lilian Camara to (France) Chartres
- (Australia) Chris Feauai-Sautia to (Australia) Brumbies
- (Scotland) Josh Strauss to (Israel) Tel Aviv Heat

== Provence ==
=== Players In ===
- (Australia) David Lolohea from (France) Nevers
- (France) Jérôme Dufour from (France) Aurillac
- (France) Enzo Selponi from (France) Grenoble
- (France) Kevin Bly from (France) Vannes
- (France) Alexandre Flanquart from (France) Bordeaux
- (Australia) Peter Betham from (France) Clermont
- (France) Hans N'Kinsi from (France) Castres
- (France) Théo Nanette from (France) Grenoble
- (Uruguay) Germán Kessler from (France) Soyaux Angoulême
- (Fiji) Eroni Sau from (Scotland) Edinburgh
- (France) Louis Marrou from (France) Rouen
- (Fiji) Luke Tagi from (France) Stade Français
- (Argentina) Federico Wegrzyn from (Argentina) Jaguares XV
- (France) Quentin Witt from (France) Soyaux Angoulême
- (Argentina) Tomás de la Vega from (Canada) Toronto Arrows (short-term deal)
- (New Zealand) Jonathan Ruru from (New Zealand) Blues
- (Argentina) Nicolás Toth from (Argentina) Jaguares XV

=== Players Out ===
- (France) Clément Darbo to (France) Biarritz
- (Poland) Andrzej Charlat to (France) Nevers
- (France) Bertrand Guiry retired
- (France) Julien Le Devedec retired
- (France) Antonin Gontard to (France) Aubenas Vals
- (France) Yohan Montès to (France) Beauvais
- (France) Romain Sola to (France) Bourgoin-Jallieu
- (France) Dorian Lavernhe to (France) Nice
- (France) Baptiste Delage to (France) Nice
- (France) Thibaut Zambelli to (France) Nice
- (France) Pierre Rude to (France) Issoire
- (France) Jérôme Mondoulet to (France) Nice
- (France) Oleg Ishchenko retired
- (Belgium) Lucas De Coninck released
- (France) Ludovic Radosavljevic to (France) SO Avignon

== Rouen ==
=== Players In ===
- (Romania) Taylor Gontineac from (France) Clermont
- (France) Abdelkurim Fofana from (France) Suresnes
- (South Africa) JT Jackson unattached
- (France) Joris Lezat from (France) Le Havre
- (New Zealand) Alex Luatua from (France) Montauban
- (France) Dylan Jacquot from (France) Grenoble
- (France) Amidou Marciniek from (France) Marcq-en-Barœul
- (France) Willy N'Diaye from (France) Valence Romans
- (France) Audric Sanlaville from (France) Bourg-en-Bresse
- (Romania) Alexandru Țăruș from (Italy) Zebre Parma
- (United States) Psalm Wooching from (United States) San Diego Legion
- (United States) Michael Baska from (United States) Utah Warriors

=== Players Out ===
- (France) Florent Guion to (France) Agen
- (France) Jorick Dastugue to (France) Colomiers
- (France) Thomas Lainault to (France) Grenoble
- (Tonga) William Takai retired
- (France) Enzo Mondon to (France) Tarbes
- (Samoa) James Johnston to (France) Nice
- (France) Yohan Domenech retired
- (France) Antoine Frisch to (England) Bristol Bears
- (France) Kévin Lebreton to (France) Oyonnax
- (France) Louis Marrou to (France) Provence
- (Georgia (country)) Tamaz Mchedlidze to (France) Dax
- (England) Dean Adamson to (England) Bedford Blues

== Vannes ==
=== Players In ===
- (France) Rémi Leroux from (France) La Rochelle
- (France) Quentin Étienne from (France) Perpignan
- (South Africa) Rudy Paige unattached
- (South Africa) Jeremy Jordaan from (France) Agen
- (England) Myles Edwards from (Japan) Toshiba Brave Lupus Tokyo
- (Ireland) Rodney Ah You from (England) Newcastle Falcons
- Sacha Valleau from France Sevens
- (France) Alexandre Borie from (France) Bordeaux
- (New Zealand) Dan Hollinshead from (United States) Rugby United New York
- (France) Erwan Dridi from (France) Toulon (season-long loan)
- (Argentina) Francisco Gorrissen from (Argentina) Jaguares XV
- (Uruguay) Nicolás Freitas from (Uruguay) Peñarol

=== Players Out ===
- (France) Pierre Popelin to (France) La Rochelle
- (France) Rémi Picquette to (France) La Rochelle
- (France) Kevin Bly to (France) Provence
- (France) Rémi Seneca to (France) Pau
- (France) Paul Bonnefond to (France) Montauban
- (France) Joris Moura to (France) Valence Romans
- (Spain) Bastien Fuster retired
- (France) Anatole Pauvert to (France) Valence Romans
- (France) Florian Cazenave retired
- (France) Brendan Lebrun to (France) Castres
- (France) Alexis Levron to (France) Pau
- (Fiji) Laijaisa Bolenaivalu to (France) Nice
- (England) Henry Trinder to (England) Ampthill
- (South Africa) Jeremy Jordaan released

== See also ==
- List of 2021–22 Premiership Rugby transfers
- List of 2021–22 United Rugby Championship transfers
- List of 2021–22 Super Rugby transfers
- List of 2021–22 Top 14 transfers
- List of 2021–22 RFU Championship transfers
- List of 2021–22 Major League Rugby transfers
