= List of 2021–22 Top 14 transfers =

This is a list of player transfers involving Top 14 teams before or during the 2021–22 season. The list is of deals that are confirmed and are either from or to a rugby union team in the Top 14 during the 2020–21 season. It is not unknown for confirmed deals to be cancelled at a later date. Perpignan were promoted to the Top 14 following the 2020–21 Rugby Pro D2 season whilst Agen were relegated to Rugby Pro D2 following the 2020–21 season. Biarritz were then also promoted after defeating Bayonne in the promotion-relegation match, with Bayonne relegated to the Rugby Pro D2 for the 2021–22 season.

== Biarritz ==
=== Players in ===
- (France) Antoine Erbani from (France) Pau
- (France) Clément Darbo from (France) Provence
- (France) Zakaria El Fakir from (France) Bordeaux
- (Samoa) Josh Tyrell from (France) Oyonnax
- (Argentina) Tomás Cubelli from (Australia) Western Force
- (France) Quentin Samaran from (France) Beziers
- (England) Brett Herron from (England) Harlequins
- (Australia) Tevita Kuridrani from (Australia) Western Force
- (Ireland) James Cronin from (Ireland) Munster
- (France) Vincent Martin from (France) Montpellier
- (New Zealand) Elliot Dixon from (Japan) Black Rams Tokyo
- (France) Bastien Soury from (France) Toulon

=== Players out ===
- (France) Gaëtan Robert to (France) Suresnes
- (France) Gauthier Doubrere to (France) Mont-de-Marsan
- (South Africa) Willie du Plessis to (France) Mont-de-Marsan
- (France) Thomas Synaeghel retired
- (France) Steven David to (France) Valence Romans
- (France) Lucas Lebraud to (France) Narbonne
- (Ireland) James Hart to (France) Bordeaux

== Bordeaux ==
=== Players in ===
- (France) Bastien Vergnes-Taillfer from (France) Colomiers
- (France) Louis Picamoles from (France) Montpellier
- (France) François Trinh-Duc from (France) Racing 92
- (France) Pierre Bochaton from (France) Bourg-en-Bresse
- (France) Thomas Jolmès from (France) Toulon
- (France) Alban Roussel from (France) Perpignan
- (Argentina) Pablo Dimcheff from (France) Soyaux Angoulême
- (France) Louis Bielle-Biarrey from (France) Grenoble
- (Italy) Federico Mori from (Italy) Calvisano
- (Ireland) James Hart from (France) Biarritz

=== Players out ===
- (France) Marco Tauleigne to (France) Montpellier
- (New Zealand) Ben Botica to (France) Castres
- (France) Zakaria El Fakir to (France) Biarritz
- (France) Alexandre Flanquart to (France) Provence
- (Georgia (country)) Beka Gorgadze to (France) Pau
- (France) Baptiste Castanier to (France) Langon
- (Argentina) Bautista Delguy to (France) Perpignan
- (France) Laurent Delboulbès retired
- (Australia) Scott Higginbotham retired
- (France) Alexandre Borie to (France) Vannes

== Brive ==
=== Players in ===
- (France) Daniel Brennan from (France) Montpellier
- (France) Paul Abadie from (France) Agen
- (Fiji) Tevita Ratuva from (Wales) Scarlets
- (France) Enzo Sanga from (France) Valence Romans
- (Colombia) Andrés Zafra from (France) Agen
- (New Zealand) Dylan Lam from (New Zealand) Kumeu

=== Players out ===
- (France) Julien Blanc to (France) Toulon
- (Fiji) Eneriko Buliruarua to (France) La Rochelle
- (France) Quentin Delord to (France) Montauban
- (France) David Delarue to (France) Aurillac
- (France) Dan Malafosse to (France) Montauban
- (Samoa) Brandon Nansen to (England) Northampton Saints
- (South Africa) Peet Marais retired
- (Georgia (country)) Badri Alkhazashvili to (France) Nice
- (Fiji) Mesake Doge to (Wales) Dragons
- (Georgia (country)) Irakli Tskhadadze to (France) Soyaux Angoulême

== Castres ==
=== Players in ===
- (Georgia (country)) Levan Chilachava from (France) Montpellier
- (New Zealand) Ben Botica from (France) Bordeaux
- (France) Pierre Aguillon from (France) La Rochelle
- (France) Quentin Walcker from (France) Perpignan
- (Fiji) Josaia Raisuqe from (France) Nevers
- (France) Théo Hannoyer from (France) Valence Romans
- (France) Thomas Larregain from (France) Colomiers
- (France) Antoine Guillamon from (France) Montpellier
- (France) Crimson Tukino from (France) Grenoble
- (France) Feybian Tukino from (France) Grenoble
- (France) River Tukino from (France) Grenoble
- (New Zealand) Teariki Ben-Nicholas from (New Zealand) Highlanders
- (France) Antoine Zeghdar from (France) Oyonnax
- (France) Brendan Lebrun from (France) Vannes
- (Australia) Nick Champion de Crespigny from (Australia) Sydney University
- (France) Brice Humbert from (France) Valence Romans
- (New Zealand) Jack Whetton from (Australia) NSW Waratahs
- (Tonga) Mateaki Kafatolu from (New Zealand) Petone

=== Players out ===
- (France) Anthony Jelonch to (France) Toulouse
- (France) Yann David to (France) Bayonne
- (France) Thomas Fortunel to (France) Grenoble
- (France) Hans N'Kinsi to (France) Provence
- (France) Armand Batlle retired
- (France) Florian Vialelle to (France) Oyonnax
- (France) Kévin Firmin to (France) Montauban
- (France) Marc-Antoine Rallier retired
- (France) Daniel Kötze released
- (France) Lucas Pointud returned to (France) Pau
- (Tonga) Maama Vaipulu released
- (France) Dorian Clerc to (France) Provence
- (France) Pierre Tatre to (France) Graulhet

== Clermont ==
=== Players in ===
- (Argentina) Tomás Lavanini from (England) Leicester Tigers
- (Ireland) JJ Hanrahan from (Ireland) Munster
- Marvin O'Connor from France Sevens (short-term deal)

=== Players out ===
- (Australia) Peter Betham to (France) Provence
- (Romania) Taylor Gontineac to (France) Rouen
- (France) Quentin Beaudaux to (France) Nevers (season-long loan)
- (France) Kevin Noah to (France) Nevers (season-long loan)
- (Samoa) Tim Nanai-Williams to (France) Toulouse
- (England) Rory Jennings to (England) London Irish
- (South Africa) Reinach Venter to (France) Albi

== La Rochelle ==
=== Players in ===
- (France) Jonathan Danty from (France) Stade Français
- (France) Pierre Popelin from (France) Vannes
- (France) Rémi Picquette from (France) Vannes
- (Fiji) Eneriko Buliruarua from (France) Brive
- (Georgia (country)) Guram Papidze from (France) Nevers
- (Argentina) Joel Sclavi from (Argentina) Jaguares XV
- (Samoa) Motu Matu'u from (England) London Irish (short-term deal)
- Kavekini Tabu from Fiji Sevens

=== Players out ===
- (France) Geoffrey Doumayrou to (France) Montpellier
- (France) Pierre Aguillon to (France) Castres
- (France) Gabriel Lacroix retired
- (France) Rémi Leroux to (France) Vannes
- (Tonga) Loni Uhila to (France) Hyères
- (Netherlands) Zeno Kieft retired
- (France) Raphael Sanchez to (France) Montauban
- (France) César Baudin to (France) Niort
- (France) Matthieu Thomas to (France) Valence d'Agen
- (France) Arthur Joly to (France) Perpignan
- (France) Thomas Carol to (France) Pau
- (Tonga) Lopeti Timani to (France) Toulon
- (Ireland) Darren Sweetnam to (France) Oyonnax
- (South Africa) Marcel van der Merwe to (England) London Irish
- (France) Kevin Gourdon retired

== Lyon ==
=== Players in ===
- (France) Romain Taofifénua from (France) Toulon
- (New Zealand) Lima Sopoaga from (England) Wasps
- (Georgia (country)) Beka Saghinadze from (France) Aurillac
- (Georgia (country)) Davit Niniashvili from (Georgia (country)) Khvamli
- Tavite Veredamu from France Sevens
- (France) Guillaume Marchand from (France) Toulouse
- (France) Sébastien Taofifénua from (France) Toulon
- (France) Jérôme Rey from (France) Grenoble
- (England) Joel Kpoku from (England) Saracens

=== Players out ===
- (France) Jonathan Wisniewski retired
- (Australia) Izack Rodda to (Australia) Western Force
- (France) Jérémie Maurouard to (France) Montpellier
- (France) Victor Barnier to (France) Aubenas Vals
- (France) Rémy Grosso retired
- (France) Kévin Yaméogo to (France) Pau
- (France) Gillian Galan retired
- (New Zealand) Alex Tulou to (France) Dax
- (France) Louis Druart to (France) Montauban (season-long loan)
- (United States) Joe Taufeteʻe to (United States) LA Giltinis

== Montpellier ==
=== Players in ===
- (France) Marco Tauleigne from (France) Bordeaux
- (Fiji) Masivesi Dakuwaqa from (France) Toulon
- (France) Geoffrey Doumayrou from (France) La Rochelle
- (Algeria) Malik Hamadache from (France) Pau
- (England) Zach Mercer from (England) Bath
- (Fiji) Josua Vici from (France) Colomiers
- (Australia) Brandon Paenga-Amosa from (Australia) Queensland Reds
- (France) Jérémie Maurouard from (France) Lyon
- (France) Pierre Lucas from (France) Perpignan
- (Italy) Paolo Garbisi from (Italy) Benetton
- (England) Henry Thomas from (England) Bath

=== Players out ===
- (Georgia (country)) Levan Chilachava to (France) Castres
- (France) Daniel Brennan to (France) Brive
- (France) Louis Picamoles to (France) Bordeaux
- (France) Youri Delhommel to (France) Pau
- (South Africa) Jacques du Plessis to (South Africa) Bulls
- (South Africa) Johan Goosen to (South Africa) Bulls
- (South Africa) Henry Immelman to (Scotland) Edinburgh
- (France) Antoine Guillamon to (France) Castres
- (England) Alex Lozowski returned to (England) Saracens
- (France) Jules Danglot to (France) Toulon
- (Australia) Caleb Timu retired
- (France) Vincent Martin to (France) Biarritz
- (South Africa) Bismarck du Plessis to (South Africa) Bulls
- (England) Gabriel Ibitoye to (Israel) Tel Aviv Heat
- (France) Martin Devergie to (France) Agen (season-long loan)

== Pau ==
=== Players in ===
- (France) Nathan Decron from (France) Agen
- (France) Rémi Seneca from (France) Vannes
- (Australia) Reece Hewat from (France) Aurillac
- (France) Youri Delhommel from (France) Montpellier
- (Georgia (country)) Beka Gorgadze from (France) Bordeaux
- (Tonga) Siate Tokolahi from (New Zealand) Highlanders
- (France) Thomas Carol from (France) La Rochelle
- Mathias Colombet from France Sevens
- (Australia) Steve Cummins from (Australia) Melbourne Rebels
- (France) Thibault Hamonou from (France) Toulouse
- (Australia) Jack Maddocks from (Australia) NSW Waratahs
- (France) Paul Tailhades from (France) Montauban
- (France) Kévin Yaméogo from (France) Lyon
- (England) Zack Henry from (England) Leicester Tigers
- (France) Daniel Ikpefan from (France) Toulon
- (France) Guillaume Ducat from (France) Bayonne
- (France) Alexis Levron from (France) Vannes
- (France) Jordan Joseph from (France) Racing 92 (season-long loan)

=== Players out ===
- (France) Denis Marchois to (France) Bayonne
- (Algeria) Malik Hamadache to (France) Montpellier
- (France) Antoine Erbani to (France) Biarritz
- (France) Florian Nicot to (France) Colomiers
- (Spain) Charly Malié to (France) Béziers
- (Australia) Matt Philip to (Australia) Melbourne Rebels
- (Portugal) Geoffrey Moïse to (France) Narbonne
- (France) Pierrick Gunther to (France) Béziers
- (France) Julien Fumat retired
- (Fiji) Watisoni Votu to (France) Béziers
- (South Africa) Lourens Adriaanse to (South Africa) Sharks
- (France) Hugo Bonneval released
- (Portugal) Samuel Marques to (France) Carcassonne
- (France) Lucas Pointud released
- (France) Mohamed Boughanmi to (France) Narbonne
- (France) Atila Septar to (France) Toulon
- (France) Baptiste Pesenti to (France) Racing 92
- (Georgia (country)) Omar Odishvili to (France) Soyaux Angoulême
- (France) Matthieu Ugena to (France) Perpignan
- (Australia) Jesse Mogg to (Australia) Brumbies
- (France) Baptiste Couchinave to (France) Albi
- (South Africa) Elton Jantjies to (Japan) NTT DoCoMo Red Hurricanes Osaka

== Perpignan ==
=== Players in ===
- (Georgia (country)) Giorgi Tetrashvili from (France) Agen
- (Fiji) Eddie Sawailau from (France) Valence Romans
- (France) Arthur Joly from (France) La Rochelle
- (Argentina) Bautista Delguy from (France) Bordeaux
- (South Africa) Tristan Tedder from (France) Béziers
- (Argentina) Martín Landajo from (England) Harlequins
- (Portugal) Mike Tadjer from (France) Montauban
- (France) Sami Mavinga from (France) Stade Français
- (France) Matthieu Ugena from (France) Pau
- (Fiji) Tevita Cavubati from (England) Harlequins
- (Moldova) Andrei Mahu from (England) London Irish
- (Argentina) Joaquín Oviedo from (Argentina) Jaguares XV
- (Australia) Brayden Wiliame from (Australia) St. George Illawarra Dragons
- (Ireland) Conor Carey from (England) Worcester Warriors
- (Australia) Hugh Roach from (United States) Austin Gilgronis

=== Players out ===
- (France) Quentin Walcker to (France) Castres
- (France) Alban Roussel to (France) Bordeaux
- (France) Quentin Étienne to (France) Vannes
- (France) Terry Philippart retired
- (France) Pierre Reynaud to (France) Carcassonne
- (France) Pierre Lucas to (France) Montpellier
- (Fiji) Ben Volavola to (France) Racing 92
- (France) Kévin Tougne to (France) Cognac Saint-Jean-d'Angély
- (France) Ugo Mas to (France) Cognac Saint-Jean-d'Angély
- (France) Thibault Olender to (France) Bourg-en-Bresse
- (France) Thibauld Suchier to (France) Saint-en-Jean-Royans
- (Tonga) Michael Faleafa to (France) Mont-de-Marsan
- (Ireland) Conor Carey to (England) Northampton Saints
- (France) Karl Château to (France) Colomiers

== Racing 92 ==
=== Players in ===
- (Fiji) Ben Volavola from (France) Perpignan
- (France) Baptiste Pesenti from (France) Pau
- (France) Victor Moreaux from (France) Agen
- (Australia) Mitch Short from (Australia) Randwick
- (Namibia) Anton Bresler from (England) Worcester Warriors
- (South Africa) Trevor Nyakane from (South Africa) Bulls

=== Players out ===
- (France) François Trinh-Duc to (France) Bordeaux
- (Ireland) Simon Zebo to (Ireland) Munster
- (New Zealand) Dominic Bird to (New Zealand) Hurricanes
- (Ireland) Donnacha Ryan retired
- (France) Antonie Claassen to (France) Suresnes
- (Argentina) Emiliano Boffelli to (Scotland) Edinburgh
- (France) Jordan Joseph to (France) Pau (season-long loan)
- (France) Dorian Laborde to (France) Toulon
- (Australia) Kurtley Beale to (Australia) NSW Waratahs

== Stade Français ==
=== Players in ===
- (South Africa) Nemo Roelofse from (France) Nevers
- (France) Romain Briatte from (France) Agen
- (France) Clément Castets from (France) Toulouse
- (New Zealand) Ngani Laumape from (New Zealand) Hurricanes
- (England) Harry Glover from (France) Carcassonne
- (South Africa) JJ van der Mescht from (South Africa) Sharks

=== Players out ===
- (France) Jonathan Danty to (France) La Rochelle
- (Argentina) Pablo Matera to (New Zealand) Crusaders
- (France) Soulemane Camara to (France) Chambéry
- (France) Stéphane Clément retired
- (Fiji) Luke Tagi to (France) Provence
- (France) Louis Vincent to (France) Montauban
- (France) Sami Mavinga to (France) Perpignan
- (South Africa) Dylan Smith to (England) Ealing Trailfinders
- (South Africa) Gerbrandt Grobler to (South Africa) Sharks

== Toulon ==
=== Players in ===
- (France) Julien Blanc from (France) Brive
- (Scotland) Cornell du Preez from (England) Worcester Warriors
- (France) Thomas Salles from (France) Aurillac
- (England) Kieran Brookes from (England) Wasps
- (Ireland) Quinn Roux from (Ireland) Connacht
- (France) Jules Danglot from (France) Montpellier
- (Tonga) Lopeti Timani from (France) La Rochelle
- Jiuta Wainiqolo from Fiji Sevens
- (France) Aymeric Luc from (France) Bayonne
- (France) Atila Septar from (France) Pau
- (Fiji) Leone Nakarawa from (Scotland) Glasgow Warriors
- (Fiji) Petero Tuwaï from (New Zealand) Southern
- (South Africa) Cheslin Kolbe from (France) Toulouse
- (United States) Mike Sosene-Feagai from (United States) Old Glory DC
- (France) Dorian Laborde from (France) Racing 92

=== Players out ===
- (Fiji) Masivesi Dakuwaqa to (France) Montpellier
- (France) Romain Taofifénua to (France) Lyon
- (France) Jérémy Boyadjis to (France) Carcassonne
- (France) Anthony Meric to (France) Montauban
- (France) Thomas Jolmès to (France) Bordeaux
- (France) Thomas Hoarau to (France) Béziers
- (New Zealand) Ma'a Nonu to (United States) San Diego Legion
- (France) Theo Lachaud to (France) Aurillac
- (England) Levi Douglas to (France) Grenoble
- (Georgia (country)) Luka Chelidze to (France) Bayonne
- (New Zealand) Isaia Toeava to (France) Bayonne
- (France) Sébastien Taofifénua to (France) Lyon
- (France) Daniel Ikpefan to (France) Pau
- (New Zealand) Rudi Wulf retired
- (Argentina) Ramiro Moyano to (Scotland) Edinburgh
- (France) Bastien Soury to (France) Biarritz
- (France) Erwan Dridi to (France) Vannes (season-long loan)

== Toulouse ==
=== Players in ===
- (France) Anthony Jelonch from (France) Castres
- (Samoa) Tim Nanai-Williams from (France) Clermont

=== Players out ===
- (France) Yoann Huget retired
- (New Zealand) Jerome Kaino retired
- (France) Clément Castets to (France) Stade Français
- (France) Louis-Benoît Madaule to (France) Narbonne
- (France) Maxime Marty to (France) Carcassonne
- (France) Guillaume Marchand to (France) Lyon
- (New Zealand) Carl Axtens to (France) Narbonne
- (France) Thibault Hamonou to (France) Pau
- (France) Théo Idjellidaine to (France) Agen (season-long loan)
- (South Africa) Cheslin Kolbe to (France) Toulon

== See also ==
- List of 2021–22 Premiership Rugby transfers
- List of 2021–22 United Rugby Championship transfers
- List of 2021–22 Super Rugby transfers
- List of 2021–22 RFU Championship transfers
- List of 2021–22 Rugby Pro D2 transfers
- List of 2021–22 Major League Rugby transfers
