= Kyle Stewart =

Kyle Stewart may refer to:

- Kyle Stewart, the northern part of Kyle, Ayrshire
- Kyle Stewart (rugby union)
