= James O'Neill (rugby union) =

Rugby union player from Northern Ireland

James O'Neill CBE
- Full name: James Bowman O'Neill
- Born: 21 August 1895 Belfast, Ireland
- Died: 19 August 1968 (aged 72) Bangor, Northern Ireland

Rugby union career
- Position: Scrum-half
International career
Years	Team	Apps	(Points)
1920	Ireland	1	(0)

James Bowman O'Neill (21 August 1895 — 19 April 1968) was an Irish international rugby union player.

O'Neill was educated at Methodist College Belfast and Queen's University Belfast.

As a scrum-half, O'Neill gained his solitary Ireland cap against Scotland at Inverleith during the 1920 Five Nations Championship. He captained the Queen's University first XV and also played rugby for Collegians.

O'Neill was a rugby writer for the Belfast News-Letter, under the pen name "Criticus".

A civil servant, O'Neill worked in the Ministry of Home Affairs for many years and was put in charge of settling the World War II evacuees from Holland, after Germany invaded. He became assistant secretary of the ministry.

== See also ==
- List of Ireland national rugby union players
