= Arthur Cordwell =

English rugby union player

- Born: 3 March 1999 (age 27)
- Height: 1.83 m (6 ft 0 in)
- Weight: 116 kg (18 st 4 lb; 256 lb)
- School: Canford School
- University: University of Bath

Rugby union career
- Position: Prop
- Current team: Bath
Senior career
Years	Team	Apps	(Points)
2021–	Bath	42	(0)
2022–2023	→ Coventry (loan)		

Arthur Cordwell (born 3 March 1999) is an English rugby union player who plays as a prop forward for Bath Rugby.

== Early life ==
From Dorset, he attended Canford School and the University of Bath where he read physics. He was a fan of the Bath Rugby side from a young age.

== Career ==
He came through the academy at Bath Rugby and was included as part of the first team squad for the 2021–22 season. He made his Premiership Rugby debut in March 2021 for Bath against Newcastle Falcons. He made his debut in the European Champions Cup against Leinster Rugby on 11 December 2021. He has also played on loan at Coventry in the Rugby Championship. On 16 March 2025, he played in the final as Bath beat Exeter Chiefs 48-14 to win the 2024-25 Premiership Rugby Cup.
