= Nika Neparidze =

- Born: February 18, 1996 (age 30) Tbilisi, Georgia
- Height: 1.83 m (6 ft 0 in)
- Weight: 110 kg (17 st 5 lb; 243 lb)

Rugby union career
- Position: Tighthead Prop
Senior career
Years	Team	Apps	(Points)
2016-	Clermont	2015-	(0)
- Correct as of 17 August 2016
International career
Years	Team	Apps	(Points)
2015-2016	Georgia U20	10	(5)
- Correct as of 24 June 2016

Nika Neparidze is a Georgian rugby union player. He plays as Tighthead Prop for ASM espoirs in Top 14.
