= Dan Nutton =

Scottish rugby union player

- Born: Daniel Nutton; 18 October 1996 (age 30) Edinburgh, Scotland
- Height: 1.75 m (5 ft 9 in)
- Weight: 80 kg (12 st 8 lb)

Rugby union career
- Position: Scrum-half
- Current team: London Scottish
Senior career
Years	Team	Apps	(Points)
2019–2021	Edinburgh Rugby	2	(0)
2021–	London Scottish	16	(43)
- Correct as of 01 June 2022

Dan Nutton (born 18 October 1996) is a Scottish rugby union player for London Scottish in the RFU Championship. Nutton's primary position is scrum-half.

== Rugby Union career ==
=== Professional career ===
Nutton made his debut for Edinburgh on 15 November 2019.
