= Kieran Verden =

English rugby union player

- Born: Kieran Brandan Verden; 6 November 1998 (age 28) Taunton, England
- Height: 1.88 m (6 ft 2 in)
- Weight: 120 kg (18 st 13 lb; 265 lb)
- School: The Taunton Academy, Beechen Cliff

Rugby union career
- Position: Prop
Senior career
Years	Team	Apps	(Points)
2016–	Bath	37	(0)
2020	→ Worcester Warriors	2	(0)
- Correct as of 1 May 2026
International career
Years	Team	Apps	(Points)
2016	England U18s		

Kieran Verden (born 6 November 1998) is an English rugby union player who competes for Bath in the Premiership Rugby.

Verden was an impressive force in 2016/17 season captaining the Bath Academy throughout the year. His performances throughout the season saw him rewarded with a place in the England U18 squad for their summer tour of South Africa. He made his first-team debut against Worcester Warriors in a 40-15 victory in the Premiership competition.

On 11 December 2020, Verden joined Warriors on a short-term loan deal as injury cover. He played twice against Pau and Ospreys in the European Rugby Challenge Cup.

On 22 June 2021, Verden signed his first professional contract to stay with Bath at The Recreation Ground, and was promoted to the senior squad from the 2021-22 season. He signed a new contract with Bath in the summer of 2025.
