= Jules Danglot =

French rugby union player

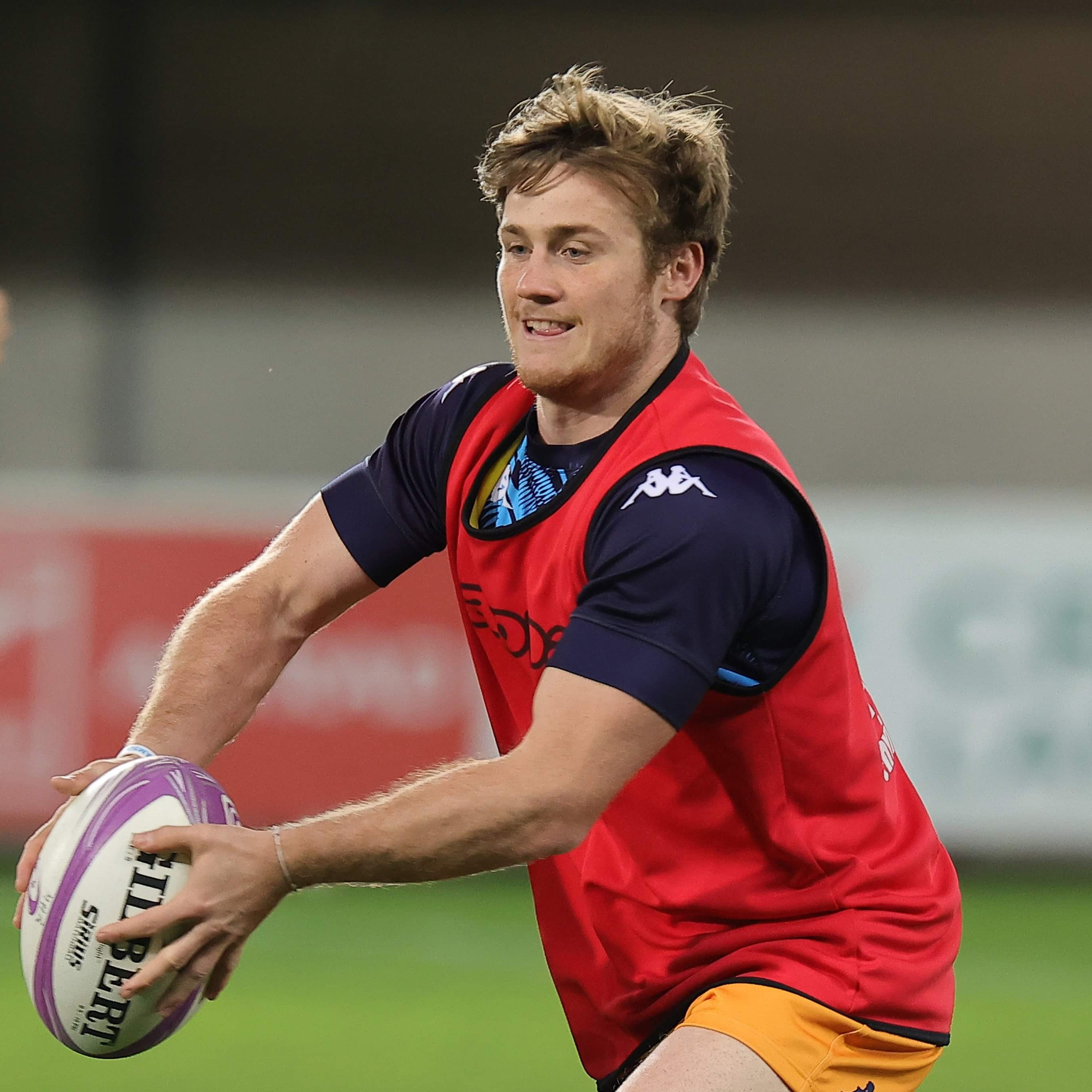
- Born: 6 August 2001 (age 25) Cahors, France
- Height: 1.70 m (5 ft 7 in)
- Weight: 70 kg (11 st 0 lb)

Rugby union career
- Position: Scrum-half
Senior career
Years	Team	Apps	(Points)
2020–2021	Montpellier	6	(0)
2021–	Toulon	31	(10)
- Correct as of 17 November 2023

Jules Danglot (born 6 August 2001) is a French rugby union player. His position is scrum-half and he currently plays for Toulon in the Top 14.

Danglot played for Montpellier Hérault Rugby youth squads. He began his professional career with Montpellier Hérault in 2020. He was signed by Toulon in June 2021.
