= Thom Smith =

English rugby union player

- Born: Thomas James Smith; 2 December 1999 (age 26) Norwich
- Height: 6 ft 1 in (185 cm)
- Weight: 16 st 3 lb (227 lb; 103 kg)

Rugby union career
- Position: Back row
- Current team: Doncaster Knights
Senior career
Years	Team	Apps	(Points)
2018–2021	Leicester Tigers	10	(0)
2021–	Doncaster Knights	2	(0)
- Correct as of 4 December 2021

Thomas James Smith (born 2 December 1999) is an English rugby union back row for Doncaster Knights in the RFU Championship, the second division. He previously played for Leicester Tigers in Premiership Rugby.

== Career ==
Smith made his debut for Leicester Tigers on 27 October 2018 in a Premiership Rugby Cup defeat against Saracens, two years later on 15 August 2020 Smith made his full Premiership debut from the bench against Exeter Chiefs.

Two weeks later Smith became Leicester's youngest captain in a league game when he led the side on 30 August 2020 against Gloucester.

On 3 December 2021 Smith was released by Leicester to join Doncaster Knights in the RFU Championship for the 2021–22 season.
