= Sam Nixon (rugby union) =

English rugby union player

- Born: Samuel Nixon; 15 August 1996 (age 30) Dorchester, Dorset, England
- Height: 1.93 m (6 ft 4 in)
- Weight: 124 kg (19 st 7 lb; 273 lb)
- School: Hazlegrove Preparatory School; Millfield School

Rugby union career
- Position: Tighthead Prop
- Current team: Grenoble
Senior career
Years	Team	Apps	(Points)
2019–2020	Bath	18	(0)
2020–2021	Bayonne	25	(0)
2021–.2022	Exeter Chiefs	10	(0)
2022–	Grenoble		
- Correct as of 9 March 2022

Sam Nixon (born 15 August 1996) is an English professional rugby union player who plays as a tighthead prop for Grenoble in France's Pro D2. He previously played for Exeter Chiefs and Bath in Premiership Rugby. Also for Top 14 club Bayonne. He started his Rugby career with London Scottish academy before joining Plymouth Albion in July 2016. He joined Bath in February 2017. A product of Hazlegrove Prep School and Millfield School.

Nixon was promoted from the Bath academy to the senior squad at the end of the 2018–19 Premiership Rugby season. He left Bath to sign for French side Bayonne in the Top 14 from the 2020–21 season.

On 13 August 2021 Nixon signed for Exeter Chiefs.
