= Guillaume Ducat =

French rugby union player (born 1996)

- Born: Guillaume Ducat; 25 May 1996 (age 30) Tarbes, France
- Height: 2.05 m (6 ft 8 ½ in)
- Weight: 115 kg (254 lb)

Rugby union career
- Position: Lock
Senior career
Years	Team	Apps	(Points)
2015–2021	Bayonne	77	(10)
2021–	Pau	17	(0)
- Correct as of 9 October 2021
International career
Years	Team	Apps	(Points)
2020–	France	1	(0)
- Correct as of 6 Dec 2020

Guillaume Ducat (born 25 May 1996) is a French rugby union player. His position is Lock and he currently plays for Pau in the Top 14.
