= Theo Vukašinović =

English rugby union lock (b. 1996)

- Born: Theo Heffernan Vukašinović; 25 June 1996 (age 30) Wandsworth, England
- Height: 1.95 m (6 ft 5 in)
- Weight: 112 kg (17 st 9 lb; 247 lb)
- School: Reed's School
- University: Loughborough University

Rugby union career
- Current team: RFC Los Angeles
Youth career
- 2013-2014: London Irish
Senior career
Years	Team	Apps	(Points)
2014-2015	London Irish	1	(0)
2014-2015	Henley Hawks	3	(0)
2015-2018	Loughborough Students RUFC	32	(10)
2018-2019	London Scottish	19	(5)
2019-2022	Wasps RFC	15	(5)
2022	Ampthill RUFC	6	(5)
2022-2023	Doncaster Knights	7	(5)
2023-2024	Northampton Saints	2	(0)
2024	RFC Los Angeles	0	(0)
- Correct as of 14 March 2024
International career
Years	Team	Apps	(Points)
2018	England Under 20		
- Correct as of 14 March 2024

Theo Heffernan Vukašinović (born 25 June 1996) is an English rugby union lock who plays for RFC Los Angeles in the MLR. He appeared 19 times for RFU Championship club London Scottish in the 2018/19 season. Ahead of the 2019/2020 season he joined Premiership Rugby team Wasps RFC.

== Early life ==
Vukašinović was born on 25 June 1996 in Wandsworth, London. He attended Reed's School in Cobham, Surrey, England. While there, he played Under 18 representative rugby for London Irish. He signed a one-year Senior Academy contract with them in 2014, and made his Senior debut for them in November against Wasps RFC in the Anglo-Welsh Cup.

The following year he declined a further contract with London Irish, instead continuing his academic studies at Loughborough University. He played for the university in rugby union National League 1 and in the British Universities and Colleges Sport (BUCS) Super Rugby. BUCS Super Rugby colour commentators described him as a "modern-day second row" and a "great all round athlete". He was included in the training squad for England Students in 2018.

== Rugby career ==
On graduation, Vukašinović rejoined professional rugby, agreeing a contract with RFU Championship club London Scottish for the 2018/19 season. He appeared 19 times for them. In May 2019, he joined Premiership Rugby team Wasps RFC for the 2019/2020 season. Wasps entered administration on 17 October 2022 and Vukašinović was made redundant along with all other players and coaching staff. On 2 November 2022, Vuksinovic signed for Doncaster Knights in the RFU Championship for the 2022-23 season.
