= Ciaran Parker =

English rugby union player

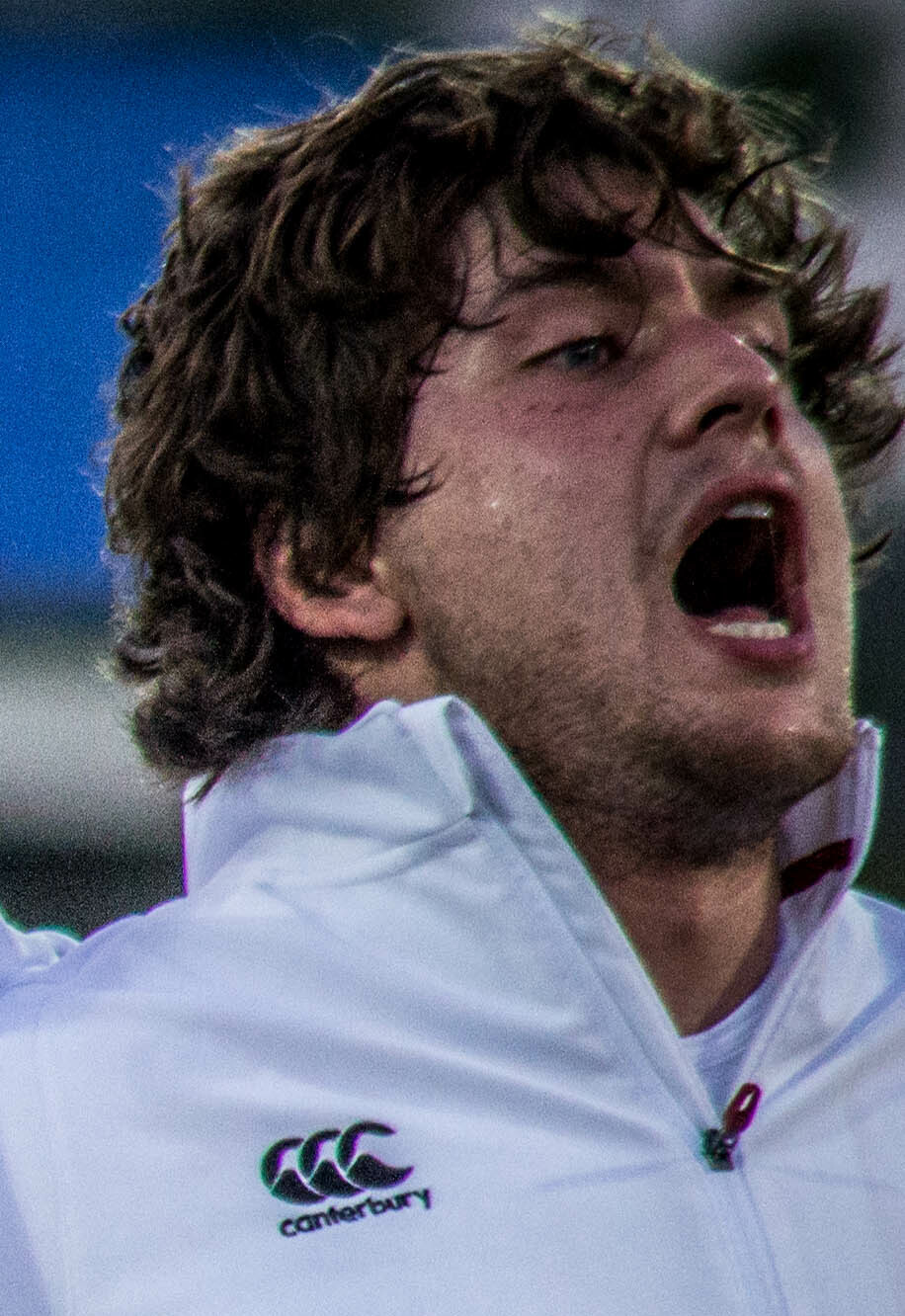
- Born: Ciaran Joseph Parker; 5 October 1995 (age 31) Stockport, England
- Height: 1.88 m (6 ft 2 in)
- Weight: 120 kg (19 st; 260 lb)
- School: St Ambrose College
- University: Manchester Metropolitan University

Rugby union career
- Position: Prop
Senior career
Years	Team	Apps	(Points)
2015–2017	Sale Sharks	12	(0)
2014	→ Chester (loan)	4	(0)
2016	→ Yorkshire Carnegie (loan)	4	(0)
2017–2020	Munster	13	(0)
2020–2021	Jersey Reds	10	(5)
2020	→ Leinster (loan)	3	(5)
2021–2023	London Irish	6	(0)
2023–	Cardiff Rugby	0	(0)
- Correct as of 11 December 2021
International career
Years	Team	Apps	(Points)
- England U18
2015	England U20	9	(0)
- Correct as of 13 August 2016

Ciaran Parker (born 5 October 1995) is an English rugby union player. He plays as a prop for Cardiff Rugby.

== Professional career ==
=== Sale Sharks ===
Parker made his full debut for Sale on 17 January 2015, when he was used as a replacement in their 2014–15 Champions Cup Round 5 defeat at the hands of French side Clermont Auvergne. For the 2016–17 season, he was dual-registered with Championship side Yorkshire Carnegie.

=== Munster ===
Parker joined Irish Pro14 and European Rugby Champions Cup side Munster on a one-year development contract in August 2017. Though Parker has previously represented England at underage level, he was qualified to play for Ireland. Parker made his competitive debut for Munster on 1 September 2017, coming off the bench against Benetton in round 1 of the 2017–18 Pro14.

He extended his development contract with Munster for a further season in March 2018, and made his Champions Cup debut for the province on 9 December 2018, featuring off the bench in their 30–5 win against French pool 2 opponents Castres. He signed a contract extension with Munster in February 2019, a deal that saw Parker progress to a senior contract for the 2019–20 season.

=== Jersey Reds ===
After being released by Munster, Parker joined RFU Championship side Jersey Reds ahead of the 2020–21 season.

=== Loan to Leinster ===
Parker joined Irish province Leinster, who play in the United Rugby Championship and Champions Cup, on a three-month loan in September 2020.

=== London Irish ===
Parker joined Premiership Rugby club London Irish, where former Munster head coach Declan Kidney is the current director of rugby, in October 2021.
