= Zac Nearchou =

English rugby union player

- Born: 16 November 2000 (age 25) Reading, England
- Height: 1.78 m (5 ft 10 in)
- Weight: 125 kg (19 st 10 lb)

Rugby union career
- Position: Prop
- Current team: Cambridge
Youth career
- Henley Hawks
- –: Wasps
- –: Radley College
Senior career
Years	Team	Apps	(Points)
2020−	Wasps	4	
2020−2021	→Benetton	4	(0)
- Correct as of 26 Feb 2021
International career
Years	Team	Apps	(Points)
2018	England Under 18		
- Correct as of 29 Nov 2020

Zac Nearchou (born Reading, 16 November 2000) is an English rugby union player. His usual position is as a Prop and he currently plays for Championship Rugby team Rotherham.

In 2020-21 season, he played, on loan, with Italian Pro14 team Benetton.

He was educated at Radley College, Oxford.

Nearchou can also operate at hooker and has represented England at Under 18s and Under 19s levels.
