= Sam Aspland-Robinson =

English rugby union player

- Born: Samuel Frederick Stanislaus Aspland-Robinson; 3 January 1997 (age 29) Stoke Mandeville, Buckinghamshire, England
- Height: 6 ft 0 in (1.83 m)
- Weight: 207 lb (14 st 11 lb; 94 kg)

Rugby union career
- Position(s): Wing, centre
Senior career
Years	Team	Apps	(Points)
2015–2018	Harlequins	1	(0)
2015–2016	Worthing	13	(20)
2016–2017	Rosslyn Park	12	(5)
2018–2022	Leicester Tigers	14	(0)
2021–2022	Coventry (loan)	11	(20)
- Correct as of 2 July 2022
International career
Years	Team	Apps	(Points)
2016–2017	England U20	6	(15)

Samuel Frederick Stanislaus Aspland-Robinson (born 3 January 1997) is an English rugby union player. His usual positions are wing or centre. He represented England under-20s six times between 2016 and 2017. Aspland-Robinson is currently unattached, most recently playing for Coventry in the RFU Championship, on loan from Leicester Tigers in Premiership Rugby. He previously played for Harlequins.

== Career ==
Aspland-Robinson signed for Harlequins straight from school and initially went on loan to Worthing. He played for England under-20s in the 2016 World Rugby Under 20 Championship, including starting the final where England beat Ireland.

Aspland-Robinson signed a new contract with Harlequins on 22 March 2017, but then missed a year with an anterior cruciate ligament injury resulting in him joining Leicester Tigers in the summer of 2018.

Aspland-Robinson made his Leicester debut on 12 January 2019 in a Champions Cup match against Scarlets in Llanelli.

In March 2021, he was signed by Coventry on a deal which would see him remain dual registered with Leicester Tigers. On 14 July 2021 it was announced Aspland-Robinson would remain with Coventry on a season-long loan for the 2021–22 RFU Championship season.

On 1 July 2022, Aspland-Robinson was released by Leicester.
