= Ryan Bower =

English rugby union player (born 1991)

- Born: Ryan Thomas Eyre Bower; 25 February 1991 (age 35) Nuneaton, England
- Height: 1.83 m (6 ft 0 in)
- Weight: 114 kg (17 st 13 lb)
- School: John Cleveland College

Rugby union career
- Position: Loosehead Prop
- Current team: Dallas Jackals
Amateur team(s)
Years	Team	Apps	(Points)
- Hinckley RFC
Senior career
Years	Team	Apps	(Points)
2010–2014	Leicester Tigers	9	(0)
2011–2013	→ Nottingham	64	(5)
2014–2020	Worcester Warriors	106	(10)
2020―2021	Leicester Tigers	9	(0)
2021	London Irish		
2022	Dallas Jackals	16	(0)
2010–	Total	204	(15)
- Correct as of 6 February 2022
International career
Years	Team	Apps	(Points)
2011	England U20		
2014	RFU Championship XV		
- Correct as of 20 February 2016

Ryan Thomas Eyre Bower (born 25 February 1991) is an English professional rugby union player for Dallas Jackals in the US competition Major League Rugby. He has played for Leicester Tigers, Worcester Warriors and London Irish in Premiership Rugby, and for Nottingham in the RFU Championship. Bower's principal position is loosehead prop.

== Club career ==
Bower made his Leicester Tigers debut against the Ospreys in LV= Cup at Bridgend in November 2010. As well as working with the senior squad at Welford Road, he played on loan with Nottingham in the RFU Championship in both 2011-12 and 2012-13 seasons. On 29 April 2014, Bower signed a permanent deal with Worcester Warriors from the 2014-15 season.

On 6 August 2020, Bower re-signed with Leicester Tigers ahead of the 2020-21 season, but after four appearances was released on 16 June 2021.

He joined London Irish as a short term signing on 25 August 2021, the length of the deal was not disclosed. In 2022 Bower joined the Dallas Jackals in Major League Rugby for their inaugural season.

After Bower announced his retirement, he has gone onto coach West Midlands academy as forwards and defence coach. This was then closed down in 2024, he then joined Hartpury University R.F.C. as a scrum & breakdown coach in Champ Rugby. and Gloucester as an academy forwards coach.

== International career ==
Bower made his England Under-20s debut against Wales U20s in the 2011 Six Nations Under 20s Championship. He was also part of England for the 2011 IRB Junior World Championship. He was part of a RFU Championship XV team that defeated Canada 28-23 as part of their 2014 autumn tests, which was held at the Sixways Stadium in Worcester.
