= Josh Gray (rugby union, born 2001) =

English rugby union player (born 2001)

- Born: Josh Gray; 7 July 2001 (age 25) Cheltenham, England
- Height: 1.90 m (6 ft 3 in)
- Weight: 113 kg (17 st 11 lb)
- School: Dean Close School

Rugby union career
- Position: Flanker / Number 8
Senior career
Years	Team	Apps	(Points)
2019-2023/2025	Gloucester	9	(5)
2020-2021	Hartpury (loan)	3	(0)
2021-2022	Hartpury (loan)	19	(15)
2022-2023	Jersey Reds (loan)	12	(0)
2023-	Hartpury	38	(15)
- Correct as of 20 April 2025
International career
Years	Team	Apps	(Points)
2018–2019	England U18	5	(0)
2019–2021	England U20	5	(0)
- Correct as of 17 July 2021

Josh Gray (born 7 July 2001) is an English rugby union player for Hartpury University R.F.C. in the RFU Championship. Gray can play across the back-row.

== Early life ==
Gray started playing rugby at five years old at Salisbury RFC then to Cirencester RFC until U13 returning to Salisbury at U14 winning the U14 Dorset and Wilts County Cup. Gray was also in the Swindon Town Football Junior Academy U7-U9 but declined a junior contract to focus on rugby.

As a teenager Gray continued with several sports playing representative level for Gloucestershire County Cricket U12-U15 (top-order batsman and wicket keeper) and Wiltshire County Elite Golf Squad U12-U15. Gray also participated in Ian Poulter's Invitational at the Marquess Golf Course at Woburn Golf and Country Club. He joined the Gloucester Rugby Academy as part of the U13 DPP and progressed through to Gloucester U18s playing in two Academy league finals in 2018 and 2019.

Gray studied at Dean Close School and Director of Rugby, Andrew Stanley (ex-Gloucester back-row player) supported his rugby development at school. Gray was offered a contract with Gloucester Rugby in 2019.

== Club career ==
At the age of 18, Gray made his debut for Gloucester in the Premiership Rugby Cup before making his Premiership debut against Saracens at the age of 19 years and 50 days, the youngest back-row player and second youngest forward to start for Gloucester.

Gray scored his first Premiership try for Gloucester against Exeter.

Gray was dual-registered with RFU Championship side Hartpury for the 2020-2021 and the 2021–2022 season.

Gray signed a season-long loan to Jersey Reds for the 2022–2023 season who went on to win the RFU Championship league.

== International career ==
Gray was selected for an England U18 development camp in November 2018 and subsequently selected in the 2019 U18 Six Nations squad playing in five matches. Gray was selected for an England Men U20s development camp. and subsequently selected in the England Rugby U20s Elite Player Squad for the 2020 Six Nations and the World Rugby 2020 Championship in Italy. He played in two matches in the Six Nations. before both the U20s Six Nations and World Rugby U20s Championship were cancelled due to COVID-19.

In February 2020, Gray was invited to train with the senior England squad along with six other U20s at the Lensbury and the open training session at Twickenham Stadium.

Gray played three times in the England U20's 2021 Grand Slam win in the U20s Six Nations in Cardiff.
