= Tim Hoyt =

Fiji international rugby union player

- Born: Tim Hoyt; 31 March 2003 (age 23) London, England
- Height: 1.89 m (6 ft 2 in)
- Weight: 125 kg (19 st 10 lb)
- School: Brooksby Melton College

Rugby union career
- Position: Prop
- Current team: Worcester Warriors
Senior career
Years	Team	Apps	(Points)
2019–2025	Leicester Tigers	8	(0)
2021–2023	→ Nottingham (loan)	2	(0)
2024–2025	→ Chinnor (loan)	7	(0)
2025–	Worcester Warriors	13	(0)
- Correct as of 15 March 2026
International career
Years	Team	Apps	(Points)
2022–2023	England U20	7	(0)
2025–	Fiji	2	(0)
- Correct as of 15 March 2026

Tim Hoyt (born 31 March 2003) is a professional rugby union player who plays as a prop for Worcester Warriors in Champ Rugby. He previously played for Leicester Tigers in Premiership Rugby. Born in England, Hoyt represents Fiji at international level after qualifying on ancestry grounds.

== Club career ==
Hoyt came through the Brooksby Melton College programme. On 21 June 2021, Hoyt was one of four graduates to the senior squad for Leicester Tigers from the 2021–22 season.

Hoyt made his club debut against London Irish off the bench in the fifth round of the Premiership Rugby Cup in March 2022. Hoyt also made appearances for Nottingham in the RFU Championship making his debut against Caldy in September 2022. Additionally, Hoyt made appearances for Chinnor, where he made his debut against Coventry in October 2024.

In May 2025 it was announced that Hoyt had left Leicester to join Worcester Warriors.

== International career ==
=== England youth ===
In October 2020, Hoyt was part of an England Rugby Under-18 North development camp. He represented England U20s during the 2022 Six Nations Under 20s Championship, starting at tighthead against Ireland and France. He also played in every round of the 2023 Six Nations Under 20s Championship.

=== Fiji ===
Hoyt qualifies to represent Fiji through a Fijian parent. He was selected for the 2025 end-of-year rugby union internationals and made his senior international debut as a substitute for Fiji in their defeat to France at Stade Atlantique on 15 November 2025.
