= Dan Richardson =

English rugby union player

- Born: Daniel Richardson; 25 March 1996 (age 30) Penrith, Cumbria, England
- Height: 1.85 m (6 ft 1 in)
- Weight: 119 kg (18 st 10 lb; 262 lb)
- School: Lime House School; Ullswater Community College
- University: Leeds Beckett University

Rugby union career
- Position: Prop
- Current team: Nottingham
Amateur team(s)
| Years | Team | Apps | (Points) |
| – | Penrith | | |
- Correct as of 10 September 2021
Senior career
| Years | Team | Apps | (Points) |
| 2017–2018 | Fylde | | |
| 2018–2019 | Rotherham Titans | | |
| 2019–2021 | Jersey Reds | 9 | (0) |
| 2021–2024 | Leicester Tigers | 18 | (0) |
| 2024– | Nottingham | | |
- Correct as of 28 July 2024

Dan Richardson (born 25 March 1996) is an English rugby union player who plays for Nottingham in the RFU Championship, he previously played for Leicester Tigers in Premiership Rugby.

== Career ==
The loosehead prop played junior rugby with his home-town club at Penrith in Cumbria before representing Leeds Beckett University, where he studied Sports and Exercise Science. Ahead of the 2017/18 season, he joined National One side Fylde and then spent a season with Rotherham Titans in National League 1.

On 19 March 2019, Richardson moved to the RFU Championship with Jersey Reds ahead of the 2019–20 season. On 9 July 2021, Richardson makes his move to Premiership Rugby with Leicester Tigers ahead of the 2021–22 season.

Richardson made his Leicester debut on 13 November 2021 as a second half substitute in a Premiership Rugby Cup win against Sale Sharks at Welford Road. He made his first Premiership start on 26 January 2024 in a 20-19 win against Harlequins at the Stoop.

On 23 May 2024 Richardson was announced as a new signing for Nottingham.
