= Joe Browning =

American vaudeville comedian (1880–1957)

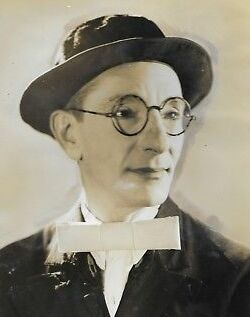
- Browning in 1931
- Born: Joseph Levy Browning; July 28, 1880; New York City, U.S.
- Died: November 14, 1957 (aged 77); Miami, Florida, U.S.
- Occupation: Vaudeville performer
- Relatives: Richard Benjamin (nephew)

Joseph Levy Browning (July 28, 1880 – November 14, 1957) was an American vaudeville comedian.

== Life and career ==
He was born in New York City, the son of Russian Jewish immigrants. By 1908, he was performing in vaudeville as part of a blackface minstrel group that also included Willard Terre, Frank Carlton, and Al Lavan. When the group split up, he formed a duo with Lavan, performing parodies and sketches, and then partnered Henry Lewis from around 1910 to 1915 in an act called "The Explorers" featuring crosstalk and songs.

For the rest of his career, Browning presented comic monologues and songs as a solo performer. In 1919, it was said that: "His material is bright and witty and is delivered with such telling effect that not one point went amiss. The songs and monologue are augmented with a smile that never failed and Browning worked a broad grin to perfection...". He appeared in a revue, The Midnight Rounders of 1921, at the Shubert Theatre on Broadway, and wrote sketches performed by others, such as "Seminary Mary" performed by Henry Bergman and Gladys Clark in 1923. His best known performances were as a pompous and sanctimonious preacher. He recorded a Vitaphone short film, "The Reformer", in 1927, and re-recorded the sketch, along with "Hallelujah", for Columbia Records the following year. In 1935, he appeared in a film, Meet the Professor. In the 1950 census, he described himself as an actor, working in television.

He died in Miami, Florida, in 1957, at the age of 77. His nephew is the actor Richard Benjamin.
