= Todd Gleave =

English rugby union player

- Born: Todd Gleave; 3 June 1995 (age 31) Haywards Heath, Sussex, England
- Height: 1.80 m (5 ft 11 in)
- Weight: 97 kg (15 st 4 lb; 214 lb)
- School: Imberhorne School

Rugby union career
- Position: Hooker
Amateur team(s)
Years	Team	Apps	(Points)
- East Grinstead
Senior career
Years	Team	Apps	(Points)
2014–2016	Bath	0	(0)
2014–2015	→ London Scottish	1	(0)
2015	→ Rosslyn Park	0	(0)
2015–2018	London Irish	20	(0)
2018–	Gloucester	25	(5)
2021	→ Ospreys	1	(0)
2022–	Dallas Jackals		
- Correct as of 23 December 2021

Todd Gleave (born 3 June 1995) is an English rugby union player who plays for Dallas Jackals in the Major League Rugby.

Gleave played his early rugby at East Grinstead. He was previously part Bath academy before he joined London Scottish ahead of the 2014–15 season to play in the RFU Championship.

He played in National League 1 for Rosslyn Park in the 2014–15 season, before being snapped up by London Irish ahead of the 2015–16 season. On 12 June 2018, Gleave signed for Gloucester from the 2018–19 season.

Gleave worked in digital marketing at the F3Group, who are the primary sponsors of Gloucester, where his father is their chief executive.

On 17 April 2021, Gleave has signed for Welsh region Ospreys on loan for the Pro14 Rainbow Cup for the rest of the 2020–21 season

On 13 December 2021, Gleave left Gloucester with immediate effect to sign for USA based Dallas Jackals in the Major League Rugby competition.
