= Harry Simmons (rugby union) =

Retired English rugby union player

- Born: Harry Andrew Simmons; 25 November 1997 (age 28) Norwich, England
- Height: 5 ft 11 in (180 cm)
- Weight: 198 lb (90 kg)
- School: Gresham's School

Rugby union career
- Position: Scrum half/wing
Senior career
| Years | Team | Apps | (Points) |
| 2016–2017 | Loughborough Students | 18 | (35) |
| 2017–2023 | Leicester Tigers | 39 | (30) |
| 2021–2022 | →Jersey Reds | 11 | (15) |
- Correct as of 4 February 2024

Harry Andrew Simmons (born 25 November 1997) is a retired English rugby union scrum half or wing who played for Leicester Tigers in Premiership Rugby. Born in Norwich Simmons first played rugby for Gresham’s School and Holt RFC in Norfolk before gaining experience at Loughborough Students. His regular playing positions were scrum half and Wing.

== Career ==
Simmons made his Leicester Tigers debut at scrum half on 4 November 2017 against Gloucester in the Anglo-Welsh Cup at Welford Road, the next week against Bath he moved to full back. He made his Champions Cup debut in France against Castres in January and scored his first two tries for Leicester in the Anglo-Welsh Cup game against Wasps at the Ricoh Arena on 4 February 2018.

On 7 July 2021 Simmons joined Jersey Reds on a season long loan arrangement. Simmons scored a hat trick on 19 March 2022 again Coventry. Simmons re-newed his Leicester contract on 12 May 2022.

On 11 December 2024 Simmons announced his retirement following an eye injured sustained in January 2024, that he was unable to satisfactorily recover from.
