= Kyle Stewart (rugby union) =

New Zealand rugby union player (born 1997)

- Born: 10 March 1997 (age 29) New Zealand
- Height: 1.83 m (6 ft 0 in)
- Weight: 120 kg (19 st; 260 lb)

Rugby union career
- Position: Prop
Senior career
Years	Team	Apps	(Points)
2018–2019	Taranaki	15	(0)
2019–2020	Rugby Lyons Piacenza	7	(5)
2020	Manawatu	8	(0)
2021–	Taranaki	10	(0)
2022–	Old Glory DC	11	(0)
- Correct as of 28 April 2022

Kyle Stewart (born 10 March 1997) is a New Zealand rugby union player, currently playing for the Old Glory DC of Major League Rugby (MLR) and Taranaki in the National Provincial Championship. His preferred position is prop.

== Professional career ==
Stewart signed for Major League Rugby side Old Glory DC for the 2022 Major League Rugby season. He has also previously played for Taranaki, making his debut in the 2018 Mitre 10 Cup, Manawatu and Rugby Lyons Piacenza before rejoining Taranaki for the 2021 Bunnings NPC.
