= List of 2026–27 Champ Rugby transfers =

This is a list of player transfers involving Champ Rugby teams before or during the 2026–27 season. It is not unknown for confirmed deals to be cancelled at a later date.

Blackheath and Rotherham Titans are promoted to the Champ Rugby for the 2026-27 season whilst Cambridge and London Scottish are demoted to National League 1 competition for the 2026-27 season.

== Ampthill ==
=== Players in ===
- (England) Jack Kinder from (England) Leicester Tigers
- (England) Elliot Gourlay from (England) Loughborough Students RUFC
- (England) Harry Silman from (Wales) Cardiff Metropolitan University
- (England) Oscar Bennett from (England) University of Bath
- (England) Tobias Trafford from (England) University of Birmingham
- (England) George Nugent from (England) Richmond
- (England) Tom Gulley from (England) University of Exeter
- (England) Ed Timpson from (United States) California Legion
- (England) Jimmy Thompson from (England) Cambridge
- (England) Raff Weston from (England) Bristol Bears
- (England) Toby Baker from (England) Bristol Bears
- (England) Jody Devine from (England) Leeds Beckett University
- (Ireland) Jamie Fallon from (England) London Scottish
- (England) Theo Mannion from (England) Leicester Lions
- (South Africa) Michael Chettoa from (South Africa) Maties
- (England) Joe Browning from (Australia) Randwick

=== Players out ===
- (England) Josh Barton (released)
- (Scotland) Mason Cullen (released)
- (England) Alex Davies (released)
- (England) Louis Grimoldby (retired)
- (England) Dom Hardman (released)
- (Ireland) Rory Morgan (released)
- (Scotland) Callum Norrie (released)
- (England) Jake Parkinson to (England) Cambridge
- (Samoa) James Johnston to (England) Chinnor
- (England) Fraser Stratchan to (England) Oundle
- (England) Matt Salisbury to (England) Leeds Tykes
- (England) Wilson Ijeh to (England) Blackheath
- (Tonga) Sione Va'enuku to (England) Saracens
- (Fiji) Lekima Ravuvu to (England) Rotherham Titans
- (England) Sam Kildunne to (England) Doncaster Knights

== Bedford Blues ==
=== Players in ===
- (England) Dan Eckersby from (England) Cambridge
- (Wales) Will Davies-King from (Wales) Cardiff
- (England) Marcus Kershaw from (United Kingdom) Great Britain Sevens
- (Australia) Ben Dufficy from (New Zealand) Taranaki

=== Players out ===
- (England) Archie Hosking (released)
- (England) Rafe Witheat (released)
- (England) Joe Hill to (England) Cambridge

== Blackheath ==
=== Players in ===
- (England) Ehize Ehizode from (England) Doncaster Knights
- (England) Ben Chapman from (England) Doncaster Knights
- (England) Nick Cook from (England) Westcombe Park
- (England) Tom Kendrick from (England) Tonbridge Juddians
- (England) Noah Ferdinand from (England) London Scottish
- (Wales) Iwan Price-Thomas from (England) Cornish Pirates
- (England) Seb Brownhill from (England) Richmond
- (South Africa) Ronnie du Randt from (England) Richmond
- (New Zealand) Kegan Christian-Goss from (England) Nottingham
- (England) Mikel Davies from (England) Westcombe Park
- (England) Tom Everard from (Australia) Northern Suburbs
- (England) Andrew Denham from (England) Bury St Edmunds
- (England) Joel Grayson from (England) Newcastle Red Bulls
- (England) Timur Gecer from (England) London Scottish
- (England) Wilson Ijeh from (England) Ampthill
- (New Zealand) Harry Taylor from (England) Ealing Trailfinders
- (England) Kieran Curran from (Australia) Northern Suburbs
- (Fiji) Taitusi Qaniuci from (England) Cambridge
- (England) Max Blinkhorn from (England) University of Nottingham
- (England) Michael Etete from (England) Nottingham
- (Canada) Sam Miller from (Australia) Southern Districts
- (Canada) Kyle Steeves from (Australia) Hunter Wildfires
- (England) Zak Farrance from (France) Nevers

=== Players out ===
- (England) Jake Lloyd (retired)
- (England) Markus Burcham (retired)
- (England) Finn Osbourne to (England) Dorking

== Caldy ==
=== Players in ===
- (England) Harry Oliver from (England) Macclesfield
- (England) Rhys James from (England) Wirral
- (England) Oliver Barker from (England) University of Nottingham
- (England) Charlie Ford from (England) Chester
- (England) Ben Parkin from (England) Leeds Beckett University

=== Players out ===
- (England) Kieran Wilkinson to (England) Doncaster Knights
- (England) Lewis Barker (retired)
- (England) Sam Olyott (released)
- (England) Tom Sanders (released)
- (England) Michael Barlow to (England) Sandbach

== Chinnor ==
=== Players in ===
- (Samoa) James Johnston from (England) Ampthill
- (Australia) Liam Richman from (Italy) Petrarca
- (England) Harry Gilson-Fox from (England) Rotherham Titans
- (Fiji) George Wacokecoke from (England) Camborne
- (South Africa) Josh du Toit from (South Africa) University of Johannesburg
- (South Africa) Ben Currie from (England) Cambridge
- (Scotland) Richie Simpson from (England) Ealing Trailfinders
- (England) Jack Metcalf from (France) Rouen
- (England) Olly Wyman from (Wales) Cardiff Metropolitan University
- (England) Andy Darlington from (England) Macclesfield

== Cornish Pirates ==
=== Players in ===
- (United States) Tomiwa Agbongbon from (England) Ealing Trailfinders
- (England) Finn Love from (England) Camborne
- (Australia) Hugh Bokenham from (England) Gloucester
- (England) Matt Cannon from (England) Ealing Trailfinders
- (England) Jack Forsythe from (England) Exeter Chiefs
- (England) Harry Ascherl from (England) Exeter Chiefs
- (England) Barnaby Elderkin (unattached)
- (England) Will Beconnsall from (England) Exeter Chiefs
- (England) Steele Barker from (England) Bristol Bears
- (Australia) Jamie Clark from (England) Newcastle Red Bulls
- (Ireland) Alessandro Heaney from (United States) Anthem RC
- (Australia) Henry Palmer from (Australia) Western Force
- (Scotland) Josh Radcliffe from (United Kingdom) Great Britain Sevens
- (Australia) Dan O'Brien from (Australia) Randwick

=== Players out ===
- (England) Ollie Andrews (released)
- (Wales) Ben Cambriani (released)
- (Australia) Rory Suttor (released)
- (England) Matty Ward to (England) Nottingham
- (Wales) Iwan Price-Thomas to (England) Blackheath
- (England) John Stevens (retired)
- (England) Charlie Rice to (France) Chambery
- (England) Will Rigelsford to (England) London Scottish

== Coventry ==
=== Players in ===
- (Zimbabwe) Matthew McNab from (England) Doncaster Knights
- (Scotland) Rhys Tait from (England) Doncaster Knights
- (Zimbabwe) Bruce Houston from (France) Bourg-en-Bressane
- (England) Marcus Rhodes from (England) Durham University
- (South Africa) Rhys Fulford from (England) Cambridge
- (England) Alex Garrett from (England) Nottingham
- (England) Joe Margetts from (England) Doncaster Knights
- (England) Tumy Onasanya from (England) Sale Sharks
- (Spain) Jono Benz-Salomon from (England) Gloucester
- (England) Ethan Hunt from (England) Hartpury University
- (New Zealand) Suetena Asomua from (France) Valence Romans

=== Players out ===
- (Scotland) Allan Ferrie to (England) Newcastle Red Bulls
- (England) David Opoku-Fordjour to (England) Sale Sharks
- (England) Suva Ma'asi (retired)
- (England) Chester Owen (released)
- (England) Morgan Adderly-Jones to (England) Nottingham
- (England) Ewan Baker to (England) Oundle
- (England) Toby Trinder to (England) Oundle
- (Ireland) Oli Morris to Oundle
- (England) Dylan Morris to (England) Trinity Guild
- (England) Eliot Salt to (England) Gloucester

== Doncaster Knights ==
=== Players in ===
- (England) Callum Hancock from (England) Newcastle Red Bulls
- (England) Connor Hancock from (England) Newcastle Red Bulls
- (England) Hsrry Yates from (England) Ealing Trailfinders
- (England) Nathan Langdon from (England) Sale FC
- (Samoa) Paul Masoe from (England) Cambridge
- (England) Louie Kirkham from (England) Leeds Beckett University
- (England) Jake Ellwood from (England) Cambridge
- (England) Kieran Wilkinson from (England) Caldy
- (England) Max Allen-Paver from (England) Leeds Beckett University
- (England) Ben Sugars from (United States) California Legion
- (Scotland) Corey Tait from (Scotland) Selkirk
- (New Zealand) Tololima Savaiinaea from (England) Richmond
- (England) Ben Glanville from (England) University of Nottingham
- (England) Penaia Tagutu from (England) British Army
- (England) Bailey Ransom from (England) London Scottish
- (Australia) Aidan King from (United States) Old Glory DC
- (New Zealand) Angus Williams from (Scotland) Edinburgh
- (England) Sam Kildunne from (England) Ampthill
- (England) Tom Curtis from (England) Sale Sharks
- (England) Alex Wardell from (England) London Scottish

=== Players out ===
- (Australia) Conor Davidson (retired)
- (England) Thom Smith (retired)
- (England) Lewis Thiede (retired)
- (England) Josh Williams (retired)
- (Wales) Connor Edwards to (Wales) Pontypool
- (Zimbabwe) Matthew McNab to (England) Coventry
- (Scotland) Rhys Tait to (England) Coventry
- (England) Joe Margetts to (England) Coventry
- (England) Ehize Ehizode to (England) Blackheath
- (England) Ben Chapman to (England) Blackheath
- (England) Russell Bennett to (England) Rotherham Titans
- (Wales) Morgan Jones to (Wales) Llandovery

== Ealing Trailfinders ==
=== Players in ===
- (England) Louie Johnson from (England) Saracens
- (England) Gareth Simpson from (England) Saracens
- (England) Sam Grahamslaw from (England) Bristol Bears
- (England) Max Nagy from (Wales) Ospreys
- (England) Hayden Hyde from (England) Harlequins
- (England) Freddie Stevenson from (England) Plymouth Albion
- (Ireland) James Humphreys from (Ireland) Ulster
- (Ireland) Jack Kelleher from (Ireland) Cork Constitution
- (Ireland) Fionn Gibbons from (Ireland) Munster
- (South Africa) Jarrod Taylor from (Wales) Scarlets
- (France) Louis Finch from (France) Mont-de-Marsan
- (England) Jacob Morris from (England) Gloucester
- (England) Mikey Summerfield from (England) Bath
- (England) Emeka Atuanya from (England) Northampton Saints
- (England) Fyn Brown from (England) Northampton Saints
- (Wales) Tom Florence from (Wales) Ospreys
- (England) Oscar Stott from (England) Nottingham

=== Players out ===
- (England) Tobi Wilson to (England) Bristol Bears
- (South Africa) Lefty Zigiriadis to (England) Northampton Saints
- (England) Harry Yates to (England) Doncaster Knights
- (Scotland) Geordie Gwynn to (Scotland) Edinburgh
- (United States) Tomiwa Agbongbon to (England) Cornish Pirates
- (England) Matt Cannon to (England) Cornish Pirates
- (Scotland) Josh Taylor to (England) Northampton Saints
- (England) Danny Cutmore (released)
- (England) Sam Edwards (released)
- (England) Rob Farrar (retired)
- (South Africa) Jordan Holgate (retired)
- (England) James Kenny to (England) Plymouth Albion
- (New Zealand) Harry Taylor to (England) Blackheath
- (England) George Worboys to (New Zealand) Manawatu
- (England) Josh Caulfield to (England) Bristol Bears
- (Scotland) Richie Simpson to (England) Chinnor

== Hartpury University ==
=== Players in ===
- (Wales) Harrison James from (Wales) Cardiff Metropolitan University
- (England) Ollie Smith from (Wales) Cardiff Metropolitan University

=== Players out ===
- (England) Ethan Hunt to (England) Coventry
- (Scotland) Monty Oliver to (England) Worcester Warriors

== Nottingham ==
=== Players in ===
- (England) Matty Ward from (England) Cornish Pirates
- (England) Morgan Adderly-Jones from (England) Coventry
- (Fiji) Simon Koroiyadi from (Italy) Benetton
- (England) Will Ramply from (England) Nottingham Trent University
- (England) Oli Crane from (England) Leicester Lions
- (England) Oran Murphy from (England) Loughborough Students RUFC
- (England) Harry Clarke (unattached)
- (England) Matthew Gould from (England) Nottingham Trent University
- (England) Cieran Barry from (England) Nottingham Trent University
- (Canada) Spencer Jones from (New Zealand) Hamilton Old Boys

=== Players out ===
- (England) Jack Dickinson to (England) Worcester Warriors
- (New Zealand) Kegan Christian-Goss to (England) Blackheath
- (England) Ben Brownlie (retired)
- (England) Michael Etete (released)
- (England) Sam Mercer (released)
- (England) Jack Stapley (released)
- (England) James Cherry to (England) Worcester Warriors
- (England) Alex Garrett to (England) Coventry
- (England) Oscar Stott to (England) Ealing Trailfinders
- (England) Michael Etete to (England) Blackheath
- (England) Josh Goodwin to (Hong Kong) HKFC

== Richmond ==
=== Players in ===
- (England) Tom Riman from (England) Loughborough Students RUFC
- (England) Fergus Dick from (England) Oxford University
- Cody Mitchell from New Zealand Ambassadors XV
- (England) Conor Oresanya from (England) Leeds Beckett University
- (England) Austin Hay from (England) London Scottish
- (England) Charlie Bell from (England) Exeter Chiefs
- (England) Rowan Grundy from (England) Rams
- (England) James Beverley from (England) University of Bath
- (England) Eric Nixon from (England) Loughborough Students RUFC
- (England) Hugo Culverhouse from (England) Tonbridge Juddians
- (England) Ben Wright from (England) Newcastle University
- (England) Boris Ames from (England) Durham University
- (England) Sam Reynolds from (Japan) Maruwa Logistar'z Kyoto

=== Players out ===
- (England) Seb Brownhill to (England) Blackheath
- (South Africa) Ronnie du Randt to (England) Blackheath
- (England) Hamish Murray to (England) Tonbridge Juddians
- (New Zealand) Tololima Savaiinaea to (England) Doncaster Knights
- (England) George Nugent to (England) Ampthill

== Rotherham Titans ==
=== Players in ===
- (England) Alfie Bell from (England) Exeter Chiefs
- (England) Russell Bennett from (England) Doncaster Knights
- (England) Zac Nearchou from (England) Cambridge
- (New Zealand) James Brown from (Wales) RGC 1404
- (England) Jack Howells from (England) Loughborough Students RUFC
- (England) Tom Threlfall from (England) Leicester Tigers
- (Fiji) Lekima Ravuvu from (England) Ampthill
- (South Africa) Brent Jackson from (Scotland) Glasgow Warriors

=== Players out ===
- (England) Harry Gilson-Fox to (England) Chinnor
- (Scotland) Noah Cowan to (England) Worcester Warriors

== Worcester Warriors ==
=== Players in ===
- (Wales) Joe Jones from (England) Harlequins
- (England) Jack Dickinson from (England) Nottingham
- (Wales) Owain Evans from (England) Loughborough Students RUFC
- (England) Cameron Miell from (England) Leicester Tigers
- (England) John Hawkins from (England) Newcastle Red Bulls
- (England) James Cherry from (England) Nottingham
- (Scotland) Charlie Chapman from (England) Exeter Chiefs
- (England) Zach Armstrong from (Wales) Cardiff Metropolitan University
- (Scotland) Lochie Glackin from (England) Leicester Tigers
- (England) Jack Hopson from (France) Valence Romans
- (Scotland) Monty Oliver from (England) Hartpury University
- (England) Tom Savage from (New Zealand) Moana Pasifika
- (England) Kofi Cripps from (England) Bristol Bears
- (Scotland) Noah Cowan from (England) Rotherham Titans

=== Players out ===
- (England) Khalik Kareem to (England) Bristol Bears
- (New Zealand) Tom Hendrickson to (France) Biarritz
- (Fiji) Tim Hoyt to (France) Lyon
- (England) Chris Preen to (England) Plymouth Albion
- (England) Matt Rogerson (retired)
- (Wales) Tom Golder to (England) London Scottish
- (Scotland) Callum Smyth to (England) Cambridge
- (South Africa) Thabo Ndimande to (South Africa) Pumas
- (England) Obinna Nkwocha to (England) Exeter Chiefs

== See also ==
- List of 2026–27 Premiership Rugby transfers
- List of 2026–27 United Rugby Championship transfers
- List of 2026–27 Super Rugby transfers
- List of 2026–27 Top 14 transfers
- List of 2026–27 Rugby Pro D2 transfers
- List of 2026–27 Major League Rugby transfers
