= List of 2026–27 Premiership Rugby transfers =

This is a list of player transfers involving Premiership Rugby teams before or during the 2026–27 season.

The list consists of deals that have been confirmed and are for players who are moving either from or to one of the 10 rugby union clubs which competed in the Premiership during the 2025–26 season.

It is not unknown for confirmed deals to be cancelled at a later date.

== Bath ==
=== Players in ===
- (South Africa) Dan du Preez from (England) Sale Sharks
- (Scotland) Jamie Bhatti from (Scotland) Glasgow Warriors
- (England) Will Roue (promoted from Academy)
- (Argentina) Marcos Camerlinckx from (Argentina) Pampas XV

=== Players out ===
- (South Africa) Thomas du Toit to (South Africa) Sharks
- (South Africa) Francois van Wyk to (Ireland) Connacht
- (England) Will Butt to (England) Exeter Chiefs
- (England) Ethan Staddon to (England) Bristol Bears
- (England) Alfie Barbeary to (England) Saracens
- (England) Sam Harris to (England) Exeter Chiefs
- (Scotland) Chris Harris to (England) Newcastle Red Bulls
- (England) Harvey Cuckson to (Wales) Scarlets
- (England) Mikey Summerfield to (England) Ealing Trailfinders
- (Wales) Ioan Emanuel to (Wales) Cardiff (season-long loan)

== Bristol Bears ==
=== Players in ===
- (England) Ethan Staddon from (England) Bath
- (England) Khalik Kareem from (England) Worcester Warriors
- (England) Tobi Wilson from (England) Ealing Trailfinders
- (England) Sol Moody from (England) Exeter Chiefs
- (England) Louie Sinclair from (England) Exeter Chiefs
- (England) Josh Caulfield from (England) Ealing Trailfinders
- (Wales) Oscar Lennon from (United States) New England Free Jacks
- (England) Harry Wells from (England) Oundle (short-term deal)
- (England) Max Clark from (England) Newcastle Red Bulls (short-term deal)
- (England) Andrew Turner from (England) Harlequins
- (England) Ben Rogers from (England) Taunton Titans
- (New Zealand) Bryn Gordon from (New Zealand) North Harbour (short-term deal)
- (Samoa) Totoa Auva'a from (England) Saracens

=== Players out ===
- (England) James Dun to (England) Harlequins
- (England) Sam Wolstenholme to (England) Exeter Chiefs
- (England) Joe Jenkins to (England) Leicester Tigers
- (Argentina) Benjamin Elizalde to (England) Newcastle Red Bulls
- (England) Steele Barker to (England) Cornish Pirates
- (England) Will Capon (released)
- (England) John Edwards (released)
- (England) Richard Lane (released)
- (Argentina) Santiago Grondona to (France) Pau
- (England) Sam Grahamslaw to (England) Ealing Trailfinders
- (England) Raff Weston to (England) Ampthill
- (England) Toby Baker to (England) Ampthill
- (England) Kofi Cripps to (England) Worcester Warriors
- (Wales) Louie Trevett to (Wales) Ospreys (short-term loan)

== Exeter Chiefs ==
=== Players in ===
- (Georgia (country)) Nika Abuladze from (France) Montpellier
- (England) Will Butt from (England) Bath
- (England) Harry Wilson from (England) Saracens
- (New Zealand) Dallas McLeod from (New Zealand) Crusaders
- (England) Sam Wolstenholme from (England) Bristol Bears
- (England) Sam Harris from (England) Bath
- (England) Jake Murray from (England) Harlequins
- (England) Obinna Nkwocha from (England) Worcester Warriors
- (England) Archie McArthur from (England) Gloucester
- (New Zealand) Charlie Poynton from (Australia) South Sydney Rabbitohs
- (Wales) Carwyn Tuipulotu from (France) Pau
- (South Africa) Andre Goedhals from (South Africa) Pumas

=== Players out ===
- (Australia) Len Ikitau to (Australia) ACT Brumbies
- (England) Josh Hodge to (England) Newcastle Red Bulls
- (England) Rus Tuima to (England) Newcastle Red Bulls
- (England) Will Rigg to (England) Newcastle Red Bulls
- (England) Sol Moody to (England) Bristol Bears
- (England) Louie Sinclair to (England) Bristol Bears
- (Wales) Christ Tshiunza to (England) Sale Sharks
- (Wales) Iwan Jenkins to (England) Plymouth Albion
- (Samoa) Scott Sio to (Wales) Cardiff
- (England) Jack Forsythe to (England) Cornish Pirates
- (England) Harry Ascherl to (England) Cornish Pirates
- (England) Will Beconnsall to (England) Cornish Pirates
- (South Africa) Kwenzo Blose (released)
- (England) Kian Gentry (released)
- (Wales) Orson James (released)
- (South Africa) Khwezi Mona (released)
- (Scotland) Charlie Chapman to (England) Worcester Warriors
- (Wales) Dan John to (Wales) Ospreys
- (England) Alfie Bell to (England) Rotherham Titans
- (England) Charlie Bell to (England) Richmond
- (New Zealand) Tamati Tua to (Japan) Black Rams Tokyo
- (Ireland) Martin Moloney to (Ireland) Ulster

== Gloucester ==
=== Players in ===
- (Wales) Jac Morgan from (Wales) Ospreys
- (Wales) Dewi Lake from (Wales) Ospreys
- (England) Dan Robson from (France) Pau
- (South Africa) Jean Kleyn from (Ireland) Munster
- (Ireland) Joe Joyce from (Ireland) Connacht
- (England) Phil Cokanasiga from (Wales) Ospreys
- (Samoa) Marco Fepulea'i from (France) Mont-de-Marsan
- (England) Josiah Edwards-Giraud (promoted from Academy)
- (England) Eliot Salt from (England) Coventry
- Halen King from Chiefs (short-term deal) (Note: Short-term deal until the end of November 2026, option to make permanent.)
- Callum McCabe from Chiefs (short-term deal)

=== Players out ===
- (Wales) Tomos Williams to (England) Saracens
- (England) Cam Jordan to (England) Newcastle Red Bulls
- (Australia) Hugh Bokenham to (England) Cornish Pirates
- (England) Josh Basham (retired)
- (Russia) Kirill Gotovtsev (retired)
- (New Zealand) Nepo Laulala (released)
- (England) Will Butler to (England) London Scottish
- (Argentina) Matías Alemanno to (France) Vannes
- (Spain) Jono Benz-Salomon to (England) Coventry
- (England) Jacob Morris to (England) Ealing Trailfinders
- (England) Archie McArthur to (England) Exeter Chiefs
- (Ireland) Rob Russell to (Ireland) Old Belvedere
- (England) Jack Singleton to (Scotland) Glasgow Warriors

== Harlequins ==
=== Players in ===
- (England) James Dun from (England) Bristol Bears
- (South Africa) Sampie Swiegers from (South Africa) Pumas
- (England) George Furbank from (England) Northampton Saints
- (Australia) Harry Johnson-Holmes from (Australia) Western Force
- (Zimbabwe) Edward Sigauke from (South Africa) Varsity College
- (Scotland) James Lang from (Scotland) Edinburgh

=== Players out ===
- (South Africa) Stephan Lewies to (South Africa) Sharks
- (Scotland) George Turner to (England) Newcastle Red Bulls
- (England) Jack Doorey-Palmer to (England) Leicester Tigers
- (England) Jamie Benson to (Ireland) Ulster
- (England) Joe Launchbury (retired)
- (Wales) Joe Jones to (England) Worcester Warriors
- (England) Jake Murray to (England) Exeter Chiefs
- (England) Conor Byrne (released)
- (England) Felix Chapmain (released)
- (Ireland) Cameron Doak (released)
- (Australia) Jack Grant (released)
- (England) Tom Humphreys (released)
- (Wales) Math Jones (released)
- (England) Tom Lawday (retired
- (England) Mattias Woollard (released)
- (England) Hayden Hyde to (England) Ealing Trailfinders
- (England) Max Green to (England) Oundle
- (Wales) Jarrod Evans to (Wales) Cardiff
- (Scotland) Guy Rogers to (Scotland) Glasgow Warriors
- (South Africa) Jordan Els to (England) Northampton Saints
- (England) Andrew Turner to (England) Bristol Bears
- (Wales) Jonny Green to (Wales) Cardiff

== Leicester Tigers ==
=== Players in ===
- (Wales) Aaron Wainwright from (Wales) Dragons
- (England) Elliott Stooke from (Japan) Red Hurricanes Osaka
- (England) Jack Doorey-Palmer from (England) Harlequins
- (England) Joe Jenkins from (England) Bristol Bears
- (Argentina) Joel Sclavi from (France) La Rochelle
- (England) Mako Vunipola from (France) Vannes
- (Tonga) Sam Moli from (New Zealand) Moana Pasifika
- (Australia) Jack Bowen from (Australia) NSW Waratahs
- (Samoa) Richie Asiata from (Australia) Queensland Reds

=== Players out ===
- (England) George Martin to (England) Saracens
- (Wales) Nicky Smith to (England) Sale Sharks
- (South Africa) Hanro Liebenberg to (South Africa) Bulls
- (England) Cameron Miell to (England) Worcester Warriors
- (England) Jack Kinder to (England) Ampthill
- (England) Monty Loggenberg to (France) Beziers
- (England) Tubuna Maka to (France) Beziers
- (Australia) Izaia Perese to (Australia) Queensland Reds
- (England) Tom Threlfall to (England) Rotherham Titans
- (England) John Stewart (released)
- (England) Tom Manz to (Wales) Cardiff (season-long loan)
- (England) Harry Wells to (England) Oundle
- (Australia) James O'Connor to (Australia) Western Force
- (England) Finn Theobald-Thomas (retired)

== Newcastle Red Bulls ==
=== Players in ===
- (New Zealand) Hoskins Sotutu from (New Zealand) Blues
- (England) Josh Hodge from (England) Exeter Chiefs
- (Argentina) Franco Molina from (Australia) Western Force
- (England) Rus Tuima from (England) Exeter Chiefs
- (Scotland) Elliot Millar Mills from (England) Northampton Saints
- (England) Sam Graham from (England) Northampton Saints
- (England) Raffi Quirke from (England) Sale Sharks
- (England) Cam Jordan from (England) Gloucester
- (New Zealand) Pouri Rakete-Stones from (New Zealand) Hurricanes
- (England) Will Rigg from (England) Exeter Chiefs
- (England) Max Hicks from (France) Perpignan
- (England) Zack Henry from (France) Stade Français Paris
- (Scotland) George Turner from (England) Harlequins
- (England) Brandon Jackson from (England) Saracens
- (England) James Harper from (England) Sale Sharks
- (England) Obi Ene from (England) Sale Sharks
- (Scotland) Allan Ferrie from (England) Coventry
- (England) Samson Adejimi from (England) Saracens
- (Argentina) Benjamin Elizalde from (England) Bristol Bears
- (England) Tom West from (England) Northampton Saints
- (Scotland) Chris Harris from (England) Bath
- (South Africa) Werner Kok from (Ireland) Ulster
- (Fiji) Zuriel Togiatama from (Fiji) Fijian Drua
- (Argentina) Francisco Moreno from (Argentina) Tarucas
- (Canada) Mason Flesch from (United States) Chicago Hounds

=== Players out ===
- (England) Callum Hancock to (England) Doncaster Knights
- (England) Connor Hancock to (England) Doncaster Knights
- (Australia) Fergus Lee-Warner to (France) Grenoble
- (England) John Hawkins to (England) Worcester Warriors
- (England) Jack Dickens (released)
- (England) Connor Doherty (released)
- (Scotland) Thomas Gordon (released)
- (Japan) Amanaki Mafi (released)
- (England) Cameron Neild (retired)
- (England) Elliott Obatoyinbo (released)
- (England) Sam Stuart (retired)
- (South Africa) Stefan Coetzee to (South Africa) Griquas
- (England) Tim Cardall to (Japan) Mitsubishi Sagamihara DynaBoars
- (New Zealand) Bryn Gordon to (New Zealand) North Harbour
- (Argentina) Eduardo Bello to (Ireland) Ulster
- (Australia) Jamie Clark to (England) Cornish Pirates
- (England) Junior Newton to (England) Darlington Mowden Park
- (Scotland) Jamie Hodgson (retired)
- (England) Joel Grayson to (England) Blackheath
- (South Africa) Boeta Chamberlain to (South Africa) Lions
- (England) Max Clark to (England) Bristol Bears
- (South Africa) Sebastian de Chaves (retired)
- (South Africa) Luan de Bruin (retired)
- (England) Freddie Clarke (retired)
- (England) Freddie Lockwood to (France) Dax

== Northampton Saints ==
=== Players in ===
- (South Africa) Lefty Zigiriadis from (England) Ealing Trailfinders
- (Scotland) Josh Taylor from (England) Ealing Trailfinders
- (Italy) Malik Faissal from (Italy) Zebre Parma
- (England) Ben Alexander from (England) Old Albanian
- (England) James Bennett from (England) Loughborough Students
- (England) Thomas Rowe from (England) Loughborough Students
- (South Africa) Jordan Els from (England) Harlequins
- (Italy) Ion Neculai from (Italy) Zebre Parma

=== Players out ===
- (Scotland) Elliot Millar Mills to (England) Newcastle Red Bulls
- (England) Sam Graham to (England) Newcastle Red Bulls
- (Australia) James Ramm to (Australia) Western Force
- (England) Tom James to (England) Saracens
- (England) George Furbank to (England) Harlequins
- (England) Jack Lawrence (released)
- (England) Billy Pasco (released)
- (Netherlands) Siep Walta (released)
- (England) Tom West to (England) Newcastle Red Bulls
- (England) Archie Appleby to (Scotland) Edinburgh
- (England) Will Glister to (England) Oundle
- (England) Emeka Atuanya to (England) Ealing Trailfinders
- (England) Fyn Brown to (England) Ealing Trailfinders
- (Italy) Marco Manfredi to (Italy) Valorugby Emilia

== Sale Sharks ==
=== Players in ===
- (England) Joe Marchant from (France) Stade Français Paris
- (Wales) Nicky Smith from (England) Leicester Tigers
- (Wales) Tomas Francis from (France) Provence
- (England) Alex Lozowski from (England) Saracens
- (Fiji) Ponepati Loganimasi from (Fiji) Fijian Drua
- (Fiji) Elia Canakaivata from (Fiji) Fijian Drua
- (South Africa) Cebo Dlamini from (South Africa) Griquas
- (Wales) Christ Tshiunza from (England) Exeter Chiefs
- (England) Courtney Lawes from (France) Brive
- (England) David Opoku-Fordjour from (England) Coventry
- (South Africa) JJ Scheepers from (South Africa) Pumas
- (New Zealand) Xavier Roe from (New Zealand) Chiefs

=== Players out ===
- (South Africa) Rob du Preez to (France) Bayonne
- (England) Raffi Quirke to (England) Newcastle Red Bulls
- (England) James Harper to (England) Newcastle Red Bulls
- (South Africa) Dan du Preez to (England) Bath
- (England) Obi Ene to (England) Newcastle Red Bulls
- (England) Sam Bedlow (retired)
- (England) Frank Chatterton (released)
- (Wales) WillGriff John (released)
- (Ireland) Tadgh McElroy (released)
- (England) Jack Lightbrown (released)
- (England) Nye Thomas (released)
- (Ireland) Will Wootton (released)
- (England) Albert Bradshaw to (England) Leeds Tykes
- (England) Tom Davis to Bahrain RFC
- (South Africa) Hyron Andrews to (South Africa) Lions
- (England) Tumy Onasanya to (England) Coventry
- (England) Joe Bedlow to (England) Sedgley Park
- (Wales) Huw Davies to (Wales) RGC 1404
- (England) Tom Curtis to (England) Doncaster Knights
- (England) Rouban Birch to (England) Stockport

== Saracens ==
=== Players in ===
- (England) George Martin from (England) Leicester Tigers
- (Wales) Tomos Williams from (England) Gloucester
- (England) Alfie Barbeary from (England) Bath
- (England) Tom James from (England) Northampton Saints
- (South Africa) Corné Weilbach from (South Africa) Stormers
- (Tonga) Sione Va'enuku from (England) Ampthill

=== Players out ===
- (England) Tom Willis to (France) Bordeaux
- (England) Alex Lozowski to (England) Sale Sharks
- (England) Brandon Jackson to (England) Newcastle Red Bulls
- (England) Harry Wilson to (England) Exeter Chiefs
- (Italy) Marco Riccioni to (France) Perpignan
- (England) Samson Adejimi to (England) Newcastle Red Bulls
- (South Africa) Ivan van Zyl to (South Africa) Sharks
- (England) Charlie Barker (released)
- (England) Matthew Branch-Holland (released)
- (England) Ryan Jones (released)
- (England) Sam Spink (released)
- (England) Lewis Young (released)
- (England) Louie Johnson to (England) Ealing Trailfinders
- (England) Gareth Simpson to (England) Ealing Trailfinders
- (England) Barney Merrett to (England) Ampthill
- (Samoa) Theo McFarland to (France) La Rochelle
- (Samoa) Totoa Auva'a to (England) Bristol Bears

== See also ==
- List of 2026–27 United Rugby Championship transfers
- List of 2026–27 Champ Rugby transfers
- List of 2026–27 Super Rugby transfers
- List of 2026–27 Top 14 transfers
- List of 2026–27 Rugby Pro D2 transfers
- List of 2026–27 Major League Rugby transfers
