= List of 2026–27 Rugby Pro D2 transfers =

This is a list of player transfers involving Rugby Pro D2 teams before or during the 2026–27 season. The list is of deals that are confirmed and are either from or to a rugby union team in the Pro D2 during the 2025–26 season. It is not unknown for confirmed deals to be cancelled at a later date.

== Agen ==
=== Players In ===
- (France) Hugo Bouyssou from (France) Nevers
- (France) Akato Fakatika from (France) Perpignan
- (France) Jules Soulan from (France) Provence
- (France) Charles Laloi from (France) Stade Français Paris
- (Argentina) Enrique Pieretto from (Italy) Zebre Parma
- (Serbia) Damien Bozic from (France) Suresnes
- (Argentina) Gael Galvan from (France) La Rochelle (season-long loan)
- (France) Nauil Audoire from (France) Suresnes

=== Players Out ===
- (France) Franck Pourteau to (France) COP XV
- (France) Loris Tolot to (France) COP XV
- (France) Emile Dayral to (France) Chambéry
- (Georgia (country)) Lasha Macharashvili to (France) Bayonne
- (Georgia (country)) Mamuka Mstoiani to (France) Colomiers
- (France) Alex Burin to (France) Castres
- (England) Beau Farrance to (France) Nissa
- (Georgia (country)) Omar Odishvili to (France) Beziers
- (Canada) Evan Olmstead to (France) Nissa
- (France) Théo Idjellidaine to (France) Nissa
- (France) Mathieu De Giovanni (retired)
- (France) Lomig Jouanny to (France) Montauban
- (England) Jack Maunder to (France) Montauban

== Aurillac ==
=== Players In ===
- (France) Matteo Coustalat from (France) Albi
- (South Africa) Stephan Le Roux from (France) Niort
- (France) Enzo Marzocco from (France) Chambéry
- (Belgium) Jean-Baptiste de Clercq from (France) Albi
- (Georgia (country)) Guram Ganiashvili from (Georgia (country)) Black Lion
- (Georgia (country)) Lasha Tabidze from (France) Chambéry
- (France) Thomas Carol from (France) Pau
- (France) Nathan Azais from (France) Bourg-en-Bressane
- (Australia) Ben Houston from (United States) California Legion
- (France) Ruben Courties from (France) Albi

=== Players Out ===
- (France) David Delarue to (France) Beziers
- (France) Thomas Delpeuch to (France) Bordeaux
- (Netherlands) Koen Bloemen to (France) Oyonnax
- (France) Lucas Oudard to (France) Brive
- (South Africa) AJ Coertzen (retired)
- (Georgia (country)) Dachi Papunashvili to (France) Montauban
- (France) Rémi Couty to (France) Pau
- (New Zealand) Dominic Robertson-McCoy to (France) Perigueux
- (Tonga) Mosa'ati Moala to (France) Vienne
- (South Africa) Jean-Luc Cilliers to (France) Grasse
- (South Africa) Jordon Janse van Rensburg to (France) Beziers
- (France) Leo Salvan to (France) Rouen
- (Tonga) Wesley Tapueluelu to (France) Mont-de-Marsan
- (France) Axel Bevin to (France) Narbonne
- (France) Aurelien Barreau to (France) Mont-de-Marsan

== Béziers ==
=== Players In ===
- (France) David Delarue from (France) Aurillac
- (South Africa) Jordon Janse van Rensburg from (France) Aurllac
- (Wales) Mackenzie Martin from (Wales) Dragons
- (France) Guillaume Galletier from (France) Provence
- (Tonga) Malakai Fekitoa from (Italy) Benetton
- (Democratic Republic of the Congo) Ian Kitwanga from (France) Soyaux Angoulême
- (France) Killian Taofifénua from (France) Carcassonne
- (England) Monty Loggenberg from (England) Leicester Tigers
- (England) Tubuna Maka from (England) Leicester Tigers
- (Georgia (country)) Luka Azariashvili from (France) Montauban
- (France) Paul Gadea from (France) Carcassonne
- (Georgia (country)) Luka Goginava from (France) Mont-de-Marsan
- (New Zealand) Maka Mafileo from (Australia) Manly
- (France) Job Poulet from (France) Perpignan (season-long loan)
- (Georgia (country)) Nikoloz Sutidze from (France) La Rochelle (season-long loan)
- (Georgia (country)) Omar Odishvili from (France) Agen

=== Players Out ===
- (Fiji) Petero Mailulu to (France) Stade Français Paris
- (Tonga) Otunuku Pauta to (France) Grenoble
- (France) Baptiste Abescat to (France) Grenoble
- (Fiji) Sireli Masiwini to (France) Provence
- (Portugal) Hugo Camacho to (France) Albi
- (Portugal) Samuel Marques to (France) Carcassonne
- (France) Theo Vassallo to (France) Carcassonne
- (France) Yannick Arroyo to (France) Oyonnax
- (Romania) Taylor Gontineac to (France) Castres
- (England) Christian Judge to (France) Brive
- (France) Marco Trauth to (France) Valence Romans
- (South Africa) John Henry Fincham to (France) Brive
- (Fiji) Aminiasi Tuimaba to (France) Mont-de-Marsan
- (France) Romain Uruty to (France) Albi
- (France) Clément Doumenc to (France) Carcassonne
- (South Africa) Wilmar Arnoldi (retired)
- (France) Pierre Gayraud to (France) Carcassonne

== Biarritz ==
=== Players In ===
- (New Zealand) Tom Hendrickson from (England) Worcester Warriors
- (Samoa) Duncan Paia'aua from (France) Perpignan
- (Tonga) Sione Vailanu from (Scotland) Glasgow Warriors
- (Scotland) Charlie Shiel from (Scotland) Edinburgh

=== Players Out ===
- (South Africa) Joe Jonas to (France) Vannes

== Brive ==
=== Players In ===
- (France) Lucas Oudard from (France) Aurillac
- (England) Christian Judge from (France) Beziers
- (France) Aymeric Luc from (France) Pau
- (South Africa) John Henry Fincham from (France) Beziers

=== Players Out ===
- (France) Luka Keletanoa to (France) Toulon
- (England) Courtney Lawes to (England) Sale Sharks
- (South Africa) Curwin Bosch to (South Africa) Bulls
- (South Africa) Hendré Stassen to (South Africa) Sharks
- (France) Benjamin Boudou to (France) Racing 92
- (France) Nathan Fraissenon to (France) La Rochelle

== Colomiers ==
=== Players In ===
- (Georgia (country)) Mamuka Mstoiani from (France) Agen
- (France) Thibault Debaes from (France) Vannes

=== Players Out ===
- (Portugal) Rodrigo Marta to (France) Pau
- (France) Thomas Adelaide to (France) La Rochelle
- (Tonga) Anzelo Tuitavuki to (Wales) Dragons
- (Portugal) Nicolas Martins to (France) Racing 92
- (New Zealand) Ray Nu'u to (France) Vannes

== Dax ==
=== Players In ===
- (England) Freddie Lockwood from (England) Newcastle Red Bulls
- (France) Thomas Carol from (France) Pau

=== Players Out ===
- (France) Diego Miranda to (France) Pau

== Grenoble ==
=== Players In ===
- (Tonga) Otunuku Pauta from (France) Beziers
- (France) Baptiste Abescat from (France) Beziers
- (France) Lucas Tauzin from (France) Clermont
- (Wales) James Fender from (Wales) Ospreys
- (Australia) Fergus Lee-Warner from (England) Newcastle Red Bulls

=== Players Out ===
- (Portugal) José Madeira to (France) Perpignan
- (France) Thomas Ployet to (France) Vannes
- (France) Hugo Avogadro to (France) Bordeaux

== Montauban ==
=== Players In ===
- (France) Romain Macurdy from (France) Castres
- (France) Lucas Dessaigne from (France) Clermont
- (Scotland) Johnny Matthews from (Scotland) Glasgow Warriors
- (France) Daniel Brennan from (France) Toulon
- (Australia) Jack Walsh from (Wales) Ospreys
- (Georgia (country)) Dachi Papunashvili from (France) Aurillac
- (France) Enzo Hervé from (France) Castres (season-long loan)
- (France) Lomig Jouanny from (France) Agen
- (England) Jack Maunder from (France) Agen

=== Players Out ===
- (France) Kyllian Ringuet to (France) Castres
- (France) Thomas Bué to (France) Stade Français Paris
- (Georgia (country)) Luka Azariashvili to (France) Beziers
- (New Zealand) Sione Mafileo to (France) Vannes
- (South Africa) Sikhumbuzo Notshe to (South Africa) Lions

== Narbonne ==
=== Players In ===
- (South Africa) Lubabalo Dobela from (South Africa) Lions
- (South Africa) Ruben Schoeman from (South Africa) Lions
- (France) Simon Huchet from (France) La Rochelle
- (Belgium) Charlesty Berguet from (France) Vannes
- (France) Victor Hannoun from (France) Bayonne
- (France) Axel Bevin from (France) Aurillac

=== Players Out ===
- (Samoa) Brad Amituanai to (France) Perpignan

== Nevers ==
=== Players In ===
- (South Africa) Arno Botha from (France) Lyon
- (France) Paul Jedrasiak from (France) Castres

=== Players Out ===
- (France) Hugo Bouyssou to (France) SU Agen
- (Georgia (country)) Lasha Pkhakadze to (France) Bordeaux
- (New Zealand) Chris Gabriel to (France) Castres
- (England) Zak Farrance to (England) Blackheath

== Nissa ==
=== Players In ===
- (France) Théo Idjellidaine from (France) Agen
- (England) Beau Farrance from (France) Agen
- (Canada) Evan Olmstead from (France) Agen
- (France) Vincent Rattez from (France) Lyon
- (France) Étienne Falgoux from (France) Clermont
- (New Zealand) Francis Saili from (France) Vannes
- (Samoa) Iakopo Mapu from (France) Stade Français Paris

== Oyonnax ==
=== Players In ===
- (France) Thomas Darmon from (France) Montpellier
- (Netherlands) Koen Bloemen from (France) Aurillac
- (France) Yannick Arroyo from (France) Beziers
- (Chile) Iñaki Ayarza from (France) Vannes
- (France) Thomas Vincent from (France) Montpellier
- (Australia) Feleti Kaitu'u from (France) Racing 92
- (Australia) Alex Newsome from (France) Clermont

=== Players Out ===
- (France) Justin Bouraux to (France) Clermont
- (Fiji) Peniami Narisia to (France) Clermont

== Provence ==
=== Players In ===
- (France) Aurélien Azar from (France) Castres
- (Fiji) Sireli Masiwini from (France) Beziers
- (Canada) Tyler Ardron from (France) Castres
- (France) Pascal Cotet from (France) Bayonne
- (France) Vincent Guidicelli from (France) Bayonne

=== Players Out ===
- (France) Jules Soulan to (France) Agen
- (Wales) Tomas Francis to (England) Sale Sharks
- (France) Guillaume Galletier to (France) Beziers

== Soyaux Angoulême ==
=== Players In ===
- (Georgia (country)) Gela Aprasidze from (France) Perpignan
- (Georgia (country)) Giorgi Javakhia from (France) Toulon

=== Players Out ===
- (Italy) François Carlo Mey to (Italy) Benetton
- (Democratic Republic of the Congo) Ian Kitwanga to (France) Beziers

== Valence Romans ==
=== Players In ===
- (France) Marco Tauleigne from (France) Montpellier
- (France) Marco Trauth from (France) Beziers

=== Players Out ===
- (England) Jack Hopson to (England) Worcester Warriors
- (New Zealand) Suetena Asomua to (England) Coventry

== See also ==
- List of 2026–27 Premiership Rugby transfers
- List of 2026–27 United Rugby Championship transfers
- List of 2026–27 Super Rugby transfers
- List of 2026–27 Top 14 transfers
- List of 2026–27 Champ Rugby transfers
- List of 2026–27 Major League Rugby transfers
