= List of 2026–27 United Rugby Championship transfers =

This is a list of player transfers involving United Rugby Championship teams before or during 2026–27 season.

== Benetton ==
=== Players in ===
- (Australia) Louis Werchon from (Australia) Queensland Reds
- (South Africa) Jean Smith from (South Africa) Sharks
- (Argentina) Gonzalo Hughes from (France) Périgueux
- (New Zealand) Isaia Walker-Leawere from (New Zealand) Hurricanes
- (Australia) Josh Flook from (Australia) Queensland Reds
- (Argentina) Matias Medrano from (Argentina) Pampas XV
- (Italy) François Carlo Mey from (France) Soyaux Angoulême
- (Italy) Lorenzo Pani from (Italy) Zebre Parma

=== Players out ===
- (Italy) Tommaso Menoncello to (France) Toulouse
- (Zimbabwe) Eli Snyman to (Ireland) Ulster
- (Argentina) Thomas Gallo to (France) Lyon
- (Australia) Scott Scrafton (retired)
- (Argentina) Nahuel Tetaz Chaparro (retired)
- (Argentina) Nicolás Roger to (Argentina) Dogos XV
- (Fiji) Simon Koroiyadi to (England) Nottingham
- (Tonga) Malakai Fekitoa to (France) Beziers
- (Samoa) So'otala Fa'aso'o (released)

== Bulls ==
=== Players in ===
- (South Africa) Thaakir Abrahams from (Ireland) Munster
- (South Africa) Curwin Bosch from (France) Brive
- (South Africa) Jean Erasmus (promoted from Academy)
- (South Africa) Hakeem Kunene from (South Africa) Sharks
- (South Africa) Hanro Liebenberg from (England) Leicester Tigers
- (South Africa) Dylan Maart from (South Africa) Stormers
- (South Africa) Mawande Mdanda from (South Africa) Sharks
- (South Africa) Heinrich Theron (promoted from Academy)
- (South Africa) JJ Theron (promoted from Academy)
- (South Africa) Sango Xamlashe from (South Africa) Pumas
- (South Africa) Janco Uys from (South Africa) Griquas (season-long loan)
- (South Africa) Kwagga Smith from (Japan) Shizuoka Blue Revs

=== Players out ===
- (South Africa) Kurt-Lee Arendse to (Japan) Mitsubishi Sagamihara DynaBoars
- (South Africa) Wilco Louw to (South Africa) Stormers
- (South Africa) Esethu Mnebelele to (South Africa) Sharks
- (South Africa) David Kriel to (France) La Rochelle
- (South Africa) Jan Serfontein (retired)
- (South Africa) Jannes Kirsten to (France) Mont-de-Marsan
- (South Africa) Henry Immelman to (South Africa) Cheetahs
- (South Africa) Ruan Nortjé to (Japan) Kubota Spears
- (South Africa) Steven Nel (released)
- (South Africa) Ruan Swart to (South Africa) Lions (Currie Cup)
- (South Africa) Kade Wolhuter (released)

== Cardiff ==
=== Players in ===
- (Namibia) Le Roux Malan from (South Africa) Sharks
- (Samoa) Scott Sio from (England) Exeter Chiefs
- (Tonga) Semisi Paea from (New Zealand) Moana Pasifika
- (Wales) Jarrod Evans from (England) Harlequins
- (England) Tom Manz from (England) Leicester Tigers (season-long loan)
- (Wales) Ioan Emanuel from (England) Bath (season-long loan)
- (Wales) Jonny Green from (England) Harlequins

=== Players out ===
- (England) Ben Donnell to (Ireland) Ulster
- (Wales) Corey Domachowski to (Wales) Scarlets
- (Wales) Leigh Halfpenny (retired)
- (Wales) Dylan Barratt (released)
- (Ireland) Ed Byrne (released)
- (Wales) Ollie Das (released)
- (Wales) Joseff Jones (released)
- (Wales) Harrison Rock (released)
- (Wales) Mackenzie Martin to (France) Beziers
- (Wales) Will Davies-King to (England) Bedford Blues
- (England) Rory Jennings to (England) Rosslyn Park
- (Wales) George Nott (retired)

== Connacht ==
=== Players in ===
- (Ireland) Ciarán Frawley from (Ireland) Leinster
- (Ireland) Will Connors from (Ireland) Leinster
- (South Africa) Francois van Wyk from (England) Bath
- (Ireland) Fiachna Barrett (promoted from Academy)
- (Ireland) Sean Naughton (promoted from Academy)
- (Ireland) Matthew Victory (promoted from Academy)
- (Ireland) Jerry Cahir from (Ireland) Leinster
- (Ireland) Thomas Connolly from (Ireland) Belvedere
- (Ireland) Billy Bohan (promoted from Academy)

=== Players out ===
- (Ireland) Joe Joyce to (England) Gloucester
- (Ireland) Matthew Devine to (Ireland) Ulster
- (Ireland) Jack Carty (retired)
- (Ireland) Denis Buckley (retired)
- (Ireland) Oisin Dowling (retired)
- (Ireland) Temi Lasisi (released)
- (Ireland) Oisín McCormack (released)
- (Ireland) David Hawkshaw (released)
- (Ireland) Jack Aungier to (Ireland) Munster
- (Ireland) Chay Mullins to (Ireland) Ulster
- (Ireland) Peter Dooley to (Ireland) Leinster

== Dragons ==
=== Players in ===
- (Tonga) Anzelo Tuitavuki from (France) Colomiers
- (New Zealand) Terrell Peita from (New Zealand) Blues
- (Wales) Caio Parry from (Wales) RGC 1404
- (Samoa) Ere Enari from (New Zealand) Hurricanes

=== Players out ===
- (Wales) Aaron Wainwright to (England) Leicester Tigers
- (Wales) Ewan Rosser to (Wales) Pontypool
- (Ireland) Niall Armstrong (released)
- (Wales) James Benjamin (retired)
- (Wales) Luke Yendle (released)
- (Wales) George Roberts to (Wales) Scarlets

== Edinburgh ==
=== Players in ===
- (New Zealand) Riley Higgins from (New Zealand) Hurricanes
- (Scotland) Hector Patterson (promoted from Academy)
- (Scotland) Geordie Gwynn from (England) Ealing Trailfinders
- (New Zealand) Louie Chapman from (New Zealand) Crusaders
- (Scotland) Jack Brown (promoted from Academy)
- (Scotland) Jerry Blyth-Lafferty (promoted from Academy)
- (Scotland) Alec Hepburn from (Wales) Scarlets
- (England) James Grayson from (Japan) Mitsubishi Sagamihara DynaBoars
- (Scotland) Ollie Duncan (promoted from Academy)
- (Scotland) Euan McVie (promoted from Academy)
- (New Zealand) Kienan Higgins from (United States) New England Free Jacks

=== Players out ===
- (South Africa) Boan Venter to (South Africa) Lions
- (Scotland) Mikey Jones (released)
- (Scotland) Ross McCann (released)
- (Scotland) Sam Skinner (released)
- (Scotland) Ben Healy to (France) La Rochelle
- (Scotland) Hamish Watson to (France) Castres
- (New Zealand) Angus Williams to (England) Doncaster Knights
- (Scotland) James Lang to (England) Harlequins
- (Scotland) Charlie Shiel to (France) Biarritz

== Glasgow Warriors ==
=== Players in ===
- (Scotland) Jack Oliver (promoted from Academy)
- (Scotland) Macenzzie Duncan (promoted from Academy)
- (Scotland) Matthew Urwin (promoted from Academy)
- (Scotland) Johnny Ventisei (promoted from Academy)
- (South Africa) Ruwald van der Merwe from (South Africa) Pumas
- (Scotland) Fergus Watson (promoted from Academy)
- (Scotland) Seb Stephen (promoted from Academy)
- (Scotland) Kerr Yule (promoted from Academy)
- (Australia) Bayley Kuenzle from (Australia) Western Force
- (Scotland) Kerr Johnston (promoted from Academy)
- (Scotland) Jamie Ritchie from (France) Perpignan
- (Scotland) Ryan Burke (promoted from Academy)
- (Scotland) Guy Rogers from (England) Harlequins
- (Scotland) Ruaraidh Hart (promoted from Academy)
- (England) Jack Singleton from (England) Gloucester

=== Players out ===
- (Scotland) Adam Hastings to (France) Montpellier
- (Scotland) Huw Jones to (France) Toulon
- (Scotland) Jamie Bhatti to (England) Bath
- (Scotland) Jack Dempsey to (Japan) Toshiba Brave Lupus
- (Scotland) Johnny Matthews to (France) Montauban
- (Scotland) Duncan Weir (retired)
- (Tonga) Sione Vailanu to (France) Biarritz
- (South Africa) Brent Jackson to (England) Rotherham Titans

== Leinster ==
=== Players in ===
- (Ireland) Stephen Smyth (promoted from Academy)
- (Ireland) Conor O'Tighearnaigh (promoted from Academy)
- (Ireland) Josh Kenny (promoted from Academy)
- (Ireland) Joey Carbery from (France) Bordeaux
- (Ireland) Peter Dooley from (Ireland) Connacht

=== Players out ===
- (New Zealand) Rieko Ioane to (New Zealand) Blues
- (Ireland) Ciarán Frawley to (Ireland) Connacht
- (Ireland) Will Connors to (Ireland) Connacht
- (Ireland) Luke McGrath to (France) Perpignan
- (France) Rabah Slimani to (France) Toulon
- (Ireland) Jerry Cahir to (Ireland) Connacht
- (Ireland) John McKee to (Wales) Scarlets
- (Ireland) James Lowe to (Japan) Tokyo Sungoliath

== Lions ==
=== Players in ===
- (South Africa) Boan Venter from (Scotland) Edinburgh
- (South Africa) Hyron Andrews from (England) Sale Sharks
- (South Africa) Boeta Chamberlain from (England) Newcastle Red Bulls
- (Democratic Republic of the Congo) Daniel Kasende from (Wales) Ospreys
- (South Africa) Asad Moos from (South Africa) Stormers
- (South Africa) Sikhumbuzo Notshe from (France) Montauban
- (South Africa) JP du Preez from (Japan) Red Hurricanes Osaka
- (South Africa) Eddie Davids from (South Africa) Griquas
- (South Africa) Tiaan Lange from (South Africa) Griquas (season-long loan)

=== Players out ===
- (South Africa) Gianni Lombard to (South Africa) Sharks
- (South Africa) Asenathi Ntlabakanye (suspended)
- (South Africa) Corné Weilbach to (England) Saracens
- (South Africa) Franco Marais (retired)
- (South Africa) Lubabalo Dobela to (France) Narbonne
- (South Africa) Ruben Schoeman to (France) Narbonne
- (South Africa) Johnré Stopforth to (South Africa) Boland Cavaliers
- (Zimbabwe) Darrien Landsberg to (South Africa) Sharks
- (Zimbabwe) Tapiwa Mafura (released)
- (South Africa) Heiko Pohlmann to (South Africa) Boland Cavaliers
- (South Africa) WJ Steenkamp (released)
- (South Africa) Haashim Pead to (South Africa) Stormers
- (South Africa) Stian de Bruyn (released)
- (South Africa) Izan Esterhuizen (released)
- (South Africa) JT Kapank returned to (South Africa) UJ Rugby
- (South Africa) Eduan Keyter (released)
- (South Africa) Mannie Rass (released)

== Munster ==
=== Players in ===
- (South Africa) Marnus van der Merwe from (Wales) Scarlets
- (Ireland) Sean Edogbo (promoted from Academy)
- (Ireland) Ben O'Connor (promoted from Academy)
- (Ireland) Ronan Foxe (promoted from Academy)
- (Ireland) Jack Aungier from (Ireland) Connacht
- (Ireland) Max Clein (promoted from Academy)
- (Australia) Will Harrison from (Japan) Hanazono Kintetsu Liners
- (Ireland) Ben O'Donovan (promoted from Academy)
- (England) Kieran Brookes from (France) Perpignan
- (Ireland) Rob Russell from (Ireland) Old Belvedere R.F.C. (short term injury cover)

=== Players out ===
- (South Africa) Jean Kleyn to (England) Gloucester
- (Ireland) Niall Scannell (retired)
- (Ireland) John Ryan (retired)
- (South Africa) Thaakir Abrahams to (South Africa) Bulls
- (Ireland) Tony Butler (released)
- (Ireland) Paddy Patterson (released)
- (Ireland) Andrew Smith to (Australia) Eastern Suburbs
- (Ireland) Oli Jager (retired)
- (Ireland) Fionn Gibbons to (England) Ealing Trailfinders
- (Ireland) Conor Bartley (released)
- (Ireland) Roman Salanoa to (Ireland) Nenagh Ormond

== Ospreys ==
=== Players in ===
- (Wales) Tom Rogers from (Wales) Scarlets
- (Wales) Dan John from (England) Exeter Chiefs
- (Australia) Liam Wright (unattached)
- (Australia) Lalakai Foketi from (New Zealand) Chiefs
- (Australia) Lawson Creighton from (Australia) NSW Waratahs
- (Australia) Marika Koroibete from (Japan) Saitama Wild Knights
- (Wales) Steff Jac Jones from (Wales) Scarlets
- (Wales) Louie Trevett from (England) Bristol Bears (short-term loan)

=== Players out ===
- (Wales) Jac Morgan to (England) Gloucester
- (Wales) Dewi Lake to (England) Gloucester
- (Wales) James Fender to (France) Grenoble
- (England) Phil Cokanasiga to (England) Gloucester
- (Australia) Jack Walsh to (France) Montauban
- (Wales) Connor Moyse to (England) London Scottish
- (New Zealand) Ieuan Cornelius to (Wales) RGC 1404
- (England) Max Nagy to (England) Ealing Trailfinders
- (Wales) Tom Florence to (England) Ealing Trailfinders
- (Wales) Luke Scully to (Wales) Swansea
- (Democratic Republic of the Congo) Daniel Kasende to (South Africa) Lions
- (Wales) Ryan Conbeer to (Wales) Bridgend Ravens
- (England) Will Greatbanks (retired)

== Scarlets ==
=== Players in ===
- (Wales) Corey Domachowski from (Wales) Cardiff
- (England) Harvey Cuckson from (England) Bath
- (Wales) Jac Davies (promoted from Academy)
- (Ireland) John McKee from (Ireland) Leinster
- (Wales) George Roberts from (Wales) Dragons
- (South Africa) Alex Groves from (South Africa) Stormers
- (New Zealand) Isaac Murray-MacGregor from (New Zealand) Canterbury
- (Wales) Will Evans (promoted from Academy)
- (New Zealand) Cullen Grace from (New Zealand) Crusaders
- (England) Gabe Hawley (promoted from Academy)
- (Wales) Carwyn Leggatt-Jones (promoted from Academy)
- (England) Ioan Jones (promoted from Academy)
- (Wales) Josh Morse (promoted from Academy)
- (Wales) Isaac Young (promoted from Academy)
- (New Zealand) Tom Allen from (New Zealand) Hurricanes
- (Wales) Gareth Anscombe from (France) Bayonne

=== Players out ===
- (South Africa) Marnus van der Merwe to (Ireland) Munster
- (Wales) Tom Rogers to (Wales) Ospreys
- (Scotland) Alec Hepburn to (Scotland) Edinburgh
- (Wales) Jake Ball (retired)
- (Wales) Dan Gemine (released)
- (Wales) Rhodri Lewis (released)
- (Wales) Tom Phillips (released)
- (Wales) Ben Williams to (Wales) Pontypool
- (Australia) Max Douglas to (Japan) Shizuoka Blue Revs
- (South Africa) Jarrod Taylor to (England) Ealing Trailfinders
- (Wales) Steff Jac Jones to (Wales) Ospreys

== Sharks ==
=== Players in ===
- (South Africa) Thomas du Toit from (England) Bath
- (South Africa) Stephan Lewies from (England) Harlequins
- (South Africa) Nemo Roelofse from (France) Perpignan
- (South Africa) Gianni Lombard from (South Africa) Lions
- (South Africa) Ivan van Zyl from (England) Saracens
- Donavan Don from South Africa Sevens
- (South Africa) Murray Koster from (Japan) Hino Red Dolphins
- (South Africa) Esethu Mnebelele from (South Africa) Bulls
- (South Africa) Hendré Stassen from (France) Brive
- (Zimbabwe) Darrien Landsberg from (South Africa) Lions
- (New Zealand) Ma'a Nonu from (France) Toulon
- (South Africa) Suleiman Hartzenberg from (South Africa) Stormers

=== Players out ===
- (South Africa) Siya Kolisi to (South Africa) Stormers
- (Italy) Jean Smith to (Italy) Benetton
- (Namibia) Le Roux Malan to (Wales) Cardiff
- (South Africa) Hakeem Kunene to (South Africa) Bulls
- (South Africa) Mawande Mdanda to (South Africa) Bulls
- (South Africa) Marvin Orie (released)
- (South Africa) Grant Williams to (Japan) Kobelco Kobe Steelers
- (South Africa) Aphelele Fassi to (Japan) Toshiba Brave Lupus
- (South Africa) Francois Venter (retired)
- (South Africa) Diego Appollis (released)
- (South Africa) Ruan Dreyer (released)
- (South Africa) Bongi Mbonambi to (South Africa) Stormers
- Marnus Potgieter to South Africa Sevens

== Stormers ==
=== Players in ===
- (South Africa) Wilco Louw from (South Africa) Bulls
- (South Africa) Siya Kolisi from (South Africa) Sharks
- (South Africa) Cheslin Kolbe from (Japan) Tokyo Sungoliath
- (South Africa) Haashim Pead from (South Africa) Lions
- (South Africa) André Warner from (United States) Seattle Seawolves (six-month loan)
- (South Africa) Bongi Mbonambi from (South Africa) Sharks

=== Players out ===
- (South Africa) Ruben van Heerden to (France) Montpellier
- (South Africa) Salmaan Moerat to (France) La Rochelle
- (South Africa) Scarra Ntubeni (retired)
- (South Africa) Dylan Maart to (South Africa) Bulls
- (South Africa) Alex Groves to (Wales) Scarlets
- (South Africa) Dan du Plessis to (France) Bordeaux
- (South Africa) Asad Moos to (South Africa) Lions
- (South Africa) Suleiman Hartzenberg to (South Africa) Sharks
- (South Africa) Jared Africa (released)
- (South Africa) Dewaldt Duvenage (retired)
- (South Africa) Frans Malherbe (released)
- (South Africa) Courtnall Skosan (retired)
- (South Africa) Ali Vermaak to (South Africa) Boland Cavaliers

== Ulster ==
=== Players in ===
- (Zimbabwe) Eli Snyman from (Italy) Benetton
- (Ireland) Matthew Devine from (Ireland) Connacht
- (England) Ben Donnell from (Wales) Cardiff
- (Ireland) Bryn Ward (promoted from Academy)
- (England) Jamie Benson from (England) Harlequins
- (Argentina) Eduardo Bello from (England) Newcastle Red Bulls
- (South Africa) Keynan Knox from (France) Nevers
- (Ireland) Chay Mullins from (Ireland) Connacht
- (Ireland) Henry Walker (promoted from Academy)
- (Ireland) Aitzol Arenzana-King (promoted from Academy)
- (Ireland) Daniel Hawkshaw from (Ireland) Clontarf
- (Ireland) Martin Moloney from (England) Exeter Chiefs

=== Players out ===
- (Australia) Angus Bell to (Australia) NSW Waratahs
- (Ireland) John Andrew (released)
- (Ireland) Ben Moxham (released)
- (Ireland) Rory McGuire (released)
- (Ireland) Bryan O'Connor (released)
- (Ireland) Marcus Rea (released)
- (England) Sean Reffell (released)
- (Ireland) David Shanahan (released)
- (South Africa) Werner Kok to (England) Newcastle Red Bulls
- (Ireland) James Humphreys to (England) Ealing Trailfinders
- (Ireland) Matthew Dalton to (Japan) Kobelco Kobe Steelers
- (Ireland) Lorcan McLoughlin to (Japan) Yakult Levins Toda

== Zebre Parma ==
=== Players in ===
- (Italy) Alex Mattioli from (France) Racing 92
- (Italy) Pietro Turrisi from (France) Racing 92
- (Italy) Jacopo Botturi from (Italy) Petrarca Padova
- (Argentina) Francisco Minervino from (Italy) Petrarca Padova
- (Italy) Sergio Pelliccioli from (Italy) Petrarca Padova
- (Italy) Lorenzo Citton from (Italy) Petrarca Padova
- (Italy) Tommaso Allan from (France) Perpignan
- (Argentina) Patricio Baronio from (Italy) Viadana
- (Italy) Leonardo Sodo Migliori from (Italy) Fiamme Oro
- (South Africa) Zane Bester from (South Africa) Griquas (season-long loan)
- (Argentina) Tobías Wade from (Argentina) Alumni

=== Players out ===
- (Argentina) Enrique Pieretto to (France) Agen
- (Italy) Enrico Lucchin (retired)
- (Italy) Luca Morisi (retired)
- (Italy) Albert Batista to (Italy) Rugby Viadana
- (United States) Shilo Klein (released)
- (Argentina) Martin Roger Farias (released)
- (Argentina) Gonzalo Garcia to (France) Pau
- (Italy) Malik Faissal to (England) Northampton Saints
- (Romania) Iacopo Bianchi to (Italy) Rovigo Delta
- (Argentina) Guido Volpi to (Italy) Viadana
- (Italy) Ion Neculai to (England) Northampton Saints
- (Italy) Matteo Nocera to (France) Lyon
- (Italy) Lorenzo Pani to (Italy) Benetton

== See also ==
- List of 2026–27 Premiership Rugby transfers
- List of 2026–27 Champ Rugby transfers
- List of 2026–27 Super Rugby transfers
- List of 2026–27 Top 14 transfers
- List of 2026–27 Rugby Pro D2 transfers
- List of 2026–27 Major League Rugby transfers
