= List of 2026–27 Top 14 transfers =

This is a list of player transfers involving Top 14 teams before or during the 2026–27 season. The list is of deals that are confirmed and are either from or to a rugby union team in the Top 14 during the 2025–26 season. It is not unknown for confirmed deals to be cancelled at a later date.

On 6 June 2026, Vannes defeated Provence to win the 2025–26 Rugby Pro D2 season, thus promoted to the Top 14 for the 2026-27 season. Montauban are relegated to the Pro D2 for the 2026-27 season.

== Bayonne ==
=== Players In ===
- (South Africa) Rob du Preez from (England) Sale Sharks
- (France) Kilian Geraci from (France) Lyon
- (Samoa) Brian Alainu'uese from (France) Toulon
- (France) Guillaume Cramont from (France) Toulouse (season-long loan)
- (Democratic Republic of the Congo) Madosh Tambwe from (France) Bordeaux
- (France) Matthieu Uhila from (France) Montpellier (season-long loan)
- (Fiji) Viliame Tutuvuli from (France) Carcassonne
- (Georgia (country)) Lasha Macharashvili from (France) Agen
- (France) Léo Coly from (France) Montpellier
- (France) Raphaël Darquier from (France) Mont-de-Marsan

=== Players Out ===
- (France) Baptiste Germain to (France) Clermont
- (England) Alexander Moon to (France) Bordeaux
- (France) Maxime Machenaud to (France) Montpellier
- (France) Baptiste Chouzenoux (retired)
- (France) Victor Hannoun to (France) Narbonne
- (France) Pascal Cotet to (France) Provence
- (Wales) Gareth Anscombe to (Wales) Scarlets
- (Spain) Manex Ariceta to (France) Chambery
- (Australia) Aiden Stait to (Australia) ACT Brumbies
- (France) Vincent Guidicelli to (France) Provence
- (Australia) Rob Leota to (France) Clermont

== Bordeaux ==
=== Players In ===
- (England) Tom Willis from (England) Saracens
- (England) Alexander Moon from (France) Bayonne
- (France) Thomas Delpeuch from (France) Aurillac
- (Georgia (country)) Lasha Pkhakadze from (France) Nevers
- (South Africa) Dan du Plessis from (South Africa) Stormers
- (France) Hugo Avogadro from (France) Grenoble

=== Players Out ===
- (France) Bastien Vergnes-Taillefer to (France) Pau
- (Australia) Lachlan Swinton to (France) Perpignan
- (Democratic Republic of the Congo) Madosh Tambwe to (France) Bayonne
- (France) Ugo Boniface to (France) Vannes
- (Ireland) Joey Carbery to (Ireland) Leinster

== Castres ==
=== Players In ===
- (France) Alex Burin from (France) Agen
- (New Zealand) Chris Gabriel from (France) Nevers
- (Romania) Taylor Gontineac from (France) Beziers
- (France) Kyllian Ringuet from (France) Montauban
- (New Zealand) Dalton Papali'i from (New Zealand) Blues
- (France) Maël Turpin from (France) Mont-de-Marsan
- (Scotland) Hamish Watson from (Scotland) Edinburgh
- (France) Théo Vidal from (France) Albi
- (France) Achille Stoessel from (France) Massy

=== Players Out ===
- (France) Aurélien Azar to (France) Provence
- (France) Romain Macurdy to (France) Montauban
- (France) Pierre Popelin to (France) Vannes
- (France) Antoine Tichit (retired)
- (Canada) Tyler Ardron to (France) Provence
- (France) Enzo Hervé to (France) Montauban (season-long loan)
- (France) Nathanaël Hulleu to (France) Vannes
- (Fiji) Leone Nakarawa to (Fiji) Fijian Drua
- (France) Paul Jedrasiak to (France) Nevers

== Clermont ==
=== Players In ===
- (France) Baptiste Germain from (France) Bayonne
- (France) Justin Bouraux from (France) Oyonnax
- (Australia) Darcy Swain from (Australia) Western Force
- (New Zealand) AJ Lam from (New Zealand) Blues
- (New Zealand) Etene Nanai-Seturo from (New Zealand) Chiefs
- (Fiji) Peniami Narisia from (France) Oyonnax
- (Australia) Rob Leota from (France) Bayonne

=== Players Out ===
- (France) Sébastien Bézy to (France) Montpellier
- (France) Lucas Dessaigne to (France) Montauban
- (France) Lucas Tauzin to (France) Grenoble
- (Australia) Alex Newsome to (France) Oyonnax
- (Tonga) George Moala to (France) La Rochelle
- (Australia) Irae Simone to (Japan) Green Rockets Tokatsu
- (France) Étienne Falgoux to (France) Nissa

== La Rochelle ==
=== Players In ===
- (France) Thomas Adelaide from (France) Colomiers
- (South Africa) Salmaan Moerat from (South Africa) Stormers
- (Scotland) Ben Healy from (Scotland) Edinburgh
- (South Africa) David Kriel from (South Africa) Bulls
- (France) Christophe Loustalot from (France) Mont-de-Marsan
- (Tonga) George Moala from (France) Clermont
- (Samoa) Theo McFarland from (England) Saracens
- (New Zealand) Sam Tuifua from (France) Mont-de-Marsan
- (New Zealand) Sione Ahio from (New Zealand) Chiefs
- (France) Nathan Fraissenon from (France) Brive
- (New Zealand) Tevita Ofa from (New Zealand) Counties Manukau

=== Players Out ===
- (France) Judicaël Cancoriet to (France) Toulon
- (Argentina) Joel Sclavi to (England) Leicester Tigers
- (France) Simon Huchet to (France) Narbonne
- (New Zealand) Ihaia West to (France) Stade Français Paris
- (France) Adrien Séguret to (France) Lyon
- (Argentina) Gael Galvan to (France) Agen (season-long loan)
- (France) Reda Wardi to (France) Montpellier
- (Georgia (country)) Nika Sutidze to (France) Beziers (season-long loan)

== Lyon ==
=== Players In ===
- (Argentina) Thomas Gallo from (Italy) Benetton
- (Fiji) Tim Hoyt from (England) Worcester Warriors
- (Japan) Opeti Helu from (Japan) Kubota Spears
- (France) Adrien Séguret from (France) La Rochelle
- (South Africa) Sanele Nohamba from (Japan) Shizuoka Blue Revs
- (Italy) Matteo Nocera from (Italy) Zebre Parma

=== Players Out ===
- (South Africa) Arno Botha to (France) Nevers
- (France) Kilian Geraci to (France) Bayonne
- (France) Cedate Gomes Sa to (France) Perpignan
- (France) Vincent Rattez to (France) Nissa
- (New Zealand) Jermaine Ainsley to (New Zealand) Highlanders

== Montpellier ==
=== Players In ===
- (France) Sébastien Bézy from (France) Clermont
- (Scotland) Adam Hastings from (Scotland) Glasgow Warriors
- (South Africa) Ruben van Heerden from (South Africa) Stormers
- (France) Dimitri Delibes from (France) Toulouse
- (France) Reda Wardi from (France) La Rochelle

=== Players Out ===
- (France) Enzo Forletta to (France) Perpignan
- (France) Marco Tauleigne to (France) Valence Romans
- (Georgia (country)) Nika Abuladze to (England) Exeter Chiefs
- (France) Matthieu Uhila to (France) Bayonne (season-long loan)
- (France) Thomas Darmon to (France) Oyonnax
- (France) Thomas Vincent to (France) Oyonnax
- (France) Léo Coly to (France) Bayonne
- (France) Mahamadou Diaby (retired)

== Pau ==
=== Players In ===
- (Portugal) Rodrigo Marta from (France) Colomiers
- (France) Baptiste Pesenti from (France) Stade Français Paris
- (France) Bastien Vergnes-Taillefer from (France) Bordeaux
- (France) Rémi Couty from (France) Aurillac
- (Argentina) Gonzalo Garcia from (Italy) Zebre Parma
- (France) Joachim Senga Kouo from (France) Vannes
- (Argentina) Santiago Grondona from (England) Bristol Bears
- (France) Diego Miranda from (France) Dax

=== Players Out ===
- (England) Dan Robson to (England) Gloucester
- (New Zealand) Luke Whitelock (retired)
- (Australia) Toshi Butlin to (Japan) Saitama Wild Knights
- (France) Thomas Carol to (France) Aurillac
- (France) Aymeric Luc to (France) Brive
- (Wales) Carwyn Tuipulotu to (England) Exeter Chiefs

== Perpignan ==
=== Players In ===
- (New Zealand) Sevu Reece from (New Zealand) Crusaders
- (France) Enzo Forletta from (France) Montpellier
- (France) Maëlan Rabut from (France) Oyonnax
- (Italy) Marco Riccioni from (England) Saracens
- (Ireland) Luke McGrath from (Ireland) Leinster
- (Portugal) José Madeira from (France) Grenoble
- (France) Cedate Gomes Sa from (France) Lyon
- (Australia) Lachlan Swinton from (France) Bordeaux
- (New Zealand) Braydon Ennor from (New Zealand) Crusaders
- (Samoa) Brad Amituanai from (France) Narbonne
- (Italy) Paolo Garbisi from (France) Toulon
- (France) Jules Coulon from (France) Toulon

=== Players Out ===
- (Fiji) Alivereti Duguivalu to (France) Stade Français Paris
- (France) Akato Fakatika to (France) Agen
- (South Africa) Nemo Roelofse to (South Africa) Sharks
- (New Zealand) Max Hicks to (England) Newcastle Red Bulls
- (Australia) Jordan Petaia to (Japan) Urayasu D-Rocks
- (Italy) Tommaso Allan to (Italy) Zebre Parma
- (Scotland) Jamie Ritchie to (Scotland) Glasgow Warriors
- (Samoa) Duncan Paia'aua to (France) Biarritz
- (Georgia (country)) Gela Aprasidze to (France) Soyaux Angoulême
- (France) Tavite Veredamu to (France) Nimes
- (France) Giorgi Beria to (France) Vannes
- (England) Kieran Brookes to (Ireland) Munster

== Racing 92 ==
=== Players In ===
- (France) Maxime Machenaud from (France) Bayonne
- (Portugal) Nicolas Martins from (France) Colomiers
- (France) Paul Costes from (France) Toulouse
- (France) Benjamin Boudou from (France) Brive
- (Australia) Seru Uru from (Australia) Queensland Reds

=== Players Out ===
- (Italy) Alex Mattioli to (Italy) Zebre Parma
- (Italy) Pietro Turrisi to (Italy) Zebre Parma
- (France) Gaël Fickou to (France) Toulon
- (Australia) Feleti Kaitu'u to (France) Oyonnax
- (France) Paul Rocher to (France) Chambery

== Stade Français ==
=== Players In ===
- (Fiji) Alivereti Duguivalu from (France) Perpignan
- (Australia) Tomasi Maka from (New Zealand) Tasman
- (Fiji) Petero Mailulu from (France) Beziers
- (New Zealand) Ihaia West from (France) La Rochelle
- (France) Thomas Bué from (France) Montauban
- (United States) Rufus McLean from (United States) Seattle Seawolves
- (Samoa) Israel Leota from (New Zealand) Moana Pasifika
- (France) Fabrice Metz from (France) Vannes

=== Players Out ===
- (France) Baptiste Pesenti to (France) Pau
- (England) Joe Marchant to (England) Sale Sharks
- (England) Zack Henry to (England) Newcastle Red Bulls
- (France) Charles Laloi to (France) Agen
- (Samoa) Iakopo Mapu to (France) Nissa

== Toulon ==
=== Players In ===
- (France) Judicaël Cancoriet from (France) La Rochelle
- (Scotland) Huw Jones from (Scotland) Glasgow Warriors
- (France) Luka Keletanoa from (France) Brive
- (France) Rabah Slimani from (Ireland) Leinster
- (France) Gaël Fickou from (France) Racing 92
- Apete Narogo from Fiji Sevens
- (Argentina) Luciano Asevedo from (Argentina) Tarucas

=== Players Out ===
- (Samoa) Brian Alainu'uese to (France) Bayonne
- (France) Daniel Brennan to (France) Montauban
- (Georgia (country)) Giorgi Javakhia to (France) Soyaux Angoulême
- (New Zealand) Ma'a Nonu to (South Africa) Sharks
- (Italy) Paolo Garbisi to (France) Perpignan
- (France) Clovis Le Bail to (France) Vannes
- (France) Jules Coulon to (France) Perpignan

== Toulouse ==
=== Players In ===
- (Italy) Tommaso Menoncello from (Italy) Benetton

=== Players Out ===
- (France) Guillaume Cramont to (France) Bayonne (season-long loan)
- (France) Dimitri Delibes to (France) Montpellier
- (France) Paul Costes to (France) Racing 92
- (Japan) Naoto Saitō to (Japan) Tokyo Sungoliath

== Vannes ==
=== Players In ===
- (France) Pierre Popelin from (France) Castres
- (Argentina) Matías Alemanno from (England) Gloucester
- (France) Ugo Boniface from (France) Bordeaux
- (Samoa) Mills Sanerivi from (New Zealand) Moana Pasifika
- (France) Nathanaël Hulleu from (France) Castres
- (France) Thomas Ployet from (France) Grenoble
- (Georgia (country)) Ioane Iashagashvili from (France) Mont-de-Marsan
- (New Zealand) Ray Nu'u from (France) Colomiers
- (France) Giorgi Beria from (France) Perpignan
- (New Zealand) Sione Mafileo from (France) Montauban
- (South Africa) Joe Jonas from (France) Biarritz
- (Fiji) Simione Kuruvoli from (Fiji) Fijian Drua
- (Fiji) Inia Tabuavou from (Fiji) Fijian Drua
- (Australia) Murray Taulagi from (Australia) North Queensland Cowboys
- (France) Clovis Le Bail from (France) Toulon
- (Samoa) Jeffery Toomaga-Allen from (Australia) Queensland Reds

=== Players Out ===
- (France) Joachim Senga Kouo to (France) Pau
- (England) Mako Vunipola to (England) Leicester Tigers
- (Chile) Iñaki Ayarza to (France) Oyonnax
- (France) Jules Le Bail (retired)
- (France) Cyril Blanchard (retired)
- (France) Gwenael Duplenne (retired)
- (France) Thomas Duchêne to (France) Issoire
- (Belgium) Charlesty Berguet to (France) Narbonne
- (France) Thibault Debaes to (France) Colomiers
- (France) Paga Tafili (retired)
- (New Zealand) Richard Judd to (New Zealand) Bay of Plenty
- (New Zealand) James O'Reilly to (New Zealand) Wellington
- (New Zealand) Francis Saili to (France) Nissa
- (France) Fabrice Metz to (France) Stade Français Paris

== See also ==
- List of 2026–27 Premiership Rugby transfers
- List of 2026–27 United Rugby Championship transfers
- List of 2026–27 Super Rugby transfers
- List of 2026–27 Champ Rugby transfers
- List of 2026–27 Rugby Pro D2 transfers
- List of 2026–27 Major League Rugby transfers
