= Asher Opoku-Fordjour =

English rugby union player (born 2004)

- Born: 16 July 2004 (age 22) Coventry, England
- Height: 1.84 m (6 ft 0 in)
- Weight: 115 kg (254 lb; 18 st 2 lb)
- School: City of Oxford College

Rugby union career
- Position: Prop
- Current team: Sale Sharks
Youth career
- Worcester Warriors
- Wasps
Senior career
Years	Team	Apps	(Points)
2023–	Sale Sharks	28	(5)
- Correct as of 21 March 2025
International career
Years	Team	Apps	(Points)
2023–2024	England U20	19	(5)
2024–	England A	1	(0)
2024–	England	6	(0)
- Correct as of 19 July 2025

Asher Opoku-Fordjour (born 16 July 2004) is an English professional rugby union player who plays as a prop forward for Premiership club Sale Sharks and the England national team.

== Early life ==
Born in Coventry, the youngest of six brothers, Opoku-Fordjour moved when he was 16 years old to Oxford, where he attended City of Oxford College. Opoku-Fordjour had started playing rugby union at 10 years of age for Broadstreet Rugby Club and initially played on the wing, before moving to flanker, hooker, and then finally prop. He was released from the Worcester Warriors academy in his teens.

== Club career ==
Opoku-Fordjour played rugby for Kenilworth RFC in Warwickshire and played for the academy side of Wasps RFC. However, after Wasps disbanded due to financial reasons, he joined Sale Sharks in November 2022. He played on loan in the National Rugby League with both Stourbridge and Sedgley Tigers during the 2022–23 season.

Opoku-Fordjour made his debut for Sale in the Premiership Rugby Cup at the start of the 2023–24 season. He made his Rugby Premiership debut for Sale against Newcastle Falcons on 17 November 2023. Opoku-Fordjour was voted the RPA's 15 under 23 MVP of the month for December 2023.

In December 2024, Opoku-Fordjour scored his first try for his club in the Premiership finding a gap next to a ruck to score under the posts against Leicester Tigers as Sale went on to win 39–25. In January 2025, he signed a new three-year deal with the club. He started his first playoff game in Sale's semi-final loss to Leicester Tigers at the end of the 2024-25 season.

== International career ==
Opoku-Fordjour was a member of the National Trust and England under-20 side that finished fourth at the 2023 World Rugby U20 Championship and scored his only try at international youth level in pool stage draw with Ireland. He won the 2024 U20 Six Nations Championship with England, starting all five games in the front row. Opoku-Fordjour was included in the squad for the 2024 World Rugby U20 Championship and started in the final as England defeated France at Cape Town Stadium to become Champions.

In November 2024 Opoku-Fordjour started for England A in a victory over Australia A at Twickenham Stoop. That same month he received his first call-up to the senior England squad for the Autumn internationals. Opoku-Fordjour was named amongst the replacements for their last Test of the calendar year against Japan on 24 November 2024, and made his international debut by coming on as a substitute in the 55th minute.

On 8 June 2025 Opoku-Fordjour was called up to the British & Irish Lions training squad for their match against Argentina as part of the 2025 Lions Tour. After providing injury cover for the Lions he returned to the England squad for their 2025 summer tour and came off the bench as a substitute in both tests against Argentina as England completed a series win. The following week saw Opoku-Fordjour make his first start in their last game of the tour against USA. He also featured for England against Australia and Argentina in the 2025 autumn internationals, but was ruled out of the 2026 Six Nations with a shoulder injury.

== Personal life ==
Opoku-Fordjour has Ghanaian heritage with family living in Accra. His brother David Opoku-Fordjour is also a rugby union player.
