= James Johnston (rugby union) =

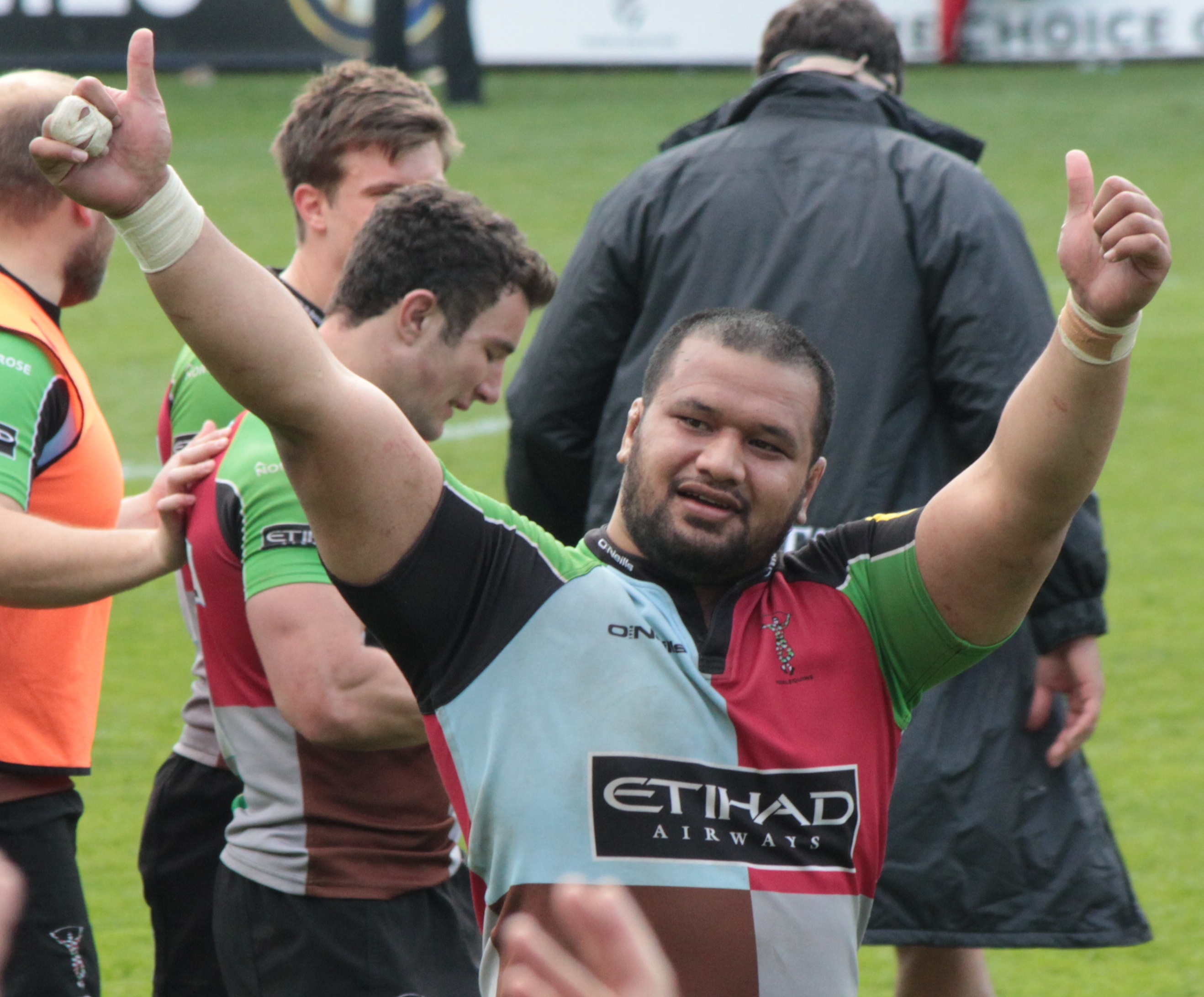
- Born: 6 March 1986 (age 40) Auckland, New Zealand
- Height: 1.88 m (6 ft 2 in)
- Weight: 140 kg (22 st 1 lb; 309 lb)
- Notable relative: Census Johnston

Rugby union career
- Position: Tighthead Prop
- Current team: Ampthill Rugby
Senior career
Years	Team	Apps	(Points)
2009–2013	Harlequins	102	(10)
2013–2015	Saracens	51	(10)
2015–2016	Wasps	2	(16)
2016–2017	Worcester Warriors	20	(32)
2017-2020	Brive	6	(0)
2020–	Rouen		
–	Nice Rugby		
–	Ampthill RUFC		
2026-	Chinnor RFC		
- Correct as of 30 June 2016
International career
Years	Team	Apps	(Points)
2008–	Samoa	16	(5)
- Correct as of 30 June 2016

James Johnston (born 6 March 1986) is a New Zealand rugby union player of Samoan descent who currently plays for Ampthill RUFC (2023-2024) and has represented Samoa. He has played club rugby for Wasps, Harlequins and Saracens in the then Aviva Premiership. He plays at tighthead prop. He has represented Samoa. Johnston lived in Surbiton whilst playing for Harlequins, before making the move to St Albans upon signing for Saracens in 2013. He started for Harlequins in their 2011–12 Premiership final victory over Leicester Tigers.

On 15 June 2015, James signs for Premiership rivals Wasps for the upcoming 2015–16 season. He left Wasps and announced his signing for Premiership rivals Worcester Warriors.

Johnson left Worcester as he moved to France to join Top 14 side Brive ahead of the 2017–18 season. On 11 June 2020, Johnston signed for Rouen in the French second division Pro D2 from the 2020–21 season.

He signed for Ampthill RUFC for the 2023-24 season from Stade Nicois (Nice Rugby).
