= Sam Kildunne =

English rugby union player (born 2002)

- Born: 22 December 2002 (age 23)
- Height: 1.85 m (6 ft 1 in)
- Weight: 86 kg (190 lb)
- School: Woodhouse Grove School
- University: Loughborough University
- Notable relative: Ellie Kildunne (sister)

Rugby union career
- Position: Winger
- Current team: Ampthill
Senior career
Years	Team	Apps	(Points)
2025-	Ampthill		
National sevens team
Years	Team		Comps
2022-	England Sevens		

Sam Kildunne (born 22 December 2002) is an English rugby union footballer who plays as a winger for Champ Rugby side Ampthill. He is an England Rugby Sevens international.

== Early life ==
From Riddlesden, in West Yorkshire, Kildunne attended Woodhouse Grove School in Bradford prior to studying for a Sports Management undergraduate degree and a master's degree in Business Marketing at Loughborough University. Whilst at Loughborough, he spent four years playing for Loughborough Students RUFC in the fourth tier of English Rugby, National Two, his teammates including Jack Bracken. Kildunne also helped Loughborough to win their first BUCS (British Universities and Colleges Sport) Super Rugby title in 2024.

== Club career ==
Kildunne was scouted by Ampthill RUFC Director of Rugby Dave Ward whilst playing in the London Floodlit 7s hosted by Rosslyn Park. In October 2025, Kildunne scored on his debut for Ampthill in a 45-24 victory over Cambridge RUFC in the club's opening fixture of the 2025-26 Champ Rugby season.

== International career ==
Kildunne has played Rugby Sevens for England Sevens and Team GB Sevens. He made his debut for England Sevens in June 2022. In 2025, he played in the Safari Sevens in Kenya where he was named in the team of the tournament and finished as top try-scorer overall with nine.

== Personal life ==
His sister Ellie Kildunne is an England international rugby union player. The pair trained together for fitness during the Covid-19 pandemic.
