= Luka Azariashvili =

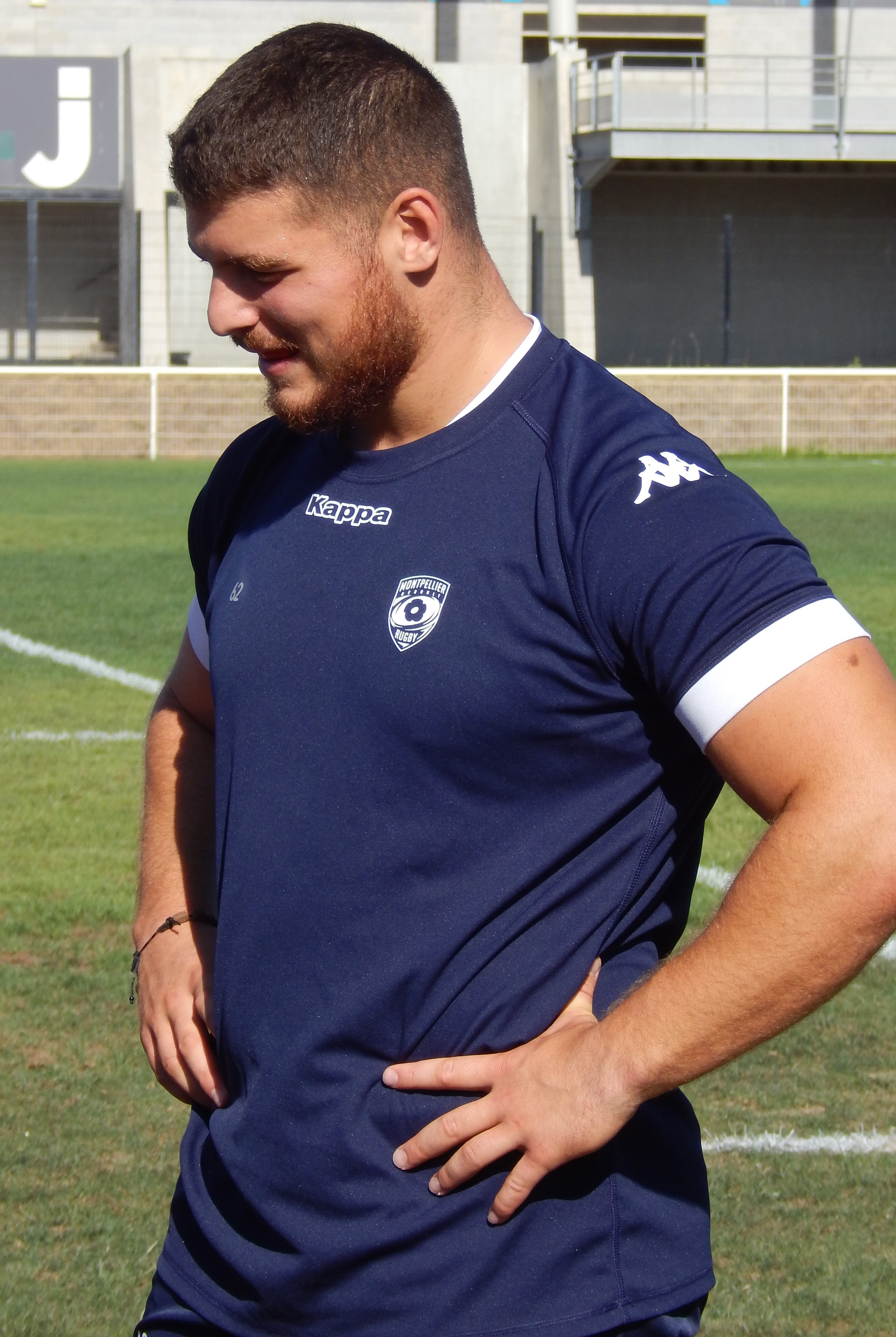
- Born: Luka Azariashvili; 30 November 1999 (age 26) Tbilisi, Georgia
- Height: 1.85 m (6 ft 1 in)
- Weight: 130 kg (20 st 7 lb; 290 lb)

Rugby union career
- Position: Tighthead prop
Senior career
Years	Team	Apps	(Points)
2016–2020	Montpellier	6	(0)
2020	Biarritz Olympique	21	(0)
International career
Years	Team	Apps	(Points)
2016-2017	Georgia U18	6	(0)
2018-2019	Georgia U20	4	(0)

Luka Azariashvili (born 30 November 1999 in Tbilisi, Georgia) is a rugby union player who currently plays for Montpellier in the Top 14 and Biarritz Olympique in the Rugby top 14 (loan) and also plays internationally for Georgia U20 as a Tighthead prop.
