= James Harper (rugby union) =

English rugby union player (born 2000)

- Born: 16 October 2000 (age 26) Liverpool, England
- Height: 191 cm (6 ft 3 in)
- Weight: 126 kg (19 st 12 lb)
- School: Merchant Taylors' Boys' School, Crosby

Rugby union career
- Position: Tighthead Prop
- Current team: Sale Sharks
Youth career
- Southport RFC
Senior career
Years	Team	Apps	(Points)
2021–	Sale Sharks	54	(10)
2021–2022	→ Caldy (loan)	1	(0)
2021–2022	→ Coventry (loan)	4	(5)
2022	→ Western Sydney (loan)	-	(-)
- Correct as of 1 June 2024
International career
Years	Team	Apps	(Points)
2019	England U18s	1	(0)
- Correct as of 1 June 2024

James Harper (born 16 October 2000) is an English professional rugby union player who plays as a prop forward for Sale Sharks.

== Early life ==
Harper attended Merchant Taylors' Boys School in Great Crosby, Merseyside, where he started playing rugby union aged eleven years-old. He played rugby union at county level for Lancashire, and for Waterloo and Southport RFC.

== Club career ==
Harper joined the Sale Sharks academy from Southport RFC whilst in his teens. After progressing through the academy, he made his Premiership Rugby debut against London Irish on 21 March 2021.

Harper spent time on loan at Caldy RFC, and he helped them to win the 2021–22 National League 1 title. He has also spent time on loan at Coventry R.F.C. and playing in the Shute Shield for Australian side Western Sydney Two Blues.

In September 2022, Harper signed a new four-year contract with Sale. He started for the Sharks side that were eliminated in the semi-final of the 2024 Premiership by Bath.

== International career ==
In March 2019 Harper represented England under-18 against France. In February 2024 he was called up to the England A team.
