= List of 2026–27 Super Rugby transfers =

This is a list of player transfers involving Super Rugby teams before or during 2027 Super Rugby Pacific season.

== Blues ==
=== Players in ===
- (New Zealand) Rieko Ioane from (Ireland) Leinster
- (Australia) Darby Lancaster from (Australia) Western Force
- (New Zealand) Cam Millar from (New Zealand) Highlanders
- (New Zealand) Nic Shearer from (New Zealand) Highlanders
- (New Zealand) Ardie Savea from (Japan) Kobelco Kobe Steelers

=== Players out ===
- (New Zealand) Dalton Papali'i to (France) Castres
- (New Zealand) Hoskins Sotutu to (England) Newcastle Red Bulls
- (New Zealand) Terrell Peita to (Wales) Dragons
- (New Zealand) AJ Lam to (France) Clermont
- (New Zealand) Stephen Perofeta to (Japan) Yokohama Canon Eagles
- (Samoa) Jordan Lay retired
- (New Zealand) Kurt Eklund retired (Note: Eklund originally signed for the Yokohama Canon Eagles before suffering a neck injury during his final NPC season.)
- (New Zealand) Laghlan McWhannell to (Japan) Yokohama Canon Eagles
- (New Zealand) Corey Evans to (New Zealand) Crusaders

== Brumbies ==
=== Players in ===
- (Australia) Len Ikitau from (England) Exeter Chiefs
- (Australia) Leafi Talataina from (Australia) NSW Waratahs
- (Australia) Triston Reilly from (Australia) NSW Waratahs
- (Australia) Aiden Stait from (France) Bayonne

=== Players out ===
- (New Zealand) Tuaina Taii Tualima to (France) Colomiers
- (Australia) Luke Reimer to (Australia) NSW Waratahs
- (Australia) Cadeyrn Neville to (Australia) Queensland Reds
- (Australia) Austin Anderson released
- (Australia) Hudson Creighton released

== Chiefs ==
=== Players in ===
- (New Zealand) Anton Lienert-Brown from (Japan) Kobelco Kobe Steelers
- (New Zealand) Taha Kemara from (New Zealand) Crusaders
- (New Zealand) Tevita Mafileo from (New Zealand) Hurricanes
- (New Zealand) Daniel Lienert-Brown from (New Zealand) Highlanders

=== Players out ===
- (New Zealand) Xavier Roe to (England) Sale Sharks
- (New Zealand) Josh Jacomb to (New Zealand) Highlanders
- (New Zealand) Etene Nanai-Seturo to (France) Clermont
- (New Zealand) Liam Coombes-Fabling to (France) Oyonnax
- (Australia) Lalakai Foketi to (Wales) Ospreys
- (New Zealand) Reuben O'Neill to (Australia) Western Force
- (New Zealand) Samipeni Finau to (Japan) Yokohama Canon Eagles
- (New Zealand) Sione Ahio to (France) La Rochelle
- (New Zealand) Keran van Staden to (Japan) Kubota Spears

== Crusaders ==
=== Players in ===
- (New Zealand) Richie Mo'unga from (Japan) Toshiba Brave Lupus Tokyo
- (New Zealand) Corey Evans from (New Zealand) Blues
- (France) Clément Castets from (New Zealand) Hawke's Bay (injury replacement for Tamaiti Williams)
- (New Zealand) Feleti Sae-Taʻufoʻou from (New Zealand) Moana Pasifika
- (New Zealand) Jake Te Hiwi from (New Zealand) Highlanders

=== Players out ===
- (New Zealand) Louie Chapman to (Scotland) Edinburgh
- (New Zealand) Braydon Ennor to (France) Perpignan
- (New Zealand) Dallas McLeod to (England) Exeter Chiefs
- (Fiji) Sevu Reece to (France) Perpignan
- (New Zealand) David Havili (Japan) Toshiba Brave Lupus Tokyo
- (New Zealand) Cullen Grace to (Wales) Scarlets
- (New Zealand) Antonio Shalfoon to (Japan) Shizuoka Blue Revs
- (New Zealand) Aki Tuivailala to (Japan) Shizuoka Blue Revs
- (New Zealand) Taha Kemara to (New Zealand) Chiefs

== Drua ==
=== Players in ===
- Nacani Boginisoko from Fiji Sevens
- (Fiji) Ben Volavola from (Australia) Queensland Reds
- (Australia) Isi Naisarani from (Australia) Randwick

=== Players out ===
- (Fiji) Elia Canakaivata to (England) Sale Sharks
- (Fiji) Ponepati Loganimasi to (England) Sale Sharks
- (Fiji) Simione Kuruvoli to (France) Vannes
- (Fiji) Inia Tabuavou to (France) Vannes
- (Fiji) Ilasia Droasese released
- (Fiji) Isoa Nasilasila to (Japan) JR East Green Warriors Tokatsu
- (Fiji) Etonia Waqa to (France) Provence
- (Fiji) Zuriel Togiatama to (England) Newcastle Red Bulls
- (Fiji) Joseva Tamani to (New Zealand) Highlanders

== Force ==
=== Players in ===
- (Australia) James Ramm from (England) Northampton Saints
- Wallace Charlie from Australia Sevens
- Aden Ekanayake from Australia Sevens
- (Australia) Harry McLaughlin-Phillips from (Australia) Queensland Reds
- (New Zealand) Reuben O'Neill from (New Zealand) Chiefs
- (Australia) James O'Connor from (England) Leicester Tigers

=== Players out ===
- (Australia) Darcy Swain to (France) Clermont
- (Argentina) Franco Molina to (England) Newcastle Red Bulls
- (Australia) Kane Koteka released
- (Tonga) Vaiolini Ekuasi to (France) Montauban
- (Australia) Bayley Kuenzle to (Scotland) Glasgow Warriors
- (Australia) Darby Lancaster to (New Zealand) Blues
- (New Zealand) George Bridge to (Japan) Kobelco Kobe Steelers
- (Tonga) Feao Fotuaika released
- (Australia) Titi Nofoagatotoa released
- (Australia) Harry Johnson-Holmes to (England) Harlequins
- (Australia) Henry Palmer to (England) Cornish Pirates
- (Australia) Max Burey to (Australia) NSW Waratahs

== Highlanders ==
=== Players in ===
- (New Zealand) Shannon Frizell from (Japan) Toshiba Brave Lupus Tokyo
- (New Zealand) Josh Jacomb from (New Zealand) Chiefs
- (New Zealand) Mika Muliaina from (New Zealand) Southland
- (New Zealand) Jermaine Ainsley from (France) Lyon
- (Tonga) Patrick Pellegrini from (New Zealand) Moana Pasifika
- (New Zealand) Ioane Moananu from (Australia) NSW Waratahs
- (Fiji) Joseva Tamani from (Fiji) Fijian Drua
- (Samoa) Tuna Tuitama from (New Zealand) Moana Pasifika

=== Players out ===
- (New Zealand) Sefo Kautai to (Australia) NSW Waratahs
- (New Zealand) Jonah Lowe to (Japan) Toshiba Brave Lupus Tokyo
- (New Zealand) Cam Millar to (New Zealand) Blues
- (New Zealand) Tanielu Tele'a to (Japan) Mie Honda Heat
- (New Zealand) Soane Vikena to (Japan) Urayasu D-Rocks
- (New Zealand) Nic Shearer to (New Zealand) Blues
- (New Zealand) Oliver Haig to (New Zealand) Hurricanes
- (New Zealand) Daniel Lienert-Brown to (New Zealand) Chiefs
- (New Zealand) Rohan Wingham to (New Zealand) Hurricanes
- (New Zealand) Jake Te Hiwi to (New Zealand) Crusaders

== Hurricanes ==
=== Players in ===
- (New Zealand) Oliver Haig from (New Zealand) Highlanders
- (New Zealand) Hunter Morrison from (New Zealand) Hawke's Bay
- (New Zealand) Semisi Tupou Ta'eiloa from (New Zealand) Moana Pasifika
- (New Zealand) Rohan Wingham from (New Zealand) Highlanders

=== Players out ===
- (New Zealand) Pouri Rakete-Stones to (England) Newcastle Red Bulls
- (New Zealand) Isaia Walker-Leawere to (Italy) Benetton
- (Japan) Warner Dearns to (Japan) Toshiba Brave Lupus Tokyo
- (New Zealand) Devan Flanders to (Japan) Urayasu D-Rocks
- (Samoa) Ere Enari to (Wales) Dragons
- (New Zealand) Riley Higgins to (Scotland) Edinburgh
- (New Zealand) Tom Allen to (Wales) Scarlets
- (New Zealand) Bailyn Sullivan to (Japan) Kubota Spears
- (New Zealand) Tevita Mafileo to (New Zealand) Chiefs
- (New Zealand) Lucas Cashmore released

== Moana Pasifika ==
(Note: Team disbanded at the end of the 2026 season)

=== Players out ===
- (Japan) Mamoru Harada to (Japan) Toshiba Brave Lupus Tokyo
- (Samoa) Lalomilo Lalomilo to (France) Grenoble
- (Samoa) Mills Sanerivi to (France) Vannes
- (England) Tom Savage to (England) Worcester Warriors
- (Samoa) Faletoi Peni to (France) Narbonne
- (Tonga) Semisi Paea to (Wales) Cardiff
- (Tonga) Patrick Pellegrini to (New Zealand) Highlanders
- (New Zealand) Abraham Pole to (France) Narbonne
- (Tonga) Veikoso Poloniati to (Australia) NSW Waratahs
- (New Zealand) Solomon Alaimalo to (France) Narbonne
- (Samoa) Tuna Tuitama to (New Zealand) Highlanders
- (New Zealand) Chris Apoua to (Wales) Scarlets
- (Tonga) Sam Moli to (England) Leicester Tigers
- (Tonga) Atu Moli to (Japan) Toshiba Brave Lupus Musashi
- (New Zealand) Semisi Tupou Ta'eiloa to (New Zealand) Hurricanes
- (Samoa) Miracle Fai'ilagi to (Japan) JR East Green Warriors Tokatsu
- (New Zealand) Feleti Sae-Taʻufoʻou to (New Zealand) Crusaders
- (New Zealand) Dominic Ropeti to (Japan) Kobelco Kobe Steelers

== Reds ==
=== Players in ===
- (Australia) Tom Lambert from (Australia) NSW Waratahs
- (Australia) Cadeyrn Neville from (Australia) ACT Brumbies
- (Australia) Izaia Perese from (England) Leicester Tigers

=== Players out ===
- (Australia) Louis Werchon to (Italy) Benetton
- (Australia) Josh Flook to (Italy) Benetton
- (New Zealand) Richie Asiata released
- (New Zealand) Heremaia Murray released
- (Samoa) Jeffrey Toomaga-Allen released
- (Australia) Harry McLaughlin-Phillips to (Australia) Western Force
- (Fiji) Ben Volavola to (Fiji) Fijian Drua
- (Fiji) Seru Uru to (France) Racing 92
- (Australia) Hunter Paisami to (Japan) Shizuoka Blue Revs

== Waratahs ==
=== Players in ===
- (Australia) Angus Bell from (Ireland) Ulster
- (Australia) Luke Reimer from (Australia) ACT Brumbies
- (Australia) Angus Crichton from (Australia) Sydney Roosters
- (New Zealand) Sefo Kautai from (New Zealand) Highlanders
- (Tonga) Veikoso Poloniati from (New Zealand) Moana Pasifika
- (Australia) Max Burey from (Australia) Western Force
- (Australia) Bernard Foley from (Japan) Kubota Spears
- (Australia) Nick Phipps from (Japan) Green Warriors Tokatsu

=== Players out ===
- (Australia) Joey Walton to (France) Montauban
- (Australia) Andrew Kellaway retired
- (Australia) Tom Lambert to (Australia) Queensland Reds
- (England) Jamie Adamson released
- (Australia) Jack Debreczeni released
- (New Zealand) Charlie Gamble to (Japan) JR East Green Warriors Tokatsu
- (New Zealand) Ioane Moananu to (New Zealand) Highlanders
- (Ireland) Michael McDonald released
- (Australia) Leafi Talataina to (Australia) ACT Brumbies
- (Australia) Lawson Creighton to (Wales) Ospreys
- (Australia) Triston Reilly to (Australia) ACT Brumbies
- (Australia) Angus Blyth to (Japan) Toyota Industries Shuttles Aichi
- (Australia) Ben Grant released
- (Australia) Jack Bowen to (Japan) Mitsubishi Sagamihara DynaBoars (on loan from (England) Leicester Tigers)

== See also ==
- List of 2026–27 Premiership Rugby transfers
- List of 2026–27 United Rugby Championship transfers
- List of 2026–27 Champ Rugby transfers
- List of 2026–27 Top 14 transfers
- SANZAAR
- Super Rugby franchise areas
