= Dom Hardman =

English rugby union player

- Born: Dominic Hardman; 24 August 1997 (age 29) Leeds, England
- Height: 188 cm (6 ft 2 in)
- Weight: 117 kg (258 lb; 18 st 6 lb)

Rugby union career
Senior career
Years	Team	Apps	(Points)
2019–	Force	6	(5)
- Correct as of 15 June 2020
Super Rugby
Years	Team	Apps	(Points)
2020–	Force		
- Correct as of 15 June 2020

Dominic Hardman (born 24 August 1997 in Leeds) is an English rugby union player who plays for the Force in Global Rapid Rugby and the Super Rugby AU competition. His original playing position is prop. He was named in the Force squad for the Global Rapid Rugby competition in 2020.
