= Lucas Tauzin =

French rugby union player

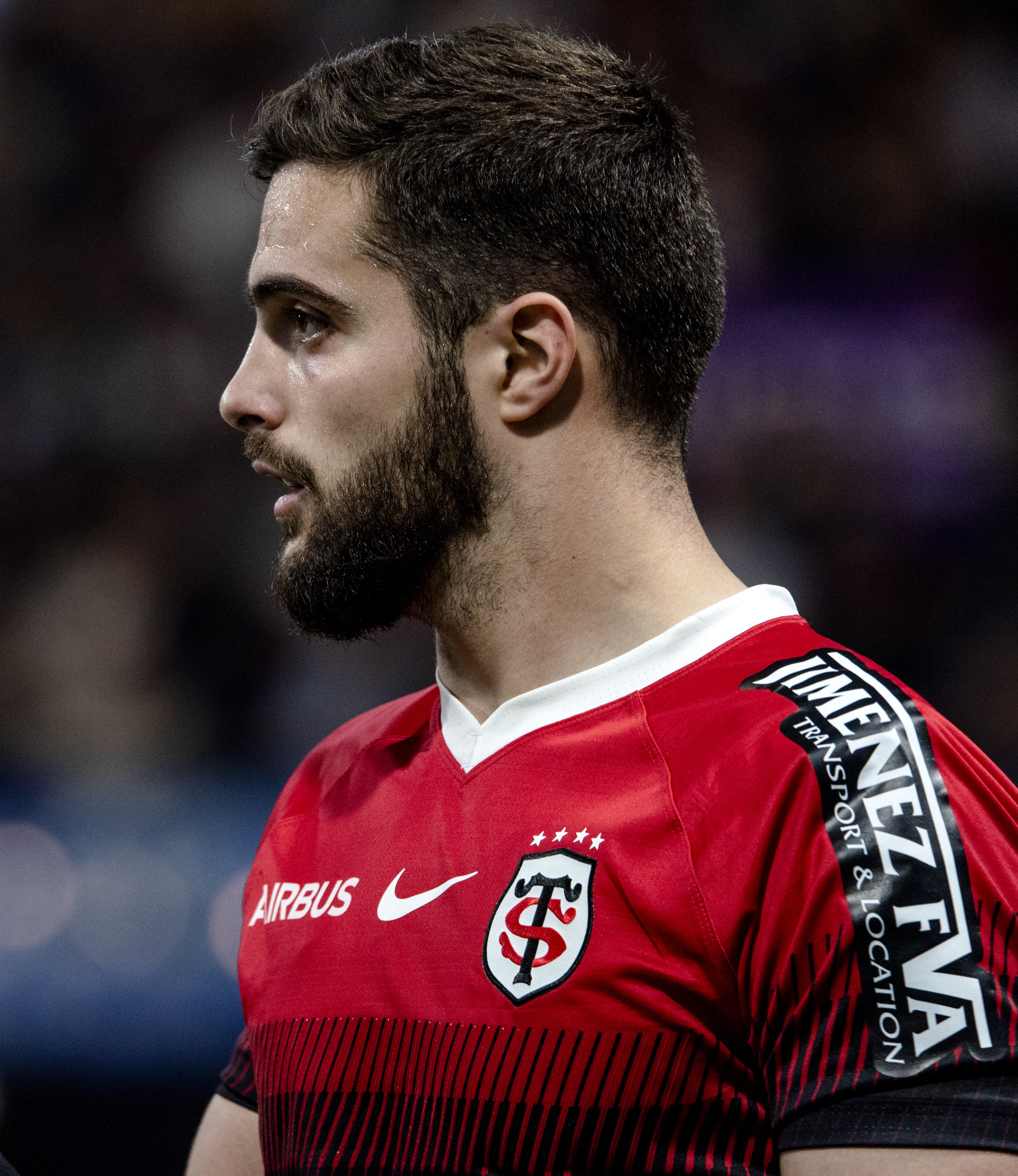
- Born: Lucas Tauzin; 21 May 1998 (age 28) Mont-de-Marsan, France
- Height: 1.87 m (6 ft 1 1/2 in)
- Weight: 94 kg (14 st 11 lb; 207 lb)

Rugby union career
- Position(s): Wing, Centre
- Current team: Toulouse
Amateur team(s)
Years	Team	Apps	(Points)
–2014	SA Saint-Sever		
2014–2016	Mont-de-Marsan		
2016–2017	Toulouse		
Senior career
Years	Team	Apps	(Points)
2017–2024	Toulouse	85	(115)
- Correct as of 23 February 2020
International career
Years	Team	Apps	(Points)
2017–2018	France U20	10	(10)
- Correct as of 17 June 2018

Lucas Tauzin (born 21 May 1998) is a French rugby union wing or centre. He currently plays for Stade Toulousain in the Top 14.

== Honours ==
=== Club ===
(France) Toulouse

- European Rugby Champions Cup: 2024
- Top 14: 2018–19

=== International ===
France (U20)

- Six Nations Under 20s Championship winners: 2018
- World Rugby Under 20 Championship winners: 2018
