= Joe Jonas (rugby union) =

South-african rugby union player

- Born: 31 December 2000 (age 25) Swellendam, South Africa
- Height: 1.80 m (5 ft 11 in)
- Weight: 90 kg (200 lb; 14 st 2 lb)
- School: Glenwood High School

Rugby union career
- Position: Wing / Fullback / Centre
- Current team: Rugby Club Vannes
Senior career
Years	Team	Apps	(Points)
2020–2024	Biarritz Olympique	64	(119)
2024-2026	Stade Français	26	(15)
2026-	Rugby Club Vannes		

Joe Jonas (born 31 December 2000), is a South African rugby player. He plays fullback at the Stade Français.

== Playing career ==
After receiving a scholarship to attend the Glenwood High School in Durban, Joe Jonas first played with the Natal Sharks, in 2020 he joined the Biarritz Olympique training centre. After competing in the Supersevens, he played his first Top 14 match against the Section Paloise in November 2021 and scored his first try in Clermont during his third start. In December 2021 he extended his contract until 2024.
