= Thomas Carol =

French rugby union player (born 2001)

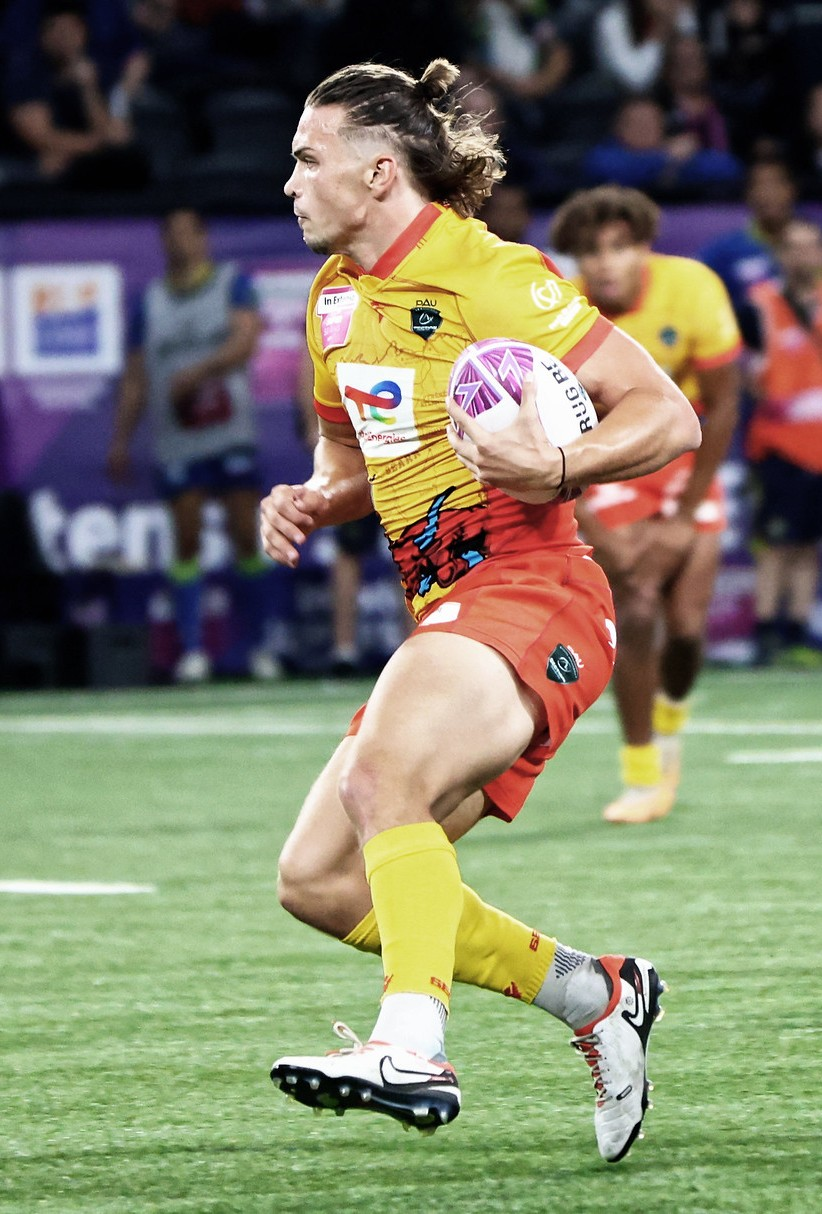
- Born: 17 January 2001 (age 25) Paris, France
- Height: 1.79 m (5 ft 10 in)
- Weight: 85 kg (187 lb)

Rugby union career
- Position: Wing
- Current team: Section Paloise
Youth career
- 2010–2012: AC Boulogne-Billancourt
- 2012–2019: Racing 92
- 2019–2021: Stade Rochelais
- 2021–2024: Section Paloise
Senior career
Years	Team	Apps	(Points)
2021–	Section Paloise	30	(10)
2021–	Total	30	(10)
- Correct as of 03 April 2024
International career
Years	Team	Apps	(Points)
2022–	France 7	43	(28)
- Correct as of 08 April 2024

Thomas Carol (born 17 January 2001) is a French rugby union player who plays as a wing for Pau in the Top 14 competition and the France 7's team. He made his Top 14 debut with his club on 9 October 2021.

== Playing career ==
=== Early career ===
Carol was born on 17 January 2001. He began his rugby career at AC Boulogne-Billancourt before making the move to Racing 92 in 2012, remaining in Île-de-France. Then, in 2019, he earned a spot in the training center of Stade Rochelais, where he garnered attention under the watchful eye of Sébastien Piqueronies.

=== Club career ===
==== Section Paloise ====
In 2021, Carol transferred to Section Paloise. He made his professional debut on 9 October 2021, facing Stade Toulousain. Throughout his inaugural season, Carol participated in 11 Top 14 matches and 3 EPCR Challenge Cup matches, gaining significant experience. In 2022, he showcased his versatility by excelling in the Supersevens with Section Paloise Sevens.

During the 2021–22 Top 14 season, Carol continued to impress with Section Paloise, scoring his first Challenge Cup try against Dragons RFC on December 17, 2022.

Carol spent the 2022–23 season focusing on rugby sevens.

In the 2023–24 Top 14 season, he earned more starts in both Top 14 and Challenge Cup matches despite competition from Jack Maddocks and the emergence of Théo Attissogbé. Notably, Carol started as a winger in the opening Top 14 match against Castres Olympique, underscoring his growing significance within the team.

In January 2024, Section Paloise announced Carol's signing of his inaugural two-season professional contract, extending his tenure until June 2026.
