= Eliot Salt (rugby union) =

English rugby union player (born 2001)

- Born: Eliot Salt; 28 January 2000 (age 26) Cornwall, England
- Height: 6 ft 1 in (1.85 m)
- Weight: 125 kg (19 st 10 lb; 276 lb)
- University: Cardiff Metropolitan University

Rugby union career
- Position: Prop
- Current team: Gloucester
Senior career
Years	Team	Apps	(Points)
2023–2026	Coventry	69	(20)
2026–	Gloucester	0	(0)
- Correct as of 12 August 2026

Eliot Salt (born 28 January 2000) is an English rugby union player who plays for Gloucester in the Premiership Rugby. His main position is prop.

Originally was part of Exeter Chiefs academy, Salt left to study at Cardiff Metropolitan University in Sport Performance Analysis degree and a master's degree in Data Science where he competed in BUCS Super Rugby.

On 27 April 2023, Salt signed his first professional contract with Coventry in the RFU Championship ahead of the 2023–24 season. Eliot has become a mainstay of the front row, making 69 appearances for the club, scoring 4 tries throughout his time at the club. Salt originally re-signed with the club for the 2026–27 season but withdrawn from the deal to take an opportunity with Gloucester in the Premiership Rugby on an undisclosed deal for the new season.
