= Aymeric Luc =

French rugby union player

- Born: 14 October 1997 (age 29) France
- Height: 1.80 m (5 ft 11 in)
- Weight: 76 kg (168 lb)

Rugby union career
- Position(s): Fullback, Wing
- Current team: Toulon
Youth career
- 2004–2009: Boucau Tarnos
- 2009–2019: Bayonne
Senior career
Years	Team	Apps	(Points)
2019–2021	Bayonne	44	(80)
2021–	Toulon	55	(70)
- Correct as of 26 October 2021

Aymeric Luc (born 14 October 1997) is a French rugby union player, who plays for RC Toulon.

He was first called to the French national senior team by Fabien Galthié on the 26 October 2021, for the autumn internationals, after Virimi Vakatawa was ruled-out through injury.
