= Lefty Zigiriadis =

- Born: Lefty Zigiriadis; 10 September 2001 (age 25) Pretoria, South Africa
- Height: 1.82 m (5 ft 11 1/2 in)
- Weight: 116 kg (18.3 st; 256 lb)
- School: Hilton College
- University: Brunel University of London

Rugby union career
- Position: Loosehead Prop
Amateur team(s)
Years	Team	Apps	(Points)
- Ealing Trailfinders Academy
Senior career
Years	Team	Apps	(Points)
2022–2026	Ealing Trailfinders	31	(5)
2023–2024	→ Cornish Pirates (loan)	19	(0)
2026–	Northampton Saints	0	(0)
- Correct as of 29 March 2026

Lefty Zigiradis (born 10 September 2001) is a South African rugby union player who plays for Northampton Saints in the Gallagher Premiership .

Born in Pretoria, Zigiriadis attended Waterkloof Primary and Hilton College in South Africa before moving to the UK to join the Ealing Trailfinders rugby academy. He spent three years within Ealings system while studying Economics and Accounting at Brunel University of London, later completing a master's degree in Banking and Finance. Zigiradis played a key role in Brunel's run to the BUCS play-offs and earning the Players’ Player of the Year award for the Men's Academy at Trailfinders in 2023. He made his senior debut against Championship rivals Cornish Pirates back in March 2023.

On 16 June 2023, Zigiraodis joined Cornish Pirates on a season-long loan in the RFU Championship for the 2023–24 season. He featured 19 times across the Championship and Premiership Rugby Cup for Cornish Pirates, winning the club's Player of the Year award, before returning to Trailfinders next season. The prop enjoyed his most productive season in an Ealing shirt to date in 2024/25 season, making 22 appearances. Further outings this season have taken his overall tally for Trailfinders to 30 appearances.

On 17 March 2026, Zigiraidis would leave Ealing to join Northampton Saints in the Premiership Rugby from the 2026–27 season.
