= Angus Williams (rugby union) =

New Zealand rugby union player

- Born: 11 November 1993 (age 33) Whitianga, New Zealand
- Height: 1.79 m (5 ft 10 in)
- Weight: 117 kg (18 st 6 lb)

Rugby union career
- Position: Tighthead Prop
- Current team: Edinburgh Rugby
Senior career
Years	Team	Apps	(Points)
2018	Otago	1	(0)
2021–	Edinburgh Rugby	26	(0)
- Correct as of 29 May 2024

Angus Williams (born 11 November 1993) is a New Zealand rugby union player who currently plays for Edinburgh Rugby in the United Rugby Championship.

== Rugby Union career ==
=== Professional career ===
Williams represented Otago in the 2018 Mitre 10 Cup. He was named in the Edinburgh Rugby squad for their Round 15 match of the 2020–21 Pro14 against Connacht.
