= Steele Barker =

English rugby union player (born 2001)

- Born: 12 January 2001 (age 25) York
- Height: 1.98 m (6 ft 6 in)
- Weight: 120 kg (265 lb)
- University: University of Exeter

Rugby union career
- Position: Lock
- Current team: Bristol Bears
Senior career
Years	Team	Apps	(Points)
- Penryn
- Redruth
2021-2024	Cornish Pirates		
2024-	Bristol		

Steele Barker (born 12 January 2001) is an English professional rugby union footballer who plays as a second row forward for Bristol Bears.

== Early life ==
Born in York, he was a member of the Yorkshire Carnegie Academy but was released at the age of 18 years-old after being told he was considered to be "too small". He then attended the University of Exeter at the Penryn Campus.

== Career ==
He played rugby at Penryn RFC and Redruth RFC prior to joining Cornish Pirates during the 2021-2022 season. He went on to make 35 appearances for Cornish Pirates in the RFU Championship.

He signed for Bristol Bears from Cornish Pirates in April 2024. He made his Premiership Rugby debut as a replacement against Saracens on 4 January 2025.
