= Hugh Bokenham =

Australian rugby union player

- Full name: Hugh Bokenham
- Born: 20 July 2001 (age 25) Sydney, Australia
- Height: 1.94 m (6 ft 4 in)
- Weight: 110 kg (17 st 5 lb; 243 lb)
- School: St Joseph's College, Hunters Hill

Rugby union career
- Position: Lock/Flanker
Youth career
- Orange County RFC
Amateur team(s)
Years	Team	Apps	(Points)
2019–2023	Sydney University		
Senior career
Years	Team	Apps	(Points)
2021–2022	Waratahs		
2022–2023	Green Rockets Tokatsu		
2023–2025	Cornish Pirates	38	(45)
2025–2026	Gloucester	8	(0)
2026	→ Worcester Warriors (loan)	10	(10)
2026–	Cornish Pirates	0	(0)
- Correct as of 4 Mar 2026
International career
Years	Team	Apps	(Points)
2017–2018	Australia Schoolboys		
2018–2019	Australia U18s		
- Correct as of 22 June 2025

Hugh Bokenham (born 20 July 2001) is an Australian rugby union player who competes for Gloucester in the Premiership Rugby.

Bokenham first played rugby at the age of six for Orange City rugby club in Orange. Hugh was later educated at St Joseph's College, Hunters Hill, in New South Wales region. He represented Australia at Schoolboys and the U18s side. He has also played for Sydney University in the Shute Shield competition and for Waratahs in Super Rugby Pacific. During the 2022–23 season, Bokenham featured in Japan for Green Rockets Tokatsu in the League One competition.

On 13 September 2023, Bokenham would move to England to sign for Cornish Pirates in the RFU Championship for the 2023–24 season. He made quite an impression for the club and in total made 23 appearances during his first season. Also he was selected for the Championship clubs’ Dream Team in the same season. On 13 May 2024, Bokenham signed a new contract to stay with the Championship club for the 2024–25 season.

On 14 May 2025, it was confirmed that Bokenham would leave the Pirates to move up to the English Premiership as he signs for Gloucester for the 2025–26 season. On 20 March 2026, Bokenham would join local rivals Worcester Warriors back in the RFU Championship on loan for the rest of the season, for further game time.

On 1 May 2026, Bokenham rejoins Cornish Pirates back in the Championship following a season with Gloucester, for the 2026-27 season.
