= Ion Neculai =

Italy international rugby union player

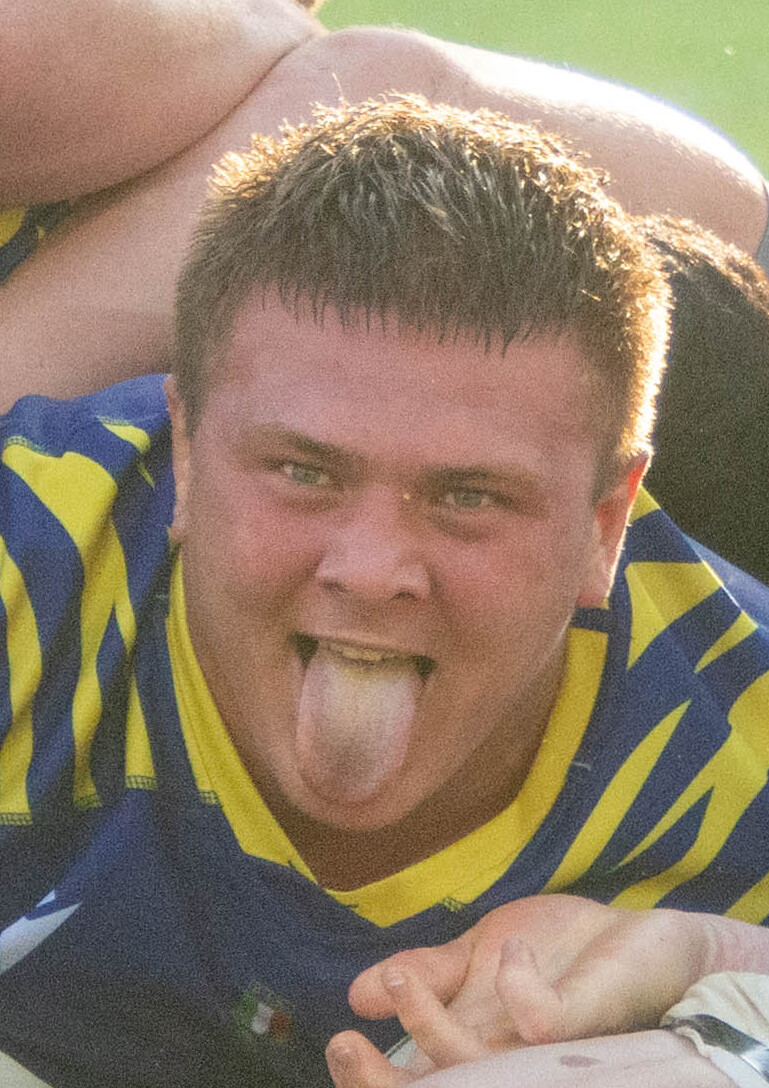
- Born: 25 January 2001 (age 25) Chișinău, Moldova
- Height: 189 cm (6 ft 2 in)
- Weight: 132 kg (291 lb; 20 st 11 lb)

Rugby union career
- Position: Prop
- Current team: Northampton Saints
Youth career
- Elba Rugby, Rugby Club I Cavalieri Prato
Senior career
| Years | Team | Apps | (Points) |
| 2019–2021 | F.I.R. Academy | | |
| 2021–2026 | Zebre Parma | 51 | (5) |
| 2026– | Northampton Saints | | |
- Correct as of 9 Aug 2026
International career
| Years | Team | Apps | (Points) |
| 2020–2021 | Italy U20 | 8 | (15) |
| 2021 | Italy A | 2 | (0) |
| 2022– | Italy | 4 | (0) |
- Correct as of 9 Aug 2026

Ion Neculai (born 25 January 2001) is a Moldovan-born Italian professional rugby union player who plays prop for Northampton Saints in the Gallagher PREM.

== Professional career ==
Neculai has previously played for clubs such as Elba Rugby and I Cavalieri in the past. He signed for Zebre in July 2021 ahead of the 2021–22 United Rugby Championship. He made his debut in Round 1 of the 2021–22 season against the Lions.

In 2020 and 2021 Neculai was named in Italy U20s squad for annual Six Nations Under 20s Championship. On 14 October 2021, he was selected by Alessandro Troncon to be part of an Italy A 28-man squad for the 2021 end-of-year rugby union internationals. On 30 May 2022, Neculai was selected by Kieran Crowley to be part of an Italy 33-man squad for the 2022 mid-year rugby union tests. He made his debut against Portugal.

At the end of the 2025–26 season, he left Zebre Parma and joined English side Northampton Saints in the Gallagher PREM for the 2026–27 season.
