= Will Davies-King =

English rugby union player

- Born: 28 July 1998 (age 28) Reading, Berkshire, England
- Height: 193 cm (6 ft 4 in)
- Weight: 126 kg (19 st 12 lb)

Rugby union career
- Current team: Cardiff Rugby
Senior career
Years	Team	Apps	(Points)
2019–	Cardiff Rugby	37	(0)
International career
Years	Team	Apps	(Points)
2018	Wales U20	3	(0)

Will Davies-King (born 28 July 1998) is a Welsh rugby union player who plays for Cardiff Rugby as a prop. He was a Wales under-20 international despite being born in England and has since been chosen for Warren Gatland's training squad for the 2023 Rugby World Cup, with Davies-King later withdrawing due to injury.

== Club career ==
Davies-King made his debut for the Cardiff team in 2019 having previously played for the Cardiff academy and Cardiff RFC.

== International career ==
On 1 May 2023, Warren Gatland selected him in Wales' 54 player training squad for the Rugby World Cup 2023.

Will Davies-King was raised in Chepstow and educated at King's school in Gloucester on a rugby scholarship, before returning to Wales to study at the Cardiff Met college whilst juggling his professional rugby career.
