= Mikey Summerfield =

English rugby union player (born 2002)

- Born: 30 October 2002 (age 24)
- Height: 1.82 m (6 ft 0 in)
- Weight: 115 kg (18 st 2 lb; 254 lb)
- School: Hartpury College

Rugby union career
- Position: Prop
- Current team: Bath
Senior career
Years	Team	Apps	(Points)
2022–2023	London Irish	4	(0)
2023–	Bath	11	(0)
2025	→ Worcester Warriors (loan)	3	(0)
- Correct as of 1 May 2026

Mikey Summerfield (born 30 October 2002) is an English rugby union footballer who plays for Bath Rugby. His preferred position is prop.

== Biography ==
A front row forward, Summerfield started playing rugby union at the age of nine years-old, at his local club Andover. He was a member of London Irish from the age of 13, and was a member of the London Irish side that won the U18 Premiership Academy League in 2018.

Summerfield attended Hartpury College and played for England U18, progressing to play all five games for England U20 during the 2022 under-20 Six Nations. He helped London Irish reach the final of the 2022-23 Premiership Rugby Cup. He joined Bath Rugby in 2023.

Summerfield made his Bath debut in the Premiership Rugby Cup during the 2023-24 season, against Cornish Pirates. In May 2025, he had his contract extended by Bath.

In October 2025, he joined the newly-reformed Worcester Warriors on loan to play in the RFU Championship. That month, he made his debut off the bench against Hartpury and started his first game the following week against Ampthill.
