= James Fender =

Welsh rugby union footballer

- Born: James Christopher Fender; 3 August 2001 (age 25) Swansea, Wales
- Height: 201 cm (6 ft 7 in)
- Weight: 125 kg (276 lb)
- School: Bishopston Comprehensive School
- University: Neath Port Talbot College

Rugby union career
- Position: Lock
- Current team: Ospreys
Youth career
- South Gower RFC
Senior career
Years	Team	Apps	(Points)
2020–	Ospreys	32	(0)
2022–23	→Cornish Pirates (loan)	13	(5)
International career
Years	Team	Apps	(Points)
2020–2021	Wales U20	9	(0)

James Christopher Fender is a Welsh professional rugby union player, who plays for the Ospreys in the United Rugby Championship as a lock.

== Club career ==
=== Ospreys ===
As a youth player, Fender was part of the Ospreys academy. He played for South Gower and Neath Port Talbot College, as well as Swansea RFC.

For the 2022–2023 season, Fender was loaned to RFU Championship side Cornish Pirates.

Fender was recalled to the Ospreys squad ahead of their URC tour to South Africa, and made his debut as a replacement on 26 November 2022, against the Bulls.

Fender was named as Man of the Match on 26 December 2023, as the Ospreys beat the Scarlets 25–11. Following his early season performances, Fender was named as a top breakthrough player for 2023. He was tipped for a place in the Wales squad ahead of the 2024 Six Nations, but suffered a shoulder injury in January 2024, ruling him out long term.

On 19 April 2024, Fender signed a contract extension with the Ospreys.

Fender returned from injury in November 2024 to play for the Ospreys in a development fixture. He received a red card against Cardiff for a dangerous clear out on 1 January 2025.

Fender was pursued by FC Grenoble Rugby ahead of the 2025–26 season, but the move collapsed over concerns over his international eligibility.

== International career ==
=== Wales U20 ===
Fender represented Wales U20 in the U20 Six Nations tournament in 2020 and 2021.

=== Wales ===
On 21 October 2025, Fender was selected by Wales for the 2025 end-of-year rugby union internationals. Fender was slated to make his debut in the final fixture against South Africa, but ruled out due to a recurring shoulder injury.
