= John Hawkins (rugby union) =

English rugby union player

- Born: John Hawkins; 11 November 1996 (age 30) Bedford, England
- Height: 1.96 m (6 ft 5 in)
- Weight: 117 kg (18 st 6 lb)
- School: Stowe School

Rugby union career
- Position: Lock/Backrow
Amateur team(s)
Years	Team	Apps	(Points)
- Northampton Saints Academy
Senior career
Years	Team	Apps	(Points)
2018–2023	Bristol Bears	37	(0)
2023	Jersey Reds	3	(0)
2023–	Newcastle Falcons	13	(0)
- Correct as of 28 July 2024

John Hawkins (born 11 November 1996) is an English rugby union player who competes with Newcastle Falcons in the Premiership Rugby.

== Career ==
Hawkins captained Stowe School and Northampton Saints U18s and represented England versus Wales and France in that age-group. He joined Bristol Bears from Northampton Saints Elite Player Development Group squad. He made his Bristol debut from the bench against his old club Northampton in the Premiership Rugby Cup back in October 2018. In 2019, Hawkins made his Premiership debut against Wasps at Ashton Gate.

On 15 June 2023, Hawkins signed for Jersey Reds in the RFU Championship for the 2023–24 season. After making three senior appearances, Jersey Reds entered liquidation due to financial problems and therefore ceased trading in the Championship. Therefore, Hawkins returned to the Premiership to sign for Newcastle Falcons on a deal until the end of the 2024–25 season. He made his debut for Newcastle in 14–16 loss to Northampton in the Premiership in October 2023.
