= Kofi Cripps =

English rugby union player

- Born: Kofi Cripps; 3 April 2003 (age 23) Chalfont St Peter, Buckinghamshire, England
- Height: 1.84 m (6 ft 0 in)
- Weight: 94 kg (14 st 11 lb)
- School: Rugby School

Rugby union career
- Position(s): Openside Flanker, Number 8
Senior career
Years	Team	Apps	(Points)
2021–2023	Wasps	2	(0)
2023–2024	Clifton	25	(0)
2024–2026	Bristol Bears	7	(0)
2026–	Worcester Warriors	0	(0)
- Correct as of 10 December 2024
International career
Years	Team	Apps	(Points)
2021–2022	England U18s	0	(0)
2022–2023	England U20s	2	(0)

Kofi Cripps (born 3 April 2003) is an English rugby union player who plays for Worcester Warriors in the RFU Championship.

Originally part of the Wasps academy system, Cripps represented England U18s in their Six Nations festival as well as England U20s during the 2022 Six Nations Under 20s Championship, both against Scotland U20s and Wales U20s.

On 18 October 2022 all Wasps players had their contacts terminated due to the liquidation of the company to which they were contracted. Since his contract was terminated, Cripps played for fourth tier side Clifton in the National League 2 West for the 2023–24 season.

On 22 February 2024, Cripps would sign for Premiership side Bristol Bears from the 2024–25 season, after making an appearance for them in the Premiership Rugby Cup against Exeter Chiefs.

On 20 August 2026, Cripps moves to local rivals Worcester Warriors in the RFU Championship from the 2026-27 season with immediate effect.
