= Freddie Lockwood =

English rugby union player (born 2000)

- Born: 31 December 2000 (age 25) Scarborough
- Height: 1.88 m (6 ft 2 in)
- Weight: 116 kg (256 lb; 18 st 4 lb)

Rugby union career
- Position: Back row
- Current team: US Dax
Senior career
Years	Team	Apps	(Points)
2018–2026	Newcastle Falcons	85	(70)
2022–2023	→ Jersey Reds (loan)	0	(0)
2026-	US Dax		

Freddie Lockwood (born 31 December 2000) is an English professional rugby union footballer who plays as a back row forward for Premiership Rugby club Newcastle Falcons.

== Early life ==
He attended Barnard Castle School and played junior club rugby at Malton & Norton Representing the first 1st XV twice scoring three tries as a 17 year old in North East One. Represented Durham county and then Newcastle Flacons academy shortly after. Also represented the north of England lambs

== Career ==
He played as a youngster on dual-registration for Blaydon and Darlington Mowden Park, and made his first-team debut for Newcastle Falcons during the 2020-21 season in the EPCR Challenge Cup win at French club Castres.

He made six appearances in the Rugby Premiership for Newcastle Falcons during the 2021-22 season, after making his debut against Harlequins. He joined RFU Championship side Jersey Reds for the 2022-23 season.

In January 2024, he signed a new two-year contract with Newcastle Falcons having made 39 appearances for the club.
