= Lasha Macharashvili =

- Born: Lasha Macharashvili; 13 November 1998 (age 28) Tbilisi, Georgia
- Height: 1.91 m (6 ft 3 in)
- Weight: 128 kg (20 st 2 lb; 282 lb)

Rugby union career
- Position: Tighthead prop
Senior career
Years	Team	Apps	(Points)
2017–	Stade Montois	0	(0)
International career
Years	Team	Apps	(Points)
2017-	Georgia U20	6	(0)

Lasha Macharashvili (born 13 November 1998) is a rugby union player who currently plays for Stade Montois in the Pro D2 and also plays internationally for Georgia U20 as a prop.
