= David Opoku-Fordjour =

English rugby player (born 2003)

- Born: 1 May 2003 (age 23)
- Height: 1.81 m (5 ft 11 in)
- Weight: 91 kg (201 lb)
- Notable relative: Asher Opoku-Fordjour (brother)

Rugby union career
- Position: Wing
- Current team: Coventry
Senior career
Years	Team	Apps	(Points)
2023-2026	Coventry	52	(105)
2026–	Sale Sharks	0	(0)

David Opoku-Fordjour (born 1 May 2003) is an English rugby union footballer who plays as a winger for Champ Rugby side Coventry.

== Club career ==
A winger, Opoku-Fordjour scored 10 tries in 22 matches for Coventry R.F.C. in the 2024-25 season, including five in a single match against Nottingham Rugby. He stayed with the club for the 2025-26 Champ Rugby season and was a try scorer in the club's opening fixture on 6 October 2025 against Worcester Warriors.

On 15 April 2026, David would move up to the Premiership Rugby competition with Sale Sharks on a one-year deal, option for further season from the 2026-27 season, joining his brother Asher at the club.

== Personal life ==
His brother Asher Opoku-Fordjour is also a rugby union player. They have Ghanaian heritage with family living in Accra.
