= UJ Rugby =

UJ
- Full name: University of Johannesburg Rugby Union Team
- Nickname(s): "Orange Army"
- Location: Auckland Park
- Ground(s): UJ Stadium
- Coach(es): Jonathan Mokuena
- League(s): Varsity Rugby
- 2024: 6th

The University of Johannesburg Rugby union team, commonly known as UJ, is the rugby union team that represents the University of Johannesburg based in Auckland Park, Gauteng. It competes in the Varsity Cup.

== History ==
In 2021 the team appointed former Blikzbokke Jonathan Mokuena as head coach.

The team finished the 2024 Varsity Cup in 6th position after spending most of the season avoiding the relegation playoffs zone (7th place).

== Rivalry ==
The rivalry between UJ and Wits Rugby is known as the Joburg Derby.
