= Ioan Emanuel =

Welsh rugby union player (born 2005)

- Born: 31 January 2005 (age 21)
- Height: 1.89 m (6 ft 2 in)
- Weight: 123 kg (19 st 5 lb; 271 lb)
- School: Millfield

Rugby union career
- Position: Prop
- Current team: Bath
Senior career
Years	Team	Apps	(Points)
2024–	Bath	5	(0)
2025-2026	→ Cardiff (loan)		
2026	→ Cardiff (loan)		
International career
Years	Team	Apps	(Points)
2024-2025	Wales U20	13	(10)

Ioan Emanuel (born 31 January 2005) is a Welsh professional rugby union footballer who plays as a prop forward for Bath.

== Club career ==
He played as a youngster at Llantwit Fardre RFC and attended school at Ysgol Garth Olwg. He was then educated at Millfield in Somerset. In 2023, he signed a senior academy contract with Bath Rugby. He featured on loan for RFU Championship side Rams in the 2024-25 season. In May 2025, he had his contract extended by Bath. He signed with Cardiff Rugby on loan for the 2025-26 season. Immanuel rejoined Cardiff on a season-long loan in September 2026. He was recalled form the loan the following month with Bath having suffered injuries to their front row players.

== International career ==
He has represented the Wales national under-20 rugby union team and was in the Wales U20 squad for both the 2024 and 2025 World Rugby U20 Championship.

== Personal life ==
His brother Steffan Emanuel is also a professional rugby union player.
