= 2011–12 RFU Championship =

- Countries: England
- Champions: London Welsh
- Runners-up: Cornish Pirates
- Relegated: Esher
- Matches played: 174
- Attendance: 342,849 (average 1,970 per match)
- Top point scorer: (England) Rob Cook (Cornish Pirates) 310 pts
- Top try scorer: (England) Josh Bassett (Bedford Blues) 17 tries

The 2011–12 RFU Championship was the third season (of the professionalised format) of the second tier of the English domestic rugby union competition, played between August 2011 and May 2012. New teams to the division included Leeds Carnegie who were relegated from the Aviva Premiership 2010–11 and London Scottish who were promoted from 2010–11 National League 1. The first stage was won by Bristol and the final by London Welsh who, after an appeal, won promotion to the Aviva Premiership 2012–13. Esher were relegated to the 2012–13 National League 1.

On 8 May 2012 it was announced that only Bristol was eligible for promotion under the RFU's minimum standards criteria. They were subsequently beaten by the Cornish Pirates in the semi–finals who in turn lost to the eventual champions, London Welsh. London Welsh had announced on 14 May that they would meet the RFU's eligibility test to play in the Premiership if they should win promotion and two days later announced they would play at the Kassam Stadium in Oxford if successful. On 23 May, the day of the first leg of the final, the RFU announced that London Welsh would not be eligible for promotion due to "various failures". The appeal by London Welsh was heard by an Independent Panel on 29 June who upheld it stating ″... that the Exiles should be promoted on the basis that they play their home games at Oxford's Kassam Stadium and that the club meet the minimum entry criteria to the league as imposed by the Professional Game Board.″ Chief Executive Officer of the RFU, Ian Richie, subsequently announced that there would be a full review of the Minimum Standard Criteria.

== Participating teams ==
Locations of the 2011–12 RFU Championship teams

This season saw Leeds Carnegie back in the Championship following relegation from the Aviva Premiership during the 2010–11 season, as well as London Scottish, who won promotion to the Championship from the National League 1 during the same season.

Team	Stadium	Capacity	City/Area
Bedford Blues	Goldington Road	5,000 (1,700 seats)	Bedford, Bedfordshire
Bristol	Memorial Stadium	12,100	Bristol
Cornish Pirates	Mennaye Field	4,000 (2,200 Seats)	Penzance, Cornwall
Doncaster Knights	Castle Park	3,075	Doncaster, South Yorkshire
Esher	Molesey Road	3,000	Hersham, Surrey
Leeds Carnegie	Headingley Rugby Stadium	20,250	Leeds, West Yorkshire
London Scottish	Athletic Ground, Richmond	4,500 (1,000 seats)	Richmond, London
London Welsh	Old Deer Park	5,850 (1,000 seats)	Richmond, London
Moseley	Billesley Common	3,000	Birmingham, West Midlands
Nottingham	Meadow Lane	19,588	Nottingham, Nottinghamshire
Plymouth Albion	The Brickfields	8,500	Plymouth, Devon
Rotherham Titans	Clifton Lane	2,500	Rotherham, South Yorkshire

== Stage one ==
=== League table ===
2011–12 RFU Championship table
Pos	Team	Pld	W	D	L	PF	PA	PD	B	Pts	Qualification
1	Bristol	22	17	0	5	615	386	+229	13	81	Promotion playoffs
2	Bedford Blues	22	14	1	7	640	476	+164	16	74	Promotion playoffs
3	Cornish Pirates	22	14	3	5	606	464	+142	12	74	Promotion playoffs
4	London Welsh (C)	22	13	2	7	528	432	+96	11	67	Promotion playoffs
5	Nottingham	22	12	2	8	599	465	+134	10	62	Promotion playoffs
6	Leeds Carnegie	22	13	1	8	470	505	−35	6	60	Promotion playoffs
7	Rotherham Titans	22	11	1	10	469	431	+38	11	57	Promotion playoffs
8	Doncaster Knights	22	9	2	11	467	524	−57	10	50	Promotion playoffs
9	London Scottish	22	6	0	16	422	543	−121	10	34	Relegation playoffs
10	Moseley	22	6	1	15	445	634	−189	7	33	Relegation playoffs
11	Plymouth Albion	22	6	0	16	362	528	−166	6	30	Relegation playoffs
12	Esher (R)	22	4	1	17	376	611	−235	5	23	Relegation playoffs

Rules for classification: If teams are level at any stage, tiebreakers are applied in the following order:
1. Number of matches won
2. Difference between points for and against
3. Total number of points for
4. Aggregate number of points scored in matches between tied teams
5. Number of matches won excluding the first match, then the second and so on until the tie is settled
  (C) Champion; (R) Relegated

=== League results ===
The Home Team is listed on the left column.

Clubs	BED	BRI	PIR	DON	ESH	LEE	SCO	WEL	MOS	NOT	PLY	ROT
Bedford Blues		15-17	32-13	18-18	41-13	28-45	43-10	22-18	37-24	40-26	29-17	24-23
Bristol	26-6		37-33	52-26	27-7	33-19	32-13	35-33	48-13	18-16	39-22	37-3
Cornish Pirates	24-34	18-17		39-32	34-18	52-10	42-10	27-6	32-17	26-24	33-12	30-13
Doncaster Knights	33-12	12-38	36-21		41-24	9-9	37-28	10-21	29-21	15-32	12-3	14-15
Esher	6-55	6-20	30-36	20-29		15-20	24-14	3-37	14-29	22-34	41-17	24-12
Leeds Carnegie	21-17	12-11	14-13	16-30	22-24		19-17	13-26	22-21	22-19	28-23	25-19
London Scottish	15-41	6-20	23-25	20-25	32-17	16-23		22-29	37-21	6-21	21-17	16-11
London Welsh	25-24	23-17	17-17	37-24	13-13	29-39	18-16		7-10	34-23	34-23	25-33
Moseley	15-24	33-27	27-27	17-15	35-21	32-42	16-29	16-41		10-20	9-3	8-36
Nottingham	26-28	24-35	25-25	40-14	29-20	24-11	33-21	26-10	62-20		34-10	30-30
Plymouth Albion	21-38	3-23	16-20	18-6	22-11	25-20	29-25	9-24	21-20	19-21		24-20
Rotherham Titans	40-32	44-6	14-19	23-10	12-3	22-18	0-15	20-21	40-31	19-11	20-8

Home Win	Draw	Away Win

=== Round 1 ===
3 September 2011
14:00

Doncaster Knights	13 - 38	Bristol (BP)
	Report

Castle Park
Attendance: 1,098
Referee: Ian Tempest

3 September 2011
14:00

(BP) Moseley	27 - 27	Cornish Pirates
	Report

Billesley
Attendance: 806
Referee: Terry Hall

3 September 2011
14:00

Plymouth Albion	22 - 11	Esher
	Report

Brickfields
Attendance: 1,330
Referee: Ross Campbell

4 September 2011
14:00

Leeds Carnegie	13 - 26	London Welsh
	Report

Headingley
Attendance: 2,343
Referee: Darren Gamage

4 September 2011
14:00

London Scottish	16 - 11	Rotherham Titans (BP)
	Report

Richmond Athletic Ground
Attendance: 1,375
Referee: Matt Carley

4 September 2011
14:00

(BP) Nottingham	26 - 28	Bedford Blues
	Report

Meadow Lane
Attendance: 1,733
Referee: Sean Davey

=== Round 2 ===
10 September 2011
14:00

Esher	6 - 55	Bedford Blues (BP)
	Report

Molesey Road
Attendance: 986
Referee: Paul Knowles

10 September 2011
14:00

(BP) London Welsh	34 - 23	Plymouth Albion
	Report

Old Deer Park
Attendance: 798
Referee: Martin Fox

10 September 2011
14:00

Moseley	10 - 20	Nottingham
	Report

Billesley
Attendance: 738
Referee: Ross Campbell

11 September 2011
14:00

(BP) Bristol	32 - 13	London Scottish
	Report

Memorial Stadium
Attendance: 4,670
Referee: Llyr Apgeraint

11 September 2011
14:00

(BP) Cornish Pirates	39 - 32	Doncaster Knights (2BP)
	Report

Mennaye Field
Attendance: 1,990
Referee: Steve Lee

11 September 2011
14:00

Rotherham Titans	22 - 18	Leeds Carnegie (BP)
	Report

Clifton Lane
Attendance: 1,750
Referee: Steve Lee

=== Round 3 ===
16 September 2011
18:45

Nottingham	29 - 20	Esher
	Report

Meadow Lane
Attendance: 1,105
Referee: Chris White

16 September 2011
18:45

Plymouth Albion	24 - 20	Rotherham Titans (BP)
	Report

Brickfields
Attendance: 1,675
Referee: Terry Hall

17 September 2011
13:00

(BP) London Scottish	23 - 25	Cornish Pirates (BP)
	Report

Richmond Athletic Ground
Attendance: 1,187
Referee: Andrew

17 September 2011
13:30

(BP) Doncaster Knights	29 - 21	Moseley
	Report

Castle Park
Attendance: 707
Referee: Steve Lee

17 September 2011
14:00

Bedford Blues	22 - 18	London Welsh (BP)
	Report

Goldington Road
Attendance: 2,703
Referee: Michael Tutty

18 September 2011
12:00

Leeds Carnegie	12 - 11	Bristol (BP)
	Report

Headingley Stadium
Attendance: 2,599
Referee: Sean Davey

=== Round 4 ===
24 September 2011
14:00

(BP) Doncaster Knights	37 - 28	London Scottish
	Report

Castle Park
Attendance: 752
Referee: Michael Tutty

24 September 2011
14:00

(BP) London Welsh	34 - 23	Nottingham
	Report

Old Deer Park
Attendance: 830
Referee: Terry Hall

24 September 2011
14:00

(BP) Moseley	35 - 21	Esher
	Report

Billesley
Attendance: 682
Referee: Llyr Apgeraint

24 September 2011
14:00

(BP) Rotherham Titans	40 - 32	Bedford Blues (BP)
	Report

Clifton Lane
Attendance: 1,487
Referee: Andrew

24 September 2011
15:15

(BP) Cornish Pirates	52 - 10	Leeds Carnegie
	Report

Mennaye Field
Attendance: 2,007
Referee: Luke Pearce

25 September 2011
14:00

(BP) Bristol	39 - 22	Plymouth Albion
	Report

Memorial Stadium
Attendance: 4,054
Referee: Steve Lee

=== Round 5 ===
30 September 2011
18:45

Esher	3 - 37	London Welsh (BP)
	Report

Molesey Road
Attendance: 1,216
Referee: Luke Pearce

30 September 2011
18:45

Nottingham	30 - 30	Rotherham Titans
	Report

Meadow Lane
Attendance: 1,038
Referee: Darren Gamage

1 October 2011
14:00

(BP) Bedford Blues	15 - 17	Bristol
	Report

Goldington Road
Attendance: 2,831
Referee: Michael Tutty

1 October 2011
14:00

(BP) Plymouth Albion	16 - 20	Cornish Pirates
	Report

Brickfields
Attendance: 2,850
Referee: Matt Carley

2 October 2011
13:00

(BP) London Scottish	37 - 21	Moseley
	Report

Richmond Athletic Ground
Attendance: 740
Referee: Ross Campbell

2 October 2011
14:00

Leeds Carnegie	16 - 30	Doncaster Knights (BP)
	Report

Headingley Stadium
Attendance: 2,368
Referee: Andrew Taylorson

=== Round 6 ===
7 October 2011
18:45

Bristol	18 - 15	Nottingham (BP)
	Report

Memorial Stadium
Attendance: 4,023
Referee: Andrew

8 October 2011
13:30

Doncaster Knights	12 - 3	Plymouth Albion
	Report

Castle Park
Attendance: 859
Referee: Ross Campbell

8 October 2011
14:00

(BP) London Scottish	16 - 23	Leeds Carnegie
	Report

Richmond Athletic Ground
Attendance: 1,285
Referee: Matt Carley

8 October 2011
14:00

Moseley	16 - 41	London Welsh (BP)
	Report

Billesley
Attendance: 767
Referee: Llyr Apgeraint

8 October 2011
14:00

Rotherham Titans	12 - 3	Esher
	Report

Clifton Lane
Attendance: 861
Referee: Ian Tempest

9 October 2011
14:00

Cornish Pirates	24 -34	Bedford Blues (BP)
	Report

Mennaye Field
Attendance: 2,092
Referee: Terry Hall

=== Round 7 ===
14 October 2011
18:45

Nottingham	25 - 25	Cornish Pirates
	Report

Meadow Lane
Attendance: 1,363
Referee: Steve Lee

15 October 2011
13:30

Esher	6 - 20	Bristol
	Report

Molesey Road
Attendance: 832
Referee: Darren Gamage

15 October 2011
14:00

(BP) London Welsh	25 - 33	Rotherham Titans (BP)
	Report

Old Deer Park
Attendance: 1,072
Referee: Andrew Taylorson

15 October 2011
14:00

Plymouth Albion	29 - 25	London Scottish (BP)
	Report

Brickfields
Attendance: 1,455
Referee: Terry Hall

15 October 2011
14:00

Bedford Blues	18 - 18	Doncaster Knights
	Report

Goldington Road
Attendance: 3,573
Referee: Martin Fox

16 October 2011
14:00

Leeds Carnegie	22 - 21	Moseley (BP)
	Report

Headingley Stadium
Attendance: 1,724
Referee: Michael Tutty

=== Round 8 ===
21 October 2011
18:45

(BP) Bristol	35 - 33	London Welsh (2BP)
	Report

Memorial Stadium
Attendance: 6,046
Referee: JP Doyle

22 October 2011
13:30

Doncaster Knights	15 - 32	Nottingham
	Report

Castle Park
Attendance: 1,071
Referee: Ian Tempest

22 October 2011
14:00

London Scottish	15 - 41	Bedford Blues (BP)
	Report

Richmond Athletic Ground
Attendance: 1,381
Referee: Steve Lee

22 October 2011
14:00

Moseley	8 - 36	Rotherham Titans (BP)
	Report

Billesley
Attendance: 915
Referee: J Matthews

23 October 2011
14:00

(BP) Cornish Pirates	34 - 18	Esher
	Report

Mennaye Field
Attendance: 1,965
Referee: Michael Tutty

23 October 2011
14:00

Leeds Carnegie	28 - 23	Plymouth Albion (BP)
	Report

Headingley Stadium
Attendance: 1,805
Referee: Darren Gamage

=== Round 9 ===
28 October 2011
18:45

Plymouth Albion	21 - 20	Moseley (BP)
	Report

Brickfields
Attendance: 1,725
Referee: Michael Tutty

29 October 2011
14:00

(BP) Bedford Blues	28 - 45	Leeds Carnegie (BP)
	Report

Goldington Road
Attendance: 2,763
Referee: Ross Campbell

29 October 2011
14:00

Esher	20 - 29	Doncaster Knights (BP)
	Report

Molesey Road
Attendance: 1,019
Referee: Dean Richards

29 October 2011
14:00

London Welsh	17 - 17	Cornish Pirates
	Report

Old Deer Park
Attendance: 1,749
Referee: Cedric Marchat

29 October 2011
14:00

(BP) Rotherham Titans	44 - 6	Bristol
	Report

Clifton Lane
Attendance: 2,007
Referee: Terry Hall

30 October 2011
14:00

(BP) Nottingham	33 - 31	London Scottish (BP)
	Report

Meadow Lane
Attendance: 1,636
Referee: Darren Gamage

=== Round 10 ===
5 November 2011
14:30

Doncaster Knights	10 - 21	London Welsh
	Report

Castle Park
Attendance: 1,042
Referee: Ross Campbell

5 November 2011
15:00

(BP) London Scottish	32 - 17	Esher
	Report

Richmond Athletic Ground
Attendance: 1,413
Referee: Llyr Apgeraint

5 November 2011
15:00

Moseley	33 - 27	Bristol (BP)
	Report

Billesley
Attendance: 897
Referee: Matt Carley

5 November 2011
15:00

Plymouth Albion	21 - 38	Bedford Blues (BP)
	Report

Goldington Road
Attendance: 1,455
Referee: Paul Knowles

6 November 2011
14:15

(BP) Cornish Pirates	30 - 13	Rotherham Titans
	Report

Mennaye Field
Attendance: 2,506
Referee: Darren Gamage

6 November 2011
15:00

Leeds Carnegie	22 - 19	Nottingham (BP)
	Report

Headingley Stadium
Attendance: 2,083
Referee: Terry Hall

=== Round 11 ===
18 November 2011
19:45

(BP) Nottingham	34 - 10	Plymouth Albion
	Report

Meadow Lane
Attendance: 1,078
Referee: Steve Lee

19 November 2011
14:00

Rotherham Titans	23 - 10	Doncaster Knights
	Report

Clifton Lane
Attendance: 2,467
Referee: Dean Richards

19 November 2011
14:30

London Welsh	18 - 16	London Scottish (BP)
	Report

Old Deer Park
Attendance: 2,290
Referee: Matt Carley

19 November 2011
15:00

(BP) Bedford Blues	37 - 24	Moseley
	Report

Goldington Road
Attendance: 2,429
Referee: Michael Tutty

19 November 2011
15:00

(BP) Esher	15 - 20	Leeds Carnegie
	Report

Molesey Road
Attendance: 844
Referee: Cemmy Rudkin

20 November 2011
15:00

(BP) Bristol	37 - 33	Cornish Pirates (2BP)
	Report

Memorial Stadium
Attendance: 6,044
Referee: David Rose

=== Round 12 ===
25 November 2011
20:00

Leeds Carnegie	25 - 19	Rotherham Titans (BP)
	Report

Headingley Stadium
Attendance: 3,167
Referee: Ian Tempest

26 November 2011
15:00

(BP) Bedford Blues	41 - 13	Esher
	Report

Goldington Road
Attendance: 2,104
Referee: Andrew

26 November 2011
15:00

Doncaster Knights	36 - 21	Cornish Pirates
	Report

Castle Park
Attendance: 1,188
Referee: Llyr Apgeraint

26 November 2011
15:00

Plymouth Albion	9 - 24	London Welsh (BP)
	Report

Brickfields
Attendance: 1,853
Referee: Terry Hall

27 November 2011
15:00

London Scottish	6 - 20	Bristol
	Report

Richmond Athletic Ground
Attendance: 1,333
Referee: Michael Tutty

27 November 2011
15:00

(BP) Nottingham	62 - 20	Moseley
	Report

Meadow Lane
Attendance: 1,371
Referee: Dean Richards

=== Round 13 ===
2 December 2011
19:45

(BP) Esher	22 - 34	Nottingham (BP)
	Report

Molesey Road
Attendance: 766
Referee: Llyr Apgeraint

3 December 2011
15:00

Rotherham Titans	20 - 8	Plymouth Albion
	Report

Clifton Lane
Attendance: 1,437
Referee: Paul Knowles

3 December 2011
15:00

Moseley	17 - 15	Doncaster Knights (BP)
	Report

Billesley
Attendance: 757
Referee: Darren Gamage

3 December 2011
15:00

London Welsh	25 - 24	Bedford Blues (BP)
	Report

Old Deer Park
Attendance: 1,078
Referee: Tim Wigglesworth

4 December 2011
15:00

Bristol	33 - 19	Leeds Carnegie
	Report

Memorial Stadium
Attendance: 6,107
Referee: Matt Carley

4 December 2011
15:00

(BP) Cornish Pirates	42 - 10	London Scottish
	Report

Mennaye Field
Attendance: 2,168

=== Round 14 ===
9 December 2011
19:45

Nottingham	26 - 10	London Welsh
	Report

Meadow Lane
Attendance: 1,187
Referee: Ross Campbell

10 December 2011
15:00

Bedford Blues	24 - 23	Rotherham Titans (BP)
	Report

Goldington Road
Attendance: 1,964
Referee: Matt Carley

10 December 2011
15:00

Esher	14 - 29	Moseley (BP)
	Report

Molesey Road
Attendance: 789
Referee: Steve Lee

10 December 2011
15:00

(BP) London Scottish	20 - 25	Doncaster Knights
	Report

Richmond Athletic Ground
Attendance: 892
Referee: Paul Knowles

10 December 2011
15:00

Plymouth Albion	3 - 23	Bristol
	Report

Brickfields
Attendance: 2,011
Referee: Geraint Roberts

11 December 2011
15:00

Leeds Carnegie	14 - 13	Cornish Pirates (BP)
	Report

Headingley Stadium
Attendance: 2,568
Referee: Dean Richards

=== Round 15 ===
23 December 2011
18:00

Bristol	26 - 6	Bedford Blues
	Report

Memorial Stadium
Attendance: 8,607
Referee: Martin Fox

24 December 2011
14:00

(BP) Cornish Pirates	33 - 12	Plymouth Albion
	Report

Mennaye Field
Attendance: 3,214
Referee: Luke Pearce

24 December 2011
14:00

Rotherham Titans	19 - 11	Nottingham
	Report

Clifton Lane
Attendance: 1,881
Referee: Tim Wigglesworth

26 December 2011
14:00

London Welsh	13 - 13	Esher
	Report

Old Deer Park
Attendance: 1,150
Referee: Paul Knowles

26 December 2011
15:30

Doncaster Knights	9 - 9	Leeds Carnegie
	Report

Castle Park
Attendance: 2,107
Referee: Darren Gamage

26 December 2011
16:00

Moseley	16 - 29	London Scottish
	Report

Billesley
Attendance: 905
Referee: Alan Campbell

=== Round 16 ===
30 December 2011
19:45

Nottingham	24 - 35	Bristol (BP)
	Report

Meadow Lane
Attendance: 2,102
Referee: Ian Tempest

30 December 2011
19:45

Plymouth Albion	18 - 6	Doncaster Knights
	Report

Brickfields
Attendance: 1,801
Referee: Matt Carley

31 December 2011
14:00

(BP) London Welsh	7 - 10	Moseley
	Report

Old Deer Park
Attendance: 908

31 December 2011
15:00

Esher	24 - 12	Rotherham Titans
	Report

Molesey Road
Attendance: 1,066

1 January 2012
15:00

(BP) Bedford Blues	32 - 13	Cornish Pirates
	Report

Goldington Road
Attendance: 4,396
Referee: Steve Lee

1 January 2012
19:45

Leeds Carnegie	19 - 17	London Scottish (BP)
	Report

Headingley Stadium
Attendance: 2,306
Referee: Michael Tutty

=== Round 17 ===
7 January 2012
14:00

(BP) Rotherham Titans	20 - 21	London Welsh
	Report

Clifton Lane
Attendance: 1,362
Referee: Michael Tutty

7 January 2012
14:30

(BP) Doncaster Knights	33 - 12	Bedford Blues
	Report

Castle Park
Attendance: 1,201
Referee: Terry Hall

7 January 2012
15:00

London Scottish	21 - 17	Plymouth Albion (BP)
	Report

Richmond Athletic Ground
Attendance: 1,189
Referee: Dean Richards

7 January 2012
15:00

(BP) Moseley	32 - 42	Leeds Carnegie (BP)
	Report

Billesley
Attendance: 775
Referee: Sean Davey

8 January 2012
14:00

Bristol	27 - 7	Esher
	Report

Memorial Stadium
Attendance: 4,608

8 January 2012
14:00

Cornish Pirates	26 - 24	Nottingham (BP)
	Report

Mennaye Field
Attendance: 2,026
Referee: Ross Campbell

=== Round 18 ===
14 January 2012
13:00

(BP) Rotherham Titans	40 - 31	Moseley (BP)
	Report

Clifton Lane
Attendance: 1,236
Referee: Steve Lee

14 January 2012
14:00

London Welsh	23 - 17	Bristol (BP)
	Report

Old Deer Park
Attendance: 2,100
Referee: Dean Richards

14 January 2012
15:00

(BP) Bedford Blues	43 - 10	London Scottish
	Report

Goldington Road
Attendance: 2,553
Referee: Darren Gamage

14 January 2012
15:00

(2BP) Esher	30 - 36	Cornish Pirates (BP)
	Report

Molesey Road
Attendance: 1,216
Referee: Michael Tutty

14 January 2012
15:00

(BP) Plymouth Albion	25 - 20	Leeds Carnegie (BP)
	Report

Brickfields
Attendance: 1,732
Referee: Paul Knowles

14 January 2012

Nottingham	P – P	Doncaster Knights

- Postponed. Game rescheduled to 15 February 2012.

=== Round 19 ===
27 January 2012
19:00

Moseley	9 - 3	Plymouth Albion (BP)
	Report

Billesley
Attendance: 879
Referee: Michael Tutty

28 January 2012
15:00

(BP) Doncaster Knights	41 - 24	Esher
	Report

Castle Park
Attendance: 1,273
Referee: Steve Lee

29 January 2012
14:00

Cornish Pirates	27 - 6	London Welsh
	Report

Mennaye Field
Attendance: 1,802
Referee: JP Doyle

29 January 2012
14:00

London Scottish	6 - 21	Nottingham
	Report

Richmond Athletic Ground
Attendance: 1,105
Referee: Matt Carley

29 January 2012
15:00

Leeds Carnegie	21 - 17	Bedford Blues (BP)
	Report

Headingley Stadium
Attendance: 2,514
Referee: David Pearson

29 January 2012
15:00

(BP) Bristol	37 - 3	Rotherham Titans
	Report

Memorial Ground
Attendance: 4,822
Referee: Darren Gamage

=== Round 20 ===
11 February 2012
15:00

(BP) Bedford Blues	29 - 17	Plymouth Albion
	Report

Goldington Road
Attendance: 1,407
Referee: Greg MacDonald

11 February 2012
15:00

Esher	24 - 14	London Scottish
	Report

Molesey Road
Attendance: 743
Referee: Steve Lee

11 February 2012

London Welsh	P - P	Doncaster Knights

- Postponed. Game rescheduled to 22 February 2012.

11 February 2012

Nottingham	P - P	Leeds Carnegie

- Postponed. Game rescheduled to 22 February 2012.

12 February 2012
14:00

(BP) Bristol	48 - 13	Moseley
	Report

Memorial Ground
Attendance: 4,322
Referee: Ross Campbell

13 February 2012
14:00

(BP) Rotherham Titans	14 - 19	Cornish Pirates
	Report

Clifton Lane
Attendance: 465
Referee: Michael Tutty

=== Round 18 (Rescheduled Game) ===
15 February 2012
19:45

(BP) Nottingham	40 - 14	Doncaster Knights
	Report

Meadow Lane
Attendance: 837
Referee: Paul Knowles

=== Round 21 ===
18 February 2012
12:05

(BP) Doncaster Knights	14 - 15	Rotherham Titans
	Report

Castle Park
Attendance: 4,021
Referee: Steve Lee

18 February 2012
15:00

Moseley	15 - 24	Bedford Blues (BP)
	Report

Billesley
Attendance: 879
Referee: Llyr Apgeraint

18 February 2012
15:00

(BP) Plymouth Albion	19 - 21	Nottingham
	Report

Brickfields
Attendance: 1,496
Referee: Darren Gamage

19 February 2012
14:00

Cornish Pirates	18 - 17	Bristol (BP)
	Report

Mennaye Field
Attendance: 3,115
Referee: Dave Ward

19 February 2012
14:00

(BP) London Scottish	22 - 29	London Welsh (BP)
	Report

Richmond Athletic Ground
Attendance: 2,103
Referee: Dean Richards

19 February 2012
15:00

(BP) Leeds Carnegie	22 - 24	Esher
	Report

Headingley Stadium
Attendance: 1,983
Referee: Grey MacDonald

=== Round 20 (Rescheduled Games) ===
22 February 2012
14:00

(BP) London Welsh	37 - 14	Doncaster Knights
	Report

Old Deer Park
Attendance: 365

22 February 2012
15:00

Nottingham	24 - 11	Leeds Carnegie
	Report

Meadow Lane
Attendance: 487
Referee: Steve Lee

=== Round 22 ===
24 February 2012
19:45

(BP) Bristol	52 - 26	Doncaster Knights
	Report

Memorial Stadium
Attendance: 4,631
Referee: Michael Tutty

25 February 2012
13:00

London Welsh	29 - 39	Leeds Carnegie (BP)
	Report

Old Deer Park
Attendance: 4,400
Referee: Martin Fox

25 February 2012
14:00

(BP) Bedford Blues	40 - 26	Nottingham (BP)
	Report

Goldington Road
Attendance: 2,336
Referee: Steve Lee

25 February 2012
14:00

(BP) Cornish Pirates	32 - 17	Moseley
	Report

Mennaye Field
Attendance: 1,844

25 February 2012
14:00

(BP) Esher	41 - 17	Plymouth Albion
	Report

Molesey Road
Attendance: 1,066
Referee: Terry Hall

25 February 2012
14:00

Rotherham Titans	0 - 15	London Scottish
	Report

Clifton Lane
Attendance: 935
Referee: Ross Campbell

=== Attendances ===
A total of 251,542 people watched the 132 stage one matches to give an average of 1,903 per match. The highest attendance was 8,067 on Sunday, 8 January 2012 at the match between Bristol and Bedford Blues which Bristol won 26–6.

Club	Home Games	Total	Average	Highest	Lowest	% Capacity
Bedford Blues	11	29,049	2,640	4,396	1,407	44%
Bristol	11	57,394	5,217	8,067	4,023	43%
Cornish Pirates	11	24,729	2,248	3,214	1,802	56%
Doncaster Knights	11	15,314	1,392	4,021	707	45%
Esher	11	10,590	962	1,263	743	32%
Leeds Carnegie	11	25,460	2,314	3,167	1,724	11%
London Scottish	11	14,003	1,273	2,103	740	28%
London Welsh	11	16,740	1,521	4,400	365	26%
Moseley	11	9,085	825	995	682	28%
Nottingham	11	13,930	1,266	2,102	487	6%
Plymouth Albion	11	19,374	1,761	2,850	1,330	21%
Rotherham Titans	11	15,874	1,443	2,467	463	58%

== Stage two Play–offs ==
=== Group A (promotion) ===
Pos	Team	P	W	D	L	F	A	+/–	BP	PTS	Adj
1	Bristol	6	4	2	0	185	83	102	2	25	3
2	London Welsh	6	4	1	1	171	127	44	3	23	2
3	Nottingham	6	2	1	3	152	118	34	2	13	1
4	Doncaster Knights	6	0	0	6	66	246	–180	1	1	0

=== Round 1 ===
9 March 2012
19:45

Doncaster Knights	3 - 65	Bristol (BP)
	Report

Castle Park
Attendance: 1,113
Referee: Ross Campbell

10 March 2012
12:30

(BP) London Welsh	32 - 21	Nottingham
	Report

Old Deer Park
Attendance: 654
Referee: Llyr Apgeraint

=== Round 2 ===
18 March 2012
15:00

Bristol	12 - 12	London Welsh
	Report

Memorial Ground
Attendance: 4,721
Referee: Dean Richards

18 March 2012
15:00

Nottingham	30 - 3	Doncaster Knights
	Report

Meadow Lane
Attendance: 1,079
Referee: Steve Lee

=== Round 3 ===
24 March 2012
14:30

London Welsh	34 - 24	Doncaster Knights (BP)
	Report

Old Deer Park
Attendance: 1,048
Referee: Matt Carley

25 March 2012
15:00

(BP) Nottingham	19 - 24	Bristol
	Report

Meadow Lane
Attendance: 1,511

=== Round 4 ===
30 March 2012
19:45

Bristol	19 - 19	Nottingham
	Report

Memorial Stadium
Attendance: 7,021
Referee: Llyr Apgeraint

31 March 2012
14:30

Doncaster Knights	19 - 40	London Welsh (BP)
	Report

Castle Park
Attendance: 898
Referee: Steve Lee

=== Round 5 ===
14 April 2012
13:00

Doncaster Knights	7 - 38	Nottingham (BP)
	Report

Castle Park
Attendance: 974
Referee: Ross Campbell

15 April 2012
14:15

(BP) London Welsh	20 - 26	Bristol
	Report

Old Deer Park
Attendance: 1,725
Referee: David Rose

=== Round 6 ===
21 April 2012
14:00

(BP) Bristol	39 - 10	Doncaster Knights
	Report

Memorial Stadium
Attendance: 5,102
Referee: Ian Tempest

21 April 2012
14:00

Nottingham	25 - 33	London Welsh
	Report

Meadow Lane
Attendance: 1,471
Referee: Greg MacDonald

=== Group A Attendances ===
Club	Home Games	Total	Average	Highest	Lowest	% Capacity
Bristol	3	16,754	5,584	7,021	4,721	46%
London Welsh	3	4,359	1,453	1,725	1,048	25%
Nottingham	3	4,061	1,353	1,511	1,079	7%
Doncaster Knights	3	2,985	995	1,113	898	32%

=== Group B (promotion) ===
Pos	Team	P	W	D	L	F	A	+/–	BP	PTS	Adj
1	Bedford Blues	6	4	1	1	155	109	46	3	24	3
2	Cornish Pirates	6	3	1	2	127	133	–6	2	18	2
3	Leeds Carnegie	6	2	2	2	124	127	–3	2	15	1
4	Rotherham Titans	6	1	0	5	88	125	–37	2	6	0

=== Round 1 ===
10 March 2012
14:00

Rotherham Titans	19 - 32	Bedford Blues (BP)
	Report

Clifton Lane
Attendance: 1,586
Referee: Tim Wigglesworth

10 March 2012
14:30

Cornish Pirates	14 - 14	Leeds Carnegie
	Report

Mennaye Field
Attendance: 1,953
Referee: Paul Knowles

=== Round 2 ===
16 March 2012
19:45

Bedford Blues	26 - 25	Cornish Pirates (BP)
	Report

Goldington Road
Attendance: 3,377
Referee: Michael Tutty

18 March 2012
12:15

Leeds Carnegie	3 - 20	Rotherham Titans
	Report

Headingley Stadium
Attendance: 1,057
Referee: Llyr Apgeraint

=== Round 3 ===
25 March 2012
15:00

Cornish Pirates	25 - 17	Rotherham Titans
	Report

Mennaye Field
Attendance: 1,923
Referee: Darren Gamage

25 March 2012
15:00

Leeds Carnegie	24 - 24	Bedford Blues
	Report

Headingley Stadium
Attendance: 1,782
Referee: David Pearson

=== Round 4 ===
31 March 2012
14:00

(BP) Rotherham Titans	14 - 17	Cornish Pirates
	Report

Clifton Lane
Attendance: 1,222
Referee: Tim Wigglesworth

31 March 2012
15:00

Bedford Blues	26 - 20	Leeds Carnegie (BP)
	Report

Goldington Road
Attendance: 2,977
Referee: Matthew Carley

=== Round 5 ===
14 April 2012
14:00

(BP) Rotherham Titans	18 - 21	Leeds Carnegie
	Report

Clifton Lane
Attendance: 1,062
Referee: Steve Lee

15 April 2012
14:00

Cornish Pirates	21 - 20	Bedford Blues (BP)
	Report

Mennaye Field
Attendance: 2,139
Referee: Luke Pearce

=== Round 6 ===
21 April 2012
14:00

(BP) Bedford Blues	27 - 0	Rotherham Titans
	Report

Goldington Road
Attendance: 2,942
Referee: Darren Gamage

21 April 2012
14:00

(BP) Leeds Carnegie	42 - 25	Cornish Pirates
	Report

Headingley Stadium
Attendance: 1,588
Referee: Ross Campbell

=== Group B Attendances ===
Club	Home Games	Total	Average	Highest	Lowest	% Capacity
Bedford Blues	3	9,296	3,098	3,377	2,942	52%
Cornish Pirates	3	6,015	2,005	2,319	1,923	50%
Leeds Carnegie	3	4,427	1,475	1,782	1,057	7%
Rotherham Titans	3	3,870	1,290	1,586	1,062	52%

=== Group C (relegation) ===
Pos	Team	P	W	D	L	F	A	+/–	BP	PTS	Adj
1	Moseley	6	4	0	2	147	142	5	3	25	6
2	Plymouth Albion	6	4	0	2	152	115	37	2	24	6
3	London Scottish	6	2	0	4	102	139	–37	4	18	6
4	Esher (R)	6	2	0	4	128	133	–5	4	16	4

=== Round 1 ===
9 March 2012
19:30

Moseley	25 - 17	Plymouth Albion
	Report

Billesley
Attendance: 783
Referee: Matt Carley

10 March 2012
15:00

(BP) Esher	16 - 20	London Scottish
	Report

Molesey Road
Attendance: 1,267
Referee: Wayne Barnes

=== Round 2 ===
16 March 2012
19:45

Plymouth Albion	18 - 11	Esher (BP)
	Report

Brickfields
Attendance: 1,433

18 March 2012
14:00

London Scottish	23 - 20	Moseley (BP)
	Report

Richmond Athletic Ground
Attendance: 915
Referee: Paul Knowles

=== Round 3 ===
23 March 2012
19:45

(BP) Plymouth Albion	35 - 7	London Scottish
	Report

Brickfields
Attendance: 1,564

24 March 2012
14:00

Moseley	27 - 15	Esher
	Report

Billesley
Attendance: 1,117
Referee: Ross Campbell

=== Round 4 ===
31 March 2012
15:00

Esher	13 - 25	Moseley
	Report

Molesey Road
Attendance: 1,418
Referee: Darren Gamage

1 April 2012
13:00

(BP) London Scottish	6 - 11	Plymouth Albion
	Report

Richmond Athletic Ground
Attendance: 1,122
Referee: Ian Tempest

=== Round 5 ===
14 April 2012
14:00

(BP) Esher	42 - 17	Plymouth Albion
	Report

Molesey Road
Attendance: 1,121
Referee: Matt Carley

14 April 2012
14:00

(BP) Moseley	26 - 20	London Scottish (BP)
	Report

Billesley
Attendance: 1,349
Referee: Darren Gamage

=== Round 6 ===
21 April 2012
14:00

(2BP) London Scottish	26 - 31	Esher (BP)
	Report

Richmond Athletic Ground
Attendance: 2,027
Referee: Luke Pearce

21 April 2012
14:00

(BP) Plymouth Albion	54 - 24	Moseley (BP)
	Report

Brickfields
Attendance: 1,728
Referee: John Meredith

=== Group C Attendances ===
Club	Home Games	Total	Average	Highest	Lowest	% Capacity
Plymouth Albion	3	4,725	1,575	1,728	1,433	19%
London Scottish	3	3,964	1,321	2,027	815	29%
Esher	3	3,806	1,268	1,418	1,121	42%
Moseley	3	3,249	1,083	1,349	783	36%

- (Adj) Refers to adjustment for the number of points awarded before the start of the play-offs.

== Stage three ==
Going into the final stage, only one of the four semi–finalists Bristol, reportedly met the RFU's standards for promotion to the Premiership. According to some reports, London Welsh were also pursuing promotion, and announced on 14 May they would attempt a legal challenge to the Premiership's entry criteria if they won the play–offs. The Cornish Pirates could not meet the criteria due to deficiencies at their home ground at the Mennaye Field.

=== Semi–finals ===
4 May 2012
19:45

Bedford Blues (England)	3 – 13	(England) London Welsh
Pen: Pritchard 63' (1)	Report	Try: Tongaʻuiha 22'c Con: Davies (1/1); Pen: Davies 27', 40' (2)

Goldington Road, Bedford
Attendance: 4,075
Referee: Sean Davey (England)

FB	15	(Canada) James Pritchard (c)
RW	14	(England) Ollie Dodge
OC	13	(Ireland) Brendan Burke
IC	12	(England) Henry Staff
LW	11	(England) Josh Bassett
FH	10	(England) Jake Sharp
SH	9	(England) Luke Baldwin
N8	8	(England) Donald Barrell
OF	7	(England) Darren Fox
BF	6	(England) Alex Rae
RL	5	(England) Mike Howard
LL	4	(Samoa) Paul Tupai
TP	3	(England) Ben Cooper
HK	2	(England) Chris Locke
LP	1	(England) Ricky Reeves
Replacements:
HK	16	(Scotland) Neil Cochrane
PR	17	(England) Sam Walsh
PR	18	(England) Phil Boulton
N8	19	(England) Jon Fisher
FL	20	(England) Sacha Harding
SH	21	(South Africa) Darryl Veenendaal
FH	22	(England) Jamie Lennard
	Coach: (Wales) Mike Rayer

FB	15	(England) Alex Davies
RW	14	(Nigeria) Joe Ajuwa
OC	13	(Wales) James Lewis
IC	12	(Tonga) Hudson Tongaʻuiha
LW	11	(England) Nick Scott
FH	10	(Scotland) Gordon Ross
SH	9	(Wales) Jack Moates
N8	8	(England) Ed Jackson
OF	7	(England) Mike Denbee
BF	6	(Wales) Jonathan Mills (c)
RL	5	(England) Matt Corker
LL	4	(Wales) Adam Brown
TP	3	(England) James Tideswell
HK	2	(Wales) Dan George
LP	1	(England) Billy Moss
Replacements:
HK	16	(Tonga) Viliami Ma'asi
PR	17	(United States) Shawn Pittman
PR	18	(England) Greg Bateman
LK	19	(England) Gary Johnson
FL	20	(England) Lee Beach
SH	21	(Wales) Robert Lewis
CE	22	(England) Seb Jewell
Coach: (Wales) Lyn Jones

Touch judges:
(England) Barry Dalby
(England) Martin Buck

7 May 2012
12:05

Cornish Pirates (England)	45 – 24	(England) Bristol
Try: Cook 48'c, Rimmer 58'c, 76'm, Doherty 66'c, Pointer 72'c Con: Cook (4/5); Pen: Cook 15', 22', 26', 52' (4)	Report	Try: Merriman 6'c, Helu 10'c, 55'c Con: Jones (3/3); Pen: Jones 20' (1)

Mennaye Field, Penzance
Attendance: 2,983
Referee: JP Doyle (England)

FB	15	(England) Rob Cook
RW	14	(England) Grant Pointer
OC	13	(United States) Andrew Suniula
IC	12	(England) Sam Hill
LW	11	(England) David Doherty
FH	10	(Wales) Ceiron Thomas
SH	9	(Wales) Gavin Cattle (c)
N8	8	(England) Ben Maidment
OF	7	(England) Phil Burgess
BF	6	(England) Chris Morgan
RL	5	(Scotland) Ian Nimmo
LL	4	(New Zealand) Laurie McGlone
TP	3	(England) Alan Paver
HK	2	(England) Dave Ward
LP	1	(England) Carl Rimmer
Replacements:
PR	16	(England) Ryan Storer
HK	17	(Germany) Rob Elloway
PR	18	(South Africa) Rudi Brits
FL	19	(Zimbabwe) Dave Ewers
N8	20	(England) Kyle Marriott
SH	21	(England) Tom Kessell
WG	22	(Canada) Matt Evans
	Coach: (Wales) Ian Davies

FB	15	(England) Jon Goodridge
RW	14	(Ireland) Jack Tovey
OC	13	(Samoa) Fautua Otto
IC	12	(England) Luke Eves
LW	11	(Tonga) William Helu
FH	10	(Wales) Matthew Jones
SH	9	(New Zealand) Ruki Tipuna
N8	8	(Australia) Dan Montagu
OF	7	(Wales) James Merriman
BF	6	(England) Iain Grieve (c)
RL	5	(England) Roy Winters
LL	4	(England) Glen Townson
TP	3	(England) Jason Hobson
HK	2	(Ireland) Jason Harris-Wright
LP	1	(England) Mark Irish
Replacements:
HK	16	(England) Tom Channon
PR	17	(England) Mark Lilley
PR	18	(England) Wayne Thompson
LK	19	(England) Ben Glynn
FL	20	(Australia) Henry Vanderglas
FH	21	(England) Tom Slater
FB	22	(New Zealand) Matty James
Coach: (Zimbabwe) Liam Middleton

Man of the Match:
(Wales) Gavin Cattle

Touch judges:
(England) James Minards
(England) Richard Parker-Sedgemore
Television Match Official:
(England) Geoff Warren

13 May 2012
12:45

Bristol (England)	29 – 18	(England) Cornish Pirates
Try: Goodridge 6'c, 53'c, Watkins 70'm, Helu 77'c Con: Roberts (2/3), James (1/1); Pen: Roberts 41' (1)	Report	Try: Cook 27'c, Burgess 65'm Con: Cook (1/1), Thomas (0/1); Pen: Cook 4', 79' (2)

Memorial Stadium, Bristol
Attendance: 7,356
Referee: Sean Davey (England)

FB	15	(England) Jon Goodridge
RW	14	(Tonga) William Helu
OC	13	(Samoa) Fautua Otto
IC	12	(England) Luke Eves
LW	11	(Scotland) George Watkins
FH	10	(England) Tristan Roberts
SH	9	(New Zealand) Ruki Tipuna
N8	8	(England) Iain Grieve (c)
OF	7	(Wales) James Merriman
BF	6	(England) Josh Ovens
RL	5	(England) Roy Winters
LL	4	(Argentina) Mariano Sambucetti
TP	3	(England) Jason Hobson
HK	2	(Ireland) Jason Harris-Wright
LP	1	(England) Mark Irish
Replacements:
HK	16	(Wales) Ross Johnstone
PR	17	(England) Mark Lilley
PR	18	(England) Wayne Thompson
LK	19	(England) Ben Glynn
FL	20	(Australia) Henry Vanderglas
SH	21	(England) Tom Slater
FH	22	(New Zealand) Matty James
	Coach: (Zimbabwe) Liam Middleton

FB	15	(England) Rob Cook
RW	14	(England) Grant Pointer
OC	13	(United States) Andrew Suniula
IC	12	(England) Sam Hill
LW	11	(England) David Doherty
FH	10	(Wales) Ceiron Thomas
SH	9	(Wales) Gavin Cattle (c)
N8	8	(England) Kyle Marriott
OF	7	(England) Phil Burgess
BF	6	(England) Chris Morgan
RL	5	(Scotland) Ian Nimmo
LL	4	(New Zealand) Laurie McGlone
TP	3	(England) Alan Paver
HK	2	(England) Dave Ward
LP	1	(England) Carl Rimmer
Replacements:
PR	16	(England) Ryan Storer
HK	17	(Germany) Rob Elloway
PR	18	(South Africa) Rudi Brits
LK	19	(England) Matt Smith
FL	20	(Zimbabwe) Dave Ewers
WG	21	(Canada) Matt Evans
SH	22	(England) Tom Kessell
Coach: (Wales) Ian Davies

Man of the Match:
(England) Phil Burgess
Touch judges:
(England) Roger Baileff
(England) Chris Sharp
Television Match Official:
(England) Steve Savage

- Cornish Pirates progressed to the Championship final, winning on aggregate 63–53.

13 May 2012
15:00

London Welsh (England)	17 – 24	(England) Bedford Blues
Try: Scott 48'm Con: Davies (0/1); Pen: Davies 3', 19', 24', 54' (4)		Try: Dodge 40'c, Barrell 73'c, Cochrane 80'c Con: Pritchard (3/3); Pen: Pritchard 42' (1)

Old Deer Park, London
Attendance: 3010
Referee: Llyr Apgeraint-Roberts (England)

FB	15	(England) Alex Davies
RW	14	(Nigeria) Joe Ajuwa
OC	13	(Wales) James Lewis
IC	12	(Tonga) Hudson Tongaʻuiha
LW	11	(England) Nick Scott
FH	10	(Scotland) Gordon Ross
SH	9	(Wales) Robert Lewis
N8	8	(England) Ed Jackson
OF	7	(England) Mike Denbee
BF	6	(Wales) Jonathan Mills (c)
RL	5	(England) Matt Corker
LL	4	(Wales) Adam Brown
TP	3	(England) James Tideswell
HK	2	(Wales) Dan George
LP	1	(England) Max Lahiff
Replacements:
PR	16	(England) Billy Moss
PR	17	(England) Greg Bateman
LK	18	(England) Gary Johnson
FL	19	(England) Lee Beach
SH	20	(Wales) Jack Moates
FH	21	(England) Seb Jewell
WG	22	(England) Ashley Smith
Coach:
(Wales) Lyn Jones

FB	15	(Canada) James Pritchard (c)
RW	14	(England) Ollie Dodge
OC	13	(Ireland) Brendan Burke
IC	12	(England) Henry Staff
LW	11	(England) Josh Bassett
FH	10	(England) Jamie Lennard
SH	9	(England) Luke Baldwin
N8	8	(England) Jon Fisher
OF	7	(England) Sacha Harding
BF	6	(England) Gregor Gillanders
RL	5	(England) Mike Howard
LL	4	(Samoa) Paul Tupai
TP	3	(England) Phil Boulton
HK	2	(Scotland) Neil Cochrane
LP	1	(England) Ricky Reeves
Replacements:
HK	16	(England) Chris Locke
PR	17	(England) Sam Walsh
LK	18	(England) Alex Rae
N8	19	(England) Donald Barrell
FL	20	(England) Darren Fox
SH	21	(South Africa) Darryl Veenendaal
CE	22	(England) Ian Vass
Coach:
(Wales) Mike Rayer

Touch judges:
(England) Darryl Chapman
(England) Steve Leyshon

- London Welsh progressed to the Championship final, winning on aggregate 30–27.

=== Final ===
23 May 2012
19:45

Cornish Pirates (England)	21 – 37	(England) London Welsh

Mennaye Field, Penzance
Attendance: 3,205
Referee: Greg Garner (England)

FB	15	(England) Rob Cook
RW	14	(England) Grant Pointer
OC	13	(United States) Andrew Suniula
IC	12	(England) Sam Hill
LW	11	(England) David Doherty
FH	10	(Wales) Ceiron Thomas
SH	9	(Wales) Gavin Cattle (c)
N8	8	(England) Kyle Marriott
OF	7	(England) Phil Burgess
BF	6	(Zimbabwe) Dave Ewers
RL	5	(Scotland) Ian Nimmo
LL	4	(New Zealand) Laurie McGlone
TP	3	(England) Alan Paver
HK	2	(England) Dave Ward
LP	1	(England) Carl Rimmer
Replacements:
PR	16	(England) Ryan Storer
HK	17	(Germany) Rob Elloway
PR	18	(South Africa) Rudi Brits
LK	19	(England) Matt Smith
N8	20	(England) Ben Maidment
SH	21	(England) Tom Kessell
WG	22	(Canada) Matt Evans
	Coach: (Wales) Ian Davies

FB	15	(England) Alex Davies
RW	14	(Nigeria) Joe Ajuwa
OC	13	(Wales) James Lewis
IC	12	(Tonga) Hudson Tongaʻuiha
LW	11	(England) Nick Scott
FH	10	(Scotland) Gordon Ross
SH	9	(Wales) Jack Moates
N8	8	(England) Ed Jackson
OF	7	(England) Mike Denbee
BF	6	(Wales) Jonathan Mills (c)
RL	5	(England) Matt Corker
LL	4	(Wales) Adam Brown
TP	3	(England) James Tideswell
HK	2	(Wales) Dan George
LP	1	(England) Billy Moss
Replacements:
HK	16	(Tonga) Viliami Ma'asi
PR	17	(United States) Shawn Pittman
PR	18	(England) Greg Bateman
LK	19	(England) Gary Johnson
FL	20	(England) Lee Beach
SH	21	(Wales) Robert Lewis
FH	22	(England) Seb Jewell
Coach: (Wales) Lyn Jones

Touch judges:
(England) Luke Pearce
(England) Chris Sharp
Television Match Official:
(England) TBC

30 May 2012
19:45

London Welsh (England)	29 – 20	(England) Cornish Pirates

Kassam Stadium, Oxford
Attendance: 3,456

- London Welsh win 66–41 on aggregate.

== Total season attendances ==
- Includes playoff games.

Club	Home Games	Total	Average	Highest	Lowest	% Capacity
Bedford Blues	15	42,420	2,828	4,396	1,407	57%
Bristol	15	81,504	5,434	8,067	4,023	45%
Cornish Pirates	16	36,932	2,308	3,214	1,802	58%
Doncaster Knights	14	18,299	1,307	4,021	707	40%
Esher	14	14,396	1,028	1,418	743	34%
Leeds Carnegie	14	29,887	2,135	3,167	1,057	11%
London Scottish	14	17,967	1,283	2,103	740	29%
London Welsh	16	27,565	1,723	4,400	365	26%
Moseley	14	12,334	881	1,349	682	29%
Nottingham	14	17,991	1,285	2,102	487	7%
Plymouth Albion	14	24,099	1,721	2,850	1,330	20%
Rotherham Titans	14	19,744	1,410	2,467	463	56%

== Individual statistics ==
- Player stats include playoff games as well as regular season games. Also note that points scorers includes tries as well as conversions, penalties and drop goals. Statistics come from Stages 1, 2 and 3 of the Championship season.

=== Top points scorers ===
Rank	Player	Team	Appearances	Points
1	(England) Rob Cook	Cornish Pirates	30	310
2	(Scotland) Garry Law	Rotherham Titans	23	255
3	(England) James Love	Plymouth Albion	27	250
3	(England) Alex Davies	London Welsh	28	250
4	(England) Tommy Bell	Leeds Carnegie	20	232
5	(Canada) James Pritchard	Bedford Blues	21	218
6	(England) Daniel Mugford	London Scottish	19	215
7	(Japan) James Arlidge	Nottingham	20	213
8	(England) Tristan Roberts	Bristol	18	204
9	(England) Ollie Thomas	Moseley	20	162

=== Top try scorers ===
Rank	Player	Team	Appearances	Tries
1	(England) Josh Bassett	Bedford Blues	23	17
2	(England) David Doherty	Cornish Pirates	23	14
3	(Ireland) Robin Copeland	Rotherham Titans	26	13
4	(Canada) Phil Mackenzie	Esher	18	12
4	(Scotland) George Watkins	Bristol	21	12
4	(Tonga) Hudson Tongaʻuiha	London Welsh	27	12
4	(England) Ed Jackson	London Welsh	29	12
5	(Ireland) Shane Monahan	Rotherham Titans	26	11
6	(Tonga) William Helu	Bristol	14	10
6	(Samoa) Fautua Otto	Bristol	19	10
6	(Canada) James Pritchard	Bedford Blues	21	10
6	(England) Jack Tovey	Bristol	25	10
6	(Argentina) Juan Pablo Socino	Nottingham	28	10

=== RFU Dream Team XV ===
The RFU Dream Team is picked by the coaches of the twelve championship teams with Robin Copeland (Rotherham Titans) voted in by seven of the twelve teams. The Cornish Pirates and Bristol both have four players in the team, whilst Gavin Cattle and Dave Ward (both Cornish Pirates) are in the team for the third season in a row. Mark Irish, James Merriman (both Bristol), Juan Pablo Socino (Nottingham) and Rob Cook (Cornish Pirates) are in the team for a second season.

- 15 Rob Cook (Cornish Pirates)
- 14 Jack Tovey (Bristol)
- 13 Ian Thornley (Leeds Carnegie)
- 12 Juan Pablo Socino (Nottingham)
- 11 Josh Bassett (Bedford Blues)
- 10 Garry Law (Rotherham Titans)
- 9 Gavin Cattle (Cornish Pirates)
- 1 Mark Irish (Bristol)
- 2 Dave Ward (Cornish Pirates)
- 3 Aaron Liffchak (London Scottish)
- 4 Roy Winters (Bristol)
- 5 Ian Nimmo (Cornish Pirates)
- 6 Robin Copeland (Rotherham Titans)
- 7 James Merriman (Bristol)
- 8 Semisi Taulava (Rotherham Titans)

== Season records ==
=== Team ===
Largest home win — 42 pts

62 - 20 Nottingham at home to Moseley on 27 November 2011

Largest away win — 62 pts

65 - 3 Bristol away to Doncaster Knights on 9 March 2012

Most points scored — 65 pts

65 - 3 Bristol away to Doncaster Knights on 9 March 2012

Most tries in a match — 8 (x4)

Bedford Blues away to Esher on 10 September 2011
Nottingham at home to Moseley on 27 November 2011
Bristol away to Doncaster Knights on 9 March 2012
Plymouth Albion at home to Moseley on 21 April 2012

Most conversions in a match — 8

Nottingham at home to Moseley on 27 November 2011

Most penalties in a match — 7 (x2)

Bristol at home to Leeds Carnegie on 4 December 2011
Leeds Carnegie at home to Bedford Blues on 29 January 2012

Most drop goals in a match — 3

Leeds Carnegie at home to Rotherham Titans on 25 November 2011

=== Player ===
Most points in a match — 27

(Japan) James Arlidge for Nottingham at home to Moseley on 27 November 2011

Most tries in a match — 3 (x4)

(Australia) Bradley Hunt for Moseley away to Nottingham on 27 November 2011
(England) Joshua Bassett for Bedford Blues at home to London Scottish on 14 January 2012
(England) George Watkins for Bristol at home to Doncaster Knights on 24 February 2012
(England) Nicholas Scott for London Welsh away to Doncaster Knights on 31 March 2012

Most conversions in a match — 8

(Japan) James Arlidge for Nottingham at home to Moseley on 27 November 2011

Most penalties in a match — 7 (x2)

(England) Tristan Roberts for Bristol at home to Leeds Carnegie on 4 December 2011
(England) Thomas Bell for Leeds Carnegie at home to Bedford Blues on 29 January 2012

Most drop goals in a match — 3

(England) Joe Ford for Leeds Carnegie at home to Rotherham Titans on 25 November 2011

=== Attendances ===
Highest — 12,024

Worcester Warriors at home to Cornish Pirates on 18 May 2011

Lowest — 317

Birmingham & Solihull at home to Doncaster Knights on 9 January 2011

Highest Average Attendance — 6,524

Worcester Warriors

Lowest Average Attendance — 590

Birmingham & Solihull

== See also ==
- 2011–12 British and Irish Cup
- 2011–12 Cornish Pirates RFC season
