= List of 2014–15 Premiership Rugby transfers =

This is a list of player transfers involving Aviva Premiership teams before or during the 2014–15 season.

== Bath ==
=== Players In ===
- (England) Henry Thomas from (England) Sale Sharks
- (England) Nick Auterac from (England) Saracens
- (England) Sam Burgess from (Australia) South Sydney Rabbitohs
- (England) Luke Arscott from (England) Exeter Chiefs
- (Scotland) Grant Shiells from (England) Newcastle Falcons
- (England) Will Spencer promoted from Academy

=== Players Out ===
- (Samoa) Anthony Perenise to (England) Bristol Rugby
- (England) Nick Abendanon to (France) Clermont Auvergne
- (South Africa) Nick Köster to (England) Bristol Rugby
- (England) Charlie Beech to (England) Yorkshire Carnegie
- (England) Tom Biggs to (England) Worcester Warriors
- (Ireland) Ryan Caldwell to (England) Exeter Chiefs
- (Scotland) Tom Heathcote to (Scotland) Edinburgh Rugby
- (Wales) Martin Roberts to (Wales) Ospreys
- (Argentina) Eusebio Guiñazú to (Ireland) Munster
- (England) Josh Ovens to (England) Bristol Rugby
- (England) Mat Gilbert to (England) Worcester Warriors

== Exeter Chiefs ==
=== Players In ===
- (England) Thomas Waldrom from (England) Leicester Tigers
- (Scotland) Moray Low from (Scotland) Glasgow Warriors
- (England) Tomas Francis from (England) London Scottish
- (Australia) Mitch Lees from (England) London Welsh
- (Tonga) Elvis Taione from (England) Jersey
- (Ireland) Ryan Caldwell from (England) Bath Rugby
- (Wales) Adam Hughes from (England) Bristol Rugby
- (Namibia) Chrysander Botha from (South Africa) Lions

=== Players Out ===
- (New Zealand) Hoani Tui to (France) Lyon
- (Wales) Craig Mitchell to (Wales) Cardiff Blues
- (New Zealand) Romana Graham to (France) La Rochelle
- (New Zealand) Jason Shoemark to (New Zealand) Hawke's Bay Magpies
- (England) Chris Whitehead retired
- (England) Tom Cowan-Dickie to (England) Plymouth Albion
- (England) James Hanks retired
- (England) Lloyd Fairbrother to (Wales) Newport Gwent Dragons
- (England) Luke Arscott to (England) Bath Rugby
- (England) James Phillips to (England) London Scottish

== Gloucester ==
=== Players In ===
- (New Zealand) John Afoa from (Ireland) Ulster
- (Wales) Richard Hibbard from (Wales) Ospreys
- (Argentina) Mariano Galarza from (England) Worcester Warriors
- (Scotland) Greig Laidlaw from (Scotland) Edinburgh Rugby
- (Wales) Aled Thomas from (Wales) Scarlets
- (England) Mark Atkinson from (England) Bedford Blues
- (Wales) Tom Isaacs from (Wales) Ospreys
- (Scotland) Steve McColl from (England) Yorkshire Carnegie
- (England) Tom Palmer from (England) Wasps
- (England) Jacob Rowan from (England) Yorkshire Carnegie
- (Wales) James Hook from (France) USA Perpignan
- (England) Callum Braley from (England) Bristol Rugby
- (England) Henry Purdy from (England) Leicester Tigers
- (England) Elliott Stooke promoted from Academy
- (England) Billy Burns promoted from Academy
- (England) Ross Moriarty promoted from Academy
- (Tonga) Aleki Lutui from (Scotland) Edinburgh Rugby

=== Players Out ===
- (Wales) Will James retired
- (England) Matt Cox to (England) Worcester Warriors
- (England) Ryan Mills to (England) Worcester Warriors
- (England) Andy Hazell retired
- (Wales) Tavis Knoyle to (Wales) Cardiff Blues
- (England) Tim Taylor retired
- (Wales) Dan George to (England) Worcester Warriors
- (England) Tom Heard to (England) Plymouth Albion
- (Wales) Thomas Young to (England) Wasps
- (England) Freddie Burns to (England) Leicester Tigers
- (Australia) Huia Edmonds to (France) RC Narbonne
- (New Zealand) Jonny Bentley to (England) Jersey
- (England) Rupert Harden to (Italy) Benetton Treviso
- (England) Koree Britton to (England) London Welsh
- (England) Drew Cheshire to (England) Moseley
- (New Zealand) Jimmy Cowan to (New Zealand) Tasman Makos
- (England) Mike Tindall retired
- (Scotland) Andrew Bulumakau to (England) Doncaster Knights
- (Tonga) Lua Lokotui to (France) Béziers
- (England) James Simpson-Daniel retired
- (Wales) Martyn Thomas to (France) RC Massy

== Harlequins ==
=== Players In ===
- (England) Jack Clifford promoted from Academy
- (England) George Merrick promoted from Academy
- (England) Sam Stuart promoted from Academy
- (England) Sam Twomey promoted from Academy
- (England) Charlie Walker promoted from Academy
- (England) Marland Yarde from (England) London Irish
- (Fiji) Asaeli Tikoirotuma from (New Zealand) Chiefs

=== Players Out ===
- (England) Tom Guest to (England) London Irish
- (England) Sam Smith to (England) Worcester Warriors
- (Samoa) Maurie Fa'asavalu to (France) Oyonnax
- (England) Nick Kennedy retired
- (New Zealand) Tim Molenaar to (England) London Welsh
- (New Zealand) Nic Mayhew to (New Zealand) North Harbour
- (England) Paul Sackey retired

== Leicester Tigers ==
=== Players In ===
- (England) Freddie Burns from (England) Gloucester Rugby
- (England) Laurence Pearce from (England) Rotherham Titans
- (Japan) Christian Loamanu from (Italy) Benetton Treviso
- (Italy) Leonardo Ghiraldini from (Italy) Benetton Treviso
- (Italy) Robert Barbieri from (Italy) Benetton Treviso
- (Fiji) Seremaia Bai from (France) Castres Olympique
- (Italy) Michele Rizzo from (Italy) Benetton Treviso
- (Samoa) Aniseko Sio unattached
- (Italy) Riccardo Brugnara promoted from Academy
- (Italy) Tiziano Pasquali promoted from Academy
- (New Zealand) Javiah Pohe promoted from Academy
- (England) Tom Price promoted from Academy
- (England) Harry Thacker promoted from Academy
- (New Zealand) Brad Thorn from (New Zealand) Highlanders
- (Wales) Jack Roberts from (England) Rotherham Titans

=== Players Out ===
- (England) Thomas Waldrom to (England) Exeter Chiefs
- (England) Boris Stankovich to (Wales) Newport Gwent Dragons
- (England) Ryan Lamb to (England) Worcester Warriors
- (England) Toby Flood to (France) Toulouse
- (Scotland) Scott Steele to (England) London Irish
- (England) George Chuter retired
- (England) Rob Hawkins to (England) Newcastle Falcons
- (England) Harry Wells to (England) Bedford Blues
- (England) Ryan Bower to (England) Worcester Warriors
- (England) Joe Cain retired
- (France) Jérôme Schuster to (France) Tarbes
- (England) Pasqualle Dunn released
- (New Zealand) Daniel Bowden to (New Zealand) Blues
- (England) Henry Purdy to (England) Gloucester Rugby
- (France) Lucas Guillaume to (France) Aix-en-Provence
- (Ireland) Michael Noone to (England) Jersey
- (Tonga) Steve Mafi to (Australia) Western Force
- (England) Harry Rudkin to (England) Doncaster

== London Irish ==
=== Players In ===
- (Ireland) Tom Court from (Ireland) Ulster
- (England) Tom Guest from (England) Harlequins
- (Ireland) Eoin Griffin from (Ireland) Connacht
- (England) Luke Narraway from (France) USA Perpignan
- (England) James Short from (England) Saracens
- (Scotland) Geoff Cross from (Scotland) Edinburgh Rugby
- (England) Sean Cox from (Scotland) Edinburgh Rugby
- (Samoa) Daniel Leo from (France) USA Perpignan
- (Scotland) Scott Steele from (England) Leicester Tigers
- (Ireland) Conor Gilsenan from (Ireland) Leinster
- (New Zealand) Chris Noakes from (New Zealand) Blues

=== Players Out ===
- (England) Marland Yarde to (England) Harlequins
- (Australia) James O'Connor to (France) Toulon
- (England) Declan Danaher retired
- (Wales) Ian Gough to (Wales) Newport Gwent Dragons
- (Ireland) Ian Humphreys to (Ireland) Ulster
- (South Africa) CJ van der Linde to (South Africa) Eastern Province Kings
- (Samoa) Setaimata Sa to (England) Hull F.C.
- (New Zealand) Bryn Evans to (France) Biarritz Olympique
- (Tonga) Chris Hala'ufia to (Wales) Scarlets
- (England) Ed Hoadley to (England) London Welsh
- (Samoa) Sailosi Tagicakibau to (England) Wasps
- (England) Charlie Davey to (England) Cornish Pirates
- (England) Jon Fisher to (England) Northampton Saints

== London Welsh ==
=== Players In ===
- (England) Olly Barkley from (Wales) Scarlets
- (England) Tristan Roberts from (England) Bristol Rugby
- (Wales) Nic Reynolds from (Wales) Scarlets
- (England) Chris Elder from (England) Plymouth Albion
- (Tonga) Taione Vea from (England) Wasps
- (England) Ricky Reeves from (England) Wasps
- (Ireland) Shane Cahill from (England) Cornish Pirates
- (England) Jack Gilding from (Italy) Viadana
- (England) Jimmy Litchfield from (England) Hartpury College R.F.C.
- (England) Nathan Taylor from (England) Hartpury College R.F.C.
- (Ireland) James Sandford from (England) Cornish Pirates
- (Ireland) Paul Rowley from (England) Plymouth Albion
- (England) Jesse Liston from (England) Blackheath
- (England) Josh McNally from (England) Henley Hawks
- (England) Koree Britton from (England) Gloucester Rugby
- (New Zealand) Tim Molenaar from (England) Harlequins
- (Wales) Darren Waters from (Wales) Newport Gwent Dragons
- (England) Dean Schofield from (England) Worcester Warriors
- (Australia) Lachlan McCaffrey from (Australia) Brumbies
- (Argentina) Pablo Henn from (France) Limoges
- (New Zealand) Piri Weepu from (New Zealand) Blues
- (Tonga) Eddie Aholelei from (Australia) Melbourne Rebels
- (England) Ed Hoadley from (England) London Irish
- (Wales) James Down from (Wales) Cardiff Blues
- (England) Ben Cooper from (England) Bedford Blues

=== Players Out ===
- (England) Andy Titterrell retired
- (Australia) Mitch Lees to (England) Exeter Chiefs
- (England) Billy Moss (England) Bedford Blues
- (England) Peter Edwards to (Wales) Scarlets
- (England) Kevin Davis to (England) Ealing Trailfinders
- (United States) Tai Tuisamoa to (England) London Scottish
- (Wales) Cai Griffiths to (Wales) Ospreys
- (England) James Tideswell to (England) Yorkshire Carnegie
- (Wales) Sonny Parker retired
- (England) Alec Hepburn to (Australia) Perth Spirit
- (England) Mike Denbee to (England) East Grinstead RFC
- (England) Ollie Frost to (England) East Grinstead RFC
- (United States) John Quill to (Ireland) Dolphin RFC
- (Nigeria) Joe Ajuwa released
- (South Africa) Rob Andrew released
- (United States) Toby L'Estrange released
- (Scotland) Ian Nimmo released
- (Tonga) Hudson Tongaʻuiha released

== Newcastle Falcons ==
=== Players In ===
- (Argentina) Juan Pablo Socino from (England) Rotherham Titans
- (New Zealand) Ruki Tipuna from (England) Bristol Rugby
- (England) Calum Green from (England) Yorkshire Carnegie
- (England) Rob Hawkins from (England) Leicester Tigers
- (United States) Eric Fry from (England) London Scottish
- (Samoa) Alesana Tuilagi from (Japan) NTT Communications Shining Arcs
- (Samoa) Anitelea Tuilagi from (Wales) Newport Gwent Dragons
- (Italy) Joshua Furno from (France) Biarritz Olympique
- (Tonga) Uili Koloʻofai from (France) US Colomiers
- (Samoa) Kane Thompson from (New Zealand) Chiefs

=== Players Out ===
- (England) Chris Pilgrim to (England) Yorkshire Carnegie
- (England) James Fitzpatrick to (England) Yorkshire Carnegie
- (Scotland) Michael Tait to (Scotland) Edinburgh Rugby
- (France) Franck Montanella to (France) Biarritz Olympique
- (England) Alex Crockett retired
- (England) Joel Hodgson to (England) Northampton Saints
- (Scotland) Grant Shiells to (England) Bath Rugby
- (Scotland) Fraser McKenzie to (Scotland) Edinburgh Rugby
- (England) Harry Spencer to (France) AS Mâcon

== Northampton Saints ==
=== Players In ===
- (England) Alex Day promoted from Academy
- (England) Joel Hodgson from (England) Newcastle Falcons
- (England) Jon Fisher from (England) London Irish

=== Players Out ===
- (Russia) Vasily Artemyev to (Russia) Krasny Yar Krasnoyarsk
- (South Africa) Gerrit-Jan van Velze to (England) Worcester Warriors
- (England) Danny Herriott to (England) Jersey
- (England) Ryan Glynn to (England) Jersey
- (England) Paul Diggin retired
- (England) Sam Harry released
- (Samoa) Fa'atoina Autagavaia to (France) USO Nevers
- (England) Ross McMillan to (England) Bristol Rugby

== Sale Sharks ==
=== Players In ===
- (Scotland) Nathan Hines from (France) Clermont Auvergne
- (Scotland) Chris Cusiter from (Scotland) Glasgow Warriors
- (Italy) Alberto De Marchi from (Italy) Benetton Treviso
- (England) Darren Fearn from (England) Bedford Blues
- (Italy) Luke McLean from (Italy) Benetton Treviso
- (England) Magnus Lund from (France) Biarritz Olympique
- (Georgia (country)) Shalva Mamukashvili from (Georgia (country)) RC Army Tbilisi
- (England) Josh Beaumont promoted from Academy
- (England) James Flynn promoted from Academy
- (England) Nathan Fowles promoted from Academy
- (England) Sam James promoted from Academy
- (Ireland) Charlie Ignall promoted from Academy
- (England) Mike Haley promoted from Academy

=== Players Out ===
- (England) Henry Thomas to (England) Bath Rugby
- (Wales) Dwayne Peel to (England) Bristol Rugby
- (England) James Gaskell to (England) Wasps
- (England) Rob Miller to (England) Wasps
- (England) Tom Holmes to (England) Rotherham Titans
- (Russia) Kirill Kulemin to (France) USA Perpignan
- (Ireland) Tony Buckley retired

== Saracens ==
=== Players In ===
- (Scotland) Jim Hamilton from (France) Montpellier
- (Argentina) Juan Figallo from (France) Montpellier
- Mike Ellery from England Sevens
- (Australia) Kieran Longbottom from (Australia) Western Force
- (Romania) Cătălin Fercu from (Romania) RC Timişoara

=== Players Out ===
- (England) Steve Borthwick retired
- (England) Nick Auterac to (England) Bath Rugby
- (England) Matt Stevens to (South Africa) Sharks
- (England) Max Crumpton to (England) Bristol Rugby
- (England) James Short to (England) London Irish
- (South Africa) Nick Fenton-Wells to (England) Bedford Blues
- (England) Tom Jubb to (England) Plymouth Albion
- (England) Joel Tomkins to (England) Wigan Warriors
- (Fiji) Michael Tagicakibau to (Wales) Scarlets
- (Ireland) Eoin Sheriff to (England) Bedford Blues (season-loan)
- (England) Mouritz Botha to (South Africa) Sharks
- (New Zealand) Jack Wilson to (South Africa) Sharks

== Wasps ==
=== Players In ===
- (Wales) Bradley Davies from (Wales) Cardiff Blues
- (England) James Gaskell from (England) Sale Sharks
- (England) Rob Miller from (England) Sale Sharks
- (Italy) Lorenzo Cittadini from (Italy) Benetton Treviso
- (Scotland) Ruaridh Jackson from (Scotland) Glasgow Warriors
- (Samoa) Alapati Leiua from (New Zealand) Hurricanes
- (Wales) Ed Shervington from (England) Worcester Warriors
- (England) Buster Lawrence from (England) Moseley
- (Wales) Thomas Young from (England) Gloucester Rugby
- (England) Alex Lozowski from (England) Yorkshire Carnegie
- (England) Will Rowlands promoted from Academy
- (Wales) John Yapp from (Scotland) Edinburgh Rugby
- (Samoa) Sailosi Tagicakibau from (England) London Irish

=== Players Out ===
- (Scotland) Neil Cochrane to (Scotland) Edinburgh Rugby
- (Scotland) Hugo Southwell retired
- (England) Tom Palmer to (England) Gloucester Rugby
- (Argentina) Esteban Lozada retired
- (England) Liam O'Neill to (England) Nottingham
- (England) Tommy Bell to (England) Jersey
- (Wales) Rory Pitman to (Wales) Scarlets
- (England) Ricky Reeves to (England) London Welsh
- (Tonga) Taione Vea to (England) London Welsh
- (England) Joe Carlisle to (Italy) Benetton Treviso
- Charlie Hayter to England Sevens
- (United States) Andrew Suniula to (United States) Old Blue

== See also ==
- List of 2014–15 RFU Championship transfers
- List of 2014–15 Pro12 transfers
- List of 2014–15 Top 14 transfers
- List of 2014–15 Super Rugby transfers
