= List of 2013–14 Premiership Rugby transfers =

This is a list of transfers involving Premiership teams before or during the 2013-14 season. The Premiership is an English rugby union league.

== Bath ==
=== Players in ===
- (Argentina) Juan Pablo Orlandi from (France) Racing Metro
- (Australia) Leroy Houston from (France) US Colomiers
- (England) Jonathan Joseph from (England) London Irish
- (England) David Sisi from (England) London Irish
- (England) Anthony Watson from (England) London Irish
- (England) Matt Garvey from (England) London Irish
- (Wales) Martin Roberts from (England) Northampton Saints
- (England) George Ford from (England) Leicester Tigers
- (England) Micky Young from (England) Leicester Tigers
- (Ireland) Peter Stringer from (Ireland) Munster
- (Wales) Gavin Henson from (England) London Welsh
- (Samoa) Alafoti Fa'osiliva from (England) Bristol Rugby

=== Players out ===
- (England) Lee Mears retired
- (England) Ben Skirving to (England) Bristol Rugby
- (New Zealand) Stephen Donald to (Japan) Mitsubishi Sagamihara DynaBoars
- (Scotland) Jack Cuthbert to (Scotland) Edinburgh Rugby
- (England) Dan Hipkiss retired
- (Scotland) Simon Taylor released
- (Scotland) Mark McMillan released
- (England) Sam Vesty released
- (England) Ben Mosses to (England) Bristol Rugby
- (South Africa) Michael Claassens to (France) Toulon

== Exeter Chiefs ==
=== Players in ===
- (Wales) Ceri Sweeney from (Wales) Cardiff Blues
- (England) Dave Lewis from (England) Gloucester Rugby
- (Wales) Tom James from (Wales) Cardiff Blues
- (England) Greg Bateman from (England) London Welsh
- (Tonga) Fetuʻu Vainikolo from (Ireland) Connacht
- (South Africa) Don Armand from (South Africa) Stormers
- (New Zealand) Romana Graham from (New Zealand) Chiefs

=== Players out ===
- (England) Chris Budgen retired
- (England) Simon Alcott retired
- (England) Neil Clark to (France) Oyonnax
- (England) Aly Muldowney to (Ireland) Connacht
- (England) Richard Baxter retired
- (England) Kevin Barrett retired
- (Samoa) Junior Poluleuligaga to (New Zealand) Auckland
- (Australia) Myles Dorrian to (England) London Irish
- (Argentina) Ignacio Mieres to (England) Worcester Warriors
- (Samoa) Josh Tatupu to (France) US Carcassonne
- (Argentina) Gonzalo Camacho to (England) Leicester Tigers
- (England) Mark Foster to (England) Jersey
- (France) Nic Sestaret released
- (Fiji) Watisoni Votu to (France) USA Perpignan

== Gloucester ==
=== Players in ===
- (England) Matt Kvesic from (England) Worcester Warriors
- (England) James Hudson from (England) Newcastle Falcons
- (Wales) Tavis Knoyle from (Wales) Scarlets
- (New Zealand) Jonny Bentley from (England) Cornish Pirates
- (Wales) Dan George from (England) London Welsh

=== Players out ===
- (Scotland) Jim Hamilton to (France) Montpellier
- (England) Alex Brown retired
- (England) Peter Buxton retired
- (England) Will Graulich to (England) Cornish Pirates
- (England) Dave Lewis to (England) Exeter Chiefs
- (Italy) Dario Chistolini to (Italy) Zebre
- (England) Drew Locke to (England) Jersey
- (Italy) Tommaso D'Apice to (Italy) Zebre

== Harlequins ==
=== Players in ===
- (England) Paul Doran-Jones from (England) Northampton Saints
- (England) Nick Kennedy from (France) Toulon
- (England) Paul Sackey from (France) Stade Français Paris

=== Players out ===
- (Samoa) James Johnston to (England) Saracens
- (New Zealand) Tim Fairbrother retired
- (England) Chris Brooker to (England) Worcester Warriors
- (England) Peter Browne to (England) London Welsh
- (Wales) Olly Kohn retired
- (England) Will Skinner retired
- (England) Rory Clegg to (England) Newcastle Falcons
- (England) Miles Mantella to (England) London Scottish
- (England) Seb Stegmann to (England) London Welsh

== Leicester Tigers ==
=== Players in ===
- (Wales) Owen Williams from (Wales) Scarlets
- (England) Ryan Lamb from (England) Northampton Saints
- (Argentina) Gonzalo Camacho from (England) Exeter Chiefs
- (England) Neil Briggs from (England) London Welsh
- (England) Jamie Gibson from (England) London Irish
- (France) Jérôme Schuster from (France) USA Perpignan
- (France) David Mélé from (France) USA Perpignan
- (South Africa) Sebastian de Chaves from (France) Stade Montois
- (England) Tom Bristow from (England) London Welsh

=== Players out ===
- (England) Kieran Brookes to (England) Newcastle Falcons
- (England) Jonny Harris to (England) London Irish
- (England) Jimmy Stevens to (England) London Irish
- (England) Alex Lewington to (England) London Irish
- (England) Camilo Parilli-Ocampo to (England) Ealing Trailfinders
- (England) Charlie Clare to (England) Bedford Blues
- (England) Rob Andrew to (England) London Welsh
- (England) Brett Deacon retired
- (England) Richard Thorpe to (England) London Welsh
- (England) Ben Woods retired
- (Australia) Patrick Phibbs to (England) London Irish
- (England) George Ford to (England) Bath Rugby
- (England) Micky Young to (England) Bath Rugby
- (England) Matt Cornwell to (Italy) Mogliano
- (England) Andy Forsyth to (England) Sale Sharks
- (England) Andy Symons to (New Zealand) Tasman Makos
- (Italy) Martin Castrogiovanni to (France) Toulon
- (Ireland) Geordan Murphy retired

== London Irish ==
=== Players in ===
- (Wales) Andy Fenby from (Wales) Scarlets
- (Ireland) Jamie Hagan from (Ireland) Leinster
- (England) Jonny Harris from (England) Leicester Tigers
- (England) Jimmy Stevens from (England) Leicester Tigers
- (England) Alex Lewington from (England) Leicester Tigers
- (England) Matt Parr from (England) Nottingham
- (England) Nic Rouse from (England) Nottingham
- (New Zealand) Michael Mayhew from (England) Newcastle Falcons
- (Ireland) Eamonn Sheridan from (England) Rotherham Titans
- (Ireland) Fergus Mulchrone from (England) Rotherham Titans
- (Scotland) Blair Cowan from (England) Worcester Warriors
- (Australia) Patrick Phibbs from (England) Leicester Tigers
- (Australia) Myles Dorrian from (England) Exeter Chiefs
- (England) Guy Armitage from (France) Toulon
- (Wales) John Yapp from (Scotland) Edinburgh Rugby (season-Loan)
- (Australia) James O'Connor from (Australia) Melbourne Rebels

=== Players out ===
- (England) Alex Corbisiero to (England) Northampton Saints
- (England) Max Lahiff to (Australia) Melbourne Rebels
- (Fiji) Jerry Yanuyanutawa to (Scotland) Glasgow Warriors
- (Ireland) Brian Blaney released
- (England) James Buckland to (England) London Scottish
- (Scotland) Scott Lawson to (England) Newcastle Falcons
- (England) Shaun Malton to (England) Nottingham
- (Ireland) James Sandford to (England) Cornish Pirates
- (England) Jamie Gibson to (England) Leicester Tigers
- (England) Matt Garvey to (England) Bath Rugby
- Alex Gray to England Sevens
- (England) Anthony Watson to (England) Bath Rugby
- (England) David Sisi to (England) Bath Rugby
- (England) Jonathan Joseph to (England) Bath Rugby
- (Wales) Jack Moates to (England) London Wasps
- (Wales) Steven Shingler to (Wales) Scarlets
- (Scotland) Joe Ansbro retired
- (Ireland) Conor Gaston to (France) Aurillac

== London Wasps ==
=== Players in ===
- (England) Matt Mullan from (England) Worcester Warriors
- (Scotland) Neil Cochrane from (England) Bedford Blues
- (England) Jake Cooper-Woolley from (Wales) Cardiff Blues
- (England) Joe Carlisle from (England) Worcester Warriors
- (England) Andy Goode from (England) Worcester Warriors
- (England) Ricky Reeves from (England) Bedford Blues
- (England) Kearnan Myall from (England) Sale Sharks
- (Wales) Ed Jackson from (England) London Welsh
- (England) Guy Thompson from (England) Jersey
- (Fiji) Nathan Hughes from (New Zealand) North Harbour
- (Wales) Rory Pitman from (England) Rotherham Titans
- (Wales) Jack Moates from (England) London Irish
- (England) Josh Bassett from (England) Bedford Blues
- (Australia) Ben Jacobs from (Australia) Western Force
- (Tonga) William Helu from (New Zealand) Manly
- (Tonga) Taione Vea from (New Zealand) North Harbour
- (Argentina) Esteban Lozada from (France) Agen
- (Italy) Carlo Festuccia from (Italy) Zebre

=== Players out ===
- (England) Tim Payne retired
- (Samoa) Zak Taulafo to (France) Stade Français Paris
- (Italy) Fabio Staibano released
- (England) Lewis Thiede to (England) London Scottish
- (Wales) Rhys Thomas to (Wales) Newport Gwent Dragons
- (South Africa) Marco Wentzel released
- (England) Billy Vunipola to (England) Saracens
- (Australia) Nic Berry retired
- (Wales) Stephen Jones retired
- (Wales) Nicky Robinson to (England) Bristol Rugby
- (England) Will Robinson to (England) London Welsh
- (Wales) Lee Thomas retired
- (England) Jack Wallace to (England) Bristol Rugby

== Newcastle Falcons ==
=== Players in ===
- (England) Kieran Brookes from (England) Leicester Tigers
- (Scotland) Scott Lawson from (England) London Irish
- (England) Dominic Barrow from (England) Leeds Carnegie
- (Scotland) Fraser McKenzie from (England) Sale Sharks
- (England) Andy Saull from (England) Saracens
- (Scotland) Mike Blair from (France) CA Brive
- (England) Rory Clegg from (England) Harlequins
- (Scotland) Phil Godman from (England) London Scottish
- (Ireland) Danny Barnes from (Ireland) Munster
- (England) Noah Cato from (England) Northampton Saints
- (France) Franck Montanella from (England) London Welsh

=== Players out ===
- (England) Jon Golding retired
- (England) James Hall to (England) Bristol Rugby
- (New Zealand) Michael Mayhew to (England) London Irish
- (England) James Hudson to (England) Gloucester Rugby
- (England) Ollie Stedman to (England) London Welsh
- (Samoa) Taiasina Tuifu'a to (France) Union Bordeaux-Bègles
- (Scotland) Rory Lawson retired
- (England) Jordi Pasqualin to (England) London Scottish
- (New Zealand) Jimmy Gopperth to (Ireland) Leinster
- Luke Fielden to England Sevens

== Northampton Saints ==
=== Players in ===
- (England) Alex Corbisiero from (England) London Irish
- (England) Gareth Denman from (England) Rotherham Titans
- (Australia) Salesi Ma'afu from (Australia) Western Force
- (Samoa) Kahn Fotuali'i from (Wales) Ospreys
- (Wales) George North from (Wales) Scarlets
- (New Zealand) Rob Verbakel from (New Zealand) Otago
- (New Zealand) Glenn Dickson from (New Zealand) Otago

=== Players out ===
- (England) Paul Doran-Jones to (England) Harlequins
- (South Africa) Brian Mujati to (France) Racing Metro
- (Tonga) Soane Tongaʻuiha to (France) Racing Metro
- (New Zealand) Mark Sorenson to (England) Bristol Rugby
- (Wales) Rhys Oakley to (England) Plymouth Albion
- (Wales) Martin Roberts to (England) Bath Rugby
- (England) Ryan Lamb to (England) Leicester Tigers
- (England) Tom May to (England) London Welsh
- (England) Scott Armstrong to (England) Moseley
- (England) Noah Cato to (England) Newcastle Falcons

== Sale Sharks ==
=== Players in ===
- (England) Tom Arscott from (England) London Welsh
- (England) Andy Forsyth from (England) Leicester Tigers
- (Canada) Phil Mackenzie from (England) London Welsh
- (England) Daniel Baines from (England) Rotherham Titans
- (New Zealand) Michael Paterson from (Wales) Cardiff Blues
- (Russia) Kirill Kulemin from (England) London Welsh
- (England) Charlie Walker-Blair from (England) Jersey
- (Wales) Jonathan Mills from (England) London Welsh
- (England) Joe Ford from (England) Leeds Carnegie

=== Players out ===
- (Scotland) Alasdair Dickinson to (Scotland) Edinburgh Rugby
- (England) Tom Cruse to (England) Rotherham Titans
- (Scotland) Richie Gray to (France) Castres Olympique
- (Scotland) Richie Vernon to (Scotland) Glasgow Warriors
- (Wales) Andy Powell to (England) Wigan Warriors
- (England) Jordan Davies to (England) Salford City Reds
- (South Africa) Corne Uys to (France) Aix-en-Provence
- (England) Charlie Amesbury to (England) Bristol Rugby

== Saracens ==
=== Players in ===
- (Samoa) James Johnston from (England) Harlequins
- (England) Richard Barrington from (England) Jersey
- (England) Billy Vunipola from (England) London Wasps
- (England) Tim Streather from (England) Nottingham
- (Fiji) Michael Tagicakibau from (England) Bristol Rugby

=== Players out ===
- (Italy) Carlos Nieto retired
- (South Africa) John Smit retired
- (England) Andy Saull to (England) Newcastle Falcons
- (Fiji) Kameli Ratuvou to (Italy) Zebre
- (New Zealand) Joe Maddock retired

== Worcester Warriors ==
=== Players in ===
- (England) Paul Andrew from (England) Cornish Pirates
- (France) Jérémy Bécasseau from (France) Stade Français Paris (season-loan)
- (Tonga) Ofa Faingaʻanuku from (Scotland) Glasgow Warriors
- (England) Chris Brooker from (England) Harlequins
- (Argentina) Agustin Creevy from (France) Montpellier
- (Zimbabwe) Mike Williams from (South Africa) Blue Bulls
- (Wales) Jonathan Thomas from (Wales) Ospreys
- (New Zealand) Cameron Goodhue from (New Zealand) Blues
- (Argentina) Leonardo Senatore from (Argentina) Pampas XV
- (Samoa) Jeremy Su'a from (New Zealand) Crusaders
- (Argentina) Ignacio Mieres from (England) Exeter Chiefs
- (Australia) Paul Warwick from (France) Stade Français Paris
- (England) James Stephenson from (England) Bedford Blues
- (Argentina) Mariano Galarza from (Argentina) Pampas XV

=== Players out ===
- (England) Jamie Currie to (England) Leeds Carnegie
- (England) Matt Mullan to (England) London Wasps
- (Tonga) Tevita Taumoepeau retired
- (England) Ollie Hayes to (England) Bristol Rugby
- (Tonga) Aleki Lutui to (Scotland) Edinburgh Rugby
- (England) Craig Gillies retired
- (Ireland) Neil Best to (England) London Scottish
- (England) Matt Kvesic to (England) Gloucester Rugby
- (Scotland) Blair Cowan to (England) London Irish
- (England) Ollie Frost to (England) London Welsh
- (England) Shaun Perry retired
- (England) Joe Carlisle to (England) London Wasps
- (England) Andy Goode to (England) London Wasps
- (England) Andy Short to (England) Bristol Rugby
- (Scotland) Nikki Walker to (Scotland) Edinburgh Rugby
- (South Africa) Errie Claassens to (England) Bristol Rugby

== See also ==
- 2013–14 Premiership
