= James Hanks =

James Hanks may refer to:

- James M. Hanks (1833–1909), U.S. representative from Arkansas
- Jim Hanks (James Mathew Hanks, born 1961), American actor
- James Hanks (rugby union) (born 1984), English rugby union player
