= Tom Slater =

Tom Slater may refer to:

- Tom Slater (politician) (born 1945), American politician from Iowa
- Tom Slater (baseball) (born 1968), American baseball coach
- Tom Slater (rugby union) (born 1986), Welsh rugby player
- Tom Slater (soccer) (born 1994), Australian footballer
- Thomas C. Slater (1945–2009), American politician from Rhode Island
