= Hayes School =

Coordinates: 51.374633°N 0.019821°E

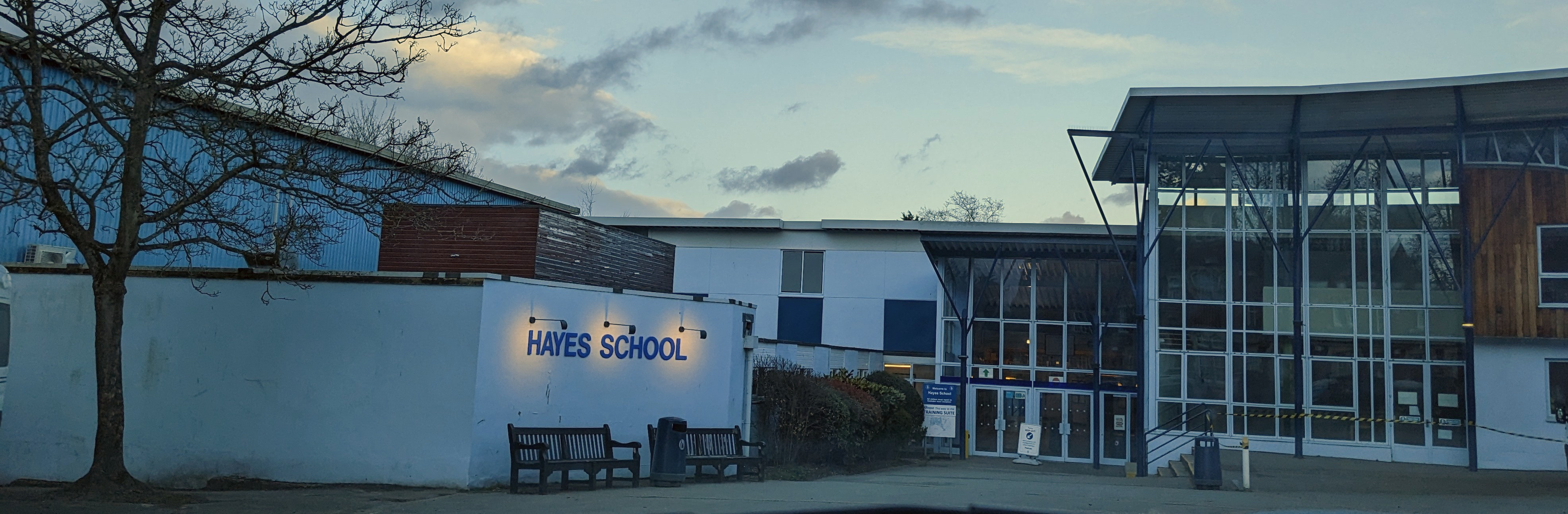

Location
- West Common Road; Bromley, London, BR2 7DB; England

Information
- Type: Academy
- Motto: Excellence through Endeavour with kindness and respect
- Established: 1956
- Department for Education URN: 136644 Tables
- Ofsted: Reports
- Headteacher: Rob Hitch
- Gender: Mixed
- Age: 11 to 18
- Enrolment: 1,726
- Houses: Blue (Neptune); Red (Mars); Green (Earth); Yellow (Venus)
- Website: www.hayes.bromley.sch.uk

Hayes School is a mixed secondary school with academy status located in the suburb of Hayes within the London Borough of Bromley.

The school has approximately 1,800 students, of whom 500 are in the sixth form.

== History ==
The school became independent from the local parish school in Hayes village in 1956. At that time, it was a boys-only school and operated solely from Gadsden, a Victorian Gothic mansion that now houses the reception area, school offices, and other facilities.

Shortly after opening, the school began admitting both boys and girls and expanded to what is now known as A Block. Further growth followed, including the opening of C Block in 2003, which featured a state-of-the-art library — unique in London at the time — and an upgraded Music Department.

In 2006, L Block was added, marking the school's 50th anniversary. The occasion was celebrated with a fair that also served as a fundraising event.

The most recent addition is M Block, which opened in the summer of 2010. It was developed over a short period from March to September and now houses facilities for Media Studies, Drama, and the Library.

The school gained academy status on 1 April 2011.

The school's two most recent Ofsted Reports, in 2011 and 2013, both awarded the school Outstanding status.

== Notable former pupils ==
- Lynsey Askew – England cricketer
- Alex Blake – cricketer
- Andrew Davenport – co-creator of Teletubbies
- Lydia Greenway – England cricketer
- Gary Johnson – rugby union player
- Finn Jones – actor
- Jessica Plummer – actress and singer
- Richard Preddy – comedy writer
- Pete Sears – musician
- David Spinx – actor
