= Adam Brown (rugby union) =

Welsh rugby union player

- Born: Adam Brown; 25 September 1987 (age 39) Newport, Wales

Rugby union career
Senior career
Years	Team	Apps	(Points)
2007–2011	Newport Gwent Dragons	10	(0)
2011-2013	London Welsh		
2013-	Newport RFC		

Adam Brown (born 25 September 1987 in Newport, Wales) is a Welsh rugby union player.

A lock, he played for the Newport Gwent Dragons having progressed through the Dragons Academy. He made his debut for the Dragons on 15 February 2008 against Ulster.

Brown has represented the Wales national rugby union team at Under-19 and Under 20 levels. He previously played for Newport RFC, Pontypool United RFC and Bedwas RFC.

He was released by the Newport Gwent Dragons at the end of the 2010–11 Magners League and joined London Welsh.

After being released by London Welsh, he returned to Wales to join Newport RFC
