= Tristan Roberts =

English rugby union player

- Born: Tristan Daniel Roberts; 23 March 1987 (age 39) Maidstone, Kent, England
- Height: 1.66 m (5 ft 5 in)
- Weight: 82 kg (12 st 13 lb)
- School: Sutton Valence School

Rugby union career
- Position: Fly-half
- Current team: Esher
Senior career
Years	Team	Apps	(Points)
2006–2007	Cinderford	30	(292)
2007–2010	Gloucester	0	(0)
2008–2010	Moseley (D/R)	52	(461)
2010–2011	Doncaster Knights	30	(358)
2011–2014	Bristol Bears	55	(383)
2014–15	London Welsh	15	(28)
2015-16	Ealing Trailfinders	14	(25)
2016-	US Cognac		
–	Esher		
- Correct as of 23 April 2016

Tristan Roberts (born 23 March 1987 in Maidstone, England) is a rugby union player who currently plays for Esher in National League 1, having previously been at US Cognac (France's third division) and Ealing Trailfinders (RFU Championship). He has represented both the England Students and the England Counties XV and during his rugby career has progressed from playing in the fourth tier with Cinderford to playing in the Premiership with London Welsh. Tristan has played much of his career at fly-half and has a reputation as a very reliable points kicker who is also excellent at drop kicks.

== Playing career ==
=== Early career ===
A late developer when it came to rugby union, Tristan focused on hockey at school playing at county level. He first started seriously playing rugby at 16 and found that this was the sport for him, appearing for the youth team of his local rugby team - Sevenoaks. At 17 he moved to Hartpury College to further his rugby education and was later picked up by Cinderford, then playing in National Division Three South, and was made part of the squad for the 2006-07 season. Tristan made 11 appearances in his first season, scoring 105 points including four drop kicks which earned him call-ups for both Kent and English Counties XV at the end of 2007. A second season for the Gloucestershire side saw Tristan become a regular fixture in the first team, finishing as the fourth top points scorer in the league with 187 points from 19 games, and helping ultimately helping Cinderford to gain promotion to National Division Two (although he did not feature in their playoff game). After impressing at Cinderford, Tristan was picked up by Gloucester where he would become part of their academy squad. He played a number of academy games but was unable to instantly break into the first team and was instead loaned to Moseley for experience.

=== Moseley ===
Tristan joined the Moseley for the start of the 2008-09 season plying his trade in National Division One. Despite playing at a league two levels higher than that of Cinderford, Tristan managed to play 22 games in all competitions, scoring 169 points, helping the Birmingham-based side to a mid-table position and also contributing 10 points against Leeds Carnegie at Twickenham to claim the 2009 EDF Energy National Trophy 23 - 18. Changes to the English league system saw National Division One be rebranded to the Championship for the 2009-10 season and with only 12 teams it was much more competitive with Moseley finishing 9th at the end of the regular season and being placed in the new format relegation group. Moseley survived the relegation group by finishing 2nd and Tristan had the best season of his career in scoring terms - being the top scorer in the league at the end of the regular season and finishing 3rd overall with 267 points from 26 games.

=== Doncaster Knights / Bristol ===
After two seasons at Moseley, Tristan moved north to join Doncaster Knights. He only spent a year at Castle Park but scored 358 points in 30 games across all competitions which attracted the interest of former Premiership team Bristol who signed Tristan for the 2011-12 season. Although he had a good first season for Bristol, the club failed to win promotion despite topping the league table, as they went out of the playoff semi finals due to a shock 53 - 63 aggregate defeat to the Cornish Pirates. The ever increasing pressure at Bristol to gain promotion would lead to Tristan becoming a squad player rather than starter and he was released at the end of 2014, joining London Welsh in the summer.

=== London Welsh / Ealing Trailfinders ===
It was somewhat ironic that despite being released by Bristol he managed to achieve something they were desperate for - Premiership rugby - which Welsh had gained at Bristol's expense. Other than that it was neither a good season for Tristan or his club as they struggled to attract fans to their ground at Oxford and were relegated from the Premiership having failed to win a single game. Although Tristan played a number of matches he was unable to become a regular and left the club in 2015 to join Ealing Trailfinders. After the 2015–16 season Tristan left Ealing to start a new adventure in France with US Cognac who play in Fédérale 1 (division 3 of the French rugby union league system).

== Season-by-season stats ==
Season	Club	Competition	Appearances	Tries	Drop Goals	Conversions	Penalties	Total Points
2006–07	Cinderford	National Division 3 South	11	2	4	16	17	105
2007–08	Cinderford	National Division 3 South	19	4	2	40	27	187
2007–08	Gloucester	Guinness Premiership	0	0	0	0	0	0
2008–09	Gloucester	Guinness Premiership	0	0	0	0	0	0
2008–09	Gloucester	Anglo-Welsh Cup	0	0	0	0	0	0
2008–09	Moseley	National One	18	6	0	30	15	140
2008–09	Moseley	EDF Energy Trophy	5	0	0	11	4	34
2009–10	Gloucester	Guinness Premiership	0	0	0	0	0	0
2009–10	Gloucester	Anglo-Welsh Cup	0	0	0	0	0	0
2009–10	Moseley	RFU Championship	26	4	1	29	62	267
2009–10	Moseley	British & Irish Cup	3	1	0	6	1	20
2010–11	Doncaster Knights	RFU Championship	27	8	6	58	45	309
2010–11	Doncaster Knights	British & Irish Cup	3	1	0	7	10	49
2011–12	Bristol	RFU Championship	19	1	2	32	43	204
2011–12	Bristol	British & Irish Cup	0	0	0	0	0	0
2012–13	Bristol	RFU Championship	18	0	0	10	15	65
2012–13	Bristol	British & Irish Cup	6	1	0	13	7	52
2013–14	Bristol	RFU Championship	8	4	0	13	3	55
2013–14	Bristol	British & Irish Cup	4	0	0	2	1	7
2014–15	London Welsh	Aviva Premiership	8	0	0	2	0	4
2014–15	London Welsh	Anglo-Welsh Cup	3	1	0	1	2	11
2014–15	London Welsh	European Challenge Cup	4	0	0	2	3	13
2015–16	Ealing Trailfinders	RFU Championship	11	0	1	4	4	23
2015–16	Ealing Trailfinders	British & Irish Cup	3	0	0	1	0	2
2016–17	US Cognac	Fédérale 1						

== Honours ==
Moseley

- EDF Energy National Trophy: 2009

International/Representative

- Represented England Students
- Represented Kent
- Called up for England Counties XV tour of south-east France: 2007
