= James Merriman (rugby union) =

- Born: James Merriman; 17 January 1984 (age 42) Wales
- School: Llandovery College

Rugby union career
National sevens team
Years	Team	Comps
2009	Wales 7s	
Medal record
Men's rugby sevens
Representing Wales
Rugby World Cup Sevens
Gold medal – first place	2009 Dubai	Team competition

James Merriman (born 17 January 1984) is a Welsh rugby union rugby player for Bristol Rugby. A flanker, he has captained the Wales Under-21 side and has played for the Wales Sevens team. He was part of the Wales Sevens team that won the 2009 Rugby World Cup Sevens.
