= Jon Goodridge =

English rugby union player

- Born: 26 February 1981 (age 45) Oxford, Oxfordshire
- Height: 6 ft 0 in (183 cm)
- Weight: 14 st 4 lb (91 kg)
- School: St Edward's School, Oxford

Rugby union career
- Position: Fullback
Senior career
Years	Team	Apps	(Points)
2001-2007	Gloucester		
2007–2010	Leeds Carnegie		
2010-2011	Esher		
2011-	Bristol		

Jon Goodridge (born 26 February 1981) is a professional rugby union player for Bristol Rugby. He tends to play at Fullback. He possesses an excellent long range kicking game and being left footed he gives the team plenty of options.

Goodridge, who is also comfortable as a winger, spent six years with Gloucester before a three-year spell at his hometown club, Leeds.

Goodridge made his debut for Gloucester in 2001, scoring 7 tries in 54 appearances. He then moved to Leeds where he played a key role during the clubs National One promotion season, scoring four tries in a memorable performance during Leeds' victory over Moseley.

He was first-choice fullback during Leeds' survival in the 2009-10 Aviva Premiership. Goodridge made 18 Premiership appearances at Leeds before departing in 2010 when he joined Esher RFC.

Goodridge signed for Bristol in June 2011.
