= Henry Vanderglas =

Australian rugby union player

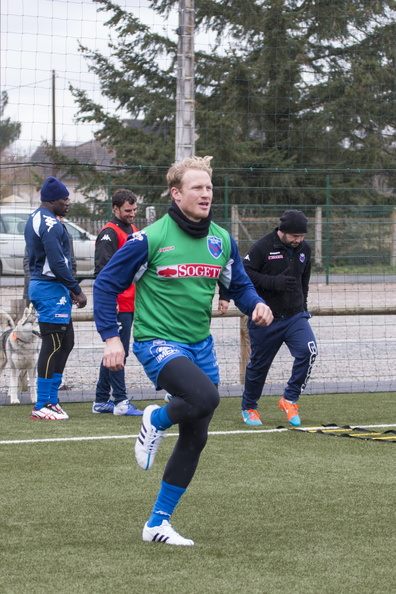
- Born: Henry Vanderglas; 9 May 1986 (age 40) Canberra, Australia
- Height: 194 cm (6 ft 4 in)
- Weight: 109 kg (17 st 2 lb)
- School: St Edmund's College

Rugby union career
Provincial / State sides
Years	Team	Apps	(Points)
- Eastern Suburbs
Super Rugby
Years	Team	Apps	(Points)
2009–12	Brumbies	7	(0)

Henry Vanderglas (born 9 May 1986 in Canberra, ACT) is an Australian rugby union player who currently plays for FC Grenoble, having previously played for the Brumbies and Bristol Rugby. Vanderglas, who plays at flanker, made his debut for the Brumbies during the 2009 Super 14 season.
