= David Doherty (rugby union) =

English rugby union & league footballer

- Born: David Doherty; 28 January 1987 (age 39) Leeds, West Yorkshire, England
- Height: 6 ft 0 in (1.83 m)
- Weight: 13 st 0 lb (83 kg)
- School: Mount St Mary's School; Notre Dame Catholic Sixth Form College

Rugby union career
- Position: Fullback / Wing
- Current team: Yorkshire Carnegie
Youth career
- -: Churwell JARLFC
- –: Drighlington ARLFC
- –: West Leeds RUFC
Senior career
Years	Team	Apps	(Points)
2004–06	Yorkshire Carnegie		
2006–08	Wasps		
2008–10	Sale Sharks		
2010–11	Jersey		
2011–12	Cornish Pirates		
2012–16	Yorkshire Carnegie		
International career
Years	Team	Apps	(Points)
–	England U16s		
–	England U18s		
–	England U20s		
–	Barbarians		
National sevens team
Years	Team		Comps
- England Sevens
- Rugby league career

Playing information
Club
Years	Team	Pld	T	G	FG	P
	Leeds Rhinos
Representative
Years	Team	Pld	T	G	FG	P
	Great Britain U18s

David Doherty (born 28 January 1987 in Leeds, West Yorkshire, England) is an English former rugby union footballer who played as a fullback or on the wing, and could also operate in the centres. He played for Yorkshire Carnegie, Wasps, Sale Sharks and Cornish Pirates.

== Rugby union career ==
Doherty was a former rugby league junior with Leeds Rhinos, but decided to pursue a career in the 15 a-side code. He made his debut with Leeds Tykes in May 2004, aged 17 years and 95 days, making him the youngest player in Premiership history. He joined Wasps after Leeds Tykes were relegated from the 2005-06 Guinness Premiership.

In May 2008, it was announced that Doherty would be joining Sale Sharks on a two-year contract. His contract was not renewed by Sale and in June 2010 he was released. In October 2010, it was announced that he had signed for National League 2 South team Jersey. Doherty made the perfect start to his Jersey career, scoring a try on his debut.

On 21 April 2011, it was announced that Doherty would be joining RFU Championship side the Cornish Pirates at the end of the 2010-11 RFU Championship. He finished the season as top try scorer for the Cornish Pirates with 14 in 24 Championship appearances and in 2012–13 will play for Yorkshire Carnegie.

After not being offered a new contract in 2016, Doherty became director of rugby at Harrogate. He stepped down in 2022.
