= Phil Boulton =

- Born: Philip Boulton; 14 December 1986 (age 39) Lincoln, Lincolnshire
- Height: 6 ft 2 in (1.88 m)
- Weight: 120 kg (265 lb)

Rugby union career
- Position: Prop
- Current team: Coventry RFC
Youth career
- 1998–2003: Lincoln RFC
Senior career
Years	Team	Apps	(Points)
2004–2005	Rotherham Titans		
2005–2008	Leicester Tigers		
2006–2007	Nuneaton (loan)		
2007–2008	Rotherham Titans (loan)		
2008–2016	Bedford Blues	57	(89)
2016-	Coventry		
International career
Years	Team	Apps	(Points)
2008	England Counties XV		

Philip Boulton (born 14 December 1986) is a retired English rugby union player who played for Championship side, Coventry RFC as a tighthead prop. His former clubs include Rotherham Titans, Leicester Tigers, Nuneaton RFC and Bedford Blues. He has also represented the England Counties XV side.

== Early life ==
Boulton was born in Lincoln, Lincolnshire and grew up in a small village. He didn't begin to play rugby until he was in secondary school at De Aston School in Market Rasen. He had initially tried his hand at playing football. He began playing for Lincoln RFC in 1998 and progressed through the age groups before leaving in 2003, when, after leaving secondary school at the age of 16, he was offered a rugby scholarship at Worksop College.

== Career ==
At the age of 18, Boulton began training with Rotherham Titans and later progressed to play for the club before being invited to join the academy setup at Leicester Tigers under the stewardship of Richard Cockerill. After signing a two-year scholarship deal he was loaned out to Nuneaton RFC before returning to Rotherham Titans the season after. He eventually left Leicester after failing to make the first team and moved on to the Bedford Blues on a permanent deal. In 2008, Boulton played for the England Counties XV against the United States Eagles.

Boulton captained Coventry RFC to win the National League 1 in 2017–18.

== Personal life ==
Boulton was a Leicester Tigers fan as a youngster.
