= Henry Staff =

English rugby union player

- Born: Henry Staff; 8 March 1991 (age 35)
- Height: 6 ft 2 in (1.88 m)
- Weight: 105 kg (231 lb)
- School: Bedford Modern School
- University: Loughborough University

Rugby union career
- Position: Centre
- Current team: Bedford Blues
Senior career
Years	Team	Apps	(Points)
2009–	Saracens F.C.		
–	Rosslyn Park F.C.		

Henry Staff (born 8 March 1991) is an English professional rugby union player who plays for RFU Championship side, Bedford Blues as a Centre.

== Career ==
Educated at Bedford Modern School, Staff showed precocious talent for the game and in 2009 was made Captain of the England U18 team for Rugby Europe. Staff made his professional debut with Saracens F.C., having been part of the 2008 Saracens Academy with Owen Farrell, before joining Bedford Blues for two years. He then signed for Rosslyn Park F.C. for 11 months before returning to Bedford Blues in June 2014. Staff attributes his rugby success to the guidance given by his better looking, lighter, more successful friend, Charlie Carter.
