= Darren Waters =

Welsh rugby union footballer (born 1985)

- Born: Darren Waters; 14 June 1985 (age 41) Beddau, Rhondda Cynon Taf, Wales
- Height: 185 cm (6 ft 1 in)
- Weight: 102 kg (16 st 1 lb)

Rugby union career
- Current team: London Welsh
Senior career
Years	Team	Apps	(Points)
2009-2011	Pontypridd	56	(55)
2011–2014	Newport Gwent Dragons	23	(0)
2014-2016	London Welsh	22	(35)
- Correct as of 26 June 2014

Darren Waters (born 14 August 1985) is a Welsh rugby union player. His position is openside flanker. Waters played for the Newport Gwent Dragons regional team having joined them from Pontypridd in May 2011. In June 2014 Waters joined London Welsh.
