= Mark Lilley =

English rugby union player

- Born: 12 October 1987 (age 39) Bath, England
- Height: 1.91 m (6 ft 3 in)
- Weight: 119 kg (18 st 10 lb)
- School: Ralph Allen School; City of Bath College

Rugby union career
- Position(s): Hooker, Prop
- Current team: Bristol
Senior career
Years	Team	Apps	(Points)
2009–2012	Bath Rugby	7	(0)
2012-	Bristol		
2014-	London Scottish (loan)		
International career
Years	Team	Apps	(Points)
	England U20	3	(0)

Mark Lilley (born 12 October 1987) is an English Rugby Union player who plays for London Scottish on loan from Bristol in the RFU Championship. He made his debut for his former club Bath Rugby off the bench on 31 October 2009 against Saracens. His preferred position is prop, but he can also play hooker. He has also played for Somerset U18 and England U20. At the beginning of the 2012–13 season, Mark Lilley signed a permanent deal to leave Bath for Bristol, although he was a product of the Bath Academy.
