= Ben Glynn =

English rugby union player

- Born: Ben Glynn; 27 March 1991 (age 35) Cheltenham, England
- Height: 1.98 m (6 ft 6 in)
- Weight: 120 kg (18 st 13 lb; 260 lb).

Rugby union career
- Position: Lock
- Current team: Ospreys
Youth career
- Old Patesians RFC
Senior career
Years	Team	Apps	(Points)
2010–2017	Bristol	99	(15)
2017–2019	Harlequins	13	(0)
2019–2020	Ospreys	0	(0)
2020	→ Northampton Saints	0	(0)

Ben Glynn (born 27 March 1991) is a British professional rugby union player. His primary position is Lock.

== Club career ==
=== Old Patesians ===
Glynn begun playing rugby in his home town, Cheltenham, at Old Patesians RFC, Youth side.

=== Bristol ===
Glynn made his first start for the senior Bristol side in 2010, having joined at 18 years old. His 15 starts in Bristol's 2015–16 RFU Championship season, helped the west country side gain promotion to the top flight of English Rugby. He stayed with Bristol as they began their top flight season in the Aviva Premiership 2016-2017. Bristol failed to adapt to the top-flight of English rugby and were relegated in May 2017. However Glynn's solid presence in the middle of the field had not gone un-noticed by Premiership sides.

=== Harlequins ===
On 3 July 2017 Glynn signed for Harlequins. At the time his role was to be backup at Lock for the then injured Sam Twomey. However Glynn soon became a first team regular in Harlequins 2017/18 Aviva Premiership season. His success on the pitch, saw Glynn signing a new contract with Harlequins, on 1 December 2017. His first Quins' contract had only been for one year.

=== Ospreys ===
After his release from Harlequins, Glynn sign for Welsh region Ospreys in the Pro 14 from the 2019-20 season. He was released following the 2019–20 season.

=== Northampton Saints ===
On 20 February 2020 it was announced that Glynn would be joining Northampton Saints on a short-term loan deal from Ospreys.

== International ==
Glynn has been capped at U18 level for England.
