= Lee Beach =

Welsh rugby union footballer

- Born: 6 October 1982 (age 44) Maerdy, Wales
- Height: 6ft 3 1.91 m (6 ft 3 in)
- Weight: 115 kg (18 st 2 lb)

Rugby union career
- Position: Loose forward
Senior career
Years	Team	Apps	(Points)
- London Welsh
–	Neath RFC		
–	Pontypridd RFC		
–	Ospreys		
–	Newport RFC		
–	Bargoed RFC		
National sevens team
Years	Team		Comps
- Wales 7s
Medal record
Men's rugby sevens
Representing Wales
Rugby World Cup Sevens
Gold medal – first place	2009 Dubai	Team competition

Lee Beach (born 6 October 1982) is a Welsh rugby union player. Lee was born and raised in Maerdy in Rhondda Valleys. Lee started his rugby life playing for his Home Team Maerdy RFC and Tylorstown RFC youth, Lee was noticed by scouts from around Wales and was signed up by Pontypridd RFC at the age of 18. Lee initially played his club rugby for Pontypridd RFC, and was involved with developing other young players as a rugby development officer. he then played for Neath RFC then followed by a couple of years at the Ospreys where he played alongside the likes of Shane Williams, Lee Byrne, Alyn Wyn Jones, James Hook, Andy Powell, Lee played in the famous victory when the Ospreys beat Australia national team at the liberty stadium (aka the council ground).

Lee then moved to London Welsh where he gained promotion to the English premier league.

Lee Beach represented the Wales Sevens squad in 2009 and captained the 2009 IRB Rugby World Cup Sevens winning team in Dubai.

Lee Beach retired from playing professionally in June 2013

He captained Newport RFC in the Welsh Premiership, after leaving Newport Lee took up a player coach role at Bargoed RFC playing in the Welsh Rugby Premiership.

Lee hung up his boots in 2018/19 but still regularly plays in invitational 7s tournaments around the world, he also gets involved in various rugby veteran charity matches with other ex professional players.

Lee now coaches Ferndale RFC in division 4 east central taking up the role for the 23/24 season
