= Jonny Harris (rugby union) =

English rugby union player (born 1991)

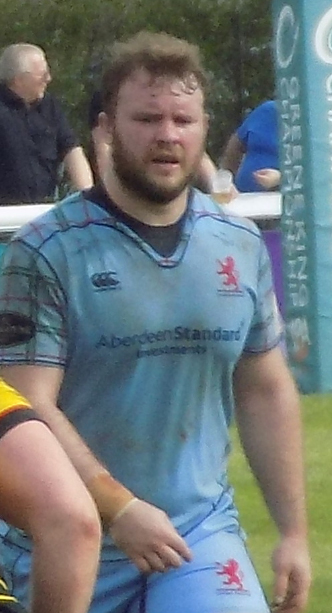
- Born: 15 January 1991 (age 35) Kevelaer, Germany
- Height: 1.86 m (6 ft 1 in)
- Weight: 120 kg (18 st 13 lb; 265 lb)
- School: Kings School Ely

Rugby union career
- Position: Prop
- Current team: London Scottish
Youth career
- Swaffham RUFC
- –: North Walsham RUFC
Senior career
Years	Team	Apps	(Points)
2008–2013	Leicester Tigers		
2013-2016	London Irish		
2016-present	London Scottish F.C.		

Jonny Harris (born 15 January 1991) is an English rugby union player, currently at championship side London Scottish R.F.C. He plays as a loose-head prop.

== Early life ==
Harris was born in Kevelaer, Germany, where his father was a Pilot in the RAF. The family moved to England in the summer of 1991, before residing in Norfolk. He started playing rugby at his local club, Swaffham RUFC, along with his two brothers Alexander and Andrew, before moving to North Walsham RUFC, where he played until he was picked up by Leicester Tigers Academy at age 17. Harris went on to play with the England Under 19's and was part of the Under 20's training squad.

== Rugby career ==
Harris was in the Academy at Leicester Tigers for two years, before signing a First Team deal in 2010 where he continued to develop as a player, and also spent time on loan with Nottingham RFC. He made his debut for the 1st XV age 18 against Leeds at Welford Road in 2009. His time at Leicester Tigers saw him be part of the successful A-League team that won the competition in 2010 and 2011, and was part of the Leicester Tigers squad which saw them win the premiership in the 2012/13 season. He then signed for London Irish on a three-year deal at the end of the 2013 season, where he played a part in their Premiership, European and LV Cup campaigns.

In 2016, Harris signed with RFU Championship side London Scottish for the 2016–17 season.
