= Gary Johnson (rugby union) =

English rugby union player

- Born: Gary Johnson; 24 April 1984 (age 42) Farnborough, London
- Height: 1.93 m (6 ft 4 in)
- Weight: 108 kg (17 st 0 lb)
- School: Hayes School

Rugby union career
- Position: Lock
- Current team: London Irish
Youth career
- -: Beccehamians RFC
- –: Blackheath F.C.
Senior career
Years	Team	Apps	(Points)
2003–2011	London Irish	26	(0)
2011–2012	London Welsh		
2012–2014	Cornish Pirates		
2014-	Ealing Trailfinders		

Gary Johnson (born 24 April 1984 in Farnborough, London, England) is a Rugby Union player for Cornish Pirates RFC in the Aviva Championship, playing primarily as a Lock. He previously played for London Irish for 10 seasons.

Johnson made his London Irish debut against London Wasps, in the 2006–07 EDF Energy Cup.

Johnson played in the final of the 2008–09 Guinness Premiership at Twickenham, as London Irish were defeated by the Leicester Tigers.
