= Mark Irish =

English rugby union player

- Born: 25 August 1981 (age 45) Bridgwater, England
- Height: 6 ft 0 in (1.83 m)
- Weight: 16 st 5 lb (104 kg)

Rugby union career
- Position: Prop
- Current team: London Scottish
Senior career
Years	Team	Apps	(Points)
2003–2004	Gloucester		
2005-	Bristol	36	(0)
–	London Scottish		
- Correct as of 14 March 2009
International career
Years	Team	Apps	(Points)
- England U21
2005–2006	England Students		
- Correct as of 9 Sept 2007

Mark Irish (born 25 August 1981) is an English rugby union footballer who plays at prop for London Scottish.

Irish joined Gloucester from amateur club Bridgwater but failed to play a first team game and was released at the end of the 2003–04 season. He signed a 2-year contract with Bristol in February 2005.

Irish is a former England U21 international.
