= Jérémy Bécasseau =

French rugby union player

Jérémy Bécasseau (born 18 July 1991) is a rugby union player for Worcester Warriors in the Aviva Premiership.

He plays as a prop. He is 5 foot 10 in height and weights 16 stone.

Worcester signed Jeremy from Stade Français in June 2013. The front rower has previously had playing spells at US Carcassonne in the Pro D2 and was at Dijon in Federale 1 before being given his chance in the Top 14.
