= Grant Pointer =

English rugby union player

- Born: Grant Harry Pointer; 11 December 1987 (age 38) Norwich, England
- Height: 1.85 m (6 ft 1 in)
- Weight: 100 kg (15 st 10 lb; 220 lb)
- School: Gresham's School, Holt,
- University: Loughborough University

Rugby union career
- Position: Fullback / Wing / Centre
- Current team: Jersey
Youth career
- 2009–2010: Loughborough Students RUFC
Senior career
Years	Team	Apps	(Points)
2009–2010	Northampton Saints		
2010–2013	Cornish Pirates	53	(131)
2013–	Jersey		
International career
Years	Team	Apps	(Points)
- England Students

Grant Harry Pointer (born 11 December 1987 in Norwich, England) is an English rugby union player who plays at Centre or Wing for the Cornish Pirates in the RFU Championship.

Educated at Gresham's School in Holt, Norfolk, he played rugby there alongside brothers Ben and Tom Youngs, and Ben Pienaar, who are all now at the Leicester Tigers. As a gifted athlete, Grant went to the National Prep School Finals for the long jump, he also broke the school triple jump record when he was 17 with a distance of 13.03 metres.

When studying Architectural Engineering and Design Management at Loughborough University, Grant proved himself something of a points machine during the students' National League Three North campaign, scoring 130 points, 7 tries, 25 conversions and 15 penalties in 17 matches.

His prowess was also recognised at national level, proving himself to be a match winner for the England Students on more than one occasion.

In February 2009, his injury–time try beat Irish Colleges and a month later he scored all the points, two tries, a conversion and a penalty as England beat France Universities 15–13.

He joined the Northampton Saints Senior Academy in 2009, playing then as a full-back/wing and was named in the squad to play the Ospreys in the LV Cup. He was also selected in the squad for a 2008–09 Guinness Premiership match against Bath.

Grant signed for the Cornish Pirates at the end of May 2010, at the same time as prop James Currie. Grant proved a big hit in his first season with the Pirates, he displayed power and pace, making 30 appearances mainly on the wing and showed he could also kick a ball a fair old distance.

In total he crossed for 10 tries, 8 RFU Championship, one cup and one friendly and was unlucky to miss out on the end of season semi-final and two–legged final matches, having had to undergo an appendicitis operation.
