= Wayne Thompson (rugby union) =

English rugby union player

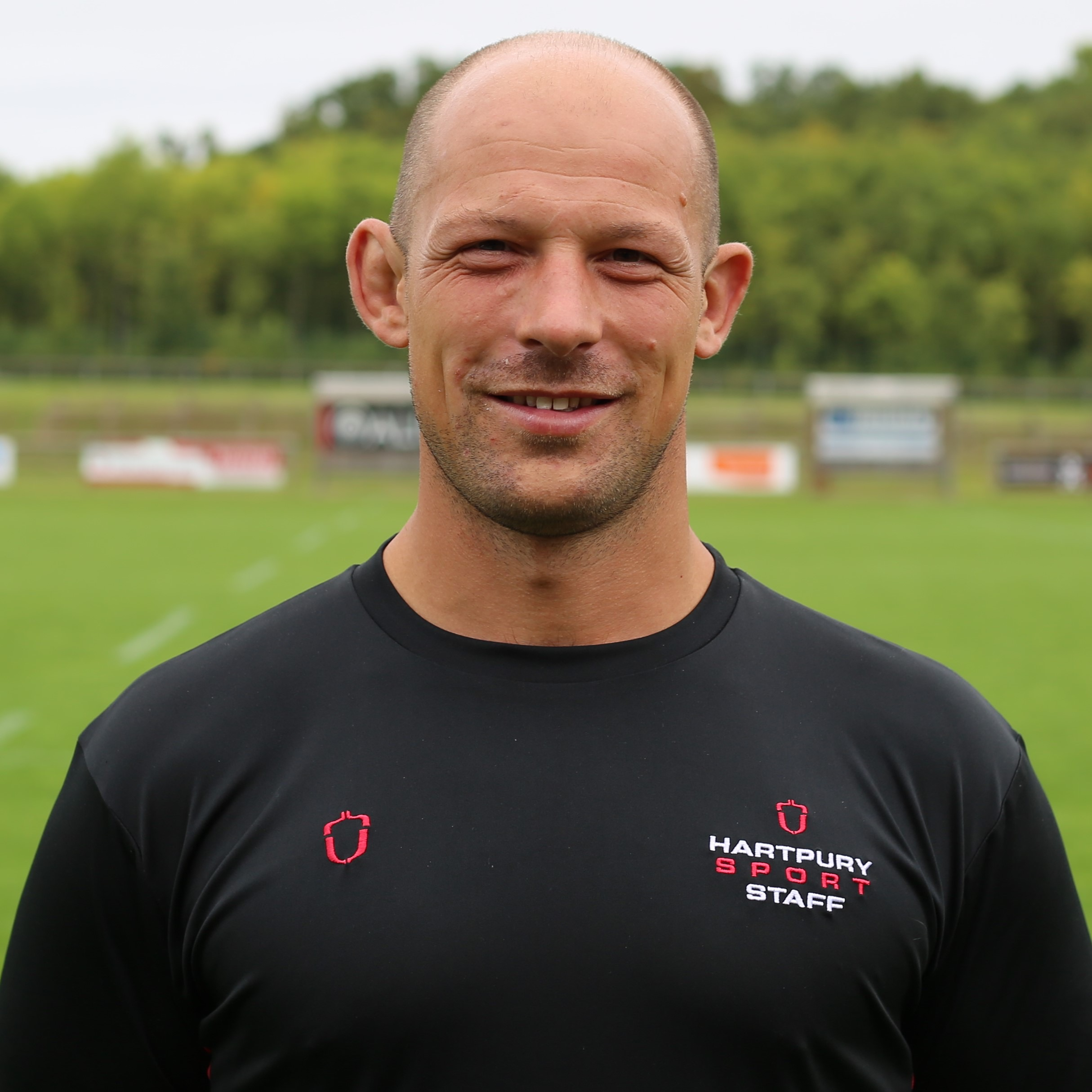
- Born: 19 March 1984 (age 42) Bristol, England
- Height: 6 ft 0 in (1.83 m)
- Weight: 114 kg (251 lb; 17 st 13 lb)
- School: Marlwood School
- University: University of Bristol, University of Oxford

Rugby union career
- Position: Prop
- Current team: Hartpury College R.F.C.
Senior career
Years	Team	Apps	(Points)
2002–2014	Bristol	154	(10)
2014–2019	Hartpury College R.F.C.	99	
- Correct as of 16 August 2024
International career
Years	Team	Apps	(Points)
- England U18
–	England U19		
–	England U21		
–	England Students		
–	England Universities		
- Correct as of 1 September 2024

Wayne Thompson (born 19 March 1984) is an English rugby union player who played as a prop for Bristol and is a product of Bristol's Academy. He worked at Hartpury College between 2013-2024 as Junior Rugby Academy Manager and is now Head of Academy at Gloucester Rugby Club.

Thompson was a Captain of Marlwood School in South Gloucestershire and later attended Bristol University and then Oxford University, gaining a rugby blue in 2008.

In March 2008, he signed a new two-year contract with Bristol before extending this in January 2010. The club did not reveal the length of the contract extension.

Whilst at Hartpury, Thompson oversaw the development of 32 age-grade internationals, including the likes of Louis Rees Zammit Dafydd Jenkins Stephen Varney Alex Craig Josh Hathaway and Harry Randall.
