= Donald Barrell =

English rugby union player

- Born: Donald Barrell Watford, England
- Height: 6 ft 4 in (1.93 m)
- Weight: 105 kg (16 st 7 lb)
- School: Watford Grammar School for Boys
- University: University College London

Rugby union career
- Position(s): Flanker, Number Eight
- Current team: Saracens F.C.
Youth career
- Harrow RFC
Senior career
Years	Team	Apps	(Points)
2003–2011	Saracens F.C.	38	(15)
2011–	Bedford Blues		
International career
Years	Team	Apps	(Points)
- England U19's
–	England Sevens		

Donald Barrell (born 3 February 1986 in Watford) is a rugby union player for the Bedford Blues in the Aviva Championship. He formerly played for Saracens in the Aviva Premiership. Barrell's position of choice is at Flanker or No. 8.

== Career ==
Barrell attended Watford Grammar School for Boys and played for his school team. He went on to study Anthropology at University College London.

Barrell made his club debut aged 18 in the 2003–04 Zurich Premiership against the Northampton Saints. Barrell represented the England U19's at the 2005 U19 IRB World Championship. He was a part of the wider England Sevens squad in the 2006–07 IRB Sevens World Series.
