= Franck Montanella =

French rugby union player (born 1982)

- Born: 26 March 1982 (age 44) Cannes, France
- Height: 1.91 m (6 ft 3 in)
- Weight: 125 kg (19 st 10 lb)

Rugby union career
- Position: Prop
Senior career
Years	Team	Apps	(Points)
2001-2003	Narbonne		
2003-2005	Strasbourg		
2005-2007	Auch	56	(30)
2007-2009	Stade Français	35	(5)
2009-2011	Aix-en-Provence	43	(15)
2011-2012	Bourgoin	24	(20)
2012-2013	London Welsh	19	(10)
2013-2014	Newcastle Falcons	9	(0)
2014-	Biarritz Olympique		
International career
Years	Team	Apps	(Points)
2007	France	1	(0)

Franck Montanella (born 26 March 1982) is a French rugby union footballer. He played for FC Auch in the 2006-07 Pro Rugby D2, which Auch won. His usual position is as a prop. He was also included in France's mid-year Test squad for 2007 in the two-game series against the All Blacks in New Zealand. He then played for Aix-en-Provence until the 2012 season when he moved to the newly promoted London Welsh. After his release from London Welsh, Montanella signed for Newcastle Falcons on a two-year contract to stay in the Aviva Premiership.
