= Neil Cochrane =

Scottish rugby union player (born 1984)

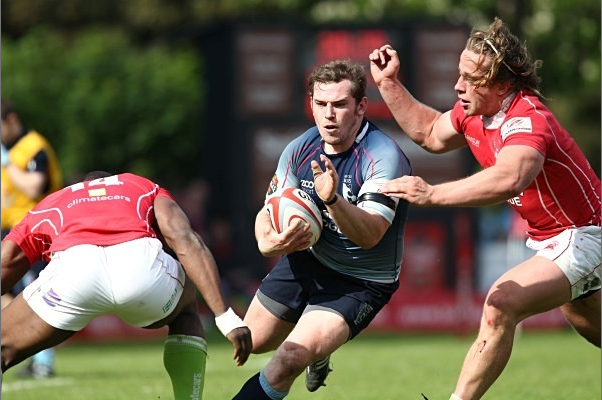
- Cochrane playing for Bedford Blues against London Welsh in 2012
- Born: Neil Cochrane; 4 January 1984 (age 42) Edinburgh, Scotland
- Height: 1.78 m (5 ft 10 in)
- Weight: 104 kg (16 st 5 lb)
- School: Boroughmuir High School
- University: University of Reading

Rugby union career
- Position: Hooker
Senior career
Years	Team	Apps	(Points)
2005–2008	Rotherham Titans	83	(70)
2008–2011	Doncaster Knights	75	(60)
2011–2013	Bedford Blues	50	(70)
2013–2014	London Wasps	8	(10)
2014–2018	Edinburgh Rugby	75	(35)
- Correct as of 22 May 2018

Neil Cochrane (born 4 January 1984 in Edinburgh) is a retired Scottish rugby union player. Cochrane played for Edinburgh Rugby from 2014 until his retirement at the end of the 2018 season having spent the early parts of his career in England. A former captain of the Scotland under 21s, he was known as a hard-hitting forward with plenty of pace and power.

== Background ==
When he was fifteen he took up rugby at Boroughmuir High School after his friends convinced him to play in their team. Cochrane initially played rugby union at centre before moving to flanker. Whilst playing for Boroughmuir he was spotted by the Under 16s State School Scotland Rugby Union Team, which led to an academy place with Edinburgh Rugby. In 2003 Cochrane was called up to the Scotland Under-21s, captaining the team between 2004 and 2005.

== Club career ==
=== Rotherham Titans ===
In 2005 he was offered his first professional contract by RFU Championship side the Rotherham Titans. During his three years at Rotherham, Cochrane made 83 appearances at flanker scoring 70 points and was voted player of the year in his final season for them.

=== Doncaster Knights ===
In 2008 Cochrane signed a full-time contract with the Doncaster Knights where once again supporters voted him Player of the Year in 2010. During his three years at the Knights, Cochrane made 75 appearances scoring 60 points.

=== Bedford Blues ===
Bedford Blues moved in to sign Cochrane from Doncaster Knights at the beginning of the 2011–12 RFU Championship where he changed from the position of flanker to hooker. Bedford Director of Rugby Mike Rayer said "We are delighted that he has agreed to join us next season, you only need to have seen Doncaster in action this season to realise how important a player Neil has been to the Knights."

Cochrane quickly established himself as the starting hooker for the Blues, who secured second position in the 2011–12 RFU Championship table with a win over Nottingham in the last game of the season. Whilst in preparations for the semifinals of the Championship playoffs against London Welsh Bedford agreed a new 12-month deal with Cochrane to continue playing in his new position for the 2012–13 Championship season.

=== London Wasps ===
On 3 May 2013, Cochrane leaves Bedford Blues for London Wasps, who compete in the Aviva Premiership for the 2013–14 season.

=== Edinburgh Rugby ===
On 27 January 2014, Cochrane returns to Scotland to rejoin with his hometown club Edinburgh Rugby for the 2014–15 season.

== International career ==
He was called up to the senior Scotland squad for the 2018 Six Nations Championship.
