= Jonathan Mills =

Welsh rugby player

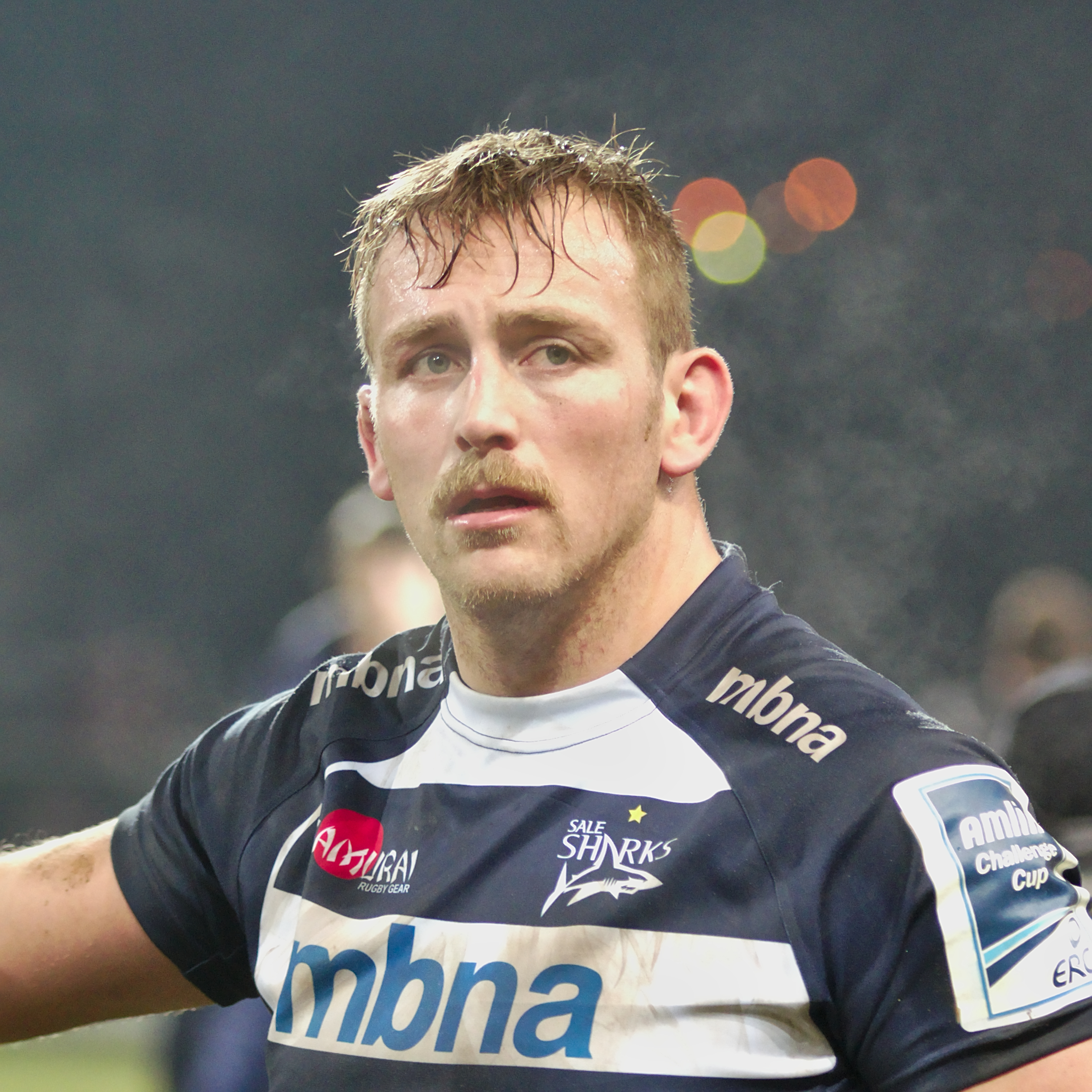
- Born: Jonathan Mills; 12 February 1984 (age 42) Wales
- Height: 195 cm (6 ft 5 in)
- Weight: 117 kg (18 st 6 lb)
- University: Colston Collegiate
- Occupation: Professional Rugby Player

Rugby union career
- Position: Second Row/Back Row
- Current team: London Scottish
Senior career
Years	Team	Apps	(Points)
2007–2013	London Welsh	143	(55)
2013–2017	Sale Sharks	107	(20)
- Correct as of 7 June 2017

Jonathan Mills (born 12 February 1984) is a Welsh rugby union player. A lock forward, he previously played for Llandovery RFC, Bath, Llanelli RFC and the Scarlets before joining London Welsh where he captained the side winning the RFU Championship. In June 2013 he joined Sale Sharks. In August 2017 Mills joined London Scottish as a player-coach until February 2018 where he will join the Dallas Griffins for the inaugural Major League Rugby season in the US as a player-coach.

Mills has represented Wales at under-16, under-18, under-19 and under-21 levels winning age group championships. He has also represented the Barbarians.
