= Jon Fisher (rugby union) =

English rugby union player

Jonathan Fisher
- Born: Jonathan Alexander Travers Fisher; 15 September 1988 (age 38) Kingston upon Thames, England
- Height: 1.96 m (6 ft 5 in)
- Weight: 115 kg (254 lb)
- School: Wellington College
- University: Birkbeck College

Rugby union career
- Position(s): Flanker, Number eight
Senior career
Years	Team	Apps	(Points)
2007–2011	London Irish	27	(0)
2011–2012	Bedford Blues	15	(0)
2012–2014	London Irish	21	(0)
2014–2016	Northampton Saints	28	(0)
2016–2017	Bristol Rugby	12	
International career
Years	Team	Apps	(Points)
2009	England Saxons	1	(0)
- Correct as of 14 April 2009
National sevens team
Years	Team		Comps
2008	England		1
Coaching career
- Years: Team
- 2017–2023: London Irish U18
- 2018–2019: England Rugby (Pathway Consultant)
- 2020–2021: London Irish (Forwards Coach)
- 2021–2023: London Irish (Assistant Coach)
- 2024–2026: Queensland Reds (Assistant Coach)
- 2026–: Australia (Assistant Coach)

Jonathan Fisher (born 15 September 1988) is an English rugby union coach and former professional player. Playing his entire career in the English Premiership, Fisher's position was around the Back-row, typically Flanker or No. 8.

== Early life and youth career ==
Fisher was educated at Wellington College in Crowthorne, Berkshire, where he played for the 1st XV that were eliminated in the Daily Mail Cup at the Semi-final stage in 2007. He also played at Lock in the side that got knocked out at the same stage a year earlier.

He was a member of the England Under-20 team that reached the final of the 2008 IRB Junior World Championship. He also played for the England Sevens team at the 2008 Hong Kong Sevens.

== Career ==
He made his club debut for London Irish as a substitute against the Ospreys on 4 November 2007, in the 2007–08 EDF Energy Cup. He also appeared in the Premiership as well as an appearance off the bench for the England Saxons against Portugal.

At the end of the 2010–11 Aviva Premiership, Fisher left London Irish to join the Bedford Blues in the Greene King IPA Championship. Where he stayed for a season and then re-joined London Irish for the 2012/13 season in the 2012–13 Aviva Premiership.

On 1 September 2014, Fisher signed for Northampton Saints from the 2014–15 season. After an impressive first season with Northampton Saints, Fisher was picked to represent England at Twickenham against the Barbarians.

== Coaching career ==
He left Bristol to take a coaching role with London Irish's academy in August 2017.

In late 2023 Fisher joined former head coach at London Irish, Les Kiss, at the Queensland Reds.

In August 2026, Fisher joined Les Kiss from the Reds to become the assistant coach of Australia.
