= James Hanks (rugby union) =

English rugby union player (born 1984)

- Born: 24 April 1984 (age 42) Sidcup, Kent, England
- Height: 1.98 m (6 ft 6 in)
- Weight: 111 kg (17 st 7 lb)
- School: Chislehurst And Sidcup Grammar School. Dulwich College

Rugby union career
- Position: Lock
Senior career
Years	Team	Apps	(Points)
2004 - 2014	Exeter Chiefs	192	(0)
International career
Years	Team	Apps	(Points)
2000	England u16s		

James Hanks (born 24 April 1984) is an English Former Rugby Union player who for played for Exeter Chiefs in the Aviva Premiership. He made his debut for Exeter Chiefs in 2005 against Cornish Pirates. He played As a Lock. He made 190 senior appearances for Exeter Chiefs and was named Players Player for the 2010/2011 season. He retired in 2014 after suffering a serious neck injury against Bath.
