= Ed Jackson (rugby union) =

English rugby union player (born 1988)

- Born: Edward Thomas Bentley Jackson; 2 December 1988 (age 37) Bath, England
- Height: 193 cm (6 ft 4 in)
- Weight: 110 kg (17 st 5 lb; 243 lb)
- School: Millfield School
- University: Northumbria University

Rugby union career
- Position: Number 8
- Current team: Newport Gwent Dragons
Senior career
Years	Team	Apps	(Points)
2007-2010	Bath		
2010-2011	Doncaster Knights	24	(15)
2011-2013	London Welsh	52	(70)
2013-2015	Wasps	16	(0)
2015-2017	NG Dragons	36	(10)
- Correct as of 18 February 2025

Edward Thomas Bentley Jackson (born 2 December 1988) is an English former professional rugby union player who played for a number of sides in England and Wales as a Number 8.

== Background ==
Born in Bath, Jackson attended Millfield School where he was captain of the 1st XV, coached by former Bath prop Jon Mallet. Upon graduation from the Bath Academy, starting his senior professional career at the Rec, the academy manager Frank Butler commented "Edward is an intelligent footballer who understands and reads the game very well. I first saw him play for Somerset U16s three years ago, and he has been training with the academy ever since. We have liaised closely with Jon Mallett in Edward's development, and are delighted to have signed him full-time."

== Club career ==
As one of the stars coming through Bath Academy where Jackson first gained experiences in the A League playing for Bath United, the ball carrier signed a full-time contract with Bath in 2007 and made his senior debut for them against Leicester Tigers in the EDF Energy Cup in October 2008. In 2009, he captained Bath at the Middlesex Sevens.

The backrow moved onto Doncaster Knights in the RFU Championship before making the move to London Welsh in 2012. Jackson then signed for Wasps Rugby (Aviva Premiership) in 2014 where he spent two seasons.

Having previously worked with Dragons Director of Rugby Lyn Jones during his time at London Welsh, Jackson signed for Newport Gwent Dragons and made his debut in the Pro12 match against Connacht in September 2015.

== International career ==
Jackson's leadership skills were recognised at international level in his early years, representing England he captained both U16 and U18 teams. He was part of the England U18 side that won the Four Nations title in 2006.

== Spinal injury ==
In April 2017, Jackson had a spinal injury, a fractured C6/C7 joint dislocation, after diving into the shallow end of a swimming pool. Despite the severity of the injury, Jackson is currently making a positive recovery progress, though he has been told that he will not play rugby professionally again. His previous rugby club Wasps paid tribute to the former Number Eight with standing ovation at the 8th minute during the Aviva Premiership match against Saracens.

== Post injury ==
In April 2018, less than a year after breaking his neck, Jackson climbed Snowdon. Jackson's created a not-for-profit organisation, M2M, standing for the millimetres he moved his big toe to the mountains he now climbs. He and former Bath club mate Olly Barkley, the former England international, and are committed to raising £250,000 for a spinal injury rehabilitation unit in Nepal. Alongside his wife, Lois, they founded a mental health charity, called Millimetres 2 Mountains (M2M), that helps people who have suffered physical and/or mental trauma through recovery utilising the outdoors and bespoke support.

In 2018, Jackson joined Channel 4 as a reporter for their European Rugby Champions Cup coverage and has also presented their highlights show 'The Big Tackle.' He been involved with their coverage of the Autumn Nations Cup, Autumn Nations Series and Irish Autumn Internationals and became a presenter of Channel 4 coverage of the Tokyo 2020 Paralympic Games & Beijing 2022 Winter Paralympic Games also for Channel 4.

During 2020, Jackson climbed Mera Peak in Nepal to raise funds for a spinal unit. He has become and adventurer, motivational speaker and television presenter.

The story of his injury, recovery and new-found love of mountaineering was made into a documentary 'The Mountain within me' in 2024 by director Polly Steele. The film had its World Première on 16 August 2024 at the 77th Edinburgh International Film Festival. Its UK release date is 23 August 2024

On 23 August 2025, Jackson became the first person to ascend a 4,720m-high peak in the Tien Shan range, Kyrgyzstan, raising funds for the Millimetres to Mountains charity.
