= Tom Slater (rugby union) =

Welsh rugby union player

Tom Slater (born 11 October 1986 (age 38)) is a Welsh rugby union footballer currently playing for Welsh Premier Division side Cardiff RFC. His position is at scrum-half.

He has previously played for Beddau RFC Coventry R.F.C. and Cardiff Blues before joining Bristol at the start of the 2011–12 season. He returned to Cardiff RFC for the start of the 2013–4 season.

Slater has also represented the Wales Sevens team in the IRB Sevens World Series and the Barbarians, becoming one of the youngest players to represent the club when selected to play for them in March 2008 at the age of 21.
