= Greg Bateman =

English rugby union player

- Born: Gregory Edwin Bateman; 20 June 1989 (age 37) Frimley, Surrey, England
- Height: 1.78 m (5 ft 10 in)
- Weight: 118 kg (18 st 8 lb)
- School: Cranleigh School, Surrey

Rugby union career
- Position(s): Loosehead Prop, Tighthead Prop, Hooker
Senior career
Years	Team	Apps	(Points)
2011	Dorking	5	(0)
2011–2013	London Welsh	46	(15)
2013–2015	Exeter Chiefs	17	(15)
2015–2020	Leicester Tigers	91	(35)
2020–2022	Dragons	22	(0)
2011–2022	Total	181	(65)
- Correct as of 13 October 2022

Gregory Edwin Bateman (born 20 June 1989) is a former English rugby union player. Bateman has previously played for the Dragons, Dorking, London Welsh, Exeter Chiefs and Leicester Tigers. He has played in all three front row positions, but primarily played as loosehead prop.

Bateman joined Exeter Chiefs from former Aviva Premiership side London Welsh for the 2013/14 season. Bateman is a former product of the Harlequins academy.

On 18 February it was announced that Bateman was due to join Leicester Tigers for the 2015/16 season. He left ahead of the 2020–21 season.

On 1 September 2020 it was confirmed he had signed for Pro14 side Dragons.

Bateman retired at the end of the 2021–2022 season.
