= Joe Ajuwa =

Nigerian-born rugby player

- Born: Joe Ajuwa; 25 January 1983 (age 43) Lagos, Nigeria
- Height: 1.87 m (6 ft 2 in)
- Weight: 110 kg (17 st 5 lb)
- University: Saint Mary's College, Twickenham, England

Rugby union career
- Position: Wing
Senior career
Years	Team	Apps	(Points)
2003–2007	Richmond		
2007–2008	London Welsh		
2008	Richmond		
2008–2009	Llanelli		
2009–2010	Llandovery ,	25	(55)
2010-	London Welsh		
2013-	Rosslyn Park(loan)		
- Correct as of 29 June 2010
Provincial / State sides
Years	Team	Apps	(Points)
2009–2010	Scarlets	8	(0)
- Correct as of 29 June 2010

Joe Ajuwa (born 25 January 1983) is a rugby union player currently playing for London Welsh. Ajuwa was born in Lagos, Nigeria and moved to the UK with his family (which includes nine brothers and three sisters) in 1994. He first played rugby at school in Bath then played for English students while he was at university. His childhood rugby hero was Jonah Lomu. Brothers Daniel and Shadrack Ajuwa have played for Bristol RFC.

Described as being a strong and powerful winger, Ajuwa has had previously had spells with London Welsh RFC and Richmond RFC. During the 2009–2010 season, Ajuwa played 25 games for Llandovery scored an impressive 11 tries. He also broke into the Scarlets team that season, first appearing against Ulster in the Celtic League.

On 15 June 2010, Ajuwa signed a professional development contract with the Scarlets. Ajuwa was awarded his contract after being nominated as Principality Player of the Year by the Welsh Rugby Union for his performances with Llandovery RFC. Ajuwa said he was eager to get fully immersed into the senior Scarlets squad and looking forward to the challenge. He continued to add, He said: "I'm really pleased to be signed up with the Scarlets now full-time and just look forward to the challenge ahead and working hard in pre-season to get myself in great shape. I know I need to work on the finer points of my game and I'm looking forward to being part of the Scarlets squad next season.

"Although I had some time with them last season, I'm new to the Scarlets mix and have plenty to learn from the guys around me – from simple things like the game language and team culture to the technical dynamics within the Scarlets environment. It's a great set-up, a really good bunch of guys and there's a good atmosphere within the squad. I'm really looking forward to be part of that next season and I'm eager to impress so will be do all I can to learn quickly."

"I've been enjoying my time in this part of the world, the Scarlets have great supporters who are really passionate about their rugby and I've been made to feel really welcome."

Ajuwa is currently playing for English Championship side London Welsh. Joe Ajuwa is currently on a short-term loan to Rosslyn Park.
