= Hudson Tongaʻuiha =

Tonga dual-code rugby international footballer

Personal information
- Full name: Kosilio Tonga'uiha
- Born: 16 November 1983 (age 41); Tofua, Tonga
- Height: 5 ft 11 in (1.80 m)
- Weight: 187 lb (85 kg)

Playing information

Rugby league
Representative
Years	Team	Pld	T	G	FG	P
2006	Tonga

Rugby union
- Position: Centre, Fullback
Club
Years	Team	Pld	T	G	FG	P
2007–08	RCA Cergy-Pontoise	10				5
2010–14	London Welsh	54				95
	Doncaster Knights
	Total	64	0	0	0	100
Representative
Years	Team	Pld	T	G	FG	P
2005–09	Tonga	24				30
- As of 30 December 2011

Hudson Tonga'uiha born as Kosilio Tonga'uiha (born 16 November 1983 in Tofua) is a Tongan rugby footballer. He plays for London Welsh as a centre or fullback.

== Rugby league ==
In 2006 he represented the Tonga national rugby league team at the 2006 Pacific Cup.

== Rugby union ==
He was a member of Tonga squad at the 2007 Rugby World Cup, but he only played at the 20–36 defeat by England.

Tonga'uiha plays previously played for the Doncaster Knights.
