= Dan George (rugby union) =

Welsh rugby union player

- Born: Dan George; 10 August 1986 (age 40) Wales
- Height: 185 cm (6 ft 1 in)
- Weight: 108 kg (17 st 0 lb)

Rugby union career
Senior career
Years	Team	Apps	(Points)
2008-2013	London Welsh	92	(25)
2013-2014	Gloucester Rugby	13	(0)
2014-2016	Worcester Warriors	22	(10)
2016	Blackheath		
–	Old Albanian RFC		

Dan George (born 10 August 1986) is a Welsh rugby union player. After beginning his career in the back row, he moved to hooker where he represented Wales at under-16, under-18, under-19 and under-21 levels. He played for Llanelli RFC and the Scarlets before joining London Welsh in 2008.

On 28 June 2013, following London Welsh's relegation to the RFU Championship, George left the club to join Gloucester Rugby in the Premiership on a one-year deal for the 2013–14 season. On 29 April 2014, George joined local rivals Worcester Warriors in the RFU Championship for the 2014–15 season.

After two years at Worcester, George left to seek work in London and played for Blackheath. Christmas of 2017 saw a move back to the professional game with Bedford Blues, after six months a move to London Scottish developed as a player-coach overseeing the forwards.
