= 2010–11 Cornish Pirates season =

2010–11 Cornish Pirates Rugby season
- Nickname: The Pirates
- Founded: 1945
- Location: Penzance, Cornwall
- Ground: Mennaye Field (Capacity: 3500)
- Coach(es): Chris Stirling, Harvey Biljon and Ian Davies
- Captain: Gavan Cattle
- Top scorer: 366 (England) Rob Cook (League only)
- Most tries: 12 (England) Phil Burgess (League only)
- League: RFU Championship
- 2010–11: Third and Finalists

Official website
- cornish-pirates.com

The 2010–11 season is the Cornish Pirates eighth season in the second tier of the English rugby union league system, the RFU Championship and their second in the British and Irish Cup.

== Pre–season friendlies ==
	Date	Opponents	H / A	Result	Score	Attendance	Ref
1	14 August	Gwent Dragons	H	L	11 – 27	2110	
2	22 August	Exeter Chiefs	A	L	14 – 22	2280	
3	5 March	Exeter Chiefs XV	H	W	43 – 19	990	

== RFU Championship ==
=== Stage one matches ===
Stage one is a league programme of 22 matches starting on Saturday 4 September 2010 and completed by Saturday 19 February 2011. Each team play 11 matches at home and 11 away with the top eight teams qualifying for the promotion play–offs and bottom four play in the relegation play–off.

	Date	Opponents	H / A	Result	Score	Attendance	Ref
1	29 August	Doncaster Knights	H	W	30 – 14	2232	
2	5 September	London Welsh	H	W	22 – 3	2047	
3	11 September	Moseley	A	D	26 – 26	751	
4	19 September	Birmingham & Solihull	H	W	32 – 15	1672	
5	26 September	Bristol	A	L	7 – 21	4379	
6	3 October	Plymouth Albion	H	W	46 – 13	2439	
7	9 October	Bedford	A	L	25 – 32	3243	
8	17 October	Rotherham Titans	H	W	40 – 15	1982	
9	22 October	Worcester Warriors	A	W	23 – 21	6928	
10	31 October	Esher	H	W	54 – 6	1767	
11	7 November	Nottingham	A	W	36 – 10	1637	
12	14 November	London Welsh	A	L	16 – 23	1250	
13	21 November	Moseley	H	W	50 – 7	1854	
	28 November	Birmingham & Solihull	A		P – P		
14	5 December	Bristol	H	W	16 – 6	2253	
15	15 December	Birmingham & Solihull	A	W	61 – 28	407	
	26 December	Plymouth Albion	A		P – P		
16	2 January	Bedford Blues	H	W	23 – 13	3051	
17	8 January	Rotherham Titans	A	L	18 – 19	1067	
18	12 January	Plymouth Albion	A	W	10 – 6	2512	
19	30 January	Worcester Warriors	H	L	30 – 33	1976	
20	5 February	Esher	A	L	12 – 13	1338	
21	13 February	Nottingham	H	W	40 – 0	2486	
22	19 February	Doncaster Knights	A	W	16 – 13	1091	

=== Stage one league table ===
2010–11 RFU Championship table
Pos	Team	Pld	W	D	L	PF	PA	PD	BP	Pts	Qualification
1	Worcester Warriors (P)	22	21	0	1	770	382	+388	17	101	Promotion playoff
2	Bedford Blues (S)	22	17	0	5	662	375	+287	14	82	Promotion playoff
3	Cornish Pirates (F)	22	15	1	6	633	337	+296	14	76	Promotion playoff
4	London Welsh (S)	22	14	0	8	575	429	+146	12	68	Promotion playoff
5	Nottingham	22	12	0	10	647	556	+91	16	64	Promotion playoff
6	Doncaster Knights	22	9	0	13	572	576	−4	15	51	Promotion playoff
7	Rotherham Titans	22	10	0	12	435	553	−118	7	47	Promotion playoff
8	Bristol	22	8	1	13	468	540	−72	7	41	Promotion playoff
9	Esher	22	7	1	14	406	651	−245	8	38	Relegation playoff
10	Plymouth Albion	22	6	2	14	365	500	−135	8	36	Relegation playoff
11	Moseley	22	5	3	14	382	667	−285	3	29	Relegation playoff
12	Birmingham & Solihull (R)	22	4	0	18	397	746	−349	6	22	Relegation playoff

Rules for classification: If teams are level at any stage, tiebreakers are applied in the following order:
1. Number of matches won
2. Difference between points for and against
3. Total number of points for
4. Aggregate number of points scored in matches between tied teams
5. Number of matches won excluding the first match, then the second and so on until the tie is settled
  (F) Promotion play-off finals; (P) Promoted; (R) Relegated; (S) Promotion play-off semi-finals

=== Stage two matches ===
Stage two was a programme of six matches starting on Saturday 12 March 2011 and completed by Saturday 16 April 2011. Each team played three matches at home and three away with the top two teams from each group qualifying for the semi–finals.

	Date	Opponents	H / A	Result	Score	Attendance	Ref
1	13 March	Doncaster Knights	H	W	33 – 25	2185	
2	20 March	Bedford Blues	A	W	31 – 18	2725	
3	27 March	Rotherham Titans	H	W	64 – 17	2285	
4	2 April	Rotherham Titans	A	W	24 – 16	1026	
5	10 April	Bedford Blues	H	W	33 – 22	2985	
6	16 April	Doncaster Knights	A	W	27 – 24	1173	

=== Stage two league table ===
Pos	Team	Pld	W	D	L	PF	PA	PD	B	+	Pts
1	Cornish Pirates	6	6	0	0	215	119	+96	3	2	29
2	Bedford Blues	6	3	0	3	226	147	+79	4	3	19
3	Doncaster Knights	6	3	0	3	181	154	+27	5	1	18
4	Rotherham Titans	6	0	0	6	110	312	−202	1	0	1

=== Semi-finals ===
1 May 2011
17:45

Cornish Pirates (England)	18 - 10	(England) London Welsh
Try: Cattle 62'c, McAtee 76'm Con: Cook (1/2); Pen: Cook 12', 69' (2)	Report	Try: Corker 16'c Con: Ross (1/1); Pen: Ross 9' (1)

Mennaye Field, Penzance
Attendance: 3,001
Referee: David Rose

FB	15	(England) Rob Cook
RW	14	(South Africa) Nick Jackson
OC	13	(England) Matt Hopper
IC	12	(England) Tom Luke	(substituted off) 60'
LW	11	(Wales) Rhodri McAtee
FH	10	(New Zealand) Johnny Bentley
SH	9	(Wales) Gavin Cattle (c)
N8	8	(New Zealand) Laurie McGlone
OF	7	(England) Sam Betty		(yellow card) 10' to 20' (substituted off) 51'
BF	6	(England) Chris Morgan
RL	5	(England) Ben Gulliver	(substituted off) 60'
LL	4	(England) Mike Myerscough
TP	3	(England) Alan Paver	(substituted off) 45'
HK	2	(England) Dave Ward	(substituted off) 58'
LP	1	(England) Paul Andrew
Replacements:
PR	16	(England) Carl Rimmer	(substituted in) 45'
HK	17	(Germany) Rob Elloway	(substituted in) 58'
FL	18	(England) Phil Burgess	(substituted in) 51'
N8	19	(England) Kyle Marriott	(substituted in) 60'
CE	20	(Wales) Steve Winn
CE	21	(England) Drew Locke	(substituted in) 60'
SH	22	(England) James Doherty
	Coach: (New Zealand) Chris Stirling

FB	15	(Wales) Aled Thomas	(substituted off) 56'
RW	14	(England) Liam Gibson
OC	13	(Tonga) Hudson Tongaʻuiha
IC	12	(England) Simon Whatling
LW	11	(South Africa) Errie Claassens	(substituted off) 40'
FH	10	(Scotland) Gordon Ross
SH	9	(Wales) Robert Lewis	(substituted off) 68'
N8	8	(England) Ben Russell	(substituted off) 47' (substituted in) 55' (substituted off) 58'
OF	7	(England) Michael Hills
BF	6	(Wales) Jonathan Mills (c)
RL	5	(England) Matt Corker
LL	4	(Wales) Mike Powell	(substituted off) 51'
TP	3	(South Africa) Lorne Ward
HK	2	(Tonga) Viliami Ma'asi	(substituted off) 78'
LP	1	(United States) Shawn Pittman	(yellow card) 45' to 55'
Replacements:
HK	16	(Wales) Saul Nelson	(substituted in) 78'
PR	17	(England) Max Lahiff	(substituted in) 47' (substituted off) 55'
LK	18	(England) Martin Purdy	(substituted in) 51'
N8	19	(Wales) Lee Beach	(substituted in) 58'
SH	20	(England) Ben Stevenson	(substituted in) 68'
CE	20	(England) Dominic Shabbo	(substituted in) 56'
WG	22	(England) Marland Yarde	(substituted in) 40'
Coach: (England) Phil Greening

Touch judges:
(England) Steve Leyshon
(England) Peter Parker-Sedgemore
Television match official:
(England) Geoff Warren

=== Final ===
11 May 2011
19:45

Cornish Pirates (England)	12 - 21	(England) Worcester Warriors
Pen: Cook 21', 38', 57', 69' (4)	Report	Try: Benjamin 5'm, Goode 30'c Con: Goode (1/2); Pen: Goode 18', 39', 54' (3)

Mennaye Field, Penzance
Attendance: 3,500
Referee: Martin Fox

FB	15	(England) Rob Cook
RW	14	(Wales) Wes Davies	(substituted off) 63'
OC	13	(England) Matt Hopper
IC	12	(England) Tom Luke	(substituted off) 54'
LW	11	(Wales) Rhodri McAtee
FH	10	(New Zealand) Johnny Bentley
SH	9	(Wales) Gavin Cattle (c)
N8	8	(New Zealand) Laurie McGlone	(substituted off) 69'
OF	7	(England) Phil Burgess
BF	6	(England) Chris Morgan
RL	5	(England) Mike Myerscough
LL	4	(Scotland) Ian Nimmo
TP	3	(England) Alan Paver	(substituted off) 69'
HK	2	(England) Dave Ward	(substituted off) 75'
LP	1	(England) Paul Andrew	(substituted off) 63'
Replacements:
PR	16	(England) Ryan Storer	(substituted in) 63'
HK	17	(Germany) Rob Elloway	(substituted in) 63'
PR	18	(England) Carl Rimmer	(substituted in) 69'
FL	19	(South Africa) Tyrone Holmes	(substituted in) 75'
N8	20	(England) Kyle Marriott	(substituted in) 69'
CE	21	(England) Drew Locke	(substituted in) 54'
SH	22	(England) James Doherty
	Coach: (New Zealand) Chris Stirling

FB	15	(England) Chris Pennell (c)
RW	14	(England) Marcel Garvey
OC	13	(England) Alex Crockett	(substituted off) 57'
IC	12	(Samoa) Dale Rasmussen
LW	11	(England) Miles Benjamin
FH	10	(England) Andy Goode	(substituted off) 75'
SH	9	(England) Jonny Arr
N8	8	(England) Kai Horstmann
OF	7	(England) Jake Abbott
BF	6	(Ireland) Neil Best	(yellow card) 56' to 66'	(substituted off) 66'
RL	5	(England) Craig Gillies
LL	4	(New Zealand) Greg Rawlinson	(substituted off) 61'
TP	3	(Tonga) Tevita Taumoepeau	(substituted off) 61'
HK	2	(England) Chris Fortey	(substituted off) 54'
LP	1	(England) Adam Black
Replacements:
HK	16	(Tonga) Aleki Lutui	(substituted in) 54'
PR	17	(Scotland) Bruce Douglas	(substituted in) 61'
LK	18	(England) Graham Kitchener	(substituted in) 61'
N8	19	(England) Adam Balding	(substituted in) 66'
SH	20	(England) Ollie Frost
FH	21	(England) Joe Carlisle	(substituted in) 75'
CE	22	(Scotland) Alex Grove	(substituted in) 57'
Coach: (England) Richard Hill

Touch judges:
(England) Gareth Copsey
(England) Chris Sharp
Television match official:
(England) Steve Leyshon

18 May 2011
19:45

Worcester Warriors (England)	25 - 20	(England) Cornish Pirates
Try: Garvey 12'c, Benjamin 43'c, Goode 46'm Con: Goode (2/3); Pen: Goode 6' (1); Drop: Goode 21' (1)	Report	Try: Locke 53'c, Penalty try 74'c Con: Cook (2/2); Pen: Cook 2', 35' (2)

Sixways Stadium, Worcester
Attendance: 12,024
Referee: JP Doyle

FB	15	(England) Chris Pennell (c)
RW	14	(England) Marcel Garvey	(substituted off) 79'
OC	13	(Scotland) Alex Grove
IC	12	(Samoa) Dale Rasmussen	(substituted off) 70'
LW	11	(England) Miles Benjamin
FH	10	(England) Andy Goode	(substituted off) 70'
SH	9	(England) Jonny Arr
N8	8	(England) Kai Horstmann
OF	7	(England) Jake Abbott
BF	6	(Ireland) Neil Best	(yellow card) 72' to 80'
RL	5	(England) Craig Gillies
LL	4	(New Zealand) Greg Rawlinson	(substituted off) 70'
TP	3	(Tonga) Tevita Taumoepeau	(substituted off) 75'
HK	2	(England) Chris Fortey	(substituted off) 33'
LP	1	(England) Adam Black
Replacements:
HK	16	(Tonga) Aleki Lutui	(substituted in) 33'
PR	17	(Scotland) Bruce Douglas	(substituted in) 75'
LK	18	(England) Graham Kitchener	(substituted in) 70'
N8	19	(England) Adam Balding
SH	20	(England) Ollie Frost	(substituted in) 79'
FH	21	(England) Joe Carlisle	(substituted in) 70'
CE	22	(England) Alex Crockett	(substituted in) 70'
	Coach: (England) Richard Hill

FB	15	(England) Rob Cook
RW	14	(South Africa) Nick Jackson
OC	13	(England) Matt Hopper
IC	12	(England) Drew Locke
LW	11	(Wales) Rhodri McAtee	(substituted off) 40'
FH	10	(New Zealand) Johnny Bentley
SH	9	(Wales) Gavin Cattle (c)	(substituted off) 62'
N8	8	(England) Kyle Marriott
OF	7	(England) Phil Burgess	(substituted off) 50'
BF	6	(England) Chris Morgan
RL	5	(England) Mike Myerscough
LL	4	(New Zealand) Laurie McGlone	(substituted off) 58'
TP	3	(England) Carl Rimmer	(substituted off) 62'
HK	2	(Germany) Rob Elloway	(substituted off) 58'
LP	1	(England) Ryan Storer	(substituted off) 58'
Replacements:
PR	16	(England) Paul Andrew	(substituted in) 58'
HK	17	(England) Dave Ward	(substituted in) 58'
PR	18	(England) Alan Paver	(substituted in) 62'
LK	19	(Scotland) Ian Nimmo	(substituted in) 58'
FL	20	(England) Sam Betty	(substituted in) 50'
CE	21	(England) Tom Luke	(substituted in) 40'
SH	22	(England) James Doherty	(substituted in) 62'
Coach: (New Zealand) Chris Stirling

Touch judges:
(England) Gareth Copsey
(England) Chris Sharp
Television match official:
(England) Steve Leyshon

== British and Irish Cup ==
=== Pool A matches ===
	Date	Opponents	H / A	Result	Score	Attendance	Ref
1	11 December	Currie	H	W	54–31	923	
2	19 December	Leinster A	H	W	43–12	2026	
3	16 January	Plymouth Albion	H	W	34–3	2207	
4	21 January	Newport	A	L	32–34	697	
5	26 February	Worcester Warriors	A	L	12–28	4042	

- Match v Currie was originally due to be played at Malleny Park, Currie but moved to the Mennaye because of the freezing weather in Scotland.

=== Pool A table ===
Pos	Team	Pld	W	D	L	PF	PA	PD	T	TB	LB	Pts
1	(England) Worcester Warriors	5	4	0	1	175	87	+88	22	3	0	19
2	(Ireland) Leinster A	5	4	0	1	138	117	+21	18	3	0	19
3	(England) Cornish Pirates	5	3	0	2	175	108	+67	23	4	1	17
4	(Wales) Newport	5	3	0	2	121	159	−38	16	3	1	16
5	(England) Plymouth Albion	5	1	0	4	76	144	−68	9	1	0	5
6	(Scotland) Currie	5	0	0	5	104	174	−70	11	0	2	2

Rules for classification:
- 4 points for a win
- 2 points for a draw
- 1 bonus point for a loss by seven points or less
- 1 bonus point for scoring four or more tries in a match

== Coaching staff ==
- High Performance Manager - Chris Stirling
- Forwards coach – Ian Davies
- Backs coach – Harvey Biljon
- Strength and conditioning coach – Simon Raynes

== See also ==
- 2011–12 Cornish Pirates RFC season
