= 2010–11 RFU Championship =

- Countries: England
- Champions: Worcester Warriors
- Runners-up: Cornish Pirates
- Relegated: Birmingham & Solihull
- Attendance: 378,950 (average 2,216 per match) (Note: Note that 1 home attendance is missing (see below) - so the total attendance will not be 100% accurate. The average attendance has also been taken into account with the missing games not included.)
- Highest attendance: 12,024 Worcester Warriors at home to Cornish Pirates on 18 May 2011
- Lowest attendance: 317 Birmingham & Solihull at home to Doncaster Knights on 9 January 2011
- Top point scorer: (England) Andy Goode (Worcester Warriors) 381 points
- Top try scorer: (England) Miles Benjamin (Worcester Warriors) 26 tries

The 2010–11 RFU Championship was the 2nd season (of the professionalised format) of the second division of the English domestic rugby union competitions, played between August 2010 and May 2011. New teams to the division included Worcester Warriors who were relegated from the Guinness Premiership 2009–10 and Esher who were promoted from the 2009–10 National League 1. The league maintained the three stage system with the league including promotion/relegation pools and playoffs to determine the champion and promoted team.

Worcester Warriors topped the regular season league table, their play-off group table and then won the Championship after they defeated Cornish Pirates over two legs in the Championship final at Sixways Stadium (46–32) on 18 May 2011 to make an instant return to the Premiership. Birmingham & Solihull were relegated to the 2011–12 National League 1 at the end of this season.

== Participating teams ==
Locations of the 2010–11 RFU Championship teams

Team	Stadium	Capacity	City/Area
Bedford Blues	Goldington Road	5,000 (1,700 seats)	Bedford, Bedfordshire
Birmingham & Solihull	Damson Park; Sharmans Cross	3,050; 3,500 (1,000 seats)	Solihull, West Midlands
Bristol	Memorial Stadium	12,100	Bristol
Cornish Pirates	Mennaye Field	4,000 (2,200 seats)	Penzance
Doncaster Knights	Castle Park	3,075	Doncaster
Esher	Molesey Road	3,000	Hersham, Surrey
London Welsh	Old Deer Park	5,850 (1,000 seats)	Richmond, London
Moseley	Billesley Common	3,000+	Birmingham
Nottingham	Meadow Lane	19,588	Nottingham
Plymouth Albion	The Brickfields	6,500	Plymouth
Rotherham Titans	Clifton Lane	2,500	Rotherham
Worcester Warriors	Sixways Stadium	12,088	Worcester

== Stage 1 league table ==
2010–11 RFU Championship table
Pos	Team	Pld	W	D	L	PF	PA	PD	BP	Pts	Qualification
1	Worcester Warriors (P)	22	21	0	1	770	382	+388	17	101	Promotion playoff
2	Bedford Blues (S)	22	17	0	5	662	375	+287	14	82	Promotion playoff
3	Cornish Pirates (F)	22	15	1	6	633	337	+296	14	76	Promotion playoff
4	London Welsh (S)	22	14	0	8	575	429	+146	12	68	Promotion playoff
5	Nottingham	22	12	0	10	647	556	+91	16	64	Promotion playoff
6	Doncaster Knights	22	9	0	13	572	576	−4	15	51	Promotion playoff
7	Rotherham Titans	22	10	0	12	435	553	−118	7	47	Promotion playoff
8	Bristol	22	8	1	13	468	540	−72	7	41	Promotion playoff
9	Esher	22	7	1	14	406	651	−245	8	38	Relegation playoff
10	Plymouth Albion	22	6	2	14	365	500	−135	8	36	Relegation playoff
11	Moseley	22	5	3	14	382	667	−285	3	29	Relegation playoff
12	Birmingham & Solihull (R)	22	4	0	18	397	746	−349	6	22	Relegation playoff

Rules for classification: If teams are level at any stage, tiebreakers are applied in the following order:
1. Number of matches won
2. Difference between points for and against
3. Total number of points for
4. Aggregate number of points scored in matches between tied teams
5. Number of matches won excluding the first match, then the second and so on until the tie is settled
  (F) Promotion play-off finals; (P) Promoted; (R) Relegated; (S) Promotion play-off semi-finals

== Results ==
=== Round 1 ===
28 August 2010
15:00

(BP) Bedford Blues	51 - 3	Plymouth Albion
	Report

Goldington Road
Attendance: 2,447
Referee: Dean Richards

28 August 2010

Moseley	17 - 29	Esher
	Report

Billesley
Attendance: 675
Referee: Chris Sharp

28 August 2010
15:00

(BP) Worcester Warriors	48 - 3	Birmingham & Solihull
	Report

Sixways
Attendance: 6,543
Referee: Keith Lewis

29 August 2010

(BP) Bristol	24 - 26	Rotherham Titans
	Report

Memorial Stadium
Attendance: 4,064
Referee: Rowan Kitt

29 August 2010

(BP) Nottingham	21 - 27	London Welsh (BP)
	Report

Meadow Lane
Attendance: 1,022
Referee: Rob Debney

29 August 2010

(BP) Cornish Pirates	30 - 14	Doncaster Knights
	Report

Mennaye Field
Attendance: 2,232
Referee: JP Boyle

=== Round 2 ===
4 September 2010
15:00

(BP) Plymouth Albion	19 - 26	Worcester Warriors
	Report

Brickfields
Attendance: 2,985
Referee: David Rose

4 September 2010

Esher	29 - 27	Bristol (BP)
	Report

Molesey Road
Attendance: 1,674
Referee: Sean Davey

4 September 2010

(BP) Doncaster Knights	16 - 23	Moseley
	Report

Castle Park
Attendance: 1,221

5 September 2010

Rotherham Titans	19 - 16	Bedford Blues (BP)
	Report

Clifton Lane
Attendance: 1,921
Referee: Tim Wigglesworth

5 September 2010

Birmingham & Solihull	28 - 41	Nottingham (BP)
	Report

Damson Park
Attendance: 672
Referee: Chris Sharp

5 September 2010
15:00

Cornish Pirates	22 - 3	London Welsh
	Report

Mennaye Field
Attendance: 2,047
Referee: Rowan Kitt

=== Round 3 ===
11 September 2010
15:00

(BP) Bedford Blues	31 - 9	Esher
	Report

Goldington Road
Attendance: 2,298
Referee: Llyr Apgeraint-Roberts

11 September 2010

(BP) London Welsh	33 - 9	Birmingham & Solihull
	Report

Old Deer Park
Attendance: 890
Referee: Luke Pearce

11 September 2010

(BP) Moseley	26 - 26	Cornish Pirates
	Report

Billesley
Attendance: 751
Referee: Darren Gamage

11 September 2010
15:00

Worcester Warriors	32 - 25	Rotherham Titans (BP)
	Report

Sixways
Attendance: 5,765
Referee: Andrew Taylorson

12 September 2010
15:00

(BP) Nottingham	37 - 16	Plymouth Albion
	Report

Meadow Lane
Attendance: 2,349
Referee: Michael Tutty

12 September 2010
15:00

Bristol	12 - 26	Doncaster Knights
	Report

Memorial Stadium
Attendance: 3,663
Referee: Rob Debney

=== Round 4 ===
18 September 2010

(BP) Doncaster Knights	24 - 29	Bedford Blues
	Report

Castle Park
Attendance: 1,022
Referee: Luke Pearce

18 September 2010

Esher	3 - 48	Worcester Warriors (BP)
	Report

Molesey Road
Attendance: 2,500
Referee: Tim Wigglesworth

18 September 2010

Moseley	13 - 13	Bristol
	Report

Billesley
Attendance: 729
Referee: Andrew Taylorson

18 September 2010

Plymouth Albion	10 - 21	London Welsh
	Report

Brickfields
Attendance: 2,010
Referee: Darren Gamage

18 September 2010

(BP) Rotherham Titans	37 - 31	Nottingham (BP)
	Report

Clifton Lane
Attendance: 1,752
Referee: Llyr Apgeraint-Roberts

19 September 2010

(BP) Cornish Pirates	32 - 15	Birmingham & Solihull
	Report

Mennaye Field
Attendance: 1,773
Referee: Michael Tutty

=== Round 5 ===
24 September 2010

(BP) Nottingham	40 - 13	Esher
	Report

Meadow Lane
Attendance: 1,244
Referee: Terry Hall

25 September 2010

(BP) Bedford Blues	41 - 12	Moseley
	Report

Goldington Road
Attendance: 3,018
Referee: Steve Lee

25 September 2010

(BP) London Welsh	39 - 10	Rotherham Titans
	Report

Old Deer Park
Attendance: 1,140
Referee: Greg Garner

25 September 2010
15:00

(BP) Worcester Warriors	30 - 28	Doncaster Knights (BP)
	Report

Sixways
Attendance: 5,753
Referee: Rowan Kitt

26 September 2010

Bristol	21 - 7	Cornish Pirates
	Report

Memorial Stadium
Attendance: 4,379
Referee: David Rose

26 September 2010

Birmingham & Solihull	18 - 36	Plymouth Albion
	Report

Damson Park
Attendance: 587
Referee: Tim Wigglesworth

=== Round 6 ===
1 October 2010

Esher	22 - 19	London Welsh (BP)
	Report

Molesey Road
Attendance: 2,180
Referee: Martin Fox

2 October 2010

(BP) Rotherham Titans	32 - 14	Birmingham & Solihull
	Report

Clifton Lane
Attendance: 1,457
Referee: Steve Lee

2 October 2010
15:00

Moseley	18 - 37	Worcester Warriors (BP)
	Report

Billesley
Attendance: 998
Referee: Terry Hall

2 October 2010

(BP) Doncaster Knights	46 - 42	Nottingham (BP)
	Report

Castle Park
Attendance: 1,231
Referee: Tim Wigglesworth

3 October 2010

(BP) Bristol	16 - 23	Bedford Blues
	Report

Memorial Stadium
Attendance: 3,946
Referee: Dean Richards

3 October 2010

(BP) Cornish Pirates	46 - 13	Plymouth Albion
	Report

Mennaye Field
Attendance: 2,696
Referee: Paul Knowles

=== Round 7 ===
8 October 2010
20:00

(BP) Worcester Warriors	38 - 20	Bristol
	Report

Sixways
Attendance: 7,474
Referee: Llyr Apgeraint-Roberts

9 October 2010

Plymouth Albion	21 - 10	Rotherham Titans
	Report

Brickfields
Attendance: 2,056
Referee: Keith Lewis

9 October 2010

(BP) London Welsh	29 - 24	Doncaster Knights (BP)
	Report

Old Deer Park
Attendance: 920
Referee: Michael Tutty

9 October 2010

Bedford Blues	32 - 25	Cornish Pirates (BP)
	Report

Goldington Road
Attendance: 3,243
Referee: Martin Fox

10 October 2010

(BP) Birmingham & Solihull	38 - 16	Esher
	Report

Damson Park
Attendance: 429
Referee: David Rose

10 October 2010

(BP) Nottingham	40 - 15	Moseley
	Report

Meadow Lane
Attendance: 1,547
Referee: Andrew Taylorson

=== Round 8 ===
16 October 2010

Moseley	22 - 68	London Welsh (BP)
	Report

Billesley
Attendance: 782
Referee: Darren Gamage

16 October 2010

Esher	10 - 10	Plymouth Albion
	Report

Molesey Road
Attendance: 1,152
Referee: Michael Tutty

16 October 2010

(BP) Doncaster Knights	33 - 14	Birmingham & Solihull
	Report

Castle Park
Attendance: 1,193
Referee: Paul Knowles

16 October 2010
15:00

Bedford Blues	18 - 28	Worcester Warriors
	Report

Goldington Road
Attendance: 1,965
Referee: Keith Lewis

17 October 2010

(BP) Bristol	32 - 28	Nottingham (BP)
	Report

Memorial Stadium
Attendance: 4,080
Referee: Chris White

17 October 2010

(BP) Cornish Pirates	40 - 15	Rotherham Titans
	Report

Mennaye Field
Attendance: 1,938
Referee: Dean Richards

=== Round 9 ===
21 October 2010
20:00

(BP) Worcester Warriors	21 - 23	Cornish Pirates
	Report

Sixways
Attendance: 6,938
Referee: Paul Knowles

21 October 2010

(BP) Birmingham & Solihull	20 - 22	Moseley
	Report

Sharmans Cross
Attendance: 1,062
Referee: Llyr Apgeraint-Roberts

22 October 2010

Rotherham Titans	25 - 22	Esher (BP)
	Report

Clifton Lane
Attendance: 1,197
Referee: Darren Gamage

22 October 2010

Plymouth Albion	3 - 41	Doncaster Knights (BP)
	Report

Brickfields
Attendance: 1,798
Referee: Keith Lewis

22 October 2010

(BP) London Welsh	39 - 14	Bristol
	Report

Old Deer Park
Attendance: 1,940
Referee: Luke Pearce

23 October 2010

Nottingham	13 - 24	Bedford Blues
	Report

Meadow Lane
Attendance: 1,623
Referee: Graham Knox

=== Round 10 ===
29 October 2010

Bedford Blues	19 - 16	London Welsh (BP)
	Report

Goldington Road
Attendance: 3,548
Referee: Llyr Apgeraint-Roberts

29 October 2010
20:00

(BP) Worcester Warriors	35 - 28	Nottingham (BP)
	Report

Sixways
Attendance: 6,736
Referee: Terry Hall

30 October 2010

Doncaster Knights	26 - 13	Rotherham Titans
	Report

Castle Park
Attendance: 1,830

30 October 2010

Moseley	22 - 36	Plymouth Albion (BP)
	Report

Billesley
Attendance: 879
Referee: Chris White

31 October 2010

(BP) Bristol	33 - 35	Birmingham & Solihull (BP)
	Report

Memorial Stadium
Attendance: 4,429
Referee: Steve Lee

31 October 2010

(BP) Cornish Pirates	54 - 6	Esher
	Report

Mennaye Field
Attendance: 1,737
Referee: Luke Pearce

=== Round 11 ===
5 November 2010

(BP) Plymouth Albion	19 - 20	Bristol
	Report

Brickfields
Attendance: 4,847
Referee: Terry Hall

6 November 2010
15:00

Rotherham Titans	28 - 17	Moseley
	Report

Clifton Lane
Attendance: 1,112
Referee: Martin Fox

7 November 2010
14:00

(BP) London Welsh	29 - 33	Worcester Warriors
	Report

Old Deer Park
Attendance: 1,725
Referee: Andrew Small

7 November 2010
15:00

Birmingham & Solihull	18 - 31	Bedford Blues (BP)
	Report

Damson Park
Attendance: 627
Referee: Michael Tutty

7 November 2010
15:00

(2BP) Esher	34 - 38	Doncaster Knights (BP)
	Report

Molesey Road
Attendance: 1,246
Referee: Steve Lee

7 November 2010
15:00

Nottingham	10 - 36	Cornish Pirates
	Report

Meadow Lane
Attendance: 1,637
Referee: Darren Gamage

=== Round 12 ===
12 November 2010
19:30

Moseley	27 - 15	Doncaster Knights
	Report

Billesley
Attendance: 651
Referee: Stuart Dickinson

12 November 2010
19:45

(BP) Nottingham	46 - 23	Birmingham & Solihull
	Report

Meadow Lane
Attendance: 1,389
Referee: Chris Sharp

13 November 2010
15:00

(BP) Worcester Warriors	33 - 13	Plymouth Albion
	Report

Sixways
Attendance: 5,581
Referee: Darren Gamage

13 November 2010
16:30

(BP) Bedford Blues	37 - 10	Rotherham Titans
	Report

Goldington Road
Attendance: 2,075
Referee: Chris White

14 November 2010
14:00

London Welsh	23 - 16	Cornish Pirates (BP)
	Report

Old Deer Park
Attendance: 1,250
Referee: Dean Richards

14 November 2010
15:00

Bristol	30 - 17	Esher
	Report

Memorial Stadium
Attendance: 3,817
Referee: Paul Knowles

=== Round 13 ===
20 November 2010
14:00

Rotherham Titans	3 - 32	Worcester Warriors (BP)
	Report

Clifton Lane
Attendance: 1,521
Referee: Sean Davey

20 November 2010
14:30

(BP) Doncaster Knights	36 - 13	Bristol
	Report

Castle Park
Attendance: 1,224
Referee: Chris White

20 November 2010
15:00

Esher	15 - 53	Bedford Blues (BP)
	Report

Molesey Road
Attendance: 832
Referee: Darren Gamage

20 November 2010
15:00

(BP) Plymouth Albion	21 - 24	Nottingham
	Report

Brickfields
Attendance: 1,521
Referee: Chris White

21 November 2010
14:00

(BP) Cornish Pirates	50 - 7	Moseley
	Report

Mennaye Field
Attendance: 1,872
Referee: Paul Knowles

21 November 2010
15:00

Birmingham & Solihull	9 - 34	London Welsh (BP)
	Report

Sharmans Cross
Attendance: 377
Referee: Llyr Apgeraint-Roberts

=== Round 14 ===
27 November 2010
15:00

(BP) Worcester Warriors	36 - 7	Esher
	Report

Sixways
Attendance: 5,402
Referee: Steve Lee

27 November 2010
16:30

(BP) Bedford Blues	35 - 7	Doncaster Knights
	Report

Goldington Road
Attendance: 1,985
Referee: Rob Debney

27 November 2010

Nottingham	P - P	Rotherham Titans

- Postponed. Game rescheduled to 25 January 2011.

27 November 2010

Birmingham & Solihull	P - P	Cornish Pirates

- Postponed. Game rescheduled to 15 December 2010.

28 November
14:00

London Welsh	20 - 15	Plymouth Albion (BP)
	Report

Old Deer Park
Attendance: 780
Referee: Rowan Kitt

28 November
15:00

Bristol	36 - 25	Moseley
	Report

Memorial Stadium
Attendance: 3,823
Referee: Mathieu Raynal

=== Round 15 ===
4 December 2010
15:00

Plymouth Albion	27 - 0	Birmingham & Solihull
	Report

Brickfields
Attendance: 1,540
Referee: Dean Richards

4 December 2010

Doncaster Knights	P - P	Worcester Warriors

- Postponed. Game rescheduled to 15 December 2010.

4 December 2010

Moseley	P - P	Bedford Blues

- Postponed. Game rescheduled to 14 December 2010.

4 December 2010

Rotherham Titans	P - P	London Welsh

- Postponed. Game rescheduled to 19 January 2011.

4 December 2010

Esher	P - P	Nottingham

- Postponed. Game rescheduled to 18 January 2011.

5 December 2010
14:00

Cornish Pirates	16 - 6	Bristol
	Report

Mennaye Field
Attendance: 2,253
Referee: Rob Debney

=== Round 14 & Round 15 (rescheduled games) ===
14 December 2010
19:45

(BP) Moseley	15 - 22	Bedford Blues
	Report

Billesley
Referee: Rowan Kitt

- Game rescheduled from 4 December 2010.

15 December 2010
19:30

(BP) Birmingham & Solihull	28 - 61	Cornish Pirates (BP)
	Report

Damson Park
Attendance: 407
Referee: Terry Hall

- Game rescheduled from 27 November 2010.

15 December 2010
19:30

Doncaster Knights	16 - 37	Worcester Warriors (BP)
	Report

Castle Park
Attendance: 916
Referee: Darren Gamage

- Game rescheduled from 4 December 2010.

=== Round 16 ===
12 December 2010
14:00

(BP) Plymouth Albion	6 - 10	Cornish Pirates
	Report

Brickfields
Attendance: 2,512
Referee: Michael Tutty

25 December 2010

Nottingham	P - P	Doncaster Knights

- Postponed. Game rescheduled to 9 February 2011.

25 December 2010

Birmingham & Solihull	P - P	Rotherham Titans

- Postponed. Game rescheduled to 2 February 2011.

26 December 2010
15:00

(BP) Bedford Blues	39 - 22	Bristol
	Report

Goldington Road
Attendance: 4,150
Referee: Paul Knowles

26 December 2010
15:00

(BP) Worcester Warriors	45 - 7	Moseley
	Report

Sixways
Attendance: 6,836
Referee: Rowan Kitt

27 December 2010
14:00

London Welsh	24 - 17	Esher (BP)
	Report

Old Deer Park
Attendance: 850
Referee: Chris White

=== Round 17 ===
1 January 2011
14:00

(BP) Rotherham Titans	21 - 22	Plymouth Albion
	Report

Clifton Lane
Attendance: 1,089
Referee: Llyr Apgeraint-Roberts

1 January 2011
15:00

Esher	21 - 13	Birmingham & Solihull
	Report

Molesey Road
Attendance: 1,019
Referee: Sean Davey

1 January 2011
15:00

Moseley	12 - 36	Nottingham (BP)
	Report

Billesley
Attendance: 985
Referee: Terry Hall

2 January 2011
14:00

Cornish Pirates	23 - 13	Bedford Blues
	Report

Mennaye Field
Attendance: 3,051
Referee: Martin Fox

2 January 2011
14:30

(BP) Doncaster Knights	19 - 21	London Welsh
	Report

Castle Park
Attendance: 1,483
Referee: Paul Knowles

2 January 2011
15:00

Bristol	23 - 42	Worcester Warriors (BP)
	Report

Memorial Stadium
Attendance: 5,768
Referee: Darren Gamage

=== Round 18 ===
8 January 2011
14:00

(BP) London Welsh	48 - 12	Moseley
	Report

Old Deer Park
Attendance: 990
Referee: Steve Lee

8 January 2011
14:00

Rotherham Titans	19 - 18	Cornish Pirates (BP)
	Report

Clifton Lane
Attendance: 1,067
Referee: Michael Tutty

8 January 2011
15:00

Plymouth Albion	16 - 12	Esher (BP)
	Report

Brickfields
Attendance: 1,850
Referee: Rob Debney

8 January 2011
15:00

(BP) Worcester Warriors	32 - 0	Bedford Blues
	Report

Sixways
Attendance: 6,398
Referee: Sean Davey

9 January 2011
15:00

(BP) Birmingham & Solihull	35 - 29	Doncaster Knights (BP)
	Report

Damson Park
Attendance: 317
Referee: Darren Gamage

- This fixture would double up as a league and 2010–11 British and Irish Cup game after the corresponding cup game was postponed.

9 January 2011
15:00

(BP) Nottingham	25 - 18	Bristol (BP)
	Report

Meadow Lane
Attendance: 2,001

=== Round 15 (rescheduled games) ===
18 January 2011
20:00

Esher	12 - 43	Nottingham (BP)
	Report

Molesey Road
Attendance: 712
Referee: Dean Richards

- Game rescheduled from 4 December 2010.

19 January 2011
14:00

Rotherham Titans	29 - 13	London Welsh
	Report

Clifton Lane
Attendance: 903
Referee: Andrew Taylorson

- Game rescheduled from 4 December 2010.

=== Round 14 (rescheduled game) ===
28 January 2011
19:45

(BP) Nottingham	37 - 8	Rotherham Titans
	Report

Meadow Lane
Attendance: 1,022
Referee: Paul Knowles

- Game rescheduled from 27 November 2010.

=== Round 19 ===
29 January 2011
14:30

Doncaster Knights	27 - 16	Plymouth Albion
	Report

Castle Park
Attendance: 1,204
Referee: Steve Lee

29 January 2011
15:00

(BP) Bedford Blues	47 - 19	Nottingham
	Report

Goldington Road
Attendance: 2,533
Referee: Terry Hall

29 January 2011
15:00

Esher	23 - 19	Rotherham Titans (BP)
	Report

Molesey Road
Attendance: 970
Referee: Tim Wigglesworth

29 January 2011
15:00

(BP) Moseley	42 - 16	Birmingham & Solihull
	Report

Billesley
Attendance: 1,308
Referee: Dean Richards

30 January 2011
13:00

(2BP) Cornish Pirates	30 - 33	Worcester Warriors (BP)
	Report

Mennaye Field
Attendance: 3,154
Referee: JP Doyle

30 January 2011
15:00

Bristol	23 - 6	London Welsh
	Report

Memorial Stadium
Attendance: 4,005
Referee: Rowan Kitt

=== Round 16 (rescheduled game) ===
2 February 2011
19:45

Birmingham & Solihull	25 - 24	Rotherham Titans (BP)
	Report

Damson Park
Attendance: 377
Referee: Michael Tutty

- Game rescheduled from 12 December 2010.

=== Round 20 ===
5 February 2011
14:00

London Welsh	25 - 22	Bedford Blues (2BP)
	Report

Old Deer Park
Attendance: 1,283
Referee: Steve Lee

5 February 2011
14:00

Rotherham Titans	35 - 34	Doncaster Knights (BP)
	Report

Clifton Lane
Attendance: 1,491
Referee: Terry Hall

5 February 2011
15:00

Esher	13 - 12	Cornish Pirates (BP)
	Report

Molesey Road
Attendance: 1,338
Referee: Rowan Kitt

5 February 2011
15:00

Plymouth Albion	6 - 6	Moseley
	Report

Brickfields
Attendance: 1,574
Referee: Dean Richards

6 February 2011
15:00

Birmingham & Solihull	16 - 26	Bristol
	Report

Damson Park
Attendance: 407
Referee: Martin Fox

6 February 2011
17:30

Nottingham	24 - 38	Worcester Warriors (BP)
	Report

Meadow Lane
Attendance: 1,730
Referee: Tim Wigglesworth

=== Round 16 (rescheduled game) ===
2 February 2011
19:30

(BP) Nottingham	40 - 15	Doncaster Knights
	Report

Meadow Lane
Attendance: 801
Referee: Michael Tutty

- Game rescheduled from 12 December 2010.

=== Round 21 ===
11 February 2011
19:30

Moseley	9 - 5	Rotherham Titans (BP)
	Report

Billesley
Attendance: 763
Referee: Rob Debney

11 February 2011
19:45

(BP) Bedford Blues	52 - 0	Birmingham & Solihull
	Report

Goldington Road
Attendance: 2,834
Referee: Andrew Taylorson

12 February 2011
12:30

(BP) Worcester Warriors	39 - 25	London Welsh (BP)
	Report

Sixways
Attendance: 4,712
Referee: Llyr Apgeraint-Roberts

12 February 2011
14:30

(BP) Doncaster Knights	45 - 42	Esher (2BP)
	Report

Castle Park
Attendance: 957
Referee: Darren Gamage

13 February 2011
14:00

(BP) Cornish Pirates	40 - 0	Nottingham
	Report

Mennaye Field
Attendance: 2,486
Referee: Paul Knowles

13 February 2011
15:00

Bristol	18 - 13	Plymouth Albion (BP)
	Report

Memorial Stadium
Attendance: 5,024
Referee: Sean Davey

=== Round 22 ===
19 February 2011
14:00

(BP) Birmingham & Solihull	20 - 27	Worcester Warriors
	Report

Damson Park
Attendance: 838
Referee: Ian Tempest

19 February 2011
14:00

(BP) Doncaster Knights	13 - 16	Cornish Pirates
	Report

Castle Park
Attendance: 1,091
Referee: Terry Hall

19 February 2011
14:00

(BP) Esher	34 - 13	Moseley
	Report

Molesey Road
Attendance: 1,334
Referee: Llyr Apgeraint-Roberts

19 February 2011
14:00

London Welsh	13 - 22	Nottingham
	Report

Old Deer Park
Attendance: 1,090
Referee: Darren Gamage

19 February 2011
14:00

(BP) Plymouth Albion	24 - 27	Bedford Blues (BP)
	Report

Brickfields
Attendance: 1,885
Referee: JP Doyle

19 February 2011
14:00

Rotherham Titans	22 - 21	Bristol (BP)
	Report

Clifton Lane
Attendance: 1,237
Referee: Paul Knowles

== Stage 2 - Play-offs ==
=== Group A (Promotion) ===
Pos	Team	Pld	W	D	L	PF	PA	PD	B	+	Pts
1	Worcester Warriors	6	6	0	0	256	103	+153	4	3	31
2	London Welsh	6	4	0	2	208	124	+84	4	2	22
3	Nottingham	6	1	0	5	133	198	−65	3	1	8
4	Bristol	6	1	0	5	105	277	−172	2	0	6

=== Round 1 ===
12 March 2011
12:05

(BP) London Welsh	48 - 26	Nottingham (BP)
	Report

Old Deer Park
Attendance: 720
Referee: Michael Tutty

13 March 2011
13:00

Bristol	15 - 44	Worcester Warriors (BP)
	Report

Memorial Stadium
Attendance: 5,240
Referee: Dean Richards

=== Round 2 ===
19 March 2011
15:00

(BP) Worcester Warriors	40 - 23	London Welsh
	Report

Sixways
Attendance: 6,077
Referee: David Rose

20 March 2011
15:00

(BP) Nottingham	43 - 24	Bristol (BP)
	Report

Meadow Lane
Attendance: 1,051
Referee: Darren Gamage

=== Round 3 ===
25 March 2011
19:45

(BP) Nottingham	19 - 25	Worcester Warriors
	Report

Meadow Lane
Attendance: 2,019
Referee: Andrew Taylorson

26 March 2011
14:00

(BP) London Welsh	54 - 9	Bristol
	Report

Old Deer Park
Attendance: 918
Referee: Andrew Small

=== Round 4 ===
1 April 2011
18:45

Bristol	14 - 36	London Welsh (BP)
	Report

Memorial Stadium
Attendance: 3,171
Referee: Paul Knowles

2 April 2011
14:00

(BP) Worcester Warriors	44 - 13	Nottingham
	Report

Sixways
Attendance: 6,215
Referee: Llyr Apgeraint-Roberts

=== Round 5 ===
9 April 2011
14:00

(BP) London Welsh	20 - 22	Worcester Warriors
	Report

Old Deer Park
Attendance: 2,057
Referee: Tim Wigglesworth

10 April 2011
14:00

(BP) Bristol	29 - 19	Nottingham
	Report

Memorial Stadium
Attendance: 2,238
Referee: Darren Gamage

=== Round 6 ===
16 April 2011
14:00

Nottingham	13 - 27	London Welsh
	Report

Meadow Lane
Attendance: 1,682
Referee: Rob Debney

16 April 2011
14:00

(BP) Worcester Warriors	81 - 13	Bristol
	Report

Sixways
Attendance: 6,757
Referee: Michael Tutty

=== Group B (Promotion) ===
Pos	Team	Pld	W	D	L	PF	PA	PD	B	+	Pts
1	Cornish Pirates	6	6	0	0	215	119	+96	3	2	29
2	Bedford Blues	6	3	0	3	226	147	+79	4	3	19
3	Doncaster Knights	6	3	0	3	181	154	+27	5	1	18
4	Rotherham Titans	6	0	0	6	110	312	−202	1	0	1

=== Round 1 ===
12 March 2011
15:00

Rotherham Titans	15 - 58	Bedford Blues (BP)
	Report

Clifton Lane
Attendance: 1,373
Referee: Llyr Apgeraint-Roberts

13 March 2011
15:00

(BP) Cornish Pirates	33 - 25	Doncaster Knights
	Report

Mennaye Field
Attendance: 2,185
Referee: Steve Lee

=== Round 2 ===
19 March 2011
15:00

(BP) Doncaster Knights	41 - 26	Rotherham Titans (BP)
	Report

Castle Park
Attendance: 1,102
Referee: Michael Tutty

20 March 2011
13:05

Bedford Blues	18 - 31	Cornish Pirates
	Report

Goldington Road
Attendance: 2,725
Referee: Greg Garner

=== Round 3 ===
26 March 2011
15:00

(BP) Doncaster Knights	16 - 17	Bedford Blues
	Report

Castle Park
Attendance: 901
Referee: Darren Gamage

27 March 2011
16:05

(BP) Cornish Pirates	67 - 14	Rotherham Titans
	Report

Mennaye Field
Attendance: 2,285
Referee: Luke Pearce

=== Round 4 ===
2 April 2011
14:00

(2BP) Bedford Blues	31 - 33	Doncaster Knights (BP)
	Report

Goldington Road
Attendance: 2,375
Referee: Rob Debney

2 April 2011
14:00

Rotherham Titans	16 - 24	Cornish Pirates
	Report

Clifton Lane
Attendance: 1,026
Referee: Terry Hall

=== Round 5 ===
9 April 2011
14:00

Rotherham Titans	20 - 42	Doncaster Knights (BP)
	Report

Clifton Lane
Attendance: 1,100
Referee: Steve Lee

10 April 2011
14:00

(BP) Cornish Pirates	33 - 22	Bedford Blues
	Report

Mennaye Field
Attendance: 2,985
Referee: Dean Richards

=== Round 6 ===
16 April 2011
14:00

(BP) Bedford Blues	80 - 19	Rotherham Titans
	Report

Goldington Road
Attendance: 1,954
Referee: Llyr Apgeraint-Roberts

16 April 2011
14:00

(BP) Doncaster Knights	24 - 27	Cornish Pirates
	Report

Castle Park
Attendance: 1,173
Referee: Chris White

=== Group C (Relegation) ===
Pos	Team	Pld	W	D	L	PF	PA	PD	B	+	Pts
1	Esher	6	4	0	2	163	146	+17	4	7	27
2	Moseley	6	4	0	2	172	153	+19	3	5	24
3	Plymouth Albion	6	3	0	3	158	146	+12	2	6	20
4	Birmingham & Solihull (R)	6	1	0	5	135	183	−48	3	4	11

(R) Relegated

=== Round 1 ===
11 March 2011
19:45

(BP) Plymouth Albion	37 - 17	Moseley
	Report

Brickfields
Attendance: 1,685
Referee: Luke Pearce

13 March 2011
13:00

Birmingham & Solihull	22 - 30	Esher
	Report

Damson Park
Attendance: 407
Referee: Andrew Taylorson

=== Round 2 ===
19 March 2011
15:00

Esher	38 - 15	Plymouth Albion
	Report

Molesey Road
Attendance: 946
Referee: Steve Lee

19 March 2011
15:00

(2BP) Moseley	34 - 38	Birmingham & Solihull (BP)
	Report

Billesley
Attendance: 1,138

=== Round 3 ===
25 March 2011
19:45

(BP) Moseley	41 - 17	Esher
	Report

Billesley
Attendance: 835
Referee: Terry Hall

25 March 2011
19:45

Plymouth Albion	35 - 24	Birmingham & Solihull
	Report

Brickfields
Attendance: 2,014
Referee: David Rose

=== Round 4 ===
1 April 2011
18:45

Birmingham & Solihull	10 - 32	Plymouth Albion (BP)
	Report

Damson Park
Attendance: 477
Referee: Michael Tutty

2 April 2011
14:00

(BP) Esher	22 - 27	Moseley
	Report

Molesey Road
Attendance: 1,106
Referee: Martin Fox

=== Round 5 ===
9 April 2011
14:00

Plymouth Albion	14 - 27	Esher (BP)
	Report

Brickfields
Attendance: 2,415
Referee: Paul Knowles

10 April 2011
14:00

Birmingham & Solihull	14 - 23	Moseley
	Report

Damson Park
Attendance: 1,277
Referee: Chris White

=== Round 6 ===
16 April 2011
14:00

(BP) Moseley	30 - 25	Plymouth Albion (BP)
	Report

Billesley
Attendance: 1,130
Referee: Terry Hall

16 April 2011
14:00

(BP) Esher	29 - 27	Birmingham & Solihull (2BP)
	Report

Molesey Road
Attendance: 1,219
Referee: Matt Carley

== Stage 3 ==
=== Semi-finals ===
1 May 2011
12:15

Worcester Warriors (England)	23 - 22	(England) Bedford Blues
Try: Goode 34'c, Horstmann 78'c Con: Goode (1/1), Carlisle (1/1); Pen: Goode 22', 40', 53' (3)	Report	Try: Thrower 18'c Con: Pritchard (1/1); Pen: Pritchard 7', 10', 12', 25', 46' (5)

Sixways Stadium, Worcester
Attendance: 6,539
Referee: Andrew Small

FB	15	(England) Tom Arscott
RW	14	(England) Marcel Garvey
OC	13	(England) Alex Crockett	(substituted off) 70'
IC	12	(Samoa) Dale Rasmussen
LW	11	(England) Miles Benjamin
FH	10	(England) Andy Goode	(substituted off) 68'
SH	9	(England) Jonny Arr
N8	8	(England) Kai Horstmann (c)
OF	7	(England) Matt Kvesic	(substituted off) 57'
BF	6	(Ireland) Neil Best
RL	5	(England) Craig Gillies	(yellow card) 46' to 56'
LL	4	(New Zealand) Greg Rawlinson	(substituted off) 64'
TP	3	(Tonga) Tevita Taumoepeau	(substituted off) 68'
HK	2	(Tonga) Aleki Lutui	(substituted off) 70'
LP	1	(England) Adam Black
Replacements:
HK	16	(England) Chris Fortey	(substituted on) 70'
PR	17	(Scotland) Bruce Douglas	(substituted on) 68'
LK	18	(England) Graham Kitchener	(substituted on) 64'	(yellow card) 78' to 80'
FL	19	(England) Jake Abbott	(substituted on) 57'
SH	20	(England) Ollie Frost
FH	21	(England) Joe Carlisle	(substituted on) 68'
CE	22	(Scotland) Alex Grove	(substituted on) 70'
	Coach: (England) Richard Hill

FB	15	(England) Edd Thrower
RW	14	(South Africa) Handre Schmidt
OC	13	(Australia) Myles Dorrian
IC	12	(England) Tom Bedford
LW	11	(Canada) James Pritchard (c)
FH	10	(England) Jake Sharp	(substituted off) 51'
SH	9	(England) Will Chudley
N8	8	(Samoa) Paul Tupai	(substituted off) 79'
OF	7	(England) Alex Rae	(substituted off) 78'
BF	6	(England) Gregor Gillanders
RL	5	(England) George Kruis
LL	4	(England) Mike Howard	(substituted off) 70'
TP	3	(England) Phil Boulton	(substituted off) 57'
HK	2	(England) Dan Richmond
LP	1	(England) Dan Seal
Replacements:
HK	16	(England) Chris Locke
PR	17	(England) Sam Walsh	(substituted on) 57'	(yellow card) 70' to 80'
LK	18	(Scotland) Sean Tomes	(substituted on) 70'	(yellow card) 78' to 80'
N8	19	(England) Chris Goodman	(substituted on) 79'
FL	20	(England) William Fraser	(substituted on) 78'
SH	20	(South Africa) Darryl Veenendaal
CE	22	(England) Duncan Taylor	(substituted on) 51'
Coach: (Wales) Mike Rayer

Touch judges:
(England) Chris Sharp
(England) Eric Woodmason
Television match official:
(England) Dave Matthews

1 May 2011
17:45

Cornish Pirates (England)	18 - 10	(England) London Welsh
Try: Cattle 62'c, McAtee 76'm Con: Cook (1/2); Pen: Cook 12', 69' (2)	Report	Try: Corker 16'c Con: Ross (1/1); Pen: Ross 9' (1)

Mennaye Field, Penzance
Attendance: 3,001
Referee: David Rose

FB	15	(England) Rob Cook
RW	14	(South Africa) Nick Jackson
OC	13	(England) Matt Hopper
IC	12	(England) Tom Luke	(substituted off) 60'
LW	11	(Wales) Rhodri McAtee
FH	10	(New Zealand) Johnny Bentley
SH	9	(Wales) Gavin Cattle (c)
N8	8	(New Zealand) Laurie McGlone
OF	7	(England) Sam Betty		(yellow card) 10' to 20' (substituted off) 51'
BF	6	(England) Chris Morgan
RL	5	(England) Ben Gulliver	(substituted off) 60'
LL	4	(England) Mike Myerscough
TP	3	(England) Alan Paver	(substituted off) 45'
HK	2	(England) Dave Ward	(substituted off) 58'
LP	1	(England) Paul Andrew
Replacements:
PR	16	(England) Carl Rimmer	(substituted on) 45'
HK	17	(Germany) Rob Elloway	(substituted on) 58'
FL	18	(England) Phil Burgess	(substituted on) 51'
N8	19	(England) Kyle Marriott	(substituted on) 60'
CE	20	(Wales) Steve Winn
CE	21	(England) Drew Locke	(substituted on) 60'
SH	22	(England) James Doherty
	Coach: (New Zealand) Chris Stirling

FB	15	(Wales) Aled Thomas	(substituted off) 56'
RW	14	(England) Liam Gibson
OC	13	(Tonga) Hudson Tongaʻuiha
IC	12	(England) Simon Whatling
LW	11	(South Africa) Errie Claassens	(substituted off) 40'
FH	10	(Scotland) Gordon Ross
SH	9	(Wales) Robert Lewis	(substituted off) 68'
N8	8	(England) Ben Russell	(substituted off) 47' (substituted on) 55' (substituted off) 58'
OF	7	(England) Michael Hills
BF	6	(Wales) Jonathan Mills (c)
RL	5	(England) Matt Corker
LL	4	(Wales) Mike Powell	(substituted off) 51'
TP	3	(South Africa) Lorne Ward
HK	2	(Tonga) Viliami Ma'asi	(substituted off) 78'
LP	1	(United States) Shawn Pittman	(yellow card) 45' to 55'
Replacements:
HK	16	(Wales) Saul Nelson	(substituted on) 78'
PR	17	(England) Max Lahiff	(substituted on) 47' (substituted off) 55'
LK	18	(England) Martin Purdy	(substituted on) 51'
N8	19	(Wales) Lee Beach	(substituted on) 58'
SH	20	(England) Ben Stevenson	(substituted on) 68'
CE	20	(England) Dominic Shabbo	(substituted on) 56'
WG	22	(England) Marland Yarde	(substituted on) 40'
Coach: (England) Phil Greening

Touch judges:
(England) Steve Leyshon
(England) Peter Parker-Sedgemore
Television match official:
(England) Geoff Warren

=== Final ===
11 May 2011
19:45

Cornish Pirates (England)	12 - 21	(England) Worcester Warriors
Pen: Cook 21', 38', 57', 69' (4)	Report	Try: Benjamin 5'm, Goode 30'c Con: Goode (1/2); Pen: Goode 18', 39', 54' (3)

Mennaye Field, Penzance
Attendance: 3,500
Referee: Martin Fox

FB	15	(England) Rob Cook
RW	14	(Wales) Wes Davies	(substituted off) 63'
OC	13	(England) Matt Hopper
IC	12	(England) Tom Luke	(substituted off) 54'
LW	11	(Wales) Rhodri McAtee
FH	10	(New Zealand) Johnny Bentley
SH	9	(Wales) Gavin Cattle (c)
N8	8	(New Zealand) Laurie McGlone	(substituted off) 69'
OF	7	(England) Phil Burgess
BF	6	(England) Chris Morgan
RL	5	(England) Mike Myerscough
LL	4	(Scotland) Ian Nimmo
TP	3	(England) Alan Paver	(substituted off) 69'
HK	2	(England) Dave Ward	(substituted off) 75'
LP	1	(England) Paul Andrew	(substituted off) 63'
Replacements:
PR	16	(England) Ryan Storer	(substituted on) 63'
HK	17	(Germany) Rob Elloway	(substituted on) 63'
PR	18	(England) Carl Rimmer	(substituted on) 69'
FL	19	(South Africa) Tyrone Holmes	(substituted on) 75'
N8	20	(England) Kyle Marriott	(substituted on) 69'
CE	21	(England) Drew Locke	(substituted on) 54'
SH	22	(England) James Doherty
	Coach: (New Zealand) Chris Stirling

FB	15	(England) Chris Pennell (c)
RW	14	(England) Marcel Garvey
OC	13	(England) Alex Crockett	(substituted off) 57'
IC	12	(Samoa) Dale Rasmussen
LW	11	(England) Miles Benjamin
FH	10	(England) Andy Goode	(substituted off) 75'
SH	9	(England) Jonny Arr
N8	8	(England) Kai Horstmann
OF	7	(England) Jake Abbott
BF	6	(Ireland) Neil Best	(yellow card) 56' to 66'	(substituted off) 66'
RL	5	(England) Craig Gillies
LL	4	(New Zealand) Greg Rawlinson	(substituted off) 61'
TP	3	(Tonga) Tevita Taumoepeau	(substituted off) 61'
HK	2	(England) Chris Fortey	(substituted off) 54'
LP	1	(England) Adam Black
Replacements:
HK	16	(Tonga) Aleki Lutui	(substituted on) 54'
PR	17	(Scotland) Bruce Douglas	(substituted on) 61'
LK	18	(England) Graham Kitchener	(substituted on) 61'
N8	19	(England) Adam Balding	(substituted on) 66'
SH	20	(England) Ollie Frost
FH	21	(England) Joe Carlisle	(substituted on) 75'
CE	22	(Scotland) Alex Grove	(substituted on) 57'
Coach: (England) Richard Hill

Touch judges:
(England) Gareth Copsey
(England) Chris Sharp
Television match official:
(England) Steve Leyshon

18 May 2011
19:45

Worcester Warriors (England)	25 - 20	(England) Cornish Pirates
Try: Garvey 12'c, Benjamin 43'c, Goode 46'm Con: Goode (2/3); Pen: Goode 6' (1); Drop: Goode 21' (1)	Report	Try: Locke 53'c, Penalty try 74'c Con: Cook (2/2); Pen: Cook 2', 35' (2)

Sixways Stadium, Worcester
Attendance: 12,024
Referee: JP Doyle

FB	15	(England) Chris Pennell (c)
RW	14	(England) Marcel Garvey	(substituted off) 79'
OC	13	(Scotland) Alex Grove
IC	12	(Samoa) Dale Rasmussen	(substituted off) 70'
LW	11	(England) Miles Benjamin
FH	10	(England) Andy Goode	(substituted off) 70'
SH	9	(England) Jonny Arr
N8	8	(England) Kai Horstmann
OF	7	(England) Jake Abbott
BF	6	(Ireland) Neil Best	(yellow card) 72' to 80'
RL	5	(England) Craig Gillies
LL	4	(New Zealand) Greg Rawlinson	(substituted off) 70'
TP	3	(Tonga) Tevita Taumoepeau	(substituted off) 75'
HK	2	(England) Chris Fortey	(substituted off) 33'
LP	1	(England) Adam Black
Replacements:
HK	16	(Tonga) Aleki Lutui	(substituted on) 33'
PR	17	(Scotland) Bruce Douglas	(substituted on) 75'
LK	18	(England) Graham Kitchener	(substituted on) 70'
N8	19	(England) Adam Balding
SH	20	(England) Ollie Frost	(substituted on) 79'
FH	21	(England) Joe Carlisle	(substituted on) 70'
CE	22	(England) Alex Crockett	(substituted on) 70'
	Coach: (England) Richard Hill

FB	15	(England) Rob Cook
RW	14	(South Africa) Nick Jackson
OC	13	(England) Matt Hopper
IC	12	(England) Drew Locke
LW	11	(Wales) Rhodri McAtee	(substituted off) 40'
FH	10	(New Zealand) Johnny Bentley
SH	9	(Wales) Gavin Cattle (c)	(substituted off) 62'
N8	8	(England) Kyle Marriott
OF	7	(England) Phil Burgess	(substituted off) 50'
BF	6	(England) Chris Morgan
RL	5	(England) Mike Myerscough
LL	4	(New Zealand) Laurie McGlone	(substituted off) 58'
TP	3	(England) Carl Rimmer	(substituted off) 62'
HK	2	(Germany) Rob Elloway	(substituted off) 58'
LP	1	(England) Ryan Storer	(substituted off) 58'
Replacements:
PR	16	(England) Paul Andrew	(substituted on) 58'
HK	17	(England) Dave Ward	(substituted on) 58'
PR	18	(England) Alan Paver	(substituted on) 62'
LK	19	(Scotland) Ian Nimmo	(substituted on) 58'
FL	20	(England) Sam Betty	(substituted on) 50'
CE	21	(England) Tom Luke	(substituted on) 40'
SH	22	(England) James Doherty	(substituted on) 62'
Coach: (New Zealand) Chris Stirling

Touch judges:
(England) Gareth Copsey
(England) Chris Sharp
Television match official:
(England) Steve Leyshon

== Total Season Attendances ==
- Includes playoff games.

Club	Home Games	Total	Average	Highest	Lowest	% Capacity
Bedford Blues	14	37,150	2,654	4,150	1,954	53%
Birmingham & Solihull	14	8,261	590	1,277	317	19%
Bristol	14	57,647	4,118	5,768	2,238	34%
Cornish Pirates	16	39,195	2,450	3,500	1,737	61%
Doncaster Knights	14	16,548	1,182	1,830	901	38%
Esher	14	18,228	1,302	2,500	712	43%
London Welsh	14	17,348	1,239	2,057	720	21%
Moseley	13 (Note: Missing home attendance v Bedford Blues on 14 December 2010.)	11,624	894	1,308	651	30%
Nottingham	14	21,117	1,508	2,349	801	8%
Plymouth Albion	14	30,692	2,192	4,847	1,521	34%
Rotherham Titans	14	16,755	1,289	1,921	903	48%
Worcester Warriors	16	104,385	6,524	12,024	4,712	54%

== Individual statistics ==
- Player stats include playoff games as well as regular season games. Also note that points scorers includes tries as well as conversions, penalties and drop goals.

=== Top points scorers ===
Rank	Player	Team	Appearances	Points
1	(England) Andy Goode	Worcester Warriors	29	381
2	(England) Rob Cook	Cornish Pirates	30	366
3	(England) Tristan Roberts	Doncaster Knights	27	309
4	(Japan) James Arlidge	Nottingham	24	296
5	(Canada) James Pritchard	Bedford Blues	21	280
6	(Argentina) Juan Pablo Socino	Rotherham Titans	27	275
7	(England) Sam Ulph	Esher	26	237
8	(England) Alex Davies	Plymouth Albion	25	236
9	(England) Ollie Thomas	Moseley	22	205
10	(Scotland) Gordon Ross	London Welsh	19	197

=== Top try scorers ===
Rank	Player	Team	Appearances	Tries
1	(England) Miles Benjamin	Worcester Warriors	28	26
2	(England) Marcel Garvey	Worcester Warriors	29	19
3	(England) Simon Hunt	Birmingham & Solihull	20	17
4	(England) Edd Thrower	Bedford Blues	21	15
4	(England) Josh Drauniniu	London Welsh	23	15
4	(Ireland) Matty Williams	Doncaster Knights	26	15
5	(South Africa) Johannes Schmidt	Bedford Blues	21	14
6	(Scotland) Stephen McColl	Doncaster Knights	27	13
7	(England) Tim Streather	Cornish Pirates	23	12
7	(England) Phil Burgess	Cornish Pirates	25	12
7	(England) David Jackson	Nottingham	25	12
7	(England) Andy Goode	Worcester Warriors	29	12

== Season records ==
=== Team ===
Largest home win — 68 pts

81 - 13 Worcester Warriors at home to Bristol on 16 April 2011

Largest away win — 46 pts

68 - 22 London Welsh away to Moseley on 16 October 2010

Most points scored — 81 pts

81 - 13 Worcester Warriors at home to Bristol on 16 April 2011

Most tries in a match — 12

Bedford Blues at home to Rotherham Titans on 16 April 2011

Most conversions in a match — 10 (x2)

Bedford Blues at home to Rotherham Titans on 16 April 2011
Worcester Warriors at home to Bristol on 16 April 2011

Most penalties in a match — 7 (x5)

Nottingham at home to London Welsh on 29 August 2011
Nottingham away to Doncaster Knights on 2 October 2011
Esher at home to Birmingham & Solihull on 1 January 2011
Rotherham Titans at home to Doncaster Knights on 5 February 2012
Plymouth Albion at home to Birmingham & Solihull on 25 March 2012

Most drop goals in a match — 3

Worcester Warriors away to Bedford Blues on 16 October 2010

=== Player ===
Most points in a match — 30

(Canada) James Pritchard for Bedford Blues at home to Rotherham Titans on 16 April 2011

Most tries in a match — 4 (x2)

(England) James Short for Bedford Blues at home to Moseley on 25 September 2010
(England) Josh Drauniniu for London Welsh away to Moseley on 16 October 2010

Most conversions in a match — 10

(Canada) James Pritchard for Bedford Blues at home to Rotherham Titans on 16 April 2011

Most penalties in a match — 7 (x5)

(Japan) James Arlidge for Nottingham at home to London Welsh on 29 August 2011
(Japan) James Arlidge for Nottingham away to Doncaster Knights on 2 October 2011
(England) Sam Ulph for Esher at home to Birmingham & Solihull on 1 January 2011
(Argentina) Juan Pablo Socino for Rotherham Titans at home to Doncaster Knights on 5 February 2012
(England) Alex Davies for Plymouth Albion at home to Birmingham & Solihull on 25 March 2011

Most drop goals in a match — 3

(England) Andy Goode for Exeter Chiefs away to Bristol on 26 May 2010

=== Attendances ===
Highest — 12,024

Worcester Warriors at home to Cornish Pirates on 18 May 2011

Lowest — 317

Birmingham & Solihull at home to Doncaster Knights on 9 January 2011

Highest Average Attendance — 6,524

Worcester Warriors

Lowest Average Attendance — 590

Birmingham & Solihull
