= 2011–12 Cornish Pirates RFC season =

2011–12 Cornish Pirates Rugby season
- Nickname: The Pirates
- Founded: 1945
- Location: Penzance, Cornwall
- Ground: Mennaye Field (Capacity: 3200 2082 seating)
- CEO: Rod Coward
- Coach(es): (High Performance Manager) Chris Stirling (New Zealand) left the club April 2012 and replaced by Ian Davies (Forwards) (Wales) Ian Davies (Backs) (South Africa) Harvey Biljon
- Captain: Gavin Cattle
- Top scorer: 295 Rob Cook
- Most tries: 14 David Doherty
- League: RFU Championship
- 2011–12: 3rd

Official website
- www.cornish-pirates.com

The 2011–12 season was the Cornish Pirates 9th season in the second tier of the English rugby union league system, the RFU Championship and their third in the British and Irish Cup. The Pirates finished 3rd in Stage One of the Championship, allowing them to qualify for the promotion stages, where they were losing finalist to London Welsh RFC. They also reached the semi–finals of the British and Irish Cup losing to Cross Keys in Wales.

== Pre–season Friendlies ==
Date	Opponents	H / A	Result	Score	Attendance	Match Report	Ref
20 August 2011	Exeter Chiefs	H	L	3–58	2200		
27 August 2011	Worcester Warriors	A	W	24–21	3600		

== RFU Championship ==
=== Stage One matches ===
Stage one is a league programme of 22 matches starting on Saturday, 3 September 2011 and completed by Saturday, 25 February 2012. Each team play 11 matches at home and 11 away. Top eight teams play in the promotion play–offs, bottom four play in the relegation play–off.

	Date	Opponents	H / A	Result	Score	Attendance	Position	Match Report	Ref
1	3 September 2011	Moseley	A	D	27–27	806			
2	11 September 2011	Doncaster Knights	H	W	39–32	1990			
3	17 September 2011	London Scottish	A	W	25–23	1200	2nd		
4	24 September 2011	Leeds Carnegie	H	W	52–10	2100	1st		
5	1 October 2011	Plymouth Albion	A	W	20–16	2850	1st		
6	9 October 2011	Bedford Blues	H	L	24–34	2092	3rd		
7	15 October 2011	Nottingham	A	D	25–25	1363	3rd		
8	23 October 2011	Esher Rugby	H	W	34–18	1965	2nd		
9	30 October 2011	London Welsh	A	D	17–17	1749	3rd		
10	6 November 2011	Rotherham Titans	H	W	30–13	2506	1st		
11	20 November 2011	Bristol Rugby	A	L	33–37	6044	3rd		
12	26 November 2011	Doncaster Knights	A	L	21–36	1118	5th		
13	4 December 2011	London Scottish	H	W	42–10	2168	4th		
14	10 December 2011	Leeds Carnegie	A	L	13–14	2568	5th		
15	24 December 2011	Plymouth Albion	H	W	33–12	3214	4th		
16	1 January 2012	Bedford Blues	A	L	13–32	4396	4th		
17	8 January 2012	Nottingham Rugby	H	W	26–24	2026	4th		
18	14 January 2012	Esher Rugby	A	W	36–30	1263	4th		
19	29 January 2012	London Welsh	H	W	27–6	1802	2nd		
	4 February 2012	Rotherham Titans	A		P–P		2nd		
	11 February 2012	Rotherham Titans	A		P–P		3rd		
	12 February 2012	Rotherham Titans	A		P–P		3rd		
20	13 February 2012	Rotherham Titans	A	W	19–14	463	2nd		
21	19 February 2012	Bristol	H	W	18–17	3115	3rd		
22	25 February 2012	Moseley	H	W	32–17	1844	3rd		

24 September H v Leed Carnegie televised on Sky Sports

=== Stage One final table ===
2011–12 RFU Championship table
Pos	Team	Pld	W	D	L	PF	PA	PD	B	Pts	Qualification
1	Bristol	22	17	0	5	615	386	+229	13	81	Promotion playoffs
2	Bedford Blues	22	14	1	7	640	476	+164	16	74	Promotion playoffs
3	Cornish Pirates	22	14	3	5	606	464	+142	12	74	Promotion playoffs
4	London Welsh (C)	22	13	2	7	528	432	+96	11	67	Promotion playoffs
5	Nottingham	22	12	2	8	599	465	+134	10	62	Promotion playoffs
6	Leeds Carnegie	22	13	1	8	470	505	−35	6	60	Promotion playoffs
7	Rotherham Titans	22	11	1	10	469	431	+38	11	57	Promotion playoffs
8	Doncaster Knights	22	9	2	11	467	524	−57	10	50	Promotion playoffs
9	London Scottish	22	6	0	16	422	543	−121	10	34	Relegation playoffs
10	Moseley	22	6	1	15	445	634	−189	7	33	Relegation playoffs
11	Plymouth Albion	22	6	0	16	362	528	−166	6	30	Relegation playoffs
12	Esher (R)	22	4	1	17	376	611	−235	5	23	Relegation playoffs

Rules for classification: If teams are level at any stage, tiebreakers are applied in the following order:
1. Number of matches won
2. Difference between points for and against
3. Total number of points for
4. Aggregate number of points scored in matches between tied teams
5. Number of matches won excluding the first match, then the second and so on until the tie is settled
  (C) Champion; (R) Relegated

=== Stage Two matches ===
Stage Two: The promotion play–offs are played in two groups of four with the top two teams qualifying for the knock–out stages. The relegation play–offs consist of one group of four teams with the bottom team being relegated. Each team plays three matches at home and three away. The top two teams in each group qualify for the semi–finals.

	Date	Opponents	H / A	Result	Score	Attendance	Position	Match Report	Ref
1	10 March 2012	Leeds Carnegie	H	D	14–14	1953	2nd		
2	16 March 2012	Bedford Blues	A	L	25–26	3377	2nd		
3	25 March 2012	Rotherham Titans	H	W	25–17	1923	2nd		
4	31 March 2012	Rotherham Titans	A	W	17–14	1222	2nd		
5	15 April 2012	Bedford Blues	H	W	21–20	2139	2nd		
6	21 April 2012	Leeds Carnegie	A	L	25–42	1588	2nd		

=== Group B table (Promotion) ===
Pos	Team	P	W	D	L	F	A	+/–	BP	PTS	Adj
1	Bedford Blues	6	4	1	1	155	109	46	3	24	3
2	Cornish Pirates	6	3	1	2	127	133	–6	2	18	2
3	Leeds Carnegie	6	2	2	2	124	127	–3	2	15	1
4	Rotherham Titans	6	1	0	5	88	125	–37	2	6	0

* Adj – refers to number of points awarded before the start of the play-offs.

Points per match are awarded as follows:

- Four points for a win
- Two points for a draw
- 1 bonus point for scoring four tries and/or losing a match by seven points or less
- Knock-out stages consist of two-legged semi–finals and final with the highest league finisher from Stage One being the home team

=== Semi–final ===
7 May 2012
12:05

Cornish Pirates	45–24	Bristol
	report

Mennaye Field, Penzance
Attendance: 2983
Referee: J P Doyle (England)

13 May 2012
12:45

Bristol	29–18	Cornish Pirates
	report

Memorial Stadium, Bristol
Referee: S Davey (England)

=== Final ===
23 May 2012
19:45

Cornish Pirates	21 – 37	London Welsh
	report

Mennaye Field, Penzance
Attendance: 3205
Referee: G Garner (RFU)

30 May 2012
19:45

London Welsh	29 – 20	Cornish Pirates
	report

Kassam Stadium, Oxford
Attendance: 3456
Referee: David Rose

== British and Irish Cup ==
The Cornish Pirates were drawn in Pool one and played the teams in Pool two. The Pool winners and the two best runners–up qualified for the Quarter–finals.

=== Pool one fixtures ===
Date	Opponents	H / A	Result	Score	Venue	Attendance	Match Report	Ref
21 September 2011	Bristol	H	W	50–22	The Mennaye	1612		
12 October 2011	Plymouth Albion	A	W	38–0	Brickfields	1425		
12 November 2011	Munster A	A	W	10–6	Clonmel RFC	1207		
18 December 2011	Cross Keys	H	W	30–3	The Mennaye	2259		

=== Pool one final table ===
Team	Played	Won	Drawn	Lost	For	Against	BP	Pts
(England) Cornish Pirates (1)	4	4	0	0	128	31	2	18
(Scotland) Ayr	4	2	0	2	44	72	1	9
(England) Moseley	4	2	0	2	46	106	0	8
(Wales) Neath	4	1	0	3	62	108	1	5

=== Quarter–final ===
Date	Opponents	H / A	Result	Score	Venue	Attendance	Match Report	Ref
22 January 2012	Nottingham Rugby	H	W	33–3	The Mennaye	1492		

=== Semi–final ===
Date	Opponents	H / A	Result	Score	Venue	Attendance	Match Report	Ref
7 April 2012	Cross Keys	A	L	16–20	Pandy Park	2500		

== Squad 2011–12 ==
Note: Flags indicate national union under World Rugby eligibility rules. Players may hold more than one non-World Rugby nationality.

Player	Position	Union
Tom Cowan–Dickie (Exeter Chiefs)	Hooker	England
Rob Elloway	Hooker	Germany
Dave Ward	Hooker	England
Paul Andrew	Prop	England
Lloyd Fairbrother (Exeter Chiefs)	Prop	England
Rudi Brits	Prop	South Africa
Alan Paver (Exeter Chiefs)	Prop	England
Carl Rimmer	Prop	England
Ryan Storer	Prop	England
Laurie McGlone	Lock	New Zealand
Mike Myerscough	Lock	England
Ian Nimmo	Lock	Scotland
Matt Smith	Lock	England
Phil Burgess	Flanker	England
Dave Ewers (Exeter Chiefs)	Flanker	England
Chris Morgan	Flanker	England
Ben Maidment	Flanker	England
Blair Cowan	Number 8	New Zealand
Kyle Marriott	Number 8	England

Player	Position	Union
Gavin Cattle	Scrum-half	Wales
James Doherty	Scrum-half	England
Tom Kessell	Scrum-half	England
Johnny Bentley	Fly-half	New Zealand
Ceiron Thomas	Fly-half	Wales
Aaron Penberthy	Fly-half	England
Drew Locke	Centre	England
Sam Hill (Exeter Chiefs)	Centre	England
Andrew Suniula	Centre	United States
Tom Cooper	Centre	England
Ryan Westren	Centre	England
Wes Davies	Wing	Wales
Rhodri McAtee	Wing	Wales
Darren Daniel	Wing	Wales
David Doherty	Wing	England
Grant Pointer	Wing	England
Charlie Walker–Blair (Exeter Chiefs)	Wing	England
Rob Cook	Fullback	England
Matt Evans	Fullback	Canada

=== Dual Registration ===
- Tom Cowan–Dickie (Exeter Chiefs)
- David Ewers (Exeter Chiefs)
- Lloyd Fairbrother (Exeter Chiefs)
- Sam Hill (Exeter Chiefs)
- Drew Locke (Exeter Chiefs)
- Alan Paver (Exeter Chiefs)
- Charles Walker–Blair (Exeter Chiefs)

=== Internationally Capped Players ===
Andrew Suniula joined the Pirates after the 2011 World Cup.

== Transfers 2011–12 ==
=== Players In ===
- (England) Tom Cooper (from (Wales) Newport Gwent Dragons)
- (England) David Doherty (from (England) Jersey)
- (England) Tom Kessell (from (England) Plymouth Albion)
- (England) Ben Maidment (from (England) Moseley)
- (England) Matt Smith (from (Wales) UWIC
- (England) Ryan Westren (from (England) Launceston) moved to London Scottish in December 2011
- (United States) Andrew Suniula (from (United States) Chicago Griffins)
- (Wales) Darren Daniel (from (Wales) Carmarthen Quins)
- (Wales) Ceiron Thomas (from (England) Leeds Carnegie)
- (Canada) Matt Evans (from (Wales) Newport Gwent Dragons)

=== Players Out ===
- (England) Sam Betty (to (England) Worcester Warriors)
- (New Zealand) Blair Cowan (to (England) Worcester Warriors in January 2012)
- (Scotland) James Currie (to (England) Worcester Warriors)
- (England) Ben Gulliver (to (England) Worcester Warriors)
- (South Africa) Tyrone Holmes (released)
- (England) Matt Hopper (to (England) Harlequins)
- (South Africa) Nick Jackson (released)
- (England) Tom Luke (released)
- (Wales) Steve Winn (released)

== Coaching staff ==
- Chris Stirling ( (New Zealand) ) (High Performance Manager) appointed in January 2009 and left club in April 2012.
- Ian Davies ( (Wales) ) (Head Coach) from April 2012. Previously Forwards Coach appointed in April 2009.
- Harvey Biljon ( (South Africa) ) (Backs Coach) appointed in April 2009.
- Simon Raynes ( (New Zealand) ) (Strength and Conditioning Coach) since summer 2005.

== See also ==
- 2011–12 RFU Championship
- 2011-12 British and Irish Cup
