= Edd Thrower =

English rugby union player

Personal information
- Full name: Edd Thrower
- Born: 1 September 1982 (age 43) London, England
- Height: 6 ft 0 in (1.83 m)
- Weight: 15 st 11 lb (96 kg)

Playing information
- Position: Wing; Fullback
Club
Years	Team	Pld	T	G	FG	P
2011	London Welsh
2010–2011	Bedford Blues
2009–2010	Crociati Parma Rugby
2007–2009	Saracens	8				(10)
2004–2007	London Wasps	14				(72)
2001–2004	London Irish	6				(10)
	Total	28	0	0	0	92
Representative
Years	Team	Pld	T	G	FG	P
	England U21
	England U19
	England U18

Edd Thrower (born 1 September 1982 in London, UK) is an English rugby union footballer who plays at wing or fullback for London Welsh RFC. Thrower began his professional playing career in 2001 with Premiership side London Irish, where he spent three seasons. Thrower played for Wasps from 2004 to 2007 and spent the following two seasons at Saracens. He played for Italian Premiership side Parma Rugby FC during the 2009–10 season, before returning to England to play in the 2010-11 RFU Championship for the Bedford Blues. Thrower signed for London Welsh RFC in June 2011.

Thrower has represented England at U18, U19 and U21 levels.

== Early life ==
Thrower was born in London, UK on 1 September 1982. After being educated at Downside School, he began his professional rugby career with London Irish.

== Playing career ==
=== London Irish 2001–2004 ===
Thrower began his senior career at London Irish, but found first-team experience hard to come by, making only a single Premiership start along with a handful of appearances from the bench. Despite this he achieved recognition in appearances for England national age group level teams.

=== London Wasps 2004–2007 ===
Thrower made the short move to London Wasps in 2004 in the search of more top flight experience. In the 2004-05 Zurich Premiership he made progress making 8 appearances, gaining some goal kicking experience under the pressure of top level domestic competition. There was also further England national age group level experience.

The following season was less happy, missing the whole of 2005-06 Guinness Premiership through injury, following a pattern of injury problems that blighted much of his time with Wasps.

Returning for the 2006-07 Guinness Premiership campaign, Thrower made 5 Premiership starts, scoring all four of his Premiership tries for the season in a single game against Bath.

=== Saracens 2007–2009 ===
Thrower joined Saracens on 1 July 2007, the third of the four traditional 'London' clubs he has played for. He made his club debut against his old club London Wasps at the start of the 2007-08 Guinness Premiership on 15 September 2007, coming on for a short stint as a replacement during the London Double Header opening to the season. He proceeded to have a series of starts and appearances from the bench, including involvement in all of the first eight games of Saracens' season and scoring two tries.
