= Kai Horstmann =

Zimbabwean rugby union player (born 1981)

- Born: 21 September 1981 (age 45) Harare, Zimbabwe
- Height: 1.91 m (6 ft 3 in)
- Weight: 109 kg (17 st 2 lb)
- School: Wellington College, Berkshire, UK
- Notable relative: Thom Evans (cousin) Max Evans (cousin)
- Occupation: Professional rugby union player

Rugby union career
- Position: Flanker / Number eight
- Current team: Exeter Chiefs RFC
Senior career
Years	Team	Apps	(Points)
2002–2005	Harlequins	5	(0)
2005–2012	Worcester Warriors	107	(45)
2012–	Exeter Chiefs	95	(35)
International career
Years	Team	Apps	(Points)
1998-1999	England U16		(5)
2006	England Saxons		(10)
National sevens team
Years	Team		Comps
2003-2004	England 7's		IRB World Series

Kai Horstmann (born 21 September 1981) is a Zimbabwe born English rugby union player who plays for Exeter Chiefs in the Aviva Premiership. He formerly played for Worcester Warriors and Harlequins and has made over 175 Premiership appearances to date.

Horstmann plays as number eight or flanker, and represented the England Saxons for the Churchill Cup tour of North America in July 2006, receiving Man of the Match twice. He was also a member of the IRB World Sevens Series squad in the 2003–04 season, winning in Hong Kong, Dubai and Twickenham.

He was a member of the 2003–2004 team that won the European Challenge Cup at Harlequins RFC.

Horstmann joined Worcester Warriors from Harlequins in May 2005. He led the team on many occasions and made 173 appearances for the club.

Horstmann was a firm favourite of both the players and supporters and was voted Players' Player-of-the-Year in the 2005–06 and 2006–07 seasons and managed a double in 2008–09 when he was voted both Club Player-of-the-Year and Players Player-of-the-Year.

The Number Eight made his 150th appearance for the club during the 2010–11 season, a year when he was named vice captain and captained the side in the absence of Chris Pennell.

In May 2012, he signed a two-year contract at Exeter Chiefs. In 2014 he was part of the team that won the LV Cup and was rewarded man of the match in the final against Northampton Saints. In 2017, he was part of the team that won the Aviva Premiership at Twickenham. At the end of the 2016–17 season Horstmann was presented with 'Club Man of the Year' at the End of Season Awards Dinner.

In the autumn of 2017 Horstmann launched a new training company, Team Kai, teaching leadership and teamwork skills and strategies based on his experiences operating in high performing teamwork environments during his rugby career. www.teamkai.co.uk
