= Matt Smith (rugby union, born 1989) =

English rugby union player

- Born: Matthew Smith; 26 October 1989 (age 37) Hexham, England
- Height: 2.03 m (6 ft 8 in)
- Weight: 118 kg (18 st 8 lb)

Rugby union career
- Position: Lock
- Current team: Cornish Pirates
Senior career
Years	Team	Apps	(Points)
- Sandal
- Leeds Carnegie Academy
- UWIC
- Cornish Pirates
2011–12	Leeds Tykes		
International career
Years	Team	Apps	(Points)
2010–11	England Students	3	(5)

Matt Smith (born 26 October 1989 in Hexham) is a rugby union footballer who plays lock for Leeds Tykes and England Students.
