= Mike Powell (rugby union) =

Welsh rugby union player

Michael ("Mike") James Powell (born 23 November 1978 (age 47)) is a Welsh rugby union player. Powell played for Caldicot, Pontypool, the Exeter Chiefs, Bridgend RFC, the Celtic Warriors and the Ospreys before joining London Welsh. He signed for Moseley for the 2012–13 season.

Powell captained Wales Students while at university.

Mike Powell's position of choice is at lock.
