= Rob Elloway =

Germany international rugby union player

- Born: Rob Elloway; 9 November 1983 (age 43) Rinteln, West Germany
- Height: 1.83 m (6 ft 0 in)
- Weight: 105 kg (16 st 7 lb)

Rugby union career
- Position: Hooker
Amateur team(s)
Years	Team	Apps	(Points)
- Sedgley Park R.U.F.C.
Senior career
Years	Team	Apps	(Points)
2002–07	Gloucester Rugby	30	(5)
2007	Pertemps Bees		
2007–17	Cornish Pirates	229	(0)
- Correct as of 14 May 2017
International career
Years	Team	Apps	(Points)
2009–10	Germany	2	(0)
- Correct as of 14 May 2017
Coaching career
- Years: Team
- 2012–2019: St Ives

Rob Elloway (born 9 November 1983) is a former German international rugby union player, playing for the Cornish Pirates in the RFU Championship and the German rugby team.

== Biography ==
Born in Rinteln, Germany, he has played rugby since 1990. He was born on a British Army base in Germany to an English father and a German mother, thereby qualifying to play for Germany.

Elloway, from a rugby playing family, his father Kevin Elloway, a Royal Engineers, represented his corps at rugby. He was educated at Sedbergh School and played junior rugby at Sedgley Park. Elloway made a number of appearances for Gloucester Rugby, spent some time at Pertemps Bees on loan in the 2006–07 season before joining the Cornish Pirates in 2007.

He made his debut for Germany against Russia on 2 May 2009.

== Stats ==
Rob Elloway's personal statistics in club and international rugby (incomplete):

=== Club ===
Year	Club	Division	Games	Tries	Con	Pen	DG	Place
2007–08	Cornish Pirates	National Division One	8	0	0	0	0	5th
2008–09	Cornish Pirates	National Division One	16	2	0	0	0	7th
2009–10	Cornish Pirates	RFU Championship	27	3	0	0	0	6th
2010–11	Cornish Pirates	RFU Championship	22	0	0	0	0	2nd — Runners-up
2011–12	Cornish Pirates	RFU Championship	21	2	0	0	0	3rd — Runners-up
2012–13	Cornish Pirates	RFU Championship	15	1	0	0	0	6th
2013–14	Cornish Pirates	RFU Championship			0	0	0	
2014–15	Cornish Pirates	RFU Championship			0	0	0	
2015–16	Cornish Pirates	RFU Championship			0	0	0	
2016–17	Cornish Pirates	RFU Championship			0	0	0	

- As of 15 April 2017

=== National team ===
Year	Team	Competition	Games	Points	Place
2008-2010	Germany	European Nations Cup First Division	2	0	6th — Relegated

- As of 14 May 2017
