= Greg Rawlinson =

NZ international rugby union player

- Born: Gregory Paul Rawlinson; 14 August 1978 (age 48) Durban, South Africa
- Height: 6 ft 7 in (2.01 m)
- Weight: 116 kg (18 st 4 lb; 256 lb)
- School: Durban High School
- University: Technikon Natal

Rugby union career
- Position: Lock
Amateur team(s)
Years	Team	Apps	(Points)
- Silverdale United R.F.C
Senior career
Years	Team	Apps	(Points)
2007–2010	Worcester	104	(25)
- Correct as of 5 January 2008
Provincial / State sides
Years	Team	Apps	(Points)
2003–07	North Harbour	45	
2002	Bay of Plenty	13	
-	Natal	-	
Super Rugby
Years	Team	Apps	(Points)
2004–07	Blues	39	
–	Sharks	1	
- Correct as of 26 April 2008
International career
Years	Team	Apps	(Points)
2006–07	New Zealand	4	(0)
- Correct as of 5 January 2008

Greg Rawlinson (born 14 August 1978 in Durban, South Africa) is a New Zealand international rugby union player. Rawlinson, who has made four appearances for the All Blacks, was born in South Africa and moved to New Zealand in 2002. The second row rejected overtures from the Springboks to remain in All Black contention and was rewarded with a call-up to face Ireland in June 2006. He became only the second ever South African-born All Black, the other being Andrew Mehrtens who was also born in Durban.

Rawlinson played for the Blues in Super Rugby and North Harbour Rugby Union in the Air New Zealand Cup, and has previously played for Bay of Plenty in the National Provincial Championship (NPC), the predecessor to the Air New Zealand Cup.

In 2005 he was named the North Harbour Player of the Year after playing in all 12 of North Harbour's matches that year. In the same year he was named the Air New Zealand Cup Most Valuable Player. He made his debut for the All Blacks in June 2006 against Ireland.

In 2007, New Zealand international Rawlinson moved to Worcester from Auckland Blues on a three-year deal during the summer, which will allow him to play in the Guinness Premiership.

In 2011, Greg left Worcester Warriors
