= Jonny Arr =

English rugby union player

Jonathan Arr
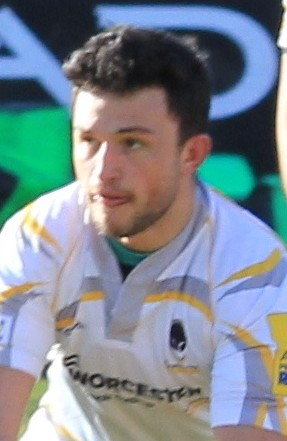
- Arr in 2014
- Born: 29 November 1988 (age 37) Worcester, Worcestershire
- Height: 1.80 m (5 ft 11 in)
- Weight: 84 kg (13 st 3 lb)
- School: RGS Worcester

Rugby union career
- Position: Scrum-half
Senior career
Years	Team	Apps	(Points)
2007–	Worcester Warriors	149	(60)

Jonny Arr (born 29 November 1988) is an English rugby union player for Worcester Warriors in the Aviva Premiership.

He plays as a scrum-half.

Arr was educated at the Royal Grammar School Worcester. Arr won international honours and was a part of the England Under 20 team that achieved the Grand Slam in the Six Nations of 2008.

He was rewarded for his outstanding form in 2009/10 when he picked up the Young Player of the Year and Most Improved Player of the Year awards.

Twelve months later, he went one better as he was named the Player-of-the-Year at the club's end of season dinner after his impressive role helping Warriors win promotion back to the Aviva Premiership. Arr continues to impress amongst England's elite and became a Warriors centurion when he made his one hundredth appearance for the club against Leicester Tigers in September 2012.

In January 2013, Arr had signed a new contract with the club.

Arr retired from professional rugby in 2019 and currently works as a mortgage advisor.
