= Rob Cook (rugby union) =

English rugby union footballer

- Born: 7 July 1984 (age 42) Lincoln, England
- Height: 1.83 m (6 ft 0 in)
- Weight: 89 kg (14 st 0 lb)
- School: Oakham School
- University: Worcester University

Rugby union career
- Position: Full-back
- Current team: Nuneaton
Senior career
Years	Team	Apps	(Points)
2007-2009	Nuneaton	51	(140)
2009-2012	Cornish Pirates	108	(1,028)
2012-2016	Gloucester Rugby	79	(278)
2016-2018	Nuneaton	30	(30)
2018-2025	Malvern	22	(30)

Rob Cook (born 7 July 1984 in Lincoln) is an English professional rugby union player who played for Premiership side Gloucester as a fullback. Former Deputy-Director of Sport and Director of Rugby at King Edward VI Grammar School Stratford-Upon-Avon.

== Early life ==
Rob Cook was born on 7 July 1984 in Lincoln, England. He attended Oakham School for two years in their 6th Form. In this time, he captained the rugby, cricket and football 1st teams. He won the Daily Mail Cup at Twickenham in 2002, scoring his first try in the process. He attended Worcester University, where he read sports studies and played for the rugby team. He gained Representative Honours with England Universities, Midlands U18s and England Counties.

== Club career ==
Cook joined Nuneaton R.F.C. in 2007. He remained with them for two seasons (2007/8 and 2008/9), making 51 first team appearances at Full Back or Fly-half and scoring 140 points. While at the Nuns he helped them to gain promotion to National Division Two when the club won the National Division Three North league title in 2008–09 as well as gaining selection for the England Counties XV due to his good form.

On 7 May 2009, Cook signed for RFU Championship side Cornish Pirates. Initially on the wing, he quickly moved to fly-half, before switching to full back where he remained for the rest of his Pirates tenure. He was a prolific points scorer. In each of his three seasons with the club (2009/10, 2010/11 and 2011/12), he was their highest scoring player, accumulating over 1,000 points. In 2011/12 he was named in the Championship "Dream Team" as he racked up a thousand points for the Pirates and over one hundred first team appearances.

Initially linked with a move to Sale Sharks, he signed a contract extension with Pirates. He rescinded this deal to play in the Premiership joining Gloucester Rugby in July 2012. On 18 October 2013, Cook signed a two-year contract extension to stay with Gloucester until the end of the 2015–16 season.

He has been known for his unusual stance before attempting a conversion or penalty.

== Honours ==
Nuneaton

- National Division Three North champions: 2008–09

Cornish Pirates

- RFU Championship runner-up (2 times): 2010–11, 2011–12

Malvern RFC

- Midlands 2 West (South) runner-up: 2017–18
- North Midlands Shield champions: 2017-18

County/Representative

- Selected for Midlands Under 18's
- Selected for England Universities
- Selected for England Counties XV: 2009
