= Aleki Lutui =

Tonga international rugby union player

Aleki Aho Lutui
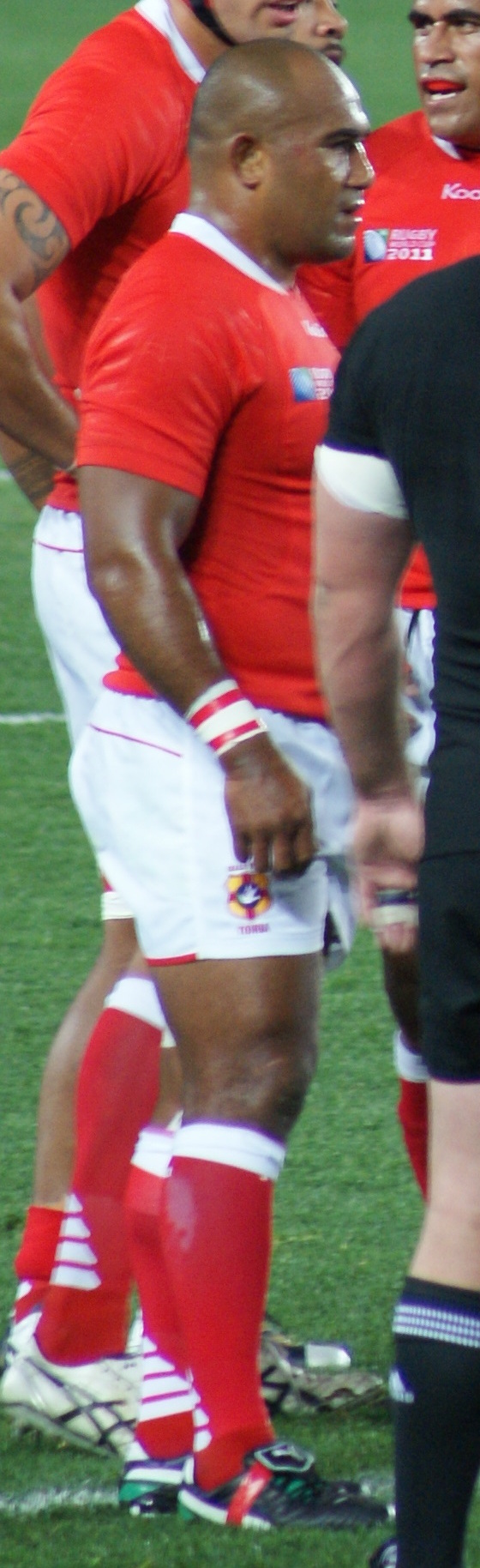
- New Zealand vs Tonga during 2011 Rugby World Cup
- Born: July 1, 1978 (age 48) Tofoa, Tonga
- Height: 1.80 m (5 ft 11 in)
- Weight: 108 kg (17 st 0 lb; 238 lb)

Rugby union career
- Position: Hooker
Senior career
Years	Team	Apps	(Points)
2006–2013	Worcester Warriors	181	(115)
2013–2014	Edinburgh Rugby	8	(0)
2014–2015	Gloucester Rugby	14	(0)
2015-	Ampthill	0	(0)
- Correct as of 24 November 2018
Provincial / State sides
Years	Team	Apps	(Points)
2005−2006	Bay of Plenty	15	(5)
- Correct as of 28 November 2014
Super Rugby
Years	Team	Apps	(Points)
2003–2006	Chiefs	29	(10)
International career
Years	Team	Apps	(Points)
1999–	Tonga	38	(25)
2004−2008	Pacific Islanders	7	(0)
- Correct as of 4 October 2015

Aleki Lutui (born 1 July 1978) in Tofoa, Tonga, is a Tongan rugby union international player. His position is hooker. He is currently playing club rugby for Ampthill in RFU Championship.

He previously played for Chiefs in the international Super 14 competition, as well as the Bay of Plenty in the Air New Zealand Cup. He was also the top try scorer for the Bay of Plenty in the 2002 National Provincial Championship (now, the Air New Zealand Cup).

He has appeared numerous times for his national team Tonga. He made his debut for Tonga in March 1999 in a match against Georgia.

He played for Tonga in their 2001 Pacific Rim campaign and later in the year toured Scotland and Wales. On June 5, 2004, he captained Tonga for the first time in a match against Fiji. In June 2005 he captained Tonga in four matches; two against both Fiji and Samoa.

He went on tour with the Pacific Islanders rugby union team in 2004 for a series of Tests against a number of southern rugby nations. He was included in the Pacific Nations tour to Europe in late 2006 and also played in the game against England at Twickenham in 2008.

Lutui joined Worcester in September 2006 on a two-year deal. The Tongan international was a former police officer before he took up rugby.

He has been a key figure for previous clubs in Super 14. He has since become a player Sixways.

Lutui, a ball carrier and hitter, was named in the Tonga squad for the 2007 Rugby World Cup in France, the 2011 Rugby World Cup in New Zealand and the 2015 Rugby World Cup in England.

On the 24 April 2013, Lutui signed a two-year deal which will bring him to Edinburgh Rugby in the Pro12.

However, on 20 June 2014, Lutui left Edinburgh to return to the Premiership to join Gloucester Rugby for next season's campaign.

For the 2015–16 season, Lutui signed for Ampthill playing in National League 1, joining a strong contingent of Tongan players.

== Personal life ==
His daughter Haineala Lutui is also a rugby union player.
