= Alex Grove =

Scotland international rugby union player

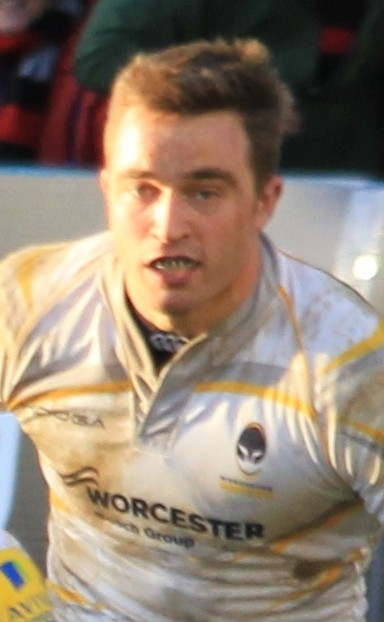
- Born: Alexander Grove; 30 November 1987 (age 38) Solihull, England
- Height: 1.80 m (5 ft 11 in)
- Weight: 95 kg (14 st 13 lb)
- School: Arnold Lodge School; Rugby School

Rugby union career
- Position: Centre
Senior career
Years	Team	Apps	(Points)
2006–2016	Worcester Warriors	153	(105)
2010	Edinburgh Rugby (loan)	10	(0)
2016–	Birmingham Moseley	0	(0)
International career
Years	Team	Apps	(Points)
2009–2010	Scotland A	7	(0)
2009–2010	Scotland	3	(0)

Alex Grove (born 30 November 1987) is a former Scottish rugby union player.

He plays as a centre. Grove previously played for Scotland at under-18, under-19, and under-20 level. He was also part of Scotland A's victorious IRB Nations Cup team in 2009, he received his first call-up to the full Scotland squad for the November internationals. An injury to Ben Cairns ensured that he started the first two games, which were wins over Fiji and Australia.

He attended Arnold Lodge School and Rugby School and was vice captain of the Rugby first XV.

His grandfather is Glasgow-born Ron Wylie, the former Aston Villa and Birmingham City footballer who also managed West Bromwich Albion, through which Alex qualifies for Scotland.

He signed for Edinburgh on a six-month loan from Worcester for first half of the 2010–11 season in a view to increase his chances of World Cup selection while Worcester were playing in the RFU Championship following relegation the previous season.

Grove returned to Sixways at the start of 2011 and, after clocking up his 50th appearance for Warriors, helped the club achieve its promotion aspirations back to the Aviva Premiership.

Grove once again cemented his place in the Warriors team the following season and made the joint second-most appearances alongside Andy Goode with 26.

He finished the season with three tries, including a crucial one in the 19–9 home victory over Newcastle Falcons, who were eventually relegated and securing the Worcester Warriors participation in the Aviva Premiership for the 2012–13 season.

On 11 July 2016, it was announced at Moseley Rugby FC's Club Forum that Alex had signed from Worcester for the 2016/2017 season, and the news was announced on Moseley's Official Twitter account shortly afterwards.

He is now a Rugby Coach at Solihull School
