= Chris Pennell =

England international rugby union player

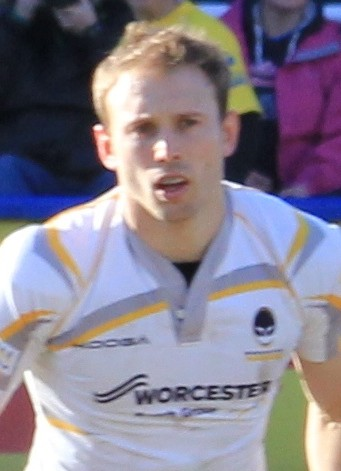
- Pennell in 2014
- Born: Christopher James Pennell; 26 April 1987 (age 39) Worcester, England
- Height: 1.85 m (6 ft 1 in)
- Weight: 95 kg (14 st 13 lb)
- School: Old Swinford Hospital

Rugby union career
- Position(s): Fullback, Wing, Centre
- Current team: Worcester Warriors
Senior career
Years	Team	Apps	(Points)
2007–	Worcester Warriors	207	(376)
- Correct as of 8 January 2019
International career
Years	Team	Apps	(Points)
2006	England U-19s	2	(5)
2015–	England Saxons	1	(0)
2014–	England	1	(0)
- Correct as of 17 June 2014

Chris Pennell (born 26 April 1987) is an English rugby union player. He currently plays for Worcester Warriors in the Aviva Premiership and also for the Dallas Jackals of Major League Rugby (MLR). He plays as a fullback or wing if needed. He's a former captain of Worcester, and currently resides in Worcester with his young family. Pennell is also an ambassador for type 1 diabetes, which he was diagnosed with at nineteen years old. He has played for England, earning 1 cap in 2014.

== Early life ==
He is the son of former England cricketer Graham Dilley. After his parents' marriage broke down, Pennell's mother married a British Army soldier, and Pennell took his surname. The family moved to Portadown, Northern Ireland, where he was educated at Millington Primary School, and was a member of the victorious Gilpin cup side in 1999. Returning to England, he was educated at Old Swinford Hospital School in Stourbridge where he played a key part in their run to the semi-finals of the Daily Mail Cup. Although head boy, he turned down the chance to captain the cricket first XI because of his A-levels.

== Club career ==
Having been offered a professional contract at Worcester Warriors, he delayed his offer of a university place, making his Guinness Premiership debut against Bath Rugby in 2007/08, and representing England at Under 19 level. He became a key performer for the club during the 2008–09 English Premiership campaign, until he suffered a serious knee injury in Europe. He returned to full fitness, and grabbed tries against Connacht Rugby and Olympus Rugby XV Madrid in Europe during the 2009/10 season, making 16 appearances during the campaign and scoring five tries.

After signing a new two-year deal in February 2010, he became club captain for the 2010-11 RFU Championship campaign. In that campaign Worcester won 30 out of 31 games. After winning the play-off against Bedford Blues at Sixways and both legs of the play-off final, Worcester secured promotion to the Premiership for the 2011–12 season.

Despite suffering injury at the start of the 2014/15 season, Pennell bounced back to play 17 times in Warriors' Championship-winning side, scoring 10 tries - including two in a man-of-the-match performance during the second leg of the final against Bristol Rugby.

He was also named man-of-the-match for England Saxons as they beat Ireland Wolfhounds in January 2015.

Pennell yet again showed his worth to the Club in the 2015/16 season, playing in every Aviva Premiership game and scoring two tries. The full-back was solid under the high ball and recorded the most metres made (1796) in a single season since Opta began recording stats.

The number 15 kept his consistency throughout 2016/17 and then 2017/18, the latter where he made 22 appearances and kicked 86 points.

The 2018/19 season marked Pennell's Testimonial Year.

== International career ==
In 2014, after a season of being Warriors' top performer, and the fans plus Dean Ryan himself supporting claims for Pennell to be in the England Squad, Pennell was called up to the England training squad by coach Stuart Lancaster, and in May he flew out with the squad for the Barbarians' fixtures. He made his England debut during the tour, coming off the bench in the 20–15 loss to New Zealand.
