= Lorne Ward =

South African rugby union player (born 1977)

- Born: Lorne Ward; February 16, 1977 (age 49) Pietermaritzburg, South Africa
- Height: 1.87 m (6 ft 2 in)
- Weight: 120 kg (260 lb)

Rugby union career
- Position: LH/TH Prop
Amateur team(s)
Years	Team	Apps	(Points)
1995–2000; 2011–2014	Maritzburg University, College Rovers, Rosslyn Park		
Senior career
Years	Team	Apps	(Points)
2002 - 2011	Harlequins, Bath, Toulon, London Welsh, Barbarians		

Lorne Ward (born 16 February 1977) is a South African rugby union prop who played for London Welsh, Harlequins, Bath and Toulon.

After retiring from professional rugby, he played for Rosslyn Park, before retiring completely at the end of the 2013/14 season.
