= Michael Hills (rugby union) =

English rugby union player

- Born: Michael Hills; 11 June 1985 (age 41) Doncaster, Yorkshire, England
- Height: 6 ft 1 in (1.85 m)
- Weight: 94 kg (14 st 11 lb)

Rugby union career
- Position: Flanker
- Current team: Doncaster Knights
Youth career
- Doncaster Knights
Senior career
Years	Team	Apps	(Points)
- Doncaster Knights
2005–2009	Sale Sharks	24	(5)
2009–2013	London Welsh	91	(35)
2013-	Doncaster Knights		
National sevens team
Years	Team		Comps
2006	England Sevens		Dubai

Michael Hills (born 11 June 1985 in Doncaster) is a rugby union player who plays at flanker for Doncaster Knights in the RFU Championship.

He represented England at the 2006 Under 21 Rugby World Championship. He has also played for the England Sevens.

Hills made 15 Premiership appearances for Sale Sharks and 24 in total, scoring one try against the Newcastle Falcons. In the 2005–2006 season, Hills made 2 appearances as Sale Sharks won their first ever Premiership title.

Hills signed for London Welsh in the summer of 2009.
