= Miles Benjamin =

English rugby union player

- Born: Miles Benjamin; 11 May 1988 (age 38) Solihull, West Midlands, England
- Height: 6 ft 0 in (1.83 m)
- Weight: 106 kg (16 st 10 lb)
- School: King Edward's School, Birmingham

Rugby union career
- Position: Wing
- Current team: Leicester Tigers
Youth career
- Worcester Warriors
Senior career
Years	Team	Apps	(Points)
2006–2012	Worcester Warriors	124	(300)
2012–2016	Leicester Tigers	29	(50)
- Correct as of 24 April 2012
International career
Years	Team	Apps	(Points)
2008	England U20	4	(20)
2010–2016	England Saxons	4	(30)
- Correct as of 24 April 2012

Miles Benjamin (born 11 May 1988 in Solihull, West Midlands, England) is a retired rugby union player who played at Wing for the Leicester Tigers & the Worcester Warriors in the English Aviva Premiership. He also played several other sports in his youth, representing the West Midlands at athletics and water polo, and Warwickshire at cricket. He received the Bache memorial prize for sportsman of the year from his school, King Edward's School, Birmingham.

== Club career ==
=== Worcester Warriors ===
Benjamin was signed by the Worcester Warriors Academy. After suffering a fractured fibula at the Middlesex Sevens in August 2006, Benjamin returned to full fitness with the help of the Worcester Warriors physios after a year out, returning in the 2007 Middlesex Sevens tournament. Cousin, Marissa Dzotsi, who helped him through it all and was by his side and watched him play a great game. Miles plays centre and wing.

His debut first-team start was against London Irish in the EDF Energy Cup, where he scored a try. His debut Premiership appearance was as a substitute against Leicester Tigers at Welford Road. He scored his first Premiership try against Newcastle Falcons in January 2008. He finished the season as the club's leading try-scorer with 15 and fourth in the Guinness Premiership charts with nine. Benjamin was jointly awarded the Young Player of the Year prize at Worcester's end of 2007–08 season awards. He was on the losing side in the final of the 2007–08 European Challenge Cup.

In November 2009, Benjamin agreed a two-year deal which will keep him at Worcester Warriors until 2012. Despite suffering relegation during the 2009–10 Guinness Premiership, Benjamin stayed with the club.

=== Leicester Tigers ===
Benjamin signed a deal with Leicester Tigers for the 2012/2013 season. In his first game for the tigers, in an 'A' League match at Northampton he suffered a serious neck injury which ruled him out for the rest of the 2012/2013 season. He finally made his 1st XV debut in October '13 against Ulster. His first scores for the tigers were in a Heineken Cup match against Montpellier where he scored a brace. He scored his first Premiership try for Leicester on 5 January in a 27–27 draw against Bath. He announced his retirement on 24 March 2016 due to a longstanding injury.

== International career ==
Benjamin played for the England Under-19 team at the 2007 IRB Under-19 World Championships. He also represented the England under-20 team at the 2008 IRB Under-20 World Cup, finishing as runners up.

He made his debut for the England Saxons against Ireland Wolfhounds in January 2010. He scored his first try at this level a week later, against Italy A.

== Post retirement career ==
In 2019, Benjamin joined the employment team of law firm Lewis Silkin LLP.
