= Marcel Garvey =

English rugby union player

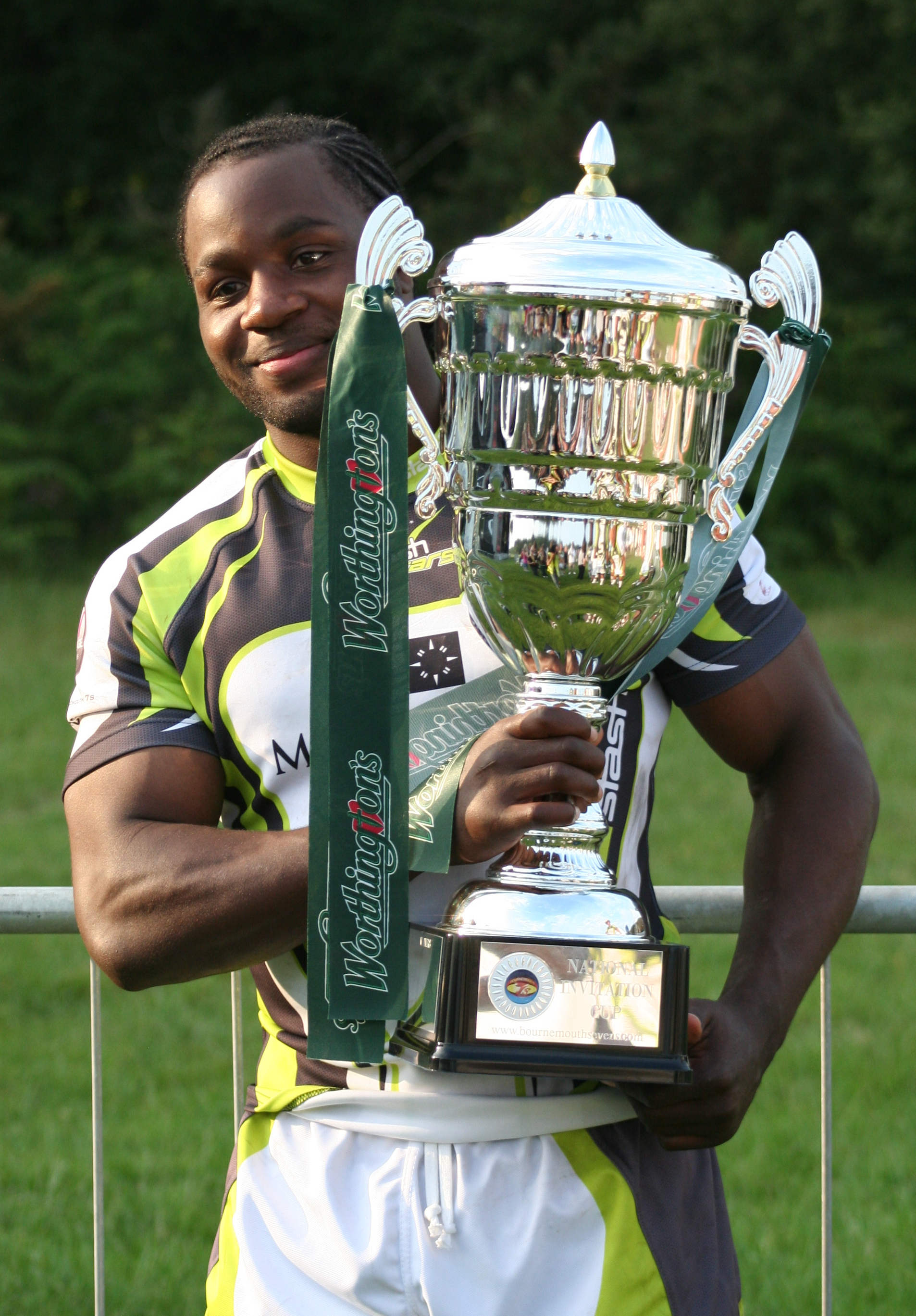
- Born: Marcel; 21 April 1983 (age 43) Gloucester, England
- Height: 1.75 m (5 ft 9 in)
- Weight: 88 kg (13 st 12 lb)

Rugby union career
- Position: Wing
Senior career
Years	Team	Apps	(Points)
2001–2006	Gloucester Rugby	95	(180)
2006–2012	Worcester Warriors	125	(230)
2012–2015	Castres Olympique	48	(45)
- Correct as of 24 January 2015
International career
Years	Team	Apps	(Points)
- England Saxons
–	Barbarians		
- Correct as of 5 January 2008
National sevens team
Years	Team		Comps
- England

Marcel Garvey (born 21 April 1983) is an English former rugby union player. He is first generation British born with Jamaican parents. He went to St Peter's High School, Gloucester, the same school as former Gloucester teammate Ryan Lamb.

Garvey started his career at Gloucester where he made a staggering start to life with a hat-trick of tries against Bristol. Whilst at Gloucester he started and scored a try in the 2003 Powergen Cup Final in which Gloucester defeated Northampton Saints.

Garvey signed a two-year deal with Worcester Warriors in May 2006 and played at Sixways for six seasons, including one season (2010–2011) spent in the Championship.

In 2012 Garvey moved to Castres Olympique in the South of France and remained with the club until retiring from professional rugby at the end of the 2014–2015 season.

The winger represented England A and England U21, being an integral part of the U21 World Cup team in 2004. He was also a member of the England Sevens set-up and played for the Barbarians.

He is former athlete Fiona May's cousin.

After retiring from rugby, Garvey began a new career in information technology.
