= Jake Abbott =

English rugby union player

- Born: Jake Abbott; 4 February 1988 (age 38) Worcester, England
- Height: 5 ft 11 in (1.80 m)
- Weight: 100 kg (15 st 10 lb)
- School: Worcester Sixth Form College

Rugby union career
- Position: Flanker
- Current team: Griffins Rugby
Senior career
Years	Team	Apps	(Points)
2008–14	Worcester	20	(35)
2014–	Griffins Rugby		
National sevens team
Years	Team		Comps
2009-	England		4

Jake Abbott (born 4 February 1988) is an English rugby union player who played most of his career as a flanker for Worcester Warriors in the English Premiership.

== Club career ==
=== Worcester ===
Malvern born and bred, Abbott has been connected with the Warriors since the age of 6 playing for the Minis/Juniors and is a product of the Warriors Academy system Abbott has worked his way through the entire system to become a first team star.

Abbott first broke into the team at Warriors in October 2008 when he started the EDF Energy Cup game with London Irish. Less than a month later he scored his first senior try in the same competition against Harlequins.

Following the Worcester Warriors relegation to the RFU Championship at the end of the 2009/2010 season, Abbott signed a one-year deal committing his future to helping the Warriors regain premiership rugby, but his efforts were cut short as he suffered a severe knee Injury in October 2010. Abbott was ruled out for the remainder of the season with an anterior cruciate ligament injury sidelining him for 6 months, having had a bright and promising start to the campaign.

In January 2011, it was confirmed that Abbott had committed a further two years to playing for the Worcester Warriors by signing a new deal which would keep him at the club until the end of the 2013 season.

Abbott was ruled out for the majority of the 2014 season with an anterior cruciate ligament injury to his right knee.

=== Griffins ===
In 2014, Abbott became one of America's first full-time professional rugby players by joining Griffins Rugby in Dallas, Texas on a three-year deal.

== International ==
Abbott was included in the England Sevens squad in December 2009, making his debut in the Dubai stage of the world sevens tournament. Abbott turned down an opportunity to play for England in the Commonwealth Games, however, wanting instead to focus on his performances for the Warriors.
