= Adam Balding =

English rugby union footballer

- Born: Adam Balding; 7 December 1979 (age 46) Coventry, England
- Height: 1.88 m (6 ft 2 in)
- Weight: 110 kg (17 st 5 lb)
- School: Caludon Castle

Rugby union career
- Position(s): Number eight, Flanker
Youth career
- Broad Street Rugby Club
Senior career
Years	Team	Apps	(Points)
1998-2004	Leicester Tigers	66	(10)
2004-2008	Gloucester Rugby	40	(5)
2007-2008	Leeds Carnegie (loan)	11	(0)
2008-2012	Newcastle Falcons	30	(5)
2011	Worcester Warriors	2	(0)
2012-2013	London Welsh	8	(0)
International career
Years	Team	Apps	(Points)
- England Saxons

Adam Balding (born 7 December 1979, in Coventry) is a retired English rugby union footballer, his most recent team he played for was London Welsh. He played as a number eight.

Balding came through Leicester Tigers academy and went on to make 66 appearances for the first XV. While there, he won the Premiership and Heineken Cup.

Balding was called up to the senior England squad for the 2002 tour of Argentina.

Balding signed for Gloucester for the start of the 2004–05 season. After some impressive performances in his debut season, he was made club captain towards the back end of the season. In Gloucester's first game of the 2005/06 season at Worcester, Balding was injured only a few minutes into the game. Balding returned from injury in early November, coming off the bench against Newcastle Falcons. He went on to make 16 appearances during the season; however he missed Gloucester's European Challenge Cup victory against London Irish at the end of the season. During the next 2 seasons Balding did not play regularly with stiff competition from James Forrester, Luke Narraway and Gareth Delve. During those two seasons he was loaned out to both Moseley and Leeds Carnegie.

Balding signed for Newcastle on 1 July 2008 for the start of the 2008–09 season. He signed for Worcester in February on a two-year deal.

In 2012, Balding signed a contract with Newcastle Falcons and left Worcester Warriors straight away. Balding suffered a serious Achilles injury in his third year at Gloucester which kept him out for 9 months; after returning to fitness game time was limited due to the form of the team. He then spent the rest of the 4th season on loan at Leeds.

Adam was signed to London Welsh for the 2012/13 season and had a great season.
