= Adam Black (rugby union) =

English rugby union player

- Born: 24 May 1975 (age 51) Romford, England
- Height: 1.88 m (6 ft 2 in)
- Weight: 126 kg (19 st 12 lb)

Rugby union career
- Position: Prop
Senior career
Years	Team	Apps	(Points)
2003–2009	Newport GD	163	(120)
2009 –	Worcester	30	(0)

Adam Black (born 24 May 1975 in Barking, England) is a rugby union player. A prop forward, Black has represented England at Under 21 level.

He played for London Wasps, Bedford, Sale Sharks, Ebbw Vale and Newport Gwent Dragons before joining Worcester Warriors in May 2009. Since retiring he has become a coach. He is currently head coach at Bude. He is also the co owner of East Thorne Cornwall alongside Naomi Black.He was also a contestant on 4 in a Bed
