= Craig Gillies =

Scottish rugby union player

- Born: 6 May 1976 (age 50) Paisley, Renfrewshire, Scotland
- Height: 2.0 m (6 ft 7 in)
- Weight: 112 kg (17 st 9 lb)
- University: Brunel University

Rugby union career
- Position: Lock
Senior career
Years	Team	Apps	(Points)
1994–1997	Bath Rugby		
1997–2000	Richmond		
2000–2001	Llanelli		
2001–2002	Gloucester	2	
2002 – 2013	Worcester	288	(10)
- Correct as of 23 July 2013
International career
Years	Team	Apps	(Points)
1998 –2008	England A		
- Correct as of 5 January 2008

Craig Gillies (born 6 May 1976) is a former English rugby union player. His final club was Worcester Warriors in the Aviva Premiership. He played as a lock.

Gillies was born in Paisley and grew up in Tiverton, Devon. He joined Bath Rugby following a trial in April 1994 and made three first team appearances during the 1995–1996 season. He moved on to join Richmond for the 1997–1998 season with the then Bath coach Andy Robinson feeling that the club's signing of the Argentinian international German Llanes would prevent Gillies from getting the sufficient game time to allow him to fully develop his potential. Gillies moved on to join Llanelli before signing for Gloucester in 2001/02 and then Warriors in the summer of 2002. Whilst at Gloucester he was a replacement in the 2002 Zurich Championship Final (the year before winning the play-offs constituted winning the English title) in which Gloucester defeated Bristol.

Gillies - who is the leading appearance maker at Worcester in the modern era after beating the previous record of 222 held by Tony Windo - was a key part of the unbeaten National Division One promotion winning team of 2003/04.

The giant lock is widely regarded as one of the best line-out takers in the top-flight and won England A honours in 2000.

A leading figure both on and off the field, Gillies made twenty-nine appearances during the 2009/10 campaign – more than any other Warrior.

Gillies excelled again for Warriors in the RFU Championship during 2010/11, making twenty-eight appearances to cement a key role in the pack

The second row agreed a new two-year deal in 2011 and is keen to continue to dominate the airwaves for Warriors.

He retired from Rugby in 2013.

Gillies lost all his body hair to alopecia in 2002.
