= Rhodri McAtee =

Welsh rugby union footballer

- Born: Rhodri McAtee; 2 August 1984 (age 42) Newport, Wales
- Height: 1.78 m (5 ft 10 in)
- Weight: 82.6 kg (13 st 0 lb; 182 lb)

Rugby union career
- Position: Wing
Senior career
Years	Team	Apps	(Points)
- Camberley
- Worcester Warriors
2004–12	Cornish Pirates		
2012–	Plymouth Albion		
International career
Years	Team	Apps	(Points)
- Wales Sevens
–	Barbarians		
Medal record
Men's rugby sevens
Representing Wales
Rugby World Cup Sevens
Gold medal – first place	2009 Dubai	Team competition

Rhodri McAtee (born 2 August 1984 in Newport) is a Welsh rugby union player. A winger, he was selected for the victorious Wales Sevens squad to play at the 2009 Rugby World Cup Sevens. He was released by the Pirates at the end of the 2011–12 season and in 2012–13 will play for Plymouth Albion in the RFU Championship.

== Career record ==
Cornish Pirates

Season	Starts	Rep	Tries	Cons	Pens	Drop	Pts
2004–05			2				10
2005–06			6				30
2006–07	26	1	16	0	0	0	80
2007–08	17	10	8	0	0	0	40
2008–09	16	4	7	0	0	0	35
2009–10	20	3	6	0	0	0	30
2010–11	15	6	9	0	0	0	45
2011–12	8	4	3	0	0	0	15
