= Joe Carlisle =

English rugby union player

- Born: Joe Carlisle; 4 December 1987 (age 38) Swindon, United Kingdom
- Height: 1.88 m (6 ft 2 in)
- Weight: 95 kg (14 st 13 lb)
- School: St Johns School Marlborough

Rugby union career
- Position: Fly-half
Senior career
| Years | Team | Apps | (Points) |
| 2007–2013 | Worcester Warriors | 92 | (477) |
| 2013–2014 | Wasps | 26 | (140) |
| 2014–2015 | Benetton Treviso | 14 | (61) |
| 2015–2016 | London Welsh | 29 | (155) |
| 2016-2017 | USA Perpignan | 27 | (184) |
| 2017-2019 | Old Elthamians | 28 | (161) |
| 2019– | Yorkshire Carnegie | | |

Joe Carlisle (born 4 December 1987) is an English rugby union player for Rotherham Titans in National League 2 North.

Joe is a Worcester Warriors Academy product who made his league debut for Warriors in 2008 before appearing off the bench in the European Challenge Cup final against Bath Rugby at Kingsholm. His father is called Richard and his mother Louise.

The Swindon-born player enjoyed a most successful season at Sixways during the 2010/11 campaign, racking-up thirty-three appearances and 212 points.

The points-tally included a stunning twenty-eight point haul against Newport RFC in the British & Irish Cup.

During the 2012/13 season, Carlisle went two better as he scored a sensational thirty points against Femi-CZ VEA Rovigo in the Amlin Challenge Cup.

With that total, he also became Warriors' highest ever individual points scorer in a European game, beating previous record holder's Shane Drahn who scored twenty-one points in 2008.

Predominantly a fly half, Carlisle can also play at centre.

In January 2013, it was announced that Carlisle will join Wasps ahead of the 2013–14 season. After he left Wasps, Carlisle joined Italy region Benetton Treviso.

On 29 April 2015, Carlisle returns to England to join London Welsh in the RFU Championship from the 2015–16 season.

On 29 Décember 2016, Joe move to USA Perpignan, in France (Pro D2). Carlisle returned to England to join third division club Old Elthamians in National League 1 from the 2017–18 season.

On 16 September 2019, Carlisle returns to the RFU Championship with Yorkshire Carnegie from the 2019–20 season.
