= Dale Rasmussen =

- Born: Dale Aloalii Rasmussen; 5 July 1977 (age 49) Auckland, New Zealand
- Height: 1.88 m (6 ft 2 in)
- Weight: 101 kg (15 st 13 lb)
- School: Mount Albert Grammar School
- University: Auckland University

Rugby union career
- Position: Centre
Senior career
Years	Team	Apps	(Points)
-2003	Ponsonby		
2003-2004	Exeter	14	(15)
2004–2012	Worcester	199	(90)
Provincial / State sides
Years	Team	Apps	(Points)
-2003	Bay of Plenty		
International career
Years	Team	Apps	(Points)
2003–2004	Samoa	9	(0)

Dale Rasmussen (born 5 July 1977) is a former Samoan international rugby union player. He played as an outside centre. Rasmussen joined Warriors from Exeter Chiefs in the summer of 2004 and made his debut in the club's first-ever Premiership match against Newcastle Falcons.

The Samoan international cemented his place in the side straight away and was a consistent player throughout the 2005/06 season, playing 23 league and cup games throughout the campaign. His performances and commitment was recognised by the Warriors coaching staff when they selected him as the Player of the Year, the award for which he picked up at the club's end of season awards celebration.

Last season Rasmussen signed a new three-year deal, which will keep him at Sixways until 2010.

In 2012, Ramussen announced that he would leave Worcester Warriors and retire from Rugby.
