= Ollie Frost =

English rugby union player (b.1989)

- Born: 2 December 1989 (age 36) Hereford, England
- Height: 1.78 m (5 ft 10 in)
- Weight: 92 kg (14 st 7 lb)
- School: Bromsgrove School.

Rugby union career
- Position: scrum -half
- Current team: London Welsh
Senior career
Years	Team	Apps	(Points)
2009-2013	Worcester Warriors		
2013-	London Welsh		

Ollie Frost (born 2 December 1989) is an English rugby union player, who currently plays for London Welsh.

He plays as a scrum-half.

He attended Bromsgrove School from 2006 – 2008.

The Hereford-born back first broke into the first team at Sixways during the 2009/10 season and impressed the coaching staff with his natural talent and desire to improve.

The Warriors Academy product made five appearances in cup competitions during his first full season, after making his senior debut when he came off the replacements bench against Olympus Rugby Madrid XV in the Spanish capital.

Frost, who has also impressed in the A League, made a first senior start for Warriors against Scarlets in the LV= Cup and grabbed a senior try against Newcastle Falcons in the same competition at Sixways in November 2010.

In 2013, it was confirmed that Frost would leave Worcester and go to London Welsh
