= Chris Fortey =

English rugby union player

- Born: 25 August 1975 (age 51) Gloucester, England
- Height: 1.83 m (6 ft 0 in)
- Weight: 108 kg (17 st 0 lb)
- Notable relative: Lee Fortey (brother)

Rugby union career
- Position: Hooker
Senior career
Years	Team	Apps	(Points)
1996–2005	Gloucester	134	(20)
2005–2012	Worcester	120	(10)

Chris Fortey (born 25 August 1975 in Gloucester) is a retired English rugby union player for Worcester Warriors in the Aviva Premiership. He previously played for Gloucester. Whilst at Gloucester he was a replacement in both the 2002 Zurich Championship Final (the year before winning the play-offs constituted winning the English title) in which Gloucester defeated Bristol Shoguns, and the 2003 Powergen Cup Final in which Gloucester defeated Northampton Saints.

Fortey was called up to the senior England squad for the 2001 England rugby union tour of North America.

In 2011, Fortey was torn between the idea whether to retire or not. Deciding to continue playing until the end of the 2012 season, he then retired.

Chris is the identical twin off Lee Fortey who has also played for Worcester.

He played as a hooker.
