= Matt Hopper =

English rugby union player

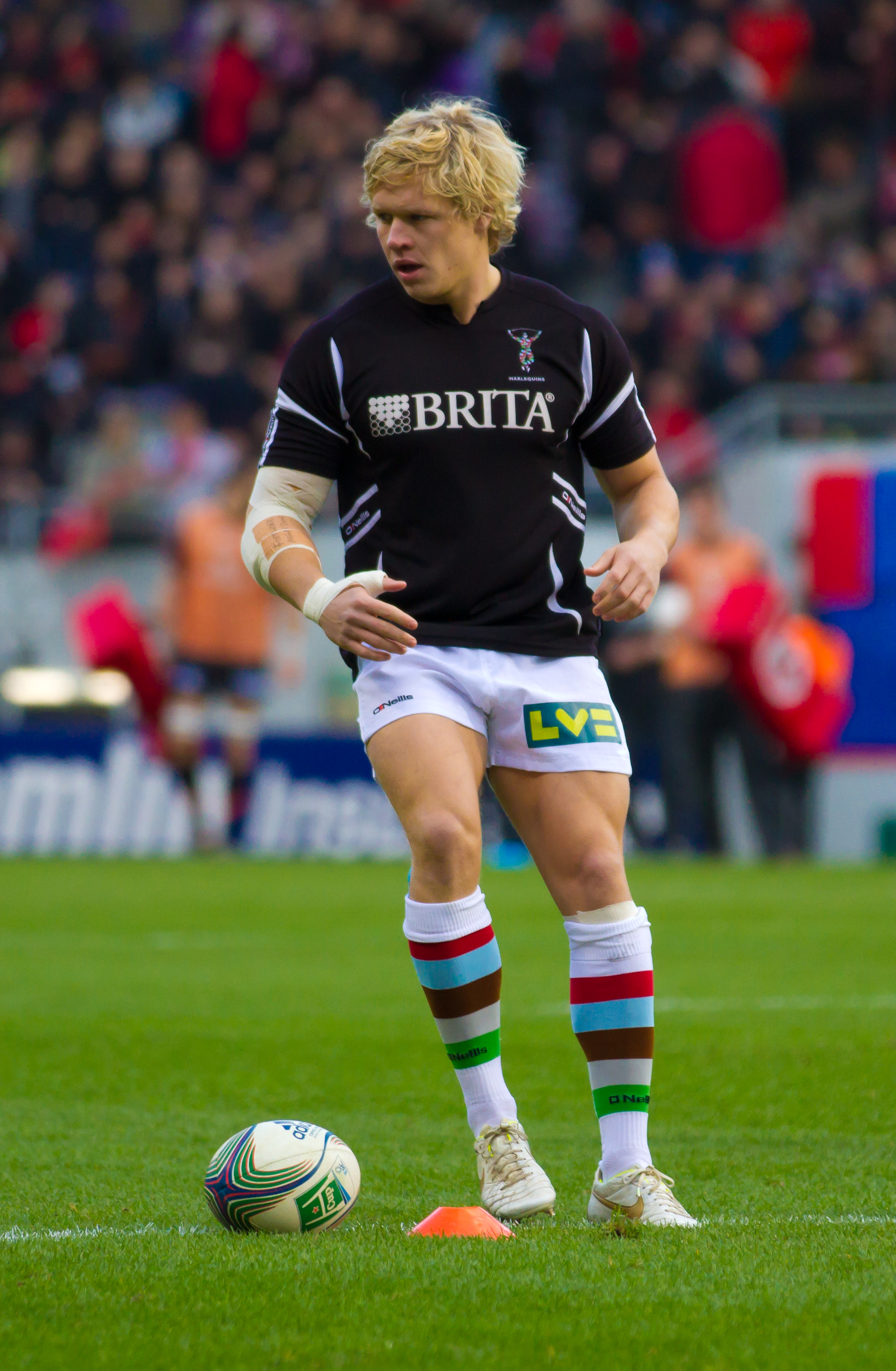
- Born: Matthew Aaron Hopper; 29 January 1985 (age 41) Exeter, England
- Height: 1.78 m (5 ft 10 in)
- Weight: 90 kg (14 st 2 lb; 198 lb)
- School: Exeter School
- University: Cardiff University

Rugby union career
- Position: Centre / Fullback
- Current team: Harlequins
Senior career
Years	Team	Apps	(Points)
2007–2008	Manly	15	(45)
2008–2010	Plymouth Albion	30	
2010–2011	Cornish Pirates	28	(45)
2011–2017	Harlequins	113	(53)
2017–	Oyonnax	16	(10)
International career
Years	Team	Apps	(Points)
2012 - 2014	England Saxons	2	(0)

Matt Hopper (born 29 January 1985) is a former rugby union player for Harlequins in the Aviva Premiership. He primarily played as a Centre but can also cover Fullback.

Hopper started playing mini rugby at age 10 and continued through school and in the junior teams of the Exeter Chiefs, following in the footsteps of his father Keith who captained Exeter during the 1960s. He also played for Wessex and, while studying, for Cardiff University. After graduation Matt spent a year in Australia and played for Manly, before returning to the UK and joining Plymouth Albion.

Following two years with Plymouth, Hopper joined Cornish Pirates in 2010. Pirates were defeated over the two legs of the 2010–11 RFU Championship Final by Worcester, but the team's dynamic playing style had attracted attention from several Premiership clubs and Hopper was recruited to join Harlequins in April 2011.

Hopper made his competitive debut for Quins against Sale Sharks in round 5 of the Aviva Premiership and gained his first start against Gloucester in the Heineken Cup, scoring a try. An injury to George Lowe gave Matt a run in the first XV and he played seven full matches during December 2011 and January 2012, including an away victory against French giants Toulouse. Hopper impressed many during this period and was rewarded with a call up to Stuart Lancaster's Saxons squad to face the Irish Wolfhounds on 28 January 2012.

He was a replacement for Harlequins in their 2011–12 Premiership final victory over Leicester Tigers.

ON 13 April 2017, Hopper to leave Harlequins and join French club Oyonnax in the Top 14 from the 2017–18 season.
