= Simon Whatling =

English rugby union player

- Born: 16 September 1984 (age 42) Bath, England
- Height: 1.75 m (5 ft 9 in)
- Weight: 93 kg (205 lb)

Rugby union career
- Position(s): Centre, Fly-half
Senior career
Years	Team	Apps	(Points)
2004–2007	Worcester	22	(12)
2007–2009	Cornish Pirates		
2009–	London Welsh		

Simon Whatling (born 16 September 1984) is an English rugby union player, who plays for London Welsh in the Aviva Championship. Whatling had previously played for the Worcester Warriors and the Cornish Pirates. He plays at Centre or Fly-half.
