= Ben Russell (rugby union, born 1983) =

English rugby union footballer

- Born: Benjamin T. Russell; 10 January 1983 (age 43) Halifax, Yorkshire, England
- Height: 5 ft 11 in (1.80 m)
- Weight: 13 st 4 lb (186 lb; 84 kg)
- School: Forest School (Winnersh); Wellington College, Berkshire

Rugby union career
- Position: Flanker / Number Eight
- Current team: London Welsh
Youth career
- 1997–2002: Saracens Academy
Senior career
Years	Team	Apps	(Points)
2002–2007	Saracens		
2007–2011	Racing Metro		
2011-	London Welsh		
National sevens team
Years	Team		Comps
- England Sevens
Medal record
Men's rugby sevens
Representing England
Commonwealth Games
Silver medal – second place	2006 Melbourne	Team competition

Benjamin T. Russell (born 10 January 1983 in Halifax, West Yorkshire) is a rugby union player who plays at No. 8 or Flanker for London Welsh. He previously played for Saracens and Racing Metro. He has also played internationally for the England Sevens.
