= Carl Rimmer =

English rugby union player

- Born: Carl Rimmer; 29 April 1986 (age 40) Banbury, Oxfordshire
- Height: 1.83 m (6 ft 0 in)
- Weight: 118 kg (18 st 8 lb)
- School: The Woodlands School, Coventry

Rugby union career
- Position: Prop
Youth career
- Earlsdon RFC
Senior career
Years	Team	Apps	(Points)
2005–2006	Nuneaton	21	(0)
2006–2008	Coventry	46	(10)
2009–2012	Cornish Pirates	80	(20)
2012–2018	Exeter Chiefs	132	(30)

Carl Rimmer (born 29 April 1986 in Banbury, England) is a retired Rugby Union player who played for Exeter Chiefs in Premiership Rugby.

Rimmer was equally capable of playing at both loosehead and tighthead prop and made his debut for Exeter against London Welsh on 16 September 2012, subsequently starting at both loosehead and tighthead. Rimmer joined Exeter from fellow westcountry side Cornish Pirates and was qualified to play for both England or Wales. He was a replacement as Exeter Chiefs defeated Wasps to be crowned champions of the 2016–17 English Premiership.
