= Paul Andrew (rugby union) =

British rugby union player

Paul Andrew (born 14 February 1989, in Truro, England) is a British rugby union player who played for Cornish Pirates in the RFU Championship. At 6 feet tall and weighing 17 stone, Andrew plays as a prop.

Andrew first joined the Cornish Pirates in 2008, and later moved to the Worcester Warriors in 2013.

In 2014, Andrew was re-signed to the Cornish Pirates on a two-year contract.

He made his league debut for the Pirates when he was nineteen years of age and went on to represent Cornwall, Cornwall U20 and England Conference U18.
