= Jonny Bentley =

New Zealand rugby union player (born 1986)

- Born: Jonny Bentley; 1 July 1986 (age 40) Upper Hutt, New Zealand
- Height: 1.70 m (5 ft 7 in)
- Weight: 78 kg (12 st 4 lb)

Rugby union career
- Position: Fly-half
Amateur team(s)
| Years | Team | Apps | (Points) |
- Hutt Old Boys Marist RFC
Senior career
| Years | Team | Apps | (Points) |
| 2009–2013 | Cornish Pirates | 57 | (292) |
| 2013 | Yorkshire Carnegie (loan) | 5 | (11) |
| 2013–2014 | Gloucester Rugby | 2 | (3) |
| 2014−2015 | Jersey | 21 | (52) |
| 2016 | Ealing Trailfinders | | |
| 2016– | Chinnor | | |
- Correct as of 14 July 2015
Provincial / State sides
| Years | Team | Apps | (Points) |
| 2015− | Wellington Lions | 12 | (51) |
- Correct as of 23 October 2015

Jonny Bentley (born 1 July 1986) is a New Zealand rugby union player who plays at fly-half for Chinnor.

Bentley original club was Hutt Old Boys Marist RFC in New Zealand, where as a Wellington Academy member he played for Wellington U21s and the Wellington XV. In 2007 he was the WRFU Club's 'Rugby Player of the Year'.

After playing for Yokogawa Musashino Atlastars, in Japan, he signed for the Cornish Pirates in the RFU Championship for the 2009–10 season. He made a total of 57 appearances with the Pirates where he helped them to win the British and Irish Cup in 2010. Unfortunately, he suffered an Achilles tendon tear following abductor muscle trouble and did not play for seventeen months returning for the Pirates during the 2012–13 season.

On 19 June 2013, it was announced that Bentley would join Gloucester Rugby in the Aviva Premiership on a one-year contract for the 2013–14 season. On 6 June 2014, Bentley returned to the RFU Championship as he signed a contract to join Jersey for the 2014–15 season. On 28 April 2015 Jonny Bentley confirmed his departure from Jersey

On 28 May 2015, Bentley returned to New Zealand to sign for his province Wellington Lions for the 2015 ITM Cup campaign. Bentley returned to the RFU Championship with Ealing Trailfinders for the rest of the 2015–16 season.

From the 2016–17 season, Bentley has been playing for Chinnor who compete in National League 2 South.
