= Sam Betty =

- Born: 19 November 1986 (age 39) Bristol, England
- Height: 1.88 m (6 ft 2 in)
- Weight: 95 kg (14 st 13 lb)

Rugby union career
- Position: Flanker
- Current team: Worcester Warriors
Senior career
Years	Team	Apps	(Points)
2010-2011	Cornish Pirates		
2011-	Worcester Warriors		

Sam Betty (born 19 November 1986) is an English rugby union player for Worcester Warriors in the RFU Championship.

He plays as a flanker.

Dynamic flanker Sam Betty joined Worcester Warriors after agreeing a move from Cornish Pirates in July 2011. The flanker, who has represented Cornwall at Under-20 level, continued his eye-catching development by starting twenty-four of the thirty matches he appeared in during the 2009/10 season and made his 100th appearance for Pirates in February 2010 against Nottingham at Camborne.

His performance against Worcester in the second leg of the RFU Championship final in 2011, which proved to be his last for Pirates, was so impressive that Warriors Head Coach Richard Hill instantly brought him to Sixways.
