= Drew Locke =

English rugby union player

- Born: 11 September 1986 (age 40) Braintree, England
- Height: 1.80 m (5 ft 11 in)
- Weight: 89 kg (14 st 0 lb)

Rugby union career
- Position: Centre
- Current team: London Scottish
Senior career
| Years | Team | Apps | (Points) |
- Coventry R.F.C.
- Exeter Chiefs
| 2010–2012 | Cornish Pirates | 28 | (60) |
| 2012–2013 | Gloucester Rugby | 3 | (0) |
| 2013–2015 | Jersey | | |
| 2015– | London Scottish | 5 | (10) |
International career
| Years | Team | Apps | (Points) |
- England Students

Drew Locke (born 11 September 1986) is a rugby union player for London Scottish. His position of choice is at centre but is also able to play at fullback. His previous clubs were Jersey, Cornish Pirates, Coventry and the Exeter Chiefs.

Drew Locke joined Aviva Premiership side Gloucester Rugby from Cornish Pirates on a one-year contract from September 2012. Following his release from Gloucester, Locke returned to the RFU Championship to sign for Jersey.

Drew Locke is the brother of Gareth Locke, a Made in Chelsea regular cast member and businessman. Gareth is married to Ollie Locke, another Made in Chelsea series regular and actor, as of November 2020.
