= Ian Nimmo =

English rugby union player

- Born: Ian Nimmo; 25 July 1985 (age 41) Harlow, Essex, England
- Height: 201 cm (6 ft 7 in)
- Weight: 118 kg (18 st 8 lb)
- School: High School of Dundee

Rugby union career
- Current team: London Welsh
Senior career
Years	Team	Apps	(Points)
- Leicester Tigers
2010-2012	Cornish Pirates	60	(15)
2012-2013	NG Dragons	22	(0)
2013	London Irish (loan)		
2013-	London Welsh		

Ian Nimmo (born 25 July 1985) is a Scottish rugby union player who plays as a lock forward. Nimmo moved to Perthshire, Scotland at the age of 14. He has been capped by Scotland at Under 19 and Under 20 levels and was included in the Scotland under 20 squad for the 2005 and 2009 Junior World Cups.

In July 2012 Nimmo joined Welsh regional team Newport Gwent Dragons. having previously played for Leicester Tigers and Cornish Pirates.

In September 2013 Nimmo joined London Irish on a short loan deal

On 7 November 2013, Ian Nimmo had signed to London Welsh in the RFU Championship.
