= Gavin Cattle =

Welsh rugby union player

- Born: Gavin Cattle; 5 April 1980 (age 46) Bridgend, Wales
- Height: 175 cm (5 ft 9 in)
- Weight: 85 kg (13 st 5 lb)

Rugby union career
- Position: Scrum-half
Senior career
Years	Team	Apps	(Points)
2000–2003	Birmingham		
2003–2004	Orrell		
2004	Rotherham		
2004–2007	Cornish Pirates		
2007–2009	Llanelli RFC	12	(5)
2009–2016	Cornish Pirates		
- Correct as of 12 March 2019
Provincial / State sides
Years	Team	Apps	(Points)
2007–2009	Scarlets	26	(5)
International career
Years	Team	Apps	(Points)
2014	Barbarians	1	(0)
Coaching career
- Years: Team
- 2016–: Cornish Pirates (co-coach)

Gavin Cattle (born 5 April 1980) is a Welsh former rugby union player, and the current co-coach of the Cornish Pirates along with Alan Paver. As a player, Cattle played as a scrum-half and captained the Cornish Pirates to the 2007 EDF Energy Trophy with a 19–16 win over the Exeter Chiefs at Twickenham Stadium.
