= Ben Gulliver =

English rugby union player

- Born: 16 March 1981 (age 45) Coventry, West Midlands, England
- Height: 1.96 m (6 ft 5 in)
- Weight: 110 kg (17 st 5 lb)

Rugby union career
- Current team: Bedford Blues
Senior career
Years	Team	Apps	(Points)
2011–2012	Worcester Warriors		
2012	Bedford Blues		

Ben Gulliver (born 16 March 1981) is a rugby union player who currently plays for Ampthill in National League 1. His preferred position is lock. His stature makes him a big threat at line-outs. He began his career at Coventry, and following a brief spell at Saracens (where he represented England Students), Gulliver made the move to the West Country to join Plymouth Albion. He impressed there until a broken leg led to a lengthy spell on the sidelines. In summer 2008, Ben moved across the Tamar to local rivals Cornish Pirates. After impressing in 30 appearances in his first campaign, his second season (2009–10) was beset by injury but ultimately successful as Ben contributed to Cornish Pirates' victory in the inaugural British and Irish Cup.

In September, Cornish Pirates announced they had agreed to a three-month loan deal for Ben to go to Leicester Tigers as temporary cover for injured England international locks Geoff Parling and Louis Deacon.

At the end of the 2011–12 season, Ben left Worcester Warriors after one season and went to Bedford Blues.
