= Steve Winn =

- Born: 6 November 1981 (age 45)

Rugby union career
Senior career
Years	Team	Apps	(Points)
1996–?	Bridgend RFC		
2000–2003	Swansea RFC		
2004–2005	Newport RFC		
2010–?	Cornish Pirates		
Provincial / State sides
Years	Team	Apps	(Points)
2003–2005	Newport Gwent Dragons	29	(29)
International career
Years	Team	Apps	(Points)
- Wales Youth
–	Wales A		
–	Wales U21		
–	Wales 7s		
–	Wales Development		
–	Wales 16		
–	Wales 18		
–	Wales 19		

Steve Winn (born 6 November 1981) is a Welsh rugby union player. A centre, he has represented Wales A and currently plays his club rugby for the Cornish Pirates having joined from the Welsh regional team Newport Gwent Dragons where he made 29 appearances.

Winn previously played for Bridgend RFC, Swansea RFC and Newport RFC.
