= 2011–12 European Challenge Cup pool stage =

2011–12 Amlin Challenge Cup pool stage
- Season: 2011–12 Amlin Challenge Cup
- Date: 10 November 2011 – 22 January 2012

Qualifiers
- Seed 1: (France) Stade Français
- Seed 2: (France) Brive
- Seed 3: (France) Toulon
- Seed 4: (England) London Wasps
- Seed 5: (France) Biarritz (from HC)
- Seed 6: (England) Harlequins (from HC)
- Seed 7: (Wales) Scarlets (from HC)
- Seed 8: (England) Exeter Chiefs

The 2011–12 Amlin Challenge Cup pool stage was the opening stage of the 16th season of the European Challenge Cup, the second-tier competition for European rugby union clubs. It began on 10 November 2011 with two matches and ended on 22 January 2012.

Twenty teams participated in this phase of the competition; they were divided into five pools of four teams each, with each team playing the others home and away. Competition points were earned using the standard bonus point system. The pool winners advanced to the knockout stage, where they were joined by three entrants from the Heineken Cup pool stage. These teams then competed in a single-elimination tournament that ended with the final at the Twickenham Stoop in London on 18 May 2012.

== Results ==
All times are local to the game location.

Key to colours
Winner of each pool advances to quarterfinals. Seed # in parentheses.

=== Pool 1 ===
Team	P	W	D	L	Tries for	Tries against	Try diff	Points for	Points against	Points diff	TB	LB	Pts
(France) Stade Français (1)	6	6	0	0	33	5	+28	241	43	+198	5	0	29
(England) Worcester Warriors	6	4	0	2	30	9	+21	194	95	+99	4	0	20
(Romania) București Wolves	6	2	0	4	12	27	−15	102	184	−82	2	0	10
(Italy) Crociati Parma	6	0	0	6	4	38	−34	36	251	−215	0	0	0

10 November 2011
19:45

Worcester Warriors (England)	14–23	(France) Stade Français
Try: Pennell 5' c Garvey 11' c Con: Carlisle (2/2)	Report	Try: Sackey 61' m Pen: Contepomi (6/7) 31', 40', 45', 50', 57', 75'

Sixways Stadium, Worcester
Attendance: 8,121
Referee: Tim Hayes (Wales)

13 November 2011
15:00

București Wolves (Romania)	34–7	(Italy) Crociati Parma
Try: Apostol (3) 6' c, 21' c, 60' c Munteanu 74' c Con: Vlaicu (4/4); Pen: Vlaicu (2/2) 8', 57'	Report	Try: Festuccia 38' c Con: Zucconi (1/1)

Stadionul Arcul de Triumf, Bucharest
Attendance: 1,000
Referee: Cedric Marchat (France)

18 November 2011
19:00

Stade Français (France)	49–3	(Romania) București Wolves
Try: Burban 4' c Fainifo 14' c Kelleher 19' c Sempéré 26' c Turinui (2) 36' c, 50' c Bonneval 65' c Con: Fillol (6/6); Plisson (1/1)	Report	Pen: Vlaicu (1/1) 40'

Stade Sébastien Charléty, Paris
Attendance: 5,800
Referee: Luke Pearce (England)

19 November 2011
20:30

Crociati Parma (Italy)	3–34	(England) Worcester Warriors
Pen: Zucconi (1/1) 32'	Report	Try: Drauniniu 13' c Pennell (2) 24' c, 34' m Arscott 28' m Gulliver 79' c Con: Gray (2/4); Goode (1/1); Pen: Gray (1/1) 5'

Stadio XXV Aprile, Parma
Attendance: 300
Referee: Andrew McMenemy (Scotland)

10 December 2011
16:00

Crociati Parma (Italy)	0–57	(France) Stade Français
	Report	Try: Turinui 2' c Arias 8' m Rokobaro (3) 35' m, 52' c, 73' c Parisse (2) 45' c, 65' c Burban 68' m Camara 70' c Con: Warwick (1/3); Plisson (5/6)

Stadio XXV Aprile, Parma
Attendance: 1,000
Referee: Neil Hennessy (Wales)

11 December 2011
15:00

București Wolves (Romania)	13–24	(England) Worcester Warriors
Try: Surugiu 56' c Con: Vlaicu (1/1); Pen: Vlaicu (2/2) 10', 23'	Report	Try: Drauniniu 15' c Abbott 25' m Claassens 64' m Currie 79' c Con: Gray (1/2); Goode (1/2)

Stadionul Arcul de Triumf, Bucharest
Attendance: 2,000
Referee: Marius Mitrea (Italy)

15 December 2011
20:30

Stade Français (France)	45–3	(Italy) Crociati Parma
Try: Camara 18' m Sempéré 35' c Papé (2) 44' c, 50' m de Malmanche 60' c Lyons 76' c Rabadan 80' c Con: Fillol (3/5); Plisson (2/2)	Report	Pen: Ruffolo (1/1) 9'

Stade Sébastien Charléty, Paris
Attendance: 2,500
Referee: Andrew Macpherson (Scotland)

17 December 2011
15:00

Worcester Warriors (England)	57–13	(Romania) București Wolves
Try: penalty try 14' c Garvey (2) 17' m, 31' m Dacres 19' c Lutui 41' m Pennell 45' c Drauniniu 55' c Benjamin 68' c Abbott 71' c Con: Carlisle (2/4); Goode (4/5)	Report	Try: Popârlan 51' c Con: Florea (1/1); Pen: Vlaicu (2/2) 1', 22'

Sixways Stadium, Worcester
Attendance: 6,700
Referee: Stefano Penne (Italy)

14 January 2012
14:00

București Wolves (Romania)	13–34	(France) Stade Français
Try: Mitu 15' m Lucaci 73' m Pen: Vlaicu (1/1) 35'	Report	Try: Camara (2) 28' c, 56' c Turinui 40' c Rokobaro 80' c Con: Plisson (3/3); Rokobaro (1/1); Pen: Plisson (2/2) 21', 43'

Stadionul Arcul de Triumf, Bucharest
Attendance: 1,074
Referee: Marius Mitrea (Italy)

14 January 2012
15:00

Worcester Warriors (England)	55–10	(Italy) Crociati Parma
Try: Claassens (2) 1' c, 38' m Grove 21' c Goode 31' c Arscott 42' c Drauniniu 47' m Hayes 56' m Gulliver 69' c Benjamin 75' m Con: Goode (4/6); Gray (1/3)	Report	Try: penalty try 51' c Con: Zucconi (1/1); Pen: Zucconi (1/1) 59'

Sixways Stadium, Worcester
Attendance: 4,531
Referee: Andrew Macpherson (Scotland)

21 January 2012
15:00

Crociati Parma (Italy)	13–26	(Romania) București Wolves
Try: Casalini 74' m Festuccia 74' m Pen: Gennari (1/1) 49'	Report	Try: Surugiu (2) 4' c, 28' c Apostol 22' c Dobre 63' m Con: Vlaicu (3/4)

Stadio XXV Aprile, Parma
Attendance: 250
Referee: David Wilkinson (Ireland)

21 January 2012
20:45

Stade Français (France)	33–10	(England) Worcester Warriors
Try: Warwick 7' c Parisse 28' c Turinui 37' c Sackey 55' m Kelleher 74' c Con: Plisson (3/4); Warwick (1/1)	Report	Try: Goode 51' c Con: Goode (1/1); Pen: Goode (1/1) 5'

Stade Sébastien Charléty, Paris
Attendance: 6,693
Referee: Leighton Hodges (Wales)

=== Pool 2 ===
Team	P	W	D	L	Tries for	Tries against	Try diff	Points for	Points against	Points diff	TB	LB	Pts
(France) Toulon (3)	6	5	0	1	26	5	+14	197	73	+124	3	1	25
(England) Newcastle Falcons	6	4	0	2	18	9	+9	133	82	+51	2	0	18
(France) Lyon	6	3	0	3	16	11	+5	143	114	+29	1	1	14
(Italy) Petrarca Padova	6	0	0	6	3	38	−28	50	254	−204	0	0	0

10 November 2011
20:30

Toulon (France)	53–22	(Italy) Petrarca Padova
Try: Chilachava 15' c Bonnet 17' c Frou 23' m Loamanu 44' c Lapeyre 46' m penalty try 57' c Chiocci 61' m Fa'osiliva 73' c Con: Dumora (5/8); Pen: Dumora (1/2) 39'	Report	Try: Cavalieri 30' m Palmer 70' m Pen: Hickey (4/5) 5', 12', 27', 34'

Stade Pierre Rajon, Bourgoin-Jallieu
Attendance: 1,095
Referee: Neil Hennessy (Wales)

12 November 2011
15:00

Newcastle Falcons (England)	27–19	(France) Lyon
Try: Swinson 7' m Fitzpatrick 39' m Pasqualin 52' m Pen: Manning (4/4) 3', 12', 73', 78'	Report	Try: Bontinck 55' c Con: Tomamichel (1/1); Pen: Tomamichel (3/3) 5', 14', 18'; Loursac (1/1) 60'

Kingston Park, Newcastle
Attendance: 3,533
Referee: James Jones (Wales)

19 November 2011
15:00

Petrarca Padova (Italy)	3–34	(England) Newcastle Falcons
Pen: Hickey (1/1) 53'	Report	Try: Helleur 19' c Manning 24' c Swinson (2) 45' m, 80' m Shortland 51' m Graham 60' m Con: Manning (2/6)

Stadio Plebiscito, Padua
Attendance: 1,900
Referee: Dudley Phillips (Ireland)

19 November 2011
20:45

Lyon (France)	19–26	(France) Toulon
Try: Bonrepaux 80' c Con: Loursac (1/1); Pen: Loursac (3/3) 10', 36', 53'; Drop: Sadourny (1/1) 21'	Report	Try: Lovobalavu 27' c Loamanu 59' c Con: Dumora (1/1); Wilkinson (1/1); Pen: Dumora (3/3) 5', 18', 39'; Wilkinson (1/1) 56'

Stade Matmut, Lyon
Attendance: 7,615
Referee: Peter Allan (Scotland)

8 December 2011
19:45

Newcastle Falcons (England)	6–3	(France) Toulon
Pen: Gopperth (2/3) 46', 49'	Report	Pen: Dumora (1/1) 50'

Kingston Park, Newcastle
Attendance: 5,579
Referee: Peter Fitzgibbon (Ireland)

10 December 2011
17:00

Lyon (France)	31–16	(Italy) Petrarca Padova
Try: Ratuvou 5' c Raffault 13' m Basson 76' c Con: van Gisbergen (2/3); Pen: van Gisbergen (3/3) 18', 35', 66'; Thomas (1/1) 71'	Report	Try: Kingi 25' c Con: Hickey (1/1); Pen: Hickey (3/3) 33', 49', 64'

Stade Matmut, Lyon
Attendance: 6,169
Referee: Andrew Macpherson (Scotland)

17 December 2011
15:00

Petrarca Padova (Italy)	3–43	(France) Lyon
Pen: Hickey (1/1) 4'	Report	Try: Waisale Sukanaveita (2) 2' c, 17' c Fatafehi (2) 10' c, 23' m Testa 34' c van Gisbergen 50' m Regard 73' m Con: van Gisbergen (4/6)

Stadio Plebiscito, Padua
Attendance: 1,000
Referee: Andrew McMenemy (Scotland)

17 December 2011
20:45

Toulon (France)	36–10	(England) Newcastle Falcons
Try: Messina 18' m Loamanu (2) 35' c, 40' c Lewis-Roberts 44' c Smith 59' c Con: Wilkinson (4/5); Pen: Wilkinson (1/1) 7'	Report	Try: Uys 72' c Con: Manning (1/1); Pen: Manning (1/1) 16'

Stade Mayol, Toulon
Attendance: 13,000
Referee: Peter Allan (Scotland)

15 January 2012
15:30

Newcastle Falcons (England)	43–0	(Italy) Petrarca Padova
Try: Catterick 7' c Fitzpatrick 42' c Hodgson 51' c Shortland (2) 55' m, 79' m Pasqualin 71' m Wells 77' c Con: Hodgson (2/5); Manning (2/2)	Report

Kingston Park, Newcastle
Attendance: 2,831
Referee: Neil Hennessy (Wales)

15 January 2012
18:30

Toulon (France)	29–10	(France) Lyon
Try: Senatore 14' c Lapeyre 52' c Gunther 80' c Rooney 80' m Con: Wilkinson (3/4); Pen: Wilkinson (1/1) 35'	Report	Try: Bontinck 76' c Con: Lespinas (1/1); Pen: de Bruyn (1/2) 5'

Stade Mayol, Toulon
Attendance: 14,121
Referee: James Jones (Wales)

21 January 2012
15:00

Lyon (France)	21–13	(England) Newcastle Falcons
Try: Ratuvou 13' c penalty try 62' c Tranier 68' c Con: Thomas (1/1); Loursac (2/2)	Report	Try: Pennycook 21' c Con: Gopperth (1/1); Pen: Gopperth (2/2) 40', 54'

Stade Matmut, Lyon
Attendance: 7,115
Referee: Carlo Damasco (Italy)

21 January 2012
15:00

Petrarca Padova (Italy)	6–50	(France) Toulon
Pen: Chillon (1/1) 21'; Walsh (1/1) 35'	Report	Try: Lapeyre (2) 8' c, 58' m Emmanuelli 32' c Cibray 39' c Palisson 61' c Lovobalavu 68' c penalty try 80' c Con: Wilkinson (3/4); Dumora (3/3); Pen: Wilkinson (1/1) 1'

Stadio Plebiscito, Padua
Attendance: 2,000
Referee: Andrew Macpherson (Scotland)

=== Pool 3 ===
Team	P	W	D	L	Tries for	Tries against	Try diff	Points for	Points against	Points diff	TB	LB	Pts
(England) London Wasps (4)	6	5	0	1	21	7	+14	189	75	+114	4	0	24
(France) Bayonne	6	5	0	1	24	3	+21	197	61	+136	2	0	22
(France) Bordeaux Bègles	6	2	0	4	9	14	−5	82	132	−50	1	1	10
(Italy) Rovigo	6	0	0	6	5	35	−30	51	251	−200	0	1	1

12 November 2011
15:00

Rovigo (Italy)	10–43	(France) Bayonne
Try: Reato 43' c Con: Bustos (1/1); Pen: Bustos (1/1) 28'	Report	Try: Lacroix (2) 6' c, 55' c Heymans 11' c Marmouyet (2) 51' c, 63' c Rokocoko 57' m Con: Boyet (4/4); Garcia (1/2); Pen: Boyet (1/1) 9'

Stadio Comunale Mario Battaglini, Rovigo
Attendance: 900
Referee: Andrew Macpherson (Scotland)

12 November 2011
20:45

Bordeaux Bègles (France)	14–47	(England) London Wasps
Try: Le Bourhis 9' c Brana 47' c Con: Sánchez (2/2)	Report	Try: Wade (3) 1' m, 10' m, 24' c Waldouck 30' c Varndell 55' c Berry 80' c Con: Robinson (4/6); Pen: Robinson (3/3) 7', 67', 76'

Stade Chaban-Delmas, Bordeaux
Attendance: 16,953
Referee: Leighton Hodges (Wales)

17 November 2011
20:30

Bayonne (France)	20–3	(France) Bordeaux Bègles
Try: penalty try 21' c Haare 56' c Con: Bouillon (2/2); Pen: Bouillon (2/3) 4', 15'	Report	Pen: Lopez (1/3) 46'

Stade Jean Dauger, Bayonne
Attendance: 10,300
Referee: James Jones (Wales)

20 November 2011
15:00

London Wasps (England)	38–7	(Italy) Rovigo
Try: Southwell (3) 15' c, 27' c, 47' c Taulafo 59' c Haughton 72' c Con: Robinson (4/4); Davis (1/1); Pen: Robinson (1/1) 3'	Report	Try: Pavan 6' c Con: Duca (1/1)

Adams Park, High Wycombe
Attendance: 4,225
Referee: Neil Hennessy (Wales)

10 December 2011
15:00

Rovigo (Italy)	7–31	(France) Bordeaux Bègles
Try: Pavan 46' c Con: Bustos (1/1)	Report	Try: Lilo 32' c Saubusse 59' c Tisseau 72' c Lopez 79' c Con: Sánchez (4/4); Drop: Sánchez (1/1) 3'

Stadio Comunale Mario Battaglini, Rovigo
Attendance: 800
Referee: Leighton Hodges (Wales)

10 December 2011
20:45

Bayonne (France)	19–11	(England) London Wasps
Try: Huget 17' c Con: Boyet (1/1); Pen: Boyet (4/5) 4', 37', 47', 54'	Report	Try: Daly 78' m Pen: Robinson (2/3) 9', 16'

Stade Jean Dauger, Bayonne
Attendance: 11,876
Referee: Dudley Phillips (Ireland)

15 December 2011
19:00

Bordeaux Bègles (France)	15–10	(Italy) Rovigo
Try: Béthéry 8' m Sánchez 50' c Con: Sánchez (1/2); Pen: Sánchez (1/1) 45'	Report	Try: Pace 21' c Con: Duca (1/1); Drop: Duca (1/1) 23'

Stade André Moga, Bègles
Attendance: 2,000
Referee: Luke Pearce (England)

15 December 2011
19:45

London Wasps (England)	25–11	(France) Bayonne
Try: Jones 2' c Con: Robinson (1/1); Pen: Robinson (5/5) 17', 23', 58', 61', 70'; Daly (1/1) 47'	Report	Try: Lauaki 37' m Pen: Boyet (2/2) 19', 29'

Adams Park, High Wycombe
Attendance: 4,350
Referee: Neil Paterson (Scotland)

12 January 2012
20:15

Bordeaux Bègles (France)	6–12	(France) Bayonne
Pen: Saubusse (2/2) 38', 53'	Report	Pen: Boyet (4/4) 7', 26', 41', 67'

Stade André Moga, Bègles
Attendance: 2,900
Referee: Carlo Damasco (Italy)

14 January 2012
15:00

Rovigo (Italy)	11–32	(England) London Wasps
Try: Pace 48' m Pen: Duca (2/2) 11', 30'	Report	Try: Jones 13' m Daly 32' c Davis 77' c Haughton 80' c Con: Davis (2/3); Simpson (1/1); Pen: Davis (2/2) 52', 53'

Stadio Comunale Mario Battaglini, Rovigo
Attendance: 1,200
Referee: Laurent Cardona (France)

22 January 2012
15:00

London Wasps (England)	36–13	(France) Bordeaux Bègles
Try: Daly 17' m Everard 39' m penalty try 72' c Lindsay 76' c Con: Davis (2/4); Pen: Davis (4/6) 22', 48', 57', 63'	Report	Try: Lilo 6' c Con: Lopez (1/1); Pen: Lopez (1/1) 41'; Ferreres (1/1) 50'

Adams Park, High Wycombe
Attendance: 4,809
Referee: Neil Hennessy (Wales)

22 January 2012
16:00

Bayonne (France)	92–6	(Italy) Rovigo
Try: penalty try 5' c Roumieu 14' c Bernad 25' m Rokocoko 28' c Lacroix 32' c Carillo (3) 42' c, 53' m, 70' c Haare 58' c Lagain 61' c Otazo 65' c Phillips 72' m O'Connor 75' c Audy 80' c Con: Otazo (11/14)	Report	Pen: Bustos (2/2) 9', 12'

Stade Jean Dauger, Bayonne
Attendance: 5,000
Referee: James Jones (Wales)

=== Pool 4 ===
Team	P	W	D	L	Tries for	Tries against	Try diff	Points for	Points against	Points diff	TB	LB	Pts
(England) Exeter Chiefs (8)	6	5	0	1	22	4	+18	202	64	+138	2	1	23
(France) Perpignan	6	4	0	2	17	9	+8	153	112	+41	2	0	18
(Wales) Newport Gwent Dragons	6	3	0	3	16	7	+9	139	100	+39	2	1	15
(Italy) Cavalieri Prato	6	0	0	6	6	41	−35	62	280	−218	0	0	0

11 November 2011
19:00

Perpignan (France)	15–12	(England) Exeter Chiefs
Pen: Hook (5/6) 18', 30', 40', 44', 49'	Report	Pen: Steenson (4/4) 7', 9', 17', 23'

Stade Aimé Giral, Perpignan
Attendance: 11,336
Referee: Peter Allan (Scotland)

12 November 2011
14:30

Cavalieri Prato (Italy)	3–33	(Wales) Newport Gwent Dragons
Pen: Wakarua (1/1) 9'	Report	Try: Brew 3' c Sidoli 13' c Chavhanga 48' c L. Evans 60' c M. Thomas 66' m Con: Tovey (4/4)

Stadio Lungobisenzio, Prato
Attendance: 2,000
Referee: Mathieu Raynal (France)

17 November 2011
19:45

Newport Gwent Dragons (Wales)	23–13	(France) Perpignan
Try: L. Evans 12' c A. Jones 24' c Con: Tovey (2/2); Pen: Tovey (1/3) 21'; Drop: Tovey (2/2) 56', 61'	Report	Try: Planté 80' c Con: Hook (1/1); Pen: Hook (2/3) 34', 46'

Rodney Parade, Newport
Attendance: 5,160
Referee: Neil Paterson (Scotland)

19 November 2011
15:00

Exeter Chiefs (England)	68–0	(Italy) Cavalieri Prato
Try: White 2' c Tatupa (2) 11' c, 42' m penalty try (2) 35' c, 72' c Phillips (2) 38' c, 74' c Foster 48' m Bentley 58' m Nowell 77' m Con: Mieres (4/7); Steenson (2/3); Pen: Mieres (2/2) 6', 9'	Report

Sandy Park, Exeter
Attendance: 5,937
Referee: Laurent Cardona (France)

9 December 2011
19:00

Perpignan (France)	54–20	(Italy) Cavalieri Prato
Try: R. Taofifenua (2) 4' c, 42' c Candelon 12' c penalty try (2) 26' c, 38' c Laharrague 64' c Planté 72' c Vivalda 77' m Con: Bosch (7/8)	Report	Try: von Grumbkow 20' c Berryman 50' c Con: Wakarua (2/2); Pen: Wakarua (2/2) 8', 16'

Stade Aimé Giral, Perpignan
Attendance: 6,300
Referee: Luke Pearce (England)

11 December 2011
17:45

Exeter Chiefs (England)	18–6	(Wales) Newport Gwent Dragons
Pen: Mieres (6/7) 3', 11', 23', 28', 68', 80'	Report	Pen: Steffan Jones (2/3) 51', 58'

Sandy Park, Exeter
Attendance: 5,944
Referee: Carlo Damasco (Italy)

17 December 2011
14:30

Cavalieri Prato (Italy)	13–30	(France) Perpignan
Try: Tempestini 77' c Con: Chiesa (1/1); Pen: Wakarua (2/2) 9', 12'	Report	Try: penalty try (2) 27' c, 53' c Cazenave 67' m Tuilagi 73' m Con: Porical (2/4); Pen: Porical (2/2) 21', 24'

Stadio Lungobisenzio, Prato
Attendance: 1,500
Referee: James Jones (Wales)

18 December 2011
17:45

Newport Gwent Dragons (Wales)	19–23	(England) Exeter Chiefs
Try: Faletau 38' c Con: Tovey (1/1); Pen: Tovey (4/5) 6', 16', 24', 54'	Report	Try: Alcott 50' c Phillips 76' c Con: Steenson (2/2); Pen: Mieres (2/3) 10', 19'; Steenson (1/2) 58'

Rodney Parade, Newport
Attendance: 5,137
Referee: Mathieu Raynal (France)

14 January 2012
14:30

Cavalieri Prato (Italy)	10–50	(England) Exeter Chiefs
Try: Belardo 56' c Con: Bocchino (1/1); Pen: Wakarua (1/1) 40'	Report	Try: penalty try (2) 15' c, 66' c Barrett 28' c Foster 45' c Muldowney 69' c Phibbs 76' c Mieres 80' m Con: Steenson (4/4); Dorrian (1/1); Mieres (1/2); Pen: Steenson (1/1) 12'

Stadio Lungobisenzio, Prato
Attendance: 1,050
Referee: Cédric Marchat (France)

14 January 2012
20:55

Perpignan (France)	27–13	(Wales) Newport Gwent Dragons
Try: Geli 55' c Tchale-Watchou 78' m Con: Porical (1/1); Pen: Porical (5/6) 1', 7', 12', 22', 33'	Report	Try: Brew 42' c Con: M. Jones (1/1); Pen: M. Jones (2/4) 16', 58'

Stade Aimé Giral, Perpignan
Attendance: 10,414
Referee: Peter Allan (Scotland)

21 January 2012
15:00

Exeter Chiefs (England)	31–14	(France) Perpignan
Try: Thomas 26' c Sturgess 60' m Phillips 68' c Con: Mieres (1/2); Steenson (1/1); Pen: Mieres (4/4) 13', 23', 39', 57'	Report	Try: Geli 2' c Michel 7' c Con: Hook (2/2)

Sandy Park, Exeter
Attendance: 7,966
Referee: Dudley Phillips (Ireland)

21 January 2012
15:00

Newport Gwent Dragons (Wales)	45–16	(Italy) Cavalieri Prato
Try: Buckley 4' c Hughes 11' m Brew 22' c Tuilagi 28' c Tovey 38' c M. Thomas 65' m Robling 72' c Con: Tovey (5/7)	Report	Try: Lunardi 44' m von Grumbkow 78' m Pen: Bocchino (2/2) 8', 25'

Rodney Parade, Newport
Attendance: 4,736
Referee: Andrew McMenemy (Scotland)

=== Pool 5 ===
Team	P	W	D	L	Tries for	Tries against	Try diff	Points for	Points against	Points diff	TB	LB	Pts
(France) Brive (2)	6	6	0	0	26	7	+19	209	79	+130	3	0	28
(England) Sale Sharks	6	4	0	2	31	8	+23	225	96	+129	4	0	20
(France) Agen	6	2	0	4	24	21	+3	168	166	+2	2	0	10
(Spain) La Vila	6	0	0	6	6	51	−45	64	325	−261	0	0	0

12 November 2011
16:00

La Vila (Spain)	10–50	(France) Agen
Try: Knight 77' c Con: McCashin (1/1); Pen: McCashin (1/1) 14'	Report	Try: Tian (3) 3' m, 51' c, 55' c Tagotago 4' m Faʻaoso 25' c Senekal 27' c Narjissi 61' m Swiryn 63' c Con: Courrent (5/8)

Villajoyosa Stadium, Villajoyosa
Attendance: 2,500
Referee: Stefano Penne (Italy)

12 November 2011
18:30

Brive (France)	26–18	(England) Sale Sharks
Try: Spedding 5' c Atayi 47' c Con: Swanepoel (2/2); Pen: Swanepoel (4/4) 12', 17', 36', 39'	Report	Try: Brady 60' m Leota 74' c Con: Macleod (1/2); Pen: Macleod (2/2) 9', 29'

Stade Amédée Domenech, Brive-la-Gaillarde
Attendance: 5,500
Referee: Carlo Damasco (Italy)

18 November 2011
19:45

Sale Sharks (England)	59–6	(Spain) La Vila
Try: penalty try 16' c Powell 23' m Higgins 28' c Leota (3) 49' c, 78' c, 80' m Burrell 54' c Willis 60' c Vernon 72' c Con: Miller (7/9)	Report	Pen: McCashin (2/3) 34', 36'

Edgeley Park, Stockport
Attendance: 4,910
Referee: Alan Falzone (Italy)

20 November 2011
18:00

Agen (France)	8–29	(France) Brive
Try: Balès 55' m Pen: Courrent (1/2) 19'	Report	Try: Atayi 10' m Acosta 23' m penalty try 75' c Con: J. Caminati (1/1); Pen: Bélie (4/4) 2', 28', 43', 54'

Stade Armandie, Agen
Attendance: 5,177
Referee: Leighton Hodges (Wales)

8 December 2011
20:30

Agen (France)	14–29	(England) Sale Sharks
Try: Lagrange 30' c O'Connor 52' c Con: Courrent (2/2)	Report	Try: Gaskell 13' m Jones 16' c Vernon 22' c Burrell 37' c Con: Macleod (3/4); Pen: Macleod (1/3) 8'

Stade Armandie, Agen
Attendance: 3,117
Referee: Peter Allan (Scotland)

10 December 2011
16:00

La Vila (Spain)	18–47	(France) Brive
Try: Poggi 18' c Carmona 79' m Con: McCashin (1/2); Pen: McCashin (2/2) 6', 13'	Report	Try: Boussuge (3) 4' c, 29' c, 61' c Namy 15' c Acosta 32' c Galala (2) 44' c, 55' m Con: B. Caminati (5/6); Swanepoel (1/1)

Villajoyosa Stadium, Villajoyosa
Attendance: 1,000
Referee: David Wilkinson (Ireland)

15 December 2011
20:00

Brive (France)	38–13	(Spain) La Vila
Try: B. Caminati 5' c Spedding 7' c Acosta 15' c Atayi 22' m Bias 36' c Bélie 69' m Con: B. Caminati (4/6)	Report	Try: Reid 47' c Con: McCashin (1/1); Pen: McCashin (2/2) 34', 58'

Stade Amédée Domenech, Brive-la-Gaillarde
Attendance: 3,500
Referee: Marius Mitrea (Italy)

18 December 2011
15:00

Sale Sharks (England)	41–21	(France) Agen
Try: Brady (2) 19' c, 41' c Seymour 25' c Willis 55' c Mathie 79' c Con: Macleod (4/4); Miller (1/1); Pen: Macleod (2/2) 3', 6'	Report	Try: Robinson 66' c Fonua 70' m Con: Lamoulie (1/2); Pen: Courrent (3/3) 1', 10', 39'

Edgeley Park, Stockport
Attendance: 4,915
Referee: Dudley Phillips (Ireland)

13 January 2012
20:00

Brive (France)	50–13	(France) Agen
Try: Barozzi 31' m Lacombe 35' m Marienval 58' m J. Caminati 62' m B. Caminati 68' c penalty try 75' c Namy 79' c Con: B. Caminati (3/3); Pen: J. Caminati (3/3) 3', 13', 39'	Report	Try: Agulla 41' c Con: Lamoulie (1/1); Pen: Lamoulie (2/2) 16', 26'

Stade Amédée Domenech, Brive-la-Gaillarde
Attendance: 3,500
Referee: Luke Pearce (England)

14 January 2012
16:00

La Vila (Spain)	10–69	(England) Sale Sharks
Try: Evans 36' c Con: McCashin (1/1); Pen: McCashin (1/1) 16'	Report	Try: Brady (2) 10' c, 52' c Tuculet 14' m Ward 18' m Miller (2) 39' c, 48' c Vernon (2) 40' c, 68' m Cliff 45' c Mathie 60' c Davies 74' m Con: Miller (7/9)

Villajoyosa Stadium, Villajoyosa
Attendance: 2,000
Referee: Andrew McMenemy (Scotland)

19 January 2012
19:45

Sale Sharks (England)	9–19	(France) Brive
Pen: Macleod (3/3) 3', 20', 37'	Report	Try: Claassen 74' c Con: J. Caminati (1/1); Pen: J. Caminati (4/6) 16', 39', 49', 78'

Edgeley Park, Stockport
Attendance: 6,955
Referee: Peter Allan (Scotland)

19 January 2012
20:45

Agen (France)	62–7	(Spain) La Vila
Try: Telefoni (2) 3' c, 21' c Vaka (3) 18' c, 36' c, 42' m Giraud 33' c Dulin 53' c Narjissi 62' m Dupuy 64' m Avramovic 73' m Con: Machenaud (5/6); Lamoulie (1/4)	Report	Try: Els 16' c Con: McCashin (1/1)

Stade Armandie, Agen
Attendance: 2,169
Referee: Marius Mitrea (Italy)

== See also ==
- European Challenge Cup
- 2011–12 Heineken Cup
