= 2015–16 European Rugby Challenge Cup pool stage =

- Season: 2015–16 European Rugby Challenge Cup
- Date: 12 November 2015 – 24 January 2016

Qualifiers
- Seed 1: (England) Harlequins
- Seed 2: (England) Gloucester
- Seed 3: (England) Sale Sharks
- Seed 4: (France) Grenoble
- Seed 5: (Ireland) Connacht
- Seed 6: (France) Montpellier
- Seed 7: (Wales) Newport Gwent Dragons
- Seed 8: (England) London Irish

The 2015–16 European Rugby Challenge Cup pool stage was the first stage of competition in the second season of the European Rugby Challenge Cup.

It involved 20 teams competing, across 5 pools of 4 teams, for 8 quarter-final places – awarded to the 5 pool winners and the 3 top-ranked pool runners-up.

The pool stage began on 12 November 2015 but one game was postponed following the November 2015 Paris attacks. It is due to be completed on the weekend of 21–24 January 2016.

== Seeding ==
The majority of teams were seeded based on their performance in the Premiership, the Pro12 and the Top 14. However, as the Premiership and Top 14 incorporate promotion and relegation into their competitions, three teams are seeded based on their performance in the Greene King IPA Championship and Pro D2 Leagues, having been promoted this season. Two final teams come from the Qualifying Competition involving emerging rugby nations, and some Italian Excellenza clubs.

Rank	Top 14	Premiership	Pro 12	Qualifying Competition
1	(France) Montpellier	(England) Sale Sharks	(Ireland) Connacht	(Italy) Calvisano
2	(France) La Rochelle	(England) Harlequins	(Scotland) Edinburgh	(Russia) Enisey-STM
3	(France) Brive	(England) Gloucester	(Wales) Newport Gwent Dragons	
4	(France) Grenoble	(England) London Irish	(Wales) Cardiff Blues	
5	(France) Castres Olympique	(England) Newcastle Falcons	(Italy) Zebre	
6	(France) Pau	(England) Worcester Warriors		
7	(France) Agen			

Teams were then placed into 4 Tiers, each containing 5 teams, based on their seeding. A draw determined which two second seeded teams completed Tier 1, and based on this, the fourth seeded teams were allocated to either Tier 2 and Tier 3.

Given the nature of the Qualifying Competition, a competition including developing rugby nations and Italian clubs not competing in the Pro12, Rugby Europe 1 and Rugby Europe 2 are automatically included in Tier 4, despite officially being ranked 1/2 from that competition.

The brackets show each teams seeding and their league (for example, 1 Top 14 indicates the team has been seeded 1st from the Top 14).

Tier 1	(Ireland) Connacht (1 Pro12)	(England) Sale Sharks (1 AP)	(France) Montpellier (1 Top 14)	(France) La Rochelle (2 Top 14)	(Scotland) Edinburgh (2 Pro12)
Tier 2	(England) Harlequins (2 AP)	(Wales) Newport Gwent Dragons (3 Pro12)	(England) Gloucester (3 AP)	(France) Brive (3 Top 14)	(England) London Irish (4 AP)
Tier 3	(France) Grenoble (4 Top 14)	(Wales) Cardiff Blues (4 Pro12)	(Italy) Zebre (5 Pro12)	(England) Newcastle Falcons (5 AP)	(France) Castres Olympique (5 Top 14)
Tier 4	(England) Worcester Warriors (6 AP)	(France) Pau (Top 14)	(France) Agen (Top 14)	(Italy) Calvisano (QC 1)	(Russia) Enisey-STM (QC 2)

== Pool stage ==
The draw took place on 17 June 2015, at the Château de Neuchâtel, in Neuchâtel, Switzerland.

During the pool stage, the teams will play the 3 other teams in their pool twice, both at home and away, Based on the result of the match, teams receive:

- 4 points for a win,
- 2 points for a draw,
- 1 attacking bonus point for scoring four or more tries in a match,
- 1 defensive bonus point for losing a match by seven points or less.

Following the pool stage, the five winners from each group progress to the quarter-finals, along with the three best pool runners-up from the competition. In the event of a tie between two or more teams from the same pool, the following criteria were used as tie-breakers:

1. The club with the greater number of competition points from only matches involving tied teams.
2. If equal, the club with the best aggregate points difference from those matches.
3. If equal, the club that scored the most tries in those matches.

If this did not separate teams, and/or the tie related to teams that did not play each other (i.e., in different pools), the following tie breakers were used:

1. If equal, the club with the best aggregate points difference from the pool stage.
2. The club that scored the most tries in the pool stage.
3. If equal, the club with the fewest players suspended in the pool stage.
4. If equal, the drawing of lots will determine a club's ranking.

Fixtures for the competition were announced on 14 August 2015, with the exception of Pool 1, due to a delay in agreeing a suitable 'home' stadium for Enisey-STM, who normally play in Krasnoyarsk, Siberia, where temperatures during tournament time can reach −20 °C. It was later agreed by the four teams in the pool that Enisey-STM would host only its Round 1 game in Krasnoyarsk, with the club's remaining two "home" matches to be held in the considerably warmer city of Sochi. A draw was held on 4 September 2015 at the EPCR headquarters in Neuchâtel to determine which club would travel to Krasnoyarsk, and Connacht was drawn as the Round 1 opponent.

Key to colours
Winner of each pool, advance to quarter-finals.
Three highest-scoring second-place teams advance to quarter-finals.
Cannot advance to the quarter-finals.

=== Pool 1 ===
Pos	Team	Pld	W	D	L	PF	PA	PD	TF	TA	TB	LB	Pts
1	(Ireland) Connacht (5)	6	4	0	2	147	96	+51	20	12	2	1	19
2	(England) Newcastle Falcons	6	3	0	3	137	97	+40	20	9	3	1	16
3	(France) Brive	6	3	0	3	114	88	+26	12	11	1	3	16
4	(Russia) Enisey-STM	6	2	0	4	63	180	−117	8	28	0	0	8

Source: espn.co.uk

13 November 2015
19:30

Brive (France)	13–9	(England) Newcastle Falcons (1 BP)
Try: Radikedike 14' c Con: Bezy (1/1) 15'; Pen: Bezy (2/4) 28', 34'	Report	Pen: Catterick (3/4) 31', 44', 60'

Stade Amédée-Domenech
Attendance: 6,000
Referee: Leighton Hodges (WRU)

14 November 2015
15:00

Enisey-STM (Russia)	14–31	(Ireland) Connacht (1 BP)
Try: Polivalov (2) 72' c, 80' c Con: Kushnarev (2/2) 73', 80'	Report	Try: Adeolokun 49' m Muldoon 51' m Leader 62' m Parata 76' c Con: Leader (1/1) 76'; Pen: MacGinty (3/4) 7', 36', 43'

Central Stadium, Krasnoyarsk
Attendance: 2,500
Referee: Thomas Charabas (FFR)

21 November 2015
17:00

Connacht (Ireland)	21–17	(France) Brive (1 BP)
Try: Parata 35' m Marshall 45' m Marmion 50' m Pen: Carty (2/2) 33', 40'	Report	Try: Acquier 28' m Masilevu 47' m Galala 73' c Con: Iribaren (1/1) 74'; Pen: Sola (0/2)

Galway Sportsgrounds
Attendance: 4,357
Referee: Craig Maxwell-Keys (RFU)

22 November 2015
15:00

(1 BP) Newcastle Falcons (England)	55–7	(Russia) Enisey-STM
Try: Kibirige (2) 6' m, 59' m M. Wilson (3) 15' c, 25' m, 30' c Watson (4) 17' m, 46' c, 74' c, 78' c Con: Catterick (5/9) 16', 31', 47', 75', 78'	Report	Try: Simplikevich 27' c Con: Kushnarev (1/1) 28'

Kingston Park
Attendance: 4,093
Referee: Andrew Brace (IRFU)

11 December 2015
19:45

Connacht (Ireland)	25–10	(England) Newcastle Falcons
Try: Poolman 74' c Con: Carty (1/1) 76'; Pen: Carty (6/7) 6', 16', 38', 47', 52', 69'	Report	Try: Mayhew 56' c Con: Willis (1/1) 57'; Pen: Willis (1/2) 33'

Galway Sportsgrounds
Attendance: 4,346
Referee: Thomas Charabas (FFR)

12 December 2015
16:00

Enisey-STM (Russia)	10–7	(France) Brive (1 BP)
Try: Gasanov 29' c Con: Kushnarev (1/1) 30'; Pen: Kushnarev (1/1) 40'	Report	Try: Acquier 45' c Con: Bezy (1/1) 46'

Sochi Central Stadium, Sochi
Attendance: 600
Referee: Vlad Iordachescu (FRR)

19 December 2015
15:00

(1 BP) Brive (France)	33–3	(Russia) Enisey-STM
Try: Septar 2' c Mignardi 38' c Koyamaibole 43' c Mafi 46' c Sola 79' m Con: Laranjeira (4/4) 3', 39', 44', 47'	Report	Pen: Kushnarev (1/2) 6'

Stade Amédée-Domenech
Attendance: 3,000
Referee: Gary Conway (IRFU)

20 December 2015
15:00

(1 BP) Newcastle Falcons (England)	29–5	(Ireland) Connacht
Try: Watson (2) 24' m, 57' m Penalty try (2) 41' c, 56' c Agulla 46' m Con: Willis (2/5) 42', 56'	Report	Try: Poolman 33' m

Kingston Park
Attendance: 4,067
Referee: Ben Whitehouse (WRU)

16 January 2016
14:00

Enisey-STM (Russia)	24–7	(England) Newcastle Falcons
Try: Simplikevich 5' c Kacharava (2) 28' c, 42' c Con: Kushnarev (3/3) 6', 29', 43'; Pen: Kushnarev (1/1) 52'	Report	Try: Green 19' c Con: Penny (1/1) 20'

Sochi Central Stadium, Sochi
Attendance: 400
Referee: Tual Trainini (FFR)

16 January 2016
20:45

Brive (France)	21–18	(Ireland) Connacht (1 BP)
Pen: Laranjeira (7/8) 6', 17', 26', 47', 58', 62', 80'	Report	Try: Parata 1' m Muldoon (2) 53' m, 78' m Pen: MacGinty (1/2) 42'

Stade Amédée-Domenech
Attendance: 3,000
Referee: Craig Maxwell-Keys (RFU)

23 January 2016
15:00

(1 BP) Connacht (Ireland)	47–5	(Russia) Enisey-STM
Try: O'Halloran 16' m Healy (2) 20' c, 60' m Buckley 27' m Poolman 38' m Henshaw 41' m McCartney 52' m Blade 79' c Con: MacGinty (1/5) 21'; Carty (1/3) 79'; Pen: MacGinty (1/1) 11'	Report	Try: Orlov 46' m

Galway Sportsgrounds
Attendance: 4,261
Referee: Tom Foley (RFU)

23 January 2016
15:00

(1 BP) Newcastle Falcons (England)	27–23	(France) Brive (1 BP)
Try: Hammersley (2) 3' m, 74' m Tait 31' c M. Young 35' c Con: Willis (2/3) 32', 36'; Socino (0/1); Pen: Willis (1/1) 21'	Report	Try: Bezy 41' c Tuatara 68' c Con: Laranjeira (2/2) 41', 69'; Pen: Laranjeira (3/3) 29', 49', 59'

Kingston Park
Attendance: 3,803
Referee: Leighton Hodges (WRU)

=== Pool 2 ===
Pos	Team	Pld	W	D	L	PF	PA	PD	TF	TA	TB	LB	Pts
1	(England) Sale Sharks (3)	6	5	0	1	154	78	+76	20	9	3	0	23
2	(Wales) Newport Gwent Dragons (7)	6	4	0	2	151	117	+34	17	16	3	1	20
3	(France) Castres Olympique	6	3	0	3	124	136	−12	14	15	2	1	15
4	(France) Pau	6	0	0	6	68	166	−98	9	20	0	0	0

Source: espn.co.uk

14 November 2015
19:45

Pau (France)	P–P (Note: Due to the terrorist attacks that took place in Paris on 13 November 2015, all matches that were due to take place in France on 14 and 15 November were postponed.)	(France) Castres Olympique

Stade du Hameau
Referee: Greg Garner (RFU)

15 November 2015
20:45

(1 BP) Newport Gwent Dragons (Wales)	30–12	(England) Sale Sharks
Try: Griffiths 4' m Landman 27' c Hughes 34' m Screech 75' c Con: D. Jones (2/4) 27', 75'; Pen: D. Jones (2/2) 50', 63'	Report	Try: Mitchell 47' c Mills 53' m Con: Macleod (1/2) 47'

Rodney Parade
Attendance: 4,455
Referee: Alexandre Ruiz (FFR)

21 November 2015
14:30

(1 BP) Sale Sharks (England)	29–20	(France) Pau
Try: Mujati 3' c Jennings 27' c James 50' c Fihaki 77' m Con: Ford (3/4) 5', 29', 51'; Pen: Ford (1/1) 41'	Report	Try: Lespiaucq Brettes (2) 21' c, 44' c Con: Daubagna (2/2) 22', 45'; Pen: Daubagna (2/2) 11', 40'

AJ Bell Stadium
Attendance: 4,006
Referee: Ben Whitehouse (WRU)

21 November 2015
17:00

(1 BP) Castres Olympique (France)	32–29	(Wales) Newport Gwent Dragons (1 BP)
Try: Kirkpatrick 14' c Palis 25' c Combezou 61' c Tulou 68' m Con: Palis (3/4) 15', 26', 62'; Pen: Palis (2/3) 50', 65'	Report	Try: Meyer 48' c Dee 56' c Con: D. Jones (2/2) 48', 56'; Pen: D. Jones (4/5) 18', 31', 36', 53'; Meyer (1/1) 71'

Stade Pierre-Antoine
Attendance: 7,580
Referee: Gary Conway (IRFU)

12 December 2015
14:30

Newport Gwent Dragons (Wales)	22–0	(France) Pau
Try: Pretorius 26' m D. Jones 56' m Pen: D. Jones (4/4) 12', 24', 41', 43'	Report

Rodney Parade
Attendance: 4,202
Referee: Craig Maxwell-Keys (RFU)

12 December 2015
20:45

(1 BP) Castres Olympique (France)	10–17	(England) Sale Sharks
Try: Vialelle 8' c Con: Dumora (1/1) 8'; Pen: Dumora (1/1) 33'	Report	Try: Edwards 1' c Penalty try 73' c Con: Ford (2/2) 1', 73'; Pen: Ford (1/3) 59'

Stade Pierre-Antoine
Attendance: 6,816
Referee: David Wilkinson (IRFU)

19 December 2015
14:30

Sale Sharks (England)	31–10	(France) Castres Olympique
Try: Fihaki 44' c Briggs 71' m Leota 79' c Con: Ford (1/1) 45'; Cipriani (1/2) 79'; Pen: Ford (3/3) 3', 10', 29'; Cipriani (1/2) 77'	Report	Try: Beattie 58' c Con: Palis (1/1) 59'; Pen: Dumora (1/1) 43'

AJ Bell Stadium
Attendance: 4,525
Referee: Dudley Phillips (IRFU)

19 December 2015
20:45

Pau (France)	17–34	(Wales) Newport Gwent Dragons (1 BP)
Try: Butler 54' m Ratuvou 69' c Votu 79' m Con: Slade (1/3) 70'	Report	Try: Hill 5' c Hewitt 29' c Tovey 36' c Meyer 48' c Con: Tovey (4/4) 6', 30', 37', 49'; Pen: Meyer (0/1); Tovey (1/1) 17'; Drop: Tovey (1/1) 65'

Stade du Hameau
Attendance: 7,500
Referee: Andrew Brace (IRFU)

9 January 2016
21:00

Pau (France)	21–30	(France) Castres Olympique (1 BP)
Try: Bianchin 38' c Fumat 48' c Dougall 80' c Con: Fajardo (3/3) 40', 49', 80'	Report	Try: Smith 11' c Sivivatu 54' c Vialelle 56' m Beziat 75' m Con: Palis (2/4) 12', 55'; Pen: Palis (2/4) 6', 25'

Stade du Hameau
Attendance: 8,000
Referee: Ian Davies (WRU)

15 January 2016
19:45

(1 BP) Newport Gwent Dragons (Wales)	31–18	(France) Castres Olympique
Try: Amos 1' c Cudd 27' c Evans 36' c Hewitt 72' c Con: Tovey (4/4) 1', 28', 37', 73'; Pen: Tovey (1/1) 10'	Report	Try: Smith 40' c Samson 48' m Con: Palis (1/2) 40'; Pen: Palis (2/2) 12', 56'

Rodney Parade
Attendance: 4,316
Referee: Peter Fitzgibbon (IRFU)

15 January 2016
19:45

Pau (France)	3–27	(England) Sale Sharks (1 BP)
Pen: Marques (1/1) 15'	Report	Try: Ostrikov 1' c Edwards 27' m Addison 36' c Leota 79'm Con: Cipriani (2/3) 2', 37'; Pen: Cipriani (1/1) 40'

Stade du Hameau
Attendance: 6,000
Referee: Gary Conway (IRFU)

21 January 2016
19:45

(1 BP) Sale Sharks (England)	38–5	(Wales) Newport Gwent Dragons
Try: Mujati 13' c Penalty try 20' c Beaumont 40'; Edwards 47' c Haley 76' c Con: Cipriani (4/4) 15', 21', 40', 48'; Ford (1/1) 78'; Pen: Cipriani (1/1) 11'	Report	Try: Hewitt 59' m

AJ Bell Stadium
Attendance: 4,015
Referee: Andrew Brace (IRFU)

22 January 2016
19:00

Castres Olympique (France)	24–7	(France) Pau
Try: Lamerat 17' c Beziat 75' m Con: Urdapilleta (1/1) 18'; Pen: Urdapilleta (2/2) 8', 36'; Caminati (1/1) 51'; Fontaine (1/1) 65'	Report	Try: Lespiaucq Brettes 13' c Con: Slade (1/1) 14'

Stade Pierre-Antoine
Attendance: 6,025
Referee: Ian Tempest (RFU)

=== Pool 3 ===
Pos	Team	Pld	W	D	L	PF	PA	PD	TF	TA	TB	LB	Pts
1	(England) Harlequins (1)	6	5	0	1	225	123	+102	31	13	5	0	25
2	(France) Montpellier (6)	6	4	0	2	221	116	+105	28	13	4	0	20
3	(Wales) Cardiff Blues	6	3	0	3	229	131	+98	31	14	4	1	17
4	(Italy) Calvisano	6	0	0	6	39	344	−305	3	53	0	0	0

Source: espn.co.uk

12 November 2015
19:45

(1 BP) Harlequins (England)	41–18	(France) Montpellier
Try: Wallace 28' m Easter 37' c Clifford 45' c Care 55' m Lindsay-Hague 63' c Robshaw 76' c Con: N. Evans (3/5) 38', 46', 64'; Botica (1/1) 77'; Pen: N. Evans (1/1) 22'	Report	Pen: Paillaugue (6/7) 8', 13', 20', 25', 49', 60'

Twickenham Stoop
Attendance: 7,136
Referee: Ian Davies (WRU)

14 November 2015
15:00

Calvisano (Italy)	9–50	(Wales) Cardiff Blues (1 BP)
Pen: Buscema (3/4) 6', 39', 53'	Report	Try: L. Williams 16' m James 24' c E. Jenkins 44' c Fish 48' c Scully 57' c G. Evans 72' c Penalty try 79' c Con: Patchell (4/5) 25', 45', 49', 58'; J. Evans (2/2) 73', 79'; Pen: Patchell (1/1) 40'

Peroni Stadium
Attendance: 1,500
Referee: Craig Maxwell-Keys (RFU)

19 November 2015
19:45

Cardiff Blues (Wales)	20–32	(England) Harlequins (1 BP)
Try: Penalty try 69' c Hobbs 79' c Con: J. Evans (2/2) 69', 79'; Pen: Patchell (2/2) 7', 12'	Report	Try: Visser 49' c Lindsay-Hague 51' c Walker 64' m Care 80' c Con: Botica (2/3) 49', 51'; Swiel (1/1) 80'; Pen: Botica (2/3) 33', 46'

Cardiff Arms Park
Attendance: 5,249
Referee: Alexandre Ruiz (FFR)

20 November 2015
20:30

(1 BP) Montpellier (France)	64–0	(Italy) Calvisano
Try: O'Connor 7' m Paillaugue 15' c Willemse 22' c Galletier 25' c Penalty try 40' c Mowen 43' c Tuitavake 47' m Malzieu 60' c Ebersohn 77' c Reilhac 80' m Con: Paillaugue (4/5) 16', 23', 27', 40'; Catrakilis (3/5) 44', 61', 78'	Report

Altrad Stadium
Attendance: 9,900
Referee: Tom Foley (RFU)

11 December 2015
19:30

(1 BP) Cardiff Blues (Wales)	37–27	(France) Montpellier (1 BP)
Try: Patchell 1' c Navidi (2) 40' c, 69' c L. Williams 43' m Cuthbert 61' m Con: Patchell (3/5) 1', 40', 71'; Pen: Patchell (2/3) 66', 80'	Report	Try: Mackintosh 5' c Nagusa 13' m Malzieu 19' m Geli 76' c Con: Paillaugue (1/3) 6'; Catrakilis (1/1) 77'; Pen: Paillaugue (1/1) 12'

Cardiff Arms Park
Attendance: 4,602
Referee: Peter Fitzgibbon (IRFU)

12 December 2015
14:30

Calvisano (Italy)	10–50	(England) Harlequins (1 BP)
Try: Mbanda 59' c Con: Minozzi (1/1) 60'; Pen: Buscema (1/1) 15'	Report	Try: Wallace (2) 1' m, 25' m Lambert 6' c Clifford 12' c Chisholm 32' m Hopper 55' c Sinckler 65' c Walker 70' c Con: Botica (5/8) 7', 13', 56', 65', 71'

Peroni Stadium
Attendance: 1,300
Referee: Ben Whitehouse (WRU)

17 December 2015
20:45

Montpellier (France)	23–22	(Wales) Cardiff Blues (1 BP)
Try: Malzieu 39' c Willemse 80' c Con: Catrakilis (2/2) 40', 80'; Pen: Catrakilis (3/4) 10', 23', 61'	Report	Try: Cuthbert 27' c Con: Patchell (1/1) 28'; Pen: Patchell (3/3) 1', 15', 19'; J. Evans (2/2) 68', 72'

Altrad Stadium
Attendance: 6,000
Referee: Ian Tempest (RFU)

19 December 2015
15:00

(1 BP) Harlequins (England)	59–7	(Italy) Calvisano
Try: Yarde 15' c Sinckler 40' c Clifford 44' c Chisholm 46' m Roberts 53' c Walker 61' c Botica 65' c Swiel 67' m Dickson 71' c Con: Botica (7/9) 16', 40', 45', 54', 63', 66', 73'	Report	Try: Susio 29' c Con: Vlaicu (1/1) 31'

Twickenham Stoop
Attendance: 11,230
Referee: Tual Trainini (FFR)

16 January 2016
14:30

Calvisano (Italy)	7–47	(France) Montpellier (1 BP)
Try: Susio 78' c Con: Buscema (1/1) 80'	Report	Try: O'Connor (2) 7' c, 17' c Qera 14' c Fall (2) 21' c, 55' c J. du Plessis 33' c Ebersohn 66' m Con: Catrakilis (6/7) 8', 15', 17', 22', 34', 56'

Peroni Stadium
Attendance: 1,100
Referee: Dudley Phillips (IRFU)

17 January 2016
15:15

(1 BP) Harlequins (England)	34–26	(Wales) Cardiff Blues (1 BP)
Try: Buchanan 4' c Clifford 11' c Yarde 22' c Chisholm 39' c Con: N. Evans (4/4) 5', 12', 23', 40'; Pen: N. Evans (1/1) 55'; Botica (1/1) 80'	Report	Try: Allen 42' c Fish (2) 49' m, 71' c L. Williams 67' c Con: Patchell (3/4) 43', 67', 72'

Twickenham Stoop
Attendance: 12,912
Referee: Andrew Brace (IRFU)

22 January 2016
19:45

(1 BP) Cardiff Blues (Wales)	74–6	(Italy) Calvisano
Try: James (3) 5' c, 15' c, 51' m Allen (2) 8' c, 54' c Navidi 24' c Fish 29' m E. Lewis 48' m Cuthbert 63' c Summerhill 73' m Patchell 75' c Cook 80' m Con: Anscombe (7/12) 9', 9', 16', 25', 56', 64', 76'	Report	Pen: Vlaicu (2/2) 12', 60'

Cardiff Arms Park
Attendance: 5,490
Referee: Thomas Charabas (FFR)

22 January 2016
20:45

(1 BP) Montpellier (France)	42–9	(England) Harlequins
Try: Mogg 14' m Liebenberg 38' c White 68' c Reilhac 77' c Geli 80' c Con: Catrakilis (2/3) 40', 69'; Trinh-Duc (2/2) 78', 80'; Pen: Catrakilis (3/3) 21', 54', 72'	Report	Pen: Botica (3/4) 4', 24', 33'

Altrad Stadium
Attendance: 7,500
Referee: Ben Whitehouse (WRU)

=== Pool 4 ===
Pos	Team	Pld	W	D	L	PF	PA	PD	TF	TA	TB	LB	Pts
1	(England) Gloucester (2)	6	6	0	0	151	86	+65	16	10	1	0	25
2	(Italy) Zebre	6	3	0	3	114	92	+22	11	12	0	1	13
3	(France) La Rochelle	6	2	0	4	100	127	−27	12	13	2	0	10
4	(England) Worcester Warriors	6	1	0	5	88	148	−60	9	14	0	1	5

Source: espn.co.uk

14 November 2015
15:00

Worcester Warriors (England)	19–3	(France) La Rochelle
Try: Howard 77' c Con: Lamb (1/1) 79'; Pen: Lamb (4/4) 4', 9', 14', 40'	Report	Pen: Bouldoire (1/3) 11'

Sixways Stadium
Attendance: 5,124
Referee: Dudley Phillips (IRFU)

14 November 2015
15:15

Gloucester (England)	23–10	(Italy) Zebre
Try: Purdy 7' m Moriarty 12' c McColl 37' m Con: Burns (1/3) 12'; Pen: Burns (2/2) 20', 27'	Report	Try: Penalty try 51' c Con: Padovani (1/1) 51'; Pen: Padovani (1/1) 58'

Kingsholm Stadium
Attendance: 9,973
Referee: Andrew Brace (IRFU)

19 November 2015
20:45

La Rochelle (France)	20–33	(England) Gloucester
Try: Audy 9' c Eaton 43' c Con: Fortassin (2/2) 10', 44'; Pen: Fortassin (2/4) 4', 40'	Report	Try: Morgan 5' c McColl 69' c Sharples 77' c Con: Laidlaw (1/1) 5'; Twelvetrees (2/2) 70', 78'; Pen: Laidlaw (4/4) 1', 24', 28', 36'

Stade Marcel-Deflandre
Attendance: 12,763
Referee: Marius Mitrea (FIR)

21 November 2015
15:00

Zebre (Italy)	27–8	(England) Worcester Warriors
Try: Violi 1' c Boni 14' m Con: Canna (1/2) 1'; Pen: Canna (4/4) 5', 33', 46', 69'; Drop: Canna (1/1) 18'	Report	Try: Hammond 77' m Pen: Lamb (1/2) 22'

Stadio Sergio Lanfranchi
Attendance: 1,784
Referee: Tual Trainini (FFR)

10 December 2015
19:45

Worcester Warriors (England)	22–34	(England) Gloucester (1 BP)
Try: Hammond 12' c Daniels 63' c O'Shea 78' m Con: Lamb (2/3) 14', 64'; Drop: Lamb (1/1) 40'	Report	Try: Purdy (2) 34' c, 51' c Cook 57' m McColl 66' c Twelvetrees 72' m Con: Laidlaw (3/4) 35', 52', 68'; Pen: Laidlaw (1/2) 9'

Sixways Stadium
Attendance: 6,774
Referee: Alexandre Ruiz (FFR)

11 December 2015
20:00

(1 BP) La Rochelle (France)	27–19	(Italy) Zebre
Try: Lapeyre 14' c Qovu 17' m Murimurivalu 31' m Fortassin 57' c Con: Fortassin (1/3) 15'; Le Bail (1/1) 58'; Pen: Fortassin (1/1) 10'	Report	Try: Toniolatti 61' m Palazzani 68' c Penalty try 80' c Con: Padovani (2/3) 68', 80'

Stade Marcel-Deflandre
Attendance: 10,600
Referee: Tom Foley (RFU)

17 December 2015
19:45

Gloucester (England)	27–13	(England) Worcester Warriors
Try: Laidlaw 21' c Kvesic 67' m Con: Laidlaw (1/1) 22'; Pen: Laidlaw (5/5) 10', 19', 40', 48', 53'	Report	Try: Howard 13' c Con: Lamb (1/1) 14'; Pen: Lamb (2/2) 12', 50'

Kingsholm Stadium
Attendance: 10,942
Referee: Ian Davies (WRU)

19 December 2015
15:00

Zebre (Italy)	25–5	(France) La Rochelle
Try: Derbyshire 23' m Meyer 41' c Muliaina 75' c Con: Padovani (1/2) 42'; Canna (1/1) 76'; Pen: Padovani (2/4) 4', 9'	Report	Try: Januarie 80' m

Stadio Sergio Lanfranchi
Attendance: 1,657
Referee: Lloyd Linton (SRU)

16 January 2016
15:00

Gloucester (England)	20–10	(France) La Rochelle
Try: Cook 16' c Twelvetrees 40' c Con: Laidlaw (2/2) 16', 40'; Pen: Laidlaw (2/2) 8', 51'	Report	Try: Lapeyre 54' c Con: Audy (1/1) 55'; Pen: Audy (1/1) 33'

Kingsholm Stadium
Attendance: 9,209
Referee: David Wilkinson (IRFU)

16 January 2016
15:00

(1 BP) Worcester Warriors (England)	15–22	(Italy) Zebre
Try: Baldwin 22' c Hammond 75' m Con: Symons (1/2) 23'; Pen: Symons (1/1) 43'	Report	Try: van Zyl 17' c Con: Haimona (1/1) 18'; Pen: Beyers (1/2) 10'; Haimona (1/1) 26'; Padovani (3/4) 59', 70', 80'

Sixways Stadium
Attendance: 6,134
Referee: Thomas Charabas (FFR)

22 January 2016
19:30

(1 BP) La Rochelle (France)	35–11	(England) Worcester Warriors
Try: Graham 49' m Lapeyre 52' c Murimurivalu 69' c Qovu 76' c Con: Audy (1/2) 53'; Barraque (2/2) 70', 77'; Pen: Holmes (2/2) 21', 31'; Audy (1/1) 43'	Report	Try: Baldwin 65' m Pen: Symons (2/2) 3', 7'

Stade Marcel-Deflandre
Attendance: 8,500
Referee: Elia Rizzo (FIR)

23 January 2016
15:00

(1 BP) Zebre (Italy)	11–14	(England) Gloucester
Try: van Schalkwyk 72' m Pen: Padovani (2/3) 1', 5'	Report	Try: Atkinson 51' m Pen: Burns (3/3) 28', 68', 75'

Stadio Sergio Lanfranchi
Attendance: 2,413
Referee: Gary Conway (IRFU)

=== Pool 5 ===
Pos	Team	Pld	W	D	L	PF	PA	PD	TF	TA	TB	LB	Pts
1	(France) Grenoble (4)	6	5	0	1	187	154	+33	22	19	2	0	22
2	(England) London Irish (8)	6	3	0	3	170	106	+64	25	10	3	2	17
3	(Scotland) Edinburgh	6	4	0	2	125	103	+22	14	12	1	0	17
4	(France) Agen	6	0	0	6	98	217	−119	13	32	1	1	2

Source: espn.co.uk

13 November 2015
19:30

Edinburgh (Scotland)	28–10	(France) Grenoble
Try: du Preez (2) 5' m, 78' c Penalty try 59' c Con: Hidalgo-Clyne (1/2) 62'; Tonks (1/1) 79'; Pen: Hidalgo-Clyne (3/3) 32', 39', 44'	Report	Try: Kilioni 70' c Con: Bosch (1/1) 71'; Pen: Hart (1/1) 49'

Murrayfield Stadium
Attendance: 3,264
Referee: Ben Whitehouse (WRU)

14 November 2015
15:00

(1 BP) London Irish (England)	48–10	(France) Agen
Try: Williams 10' m Ellis (2) 22' m, 36' c Trayfoot 30' c Lewington (2) 43' m, 67' m McCusker 56' c Maitland 59' c Con: Noakes (4/7) 30', 37', 58', 60'	Report	Try: Vergnon 64' c Con: Darbo (1/1) 64'; Pen: Bouvier (1/1) 4'

Madejski Stadium
Attendance: 4,216
Referee: Gary Conway (IRFU)

20 November 2015
19:30

Agen (France)	6–27	(Scotland) Edinburgh
Pen: Darbo (2/2) 50', 55'	Report	Try: Penalty try 32' c du Preez 42' c Hardie 69' c Con: Tonks (3/3) 33', 43', 70'; Pen: Tonks (2/2) 20', 23'

Stade Armandie
Attendance: 4,532
Referee: Peter Fitzgibbon (IRFU)

21 November 2015
20:45

Grenoble (France)	27–20	(England) London Irish (1 BP)
Try: Heguy 5' c Alexandre 10' c Gelin 80' c Con: Bosch (2/2) 6', 11'; Loustalot (1/1) 80'; Pen: Bosch (2/2) 17', 51'	Report	Try: Williams 13' c Sinclair 40' c Con: Noakes (1/1) 14'; Brophy-Clews (1/1) 40'; Pen: Brophy-Clews (2/2) 44', 48'

Stade des Alpes
Attendance: 8,500
Referee: Ian Davies (WRU)

10 December 2015
20:45

Agen (France)	20–40	(France) Grenoble (1 BP)
Try: Barthomeuf (2) 47' m, 56' c Deguilhem 61' m Con: Bouvier (1/3) 57'; Pen: Guemes (1/1) 11'	Report	Try: Mignot (2) 1' c, 73' m Taumalolo (3) 5' c, 29' c, 34' c Penalty try 67' c Con: Bosch (4/4) 2', 6', 30', 36'; Loustalot (1/2) 68'

Stade Armandie
Attendance: 3,932
Referee: Ian Davies (WRU)

12 December 2015
15:00

(1 BP) London Irish (England)	38–6	(Scotland) Edinburgh
Try: Fenby (3) 9' m, 13' c, 76' c Lewington 27' c Williams 40' c Tikoirotuma 60' m Con: Geraghty (4/6) 14', 28', 40', 77'	Report	Pen: Tonks (2/3) 3', 8'

Madejski Stadium
Attendance: 3,959
Referee: Leighton Hodges (WRU)

17 December 2015
19:30

(1 BP) Grenoble (France)	48–45	(France) Agen (2 BP)
Try: Hunt 18' c Barcella 41' c Nemani (2) 46' c, 79' c Estebanez 56' c Gelin 73' c Con: Wisniewski (3/3) 18', 42', 47'; Estebanez (1/1) 57'; Bosch (2/2) 73', 80'; Pen: Wisniewski (2/2) 33', 40'	Report	Try: Bastien 2' m Barthomeuf 22' m Nakosi (2) 26' c, 67' c Braendlin (2) 36' c, 61' c Sicart 63' c Con: Bouvier (2/4) 28', 37'; Darbo (3/3) 61', 64', 68'

Stade des Alpes
Attendance: 9,370
Referee: Tom Foley (RFU)

18 December 2015
19:30

Edinburgh (Scotland)	18–15	(England) London Irish (1 BP)
Try: Brown 16' c Hardie 71' m Con: Hidalgo-Clyne (1/2) 17'; Pen: Hidalgo-Clyne (2/3) 20', 36'	Report	Try: Ellis 8' m Smallbone 59 'c Con: Geraghty (1/2) 60'; Pen: Geraghty (1/1) 28'

Murrayfield Stadium
Attendance: 3,551
Referee: David Wilkinson (IRFU)

15 January 2016
19:30

(1 BP) Edinburgh (Scotland)	23–0	(France) Agen
Try: Bradbury 35' m Coman 59' m Tonks 68' m Watson 73' m Pen: Tonks (1/1) 19'	Report

Murrayfield Stadium
Attendance: 3,100
Referee: Ian Davies (WRU)

16 January 2016
15:00

London Irish (England)	18–28	(France) Grenoble
Try: Waldouck 74' c Lewington 80' m Con: Geraghty (1/2) 75'; Pen: Geraghty (2/2) 1', 15'	Report	Try: Batlle 18' m Hunt 27' c McLeod 44' c Con: Wisniewski (2/3) 28', 46'; Pen: Wisniewski (3/3) 7', 10', 24'

Madejski Stadium
Attendance: 3,684
Referee: Marius Mitrea (FIR)

23 January 2016
20:45

Agen (France)	17–31	(England) London Irish (1 BP)
Try: Nakosi 30' c Narjissi 50' c Con: Bouvier (2/2) 31', 51'; Pen: Bouvier (1/1) 26'	Report	Try: Narraway 3' m Fowlie 16' c Smallbone 27' c Mulchrone 64' m Penalty try 74' c Con: Geraghty (3/5) 18', 28', 75'

Stade Armandie
Attendance: 3,712
Referee: Lloyd Linton (SRU)

23 January 2016
20:45

Grenoble (France)	34–23	(Scotland) Edinburgh
Try: Heguy 30' c Aplon (2) 69' c, 78' m Con: Wisniewski (2/3) 32', 70'; Pen: Wisniewski (5/6) 15', 18', 51', 57', 77'	Report	Try: Hardie 3' c Helu 34' c Con: Hidalgo-Clyne (2/2) 5', 35'; Pen: Hidalgo-Clyne (3/4) 27', 54', 67'

Stade des Alpes
Attendance: 10,072
Referee: Greg Garner (RFU)

== See also ==
- 2015–16 European Rugby Challenge Cup
