= 2017–18 European Rugby Challenge Cup pool stage =

- Season: 2017–18 European Rugby Challenge Cup
- Date: 12 October 2017 – 20 January 2018

Qualifiers
- Seed 1: (France) Pau
- Seed 2: (England) Newcastle Falcons
- Seed 3: (Ireland) Connacht
- Seed 4: (Scotland) Edinburgh
- Seed 5: (Wales) Cardiff Blues
- Seed 6: (England) Gloucester
- Seed 7: (France) Brive
- Seed 8: (France) Stade Français

Locations of British and Irish teams of the 2017–18 European Rugby Challenge Cup group stage.
Brown: Pool 1; Red: Pool 2; Orange: Pool 3; Yellow: Pool 4;
Green: Pool 5.
Locations of French and Italian teams of the 2017–18 European Rugby Challenge Cup group stage.
Brown: Pool 1; Red: Pool 2; Orange: Pool 3; Yellow: Pool 4;
Green: Pool 5.
Locations of Russian teams of the 2017–18 European Rugby Challenge Cup group stage.
Brown: Pool 1; Yellow: Pool 4.

The 2017–18 European Rugby Challenge Cup pool stage was the first stage of the competition in the fourth season of the European Rugby Challenge Cup.

The competition involves twenty teams competing, across five pools of four teams, for eight quarter-final places – awarded to the five pool winners and the three top-ranked pool runners-up.

The pool stage began on 12 October 2017 and was completed on 20 January 2018.

== Seeding ==
The twenty competing teams were seeded and split into four tiers; seeding was based on performance in their respective domestic leagues. Where promotion and relegation is in effect in a league, the promoted team was seeded last, or (if multiple teams are promoted) by performance in the lower competition.

Rank	Top 14	Premiership	Pro 12	Continental Shield
1	(France) Stade Français	(England) Newcastle Falcons	(Wales) Cardiff Blues	(Russia) Enisey-STM
2	(France) Brive	(England) Gloucester	(Ireland) Connacht	(Russia) Krasny Yar
3	(France) Pau	(England) Sale Sharks	(Scotland) Edinburgh	
4	(France) Lyon	(England) Worcester Warriors	(Wales) Dragons	
5	(France) Bordeaux	(England) London Irish	(Italy) Zebre	
6	(France) Toulouse			
7	(France) Oyonnax			
8	(France) Agen			

Teams will be taken from a league in order of rank and put into a tier. A draw was used to allocate two second seeds to Tier 1; the remaining team went into Tier 2. This allocation indirectly determined which fourth-seeded team entered Tier 2, while the others entered Tier 3.

Given the nature of the Continental Shield, a competition including developing rugby nations and Italian clubs not competing in the Pro12, qualifying teams are automatically included in Tier 4, and are, in effect, seeded equally despite officially being ranked 1/2 from that competition.

The brackets show each team's seeding and their league (for example, 1 Top 14 indicates the team was seeded 1st from the Top 14).

Tier 1	(England) Newcastle Falcons (1 AP)	(Wales) Cardiff Blues (1 Pro12)	(France) Stade Français (1 Top 14)	(England) Gloucester Rugby (2 AP)	(France) Brive (2 Top 14)
Tier 2	(Ireland) Connacht (2 Pro12)	(England) Sale Sharks (3 AP)	(Scotland) Edinburgh (3 Pro12)	(France) Pau (3 Top 14)	(Wales) Dragons (4 Pro12)
Tier 3	(England) Worcester Warriors (4 AP)	(France) Lyon (4 Top 14)	(England) London Irish (5 AP)	(France) Bordeaux (5 Top 14)	(Italy) Zebre (5 Pro 12)
Tier 4	(France) Toulouse (6 Top 14)	(France) Oyonnax (7 Top 14)	(France) Agen (8 Top 14)	(Russia) Enisey-STM (CS 1)	(Russia) Krasny Yar (CS 2)

== Pool stage ==
The draw took place on 8 June 2017, in Neuchâtel, Switzerland.

Teams in the same pool play each other twice, both at home and away in the group stage, beginning on the weekend of 12/13/14 October 2017, and continuing through to 19/20 January 2018, before the pool winners and three best runners-up progressed to the quarter-finals.

Teams are awarded competition points, based on match result. Teams receive 4 points for a win, 2 points for a draw, 1 attacking bonus point for scoring four or more tries in a match and 1 defensive bonus point for losing a match by seven points or fewer.

In the event of a tie between two or more teams, the following tie-breakers will be used, as directed by EPCR:

1. Where teams have played each other
  1. The club with the greater number of competition points from only matches involving tied teams.
  2. If equal, the club with the best aggregate points difference from those matches.
  3. If equal, the club that scored the most tries in those matches.
2. Where teams remain tied and/or have not played each other in the competition (i.e. are from different pools)
  1. The club with the best aggregate points difference from the pool stage.
  2. If equal, the club that scored the most tries in the pool stage.
  3. If equal, the club with the fewest players suspended in the pool stage.
  4. If equal, the drawing of lots will determine a club's ranking.

Key to colours
Winner of each pool, advance to quarter-finals.
Three highest-scoring second-place teams advance to quarter-finals.

=== Pool 1 ===
Pos	Team	Pld	W	D	L	PF	PA	PD	TF	TA	TB	LB	Pts
1	(England) Newcastle Falcons (2)	6	6	0	0	229	122	+107	33	15	4	0	28
2	(Wales) Dragons	6	3	0	3	156	133	+23	21	17	2	2	16
3	(France) Bordeaux Bègles	6	3	0	3	190	178	+12	26	24	3	1	16
4	(Russia) Enisei-STM	6	0	0	6	91	233	−142	12	36	0	1	1

Source: espn.co.uk

13 October 2017
15:00

Enisei-STM (Russia)	17–57	(France) Bordeaux Bègles (1 BP)
Try: Baranovs 38' c Selskii 48' c Con: Kushnarev (2/2) 39', 49'; Drop: Gaisin (1/1) 63'	Report	Try: Roumat 4' c Ravai 19' c Cazeaux 26' c Dubié (2) 30' m, 73' c Jalibert 44' c Lesgourgues 76' c Kamikamica 79' c Con: Jalibert (4/5) 5', 21', 26', 45'; Schoeman (3/3) 74', 77', 80'; Pen: Jalibert (1/1) 11'

Krasny Yar Stadium
Attendance: 3,600
Referee: Craig Maxwell-Keys (RFU)

14 October 2017
15:00

(1 BP) Newcastle Falcons (England)	32–27	(Wales) Dragons (1 BP)
Try: Vickers 12' c Radwan 37' m Graham 52' c M. Wilson 61' c Con: Flood (3/4) 13', 53', 62'; Pen: Flood (2/2) 24', 76'	Report	Try: Landman 41' c Hewitt 49' c Howard 57' c Con: O'Brien (3/3) 42', 50', 58'; Pen: O'Brien (2/3) 20', 32'

Kingston Park
Attendance: 4,052
Referee: Pierre Brousset (FFR)

21 October 2017
15:00

(1 BP) Enisei-STM (Russia)	21–28	(Wales) Dragons (1 BP)
Try: Sel'skiy 52' c Penalty try 68'; Rudoy 78' c Con: Kushnarev (2/2) 52', 79'	Report	Try: Hill 16' c Rosser 22' c Amos 41' c Ellis 69'; Con: O'Brien (3/3) 17', 24', 42'; Henson (1/1) 70'

Slava Stadium, Moscow
Attendance: 800
Referee: Ian Tempest (RFU)

21 October 2017
18:30

(1 BP) Bordeaux Bègles (France)	20–21	(England) Newcastle Falcons
Try: Tauleigne 8' c Taofifénua 37' c Con: Hickey (2/2) 10', 38'; Pen: Hickey (2/3) 3', 52'	Report	Try: Burrows 25' c Flood 41' c Welsh 58' c Con: Flood (3/3) 26', 43', 59'

Stade Chaban-Delmas
Attendance: 17,211
Referee: Frank Murphy (IRFU)

8 December 2017
19:30

Dragons (Wales)	15–0	(Russia) Enisei-STM
Try: Warren (2) 22' m, 70' m Wainwright 53' m	Report

Rodney Parade
Attendance: 3,417
Referee: Vlad Iordăchescu (FRR)

9 December 2017
15:15

(1 BP) Newcastle Falcons (England)	54–24	(France) Bordeaux Bègles
Try: Green 3' c Radwan (2) 7' m, 31' c M. Wilson 27' c Sowrey 33' m Willis 40' c Tait 63' c Matavesi 76' c Con: Willis (4/6) 4', 28', 31', 40'; Hodgson (2/2) 65', 77'	Report	Try: Lesgourgues 5' c Jalibert 17' c Cros 55' c Con: Jalibert (2/2) 6', 18'; Volavola (1/1) 56'; Pen: Jalibert (1/1) 13'

Kingston Park
Attendance: 3,857
Referee: Ian Davies (WRU)

15 December 2017
19:30

(1 BP) Dragons (Wales)	25–27	(England) Newcastle Falcons
Try: Dee (2) 15' c, 21' c Hewitt 50' m Con: Henson (2/3) 16', 22'; Pen: Henson (1/1) 25'	Report	Try: Radwan 9' c Kibirige 11' c Graham 31' c Con: Hodgson (3/3) 10', 12', 32'; Pen: Hodgson (2/2) 27', 65'

Rodney Parade
Attendance: 3,949
Referee: Mike Adamson (SRU)

15 December 2017
20:30

(1 BP) Bordeaux Bègles (France)	36–27	(Russia) Enisei-STM
Try: Cros 8' c Etchverry 20' c Rey 24' c Kamikamica 50' m Gimbert 63' m Dufour 79' m Con: Volavola (3/6) 9', 21', 25'	Report	Try: Nepeivoda 35' c Rudoy (2) 60' c, 74' c Con: Kushnarev (3/3) 36', 60', 76'; Pen: Kushnarev (2/2) 14', 17'

Stade Chaban-Delmas
Attendance: 16,466
Referee: Joy Neville (IRFU)

13 January 2018
21:00

(1 BP) Bordeaux Bègles (France)	36–28	(Wales) Dragons
Try: Jalibert 35' m Connor 46' c Fuatai 55' c Cros (2) 60' c, 69' c Con: Jalibert (4/5) 47', 56', 61', 70'; Pen: Jalibert (1/1) 15'		Try: Benjamin 22' c Pretorius 51' c Meyer 80' m Con: Jones (2/2) 24', 52'; Pen: Jones (3/3) 17', 30', 34'

Stade Chaban-Delmas
Attendance: 14,232
Referee: Craig Maxwell-Keys (RFU)

14 January 2018
15:00

(1 BP) Newcastle Falcons (England)	64–7	(Russia) Enisei-STM
Try: Penny 1' c Hodgson (2) 11' c, 43' c Uzokwe 25' m G. Young 31' m Radwan (3) 45' m, 53' c, 76' c Kibirige 62' c Burrows 79' c Con: Flood (3/7) 1', 12', 43'; Hodgson (4/4) 54', 63', 76', 80'	Report	Try: Gargalyk 68' c Con: Kushnarev (1/1) 69'

Kingston Park
Attendance: 3,653
Referee: Pierre Brousset (FFR)

20 January 2018
14:00

Enisei-STM (Russia)	19–33	(England) Newcastle Falcons (1 BP)
Try: Giliberti 7' c Sychev 63' c Gachechiladze 78' m Con: Budychenko (2/3) 7', 64'	Report	Try: M. Wilson 18' m Radwan (3) 23' c, 37' c, 75' c Flood 34' c Con: Flood (4/5) 23', 35', 37', 76'

Avchala Stadium, Tbilisi, Georgia
Attendance: 500
Referee: David Wilkinson (IRFU)

20 January 2018
15:00

(1 BP) Dragons (Wales)	33–17	(France) Bordeaux Bègles
Try: Dee 23' m Hill 45' c Hewitt 59' c Fairbrother 63' c Howard 77' c Con: Henson (2/3) 46', 60'; Jones (2/2) 64', 78'; Pen: Henson (0/1)	Report	Try: Fuatai 53' c Gimbert 57' c Con: Volavola (1/1) 54'; Schoeman (1/1) 58'; Pen: Volavola (1/3) 3'

Rodney Parade
Attendance: 4,017
Referee: Andrew Brace (IRFU)

=== Pool 2 ===
Pos	Team	Pld	W	D	L	PF	PA	PD	TF	TA	TB	LB	Pts
1	(Wales) Cardiff Blues (5)	6	5	0	1	99	95	+4	12	10	1	0	21
2	(France) Toulouse	6	2	1	3	117	120	−3	14	13	2	2	14
3	(England) Sale Sharks	6	2	1	3	110	102	+8	12	11	0	2	12
4	(France) Lyon	6	2	0	4	121	130	−9	13	17	0	3	11

Source: espn.co.uk

13 October 2017
19:00

(1 BP) Cardiff Blues (Wales)	29–19	(France) Lyon
Try: Earle 22' c T. Williams 30' c Cook 51' m Lee-Lo 64' c Con: Evans (3/4) 23', 31', 65'; Pen: Shingler (1/1) 75'	Report	Try: Bruni 59' c Barassi 68' c Tuva 78' m Con: Dominguez (1/1) 59'; Pélissié (1/2) 69'

Cardiff Arms Park
Attendance: 5,691
Referee: Frank Murphy (IRFU)

13 October 2017
20:00

Sale Sharks (England)	20–20	(France) Toulouse
Try: Solomona 38' c Evans 49' c Con: De Klerk (2/2) 39', 50'; Pen: De Klerk (2/2) 23', 66'	Report	Try: Kunatani 14' c Bézy 33' c Con: Bézy (2/2) 15', 34'; Pen: Bézy (2/2) 54', 73'

AJ Bell Stadium
Attendance: 5,474
Referee: David Wilkinson (IRFU)

20 October 2017
19:30

Lyon (France)	27–24	(England) Sale Sharks (1 BP)
Try: Armitage 32' c Gill 67' c Belan 70' c Con: Beauxis (1/1) 33'; Michalak (2/2) 67', 71'; Pen: Beauxis (1/1) 6'; Michalak (1/1) 75'	Report	Try: Solomona 8' c James (2) 14' c, 56' c Con: De Klerk (3/3) 9', 15', 57'; Pen: De Klerk (1/2) 61'

Matmut Stadium de Gerland
Attendance: 12,863
Referee: Mike Adamson (SRU)

20 October 2017
21:00

(1 BP) Toulouse (France)	15–17	(Wales) Cardiff Blues
Try: Ntamack 27' c Dupont 35' m Con: Ntamack (1/2) 28'; Pen: Ntamack (1/1) 11'	Report	Try: N. Williams 15' c Cook 50' c Con: Evans (2/2) 15', 51'; Pen: Evans (1/1) 21'

Stade Ernest-Wallon
Attendance: 12,245
Referee: Tom Foley (RFU)

7 December 2017
20:45

(1 BP) Toulouse (France)	30–23	(France) Lyon (1 BP)
Try: Mjekevu (2) 25' c, 30' c Huget 43' m Guitoune 62' m Con: Doussain (2/4) 26', 31'; Pen: Doussain (2/2) 4', 10'	Report	Try: Belan 50' c Tuva 76' c Con: Pélissié (1/1) 51'; Michalak 76'; Pen: Pélissié (3/4) 37', 40', 47'

Stade Ernest-Wallon
Attendance: 9,104
Referee: JP Doyle (RFU)

9 December 2017
15:00

Sale Sharks (England)	24–0	(Wales) Cardiff Blues
Try: Cliff 58' c Jones 76' m Con: MacGinty (1/2) 59'; Pen: MacGinty (4/4) 2', 25', 40', 47'	Report

AJ Bell Stadium
Attendance: 5,494
Referee: Pierre Brousset (FFR)

16 December 2017
21:00

Lyon (France)	21–11	(France) Toulouse
Try: Puricelli 18' c Tuva 32' m Con: Pélissié (1/2) 19'; Pen: Pélissié (1/2) 40'; Beauxis (2/2) 63', 70'	Report	Try: Guitoune 8' m Pen: Bézy (1/2) 6'; Ntamack (1/1) 66'

Matmut Stadium de Gerland
Attendance: 12,404
Referee: Luke Pearce (RFU)

17 December 2017
15:15

Cardiff Blues (Wales)	14–6	(England) Sale Sharks
Try: Morgan 47' m Pen: Anscombe (3/4) 9', 54', 74'	Report	Pen: Cliff (2/3) 13', 65'

Cardiff Arms Park
Attendance: 4,974
Referee: Thomas Charabas (FFR)

13 January 2018
15:00

Sale Sharks (England)	15–13	(France) Lyon (1 BP)
Try: Ostrikov 20' m Beaumont 50' c Con: Cliff (1/2) 52'; Pen: Cliff (1/1) 49'	Report	Try: Lacombe 71' c Con: Michalak (1/1) 72'; Pen: Beauxis (2/2) 25', 42'

AJ Bell Stadium
Attendance: 3,259
Referee: Ben Whitehouse (WRU)

14 January 2018
17:30

Cardiff Blues (Wales)	18–13	(France) Toulouse (1 BP)
Try: T. Williams 29' c Anscombe 57' m Con: Evans (1/1) 30'; Pen: Evans (1/1) 6'; Anscombe (1/1) 76'	Report	Try: Kolbe 23' c Con: Ramos (1/1) 25'; Drop: Ramos (2/2) 40', 49'

Cardiff Arms Park
Attendance: 7,152
Referee: Ian Tempest (RFU)

20 January 2018
18:00

(1 BP) Lyon (France)	18–21	(Wales) Cardiff Blues
Try: Cretin 1' c Barassi 23' m Con: Beauxis (1/2) 1'; Pen: Beauxis (2/2) 53', 62'	Report	Try: L. Williams 39' c Penalty try 45'; T. Williams 66' c Con: Evans (2/2) 40', 67'

Matmut Stadium de Gerland
Attendance: 9,218
Referee: Matthew Carley (RFU)

20 January 2018
18:00

(1 BP) Toulouse (France)	28–21	(England) Sale Sharks (1 BP)
Try: Van Dyk 4' c Roumieu 22' c Marchand 49' c Kunatani 80' c Con: Ntamack (3/3) 5', 24', 50'; Bézy (1/1) 80'	Report	Try: Yarde 36' c James 41' c Beaumont 59' c Con: Addison (3/3) 37', 41', 60'

Stade Ernest-Wallon
Attendance: 9,462
Referee: Sean Gallagher (IRFU)

=== Pool 3 ===
Pos	Team	Pld	W	D	L	PF	PA	PD	TF	TA	TB	LB	Pts
1	(France) Pau (1)	6	6	0	0	207	125	+82	28	16	5	0	29
2	(England) Gloucester (6)	6	4	0	2	253	139	+114	37	18	4	1	21
3	(Italy) Zebre	6	1	0	5	133	257	−124	16	37	2	2	8
4	(France) Agen	6	1	0	5	148	220	−72	20	30	2	0	6

Source: espn.co.uk

12 October 2017
20:45

Pau (France)	27–21	(England) Gloucester (1 BP)
Try: Ramsay 16' c Slade 23' c Halai 72' c Con: Slade (3/3) 17', 24', 74'; Pen: Slade (2/2) 43', 49'	Report	Try: Ackermann 54' c Vellacott 69' c Purdy 80'c Con: Williams (3/3) 55', 70', 80'

Stade du Hameau
Attendance: 8,600
Referee: George Clancy (IRFU)

13 October 2017
20:00

(1 BP) Agen (France)	45–10	(Italy) Zebre
Try: Ngauamo 6' c Miquel 24' m Sadie 45' m Fouyssac 49' m Lamoulie (2) 61' m, 73' m Conduché 65' c Con: Lamoulie (1/4) 7'; Russell (1/2) 66'; Pen: Lamoulie (2/2) 18', 31'	Report	Try: Sarto 52' c Con: Palazzani (1/1) 53'; Pen: Palazzani (1/1) 11'

Stade Armandie
Attendance: 2,487
Referee: Ian Tempest (RFU)

19 October 2017
19:45

(1 BP) Gloucester (England)	61–16	(France) Agen
Try: Vellacott (2) 4' c, 56' m Trinder 15' c Morgan 21' c Savage 35' c Purdy 48' c Williams 50' c Hibbard 64' c Polledri 72' c Con: Burns (6/7) 5', 16', 22', 36', 49', 51'; Williams (2/2) 65', 73'	Report	Try: Holder 68' c Con: Russell (1/1) 69'; Pen: Verdu (3/3) 12', 26', 31'

Kingsholm Stadium
Attendance: 9,489
Referee: Dan Jones (WRU)

21 October 2017
15:00

(1 BP) Zebre (Italy)	33–38	(France) Pau (1 BP)
Try: Licata 7' c Boni 9' c Castello 27' c Con: Canna (3/3) 8', 10', 28'; Pen: Canna (4/4) 4', 32', 39', 80'	Report	Try: Votu 22' c Saili 52' c Penalty try (2) 63', 68'; Ramsay 76' c Con: Fajardo (2/2) 23', 53'; Taylor (1/1) 77'; Pen: Taylor (1/1) 72'

Stadio Sergio Lanfranchi
Attendance: 1,700
Referee: Craig Maxwell-Keys (RFU)

8 December 2017
20:00

Agen (France)	21–40	(France) Pau (1 BP)
Try: Saurs 20' c Qera (2) 38' c, 48' c Con: Verdu (2/2) 21', 40', 49'	Report	Try: Planté (2) 1' c, 41' c Hamadache 8' c Habel Kuffner 16' c Hurou 51' m Dougall 68' c Con: Daubagna (4/5) 1', 9', 17', 42'; Hastoy (1/1) 69'

Stade Armandie
Attendance: 4,547
Referee: Tom Foley (RFU)

9 December 2017
14:30

(2 BP) Zebre (Italy)	26–33	(England) Gloucester (1 BP)
Try: Meyer 9' c Giammarioli 16' c Boni 40' m Gaffney 70' c Con: Canna (2/3) 10', 17'; Palazzani (1/1) 71'	Report	Try: Ackermann 25' c Thorley (2) 36' c, 43' c Williams 49' c Hibbard 67' m Con: Williams (4/5) 27', 37', 44', 50'

Stadio Sergio Lanfranchi
Attendance: 2,500
Referee: Mike Adamson (SRU)

14 December 2017
20:45

(1 BP) Pau (France)	26–12	(France) Agen
Try: Rey 11' c Stanley 29' c Dougall 71' c Bouchet 80' m Con: Fajardo (2/2) 12', 30'; Lebail (1/2) 71'	Report	Try: Tanga (2) 47' m, 77' c Con: Lamoulie (1/2) 78'

Stade du Hameau
Attendance: 8,129
Referee: Sean Gallagher (IRFU)

16 December 2017
15:00

(1 BP) Gloucester (England)	69–12	(Italy) Zebre
Try: Halaifonua (2) 8' c, 16' m Thorley (4) 12' m, 43' c, 56' c, 76' m Clarke 20' c Safe 26' c Sharples 35' c Orr 40' c Matu'u 46' m Con: Twelvetrees (6/9) 10', 21', 27', 35', 40', 44'; Williams (1/2) 57'	Report	Try: Bordoli 70' m Biagi 80' c Con: Bordoli (1/2) 80'

Kingsholm Stadium
Attendance: 8,927
Referee: Pierre Brousset (FFR)

12 January 2018
19:30

(1 BP) Agen (France)	24–45	(England) Gloucester (1 BP)
Try: Kotze 29' m Sadie 47' c Qera 56' m Jegerlhener 72' c Con: Verdu (1/3) 48'; Russell (1/1) 73'	Report	Try: Purdy (2) 5' c, 10' c Braley 17' c Woodward 34' c Atkinson 41' c Slater 68' c Con: Williams (6/6) 6', 12', 18', 35', 42', 69'; Pen: Williams (1/1) 64'

Stade Armandie
Attendance: 2,870
Referee: Frank Murphy (IRFU)

13 January 2018
18:00

(1 BP) Pau (France)	42–14	(Italy) Zebre
Try: Vatubua 1' c Bouchet 15' c Penalty try 25'; Tutaia 34' c Saili 46' c Halai 51' c Con: Fajardo (1/1) 2'; Lebail (4/4) 17', 35', 47', 52'	Report	Try: Licata (2) 8' c, 56' c Con: Palazzani (2/2) 9', 56'

Stade du Hameau
Attendance: 7,700
Referee: Joy Neville (IRFU)

19 January 2018
19:45

Gloucester (England)	24–34	(France) Pau (1 BP)
Try: Thrush 14' c Braley 62' c Polledri 78' c Con: Twelvetrees (3/3) 15', 63', 78'; Pen: Twelvetrees (1/1) 44'	Report	Try: Armitage 39' c Halai 55' c Adriaanse 58' c Ramsay 67' c Con: Slade (4/4) 39', 55', 60', 68'; Pen: Slade (2/3) 28', 35'

Kingsholm Stadium
Attendance: 12,489
Referee: John Lacey (IRFU)

20 January 2018
15:00

(1 BP) Zebre (Italy)	38–30	(France) Agen
Try: Violi 3' c Bisegni 17' m Minozzi 33' c Meyer 43' c Con: Canna (3/4) 3', 34', 44'; Pen: Canna (3/3) 60', 77', 80'	Report	Try: Tolot 1' c Conduché 6' c Saurs 72' c Con: Verdu (2/2) 1', 7'; Russell (1/1) 72'; Pen: Verdu (3/3) 39', 40', 53'

Stadio Sergio Lanfranchi
Attendance: 2,000
Referee: Vlad Iordăchescu (FRR)

=== Pool 4 ===
Pos	Team	Pld	W	D	L	PF	PA	PD	TF	TA	TB	LB	Pts
1	(Scotland) Edinburgh (4)	6	5	0	1	282	98	+184	40	12	4	1	25
2	(France) Stade Français (8)	6	3	0	3	151	166	−15	21	21	3	2	17
3	(England) London Irish	6	3	0	3	169	154	+15	24	22	3	1	16
4	(Russia) Krasny Yar	6	1	0	5	106	290	−184	13	43	1	1	6

Source: espn.co.uk

14 October 2017
15:00

(1 BP) Krasny Yar (Russia)	34–29	(France) Stade Français (2 BP)
Try: Bitiev 9' m Gresev (2) 18' m, 66' c Fukofuka 27' c Mahu 31' c Con: Malaghuradze (3/5) 28', 32', 67'; Pen: Malaghuradze (1/1) 75'	Report	Try: Arias (2) 5' c, 56' c Ensor 11' c Bouhraoua 33' m Qadiri 77' m Con: Geraghty (2/4) 12', 57'

Krasny Yar Stadium
Attendance: 3,600
Referee: Ian Davies (WRU)

14 October 2017
15:00

London Irish (England)	14–37	(Scotland) Edinburgh (1 BP)
Try: Hoskins 30' m Pen: Brophy-Clews (3/4) 9', 37', 54'	Report	Try: Hoyland 21' c Rasolea (2) 25' m, 34' m Ritchie 77' c Crosbie 80' c Con: Tovey (1/2) 22'; Hidalgo-Clyne (2/3) 78', 80'; Pen: Hidalgo-Clyne (2/2) 32', 57'

Madejski Stadium
Attendance: 4,099
Referee: Dan Jones (WRU)

21 October 2017
12:00

Krasny Yar (Russia)	14–73	(Scotland) Edinburgh (1 BP)
Try: Kolomiytsev 59' c Kondakov 79' c Con: Malaghuradze (2/2) 60', 80'	Report	Try: Kinghorn (2) 4' c, 64' c Hidalgo-Clyne 6' c Carmichael 11' c Cochrane 31' c McCallum (2) 42' c, 49' c Penalty try 56'; McKenzie 69' c McInally 76' c Con: Tovey (3/3) 5', 7', 12'; Hidalgo-Clyne (3/3) 32', 43', 50'; Kinghorn (3/3) 65', 70', 76'; Pen: Hidalgo-Clyne (1/1) 37'

Fili Stadium, Moscow
Attendance: 1,000
Referee: Thomas Charabas (FFR)

21 October 2017
20:45

Stade Français (France)	7–44	(England) London Irish (1 BP)
Try: Meïté 18' c Con: Plisson (1/1) 18'	Report	Try: Gilsenan 4' m Ojo (2) 7' c, 11' c Meehan 37' m Chawatama 72' m Ransom 76' m Steele 80' c Con: Brophy-Clews (2/6) 8', 12'; Atkins (1/1) 80'; Pen: Brophy-Clews (1/1) 67'

Stade Jean-Bouin
Attendance: 5,666
Referee: Vlad Iordachescu (FRR)

8 December 2017
20:00

(1 BP) Stade Français (France)	39–24	(Russia) Krasny Yar
Try: Yobo (2) 24' c, 35' c Fisiihoi 60' c Martial 65' c Arias 78' m Con: Geraghty (4/4) 25', 37', 60', 66'; Pen: Geraghty (2/3) 2', 48'	Report	Try: Pruidze 45' c Prepelita 73' m Con: Malaghuradze (1/1) 46'; Pen: Malaghuradze (3/3) 9', 14', 27'; Drop: Malaghuradze 20'

Stade Jean-Bouin
Attendance: 8,562
Referee: Dan Jones (WRU)

9 December 2017
19:35

(1 BP) Edinburgh (Scotland)	50–20	(England) London Irish
Try: McInally 7' m Kinghorn 22' c Burleigh (2) 32' c, 34' c Hidalgo-Clyne 47' m Graham 50' m Rasolea 66' c Kennedy 79' c Con: Van der Walt (3/6) 22', 32', 34'; Kinghorn (2/2) 66', 79'	Report	Try: Ransom 30' c Northcote-Green 55' m Meehan 77' m Con: Tonks (1/2) 30'

Murrayfield Stadium
Attendance: 3,560
Referee: Sean Gallagher (IRFU)

15 December 2017
19:35

(1 BP) Edinburgh (Scotland)	78–0	(Russia) Krasny Yar
Try: Van der Merwe (2) 1' c, 76' c Dean 14' c Carmichael 16' c Ritchie 18' c Kinghorn 21' c Kennedy 29' c Cochrane 35' m Graham 41' m Hoyland 58' m Rasolea 65' c Fenton 69' c Con: Kinghorn (6/8) 2', 14', 17', 20', 22', 30'; Hidalgo-Clyne (3/4) 67', 70', 77'	Report

Murrayfield Stadium
Attendance: 2,773
Referee: David Wilkinson (IRFU)

16 December 2017
15:00

(1 BP) London Irish (England)	20–26	(France) Stade Français (1 BP)
Try: Steele 25' c Penalty try 47'; Con: Tonks (1/1) 26'; Pen: Tonks (2/3) 36', 77'	Report	Try: Martial 15' c Melikidze 53' m Nayacalevu 65' c Ensor 80' c Con: Geraghty (2/3) 53', 65'; Plisson (1/1) 80'

Madejski Stadium
Attendance: 5,800
Referee: Ben Whitehouse (WRU)

12 January 2018
19:35

Edinburgh (Scotland)	34–33	(France) Stade Français (1 BP)
Try: Watson 48' c Van der Walt 64' m Rasolea 77' c Con: Hidalgo-Clyne (1/1) 48'; Kinghorn (1/1) 78'; Pen: Hidalgo-Clyne (4/4) 6', 18', 25', 40'; Van der Walt (1/1) 70'	Report	Try: Macalou 45' c Nayacalevu 59' c Melikidze 71' c Con: Plisson (3/3) 45', 59', 72'; Pen: Plisson (4/4) 8', 14', 42', 57'

Murrayfield Stadium
Attendance: 4,468
Referee: Tom Foley (RFU)

13 January 2018
15:00

(1 BP) London Irish (England)	47–17	(Russia) Krasny Yar
Try: Loader 10' c Brophy-Clews (4) 53' c, 63' c, 69' c, 74' c Chawatama 66' m Cokanasiga 71' c Con: Bell (2/2) 11', 53'; Atkins (4/5) 64', 70', 72', 75'	Report	Try: Pruidze 6' c Latu 78' c Con: Malaghuradze (2/2) 7', 79'; Pen: Malaghuradze (1/1) 35'

Madejski Stadium
Attendance: 4,746
Referee: Mike Adamson (SRU)

20 January 2018
17:00

(1 BP) Krasny Yar (Russia)	17–24	(England) London Irish (1 BP)
Try: Arhip 26' c Tsnobiladze 42' c Con: Malaghuradze (1/1) 27'; Apikotoa (1/1) 43'; Pen: Malaghuradze (1/1) 3'	Report	Try: M. Williams 9' c Fowlie (2) 52' m, 66' c Loader 71' m Con: Atkins (2/4) 10', 67'

Avchala Stadium, Tbilisi, Georgia
Attendance: 500
Referee: Pierre Brousset (FFR)

20 January 2018
21:00

Stade Français (France)	17–10	(Scotland) Edinburgh (1 BP)
Try: Alo-Emile 2' c Danty 7' m Parisse 59' m Con: Geraghty (1/2) 3'	Report	Try: Hoyland 51' m Fife 73' m

Stade Jean-Bouin
Attendance: 8,454
Referee: Frank Murphy (IRFU)

=== Pool 5 ===
Pos	Team	Pld	W	D	L	PF	PA	PD	TF	TA	TB	LB	Pts
1	(Ireland) Connacht (3)	6	5	1	0	225	102	+123	29	15	4	0	26
2	(France) Brive (7)	6	3	0	3	161	162	−1	23	19	4	1	17
3	(England) Worcester Warriors	6	2	1	3	124	133	−9	16	17	3	2	15
4	(France) Oyonnax	6	1	0	5	102	215	−113	11	28	0	0	4

Source: espn.co.uk

14 October 2017
15:00

(1 BP) Worcester Warriors (England)	30–20	(France) Brive
Try: Taufete'e (3) 16' m, 36' m, 40' c Waller 60' c Con: Lance (2/3) 40', 61'; Pen: Lance (2/2) 42', 54'	Report	Try: Namy (2) 8' c, 43' m Brugnaut 73' m Con: Ugalde (1/2) 10'; Pen: Ugalde (1/1) 20'

Sixways Stadium
Attendance: 6,728
Referee: Sean Gallagher (IRFU)

14 October 2017
20:00

Oyonnax (France)	15–43	(Ireland) Connacht (1 BP)
Try: Tian 25' c Müller 30' m Con: Audy (1/2) 26'; Pen: Ruiz (1/1) 3'	Report	Try: Healy (2) 3' c, 51' c Kelleher 11' m McKeon 22' c Leader 79' m Con: Deegan (3/5) 4', 24', 52'; Pen: Deegan (4/4) 38', 44', 57', 61'

Stade de Genève
Attendance: 3,500
Referee: Tom Foley (RFU)

20 October 2017
19:00

(1 BP) Brive (France)	38–13	(France) Oyonnax
Try: Hauman 13' c Jourdain (2) 19' c, 30' c Laranjeira 37' c Mignardi 79' c Con: Germain (4/4) 14', 20', 31', 38'; Laranjeira (1/1) 80'; Pen: Germain (1/1) 6'	Report	Try: Fuertes 63' m Seuteni 75' m Pen: Audy (1/1) 4'

Stade Amédée-Domenech
Attendance: 4,500
Referee: David Wilkinson (IRFU)

21 October 2017
15:00

Connacht (Ireland)	15–8	(England) Worcester Warriors (1 BP)
Try: E. Masterson 5' m Healy 57' c Con: J. Carty (1/2) 58'; Pen: J. Carty (1/1) 20'	Report	Try: Adams 51' m Pen: Lance (1/1) 74'

Galway Sportsgrounds
Attendance: 3,879
Referee: Ian Davies (WRU)

9 December 2017
15:00

(1 BP) Worcester Warriors (England)	35–14	(France) Oyonnax
Try: Howe (2) 33' c, 59' m Baldwin 68' c Denton 74' c Con: Olver (3/4) 34', 69', 75'; Pen: Olver (3/3) 23', 26', 52'	Report	Try: Elliot 5' m Pen: Ruiz (3/3) 13', 28', 44'

Sixways Stadium
Attendance: 6,520
Referee: Frank Murphy (IRFU)

9 December 2017
21:00

(2 BP) Brive (France)	31–38	(Ireland) Connacht (1 BP)
Try: Tadjer (2) 15' c, 45' c Cazenave 24' c Brugnaut 28' m Namy 70' m Con: Germain (3/4) 16', 25', 47'	Report	Try: Dillane 31' c Marmion 39' c J. Carty 48' c Kelleher 61' m Con: J. Carty (3/4) 32', 40', 49'; Pen: J. Carty (4/4) 6', 43', 59', 67'

Stade Amédée-Domenech
Attendance: 3,000
Referee: Craig Maxwell-Keys (RFU)

15 December 2017
20:00

Oyonnax (France)	27–20	(England) Worcester Warriors (1 BP)
Try: Lasmarrigues 26' c Audy 31' c Ursache 55' c Con: Audy (3/3) 27', 32', 55'; Pen: Audy (2/3) 20', 39'	Report	Try: Olver 53' c Fa'osiliva 71' c Con: Olver (2/2) 54', 72'; Pen: Olver (2/3) 16', 44'

Stade Charles-Mathon
Attendance: 3,500
Referee: Vlad Iordachescu (FRR)

16 December 2017
15:00

(1 BP) Connacht (Ireland)	55–10	(France) Brive
Try: Healy (4) 5' c, 49' c, 57' c, 69' c J. Carty 32' c Marmion 60' c Farrell 74' c Con: J. Carty (7/7) 6', 33', 50', 59', 61', 70', 75'; Pen: J. Carty (2/2) 12', 41'	Report	Try: Germain 29' c Con: Germain (1/1) 29'; Pen: Germain (1/1) 39'

Galway Sportsgrounds
Attendance: 5,572
Referee: Ian Tempest (RFU)

13 January 2018
15:00

(1 BP) Worcester Warriors (England)	24–24	(Ireland) Connacht
Try: Humphreys (2) 1' c, 22' m Lewis 4' m Adams 38' c Con: Pennell (2/3) 3', 40'	Report	Try: Muldoon 16' c Adeolokun 26' c O'Halloran 59' c Con: Ronaldson (3/3) 17', 26', 59'; Pen: Ronaldson (1/1) 53'

Sixways Stadium
Attendance: 6,670
Referee: Alexandre Ruiz (FFR)

13 January 2018
19:30

Oyonnax (France)	19–29	(France) Brive (1 BP)
Try: Lima 80' c Con: Fuertes (1/1) 80'; Pen: Audy (4/4) 2', 15', 37', 40'	Report	Try: Mafi 7' c Le Bourhis 25' m Burotu 48' c Masilevu 59' c Con: Bézy (3/4) 8', 49', 60'; Pen: Bézy (1/1) 34'

Stade Charles-Mathon
Attendance: 3,500
Referee: Ian Davies (WRU)

20 January 2018
14:30

(1 BP) Connacht (Ireland)	50–14	(France) Oyonnax
Try: Adeolokun (3) 1' m, 3' c, 31' m Aki 10' c O'Halloran 19' m Healy 33' c Farrell 66' c Penalty try 75'; Con: Ronaldson (2/4) 3', 11'; O'Halloran (2/3) 34', 67'	Report	Try: Müller 16' c Ikpefan 39' c Con: Fuertes (1/1) 17'; Hall (1/1) 40'

Galway Sportsgrounds
Attendance: 5,017
Referee: Craig Maxwell-Keys (RFU)

20 January 2018
20:00

(1 BP) Brive (France)	33–7	(England) Worcester Warriors
Try: Koyamaibole (2) 29' c, 38' c Masilevu 45' c Waqaniburotu 58' m Burotu 79' c Con: Germain (4/5) 30', 38', 46', 80'	Report	Try: Howe 64' c Con: Pennell (1/1) 64'

Stade Alexandre-Cueille (Note: Game was originally scheduled to take place at Brive's home ground of Stade Amédée-Domenech at 15:00 local time. However the pitch was deemed unplayable and the match was rescheduled for a later kick off at the rearranged venue of Stade Alexandre-Cueille.)
Attendance: 800
Referee: Dan Jones (WRU)

== See also ==
- 2017–18 European Rugby Champions Cup
