= Gilberto Pavan =

Retier Rugby player

- Born: 13 October 1986 (age 40) Conegliano, Italy
- Height: 1.86 m (6 ft 1 in)
- Weight: 93 kg (205 lb; 14 st 9 lb)
- Notable relative: Riccardo Pavan (twin brother)

Rugby union career
- Position: Centre
- Current team: Viadana
Youth career
- Benetton Treviso
Senior career
Years	Team	Apps	(Points)
2008−2010	Crociati Parma	56	(15)
2010−2012	Aironi	37	(5)
2012−2021	Viadana	142	(45)
- Correct as of 12 June 2020
- Correct as of 12 June 2020
Coaching career
- Years: Team
- 2020–: I Caimani (assistant coach)

Gilberto Pavan (Conegliano, 13 October 1986) is an Italian rugby union player. His usual position was as a Centre and he played for Viadana in Top12, until 2020−2021 season.

In 2010-11 and 2011–12 Celtic League (Pro12) seasons, he played for Aironi.
