= Romain Frou =

- Born: 3 January 1984 (age 42) Nantes, France
- Height: 1.83 m (6 ft 0 in)
- Weight: 114 kg (17 st 13 lb)

Rugby union career
- Position: Prop
Senior career
Years	Team	Apps	(Points)
2005-2008	Montpellier	3	(0)
2008-2011	La Rochelle	50	(10)
2011-2012	Toulon	8	(5)
2012-	Stade Français	22	(10)
- Correct as of 24 January 2015

Romain Frou (born 3 January 1984 in Nantes, France) is a French rugby union player. He plays at prop for Stade Français in the Top 14.
