= Daniel Ramsay =

NZ rugby union player

- Born: Daniel Ramsay; 1 June 1984 (age 42) Invercargill, New Zealand
- Height: 1.97 m (6 ft 6 in)
- Weight: 113 kg (17 st 11 lb)

Rugby union career
- Position: Lock
- Current team: Pau
Provincial / State sides
Years	Team	Apps	(Points)
2006–08	Southland	22	(10)
2009–10	Wellington	19	(25)
2011–12	Otago	9	(0)
2012–	Pau	174	(95)
International career
Years	Team	Apps	(Points)
2010	New Zealand Māori		

Daniel Ramsay (born 1 June 1984) is a New Zealand rugby union footballer who plays as a lock for Section Paloise in the Top 14.

== Rugby career ==
Ramsay made his debut for Southland in their final game of the 2006 Air New Zealand Cup. Over the following two seasons, he developed into a regular squad member, and he scored his first two provincial tries during the 2008 Air New Zealand Cup.

For the 2009 Air New Zealand Cup, Ramsay signed with Wellington. With the Lions, he had his finest provincial season, making 15 appearances and 14 starts, and scored four tries. He started a further four games in the 2010 ITM Cup before being sidelined for the remainder of the season following shoulder surgery.

Of Ngāi Tahu descent, Ramsay played for New Zealand Māori in 2010.

Ramsay moved back south for the 2011 ITM Cup, signing with Otago. He is currently playing as lock for French Top 14 club Section Paloise in Pau, France.
