= Jacques Boussuge =

French rugby union and rugby sevens player

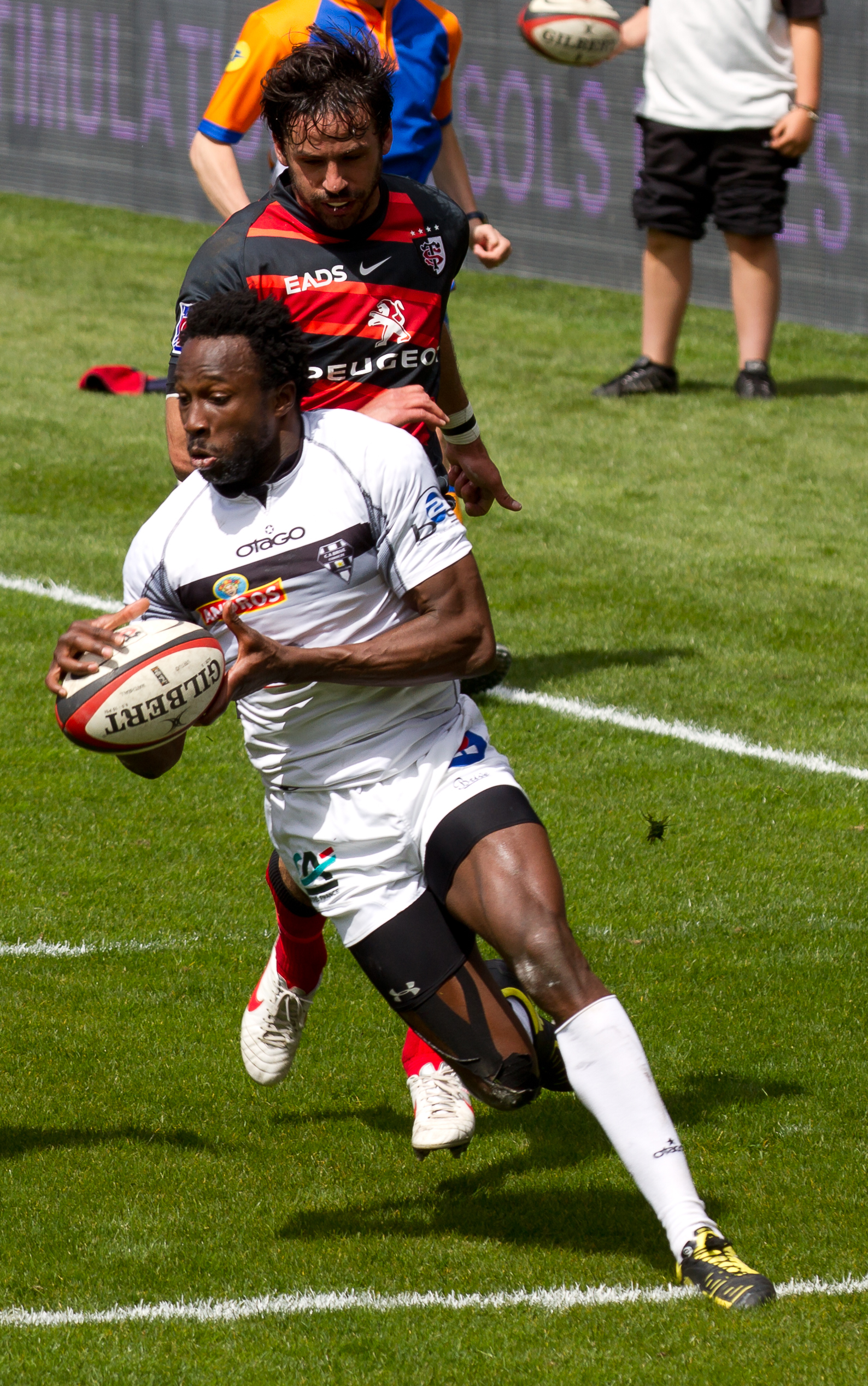
Jacques Boussuge just before scoring a try against Stade toulousain

Jacques Boussuge (born 15 May 1985) is a French rugby union and rugby sevens player. He is 1.87m tall and 87 kg.

He currently plays for Biarritz Olympique in the Rugby Pro D2. He previously played for CA Brive, Montpellier Herault RC and Bath Rugby. He has also played for the France Sevens team.

He graduated with an MBA from HEC Paris.
