= Clément Otazo =

- Born: Clément Otazo; 3 May 1992 (age 34)
- Height: 1.80 m (5 ft 11 in)
- Weight: 81 kg (12 st 11 lb)

Rugby union career
- Position: Fly-half
Senior career
Years	Team	Apps	(Points)
2011-2015	Bayonne	20	(31)
2015-2019	Stade Montois	64	(20)
2019-	Saint-Jean-de-Luz	4	(21)
- Correct as of October 18, 2019
International career
Years	Team	Apps	(Points)
2012	France U20	3	(14)

Clément Otazo (born 3 May 1992) is a French professional rugby union player. He plays at fly-half for Saint-Jean-de-Luz Olympique rugby in the Fédérale 1 .
