= Geoffrey Palis =

French rugby union player

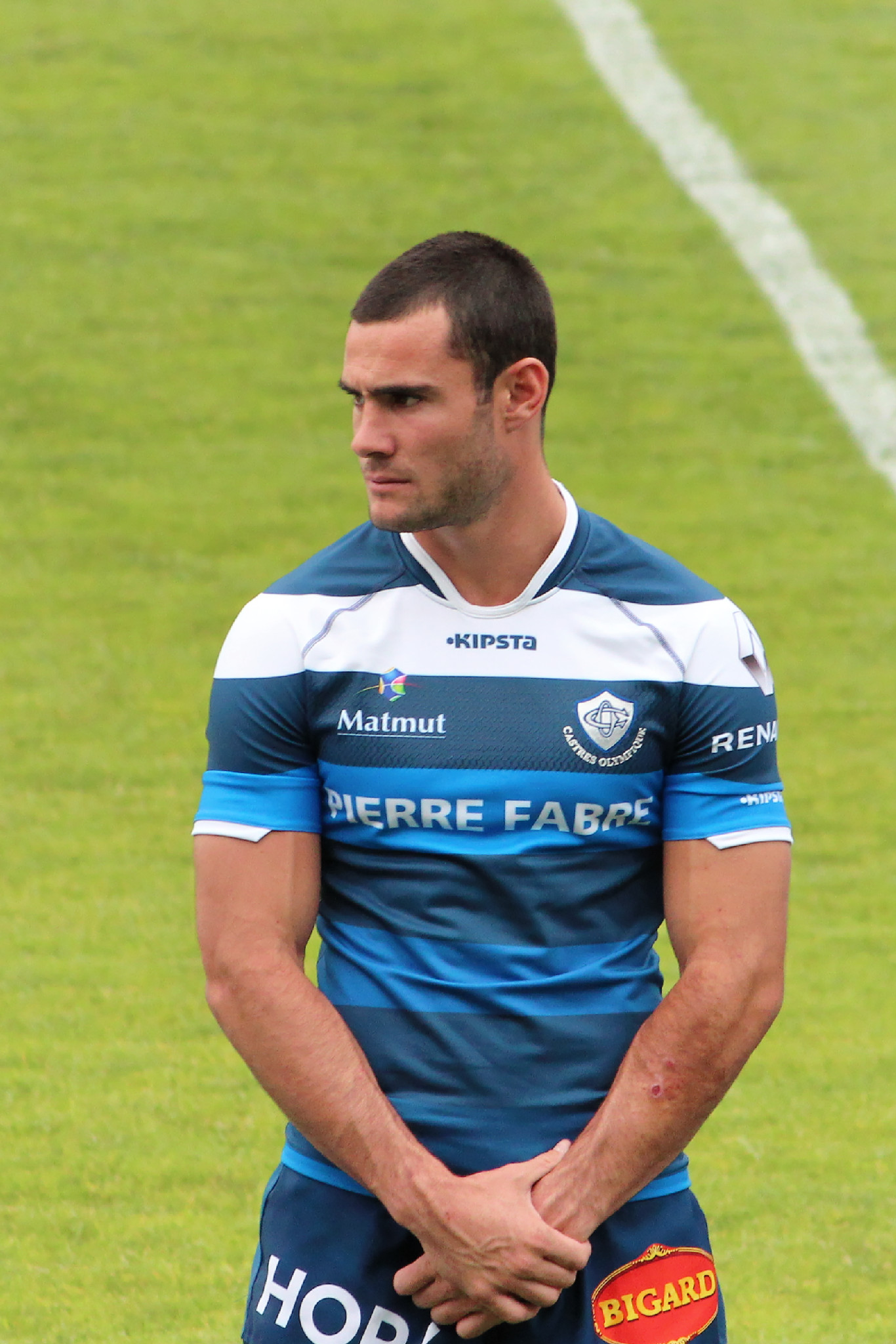
- Geoffrey Palis at the Olympique Castres during presentation for the 2015-2016 season
- Born: Geoffrey Palis; 8 July 1991 (age 35) Albi, France
- Height: 1.89 m (6 ft 2 1/2 in)
- Weight: 87 kg (13 st 10 lb)

Rugby union career
- Position: Fullback
- Current team: Castres
Amateur team(s)
Years	Team	Apps	(Points)
–	UA Gaillacoise		
Senior career
Years	Team	Apps	(Points)
2009–2013	Albi	81	(137)
2013–	Castres	196	(446)
- Correct as of 11 October 2023
International career
Years	Team	Apps	(Points)
2011	France U20	9	(25)
2018–	France	2	(0)
- Correct as of 11 February 2018

Geoffrey Palis (born 8 July 1991) is a French rugby union player. His usual position is as a fullback, and he currently plays for Castres Olympique in the Top 14 and the France national team.

== International career ==
In January 2014, Palis was named in the France national team for the 2014 Six Nations Championship. Palis was called up to the France national team again ahead of France's opening 2018 Six Nations Championship match against Ireland. He started in that game and played the full 80 minutes in an eventual 13–15 home loss.
