= Yvan Reilhac =

French rugby union player

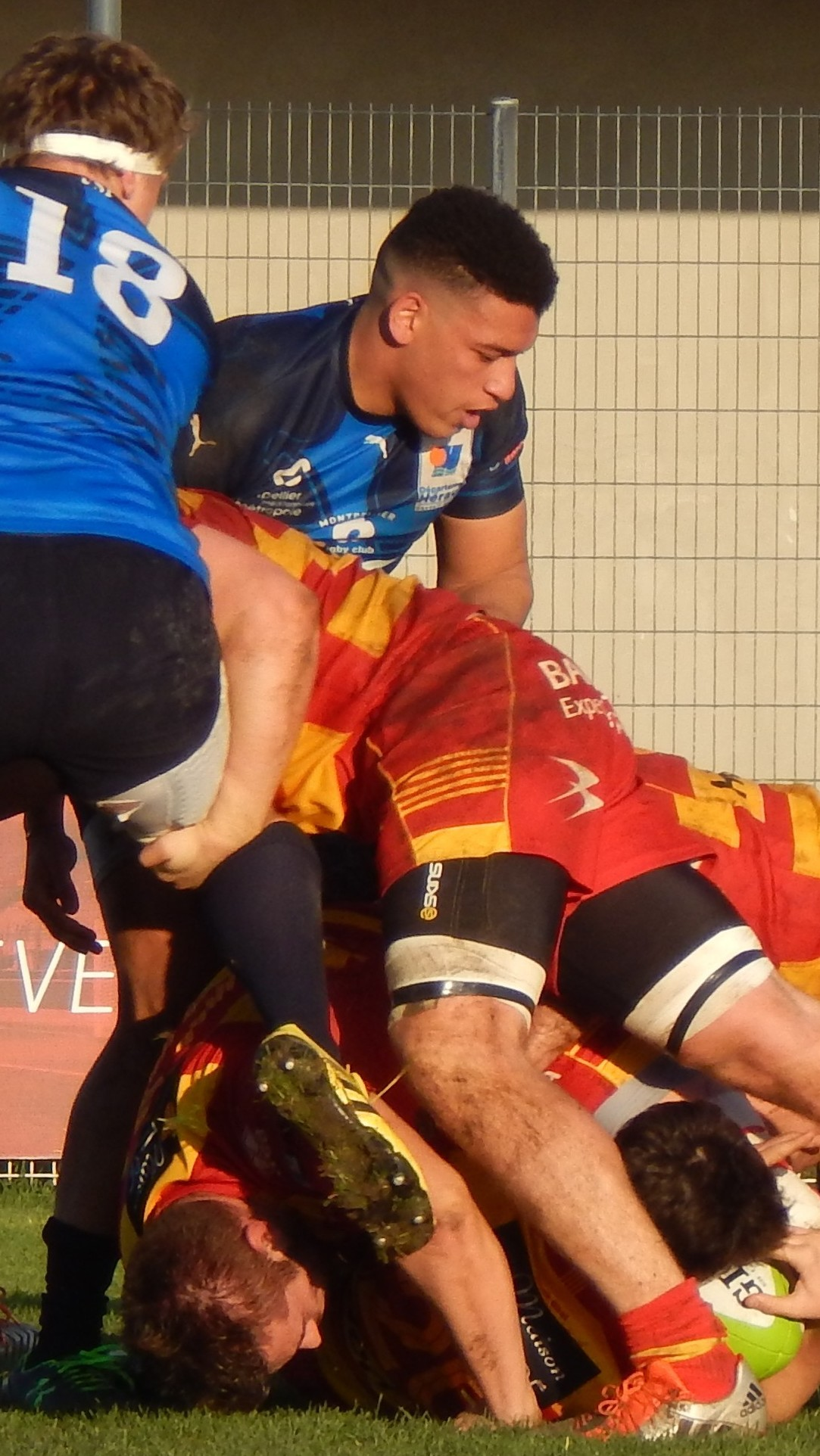
- Born: 9 June 1995 (age 31) Paris, France
- Height: 1.82 m (6 ft 0 in)
- Weight: 92 kg (14 st 7 lb; 203 lb)

Rugby union career
- Position: Centre
- Current team: Montauban
Youth career
- 2009–2015: Montpellier
Senior career
Years	Team	Apps	(Points)
2016–2024	Montpellier	53	(70)
2024 - 2025	Montauban		
- Correct as of 15 October 2017

Yvan Reilhac (born 9 June 1995) is a French rugby union player. His position is centre and he currently plays for Montauban in the Top 14. He can also play as a winger.

== Career ==
Reilhac made his debut for the senior team on 20 November 2015 in their European Rugby Challenge Cup match against Rugby Calvisano, replacing Anthony Tuitavake for the second half of the match.
