= Louis Acosta =

Filipino lawyer and jurist

The Honorable Louis P. Acosta
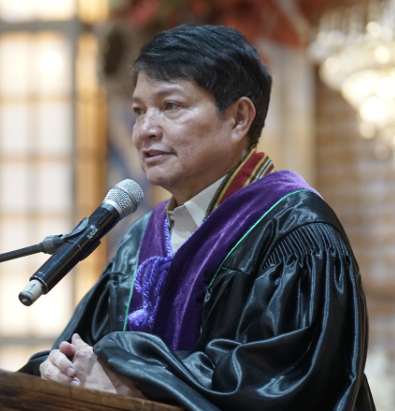

Associate Justice of the Court of Appeals of the Philippines
- Incumbent
- Assumed office March 2, 2017
- Preceded by: Agnes Reyes-Carpio

Personal details
- Born: June 21, 1961 (age 65) Philippines
- Education: San Beda College (AB Economics, minor in Mathematics); University of the Philippines / University of Manila (LLB)
- Profession: Lawyer, judge

Louis Paredes Acosta (born June 21, 1961) is a Filipino lawyer and jurist who currently serves as an Associate Justice of the Court of Appeals of the Philippines. He was appointed to the appellate court on March 2, 2017, by President Rodrigo Duterte.

== Early life and education ==
Louis Acosta was born on June 21, 1961, the ninth child of Judge Eficio B. Acosta of the Court of First Instance of Pasig City, and Porfiria Paredes Acosta, a school teacher. He is also the younger brother of retired Court of Appeals Associate Justice Francisco “Nick” Acosta.

He finished his elementary and secondary education at St. Louis School in Solano, Nueva Vizcaya. Acosta earned his Bachelor of Arts in economics, with a minor in Mathematics, from San Beda College. He later obtained his Bachelor of Laws degree from the University of the Philippines and the University of Manila.

== Career ==
After eleven years of private law practice, Acosta joined the judiciary in 2004 when he was appointed Presiding Judge of the Regional Trial Court (RTC) Branch 32 in Surigao del Norte.

He was later transferred to Branch 70 of the Taguig City RTC, where he served until 2015, concluding eleven years of service as a trial court judge. An active member of the Philippine Judges Association, Acosta served as one of its officers from 2007 until his appointment to the Court of Appeals.

On March 2, 2017, President Rodrigo Duterte appointed Acosta as Associate Justice of the Court of Appeals, where he was assigned to the Cagayan de Oro station.

== Sources ==
This article incorporates text from a free content work. Licensed under public domain as a work of the Philippine government. Text taken from PHILJA In Pursuit of Judicial Excellence, 14, Government of the Republic of the Philippines, Philippine Judicial Academy.
