= Steve McColl =

Scottish rugby union player

- Born: Steve McColl; 16 August 1988 (age 38) Fife, Scotland
- Height: 1.83 m (6 ft 0 in)
- Weight: 98 kg (216 lb)

Rugby union career
- Position: Fullback
Amateur team(s)
Years	Team	Apps	(Points)
- Edinburgh
Senior career
Years	Team	Apps	(Points)
2007–2011	Doncaster Knights	27	(85)
2011–2014	Yorkshire Carnegie	54	(110)
2014–2016	Gloucester Rugby	16	(25)
2016–	Yorkshire Carnegie	0	(0)
International career
Years	Team	Apps	(Points)
2007–2008	Scotland U20	4	(28)

Steve McColl (born 16 August 1988) is a Scottish professional rugby union player who currently plays for Yorkshire Carnegie in the RFU Championship. He started playing as a centre but switched to being a fullback.

McColl originally was part of Edinburgh Rugby as an academy player where he had represented Scotland at under-20 level, making four appearances in the 2008 Six Nations.

He left Scotland to join Doncaster Knights in the English RFU Championship. Whilst at Doncaster he finished the 2010–11 season with 13 tries in all competitions in 27 appearances having made the switch from centre to full-back. On 14 June 2011, McColl left Doncaster Knights to join Yorkshire Carnegie on a two-year contract.

He was one of the best performers for Yorkshire Carnegie during his first season at the club during the 2011–12 season, although he was ruled out for three months after undergoing surgery on his shoulder, and only made just 13 first-team appearances. His second season he was in equally impressive form, with only injuries preventing him from being an ever-present. He made his presence known whenever on the field and was a great addition to the team. At the end of the season he earned reward for his performances being named Players’ Player of the Season for the 2012–13 season, earning a place in the RFU Championship 'Dream Team' and signing a new contract with the club.

On 27 March 2014, McColl makes his move to the Aviva Premiership as he signed for Gloucester Rugby from the 2014–15 season. On 4 April 2016, McColl moves back up north to rejoin Yorkshire Carnegie in the RFU Championship.
