= Jordi Pasqualin =

English rugby union footballer

- Born: 28 March 1990 (age 36) Sheffield, England
- Height: 1.83 m (6 ft 0 in)
- Weight: 85 kg (13 st 5 lb)

Rugby union career
- Position: Scrum half
Senior career
Years	Team	Apps	(Points)
2008-2011	Gloucester	27	(0)
2011-2013	Newcastle Falcons	35	(15)
2013-2014	London Scottish	20	(10)
International career
Years	Team	Apps	(Points)
- England U-20

Jordi Pasqualin (born 28 March 1990 in Sheffield) is a rugby union footballer. Most recently played for London Scottish in the RFU Championship 2013–2014 after signing from Newcastle Falcons 2011–2013. Previously with Gloucester 2008–2011, having come through their academy where he made his Premiership debut at age 18. He plays as a scrum half.

== Club career ==
Pasqualin was educated at the King's School, Gloucester, and trained at Gloucester Rugby Academy.

He made his senior Premiership debut as a replacement for Gloucester against Bristol in November 2008 and has been capped by England at U18 and U20 level. He played for Moseley in the Championship whilst on dual registration where he helped Moseley beat Leeds to win the EDF Energy National Trophy at Twickenham in 2009, and Hartpury College win the BUSA Championship at Twickenham the same year. Pasqualin was a key player in Gloucester's successful LV Cup winning team in 2011, playing 80 minutes in their 34–7 final victory over Newcastle Falcons, the team he then went on to join that summer.

Pasqualin was a member of the England U20 squad in the 2009 and 2010 Six Nations and also featured in the Gloucester first team squad as the season progressed.

Pasqualin joined Premiership club Newcastle Falcons from Gloucester in the summer of 2011 where he made a total of 35 appearances, including the European Challenge Cup rugby. In his first season, he established himself as first choice scrum half before injury and the arrival of two senior international scrum halves in his second season limited his opportunities.

He then joined London Scottish for the 2013–2014 season as their first choice scrum half with 20 appearances including 15 starts in the RFU Championship scoring two tries and helping London Scottish secure their highest RFU Championship league finish to date.
