= Riccardo Pavan =

- Born: 13 October 1986 (age 40) Conegliano, Italy
- Height: 6 ft 2 in (188 cm)
- Weight: 207 lb (94 kg)

Rugby union career
- Position: Three-quarter
International career
Years	Team	Apps	(Points)
2008	Italy	1	(0)

Riccardo Pavan (born 13 October 1986) is an Italian former international rugby union player.

A Benetton Treviso youth player, Pavan was primarily a winger and for much of his club career formed a three-quarter partnership with twin brother Gilberto, starting with a successful period at Parma which included two Coppa Italia titles.

Pavan toured South Africa with the national team in 2008 and made his debut off the bench in the one-off Test against the Springboks at Newlands, which remained his only Italy cap.

In the 2011–12 season, Pavan was a member of the Aironi side that competed in the European Pro12 competition.

== See also ==
- List of Italy national rugby union players
