= Kevin Barrett (rugby union, born 1980) =

English rugby union player

- Born: 6 July 1980 (age 46) Cuckfield, West Sussex, England
- Height: 1.75 m (5 ft 9 in)
- Weight: 80 kg (12 st 8 lb; 180 lb)

Rugby union career
- Position: Scrum-half
Senior career
Years	Team	Apps	(Points)
1999–2004	London Irish	20	(0)
2004–2009	Exeter Chiefs	94	(0)
2009–2011	Saracens	5	(0)
2011–2013	Exeter Chiefs	27	

Kevin Barrett (born 6 July 1980) and attended Stonyhurst College. He was a rugby union player for Exeter Chiefs in the Aviva Premiership. He plays as a scrum-half. On 22 March 2011, Barrett announced his resignation from the Exeter Chiefs for the 2011/2012 season. He was previously with fellow Aviva Premiership side Saracens.

On 3 May 2013, Barrett announced he will be retiring from rugby and will be rejoining former club Saracens as a member of the clubs strength and conditioning team.
