= Simon Alcott =

English rugby union footballer

- Born: 23 October 1983 (age 43) Cuckfield, West Sussex, England
- Height: 1.78 m (5 ft 10 in)
- Weight: 106 kg (16 st 10 lb)

Rugby union career
- Position: Hooker
- Current team: Exeter Chiefs
Senior career
Years	Team	Apps	(Points)
- Worthing
2008–2013	Exeter Chiefs	71	(50)

Simon Alcott is a retired rugby union player who finished his career at Exeter Chiefs. He made his debut for Exeter on 30 August 2008 against Esher. His position of choice is hooker.

Exeter Chiefs announced on 11 April 2013 that Alcott would be retiring from rugby with immediate effect due to a neck injury.
