= Djalil Narjissi =

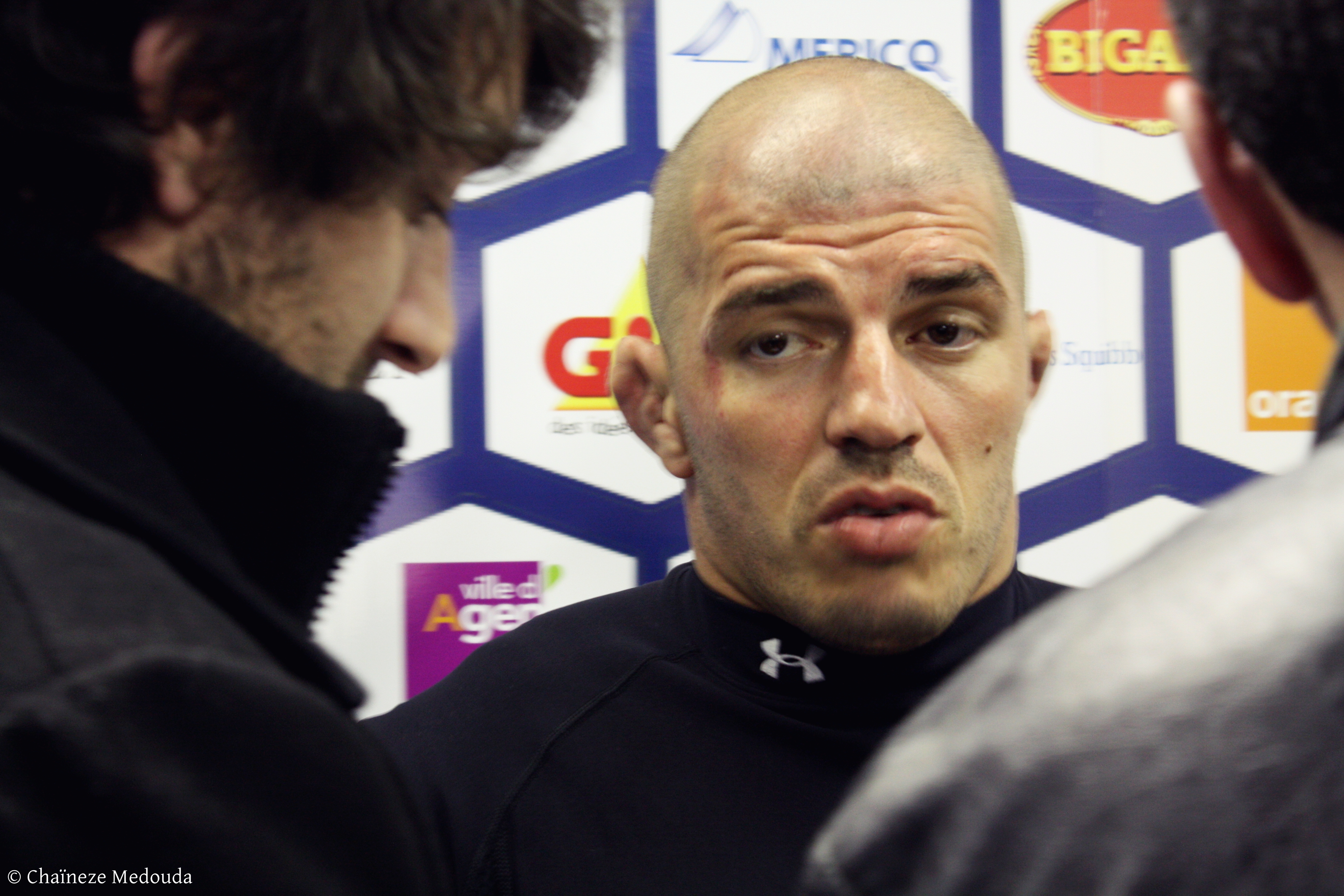
- Born: January 18, 1980 (age 46) Casablanca, Morocco
- Height: 1.78 m (5 ft 10 in)
- Weight: 95 kg (209 lb)

Rugby union career
- Position: Hooker
Senior career
Years	Team	Apps	(Points)
2001-2004	Castres Olympique	9	(0)
2004-	SU Agen Lot-et-Garonne	212	(80)
International career
Years	Team	Apps	(Points)
- Morocco

Djalil Narjissi (Arabic: جاليل نرجسي; born 18 January 1980) is a Moroccan rugby union footballer who currently plays in the Top 14, for Agen. He joined Agen in 2004, having previously played for Castres. Narjissi is also the captain of the Morocco national team.
