= Julien Dumora =

French professional rugby union player

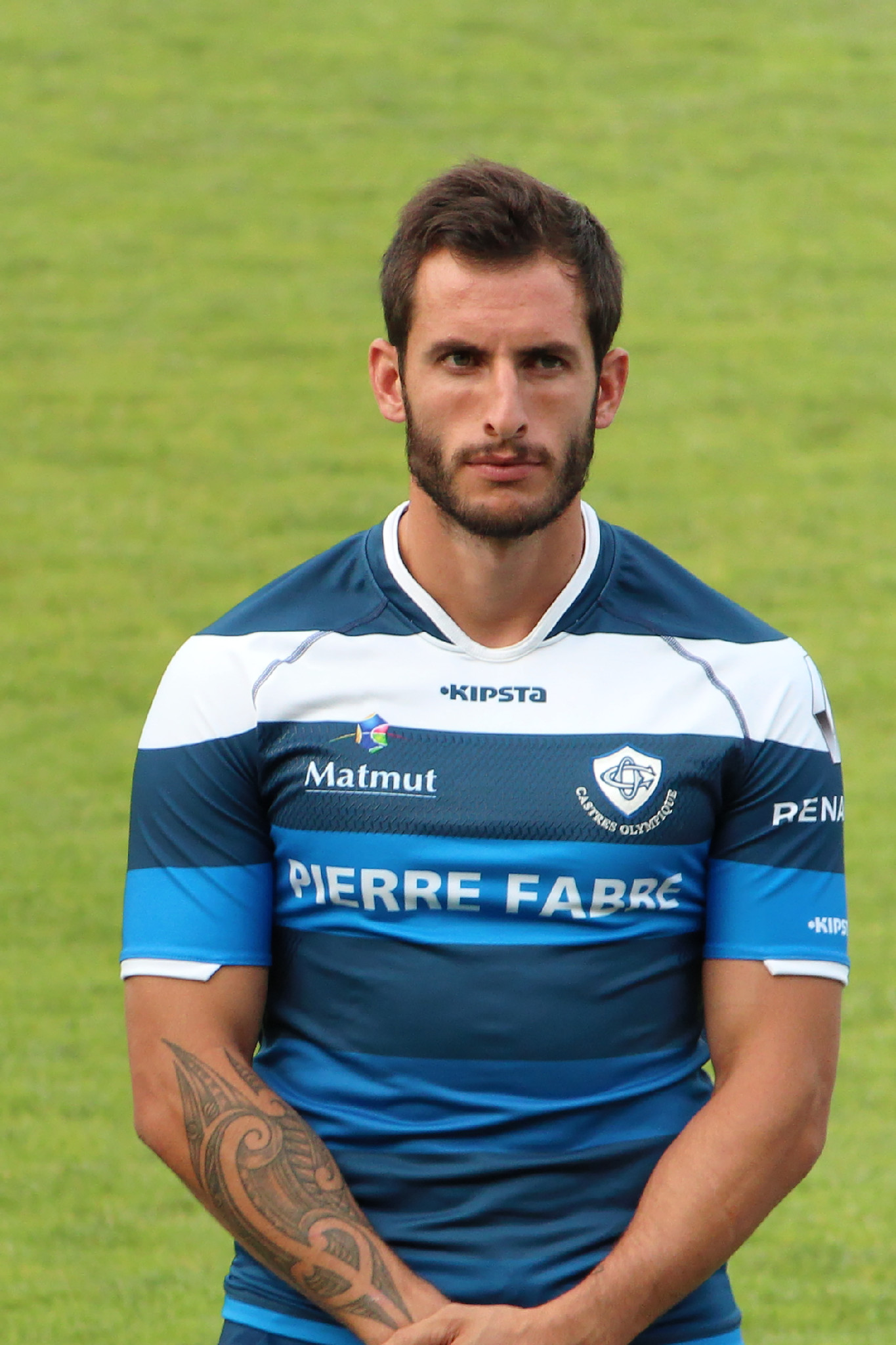
- Dumora in 2015
- Born: Julien Dumora; 24 March 1988 (age 38) Arudy, France
- Height: 1.84 m (6 ft 0 in)
- Weight: 90 kg (14 st 2 lb)

Rugby union career
- Position: Full back
Senior career
Years	Team	Apps	(Points)
2006–2011	Pau	95	(167)
2011–2012	Toulon	10	(78)
2012–2014	Lyon	53	(428)
2014–	Castres	273	(659)
- Correct as of 9 June 2025

Julien Dumora (born 23 March 1988 in Arudy, France) is a French professional rugby union player. He currently plays at full back for Castres in the Top 14.

In the final of the 2017–18 Top 14 season he scored a try as Castres defeated Montpellier.

== Honours ==
=== Club ===
(France) Castres

- Top 14: 2017–18
