= Charles Géli =

French Rugby Union player (born 1987)

Charles Géli (born 26 March 1987) is a French Rugby Union player. His position is Hooker and he currently plays for Montpellier. He won the 2008-09 Top 14 with USA Perpignan.

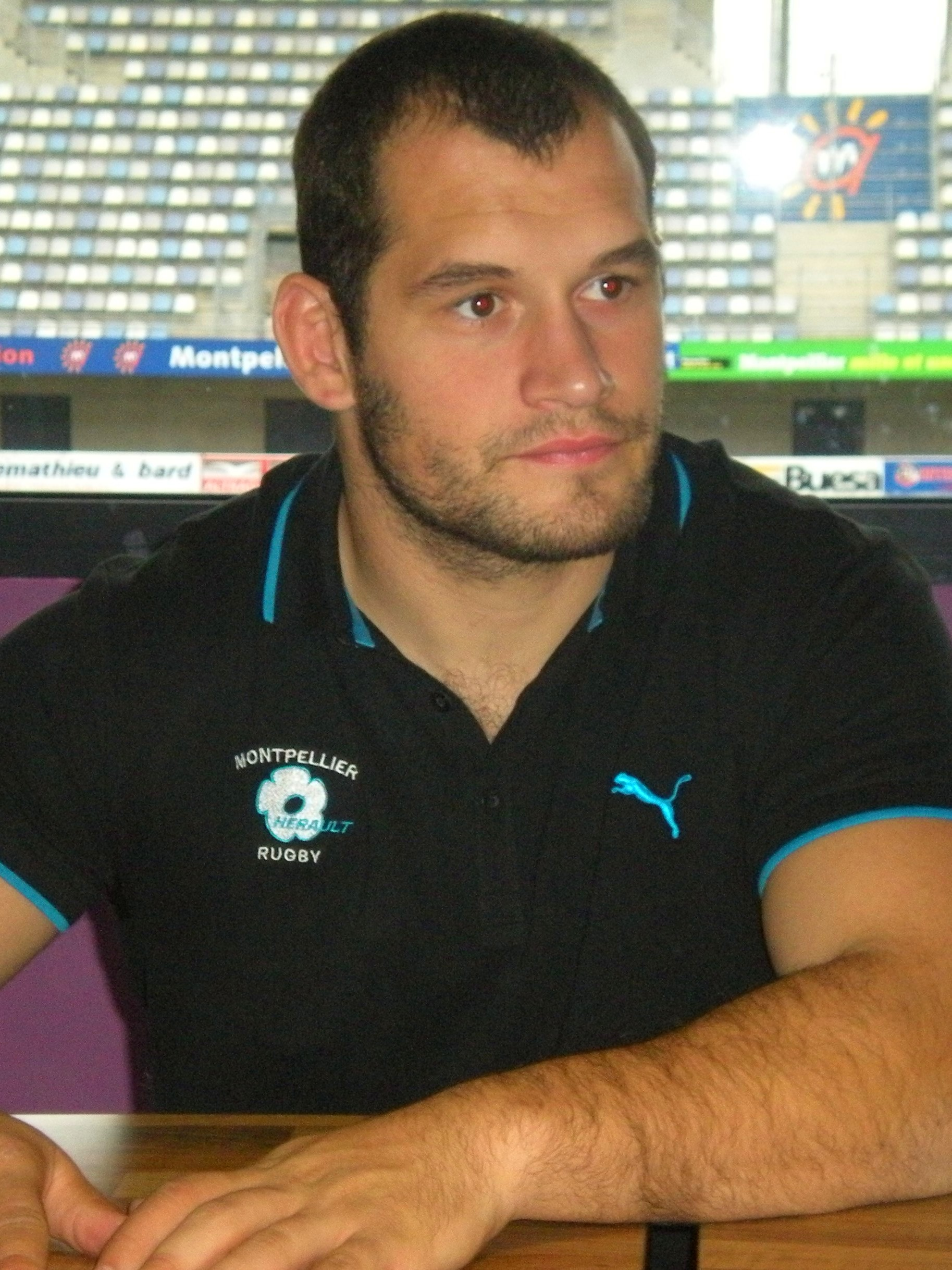
Charles Geli.
