= Julien Audy =

French rugby union player

- Born: 21 November 1984 (age 41) Tulle, France
- Height: 1.71 m (5 ft 7 1/2 in)
- Weight: 77 kg (12 st 2 lb)

Rugby union career
- Position: Scrum-half
Senior career
Years	Team	Apps	(Points)
2003–06	Toulouse	5	(5)
2006–10	Montauban	59	(110)
2010-12	Bayonne	40	(57)
2012-13	Oyonnax	30	(160)
2013-2016	La Rochelle	79	(162)
2016-17	Union Bordeaux Begles	8	(0)
2017-	Oyonnax	37	(41)
- Correct as of 11 December 2019

Julien Audy (born 21 November 1984) is a French rugby union player. His position is Scrum-half and he currently plays for US Oyonnax in the Rugby Pro D2.
