= List of 2014–15 RFU Championship transfers =

This is a list of player transfers involving RFU Championship teams before or during the 2014–15 season.

== Bedford Blues ==
=== Players In ===
- (England) Anthony Fenner from (Italy) Viadana
- (South Africa) Nick Fenton-Wells from (England) Saracens
- (England) Jim Wigglesworth from (England) Cambridge RUFC
- (England) Dean Adamson from (England) Ampthill
- (England) Billy Moss from (England) London Welsh
- (England) Harry Wells from (England) Leicester Tigers
- (England) Justin Blanchet from (England) Exeter Chiefs
- (England) Henry Staff from (England) Rosslyn Park
- (England) Camilo Parilli-Ocampo from (England) Ealing Trailfinders
- (England) James Currie from (England) Yorkshire Carnegie
- (England) Tom Williams from (England) Leicester Lions
- (Wales) Steffan Jones from (Wales) Newport Gwent Dragons (season-loan)
- (England) Daryl Dyer from (England) Ampthill
- (England) Josh Buggea from (England) Worcester Warriors
- (Ireland) Eoin Sheriff from (England) Saracens (season-loan)
- (Tonga) Viliamo Hakalo from (Tonga) Toa Saracens

=== Players Out ===
- (England) Mark Atkinson to (England) Gloucester Rugby
- (England) Sacha Harding retired
- (Ireland) Brendan Burke retired
- (England) Darren Fearn to (England) Sale Sharks
- (Ireland) Corey Hircock to (England) Cambridge RUFC
- (England) Ben Cooper to (England) London Welsh

== Bristol ==
=== Players In ===
- (Wales) Dwayne Peel from (England) Sale Sharks
- (Samoa) Anthony Perenise from (England) Bath Rugby
- (Samoa) David Lemi from (England) Worcester Warriors
- (Ireland) Jack O'Connell from (Ireland) Leinster
- (Ireland) Darren Hudson from (Ireland) Leinster
- (England) Max Crumpton from (England) Saracens
- (South Africa) Nick Köster from (England) Bath Rugby
- (Samoa) Jack Lam from (New Zealand) Hurricanes
- (England) Craig Hampson from (England) Yorkshire Carnegie
- (Wales) Matthew Morgan from (Wales) Ospreys
- (Wales) Ryan Jones from (Wales) Ospreys
- (Scotland) Ross Rennie from (Scotland) Edinburgh Rugby
- (England) Olly Robinson from (England) Moseley
- (England) Chris Brooker from (England) Worcester Warriors
- (Wales) Ian Evans from (Wales) Ospreys
- (Wales) Gareth Maule from (Wales) Scarlets
- (England) Josh Ovens from (England) Bath Rugby

=== Players Out ===
- (Scotland) George Watkins to (Wales) Cardiff Blues
- (Wales) James Merriman retired
- (New Zealand) Ruki Tipuna to (England) Newcastle Falcons
- (England) Steve Uren to (New Zealand) Tasman Makos
- (Samoa) Fautua Otto released
- (South Africa) Errie Claassens to (England) London Scottish
- (Scotland) Bruce Douglas to (Wales) Cardiff RFC
- (Argentina) Mariano Sambucetti retired
- (England) Will Davis to (England) Ealing Trailfinders
- (Wales) Adam Hughes to (England) Exeter Chiefs
- (Scotland) Stuart McInally to (Scotland) Edinburgh Rugby
- (England) Tristan Roberts to (England) London Welsh
- (England) Iain Grieve to (England) Plymouth Albion
- (England) Callum Braley to (England) Gloucester Rugby
- (England) Mark Lilley to (England) London Scottish (season-loan)
- (England) Ollie Hayes to (England) Yorkshire Carnegie
- (Fiji) Sammy Speight to (England) Coventry RFC
- (England) Jason Hobson retired
- (Scotland) Bryan Rennie to Hong Kong Scottish
- (England) Rupert Freestone to (England) Clifton RFC
- (Australia) Adam D'Arcy released
- (England) Redford Pennycook released
- (England) James Grindal retired
- (Wales) Ross Johnson retired

== Cornish Pirates ==
=== Players In ===
- (England) Adam Jameson from (England) Bath Rugby
- (England) Ben Trevaskis from (England) Penryn
- (England) Paul Andrew from (England) Worcester Warriors
- (England) Jamal Ford-Robinson from (England) Cambridge RUFC
- (England) George Collenette from (England) Guernsey
- (England) Dan Lee from (England) Taunton
- (England) Bertie Hopkins from (England) Guildford
- (England) Charlie Davey from (England) London Irish

=== Players Out ===
- (Scotland) Neale Patrick to (England) Plymouth Albion
- (England) Gary Johnson to (England) Ealing Trailfinders
- (England) Junior Fatialofa retired
- (England) Peter Joyce retired
- (Australia) Angus Sinclair released
- (England) Kyle Marriott to (England) Redruth
- (Ireland) Shane Cahill to (England) London Welsh
- (Ireland) James Sandford to (England) London Welsh
- (England) Max Maidment to (England) London Scottish
- (Scotland) Ben Prescott to (England) London Scottish
- (England) Jake Parker to (England) Chinnor

== Doncaster Knights ==
=== Players In ===
- (Scotland) Colin Quigley from (England) Rotherham Titans
- (Canada) Jon Phelan from (Canada) Atlantic Rock
- (Canada) Tyler Hotson from (England) London Scottish
- (England) Alex Shaw from (England) Nottingham
- (Tonga) Latu Makaafi from (England) Jersey
- (Scotland) Andrew Bulumakau from (England) Gloucester Rugby
- (Tonga) Tomasi Palu from (New Zealand) Wellington Lions

== Jersey ==
=== Players In ===
- (Australia) Ryan Hodson from (Australia) Melbourne Rebels
- (England) Derrick Herriott from (England) Northampton Saints
- (England) Sam Lockwood from (England) Yorkshire Carnegie
- (England) Ryan Glynn from (England) Northampton Saints
- (Wales) Lewis Robling from (Wales) Newport Gwent Dragons
- (England) Harry Williams from (England) Nottingham
- (England) Pierce Phillips from (England) Darlington Mowden Park
- (Australia) Tobias Hoskins from (Australia) Western Force
- (Tonga) Paula Kaho from (Sri Lanka) Havelock SC
- (England) Gareth Harris from (England) Loughborough Students RUFC
- (Australia) Nick Haining from (Australia) Western Force
- (New Zealand) Jonny Bentley from (England) Gloucester Rugby
- (England) Tommy Bell from (England) Wasps
- (Argentina) Ignacio Saenz Lancuba from (Argentina) San Cirano
- (Ireland) Michael Noone from (England) Leicester Tigers
- (Argentina) Martín García Veiga from (Argentina) Pampas XV
- (South Africa) Jason Thomas from (South Africa) Blue Bulls

=== Players Out ===
- (Scotland) Dave Young to (Wales) Newport Gwent Dragons
- (England) James Voss to (England) Hartpury College R.F.C.
- (England) Tom Fidler to (England) Plymouth Albion
- (Tonga) Elvis Taione to (England) Exeter Chiefs
- (Ireland) Seán McCarthy to (Ireland) Leinster
- (England) Tom Cooper retired
- (England) Luke Stratford to (England) Hartpury College R.F.C.
- (England) Rob Anderson released
- (Ireland) Niall O'Connor released
- (England) Fred Silcock to (England) London Scottish
- (Wales) Tom Brown to (England) Ealing Trailfinders
- (Tonga) Latu Makaafi to (England) Doncaster Knights
- (England) Jimmy Williams to (England) Plymouth Albion
- (England) James Copsey to (England) Ealing Trailfinders

== London Scottish ==
=== Players In ===
- (Ireland) Peter Lydon from (France) Stade Français Paris
- (Ireland) Stewart Maguire from (England) Esher
- (England) Matt Williams from (England) Moseley
- (England) Mark Lilley from (England) Bristol Rugby (season-loan)
- (South Africa) Errie Claassens from (England) Bristol Rugby
- (England) Fred Silcock from (England) Jersey
- (United States) Tai Tuisamoa from (England) London Welsh
- (England) Max Maidment from (England) Cornish Pirates
- (Scotland) Ben Prescott from (England) Cornish Pirates
- (Wales) Ben Calder from (England) Saracens
- (England) James Phillips from (England) Exeter Chiefs
- (New Zealand) Chris Walker from (Australia) Cottesloe

=== Players Out ===
- (England) Tedd Stagg to (England) Plymouth Albion
- (England) Lewis Thiede to (England) Rotherham Titans
- (England) Tomas Francis to (England) Exeter Chiefs
- (United States) Eric Fry to (England) Newcastle Falcons
- (England) Peter Homan to (England) Plymouth Albion
- (England) Mark Irish retired
- (Canada) Tyler Hotson from (England) Doncaster Knights

== Moseley ==
=== Players In ===
- (England) Ed Siggery from (England) Ealing Trailfinders
- (Wales) Simon Gardiner from (Wales) Swansea RFC
- (Australia) Scott Tolmie from (England) London Irish
- (England) Drew Cheshire from (England) Gloucester Rugby
- (England) Niles Dacres from (England) Stourbridge
- (England) Charley Thomas from (England) Moseley Oak RFC
- (England) Harry Hone from (England) Avonmouth Old Boys
- (England) Louis Roach from (England) Silhillians
- (England) Alex Foster from (England) Barking RFC

=== Players Out ===
- (Wales) Rhys Buckley to (Wales) Newport Gwent Dragons
- (England) Olly Robinson to (England) Bristol Rugby
- (England) Buster Lawrence to (England) Wasps

== Nottingham ==
=== Players In ===
- (England) Dan Mugford from (England) Plymouth Albion
- (Tonga) Viliame Iongi unattached
- (New Zealand) Paul Grant from (France) Montpellier
- (Ireland) Conor Carey from (England) Ealing Trailfinders
- (England) Elliott Cox from (England) London Irish
- (England) Cameron Lee-Everton from (England) Northampton Saints
- (England) Liam O'Neill from (England) Wasps
- (England) Billy Robinson from (England) Ealing Trailfinders
- (Scotland) Corey Venus from (England) Leicester Tigers
- (England) Toby Freeman from (England) Rotherham Titans

=== Players Out ===
- (England) David Jackson retired
- (England) Harry Williams to (England) Jersey
- (Wales) Matthew Jarvis to (England) Ealing Trailfinders
- (England) Alex Shaw to (England) Doncaster Knights

== Plymouth Albion ==
=== Players In ===
- (England) Ted Stagg from (England) London Scottish
- (Canada) Mark Kohler from (England) Coventry RFC
- (England) Cameron Setter unattached
- (England) Lawrence Rayner from (England) Old Albanian
- (Wales) Josh Davies from (Wales) Newport Gwent Dragons
- (England) Alistair Bone from (England) Loughborough Students RUFC
- (England) Tom Cowan-Dickie from (England) Exeter Chiefs
- (England) Tom Heard from (England) Gloucester Rugby
- (England) Tom Fidler from (England) Jersey
- (Scotland) Neale Patrick from (England) Cornish Pirates
- (England) Peter Horman from (England) London Scottish
- (Wales) Jake Henry from (Wales) Cardiff Metropolitan University RFC
- (England) Tom Jubb from (England) Saracens
- (England) Elliot Clements-Hill from (England) Ampthill
- (England) Luke Chapman from (England) Exeter Chiefs
- (Canada) Andrew Tiedemann from (Canada) Castaway Wanderers
- (England) Jimmy Williams from (England) Jersey
- (England) Iain Grieve from (England) Bristol Rugby
- (Australia) Marc Koteczky from (Australia) Randwick

=== Players Out ===
- (England) Heath Stevens to (England) Worcester Warriors
- (England) Dan Mugford to (England) Nottingham
- (Canada) Sean-Michael Stephen retired
- Tom Bowen to England Sevens
- (England) Chris Elder to (England) London Welsh
- (Ireland) Paul Rowley to (England) London Welsh
- (England) Ben Rogers released

== Rotherham Titans ==
=== Players In ===
- (England) Craig Dowsett from (England) Loughborough Students RUFC
- (England) Lewis Thiede from (England) London Scottish
- (Ireland) William Ryan from (Ireland) Cork Constitution
- (Ireland) Adam Macklin from (Ireland) Ulster
- (Ireland) James McKinney from (Ireland) Ulster
- (South Africa) Zylon McGaffin from (England) Darlington Mowden Park
- (England) Tom Holmes from (England) Sale Sharks
- (England) Perry Parker from (Scotland) Edinburgh Rugby
- (England) Scott Freer from (England) Yorkshire Carnegie
- (England) Greg Lound from (England) Hull RUFC

=== Players Out ===
- (England) Charlie Mulchrone to (England) Worcester Warriors
- (England) Ben Sowrey to (England) Worcester Warriors
- (England) Dan Sanderson to (England) Worcester Warriors
- (Argentina) Juan Pablo Socino to (England) Newcastle Falcons
- (England) Laurence Pearce to (England) Leicester Tigers
- (Scotland) Colin Quigley to (England) Doncaster Knights
- (England) Toby Freeman to (England) Nottingham
- (Wales) Jack Roberts to (England) Leicester Tigers

== Worcester Warriors ==
=== Players In ===
- (Wales) Andries Pretorius from (Wales) Cardiff Blues
- (England) Matt Cox from (England) Gloucester Rugby
- (England) Ryan Mills from (England) Gloucester Rugby
- (South Africa) Gerrit-Jan van Velze from (England) Northampton Saints
- (England) Charlie Mulchrone from (England) Rotherham Titans
- (Wales) Joe Rees from (Wales) Ospreys
- (England) Heath Stevens from (England) Plymouth Albion
- (England) Sam Smith from (England) Harlequins
- (Ireland) Niall Annett from (Ireland) Ulster
- (England) Dan Sanderson from (England) Rotherham Titans
- (England) Ben Sowrey from (England) Rotherham Titans
- (South Africa) Nick Schonert from (South Africa) Free State Cheetahs
- (England) Tom Biggs from (England) Bath Rugby
- (Wales) Dan George from (England) Gloucester Rugby
- (England) Ryan Bower from (England) Leicester Tigers
- (Ireland) Darren O'Shea from (Ireland) Munster
- (Wales) Jean-Baptiste Bruzulier from (France) Aix-en-Provence
- (Georgia (country)) Val Rapava-Ruskin unattached
- (Romania) Alex Gordaș from (Romania) CSM Olimpia Bucuresti
- (England) Mat Gilbert from (England) Bath Rugby

=== Players Out ===
- (Fiji) Josh Matavesi to (Wales) Ospreys
- (Samoa) David Lemi to (England) Bristol Rugby
- (Argentina) Mariano Galarza to (England) Gloucester Rugby
- (England) Danny Gray retired
- (England) Chris Brooker to (England) Bristol Rugby
- (Wales) Ed Shervington to (England) Wasps
- (England) Paul Hodgson retired
- (Ireland) John Andress to (Scotland) Edinburgh Rugby
- (England) Chris Jones to (England) Yorkshire Carnegie
- (England) Paul Andrew to (England) Cornish Pirates
- (Scotland) Euan Murray to (Scotland) Glasgow Warriors
- (England) Dean Schofield to (England) London Welsh
- (France) Jérémy Bécasseau to (France) USA Perpignan
- (New Zealand) Nick Seymour to (France) Rouen
- (Samoa) Jeremy Su'a to (Italy) Petrarca
- (England) Jon Clarke to (England) Yorkshire Carnegie
- (Australia) Paul Warwick retired
- (Tonga) Semisi Taulava to (France) Rouen
- (England) Jake Abbott to (United States) Griffins
- (New Zealand) Cameron Goodhue to (New Zealand) Northland

== Yorkshire Carnegie ==
=== Players In ===
- (England) Chris Pilgrim from (England) Newcastle Falcons
- (England) James Fitzpatrick from (England) Newcastle Falcons
- (England) Charlie Beech from (England) Bath Rugby
- (Scotland) Harry Leonard from (Scotland) Edinburgh Rugby
- (England) Chris Jones from (England) Worcester Warriors
- (Ireland) David McIlwaine from (Ireland) Ulster
- (England) Ollie Hayes from (England) Bristol Rugby
- (England) James Tideswell from (England) London Welsh
- (England) Jon Clarke from (England) Worcester Warriors

=== Players Out ===
- (England) Craig Hampson to (England) Bristol Rugby
- (Scotland) Steve McColl to (England) Gloucester Rugby
- (England) Calum Green to (England) Newcastle Falcons
- (England) Sam Lockwood to (England) Jersey
- (England) James Currie to (England) Bedford Blues
- (England) Alex Lozowski to (England) Wasps
- (England) Jacob Rowan to (England) Gloucester Rugby
- (Germany) Damien Tussac to (France) US Montauban
- (England) Scott Freer to (England) Rotherham Titans
- (England) Josh Griffin to (England) Salford Red Devils

== See also ==
- List of 2014–15 Premiership Rugby transfers
- List of 2014–15 Pro12 transfers
- List of 2014–15 Top 14 transfers
- List of 2014–15 Super Rugby transfers
