= 2014–15 RFU Championship =

- Countries: England; Jersey
- Date: 5 September 2014 – 27 May 2015
- Champions: Worcester Warriors
- Runners-up: Bristol
- Relegated: Plymouth Albion
- Matches played: 138
- Attendance: 377,794 (average 2,738 per match)
- Highest attendance: 12,024 Worcester Warriors at home to Bristol on 27 May 2015
- Lowest attendance: 631 Moseley at home to London Scottish on 8 November 2014
- Top point scorer: (Scotland) Dougie Flockhart (Doncaster Knights) 229 points
- Top try scorer: (New Zealand) Mark Bright (London Scottish) 26 tries

The 2014–15 RFU Championship, known for sponsorship reasons as the Greene King IPA Championship, is the sixth season of the professionalised format of the RFU Championship, the second tier of the English rugby union league system run by the Rugby Football Union. It is contested by eleven English clubs and one from Jersey in the Channel Islands. This is the second year of the competition's sponsorship with Greene King Brewery, which runs until 2017. The twelve teams in the RFU Championship also competed in the British and Irish Cup, along with clubs from Ireland and Wales. Matches in the RFU Championship were broadcast on Sky Sports.

Worcester Warriors finished second during the regular season and became champions after beating Bristol 59 – 58 in the two-legged final. The Warriors overcame third-place London Scottish in the semifinal play-off, while Bristol (who finished first in the league table) beat fourth-place Rotherham Titans in the other semi-final. After thirteen seasons in the second tier of English rugby union, Plymouth Albion are relegated to the 2015–16 National League 1 for next season, after finishing in last place.

== Structure ==
The Championship's structure has all the teams playing each other on a home and away basis. The play–off structure will remain the same as the previous year. The top four teams at the end of the home–and–away season qualify for the promotion play–offs which follow a 1 v 4, 2 v 3 system. The winners have to meet the RFU's Minimum Standards Criteria in order to be promoted to the Premiership. If they fail to meet the criteria then there is no promotion. There are no relegation play–offs; the bottom team is automatically relegated. Following an agreement with the RFU in 2012, each RFU Championship club will receive £365,000 in funding from the RFU for the season.

== Participating teams and locations ==
Ten of the teams that competed in the 2013–14 RFU Championship remain in the competition for the 2014–15 RFU Championship. London Welsh were promoted back into the English Premiership after defeating Bristol in the play-off final after being relegated into the RFU Championship the previous year. They are replaced by Worcester Warriors after they were relegated to the RFU Championship after finishing last in the 2013–14 English Premiership. Ealing Trailfinders were relegated into National League 1 after finishing bottom of the 2013–14 RFU Championship by one point. They are replaced by Doncaster Knights, who returned to the RFU Championship at the first opportunity by finishing top of the 2013–14 National League 1 after being relegated in 2013. This was the first time that a relegated team returned to the RFU Championship after being relegated the previous season since the RFU Championship was formed.

Below is a list of the teams participating in the 2014–15 RFU Championship.

Locations of the 2014–15 RFU Championship teams

Club	Stadium	Capacity	Area	Captain	DOR/Head Coach
Bedford Blues	Goldington Road	5,000 (1,700 seats)	Bedford, Bedfordshire	(South Africa) Nick Fenton-Wells	(England) Mike Rayner
Bristol	Ashton Gate Stadium	21,497	Bristol	(Wales) Dwayne Peel	(England) Andy Robinson
Cornish Pirates	Mennaye Field	4,000 (2,200 Seats)	Penzance, Cornwall	(England) Chris Morgan	(Wales) Ian Davies
Doncaster Knights	Castle Park rugby stadium	5,000	Doncaster, South Yorkshire	(England) Michael Hills	(Wales) Clive Griffiths
Jersey	St. Peter	5,000	Saint Peter, Jersey	(England) Alex Rae	(South Africa) Harvey Biljon
London Scottish	Athletic Ground, Richmond	4,500 (1,000 seats)	Richmond, London	(England) Mark Bright	(England) Mike Friday
Moseley	Billesley Common	3,000+	Birmingham, West Midlands	(Wales) Mike Powell	(Ireland) Kevin Maggs
Nottingham Rugby	Meadow Lane; Lady Bay Sports Ground	19,588; 2,000 (est)	Nottingham, Nottinghamshire	(New Zealand) Brent Wilson	(England) Martin Haag
Plymouth Albion	The Brickfields	8,500	Plymouth, Devon	(England) Iain Grieve	(England) Graham Dawe
Rotherham Titans	Clifton Lane; Abbeydale Park (Note: Rotherham would have to play their final league game and any play-off games at Abbeydale Park in Sheffield due to a dispute with Rotherham Cricket Club over ground sharing at Clifton Lane.)	2,500; 3,300 (100 seats)	Rotherham, South Yorkshire; Sheffield, South Yorkshire	(England) Tom Holmes	(England) Lee Blackett
Worcester Warriors	Sixways Stadium	12,024	Worcester, Worcestershire	(South Africa) GJ van Velze	(England) Dean Ryan
Yorkshire Carnegie	Headingley Carnegie Stadium	21,062	Leeds, West Yorkshire	(England) Ryan Burrows	(Scotland) Ian McGeechan

== League table ==
2014–15 RFU Championship Table
Pos	Team	Pld	W	D	L	PF	PA	PD	TB	LB	Pts	Qualification
1	Bristol (F)	22	21	0	1	774	399	+375	18	1	103	Promotion play-off
2	Worcester Warriors (W)	22	19	0	3	858	335	+523	18	3	97	Promotion play-off
3	London Scottish (SF)	22	12	2	8	534	498	+36	10	2	64	Promotion play-off
4	Rotherham Titans (SF)	22	13	1	8	505	488	+17	5	2	61	Promotion play-off
5	Nottingham	22	12	0	10	461	578	−117	5	3	56	
6	Yorkshire Carnegie	22	10	1	11	494	462	+32	7	5	54	
7	Jersey	22	8	2	12	495	621	−126	5	7	48	
8	Cornish Pirates	22	9	0	13	436	464	−28	4	5	45	
9	Doncaster Knights	22	8	1	13	429	481	−52	3	6	43	
10	Bedford Blues	22	7	0	15	433	604	−171	6	4	38	
11	Moseley	22	5	1	16	441	637	−196	4	5	31	
12	Plymouth Albion (R)	22	3	2	17	314	630	−316	1	5	22	Relegation

Updated to match(es) played on 5 July 2015. Source: "Greene King IPA Championship". NCA Rugby.
Rules for classification: If teams are level at any stage, tiebreakers are applied in the following order:
1. Number of matches won
2. Difference between points for and against
3. Total number of points for
4. Aggregate number of points scored in matches between tied teams
5. Number of matches won excluding the first match, then the second and so on until the tie is settled

== Fixtures ==
=== Round 1 ===
6 September 2014
14:30

Doncaster Knights	27–6	Plymouth Albion
	Doncaster; Plymouth

Castle Park
Attendance: 1,303
Referee: Steve Lee

6 September 2014
15:00

(BP) London Scottish	32–23	Rotherham Titans
	Scottish; Rotherham

Athletic Ground
Attendance: 1,087
Referee: Greg MacDonald

6 September 2014
15:00

Moseley	22–22	Jersey
	Moseley; Jersey

Billesley
Attendance: 976
Referee: Thomas Foley

6 September 2014
15:00

Nottingham Rugby	19–10	Bedford Blues
	Nottingham; Bedford

Meadow Lane
Attendance: 1,239
Referee: John Meredith

7 September 2014
14:40

Bristol Rugby	23–19	Worcester Warriors (BP)
	Bristol; Worcester

Ashton Gate
Attendance: 8,549
Referee: Matt Carley

7 September 2014
15:00

Cornish Pirates	18–29	Yorkshire Carnegie (BP)
	Pirates; Carnegie

Mennaye Field
Attendance: 1,324
Referee: Simon Harding

=== Round 2 ===
13 September 2014
14:00

Bedford Blues	15–42	Rotherham Titans (BP)
	Bedford; Rotherham

Goldington Road
Attendance: 2,117
Referee: Steve Lee

13 September 2014
15:00

(BP) Jersey	17–23	Doncaster Knights
	Jersey; Doncaster

St Peter
Attendance: 1,914
Referee: Darren Gamage

13 September 2014
15:00

(BP) Plymouth Albion	17–24	Nottingham Rugby (BP)
	report

The Brickfields
Attendance: 1,232
Referee: Dean Richards

13 September 2014
15:00

Worcester Warriors	23–7	Moseley
	Worcester; Moseley

Sixways Stadium
Attendance: 4,376
Referee: Tim Wigglesworth

14 September 2014
14:30

Yorkshire Carnegie	13–26	Bristol Rugby
	report

Headingley Stadium
Attendance: 2,022
Referee: Greg MacDonald

14 September 2014
15:00

Cornish Pirates	19–30	London Scottish (BP)
	report

Mennaye Field
Attendance: 1,209
Referee: Tom Foley

=== Round 3 ===
19 September 2014
19:30

(BP) Moseley	28–32	Yorkshire Carnegie
	Moseley

Billesley Common
Attendance: 794
Referee: Simon Harding

20 September 2014
14:30

Doncaster Knights	16–32	Worcester Warriors (BP)
	Doncaster

Castle Park
Attendance: 1,426
Referee: Tom Foley

20 September 2014
15:00

(BP) London Scottish	36–30	Bedford Blues (2BP)
	Bedford

Athletic Ground
Attendance: 1,379
Referee: Dean Richards

20 September 2014
15:00

Rotherham Titans	30–25	Plymouth Albion (BP)
	Rotherham

Clifton Lane
Attendance: 1,100
Referee: Tim Wigglesworth

21 September 2014
15:00

(BP) Bristol Rugby	45–17	Cornish Pirates

Ashton Gate
Attendance: 6,785
Referee: Darren Gamage

21 September 2014
15:45

Nottingham Rugby	12–39	Jersey (BP)
	Jersey

Meadow Lane
Attendance: 1,389
Referee: Andrew Jackson

=== Round 4 ===
26 September 2014
19:45

(BP) Bristol Rugby	42–17	London Scottish
	report

Ashton Gate
Attendance: 7,454
Referee: John Meredith

27 September 2014
15:00

(BP) Jersey	29–32	Rotherham Titans (BP)
	Jersey; Rotherham

St Peter
Attendance: 2,384
Referee: David Procter

27 September 2014
15:00

Plymouth Albion	22–31	Bedfords Blues (BP)
	report Bedford

Brickfields
Attendance: 1,268
Referee: Ian Tempest

27 September 2014
15:00

(BP) Worcester Warriors	55–16	Nottingham Rugby
	report

Sixways
Attendance: 3,826
Referee: Simon Harding

28 September 2014
14:30

Yorkshire Carnegie	23–32	Doncaster Knights (BP)
	report Doncaster

Headingley Stadium
Attendance: 1,858
Referee: Steve Lee

28 September 2014
15:00

(BP) Cornish Pirates	29–19	Moseley
	report

Mennaye Field
Attendance: 1,128
Referee: Andrew Jackson

=== Round 5 ===
4 October 2014
14:30

(BP) Doncaster Knights	22–24	Cornish Pirates
	Doncaster

Castle Park
Attendance: 1,368
Referee: Greg MacDonald

4 October 2014
15:00

Bedford Blues	25–20	Jersey (BP)
	Bedford; Jersey

Goldington Road
Attendance: 2,394
Referee: Andrew Jackson

4 October 2014
15:00

Moseley	14–59	Bristol Rugby (BP)
	report report

Billesley Common
Attendance: 1,049
Referee: Steve Lee

4 October 2014
15:00

Rotherham Titans	7–47	Worcester Warriors (BP)
	Rotherham

Clifton Lane
Attendance: 1,475
Referee: Ian Tempest

5 October 2014
13:00

Nottingham Rugby	26–20	Yorkshire Carnegie (BP)
	report

Meadow Lane
Attendance: 1,077
Referee: Darren Gamage

5 October 2014
15:15

(BP) London Scottish	64–16	Plymouth Albion
	report

Richmond Athletic Ground
Attendance: 1,405
Referee: Tom Foley

=== Round 6 ===
7 November 2014
19:45

Bristol Rugby	24–12	Doncaster Knights
	Report

Ashton Gate
Attendance: 7,589
Referee: Simon Harding

7 November 2014
19:45

(BP) Worcester Warriors	42–12	Bedford Blues
	Report

Sixways
Attendance: 5,824
Referee: Steve Lee

7 November 2014
20:00

(BP) Yorkshire Carnegie	0–6	Rotherham Titans
	Report

Headingley Stadium
Attendance: 2,551
Referee: Ian Tempest

8 November 2014
12:00

Moseley	16–9	London Scottish (BP)
	Report

Billesley
Attendance: 631
Referee: David Proctor

8 November 2014
15:00

Jersey	19–0	Plymouth Albion
	Report

St. Peter
Attendance: 1,630
Referee: Andrew Jackson

9 November 2014
15:00

Cornish Pirates	13–32	Nottingham Rugby (BP)
	Report

Mennaye Field
Attendance: 1,010
Referee: Dean Richards

=== Round 7 ===
14 November 2014
18:45

(BP) London Scottish	38–17	Jersey
	Report

Richmond Athletic Ground
Attendance: 2,108
Referee: Simon Harding

14 November 2014
19:45

Bedford Blues	15–10	Yorkshire Carnegie (BP)
	Report

Goldington Road
Attendance: 2,414
Referee: John Meredith

14 November 2014
20:00

Nottingham Rugby	13–27	Bristol Rugby (BP)
	Report

Meadow Lane
Attendance: 1,347
Referee: Darren Gamage

15 November 2014
14:00

Rotherham Titans	21–13	Cornish Pirates
	Report

Clifton Lane
Attendance: 1,100
Referee: Andrew Jackson

15 November 2014
14:30

Doncaster Knights	13–28	Moseley (BP)
	Report

Castle Park
Attendance: 1,252
Referee: Steve Lee

15 November 2014
17:00

Plymouth Albion	10–22	Worcester Warriors (BP)
	Report

Brickfields
Attendance: 1,406
Referee: Greg MacDonald

=== Round 8 ===
21 November 2014
19:45

(BP) Worcester Warriors	32–29	Jersey (2BP)
	Report

Sixways
Attendance: 5,908
Referee: John Meredith

21 November 2014
20:00

Yorkshire Carnegie	19–19	Plymouth Albion
	Report

Headingley Stadium
Attendance: 1,265
Referee: David Proctor

22 November 2014
14:30

Doncaster Knights	9–19	London Scottish
	Report

Castle Park
Attendance: 1,487
Referee: Darren Gamage

22 November 2014
15:00

(BP) Moseley	26–27	Nottingham Rugby
	Report

Billesley
Attendance: 809
Referee: Greg MacDonald

23 November 2014
15:00

(BP) Bristol Rugby	26–17	Rotherham Titans
	Report

Ashton Gate
Attendance: 6,428
Referee: Luke Pearce

23 November 2014
15:00

(BP) Cornish Pirates	65–14	Bedford Blues
	Report

Mennaye Field
Attendance: 1,087
Referee: Simon Harding

=== Round 9 ===
20 December 2014
14:30

(BP) Jersey	13–17	Yorkshire Carnegie
	Report

St Peter
Attendance: 1,862
Referee: Craig Maxwell Keys

20 December 2014
15:00

London Scottish	17–34	Worcester Warriors (BP)
	Report

Richmond Athletic Ground
Attendance: 2,024
Referee: Dean Richards

21 December 2014
15:00

(BP) Nottingham Rugby	24–3	Doncaster Knights
	Report

Meadow Lane
Attendance: 1,267
Referee: John Meredith

26 December 2014
14:00

(BP) Rotherham Titans	22–26	Moseley (BP)
	Report

Clifton Lane
Attendance: 2,500
Referee: Craig Maxwell Keys

26 December 2014
15:00

(2BP) Bedford Blues	24–28	Bristol Rugby (BP)
	Report

Goldington Road
Attendance: 4,401
Referee: Andrew Small

27 December 2014
15:00

Plymouth Albion	19–27	Cornish Pirates (BP)
	Report

Brickfields
Attendance: 3,982
Referee: David Procter

=== Round 10 ===
27 December 2014
14:30

Yorkshire Carnegie	17–36	Worcester Warriors (BP)
	Report

Headingley Stadium
Attendance: 2,705
Referee: Darren Gamage

1 January 2015
15:00

(BP) Bristol Rugby	55–18	Plymouth Albion
	Report

Ashton Gate
Attendance: 10,701
Referee: Craig Maxwell Keyes

3 January 2015
15:00

Cornish Pirates	30–12	Jersey
	Report

Mennaye Field
Attendance: 1,727
Referee: Tom Foley

3 January 2015
15:00

Moseley	15–23	Bedford Blues
	Report

Billesley
Attendance: 867
Referee: Simon Harding

4 January 2015
12:45

(BP) Doncaster Knights	21–23	Rotherham Titans
	Report

Castle Park
Attendance: 3,676
Referee: Dean Richards

4 January 2015
15:00

Nottingham Rugby	22–21	London Scottish (BP)
	Report

Meadow Lane
Attendance: 1,083
Referee: Steve Lee

=== Round 11 ===
10 January 2015
14:00

Rotherham Titans	19–28	Nottingham Rugby
	Report

Clifton Lane
Attendance: 1,107
Referee: Tim Wigglesworth

10 January 2015
15:00

(BP) Bedford Blues	35–29	Doncaster Knights (BP)
	Report

Goldington Road
Attendance: 2,114
Referee: Andrew Jackson

10 January 2015
15:00

Jersey	17–27	Bristol Rugby (BP)
	Report

St Peter
Attendance: 2,054
Referee: Darren Gamage

10 January 2015
15:00

(BP) London Scottish	26–22	Yorkshire Carnegie (BP)
	Report

Richmond Athletic Ground
Attendance: 1,570
Referee: Tom Foley

10 January 2015
15:00

Plymouth Albion	19–18	Moseley (BP)
	Report

Brickfields
Attendance: 1,881
Referee: Ian Tempest

10 January 2015
15:00

(BP) Worcester Warriors	62–26	Cornish Pirates (BP)
	Report

Sixways
Attendance: 6,415
Referee: Craig Maxwell-Keys

=== Round 12 ===
16 January 2015
19:45

(BP) London Scottish	27–15	Cornish Pirates
	Report

Richmond Athletic Ground
Attendance: 1,346
Referee: Wayne Barnes

17 January 2015
14:00

(BP) Rotherham Titans	34–19	Bedford Blues
	Report

Clifton Lane
Attendance: 1,386
Referee: Greg McDonald

17 January 2015
14:30

(BP) Doncaster Knights	19–26	Jersey
	Report

Castle Park
Attendance: 1,343
Referee: Simon Harding

17 January 2015
15:00

Moseley	10–50	Worcester Warriors (BP)
	Report

Billesley Common
Attendance: 1,677
Referee: Andrew Jackson

18 January 2015
15:00

(BP) Bristol Rugby	29–28	Yorkshire Carnegie (2BP)
	Report

Ashton Gate
Attendance: 7,291
Referee: Tim Wigglesworth

18 January 2015
15:00

Nottingham Rugby	22–19	Plymouth Albion (BP)
	Report

Lady Bay Sports Ground
Attendance: 1,650

=== Round 13 ===
31 January 2015
15:00

Bedford Blues	12–29	London Scottish (BP)
	Report

Goldington Road
Attendance: 2,441
Referee: Ian Tempest

31 January 2015
15:00

Jersey	12–10	Nottingham Rugby (BP)
	Report

St Peter
Attendance: 1,775
Referee: Andrew Small

31 January 2015
15:00

(BP) Plymouth Albion	22–8	Rotherham Titans
	Report

Brickfields
Attendance: 1,268
Referee: Steve Lee

31 January 2015
15:00

(BP) Worcester Warriors	25–5	Doncaster Knights
	Report

Sixways Stadium
Attendance: 5,643
Referee: JP Doyle

1 February 2015
15:00

(BP) Cornish Pirates	45–38	Bristol Rugby (2BP)
	Report

Mennaye Field
Attendance: 2,390
Referee: Greg Garner

1 February 2015
15:00

(BP) Yorkshire Carnegie	32–17	Moseley
	Report

Headingley Stadium
Attendance: 2,141
Referee: Dean Richards

=== Round 14 ===
7 February 2015
14:00

Rotherham Titans	20–20	Jersey
	Report

Clifton Lane
Attendance: 1,018
Referee: Matthew O'Grady

7 February 2015
14:30

Doncaster Knights	29–16	Yorkshire Carnegie
	Report

Castle Park
Attendance: 1,575
Referee: Tom Foley

7 February 2015
15:00

(BP) Bedford Blues	38–8	Plymouth Albion
	Report

Goldington Road
Attendance: 1,833
Referee: Simon Harding

7 February 2015
15:00

London Scottish	17–25	Bristol Rugby (BP)
	Report

Richmond Athletic Ground
Attendance: 2,098
Referee: JP Doyle

7 February 2015
15:00

Moseley	22–18	Cornish Pirates (BP)
	Report

Billesley
Attendance: 869
Referee: Matt Carley

8 February 2015
15:00

Nottingham Rugby	3–58	Worcester Warriors (BP)
	Report

Lady Bay Sports Ground
Attendance: 1,320
Referee: Greg Garner

=== Round 15 ===
14 February 2015
12:35

(BP) Worcester Warriors	49–10	Rotherham Titans
	Report

Sixways Stadium
Attendance: 5,983
Referee: Ian Tempest

14 February 2015
15:00

Jersey	17–3	Bedford Blues
	Report

St Peter
Attendance: 1,848
Referee: Craig Maxwell Keys

15 February 2015
15:00

(BP) Bristol Rugby	52–24	Moseley (BP)
	Report

Ashton Gate
Attendance: 7,568
Referee: Andrew Jackson

15 February 2015
15:00

Cornish Pirates	13–30	Doncaster Knights
	Report

Mennaye Field
Attendance: 1,256
Referee: Dean Richards

15 February 2015
15:00

Plymouth Albion	12–12	London Scottish
	Report

Brickfields
Attendance: 1,175
Referee: Matt Carley

15 February 2015
15:00

(BP) Yorkshire Carnegie	43–14	Nottingham Rugby
	Report

Headingley Stadium
Attendance: 1,145
Referee: Greg MacDonald

=== Round 16 ===
20 February 2015
20:00

(BP) Nottingham Rugby	14–16	Cornish Pirates
	Report

Lady Bay Sports Ground
Attendance: 1,121
Referee: Darren Gamage

21 February 2015
14:00

(BP) Rotherham Titans	40–15	Yorkshire Carnegie
	Report

Clifton Lane
Attendance: 1,451
Referee: Simon Harding

21 February 2015
14:30

Doncaster Knights	12–27	Bristol Rugby (BP)
	Report

Castle Park
Attendance: 1,552
Referee: Andrew Small

21 February 2015
15:00

Bedford Blues	17–32	Worcester Warriors (BP)
	Report

Goldington Road
Attendance: 2,683
Referee: Tom Foley

21 February 2015
15:00

(BP) London Scottish	35–3	Moseley
	Report

Richmond Athletic Ground
Attendance: 1,553
Referee: Greg MacDonald

21 February 2015
15:00

Plymouth Albion	18–17	Jersey (BP)
	Report

Brickfields
Attendance: 1,272
Referee: Luke Pearce

=== Round 17 ===
6 March 2015
19:30

(BP) Moseley	17–20	Doncaster Knights
	Report

Billesley
Attendance: 1,116
Referee: Tim Wigglesworth

6 March 2015
19:45

(BP) Bristol Rugby	51–17	Nottingham Rugby
	Report

Ashton Gate
Attendance: 7,870
Referee: Tom Foley

7 March 2015
15:00

Jersey	18–31	London Scottish
	Report

St Peter
Attendance: 2,223
Referee: Steve Lee

7 March 2015
15:00

(BP) Worcester Warriors	29–8	Plymouth Albion
	Report

Sixways
Attendance: 4,582
Referee: Ian Tempest

8 March 2015
15:00

Yorkshire Carnegie	15–8	Bedford Blues (BP)
	Report

Headingley Stadium
Attendance: 1,846
Referee: David Procter

8 March 2015
15:15

Cornish Pirates	10–28	Rotherham Titans
	Report

Mennaye Field
Attendance: 1,230
Referee: Greg MacDonald

=== Round 18 ===
20 March 2015
19:45

Bedford Blues	21–31	Cornish Pirates (BP)
	Report

Goldington Road
Attendance: 2,633
Referee: Tim Wigglesworth

20 March 2015
19:45

London Scottish	13–13	Doncaster Knights
	Report

Richmond Athletic Ground
Attendance: 1,648
Referee: Greg Garner

21 March 2015
15:00

Jersey	23–21	Worcester Warriors (BP)
	Report

St Peter
Attendance: 2,909
Referee: Andrew Small

21 March 2015
15:00

(BP) Nottingham Rugby	49–32	Moseley (BP)
	Report

Lady Bay Sports Ground
Attendance: 1,046
Referee: Steve Lee

21 March 2015
15:00

Plymouth Albion	17–28	Yorkshire Carnegie (BP)
	Report

Brickfields
Attendance: 1,772
Referee: Darren Gamage

21 March 2015
15:00

Rotherham Titans	25–27	Bristol Rugby
	Report

Clifton Lane
Attendance: 1,243
Referee: Dean Richards

=== Round 19 ===
27 March 2015
19:30

(2BP) Moseley	26–32	Rotherham Titans (BP)
	Report

Billesley Common
Attendance: 983
Referee: Andrew Small

28 March 2015
14:30

(2BP) Doncaster Knights	25–28	Nottingham Rugby
	Report

Castle Park
Attendance: 1,473
Referee: Ian Tempest

28 March 2015
15:00

(BP) Worcester Warriors	56–15	London Scottish
	Report

Sixways Stadium
Attendance: 6,697
Referee: Greg MacDonald

29 March 2015
15:00

(BP) Bristol Rugby	38–14	Bedford Blues
	Report

Ashton Gate
Attendance: 7,435
Referee: Steve Lee

29 March 2015
15:00

Cornish Pirates	27–16	Plymouth Albion
	Report

Mennaye Field
Attendance: 1,650
Referee: Dean Richards

28 March 2015
15:00

Yorkshire Carnegie	16–12	Jersey (BP)
	Report

Headingley Stadium
Attendance: 1,561
Referee: Andrew Jackson

=== Round 20 ===
11 April 2015
14:30

Jersey	28–26	Cornish Pirates (2BP)
	Report

St Peter
Attendance: 2,241
Referee: Tim Wigglesworth

11 April 2015
15:00

(BP) Bedford Blues	31–21	Moseley
	Report

Goldington Road
Attendance: 1,907
Referee: Tom Foley

11 April 2015
15:00

(BP) London Scottish	34–29	Nottingham Rugby (2BP)
	Report

Richmond Athletic Ground
Attendance: 1,892
Referee: Dean Richards

11 April 2015
15:00

Plymouth Albion	7–65	Bristol Rugby (BP)
	Report

Brickfields
Attendance: 1,985
Referee: Craig Maxwell-Keys

11 April 2015
15:00

Rotherham Titans	26–25	Doncaster Knights (2BP)
	Report

Clifton Lane
Attendance: 1,724
Referee: Andrew Small

11 April 2015
15:00

(BP) Worcester Warriors	39–26	Yorkshire Carnegie (BP)
	Report

Sixways Stadium
Attendance: 6,045
Referee: Ian Tempest

=== Round 21 ===
17 April 2015
19:45

(BP) Bristol Rugby	40–29	Jersey (BP)
	Report

Ashton Gate
Attendance: 7,649
Referee: Greg MacDonald

17 April 2015
20:00

Nottingham Rugby	10–21	Rotherham Titans
	Report

Lady Bay Sports Ground
Attendance: 1,514
Referee: Thomas Foley

18 April 2015
14:30

Doncaster Knights	25–19	Bedford Blues (BP)
	Report

Castle Park
Attendance: 1,569
Referee: David Proctor

18 April 2015
15:00

Cornish Pirates	8–69	Worcester Warriors (BP)
	Report

Mennaye Field
Attendance: 2,259
Referee: Darren Gamage

18 April 2015
15:00

Moseley	29–0	Plymouth Albion
	Report

Billesley
Attendance: 2,306
Referee: Tim Wigglesworth

19 April 2015
15:00

(BP) Yorkshire Carnegie	46–7	London Scottish
	Report

Headingley Stadium
Attendance: 1,568
Referee: Simon Harding

=== Round 22 ===
25 April 2015
15:00

Bedford Blues	17–26	Nottingham Rugby
	Report

Goldington Road
Attendance: 2,517
Referee: Andrew Small

25 April 2015
15:00

(BP) Jersey	40–21	Moseley
	Report

St Peter
Attendance: 2,157
Referee: David Proctor

25 April 2015
15:00

(BP) Plymouth Albion	16–19	Doncaster Knights
	Report

Brickfields
Attendance: 1,486
Referee: Matthew O'Grady

25 April 2015
15:00

Rotherham Titans	19–3	London Scottish
	Report

Abbeydale Park, Sheffield
Attendance: 1,554
Referee: Andrew Jackson

25 April 2015
15:00

(BP) Worcester Warriors	26–30	Bristol Rugby
	Report

Sixways Stadium
Attendance: 10,395
Referee: Craig Maxwell Keys

25 April 2015
15:00

Yorkshire Carnegie	27–5	Cornish Pirates
	Report

Headingley Stadium
Attendance: 1,624
Referee: Steve Lee

== Play-offs ==
=== Semi-finals ===
The semifinals followed a 1 v 4, 2 v 3 system – with the games being played over two-legs with the higher placed team deciding who played at home in the first leg.

==== First leg ====
2 May 2015
13:30

Bristol Rugby	32–20	Rotherham Titans
	Report

Ashton Gate
Attendance: 7,381
Referee: Matt Carley

2 May 2015
13:45

London Scottish	22–27	Worcester Warriors
	Report

Richmond Athletic Ground
Attendance: 1,825
Referee: Greg Garner

==== Second leg ====
8 May 2015
19:45

Worcester Warriors	38–15	London Scottish
	Report

Sixways Stadium
Attendance: 6,658
Referee: Ian Tempest

- Worcester Warriors won 65 – 37 on aggregate

10 May 2015
13:45

Rotherham Titans	16–24	Bristol Rugby
	Report

Abbeydale Park, Sheffield
Attendance: 3,227
Referee: Dean Richards

- Bristol Rugby won 56 – 36 on aggregate

=== Final ===
The final is played over two legs – with the higher placed team deciding who played at home in the first leg.

==== First leg ====
20 May 2015
19:45

Bristol Rugby	28–29	Worcester Warriors
Try: Eadie 14', Lemi (2) 35', 71'; Con: Henson (2/2), Robinson (0/1); Pen: Henson 3', 49' (2/4), Robinson 76' (1/1)	Report; Report	Try: Betty 11', Penalty 19', Vuna 28', Biggs 38', Annett 80'; Con: Lamb (2/5); Pen: Lamb (0/1), Pennell (0/1)

Ashton Gate
Attendance: 12,010
Referee: Wayne Barnes

FB	15	(England) Jack Wallace
RW	14	(England) Charlie Amesbury
OC	13	(Wales) Gareth Maule
IC	12	(Wales) Gavin Henson	(substituted off) 70'
LW	11	(Samoa) David Lemi
FH	10	(Wales) Matthew Morgan	(substituted off) 56'
SH	9	(Wales) Dwayne Peel (c)	(substituted off) 73'
N8	8	(Scotland) Mitch Eadie
OF	7	(Samoa) Jack Lam
BF	6	(Wales) Ryan Jones	(substituted off) 18'	(substituted on) 35'	(substituted off) 50'
RL	5	(New Zealand) Mark Sorenson
LL	4	(England) Glen Townson	(substituted off) 50'
TP	3	(Argentina) Gaston Cortes	(yellow card) 18' to 28'	(substituted off) 70'
HK	2	(England) Chris Brooker	(substituted off) 70'
LP	1	(Scotland) Kyle Traynor
Replacements:
HK	16	(England) Max Crumpton	(substituted on) 70'
TP	17	(Samoa) Anthony Perenise	(substituted on) 18'	(yellow card) 25' to 35'	(substituted on) 70'
LK	18	(England) Ben Glynn	(substituted on) 50'
FL	19	(Zimbabwe) Marco Mama	(substituted on) 50'
SH	20	(England) Tom Kessell	(substituted on) 73'
FB	21	(Wales) Nicky Robinson	(substituted on) 56'
CE	22	(Ireland) Jack Tovey	(substituted on) 70'
	Coach: (England) Andy Robinson

FB	15	(England) Chris Pennell
RW	14	(England) Tom Biggs
OC	13	(Scotland) Alex Grove
IC	12	(England) Ryan Mills
LW	11	(Australia) Cooper Vuna	(substituted off) 75'
FH	10	(England) Ryan Lamb
SH	9	(Wales) Jean-Baptiste Bruzulier
N8	8	(South Africa) Gerrit-Jan van Velze (c)
OF	7	(England) Sam Betty
BF	6	(Zimbabwe) Mike Williams
RL	5	(Wales) Jonathan Thomas
LL	4	(England) James Percival	(substituted off) 64'
TP	3	(South Africa) Nick Schonert	(substituted off) 73'
HK	2	(Argentina) Agustín Creevy	(substituted off) 76'
LP	1	(Georgia (country)) Val Rapava-Ruskin	(substituted off) 62'
Replacements:
HK	16	(Ireland) Niall Annett	(substituted on) 76'
LP	17	(England) Ryan Bower	(substituted on) 62'
TP	18	(Wales) Joe Rees	(substituted on) 73'
FL	19	(Argentina) Leonardo Senatore	(substituted on) 64'
SH	20	(England) Jamie Shillcott
CE	21	(Fiji) Ravai Fatiaki
WG	22	(England) Ben Howard	(substituted on) 75'
Coach: (England) Dean Ryan

Touch judges:
(England) Luke Pearce
(England) Ian Tempest
Television match official:
(England) Graham Hughes

==== Second leg ====
27 May 2015
19:45

Worcester Warriors	30–30	Bristol Rugby
Try: Pennell (2) 32', 80'; Con: Lamb (3/3); Pen: Lamb 6', 25', 34' (3/4); Drop: Lamb (0/1)	Report; Report	Try: Lam 60', Tovey 67', Morgan 71'; Con: Robinson (3/3); Pen: Robinson 16', 29', 44' (3/6)

Sixways Stadium
Attendance: 12,024
Referee: JP Doyle

FB	15	(England) Chris Pennell
RW	14	(England) Tom Biggs
OC	13	(Scotland) Alex Grove	(substituted off) 70'
IC	12	(England) Ryan Mills
LW	11	(Australia) Cooper Vuna	(yellow card) 60' to 70'
FH	10	(England) Ryan Lamb
SH	9	(Wales) Jean-Baptiste Bruzulier
N8	8	(South Africa) Gerrit-Jan van Velze (c)
OF	7	(England) Sam Betty	(substituted off) 67'
BF	6	(Zimbabwe) Mike Williams
RL	5	(Wales) Jonathan Thomas
LL	4	(England) James Percival
TP	3	(South Africa) Nick Schonert	(substituted off) 69'
HK	2	(Argentina) Agustín Creevy	(substituted off) 65'
LP	1	(Georgia (country)) Val Rapava-Ruskin	(substituted off) 48'
Replacements:
HK	16	(Ireland) Niall Annett	(substituted on) 65'
LP	17	(England) Ryan Bower	(substituted on) 48'
TP	18	(Wales) Joe Rees	(substituted on) 69'
FL	19	(Argentina) Leonardo Senatore	(substituted on) 67'
SH	20	(England) Jamie Shillcott
CE	21	(Fiji) Ravai Fatiaki
FB	22	(England) Ben Howard	(substituted on) 70'
	Coach: (England) Dean Ryan

FB	15	(England) Jack Wallace	(substituted off) 57'
RW	14	(England) Charlie Amesbury
OC	13	(Ireland) Jack Tovey
IC	12	(England) Ben Mosses
LW	11	(Samoa) David Lemi
FH	10	(Wales) Nicky Robinson
SH	9	(Wales) Dwayne Peel (c)	(yellow card) 79' to 80'
N8	8	(Scotland) Mitch Eadie
OF	7	(Samoa) Jack Lam	(yellow card) 74' to 80'
BF	6	(Zimbabwe) Marco Mama
RL	5	(New Zealand) Mark Sorenson	(substituted off) 74'
LL	4	(England) Ben Glynn
TP	3	(Argentina) Gaston Cortes	(substituted off) 54'
HK	2	(England) Chris Brooker	(substituted off) 70'
LP	1	(Scotland) Kyle Traynor
Replacements:
HK	16	(England) Max Crumpton	(substituted on) 70'
TP	17	(Samoa) Anthony Perenise	(substituted on) 54'
LK	18	(England) Glen Townson	(substituted on) 74'
FL	19	(England) Olly Robinson
SH	20	(England) Tom Kessell
FB	21	(Wales) Matthew Morgan	(substituted on) 57'
CE	22	(Wales) Gareth Maule
Coach: (England) Andy Robinson

Touch judges:
(England) Luke Pearce
(England) Greg Garner
Television match official:
(England) David Grashoff

Worcester win 59 – 58 on aggregate

== Attendances ==
- Includes play-off games where applicable

Club	Home Games	Total	Average	Highest	Lowest	% Capacity
Bedford Blues	11	27,454	2,496	4,401	1,833	50%
Bristol Rugby	13	104,710	8,055	12,010	6,428	37%
Cornish Pirates	11	16,270	1,479	2,390	1,010	37%
Doncaster Knights	11	18,024	1,639	3,676	1,252	33%
Jersey	11	22,997	2,091	2,909	1,630	42%
London Scottish	12	19,935	1,661	2,108	1,087	37%
Moseley	11	12,077	1,098	2,306	631	37%
Nottingham Rugby	11	14,053	1,278	1,650	1,046	34%
Plymouth Albion	11	18,727	1,702	3,982	1,175	20%
Rotherham Titans	12	18,885	1,574	3,227	1,018	63%
Worcester Warriors	13	84,376	6,490	12,024	3,826	54%
Yorkshire Carnegie	11	20,286	1,844	2,705	1,145	9%

== Individual statistics ==
- Note that points scorers includes tries as well as conversions, penalties and drop goals. Stats also include promotion play-offs.

=== Top points scorers ===
Rank	Player	Team	Appearances	Points
1	(Scotland) Dougie Flockhart	Doncaster Knights	22	229
2	(Ireland) Peter Lydon	London Scottish	24	216
3	(Ireland) Kieran Hallett	Cornish Pirates	21	196
4	(Scotland) Harry Leonard	Yorkshire Carnegie	22	170
5	(Ireland) James McKinney	Rotherham Titans	20	158
6	(Wales) Matthew Morgan	Bristol	21	157
7	(New Zealand) Mark Bright	London Scottish	23	130
8	(England) Ryan Lamb	Worcester Warriors	15	128
9	(Canada) James Pritchard	Bedford Blues	15	117
10	(England) Andy Symons	Worcester Warriors	18	115

=== Top try scorers ===
Rank	Player	Team	Appearances	Tries
1	(New Zealand) Mark Bright	London Scottish	23	26
2	(England) Max Stelling	Worcester Warriors	20	15
3	(England) Sam Smith	Worcester Warriors	17	14
3	(England) Tom Biggs	Worcester Warriors	22	14
4	(England) Sam Betty	Worcester Warriors	19	13
5	(Samoa) David Lemi	Bristol	18	12
5	(New Zealand) Brent Wilson	Nottingham Rugby	18	12
6	(England) Oliver Robinson	Bristol	14	11
6	(Wales) Patrick Tapley	Bedford Blues	21	11
6	(England) Matt Williams	London Scottish	23	11
6	(Scotland) Mitch Eadie	Bristol	24	11

=== RFU Dream Team XV ===
The RFU Dream Team is picked by the coaches of the twelve championship teams. Bristol playmaker Morgan attracted the highest number of votes for an individual player with eight, one more than Cornish Pirates pair Tom Kessell and Darren Barry and Nottingham's Shaun Malton. Meanwhile, London Scottish number 8 Bright makes the Dream Team for the third year in a row and is the only player to retain his place from last season.

- 15 Paul Jarvis (Doncaster Knights)
- 14 Sam Smith (Worcester Warriors)
- 13 Max Stelling (Worcester Warriors)
- 12 Andy Symons (Worcester Warriors)
- 11 David Lemi (Bristol Rugby)
- 10 Matthew Morgan (Bristol Rugby)
- 9 Tom Kessell (Cornish Pirates)
- 1 Sam Lockwood (Jersey)
- 2 Shaun Malton (Nottingham Rugby)
- 3 Harry Williams (Jersey)
- 4 Mike Williams (Worcester Warriors)
- 5 Darren Barry (Cornish Pirates)
- 6 Alex Rieder (Rotherham Titans)
- 7 Jack Preece (Rotherham Titans)
- 8 Mark Bright (London Scottish)

== Season records ==
=== Team ===
Largest home win — 51 pts

65 - 14 Cornish Pirates at home to Bedford Blues on 23 November 2014

Largest away win — 61 pts

69 - 8 Worcester Warriors away to Cornish Pirates on 18 April 2015

Most points scored — 69 pts

69 - 8 Worcester Warriors away to Cornish Pirates on 18 April 2015

Most tries in a match — 10 (x2)

London Scottish at home to Plymouth Albion on 4 October 2014
Worcester Warriors away to Cornish Pirates on 18 April 2015

Most conversions in a match — 8

Worcester Warriors away to Cornish Pirates on 18 April 2015

Most penalties in a match — 7 (x2)

Moseley away to Doncaster Knights on 15 November 2014
London Scottish away to Nottingham Rugby on 4 January 2015

Most drop goals in a match — 1

N/A - multiple teams

=== Player ===
Most points in a match — 25

(England) Lawrence Rayner for Plymouth Albion away to Rotherham Titans on 20 September 2014

Most tries in a match — 4 (x2)

(England) Sam Smith for Worcester Warriors away to Yorkshire Carnegie on 27 December 2014
(England) Olly Robinson for Bristol Rugby away to Plymouth Albion on 11 April 2015

Most conversions in a match — 8

(England) Andy Symons for Worcester Warriors away to Cornish Pirates on 18 April 2015

Most penalties in a match — 7 (x2)

(England) Sam Olver for Moseley away to Doncaster Knights on 15 November 2014
(Ireland) Peter Lydon for London Scottish away to Nottingham Rugby on 4 January 2015

Most drop goals in a match — 1

N/A - multiple players

=== Attendances ===
Highest — 12,024

Worcester Warriors at home to Bristol on 27 May 2015

Lowest — 631

Moseley at home to London Scottish on 8 November 2014

Highest Average Attendance — 8,055

Bristol Rugby

Lowest Average Attendance — 1,098

Moseley
