= Joe Rees =

Joe Rees may refer to:

- Joe Rees (rugby union, born 1893), Welsh international rugby union player
- Joe Rees (rugby union, born 1990), Welsh rugby union player
