= Talite =

Talite is a given name. Notable people with the given name include:

- Talite Liavaʻa (born 1971), Tongan rugby league player
- Talite Vaioleti (born 1980), Tongan rugby union player
