= Ross Johnson =

Ross Johnson may refer to:

- Ross Johnson (rugby union) (born 1986), Cardiff Blues rugby union player
- F. Ross Johnson (1931–2016), Canadian businessman
- Ross Johnson (politician) (1939-2017), California state senator and assemblyman
- Ross Johnson (Australian footballer) (born 1951), Australian rules footballer
- Ross Johnson (English footballer) (born 1970), English footballer

== See also ==
- Ross Johnstone (1926–2009), ice hockey player
