= Sam Lockwood =

Former England students player

- Born: Samuel Lockwood; 8 April 1988 (age 38) Dewsbury
- Height: 6 ft 2 in (188 cm)
- Weight: 18 st 12 lb (264 lb; 120 kg)

Rugby union career
- Position: Prop
- Current team: Newcastle Falcons
Senior career
Years	Team	Apps	(Points)
2011–2014	Leeds Carnegie	42	(10)
2014–2016	Jersey Reds	47	(20)
2016–	Newcastle Falcons	42	(0)
- Correct as of 19 May 2019

Samuel Lockwood (born 8 April 1988) is an English former rugby union player for Newcastle Falcons in Premiership Rugby. His primary position is prop.

Amongst various early jobs including a lifeguard and a firefighter in Suffolk, Lockwood began playing rugby at Middlesbrough RUFC and did not start playing prop until he was 21 years old. Lockwood was a student at Leeds Metropolitan University and began playing for Leeds Carnegie in the RFU Championship, England's second tier. Lockwood joined Jersey in January 2014, initially on loan until the end of that season. His form for Jersey saw him named in the 2014-15 RFU Championship Dream Team. Then in 2016 Lockwood joined Newcastle Falcons in Premiership Rugby, England's top tier. On 30 January 2019 Lockwood signed a new two-year contract with Newcastle.

Lockwood became director of rugby at Norwich RUFC in 2022 along with joining Langley School to become the head rugby coach.
