= 2013–14 National League 1 =

Rugby union competition in England

- Countries: England
- Champions: Doncaster Knights (2013–14)
- Runners-up: Rosslyn Park
- Relegated: Henley Hawks, Worthing Raiders and Hull Ionians
- Matches played: 240
- Attendance: 143,750 (average 599 per match)
- Highest attendance: 1,756 Rosslyn Park at home to Doncaster Knights on 29 March 2014
- Lowest attendance: 100 Loughborough Students at home to Hull Ionians on 22 March 2014
- Tries scored: 1558 (average 6.5 per match)
- Top point scorer: (England) Clifford Hodgson (Coventry) 374
- Top try scorer: (England) Tyson Lewis (Doncaster Knights) 22

The 2013–14 National League 1, known for sponsorship reasons as the SSE National League 1 is the fifth season of the third tier of the English domestic rugby union competitions, since the professionalised format of the second tier RFU Championship was introduced. After being relegated last season, Doncaster Knights are the champions and became the first team to be promoted straight back to the RFU Championship for the 2014–15 season. The teams promoted last season from 2012–13 National League 2 South and 2012–13 National League 2 North, Henley Hawks, Hull Ionians and Worthing Raiders finished in the bottom three places with Henley and Worthing to join the 2014–15 National League 2 South and Ionians to the 2014–15 National League 2 North.

== Participating teams and locations ==
National 1 teams in England
Greater London National League 1 clubs

After eight seasons in the second tier, Doncaster Knights find themselves playing in this league following their relegation from the RFU Championship. Henley Hawks and Hull Ionians were promoted as champions of their respected leagues National League 2 South and National League 2 North respectively. The third team to win promotion to the league was Worthing Raiders who beat Stourbridge in the promotion play-off 28–26. It is the first appearance at this level for both Hull Ionians and Worthing Raiders.

| Team | Stadium | Capacity | City/Area |
|---|---|---|---|
| Blackheath | Rectory Field | 3,500 (500 seats) | Blackheath, London |
| Blaydon | Crow Trees | 2,000 (400 seats) | Swalwell, Tyne and Wear |
| Cinderford | Dockham Road | 2,500 | Cinderford, Gloucestershire |
| Coventry | Butts Park Arena | 4,000 (3,000 seats) | Coventry |
| Doncaster Knights | Castle Park | 3,075 | Doncaster |
| Esher | Molesey Road | 3,000 (1,200 seats) | Hersham, Surrey |
| Fylde | Woodlands Memorial Ground | 7,500 (500 seats) | Lytham St. Annes, Lancashire |
| Henley Hawks | Dry Leas | 4,000 | Henley-on-Thames |
| Hull Ionians | Brantingham Park | 1,500 (240 seats) | Brantingham, East Riding of Yorkshire |
| Loughborough Students | Loughborough University Stadium | 3,000 | Loughborough, Leicestershire |
| Old Albanian | Woollam Playing Fields | 1,000 | St Albans, Hertfordshire |
| Richmond | Athletic Ground | 4,500 (1,000 seats) | Richmond, London |
| Rosslyn Park | The Rock | 2,000 (630 seats) | Roehampton, London |
| Tynedale | Tynedale Park | 2,000 (400 seats) | Corbridge, Northumberland |
| Wharfedale | The Avenue | 2,000 | Threshfield, Craven, North Yorkshire |
| Worthing Raiders | Roundstone Lane | 1,500 (100 seats) | Angmering, West Sussex |

== Structure ==
The league consists of sixteen teams with all the teams playing each other on a home and away basis to make a total of thirty matches each. There is one promotion place and three relegation places.

== League table ==
2013–14 National League 1 Final table
| Pos | Team | Pld | W | D | L | PF | PA | PD | TB | LB | Pts | Qualification |
|---|---|---|---|---|---|---|---|---|---|---|---|---|
| 1 | Doncaster Knights (P) | 30 | 25 | 0 | 5 | 943 | 487 | +456 | 18 | 4 | 122 | Promoted |
| 2 | Rosslyn Park | 30 | 25 | 1 | 4 | 915 | 413 | +502 | 14 | 3 | 119 | |
| 3 | Fylde | 30 | 17 | 0 | 13 | 822 | 732 | +90 | 19 | 5 | 92 | |
| 4 | Coventry | 30 | 19 | 0 | 11 | 878 | 621 | +257 | 15 | 4 | 90 (Note: Coventry deducted 5 points after selecting an ineligible player on 5 January 2014 against Rosslyn Park.) | |
| 5 | Esher | 30 | 18 | 0 | 12 | 786 | 694 | +92 | 12 | 4 | 88 | |
| 6 | Blaydon | 30 | 15 | 3 | 12 | 736 | 599 | +137 | 12 | 6 | 84 | |
| 7 | Richmond | 30 | 14 | 1 | 15 | 761 | 699 | +62 | 15 | 7 | 80 | |
| 8 | Blackheath | 30 | 13 | 3 | 14 | 680 | 775 | −95 | 11 | 4 | 73 | |
| 9 | Wharfedale | 30 | 15 | 0 | 15 | 726 | 907 | −181 | 9 | 3 | 72 | |
| 10 | Old Albanian | 30 | 13 | 1 | 16 | 708 | 693 | +15 | 12 | 6 | 72 | |
| 11 | Cinderford | 30 | 12 | 2 | 16 | 699 | 844 | −145 | 11 | 4 | 67 | |
| 12 | Loughborough Students | 30 | 13 | 1 | 16 | 633 | 768 | −135 | 8 | 4 | 66 | |
| 13 | Tynedale | 30 | 11 | 2 | 17 | 702 | 891 | −189 | 13 | 4 | 65 | |
| 14 | Henley Hawks (R) | 30 | 11 | 3 | 16 | 593 | 655 | −62 | 6 | 5 | 61 | Relegated |
| 15 | Worthing Raiders (R) | 30 | 7 | 0 | 23 | 736 | 946 | −210 | 16 | 11 | 55 | Relegated |
| 16 | Hull Ionians (R) | 30 | 3 | 1 | 26 | 492 | 1086 | −594 | 4 | 2 | 20 | Relegated |

Updated to match(es) played on 8 May 2014. Source: statbunker.com and RFU
Rules for classification: If teams are level at any stage, tiebreakers are applied in the following order:
1. Number of matches won
2. Difference between points for and against
3. Total number of points for
4. Aggregate number of points scored in matches between tied teams
5. Number of matches won excluding the first match, then the second and so on until the tie is settled
  (P) Promoted; (R) Relegated
  Notes:

== Fixtures ==
=== Round 1 ===
7 September 2013
14:30

| Blaydon | 9 – 34 | Loughborough Students (BP) |

Crow Trees
Attendance: 275
Referee: Marcus Caton

7 September 2013
14:30

| (BP) Cinderford | 6 – 11 | Rosslyn Park |

Dockham Road
Attendance: 371
Referee: Shane Lewis

7 September 2013
14:30

| (BP) Doncaster Knights | 47 – 17 | Blackheath |

Castle Park
Attendance: 850
Referee: Andrew Johnson

7 September 2013
15:00

| (BP) Henley Hawks | 51 – 17 | Tynedale |

Dry Leas
Attendance: 625
Referee: Robert Warburton

7 September 2013
15:00

| Hull Ionians | 12 – 41 | Coventry (BP) |

Brantingham Park
Attendance: 450
Referee: Llyr Ap Geraint-Roberts

7 September 2013
15:00

| (2BP) Old Albanian | 41 – 45 | Fylde (BP) |

Woollam Playing Fields
Attendance: 325
Referee: Phil Davies

7 September 2013
15:00

| (2BP) Richmond | 22 – 28 | Esher |

Athletic Ground
Attendance: 820
Referee: Nicholas Cockburn

7 September 2013
15:00

| (BP) Wharfedale | 38 – 34 | Worthing Raiders (2BP) |

The Avenue
Attendance: 568
Referee: Andy Taylorson

=== Round 2 ===
14 September 2013
14:00

| (BP) Loughborough Students | 26 – 19 | Old Albanian (BP) |

Loughborough University Stadium
Attendance: 250
Referee: David Procter

14 September 2013
15:00

| (BP) Coventry | 38 – 13 | Cinderford |

Butts Park Arena
Attendance: 1,184
Referee: Richard Kelly

14 September 2013
15:00

| (BP) Esher | 40 – 30 | Henley Hawks |

Molesey Road
Attendance: 325
Referee: Steve Lewis

14 September 2013
15:00

| (BP) Fylde | 34 – 21 | Wharfedale |

Woodlands Memorial Ground
Attendance: 583
Referee: Andrew Rawson

14 September 2013
15:00

| Hull Ionians | 19 – 40 | Doncaster Knights (BP) |

Brantingham Park
Attendance: 550
Referee: Steve Lee

14 September 2013
15:00

| Rosslyn Park | 26 – 15 | Richmond |

The Rock
Attendance: 460
Referee: Craig Maxwell-Keys

14 September 2013
15:00

| Tynedale | 25 – 24 | Blaydon (BP) |

Tynedale Park
Attendance: 650
Referee: Wayne Falla

14 September 2013
15:00

| (BP) Worthing Raiders | 22 – 27 | Blackheath (BP) |

Roundstone Lane
Attendance: 1,045
Referee: Nick Cockburn

=== Round 3 ===
21 September 2013
14:00

| Blaydon | 25 – 35 | Esher (BP) |

Crow Trees
Attendance: 205
Referee: Andrew Jackson

21 September 2013
14:30

| (BP) Cinderford | 31 – 7 | Hull Ionians |

Dockham Road
Attendance: 322
Referee: Andrew Taylorson

21 September 2013
14:30

| (BP) Doncaster Knights | 38 – 17 | Worthing Raiders |

Castle Park
Attendance: 772
Referee: Llyr Ap Geraint-Roberts

21 September 2013
15:00

| (BP) Blackheath | 29 – 31 | Fylde |

Rectory Field
Attendance: 687
Referee: Tom Foley

21 September 2013
15:00

| Henley Hawks | 6 – 6 | Rosslyn Park |

Dry Leas
Attendance: 550
Referee: Tom Davis

21 September 2013
15:00

| (BP) Old Albanian | 29 – 17 | Tynedale |

Woollam Playing Fields
Attendance: 326
Referee: Fergus Kirby

21 September 2013
15:00

| (2BP) Richmond | 31 – 32 | Coventry (BP) |

Athletic Ground
Attendance: 602
Referee: Robert Warburton

21 September 2013
15:00

| (BP) Wharfedale | 26 – 29 | Loughborough Students (BP) |

The Avenue
Attendance: 729
Referee: Karl Kirkpatrick

=== Round 4 ===
28 September 2013
14:00

| (2BP) Loughborough Students | 43 – 50 | Blackheath (BP) |

Loughborough University Stadium
Attendance: 841
Referee: Tom Davis

28 September 2013
14:30

| Cinderford | 5 – 35 | Doncaster Knights (BP) |

Dockham Road
Attendance: 409
Referee: Craig Maxwell-Keys

28 September 2013
14:30

| (BP) Rosslyn Park | 41 – 15 | Blaydon |

The Rock
Attendance: 257
Referee: Richard Kelly

28 September 2013
14:45

| (BP) Hull Ionians | 25 – 41 | Richmond (BP) |

Brantingham Park
Attendance: 350
Referee: Wayne Fella

28 September 2013
15:00

| (BP) Coventry | 32 – 15 | Henley Hawks |

Butts Park Arena
Attendance: 1,460
Referee: Marcus Caton

28 September 2013
15:00

| (BP) Esher | 31 – 10 | Old Albanian |

Molesey Road
Attendance: 536
Referee: Philip Davies

28 September 2013
15:00

| (2BP) Fylde | 45 – 50 | Worthing Raiders (BP) |

Woodlands Memorial Ground
Attendance: 767
Referee: David Proctor

28 September 2013
15:00

| Tynedale | 27 – 40 | Wharfedale |

Tynedale Park
Attendance: 475
Referee: Lly Ap Geraint-Roberts

=== Round 5 ===
5 October 2013
14:00

| Wharfedale | 20 – 19 | Esher (BP) |

The Avenue
Attendance: 715
Referee: Andrew Jackson

5 October 2013
14:30

| Blaydon | 21 – 16 | Coventry (BP) |

Crow Trees
Attendance: 312
Referee: Andrew Taylorson

5 October 2013
14:30

| (BP) Doncaster Knights | 29 – 24 | Fylde (2BP) |

Castle Park
Attendance: 1,004
Referee: Marcus Caton

5 October 2013
15:00

| (BP) Blackheath | 35 – 23 | Tynedale |

Rectory Field
Attendance: 632
Referee: Robert Warburton

5 October 2013
15:00

| (BP) Henley Hawks | 40 – 20 | Hull Ionians |

Dry Leas
Attendance: 460
Referee: Fergus Kirby

5 October 2013
15:00

| (BP) Old Albanian | 24 – 27 | Rosslyn Park |

Woollam Playing Fields
Attendance: 310
Referee: Craig Maxwell-Keys

5 October 2013
15:00

| (BP) Richmond | 55 – 20 | Cinderford |

Athletic Ground
Attendance: 454
Referee: Andrew Rawson

5 October 2013
15:00

| (BP) Worthing Raiders | 24 – 43 | Loughborough Students (BP) |

Roundstone Lane
Attendance: 930
Referee: Richard Kelly

=== Round 6 ===
12 October 2013
14:00

| Loughborough Students | 23 – 7 | Fylde |

Loughborough University Stadium
Attendance: 321
Referee: Lly Ap Geraint-Roberts

12 October 2013
14:15

| Hull Ionians | 5 – 30 | Blaydon (BP) |

Brantingham Park
Attendance: 160
Referee: Wayne Falla

12 October 2013
14:30

| (BP) Cinderford | 34 – 34 | Henley Hawks (BP) |

Dockham Road
Attendance: 316
Referee: Philip Davies

12 October 2013
15:00

| (BP) Tynedale | 37 – 31 | Worthing Raiders (2BP) |

Tynedale Park
Attendance: 400
Referee: Karl Kirkpatrick

12 October 2013
15:00

| Coventry | 24 – 10 | Old Albanian |

Butts Park Arena
Attendance: 1,199
Referee: Dean Richards

12 October 2013
15:00

| Esher | 28 – 20 | Blackheath |

Molesey Road
Attendance: 720
Referee: Shane Lewis

12 October 2013
15:00

| Richmond | 19 – 36 | Doncaster Knights (BP) |

Athletic Ground
Attendance: 582
Referee: Thomas Davis

12 October 2013
15:00

| (BP) Rosslyn Park | 51 – 20 | Wharfedale |

The Rock
Attendance: 423
Referee: Nicholas Cockburn

=== Round 7 ===
19 October 2013
14:30

| (BP) Blaydon | 24 – 14 | Cinderford |

Crow Trees
Attendance: 220
Referee: James Sullivan

19 October 2013
14:30

| (BP) Doncaster Knights | 32 – 3 | Loughborough Students |

Castle Park
Attendance: 1,104
Referee: Andrew Taylorson

19 October 2013
15:00

| Blackheath | 8 – 21 | Rosslyn Park |

Rectory Field
Attendance: 863
Referee: Simon Harding

19 October 2013
15:00

| (BP) Fylde | 38 – 3 | Tynedale |

Woodlands Memorial Ground
Attendance: 736
Referee: John Meredith

19 October 2013
15:00

| Henley Hawks | 18 – 10 | Richmond |

Dry Leas
Attendance: 745
Referee: Shane Lewis

19 October 2013
15:00

| (BP) Old Albanian | 29 – 13 | Hull Ionians |

Woollam Playing Field
Attendance: 310
Referee: Nick Cockburn

19 October 2013
15:00

| (BP) Wharfedale | 38 – 26 | Coventry (BP) |

The Avenue
Attendance: 812
Referee: Marcus Caton

19 October 2013
15:00

| (BP) Worthing Raiders | 19 – 25 | Esher (BP) |

Roundstone Lane
Attendance: 650
Referee: Philip Davies

=== Round 8 ===
26 October 2013
14:30

| Cinderford | 15 – 10 | Old Albanian (BP) |

Dockham Road
Attendance: 327
Referee: Dan Jones

26 October 2013
14:30

| Richmond | 5 – 24 | Blaydon (BP) |

Athletic Ground
Attendance: 423
Referee: Fergus Kirby

26 October 2013
14:30

| (BP) Tynedale | 21 – 24 | Loughborough Students |

Tynedale Park
Attendance: 350
Referee: Wayne Falla

26 October 2013
15:00

| (BP) Coventry | 63 – 21 | Blackheath |

Butts Park Arena
Attendance: 1,172
Referee: Lly Ap Geraint-Roberts

26 October 2013
15:00

| Esher | 27 – 24 | Fylde (2BP) |

Molesey Road
Attendance: 765
Referee: Richard Kelly

26 October 2013
15:00

| Henley Hawks | 11 – 10 | Doncaster Knights (BP) |

Dry Leas
Attendance: 660
Referee: Philip Davies

26 October 2013
15:00

| (BP) Hull Ionians | 25 – 32 | Wharfedale (BP) |

Brantingham Park
Attendance: 450
Referee: Andrew Rawson

26 October 2013
15:00

| (BP) Rosslyn Park | 48 – 17 | Worthing Raiders |

The Rock
Attendance: 375
Referee: James Sullivan

=== Round 9 ===
2 November 2013
12:45

| (BP) Doncaster Knights | 55 – 3 | Tynedale |

Castle Park
Attendance: 782
Referee: Thomas Davis

2 November 2013
14:00

| (BP) Blaydon | 39 – 5 | Henley Hawks |

Crow Trees
Attendance: 320
Referee: Andrew Jackson

2 November 2013
14:00

| Loughborough Students | 12 – 32 | Esher (BP) |

Loughborough University Stadium
Attendance: 252
Referee: David Procter

2 November 2013
14:00

| (BP) Wharfedale | 40 – 10 | Cinderford |

The Avenue
Attendance: 609
Referee: Waynne Falla

2 November 2013
14:00

| (BP) Worthing Raiders | 39 – 12 | Coventry |

Roundstone Lane
Attendance: 725
Referee: Craig Maxwell-Keys

2 November 2013
15:00

| (BP) Blackheath | 32 – 16 | Hull Ionians |

Rectory Field
Attendance: 593
Referee: Marcus Caton

2 November 2013
15:00

| (BP) Fylde | 26 – 10 | Rosslyn Park |

Woodlands Memorial Ground
Attendance: 735
Referee: Gregg McDonald

2 November 2013
15:00

| Old Albanian | 15 – 10 | Richmond (BP) |

Woolham Playing Fields
Attendance: 280
Referee: Richard Kelly

=== Round 10 ===
8 November 2013
19:30

| (BP) Rosslyn Park | 31 – 5 | Loughborough Students |

The Rock
Attendance: 804
Referee: Nick Cockburn

9 November 2013
13:00

| (BP) Richmond | 13 – 18 | Wharfedale |

Athletic Ground
Attendance: 275
Referee: Phillip Davis

9 November 2013
14:00

| Blaydon | 22 – 14 | Doncaster Knights |

Crow Trees
Attendance: 420
Referee: Llyr ApGeraint-Roberts

9 November 2013
14:00

| (BP) Esher | 56 – 24 | Tynedale |

Molesey Road
Attendance: 385
Referee: Rob Warburton

9 November 2013
14:00

| Hull Ionians | 31 – 20 | Worthing Raiders |

Brantingham Park
Attendance: 210
Referee: Andrew Taylorson

9 November 2013
14:30

| Cinderford | 25 – 0 | Blackheath |

Dockham Road
Attendance: 220
Referee: Mike O'Grady

9 November 2013
15:00

| (BP) Coventry | 32 – 5 | Fylde |

Butts Park Arena
Attendance: 1,040
Referee: Andrew Jackson

9 November 2013
15:00

| (BP) Henley Hawks | 10 – 17 | Old Albanian |

Dry Leas
Attendance: 245
Referee: Shane Lewis

=== Round 11 ===
16 November 2013
12:45

| Doncaster Knights | 19 – 11 | Esher |

Castle Park
Attendance: 997
Referee: Marcus Caton

16 November 2013
14:00

| Loughborough Students | 22 – 45 | Coventry (BP) |

Loughborough University Stadium
Attendance: 300
Referee: Graeme Wells

16 November 2013
14:00

| Tynedale | 13 – 41 | Rosslyn Park (BP) |

Tynedale Park
Attendance: 250
Referee: Karl Kirkpatrick

16 November 2013
14:00

| (BP) Wharfedale | 39 – 24 | Henley Hawks |

The Avenue
Attendance: 560
Referee: Lly Apgeraint Roberts

16 November 2013
14:00

| (BP) Worthing Raiders | 34 – 22 | Cinderford |

Roundstone Lane
Attendance: 682
Referee: Richard Kelly

16 November 2013
15:00

| (BP) Blackheath | 18 – 25 | Richmond |

Rectory Field
Attendance: 565
Referee: Shane Lewis

16 November 2013
15:00

| (BP) Fylde | 42 – 15 | Hull Ionians |

Woodlands Memorial Ground
Attendance: 575
Referee: Andy Rawson

16 November 2013
15:00

| Old Albanian | 27 – 27 | Blaydon (BP) |

Woollam Playing Fields
Attendance: 190
Referee: Fergus Kirkby

=== Round 12 ===
23 November 2013
14:00

| (BP) Blaydon | 51 – 14 | Wharfedale |

Crow Trees
Attendance: 456
Referee: Wayne Falla

23 November 2013
14:00

| (BP) Hull Ionions | 24 – 26 | Loughborough Students (BP) |

Brantingham Park
Attendance: 205
Referee: Andrew Jackson

23 November 2013
14:30

| (BP) Cinderford | 39 – 32 | Fylde (2BP) |

Dockham Road
Attendance: 246
Referee: David Procter

23 November 2013
14:30

| (BP) Rosslyn Park | 38 – 31 | Esher (BP) |

The Rock
Attendance: 937
Referee: Andrew Taylorson

23 November 2013
15:00

| (BP) Coventry | 36 – 34 | Tynedale (2BP) |

Butts Park Arena
Attendance: 1,102
Referee: Fergus Kirby

23 November 2013
15:00

| Henley Hawks | 27 – 11 | Blackheath |

Dry Leas
Attendance: 520
Referee: Rob Price

23 November 2013
15:00

| Old Albanian | 17 – 33 | Doncaster Knights (BP) |

Woollam Playing Fields
Attendance: 310
Referee: Phil Davies

23 November 2013
15:00

| (2BP) Richmond | 34 – 39 | Worthing Raiders (BP) |

Athletic Ground
Attendance: 767
Referee: Thomas Davies

=== Round 13 ===
30 November 2013
14:00

| (BP) Loughborough Students | 36 – 28 | Cinderford |

Loughborough University Stadium
Attendance: 350
Referee: Marcus Caton

30 November 2013
14:00

| (BP) Tynedale | 40 – 29 | Hull Ionians (BP) |

Tynedale Park
Attendance: 275
Referee: Wayne Falla

30 November 2013
14:00

| (BP) Wharfedale | 32 – 29 | Old Albanians (2BP) |

The Avenue
Attendance: 421
Referee: David Procter

30 November 2013
14:00

| (2BP) Worthing Raiders | 27 – 32 | Henley Hawks (BP) |

Roundstone Lane
Attendance: 827
Referee: Shane Lewis

30 November 2013
14:30

| Doncaster Knights | 24 – 17 | Rosslyn Park |

Castle Park
Attendance: 1,107
Referee: Craig Maxwell-Keys

30 November 2013
15:00

| Blackheath | 20 – 20 | Blaydon |

Rectory Field
Attendance: 795
Referee: James Sullivan

30 November 2013
15:00

| (BP) Esher | 14 – 20 | Coventry |

Molesey Road
Attendance: 787
Referee: Andrew Jackson

30 November 2013
15:00

| (BP) Fylde | 34 – 26 | Richmond |

Woodlands Memorial Ground
Attendance: 785
Referee: Llyr Apgeraint-Roberts

=== Round 14 ===
7 December 2013
14:00

| (BP) Blaydon | 45 – 14 | Worthing Raiders |

Crow Trees
Attendance: 175
Referee: Andrew Ransom

7 December 2013
14:00

| Henley Hawks | 21 – 32 | Fylde (BP) |

Dry Leas
Attendance: 445
Referee: Fergis Kirby

7 December 2013
14:00

| (BP) Hull Ionians | 25 – 47 | Esher (BP) |

Brantingham Park
Attendance: 215
Referee: Andrew Taylorson

7 December 2013
14:00

| Wharfedale | 19 – 17 | Doncaster Knights (BP) |

The Avenue
Attendance: 783
Referee: Llyr Apgeraint Roberts

7 December 2013
14:30

| Cinderford | 28 – 27 | Tynedale (2BP) |

Dockham Road
Attendance: 190
Referee: Gareth John

7 December 2013
15:00

| (BP) Coventry | 18 – 19 | Rosslyn Park |

Butts Park Arena
Attendance: 1,601
Referee: Andrew Small

7 December 2013
15:00

| (BP) Old Albanian | 53 – 16 | Blackheath |

Woollam Playing Fields
Attendance: 310
Referee: Tom Davis

7 December 2013
15:00

| (BP) Richmond | 33 – 10 | Loughborough Students |

Athletic Ground
Attendance: 604
Referee: Richard Kelly

=== Round 15 ===
14 December 2013
14:00

| Loughborough Students | 16 – 10 | Henley Hawks (BP) |

Loughborough University Stadium
Attendance: 200
Referee: Tom Davis

14 December 2013
14:00

| Tynedale | 24 – 32 | Richmond (BP) |

Tynedale Park
Attendance: 350
Referee: Graeme Wells

14 December 2013
14:00

| (2BP) Worthing Raiders | 31 – 32 | Old Albanian |

Roundstone Lane
Attendance: 792
Referee: Robert Warburton

14 December 2013
14:30

| (BP) Doncaster Knights | 39 – 30 | Coventry |

Castle Park
Attendance: 1,068
Referee: John Meredith

14 December 2013
15:00

| (BP) Blackheath | 20 – 23 | Wharfedale |

Rectory Field
Attendance: 616
Referee: Nick Cockburn

14 December 2013
15:00

| (BP) Esher | 36 – 5 | Cinderford |

Molesey Road
Attendance: 837
Referee: Richard Kelly

14 December 2013
15:00

| Fylde | 9 – 5 | Blaydon (BP) |

Woodlands Memorial Ground
Attendance: 675
Referee: Marcus Catton

14 December 2013
15:00

| (BP) Rosslyn Park | 48 – 0 | Hull Ionians |

The Rock
Attendance: 506
Referee: Matthew O'Grady

=== Round 16 ===
21 December 2013
14:00

| (BP) Blaydon | 51 – 7 | Tynedale |

Crow Trees
Attendance: 645
Referee: Andrew Taylorson

21 December 2013
14:00

| Wharfedale | 26 – 36 | Fylde (BP) |

The Avenue
Attendance: 893
Referee: Wayne Fella

21 December 2013
14:30

| (2BP) Cinderford | 29 – 31 | Coventry (BP) |

Dockham Road
Attendance: 700
Referee: Shane Lewis

21 December 2013
14:30

| (BP) Doncaster Knights | 46 – 8 | Hull Ionians |

Castle Park
Attendance: 1,425
Referee: Marcus Caton

21 December 2013
15:00

| Blackheath | 16 – 14 | Worthing Raiders (BP) |

Rectory Field
Attendance: 563
Referee: Richard Kelly

21 December 2013
15:00

| (BP) Henley Hawks | 8 – 13 | Esher |

Dry Leas
Attendance: 505
Referee: Philip Davies

21 December 2013
15:00

| (BP) Old Albanian | 33 – 16 | Loughborough Students |

Loughborough University Stadium
Attendance: 351
Referee: David Procter

21 December 2013
15:00

| Richmond | 7 – 28 | Rosslyn Park |

Athletic Ground
Attendance: 789
Referee: Dean Richards

=== Round 17 ===
4 January 2014
14:00

| Esher | 24 – 20 | Blaydon (BP) |

Molesey Road
Attendance: 465
Referee: Shane Lewis

4 January 2014
14:00

| Hull Ionians | 11 – 23 | Cinderford |

Brantingham Park
Attendance: 355
Referee: Andrew RAwson

4 January 2014
14:00

| Loughborough Students | 7 – 27 | Wharfedale |

Loughborough University Stadium
Attendance: 120
Referee: Llyr ApGeraint Roberts

4 January 2014
14:00

| (BP) Tynedale | 34 – 13 | Old Albanian |

Tynedale Park
Attendance: 350
Referee: Andrew Jackson

4 January 2014
14:00

| (BP) Worthing Raiders | 17 – 21 | Doncaster Knights |

Roundstone Lane
Attendance: 578
Referee: Simon Harding

4 January 2014
14:30

| Rosslyn Park | 28 – 6 | Henley Hawks |

The Rock
Attendance: 600
Referee: Fergus Kirby

4 January 2014
15:00

| Coventry | P – P | Richmond |

Butts Park Arena

4 January 2014
15:00

| (BP) Fylde | 33 – 17 | Blackheath |

Woodlands Memorial Ground
Attendance: 750
Referee: Andrew Taylorson

=== Round 18 ===
11 January 2014
14:00

| Blaydon | 19 – 18 | Rosslyn Park (BP) |

Crow Trees
Attendance: 338
Referee: Darren Gamage

11 January 2014
14:00

| Wharfedale | 14 – 27 | Tynedale (BP) |

The Avenue
Attendance: 589
Referee: Marcus Caton

11 January 2014
14:00

| (BP) Worthing Raiders | 25 – 17 | Fylde |

Roundstone Lane
Attendance: 652
Referee: Philip Davies

11 January 2014
14:30

| (BP) Doncaster Knights | 62 – 28 | Cinderford (BP) |

Castle Park
Attendance: 1,097
Referee: Wayne Fella

11 January 2014
15:00

| (BP) Blackheath | 28 – 28 | Loughborough Students |

Rectory Field
Attendance: 427
Referee: Robert Warburton

11 January 2014
15:00

| Henley Hawks | 10 – 18 | Coventry |

Dry Leas
Attendance: 530
Referee: Thomas Davis

11 January 2014
15:00

| (BP) Old Albanian | 31 – 8 | Esher |

Woollam Playing Fields
Attendance: 353
Referee: Fergus Kirby

11 January 2014
15:00

| (BP) Richmond | 33 – 24 | Hull Ionians |

Athletic Ground
Attendance: 437
Referee: Richard Kelly

=== Round 19 ===
18 January 2014
14:00

| Hull Ionians | 14 – 28 | Henley Hawks (BP) |

Brantingham Park
Attendance: 255
Referee: Karl Kirkpatrick

18 January 2014
14:00

| Loughborough Students | 28 – 20 | Worthing Raiders |

Loughborough University Stadium
Attendance: 120
Referee: James Sullivan

18 January 2014
14:00

| (BP) Tynedale | 31 – 10 | Blackheath |

Tynedale Park
Attendance: 450
Referee: Wayne Fella

18 January 2014
14:30

| Cinderford | P – P | Richmond |

Dockham Road

18 January 2014
14:30

| (BP) Rosslyn Park | 37 – 13 | Old Albanian |

The Rock
Attendance: 572
Referee: Llyr Apgeraint-Roberts

18 January 2014
15:00

| Coventry | 15 – 37 | Blaydon (BP) |

Butts Park Arena
Attendance: 1,302
Referee: Marcus Caton

18 January 2014
15:00

| (BP) Esher | 26 – 28 | Wharfedale (BP) |

Molesey Road
Attendance: 567
Referee: Thomas Davis

18 January 2014
15:00

| Fylde | 25 – 17 | Doncaster Knights |

Woodlands Memorial Ground
Attendance: 1,056
Referee: Tom Foley

=== Round 20 ===
25 January 2014
14:00

| Blaydon | 14 – 14 | Hull Ionions |

Brantingham Park
Attendance: 217
Referee: Nicholas Cockburn

25 January 2014
14:00

| Wharfedale | 3 – 45 | Rosslyn Park (BP) |

The Avenue
Attendance: 617
Referee: David Procter

25 January 2014
14:00

| (BP) Worthing Raiders | 29 – 19 | Tynedale |

Roundstone Lane
Attendance: 714
Referee: Richard Kelly

25 January 2014
14:30

| (BP) Doncaster Knights | 27 – 9 | Richmond |

Castle Park
Attendance: 1,116
Referee: Philip Davies

25 January 2014
15:00

| (BP) Blackheath | 38 – 10 | Esher |

Rectory Field
Attendance: 887
Referee: Nicholas Cockburn

25 January 2014
15:00

| (BP) Fylde | 56 – 22 | Loughborough Students |

Woodlands Memorial Park
Attendance: 625
Referee: Andrew Rawson

25 January 2014
15:00

| (BP) Henley Hawks | 5 – 12 | Cinderford |

Dry Leas
Attendance: 505
Referee: Robert Warburton

25 January 2014
15:00

| Old Albanian | 25 – 13 | Coventry |

Woollam Playing Fields
Attendance: 410
Referee: Matthew O'Grady

=== Round 21 ===
1 February 2014
14:00

| Hull Ionians | 7 – 53 | Old Albanian (BP) |

Brantingham Park
Attendance: 155
Referee: Marcus Caton

1 February 2014
14:00

| Loughborough Students | 12 – 31 | Doncaster Knights (BP) |

Loughborough University Stadium
Attendance: 1,100
Referee: Tom Davis

1 February 2014
14:00

| (BP) Tynedale | 26 – 7 | Fylde |

Tynedale Park
Attendance: 325
Referee: Andrew Jackson

1 February 2014
14:30

| Cinderford | P – P | Blaydon |

Dockham Road

1 February 2014
15:00

| Coventry | 22 – 10 | Wharfedale |

Butts Park Arena
Attendance: 917
Referee: Llyr Apgeraint-Roberts

1 February 2014
15:00

| (BP) Esher | 36 – 19 | Worthing Raiders |

Molesey Road
Attendance: 563
Referee: Matthew O'Grady

1 February 2014
15:00

| Richmond | 25 – 10 | Henley Hawks |

Athletic Ground
Attendance: 499
Referee: Fergus Kirby

1 February 2014
15:00

| (BP) Rosslyn Park | 12 – 15 | Blackheath |

The Rock
Attendance: 720
Referee: Richard Kelly

=== Round 22 ===
8 February 2014
14:00

| (2BP) Blaydon | 26 – 31 | Richmond (BP) |

Crow Trees
Attendance: 217
Referee: Wayne Fella

8 February 2014
14:00

| Loughborough Students | P – P | Tynedale |

Loughborough University Stadium

8 February 2014
14:00

| Wharfedale | 7 – 17 | Hull Ionians |

The Avenue
Attendance: 536
Referee: Andrew Rawson

8 February 2014
14:00

| Worthing Raiders | 0 – 44 | Rosslyn Park (BP) |

Roundstone Lane
Attendance: 495
Referee: Fergus Kirby

8 February 2014
14:30

| (BP) Doncaster Knights | 36 – 10 | Henley Hawks |

Castle Park
Attendance: 1,217
Referee: Andrew Taylorson

8 February 2014
15:00

| Blackheath | 24 – 6 | Coventry |

Rectory Field
Attendance: 719
Referee: Robert Warburton

8 February 2014
15:00

| (BP) Fylde | 33 – 7 | Esher |

Woodlands Memorial Ground
Attendance: 725
Referee: Llyr Ap Geraint-Roberts

8 February 2014
15:00

| Old Albanian | P – P | Cinderford |

Woollam Playing Fields

=== Round 23 ===
15 February 2014
14:00

| Hull Ionians | 12 – 36 | Blackheath (BP) |

Brantingham Park
Attendance: 221
Referee: Andrew Taylorson

15 February 2014
14:15

| (2BP) Tynedale | 26 – 29 | Doncaster Knights |

Tynedale Park
Attendance: 382
Referee: Wayne Fella

15 February 2014
14:30

| Cinderford | P – P | Wharfedale |

Dockham Road

15 February 2014
14:30

| Henley Hawks | P – P | Blaydon |

Dry Leas

15 February 2014
15:00

| (BP) Coventry | 47 – 7 | Worthing Raiders |

Butts Park Arena
Attendance: 931
Referee: Marcus Caton

15 February 2014
15:00

| Esher | 24 – 21 | Loughborough Students (BP) |

Molesey Road
Attendance: 523
Referee: James Sullivan

15 February 2014
15:00

| Richmond | 17 – 8 | Old Albanian |

Athletic Ground
Attendance: 478
Referee: Nicholas Cockburn

15 February 2014
15:00

| Rosslyn Park | 16 – 7 | Fylde |

The Rock
Attendance: 680
Referee: Philip Davies

=== Postponed matches (1) ===
22 February 2014
14:00

| Coventry | 20 – 17 | Richmond (BP) |

Butts Park Arena
Attendance: 946
Referee: Shane Lewis

22 February 2014
14:00

| Loughborough Students | 10 – 19 | Tynedale |

Loughborough University Stadium
Attendance: 154
Referee: Richard Kelly

22 February 2014
14:30

| (BP) Cinderford | 32 – 13 | Blaydon |

Dockham Road
Attendance: 195
Referee: Ian Tempest

=== Round 24 ===
1 March 2014
14:00

| (BP) Loughborough Students | 17 – 18 | Rosslyn Park |

Loughborough University Stadium
Attendance: 102
Referee: Shane Lewis

1 March 2014
14:30

| (BP) Doncaster Knights | 24 – 19 | Blaydon (BP) |

Castle Park
Attendance: 1,136
Referee: Marcus Caton

1 March 2014
15:00

| (BP) Blackheath | 32 – 24 | Cinderford |

Rectory Field
Attendance: 714
Referee: Fergus Kirby

1 March 2014
15:00

| Fylde | 15 – 36 | Coventry (BP) |

Woodlands Memorial Ground
Attendance: 762
Referee: Tom Davies

1 March 2014
15:00

| Old Albanian | 19 – 10 | Henley Hawks |

Woollam Playing Fields
Attendance: 325
Referee: Jamie Leahy

1 March 2014
15:00

| (BP) Tynedale | 27 – 5 | Esher |

Tyndale Park
Attendance: 450
Referee: Karl Kirkpatrick

1 March 2014
15:00

| (BP) Wharfedale | 28 – 34 | Richmond (BP) |

The Avenue
Attendance: 512
Referee: Rob Warburton

1 March 2014
15:00

| (BP) Worthing Raiders | 34 – 17 | Hull Ionians |

Roundstone Lane
Attendance: 772
Referee: Richard Kelly

=== Round 25 ===
8 March 2014
14:00

| (BP) Hull Ionians | 37 – 24 | Fylde (BP) |

Brantingham Park
Attendance: 200
Referee: Wayne Falla

8 March 2014
14:30

| Blaydon | 27 – 34 | Old Albanian (BP) |

Crow Trees
Attendance: 122
Referee: Matthew O'Grady

8 March 2014
14:30

| (BP) Cinderford | 32 – 31 | Worthing Raiders (2BP) |

Dockham Road
Attendance: 295
Referee: Marcus Caton

8 March 2014
15:00

| (BP) Coventry | 33 – 14 | Loughborough Students |

Butts Park Arena
Attendance: 1,054
Referee: Fergus Kirby

8 March 2014
15:00

| Esher | 14 – 23 | Doncaster Knights |

Molesey Road
Attendance: 564
Referee: Phil Davis

8 March 2014
15:00

| (BP) Henley Hawks | 52 – 22 | Wharfedale |

Dry Leas
Attendance: 440
Referee: Thomas Davis

8 March 2014
15:00

| (BP) Richmond | 31 – 31 | Blackheath (BP) |

Athletic Ground
Attendance: 1,537
Referee: Shane Lewis

- The above match was the 150th anniversary of rugby's oldest fixture.

8 March 2014
15:00

| Rosslyn Park | 31 – 11 | Tynedale |

The Rock
Attendance: 540
Referee: Richard Kelly

=== Postponed matches (2) ===
15 March 2014
14:30

| (BP) Cinderford | 28 – 29 | Richmond (BP) |

Dockham Road
Attendance: 322
Referee: Philip Davies

15 March 2014
14:30

| Henley Hawks | 23 – 13 | Blaydon |

Dry Leas
Attendance: 313
Referee: Llyr ApGeraint Roberts

=== Round 26 ===
22 March 2014
14:00

| Loughborough Students | 25 – 15 | Hull Ionians |

Loughborough University Stadium
Attendance: 100
Referee: Karl Kirkpatrick

22 March 2014
14:30

| Doncaster Knights | 25 – 10 | Old Albanian |

Castle Park
Attendance: 1,385
Referee: Llyr ApGeraint-Roberts

22 March 2014
15:00

| Blackheath | 22 – 18 | Henley Hawks (BP) |

Rectory Field
Attendance: 648
Referee: Robert Warburton

22 March 2014
15:00

| Esher | 30 – 38 | Rosslyn Park (BP) |

Molesey Road
Attendance: 986
Referee: John Meredith

22 March 2014
15:00

| (BP) Fylde | 35 – 29 | Cinderford (2BP) |

Woodlands Memorial Ground
Attendance: 535
Referee: Andrew Taylorson

22 March 2014
15:00

| (BP) Tynedale | 36 – 35 | Coventry (2BP) |

Tynedale Park
Attendance: 500
Referee: Jamie Leahy

22 March 2014
15:00

| Wharfedale | 13 – 37 | Blaydon (BP) |

The Avenue
Attendance: 473
Referee: David Procter

22 March 2014
15:00

| (BP) Worthing Raiders | 28 – 36 | Richmond (BP) |

Roundstone Lane
Attendance: 1,012
Referee: Philip Davies

=== Round 27 ===
29 March 2014
14:30

| Blaydon | 22 – 16 | Blackheath (BP) |

Crow Trees
Attendance: 245
Referee: Wayne Fella

29 March 2014
14:30

| Cinderford | 22 – 19 | Loughborough Students (BP) |

Dockham Road
Attendance: 351
Referee: Jamie Leahy

29 March 2014
15:00

| (BP) Coventry | 43 – 0 | Esher |

Butts Park Arena
Attendance: 1,272
Referee: Llyr ApGeraint-Roberts

29 March 2014
15:00

| Henley Hawks | 21 – 16 | Worthing Raiders (BP) |

Dry Leas
Attendance: 665
Referee: Robert Price

29 March 2014
15:00

| Hull Ionians | 24 – 45 | Tynedale (BP) |

Brantingham Park
Attendance: 221
Referee: Andrew Rawson

29 March 2014
15:00

| (2BP) Old Albanian | 25 – 28 | Wharfedale |

Woollam Playing Fields
Attendance: 315
Referee: Gareth Holsgrove

29 March 2014
15:00

| (BP) Richmond | 36 – 0 | Fylde |

Athletic Ground
Attendance: 408
Referee: Robert Warburton

29 March 2014
15:00

| Rosslyn Park | 21 – 18 | Doncaster Knights (BP) |

The Rock
Attendance: 1,756
Referee: Greg Macdonald

=== Round 28 ===
5 April 2014
14:00

| Loughborough Students | 22 – 19 | Richmond (BP) |

Loughborough University Stadium
Attendance: 450
Referee: Andrew Taylorson

5 April 2014
14:30

| (BP) Doncaster Knights | 57 – 17 | Wharfedale |

Castle Park
Attendance: 1,588
Referee: Andrew Taylorson

5 April 2014
15:00

| (BP) Blackheath | 27 – 10 | Old Albanian |

Rectory Field
Attendance: 1,027
Referee: Thomas Davies

5 April 2014
15:00

| (BP) Esher | 52 – 3 | Hull Ionians |

Molesey Road
Attendance: 547
Referee: Matthew O'Grady

5 April 2014
15:00

| (BP) Fylde | 42 – 22 | Henley Hawks |

Woodlands Memorial Ground
Attendance: 561
Referee: Andrew Procter

5 April 2014
15:00

| (BP) Rosslyn Park | 32 – 10 | Coventry |

The Rock
Attendance: 600
Referee: Ian Tempest

5 April 2014
15:00

| (BP) Tynedale | 24 – 24 | Cinderford (BP) |

Tynedale Park
Attendance: 620
Referee: Marcus Caton

5 April 2014
15:00

| {BP} Worthing Raiders | 24 – 32 | Blaydon (BP) |

Roundstone Lane
Attendance: 630
Referee: Fergus Kirby

=== Round 29 ===
12 April 2014
14:30

| Blaydon | 15 – 14 | Fylde (BP) |

Crow Fields
Attendance: 262
Referee: Jamie Leahy

12 April 2014
14:30

| (BP) Cinderford | 32 – 46 | Esher (BP) |

Dockham Road
Attendance: 341
Referee: Shane Lewis

12 April 2014
15:00

| (BP) Coventry | 17 – 18 | Doncaster Knights |

Butts Park Arena
Attendance: 1,506
Referee: Craig Maxwell-Keys

12 April 2014
15:00

| Henley Hawks | 22 – 11 | Loughborough Students |

Dry Leas
Attendance: 615
Referee: Rob Warburton

12 April 2014
15:00

| Hull Ionians | 12 – 60 | Rosslyn Park (BP) |

Brantingham Park
Attendance: 248
Referee: Llyr ApGeraint-Roberts

12 April 2014
15:00

| (BP) Old Albanian | 33 – 20 | Worthing Raiders |

Woollam Playing Fields
Attendance: 420
Referee: Richard Kelly

12 April 2014
15:00

| (BP) Richmond | 49 – 21 | Tynedale |

Athletic Ground
Attendance: 723
Referee: Gareth Holsgrove

12 April 2014
15:00

| (BP) Wharfedale | 19 – 24 | Blackheath (BP) |

The Avenue
Attendance: 585
Referee: Andrew Taylorson

=== Postponed match (3) ===
19 April 2014
15:00

| Old Albanian | 9 – 17 | Cinderford |

Woollam Playing Fields
Attendance: 313
Referee: Alexis Manley

=== Round 30 ===
26 April 2014
15:00

| Blackheath | 20 – 38 | Doncaster Knights (BP) |

Rectory Field
Attendance: 1,352
Referee: Richard Hill

26 April 2014
15:00

| (BP) Coventry | 67 – 14 | Hull Ionians |

Butts Bank Arena
Attendance: 1,283
Referee: Simon Harding

26 April 2014
15:00

| (BP) Esher | 31 – 17 | Richmond |

Molesey Road
Attendance: 1,081
Referee: Steve Lee

26 April 2014
15:00

| (BP) Fylde | 50 – 30 | Old Albanian (BP) |

Woodlands Memorial Ground
Attendance: 823
Referee: Veryan Boscawen

26 April 2014
15:00

| (BP) Loughborough Students | 29 – 10 | Blaydon |

Loughborough University Stadium
Attendance: 500
Referee: Shane Lewis

26 April 2014
15:00

| (BP) Rosslyn Park | 52 – 17 | Cinderford |

The Rock
Attendance: 621
Referee: Andrew Taylorson

26 April 2014
15:00

| Tynedale | 14 – 14 | Henley Hawks |

Tynedale Park
Attendance: 900
Referee: Llyr ApGerraint-Roberts

26 April 2014
15:00

| (2BP) Worthing Raiders | 34 – 38 | Wharfedale (BP) |

Roundstone Lane
Attendance: 817
Referee: Tom Davis

=== Postponed match (4) ===
3 May 2014
14:00

| (BP) Cinderford | 55 – 26 | Wharfedale (BP) |

Dockham Road
Attendance: 189
Referee: Fergus Kirby

== Season records ==
=== Team ===
Largest home win — 53 pts

67 – 14 Coventry v Hull Ionians on 26 April

Largest away win — 48 pts

12 – 60 Rosslyn Park at Hull Ionians on 12 April

Most points scored — 67pts

67 – 14 Coventry v Hull Ionians on 26 April

Most points scored away from home — 60 pts

12 – 60 Rosslyn Park at Hull Ionians on 12 April

Most tries in a match — 10

63 – 21 Coventry v Blackheath on 26 October
12 – 60 Rosslyn Park at Hull Ionians on 12 April
67 – 14 Coventry v Hull Ionians on 26 April

Most conversions in a match — 8

Esher home to Tynedale on 9 November
Fylde home to Loughborough Students on 26 January

Most penalties in a match — 7

Wharfdale v Loughborough Students on 21 September
Wharfdale at Tynedale on 28 September

Most drop goals in a match — 1

N/A - multiple teams

=== Player ===
Most points in a match — 28 pts

Clifford Hodgson for Coventry at home to Blackheath on 26 October

Most tries in a match — 4

Ben Frankland for Tynedale home to Blackheath on 18 January
Howe for Rosslyn Park at Hull Ionians on 12 April

Most conversions in a match — 8

Luke Daniels for Esher home to Tynedale on 9 November

Most penalties in a match — 7

Tom Barrett for Wharfdale at home to Loughborough Students on 21 September
Tom Barrett for Wharfdale at Tynedale on 28 September

Most drop goals in a match — 1

N/A - multiple players

Fastest try from kick-off

7.24 seconds by Tyson Lewis for Doncaster Knights at Old Albanians – the fastest ever try by a professional rugby union player. The try was originally timed at 8.13 seconds, but Guinness World Records recorded it as 7.24 seconds. The previous record was 8.28 seconds by Lee Blackett for Leeds Carnegie at home to Newcastle Falcons in the 2007–08 English Premiership.

=== Attendances ===
Highest — 1,756

Rosslyn Park at home to Doncaster Knights on 29 March 2014

Lowest — 100

Loughborough Students at home to Hull Ionians on 22 March 2014

Highest Average Attendance — 1,198

Coventry

Lowest Average Attendance — 283

Hull Ionians

== Total Season Attendances ==
| Club | Total | Average | Highest | Lowest | % Capacity |
|---|---|---|---|---|---|
| Blackheath | 11,088 | 739 | 1,352 | 427 | 21% |
| Blaydon | 4,429 | 295 | 645 | 122 | 15% |
| Cinderford | 4,794 | 320 | 700 | 189 | 13% |
| Coventry | 17,969 | 1,198 | 1,601 | 917 | 30% |
| Doncaster Knights | 16,648 | 1,110 | 1,588 | 772 | 36% |
| Esher | 9,651 | 643 | 1,081 | 325 | 21% |
| Fylde | 10,693 | 713 | 1,056 | 535 | 10% |
| Henley Hawks | 7,823 | 522 | 745 | 245 | 13% |
| Hull Ionians | 4,245 | 283 | 550 | 155 | 19% |
| Loughborough Students | 5,160 | 344 | 1,100 | 100 | 11% |
| Old Albanian | 4,848 | 323 | 420 | 190 | 32% |
| Richmond | 9,398 | 627 | 1,537 | 275 | 14% |
| Rosslyn Park | 9,851 | 657 | 1,756 | 657 | 33% |
| Tynedale | 6,727 | 448 | 900 | 250 | 22% |
| Wharfedale | 9,340 | 623 | 893 | 421 | 31% |
| Worthing Raiders | 11,321 | 755 | 1,045 | 495 | 50% |

== Leading scorers ==
=== Leading points scorers ===
| Rank | Player | Team | Points |
|---|---|---|---|
| 1 | (South Africa) Cliff Hodgson | Coventry | 374 |
| 2 | (England) Tom Barrett | Wharfedale | 343 |
| 3 | (England) Scott Sneddon | Rosslyn Park | 281 |
| 4 | (England) Chris Johnson | Fylde | 272 |
| 5 | (England) Luke Daniels | Esher | 267 |
| 6 | (England) Lawrence Rayner | Old Albanian | 243 |
| 7 | (Scotland) Dougie Flockhart | Doncaster Knights | 238 |

=== Top try scorers ===
| Rank | Player | Team | Tries |
|---|---|---|---|
| 1 | (England) Tyson Lewis | Doncaster Knights | 22 |
| 2 | (England) David Allen | Blackheath | 20 |
| 2 | (England) Oliver Brennand | Fylde | 20 |
| 2 | (England) Matt Clark | Doncaster Knights | 20 |
| 5 | (England) Ben Frankland | Tynedale | 18 |
| 5 | (England) Alexander Nielsen | Worthing Raiders | 18 |
| 5 | (England) Jack Pons | Loughborough Students | 18 |
