= Tom Kessell =

English rugby union player

- Born: 21 February 1990 (age 36) Truro
- Height: 1.83 m (6 ft 0 in)
- Weight: 90 kg (14 st 2 lb; 200 lb)

Rugby union career
- Position: Scrum-half
Senior career
Years	Team	Apps	(Points)
2011–2015	Cornish Pirates	54	(45)
2015–2018	Northampton Saints	22	(15)
2018–2020	Coventry	41	(40)
2020–2021	Bristol Bears	2	(0)
2021–	Cornish Pirates		
- Correct as of 10 June 2021

Tom Kessell (born 21 February 1990) is a professional rugby union player for the Cornish Pirates in the RFU Championship.

== Career ==
Playing at scrum-half, Kessell first began his rugby at the Cornish Pirates, as a youngster in 1995 before signing a professional contract in 2011. Named as the Championship Player of the Season for the 2014–15 season, Kessell then made the switch to Aviva Premiership rugby and joined Northampton Saints in 2015. The scrum-half became a regular in the second team, the Northampton Wanderers and helped them to lift the Aviva 'A' League trophy after defeating Gloucester United in the final at Franklin's Gardens in 2017. On 25 June 2018 Kessell left Northampton Saints to return to the Championship with Coventry from, the 2018–19 season.

He signed a one-year deal with Bristol Bears for the 2020–21 season. He had previously signed a short-term deal for the conclusion of the 2019–20 season.

On 1 June 2021, Kessell returns to his hometown club Cornish Pirates in the RFU Championship ahead of the 2021–22 season.
