= Ollie Hayes =

English rugby union player

- Born: Oliver Thomas Hayes; 2 April 1990 (age 36)age =35 Bath, Somerset, England
- Height: 1.83 m (6 ft 0 in)
- Weight: 102 kg (16 st 1 lb)
- School: Ralph Allen (Bath)
- Occupation: Personal Trainer

Rugby union career
- Position: Hooker
- Current team: Oldfield Oldboys (Head Coach)
Youth career
- 2006 - 2008: Bath Academy
Senior career
Years	Team	Apps	(Points)
- Bristol Bears
–	Worcester Warriors		
–	Yorkshire Carnegie		
International career
Years	Team	Apps	(Points)
2006	England U16	3	(3)
Coaching career
- Years: Team
- Oldfield Oldboys

Ollie Hayes (born 2 April 1990) is an English rugby union player for Bristol Rugby. Having started his career at Bath Academy he moved to Bristol Guinness Premiership in 2008. He made his Premiership debut in March 2009 against Bath. Ollie played 48 games and scored 20 points during his time with Bristol in both Guinness Premiership and English Championship (rugby union)|RFU Championship Worcester Warriors announced the mobile hookers signing in March 2011. Ollie arrived at Sixways with an existing injury and after a summer operation made his Warriors debut, in the Worcester Cavaliers 29–24 victory against Exeter United, 5 September 2011 at Sandy Park. He has played for England U18.

Hayes came off the bench to score Warriors' bonus-point try against Northampton Saints in September 2012, helping his side to their first try bonus-point since 2009.

On 1 June 2013 he resigned for Bristol Rugby after two years away from the club and now has over 70 appearances for the Bristol rugby. After a season back at Bristol he Signed for Yorkshire Carnegie on a 2-year contract.

He plays as a hooker. Ollie was forced to retired aged 25 due to an injury. He currently runs his own mobile Personal Training business in Bath
