= Latu Makaafi =

Tonga international rugby union player

- Born: Latu Makaafi; August 17, 1982 (age 44) Faleloa, Tonga
- Height: 1.85 m (6 ft 1 in)
- Weight: 107 kg (236 lb; 16 st 12 lb)

Rugby union career
- Position: Flanker
- Current team: Hull
Senior career
Years	Team	Apps	(Points)
2000-2006	Bradford & Bingley	39	(85)
2006-2008	Jersey		
2008-2009	Hull	20	(41)
2009-2011	Wharfedale	25	(60)
2011-2012	Doncaster	45	(25)
2012-2013	Rotherham	17	(0)
2013-2014	Jersey	18	(0)
2014-17	Doncaster	24	(45)
2017-	Coventry		
International career
Years	Team	Apps	(Points)
2003-	Tonga	1	(0)
–	Tonga u-21		

Latu Makaafi, also spelt as Latu Maka'afi, (born 1982) is a Tongan rugby union flanker and Number 8 who plays for Hull having previously been at Coventry.

== Rugby career ==
Makaafi started playing rugby in England in 2000 when he started playing for Bradford & Bingley RFC. In 2006, he signed for London 2 South club Jersey Reds, becoming the first professional player for Jersey after receiving a work permit from the States of Jersey Customs and Immigration Service. In 2008, Makaafi signed for Hull. In October 2008, he was suspended from playing rugby for 8 weeks by the Yorkshire Rugby Football Union after being sent off for punching. In 2009, Makaafi signed for Wharfedale R.U.F.C. In 2011, he left Wharfedale for Doncaster Knights. In leaving Wharfedale Makaafi recommended that fellow Tongan Talite Vaioleti would replace him at Wharfedale. In 2012, Makaafi moved to fellow RFU Championship team Rotherham Titans for the 2012–13 RFU Championship season as part of a mass exodus of players from Doncaster Knights. During his time at Rotherham Titans, Makaafi played as a guest player at his old club, Bradford & Bingley for a match between a Bradford Salem Select XV and Bradford Grammar School. In 2013, it was announced that Makaafi would return to Jersey for their 2013–14 season. Following a season at Jersey it was announced that Latu would be returning to Doncaster for the 2014–15 season. Late in the 2016–2017 season, it was announced by Coventry Rugby that he had signed for them for the 2017–2018 season from Doncaster.

=== International career ===
Makaafi has represented Tonga at a number of levels. He has represented the Tonga national under-20 rugby union team.

== Honours ==
Bradford & Bingley

- North Division 2 East champions: 2002-03
- North Division 1 champions: 2003-04
- National Division 3 North champions: 2005-06

Hull

- National League 3 north v midlands promotion playoff winners: 2008-09

Wharfedale

- Yorkshire Cup winners: 2010-11
