= James Percival (rugby union) =

English rugby union player

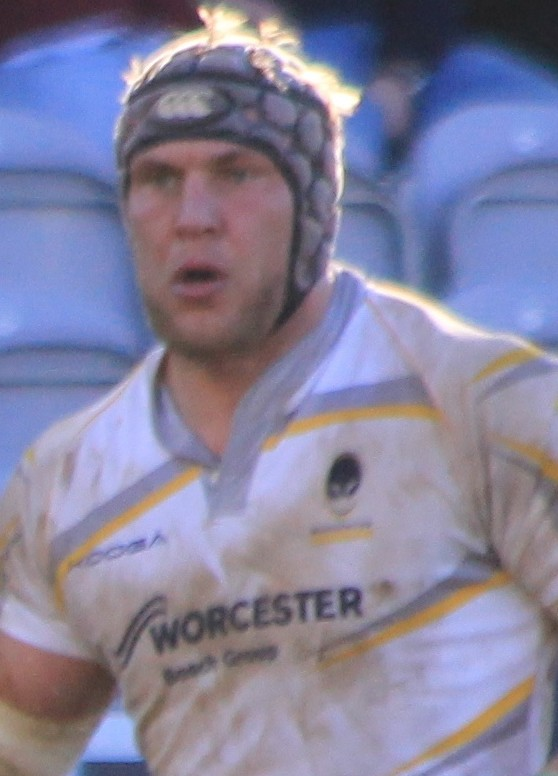
- Born: 9 November 1983 (age 43) Wordsley, West Midlands, England
- Height: 1.96 m (6 ft 5 in)
- Weight: 118 kg (18 st 8 lb)
- School: Wilden C of E First School/ Haybridge High School/ Worcester Sixth Form College
- University: Worcester University
- Occupation: Professional Rugby Player

Rugby union career
- Position: Lock
- Current team: Tarbes Pyrenees Rugby
Senior career
Years	Team	Apps	(Points)
2003–2005	Worcester Warriors	0	(0)
2005–2007	Northampton Saints	0	(0)
2006–2007	Bedford Blues(loan)	0	(0)
2007–2011	Harlequins	56	(10)
2011-2015	Worcester Warriors	84	(10)
2015-16	FC Grenoble	14	(5)
2016-	Tarbes Pyrenees Rugby	64	(5)
- Correct as of 28 December 2019 @ 16:19:21PM

James Percival (born 9 November 1983) is a rugby union player for Worcester Warriors in the RFU Championship after signing from Harlequins in the Summer of 2011. He primarily plays in the second-row.

Percival started at Worcester Warriors and gained International recognition as a member of Welsh Schools Under 18's and the England Under 21 team that won the 2004 Six Nations Grand Slam.

He joined Northampton Saints in the summer of 2005, but his progress was hampered after he suffered a broken neck in a friendly game against Munster. This injury ruled him out of action for the whole of the 2005–06 season.

Percival spent much of the 2006–07 campaign with a successful on-loan spell at Bedford Blues to get post injury game time.

Percival left Northampton Saints to join Harlequins in the summer of 2007 and participated in successful Guinness Premiership and Heineken Cup campaigns.

At the end of the 2010/2011 Aviva Premiership campaign, Percival left Harlequins and signed a 2-year contract which saw him return to the newly promoted Worcester Warriors, and the club where he started his career. Percival will stay with the Warriors until at least the end of the 2012/2013 season.
