= Mike Williams (rugby union) =

Zimbabwean rugby union player (born 1991)

- Full name: Michael Patrick Williams
- Born: 4 November 1991 (age 35) Bulawayo, Zimbabwe
- Height: 1.96 m (6 ft 5 in)
- Weight: 118 kg (18 st 8 lb; 260 lb)
- School: Christian Brothers College

Rugby union career
- Position: Lock/Flanker
Youth career
- 2010–2011: Sharks
- 2012: Blue Bulls
Amateur team(s)
Years	Team	Apps	(Points)
2012–2013	UP Tuks	16	(5)
Senior career
Years	Team	Apps	(Points)
2011	Sharks (Currie Cup)	0	(0)
2012–2013	Blue Bulls	3	(0)
2013–2015	Worcester Warriors	51	(10)
2015–2019	Leicester Tigers	80	(10)
2019-2022	Bath	51	(5)
2022-2023	Exeter Chiefs	7	(0)
2023	Leicester Tigers	5	(0)
2023-2025	Kurita Water Gush Akishima	14	(0)
- Correct as of 4 November 2023

Michael Patrick Williams (born 4 November 1991, in Bulawayo) is a Zimbabwean rugby player. He previously played for Leicester Tigers, Exeter Chiefs and Bath in Premiership Rugby, and for Worcester Warriors in the RFU Championship. He plays primarily as a lock but he can also play at flanker.

== Career ==
In 2010 and 2011, he captained the Sharks at age-group level in South Africa before playing with Tuks and the Pretoria-based Blue Bulls in 2012 and 2013. He enjoyed an outstanding 2013 Varsity Cup campaign, winning man of the match in the semi-final against UJ.

He moved to England to join Worcester Warriors on a two-year deal. On 1 February 2015, Williams would leave Worcester for Premiership Rugby side Leicester Tigers from the 2015–2016 season.

On 18 January 2019, Williams would leave Leicester to join Premiership rivals Bath from the 2019–20 season.

Williams received his first call up to the senior England squad by coach Eddie Jones on 1 August 2016 for a pre-season training squad. On 30 September 2016 he was named in the Test squad for the Autumn Internationals. However he was subsequently ruled out of the Tests after breaking his arm.

On 4 July- 2023, Williams re-signed with Leicester Tigers on a short term deal. He left the club in November.
