= Edward Siggery =

Welsh rugby union footballer

Ed Siggery
- Born: Edward David Siggery; 18 July 1991 (age 35) Carmarthen, Wales
- Height: 1.91 m (6 ft 3 in)
- Weight: 105 kg (231 lb; 16.5 st)

Rugby union career
- Position: Loose forward
Senior career
Years	Team	Apps	(Points)
2011–2012	London Irish	0	(0)

Edward David Siggery (born 18 July 1991) is a rugby union player at Pontypridd RFC in the Welsh Premiership, where he plays at flanker.

Born in Carmarthen, Siggery worked his way through the Scarlets Academy, winning caps in the process for Wales at under 16, under 18 and under 20 level.

He also turned out for the Scarlets region's three clubs, Llanelli RFC, Carmarthen Quins RFC and Llandovery RFC.

In 2010, Siggery enlisted to study at the University of Glamorgan in Pontypridd, enabling his move to Pontypridd RFC.

Siggery departed Pontypridd in 2011 following an offer from London Irish Academy.

Siggery returned to Pontypridd at the beginning of the 2012/13 season.
