= Alex Shaw (rugby union) =

English rugby union player

Alex Shaw (born 31 March 1987 (age 39) in Ajax, Kent, England) is a rugby union player for Doncaster Knights in the RFU Championship. He previously played for Sale Sharks in the Premiership and Nottingham in the RFU Championship. He plays in the back-row. Alex is now working in as a scout leader in Cheshire and in 2018 starred in the independent screen play 'Men in tight spaces'.
