= Talite Vaioleti =

Tonga international rugby union player

- Born: Talite Vaioleti; November 13, 1980 (age 46) Haveluloto, Tonga
- Height: 6 ft 4 in (1.93 m)
- Weight: 115 kg (254 lb)

Rugby union career
- Position: Lock
- Current team: Darlington Mowden Park R.F.C.
Youth career
- 2003-2005: Club Levengamalie
Senior career
Years	Team	Apps	(Points)
2005-2006	Royan		
2006-2007	Hertford		
2007-2010	Jersey		
2010-2011	Wharfedale.		
2011-2012	Rotherham		
2012-2013	Jersey		
2013-	Darlington Mowden Park R.F.C.		
International career
Years	Team	Apps	(Points)
2005-	Tonga	2	(2)
2005-	Tonga A		
2010	Barbarians	1	(10)

Talite Vaioleti (born 13 November 1980) is a Tongan rugby union player, born in Haveluloto, Tonga, who plays for National League 1 side, Darlington Mowden Park R.F.C. He is a utility player able to play as a Lock or in the Back Row.

== Career ==
Vaioleti started to play rugby for Club Levengamalie in 2003. After a club tour to New Zealand, he was persuaded to turn professional and in 2005, was selected to play for Tonga against France. While in France, he was approached to play club rugby in Europe. As a result of this, Vaioleti played one season with Royan in France. From there along with some fellow Tongan players, he moved to England to play for Hertford in 2006. In 2007, Vaioleti joined Jersey where he became captain and led them to two promotions and a game at Twickenham Stadium in London. In 2010, Vaioleti left Jersey to move to Wharfedale after a recommendation from fellow Tongan, Latu Makaafi. After a season, in 2011 he moved to Rotherham Titans where despite making 8 appearances for them in the RFU Championship, due to a lack of starts he moved back to Jersey, who had just been promoted to the RFU Championship, in 2012.

=== International career ===
Vaioleti has represented Tonga twice as well as appeared a number of times for Tonga A. In 2010 he received an invitation to represent The Barbarians under England national coach, Brian Ashton against a Forces XV where he scored two tries.

== Personal life ==
Vaioleti was married to a Jerseywoman named Catherine whom he met during his first stint at Jersey. Vaioleti is a member of the Church of Jesus Christ of Latter-day Saints. Between 2001 and 2003 he was a missionary in Australia. In 2011, he was interviewed by the BBC for a radio programme about the haka.
