= Val Rapava-Ruskin =

Val Rapava Ruskin
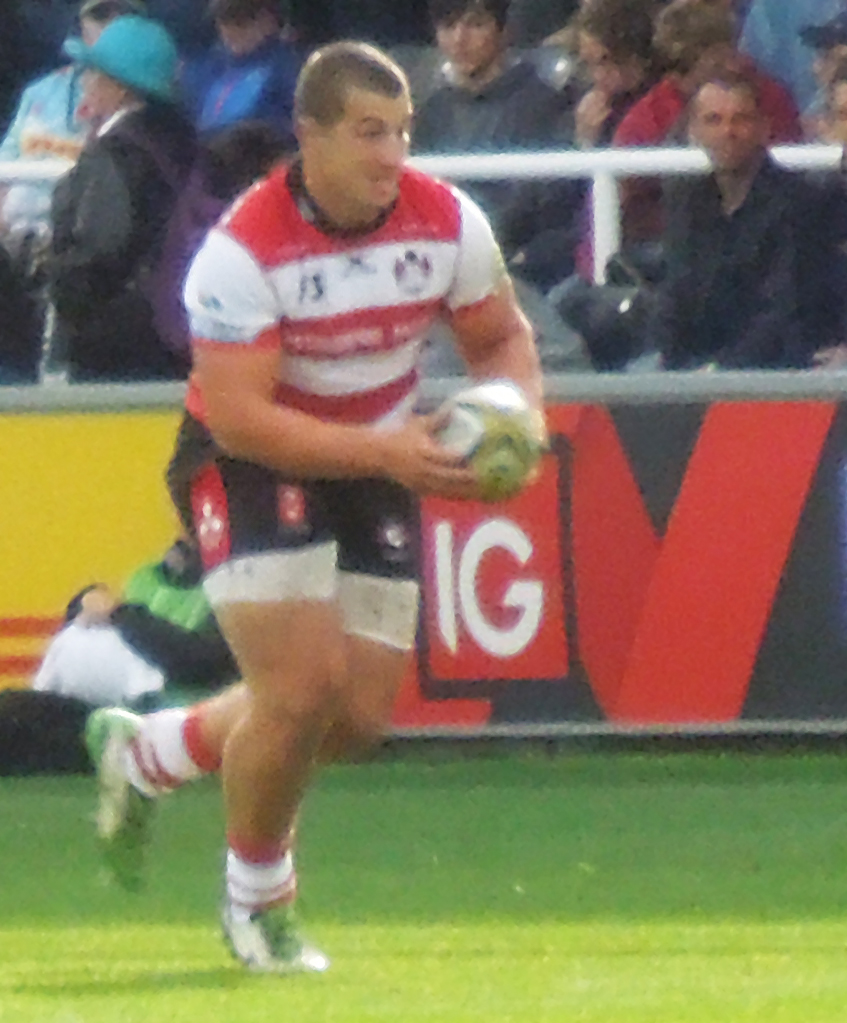
- Born: Val Rapava Ruskin; 12 October 1992 (age 34) Tbilisi, Georgia
- Height: 1.91 m (6 ft 3 in)
- Weight: 124 kg (19 st 7 lb; 273 lb)
- University: Regent's Business School London

Rugby union career
- Position: Loosehead Prop
- Current team: Gloucester
Youth career
- Blackheath
- 2011–2012: Western Province
- 2012–2013: Saracens
- 2013–2014: Toulon
Senior career
| Years | Team | Apps | (Points) |
| 2014–2017 | Worcester Warriors | 38 | (10) |
| 2017– | Gloucester | 131 | (90) |
- Correct as of 29 May 2026
International career
| Years | Team | Apps | (Points) |
| 2011 | Georgia U19 | | |

Val Rapava-Ruskin (born 12 October 1992) is an English rugby union player currently playing for Gloucester in the Premiership Rugby.

== Early career ==
Val Rapava Ruskin has been in many clubs around the world. He left his native Georgia when he was two years old and grew up in England. His first club was Blackheath. In 2011, he moved to South Africa and joined Western Province to play U19 Currie Cup. He captained Georgia U19 the same year. Then, he was back in England and played a few games for Saracens Storm in the A-League. In 2013, he moved to French giants Toulon, playing for their (U23) team

== Professional career ==
During his season with Toulon, Val Rapava Ruskin had a trial for Worcester Warriors. He made his first professional appearance for the club 20 September 2014 against Doncaster at just 21 years old. Since his debut, he has scored five tries in the RFU Championship, including two against Rotherham Titans in October 2014. On 10 January 2017, Ruskin left Worcester at Sixways to join local rivals Gloucester from the 2017–18 season.

In June 2019 he was one of four uncapped players named in England's preliminary World Cup training squad.

In the summer of 2023 he was named for the training squad of the England national rugby union team before the summer games and the 2023 Rugby World Cup.

== Career statistics ==
As of match played 26 December 2014.

| Club | Season | Championship | | | | B&I Cup | | | | Total | | | |
| Club | Season | Apps | Tries | Yel | Red | Apps | Tries | Yel | Red | Apps | Tries | Yel | Red |
|---|---|---|---|---|---|---|---|---|---|---|---|---|---|
| (England) Worcester Warriors | 2014–15 | 6 | 6 | 0 | 0 | 3 | 1 | 1 | 0 | 9 | 7 | 1 | 0 |
| Career total | | 6 | 6 | 0 | 0 | 3 | 1 | 1 | 0 | 9 | 7 | 1 | 0 |
