= Ross Johnson (rugby union) =

- Birth name: Ross Johnson
- Date of birth: 25 November 1989 (age 35)
- Place of birth: England
- Height: 5 ft 10 in (1.78 m)
- Weight: 126 kg (19 st 12 lb)

Rugby union career
Senior career
Years	Team	Apps	(Points)
	Cardiff Blues		()
	Bristol Bears		()
	Leinster Rugby		()

Ross Johnson born 25 November 1989 is a rugby union player for Bristol in the Aviva Championship. Before moving to Bristol, he played for Cardiff Blues in the Celtic League who snapped him up from Bucs rugby, He then moved back to Ireland to play for the Irish Province of Leinster Rugby, After spending a stint in Ireland he retired from the game. Since leaving Ireland he now plays for a local club in Cornwall.

Ross Johnson's position of choice is at hooker Johnson perfected his trade under the watchful eye of Riaz Majothi, who is also known for scrummage expertise and his work with Gethin Jenkins. Whilst at Leinster Rugby He was working under Matt Oconnor and then Joe Schmidt.

Squad profile https://www.cardiffrugby.wales/player-profile/ross-johnston-157
