= Chris Brooker =

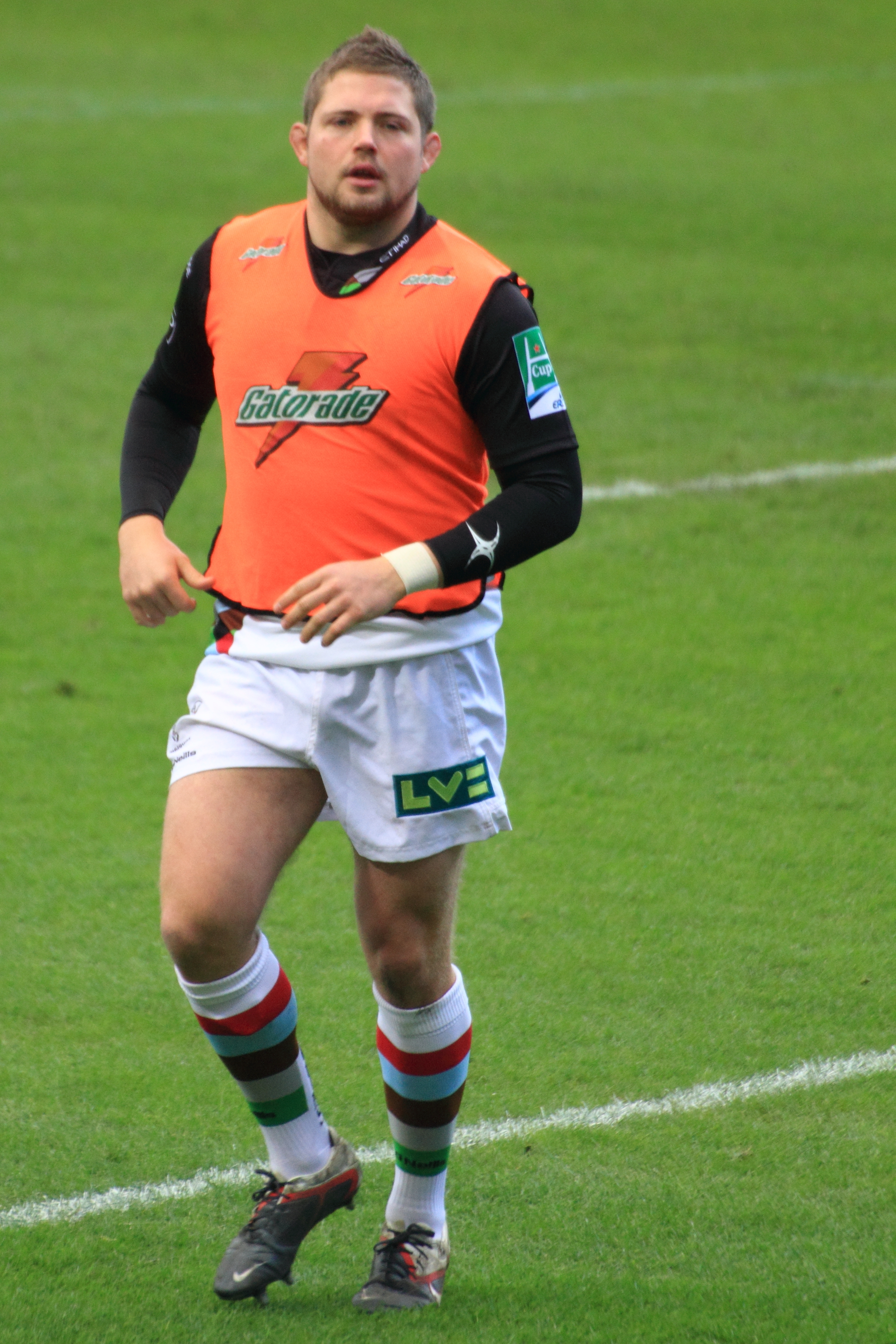
- Brooker in 2011
- Born: Chris Brooker; 31 May 1986 (age 40) Bristol, England
- Height: 1.83 m (6 ft 0 in)
- Weight: 108 kg (17 st 0 lb)
- School: Colston’s Collegiate

Rugby union career
- Position: Hooker / Prop
- Current team: Bristol Rugby
Youth career
- -: Cleve RFC, Bath United
- –: Melksham RFC
Senior career
Years	Team	Apps	(Points)
2006–2010	Bath	2	(0)
2010–2013	Harlequins	54	(25)
2013–2014	Worcester Warriors		
2014-	Bristol		
National sevens team
Years	Team		Comps
- England

Chris Brooker (born 31 May 1986) is an English rugby union player, currently playing for Bristol in the RFU Premiership.

== Career ==
Brooker's position of choice is as a hooker. He can also operate as a prop.

He has previously played for Bath Rugby.

On 11 January 2012, Chris Brooker was included in the England Saxons squad for the first time as reward for a fine season with Harlequins in the Aviva Premiership and Heineken Cup. Also included in the EPS squad, before suffering an injury which sidelined him for over 19 months. Was put in the same bracket as Joe Launchbury by Stuart Lancaster as a potential star of the future but was never present again due to his injury.

In May 2013, it was announced that from the beginning of the 2013/14 season that Brooker would play for Worcester Warriors after signing a long-term deal that would see him leave Harlequins. After appearing over 94 times for the club.

Brooker left Worcester over the summer of 2014 to join his hometown club, Bristol in their quest for promotion.
