= Joe Rees (rugby union, born 1990) =

Welsh rugby union player

- Born: Joe Rees; 31 August 1990 (age 36) Swansea, Wales
- Height: 186 cm (6 ft 1 in)
- Weight: 120 kg (18 st 13 lb)

Rugby union career
- Position: Prop
- Current team: Rotherham Titans
Senior career
Years	Team	Apps	(Points)
2012–2014	Ospreys	23	(0)
2014–2016	Worcester Warriors	31	(0)
2016–2017	Rotherham Titans	0	(0)
2017–2019	Merthyr		
2019–2020	Chinnor		
2020–	London Scottish		
- Correct as of 14 July 2020
International career
Years	Team	Apps	(Points)
	Wales U20	1	(0)
- Correct as of 10 November 2012

Joe Rees (born 31 August 1990) is a Welsh rugby union player. A prop forward, he plays club rugby for the Ospreys regional team having previously played for Swansea RFC. Rees has also represented Wales at under-20 level.

On 4 February 2014, Rees left Ospreys to join Worcester Warriors in the RFU Championship from the 2014–15 season. On 9 June 2016, Rees left Worcester to join Championship club Rotherham Titans from the 2016–17 season. After stints at both Merthyr and Chinnor, Rees signed for London Scottish ahead of the 2020–21 season.
