= 2006–07 National Division One =

Rugby union competition in England

- Countries: England
- Champions: Leeds Tykes
- Runners-up: Earth Titans
- Relegated: Otley and Waterloo
- Attendance: 371,778 (average 1,596 per match) (Note: Note that 1 home attendance is missing (see below) - so the total attendance will not be 100% accurate. The average attendance has also been taken into account with the missing game not included.)
- Highest attendance: 7,105 Leeds Tykes at home to Earth Titans on 22 April 2007
- Lowest attendance: 308 Pertemps Bees at home to Plymouth Albion on 3 February 2007
- Top point scorer: (England) Leigh Hinton (Leeds Tykes) 302 points
- Top try scorer: (France) Nicolas Sestaret (Plymouth Albion) 28 tries

The 2006–07 National Division One was the 20th full season of rugby union within the second tier of the English league system, currently known as the RFU Championship. This season saw the league increased from 14 to 16 teams with new teams including Leeds Tykes (relegated from the 2005–06 Guinness Premiership), as well as Moseley and Waterloo who were promoted from 2005–06 National Division Two. Other changes saw Exeter Chiefs move from the County Ground to Sandy Park, a modern stadium with room for further expansion, Nottingham moved from Ireland Avenue to groundshare with Notts County at the much larger Meadow Lane and finally Cornish Pirates moved from their temporary ground at Kenwyn in Truro to the larger (and more permanent) Recreation Ground owned by Camborne RFC.

Leeds Tykes bounced back by winning the National Division One title at the first attempt and returned to the Guinness Premiership for season 2007–08. Earth Titans finished in second place, and Otley and Waterloo were relegated to the 2007–08 National Division Two.

== Participating teams ==
Locations of the 2006–07 National Division One teams

Team	Stadium	Capacity	City/Area
Bedford Blues	Goldington Road	5,000 (Note: The capacity of Bedford's Goldington Road ground was reduced from 5,500 to 5,000 for the 2006–07 season following the removal of temporary stands which had been erected the previous season.)	Bedford, Bedfordshire
Cornish Pirates	Recreation Ground	9,000	Camborne, Cornwall
Coventry	Butts Park Arena	4,000	Coventry, West Midlands
Doncaster Knights	Castle Park	3,075	Doncaster, South Yorkshire
Earth Titans	Clifton Lane	2,500	Rotherham, South Yorkshire
Exeter Chiefs	Sandy Park	6,000	Exeter, Devon
Leeds Tykes	Headingley Stadium	22,250	Leeds, West Yorkshire
London Welsh	Old Deer Park	4,500 (1,500 seats)	Richmond, London
Moseley	Billesley Common	3,000+	Birmingham, West Midlands
Newbury	Monk's Lane	8,000	Newbury, Berkshire
Nottingham	Meadow Lane	19,588	Nottingham, Nottinghamshire
Otley	Cross Green	7,000 (852 seats)	Otley, West Yorkshire
Pertemps Bees	Sharmans Cross	3,500 (1,000 seats)	Solihull, West Midlands
Plymouth Albion	The Brickfields	6,500	Plymouth, Devon
Sedgley Park	Park Lane	3,000	Whitefield, Greater Manchester
Waterloo	St Anthony's Road	9,950 (950 seats)	Blundellsands, Merseyside

== Table ==
2006–2007 National Division One table
Pos	Team	Pld	W	D	L	PF	PA	PD	B	Pts	Qualification
1	Leeds Tykes (C)	30	24	2	4	960	474	+486	23	123	Promoted
2	Earth Titans	30	23	1	6	937	501	+436	24	118	
3	Doncaster Knights	30	22	1	7	855	474	+381	20	110	
4	Exeter Chiefs	30	21	1	8	774	507	+267	15	101	
5	Cornish Pirates	30	20	2	8	812	493	+319	17	101	
6	Plymouth Albion	30	19	1	10	789	450	+339	19	97	
7	Bedford Blues	30	18	1	11	827	566	+261	21	95	
8	Pertemps Bees	30	13	2	15	736	911	−175	20	76	
9	Nottingham	30	13	0	17	805	718	+87	21	73	
10	Coventry	30	12	2	16	569	745	−176	13	65	
11	Newbury	30	11	0	19	661	774	−113	13	57	
12	London Welsh	30	11	1	18	572	794	−222	10	56	
13	Sedgley Park	30	10	0	20	614	936	−322	12	52	
14	Moseley	30	7	0	23	527	943	−416	9	37	
15	Otley (R)	30	6	0	24	457	904	−447	7	31	Relegated
16	Waterloo (R)	30	3	0	27	470	1175	−705	6	18	Relegated

Rules for classification: Points are awarded as follows: four points for a win; two points for a draw; no points for a loss; one bonus point for scoring four tries or more in a match; one bonus point for losing by seven points or less.
- If teams are level at any stage, tiebreakers are applied in the following order: (1) difference between points for and against; (2) total number of points for.
  (C) Champion; (R) Relegated

== Results ==
=== Round 1 ===
2 September 2006

Bedford Blues	29 - 29	Pertemps Bees
	Report

Goldington Road
Attendance: 1,772
Referee: Dale Newitt

2 September 2006

Doncaster Knights	27 - 11	Newbury
	Report

Castle Park
Attendance: 735
Referee: Chris Sharp

2 September 2006

Moseley	13 - 35	Earth Titans
	Report

Billesley
Attendance: 998
Referee: Gareth Copsey

2 September 2006

Sedgley Park	17 - 32	Coventry
	Report

Park Lane
Attendance: 635
Referee: Ashley Rowden

2 September 2006

Waterloo	9 - 45	Plymouth Albion
	Report

St. Anthony's Road
Attendance: 400
Referee: Greg Garner

3 September 2006

Cornish Pirates	39 - 0	Otley
	Report

Recreation Ground
Attendance: 956
Referee: Nick Williams

3 September 2006

Leeds Tykes	10 - 16	London Welsh
	Report

Headingley Stadium
Attendance: 2,716
Referee: Dean Richards

3 September 2006

Nottingham	19 - 24	Exeter Chiefs
	Report

Meadow Lane
Attendance: 1,335
Referee: Rowan Kitt

=== Round 2 ===
9 September 2006

Coventry	15 - 22	Earth Titans
	Report

Butts Park Arena
Attendance: 1,700
Referee: Nick Williams

9 September 2006

Moseley	44 - 37	Bedford Blues
	Report

Billesley
Attendance: 998
Referee: Martin Fox

9 September 2006

Newbury	10 - 24	Leeds Tykes
	Report

Monk's Lane
Attendance: 643
Referee: Llyr Apgeraint-Roberts

9 September 2006

Otley	37 - 27	Nottingham
	Report

Cross Green
Attendance: 864
Referee: Greg Garner

9 September 2006

Pertemps Bees	35 - 17	Exeter Chiefs
	Report

Sharmans Cross
Attendance: 750
Referee: Ashley Rowden

9 September 2006

Plymouth Albion	20 - 12	London Welsh
	Report

Brickfields
Attendance: 2,374
Referee: Gareth Copsey

9 September 2006

Sedgley Park	6 - 48	Doncaster Knights
	Report

Park Lane
Attendance: 530
Referee: Andrew Vertigan

9 September 2006

Waterloo	19 - 16	Cornish Pirates
	Report

Blundellsands
Attendance: 425
Referee: Andrew Small

=== Round 3 ===
16 September 2006

Bedford Blues	41 - 7	Sedgley Park
	Report

Goldington Road
Attendance: 1,920
Referee: Steve Lander

16 September 2006

Earth Titans	27 - 8	Otley
	Report

Clifton Lane
Attendance: 1,183
Referee: Dean Richards

16 September 2006

Exeter Chiefs	13 - 13	Coventry
	Report

Sandy Park
Attendance: 5,234
Referee: Richard Draper

16 September 2006

London Welsh	13 - 21	Newbury
	Report

Old Deer Park
Attendance: 920
Referee: Richard Phillips

16 September 2006

Pertemps Bees	20 - 23	Leeds Tykes
	Report

Sharmans Cross
Attendance: 1,100
Referee: Mark Wilson

16 September 2006

Plymouth Albion	14 - 13	Doncaster Knights
	Report

Brickfields
Attendance: 2,553
Referee: Llyr Apgeraint-Roberts

17 September 2006

Cornish Pirates	52 - 16	Moseley
	Report

Recreation Ground
Attendance: 1,525
Referee: Bruce Robertson

17 September 2006

Nottingham	63 - 17	Waterloo
	Report

Meadow Lane
Attendance: 1,029
Referee: Tim Wigglesworth

=== Round 4 ===
23 September 2006

Coventry	15 - 14	Moseley
	Report

Butts Park Arena
Attendance: 1,822
Referee: Dale Newitt

23 September 2006

Doncaster Knights	43 - 29	Nottingham
	Report

Castle Park
Attendance: 1,021
Referee: Greg Garner

23 September 2006

Exeter Chiefs	27 - 22	Earth Titans
	Report

Sandy Park
Attendance: 2,805
Referee: Llyr Apgeraint-Roberts

23 September 2006

Leeds Tykes	21 - 20	Cornish Pirates
	Report

Headingley Stadium
Attendance: 2,037
Referee: Tim Wigglesworth

23 September 2006

Newbury	19 - 34	Bedford Blues
	Report

Monk's Lane
Attendance: 723
Referee: Richard Draper

23 September 2006

Otley	3 - 36	Plymouth Albion
	Report

Cross Green
Referee: Bruce Robertson

23 September 2006

Sedgley Park	33 - 34	Pertemps Bees
	Report

Park Lane
Attendance: 625
Referee: Tim Beddow

23 September 2006

Waterloo	18 - 23	London Welsh
	Report

St. Anthony's Road
Attendance: 525
Referee: Mark Wilson

=== Round 5 ===
30 September 2006

Bedford Blues	22 - 10	Exeter Chiefs
	Report

Goldington Road
Attendance: 2,272
Referee: David Rose

30 September 2006

Earth Titans	66 - 17	Waterloo
	Report

Clifton Lane
Attendance: 1,043
Referee: Andrew Vertigan

30 September 2006

London Welsh	8 - 29	Doncaster Knights
	Report

Old Deer Park
Attendance: 850
Referee: Ashley Rowden

30 September 2006

Moseley	30 - 35	Pertemps Bees
	Report

Billesley
Attendance: 995
Referee: Chris Sharp

30 September 2006

Plymouth Albion	27 - 19	Coventry
	Report

Brickfields
Attendance: 2,906
Referee: Rowan Kitt

30 September 2006

Sedgley Park	20 - 43	Otley
	Report

Park Lane
Attendance: 623
Referee: Tim Wigglesworth

1 October 2006

Cornish Pirates	34 - 13	Newbury
	Report

Recreation Ground
Attendance: 1,746
Referee: Alan Biggs

1 October 2006

Nottingham	30 - 37	Leeds Tykes
	Report

Meadow Lane
Attendance: 1,791
Referee: Gareth Copsey

=== Round 6 ===
7 October 2006

Coventry	20 - 27	London Welsh
	Report

Butts Park Arena
Attendance: 1,583
Referee: Tim Wigglesworth

7 October 2006

Doncaster Knights	23 - 29	Cornish Pirates
	Report

Castle Park
Attendance: 1,478
Referee: Rowan Kitt

7 October 2006

Exeter Chiefs	18 - 14	Plymouth Albion
	Report

Sandy Park
Attendance: 5,738
Referee: Gareth Copsey

7 October 2006

Newbury	19 - 18	Nottingham
	Report

Monk's Lane
Attendance: 523
Referee: Mark Wilson

7 October 2006

Otley	16 - 13	Moseley
	Report

Cross Green
Attendance: 903
Referee: Llyr Apgeraint-Roberts

7 October 2006

Pertemps Bees	6 - 31	Earth Titans
	Report

Sharmans Cross
Attendance: 700
Referee: Dale Newitt

7 October 2006

Waterloo	13 - 42	Bedford Blues
	Report

St. Anthony's Road
Attendance: 450
Referee: Richard Draper

8 October 2006

Leeds Tykes	35 - 20	Sedgley Park
	Report

Headingley Stadium
Attendance: 2,227
Referee: Greg Garner

=== Round 7 ===
14 October 2006

Bedford Blues	25 - 21	Leeds Tykes
	Report

Goldington Road
Attendance: 3,049
Referee: Llyr Apgeraint-Roberts

14 October 2006

Doncaster Knights	29 - 13	Coventry
	Report

Castle Park
Attendance: 1,094

14 October 2006

Earth Titans	33 - 7	Nottingham
	Report

Clifton Lane
Attendance: 1,438
Referee: Richard Draper

14 October 2006

London Welsh	24 - 30	Exeter Chiefs
	Report

Old Deer Park
Attendance: 1,350
Referee: Tim Beddow

14 October 2006

Moseley	17 - 22	Newbury
	Report

Billesley
Attendance: 751
Referee: Andrew Vertigan

14 October 2006

Otley	30 - 17	Waterloo
	Report

Cross Green
Attendance: 1,017
Referee: Martin Fox

14 October 2006

Plymouth Albion	38 - 29	Pertemps Bees
	Report

Brickfields
Attendance: 2,809
Referee: Greg Garner

14 October 2006

Sedgley Park	3 - 55	Cornish Pirates
	Report

Park Lane
Attendance: 609
Referee: Nick Williams

=== Round 8 ===
21 October 2006

Coventry	20 - 3	Otley
	Report

Butts Park Arena
Attendance: 1,437
Referee: Richard Draper

21 October 2006

Earth Titans	47 - 6	London Welsh
	Report

Clifton Lane
Attendance: 1,321
Referee: Ashley Rowden

21 October 2006

Exeter Chiefs	13 - 22	Waterloo
	Report

Sandy Park
Attendance: 2,724
Referee: Terry Hall

21 October 2006

Leeds Tykes	30 - 18	Doncaster Knights
	Report

Castle Park
Attendance: 2,004
Referee: Dale Newitt

21 October 2006

Moseley	32 - 25	Sedgley Park
	Report

Billesley
Attendance: 624
Referee: Tim Beddow

21 October 2006

Pertemps Bees	27 - 33	Newbury
	Report

Sharmans Cross
Attendance: 709
Referee: Bruce Robertson

22 October 2006

Cornish Pirates	34 - 5	Bedford Blues
	Report

Recreation Ground
Attendance: 2,280
Referee: Gareth Copsey

22 October 2006

Nottingham	14 - 13	Plymouth Albion
	Report

Meadow Lane
Attendance: 2,272
Referee: Llyr Apgeraint-Roberts

=== Round 9 ===
28 October 2006

Bedford Blues	38 - 8	Coventry
	Report

Goldington Road
Attendance: 2,466
Referee: Martin Fox

28 October 2006

Doncaster Knights	25 - 15	Otley
	Report

Castle Park
Attendance: 1,104
Referee: Chris Sharp

28 October 2006

London Welsh	32 - 47	Nottingham
	Report

Old Deer Park
Attendance: 850
Referee: Rowan Kitt

28 October 2006

Newbury	23 - 28	Plymouth Albion
	Report

Monk's Lane
Attendance: 820
Referee: Stuart Dickinson

28 October 2006

Sedgley Park	20 - 25	Earth Titans
	Report

Park Lane
Attendance: 639
Referee: Tim Wigglesworth

28 October 2006

Waterloo	19 - 38	Pertemps Bees
	Report

Bundellsands
Attendance: 630
Referee: Richard Phillips

29 October 2006

Cornish Pirates	37 - 20	Exeter Chiefs
	Report

Recreation Ground
Attendance: 4,580
Referee: Dale Newitt

29 October 2006

Leeds Tykes	37 - 27	Moseley
	Report

Headingley Stadium
Attendance: 2,306
Referee: Greg Garner

=== Round 10 ===
4 November 2006

Coventry	29 - 24	Newbury
	Report

Butts Park Arena
Attendance: 1,331
Referee: Rowan Kitt

4 November 2006

Exeter Chiefs	34 - 16	Moseley
	Report

Sandy Park
Attendance: 2,295
Referee: Richard Phillips

4 November 2006

Otley	21 - 31	Bedford Blues
	Report

Cross Green
Attendance: 963
Referee: Nick Williams

4 November 2006

Pertemps Bees	13 - 39	Doncaster Knights
	Report

Sharmans Cross
Attendance: 632
Referee: Martin Fox

4 November 2006

Plymouth Albion	14 - 11	Earth Titans
	Report

Brickfields
Attendance: 2,964
Referee: Tim Beddow

4 November 2006

Sedgley Park	27 - 20	London Welsh
	Report

Park Lane
Attendance: 617
Referee: Ashley Rowden

4 November 2006

Waterloo	15 - 77	Leeds Tykes
	Report

St. Anthony's Road
Attendance: 600
Referee: Mark Wilson

5 November 2006

Nottingham	20 - 24	Cornish Pirates
	Report

Meadow Lane
Attendance: 1,702
Referee: Chris Sharp

=== Round 11 ===
11 November 2006

Earth Titans	18 - 24	Cornish Pirates
	Report

Clifton Lane
Attendance: 1,227
Referee: Dale Newitt

11 November 2006

Exeter Chiefs	21 - 35	Leeds Tykes
	Report

Sandy Park
Attendance: 3,155
Referee: Bruce Robertson

11 November 2006

London Welsh	22 - 26	Pertemps Bees
	Report

Old Deer Park
Attendance: 450
Referee: Llyr Apgeraint-Roberts

11 November 2006

Moseley	0 - 22	Doncaster Knights
	Report

Billesley
Attendance: 759
Referee: Andrew Vertigan

11 November 2006

Newbury	34 - 15	Otley
	Report

Monk's Lane
Attendance: 475
Referee: Andrew Small

11 November 2006

Plymouth Albion	30 - 6	Sedgley Park
	Report

Brickfields
Attendance: 2,706
Referee: Dean Richards

12 November 2006

Coventry	46 - 12	Waterloo
	Report

Butts Park Arena
Attendance: 1,357
Referee: Gareth Copsey

12 November 2006

Nottingham	29 - 28	Bedford Blues
	Report

Meadow Lane
Attendance: 2,304
Referee: Greg Garner

=== Round 12 ===
18 November 2006

Bedford Blues	32 - 34	Earth Titans
	Report

Goldington Road
Attendance: 2,441
Referee: Rowan Kitt

18 November 2006

Doncaster Knights	24 - 11	Exeter Chiefs
	Report

Castle Park
Attendance: 723
Referee: Gareth Copsey

18 November 2006

Moseley	5 - 50	Plymouth Albion
	Report

Billesley
Attendance: 1,032
Referee: Mark Wilson

18 November 2006

Otley	7 - 11	Pertemps Bees
	Report

Cross Green
Attendance: 671
Referee: Richard Draper

18 November 2006

Sedgley Park	22 - 19	Nottingham
	Report

Park Lane
Attendance: 602
Referee: Llyr Apgeraint-Roberts

18 November 2006

Waterloo	20 - 49	Newbury
	Report

St. Anthony's Road
Attendance: 470
Referee: Tim Wigglesworth

19 November 2006

Cornish Pirates	41 - 13	London Welsh
	Report

Recreation Ground
Attendance: 2,548
Referee: Tim Beddow

19 November 2006

Leeds Tykes	34 - 0	Coventry
	Report

Headingley Stadium
Attendance: 2,008
Referee: Dale Newitt

=== Round 13 ===
25 November 2006

Earth Titans	52 - 3	Moseley
	Report

Clifton Lane
Attendance: 1,021
Referee: Llyr Apgeraint-Roberts

25 November 2006

Exeter Chiefs	33 - 0	Nottingham
	Report

Sandy Park
Attendance: 2,174
Referee: Dale Newitt

25 November 2006

Otley	23 - 19	Cornish Pirates
	Report

Cross Green
Attendance: 918
Referee: Terry Hall

25 November 2006

Pertemps Bees	34 - 27	Bedford Blues
	Report

Sharmans Cross
Attendance: 732
Referee: Nick Williams

25 November 2006

Plymouth Albion	40 - 7	Waterloo
	Report

Brickfields
Attendance: 1,971
Referee: Chris Sharp

26 November 2006

Coventry	32 - 25	Sedgley Park
	Report

Butts Park Arena
Attendance: 1,450
Referee: Dean Richards

26 November 2006

London Welsh	18 - 38	Leeds Tykes
	Report

Old Deer Park
Attendance: 450
Referee: Greg Garner

26 November 2006

Newbury	5 - 22	Doncaster Knights
	Report

Monk's Lane
Attendance: 480
Referee: Bruce Robertson

=== Round 14 ===
2 December 2006

Bedford Blues	34 - 10	Moseley
	Report

Goldington Road
Attendance: 2,170
Referee: Gareth Copsey

2 December 2006

Doncaster Knights	52 - 17	Sedgley Park
	Report

Castle Park
Attendance: 1,101
Referee: Richard Phillips

2 December 2006

Earth Titans	56 - 10	Coventry
	Report

Clifton Lane
Attendance: 1,054
Referee: Mark Wilson

2 December 2006

Exeter Chiefs	22 - 11	Pertemps Bees
	Report

Sandy Park
Attendance: 2,414
Referee: Greg Garner

2 December 2006

London Welsh	7 - 55	Plymouth Albion
	Report

Old Deer Park
Attendance: 680
Referee: Andrew Vertigan

3 December 2006

Cornish Pirates	36 - 18	Waterloo
	Report

Recreation Ground
Attendance: 1,769
Referee: Ashley Rowden

3 December 2006

Leeds Tykes	45 - 13	Newbury
	Report

Headingley
Attendance: 1,760
Referee: Rowan Kitt

3 December 2006

Nottingham	35 - 22	Otley
	Report

Meadow Lane
Attendance: 1,203

=== Round 15 ===
9 December 2006

Coventry	24 - 21	Exeter Chiefs
	Report

Butts Park Arena
Attendance: 1,351
Referee: Nick Williams

9 December 2006

Doncaster Knights	12 - 8	Plymouth Albion
	Report

Castle Park
Attendance: 1,054
Referee: Tim Beddow

9 December 2006

Moseley	13 - 42	Cornish Pirates
	Report

Billesley
Attendance: 771
Referee: Mark Wilson

9 December 2006

Newbury	29 - 15	London Welsh
	Report

Monk's Lane
Attendance: 652
Referee: Greg Garner

9 December 2006

Otley	3 - 47	Earth Titans
	Report

Cross Green
Attendance: 1,277
Referee: Ashley Rowden

9 December 2006

Sedgley Park	10 - 8	Bedford Blues
	Report

Park Lane
Attendance: 601
Referee: Llyr Apgeraint-Roberts

9 December 2006

Waterloo	21 - 37	Nottingham
	Report

St. Anthony's Road
Attendance: 571
Referee: Andrew Vertigan

10 December 2006

Leeds Tykes	27 - 10	Pertemps Bees
	Report

Headingley Stadium
Attendance: 1,767
Referee: Andrew Small

=== Round 16 ===
16 December 2006

Bedford Blues	29 - 15	Newbury
	Report

Goldington Road
Attendance: 1,932
Referee: Bruce Robertson

16 December 2006

Earth Titans	0 - 29	Exeter Chiefs
	Report

Clifton Lane
Attendance: 956
Referee: Roy Maybank

16 December 2006

London Welsh	24 - 19	Waterloo
	Report

Old Deer Park
Attendance: 720
Referee: Richard Draper

16 December 2006

Moseley	15 - 13	Coventry
	Report

Billesley
Attendance: 1,415
Referee: Rowan Kitt

16 December 2006

Pertemps Bees	7 - 27	Sedgley Park
	Report

Sharmans Cross
Attendance: 610
Referee: David Rose

16 December 2006

Plymouth Albion	52 - 20	Otley
	Report

Brickfields
Attendance: 2,748
Referee: Richard Phillips

17 December 2006

Cornish Pirates	21 - 21	Leeds Tykes
	Report

Recreation Ground
Attendance: 3,024
Referee: Gareth Copsey

17 December 2006

Nottingham	17 - 35	Doncaster Knights
	Report

Meadow Lane
Attendance: 1,280
Referee: Mark Wilson

=== Round 17 ===
23 December 2006

Cornish Pirates	13 - 26	Plymouth Albion
	Report

Recreation Ground
Attendance: 5,365
Referee: Dean Richards

23 December 2006

Doncaster Knights	15 - 9	Earth Titans
	Report

Castle Park
Attendance: 2,495
Referee: Bruce Robertson

23 December 2006

Exeter Chiefs	25 - 11	Newbury
	Report

Sandy Park
Attendance: 3,782
Referee: Dale Newitt

23 December 2006

Leeds Tykes	30 - 8	Otley
	Report

Headingley Stadium
Attendance: 5,310
Referee: Rowan Kitt

23 December 2006

Sedgley Park	37 - 18	Waterloo
	Report

Park Lane
Attendance: 648
Referee: Nick Williams

24 December 2006

Nottingham	42 - 7	Moseley
	Report

Meadow Lane
Attendance: 1,425
Referee: Llyr Apgeraint-Roberts

26 December 2006

Bedford Blues	35 - 15	London Welsh
	Report

Goldington Road
Attendance: 3,202
Referee: Tim Beddow

26 December 2006

Pertemps Bees	22 - 16	Coventry
	Report

Sharmans Cross
Attendance: 1,150
Referee: Greg Garner

=== Round 18 ===
30 December 2006

Coventry	29 - 12	Nottingham
	Report

Butts Park Arena
Attendance: 1,646
Referee: Ashley Rowden

30 December 2006

Earth Titans	22 - 19	Leeds Tykes
	Report

Clifton Lane
Attendance: 2,395
Referee: Tim Wigglesworth

30 December 2006

London Welsh	6 - 13	Moseley
	Report

Old Deer Park
Attendance: 1,198
Referee: Bruce Robertson

30 December 2006

Newbury	P - P	Sedgley Park

- Postponed. Game rescheduled to 24 March 2007.

30 December 2006

Otley	3 - 34	Exeter Chiefs
	Report

Cross Green
Attendance: 1,293
Referee: Llyr Apgeraint-Roberts

30 December 2006

Pertemps Bees	8 - 17	Cornish Pirates
	Report

Sharmans Cross
Attendance: 612
Referee: Richard Draper

30 December 2006

Plymouth Albion	22 - 8	Bedford Blues
	Report

Brickfields
Attendance: 3,827
Referee: Gareth Copsey

30 December 2006

Waterloo	0 - 44	Doncaster Knights
	Report

St. Anthony's Road
Attendance: 470
Referee: Chris Sharp

=== Round 19 ===
6 January 2007

Bedford Blues	9 - 6	Doncaster Knights
	Report

Goldington Road
Attendance: 1,975
Referee: Rob Debney

6 January 2007

Earth Titans	32 - 15	Newbury
	Report

Clifton Lane
Attendance: 1,284
Referee: Nick Williams

6 January 2007

London Welsh	24 - 11	Otley
	Report

Old Deer Park
Attendance: 580
Referee: Greg Garner

6 January 2007

Moseley	12 - 20	Waterloo
	Report

Billesley
Attendance: 400
Referee: Tim Beddow

6 January 2007

Sedgley Park	8 - 22	Exeter Chiefs
	Report

Park Lane
Attendance: 578
Referee: Richard Draper

7 January 2007

Cornish Pirates	16 - 15	Coventry
	Report

Recreation Ground
Attendance: 1,870
Referee: Terry Hall

7 January 2007

Leeds Tykes	14 - 8	Plymouth Albion
	Report

Headingley Stadium
Attendance: 2,445
Referee: Bruce Robertson

7 January 2007

Nottingham	55 - 19	Pertemps Bees
	Report

Meadow Lane
Attendance: 1,032
Referee: Mark Wilson

=== Round 20 ===
13 January 2007

Coventry	16 - 11	Plymouth Albion
	Report

Butts Park Arena
Attendance: 1,377
Referee: Rowan Kitt

13 January 2007

Doncaster Knights	20 - 20	London Welsh
	Report

Castle Park
Attendance: 1,050
Referee: Terry Hall

13 January 2007

Exeter Chiefs	35 - 10	Bedford Blues
	Report

Sandy Park
Attendance: 3,181
Referee: Mark Wilson

13 January 2007

Newbury	15 - 20	Cornish Pirates
	Report

Monk's Lane
Attendance: 915
Referee: Llyr Apgeraint-Roberts

13 January 2007

Otley	14 - 25	Sedgley Park
	Report

Cross Green
Attendance: 780
Referee: Martin Fox

13 January 2007

Pertemps Bees	36 - 25	Moseley
	Report

Sharmans Cross
Attendance: 1,600

13 January 2007

Waterloo	14 - 29	Earth Titans
	Report

St. Anthony's Road
Attendance: 456
Referee: Richard Phillips

14 January 2007

Leeds Tykes	28 - 15	Nottingham
	Report

Headingley Stadium
Attendance: 2,157
Referee: Tim Beddow

=== Round 21 ===
27 January 2007

Bedford Blues	49 - 3	Waterloo
	Report

Goldington Road
Attendance: 1,802
Referee: Nick Williams

27 January 2007

Earth Titans	43 - 5	Pertemps Bees
	Report

Clifton Lane
Attendance: 1,232
Referee: Gareth Copsey

27 January 2007

London Welsh	28 - 18	Coventry
	Report

Old Deer Park
Attendance: 1,120
Referee: Roy Maybank

27 January 2007

Moseley	25 - 16	Otley
	Report

Billesley
Attendance: 1,212
Referee: Richard Draper

27 January 2007

Plymouth Albion	13 - 20	Exeter Chiefs
	Report

Brickfields
Attendance: 5,015
Referee: Tim Wigglesworth

27 January 2007

Sedgley Park	20 - 27	Leeds Tykes
	Report

Park Lane
Attendance: 552
Referee: Dale Newitt

28 January 2007

Cornish Pirates	26 - 23	Doncaster Knights
	Report

Recreation Ground
Attendance: 2,862
Referee: David Rose

28 January 2007

Nottingham	27 - 25	Newbury
	Report

Meadow Lane
Attendance: 1,192
Referee: Adrian Hartwell

=== Round 22 ===
3 February 2007

Coventry	16 - 24	Doncaster Knights
	Report

Butts Park Arena
Attendance: 1,279
Referee: Llyr Apgeraint-Roberts

3 February 2007

Exeter Chiefs	25 - 21	London Welsh
	Report

Sandy Park
Attendance: 2,250
Referee: David Rose

3 February 2007

Newbury	35 - 17	Moseley
	Report

Monk's Lane
Attendance: 523
Referee: Rowan Kitt

3 February 2007

Pertemps Bees	28 - 20	Plymouth Albion
	Report

Sharmans Cross
Attendance: 308
Referee: Adrian Hartwell

3 February 2007

Waterloo	17 - 20	Otley
	Report

St. Anthony's Road
Attendance: 375
Referee: Gareth Copsey

3 February 2007

Nottingham	P - P	Earth Titans

- Postponed. Game rescheduled to 4 March 2007.

4 February 2007

Cornish Pirates	39 - 13	Sedgley Park
	Report

Recreation Ground
Attendance: 2,012
Referee: Terry Hall

4 February 2007

Leeds Tykes	31 - 0	Bedford Blues
	Report

Headingley
Attendance: 2,287
Referee: Ashley Rowden

=== Round 23 ===
17 February 2007

Bedford Blues	P - P	Cornish Pirates

- Postponed. Game rescheduled to 4 April 2007.

17 February 2007

Doncaster Knights	16 - 30	Leeds Tykes
	Report

Castle Park
Attendance: 2,978
Referee: Ashley Rowden

17 February 2007

London Welsh	35 - 38	Earth Titans
	Report

Old Deer Park
Attendance: 1,220
Referee: Gareth Copsey

17 February 2007

Newbury	P - P	Pertemps Bees

- Postponed. Game rescheduled to 14 April 2007.

17 February 2007

Otley	P - P	Coventry

- Postponed. Game rescheduled to 24 March 2007.

17 February 2007

Plymouth Albion	P - P	Nottingham

- Postponed. Game rescheduled to 14 April 2007.

17 February 2007

Sedgley Park	40 - 24	Moseley
	Report

Park Lane
Attendance: 467
Referee: Mark Wilson

17 February 2007

Waterloo	P - P	Exeter Chiefs

- Postponed. Game rescheduled to 17 April 2007.

=== Round 24 ===
24 February 2007

Coventry	17 - 24	Bedford Blues
	Report

Butts Park Arena
Attendance: 1,480
Referee: Adrian Hartwell

24 February 2007

Earth Titans	28 - 7	Sedgley Park
	Report

Clifton Lane
Attendance: 1,231
Referee: Tim Beddow

24 February 2007

Exeter Chiefs	11 - 6	Cornish Pirates
	Report

Sandy Park
Attendance: 5,944
Referee: Nick Williams

24 February 2007

Moseley	6 - 29	Leeds Tykes
	Report

Billesley
Attendance: 736
Referee: Andrew Vertigan

24 February 2007

Otley	9 - 19	Doncaster Knights
	Report

Cross Green
Attendance: 1,016
Referee: Roy Maybank

24 February 2007

Pertemps Bees	43 - 21	Waterloo
	Report

Sharmans Cross
Attendance: 328
Referee: Llyr Apgeraint-Roberts

24 February 2007

Plymouth Albion	29 - 7	Newbury
	Report

Brickfields
Attendance: 2,160
Referee: Rowan Kitt

25 February 2007

Nottingham	21 - 23	London Welsh
	Report

Meadow Lane
Attendance: 1,133
Referee: Greg Garner

=== Round 22 (rescheduled game) ===
4 March 2007

Nottingham	8 - 27	Earth Titans
	Report

Meadow Lane
Attendance: 1,048
Referee: Tim Wigglesworth

=== Round 25 ===
10 March 2007

Bedford Blues	66 - 8	Otley
	Report

Goldington Road
Attendance: 1,802
Referee: Richard Draper

10 March 2007

Doncaster Knights	62 - 25	Pertemps Bees
	Report

Castle Park
Attendance: 882
Referee: Nick Williams

10 March 2007

Earth Titans	35 - 27	Plymouth Albion
	Report

Clifton Lane
Attendance: 1,253
Referee: Tim Beddow

10 March 2007

London Welsh	32 - 17	Sedgley Park
	Report

Old Deer Park
Attendance: 710
Referee: Dean Richards

10 March 2007

Newbury	20 - 25	Coventry
	Report

Monk's Lane
Attendance: 453
Referee: Dale Newitt

10 March 2007

Moseley	12 - 48	Exeter Chiefs
	Report

Billesley
Attendance: 1,090
Referee: Mark Wilson

11 March 2007

Cornish Pirates	20 - 8	Nottingham
	Report

Recreation Ground
Attendance: 2,362
Referee: Gareth Copsey

11 March 2007

Leeds Tykes	66 - 0	Waterloo
	Report

Headingley Stadium
Attendance: 2,051
Referee: JP Doyle

=== Round 26 ===
17 March 2007

Bedford Blues	14 - 10	Nottingham
	Report

Goldington Road
Attendance: 1,743
Referee: Andrew Smith

17 March 2007

Doncaster Knights	27 - 24	Moseley
	Report

Castle Park
Attendance: 837
Referee: Richard Phillips

17 March 2007

Otley	17 - 34	Newbury
	Report

Cross Green
Attendance: 481
Referee: Nick Williams

17 March 2007

Pertemps Bees	31 - 27	London Welsh
	Report

Sharmans Cross
Attendance: 323
Referee: Greg Garner

17 March 2007

Sedgley Park	23 - 35	Plymouth Albion
	Report

Park Lane
Attendance: 506
Referee: Andrew Vertigan

17 March 2007

Waterloo	21 - 22	Coventry
	Report

St. Anthony's Road
Attendance: 355
Referee: Mark Wilson

18 March 2007

Cornish Pirates	16 - 16	Earth Titans
	Report

Recreation Ground
Attendance: 3,120
Referee: Ashley Rowden

18 March 2007

Leeds Tykes	25 - 18	Exeter Chiefs
	Report

Headingley Stadium
Attendance: 2,634
Referee: Dale Newitt

=== Round 18 & 23 (rescheduled games) ===
24 March 2007

Newbury	15 - 28	Sedgley Park
	Report

Monk's Lane
Attendance: 410
Referee: Gareth Copsey

24 March 2007

Otley	16 - 22	Coventry
	Report

Cross Green
Attendance: 876
Referee: Bruce Robertson

=== Round 27 ===
31 March 2007

Coventry	11 - 55	Leeds Tykes
	Report

Butts Park Arena
Attendance: 1,832
Referee: Tim Beddow

31 March 2007

Earth Titans	26 - 20	Bedford Blues
	Report

Clifton Lane
Attendance: 1,672
Referee: Bruce Robertson

31 March 2007

Exeter Chiefs	36 - 12	Doncaster Knights
	Report

Sandy Park
Attendance: 2,932
Referee: Gareth Copsey

31 March 2007

London Welsh	16 - 10	Cornish Pirates
	Report

Old Deer Park
Attendance: 1,650
Referee: JP Doyle

31 March 2007

Newbury	18 - 17	Waterloo
	Report

Monk's Lane
Attendance: 501
Referee: Adrian Hartwell

31 March 2007

Pertemps Bees	57 - 23	Otley
	Report

Sharmans Cross
Attendance: 400
Referee: Rowan Kitt

31 March 2007

Plymouth Albion	48 - 0	Moseley
	Report

Brickfields
Attendance: 2,723
Referee: Richard Draper

1 April 2007

Nottingham	50 - 0	Sedgley Park
	Report

Meadow Lane
Attendance: 1,003
Referee: Terry Hall

=== Round 23 (rescheduled game) ===
4 April 2007

Bedford Blues	41 - 10	Cornish Pirates
	Report

Goldington Road
Attendance: 1,760
Referee: Adrian Hartwell

=== Round 28 ===
7 April 2007

Coventry	33 - 33	Pertemps Bees
	Report

Butts Park Arena
Attendance: 1,241
Referee: Mark Wilson

7 April 2007

Earth Titans	17 - 36	Doncaster Knights
	Report

Clifton Lane
Attendance: 2,871
Referee: Roy Maybank

7 April 2007

London Welsh	10 - 47	Bedford Blues
	Report

Old Deer Park
Attendance: 1,450
Referee: Terry Hall

7 April 2007

Moseley	38 - 32	Nottingham
	Report

Billesley
Attendance: 909
Referee: Tim Wigglesworth

7 April 2007

Newbury	13 - 22	Exeter Chiefs
	Report

Monk's Lane
Attendance: 525
Referee: Richard Phillips

7 April 2007

Otley	12 - 40	Leeds Tykes
	Report

Cross Green
Attendance: 4,178
Referee: Dale Newitt

7 April 2007

Plymouth Albion	19 - 9	Cornish Pirates
	Report

Brickfields
Attendance: 5,981
Referee: Ashley Rowden

7 April 2007

Waterloo	31 - 43	Sedgley Park
	Report

St. Anthony's Road
Attendance: 470
Referee: Nick Williams

=== Round 23 (rescheduled games) ===
14 April 2007

Newbury	47 - 14	Pertemps Bees
	Report

Monk's Lane
Attendance: 385
Referee: JP Doyle

14 April 2007

Plymouth Albion	12 - 17	Nottingham
	Report

Brickfields
Attendance: 2,061
Referee: Mark Wilson

17 April 2007

Waterloo	10 - 46	Exeter Chiefs
	Report

St. Anthony's Road
Attendance: 500
Referee: Chris Sharp

=== Round 29 ===
21 April 2007

Bedford Blues	30 - 13	Plymouth Albion
	Report

Goldington Road
Attendance: 2,282
Referee: Tim Wigglesworth

21 April 2007

Doncaster Knights	68 - 15	Waterloo
	Report

Castle Park
Attendance: 952
Referee: JP Doyle

21 April 2007

Exeter Chiefs	46 - 24	Otley
	Report

Sandy Park
Attendance: 2,434
Referee: Mark Wilson

21 April 2007

Moseley	21 - 23	London Welsh
	Report

Billesley
Attendance: 1,743
Referee: Andrew Small

21 April 2007

Sedgley Park	47 - 45	Newbury
	Report

Park Lane
Attendance: 527
Referee: Llyr Apgeraint-Roberts

22 April 2007

Cornish Pirates	55 - 14	Pertemps Bees
	Report

Recreation Ground
Attendance: 2,873
Referee: Nick Williams

22 April 2007

Leeds Tykes	29 - 32	Earth Titans
	Report

Headingley Stadium
Attendance: 7,105
Referee: Martin Fox

22 April 2007

Nottingham	54 - 0	Coventry
	Report

Meadow Lane
Attendance: 1,427
Referee: Adrian Hartwell

=== Round 30 ===
28 April 2007

Coventry	20 - 32	Cornish Pirates
	Report

Butts Park Arena
Attendance: 1,915
Referee: Richard Draper

28 April 2007

Doncaster Knights	22 - 12	Bedford Blues
	Report

Castle Park
Attendance: 1,267
Referee: Greg Garner

28 April 2007

Exeter Chiefs	43 - 21	Sedgley Park
	Report

Sandy Park
Attendance: 3,207
Referee: Gareth Copsey

28 April 2007

Newbury	21 - 57	Rotherham Titans
	Report

Monk's Lane
Attendance: 625
Referee: Bruce Robertson

28 April 2007

Otley	10 - 12	London Welsh
	Report

Cross Green
Attendance: 1,018
Referee: Dale Newitt

28 April 2007

Pertemps Bees	36 - 43	Nottingham
	Report

Sharmans Cross
Attendance: 695
Referee: Mark Wilson

28 April 2007

Plymouth Albion	22 - 22	Leeds Tykes
	Report

Brickfields
Attendance: 4,271
Referee: Llyr Apgeraint-Roberts

28 April 2007

Waterloo	20 - 33	Moseley
	Report

St. Anthony's Road
Attendance: 897
Referee: Ashley Rowden

== Total season attendances ==
Club	Home Games	Total	Average	Highest	Lowest	% Capacity
Bedford Blues	15	32,588	2,173	3,202	1,743	43%
Cornish Pirates	15	38,892	2,593	5,365	956	29%
Coventry	15	22,801	1,520	1,915	1,241	38%
Doncaster	15	18,771	1,251	2,978	723	41%
Earth Titans	15	21,181	1,412	2,871	956	55%
Exeter Chiefs	15	50,269	3,351	5,944	2,174	56%
Leeds Tykes	15	40,814	2,721	7,105	1,760	12%
London Welsh	15	14,198	947	1,650	450	21%
Moseley	15	14,433	962	1,743	400	32%
Newbury	15	8,653	557	915	385	7%
Nottingham	15	21,176	1,412	2,304	1,003	7%
Otley	14 (Note: Missing home attendance v Plymouth Albion on 23 September 2006.)	16,255	1,161	4,178	481	17%
Pertemps Bees	15	10,649	710	1,600	308	20%
Plymouth Albion	15	45,362	3,024	5,981	1,971	47%
Sedgley Park	15	8,612	574	648	467	19%
Waterloo	15	7,124	509	897	355	5%

== Individual statistics ==
- Note that points scorers includes tries as well as conversions, penalties and drop goals.

=== Top points scorers ===
Rank	Player	Team	Appearances	Points
1	(England) Leigh Hinton	Leeds Tykes	24	302
2	(Italy) Alberto Di Bernardo	Cornish Pirates	26	293
3	(England) Oliver Thomas	Moseley	30	285
4	(England) Tony Yapp	Exeter Chiefs	28	280
5	(Canada) James Pritchard	Bedford Blues	25	276
6	(England) Phil Jones	Sedgley Park	30	274
7	(Ireland) Gareth Steenson	Earth Titans	30	264
8	(England) Tom Barlow	Nottingham	29	230
9	(England) Sam Ulph	London Welsh	20	225
10	(Australia) Tim Walsh	Newbury	28	217
10	(England) Ben Russell	Coventry	29	217

=== Top try scorers ===
Rank	Player	Team	Appearances	Tries
1	(France) Nicolas Sestaret	Plymouth Albion	30	28
2	(Wales) Jason Forster	Doncaster	28	25
3	(England) Rhodri McAtee	Cornish Pirates	23	16
3	(Fiji) Akapusi Qera	Pertemps Bees	27	16
3	(England) Jason Luff	Exeter Chiefs	27	16
3	(Ireland) Brian Tuohy	Earth Titans	29	16
4	(England) Richard Welding	Leeds Tykes	23	15
5	(England) Matt Nutall	Pertemps Bees	29	14
6	(England) Mal Roberts	Newbury	23	13
6	(England) Martin Nutt	Newbury	24	13
6	(England) Tom Rock	Leeds Tykes	27	13

== Season records ==
=== Team ===
Largest home win — 66 pts

66 - 0 Leeds Tykes at home to Waterloo on 11 March 2007

Largest away win — 62 pts

77 - 15 Leeds Tykes away to Waterloo on 4 November 2006

Most points scored — 77 pts

77 - 15 Leeds Tykes away to Waterloo on 4 November 2006

Most tries in a match — 12

Leeds Tykes away to Waterloo on 4 November 2006

Most conversions in a match — 9

Doncaster Knights at home to Waterloo on 21 April 2007

Most penalties in a match — 6 (x2)

Sedgley Park away to Coventry on 26 November 2006
Moseley at home to Otley on 27 January 2007

Most drop goals in a match — 2

Newbury at home to Sedgley Park on 24 March 2007

=== Player ===
Most points in a match — 32

(Italy) Alberto Di Bernardo for Cornish Pirates at home to Moseley on 17 September 2006

Most tries in a match — 5

(France) Nicolas Sestaret for Plymouth Albion at home to Moseley on 23 March 2007

Most conversions in a match — 9

(Wales) Cerith Rees for Doncaster Knights at home to Waterloo on 21 April 2007

Most penalties in a match — 6 (x2)

(England) Phil Jones for Sedgley Park away to Coventry on 26 November 2006
(England) Oliver Thomas for Moseley at home to Otley on 27 January 2007

Most drop goals in a match — 2

(England) Nick Defty for Newbury at home to Sedgley Park on 24 March 2007

=== Attendances ===
Highest — 7,105

Leeds Tykes at home to Earth Titans on 22 April 2007

Lowest — 308

Pertemps Bees at home to Plymouth Albion on 3 February 2007

Highest Average Attendance — 3,351

Exeter Chiefs

Lowest Average Attendance — 521

Waterloo

== See also ==
- English rugby union system
