= 2005–06 National Division One =

Rugby union

- Countries: England
- Champions: Harlequins (first title)
- Runners-up: Bedford Blues
- Relegated: no relegation
- Attendance: 374,846 (average 2,245 per match) (Note: Note that 15 home attendances are missing (see below) - so the total attendance will not be 100% accurate. The average attendance has also been taken into account with the missing games not included.)
- Highest attendance: 12,500 Harlequins at home to Plymouth Albion on 29 April 2006
- Lowest attendance: 325 Sedgley Park at home to Newbury on 18 February 2006
- Top point scorer: (England) James Moore (Coventry) 251 points
- Top try scorer: (England) Scott Donald (Earth Titans) 20 tries

The 2005–06 National Division One was the 19th full season of rugby union within the second tier of the English league system, currently known as the RFU Championship. New teams to the division included Harlequins who had been relegated from the 2004–05 Zurich Premiership, while Doncaster and Newbury were promoted from the 2004–05 National Division Two. Additional changes saw Penzance & Newyln RFC rebrand themselves as the Cornish Pirates as well as moving from their home ground, the Mennaye Field in Penzance, to a more central location in Truro at the Kenwyn Rugby Ground (a temporary stadium built in the city) with the aim to appeal more to Cornish fans on the whole as well as making home games more accessible. Rotherham Titans also rebranded themselves as 'Earth Titans' for sponsorship purposes for this season.

After only one season Harlequins won the National Division One at the first attempt and returned to the Guinness Premiership for season 2006–07. Bedford Blues finished in second place and there was no relegation to National Division Two following the RFU's decision to expand National Division One from 14 to 16 teams for the 2006–07 season.

== Participating teams ==
Locations of the 2006–07 National Division One teams

Team	Stadium	Capacity	City/Area
Bedford Blues	Goldington Road	5,500 (Note: Capacity at Goldington Road increased from 5,000 to 5,500 for 2005–06 which was achieved versus Harlequins on 2 December 2005.)	Bedford, Bedfordshire
Cornish Pirates	Kenwyn Rugby Ground	5,800	Truro, Cornwall
Coventry	Butts Park Arena	4,000	Coventry, West Midlands
Doncaster	Castle Park	3,075	Doncaster, South Yorkshire
Earth Titans	Clifton Lane	2,500	Rotherham, South Yorkshire
Exeter Chiefs	County Ground	5,750 (750 seats)	Exeter, Devon
Harlequins	The Stoop	12,500 (Note: The Stoop capacity up from 10,000 to 12,500 for the 2005–06 season with a capacity crowd achieved against Plymouth Albion on 29 April 2006.)	Twickenham, London
London Welsh	Old Deer Park	4,500 (1,500 seats)	Richmond, London
Newbury	Monk's Lane	8,000	Newbury, Berkshire
Nottingham	Ireland Avenue	4,990 (590 seats)	Beeston, Nottinghamshire
Otley	Cross Green	7,000 (852 seats)	Otley, West Yorkshire
Pertemps Bees	Sharmans Cross	3,500 (1,000 seats) (Note: Capacity of Sharman's Cross revised ahead of the 2005–06 season following introduction of a new 1,000 seater stand, reducing capacity from an early 1990s estimate of 4,000 (all standing) to 3,500 (seated and standing)..)	Solihull, West Midlands
Plymouth Albion	The Brickfields	6,500	Plymouth, Devon
Sedgley Park	Park Lane	3,000	Whitefield, Greater Manchester

== Table ==
2005–06 National Division One table
Pos	Team	Pld	W	D	L	PF	PA	PD	TB	LB	Pts	Qualification
1	Harlequins (C)	26	25	0	1	1001	337	+664	20	1	121	Promoted
2	Bedford Blues	26	19	1	6	906	542	+364	17	5	100	
3	Cornish Pirates	26	19	0	7	682	560	+122	12	2	90	
4	Earth Titans	26	15	1	10	715	613	+102	13	4	79	
5	Plymouth Albion	26	14	0	12	639	537	+102	11	8	75	
6	Exeter Chiefs	26	14	0	12	594	602	−8	9	6	71	
7	Nottingham	26	13	0	13	642	604	+38	9	5	66	
8	Otley	26	10	1	15	540	627	−87	3	7	52	
9	Doncaster	26	10	1	15	555	699	−144	5	5	52	
10	Coventry	26	9	0	17	593	732	−139	9	9	52 (Note: Coventry were docked two points for an administrative error when re–registering a player, Dave Millard. Following a foot injury, the winger was loaned to junior club Kenilworth while he was recovering. He returned before the game against Bedford on 27 December 2005 where he was named among the seven replacements. There was an error in the paperwork submitted to the RFU, and although Millard was not used, Coventry were found guilty.)	
11	Newbury (Note: Statement by First Division Rugby regarding Newbury versus Birmingham & Solihull Newbury have been awarded a 0–0 win and 4 league points following their match against Pertemps Bees on 22 April. Pertemps Bees won the match by 35 pts to 22 pts but due to a severe injury crisis had to field three unregistered players with the prior approval of FDR in order to fulfil the fixture. All points gained by either side in the match will be disregarded for the purpose of the official league table in accordance with the RFU Regulations.)	26	8	2	16	614	905	−291	9	1	46	
12	London Welsh	26	8	1	17	536	700	−164	6	5	45	
13	Sedgley Park	26	6	3	17	531	856	−325	7	4	41	
14	Pertemps Bees	26	6	2	18	501	735	−234	3	4	35	

Rules for classification: Points are awarded as follows: four points for a win; two points for a draw; no points for a loss; one bonus point for scoring four tries or more in a match; one bonus point for losing by seven points or less.
- If teams are level at any stage, tiebreakers are applied in the following order: (1) difference between points for and against; (2) total number of points for.
There was no relegation this season.
(C) Champion

== Results ==
=== Round 1 ===
3 September 2005

Coventry	26 - 27	Sedgley Park
	Report

Butts Park Arena
Attendance: 1,483
Referee: Geraint Ashton-Jones

3 September 2005

Doncaster	20 - 40	Cornish Pirates
	Report

Castle Park
Attendance: 1,213
Referee: Gareth Copsey

3 September 2005

Newbury	31 - 24	London Welsh
	Report

Monk's Lane
Attendance: 752
Referee: Llyr Apgeraint-Roberts

3 September 2005

Nottingham	41 - 28	Earth Titans
	Report

Ireland Avenue
Referee: Chris Sharp

3 September 2005

Otley	16 - 16	Bedford Blues
	Report

Cross Green
Attendance: 850
Referee: Andrew Small

3 September 2005

Pertemps Bees	9 - 35	Harlequins
	Report

Sharmans Cross
Attendance: 2,475
Referee: Martin Fox

3 September 2005

Plymouth Albion	35 - 13	Exeter Chiefs
	Report

Brickfields
Attendance: 4,873
Referee: Tim Beddow

=== Round 2 ===
10 September 2005

Bedford Blues	47 - 17	Doncaster
	Report

Goldington Road
Attendance: 1,477
Referee: Chris Sharp

10 September 2005

Coventry	13 - 22	Earth Titans
	Report

Butts Park Arena
Referee: Bruce Robertson

10 September 2005

Exeter Chiefs	21 - 10	London Welsh
	Report

County Ground
Attendance: 1,215
Referee: Richard Draper

10 September 2005

Newbury	25 - 26	Cornish Pirates
	Report

Monk's Lane
Attendance: 715
Referee: Dean Richards

10 September 2005

Otley	15 - 18	Harlequins
	Report

Cross Green
Attendance: 3,417
Referee: Tim Beddow

10 September 2005

Pertemps Bees	24 - 13	Plymouth Albion
	Report

Sharmans Cross
Attendance: 500
Referee: Tim Wigglesworth

10 September 2005

Sedgley Park	12 - 29	Nottingham
	Report

Park Lane
Referee: Nick Williams

=== Round 3 ===
17 September 2005

Bedford Blues	34 - 13	Sedgley Park
	Report

Goldington Road
Attendance: 1,584
Referee: Dale Newitt

17 September 2005

Coventry	30 - 14	Otley
	Report

Butts Park Arena
Attendance: 1,381
Referee: Dean Richards

17 September 2005

Doncaster	17 - 23	Exeter Chiefs
	Report

Castle Park
Attendance: 738
Referee: Andrew Small

17 September 2005

Harlequins	52 - 13	Newbury
	Report

The Stoop
Attendance: 8,017
Referee: Geraint Ashton-Jones

17 September 2005

London Welsh	24 - 15	Pertemps Bees
	Report

Old Deer Park
Attendance: 840
Referee: Gareth Copsey

17 September 2005

Plymouth Albion	23 - 22	Nottingham
	Report

Brickfields
Attendance: 2,582
Referee: Llyr Apgeraint-Roberts

18 September 2005

Cornish Pirates	43 - 13	Earth Titans
	Report

Kenwyn Ground
Attendance: 2,200
Referee: Tim Beddow

=== Round 4 ===
24 September 2005

Doncaster Knights	31 - 29	Coventry
	Report

Castle Park
Referee: Alan Biggs

24 September 2005

Earth Titans	35 - 30	Plymouth Albion
	Report

Clifton Lane
Attendance: 1,120
Referee: Andrew Small

24 September 2005

Exeter Chiefs	16 - 43	Cornish Pirates
	Report

County Ground
Attendance: 2,232
Referee: Geraint Ashton-Jones

24 September 2005

London Welsh	24 - 40	Bedford Blues
	Report

Old Deer Park
Attendance: 1,450
Referee: Dean Richards

24 September 2005

Newbury	42 - 27	Otley
	Report

Monk's Lane
Attendance: 664
Referee: Rowan Kitt

24 September 2005

Nottingham	10 - 32	Harlequins
	Report

Ireland Avenue
Attendance: 2,744
Referee: Tim Wigglesworth

24 September 2005

Sedgley Park	33 - 33	Pertemps Bees
	Report

Park Lane
Attendance: 375
Referee: Chris Sharp

=== Round 5 ===
1 October 2005

Bedford Blues	31 - 12	Cornish Pirates
	Report

Goldington Road
Attendance: 2,477
Referee: Llyr Apgeraint-Roberts

1 October 2005

Earth Titans	17 - 10	Exeter Chiefs
	Report

Clifton Lane
Attendance: 1,000
Referee: Bruce Robertson

1 October 2005

Harlequins	27 - 7	Doncaster
	Report

The Stoop
Attendance: 7,576
Referee: Steve Lander

1 October 2005

Nottingham	22 - 16	London Welsh
	Report

Ireland Avenue
Attendance: 908
Referee: Dale Newitt

1 October 2005

Otley	33 - 27	Sedgley Park
	Report

Cross Green
Attendance: 916
Referee: Carlo Damasco

1 October 2005

Pertemps Bees	29 - 7	Coventry
	Report

Sharmans Cross
Referee: Tim Beddow

1 October 2005

Plymouth Albion	41 - 52	Newbury
	Report

Brickfields
Attendance: 2,424
Referee: Nick Williams

=== Round 6 ===
8 October 2005

Bedford Blues	24 - 16	Earth Titans
	Report

Goldington Road
Attendance: 2,287
Referee: Carlo Damasco

8 October 2005

Coventry	18 - 36	Harlequins
	Report

Butts Park Arena
Attendance: 4,612
Referee: Andrew Small

8 October 2005

Doncaster	14 - 9	Plymouth Albion
	Report

Castle Park
Attendance: 859
Referee: Rowan Kitt

8 October 2005

Exeter Chiefs	38 - 22	Pertemps Bees
	Report

County Ground
Attendance: 1,287
Referee: Geraint Ashton-Jones

8 October 2005

London Welsh	24 - 28	Otley
	Report

Old Deer Park
Attendance: 800
Referee: Alan Biggs

9 October 2005

Cornish Pirates	29 - 20	Nottingham
	Report

Kenywn Ground
Attendance: 2,800
Referee: Tim Beddow

9 October 2005

Newbury	38 - 14	Sedgley Park
	Report

Monk's Lane
Attendance: 854
Referee: Richard Draper

=== Round 7 ===
22 October 2005

Coventry	7 - 13	Plymouth Albion
	Report

Butts Park Arena
Attendance: 1,742
Referee: Tim Beddow

22 October 2005

Earth Titans	38 - 23	Newbury
	Report

Clifton Lane
Attendance: 920
Referee: Andrew Vertigan

22 October 2005

Harlequins	70 - 5	Exeter Chiefs
	Report

The Stoop
Attendance: 9,153
Referee: Ashley Rowden

22 October 2005

Nottingham	10 - 25	Bedford Blues
	Report

Ireland Avenue
Attendance: 1,540
Referee: Gareth Copsey

22 October 2005

Otley	24 - 16	Doncaster
	Report

Cross Green
Attendance: 1,267
Referee: David Rosich

22 October 2005

Pertemps Bees	24 - 36	Cornish Pirates
	Report

Sharmans Cross
Attendance: 650
Referee: Chris Sharp

22 October 2005

Sedgley Park	32 - 28	London Welsh
	Report

Park Lane
Attendance: 475
Referee: Tim Wigglesworth

=== Round 8 ===
29 October 2005

Bedford Blues	35 - 18	Pertemps Bees
	Report

Goldington Road
Attendance: 2,097
Referee: Tim Beddow

29 October 2005

Earth Titans	7 - 22	Harlequins
	Report

Clifton Lane
Attendance: 2,250
Referee: Bruce Robertson

29 October 2005

Exeter Chiefs	19 - 18	Nottingham
	Report

County Ground
Attendance: 1,261
Referee: Dale Newitt

29 October 2005

London Welsh	27 - 27	Doncaster
	Report

Old Deer Park
Attendance: 750
Referee: Geraint Ashton-Jones

29 October 2005

Newbury	24 - 36	Coventry
	Report

Monk's Lane
Attendance: 878
Referee: Alan Biggs

29 October 2005

Plymouth Albion	33 - 3	Otley
	Report

Brickfields
Attendance: 2,415
Referee: David Rose

30 October 2005

Cornish Pirates	53 - 8	Sedgley Park
	Report

Kenwyn Ground
Attendance: 2,433
Referee: Llyr Apgeraint-Roberts

=== Round 9 ===
12 November 2005

Bedford Blues	P - P	Exeter Chiefs

- Postponed. Game rescheduled to 17 December 2005.

12 November 2005

Doncaster	26 - 16	Newbury
	Report

Castle Park
Attendance: 911
Referee: Gareth Copsey

12 November 2005

London Welsh	18 - 29	Plymouth Albion
	Report

Old Deer Park
Attendance: 750
Referee: Romain Poite

12 November 2005

Nottingham	26 - 27	Coventry
	Report

Ireland Avenue
Attendance: 905
Referee: Andrew Vertigan

12 November 2005

Pertemps Bees	26 - 27	Earth Titans
	Report

Sharmans Cross
Referee: Tim Hayes

12 November 2005

Sedgley Park	22 - 29	Harlequins
	Report

Park Lane
Attendance: 1,475
Referee: Llyr Apgeraint-Roberts

13 November 2005

Cornish Pirates	39 - 22	Otley
	Report

Kenwyn Ground
Attendance: 2,600
Referee: Nick Williams

=== Round 10 ===
19 November 2005

Earth Titans	25 - 19	Doncaster
	Report

Clifton Lane
Attendance: 2,000
Referee: Llyr Apgeraint-Roberts

19 November 2005

Exeter Chiefs	47 - 10	Sedgley Park
	Report

County Ground
Attendance: 1,005
Referee: Rowan Kitt

19 November 2005

Newbury	40 - 37	Nottingham
	Report

Monk's Lane
Attendance: 408
Referee: Richard Draper

19 November 2005

Otley	19 - 22	Pertemps Bees
	Report

Cross Green
Referee: Chris Sharp

19 November 2005

Plymouth Albion	28 - 23	Bedford Blues
	Report

Brickfields
Attendance: 1,953
Referee: Nick Williams

20 November 2005

Coventry	26 - 18	London Welsh
	Report

Butts Park Arena
Attendance: 1,752

20 November 2005

Harlequins	50 - 6	Cornish Pirates
	Report

The Stoop
Attendance: 10,843
Referee: Tim Wigglesworth

=== Round 11 ===
2 December 2005

Nottingham	12 - 0	Doncaster
	Report

Ireland Avenue
Attendance: 1,200
Referee: Llyr Apgeraint-Roberts

3 December 2005

Bedford Blues	20 - 26	Harlequins
	Report

Goldington Road
Attendance: 5,500
Referee: Martin Fox

3 December 2005

Exeter Chiefs	8 - 12	Otley
	Report

County Ground
Attendance: 1,176
Referee: Tim Beddow

3 December 2005

London Welsh	13 - 7	Earth Titans
	Report

Old Deer Park
Attendance: 900
Referee: Geraint Ashton-Jones

3 December 2005

Pertemps Bees	22 - 22	Newbury
	Report

Sharmans Cross
Referee: Dean Richards

3 December 2005

Sedgley Park	8 - 25	Plymouth Albion
	Report

Park Lane
Attendance: 475
Referee: Dale Newitt

4 December 2005

Cornish Pirates	15 - 10	Coventry
	Report

Kenwyn Ground
Attendance: 2,000
Referee: Gareth Copsey

=== Round 12 ===
10 December 2005

Coventry	19 - 24	Exeter Chiefs
	Report

Butts Park Arena
Attendance: 1,640
Referee: Chris Sharp

10 December 2005

Doncaster	31 - 27	Pertemps Bees
	Report

Castle Park
Attendance: 1,001
Referee: Tim Wigglesworth

10 December 2005

London Welsh	17 - 20	Cornish Pirates
	Report

Old Deer Park
Attendance: 1,450
Referee: Rowan Kitts

10 December 2005

Earth Titans	32 - 11	Sedgley Park
	Report

Clifton Lane
Referee: Bruce Robertson

10 December 2005

Newbury	17 - 50	Bedford Blues
	Report

Monk's Lane
Attendance: 840
Referee: Geraint Ashton-Jones

10 December 2005

Otley	29 - 20	Nottingham
	Report

Cross Green
Attendance: 780
Referee: Dean Richards

10 December 2005

Plymouth Albion	16 - 23	Harlequins
	Report

Brickfields
Attendance: 5,551
Referee: Llyr Apgeraint-Roberts

=== Round 9 (rescheduled game) ===
17 December 2005

Bedford Blues	28 - 13	Exeter Chiefs
	Report

Goldington Road
Attendance: 1,915
Referee: Dale Newitt

=== Round 13 ===
26 December 2005

Harlequins	47 - 23	London Welsh
	Report

The Stoop
Attendance: 10,155
Referee: Steve Lander

26 December 2005

Otley	17 - 22	Earth Titans
	Report

Cross Green
Attendance: 1,987
Referee: Tim Wigglesworth

26 December 2005

Plymouth Albion	23 - 26	Cornish Pirates
	Report

Brickfields
Attendance: 5,672
Referee: David Rose

27 December 2005

Coventry	24 - 31	Bedford Blues
	Report

Butts Park Arena
Attendance: 3,000
Referee: Martin Fox

27 December 2005

Doncaster	33 - 20	Sedgley Park
	Report

Castle Park
Attendance: 1,236
Referee: Chris Sharp

27 December 2005

Newbury	37 - 35	Exeter Chiefs
	Report

Monk's Lane
Attendance: 952
Referee: Alan Biggs

27 December 2005

Nottingham	30 - 8	Pertemps Bees
	Report

Ireland Avenue
Attendance: 1,103
Referee: Dale Newitt

=== Round 14 ===
31 December 2005

Earth Titans	P - P	Nottingham

- Postponed. Game rescheduled to 4 February 2006.

31 December 2005

Exeter Chiefs	0 - 7	Plymouth Albion
	Report

County Ground
Attendance: 3,192
Referee: Tim Beddow

31 December 2005

London Welsh	25 - 3	Newbury
	Report

Old Deer Park
Attendance: 1,030
Referee: Nick Williams

31 December 2005

Sedgley Park	22 - 19	Coventry
	Report

Park Lane
Attendance: 435
Referee: Llyr Apgeraint-Roberts

2 January 2006

Bedford Blues	42 - 20	Otley
	Report

Goldington Road
Attendance: 2,829
Referee: Rowan Kitt

2 January 2006

Cornish Pirates	43 - 26	Doncaster
	Report

Kenwyn Ground
Attendance: 2,643
Referee: David Rose

2 January 2006

Harlequins	42 - 3	Pertemps Bees
	Report

The Stoop
Attendance: 8,550
Referee: Dean Richards

=== Round 15 ===
14 January 2006

Doncaster	17 - 24	Bedford Blues
	Report

Castle Park
Attendance: 1,177
Referee: Dale Newitt

14 January 2006

Earth Titans	44 - 29	Coventry
	Report

Clifton Lane
Attendance: 1,040
Referee: Ashley Rowden

14 January 2006

Harlequins	43 - 3	Otley
	Report

The Stoop
Attendance: 8,092
Referee: David Rose

14 January 2006

London Welsh	23 - 16	Exeter Chiefs
	Report

Old Deer Park
Attendance: 830
Referee: Gareth Copsey

14 January 2006

Nottingham	23 - 16	Sedgley Park
	Report

Ireland Avenue
Attendance: 1,129
Referee: Greg Garner

14 January 2006

Plymouth Albion	34 - 21	Pertemps Bees
	Report

Brickfields
Attendance: 2,658
Referee: Andrew Vertigan

15 January 2006

Cornish Pirates	30 - 10	Newbury
	Report

Kenwyn Ground
Attendance: 2,689
Referee: Rowan Kitt

=== Round 16 ===
21 January 2006

Earth Titans	41 - 7	Cornish Pirates
	Report

Clifton Lane
Attendance: 2,000
Referee: Llyr Apgeraint-Roberts

21 January 2006

Exeter Chiefs	31 - 5	Doncaster
	Report

County Ground
Attendance: 1,454
Referee: David Rose

21 January 2006

Nottingham	21 - 15	Plymouth Albion
	Report

Ireland Avenue
Attendance: 1,011
Referee: Tim Beddow

21 January 2006

Otley	24 - 27	Coventry
	Report

Cross Green
Attendance: 572
Referee: Bruce Robertson

21 January 2006

Newbury	25 - 27	Harlequins
	Report

Monk's Lane
Attendance: 3,362
Referee: Sean Davey

21 January 2006

Pertemps Bees	26 - 10	London Welsh
	Report

Sharmans Cross
Attendance: 700
Referee: Greg Garner

21 January 2006

Sedgley Park	29 - 45	Bedford Blues
	Report

Park Lane
Attendance: 475
Referee: Terry Hall

=== Round 17 ===
28 January 2006

Bedford Blues	38 - 17	London Welsh
	Report

Goldington Road
Attendance: 2,397
Referee: Dale Newitt

28 January 2006

Coventry	37 - 24	Doncaster
	Report

Butts Park Arena
Attendance: 2,198
Referee: Richard Draper

28 January 2006

Harlequins	31 - 16	Nottingham
	Report

The Stoop
Attendance: 8,231
Referee: Rowan Kitt

28 January 2006

Otley	51 - 14	Newbury
	Report

Cross Green
Attendance: 907
Referee: Martin Fox

28 January 2006

Pertemps Bees	12 - 6	Sedgley Park
	Report

Sharmans Cross
Attendance: 500
Referee: Gareth Copsey

28 January 2006

Plymouth Albion	15 - 14	Earth Titans
	Report

Brickfields
Attendance: 2,905
Referee: Dean Richards

29 January 2006

Cornish Pirates	16 - 23	Exeter Chiefs
	Report

Kenwyn Ground
Attendance: 2,905
Referee: Tim Wigglesworth

=== Round 14 (rescheduled game) ===
4 February 2006

Earth Titans	32 - 23	Nottingham
	Report

Clifton Lane
Attendance: 1,000
Referee: Tim Wigglesworth

=== Round 18 ===
11 February 2006

Coventry	30 - 29	Pertemps Bees
	Report

Butts Park Arena
Attendance: 1,474
Referee: Bruce Robertson

11 February 2006

Exeter Chiefs	29 - 23	Earth Titans
	Report

County Ground
Attendance: 1,204
Referee: Nick Williams

11 February 2006

London Welsh	30 - 21	Nottingham
	Report

Old Deer Park
Attendance: 650
Referee: Andrew Vertigan

11 February 2006

Newbury	27 - 18	Plymouth Albion
	Report

Monk's Lane
Attendance: 720
Referee: Rowan Kitt

11 February 2006

Sedgley Park	7 - 19	Otley
	Report

Park Lane
Attendance: 425
Referee: Chris Sharp

12 February 2006

Cornish Pirates	26 - 21	Bedford Blues
	Report

Kenywn Ground
Attendance: 2,657
Referee: Tim Beddow

12 February 2006

Doncaster	0 - 45	Harlequins
	Report

Castle Park
Attendance: 2,768
Referee: Llyr Apgeraint-Roberts

=== Round 19 ===
18 February 2006

Earth Titans	9 - 31	Bedford Blues
	Report

Clifton Lane
Attendance: 1,200
Referee: Chris Sharp

18 February 2006

Harlequins	52 - 12	Coventry
	Report

The Stoop
Attendance: 8,950
Referee: Tim Wigglesworth

18 February 2006

Nottingham	18 - 16	Cornish Pirates
	Report

Ireland Avenue
Attendance: 1,147
Referee: Dale Newitt

18 February 2006

Otley	25 - 28	London Welsh
	Report

Cross Green
Attendance: 812
Referee: Andrew Small

18 February 2006

Pertemps Bees	23 - 16	Exeter Chiefs
	Report

Sharmans Cross
Attendance: 650
Referee: Dean Richards

18 February 2006

Plymouth Albion	27 - 25	Doncaster
	Report

Brickfields
Attendance: 2,238
Referee: Greg Garner

18 February 2006

Sedgley Park	35 - 35	Newbury
	Report

Park Lane
Attendance: 325
Referee: Bruce Robertson

=== Round 20 ===
25 February 2006

Bedford Blues	21 - 26	Nottingham
	Report

Goldington Road
Attendance: 1,941
Referee: Richard Draper

25 February 2006

Doncaster	24 - 12	Otley
	Report

Castle Park
Attendance: 1,038
Referee: Bruce Robertson

25 February 2006

Exeter Chiefs	13 - 8	Harlequins
	Report

County Ground
Attendance: 3,645
Referee: Dale Newitt

25 February 2006

London Welsh	44 - 33	Sedgley Park
	Report

Old Deer Park
Attendance: 510
Referee: Llyr Apgeraint-Roberts

25 February 2006

Newbury	P - P	Earth Titans

- Postponed. Game rescheduled to 4 March 2006.

25 February 2006

Plymouth Albion	34 - 27	Coventry
	Report

Brickfields
Attendance: 2,170
Referee: Rowan Kitt

26 February 2006

Cornish Pirates	P - P	Pertemps Bees

- Postponed. Game rescheduled to 5 March 2006.

=== Round 20 (rescheduled games) ===
4 March 2006

Newbury	17 - 36	Earth Titans
	Report

Monk's Lane
Attendance: 652
Referee: Gareth Copsey

5 March 2006

Cornish Pirates	21 - 13	Pertemps Bees
	Report

Kenwyn Ground
Attendance: 1,814
Referee: Nick Williams

=== Round 21 ===
11 March 2006

Coventry	45 - 29	Newbury
	Report

Butts Park Arena
Attendance: 1,878
Referee: Terry Hall

11 March 2006

Doncaster	30 - 11	London Welsh
	Report

Castle Park
Attendance: 958
Referee: Gareth Copsey

11 March 2006

Harlequins	50 - 10	Earth Titans
	Report

The Stoop
Attendance: 7,823
Referee: Steve Lander

11 March 2006

Nottingham	49 - 34	Exeter Chiefs
	Report

Ireland Avenue
Attendance: 574
Referee: Alan Biggs

11 March 2006

Otley	15 - 14	Plymouth Albion
	Report

Cross Green
Attendance: 862
Referee: Dale Newitt

11 March 2006

Pertemps Bees	16 - 68	Bedford Blues
	Report

Sharmans Cross
Referee: Andrew Vertigan

11 March 2006

Sedgley Park	31 - 21	Cornish Pirates
	Report

Park Lane
Attendance: 470
Referee: Tim Beddow

=== Round 22 ===
25 March 2006

Bedford Blues	34 - 28	Plymouth Albion
	Report

Goldington Road
Attendance: 2,348
Referee: Gareth Copsey

25 March 2006

London Welsh	32 - 13	Coventry
	Report

Old Deer Park
Attendance: 1,260
Referee: Rowan Kitt

25 March 2006

Nottingham	35 - 17	Newbury
	Report

Ireland Avenue
Attendance: 966
Referee: Nick Williams

25 March 2006

Pertemps Bees	12 - 33	Otley
	Report

Sharmans Cross
Referee: Bruce Robertson

25 March 2006

Sedgley Park	36 - 28	Exeter Chiefs
	Report

Park Lane
Attendance: 425
Referee: Llyr Apgeraint-Roberts

26 March 2006

Cornish Pirates	8 - 29	Harlequins
	Report

Kenwyn Ground
Attendance: 5,879
Referee: Roy Maybank

26 March 2006

Doncaster	35 - 24	Earth Titans
	Report

Castle Park
Attendance: 1,869
Referee: Tim Wigglesworth

=== Round 23 ===
1 April 2006

Coventry	29 - 19	Nottingham
	Report

Butts Park Arena
Attendance: 2,206
Referee: Tim Wigglesworth

1 April 2006

Earth Titans	58 - 20	Pertemps Bees
	Report

Clifton Lane
Attendance: 1,200
Referee: Gareth Copsey

1 April 2006

Exeter Chiefs	26 - 23	Bedford Blues
	Report

Count Ground
Attendance: 1,535
Referee: Dale Newitt

1 April 2006

Harlequins	65 - 8	Sedgley Park
	Report

The Stoop
Attendance: 7,938
Referee: Rowan Kitt

1 April 2006

Otley	7 - 13	Cornish Pirates
	Report

Cross Green
Attendance: 749
Referee: Steve Lander

1 April 2006

Plymouth Albion	31 - 10	London Welsh
	Report

Brickfields
Attendance: 2,476
Referee: Ashley Rowden

2 April 2006

Newbury	11 - 30	Doncaster
	Report

Monk's Lane
Attendance: 475
Referee: Bruce Robertson

=== Round 25 (rescheduled game) ===
8 April 2006

Earth Titans	55 - 10	London Welsh
	Report

Clifton Lane
Attendance: 1,200
Referee: Greg Garner

- Game brought forward from 15 April 2006.

=== Round 24 ===
15 April 2006

Bedford Blues	40 - 27	Coventry
	Report

Goldington Road
Attendance: 2,025
Referee: Rob Debney

15 April 2006

Earth Titans	39 - 24	Otley
	Report

Clifton Lane
Attendance: 1,500
Referee: Chris Sharp

15 April 2006

Exeter Chiefs	36 - 24	Newbury
	Report

County Ground
Attendance: 1,457
Referee: Alan Biggs

15 April 2006

London Welsh	17 - 28	Harlequins
	Report

Old Deer Park
Attendance: 5,120
Referee: Gareth Copsey

15 April 2006

Pertemps Bees	18 - 36	Nottingham
	Report

Sharmans Cross
Referee: Geraint Ashton-Jones

15 April 2006

Sedgley Park	31 - 19	Doncaster
	Report

Park Lane
Attendance: 482
Referee: Bruce Robertson

16 April 2006

Cornish Pirates	29 - 28	Plymouth Albion
	Report

Kenwyn Ground
Attendance: 3,850
Referee: Tim Wigglesworth

=== Round 25 ===
22 April 2006

Coventry	21 - 28	Cornish Pirates
	Report

Butts Park Arena
Attendance: 2,147
Referee: Tim Beddow

22 April 2006

Doncaster	31 - 36	Nottingham
	Report

Castle Park
Referee: Greg Garner

22 April 2006

Earth Titans	P - P	London Welsh

- Rescheduled. Game brought forward to 8 April 2006.

22 April 2006

Harlequins	45 - 36	Bedford Blues
	Report

The Stoop
Attendance: 9,120
Referee: Rob Debney

22 April 2006

Otley	22 - 25	Exeter Chiefs
	Report

Cross Green
Attendance: 1,427
Referee: Ashley Rowden

22 April 2006

Plymouth Albion	55 - 7	Sedgley Park
	Report

Brickfields
Attendance: 2,536
Referee: Richard Phillips

24 April 2006

Newbury	0 - 0	Pertemps Bees
	Report

Monk's Lane

- Newbury were awarded a 0–0 win and 4 league points following this match. Pertemps Bees won the match by 35 pts to 22 pts but due to a severe injury crisis had to field three unregistered players with the prior approval of FDR in order to fulfil the fixture. All points gained by either side in the match will be disregarded for the purpose of the official league table in accordance with the RFU Regulations.

=== Round 26 ===
29 April 2006

Bedford Blues	79 - 22	Newbury
	Report

Goldington Road
Attendance: 2,481
Referee: Steve Lander

29 April 2006

Cornish Pirates	36 - 13	London Welsh
	Report

Kenwyn Road
Attendance: 1,724
Referee: Nick Williams

29 April 2006

Exeter Chiefs	45 - 5	Coventry

County Ground
Attendance: 3,575
Referee: Dale Newitt

29 April 2006

Harlequins	39 - 15	Plymouth Albion
	Report

The Stoop
Attendance: 12,500
Referee: Rowan Kitt

29 April 2006

Nottingham	22 - 26	Otley
	Report

Ireland Avenue
Attendance: 2,070
Referee: Terry Hall

29 April 2006

Pertemps Bees	29 - 31	Doncaster
	Report

Sharmans Cross
Referee: Tim Beddow

29 April 2006

Sedgley Park	31 - 31	Earth Titans
	Report

Park Lane
Attendance: 745
Referee: Eric Gauzins

== Season attendances ==
Club	Home Games	Total	Average	Highest	Lowest	% Capacity
Bedford Blues	13	31,358	2,412	5,500	1,477	44%
Cornish Pirates	13	36,194	2,784	5,879	1,724	48%
Coventry	12 (Note: Missing home attendance v Earth Titans on 10 September 2005.)	25,513	2,126	4,612	1,381	52%
Doncaster	12 (Note: Missing home attendance v Coventry on 24 September 2005.)	13,768	1,252	2,768	738	41%
Earth Titans	12 (Note: Missing home attendance v Sedgley Park on 10 December 2005.)	16,430	1,369	2,250	920	55%
Exeter Chiefs	13	24,238	1,864	3,645	1,005	32%
Harlequins	13	116,948	8,996	12,500	7,576	87%
London Welsh	13	16,340	1,257	5,120	510	28%
Newbury	12 (Note: Missing home attendance v Pertemps Bees on 24 April 2006.)	11,704	975	3,362	475	11%
Nottingham	12 (Note: Missing home attendance v Earth Titans on 3 September 2005.)	15,297	1,275	3,417	572	26%
Otley	12 (Note: Missing home attendance v Pertemps Bees on 19 November 2005.)	14,546	1,212	3,417	572	17%
Pertemps Bees	6 (Note: Missing home attendances v Coventry on 1 October 2005, Earth Titans on 12 November 2005, Newbury on 3 December 2005, Bedford Blues on 11 March 2006, Otley on 25 March 2006, Nottingham on 15 April 2006 and Doncaster on 29 April 2006.)	5,475	913	2,475	500	26%
Plymouth Albion	13	40,453	3,112	5,672	1,953	48%
Sedgley Park	12 (Note: Missing home attendance v Nottingham on 10 September 2005.)	6,582	549	1,475	325	18%

== Leading scorers ==
- Note that points scorers includes tries as well as conversions, penalties and drop goals.

=== Top points scorers ===
Rank	Player	Team	Appearances	Points
1	(England) James Moore	Coventry	25	251
2	(New Zealand) Blair Feeney	Newbury	20	225
3	(England) Phil Jones	Sedgley Park	23	219
4	(England) Mark Harris	Bedford Blues	16	204
5	(England) Michael Whitehead	Earth Titans	23	200
6	(New Zealand) Andrew Mehrtens	Harlequins	20	189
7	(Scotland) Neil Stenhouse	Nottingham	21	166
8	(England) Tony Yapp	Exeter Chiefs	17	158
9	(England) Simon Binns	Otley	15	143
10	(England) Alastair Hepher	Bedford Blues	23	142

=== Top try scorers ===
Rank	Player	Team	Appearances	Tries
1	(England) Scott Donald	Earth Titans	26	20
2	(Ireland) Simon Keogh	Harlequins	25	18
3	(England) Ugo Monye	Harlequins	18	16
3	(England) Nick Easter	Harlequins	25	16
4	(England) Jon Feeley	Sedgley Park	23	15
4	(England) Richard Welding	Cornish Pirates	25	15
4	(England) Tom Williams	Harlequins	18	12
4	(France) Nicolas Sestaret	Plymouth Albion	26	12
5	(United States) Chris Wyles	Nottingham	19	11
5	(England) Kevin James	Cornish Pirates	22	11
5	(Wales) Gareth Swailes	London Welsh	22	11

== Season records ==
=== Team ===
Largest home win — 65 pts

70 - 5 Harlequins at home to Exeter Chiefs on 22 October 2005

Largest away win — 52 pts

68 - 16 Bedford Blues away to Pertemps Bees on 11 March 2006

Most points scored — 79 pts

79 - 22 Bedford Blues at home to Newbury on 29 April 2006

Most tries in a match — 12 (x2)

Harlequins at home to Exeter Chiefs on 22 October 2005
Bedford Blues at home to Newbury on 29 April 2006

Most conversions in a match — 9

Bedford Blues at home to Newbury on 29 April 2006

Most penalties in a match — 7

Coventry at home to Newbury on 11 March 2006

Most drop goals in a match — 2

Plymouth Albion at home to Exeter Chiefs on 3 September 2005

=== Player ===
Most points in a match — 34

(England) Alastair Hepher for Bedford Blues at home to Newbury on 29 April 2006

Most tries in a match — 5 (x2)

(England) Richard Welding for Cornish Pirates at home to Earth Titans on 18 September 2005
(England) Ugo Monye for Harlequins at home to Exeter Chiefs on 22 October 2005

Most conversions in a match — 9

(England) Alastair Hepher for Bedford Blues at home to Newbury on 29 April 2006

Most penalties in a match — 7

(England) James Moore for Coventry at home to Newbury on 11 March 2006

Most drop goals in a match — 1

N/A - multiple players

=== Attendances ===
Highest — 12,500

Harlequins at home to Plymouth Albion on 29 April 2006

Lowest — 325 (Note: As there are a number of attendances missing this season it is possible that there were lower attendances than the one recorded.)

Sedgley Park at home to Newbury on 18 February 2006

Highest Average Attendance — 8,996

Harlequins

Lowest Average Attendance — 549 (Note: As Sedgley Park had 1 home game missing from the attendance statistics this figure is not 100% accurate.)

Orrell

== See also ==
- English rugby union system
