= Benjamin Russell =

Benjamin Russell may refer to:

- Benjamin Russell (artist) (1804–1885), American artist
- Benjamin Russell (journalist) (1761–1845), American, originator of expression Era of Good Feeling
- Benjamin Russell (Canadian politician) (1849–1935), Canadian Liberal politician
- Benjamin E. Russell (1845–1909), U.S. Representative from Georgia
- Ben Russell (filmmaker) (born 1976), American experimental filmmaker
- Ben Russell (rugby union, born 1983), English rugby player
- Ben Russell (rugby union, born 1984), English rugby player
