= 2018–19 Cornish Pirates RFC season =

English rugby union club season

The 2018–19 season is the Cornish Pirates 16th season in the second tier of the English rugby union league system, the RFU Championship and their first season in the Championship Cup.

== Pre–season friendlies ==
Match	Date	Opponents	H / A	Result	Score	Attendance	Scorers	Against	Report
1	11 August	Aberavon Wizards	A	W	44 – 7		Tries: Duncan (2), Evans, Wedlake, Moyle, Holden, Caulfield, Cant; Cons: Cargill (2).	1 try 1 con	
2	17 August	Exeter Chiefs	H	W	29 – 21		Tries: Patterson, Matavesi (2), Judge; Cons: Cargill (3); Pen: Cargill	3 tries 3 con	
3	25 August	Plymouth Albion	A	W	29 – 12		Tries: Holden, O’Meara, Koster, Clemson; Con: Skinner (3); Pen: Skinner	1 try 1 pen try	

== RFU Championship ==
Match	Date	Opponents	H / A	Result	Score	Attendance	Scorers	Against	Lge pos	Report
1	2 September	Doncaster Knights	H	W	31 – 24	1,591	Tries: Matavesi (9,28), Parata (37), Duncan (66); Con: Cargill (9,28,38,69); Pen: Cargill (75)	3 tries 3 con 1 pen	1st	
2	9 September	Coventry	H	W	35 – 10	1,648	Tries: Duncan (13, 67), Strong (39), Matevesi (70); Con: Cargill (14, 40), Skinner (71); Pen: Cargill (3, 32, 50)	1 try 1 con 1 pen	1st	
3	15 September	Hartpury College	A	W	46 – 17	973	Tries: Wedlake (17, 32, 57, 62), Patterson (20), Cargill (46), Skinner (78); Cons: Cargill (17, 20, 32), Skinner (78); Pen: Cargill (37)	3 tries 1 con	1st	
4	23 September	Richmond	H	W	29 – 19					

=== Table ===
2018–19 RFU Championship table
Pos	Team	Pld	W	D	L	PF	PA	PD	TB	LB	Pts	Qualification
1	London Irish (C)	22	20	0	2	835	340	+495	18	1	99	Promotion place
2	Ealing Trailfinders	22	17	0	5	733	503	+230	16	2	86	
3	Bedford Blues	22	13	0	9	632	603	+29	11	6	69	
4	Jersey Reds	22	12	0	10	554	442	+112	9	6	63	
5	Cornish Pirates	22	10	0	12	556	507	+49	12	7	59	
6	Yorkshire Carnegie	22	11	0	11	475	549	−74	8	3	55	
7	Nottingham	22	10	1	11	508	597	−89	7	3	52	
8	Coventry	22	9	1	12	497	637	−140	7	6	51	
9	London Scottish	22	8	0	14	468	616	−148	7	4	43	
10	Doncaster Knights	22	8	0	14	546	617	−71	6	4	42	
11	Hartpury College	22	7	0	15	415	634	−219	4	4	36	
12	Richmond (R)	22	6	0	16	430	604	−174	4	5	33	Relegation place

Updated to match(es) played on 21 April 2019. Source: "Greene King IPA Championship". England Rugby.
Rules for classification: If teams are level at any stage, tiebreakers are applied in the following order:
1. Number of matches won
2. Difference between points for and against
3. Total number of points for
4. Aggregate number of points scored in matches between tied teams
5. Number of matches won excluding the first match, then the second and so on until the tie is settled
