= Richard G.R. Evans =

British-Kenyan businessman

Sir Richard Grenville Russell Evans KCMG
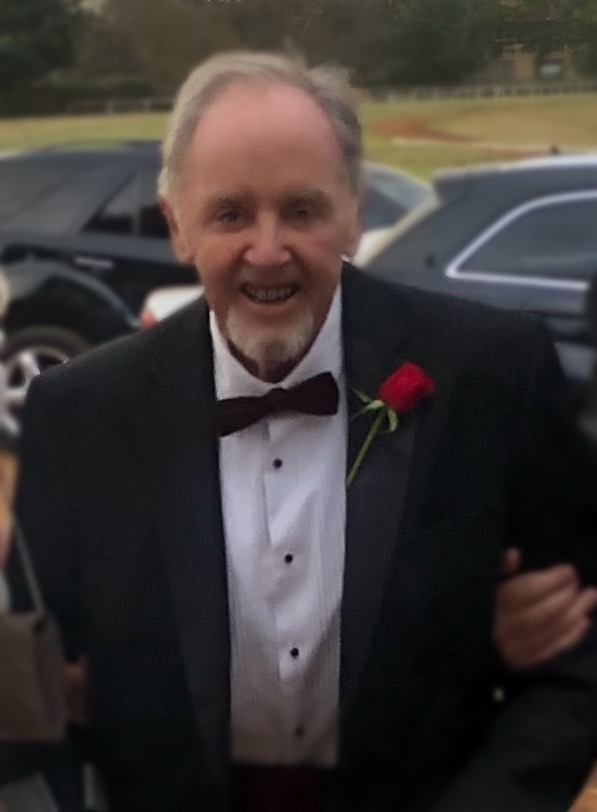
- Other names: Dicky
- Citizenship: United Kingdom, Kenya
- Education: King's College London
- Website: Official website

Sir Richard Grenville Russell Evans KCMG is a British-Kenyan businessperson, sports team owner and philanthropist. Evans was born in Penzance and played school rugby for the county before moving to East Africa, where he also represented Kenya in rugby. Charles III knighted Evans in his 2024 New Year Honours ceremony.

== Education ==
Evans studied civil engineering at King's College London and graduated in 1967.

== Career ==
In 1969 Evans became a consulting engineer for the United Nations and the World Bank in Uganda, moving to Kenya in 1971 where he set up a horticultural business, Homegrown Ltd in 1982. He went on to establish the Hemingways Collection of hotels in Kenya for which he remains chairman.

In 1997 when managing director of Homegrown Ltd, he was appointed by President Moi of Kenya to be a member of a Presidential Economic Commission.

Evans took control of Penzance & Newlyn RFC in 1995 when the team was competing in the Western county league and struggling with financial problems. The team became the Cornish Pirates under his backing and rose through the National Leagues.

Evans handed over the club to its shareholders and a seven-person board of directors on 1 July 2014. However, he returned to the club in 2016 after it experienced further financial difficulties. Evans bought Truro City F.C. in 2019. The club was promoted to the National League (South) at the end of the 2022/23 season and was sold to a Canadian company during the 2023/24 season.

== Honours ==
On 1 January 2024, Evans was appointed a Knight Commander of the Order of St Michael and St George, a knighthood offered to British citizens for service overseas, in recognition of his services to business, sport and charity in Kenya and Cornwall.

In 2013 Evans was appointed as a Cornish bard in recognition of his contribution to Cornish culture and given the Cornish name Morlader Pensans, The Pirate of Penzance.

On 12 December 1996 Evans was awarded the Order of the Grand Warrior of Kenya for his services to agribusiness.
