= 2021–22 RFU Championship =

Rugby union competition in England

- Countries: England; Jersey
- Number of teams: 11
- Date: 17 September 2021 — 2 April 2022
- Champions: Ealing Trailfinders
- Runners-up: Doncaster Knights
- Matches played: 110
- Attendance: 141,606 (average 1,287 per match)
- Highest attendance: 4,153 – Bedford Blues v Jersey Reds, 26 December 2021
- Lowest attendance: 321 – Ampthill v Richmond, 19 February 2022
- Tries scored: 794 (average 7.2 per match)
- Top point scorer: 150 – James Williams (Hartpury)
- Top try scorer: 17 – Mark Bright (Richmond); Eoghan Clarke (Jersey Reds)

The 2021–22 RFU Championship was the thirteenth season of the RFU Championship, the professional second tier of rugby union in England. It featured ten English teams and one from Jersey. Saracens are the reigning champions and were promoted to the Premiership.

== Structure ==
In a return to the structure used prior to 2020–21, the eleven teams played each of the other teams twice. There was no end of season play-off and as no team met the minimum standards criteria, no team was promoted to Premiership Rugby. For the second consecutive year no team was relegated from the league.

== RFU funding ==
For the second year in a row each club will receive approximately £161,500 in funding from the RFU as part of the reduction of funding introduced ahead of the 2016–17 season. Last season, following news of the funding change, several clubs announced a switch to a semi-professional business model.

== Teams ==
Locations of the 2021–22 RFU Championship teams
Greater London RFU Championship teams

Ten of the eleven teams played in last season's competition. Saracens having beaten Ealing Trailfinders in the 2020–21 final were promoted into Premiership Rugby with no team relegated. London Scottish returned to the league following a one-year hiatus due to the costs associated with the COVID-19 pandemic. They intended to leave the Athletic Ground ahead of this season, however it was later confirmed they would remain at the Athletic Ground.

Club	Stadium	Capacity	Area	Previous season
Ampthill	Dillingham Park	3,000	Ampthill, Bedfordshire	7th
Bedford Blues	Goldington Road	5,000 (1,700 seats)	Bedford, Bedfordshire	8th
Cornish Pirates	Mennaye Field	4,000 (2,200 seats)	Penzance, Cornwall	4th
Coventry	Butts Park Arena	4,000 (3,000 seats)	Coventry, West Midlands	5th
Doncaster Knights	Castle Park	5,183 (1,650 seats) (Note: Ground capacity of Castle Park up from 5,000 (1,650 seats) to 5,183 (1,926 seats) for the 2021–22 season.)	Doncaster, South Yorkshire	3rd
Ealing Trailfinders	Trailfinders Sports Ground	4,000 (2,200 seats)	West Ealing, London	1st (runner up)
Hartpury University	ALPAS Arena	2,000	Hartpury, Gloucestershire	9th
Jersey Reds	Stade Santander International	4,000	Saint Peter, Jersey	6th
London Scottish	Athletic Ground	4,500 (1,000 seats)	Richmond, London	N/A
Nottingham	Lady Bay Sports Ground	3,500	Nottingham, Nottinghamshire	10th
Richmond	Athletic Ground	4,500 (1,000 seats)	Richmond, London	11th

== Table ==
2021–22 RFU Championship table
Pos	Team	Pld	W	D	L	PF	PA	PD	TB	LB	Pts	Qualification
1	Ealing Trailfinders	20	16	0	4	890	336	+554	15	1	80	Championship winners
2	Doncaster Knights	20	17	0	3	524	322	+202	9	0	77	
3	Cornish Pirates	20	14	2	4	521	365	+156	12	1	73	
4	Jersey Reds	20	13	1	6	596	436	+160	12	3	69	
5	Bedford Blues	20	9	0	11	536	503	+33	10	4	50	
6	Ampthill	20	8	2	10	420	511	−91	6	4	46	
7	Hartpury	20	7	1	12	524	515	+9	10	6	46	
8	Coventry	20	9	0	11	468	582	−114	7	2	45	
9	Richmond	20	7	1	12	440	546	−106	7	5	42	
10	Nottingham	20	5	0	15	407	690	−283	6	4	30	
11	London Scottish	20	1	1	18	326	846	−520	3	2	11	

Updated to match(es) played on 2 April 2022. Source: "The Championship". England Rugby.
Rules for classification: If teams are level at any stage, tiebreakers are applied in the following order:
1. Number of matches won
2. Difference between points for and against
3. Total number of points for
4. Aggregate number of points scored in matches between tied teams
5. Number of matches won excluding the first match, then the second and so on until the tie is settled

== Fixtures & results ==
Fixtures for the season were announced by the RFU on 22 July 2021. The season commenced on 17 September and the final round of matches are due to take place in mid-March.

=== Round 1 ===
17 September 2021
19:45

(1 BP) Nottingham	36 – 26	Ampthill (1 BP)

Lady Bay Sports Ground
Attendance: 1,047
Referee: Jack Makepeace

18 September 2021
13:30

(1 BP) Cornish Pirates	33 – 18	Richmond

Mennaye Field
Attendance: 1,263
Referee: Joe James

18 September 2021
14:15

London Scottish	7 – 48	Jersey Reds (1 BP)

Athletic Ground
Attendance: 600
Referee: Neil Chivers

18 September 2021
15:00

(1 BP) Coventry	39 – 22	Doncaster Knights

Butts Park Arena
Attendance: 1,823
Referee: Sara Cox

18 September 2021
15:00

(1 BP) Ealing Trailfinders	54 – 20	Hartpury

Trailfinders Sports Ground
Attendance: 903
Referee: Alex Thomas

Bye/s: Bedford Blues

=== Round 2 ===
25 September 2021
14:30

(1 BP) Doncaster Knights	36 – 7	London Scottish

Castle Park
Attendance: 836
Referee: Joe James

25 September 2021
14:30

(1 BP) Hartpury	37 – 18	Cornish Pirates

ALPAS Arena
Attendance: 1,247
Referee: Anthony Woodthorpe

25 September 2021
14:30

(1 BP) Jersey Reds	40 – 28	Bedford Blues (1 BP)

Stade Santander International
Attendance: 1,359
Referee: Mike Hudson

25 September 2021
15:00

Ampthill	21 – 19	Coventry (1 BP)

Dillingham Park
Attendance: 842
Referee: Andrew Jackson

25 September 2021
15:00

(1 BP) Richmond	27 – 24	Nottingham (1 BP)

Athletic Ground
Attendance: 920
Referee: Alex Thompson

Bye/s: Ealing Trailfinders

=== Round 3 ===
1 October 2021
19:45

Bedford Blues	31 – 23	Doncaster Knights

Goldington Road
Attendance: 2,825
Referee: Nick Wood

1 October 2021
19:45

Nottingham	22 – 20	Hartpury (1 BP)

Lady Bay Sports Ground
Attendance: 937
Referee: Adam Leal

2 October 2021
15:00

Coventry	10 – 5	Richmond (1 BP)

Butts Park Arena
Attendance: 1,453
Referee: Joe James

2 October 2021
15:00

London Scottish	13 – 22	Ampthill

Athletic Ground
Attendance: 500
Referee: George Selwood

3 October 2021
15:00

Cornish Pirates	15 – 12	Ealing Trailfinders (1 BP)

Mennaye Field
Attendance: 1,636
Referee: Sara Cox

Bye/s: Jersey Reds

=== Round 4 ===
8 October 2021
19:45

Hartpury	18 – 7	Coventry

ALPAS Arena
Attendance: 1,194
Referee: Jack Makepeace

9 October 2021
14:30

Doncaster Knights	27 – 24	Jersey Reds (1 BP)

Castle Park
Attendance: 996
Referee: Andrew Jackson

9 October 2021
15:00

(1 BP) Ampthill	34 – 53	Bedford Blues (1 BP)

Dillingham Park
Attendance: 1,924
Referee: Hamish Smales

9 October 2021
15:00

(1 BP) Ealing Trailfinders	78 – 19	Nottingham

Trailfinders Sports Ground
Attendance: 900
Referee: Neil Chivers

9 October 2021
15:00

(1 BP) Richmond	43 – 21	London Scottish

Athletic Ground
Attendance: 1,476
Referee: Mike Hudson

Bye/s: Cornish Pirates

=== Round 5 ===
22 October 2021
19:30

Nottingham	8 – 32	Cornish Pirates (1 BP)

Lady Bay Sports Ground
Attendance: 1,233
Referee: Mike Hudson

23 October 2021
14:30

Jersey Reds	17 – 17	Ampthill

Stade Santander International
Attendance: 941
Referee: Joe James

23 October 2021
15:00

(2 BP) Bedford Blues	32 – 37	Richmond (1 BP)

Goldington Road
Attendance: 2,735
Referee: George Selwood

23 October 2021
15:00

Coventry	24 – 73	Ealing Trailfinders (1 BP)

Butts Park Arena
Attendance: 2,363
Referee: Sara Cox

23 October 2021
15:00

London Scottish	19 – 62	Hartpury (1 BP)

Athletic Ground
Attendance: 475
Referee: Alex Thomas

Bye/s: Doncaster Knights

=== Round 6 ===
30 October 2021
14:00

(1 BP) Ampthill	18 – 20	Doncaster Knights

Dillingham Park
Attendance: 579
Referee: Anthony Woodthorpe

30 October 2021
14:15

(1 BP) Richmond	20 – 26	Jersey Reds

Athletic Ground
Attendance: 855
Referee: Brendon Pickerill

30 October 2021
14:30

(1 BP) Cornish Pirates	40 – 5	Coventry

Mennaye Field
Attendance: 1,897
Referee: Nick Wood

30 October 2021
14:30

Hartpury	19 – 42	Bedford Blues (1 BP)

ALPAS Arena
Attendance: 1,047
Referee: Sara Cox

30 October 2021
15:00

(1 BP) Ealing Trailfinders	101 – 7	London Scottish

Trailfinders Sports Ground
Attendance: 850
Referee: Neil Chivers

Bye/s: Nottingham

=== Round 7 ===
6 November 2021
14:15

( 1 BP) Jersey Reds	32 – 17	Hartpury

Stade Santander International
Attendance: 1,013
Referee: Alexander Thomas

6 November 2021
14:30

(1 BP) Doncaster Knights	37 – 5	Richmond

Castle Park
Attendance: 947
Referee: Neil Chivers

6 November 2021
15:00

Bedford Blues	14 – 50	Ealing Trailfinders ( 1 BP)

Goldington Road
Attendance: 2,172
Referee: Joseph James

6 November 2021
15:00

(1 BP) Coventry	35 – 12	Nottingham

Butts Park Arena
Attendance: 1,804
Referee: Simon Harding

6 November 2021
15:00

(1 BP) London Scottish	17 – 19	Cornish Pirates

Athletic Ground
Attendance: 662
Referee: Harry Walbaum

Bye/s: Ampthill

=== Round 8 ===
19 November 2021
19:45

(1 BP) Nottingham	41 – 31	London Scottish (1 BP)

Lady Bay Sports Ground
Attendance: 1,141
Referee: Charlie Gayther

20 November 2021
12:30

(1 BP) Cornish Pirates	39 – 24	Bedford Blues (1 BP)

Mennaye Field
Attendance: 1,686
Referee: Dan Jones

20 November 2021
13:00

(2 BP) Richmond	36 – 38	Ampthill (1 BP)

Athletic Ground
Attendance: 530
Referee: George Selwood

20 November 2021
13:30

(1 BP) Hartpury	15 – 20	Doncaster Knights

ALPAS Arena
Attendance: 827
Referee: Joe James

20 November 2021
14:00

(1 BP) Ealing Trailfinders	35 – 29	Jersey Reds (2 BP)

Trailfinders Sports Ground
Attendance: 900
Referee: Andrew Jackson

Bye/s: Coventry

=== Round 9 ===
27 November 2021
14:00

(1 BP) Ampthill	24 – 39	Hartpury (1 BP)

Dillingham Park
Attendance: 754
Referee: Michael Hudson

27 November 2021
14:15

Jersey Reds	15 – 5	Cornish Pirates

Stade Santander International
Attendance: 1,803
Referee: Neil Chivers

27 November 2021
14:30

Doncaster Knights	22 – 5	Ealing Trailfinders

Castle Park
Attendance: 703
Referee: Ian Tempest

27 November 2021
15:00

(1 BP) Bedford Blues	40 – 9	Nottingham

Goldington Road
Attendance: 1,083
Referee: Dan Jones

27 November 2021
15:00

(1 BP) London Scottish	36 – 23	Coventry

Athletic Ground
Attendance: 903
Referee: Anthony Woodthorpe

Bye/s: Richmond

=== Round 10 ===
3 December 2021
19:45

Nottingham	P – P	Jersey Reds

Lady Bay Sports Ground

4 December 2021
14:30

(1 BP) Hartpury	38 – 20	Richmond

ALPAS Arena
Attendance: 853
Referee: Neil Chivers

4 December 2021
15:00

Coventry	15 – 14	Bedford Blues (1 BP)

Butts Park Arena
Attendance: 2,047
Referee: Jack Makepeace

4 December 2021
15:00

(1 BP) Ealing Trailfinders	54 – 17	Ampthill

Trailfinders Sports Ground
Attendance: 828
Referee: Dan Jones

5 December 2021
14:30

(1 BP) Cornish Pirates	29 – 7	Doncaster Knights

Mennaye Field
Attendance: 1,630
Referee: Adam Leal

Bye/s: London Scottish

=== Round 11 ===
11 December 2021
13:30

Ampthill	13 – 26	Cornish Pirates (1 BP)

Dillingham Park
Attendance: 508
Referee: Jack Makepeace

11 December 2021
14:30

(1 BP) Doncaster Knights	45 – 12	Nottingham

Castle Park
Attendance: 812
Referee: Sara Cox

11 December 2021
15:00

(1 BP) Bedford Blues	24 – 19	London Scottish (1 BP)

Goldington Road
Attendance: 2,070
Referee: Harry Walbaum

11 December 2021
15:00

(1 BP) Jersey Reds	29 – 24	Coventry (1 BP)

Stade Santander International
Attendance: 1,090
Referee: Adam Leal

11 December 2021
15:00

Richmond	24 – 33	Ealing Trailfinders (1 BP)

Athletic Ground
Attendance: 940
Referee: Joe James

Bye/s: Hartpury

=== Round 12 ===
18 December 2021
14:00

Ampthill	20 – 15	Nottingham (1 BP)

Dillingham Park
Attendance: 539
Referee: George Selwood

18 December 2021
14:30

(1 BP) Doncaster Knights	31 – 9	Coventry

Castle Park
Attendance: 800
Referee: Alexander Thomas

18 December 2021
14:30

Hartpury	P – P	Ealing Trailfinders

ALPAS Arena

18 December 2021
15:00

(1 BP) Jersey Reds	31 – 13	London Scottish

Stade Santander International
Attendance: 1,028
Referee: Nick Wood

18 December 2021
15:00

Richmond	P – P	Cornish Pirates

Athletic Ground

Bye/s: Bedford Blues

=== Round 13 ===
26 December 2021
13:45

(1 BP) Coventry	26 – 22	Ampthill (1 BP)

Butts Park Arena
Attendance: 2,501
Referee: Anthony Woodthorpe

26 December 2021
15:00

Bedford Blues	28 – 19	Jersey Reds

Goldington Road
Attendance: 4,153
Referee: Jack Makepeace

26 December 2021
15:00

London Scottish	19 – 39	Doncaster Knights (1 BP)

Athletic Ground
Attendance: 909
Referee: Adam Leal

26 December 2021
15:00

Nottingham	P – P	Richmond

Lady Bay Sports Ground

26 December 2021
17:00

Cornish Pirates	P – P	Hartpury

Mennaye Field

Bye/s: Ealing Trailfinders

=== Round 14 ===
1 January 2022
13:00

(1 BP) Ampthill	36 – 17	London Scottish

Dillingham Park
Attendance: 749
Referee: Sara Cox

1 January 2022
14:30

Doncaster Knights	P – P	Bedford Blues

Castle Park

1 January 2022
15:00

Ealing Trailfinders	P – P	Cornish Pirates

Trailfinders Sports Ground

2 January 2022
14:30

(1 BP) Hartpury	30 – 26	Nottingham (2 BP)

ALPAS Arena
Attendance: 381
Referee: Sara Cox

2 January 2022
15:00

Richmond	P – P	Coventry

Athletic Ground

Bye/s: Jersey Reds

=== Round 15 ===
14 January 2022
19:45

Nottingham	21 – 34	Ealing Trailfinders (1 BP)

Lady Bay Sports Ground
Attendance: 851
Referee: Jack Makepeace

15 January 2022
15:00

Bedford Blues	10 – 20	Ampthill

Goldington Road
Attendance: 3,431
Referee: Adam Leal

15 January 2022
15:00

(1 BP) Coventry	34 – 33	Hartpury (2 BP)

Butts Park Arena
Attendance: 2,136
Referee: Joe James

15 January 2022
15:00

Jersey Reds	19 – 35	Doncaster Knights (1 BP)

Stade Santander International
Attendance: 1,274
Referee: Sara Cox

15 January 2022
15:00

London Scottish	12 – 31	Richmond (1 BP)

Athletic Ground
Attendance: 1,532
Referee: Nick Wood

Bye/s: Cornish Pirates

=== Round 16 ===
21 January 2022
19:45

(1 BP) Hartpury	31 – 31	London Scottish (1 BP)

ALPAS Arena
Attendance: 1,503
Referee: Hary Walbaum

22 January 2022
13:30

(1 BP) Ampthill	12 – 17	Jersey Reds

Dillingham Park
Attendance: 627
Referee: Charlie Gayther

22 January 2022
14:30

(1 BP) Cornish Pirates	52 – 17	Nottingham

Mennaye Field
Attendance: 1,848
Referee: Dan Jones

22 January 2022
15:00

(1 BP) Ealing Trailfinders	47 – 5	Coventry

Trailfinders Sports Ground
Attendance: 901
Referee: George Selwood

22 January 2022
15:00

Richmond	22 – 19	Bedford Blues (1 BP)

Athletic Ground
Attendance: 1,740
Referee: Sara Cox

Bye/s: Doncaster Knights

=== Round 17 ===
29 January 2022
14:00

(1 BP) Jersey Reds	29 – 13	Richmond

Stade Santander International
Attendance: 1,272
Referee: Hamish Smales

29 January 2022
14:30

Doncaster Knights	19 – 13	Ampthill (1 BP)

Castle Park
Attendance: 1,131
Referee: Andrew Jackson

29 January 2022
15:00

Bedford Blues	10 – 34	Hartpury (1 BP)

Goldington Road
Attendance: 2,073
Referee: Alex Thomas

29 January 2022
15:00

Coventry	21 – 31	Cornish Pirates (1 BP)

Butts Park Arena
Attendance: 2,534
Referee: Mike Hudson

29 January 2022
15:00

London Scottish	P – P	Ealing Trailfinders

Athletic Ground

Bye/s: Nottingham

=== Rounds 10, 12 & 14 (rescheduled matches) ===
4 February 2022
19:45

(1 BP) Nottingham	31 – 41	Jersey Reds (1 BP)

Lady Bay Sports Ground
Attendance: 838
Referee: Anthony Woodthorpe

5 February 2022
14:00

Richmond	24 – 24	Cornish Pirates (1 BP)

Athletic Ground
Attendance: 630
Referee: Dan Jones

5 February 2022
14:30

Doncaster Knights	24 – 0	Bedford Blues

Castle Park
Attendance: 1,112
Referee: Nick Wood

5 February 2022
14:30

Hartpury	14 – 33	Ealing Trailfinders (1 BP)

ALPAS Arena
Attendance: 811
Referee: Michale Hudson

=== Round 18 ===
11 February 2022
19:45

(1 BP) Nottingham	27 – 15	Coventry

Lady Bay Sports Ground
Attendance: 919
Referee: Hamish Smales

12 February 2022
13:30

(1 BP) Hartpury	31 – 40	Jersey Reds (1 BP)

ALPAS Arena
Attendance: 966
Referee: Dan Jones

12 February 2022
14:30

Cornish Pirates	19 – 0	London Scottish

Mennaye Field
Attendance: 1,440
Referee: Alex Thomas

12 February 2022
15:00

Ealing Trailfinders	19 – 31	Bedford Blues (1 BP)

Trailfinders Sports Ground
Attendance: 1,250
Referee: George Selwood

12 February 2022
15:00

(2 BP) Richmond	30 – 33	Doncaster Knights (1 BP)

Athletic Ground
Attendance: 700
Referee: Charles Gayther

Bye/s: Ampthill

=== Round 19 ===
19 February 2022
14:00

Ampthill	13 – 8	Richmond (1 BP)

Dillingham Park
Attendance: 321
Referee: Nick Wood

19 February 2022
14:30

Doncaster Knights	11 – 10	Hartpury (1 BP)

Castle Park
Attendance: 1,214
Referee: Joe James

19 February 2022
15:00

Bedford Blues	12 – 20	Cornish Pirates

Goldington Road
Attendance: 2,571
Referee: Andrew Jackson

19 February 2022
15:00

Jersey Reds	10 – 22	Ealing Trailfinders

Stade Santander International
Attendance: 1,464
Referee: Adam Leal

19 February 2022
15:00

London Scottish	24 – 36	Nottingham (1 BP)

Athletic Ground
Attendance: 480
Referee: Michael Hudson

Bye/s: Coventry

=== Round 20 ===
26 February 2022
14:30

(1 BP) Hartpury	20 – 21	Ampthill

ALPAS Arena
Attendance: 1,073
Referee: Nicholas Wood

26 February 2022
15:00

(1 BP) Coventry	62 – 12	London Scottish

Butts Park Arena
Attendance: 1,977
Referee: Dan Jones

26 February 2022
15:00

Ealing Trailfinders	17 – 25	Doncaster Knights

Trailfinders Sports Ground
Attendance: 983
Referee: Hamish Smales

27 February 2022
14:00

Cornish Pirates	21 – 17	Jersey Reds (1 BP)

Mennaye Field
Attendance: 2,042
Referee: Anthony Woodthorpe

27 February 2022
15:00

Nottingham	22 – 47	Bedford Blues (1 BP)

Lady Bay Sports Ground
Attendance: 1,288
Referee: Harry Walbaum

Bye/s: Richmond

=== Rounds 13 & 17 (rescheduled matches) ===
4 March 2022
19:45

(1 BP) Nottingham	12 – 19	Richmond

Lady Bay Sports Ground
Attendance: 1,270
Referee: Joe James

5 March 2022
15:00

London Scottish	0 – 81	Ealing Trailfinders (1 BP)

Athletic Ground
Attendance: 584
Referee: Charles Gayther

=== Round 21 ===
11 March 2022
19:45

(1 BP) Bedford Blues	15 – 17	Coventry

Goldington Road
Attendance: 2,818
Referee: Sara Cox

12 March 2022
14:00

Ampthill	5 – 38	Ealing Trailfinders (1 BP)

Dillingham Park
Attendance: 795
Referee: Neil Chivers

12 March 2022
14:00

Richmond	20 – 12	Hartpury

Athletic Ground
Attendance: 669
Referee: Jack Makepeace

12 March 2022
14:30

(1 BP) Doncaster Knights	22 – 15	Cornish Pirates (1 BP)

Castle Park
Attendance: 1,285
Referee: Mike Hudson

12 March 2022
14:45

(1 BP) Jersey Reds	48 – 12	Nottingham

Stade Santander International
Attendance: 1,432
Referee: Alex Thomas

Bye/s: London Scottish

=== Rescheduled matches ===
19 March 2022
14:30

(1 BP) Cornish Pirates	31 – 24	Hartpury (2 BP)

Mennaye Field
Attendance: 1,843

19 March 2022
14:30

London Scottish	21 – 62	Bedford Blues (1 BP)

Athletic Ground
Attendance: 521

19 March 2022
16:00

(1 BP) Coventry	38 – 66	Jersey Reds(1 BP)

Butts Park Arena
Attendance: 2,341

=== Rescheduled matches ===
26 March 2022
15:00

(1 BP) Ealing Trailfinders	44 – 24	Cornish Pirates (1 BP)

Trailfinders Sports Ground
Attendance: 1,741
Referee: Mike Hudson

26 March 2022
15:00

(1 BP) Richmond	28 – 40	Coventry (1 BP)

Athletic Ground
Attendance: 1,225
Referee: Joe James

=== Rescheduled matches ===
1 April 2022
19:450

Nottingham	5 – 26	Doncaster Knights (1 BP)

Lady Bay Sports Ground
Attendance: 1,250
Referee: Nick Wood

2 April 2022
14:00

(1 BP) Cornish Pirates	28 – 28	Ampthill (1 BP)

Mennaye Field
Attendance: 1,678
Referee: Harry Walbaum

2 April 2022
15:00

(1 BP) Ealing Trailfinders	60 – 10	Richmond

Trailfinders Sports Ground
Attendance: 800
Referee: Sara Cox

== Attendances ==
Club	Home Games	Total	Average	Highest	Lowest	% Capacity
Ampthill	10	7,63	764	1,924	321	25%
Bedford Blues	10	25,931	2,593	4,153	1,083	52%
Cornish Pirates	10	16,963	1,696	2,042	1,263	42%
Coventry	10	20,979	2,098	2,534	1,453	52%
Doncaster Knights	10	9,836	984	1,285	703	19%
Ealing Trailfinders	10	10,056	1,006	1,741	800	25%
Hartpury	10	9,902	990	1,503	381	50%
Jersey Reds	10	12,676	1,268	1,803	941	32%
London Scottish	10	7,166	717	1,532	475	16%
Nottingham	10	10,774	1,077	1,288	838	31%
Richmond	10	9,685	969	1,740	530	22%

== Leading scorers ==
Note: Flags to the left of player names indicate national team as has been defined under World Rugby eligibility rules, or primary nationality for players who have not yet earned international senior caps. Players may hold one or more non-WR nationalities.

=== Most points ===
As of 3 April 2022

Rank	Player	Club	Points
1	(England) James Williams	Hartpury	150
2	(England) Craig Willis	Ealing Trailfinders	143
3	(England) Sam Olver	Doncaster Knights	130
4	(Wales) Arwel Robson	Cornish Pirates	123
5	(England) William Maisey	Bedford Blues	117
6	(England) James Kane	Richmond	116
7	(England) Russell Bennett	Ampthill	108
8	(Wales) Steven Shingler	Ealing Trailfinders	94
9	(New Zealand) Tony Fenner	Coventry	92

=== Most tries ===
As of 3 April 2022

Rank	Player	Club	Tries
1	(New Zealand) Mark Bright	Richmond	17
1	(Ireland) Eoghan Clarke	Jersey Reds	17
2	(England) Dean Adamson	Bedford Blues	16
3	(England) Thomas Channon	Cornish Pirates	15
3	(England) Simon Uzokwe	Ealing Trailfinders	15
3	(England) David Williams	Nottingham	15
4	(South Africa) Rayn Smid	Ealing Trailfinders	14
5	(South Africa) Jan-Henning Campher	Ealing Trailfinders	10
6	(England) Thomas Duncan	Cornish Pirates	9
