= Cornish Pirates =

English rugby union club, based in Penzance

(England) Cornish Pirates
- Full name: Penzance and Newlyn Rugby Football Club
- Union: Cornwall RFU
- Founded: 1945; 81 years ago
- Location: Penzance, Cornwall, England
- Ground: Mennaye Field (Capacity: 4,000 (2,200 seated))
- Chairman: Paul Durkin
- Coach(es): Gavin Cattle; Alan Paver
- Captain: John Stevens
- League: Champ Rugby
- 2025–26: 7th of 14
1st kit	2nd kit

Official website
- cornish-pirates.com

The Cornish Pirates (Cornish: An Vorladron Gernewek) are a professional rugby union team who play in the Champ Rugby, the second level of the English rugby union pyramid, and are the premier Cornish rugby club. The Cornish Pirates team are the 'First XV' of the Penzance & Newlyn Rugby Football Club, and play and train at their home ground, the Mennaye Field in Penzance.

== History ==
At the end of the 2004–05 season the Pirates finished in 4th position in National Division 1 which at the time was their highest league position since owner Dicky Evans became president and just three places below Premiership rugby status.

In 2005 the Pirates moved away from their home at The Mennaye in Penzance to a temporary 6,000-capacity Kenwyn Rugby Ground, near Truro. In examining the options it had been viewed as imperative to increase the support base which led to a difficult decision for Dicky Evans and the supporters of the Pirates, as to whether the team should relocate to another site to play their home matches or not. The questions, concerns and sentiments arising from the proposals were thoroughly debated in the clubhouse and elsewhere. However, on 27 May 2005 at an emergency meeting held in a packed St Johns Hall the innovative plans were passed. They included:

- Relocating to a new temporary site at Kenwyn, Truro for the 2005–06 season.
- Re-branding including changing the club's name to the Cornish Pirates.
- Upgrading all the facilities at the Mennaye Field which will continue to act as the permanent training base for the Cornish Pirates.
- The Mennaye to continue to act as the playing home for the Pirates mini and junior sections and Mounts Bay RFC.

Following the vote, Dicky Evans told members: "ten years ago I asked you to support me in taking this club into the professional era. At that time there were those were totally against this move, there are people that are against this latest move. However, it is my belief that we must try this venture". He expressed his personal happiness at the support expressed for the move and regarded it as a step towards a Premiership rugby club in Cornwall.

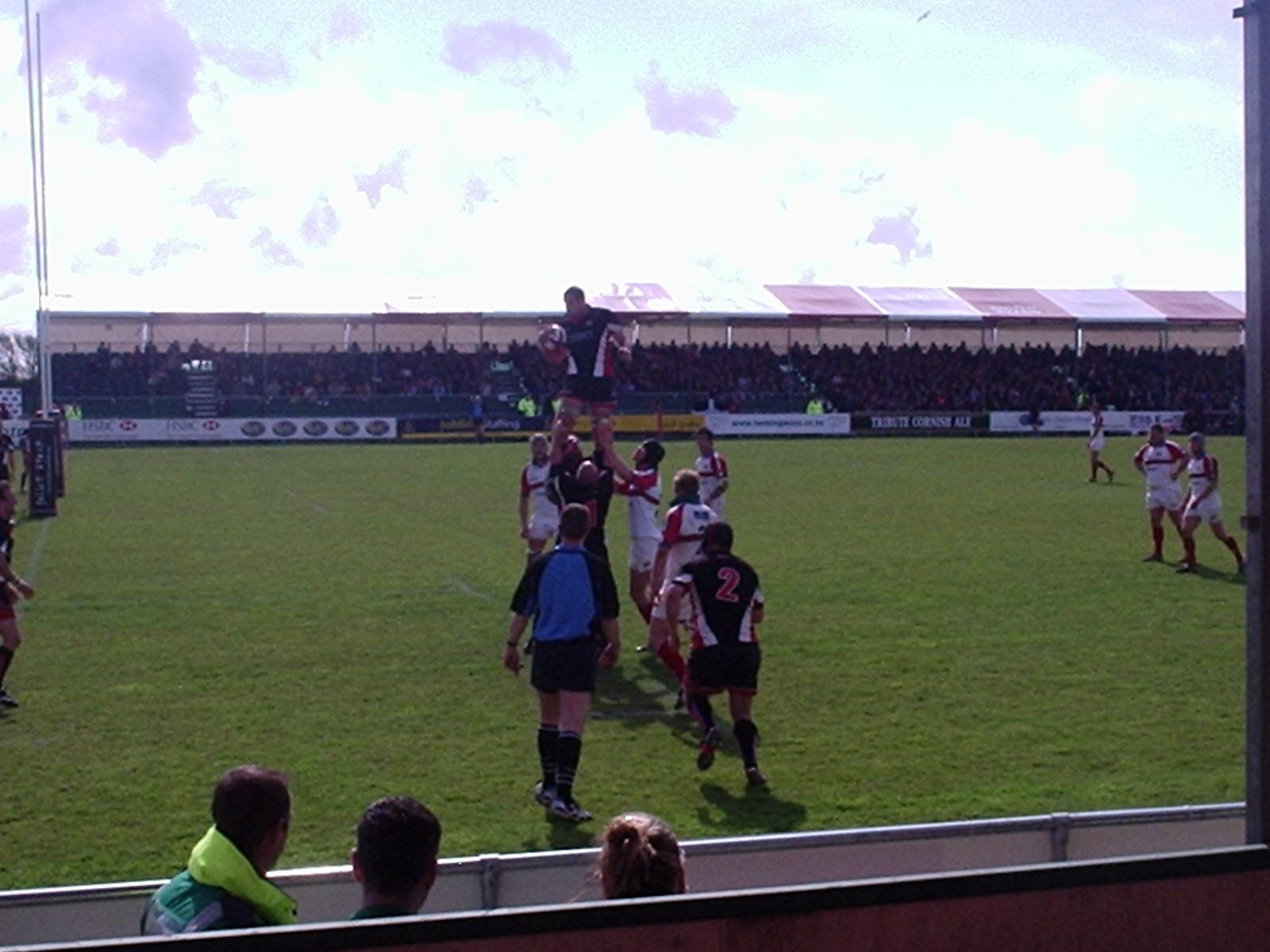
Joe Beardshaw wins line-out ball for the Pirates against Plymouth Albion in 2007

Following a highly successful 2005–06 season, (when crowds were increased and the Pirates finished 3rd in Division 1), it was decided to relocate again and over the next two seasons the Cornish Pirates played their home rugby matches at Camborne RFC's recreation ground. Camborne's ground is seen as many to be the best rugby ground in Cornwall boasting a superb grandstand. On 15 April 2007, the Cornish Pirates won the EDF Energy National Trophy at Twickenham for the first time in the club's history, against Exeter Chiefs. The score was 19–16.

The Pirates returned to The Mennaye for the 2010–11 season and remain there to date.

After the success of the 2006–07 cup win, the hope was that the club's ambition could finally be realised. This hope was hampered by the loss of Viliami Ma'asi and Alberto Di Bernardo (to Leeds), these losses were offset in some degree by the signing of Canadian international scrum half Ed Fairhurst, former England U21 centre Simon Whatling from Worcester and seasoned professional Rob Elloway from Gloucester. At first the results were not good but after the World Cup the team began to pick up and were joined by one of the stars of the tournament Tongan full back; Vunga Lilo. Unfortunately the side couldn't live with the newly relegated Northampton Saints and were unlucky to draw them in the 1st round of the cup, going down 15–3 at home.

In 2009–10 the Pirates won the inaugural British and Irish Cup, beating Munster A 23–14 in the final at the Recreation Ground, Camborne.

Pirates remain a solid RFU Championship side, their lowest finish since being 9th in 2015–16, with highs of 3rd in 2010–11 and 2011–12. These 3rd-place finishes resulted in Pirates qualifying for the promotion play-offs. In 2010-11 Pirates beat London Welsh in the semi-final 18–10 at the Mennaye Field before succumbing to Worcester Warriors in the final over two legs, 12–21 at home and 25–20 away, 46–32 on aggregate, resulting in Worcester's promotion back to the Aviva Premiership. The following season the Pirates again won their semi-final, beating Bristol over two legs, 45–24 at home and losing 29–18 away, resulting in a 63–53 win on aggregate. Pirates again however lost in the final, this time to London Welsh, losing 21–37 at the Mennaye and 29–20 away from home, 66–41 on aggregate.

Following these highs, Pirates did not finish in the play-off places again, finishing between 6th and 9th in the subsequent seasons. They returned to the top four in the 2017–18 season, finishing 4th, however a restructure to the league for that season had seen the play-offs abolished, with 1st place being promoted to the Premiership automatically.

To be promoted to the Premiership a team must meet certain stadium requirements, and the capacity of the Mennaye Field is too small to meet these. Because of this, there have been many plans over the years for the Pirates to move into a new, larger stadium which meets these requirements to allow the Pirates to achieve their goal of promotion to the Premiership. The most concrete of these plans is the proposed Stadium for Cornwall, which would be home for both the Pirates and Truro City Football Club. The Stadium For Cornwall has received funding from Cornwall Council, and is now only awaiting £3m of funding from the UK government before construction can begin, which is expected to be provided in Spring 2019. The first stage is planned to have a capacity of 6,000, which can be expanded to 10,000 in phase two in the event of the Pirates being promoted. After years of uncertainty, Cornwall County Council withdrew their planned funding contribution in 2022 and the stadium development was abandoned.

In May 2026, Richard Wastnage and US investors J. Kenneth Moritz and John H. Tippins joined Cornish Pirates investment structure. They have become the first known English rugby union club to onboard major American investors.

== Supporters ==
A number of promotions at the beginning of the 21st century saw the Pirates rise from south-west regional rugby all of the way up to the second division. The re-brand from Penzance & Newlyn to the Cornish Pirates for the 2005–06 season, along with relocating from Penzance to Truro, meant that the club was not only the highest ranked in the county but also the best supported, having doubled its supporter base in just over five seasons. A further move to Camborne the next season saw attendances continued to flourish, rising to a peak of 3,011 per game during the 2009–10 season.

A move back to Penzance during the 2010–11 season heralded a steady decline in attendances, although as the county's only professional team the club still was easily the best supported. Despite their higher status, the Pirates continued to enjoy good relations with neighbouring clubs such as Redruth and Camborne, often playing home matches on Sunday so that supporters of those clubs can also attend games at the Mennaye Field. It is hoped that the proposed move back to Truro to the proposed Stadium for Cornwall will see an upturn in the club's fortunes and bring the supporters back.

Season	Total	Average	Highest
2000–01 (Note: Pirates are missing 3 home attendances out of 13 due to poor media coverage during the 2000–01 season.)	11,400	1,140	2,000
2001–02 (Note: Pirates are missing 1 home attendance out of 13 during the 2001–02 season.)	12,400	1,127	3,000
2002–03 (Note: Pirates are missing 6 home attendances out of 13 due to extremely poor media coverage during the 2002–03 season.)	11,300	1,614	2,200
2003–04 (Note: Pirates are missing 3 home attendances out of 13 due to poor media coverage during the 2003–04 season.)	19,810	2,201	5,100
2004–05 (Note: Pirates are missing 1 home attendance out of 13 during the 2004–05 season.)	24,018	2,002	5,000
2005–06	36,194	2,784	5,879
2006–07	38,892	2,593	5,365
2007–08	52,294	3,486	6,487
2008–09	44,739	2,983	4,913
2009–10	42,157	3,011	5,654
2010–11	39,195	2,450	3,500
2011–12	36,932	2,308	3,214
2012–13	20,480	1,862	2,954
2013–14	21,558	1,797	3,752
2014–15	16,270	1,479	2,390
2015–16	15,705	1,428	2,340
2016–17	16,132	1,467	2,043
2017–18	16,715	1,520	2,236
2018–19	20,190	1,835	2,963
2019–20 (Note: Pirates only played 8 home games (out of 11) during the 2019–20 season due to the COVID-19 pandemic in the United Kingdom.)	14,372	1,797	2,975
2020–21 (Note: Home games were held behind closed doors during the 2020–21 season due to the COVID-19 pandemic in the United Kingdom.)	0	0	0
2021–22	16,963	1,696	2,042
2022–23	16,599	1,509	1,718
2023–24	16,242	1,624	2,474
2024–25	16,843	1,531	1,866
2025–26			

== Season summary ==
Season	League				National Cup(s)		Other Cup(s)	
Season	Competition/Level	Position	Points	Play Offs	Competition	Performance	Competition	Performance
1987–88	Cornwall/Devon (8)	4th	13					
1988–89	Cornwall/Devon (8)	7th	10					
1989–90	Cornwall/Devon (8)	1st (promoted)						
1990–91	Western Counties (7)							
1991–92	Western Counties (7)							
1992–93	Western Counties (7)							
1993–94	Western Counties (7)							
1994–95	Western Counties (7)							
1995–96	Western Counties (7)	3rd (promoted)	14					
1996–97	South West 2 West (6)							
1997–98	South West 2 West (6)	1st (promoted)	36					
1998–99	South West 1 (5)	4th	29		Tetley's Bitter Cup	2nd Round	Cornwall Cup	Winners
1999–00	South West 1 (5)	1st (promoted)	40		Tetley's Bitter Cup	3rd Round	Cornwall Cup	Winners
2000–01	National 3 South (4)	3rd	38		Tetley's Bitter Cup	3rd Round	Cornwall Cup	Semi-finals
2001–02	National 3 South (4)	1st (promoted)	49		Powergen Cup	2nd Round		
2002–03	National 2 (3)	1st (promoted)	45		Powergen Cup	3rd Round		
2003–04	National 1 (2)	10th	43 (Note: Bonus points had been used in National 1 since the 2003–04 season but would not be introduced to the lower leagues until much later. As this was the highest level the Pirates had reached, 2003–04 was the first season the club would experience bonus points.)		Powergen Cup	6th Round		
2004–05	National 1 (2)	4th	85		Powergen Cup	3rd Round		
2005–06 (Note: First season that the club would be known as the Cornish Pirates. Prior to this they were Penzance-Newlyn.)	National 1 (2)	3rd	90		Powergen Trophy	6th Round		
2006–07	National 1 (2)	5th	101		EDF Energy Cup	Winners		
2007–08	National 1 (2)	5th	91		EDF Energy Trophy	4th Round		
2008–09	National 1 (2)	7th	82		EDF Energy Trophy	5th Round		
2009–10	RFU Championship (2) (Note: As part of the extensive league restructuring by the RFU for the 2009–10 season, National 1 was renamed as the RFU Championship.)	6th (Note: League position is taken from 1st stage only. The 2009–10 RFU Championship was divided into three stages; the Pirates finished 6th during the 1st stage (main league), and then 3rd in their promotion group during the second stage, failing to qualify for the playoff semi-finals.)	58 (Note: Figure is taken from first stage of the 2009–10 RFU Championship.)				British & Irish Cup	Winners
2010–11	RFU Championship (2)	3rd (Note: As with the previous season, the 2010–11 RFU Championship was divided into three stages. Pirates finished 3rd in the first stage, then 1st in their promotion group (second stage) to qualify for the playoffs.)	76 (Note: Figure is taken from first stage of the 2010–11 RFU Championship.)	Runners up			British & Irish Cup	Pool Stage
2011–12	RFU Championship (2)	3rd (Note: Pirates finished 3rd in the first stage, then 2nd in their promotion group (second stage) to qualify for the playoffs.)	74 (Note: Figure is taken from first stage of the 2011–12 RFU Championship.)	Runners up			British & Irish Cup	Semi-finals
2012–13	RFU Championship (2)	6th (Note: The competition format for the 2012–13 RFU Championship changed to a main league stage, with the top 4 sides contesting the playoffs.)	52				British & Irish Cup	Quarter-finals
2013–14	RFU Championship (2)	6th	51				British & Irish Cup	Quarter-finals
2014–15	RFU Championship (2)	8th	45				British & Irish Cup	Pool Stage
2015–16	RFU Championship (2)	9th	49				British & Irish Cup	Semi-finals
2016–17	RFU Championship (2)	6th	55				British & Irish Cup	Quarter-finals
2017–18	RFU Championship (2)	4th (Note: The competition format for the 2017–18 RFU Championship and onward was changed to a standard league, with the playoffs discontinued.)	67				British & Irish Cup	Quarter-finals
2018–19	RFU Championship (2)	5th	59		RFU Championship Cup	Semi-finals		
2019–20	RFU Championship (2)	3rd	75.43 (Note: The season was postponed and ultimately cancelled due to the COVID-19 pandemic in the United Kingdom with Pirates sitting in 3rd, having played 15 games and gained 52 points. The remaining games were calculated on a 'best playing record formula', with Pirates remaining in 3rd place but with 75.43 points.)		RFU Championship Cup	Semi-finals (Note: Pirates had reached the semi-finals of RFU Championship Cup by the time the COVID-19 pandemic in the United Kingdom broke out. The cup would be cancelled by the RFU with no winner.)		
2020–21	RFU Championship (2)	4th	32 (Note: Due to the ongoing COVID-19 pandemic in the United Kingdom clubs only played 10 league games this season.)					
2021–22	RFU Championship (2)	3rd	73		RFU Championship Cup	Semi-finals		
2022–23	RFU Championship (2)	5th	61		RFU Championship Cup	Semi-finals		
2023–24	RFU Championship (2)	2nd	75		Premiership Rugby Cup	Group stage		
2024–25	RFU Championship (2)	4th	72		Premiership Rugby Cup	Group stage		
2025–26	Champ Rugby (2)							
Green background stands for either league champions (with promotion) or cup winners. Blue background stands for promotion without winning league or losing cup finalists. Pink background stands for relegation.

== Honours ==
- Cornwall Cup winners (3): 1975–76, 1998–99, 1999–00 (Note: Penzance (a parent club of the Pirates) won 2 additional Cornish Cups and Newlyn (the second parent club) won the Cornwall Clubs Cup once.)
- Cornwall & Devon champions: 1989–90
- South West Division 2 champions: 1996–97
- South West Division 1 champions: 1998–99
- National League 3 South champions: 2001–02
- National League 2 champions: 2002–03
- EDF Energy National Trophy winners: 2006–07
- British and Irish Cup winners: 2009–10
- RFU Championship runners up: 2010–11, 2011–12

== Club records ==
Highest attendance – 6,487

At home to Northampton Saints on 9 September 2007 (Recreation Ground, Camborne).

Highest average attendance (league) — 3,486

Achieved during the 2007–08 season

== Current standings ==
2026–27 Champ Rugby table
Pos	Team	Pld	W	D	L	PF	PA	PD	TF	TA	TB	LB	Pts	Qualification
1	Worcester Warriors	6	6	0	0	277	114	+163	42	17	4	0	28	Play-off semi-finals
2	Ealing Trailfinders	6	5	0	1	287	135	+152	45	20	5	1	26	Play-off semi-finals
3	Coventry	6	5	0	1	278	188	+90	41	29	2	1	23	Play-off quarter-finals
4	Cornish Pirates	6	4	0	2	222	208	+14	33	31	3	0	19	Play-off quarter-finals
5	Chinnor	6	4	0	2	201	200	+1	31	31	1	0	17	Play-off quarter-finals
6	Rotherham Titans	6	4	0	2	181	231	−50	28	35	1	0	17	Play-off quarter-finals
7	Ampthill	6	4	0	2	210	228	−18	32	34	0	0	16	
8	Bedford Blues	6	3	0	3	188	179	+9	29	27	3	1	16	
9	Doncaster Knights	6	2	0	4	187	197	−10	28	28	1	2	11	
10	Caldy	6	1	0	5	203	239	−36	31	36	0	3	7	
11	Blackheath	6	1	0	5	165	220	−55	23	32	0	3	7	
12	Nottingham	6	1	0	5	145	227	−82	22	35	0	2	6	Relegation play-off
13	Richmond	6	1	0	5	158	221	−63	24	35	0	1	5	Relegation play-off
14	Hartpury	6	1	0	5	137	252	−115	24	35	0	1	5	Relegated

Updated to match(es) played on 1 November 2026. Source:
Rules for classification: If teams are level at any stage, tiebreakers are applied in the following order:
1. Number of matches won
2. Number of matches drawn
3. Difference between points for and against
4. Total number of points for
5. Aggregate number of points scored in matches between tied teams
6. Number of matches won excluding the first match, then the second and so on until the tie is settled

== Current squad ==
The Cornish Pirates squad for the 2025–26 season is:

Cornish Pirates 2025–26 Champ Rugby squad
**Props**: (England) Ollie Andrews; (Ireland) James French; (England) Alfie Petch; (England) Ben Woodmansey; (England) Billy Young; **Hookers**: (England) Sol Moody (Note: Exeter Chiefs players who are dual-registered with the club for the 2025-26 season.); (Wales) Morgan Nelson; (England) Matt Pritchard; **Locks**: (England) Alfie Bell (Note: Exeter Chiefs players who are dual-registered with the club for the 2025-26 season.); (England) Matt Cannon; (England) Milo Hallam; (Scotland) Josh King; (Australia) Luke Ratcliff	**Back row**: (United States) Tomiwa Agbongbon; (England) Barnaby Elderkin; (England) Alex Everett; (England) Jack Forsythe; (England) Charlie Rice; (England) John Stevens; (Australia) Rory Suttor; **Scrum-halves**: (Wales) Dan Hiscocks; (Wales) Orson James (Note: Exeter Chiefs players who are dual-registered with the club for the 2025-26 season.); (England) Will Rigelsford; **Fly-halves**: (England) Joe Elderkin; (Australia) Angus Mawson; (Wales) Arwel Robson	**Centres**: (England) Chester Ribbons; (England) Zack Wimbush (Note: Exeter Chiefs players who are dual-registered with the club for the 2025-26 season.); (England) Harry Yates; **Wings**: (Wales) Ben Cambriani; (England) Arthur Relton; (England) Matty Ward; **Fullbacks**: (Wales) Iwan Price-Thomas; (England) Louie Sinclair
**(c)** denotes the team captain. (vc) denotes vice-captain. **Bold** denotes internationally capped players.^{ST} denotes a short-term signing. Source:

== Notable former players ==
- (England) Joe Bearman
- (England) Stack Stevens
- (England) Rob Thirlby
- (Wales) Will James
- (Scotland) Blair Cowan
- (England) Dave Ward
- (England) Bertie Hopkin
- (Kenya) Oscar Osir
- (Kenya) Dicky Evans
- Jethro Jethro (comedian)

== See also ==
- Cornwall RFU
- Newlyn RFC
- Penzance RFC
