= Kenwyn Rugby Ground =

Rugby ground in Truro, Cornwall, England

Kenwyn
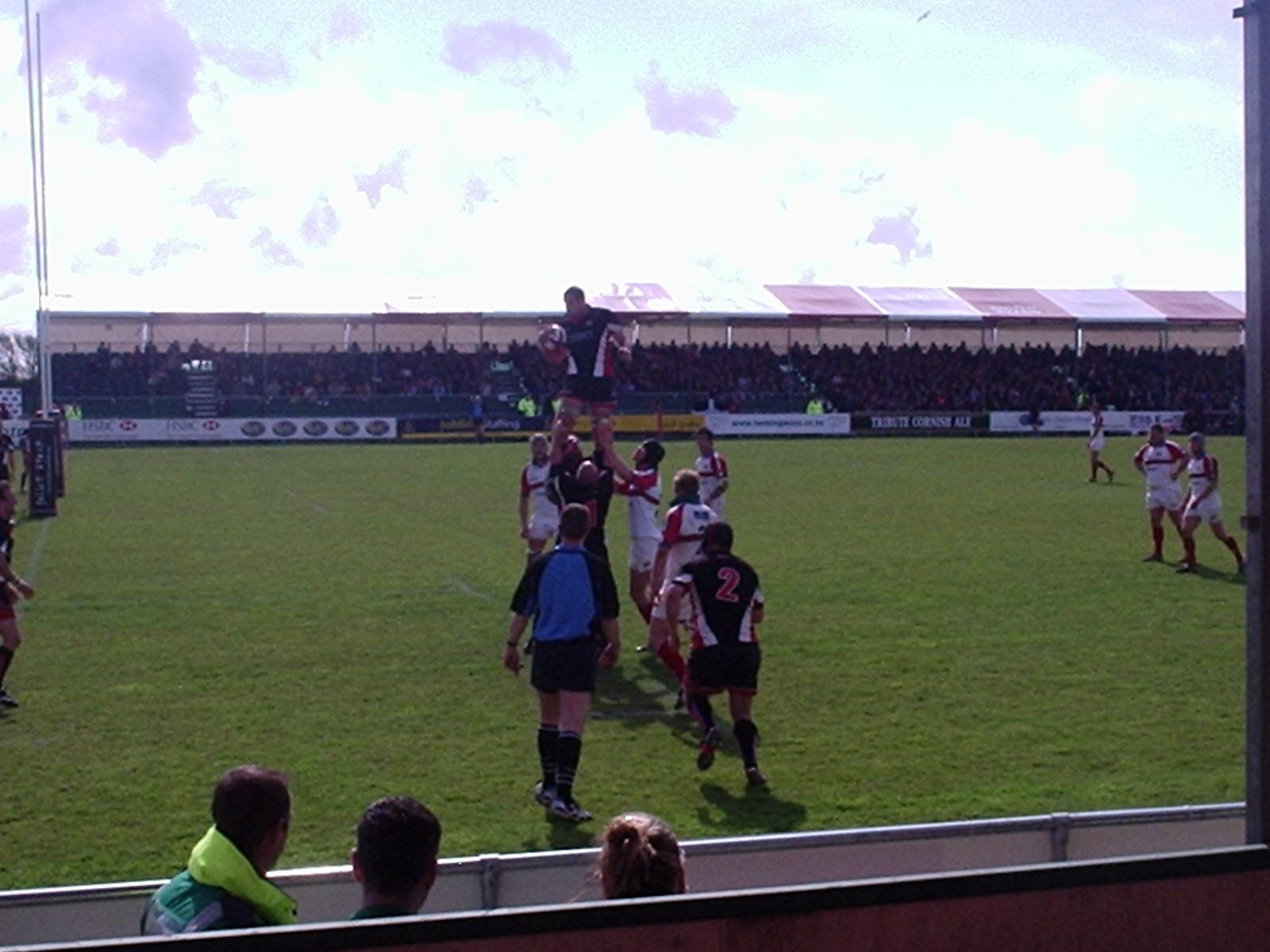
- Cornish Pirates vs Plymouth Albion at Kenwyn, April 2006
- Location: Truro, Cornwall
- Operator: Cornish Pirates
- Capacity: 5800
- Surface: Grass

Construction
- Built: 2005
- Opened: Sunday 18 September 2005
- Closed: April 2006

Tenant
- Cornish Pirates

The Kenwyn Ground was a temporary rugby ground, in Cornwall, UK, built in an attempt to increase the fan base of the newly named Cornish Pirates. The move was controversial and caused resentment from some members and followers of Penzance and Newlyn RFC, as a "proud local name" was lost to the rugby world. The Pirates stayed for just one season (2005–06), playing twelve matches, moving to the Camborne Recreation Ground for the 2006–07 season. The move to Kenwyn was considered to be justified as the average attendance increased by 40% on the previous season.

== History ==
The Kenwyn Ground was previously used by Truro Rugby Club in the early part of the 20th century and was the playing field for Truro Cathedral School for many years.

=== First Match ===
- Sunday 18 September 2005. Cornish Pirates v Earth Titans 43 – 13 (att 2400)

=== Last Match ===
- Sunday 16 April 2006. Cornish Pirates v Plymouth Albion 29 – 28 (att 3850)

=== Matches at Kenwyn Rugby Ground 2005–06 ===
	Date	Opponent	Result	Score	Attendance
1	18 Sep	Earth Titans	won	43 – 13	2400
2	9 Oct	Nottingham	won	29 – 21	2800
3	30 Oct	Sedgley Park	won	53 – 8	2443
4	13 Nov	Otley	won	41 – 22	2600
5	4 Dec	Coventry	won	15 – 10	2200
6	2 Jan	Doncaster Knights	won	43 – 26	2969
7	15 Jan	Newbury	won	30 – 10	2689
8	29 Jan	Exeter Chiefs	lost	16 – 23	2901
9	12 Feb	Bedford	won	26 – 21	2657
10	5 Mar	Pertemp Bees	won	21 – 13	1814
11	26 Mar	NEC Harlequins	lost	8 – 29	5800
12	16 Apr	Plymouth Albion	won	29 – 28	3850

- For completeness details of the final home league match of the season, played at the Mennaye Field, is also shown.

13	29 Apr	London Welsh	won	36 – 13	1724

== See also ==
- Mennaye Field
