= Nic Sestaret =

French rugby union player

- Born: Nicolas Sestaret; 26 July 1982 (age 44) Sarlat, France
- Height: 1.78 m (5 ft 10 in)
- Weight: 92 kg (14.5 st)

Rugby union career
- Position: Winger
Senior career
Years	Team	Apps	(Points)
2001-2002	Stade Toulousain		
2002-2003	Section Paloise		
2003-2005	US Dax		
2005-2008	Plymouth Albion		
2008-2014	Exeter Chiefs		
International career
Years	Team	Apps	(Points)
- France U21
–	Barbarians		

Nicolas Sestaret (born 26 July 1982) is a former professional Rugby Union player. Sestaret played both at centre and on the wing. He finished his playing career for Exeter Chiefs in the Aviva Premiership.

In 2014 he was appointed Head of Rugby at Taunton School. In 2023 he was appoint Director of Sport at Westonbirt School.

== 2013 - 14 season ==
While playing for the Exeter Chiefs, Sestaret made a career highlight with the Exeter Chiefs winning the Aviva Premiership. "Obviously it is very hard to get into the Heineken Cup in the Premiership because it is so competitive so to have that from the LV= Cup is a bonus for sure," said Sestaret of the competition. Before being appointed Head of Rugby at Taunton School, he coached for Sidmouth 1st XV and worked for HSBC Premier in Exeter.

== Personal life ==
Nicolas has a degree in Marketing and Management, is a Level 2 coach and is qualified in Strength and Conditioning, specialising in speed development. Married to Deborah Sestaret.
