= Ben Russell (rugby union, born 1984) =

English rugby union player

Benjamin John Russell (born 9 July 1984 at Guildford, England) was an English rugby union player for Coventry R.F.C., Northampton Saints and London Saracens.

== Early life ==
Russell started playing mini rugby at age five after his father Nigel took him down to the local club, Oundle. In 1999, at the age of 15, he played for the Northampton Saints Academy, then-coached by Brett Taylor. In 2000, 16-year-old Russell first represented England at Under-18 level; a year later he again represented England, this time at Under-19 level, captaining them in 2002. That same year, he made his first full England debut playing in the Rugby World Cup Sevens tournament in South Africa. Russell had a major role in the team's victory.

== Professional career ==
Russell signed his first professional contract with the Saints in 2001 at the age of 17, making him the youngest player in the Zurich Premiership at the time.

Russell played for two further seasons for the Saints before signing for the Saracens in 2003. After two years at the Saracens, he moved to Coventry where, in 2006, he became captain.
