= 2022–23 RFU Championship Cup =

English professional rugby union competition

Tournament details
- Countries: England Jersey
- Tournament format(s): Round-robin and knockout
- Date: 4 November 2022 — 13 May 2023

Tournament statistics
- Teams: 12
- Matches played: 39
- Attendance: 41,442 (1,063 per match)
- Highest attendance: 3,045 – Bedford v Coventry, 11 November 2022
- Lowest attendance: 483 – Ampthill v Caldy, 4 February 2023
- Tries scored: 306 (7.85 per match)
- Top point scorer(s): 44 – Russell Bennett (Jersey)
- Top try scorer(s): 6 – Arthur Relton (Pirates); Peter Roberts (Doncaster); Simon Uzokwe (Ealing); David Williams (Nottingham)

Final
- Champions: Ealing Trailfinders (3rd title)
- Runners-up: Jersey Reds

The 2022–23 RFU Championship Cup was the fourth and final season of the annual rugby union Championship Cup competition for second tier, professional English clubs playing in the RFU Championship. The competition was won by Ealing Trailfinders who defeated Jersey Reds 35 - 31 in the final. It would be the third Championship Cup title for the London club. The competition would merge with the Premiership Rugby Cup for the following season.

== Competition format ==
The competition format is a pool stage followed by a knockout stage. The pool stage consists of three pools of four teams each playing home and away matches. Pool matches ran from September through to February, on weekends when there is no RFU Championship league fixtures. The three group winners, along with the best group runner up, qualify for the semi-finals to be held in May.

== Participating teams and locations ==
Team	Ground	Capacity	City/Area
Ampthill	Dillingham Park	3,000	Ampthill, Bedfordshire
Bedford Blues	Goldington Road	5,000 (1,700 seats)	Bedford, Bedfordshire
Caldy	Paton Field	4,000	Thurstaston, Wirral, Merseyside
Cornish Pirates	Mennaye Field	4,000 (2,200 seats)	Penzance, Cornwall
Coventry	Butts Park Arena	4,000 (3,000 seats)	Coventry, West Midlands
Doncaster Knights	Castle Park	5,000 (1,650 seats)	Doncaster, South Yorkshire
Ealing Trailfinders	Trailfinders Sports Ground	4,000 (2,200 seats)	West Ealing, London
Hartpury	Gillman's Ground	2,000	Hartpury, Gloucestershire
Jersey Reds	Stade Santander International	4,000	Saint Peter, Jersey
London Scottish	Athletic Ground	4,500 (1,000 seats)	Richmond, London, London
Nottingham	Lady Bay Sports Ground	3,500	Nottingham, Nottinghamshire
Richmond	Athletic Ground	4,500 (1,000 seats)	Richmond, London, London

Locations of the 2022–23 RFU Championship Cup teams

== Pool stage ==
=== Pool A ===
Pool A
Pos	Team	Pld	W	D	L	PF	PA	PD	TB	LB	Pts	Qualification
1	Ealing Trailfinders (Q)	6	5	0	1	248	112	+136	5	1	26	Qualified for the semi-finals as group winner
2	Jersey Reds (Q)	6	5	0	1	212	102	+110	5	0	25	Qualified for the semi-finals as the best runner up
3	Hartpury	6	1	0	5	114	247	−133	3	0	7	
4	Nottingham	6	1	0	5	98	211	−113	1	1	6	

Updated to match(es) played on 19 February 2023. Source: "Championship Cup 2022-23". englandrugby.com.
Rules for classification: If teams are level at any stage, tiebreakers are applied in the following order:
1. Number of matches won
2. Total number of tries scored
3. Total number of points for
4. Difference between points for and against
5. Fewest red cards
6. Coin toss
(Q) Qualified for the phase indicated

==== Round 1 ====
6 November 2022
14:00

Nottingham	12 – 38	Jersey Reds (1 BP)
Try: Dickinson 13' m Wright 71' c Con: Peachey 72'		Try: Barnes 3' c Hutler 8' m Bennett 15' m Clarke 32' c Penalty try 39'; Argyle 54' c Con: Bennett (3) 4', 33', 54'

Lady Bay Sports Ground
Attendance: 601
Referee: Hamish Grant

6 November 2022
15:00

(1 BP) Ealing Trailfinders	64 – 10	Hartpury
Try: Metcalf (2) 12' c, 57' m Grant (2) 14' c, 40' m Digby 25' m Uzokwe (3) 47' c, 53' c, 80' m Burns 70' c Kelleher 77' c Con: Lancaster (5) 13', 48', 54', 71', 78'		Try: Denty 61' m Tanner 67' m

Trailfinders Sports Ground
Attendance: 672
Referee: Alex Thomas

==== Round 2 ====
12 November 2022
14:00

(1 BP) Jersey Reds	55 – 24	Hartpury (1 BP)
Try: Owen (2) 6' c, 54' m Clarke 15' c Brown 34' m Scott 40' m Chapman 62' c Wollett 65' c Hutler 68' c Hadfield 80' m Con: Bennett (3) 6', 15', 62'; Owen (2) 65', 68'		Try: Denty 32' m Short (2) 42' m, 74' c Tarling 71' c Con: Matthews (2) 71', 74'

Stade Santander International
Attendance: 908
Referee: Dan Jones

13 November 2022
15:00

(1 BP) Nottingham	19 – 26	Ealing Trailfinders
Try: D Williams 12' m Bunting 18' c Olowofela 61' c Con: Bunting (2) 18', 62'		Try: Uzokwe 22' m Tizzano (2) 52' c, 59' c Campher 70' c Con: Willis (3) 53', 60', 71'

Lady Bay Sports Ground
Attendance: 515
Referee: Neil Chivers

==== Round 3 ====
18 November 2022
19:45

(1 BP) Hartpury	33 – 19	Nottingham
Try: Stratford (2) 12' c, 22' c Bruzulier 45' c Denty 59' c Perry 69' m Con: Matthews (4) 12', 22', 45', 59'		Try: D Williams 40' c Clayton 41' c Slatem 80' m Con: Bunting (2) 40', 42'

Gillman's Ground
Attendance: 625
Referee: Alex Thomas

19 November 2022
14:00

Ealing Trailfinders	22 – 13	Jersey Reds
Try: Penalty try 7'; Malton 45' m Howard 50' c Con: Willis 50'; Pen: Willis 17'		Try: Scott 9' c Con: Mitchell 10'; Pen: Bennett 33'

Trailfinders Sports Ground
Attendance: 903
Referee: Simon Harding

==== Round 4 ====
3 February 2023
19:45

(1 BP) Nottingham	24 – 12	Hartpury
Try: D Williams (3) 32' m, 37' m, 69' c Clayton 65' c Con: Hollingsworth (2) 66', 70'		Try: Stratford 27' c Denty 79' m Con: Matthews 28'

Lady Bay Sports Ground
Attendance: 908
Referee: Nicholas Wood

4 February 2023
14:00

(1 BP) Jersey Reds	28 – 27	Ealing Trailfinders (2 BP)
Try: Hadfield 22' c Dun 28' c Woollett 35' c Barnes 73' c Con: Bennett (4) 22', 28', 35', 73'		Try: Walker 39' c Hampson 45' c Earle 58' m Burns 80' m Con: Willis (2) 40', 45'; Pen: Willis 56'

Stade Santander International
Attendance: 1,166
Referee: Dan Jones

==== Round 5 ====
10 February 2023
19:45

Hartpury	7 – 47	Jersey Reds (1 BP)
Try: Lennon 55' c Con: Lennon 56'		Try: Dun 6' c Cook 12' c Owen 21' m Hutler 40' c Penalty try 51'; Lewis 57' c Everard 80' c Con: Pitmann (4) 7', 14', 40'+1, 58'; Bennett 80'+1

Gillman's Ground
Attendance: 700
Referee: Christophe Ridley

11 February 2023
15:00

(1 BP) Ealing Trailfinders	71 – 14	Nottingham
Try: Kelleher 3' c Walker (2) 8' m, 17' c Uzokwe (2) 25' c, 78' m Bird-Tulloch 30' c Burns 33' c Holmes 36' m Montgomery 40' c Whyte 45' c Bodilly 71' c Con: Shingler (4) 3', 18', 25', 30'; Lancaster (4) 33', 40', 45', 71'		Try: Olowofela 19' c Green 74' c Con: Hollingsworth 19'; Bunting 74'

Trailfinders Sports Ground
Attendance: 814
Referee: Charlie Gayther

==== Round 6 ====
17 February 2023
19:30

(1 BP) Jersey Reds	31 – 10	Nottingham
Try: Hadfield (2) 2' c, 41' m Barnes 40' c Brown 44' c Chapman 72' m Con: Pitmann (2) 2', 40'; Burnell 44'		Try: T Williams 53' m D Williams 62' m

Stade Santander International
Attendance: 1,204
Referee: Ian Bibey

17 February 2023
19:45

(1 BP) Hartpury	28 – 38	Ealing Trailfinders (1 BP)
Try: McNab (2) 4' c, 46' c Morris 20' c Stratford 51' c Con: Matthews (4) 4', 20', 46', 51'		Try: Bridge 9' c Walker 32' m Bodilly 36' c Davis 56' c Davidson 65' m Digby 73' c Con: Lancaster (2) 9', 36'; Willis (2) 56', 73'

Gillman's Ground
Attendance: 721
Referee: Mike Hudson

=== Pool B ===
Pool B
Pos	Team	Pld	W	D	L	PF	PA	PD	TB	LB	Pts	Qualification
1	Doncaster Knights (Q)	6	4	1	1	195	135	+60	5	0	23	Qualified for the semi-finals as group winner
2	Coventry	6	4	0	2	202	131	+71	4	1	21	
3	Bedford Blues	6	2	1	3	168	168	0	3	0	13	
4	London Scottish	6	1	0	5	113	244	−131	2	0	6	

Updated to match(es) played on 19 February 2023. Source: "Championship Cup 2022-23". englandrugby.com.
Rules for classification: If teams are level at any stage, tiebreakers are applied in the following order:
1. Number of matches won
2. Total number of tries scored
3. Total number of points for
4. Difference between points for and against
5. Fewest red cards
6. Coin toss
(Q) Qualified for the phase indicated

==== Round 1 ====
4 November 2022
19:45

(1 BP) London Scottish	26 – 17	Bedford Blues
Try: Trendholm 20' c Ferdinand 27' c Nutton' 39' c Riley 71' m Con: Sheppard (3) 20', 28', 40'		Try: Garside 59' c Tapley 79' c Con: French (2) 60', 80'

Athletic Ground
Attendance: 500
Referee: Simon Harding

5 November 2022
14:30

(1 BP) Doncaster Knights	22 – 7	Coventry
Try: Vukasinovic 48' m Daly (2) 57' m, 76' c Roberts 71' m Con: Parkin 76'		Try: Thomas 44' c Con: Mitchell 44'

Castle Park
Attendance: 889
Referee: Charlie Gayther

==== Round 2 ====
11 November 2022
19:45

Bedford Blues	27 – 21	Coventry (1 BP)
Try: Elliott 20' m Irvine 43' c Con: Maisey 44'; Pen: Maisey (5) 11', 51', 59', 64', 71'		Try: Ma'asi 36' c Pellegrini (2) 60' c, 67' c Con: Pellegrini (3) 37', 61', 68'

Goldington Road
Attendance: 3,045
Referee: Joe James

11 November 2022
19:45

London Scottish	12 – 24	Doncaster Knights (1 BP)
Try: Ferdinand 34' m Wallis 69' c Con: Slevin 70'		Try: Yarnell 3' c Parkin 21' c Roberts (2) 49' m, 55' m Con: Parkin (2) 4', 22'

Athletic Ground
Attendance: 617
Referee: Jonathan Cook

==== Round 3 ====
19 November 2022
14:30

(1 BP) Doncaster Knights	29 – 20	Bedford Blues
Try: Roberts (3) 13' c, 16' m, 40' m Holden 34' m Kelly 78' c Con: Dolly (2) 13', 78'		Try: Adamson 7' c Tapley 31' c Con: Maisey (2) 7', 32'; Pen: Maisey (2) 3', 65'

Castle Park
Attendance: 726
Referee: Hamish Grant

19 November 2022
15:00

(1 BP) Coventry	52 – 15	London Scottish
Try: Talbot-Davies 9' c Titherington 24' c Martin 41' c Brown 43' c Ma'asi 46' m Pellegrini 55' c Biggs 66' c Seward 80' m Con: Pellegrini (5) 9', 24', 41', 43', 55'; Mitchell 66'		Try: Wallis (2) 62' m, 76' c Con: Sheppard 76'

Butts Park Arena
Attendance: 2,102
Referee: Greg Macdonald

==== Round 4 ====
3 February 2023
19:45

(1 BP) Bedford Blues	38 – 17	London Scottish
Try: French (2) 16' c, 65' c Rylands 39' m Garside 42' c Hughes 54' c Matavesi 73' m Con: Grimboldy (4) 17', 43', 55', 66'		Try: Pandy 12' m McCallum 35' c Mehson 50' m Con: Chamberlain 36'

Goldington Road
Attendance: 2,537
Referee: Hamish Grant

4 February 2023
14:30

(1 BP) Coventry	42 – 12	Doncaster Knights
Try: Wilson 8' c Lane 26' c Penalty try 29'; Titherington 36' c Bridges 66' c Trinder 80' c Con: Mitchell (5) 8', 26', 36', 66', 80'		Try: Garside 6' c Holling 59' m Con: McBryde 6'

Butts Park Arena
Attendance: 1,798
Referee: Neil Chivers

==== Round 5 ====
11 February 2023
14:30

(BP) Doncaster Knights	66 – 12	London Scottish
Try: Ehizode 2' c Dolly 5' c Spittle (2) 15' c, 23' m Edgson (2) 49' c, 57' m Holden (2) 51' c, 63' c Edwards 71' c Yarnell 75' c Con: Dolly (5) 2', 5', 15', 49', 51'; McBryde (3) 63', 71', 75'		Try: Tuilagi 13' c King 54' m Con: Scott 13'

Castle Park
Attendance: 1,026
Referee: Mike Hudson

11 February 2023
15:00

(1 BP) Coventry	33 – 24	Bedford Blues (1 BP)
Try: Ma'asi (2) 9' c, 20' c Wilson 33' c Ball 40' m Penalty try 55'; Con: Mitchell (3) 9', 20', 33'		Try: Garside (2) 30' m, 46' c Hughes 66' c French 72' m Con: Grimoldy 46'; Maisey 66'

Butts Park Arena
Attendance: 1,621
Referee: Adam Leal

==== Round 6 ====
17 February 2023
19:45

(1 BP) London Scottish	31 – 47	Coventry (1 BP)
Try: Els 19' c Mehson (2) 36' c, 50' c Taulani 47' c Con: Chamberlain (4) 20', 37', 48', 51'; Pen: Chamberlain 3'		Try: Martin (2) 7' m, 32' c Nayalo 12' c Titherington (2) 15' c, 79' c James 39' c Wand 42' c Con: Mitchell (6) 13', 16', 33', 40', 43', 79'

Athletic Ground
Attendance: 550
Referee: Hamish Grant

18 February 2023
15:00

(1 BP) Bedford Blues	42 – 42	Doncaster Knights (1 BP)
Try: Uru (2) 8' c, 20' c Conway 12' c Arthur 32' c Worley 67' c Frost 74' c Con: Maisey (4) 10', 14', 21', 33'; Grimoldy (2) 68', 75'		Try: Kelly 15' c Olver (2) 40' c, 48' c Tait (2) 58' c, 80' c Penalty try 78'; Con: Dolly (5) 16', 40'+1, 49', 59', 80'+1

Goldington Road
Attendance: 2,459
Referee: Simon Harding

=== Pool C ===
Pool C
Pos	Team	Pld	W	D	L	PF	PA	PD	TB	LB	Pts	Qualification
1	Cornish Pirates (Q)	6	6	0	0	215	63	+152	5	0	29	Qualified for the semi-finals as group winner
2	Ampthill	6	3	0	3	131	117	+14	3	1	16	
3	Caldy	6	2	0	4	94	181	−87	2	1	11	
4	Richmond	6	1	0	5	102	181	−79	1	2	7	

Updated to match(es) played on 19 February 2023. Source: "Championship Cup 2022-23". englandrugby.com.
Rules for classification: If teams are level at any stage, tiebreakers are applied in the following order:
1. Number of matches won
2. Total number of tries scored
3. Total number of points for
4. Difference between points for and against
5. Fewest red cards
6. Coin toss
(Q) Qualified for the phase indicated

==== Round 1 ====
5 November 2022
14:00

Caldy	17 – 13	Ampthill (1 BP)
Try: Higginson 20' m Ridgeway 50' m Birch 54' c Con: Jones 55'		Try: Jackson-Richards 6' c Con: Rankin 7'; Pen: Rankin (2) 32', 43'

Paton Field
Attendance: 898
Referee: George Selwood

5 November 2022
15:00

Richmond	7 – 62	Cornish Pirates (1 BP)
Try: Massey 43' c Con: Duncan 44'		Try: Sirker (4) 2' m, 29' c, 36' c, 76' m Nagle-Taylor 7' c Norey (2) 18' c, 57' m Nelson (2) 64' c, 79' c Relton 70' m Con: Bazalgette (6) 7', 19', 30', 37', 65', 80'

Athletic Ground
Attendance: 700
Referee: Neil Chivers

==== Round 2 ====
12 November 2022
14:00

(1 BP) Ampthill	29 – 5	Richmond
Try: Strong (4) 7' m, 19' c, 26' m, 68' m Skelcey 60' c Con: Rankin (2) 20', 61'		Try: Stafford 65' m

Dillingham Park
Attendance: 526
Referee: Adam Wookey

12 November 2022
14:00

Caldy	7 – 26	Cornish Pirates (1 BP)
Try: Caine 46' c Con: Jones 47'		Try: Relton (2) 9' c, 67' c Wyatt 53' m Nagle-Taylor 79' c Con: Bazalgette (2) 10', 68'; Penny 80'

Paton Field
Attendance: 1,067
Referee: Charlie Gayther

==== Round 3 ====
18 November 2022
19:30

(1 BP) Richmond	40 – 15	Caldy
Try: Torpey (2) 7' c, 21' c O'Meara 29' c Saysell (3) 32' c, 40' m, 49' c Con: Johnston (5) 7', 21', 29', 33', 49'		Try: Royle (3) 37', 66', 78'

Athletic Ground
Attendance: 624
Referee: Neil Chivers

20 November 2022
14:30

(1 BP) Cornish Pirates	27 – 18	Ampthill
Try: Tucker 24' c Norey 40' c Trewin 46' m Relton 77' m Con: Bazalgette (2) 25', 40'; Pen: Robson 72'		Try: Montgomery 59' c Rankin 79' m Con: Rankin 60'; Pen: Rankin (2) 22', 32'

Mennaye Field
Attendance: 1,343
Referee: Nicolas Wood

==== Round 4 ====
4 February 2023
14:00

(1 BP) Ampthill	31 – 26	Caldy (2 BP)
Try: Blackmore (2) 2' m, 12' m Harmes 6' c Finlay 14' c Hallett 19' c Con: Hadwick (3) 7', 14', 20'		Try: Barker 17' c Cartmill (2) 29' m, 80' c Penalty try 59'; Con: Jones (2) 18', 80'

Dillingham Park
Attendance: 483
Referee: Nicolas Wood

4 February 2023
14:30

(1 BP) Cornish Pirates	25 – 12	Richmond
Try: Britton 11' m Beaton 29' c Penny 66' m Relton 78' m Con: Bazalgette 30'; Pen: Bazalgette 5'		Try: Makele 42' m Vajner 74' c Con: Burrage 75'

Mennaye Field
Attendance: 1,294
Referee: Sara Cox

==== Round 5 ====
10 February 2023
19:30

(1 BP) Richmond	19 – 26	Ampthill (1 BP)
Try: Spring 19' c Monson 55' m Caddy 67' c Con: Johnston (2) 20', 68'		Try: Blackmore 21' c Rankin 25' m Skelcey 42' c Green 64' c Con: Hardwick (3) 22', 43', 65'

Athletic Ground
Attendance: 619
Referee: Joe James

11 February 2023
14:30

(1 BP) Cornish Pirates	52 – 5	Caldy
Try: Williams 10' c King 19' c Elderkin 38' m Nelson 42' c Haylor 61' c Crane 67' m Cant 71' c Stacey 76' c Con: Bazalgette (3) 10', 19', 42'; Penny (3) 62', 71', 76'		Try: Stagg 30' m

Mennaye Field
Attendance: 1,252
Referee: Neil Chivers

==== Round 6 ====
18 February 2023
14:00

Ampthill	14 – 23	Cornish Pirates
Try: Ryan 26' c Blackmore 51' c Con: Hardwick (2) 27', 52'		Try: Stevens 20' c Cant 39' m Andrew 66' m Con: Robson 21'; Pen: Robson (2) 8', 55'

Dillingham Park
Attendance: 537
Referee: Jonathan Cook

18 February 2023
14:00

(1 BP) Caldy	24 – 19	Richmond (1 BP)
Try: Aigbokhae 26' m (2) Hayes 34' c, 40' m Royle 63' c Con: Gourlay (2) 35', 64'		Try: Wakeling 4' m Scott 30' c Makele 38' c Con: Johnston (2) 31', 39'

Paton Field
Attendance: 871
Referee: Charlie Gayther

== Knock-out stage ==
The four qualifiers were seeded according to performance in the pool stage - with the two best performing pool winners being ranked as seeds 1 and 2, while the third group winner and best group runner up were ranked as seeds 3 and 4. The top four seeds hosted the quarter-finals against the lower seeds, in a 1 v 4, 2 v 3 format. However, if two teams qualified from the same pool they could not be drawn together. For the final the highest ranked seed would have home advantage.

Teams were ranked by:

1 – competition points (4 for a win, 2 for a draw)
2 – where competition points are equal, greatest number of wins
3 – where the number of wins are equal, greatest number of tries scored
4 – where the number of tries are equal, aggregate points difference
5 – where the aggregate points difference are equal, greatest number of points scored
6 – where the greatest number of points are equal, least red cards
7 – if red cards are equal, then ranking will be decided by the toss of a coin

Rank	Pool	Pool leaders/best runner-up	Pts	Wins	TF	Diff	PF
1	C	Cornish Pirates	29	6	33	152	215
2	A	Ealing Trailfinders	26	5	38	136	248
3	A	Jersey Reds	25	5	32	110	212
4	B	Doncaster Knights	23	4	30	60	195
5	B	Coventry	21	4	30	71	202
6	C	Ampthill	16	3	19	14	131

Semi-finals
6 May 2023
Ealing Trailfinders	32
Doncaster Knights	0
5 May 2023
Cornish Pirates	24
Jersey Reds	35

Final
13 May 2023
Ealing Trailfinders	35
Jersey Reds	31

=== Semi-finals ===
5 May 2023
19:30

Cornish Pirates	24 – 35	Jersey Reds
Try: Crane 9' m Relton 38' c Parata 52' c Schwarz 78' m Con: Robson (2) 39', 53		Try: Brown (2) 1' c, 55' c Clarke 22' c Penalty try 45'; Woollett 65' c Con: Bennett (4) 2', 23', 56', 66'

Mennaye Field
Attendance: 1,642
Referee: Dan Jones

6 May 2023
15:00

Ealing Trailfinders	32 – 0	Doncaster Knights
Try: Bird-Tulloch (2) 9' c, 34' c Holmes (2) 29' c, 71' m Con: Daniels (3) 10', 30', 35'; Pen: Daniels (2) 26', 38'

Trailfinders Sports Ground
Attendance: 754
Referee: Harry Walbaum

=== Final ===
13 May 2023
14:00

Ealing Trailfinders	35 – 31	Jersey Reds
Try: Holmes (2) 10' c, 44' c Digby 62' c Bodilly 64' c Davis 72' c Con: Daniels 11', 45', 63', 65', 73'		Try: Holgate (2) 12' m, 79' m Harris 48' c Woollett (2) 67' c, 80' c Con: Bennett (3) 49', 67', 80'

Trailfinders Sports Ground
Attendance: 1,225
Referee: Hamish Smales

== Attendances ==
Club	Home Games	Total	Average	Highest	Lowest	% Capacity
Ampthill	3	1,546	515	537	483	17%
Bedford Blues	3	8,041	2,680	3,045	2,459	54%
Caldy	3	2,836	945	1,067	871	24%
Cornish Pirates	4	5,531	1,383	1,642	1,252	35%
Coventry	3	5,521	1,840	2,102	1,621	46%
Doncaster Knights	3	2,641	880	1,026	726	17%
Ealing Trailfinders	5	4,368	874	1,225	672	17%
Hartpury	3	2,046	682	721	625	34%
Jersey Reds	3	3,278	1,093	1,204	908	27%
London Scottish	3	1,667	556	617	500	12%
Nottingham	3	2,024	675	908	515	19%
Richmond	3	1,943	648	700	619	14%

== Leading scorers ==
Note: Flags to the left of player names indicate national team as has been defined under World Rugby eligibility rules, or primary nationality for players who have not yet earned international senior caps. Players may hold one or more non-WR nationalities.

=== Most points ===
As of 13 May 2023

Rank	Player	Club	Points
1	(South Africa) Russell Bennett	Jersey Reds	44
2	(England) Will Maisey	Bedford Blues	37
3	(England) Evan Mitchell	Coventry	32
4	(England) Harry Bazalgette	Cornish Pirates	31
4	(Tonga) Patrick Pellegrini	Coventry	31
5	(Ireland) Conor Rankin	Ampthill	30
5	(England) Arthur Relton	Cornish Pirates	30
5	(England) Peter Roberts	Doncaster Knights	30
5	(England) Simon Uzokwe	Ealing Trailfinders	30
5	(England) David Williams	Nottingham	30

=== Most tries ===
As of 13 May 2023

Rank	Player	Club	Tries
1	(England) Arthur Relton	Cornish Pirates	6
1	(England) Peter Roberts	Doncaster Knights	6
1	(England) Simon Uzokwe	Ealing Trailfinders	6
1	(England) David Williams	Nottingham	6
2	(Wales) Jonah Holmes	Ealing Trailfinders	5
2	(Australia) Ben Woollett	Jersey Reds	5
3	(England) Sydney Blackmore	Ampthill	4
3	(England) Will Brown	Jersey Reds	4
3	(England) Brad Denty	Hartpury	4
3	(England) Jake Garside	Bedford Blues	4
3	(England) James Hadfield	Jersey Reds	4
3	(England) Suva Ma'asi	Coventry	4
3	(England) Nick Royle	Caldy	4
3	(England) Callum Sirker	Cornish Pirates	4
3	(England) Luke Stratford	Hartpury	4
3	(Wales) Morgan Strong	Ampthill	4
3	(England) Lucas Titherington	Coventry	4
3	(Scotland) Alun Walker	Ealing Trailfinders	4

== See also ==
- 2022–23 RFU Championship
- British and Irish Cup
- Premiership Rugby Cup
