= 2018–19 RFU Championship =

2018–19 Greene King IPA Championship
- Countries: England; Jersey
- Date: 31 August 2018 – 27 April 2019
- Champions: London Irish (2nd title)
- Runners-up: Ealing Trailfinders
- Relegated: Richmond
- Matches played: 132
- Attendance: 226,061 (average 1,713 per match)
- Highest attendance: 10,106; London Irish v Doncaster Knights; 23 March 2019
- Lowest attendance: 602; Richmond v Hartpury; 29 September 2018
- Tries scored: 913 (average 6.9 per match)
- Top point scorer: (Canada) Shane O'Leary (Nottingham); 186 points
- Top try scorer: (England) Dean Adamson (Bedford Blues); 16 tries

The 2018–19 RFU Championship, known for sponsorship reasons as the Greene King IPA Championship, is the tenth season of the professionalised format of the RFU Championship, the second tier of the English rugby union league system run by the Rugby Football Union. It is contested by eleven English clubs and one from Jersey in the Channel Islands. Greene King sponsors the competition for a sixth successive season. Clubs in the league also competed in the inaugural RFU Championship Cup.

On 19 April 2019 London Irish were declared champions with a round to go, following an emphatic win away against struggling Richmond, claiming promotion back to the Premiership for the 2019–20 season, in what was their second Championship title in three seasons. The next day (20 April), Richmond were relegated following relegation rivals Hartpury's victory at home against London Scottish. Richmond would drop to the 2019–20 National League 1.

Coventry had the best campaign of a promoted club since the Championship's inception back in 2009–10 (regular season only), amassing 51 points on the way to an 8th-place finish - surpassing London Scottish's 45 point, 8th-place finish back in 2011–12.

== Structure ==
The Championship's structure has all the teams playing each other on a home and away basis. The first placed team in the competition is promoted to the Premiership; providing that club's ground fulfills the Rugby Football Union's Minimum Standards Criteria while the bottom side is relegated to National League 1. As part of an agreement with the RFU, each club will receive £530,000 funding. The British and Irish Cup, which the RFU Championship clubs played in with Welsh and Irish clubs, was scrapped due to the Championship clubs withdrawing and is to be replaced by a new cup competition – the RFU Championship Cup.

== Teams ==
Locations of the 2018–19 RFU Championship teams
Greater London RFU Championship teams

On 24 March 2018 Rotherham Titans were relegated with three games to go, after losing away to Jersey Reds. Despite seeing some improvements in the second half of the season, the Yorkshire club were easily the weakest side in the division, dropping to 2018–19 National League 1, the lowest level the club have played for fourteen seasons. Promoted in their place were the winners of 2017–18 National League 1, Coventry, who return to the second tier for the first time since being relegated at the end of the 2009–10 season.

On 7 April 2018 Bristol were crowned champions of the 2017–18 season with two games to go following title rivals Ealing Trailfinders defeat that day to Doncaster Knights. They were therefore promoted to Premiership Rugby. In winning the championship Bristol also became the most decorated tier 2 side in English league history with four league titles to-date. They are replaced by London Irish who return to the Championship after just one year in the Premiership.

Club	Stadium	Capacity	Area	Previous season
Bedford Blues	Goldington Road	5,000 (1,700 seats)	Bedford, Bedfordshire	3rd
Cornish Pirates	Mennaye Field	4,000 (2,200 seats)	Penzance, Cornwall	4th
Coventry	Butts Park Arena	4,000 (3,000 Seats)	Coventry, West Midlands	Promoted from National 1
Doncaster Knights	Castle Park	5,000 (1,650 seats)	Doncaster, South Yorkshire	7th
Ealing Trailfinders	Trailfinders Sports Ground	4,000 (2,200 seats) (Note: Trailfinders Sports Ground capacity raised from 3,020 (1,200 seats) to 4,000 (2,200 seats) on 3 February 2019.)	West Ealing, London	Runners up
Hartpury College	Gillman's Ground	2,000	Hartpury, Gloucestershire	10th
Jersey Reds	Stade Santander International	4,000	Saint Peter, Jersey	5th
London Irish	Madejski Stadium	24,161 (Note: Although Madejski's full capacity is 24,161, for most matches only the West Stand will be open with capacity of 7,579.)	Reading, Berkshire	Relegated from Premiership
London Scottish	Athletic Ground	4,500 (1,000 seats)	Richmond, London	11th
Nottingham	Lady Bay Sports Ground	3,000	Nottingham, Nottinghamshire	8th
Richmond	Athletic Ground	4,500 (1,000 seats)	Richmond, London	9th
Yorkshire Carnegie	Emerald Headingley Stadium	21,062	Leeds, West Yorkshire	6th

== Table ==
2018–19 RFU Championship table
Pos	Team	Pld	W	D	L	PF	PA	PD	TB	LB	Pts	Qualification
1	London Irish (C)	22	20	0	2	835	340	+495	18	1	99	Promotion place
2	Ealing Trailfinders	22	17	0	5	733	503	+230	16	2	86	
3	Bedford Blues	22	13	0	9	632	603	+29	11	6	69	
4	Jersey Reds	22	12	0	10	554	442	+112	9	6	63	
5	Cornish Pirates	22	10	0	12	556	507	+49	12	7	59	
6	Yorkshire Carnegie	22	11	0	11	475	549	−74	8	3	55	
7	Nottingham	22	10	1	11	508	597	−89	7	3	52	
8	Coventry	22	9	1	12	497	637	−140	7	6	51	
9	London Scottish	22	8	0	14	468	616	−148	7	4	43	
10	Doncaster Knights	22	8	0	14	546	617	−71	6	4	42	
11	Hartpury College	22	7	0	15	415	634	−219	4	4	36	
12	Richmond (R)	22	6	0	16	430	604	−174	4	5	33	Relegation place

Updated to match(es) played on 21 April 2019. Source: "Greene King IPA Championship". England Rugby.
Rules for classification: If teams are level at any stage, tiebreakers are applied in the following order:
1. Number of matches won
2. Difference between points for and against
3. Total number of points for
4. Aggregate number of points scored in matches between tied teams
5. Number of matches won excluding the first match, then the second and so on until the tie is settled

== Fixtures & Results ==
Fixtures for the season were announced by the RFU on 22 June 2018.

=== Round 1 ===
31 August 2018
19:45

Hartpury College	16 – 5	Yorkshire Carnegie
	Report

Gillman's Ground
Attendance: 876
Referee: Andrew Jackson

1 September 2018
15:00

Coventry	20 – 15	Jersey Reds (1 BP)
	Report

Butts Park Arena
Attendance: 2,003
Referee: Christophe Ridley

1 September 2018
15:00

Richmond	24 – 19	London Scottish (1 BP)
	Report

Athletic Ground
Attendance: 1,506
Referee: Simon Harding

1 September 2018
19:15

Ealing Trailfinders	7 – 20	London Irish
	Report

Trailfinders Sports Ground
Attendance: 2,205
Referee: Luke Pearce

2 September 2018
14:30

(1 BP) Cornish Pirates	31 – 24	Doncaster Knights (1 BP)
	Report

Mennaye Field
Attendance: 1,591
Referee: Tom Foley

2 September 2018
15:00

(1 BP) Nottingham	21 – 27	Bedford Blues
	Report

Lady Bay Sports Ground
Attendance: 1,145
Referee: Matthew O’Grady

=== Round 2 ===
8 September 2018
14:30

Doncaster Knights	28 – 17	Hartpury College
	Report

Castle Park
Attendance: 888
Referee: John Meridith

8 September 2018
15:00

(1 BP) Bedford Blues	26 – 22	Jersey Reds (1 BP)
	Report

Goldington Road
Attendance: 2,364
Referee: Dean Richards

8 September 2018
15:00

(1 BP) London Irish	52 – 20	Nottingham
	Report

Madejski Stadium
Attendance: 2,985
Referee: Sara Cox

8 September 2018
15:00

(2 BP) London Scottish	31 – 36	Ealing Trailfinders (1 BP)
	Report

Athletic Ground
Attendance: 1,065
Referee: Michael Hudson

9 September 2018
14:30

(1 BP) Cornish Pirates	35 – 10	Coventry
	Report

Mennaye Field
Attendance: 1,648
Referee: Simon Harding

9 September 2018
15:00

(1 BP) Yorkshire Carnegie	24 – 7	Richmond
	Report

Emerald Headingley Stadium
Attendance: 1,568
Referee: Greg Macdonald

=== Round 3 ===
14 September 2018
19:45

(1 BP) Nottingham	29 – 19	London Scottish
	Report

Lady Bay Sports Ground
Attendance: 1,135
Referee: Greg MacDonald

15 September 2018
14:30

Hartpury College	17 – 46	Cornish Pirates (1 BP)
	Report

Gillman's Ground
Attendance: 973
Referee: Michael Hudson

15 September 2018
15:00

(1 BP) Coventry	34 – 27	Bedford Blues (2 BP)
	Report

Butts Park Arena
Attendance: 2,058
Referee: John Meredith

15 September 2018
15:00

(1 BP) Ealing Trailfinders	39 – 24	Yorkshire Carnegie
	Report

Trailfinders Sports Ground
Attendance: 933
Referee: Matt O'Grady

15 September 2018
15:00

Richmond	17 – 28	Doncaster Knights
	Report

Athletic Ground
Attendance: 697
Referee: Dean Richards

16 September 2018

Jersey Reds	P – P (Note: Jersey Reds' round 3 home game against London Irish was rescheduled to 3 November due to its proximity to Jersey International Air Display making availability of air transport and accommodation difficult.)	London Irish

Stade Santander International

- Postponed. Game to be rescheduled for 3 November 2018.

=== Round 4 ===
22 September 2018
14:00

London Scottish	27 – 24	Jersey Reds (2 BP)
	Report

Athletic Ground
Attendance: 1,022
Referee: Simon Harding

22 September 2018
14:30

Doncaster Knights	22 – 38	Ealing Trailfinders (1 BP)
	Report

Castle Park
Attendance: 926
Referee: Matt Carley

22 September 2018
14:30

Hartpury College	23 – 17	Coventry (1 BP)
	Report

Gillman's Ground
Attendance: 953
Referee: Neil Chivers

23 September 2018
14:30

(1 BP) Cornish Pirates	29 – 19	Richmond
	Report

Mennaye Field
Attendance: 1,467
Referee: John Stephens

23 September 2018
15:00

(1 BP) London Irish	29 – 20	Bedford Blues
	Report

Madejski Stadium
Attendance: 2,632
Referee: Matthew O'Grady

23 September 2018
15:00

Yorkshire Carnegie	17 – 36	Nottingham (1 BP)
	Report

Emerald Headingley Stadium
Attendance: 1,372
Referee: Dean Richards

=== Round 5 ===
28 September 2018
19:45

(1 BP) Jersey Reds	36 – 19	Yorkshire Carnegie
	Report

Stade Santander International
Attendance: 1,103
Referee: Adam Leal

28 September 2018
19:45

Nottingham	20 – 15	Doncaster Knights (1 BP)
	Report

Lady Bay Sports Ground
Attendance: 1,337
Referee: Tim Wigglesworth

29 September 2018
15:00

(1 BP) Bedford Blues	23 – 26	London Scottish
	Report

Goldington Road
Attendance: 2,221
Referee: Christophe Ridley

29 September 2018
15:00

(1 BP) Coventry	17 – 21	London Irish
	Report

Butts Park Arena
Attendance: 2,943
Referee: Michael Hudson

29 September 2018
15:00

(1 BP) Ealing Trailfinders	41 – 35	Cornish Pirates (2 BP)
	Report

Trailfinders Sports Ground
Attendance: 954
Referee: John Meredith

29 September 2018
15:00

(1BP) Richmond	38 – 12	Hartpury College
	Report

Athletic Ground
Attendance: 602
Referee: Hamish Smales

=== Round 6 ===
6 October 2018
14:30

Doncaster Knights	22 – 47	Jersey Reds (1 BP)
	Report

Castle Park
Attendance: 996
Referee: John Meredith

6 October 2018
14:30

(1 BP) Hartpury College	25 – 32	Ealing Trailfinders (1 BP)
	Report

Gillman's Ground
Attendance: 637
Referee: Michael Hudson

6 October 2018
15:00

Richmond	22 – 5	Coventry
	Report

Athletic Ground
Attendance: 693
Referee: Ian Tempest

7 October 2018
14:30

(1 BP) Cornish Pirates	36 – 28	Nottingham (2 BP)
	Report

Mennaye Field
Attendance: 1,639
Referee: Sara Cox

7 October 2018
15:00

London Scottish	17 – 54	London Irish (1 BP)
	Report

Athletic Ground
Attendance: 2,321
Referee: Karl Dickson

7 October 2018
15:00

(1 BP) Yorkshire Carnegie	21 – 28	Bedford Blues
	Report

Emerald Headingley Stadium
Attendance: 1,362
Referee: Greg MacDonald

=== Round 7 ===
13 October 2018
15:00

(1 BP) Bedford Blues	29 – 28	Doncaster Knights (2 BP)
	Report

Goldington Road
Attendance: 2,671
Referee: Adam Leal

13 October 2018
15:00

(1 BP) Coventry	29 – 27	London Scottish (2 BP)
	Report

Butts Park Arena
Attendance: 2,127
Referee: Hamish Smales

13 October 2018
15:00

(1 BP) Ealing Trailfinders	38 – 32	Richmond (2 BP)
	Report

Trailfinders Sports Ground
Attendance: 912
Referee: Tim Wigglesworth

13 October 2018
15:00

(1 BP) London Irish	72 – 5	Yorkshire Carnegie
	Report

Madejski Stadium
Attendance: 2,947
Referee: John Meredith

13 October 2018
15:00

Jersey Reds	33 – 10	Cornish Pirates
	Report

Stade Santander International
Attendance: 1,660
Referee: Neil Chivers

14 October 2018
15:00

Nottingham	26 – 7	Hartpury College
	Report

Lady Bay Sports Ground
Attendance: 930

=== Round 8 ===
19 October 2018
20:00

Yorkshire Carnegie	5 – 17	London Scottish
	Report

Emerald Headingley Stadium
Attendance: 1,720
Referee: Anthony Woodthorpe

20 October 2018
14:30

Doncaster Knights	17 - 26	London Irish (1 BP)
	Report

Castle Park
Attendance: 1,279
Referee: Neil Chivers

20 October 2018
14:30

Hartpury College	14 – 52	Jersey Reds (1 BP)
	Report

Gillman's Ground
Attendance: 793
Referee: George Selwood

20 October 2018
15:00

(1 BP) Ealing Trailfinders	60 – 25	Coventry (1 BP)
	Report

Trailfinders Sports Ground
Attendance: 740
Referee: Ben Wilde

20 October 2018
15:00

Richmond	21 – 35	Nottingham (1 BP)
	Report

Athletic Ground
Attendance: 977
Referee: Matt Turvey

21 October 2018
14:30

(2 BP) Cornish Pirates	29 – 30	Bedford Blues
	Report

Mennaye Field
Attendance: 1,703
Referee: Michael Hudson

=== Round 9 ===
26 October 2018
19:45

(1 BP) Nottingham	42 – 27	Ealing Trailfinders
	Report

Lady Bay Sports Ground
Attendance: 1,397
Referee: Anthony Woodthorpe

27 October 2018
15:00

(1 BP) Bedford Blues	26 – 24	Hartpury College (2 BP)
	Report

Goldington Road
Attendance: 1,988
Referee: Matthew Carley

27 October 2018
15:00

Coventry	20 – 15	Yorkshire Carnegie (1 BP)
	Report

Butts Park Arena
Attendance: 1,999
Referee: Matt O'Grady

27 October 2018
15:00

(1 BP) Jersey Reds	28 – 21	Richmond (1 BP)
	Report

Stade Santander International
Attendance: 1,418
Referee: Karl Dickson

27 October 2018
15:00

(1 BP) London Irish	38 – 29	Cornish Pirates (1 BP)
	Report

Madejski Stadium
Attendance: 4,624
Referee: Ian Tempest

27 October 2018
15:00

(1 BP) London Scottish	20 – 36	Doncaster Knights (1 BP)
	Report

Athletic Ground
Attendance: 1,230
Referee: Hamish Smales

=== Round 3 (rescheduled game) ===
3 November 2018
14:00

Jersey Reds	17 – 14	London Irish (1BP)
	Report

Stade Santander International
Attendance: 2,515
Referee: Luke Pearce

- Game rescheduled from 16 September 2018.

=== Round 10 ===
22 December 2018
14:00

Ealing Trailfinders	19 – 14	Jersey Reds (1 BP)
	Report

Trailfinders Sports Ground
Attendance: 1,114
Referee: Anthony Woodthorpe

22 December 2018
15:15

Richmond	11 – 27	Bedford Blues
	Report

Athletic Ground
Attendance: 2,098
Referee: Simon Harding

23 December 2018
15:00

Nottingham	15 – 15	Coventry
	Report

Lady Bay Sports Ground
Attendance: 1,515
Referee: Tim Wigglesworth

28 December 2018
19:45

Hartpury College	5–38	London Irish (1 BP)
	Report

Gillman's Ground
Attendance: 1,531
Referee: Greg MacDonald

29 December 2018
14:30

Doncaster Knights	22–30	Yorkshire Carnegie (1 BP)
	Report

Castle Park
Attendance: 2,006
Referee: Michael Hudson

30 December 2018
14:30

(1 BP) Cornish Pirates	27–0	London Scottish
	Report

Mennaye Field
Attendance: 2,963
Referee: Dean Richards

=== Round 11 ===
11 January 2019
19:45

London Scottish	25 – 8	Hartpury College
	Report

Athletic Ground
Attendance: 1,111
Referee: Simon Harding

12 January 2019
15:00

Bedford Blues	23 – 18	Ealing Trailfinders (1 BP)
	Report

Goldington Road
Attendance: 2,392
Referee: Michael Hudson

12 January 2019
15:00

(1 BP) Coventry	17 – 23	Doncaster Knights
	Report

Butts Park Arena
Attendance: 2,147
Referee: Tim Wigglesworth

12 January 2019
15:00

(1 BP) Jersey Reds	41 – 16	Nottingham
	Report

Stade Santander International
Attendance: 1,337
Referee: Dean Richards

13 January 2019
15:00

(1 BP) London Irish	47 – 12	Richmond
	Report

Madejski Stadium
Attendance: 3,002
Referee: Neil Chivers

13 January 2019
15:00

Yorkshire Carnegie	18 – 12	Cornish Pirates (1 BP)
	Report

Emerald Headingley Stadium
Attendance: 1,637
Referee: Matthew O'Grady

=== Round 12 ===
18 January 2019
19:45

(2 BP) Nottingham	29 – 35	London Irish (1 BP)
	Report

Lady Bay Sports Ground
Attendance: 1,576
Referee: Matthew O'Grady

19 January 2019
14:00

(1 BP) Jersey Reds	29 – 13	Bedford Blues
	Report

Stade Santander International
Attendance: 1,579
Referee: Sara Cox

19 January 2019
14:30

Hartpury College	21 – 48	Doncaster Knights (1 BP)
	Report

Gillman's Ground
Attendance: 957
Referee: Michael Hudson

19 January 2019
15:00

Coventry	18 – 17	Cornish Pirates (1 BP)
	Report

Butts Park Arena
Attendance: 2,273
Referee: Neil Chivers

19 January 2019
15:00

(1 BP) Ealing Trailfinders	34 – 26	London Scottish (1 BP)
	Report

Trailfinders Sports Ground
Attendance: 782
Referee: John Meredith

19 January 2019
15:00

(1 BP) Richmond	16 – 22	Yorkshire Carnegie
	Report

Athletic Ground
Attendance: 1,015
Referee: Fergus Kirby

=== Round 13 ===
26 January 2019
14:30

(1 BP) Doncaster Knights	34 – 7	Richmond
	Report

Castle Park
Attendance: 868
Referee: Andrew Jackson

26 January 2019
15:00

(1 BP) Bedford Blues	53 – 52	Coventry (2 BP)
	Report

Goldington Road
Attendance: 2,787
Referee: JP Doyle

26 January 2019
15:00

(1 BP) London Scottish	31 – 10	Nottingham
	Report

Athletic Ground
Attendance: 1,271
Referee: Tim Wigglesworth

27 January 2019
13:45

(1 BP) London Irish	27 – 3	Jersey Reds
	Report

Madejski Stadium
Attendance: 3,058
Referee: Ian Tempest

27 January 2019
14:30

(1 BP) Cornish Pirates	41 – 24	Hartpury College
	Report

Mennaye Field
Attendance: 1,448
Referee: Tom Foley

27 January 2019
15:00

Yorkshire Carnegie	7 – 29	Ealing Trailfinders (1 BP)
	Report

Emerald Headingley Stadium
Attendance: 1,490
Referee: Greg Macdonald

=== Round 14 ===
8 February 2019
19:45

Nottingham	15 – 33	Yorkshire Carnegie (1 BP)
	Report

Lady Bay Sports Ground
Attendance: 1,124
Referee: Sara Cox

9 February 2019
14:00

Jersey Reds	14 – 24	London Scottish
	Report

Stade Santander International
Attendance: 1,034
Referee: Adam Leal

9 February 2019
15:00

Bedford Blues	23 – 26	London Irish (1 BP)
	Report

Goldington Road
Attendance: 2,851
Referee: Tom Foley

9 February 2019
15:00

Coventry	24 – 17	Hartpury College (1 BP)
	Report

Butts Park Arena
Attendance: 2,098
Referee: JP Doyle

9 February 2019
15:00

(1 BP) Ealing Trailfinders	33 – 24	Doncaster Knights
	Report

Trailfinders Sports Ground
Attendance: 685
Referee: Karl Dickson

9 February 2019
15:00

Richmond	10 – 23	Cornish Pirates (1 BP)
	Report

Athletic Ground
Attendance: 1,175
Referee: Greg MacDonald

=== Round 15 ===
15 February 2019
19:45

(1 BP) Hartpury College	36 – 12	Richmond
	Report

Gillman's Ground
Attendance: 1,011
Referee: Andrew Jackson

16 February 2019
14:30

Cornish Pirates	8 – 28	Ealing Trailfinders (1 BP)
	Report

Mennaye Field
Attendance: 1,629
Referee: Michael Hudson

16 February 2019
14:30

(1 BP) Doncaster Knights	23 – 25	Nottingham
	Report

Castle Park
Attendance: 1,347
Referee: Simon Harding

16 February 2019
14:45

(1 BP) London Irish	52 – 22	Coventry
	Report

Madejski Stadium
Attendance: 2,666
Referee: Alivereti Veitokani

16 February 2019
15:00

London Scottish	17 – 36	Bedford Blues (1 BP)
	Report

Athletic Ground
Attendance: 1,438
Referee: Sara Cox

17 February 2019
15:00

Yorkshire Carnegie	10–28	Jersey Reds
	Report

Emerald Headingley Stadium
Attendance: 1,726
Referee: Matthew O'Grady

=== Round 16 ===
1 March 2019
19:45

(2 BP) Bedford Blues	44 – 45	Yorkshire Carnegie (1 BP)
	Report

Goldington Road
Attendance: 2,356
Referee: Matt Turvey

1 March 2019
19:45

(1 BP) Jersey Reds	41 – 21	Doncaster Knights
	Report

Stade Santander International
Attendance: 1,722
Referee: Neil Chivers

1 March 2019
19:45

Nottingham	20 – 18	Cornish Pirates (1 BP)
	Report

Lady Bay Sports Ground
Attendance: 1,190
Referee: Andrew Jackson

2 March 2019
15:00

Coventry	20 – 16	Richmond (1 BP)
	Report

Butts Park Arena
Attendance: 2,409
Referee: Christophe Ridley

2 March 2019
15:00

Ealing Trailfinders	22 – 14	Hartpury College
	Report

Trailfinders Sports Ground
Attendance: 707
Referee: Sara Cox

2 March 2019
15:00

(1 BP) London Irish	52 – 21	London Scottish
	Report

Madejski Stadium
Attendance: 2,067
Referee: Greg Macdonald

=== Round 17 ===
8 March 2019
19:45

Hartpury College	21 – 20	Nottingham (1 BP)
	Report

Gillman's Ground
Attendance: 835
Referee: Hamish Smales

8 March 2019
19:45

London Scottish	15 – 14	Coventry (1 BP)
	Report

Athletic Ground
Attendance: 1,155
Referee: Matt Turvey

9 March 2019
14:00

Richmond	24 – 22	Ealing Trailfinders (2 BP)
	Report

Athletic Ground
Attendance: 998
Referee: Simon Harding

9 March 2019
14:30

Doncaster Knights	27 – 20	Bedford Blues (1 BP)
	Report

Castle Park
Attendance: 1,004
Referee: Anthony Woodthorpe

10 March 2019
14:30

(1 BP) Cornish Pirates	7 – 8	Jersey Reds
	Report

Mennaye Field
Attendance: 1,547
Referee: Dean Richards

10 March 2019
15:00

(1 BP) Yorkshire Carnegie	26 – 12	London Irish
	Report

Emerald Headingley Stadium
Attendance: 1,670
Referee: Jack Makepeace

=== Round 18 ===
23 March 2019
15:00

(1 BP) Bedford Blues	32 – 14	Cornish Pirates
	Report

Goldington Road
Attendance: 2,862
Referee: Michael Hudson

23 March 2019
15:00

Coventry	20 – 61	Ealing Trailfinders (1 BP)
	Report

Butts Park Arena
Attendance: 2,522
Referee: Tim Wigglesworth

23 March 2019
15:00

(1 BP) Jersey Reds	7 – 10	Hartpury College
	Report

Stade Santander International
Attendance: 1,611
Referee: Andrew Jackson

23 March 2019
15:00

(1 BP) London Irish	49 – 12	Doncaster Knights
	Report

Madejski Stadium
Attendance: 10,106
Referee: Dean Richards

23 March 2019
15:00

London Scottish	20 – 42	Yorkshire Carnegie (1 BP)
	Report

Athletic Ground
Attendance: 1,151
Referee: Neil Chivers

24 March 2019
15:00

Nottingham	13 – 35	Richmond (1 BP)
	Report

Lady Bay Sports Ground
Attendance: 1,216
Referee: Greg MacDonald

=== Round 19 ===
30 March 2019
14:15

Richmond	17 – 38	Jersey Reds (1 BP)
	Report

Athletic Ground
Attendance: 822
Referee: Hamish Smales

30 March 2019
14:30

Cornish Pirates	7 – 35	London Irish (1 BP)
	Report

Mennaye Field
Attendance: 2,722
Referee: JP Doyle

30 March 2019
14:30

(1 BP) Doncaster Knights	28 – 21	London Scottish (1 BP)
	Report

Castle Park
Attendance: 1,309
Referee: John Meredith

30 March 2019
14:30

(1 BP) Hartpury College	28 – 26	Bedford Blues (2 BP)
	Report

Gillman's Ground
Attendance: 895
Referee: Adam Leal

30 March 2019
15:00

(1 BP) Ealing Trailfinders	35 – 19	Nottingham
	Report

Trailfinders Sports Ground
Attendance: 731
Referee: Fergus Kirby

31 March 2019
15:00

(1 BP) Yorkshire Carnegie	35 – 10	Coventry
	Report

Emerald Headingley Stadium
Attendance: 1,271
Referee: Simon Harding

=== Round 20 ===
13 April 2019
14:00

Jersey Reds	14 – 45	Ealing Trailfinders (1 BP)
	Report

Stade Santander International
Attendance: 1,806
Referee: Tim Wigglesworth

13 April 2019
15:00

(1 BP) Bedford Blues	41 – 35	Richmond (2 BP)
	Report

Goldington Road
Attendance: 2,436
Referee: Craig Maxwell-Keys

13 April 2019
15:00

(2 BP) Coventry	31 – 32	Nottingham (1 BP)
	Report

Butts Park Arena
Attendance: 2,802
Referee: Alex Thomas

13 April 2019
15:00

(1 BP) London Scottish	26 – 22	Cornish Pirates (1 BP)
	Report

Athletic Ground
Attendance: 1,184
Referee: Andrew Jackson

14 April 2019
15:00

(1 BP) London Irish	57 – 12	Hartpury College
	Report

Madejski Stadium
Attendance: 2,318
Referee: Matthew O’Grady

14 April 2019
15:00

Yorkshire Carnegie	21 – 12	Doncaster Knights
	Report

Emerald Headingley Stadium
Attendance: 1,283
Referee: Karl Dickson

=== Round 21 ===
19 April 2019
15:00

Richmond	7 – 46	London Irish (1 BP)
	Report

Athletic Ground
Attendance: 2,743
Referee: Karl Dickson

- London Irish are champions. Richmond are relegated following Hartpury's victory on 20 April.

19 April 2019
19:45

Nottingham	24 – 20	Jersey Reds (1 BP)
	Report

Lady Bay Sports Ground
Attendance: 1,307
Referee: Ian Tempest

20 April 2019
14:30

(1 BP) Doncaster Knights	33 – 41	Coventry (1 BP)
	Report

Castle Park
Attendance: 1,073
Referee: Neil Chivers

20 April 2019
14:30

(1 BP) Hartpury College	43 – 22	London Scottish (1 BP)

Gillman's Ground
Attendance: 1,291
Referee: Craig Maxwell-Keys

20 April 2019
15:00

(1 BP) Ealing Trailfinders	54 – 21	Bedford Blues
	Report

Trailfinders Sports Ground
Attendance: 1,636
Referee: Dean Richards

21 April 2019
14:30

Cornish Pirates	33 – 29	Yorkshire Carnegie (2 BP)
	Report

Mennaye Field
Attendance: 1,833
Referee: Matt Turvey

=== Round 22 ===
27 April 2019
14:30

Doncaster Knights	19 – 46	Cornish Pirates (1 BP)
	Report

Castle Park
Attendance: 1,065
Referee: Ian Tempest

27 April 2019
15:00

(1 BP) Bedford Blues	38 – 13	Nottingham
	Report

Goldington Road
Attendance: 2,872
Referee: Greg MacDonald

27 April 2019
15:00

Jersey Reds	23 – 36	Coventry (1 BP)
	Report

Stade Santander International
Attendance: 2,155
Referee: Matt Turvey

27 April 2019
15:00

(1 BP) London Irish	33 – 12	Ealing Trailfinders
	Report

Madejski Stadium
Attendance: 5,070
Referee: Christophe Ridley

27 April 2019
15:00

London Scottish	17 – 27	Richmond
	Report

Athletic Ground
Attendance: 2,158
Referee: Fergus Kirby

27 April 2019
15:00

Yorkshire Carnegie	22 – 21	Hartpury College (1 BP)
	Report

Emerald Headingley Stadium
Attendance: 960
Referee: Andrew Jackson

== Attendances ==
Club	Home Games	Total	Average	Highest	Lowest	% Capacity
Bedford Blues	11	27,800	2,527	2,872	1,988	51%
Cornish Pirates	11	20,190	1,835	2,963	1,448	46%
Coventry	11	25,381	2,307	2,943	1,999	58%
Doncaster Knights	11	12,761	1,160	2,006	868	23%
Ealing Trailfinders	11	11,399	1,036	2,205	685	32%
Hartpury College	11	10,752	977	1,531	637	49%
Jersey Reds	11	17,940	1,631	2,515	1,034	41%
London Irish	11	41,475	3,770	10,106	2,067	16%
London Scottish	11	15,106	1,373	2,321	1,022	31%
Nottingham	11	13,872	1,261	1,576	930	42%
Richmond	11	13,326	1,211	2,743	602	27%
Yorkshire Carnegie	11	16,059	1,460	1,726	960	7%

== Individual statistics ==
- Note that points scorers includes tries as well as conversions, penalties and drop goals. Appearance figures also include coming on as substitutes (unused substitutes not included).

=== Top points scorers ===
Rank	Player	Team	Appearances	Points
1	(Canada) Shane O'Leary	Nottingham		186
2	(England) Rob Kirby	Richmond		158
3	(England) Will Maisey	Coventry		134
4	(Ireland) Peter Lydon	Ealing Trailfinders		128
5	(England) Brett Herron	Jersey Reds		116
6	(England) Will Cargill	Cornish Pirates		115
7	(England) Rory Jennings	London Scottish		107
8	(Scotland) Dougie Flockhart	Doncaster Knights		103
9	(England) Stephen Myler	London Irish		97
10	(United States) Will Hooley	Bedford Blues		89
10	(England) Jake Sharp	Bedford Blues / Coventry		89

=== Top try scorers ===
Rank	Player	Team	Appearances	Tries
1	(England) Dean Adamson	Bedford Blues		16
2	(England) Ryan Hutler	Bedford Blues		14
2	(England) Rob Stevenson	London Scottish		14
3	(England) James Cordy-Redden	Ealing Trailfinders		12
3	(England) Charlie Ingall	London Scottish		12
3	(New Zealand) Dan Temm	Yorkshire Carnegie		12
4	(England) Miles Mantella	London Scottish		11
4	(England) Kyle Moyle	Cornish Pirates		11
4	(England) Robin Wedlake	Cornish Pirates		11
5	(England) Tom James	Doncaster Knights		10
5	(Wales) Luc Jones	Richmond		10
5	(Australia) Dave Porecki	London Irish		10
5	(South Africa) Rayn Smid	Ealing Trailfinders		10
5	(England) David Williams	Nottingham		10

== Season records ==
=== Team ===
Largest home win — 67 points

72 – 5 London Irish at home to Yorkshire Carnegie on 13 October 2018

Largest away win — 41 points

61 – 20 Ealing Trailfinders away to Coventry on 23 March 2019

Most points scored — 72 points

72 – 5 London Irish at home to Yorkshire Carnegie on 13 October 2018

Most tries in a match — 12

London Irish at home to Yorkshire Carnegie on 13 October 2018

Most conversions in a match — 8

Ealing Trailfinders away to Coventry on 23 March 2019

Most penalties in a match — 5 (2)

Nottingham at home to Doncaster Knights on 29 September 2018
Coventry away to Nottingham on 23 December 2018

Most drop goals in a match — 1 (5)

Hartpury College away to Doncaster Knights on 8 September 2018
Jersey Reds at home to Cornish Pirates on 13 October 2018
Nottingham away to Richmond on 20 October 2018
Nottingham at home to Ealing Trailfinders on 26 October 2018
Nottingham away to Coventry on 13 April 2019

=== Attendances ===
Highest — 10,106

London Irish at home to Doncaster Knights on 23 March 2019

Lowest — 602

Richmond at home to Hartpury College on 29 September 2018

Highest average attendance — 3,770

London Irish

Lowest average attendance — 977

Hartpury College

=== Player ===
Most points in a match — 24

(Scotland) Dougie Flockhart for Doncaster Knights at home to Richmond on 26 January 2019

Most tries in a match — 4

(England) Robin Wedlake for Cornish Pirates away to Hartpury College on 15 September 2018

Most conversions in a match — 8

(England) Craig Willis for Ealing Trailfinders away to Coventry on 23 March 2019

Most penalties in a match — 5

(Canada) Shane O'Leary for Nottingham at home to Doncaster Knights on 29 September 2018
(England) Will Maisey for Coventry away to Nottingham on 23 December 2018

Most drop goals in a match — 1 (5)

(England) Luke Cozens for Hartpury College away to Doncaster Knights on 8 September 2018
(England) Aaron Penberthy for Jersey Reds at home to Cornish Pirates on 13 October 2018
(Canada) Shane O'Leary for Nottingham away to Richmond on 20 October 2018
(Canada) Shane O'Leary for Nottingham at home to Ealing Trailfinders on 26 October 2018
(Canada) Shane O'Leary for Nottingham away to Coventry on 13 April 2019
