= 2021–22 RFU Championship Cup =

Annual rugby union Championship Cup

Tournament details
- Countries: England Jersey
- Tournament format(s): Knockout
- Date: 9 April – 21 May 2022

Tournament statistics
- Teams: 11

Final
- Champions: Ealing Trailfinders (2nd title)
- Runners-up: Coventry

The 2021–22 RFU Championship Cup was the third season of the annual rugby union Championship Cup competition for second tier, professional English clubs playing in the RFU Championship. The competition returned after a 14-month hiatus, following the cancellation of the previous year's tournament and the mid season cancellation of the 2019–20 tournament.

== Competition format ==
The competition format is two-legged knockout ties with a first round of five matches, followed by quarter-finals, semi-finals and final. The Championship winners, Ealing Trailfinders received a bye to the quarter-finals. The first round matches took place on 9 April, following the final round of Championship fixtures. In the competition's inaugural season, the RFU had set out the pool matches in a regional format to encourage derby games, but this year's competition format is more loosely structured.

== Participating teams and locations ==
Club	Stadium	Capacity	Area
Ampthill	Dillingham Park	3,000	Ampthill, Bedfordshire
Bedford Blues	Goldington Road	5,000 (1,700 seats)	Bedford, Bedfordshire
Cornish Pirates	Mennaye Field	4,000 (2,200 seats)	Penzance, Cornwall
Coventry	Butts Park Arena	4,000 (3,000 seats)	Coventry, West Midlands
Doncaster Knights	Castle Park	5,183 (1,650 seats)	Doncaster, South Yorkshire
Ealing Trailfinders	Trailfinders Sports Ground	4,000 (2,200 seats)	West Ealing, London
Hartpury University	ALPAS Arena	2,000	Hartpury, Gloucestershire
Jersey Reds	Stade Santander International	4,000	Saint Peter, Jersey
London Scottish	Athletic Ground	4,500 (1,000 seats)	Richmond, London
Nottingham	Lady Bay Sports Ground	3,500	Nottingham, Nottinghamshire
Richmond	Athletic Ground	4,500 (1,000 seats)	Richmond, London

Locations of the 2021–22 RFU Championship Cup teams
Greater London RFU Championship Cup teams

== First round ==
=== First leg ===
8 April 2022
19:30

Richmond	26 – 61	Hartpury University

Athletic Ground

8 April 2022
19:45

Nottingham	14 – 38	Bedford Blues

Lady Bay

9 April 2022
14:30

Doncaster Knights	24 – 26	Cornish Pirates

Castle Park

9 April 2022
15:00

Ampthill	27 – 21	Coventry

Dillingham Park

9 April 2022
17:00

Jersey Reds	57 – 14	London Scottish

Stade Santander International

=== Second leg ===
24 April 2022
14:00

London Scottish	7 – 54	Jersey Reds

Athletic Ground

- Jersey Reds win 111 – 21 on aggregate

24 April 2022
14:30

Cornish Pirates	20 – 32	Doncaster Knights

Mennaye Field

- Doncaster Knights win 56 – 46 on aggregate

24 April 2022
14:30

Hartpury University	35 – 40	Richmond

ALPAS Arena

- Hartpury University win 96 – 66 on aggregate

24 April 2022
15:00

Coventry	31 – 22	Ampthill

Butts Park Arena

- Coventry win 52 – 49 on aggregate

24 April 2022
15:00

Bedford Blues	52 – 19	Nottingham

Goldington Road

- Bedford Blues win 90 – 33 on aggregate

== Knock-out stage ==
The four overall winners from round 1 along with the best two losing teams and Ealing Trailfinders will contest the two-legged quarter-finals. The competition will then be played in a single-leg straight knockout format.

=== Quarter-finals ===
==== 1st leg ====
29 April
19:45

Hartpury University	19 – 19	Jersey Reds

ALPAS Arena

30 April
14:30

Cornish Pirates	38 – 37	Bedford Blues

Mennaye Field

30 April
14:30

Doncaster Knights	22 – 35	Coventry

Castle Park

30 April
15:00

Ampthill	21 – 31	Ealing Trailfinders

Dillingham Park

==== 2nd leg ====
6 May
19:45

Jersey Reds	30 – 14	Hartpury University

Stade Santander International

- Jersey Reds won 49 - 34 on aggregate

7 May
15:00

Bedford Blues	32 – 33	Cornish Pirates

Goldington Road

- Cornish Pirates won 71 – 69 on aggregate

7 May
15:00

Ealing Trailfinders	56 – 24	Ampthill

Trailfinders Sports Ground

- Ealing Trailfinders won 87 – 45 on aggregate

8 May
15:00

Coventry	27 – 31	Doncaster Knights

Butts Park Arena

- Coventry won 62 – 53 on aggregate

=== Semi-finals ===
13 May
19:00

Jersey Reds	17 – 20	Coventry

Stade Santander International

14 May
15:00

Ealing Trailfinders	36 – 26	Cornish Pirates

Trailfinders Sports Ground

=== Final ===
21 May

Ealing Trailfinders	19 – 13	Coventry

Trailfinders Sports Ground
Attendance: 1,400
Referee: Michael Hudson

== See also ==
- RFU Championship
- British and Irish Cup
