= 2022–23 RFU Championship =

Rugby union competition in England

- Countries: England; Jersey
- Date: 9 September 2022 — 29 April 2023
- Champions: Jersey Reds
- Runners-up: Ealing Trailfinders
- Relegated: Richmond
- Matches played: 132
- Attendance: 176,335 (average 1,336 per match)
- Highest attendance: 5,000 – Bedford Blues v Ampthill, 26 December 2022
- Lowest attendance: 407 – Ampthill v Doncaster Knights, 18 March 2023
- Tries scored: 1029 (average 7.8 per match)
- Top point scorer: 174 – William Maisey (Bedford Blues)
- Top try scorer: 15 – Sean French (Bedford Blues); Carlo Trizzano (Ealing Trailfinders)

The 2022–23 RFU Championship is the fourteenth season of the RFU Championship, the professional second tier of rugby union in England. It features eleven English teams and one from Jersey. Jersey Reds won the league with one match remaining.

== Structure ==
The twelve teams will play each of the other teams twice.

The results of the matches contribute points to the league as follows:

- 4 points are awarded for a win
- 2 points are awarded for a draw
- 0 points are awarded for a loss, however
- 1 losing (bonus) point is awarded to a team that loses a match by 7 points or fewer
- 1 additional (bonus) point is awarded to a team scoring 4 tries or more in a match.

=== Promotion and relegation ===
Subject to meeting the minimum standards criteria the team finishing top of the league will be promoted to Premiership Rugby, which means there will be no relegation to National League 1. If the champions do not meet the criteria, and therefore not promoted, one team will be relegated. With both Wasps and Worcester Warriors entering administration and deemed unable to compete in the Championship the competition will include 12 teams in 2023–24.

On 13 February 2023, the RFU confirmed that only Doncaster Knights were eligible for promotion.

== RFU funding ==
For the third year in a row, each club will receive approximately £161,500 in funding from the RFU, as part of the reduction of funding introduced ahead of the 2016–17 season. Following news of the funding change, several clubs announced a switch to a semi-professional business model ahead of the 2020–21 season.

== Teams ==
Locations of the 2022–23 RFU Championship teams
Greater London RFU Championship teams

Eleven of the twelve teams played in last season's competition. Having won the 2021–22 National League 1, Caldy were promoted to the Championship. Owing to there being only eleven teams in the Championship last season there was no relegation.

| Club | Stadium | Capacity | Area | Previous season |
|---|---|---|---|---|
| Ampthill | Dillingham Park | 3,000 | Ampthill, Bedfordshire | 6th |
| Bedford Blues | Goldington Road | 5,000 (1,700 seats) | Bedford, Bedfordshire | 5th |
| Caldy | Paton Field | 4,000 | Thurstaston, Wirral, Merseyside | Promoted from National League 1 |
| Cornish Pirates | Mennaye Field | 4,000 (2,200 seats) | Penzance, Cornwall | 3rd |
| Coventry | Butts Park Arena | 4,000 (3,000 seats) | Coventry, West Midlands | 8th |
| Doncaster Knights | Castle Park | 5,183 (1,926 seats) | Doncaster, South Yorkshire | 2nd |
| Ealing Trailfinders | Trailfinders Sports Ground | 5,000 (2,115 seats) | West Ealing, London | 1st |
| Hartpury University | ALPAS Arena | 2,000 | Hartpury, Gloucestershire | 7th |
| Jersey Reds | Stade Santander International | 4,000 | Saint Peter, Jersey | 4th |
| London Scottish | Athletic Ground | 4,500 (1,000 seats) | Richmond, London | 11th |
| Nottingham | Lady Bay Sports Ground | 3,500 | Nottingham, Nottinghamshire | 10th |
| Richmond | Athletic Ground | 4,500 (1,000 seats) | Richmond, London | 9th |

== Table ==
2022–23 RFU Championship Table
| Pos | Team | Pld | W | D | L | PF | PA | PD | TB | LB | Pts | Qualification |
|---|---|---|---|---|---|---|---|---|---|---|---|---|
| 1 | Jersey Reds (Note: There is no promotion this season) | 22 | 20 | 1 | 1 | 804 | 391 | +413 | 18 | 0 | 100 | Champions |
| 2 | Ealing Trailfinders | 22 | 19 | 0 | 3 | 915 | 359 | +556 | 19 | 3 | 98 | |
| 3 | Coventry | 22 | 17 | 1 | 4 | 733 | 523 | +210 | 18 | 1 | 89 | |
| 4 | Bedford Blues | 22 | 12 | 0 | 10 | 697 | 619 | +78 | 16 | 3 | 67 | |
| 5 | Cornish Pirates | 22 | 13 | 0 | 9 | 510 | 516 | −6 | 7 | 2 | 61 | |
| 6 | Doncaster Knights | 22 | 10 | 0 | 12 | 565 | 583 | −18 | 9 | 3 | 52 | |
| 7 | Hartpury | 22 | 10 | 0 | 12 | 504 | 571 | −67 | 7 | 3 | 50 | |
| 8 | Ampthill | 22 | 8 | 1 | 13 | 512 | 626 | −114 | 10 | 3 | 47 | |
| 9 | Nottingham | 22 | 7 | 0 | 15 | 548 | 655 | −107 | 12 | 3 | 43 | |
| 10 | Caldy | 22 | 7 | 0 | 15 | 452 | 721 | −269 | 8 | 3 | 39 | |
| 11 | London Scottish | 22 | 4 | 0 | 18 | 419 | 706 | −287 | 5 | 5 | 26 | |
| 12 | Richmond (R) | 22 | 3 | 1 | 18 | 373 | 762 | −389 | 5 | 4 | 23 | Relegated |

Updated to match(es) played on 29 April 2023. Source: "The Championship". England Rugby.
Rules for classification: If teams are level at any stage, tiebreakers are applied in the following order:
1. Number of matches won
2. Difference between points for and against
3. Total number of points for
4. Aggregate number of points scored in matches between tied teams
5. Number of matches won excluding the first match, then the second and so on until the tie is settled
  Notes:

== Fixtures & results ==
Fixtures for the season was announced by the RFU on 24 June 2022.

=== Round 1 ===
10 September 2022
15:00

| Ampthill | 21 – 36 | Jersey Reds (1 BP) |

Dillingham Park
Attendance: 671
Referee: Michael Hudson

10 September 2022
15:00

| (1 BP) Caldy | 22 – 33 | Hartpury University (1 BP) |

Paton Field
Attendance: 501
Referee: Nicholas David Wood

10 September 2022
15:00

| Cornish Pirates | 21 – 14 | Richmond (1 BP) |
| | Report |

Mennaye Field
Attendance: 1,374
Referee: Dan Jones

10 September 2022
15:00

| (1 BP) Coventry | 26 – 18 | Bedford Blues |
| | Report |

Butts Park Arena
Attendance: 2,114
Referee: Harry Walbaum

10 September 2022
15:00

| (1 BP) Ealing Trailfinders | 29 – 10 | Doncaster Knights |

Trailfinders Sports Ground
Attendance: 868
Referee: Karl Dickson

10 September 2022
15:00

| London Scottish | 10 – 31 | Nottingham (1 BP) |
| | Report |

Athletic Ground
Attendance: 482
Referee: Craig Maxwell-Keys

=== Round 2 ===
17 September 2022
14:30

| Hartpury University | 16 – 34 | Doncaster Knights (1 BP) |

ALPAS Arena
Attendance: 503
Referee: Simon Harding

17 September 2022
15:00

| Ampthill | 17 – 32 | Ealing Trailfinders (1 BP) |

Dillingham Park
Attendance: 565
Referee: Charlie Gayther

17 September 2022
15:00

| (1 BP) Bedford Blues | 49 – 36 | London Scottish (1 BP) |

Goldington Road
Attendance: 2,218
Referee: Mike Hudson

17 September 2022
15:00

| (1 BP) Jersey Reds | 40 – 14 | Coventry |

Stade Santander International
Attendance: 1,112
Referee: Jack Makepeace

17 September 2022
15:00

| (2 BP) Richmond | 32 – 34 | Caldy (1 BP) |

Athletic Ground
Attendance: 685
Referee: Neil Chivers

18 September 2022
15:00

| (1 BP) Nottingham | 19 – 23 | Cornish Pirates |

Lady Bay Sports Ground
Attendance: 1,057

=== Round 3 ===
24 September 2022
14:00

| London Scottish | 21 – 55 | Jersey Reds (1 BP) |

Athletic Ground
Attendance: 525
Referee: Simon Harding

24 September 2022
14:30

| Cornish Pirates | 21 – 41 | Bedford Blues (1 BP) |

Mennaye Field
Attendance: 1,491
Referee: Alex Thomas

24 September 2022
14:30

| (1 BP) Doncaster Knights | 48 – 24 | Richmond (1 BP) |

Castle Park
Attendance: 925
Referee: Mike Hudson

24 September 2022
15:00

| Caldy | 19 – 27 | Nottingham |

Paton Field
Attendance: 1,125
Referee: Harry Walbaum

24 September 2022
15:00

| (1 BP) Coventry | 26 – 24 | Ampthill (2 BP) |

Butts Park Arena
Attendance: 1,708
Referee: George Selwood

24 September 2022
15:00

| (1 BP) Ealing Trailfinders | 42 – 7 | Hartpury University |

Trailfinders Sports Ground
Attendance: 620
Referee: Neil Chivers

=== Round 4 ===
30 September 2022
19:15

| Jersey Reds | 21 – 10 | Cornish Pirates |

Stade Santander International
Attendance: 1,385
Referee: Harry Walbaum

30 September 2022
19:15

| (1 BP) Nottingham | 30 – 15 | Doncaster Knights |

Lady Bay Sports Ground
Attendance: 1,130
Referee: George Selwood

1 October 2022
15:00

| (1 BP) Ampthill | 59 – 7 | London Scottish |

Dillingham Park
Attendance: 743
Referee: Hamish Grant

1 October 2022
15:00

| (1 BP) Bedford Blues | 52 – 29 | Caldy (1 BP) |

Goldington Road
Attendance: 2,584
Referee: Simon Harding

1 October 2022
15:00

| Coventry | 5 – 50 | Ealing Trailfinders (1 BP) |

Butts Park Arena
Attendance: 2,037
Referee: Andrew Jackson

1 October 2022
15:00

| Richmond | 19 – 15 | Hartpury University (1 BP) |

Athletic Ground
Attendance: 475
Referee: Alex Thomas

=== Round 5 ===
8 October 2022
14:30

| (1 BP) Doncaster Knights | 50 – 19 | Bedford Blues |

Castle Park
Attendance: 1,170
Referee: Hamish Smales

8 October 2022
14:30

| (1 BP) Hartpury University | 39 – 31 | Nottingham (1 BP) |

ALPAS Arena
Attendance: 975
Referee: Dan Jones

8 October 2022
15:00

| Caldy | 19 – 34 | Jersey Reds (1 BP) |

Paton Field
Attendance: 1,895
Referee: Charles Gayther

8 October 2022
15:00

| (1 BP) Ealing Trailfinders | 56 – 19 | Richmond |

Trailfinders Sports Ground
Attendance: 1,134
Referee: Craig Maxwell-Keys

8 October 2022
15:00

| (1 BP) London Scottish | 32 – 46 | Coventry (1 BP) |

Athletic Ground
Attendance: 824
Referee: Neil Chivers

9 October 2022
14:30

| Cornish Pirates | 15 – 13 | Ampthill (1 BP) |

Mennaye Field
Attendance: 1,352
Referee: Anthony Woodthorpe

=== Round 6 ===
21 October 2022
19:15

| Jersey Reds | 19 – 17 | Doncaster Knights (1 BP) |

Stade Santander International
Attendance: 1,237
Referee: George Selwood

21 October 2022
19:45

| (1 BP) Nottingham | 45 – 26 | Richmond (1 BP) |

Lady Bay Sports Ground
Attendance: 880
Referee: Harry Walbaum

22 October 2022
14:00

| (1 BP) Ampthill | 26 – 24 | Caldy (2 BP) |

Dillingham Park
Attendance: 683
Referee: Hamish Smales

22 October 2022
15:00

| (1 BP) Bedford Blues | 28 – 21 | Hartpury University (1 BP) |

Goldington Road
Attendance: 2,429
Referee: Mike Hudson

22 October 2022
15:00

| (1 BP) Coventry | 32 – 19 | Cornish Pirates |

Butts Park Arena
Attendance: 2,552
Referee: Adam Wookey

22 October 2022
15:00

| London Scottish | 21 – 57 | Ealing Trailfinders (1 BP) |

Athletic Ground
Attendance: 674
Referee: Luke Rogan

=== Round 7 ===
29 October 2022
13:30

| Hartpury University | 17 – 27 | Jersey Reds (1 BP) |

ALPAS Arena
Attendance: 1,035
Referee: Simon Harding

29 October 2022
14:30

| (1 BP) Cornish Pirates | 32 – 0 | London Scottish |

Mennaye Field
Attendance: 1,564
Referee: George Selwood

29 October 2022
14:30

| (1 BP) Doncaster Knights | 35 – 19 | Ampthill |

Castle Park
Attendance: 889
Referee: Joe James

29 October 2022
15:00

| Caldy | 18 – 27 | Coventry (1 BP) |

Paton Field
Attendance: 1,100
Referee: Michael Hudson

29 October 2022
15:00

| (1 BP) Ealing Trailfinders | 64 – 33 | Nottingham (1 BP) |

Trailfinders Sports Ground
Attendance: 1,228
Referee: Nick Wood

29 October 2022
15:00

| (1 BP) Richmond | 36 – 33 | Bedford Blues (2 BP) |

Athletic Ground
Attendance: 1,324
Referee: Charles Gayther

=== Round 8 ===
3 December 2022
13:30

| Ampthill | 12 – 20 | Hartpury |

Dillingham Park
Attendance: 650
Referee: Ian Tempest

3 December 2022
14:30

| Cornish Pirates | 12 – 25 | Ealing Trailfinders (1 BP) |

Mennaye Field
Attendance: 1,589
Referee: Charles Gayther

3 December 2022
15:00

| (1 BP) Bedford Blues | 32 – 31 | Nottingham (2 BP) |

Goldington Road
Attendance: 2,491
Referee: Neil Chivers

3 December 2022
15:00

| (1 BP) Coventry | 47 – 7 | Doncaster Knights |

Butts Park Arena
Attendance: 2,238
Referee: Jack Makepiece

3 December 2022
15:00

| (1 BP) Jersey Reds | 34 – 19 | Richmond |

Stade Santander International
Attendance: 1,074
Referee: Harry Walbaum

3 December 2022
15:00

| London Scottish | 19 – 10 | Caldy |

Athletic Ground
Attendance: 601
Referee: Joe James

=== Round 9 ===
9 December 2022
19:45

| Nottingham | 22 – 31 | Jersey Reds (1 BP) |

Lady Bay Sports Ground
Attendance: 1,100
Referee: Hamish Smales

10 December 2022
14:00

| Caldy | 15 – 14 | Cornish Pirates (1 BP) |

Paton Field
Attendance: 721
Referee: Hamish Grant

10 December 2022
14:30

| Doncaster Knights | 15 – 14 | London Scottish (1 BP) |

Castle Park
Attendance: 922
Referee: Adam Wookey

10 December 2022
14:30

| (1 BP) Hartpury | 45 – 36 | Coventry (1 BP) |

ALPAS Arena
Attendance: 760
Referee: Charlie Gayther

10 December 2022
15:00

| (1 BP) Ealing Trailfinders | 42 – 17 | Bedford Blues |

Trailfinders Sports Ground
Attendance: 910
Referee: Joe James

10 December 2022
15:00

| Richmond | 21 – 21 | Ampthill |

Athletic Ground
Attendance: 757
Referee: Simon Harding

=== Round 10 ===
17 December 2022

| Ampthill | P – P | Nottingham |

Dillingham Park

17 December 2022

| Caldy | P – P | Ealing Trailfinders |

Paton Field

17 December 2022

| (1 BP) Jersey Reds | 45 – 5 | Bedford Blues |

Stade Santander International
Attendance: 1,090
Referee: Mike Hudson

17 December 2022

| (1 BP) Coventry | 48 – 12 | Richmond |

Butts Park Arena
Attendance: 2,772
Referee: Joe James

17 December 2022

| London Scottish | P – P | Hartpury |

Athletic Ground

18 December 2022

| Cornish Pirates | P – P | Doncaster Knights |

Mennaye Field

=== Round 11 ===
23 December 2022
19:45

| Hartpury | 22 – 16 | Cornish Pirates (1 BP) |

ALPAS Arena
Attendance: 960
Referee: Alex Thomas

24 December 2022
12:00

| (1 BP) Ealing Trailfinders | 43 – 22 | Jersey Reds (1 BP) |

Trailfinders Sports Ground
Attendance: 1,471
Referee: Luke Pearce

26 December 2022
14:30

| (1 BP) Doncaster Knights | 52 – 14 | Caldy |

Castle Park
Attendance: 1,125
Referee: Sara Cox

26 December 2022
15:00

| (1 BP) Bedford Blues | 38 – 14 | Ampthill |

Goldington Road
Attendance: 5,000
Referee: Jack Makepeace

26 December 2022
15:00

| Nottingham | 17 – 45 | Coventry (1 BP) |

Lady Bay Sports Ground
Attendance: 1,411
Referee: Hamish Smales

31 December 2022
14:30

| Richmond | 22 – 8 | London Scottish |

Athletic Ground
Attendance: 1,898
Referee: Nicholas Wood

=== Rescheduled matches (Round 10) ===
7 January 2023
14:00

| (1 BP) Caldy | 26 – 24 | Ealing Trailfinders (1 BP) |

Paton Field
Attendance: 1,150
Referee: Ian Tempest

7 January 2023
14:30

| (1 BP) Cornish Pirates | 37 – 15 | Doncaster Knights |

Mennaye Field
Attendance: 1,377
Referee: George Selwood

7 January 2023
14:30

| (1 BP) London Scottish | 19 – 20 | Hartpury |

Athletic Ground
Attendance: 430
Referee: Anthony Woodthorpe

=== Round 12 ===
13 January 2023
19:30

| Cornish Pirates | 17 – 6 | Nottingham |

Mennaye Field
Attendance: 1,460
Referee: Harry Walbaum

14 January 2023
14:00

| Caldy | 27 – 7 | Richmond |

Paton Field
Attendance: 1,298
Referee: Mike Hudson

14 January 2023
14:30

| Doncaster Knights | 10 – 25 | Hartpury |

Castle Park
Attendance: 948
Referee: Jonathan Cook

14 January 2023
15:00

| Coventry | 19 – 19 | Jersey Reds |

Butts Park Arena
Attendance: 3,183
Referee: Nick Wood

14 January 2023
15:00

| (1 BP) Ealing Trailfinders | 35 – 24 | Ampthill (1 BP) |

Trailfinders Sports Ground
Attendance: 781
Referee: Andrew Jackson

14 January 2023
15:00

| London Scottish | 13 – 34 | Bedford Blues (1 BP) |

Athletic Ground
Attendance: 700
Referee: Joe James

=== Round 13 ===
20 January 2023
19:45

| Nottingham | 17 – 29 | Caldy (1 BP) |

Lady Bay Sports Ground
Attendance: 1,237
Referee: Jonathan Cook

21 January 2023
14:00

| Ampthill | P – P | Coventry |

Dillingham Park

21 January 2023
14:30

| Hartpury | 13 – 26 | Ealing Trailfinders (1 BP) |

ALPAS Arena
Attendance: 980
Referee: Nick Wood

21 January 2023
15:00

| (1 BP) Bedford Blues | 55 – 13 | Cornish Pirates |

Goldington Road
Attendance: 3,267
Referee: Alex Thomas

21 January 2023
15:00

| (1 BP) Jersey Reds | 24 – 22 | London Scottish (2 BP) |

Stade Santander International
Attendance: 1,275
Referee: Sara Cox

21 January 2023
15:00

| Richmond | 17 – 27 | Doncaster Knights |

Athletic Ground
Attendance: 897
Referee: Joe James

=== Round 14 ===
28 January 2023
14:00

| (1 BP) Caldy | 36 – 28 | Bedford Blues (1 BP) |

Paton Field
Attendance: 1,875
Referee: Hamish Smales

28 January 2023
14:30

| Cornish Pirates | 25 – 34 | Jersey Reds (1 BP) |

Mennaye Field
Attendance: 1,683
Referee: Dan Jones

28 January 2023
14:30

| (1 BP) Doncaster Knights | 32 – 17 | Nottingham |

Castle Park
Attendance: 1,238
Referee: Ian Tempest

28 January 2023
14:30

| (1 BP) Hartpury | 26 – 14 | Richmond |

ALPAS Arena
Attendance: 376
Referee: Mike Hudson

28 January 2023
15:00

| (1 BP) Ealing Trailfinders | 19 – 22 | Coventry |

Trailfinders Sports Ground
Attendance: 987
Referee: Sara Cox

28 January 2023
15:00

| London Scottish | 19 – 28 | Ampthill (1 BP) |

Athletic Ground
Attendance: 414
Referee: George Selwood

=== Rescheduled matches (Round 10) ===
25 February 2023
14:00

| (1 BP) Ampthill | 36–24 | Nottingham (1 BP) |

Dillingham Park
Attendance: 509
Referee: Harry Walbaum

=== Round 15 ===
3 March 2023
19:45

| (1 BP) Bedford Blues | 48 – 25 | Doncaster Knights |

Goldington Road
Attendance: 2,585
Referee: Michael Hudson

3 March 2023
15:00

| (1 BP) Nottingham | 31 – 45 | Hartpury (1 BP) |

Lady Bay Sports Ground
Attendance: 952
Referee: Hamish Grant

4 March 2023
14:00

| Ampthill | 22 – 61 | Cornish Pirates (1 BP) |

Dillingham Park
Attendance: 589
Referee: Nick Wood

4 March 2023
14:00

| Richmond | 0 – 50 | Ealing Trailfinders (1 BP) |

Athletic Ground
Attendance: 723
Referee: Joe James

4 March 2023
15:00

| (1 BP) Coventry | 31 – 13 | London Scottish |

Butts Park Arena
Attendance: 2,745
Referee: Anthony Woodthorpe

4 March 2023
15:00

| (1 BP) Jersey Reds | 71 – 14 | Caldy |

Stade Santander International
Attendance: 1,271
Referee: Jack Makepeace

=== Round 16 ===
10 March 2023
19:45

| Hartpury | 14 – 35 | Bedford Blues (1 BP) |

ALPAS Arena
Attendance: 850
Referee: Sara Cox

11 March 2023
13:30

| (1 BP) Cornish Pirates | 31 – 26 | Coventry (2 BP) |

Mennaye Field
Attendance: 1,718
Referee: Mike Hudson

11 March 2023
14:00

| Richmond | 17 – 28 | Nottingham (1 BP) |

Athletic Ground
Attendance: 445
Referee: Neil Chivers

11 March 2023
14:30

| Doncaster Knights | P – P | Jersey Reds |

Castle Park

11 March 2023
15:00

| (1 BP) Caldy | 16 – 17 | Ampthill |

Paton Field
Attendance: 657
Referee: Hamish Grant

11 March 2023
15:00

| (1 BP) Ealing Trailfinders | 66 – 0 | London Scottish |

Trailfinders Sports Ground
Attendance: 898
Referee: Alex Thomas

=== Round 17 ===
17 March 2023
19:45

| (1 BP) Bedford Blues | 39 – 5 | Richmond |

Goldington Road
Attendance: 2,543
Referee: Hamish Smales

18 March 2023
14:00

| (1 BP) Coventry | 48 – 19 | Caldy |

Butts Park Arena
Attendance: 2,407
Referee: Joe James

18 March 2023
14:00

| (1 BP) Jersey Reds | 36 – 22 | Hartpury |

Stade Santander International
Attendance: 1,068
Referee: Hamish Grant

18 March 2023
14:00

| Nottingham | 21 – 41 | Ealing Trailfinders (1 BP) |

Lady Bay Sports Ground
Attendance: 1,082
Referee: Jack Makepeace

18 March 2023
15:00

| (1 BP) Ampthill | 31 – 12 | Doncaster Knights |

Dillingham Park
Attendance: 407
Referee: Henry Walbaum

18 March 2023
15:00

| (2 BP) London Scottish | 31 – 34 | Cornish Pirates (1 BP) |

Athletic Ground
Attendance: 467
Referee: Sara Cox

=== Round 18 ===
24 March 2023
19:45

| (2 BP) Hartpury | 26 – 32 | Ampthill (1 BP) |

ALPAS Arena
Attendance: 1,030
Referee: Tom Foley

25 March 2023
14:00

| Richmond | 0 – 64 | Jersey Reds (1 BP) |

Athletic Ground
Attendance: 1,153
Referee: Charlie Gayther

25 March 2023
14:30

| (2 BP) Doncaster Knights | 39 – 45 | Coventry (1 BP) |

Castle Park
Attendance: 865
Referee: Sarah Cox

25 March 2023
15:00

| Caldy | 26 – 19 | London Scottish (1 BP) |

Paton Field
Attendance: 1,895
Referee: Alexander Thomas

25 March 2023
15:00

| (1 BP) Ealing Trailfinders | 50 – 12 | Cornish Pirates |

Trailfinders Sports Ground
Attendance: 1,005
Referee: Mike Hudson

26 March 2023
15:00

| (1 BP) Nottingham | 26 – 24 | Bedford Blues (2 BP) |

Lady Bay Sports Ground
Attendance: 871
Referee: Harry Walbaum

=== Round 19 ===
31 March 2023
19:45

| (1 BP) Coventry | 42 – 19 | Hartpury |

Butts Park Arena
Attendance: 2,009
Referee: Alex Thomas

1 April 2023
15:00

| (1 BP) Ampthill | 33 – 19 | Richmond |

Dillingham Park
Attendance: 547
Referee: Hamish Grant

1 April 2023
15:00

| (1 BP) Bedford Blues | 31 – 40 | Ealing Trailfinders (1 BP) |

Goldington Road
Attendance: 2,504
Referee: Simon Harding

1 April 2023
15:00

| (1 BP) Jersey Reds | 52 – 10 | Nottingham |

Stade Santander International
Attendance: 1,242
Referee: Joe James

1 April 2023
15:00

| London Scottish | 24 – 33 | Doncaster Knights (1 BP) |

Athletic Ground
Attendance: 603
Referee: Mike Hudson

2 April 2023
14:30

| (1 BP) Cornish Pirates | 28 – 21 | Caldy (1 BP) |

Mennaye Field
Attendance: 1,510
Referee: Harry Welbaum

=== Rescheduled matches ===
8 April 2023
13:00

| Doncaster Knights | 24 – 52 | Jersey Reds (1 BP) |

Castle Park
Attendance: 1,007
Referee: Harry Walbaum

8 April 2023
14:00

| Ampthill | 21 – 45 | Coventry (1 BP) |

Dillingham Park
Attendance: 896
Referee: George Selwood

=== Round 20 ===
14 April 2023
19:45

| Hartpury | 12 – 22 | London Scottish |

ALPAS Arena
Attendance: 258
Referee: Craig Maxwell-Keys

14 April 2023
19:45

| (1 BP) Nottingham | 39 – 0 | Ampthill |

Lady Bay Sports Ground
Attendance: 910
Referee: Hamish Smales

15 April 2023
14:30

| (1 BP) Doncaster Knights | 13 – 14 | Cornish Pirates |

Castle Park
Attendance: 872
Referee: Joe James

15 April 2023
15:00

| (1 BP) Bedford Blues | 19 – 26 | Jersey Reds (1 BP) |

Goldington Road
Attendance: 2,510
Referee: Dan Jones

15 April 2023
15:00

| (1 BP) Ealing Trailfinders | 73 – 14 | Caldy |

Trailfinders Sports Ground
Attendance: 1,031
Referee: George Selwood

15 April 2023
15:00

| (1 BP) Richmond | 18 – 22 | Coventry |

Athletic Ground
Attendance: 990
Referee: Harry Walbaum

=== Round 21 ===
22 April 2023
14:00

| Jersey Reds | 19 – 13 | Ealing Trailfinders (1 BP) |

Stade Santander International
Attendance: 3,032
Referee: Christophe Ridey

22 April 2023
14:30

| Cornish Pirates | 21 – 12 | Hartpury |

Mennaye Field
Attendance: 1,481
Referee: Harry Walbaum

22 April 2023
15:00

| (2 BP) Ampthill | 27 – 33 | Bedford Blues (1 BP) |

Dillingham Park
Attendance: 2,600
Referee: Charlie Gayther

22 April 2023
15:00

| Caldy | 7 – 38 | Doncaster Knights (1 BP) |

Paton Field
Attendance: 1,950
Referee: Dan Jones

22 April 2023
15:00

| (1 BP) Coventry | 38 – 24 | Nottingham (1 BP) |

Butts Park Arena
Attendance: 3,721
Referee: George Selwood

22 April 2023
15:00

| (1 BP) London Scottish | 49 – 3 | Richmond |

Athletic Ground
Attendance: 1,622
Referee: Mike Hudson

=== Round 22 ===
28 April 2023
19:45

| (1 BP) Nottingham | 19 – 20 | London Scottish |

Lady Bay Sports Ground
Attendance: 1,782
Referee: Henry Walbaum

29 April 2023
14:30

| Doncaster Knights | 14 – 35 | Ealing Trailfinders (1 BP) |

Castle Park
Attendance: 1,723
Referee: Andrew Jackson

29 April 2023
15:00

| Bedford Blues | 19 – 43 | Coventry (1 BP) |

Goldington Road
Attendance: 3,256
Referee: Hamish Grant

29 April 2023
15:00

| (1 BP) Hartpury | 35 – 13 | Caldy |

ALPAS Arena
Attendance: 1,209
Referee: Nick Wood

29 April 2023
15:00

| (1 BP) Jersey Reds | 43 – 15 | Ampthill |

Stade Santander International
Attendance: 2,767
Referee: Mike Hudson

29 April 2023
15:00

| (2 BP) Richmond | 29 – 34 | Cornish Pirates (1 BP) |

Athletic Ground
Attendance: 1,042
Referee: Dan Jones

== Attendances ==
| Club | Home Games | Total | Average | Highest | Lowest | % Capacity |
|---|---|---|---|---|---|---|
| Ampthill | 11 | 8,860 | 805 | 2,600 | 407 | 27% |
| Bedford Blues | 11 | 31,387 | 2,853 | 5,000 | 2,218 | 57% |
| Caldy | 11 | 14,167 | 1,288 | 1,950 | 501 | 32% |
| Cornish Pirates | 11 | 16,599 | 1,509 | 1,718 | 1,352 | 38% |
| Coventry | 11 | 27,486 | 2,499 | 3,721 | 1,708 | 62% |
| Doncaster Knights | 11 | 11,684 | 1,062 | 1,723 | 865 | 20% |
| Ealing Trailfinders | 11 | 10,933 | 994 | 1,471 | 620 | 20% |
| Hartpury | 11 | 8,936 | 812 | 1,209 | 258 | 41% |
| Jersey Reds | 11 | 16,553 | 1,505 | 3,032 | 1,068 | 38% |
| London Scottish | 11 | 7,342 | 667 | 1,622 | 414 | 15% |
| Nottingham | 11 | 12,412 | 1,128 | 1,782 | 871 | 32% |
| Richmond | 11 | 10,389 | 944 | 1,898 | 445 | 21% |

== Leading scorers ==
Note: Flags to the left of player names indicate national team as has been defined under World Rugby eligibility rules, or primary nationality for players who have not yet earned international senior caps. Players may hold one or more non-WR nationalities.

=== Most points ===
As of 29 April 2023

| Rank | Player | Club | Points |
|---|---|---|---|
| 1 | (England) William Maisey | Bedford Blues | 174 |
| 2 | (England) Craig Willis | Ealing Trailfinders | 146 |
| 3 | (England) Russell Bennett | Jersey Reds | 143 |
| 4 | (Australia) Patrick Pellegrini | Coventry | 122 |
| 5 | (England) Alex Dolly | Doncaster Knights | 110 |

=== Most tries ===
As of 29 April 2023

| Rank | Player | Club | Tries |
|---|---|---|---|
| 1 | (Ireland) Sean French | Bedford Blues | 15 |
| 1 | (Australia) Carlo Tizzano | Ealing Trailfinders | 15 |
| 2 | (Scotland) Will Brown | Jersey Reds | 14 |
| 3 | (Ireland) Eoghan Clarke | Jersey Reds | 13 |
| 4 | (Wales) Tomi Lewis | Jersey Reds | 12 |

== See also ==
- 2022–23 Premiership Rugby
- 2022–23 RFU Championship Cup
