= Rugby union in England =

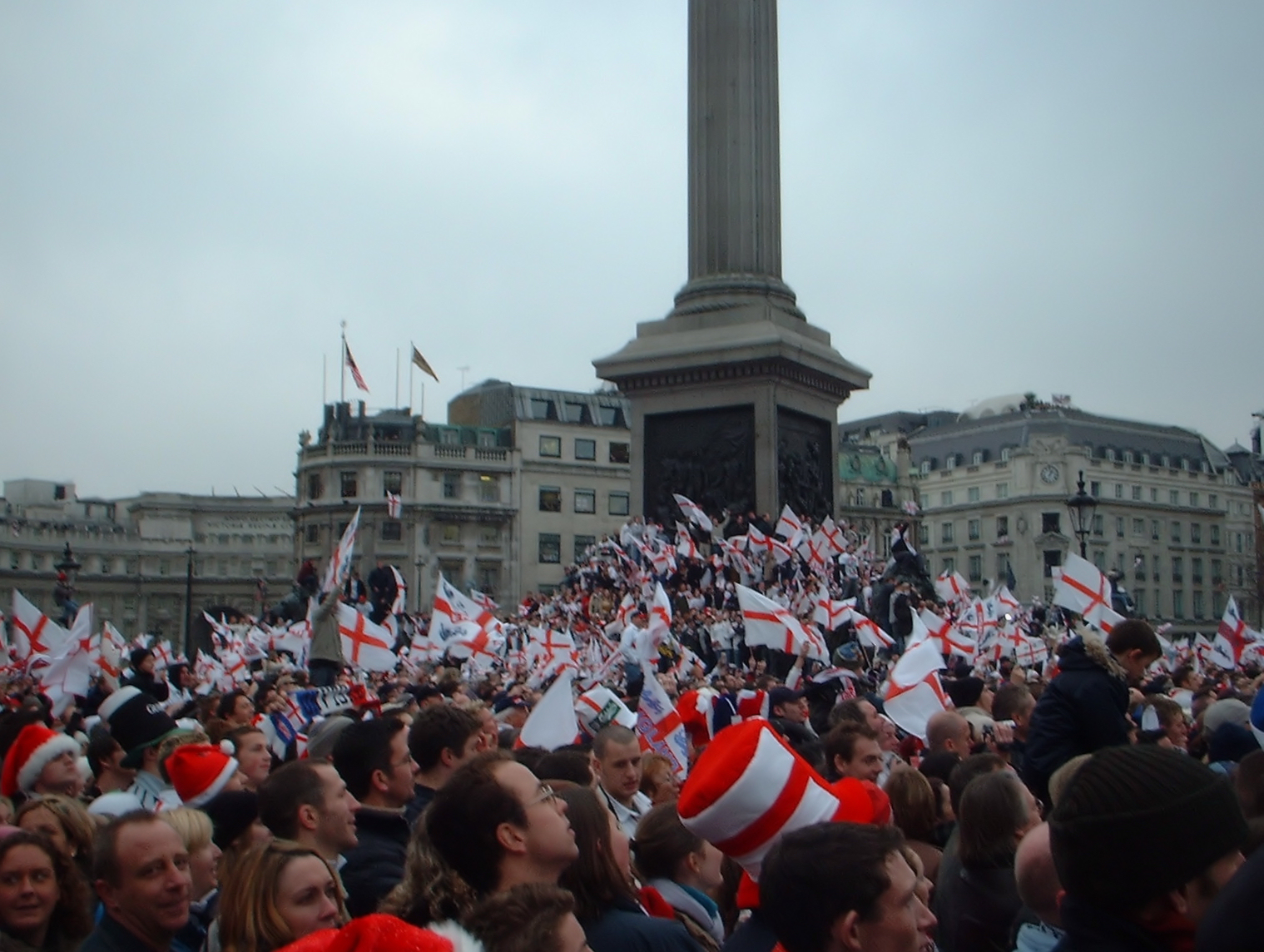
- Celebrations in Trafalgar Square after England won the 2003 Rugby World Cup.
- Country: England
- Governing body: Rugby Football Union
- National team: England
- First played: 1823, Rugby
- Registered players: 340,347
- Clubs: 2,099

National competitions
- World Cup; Six Nations; World Cup 7s; World Rugby 7s; London 7s; Women's World Cup; Women's Six Nations; Women's 7s Series

Club competitions
- European Champions Cup; European Challenge Cup; Premiership; Premiership Cup; Middlesex 7s; RFU Championship; RFU Championship Cup; Premier 15s (women)

Rugby union in England is one of the leading professional and recreational team sports. In 1871 the Rugby Football Union, the governing body for rugby union in England, was formed by 21 rugby clubs, and the first international match, which involved England, was played in Scotland. The England national team compete annually in the Six Nations Championship, and are former world champions after winning the 2003 Rugby World Cup. England's Red Roses won the 2025 Women's Rugby World Cup. The top domestic men's club competition is Premiership Rugby, and English clubs also compete in international competitions such as the European Rugby Champions Cup. The top domestic women's competition is the Premier 15s.

== History ==
=== Rugby School and foundation of early clubs ===
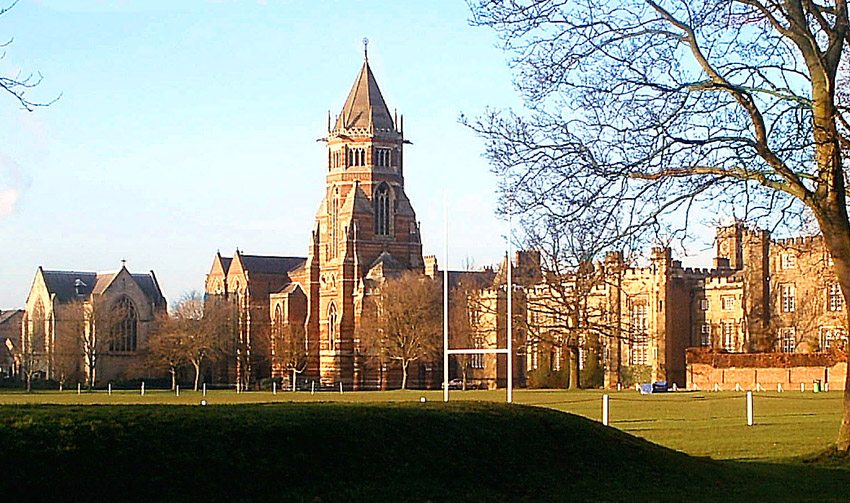
Rugby School

Rugby in England is generally attributed to when William Webb Ellis "who with a fine disregard for the rules as played in his time, first took the ball in his arms and ran with it" in 1823 at the Rugby School, although modern scholars consider this story to be a myth. One of the earliest football clubs formed, some claim it to actually be the first, is the Guy's Hospital Football Club which was founded in 1843 in Guy's Hospital, Southwark, London. The club played an early version of rugby football and was formed by old boys of the Rugby School. Subsequent clubs established in this period include Dublin University Football Club in 1854 and the Blackheath Rugby Club in 1858.

=== The forming of the RFU ===
The Football Association was formed at the Freemasons' Tavern, Great Queen Street, on Lincoln's Inn Fields, London on 26 October 1863, with the intention to include the most acceptable points of play under the one heading of football. However, disagreements over what was being excluded led the Blackheath Club to withdraw from the association which was followed by a number of other clubs. In 1870, Richmond F.C. published an invitation in the newspapers which read "Those who play the rugby-type game should meet to form a code of practice as various clubs play to rules which differ from others, which makes the game difficult to play". In January of the following year, 21 clubs meet at the Pall Mall Restaurant and the Rugby Football Union (RFU) was founded.

=== First international and the schism in rugby ===
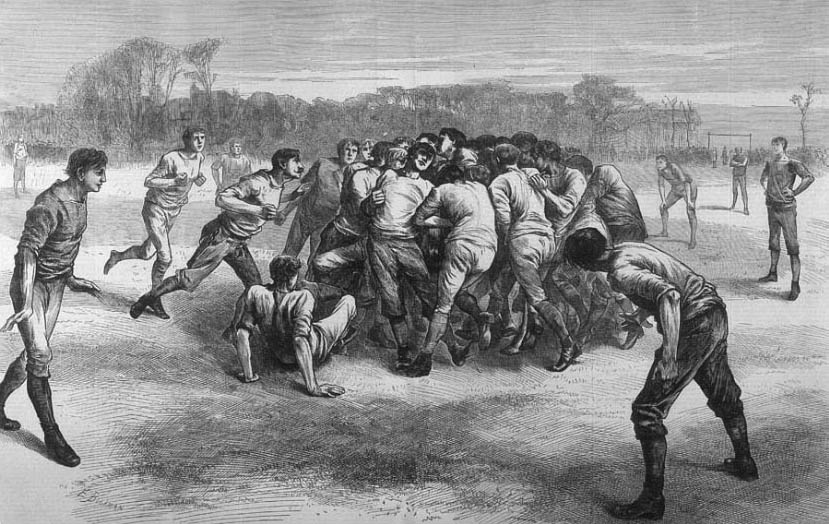
The Last Scrimmage by Edwin Buckman depicting a rugby scrum, as published on The Illustrated London News in 1871

On 27 March 1871 the first ever international match took place, involving England and Scotland. The Scottish side won the match, which was played at Raeburn Place in Edinburgh. In 1884, England opted not to join the International Rugby Football Board which was formed by Ireland, Scotland and Wales, as they thought they should have greater representation on the board as they have the larger number of clubs.

By the late 19th century, the issue over broken time in rugby had become important, particularly in the North of England, where a larger working class played rugby compared to the south, thus their work and injuries they received whilst playing came into conflict with the rules of amateurism. With mounting pressure regarding player payments and veiled professionalism, on 29 August 1895 at a meeting at the George Hotel, Huddersfield, 21 clubs met to form the Northern Rugby Football Union and thus resigned from the RFU. The game of rugby league was formed from the disaffected clubs.

During this period, rugby was played between counties similar to the system of first-class cricket in England now. In 1907, Cornwall won the county tournament and went on to represent Britain at Rugby union at the 1908 Summer Olympics.

=== Twickenham and centenary celebrations ===
The 1910 opening of the RFU's new home at Twickenham heralded a golden era for English rugby union. During the First World War, the Four Nations Championship became suspended in 1915 and it was not resumed until 1920. One hundred and thirty three international players were killed during the conflict. In 1923, a century of rugby was celebrated at the Rugby School, which saw an England and Wales XV play a Scottish-Irish team.

=== World War II ===
For duration of World War II the ban on rugby league players was temporarily lifted by the RFU. Many played in the eight rugby "Internationals" between England and Scotland which were played by Armed Services teams. The authorities also allowed the playing of two "Rugby League vs. Rugby Union" fixtures as fundraisers for the war effort (both matches were won by the rugby league teams playing rugby union). In 1958, long after the William Webb Ellis had become engraved as a legend in the history of rugby union, his grave was finally located by Ross McWhirter in the French town of Menton near the border with Monaco.

=== Formation of leagues ===
The RFU had long resisted leagues competitions, as it was thought that they would encourage player payments, thus most club matches were only organised friendlies, with competitions such as the County Cups and County Championship existing also. In 1972 the RFU sanctioned a knock-out competition, which was revamped in 2005 into a competition for top-tier English and Welsh sides now known as the LV= Cup. The league evolved over time since starting in 1987 when the Courage Leagues were formed, a league pyramid that had more than 1000 clubs playing in 108 leagues; each with promotion and relegation.

=== Professionalism ===
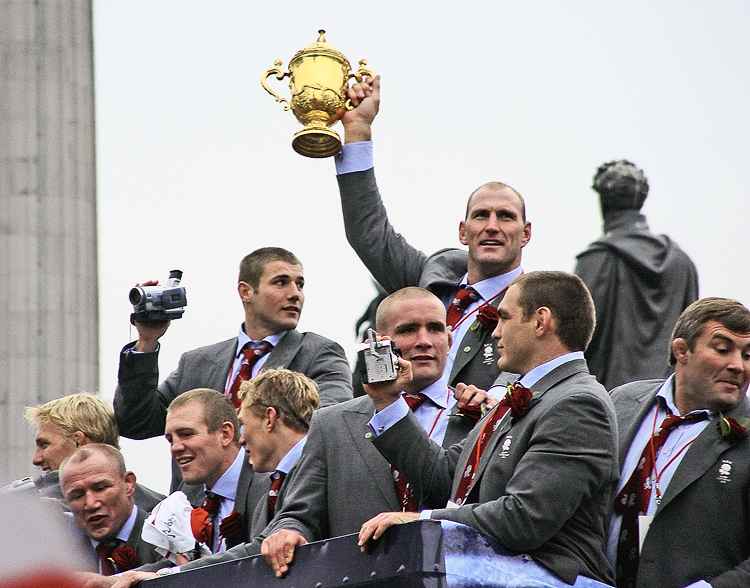
England celebrating their World Cup win in 2003

The Heineken Cup was formed in 1995 as a competition for twelve European clubs and ran through to the 2013–14 season, after which it was replaced by the European Rugby Champions Cup. Both competitions involve sides from England, France, Wales, Ireland, Scotland and Italy. The century-old competition for the European rugby powers became the Six Nations Championship in 2000 with the addition of Italy.

In November 2008 a proposal was made and adopted by the RFU to create a fully professional second tier of club rugby, to be called the Championship. It replaced National Division One starting with the 2009–10 season.

== Governing body ==
The Rugby Football Union are the governing body for rugby union in England.

== Competitions ==
=== Premiership ===
The 11-team Premiership is the top level of competition; it is fully professional, but has a salary cap in place. The RFU Championship (formerly National Division One) and National League 1 (formerly National Division Two) are the next levels down. The Championship became fully professional in 2009–10 but many teams have since returned to semi-professional; League 1 is semi-professional. Below this there are many regional leagues. Attendances at club rugby in England have risen strongly since the sport went professional. Some clubs have good all seater grounds in the 10,001–25,000 capacity range; some have older grounds which are still partly terraced, and others play in council-owned joint-use stadia. Some clubs rent stadia from football clubs.

=== Heineken Cup and European Rugby Champions Cup ===
From 1995 through to 2014, the top-level European club competition was the Heineken Cup, contested by the best teams from the Six Nations countries of England, France, Ireland, Italy, Scotland and Wales. Through its history, it was viewed by some as the top prize in European rugby for club teams. In April 2014, after two years of negotiations, it was confirmed that the Heineken Cup would be replaced by the new European Rugby Champions Cup beginning in the 2014–15 season. The Champions Cup includes the top eight teams from the previous season's Premiership.

=== Anglo-Welsh Cup and Premiership Rugby Cup ===
The Anglo-Welsh Cup, known by several sponsored names during its history, was the successor to a tournament founded in the 1971–72 season as the RFU Club Competition. It was originally a national knock-out competition for English club teams, and went through several sponsored names in the next quarter-century. Starting in the 2005–06 season, it was changed into a competition for Premiership clubs plus the Welsh sides competing in the Celtic League, now Pro14. The EDF National Trophy was founded in 2005–06 as a new knock-out competition solely for English clubs, but Premiership sides do not take part. Through the 2013–14 season, the strongest Premiership teams took part in the Heineken Cup and the rest of the Premiership competed in the Amlin Challenge Cup. Since the 2014–15 season, the top Premiership sides compete in the Champions Cup, with the rest of the league involved in the new European Rugby Challenge Cup.

Following the 2017–18 edition of the Anglo-Welsh Cup, the Welsh regions pulled out of the competition in favour of creating a dedicated U-23 competition for that country alone. Premiership Rugby, the company that operates the top English flight, then announced that it would launch the new Premiership Rugby Cup, featuring all 12 league members, effective with the 2018–19 season. The competition will also feature Championship teams in 2023–24.

=== British and Irish Cup ===
The British and Irish Cup was a competition founded in 2009–10 by all four Home Unions for lower-tier professional and semi-pro teams throughout Great Britain and Ireland. In the competition's third season it was expanded to 32 sides from its original 24; it featured all twelve teams from both the RFU Championship and the Welsh Premier Division (the level below Pro14), "A" sides from all four Irish provinces, and the top four sides from the Scottish Premiership. The 32 teams were divided into eight pools, each with a round-robin format. The pool winners then advance to knockout quarter-finals, followed by semi-finals and a final. For season 2013–14 the competition returned to 24 sides with the reduction of Welsh clubs from twelve to four. The final English team to have won are Ealing Trailfinders in 2018. In England the tournament was replaced by the Championship Cup.

=== National Schools Cup ===
The National Schools Cup is the English school's rugby union cup competition. The cup and vase finals are held at Twickenham Stadium. Competitions are held at the U18 and U15 age group levels. At each age group there are four competitions, with stronger teams entering the cup and weaker teams in the vase, and first round losers of each entering the plate and bowl respectively.

=== Middlesex 7s ===
The Middlesex 7s is the premier club-level rugby sevens event held in England (note, however, that international sides have taken part on occasion).

=== London Sevens ===
National men's sevens teams compete annually in the London Sevens at Twickenham, which has usually been the final event in each season's World Rugby Sevens Series since 2011–12, though it is not the final event in the current 2017–18 series.

== Premiership Derbies ==
The following games are considered premiership derbies.

- Midlands derbies - between Northampton Saints and Leicester Tigers
- West Country derbies - historically between Bath, Bristol and Gloucester, and now also including Exeter Chiefs
- London derby - between Harlequins and Saracens.

Historically London derbies featured London Irish until they were wound-up in 2023. Prior to that Wasps also contested the derbies, notably the London Double Header involving all four 'London' teams (despite Wasps not having played in London since 2002) until their liquidation in 2022.

Midlands derbies had featured Worcester Warriors prior to their liquidation in 2022.

Northern England, in which Rugby league is dominant, does not have an established derby rivalry in the top tier; the two northern outposts of Sale Sharks and Newcastle Falcons represent the fifteen-man game in the region. In the past, Leeds Carnegie, Doncaster Knights and Rotherham Titans have contested Yorkshire derbies, while Liverpool St. Helens and Orrell R.F.C. have provided local Lancashire rivalries.

== Popularity ==
=== Participation ===
According to World Rugby, England has 1,900 rugby union clubs; 6,060 referees; 362,319 pre-teen male players; 698,803 teen male players; 121,480 senior male players (total male players 1,182,602) as well as 11,000 senior female players. A 2010 Sport England survey indicated that 170,200 people play rugby at least once a week.

Rugby union has often been considered, somewhat pejoratively, a 'posh' game. This may be historically linked to the split between Northern teams and the rest of the rugby fraternity over 'broken time payments', i.e. professionalism. This split led to the development of the separate sport of rugby league. The amateur ethos made it difficult for players who could not afford to take time off work to play away games or to go on tour - an integral part of the rugby tradition. Rugby union in many parts of England is associated with fee-paying independent schools such as Stonyhurst College or Sedbergh School who have historically provided many of the national players. It is also commonly played at Grammar schools, but Comprehensive schools in much of the country tended not to play the game, although this is no longer the case. Whilst rugby union was officially an amateur sport, many rugby union players came to play rugby league. In recent years this trend has reversed and some rugby league players have crossed codes to play union.

Due to the split with most of the Yorkshire and Lancashire clubs, rugby union remained more popular in the South and the Midlands than the North of England, although this trend is now nowhere near as prevalent, with many teams in the North able to field four or five senior sides per week. The Newcastle Falcons and Sale Sharks are the only Northern teams in the Premiership, whereas Yorkshire Carnegie has also competed there previously.

Although three of the teams in the Premiership have historic links with London, one of these has now moved to a neighbouring town, and only Harlequins and Saracens now play in the capital, respectively in the outer suburbs of Twickenham and Hendon (Saracens had also played in a neighbouring town before returning to London in early 2013). Historically, London was host to a number of high level professional 'exiles' clubs, notably London Scottish, London Welsh and most successfully London Irish, as well as to the defunct Wasps before its ill-fated moved north to the city of Coventry. At an amateur level, however, rugby remains very strong in the London area.

As of July 2022, transgender women are prohibited from playing contact rugby in women's competition; they remain eligible for male competition, in line with World Rugby rules. Transgender men may play in male competition, but have to carry out a risk assessment and sign a disclaimer, as their inclusion in the men's game as seen as more dangerous to themselves than to opponents. Both rules have provoked controversy in terms of trans inclusion, and women's safety.

=== Interest in the population and viewing figures ===
English rugby union receives extensive coverage from major media outlets. Currently TNT Sports, a pay channel owned by Warner Bros Discovery, covers the majority of Gallagher Premiership games, while ITV produces highlights programmes and associated content on free-to-air. The BBC and ITV share coverage of the Six Nations, Sky covers England's June & November internationals as well as British and Irish Lions fixtures which features England players, and ITV covers the Rugby World Cup. Premier Sports have coverage of the European club competitions.

Coverage of women's rugby in England has also expanded significantly in recent years, with TNT Sports hosting matches from the Allianz Premiership Women's Rugby league, formally the Premier XVs, and the Women's Six Nations Championship aired on BBC channels both on-air, and online. No European wide competition for elite English teams exists in the women's game.

The percentage of people declaring to be interested in rugby union in England has been fairly constant over the period 1996–2005, for which we have data. This proportion decreased slightly from 24% in 1995 to 18% before the 2003 Rugby World Cup, it jumped to 27% after England's victory over Australia in the World Cup final. In 2005, 23% of the population were declaring an interest in rugby union, placing this sport at the 6th place in England. To the question whether they watch rugby union on TV, 21% of sampled people answered positively in 2005, up two points relative to 1996 (19%). In this category, it places rugby union at the second place in England behind football. The viewing figures for the final of the Premiership indicate that 91,000 viewers watched the 2011 final on TV when it was broadcast on ESPN for the first time. In 2010, the final was watched by 225,000 viewers on Sky.

In terms of average attendance, the Gallagher Premiership is the third best attended club competition in England behind the top two association football leagues, the Premier League and The Championship. The highest club attendances at Gallagher Premiership matches are starting to become similar to some of the lower attended matches in football's Championship, with game attendances averaging 12,500 in 2011 compared with 17,400 in the football Championship.

Historically rugby union was a participatory sport rather than a spectator sport in England and attendances at club games were low. Leicester Tigers for example averaged less than a hundred spectators in the 1970s. However, attendances at Twickenham for the national team have always been very high. Games in the Six Nations Championship and Rugby World Cup have always been shown on network TV. Th Six Nations, in particular, has a national cultural latency far in excess of the club game, and many people watch these games but don't follow club rugby.

Research from 2003 stated that the majority of spectators are from the AB1 demographic group with a gender ratio of approximately 80% male and 20% female at live domestic professional matches. However, this is a general picture of the sport across the country as a whole and, in some parts of the country, the game has widespread grassroots support. This is particularly true of the West Country, especially in Cornwall and in the cities of Bristol, Bath and Gloucester, where the game is more popular without significant class differentiation. In the Midlands, the game competes with football and the larger clubs, such as Leicester Tigers, Northampton Saints and Coventry, have considerable fanbases and strong traditions.

== The national teams ==
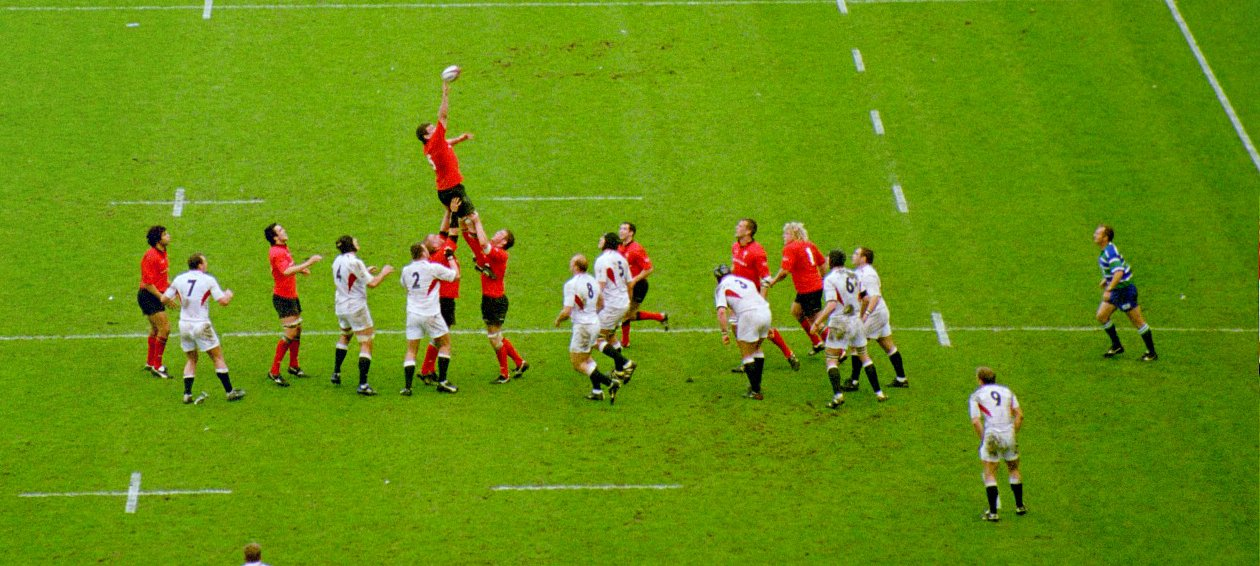
England playing Wales in the Six Nations.

The England national team is currently the second best team in the history of the Six Nations Championship with three titles and one Grand Slam. When taking into account the Home Nations and Five Nations tournaments, England has more title and Grand Slams than any other nation. England contest the Calcutta Cup with Scotland and the Millennium Trophy with Ireland as part of the Six Nations Championship. They were World Champions from 2003 to 2007 and also made the finals of the 1991 and 2007 World Cups. World Rugby currently ranks England men at 3rd out of 95 union-playing countries. They play their home games at Twickenham in Middlesex. "Swing Low, Sweet Chariot" is a song associated with the national rugby union team even though it was originally sung by black slaves on the cotton fields in the south of the U.S.A. Every four years the British and Irish Lions go on tour with players from England as well as Ireland, Scotland and Wales.

England's Red Roses won the 2025 Women's Rugby World Cup.

== See also ==
- Rugby union in the British Isles
- Rugby union in London
- Sport in England
- Sport in London
- Rugby league in England
- English rugby union system
- History of the English rugby union system
- Concussions in rugby union

== Bibliography ==
- Collins, Tony (2009); A Social History of English Rugby Union, Routledge. ISBN 978-0-415-47660-7.
- Richards, Huw A Game for Hooligans: The History of Rugby Union (Mainstream Publishing, Edinburgh, 2007, ISBN 978-1-84596-255-5)
