= James Hadfield (rugby union) =

English rugby union player

- Born: James Hadfield; 27 November 1997 (age 28) Brighton and Hove, England
- Height: 1.8 m (5 ft 11 in)
- Weight: 104 kg (16 st 5 lb)
- University: University of Bath

Rugby union career
- Position: Hooker
- Current team: Saracens
Senior career
Years	Team	Apps	(Points)
2019–21	Bath	—	(—)
2021–22	Richmond	—	(—)
2022–23	Jersey Reds	16	(55)
2023–	Saracens	13	(45)
2024	→Ampthill	2	(5)
- Correct as of 30 November 2024

James Hadfield is an English professional rugby union player who plays as a hooker for Premiership Rugby club Saracens.

== Rugby career ==
Originally from Brighton and Hove in East Sussex, Hadfield attended the University of Bath between 2017 and 2021, and represented their rugby union team while studying for a degree in health and exercise science. He helped the team to reach the semi-final stages of BUCS Super Rugby twice during this period. From 2019, Hadfield was also dual-registered with Premiership club Bath, appearing for the Bath United reserve team in the Premiership Rugby Shield.

Following graduation from university, Hadfield signed with RFU Championship club Richmond for the 2021–22 season, before transferring to league rivals Jersey Reds a year later. In the 2022–23 season, he scored 11 tries as Jersey won the Championship title for the first time in their history – including a try in the decisive 43–15 win against Ampthill.

On 29 September 2023, Hadfield was made redundant, along with the rest of the Jersey Reds playing squad and staff, after the club ceased trading and went into administration. However, a week later, he found a new club, signing for reigning Premiership champions Saracens – initially on a short-term deal, which was later extended until the end of the 2023–24 season. Hadfield made his Premiership debut away at Exeter Chiefs in October 2023, while his first Premiership tries arrived in the reverse fixture against Exeter in January 2024, when he scored a brace on the way to a 40–22 victory. Subsequently, he agreed an 18-month contract extension with Saracens.

In the 2024–25 season, Hadfield notably equalled the English top-flight record for most tries scored in a single match, when he crossed the whitewash 6 times for Saracens, during their 99–27 win over London Scottish in the Premiership Rugby Cup. He was also dual-registered with Championship club Ampthill for the duration of the season.
