= David Williams (rugby union, born 1995) =

English rugby union player

- Born: David Christopher Williams; 8 December 1995 (age 30) Leicester
- Height: 1.85 m (6 ft 1 in)
- Weight: 91 kg (201 lb)
- School: Lancaster Boys School (Leicester); Wyggeston and Queen Elizabeth I College
- University: Nottingham Trent University

Rugby union career
- Position: Wing
- Current team: Nottingham
Senior career
Years	Team	Apps	(Points)
2012–2015	Leicester Tigers	0	(0)
2014–2015	→Leicester Lions (loan)	10	(20)
2015–2016	Ebbw Vale		
2016–	Nottingham	114	(400)
2020–2021	Leicester Tigers (loan)	6	(5)
- Correct as of 18 October 2020

David Christopher Williams (born 8 December 1995) is an English professional rugby union player for Nottingham in the RFU Championship. His usual position is wing. He has also played for Leicester Tigers in Premiership Rugby.

== Career ==
Born in Leicester, Williams was raised locally attending Lancaster Boys School and Wyggeston and Queen Elizabeth I College. In 2012 he joined Leicester Tigers academy, Williams featured in the Premiership Rugby Sevens Series in 2013, and 2014. He joined Ebbw Vale in the Welsh Premier Division for the 2015-16 season, scoring twice as Vale won the title against Pontypridd.

In 2016 he returned to England to sign with second division Nottingham and complete his degree at Nottingham Trent University.

In July 2020 Williams re-joined Leicester on loan to complete the 2019–20 Premiership Rugby season. He made his debut against Exeter Chiefs in the first game of the resumed season and scored the only try in Leicester's win against London Irish.

On 11 November 2020 it was announced his loan with Leicester had been extended for the 2020–21 Premiership Rugby season.

As of 2023, he plays for Nottingham Rugby in the RFU Championship.

== Individual ==
- 2022–23 RFU Championship Cup joint top try scorer
