= Carwyn Penny =

Welsh rugby union player

- Born: Carwyn Penny; 17 November 1998 (age 27) Wales
- Height: 179 cm (5 ft 10 in)
- Weight: 81 kg (12 st 11 lb)

Rugby union career
- Position: Fullback
- Current team: Dragons
Senior career
Years	Team	Apps	(Points)
2017	Gloucester	1	(0)
2020–	Dragons	2	(0)
- Correct as of 28 January 2020
International career
Years	Team	Apps	(Points)
- Wales U20

Carwyn Penny (born 17 November 1998) is a Welsh rugby union player who plays for Dragons as a fullback. He was a Wales under-20 international.

Penny made his debut for the Dragons regional team in 2020 having previously played for the Gloucester, Dragons academy and Dragons transitional side.
