= Russell Bennett (rugby union) =

South African rugby union player

- Born: Russell George Bennett; 22 November 1971 (age 54) Adelaide, Eastern Cape
- Height: 1.87 m (6 ft 2 in)
- Weight: 97 kg (214 lb)
- School: St. Andrew’s College

Rugby union career
- Position: Fullback
Provincial / State sides
Years	Team	Apps	(Points)
–	Sharks		
- Border
Super Rugby
Years	Team	Apps	(Points)
1998–2000	Sharks		
International career
Years	Team	Apps	(Points)
1997	South Africa	6	(10)

Russell George Bennett (born 22 November 1971) is a South African former rugby union player.

== Playing career ==
Bennett made his test debut for the Springboks as a replacement in 1997 against Tonga at Newlands in Cape Town. He then played in two test matches against the touring British Lions team and in three test matches during the 1997 Tri Nations Series. The previous year, 1996, he toured with the Springboks to Argentina and Europe and played four tour matches, scoring three tries.

=== Test history ===
No.	Opponents	Results (SA 1st)	Position	Points	Dates	Venue
1.	Tonga	74–10	Replacement		10 Jun 1997	Newlands, Cape Town
2.	British Lions	16–25	Replacement	1	21 Jun 1997	Newlands, Cape Town
3.	British Lions	35–16	Fullback		5 Jul 1997	Ellis Park, Johannesburg
4.	New Zealand	32–35	Fullback	1	19 Jul 1997	Ellis Park, Johannesburg
5.	Australia	20–32	Fullback		2 Aug 1997	Suncorp Stadium, Brisbane
6.	New Zealand	35–55	Fullback		9 Aug 1997	Eden Park, Auckland hannesburg

== See also ==
- List of South Africa national rugby union players – Springbok no. 640
