= Jake Garside =

English rugby union player (born 2002)

- Born: Jack Garside; 1 September 2002 (age 24) Norfolk, England
- Height: 1.71 m (5 ft 7 1/2 in)
- Weight: 76 kg (12.0 st; 168 lb)
- School: Norwich School

Rugby union career
- Position(s): Scrum-half,Winger
Amateur team(s)
Years	Team	Apps	(Points)
- Wymondham RFC
Senior career
Years	Team	Apps	(Points)
2021–2025	Northampton Saints	18	(15)
2021–2025	→ Bedford Blues (loan)	28	(45)
2023	Cambridge	1	(0)
2025–	Worcester Warriors	17	(55)
International career
Years	Team	Apps	(Points)
2020-2021	England U18s		
- Correct as of 5 Dec 2025

Jake Garside (born 1 September 2002) is an English rugby union player who plays for Worcester Warriors in the Champ Rugby. His main position is at scrum-half.

Garside previously represented Wymondham RFC, having also joined the Saints Academy set-up initially at junior level. Garside was named in England's under-17 training squad in 2020 before representing England at under-18 level.

He made his competitive debut for Northampton against Newcastle Falcons in the Premiership Rugby Cup back in March 2022. Garside was also dual-registered with Bedford Blues and Cambridge in the RFU Championship in recent seasons.

On 4 June 2025, Garside would leave Northampton to join re-vamped Worcester Warriors, with his brother Alfie Garside, back in the Champ Rugby from the 2025–26 season.
