= RFU Championship Cup =

Annual rugby union competition

- Current season or competition: 2022–23 RFU Championship Cup
- Sport: Rugby union
- Instituted: 2018; 7 years ago
- Inaugural season: 2018–19
- Ceased: 2023; 2 years ago
- Number of teams: 12
- Nations: England; Jersey
- Holders: Ealing Trailfinders (3rd title) (2022–23)
- Most titles: Ealing Trailfinders (3 titles)
- Website: RFU
- Related competition: RFU Championship

The RFU Championship Cup was an annual rugby union competition introduced by the Rugby Football Union (RFU) in 2018 to provide a cup competition for English second-tier clubs playing in the RFU Championship, following the disbanding of the British and Irish Cup at the end of the 2017–18 season. The Championship Cup was initially scheduled to take place for at least two seasons.

== History ==
Between 2009 and 2018, English tier 2 clubs played in the British and Irish Cup. The British and Irish Cup was initially a strong and interesting competition, but this started to change at the end of the 2013–14 when the Scottish clubs decided to pull out due to fixture congestion, and then in 2014–15 the Welsh Rugby Union (WRU) made the controversial decision to switch their club representatives to select XV sides based on the Pro14 clubs. These changes saw a decline in interest in the competition, mirrored by falling attendances. The death knell sounded when the English Championship clubs pulled out at the end of the 2017–18 season, deciding to create their own competition.

At the same time as the demise of the British and Irish Cup, the Anglo-Welsh Cup also had its final season with the Welsh Pro14 sides pulling out due to difficulties faced with putting out competitive teams. With both competitions ending there seemed to be an opportunity for both the English Premiership and Championship clubs to form their own competition. This never materialised as the Premiership sides announced the new Premiership Cup competition, featuring tier 1 sides only. In June 2018 the RFU announced the Championship Cup. While the RFU hailed the new competition as a positive step for the second tier, with a regionalised format encouraging derby rivalries, reaction from Championship club supporters was muted, with many feeling an opportunity was missed to create a meaningful competition combining the 24 professional sides in England, and others expressing dissatisfaction with a format that would see some clubs face each other four times a season. Positive reactions included the cup being used by clubs as a mid-season break in which first team players can be rested, with fringe players getting game time.

== Format ==
The current competition format is a group stage followed by a knockout stage. The group stage consists of three (roughly) regional groups of four teams each playing home and away matches. Group matches run for six consecutive weeks through November to December following a break in the RFU Championship league campaign. The top two sides in each group, plus the two best third-placed teams, progress to the knockout stage, with the best-ranked sides receiving home advantage in the quarter-finals. The four winning quarter-finalists progress to the semi-finals with the winners playing in the final in May.

== Finals ==
| Year | Winner | Score | Runner-up | Venue | Attendance |
|---|---|---|---|---|---|
| 2018–19 | Ealing Trailfinders | 23 – 17 | London Irish | Trailfinders Sports Ground | 3,627 |
| 2019–20 | | Cancelled mid-season due to COVID-19 pandemic in the United Kingdom. | | | |
| 2020–21 | | Cancelled due to COVID-19 pandemic in the United Kingdom. | | | |
| 2021–22 | Ealing Trailfinders | 19 – 13 | Coventry | Trailfinders Sports Ground | 2,400 |
| 2022–23 | Ealing Trailfinders | 35 – 31 | Jersey Reds | Trailfinders Sports Ground | 1,225 |

== See also ==
- RFU Championship
- British and Irish Cup
