= St. Peter (rugby ground) =

Coordinates: 49°12′20″N 2°10′57″W

Stade Santander International
- Interactive map of Stade Santander International
- Full name: Stade Santander International
- Location: Saint Peter, Jersey
- Owner: Jersey RFC
- Operator: Jersey RFC
- Capacity: 4,000
- Surface: grass

Tenant
- Jersey Reds

St. Peter (currently known as Stade Santander International for sponsorship reasons) is a rugby ground in Saint Peter, Jersey and is home to Jersey RFC, who play in the Regional 1 South Central, the fifth level of the Rugby Football Union's league pyramid. The ground is located within walking distance of Jersey Airport. The ground also hosted the now defunct professional Jersey Reds' Siam Cup games against Guernsey every 2 years.

== Developments ==
Due to Jersey's relatively quick rise through the leagues, the St. Peter ground has had to undergo redevelopments quickly. In order to prepare for promotion to National League 1 in 2011, Jersey applied for planning permission for floodlights to be erected on the ground. Jersey had previously received a grant to erect floodlights on the nearby training pitch in 2007. Floodlights are a mandatory requirement for clubs in National League 1. This came a year after the opening of the Lord Jersey Stand and a new pavilion by William Villiers, 10th Earl of Jersey and the Lieutenant Governor of Jersey, Andrew Ridgway to go with their clubhouse. They were built mainly to grant better facilities for spectators.

In 2012, with Jersey closing in on promotion to the Championship, the club announced possible plans to build a new terrace as well as a gym and player accommodation. They averaged about 2,000 fans in 2011-12, which easily led the third-level National League 1, and frequently drew over 3,000 for big matches including a club record crowd of 3,648 for the 20-18 win over Rosslyn Park on 25 January 2012.

== History ==
The ground has seen a number of major events in Jersey's history. In 2010 it hosted Jersey's National League 3 South East play-off victory against Taunton R.F.C. Jersey then went on to win the final against Ampthill at Twickenham Stadium in London, England. The St Peter ground also hosted Jersey's matches against Old Albanian RFC and Shelford in 2011 that made sure that Jersey would reach the National League 2 South play-offs. The ground also hosted Jersey's National League 2 South play-off final victory against Loughborough Students RUFC.

However, arguably the two biggest events in Jersey's rugby history to date—their 37–13 win over Coventry that secured their promotion to the 2012–13 Championship, and their 41–31 win over Bedford Blues that saved them from relegation at the end of the 2013–14 Championship—did not take place on the island. The former match was played in Coventry, and the latter in Bedford.
