= Castle Park rugby stadium =

Sports venue in Doncaster, England

Coordinates: 53°32′1″N 1°4′41″W

Castle Park
- Interactive map of Castle Park
- Location: Doncaster, South Yorkshire
- Capacity: 5,183 (1,926 seats)

Tenant
- Doncaster R.F.C.

Castle Park is a sports stadium in Doncaster, South Yorkshire. It is the home of the Doncaster Knights, a Rugby Union side who play in the RFU Championship. Historically it was known as Armthorpe Road, but was renamed in 2000. In 2008 the club opened the £3m all-seater De Mulder-Lloyd Stand with a capacity of 1,650. Capacity was around 5,000 up until the 2021–21 season where the club expanded the ground up to 5,183 with 1,926 seats.
