= Mennaye Field =

Sports venue in Penzance, England

Coordinates: 50°6′47″N 5°32′38″W

- Interactive map of Mennaye Field
- Location: Penzance, Cornwall
- Owner: Cornwall Council
- Operator: Cornish Pirates
- Capacity: 4,000 (2,200 seats)
- Surface: Grass

Construction
- Built: 1945
- Opened: Saturday, 22 September 1945

Tenants
- Cornish Pirates; Penzance-Newlyn Amateurs

The Mennaye Field is a sports stadium located in Penzance, Cornwall, UK. The ground was provided by the Borough of Penzance for the Penzance and Newlyn RFC formed on Tuesday, 12 December 1944 with the amalgamation of Penzance RFC and Newlyn RFC. The current tenants are the Cornish Pirates rugby union team, who play in the RFU Championship. The club moved, in 2005, to a temporary stadium at Kenwyn, near Truro and the following year to Camborne Recreation Ground. In 2010 the club returned to the Mennaye Field and announced that the capacity would increase from its original 3,500 to 4,000, including 2,200 seats.

== History ==
The first mention of playing rugby in the Mennaye Fields was in January 1934 when a sub-committee was set up to negotiate with the Borough of Penzance for the tenancy of the fields; finally granted in 1945. The ground was equi-distant between St Goulder (Newlyn's ground) and St Clare (Penzance's ground).

General Dwight D Eisenhower, the Supreme Commander of the Allied Forces in Europe inspected American troops on 26 June 1944 at the Mennaye. Soldiers of the 1st Battalion of the 35th Division had been billeted with families in Penzance. The troops marched along the promenade to the Mennaye where Eisenhower, along with General George S Patton, took a salute on the bank. The 1st Battalion, was part of the back-up to the initial D-Day landings on 6 June 1944, leaving Penzance on 4 July and reaching Normandy the next day.

== List of tenants ==
- 1945 – 2005, Penzance-Newlyn RFC/Cornish Pirates
- 1945 – 1973, Mounts Bay RFC (under-18)
- 1974 – present, Pirates Colts
- 1999 – 2009, Mounts Bay RFC
- 2010 – present, Penzance-Newlyn Amateurs
- 2010 – present, Cornish Pirates

== First match ==
- 22 September 1945: Penzance–Newlyn v Guy's Hospital 3 – 15 (att 3,000).
