= Goldington Road =

Rugby union stadium

Coordinates: 52.1404°N 0.4575°W

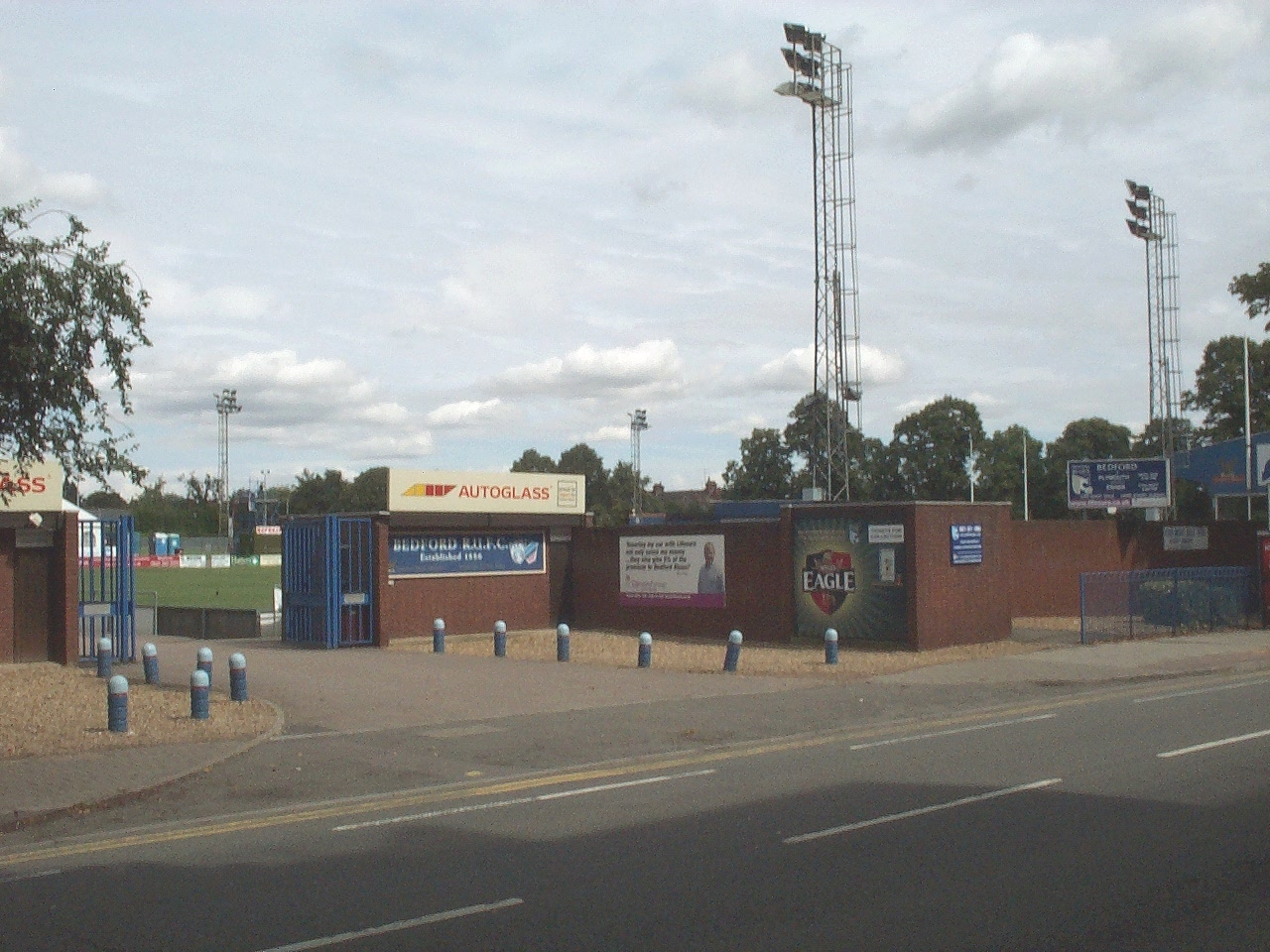
- Interactive map of Goldington Road
- Location: Bedford, England
- Capacity: 5,531
- Surface: Grass
- Record attendance: 6,000

Construction
- Groundbreaking: 1886

Tenant
- Bedford Blues (1886–present)

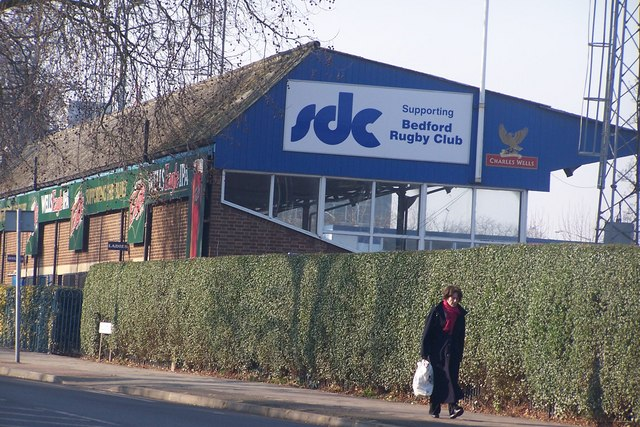
The main stand at Goldington Road

Goldington Road is a rugby ground in the De Parys area of Bedford, Bedfordshire, England. It is the home stadium of Bedford Blues.

== History ==
The ground was home to the Bedford Swifts, who merged with Bedford Rovers to form Bedford RUFC in 1886, with the new club remaining at Goldington Road. The new club's first match at the ground was on 9 October 1886 against Olney, with Bedford winning 10–3.

The first stand was built in 1905. In the same year the record attendance of 6,000 was set for a match against the New Zealand national rugby union team on 15 November, which the visitors won 41–0.

A pavilion was built in 1910 and a grandstand in 1933.

== See also ==
- List of rugby union stadiums by capacity
- List of English rugby league stadiums by capacity
- List of European stadiums by capacity
