= 2018–19 RFU Championship Cup =

Season of rugby tournament

Tournament details
- Countries: England Jersey
- Tournament format(s): Round-robin and knockout
- Date: November 2018 — May 2019

Tournament statistics
- Teams: 12
- Matches played: 43
- Attendance: 47,350 (1,101 per match)
- Highest attendance: 3,627; Ealing v London Irish; 4 May 2019
- Lowest attendance: 267; Ealing v Nottingham; 2 February 2019
- Tries scored: 271 (6.3 per match)
- Top point scorer(s): (Argentina) Javier Rojas Alvarez (Cornish Pirates); 65 points
- Top try scorer(s): (Scotland) Jack Macfarlane (Jersey Reds) (England) Jordan Burns (Ealing Trailfinders); 8 tries each

Final
- Venue: Trailfinders Sports Ground
- Attendance: 3,627
- Champions: Ealing Trailfinders (1st title)
- Runners-up: London Irish

The 2018–19 RFU Championship Cup was the inaugural season of the annual rugby union Championship Cup competition for second tier, professional English clubs playing in the RFU Championship. It was formed following the discontinuation of the British and Irish Cup at the end of the 2017–18 season.

The inaugural winners were Ealing Trailfinders who defeated London Irish 23–17 in the final held at the Trailfinders Sports Ground. It was a deserved victory for Ealing, who were the best side in the competition, and was their second win in a cup competition in two seasons, having won the British and Irish Cup the previous season. Runner-up London Irish, who had won the Championship league title a few weeks earlier, missed out on a notable double.

== Competition format ==
The competition format was a group stage followed by a knockout stage. The group stage consisted of three (roughly) regional groups of four teams each playing home and away matches. Group matches ran for six consecutive weeks from November through to December following a break in the RFU Championship league campaign.

The top two sides in each group, plus the two best third-placed teams, progressed to the knockout stage, with the best ranked sides receiving home advantage in the quarter-finals. The four winning quarter-finalists progressed to the semi-finals with the winners playing in the final in May 2019.

== Participating teams and locations ==
Team	Ground	Capacity	City/Area
Bedford Blues	Goldington Road	5,000 (1,700 seats)	Bedford, Bedfordshire
Cornish Pirates	Mennaye Field	4,000 (2,200 seats)	Penzance, Cornwall
Coventry	Butts Park Arena	4,000 (3,000 seats)	Coventry, West Midlands
Doncaster Knights	Castle Park	5,000	Doncaster, South Yorkshire
Ealing Trailfinders	Trailfinders Sports Ground	4,000 (2,200 seats) (Note: Trailfinders Sports Ground capacity was raised from 3,020 (1,200 seats) to 4,000 (2,200 seats) on 3 February 2019.)	West Ealing, London
Hartpury College	Gillman's Ground	2,000	Hartpury, Gloucestershire
Jersey Reds	Stade Santander International	4,000	Saint Peter, Jersey
London Irish	Madejski Stadium	24,161 (Note: Although Madejski's full capacity is 24,161, for most matches only the West Stand was opened with capacity of 7,579.)	Reading, Berkshire
London Scottish	Athletic Ground	4,500	Richmond, London, London
Nottingham	Lady Bay Sports Ground	3,000	Nottingham, Nottinghamshire
Richmond	Athletic Ground	4,500	Richmond, London, London
Yorkshire Carnegie	Emerald Headingley Stadium; Laund Hill; Brantingham Park	21,062; 2,000; 1,500	Leeds, West Yorkshire; Huddersfield, West Yorkshire; Kingston upon Hull, East Riding

Locations of the 2018–19 RFU Championship Cup teams(color by pool)

== Group stage ==
=== Group 1 (North) ===
Group 1
	Club	Played	Won	Drawn	Lost	Points For	Points Against	Points Difference	Tries For	Tries Against	Try Bonus	Losing Bonus	Points
1	Yorkshire Carnegie (Q)	6	5	0	1	165	135	30	20	19	2	0	22
2	Coventry (Q)	6	3	0	3	175	164	11	26	22	4	1	17
3	Nottingham (Q)	6	2	0	4	141	165	-24	20	24	2	2	12
4	Doncaster Knights	6	2	0	4	118	135	-17	15	16	1	3	12
If teams are level at any stage, tiebreakers are applied in the following order: 1. Number of matches won 2. Total number of tries scored 3. Total number of points for 4. Difference between points for and against 5. Fewest red cards 6. Coin toss
Green background means the club qualified for the quarter-finals as either group winner or best runner-up. Blue background means the club qualified for the quarter-finals as runner up or one of two best 3rd placed sides. Updated: 15 December 2018; Source: "Championship Cup 2018-19". englandrugby.com.

==== Round 1 ====
10 November 2018
13:00

(1 BP) Yorkshire Carnegie	38 – 19	Nottingham
Try: Frost 5' c Umaga 23' c Kiri Kiri (2) 30' m, 47' c Temm 32' m Hill 44' m Con: Te Rure (4/6) 6', 23', 46', 48'	Report	Try: Millett (2) 13' c, 54' m Graham 80' c Con: Lyons (2/3) 14', 80'

Laund Hill, Huddersfield
Attendance: 324
Referee: George Selwood

10 November 2018
14:30

Doncaster Knights	20 – 19	Coventry (1 BP)
Try: Owen 17 c Booth 66' c Con: Foley (2/2) 17', 66'; Pen: Foley (2) 9', 37'	Report	Try: Bulumakau 40' c Stokes (2) 57' m, 79' c Con: Maisey (2/3) 40', 79'

Castle Park
Attendance: 867
Referee: Matt Turvey

==== Round 2 ====
16 November 2018
19:45

(1 BP) Nottingham	13 – 17	Doncaster Knights
Try: Penman 41' c Con: Lyons (1/1) 41'; Pen: Lyons (2) 30', 58'	Report	Try: Malcolm 10' c James 50' c Con: Flockhart (2/2) 16', 50'; Pen: Flockhart 23'

Lady Bay Sports Ground
Attendance: 855
Referee: Tim Wigglesworth

17 November 2018
15:00

(1 BP) Coventry	51 – 32	Yorkshire Carnegie (1 BP)
Try: Trimble (2) 20' c, 74' c Bulumakau (2) 33' c, 73' m Knox 39' m Lewis 53' c Fenner 76' c Con: Maisey (4/6) 20', 33', 53', 74'; Lewis (1/1) 76'; Pen: Maisey (2) 6', 29'	Report	Try: Elder (2) 10' c, 58' c Forsyth 42' m Smith 67' c Con: Umaga (3/4) 10', 58', 67'; Pen: Umaga (2) 16', 69'

Butts Park Arena
Attendance: 1,904
Referee: Neil Chivers

==== Round 3 ====
24 November 2018
12:00

Yorkshire Carnegie	33 – 20	Doncaster Knights
Try: Temm 30' c Davey 39' c Elder 59' c Con: Umaga (2/2) 30', 39'; Te Ture (1/1) 59'; Pen: Umaga (4) 4', 8', 18', 37'		Try: Hunter (2) 67' c, 80' m Wilson 75' m Con: Flockhart (1/3) 67'; Pen: Flockhart 15'

Brantingham Park, Kingston upon Hull
Attendance: 585
Referee: Simon Harding

24 November 2018
15:00

(1 BP) Coventry	45 – 35	Nottingham (1 BP)
Try: Knox 8' c Trimble (3) 11' c, 37' m, 70' m Titchard-Jones 16' c Nilsen 57' c Lewis 72' c Con: Maisey (5/7) 8', 11', 16', 57', 72'	Report	Try: Farnworth (2) 22' c, 40' c Peters 33'c Goble 45' c Cardall 65' c Con: Veenendaal (5/5) 22', 33', 40', 45', 65'

Butts Park Arena
Attendance: 1,686
Referee: Tim Wigglesworth

==== Round 4 ====
30 November 2018
19:45

(1 BP) Nottingham	33 – 24	Coventry (1 BP)
Try: Owen 11' c Cobden 18' m Williams 29' c Coghlan 56' c Farnworth 74' c Con: Veenendaal (4/5) 11', 29', 56', 74'	Report	Try: Maisey 27' c Makaafi 32' c Faleafa 61' m Kessell 62' m Con: Maisey (2/4) 28', 32'

Lady Bay Sports Ground
Attendance: 913
Referee: John Meredith

1 December 2018
14:30

Doncaster Knights	18 – 20	Yorkshire Carnegie
Try: Owen 24' c Stedman 40' m Con: Morath (1/2) 24'; Pen: Morath (2) 3', 32'	Report	Try: Donnellan (2) 28', 68'; Con: Umaga (2/2) 28', 68'; Pen: Umaga (2) 37', 50'

Castle Park
Attendance: 894
Referee: Dean Richards

==== Round 5 ====
8 December 2018
15:00

(1 BP) Coventry	30 – 29	Doncaster Knights (2 BP)
Try: Dawidiuk 59' m Bulumakau 66' m Knox 68' c Tuitupou 73' m Con: Maisey (1/4) 68'; Pen: Knox (2) 9', 15'; Maisey 17'	Report	Try: Quigley 6' c Hunter 29' m Owen 79' c Cowell 80' c Con: Flockhart (3/4) 6', 79', 80'; Pen: Flockhart 62'

Butts Park Arena
Attendance: 2,028
Referee: George Selwood

9 December 2018
15:00

(1 BP) Nottingham	22 – 27	Yorkshire Carnegie
Try: Peters 2' c Coghlan 15' c Sirker 57' m Con: O'Leary (2/3) 2', 15'; Pen: O'Leary (1/2) 40'	Report	Try: Lucock 11' c Buckle 28' c Niko 36' c Con: Umaga (3/3) 11', 28', 36'; Pen: Umaga (2/2) 5', 43'

Lady Bay Sports Ground
Attendance: 635
Referee: Neil Chivers

==== Round 6 ====
15 December 2018
14:00

(1 BP) Doncaster Knights	14 – 19	Nottingham
Try: Penalty try 15'; Sproston 64' c Con: Foley (1/1) 64'	Report	Try: McConnell 2' c Heffernan 32' m Goble 40' c Con: Lyons (2/3) 3', 40'

Castle Park
Attendance: 648
Referee: Matt Turvey

15 December 2018
14:00

Yorkshire Carnegie	15 – 5	Coventry
Try: Niko 39' c Davey 46' m Con: Te Rure (1/2) 39'; Pen: Te Rure 33'	Report	Try: Ram 23' m Con: Maisey (0/1)

Emerald Headingley Stadium
Attendance: 750
Referee: Alexander Thomas

=== Group 2 (London & South East) ===
Group 2
	Club	Played	Won	Drawn	Lost	Points For	Points Against	Points Difference	Tries For	Tries Against	Try Bonus	Losing Bonus	Points
1	Ealing Trailfinders (Q)	6	5	0	1	180	98	82	26	13	5	1	26
2	Jersey Reds (Q)	6	5	0	1	194	101	93	28	11	4	1	25
3	London Scottish	6	1	0	5	69	132	-63	7	19	0	2	6
4	Richmond	6	1	0	5	51	163	-112	7	24	0	1	5
If teams are level at any stage, tiebreakers are applied in the following order: 1. Number of matches won 2. Total number of tries scored 3. Total number of points for 4. Difference between points for and against 5. Fewest red cards 6. Coin toss
Green background means the club qualified for the quarter-finals as either group winner or best runner-up. Blue background means the club qualified for the quarter-finals as runner up or one of two best 3rd placed sides. Updated: 15 December 2018; Source: "Championship Cup 2018-19". englandrugby.com.

==== Round 1 ====
9 November 2018
20:00

London Scottish	10 – 6	Richmond (1 BP)
Try: Duncan 31' c Con: Perry (1/1) 32'; Pen: Perry 49'	Report	Pen: Kirby (2) 22', 46'

Athletic Ground
Attendance: 1,393
Referee: Alexander Thomas

11 November 2018
14:00

(2 BP) Ealing Trailfinders	34 – 41	Jersey Reds (1 BP)
Try: Tuculet 20' c Ellwood 35' c Betts 63' c Onojaife 76' c Con: Olver (4/4) 20', 35', 63', 76'; Pen: Olver (2) 28', 80'	Report	Try: Maddison 8' m Slowik 11' c Selway 40' m Beckett 46' c Van Dam 52' c Best 61' c Con: Herron (4/6) 11', 46', 52', 61'; Pen: Herron 72'

Trailfinders Sports Ground
Attendance: 497
Referee: JP Doyle

==== Round 2 ====
17 November 2018
13:00

Richmond	7 – 33	Ealing Trailfinders (1 BP)
Try: McLean 11' c Con: Cook (1/1) 12'	Report	Try: Walker 5' c May 44' c Els 65' m Burns 70' c Harries 75' c Con: May (4/5) 5', 45', 71', 76'

Athletic Ground
Attendance: 387
Referee: Dean Richards

17 November 2018
14:00

Jersey Reds	41 – 10	London Scottish
Try: Selway (3) 9' m, 24' c, 40' m Waters 17' c Macfarlane (2) 69' c, 76' c Con: Penberthy (4/6) 17', 24', 69', 76'; Pen: Penberthy 54'	Report	Try: Hoadley 27' c Con: Perry (1/1) 27'; Pen: Perry 12'

Stade Santander International
Attendance: 1,052
Referee: Matt Turvey

==== Round 3 ====
23 November 2018
19:45

London Scottish	19 – 31	Ealing Trailfinders (1 BP)
Try: Mantella 35' c Obatoyinbo 38' c Eliet 48' m Con: Perry (2/3) 5', 38'	Report	Try: Walker (2) 4' c, 60 m O'Regan 13' c Johnston 21' c Harries 73' m Con: May (3/5) 4', 13', 21'

Athletic Ground
Attendance: 1,041
Referee: Dean Richards

24 November 2018
15:00

(1 BP) Jersey Reds	43 – 21	Richmond
Try: MacFarlane (4) 8' m, 15' m, 24' m, 36' c Mudariki 29' c Beckett 48' c Newey 58' c Con: Penberthy (4/7) 29', 36', 48', 58'	Report	Try: Goodrick-Clarke 40' c Boyce 62' c Penalty try 73'; Con: Gabbitass (1/1) 40'; Adamson (1/1) 62'

Stade Santander International
Attendance: 941
Referee: George Selwood

==== Round 4 ====
1 December 2018
15:00

(1 BP) Ealing Trailfinders	29 – 15	London Scottish
Try: Walker 8' m Harries 14' m Burns (2) 19' m, 52' c Els 35' c Con: May (0/3); Willis (2/2) 35', 52'	Report	Try: Brodley 60' m Barton 75' c Con: Jennings (1/2) 75'; Pen: Perry 2'

Trailfinders Sports Ground
Attendance: 602
Referee: Alexander Thomas

1 December 2018
14:00

Richmond	7 – 38	Jersey Reds (1 BP)
Try: Dennet 57' c Con: Kirby (1/1) 57'	Report	Try: Macfarlane 3' c Penalty try 28'; Herron 34' c Homer 64' c Van Dam 71' m Slowik 78' m Con: Herron (3/5) 4', 34', 64'

Athletic Ground
Attendance: 343
Referee: Adam Leal

==== Round 5 ====
8 December 2018
14:00

(1 BP) Jersey Reds	16 – 20	Ealing Trailfinders
Try: McKern 20' c Con: Penberthy 20'; Pen: Penberthy (2) 30', 45'; Drop: Penberthy 44'	Report	Try: Stegmann 6' c Walker 35' c Con: Willis (2/2) 7', 35'; Pen: Willis (2) 10', 50'

Stade Santander International
Attendance: 943
Referee: Michael Hudson

8 December 2018
15:00

Richmond	10 – 6	London Scottish (1 BP)
Try: Davies 72' c Con: Dennett (1/1) 73'; Pen: Dennett 29'	Report	Pen: Jennings (2) 51', 59'

Athletic Ground
Attendance: 912
Referee: Matt Turvey

==== Round 6 ====
15 December 2018
14:00

(1 BP) Ealing Trailfinders	33 – 0	Richmond
Try: Cornish (3) 16' c, 42' c, 52' m Durutalo 73' c Lundberg 80' c Con: Willis (1/1) 17'; May (3/4) 42', 73', 80'	Report

Trailfinders Sports Ground
Attendance: 591
Referee: Neil Chivers

15 December 2018
14:00

(1 BP) London Scottish	9 – 15	Jersey Reds
Pen: Jennings (3/3) 7', 36', 43'	Report	Try: MacFarlane 39' c Homer 50' m Con: Herron (1/2) 40'; Pen: Herron 61'

Athletic Ground
Attendance: 923
Referee: Dean Richards

=== Group 3 (South West & Midlands) ===
Group 3
	Club	Played	Won	Drawn	Lost	Points For	Points Against	Points Difference	Tries For	Tries Against	Try Bonus	Losing Bonus	Points
1	London Irish (Q)	6	5	0	1	222	72	150	33	10	4	0	24
2	Cornish Pirates (Q)	6	4	0	2	164	164	0	20	20	2	0	18
3	Bedford Blues (Q)	6	3	0	3	131	118	13	19	16	2	1	15
4	Hartpury College	6	0	0	6	80	243	-163	11	35	1	1	2
If teams are level at any stage, tiebreakers are applied in the following order: 1. Number of matches won 2. Total number of tries scored 3. Total number of points for 4. Difference between points for and against 5. Fewest red cards 6. Coin toss
Green background means the club qualified for the quarter-finals as either group winner or best runner-up. Blue background means the club qualified for the quarter-finals as runner up or one of two best 3rd placed sides. Updated: 15 December 2018; Source: "Championship Cup 2018-19". englandrugby.com.

==== Round 1 ====
10 November 2018
13:00

Hartpury College	7 – 35	London Irish (1 BP)
Try: Cochrane 20' c Con: Leeming (1/1) 21'	Report	Try: Fainga'a (2) 3' c, 32' c McKibbin 39' c Hobbs-Awoyemi 59' c Fowlie 80' c Con: Myler (5/5) 4', 32', 39', 59', 80'

Gillman's Ground
Attendance: 705
Referee: Neil Chivers

11 November 2018
14:30

Cornish Pirates	22 – 20	Bedford Blues (1 BP)
Try: Strong 12' c Con: Alvarez (1/1) 13'; Pen: Alvarez (5) 8', 31', 38', 60', 69'	Report	Try: Gliksten 28' c Adamson 46' c Hutler 72' c Con: Coulson (1/3) 29'; Pen: Coulson 34'

Mennaye Field
Attendance: 1,185
Referee: Dean Richards

==== Round 2 ====
16 November 2018
19:45

(1 BP) Bedford Blues	43 – 14	Hartpury College
Try: Penalty try 7'; Tapley 14' c Penny (2) 24' m, 34' c Davies 50' c Blanchet 52' c Con: Robling (4/5) 15', 34', 50', 52'; Pen: Robling 40'+3	Report	Try: Cozens 11' c Gilbert 74' c Con: Cozens (2/2) 12', 74'

Goldington Road
Attendance: 2,148
Referee: George Selwood

18 November 2018
15:00

(1 BP) London Irish	64 – 17	Cornish Pirates
Try: Chawatama 15' c Fowlie 20'c Tonks 38' c Penalty try 48'; Hoskins 57' c Loader 59' c Northcote-Green 65' c Schatz 78' c Nalaga 80' m Con: Myler (6/6) 15', 21', 39', 58', 61', 66'; Atkins (1/2) 78'; Pen: Myler 6'	Report	Try: O'Meara 35' c Walker 76' c Con: Alvarez (2/2) 36', 76'; Pen: Alvarez 42'

Madejski Stadium
Attendance: 2,577
Referee: Alexander Thomas

==== Round 3 ====
25 November 2018
14:30

(1 BP) Cornish Pirates	53 – 17	Hartpury College
Try: Bolwell 30' c O'Meara 35' c Moyle (3) 39' c, 53' m, 63' c Day 43' c Patterson 55' c Con: Alvarez (6/7) 31', 36', 40', 44', 56', 64'; Pen: Alvarez (2) 14', 25'	Report	Try: Stratford 11' c Smith 37' c Con: Cozens (2/2) 12', 38'; Pen: Cozens 28'

Mennaye Field
Attendance: 815
Referee: Neil Chivers

25 November 2018
15:00

London Irish	21 – 13	Bedford Blues
Try: Hoskins 5 c' Steele 22' c Loader 74' c Con: Myler (3/3) 6', 23', 75'	Report	Try: Tapley 2' m Worthington 71' m Con: Robling (0/2); Pen: Robling 35'

Madejski Stadium
Attendance: 1,815
Referee: Matt Turvey

==== Round 4 ====
1 December 2018
14:30

(2 BP) Hartpury College	29 – 36	Cornish Pirates (1 BP)
Try: Eves 10'; Stratford 30'; Caven 53'; Tanner 75' m Con: Scully (3/4) 11', 31', 53'; Pen: Scully 15'	Report	Try: McRae 4' c Alvarez 26' c Koster (2) 37' m, 40' c Wedlake 80' c Con: Alvarez (4/5) 4', 27', 40', 80'; Pen: Alvarez 64'

Gillman's Ground
Attendance: 715
Referee: Matt Turvey

1 December 2018
15:00

Bedford Blues	11 – 36	London Irish (1 BP)
Try: Worthington 6' m Con: Robling (0/1); Pen: Robling (2) 4', 38'	Report	Try: Loader 15' m Ojo 32' m Fainga'a 43' c Porecki 52' m Hepetema 60' c Rogerson 67' c Con: Myler (3/6) 44', 61', 67'

Goldington Road
Attendance: 2,307
Referee: Neil Chivers

==== Round 5 ====
8 December 2018
15:00

(1 BP) Bedford Blues	27 – 17	Cornish Pirates
Try: Tapley 23' c Coulson 25' c Adamson (2) 39' m, 59' m Con: Hooley (2/4) 23', 25'; Pen: Hooley 17'	Report	Try: O'Meara 75' m Wedlake 79' c Koster 80'+5 m Con: O'Meara (0/1); Skinner (1/2) 79'

Goldington Road
Attendance: 1,986
Referee: Alexander Thomas

9 December 2018
15:00

(1 BP) London Irish	59–5	Hartpury College
Try: Porecki (3) 5' m, 37' c, 55' c Hoskins 10' c Steele 17' c McLean (2) 22' m, 50' c Williams 25' c Campbell 59' c Con: Atkins (7/9) 11', 18', 26', 38', 52', 56', 60'	Report	Try: Wilcox 66' m Con: Scully (0/1)

Madejski Stadium
Attendance: 1,760
Referee: Dean Richards

==== Round 6 ====
15 December 2018
14:00

Cornish Pirates	19 – 7	London Irish
Try: Moyle 6' m Andrew 21' c Duncan 51' c Con: Cargill (2/3) 21', 51'	Report	Try: Williams 17' c Con: Myler (1/2) 17'

Mennaye Field
Attendance: 1,104
Referee: George Selwood

15 December 2018
14:00

Hartpury College	8 – 17	Bedford Blues
Try: Edwards 24' m Con: Cozens (0/1); Pen: Cozens (1/1) 56'	Report	Try: Adamson (2) 45' m, 80' m Williams 69' c Con: Hooley (1/3) 69'

Gillman's Ground
Attendance: 571
Referee: Michael Hudson

== Knock-out stage ==
The eight qualifiers were seeded according to performance in the pool stage - with the three pool winners making the top three seeds along with the best runner-up as seed number 4, and the next two runners-up and two best 3rd-placed teams making up the other four seeds. The top four seeds hosted the quarter-finals against the lower seeds, in a 1 v 8, 2 v 7, 3 v 6, 4 v 5 format. However, if two teams qualified from the same pool they could not be drawn together.

Teams were ranked by:

1 – competition points (4 for a win, 2 for a draw)
2 – where competition points are equal, greatest number of wins
3 – where the number of wins are equal, greatest number of tries scored
4 – where the number of tries are equal, aggregate points difference
5 – where the aggregate points difference are equal, greatest number of points scored
6 – where the greatest number of points are equal, least red cards
7 – if red cards are equal, then ranking will be decided by the toss of a coin

Rank	Pool leaders/best runner-up	Pts	Wins	TF	Diff	PF
1	Ealing Trailfinders	26	5	26	82	180
2	London Irish	24	5	33	150	222
3	Yorkshire Carnegie	22	5	20	30	165
4	Jersey Reds	25	5	28	93	194
Rank	Pool runners-up/top two 3rd place	Pts	Wins	TF	Diff	PF
5	Cornish Pirates	18	4	20	0	164
6	Coventry	17	3	26	11	175
7	Bedford Blues	15	3	19	13	131
8	Nottingham	12	2	20	-24	141
9	London Scottish	6	1	7	-63	69

Quarter-finals
2 February 2019
Jersey Reds	13
Cornish Pirates	17
2 February 2019
Ealing Trailfinders	41
Nottingham	10
3 February 2019
London Irish	27
Coventry	17
3 February 2019
Yorkshire Carnegie	38
Bedford Blues	14

Semi-finals
24 February 2019
Ealing Trailfinders	58
Cornish Pirates	26
24 February 2019
London Irish	22
Yorkshire Carnegie	8

Final
4 May 2019
Ealing Trailfinders	23
London Irish	17

=== Quarter-finals ===
2 February 2019
14:00

Jersey Reds	13 – 17	Cornish Pirates
Try: Van Dam 10' c Con: Penberthy (1/1) 10'; Pen: Penberthy (2) 57', 69'	Report	Try: Freeman 63' c Koster 75' c Con: Alvarez (2/2) 63', 75'; Pen: Alvarez 40'

Stade Santander International
Attendance: 1,010
Referee: Christophe Ridley

2 February 2019
14:30

Ealing Trailfinders	41 – 10	Nottingham
Try: Penalty try 22'; Jones 29' c Sloan 50' c Burns 58' c Cornish 75' c Con: May (4/4) 30', 50', 59', 76'; Pen: May 26'; Willis 80'	Report	Try: Williams 61' c Con: O'Leary (1/1) 62'; Pen: O'Leary 8'

Trailfinders Sports Ground
Attendance: 267
Referee: Adam Leal

3 February 2019
15:00

London Irish	27 – 17	Coventry
Try: Elrington 13' c Maddison 19' c Loader 69' c Con: Atkins (3/3) 13', 19', 69'; Pen: Atkins (2) 38', 78'	Report	Try: A. Bulumakau 7' c Nutley 77' c Con: Maisey (2/2) 7', 77'; Pen: Maisey 55'

Madejski Stadium
Attendance: 1,021
Referee: Karl Dickson

3 February 2019
15:00

Yorkshire Carnegie	38 – 14	Bedford Blues
Try: Mayhew (2) 4' c, 80' m Temm 8' m Niko 17' c Elder 35' c Nixon 63' c Con: Umaga (4/6) 4', 17', 35', 63'	Report	Try: Hutler 59' c Tapley 68' c Con: Robling (2/2) 59, 68'

Emerald Headingley Stadium
Attendance: 365
Referee: Craig Maxwell-Keys

=== Semi-finals ===
24 February 2019
13:00

London Irish	22 – 8	Yorkshire Carnegie
Try: Loader (2) 7' c, 39' m Porecki 49' c Con: Atkins (2/3) 8', 50'; Pen: Atkins 77'	Report	Try: Thoroughgood 21' m Con: Te Rure (0/1); Pen: Te Rure 24'

Madejski Stadium
Attendance: 1,208
Referee: Simon Harding

24 February 2019
15:00

Ealing Trailfinders	58 – 26	Cornish Pirates
Try: Burns (4) 11' m, 23' c, 68' m, 80' m Cordy Redden 30' c, 40' m Sloan 43' c Johnston 54' c Smid 62' m Con: May (4/7) 23', 30', 43', 54'; Willis (0/2); Pen: May 35'	Report	Try: Frost 2' c O'Meara (2) 7' c, 46' m Wedlake 20' c Con: Skinner (3/4) 2', 7', 20'

Trailfinders Sports Ground
Attendance: 450
Referee: Dean Richards

=== Final ===
4 May 2019
16:30

Ealing Trailfinders	23 – 17	London Irish
Try: Steggman 11' m Harries 20' m Johnston 46' c Con: Willis (1/3) 46'; Pen: Willis (2) 34', 59'	Ealing; Irish	Try: Loader 28' m Hepetema 68' c Con: Myler (2/3) 28', 68'; Pen: Myler 37'

Trailfinders Sports Club
Attendance: 3,627
Referee: Greg MacDonald

== Attendances ==
Club	Home matches	Total	Average	Highest	Lowest	% Capacity
Bedford Blues	3	6,441	2,147	2,307	1,986	43%
Cornish Pirates	3	3,104	1,035	1,185	815	26%
Coventry	3	5,618	1,873	2,028	1,686	47%
Doncaster Knights	3	2,409	803	894	648	16%
Ealing Trailfinders	6	6,034	1,006	3,627	267	28%
Hartpury College	3	1,991	664	715	571	33%
Jersey Reds	4	3,946	987	1,052	941	25%
London Irish	5	8,381	1,676	2,577	1,021	7%
London Scottish	3	3,357	1,119	1,393	923	25%
Nottingham	3	2,403	801	913	635	27%
Richmond	3	1,642	547	912	343	12%
Yorkshire Carnegie	4	2,024	506	750	324	15%

== Individual statistics ==
- Points scorers includes tries as well as conversions, penalties and drop goals. Appearance figures also include coming on as substitutes (unused substitutes not included).

=== Top points scorers ===
Rank	Player	Team	Appearances	Points
1	(Argentina) Javier Rojas Alvarez	Cornish Pirates	7	65
2	(England) Jacob Umaga	Yorkshire Carnegie	6	63
3	(England) Will Maisey	Coventry	7	49
4	(England) Laurence May	Ealing Trailfinders	7	47
5	(England) Stephen Myler	London Irish	6	46
6	(Scotland) Jack Macfarlane	Jersey Reds	5	40
6	(England) Jordan Burns	Ealing Trailfinders	8	40
7	(England) Aaron Penberthy	Jersey Reds	4	38
8	(England) Ben Loader	London Irish	6	35
9	(England) Jacob Atkins	London Irish	6	29
9	(Scotland) Craig Willis	Ealing Trailfinders	8	29

=== Top try scorers ===
Rank	Player	Team	Appearances	Tries
1	(Scotland) Jack Macfarlane	Jersey Reds	5	8
1	(England) Jordan Burns	Ealing Trailfinders	8	8
2	(England) Ben Loader	London Irish	6	7
3	(England) Dean Adamson	Bedford Blues	6	5
3	(England) Max Trimble	Coventry	6	5
3	(England) Alex O'Meara	Cornish Pirates	8	5
3	(Australia) Dave Porecki	London Irish	8	5
3	(Scotland) Alun Walker	Ealing Trailfinders	8	5
4	(New Zealand) Dan Koster	Cornish Pirates	4	4
4	(England) Pat Tapley	Bedford Blues	4	4
4	(Wales) Will Harries	Ealing Trailfinders	6	4
4	(England) Kyle Moyle	Cornish Pirates	6	4
4	(England) Nick Selway	Jersey Reds	6	4
4	(Scotland) Junior Bulumakau	Coventry	7	4
4	(England) Chris Elder	Yorkshire Carnegie	7	4
4	(England) Matt Cornish	Ealing Trailfinders	9	4

== Season records ==
=== Team ===
Largest home win — 54 points

59 – 5 London Irish at home to Hartpury College on 9 December 2018

Largest away win — 31 points

38 – 7 Jersey Reds away to Richmond on 1 December 2018

Most points scored — 64

64 – 17 London Irish at home to Cornish Pirates on 18 November 2018

Most tries in a match — 9 (3)

London Irish at home to Cornish Pirates on 18 November 2018
London Irish at home to Hartpury College on 9 December 2018
Ealing Trailfinders at home to Cornish Pirates on 24 February 2019

Most conversions in a match — 7 (2)

London Irish at home to Cornish Pirates on 18 November 2018
London Irish at home to Hartpury College on 9 December 2018

Most penalties in a match — 5

Cornish Pirates at home to Bedford Blues on 11 November 2018

Most drop goals in a match — 1

Jersey Reds at home to Ealing Trailfinders on 8 December 2018

=== Player ===
Most points in a match — 20 (2)

(Scotland) Jack Macfarlane for Jersey Reds at home to Richmond on 24 November 2018
(England) Jordan Burns for Ealing Trailfinders at home to Cornish Pirates on 24 February 2019

Most tries in a match — 4 (2)

(Scotland) Jack Macfarlane for Jersey Reds at home to Richmond on 24 November 2018
(England) Jordan Burns for Ealing Trailfinders at home to Cornish Pirates on 24 February 2019

Most conversions in a match — 7

(England) Jacob Atkins for London Irish at home to Hartpury College on 9 December 2018

Most penalties in a match — 5

(Argentina) Javier Rojas Alvarez for Cornish Pirates at home to Bedford Blues on 11 November 2018

Most drop goals in a match — 1

(England) Aaron Penberthy for Jersey Reds at home to Ealing Trailfinders on 8 December 2018

=== Attendances ===
Highest — 3,627

Ealing Trailfinders at home to London Irish on 4 May 2019

Lowest — 267

Ealing Trailfinders at home to Nottingham on 2 February 2019

Highest average attendance — 2,147

Bedford Blues

Lowest average attendance — 506

Yorkshire Carnegie

== See also ==
- RFU Championship
- British and Irish Cup
- 2018–19 Premiership Rugby Cup
- English rugby union system
- List of English rugby union teams
- Rugby union in England
