= 2017–18 British and Irish Cup =

Tournament details
- Countries: England; Ireland; Wales
- Tournament format(s): Round-robin and knockout
- Date: 13 October 2017 — April 2018

Tournament statistics
- Teams: 20
- Matches played: 67
- Attendance: 70,827 (1,057 per match)
- Highest attendance: 7,428; Bristol v Doncaster Knights (22 October 2017)
- Lowest attendance: 50; Scarlets PS v Ulster A (20 January 2018)
- Tries scored: 454 (6.78 per match)
- Top point scorer(s): (South Africa) Brendan Cope (Jersey) (England) Luke Daniels (Ealing); 83 points each
- Top try scorer(s): (England) James Cordy-Redden (Ealing) (Wales) Will Harries (Ealing); 7 tries each

Final
- Venue: Trailfinders Sports Ground
- Attendance: 1,386
- Champions: Ealing Trailfinders (1st title)
- Runners-up: Leinster A

The 2017–18 British and Irish Cup is the ninth and final season of the annual rugby union competition for second tier, semi-professional clubs from Britain and Ireland. Munster A are the defending champions having won the 2016–17 final against Jersey Reds 29–28 at Irish Independent Park, Cork on 21 April 2017. The format of the competition is similar to last season with Scottish clubs not competing. For the third consecutive season the four Welsh teams are the reserve sides of the teams competing in the Pro14 competition instead of clubs from the Welsh Premier Division.

== Competition format ==
The competition format is a pool stage followed by a knockout stage. The pool stage consists of five pools of four teams playing home and away matches. The top side in each pool, plus the three best runners-up, progress to the knockout stage. The eight quarter-finalists are ranked, with top four teams having home advantage. The four winning quarter-finalists progress to the semi-final draw. Most of the matches are played on the same weekends as the European Champions Cup and European Challenge Cup. First round matches begin on 13 October 2017 and the final will be held in April 2018.

== Participating teams and locations ==
The allocation of teams is as follows:

- (England) – twelve clubs from RFU Championship
- (Ireland) – four Irish provinces represented by 'A' teams
- (Wales) – four Welsh regions represented by Premiership Select teams.
Locations of the 2017-18 British & Irish Cup teams

Club	Country	League	Stadium	Capacity	Area
Bedford Blues	England	RFU Championship	Goldington Road	5,000 (1,700 seats)	Bedford
Bristol	England	RFU Championship	Ashton Gate	27,000	Bristol
Cardiff Blues Premiership Select	Wales	N/A	Sardis Road	7,861	Pontypridd
Connacht Eagles	Ireland	Irish Interprovincial	Galway Sportsgrounds; Corinthian Park	8,100; 1,000	Galway; Galway
Cornish Pirates	England	RFU Championship	Mennaye Field	4,000	Penzance
Doncaster Knights	England	RFU Championship	Castle Park	5,000	Doncaster
Dragons Premiership Select	Wales	N/A	CCB Centre; Bridge Field	1,000; 2,000	Ystrad Mynach; Bedwas
Ealing Trailfinders	England	RFU Championship	Trailfinders Sports Ground	3,020	West Ealing, London
Hartpury College	England	RFU Championship	College Stadium	2,000	Hartpury
Jersey Reds	(Jersey) England (Note: Jersey is listed in the English section because they play in the English RFU Championship.)	RFU Championship	St. Peter	4,000	Saint Peter
Leinster A	Ireland	Irish Interprovincial	Donnybrook Stadium	6,000	Dublin
London Scottish	England	RFU Championship	Richmond Athletic Ground	4,500 (1,000 seats)	Richmond, London
Munster A	Ireland	Irish Interprovincial	Irish Independent Park	8,008	Cork
Nottingham Rugby	England	RFU Championship	Lady Bay Sports Ground	3,000	Nottingham
Ospreys Premiership Select	Wales	N/A	St Helen's; The Gnoll; Talbot Athletic Ground	4,500; 5,000; 3,000	Swansea; Neath; Port Talbot
Richmond	England	RFU Championship	Richmond Athletic Ground	4,500	Richmond, London
Rotherham Titans	England	RFU Championship	Clifton Lane	2,500	Rotherham
Scarlets Premiership Select	Wales	N/A	Parc y Scarlets; Talbot Athletic Ground; Church Bank Playing Fields	14,870; 3,000; 3,000	Llanelli; Aberavon; Llandovery
Ulster A	Ireland	Irish Interprovincial	Rifle Park; Eaton Park; Shaw's Bridge	1,000; 1,000; 1,300	Banbridge; Ballymena; Belfast
Yorkshire Carnegie	England	RFU Championship	Stacks Field; Laund Hill; Silver Royd	2,000; 2,000; 1,950	Ilkley; Huddersfield; Scalby

== Pool stages ==
Key to colours
Winner of each pool, advance to quarter-finals.
Three highest-scoring second-place teams advance to quarter-finals.

(Q) denotes the team has qualified for the quarter-finals as the pool winners
(q) denotes team has at least qualified for the quarter-finals as one of the three highest-scoring second-place teams

=== Pool 1 ===
Team	Pld	W	D	L	PF	PA	PD	TB	LB	Pts	Qualification
(England) Bedford Blues (Q)	6	5	0	1	165	102	+63	3	1	24	Qualified as pool winner
(Ireland) Munster A (Q)	6	5	0	1	136	62	+74	1	0	21	Qualified
(England) Nottingham	6	2	0	4	103	157	−54	2	1	11	
(Wales) Ospreys Premiership Select	6	0	0	6	69	152	−83	0	2	2	

Updated to match(es) played on 9 March 2018. Source:
Rules for classification: 4 points for a win; 2 points for a draw; 1 bonus point for a loss by seven points or less; 1 bonus point for scoring four or more tries in a match

==== Round 1 ====
14 October 2017
14:30

Ospreys Premiership Select	6–24	Munster A
	Report

St Helen's, Swansea
Attendance: 547
Referee: Fergus Kirby

15 October 2017
15:00

(BP) Nottingham	26–38	Bedford Blues (BP)
	Report

Lady Bay Sports Ground
Attendance: 1,091
Referee: Hamish Smales

==== Round 2 ====
20 October 2017
19:45

(BP) Munster A	38–7	Nottingham
	Report

Irish Independent Park
Attendance: 200
Referee: Craig Evans

21 October 2017
15:00

(BP) Bedford Blues	43–19	Ospreys Premiership Select
	Report

Goldington Road
Attendance: 2,360
Referee: Johnny Erskine

==== Round 3 ====
8 December 2017
19:45

Munster A	14–25	Bedford Blues
	Report

Irish Independent Park
Attendance: 200
Referee: Dudley Phillips

10 December 2017
15:00

Nottingham	P–P	Ospreys Premiership Select

- Game postponed due to bad weather (snow). Game to be rescheduled for 9 March 2018.

==== Round 4 ====
16 December 2017
14:30

(BP) Ospreys Premiership Select	15 – 17	Nottingham
	Report

The Gnoll, Neath
Attendance: 364
Referee: Robert O'Sullivan

16 December 2017
15:00

(BP) Bedford Blues	12 – 16	Munster A
	Report

Goldington Road
Attendance: 2,206
Referee: Elgan Williams

==== Round 5 ====
12 January 2018
19:30

(BP) Ospreys Premiership Select	12 – 15	Bedford Blues
	Report

Talbot Athletic Ground, Port Talbot
Attendance: 584
Referee: Robert Sullivan

12 January 2018
19:45

(BP) Nottingham	12 – 17	Munster A
	Report

Lady Bay Sports Ground
Attendance: 923
Referee: Aled Evans

==== Round 6 ====
19 January 2018
19:45

Munster A	27 – 0	Ospreys Premiership Select
	Report

Irish Independent Park
Attendance: 341
Referee: Neil Chivers

20 January 2018
14:00

(BP) Bedford Blues	32 – 15	Nottingham
	Report

Goldington Road
Attendance: 1,912
Referee: Hamish Smales

==== Round 3 (rescheduled game) ====
9 March 2018
19:45

(BP) Nottingham	26 – 17	Ospreys Premiership Select

Lady Bay Sports Ground
Attendance: 750
Referee: Neil Chivers

- Game rescheduled from 10 December 2017.

=== Pool 2 ===
Team	Pld	W	D	L	PF	PA	PD	TB	LB	Pts	Qualification
(Ireland) Leinster A (Q)	6	5	0	1	235	141	+94	6	0	26	Qualified as pool winner
(England) Doncaster Knights (Q)	6	4	0	2	231	167	+64	5	1	22	Qualified
(England) Bristol	6	3	0	3	208	168	+40	4	0	16	
(Wales) Cardiff Blues Premiership Select	6	0	0	6	83	281	−198	2	0	2	

Updated to match(es) played on 21 January 2018. Source:
Rules for classification: 4 points for a win; 2 points for a draw; 1 bonus point for a loss by seven points or less; 1 bonus point for scoring four or more tries in a match

==== Round 1 ====
14 October 2017
14:30

Cardiff Blues Premiership Select	7–31	Bristol (BP)
	Report

Sardis Road
Attendance: 2,225
Referee: Johnny Erskine

14 October 2017
14:30

Doncaster Knights	17–41	Leinster A (BP)
	Report

Castle Park
Attendance: 1,173
Referee: Aled Evans

==== Round 2 ====
21 October 2017
19:30

(BP) Leinster A	29–10	Cardiff Blues Premiership Select
	Report

Donnybrook
Attendance: 1,659
Referee: Karl Dickson

22 October 2017
14:00

Bristol	22–33	Doncaster Knights (BP)
	Report

Ashton Gate
Attendance: 7,428
Referee: Adam Leal

==== Round 3 ====
8 December 2017
19:45

(BP) Bristol	35–46	Leinster A (BP)
	Report

Ashton Gate
Attendance: 6,254
Referee: Gareth John

9 December 2017
14:30

(BP) Doncaster Knights	70–12	Cardiff Blues Premiership Select
	Report

Castle Park
Attendance: 875
Referee: Johnny Erskine

==== Round 4 ====
15 December 2017
19:30

(BP) Leinster A	50 – 15	Bristol
	Report

Donnybrook
Attendance: 1,400
Referee: Adam Jones

16 December 2017
14:30

(BP) Cardiff Blues Premiership Select	27 – 42	Doncaster Knights (BP)
	Report

Sardis Road
Attendance: 200
Referee: Anthony Woodthorpe

==== Round 5 ====
13 January 2018
14:30

(BP) Cardiff Blues Premiership Select	27 – 41	Leinster A (BP)
	Report

Sardis Road
Attendance: 213
Referee: Adam Leal

13 January 2018
14:30

(2BP) Doncaster Knights	32 – 37	Bristol (BP)
	Report

Castle Park
Attendance: 979
Referee: Karl Dickson

==== Round 6 ====
19 January 2018
19:45

(BP) Bristol	68 – 0	Cardiff Blues Premiership Select
	Report

Ashton Gate
Attendance: 6,150
Referee: Robert O'Sullivan

20 January 2018
14:00

(BP) Leinster A	28 – 37	Doncaster Knights (BP)
	Report

Donnybrook
Attendance: 786
Referee: Mike English

=== Pool 3 ===
Team	Pld	W	D	L	PF	PA	PD	TB	LB	Pts	Qualification
Jersey Reds (Q)	6	5	0	1	215	85	+130	5	1	26	Qualified as pool winner
(England) Yorkshire Carnegie	6	4	0	2	130	127	+3	3	0	19	
(England) London Scottish	6	3	0	3	119	170	−51	3	0	15	
(Wales) Dragons Premiership Select	6	0	0	6	109	191	−82	1	3	4	

Updated to match(es) played on 20 January 2018. Source:
Rules for classification: 4 points for a win; 2 points for a draw; 1 bonus point for a loss by seven points or less; 1 bonus point for scoring four or more tries in a match

==== Round 1 ====
13 October 2017
19:45

(BP) Jersey Reds	32–3	Yorkshire Carnegie
	Report

St Peter
Attendance: 1,216
Referee: Anthony Woodthorpe

14 October 2017
15:00

(BP) London Scottish	27–20	Dragons Premiership Select (BP)
	Report

Athletic Ground
Attendance: 808
Referee: Rob O'Sullivan

==== Round 2 ====
21 October 2017
14:30

Dragons Premiership Select	7–34	Jersey Reds (BP)
	Report

CCB Centre
Attendance: 110
Referee: Nigel Correll

22 October 2017
15:00

Yorkshire Carnegie	19–8	London Scottish

Stacks Field, Ilkley
Attendance: 650
Referee: Sara Cox

==== Round 3 ====
9 December 2017
13:30

(BP) Yorkshire Carnegie	43–22	Dragons Premiership Select (BP)

Laund Hill, Huddersfield
Attendance: 200
Referee: Michael Hudson

9 December 2017
15:00

(BP) Jersey Reds	45–10	London Scottish
	Report

St Peter
Attendance: 712
Referee: Jack Makepeace

==== Round 4 ====
16 December 2017
14:00

London Scottish	18 – 45	Jersey Reds (BP)
	Report

Athletic Ground
Attendance: 768
Referee: Fergus Kirby

16 December 2017
15:00

(BP) Dragons Premiership Select	14 – 20	Yorkshire Carnegie

CCB Centre
Attendance: 213
Referee: Johnny Erskine

==== Round 5 ====
12 January 2018
19:45

(BP) Jersey Reds	40 – 21	Dragons Premiership Select
	Report

St Peter
Attendance: 1,186
Referee: Johnny Erskine

13 January 2018
15:00

(BP) London Scottish	29 – 19	Yorkshire Carnegie
	Report

Athletic Ground
Attendance: 879
Referee: Anthony Woodthorpe

==== Round 6 ====
20 January 2018
14:00

(BP) Dragons Premiership Select	22 – 27	London Scottish (BP)
	Report

The Bridge Field, Bedwas
Attendance: 500
Referee: Nigel Correll

20 January 2018
14:00

(BP) Yorkshire Carnegie	26 – 19	Jersey Reds (BP)

Silver Royd, Scalby
Attendance: 521
Referee: Jack Makepeace

=== Pool 4 ===
Team	Pld	W	D	L	PF	PA	PD	TB	LB	Pts	Qualification
(England) Ealing Trailfinders (Q)	6	6	0	0	320	67	+253	6	0	30	Qualified as pool winner
(England) Rotherham Titans	6	3	0	3	120	151	−31	1	0	13	
(Ireland) Connacht Eagles	6	2	0	4	146	228	−82	2	1	11	
(England) Richmond	6	1	0	5	81	221	−140	1	0	5	

Updated to match(es) played on 20 January 2018. Source:
Rules for classification: 4 points for a win; 2 points for a draw; 1 bonus point for a loss by seven points or less; 1 bonus point for scoring four or more tries in a match

==== Round 1 ====
14 October 2017
14:00

Rotherham Titans	28–23	Connacht Eagles (BP)
	Report

Clifton Lane
Attendance: 417
Referee: Elgan Williams

14 October 2017
15:00

(BP) Ealing Trailfinders	67–12	Richmond
	Report

Trailfinders Sports Ground
Attendance: 647
Referee: Sara Cox

==== Round 2 ====
21 October 2017
15:00

(BP) Richmond	35–5	Rotherham Titans
	Report

Athletic Ground
Attendance: 623
Referee: Mike Hudson

22 October 2017
14:00

Connacht Eagles	14–71	Ealing Trailfinders (BP)
	Report

Galway Sportsgrounds
Attendance: 250
Referee: Rhys Thomas

==== Round 3 ====
9 December 2017
14:00

Rotherham Titans	10–45	Ealing Trailfinders (BP)
	Report

Clifton Lane
Attendance: 289
Referee: Fergus Kirby

9 December 2017
15:00

Richmond	17–38	Connacht Eagles (BP)
	Report

Athletic Ground
Attendance: 583
Referee: Sara Cox

==== Round 4 ====
16 December 2017
15:00

(BP) Ealing Trailfinders	35 – 9	Rotherham Titans
	Report

Trailfinders Sports Ground
Attendance: 407
Referee: Karl Dickson

17 December 2017
14:00

(BP) Connacht Eagles	56 – 7	Richmond
	Report

Galway Sportsgrounds
Attendance: 350
Referee: Chris Busby

==== Round 5 ====
13 January 2018
14:30

Rotherham Titans	31 – 10	Richmond
	Report

Clifton Lane
Attendance: 227
Referee: Mike Hudson

13 January 2018
15:00

(BP) Ealing Trailfinders	78 – 12	Connacht Eagles
	Report

Trailfinders Sports Ground
Attendance: 584
Referee: Dewi Phillips

==== Round 6 ====
19 January 2018
19:00

Connacht Eagles	3 – 27	Rotherham Titans (BP)
	Report

Corinthian Park
Attendance: 601
Referee: Chris Busby

20 January 2018
14:00

Richmond	0 – 24	Ealing Trailfinders (BP)
	Report

Athletic Ground
Attendance: 420
Referee: Christophe Ridley

=== Pool 5 ===
Team	Pld	W	D	L	PF	PA	PD	TB	LB	Pts	Qualification
(Ireland) Ulster A (Q)	6	5	0	1	143	111	+32	3	0	23	Qualified as pool winner
(England) Cornish Pirates (Q)	6	4	0	2	162	86	+76	3	0	19	Qualified
(Wales) Scarlets Premiership Select	6	2	0	4	107	158	−51	1	1	10	
(England) Hartpury College	6	1	0	5	124	180	−56	2	2	8	

Updated to match(es) played on 3 February 2018. Source:
Rules for classification: 4 points for a win; 2 points for a draw; 1 bonus point for a loss by seven points or less; 1 bonus point for scoring four or more tries in a match

==== Round 1 ====
14 October 2017
14:30

Hartpury College	19–35	Cornish Pirates (BP)
	Report

College Stadium
Attendance: 732
Referee: Joy Neville

14 October 2017
14:30

Ulster A	24–18	Scarlets Premiership Select (BP)
	Report

Rifle Park, Banbridge
Attendance: 600
Referee: Karl Dickson

==== Round 2 ====
21 October 2017
14:30

Scarlets Premiership Select	24–21	Hartpury College (BP)
	Report

Parc y Scarlets, Llanelli
Attendance: 100
Referee: James Clarke

22 October 2017
14:30

Cornish Pirates	23–14	Ulster A
	Report

Mennaye Field
Attendance: 1,074
Referee: Mike English

==== Round 3 ====
9 December 2017
14:30

(2BP) Hartpury College	24–29	Ulster A (BP)
	Report

College Stadium
Attendance: 375
Referee: Karl Dickson

11 December 2017
17:15

Scarlets Premiership Select	18–10	Cornish Pirates
	Report

Talbot Athletic Ground, Aberavon (Note: Game was originally to be held on 10 December 2017 at Carmarthen Park, Carmarthen but due to safety concerns caused by bad weather (snow) the date and venue was changed.)
Attendance: 300
Referee: Aled Evans

==== Round 4 ====
16 December 2017
14:30

(BP) Ulster A	27 – 19	Hartpury College
	Report

Eaton Park, Ballymena
Attendance: 450
Referee: Hamish Smales

17 December 2017
14:30

(BP) Cornish Pirates	38 – 10	Scarlets Premiership Select
	Report

Mennaye Field
Attendance: 916
Referee: Adam Leal

==== Round 5 ====
12 January 2018
17:00

(BP) Ulster A	25 – 14	Cornish Pirates
	Report

Shaw's Bridge, Belfast
Attendance: 781
Referee: Elgan Williams

13 January 2018
14:30

(BP) Hartpury College	41 – 24	Scarlets Premiership Select (BP)
	Report

College Stadium
Attendance: 736
Referee: Sara Cox

==== Round 6 ====
20 January 2018
14:00

Cornish Pirates	P – P	Hartpury College

Mennaye Field

- Game postponed due to unplayable pitch caused by bad weather (rain). Game to be rescheduled for 3 February 2018.

20 January 2018
14:00

Scarlets Premiership Select	13 – 24	Ulster A
	Report

Church Bank Playing Fields, Llandovery
Attendance: 50
Referee: Fergal Kirby

=== Round 6 (rescheduled game) ===
3 February 2018
14:00

Hartpury College	0 – 41	Cornish Pirates (BP)
	Report

College Stadium (Note: Game was originally to be held at Cornish Pirates home ground - the Mennaye Field - but as rain had made the pitch unplayable, and was forecast all weekend, the RFU decided to switch the game to Hartpury's home ground rather than allow the Pirates to play at home on a later date.)
Attendance: 275
Referee: Aled Evans

- Game rescheduled from 20 January 2018.

== Knock-out stage ==
The eight qualifiers are seeded according to performance in the pool stage. The four top seeds hosted the quarter-finals against the lower seeds, in a 1 v 8, 2 v 7, 3 v 6 and 4 v 5 format. However, if two teams qualify from the same group they can not be drawn together. Therefore, Leinster A cannot be drawn against Doncaster Knights. Teams are ranked by:

1 – competition points (4 for a win, 2 for a draw)
2 – where competition points are equal, greatest number of wins
3 – where the number of wins are equal, aggregate points difference
4 – where the aggregate points difference are equal, greatest number of points scored

Seed	Pool winners	Pts	Wins	Pts diff
1	(England) Ealing Trailfinders (Q)	30	6	253
2	Jersey Reds (Q)	26	5	130
3	(Ireland) Leinster A (Q)	26	5	94
4	(England) Bedford Blues	24	5	63
5	(Ireland) Ulster A	23	5	32
Seed	Pool Runners–up	Pts	Wins	Pts diff
6	(England) Doncaster Knights	22	4	64
7	(Ireland) Munster A	21	4	74
8	(England) Cornish Pirates	19	4	76
9	(England) Yorkshire Carnegie	19	4	3
10	(England) Rotherham Titans	13	-31	−58

Quarter-finals
31 March 2018 - Trailfinders Sports Ground
(England) Ealing Trailfinders	28
(England) Cornish Pirates	25
31 March 2018 - Goldington Road
(England) Bedford Blues	16
(Ireland) Ulster A	10
30 March 2018 - St. Peter
Jersey Reds	22
(England) Doncaster Knights	19
30 March 2018 - Donnybrook
(Ireland) Leinster A	17
(Ireland) Munster A	6

Semi-finals
21 April 2018 - Trailfinders Sports Ground
(England) Ealing Trailfinders	36
(England) Bedford Blues	16
21 April 2018 - St. Peter
Jersey Reds	27
(Ireland) Leinster A	29

Final
May 2018 - Trailfinders Sports Ground
(England) Ealing Trailfinders	22
(Ireland) Leinster A	7

=== Quarter-finals ===
30 March 2018
15:00

Jersey Reds	22 – 10	(England) Doncaster Knights
	Report

St Peter
Attendance: 1,679
Referee: Joy Neville

30 March 2018
15:00

Leinster A (Ireland)	17 – 6	(Ireland) Munster A
	Report

Donnybrook
Attendance: 1,405
Referee: Karl Dickson

31 March 2018
15:00

Bedford Blues (England)	16 – 10	(Ireland) Ulster A
	Report

Goldington Road
Attendance: 2,323
Referee: Mike English

31 March 2018
15:00

Ealing Trailfinders (England)	28 – 25	(England) Cornish Pirates
	Report

Trailfinders Sports Ground
Attendance: 757
Referee: Christophe Ridley

=== Semi-finals ===
21 April 2018
15:00

Ealing Trailfinders (England)	36 – 16	(England) Bedford Blues
	Report

Trailfinders Sports Ground
Attendance: 1,070
Referee: Christophe Ridley

21 April 2018
15:00

Jersey Reds	27 – 29	(Ireland) Leinster A
	Report

St Peter
Attendance: 1,837
Referee: Ian Davies

=== Final ===
12 May 2018
14:00

Ealing Trailfinders (England)	22–7	(Ireland) Leinster A
	Report

Trailfinders Sports Ground
Attendance: 1,386
Referee: Craig Evans

== Attendances ==
Club	Home matches	Total	Average	Highest	Lowest	% Capacity
(England) Bedford Blues	4	8,801	2,200	2,360	1,912	44%
(England) Bristol	3	19,832	6,611	7,428	6,150	24%
(Wales) Cardiff Blues Premiership Select	3	2,638	879	2,225	200	11%
(Ireland) Connacht Eagles	3	1,201	400	601	250	23%
(England) Cornish Pirates (Note: Cornish Pirates only played 2 pool games at home as their final match against Hartpury College, originally at home, was switched to Hartpury's ground as the Pirates pitch was unplayable due to rain.)	2	1,990	995	1,074	916	25%
(England) Doncaster Knights	3	3,027	1,009	1,173	875	20%
(Wales) Dragons Premiership Select	3	823	274	500	110	19%
(England) Ealing Trailfinders	6	4,851	809	1,386	407	27%
(England) Hartpury College (Note: Hartpury College played 4 pool games at home as their final match against Cornish Pirates, originally away, was switched to a home game as the Pirates pitch was unplayable due to rain.)	4	2,118	530	736	275	26%
Jersey Reds	5	6,630	1,326	1,837	712	33%
(Ireland) Leinster A	4	5,250	1,313	1,659	786	22%
(England) London Scottish	3	2,455	818	879	768	18%
(Ireland) Munster A	3	741	247	341	200	3%
(England) Nottingham	3	2,764	921	1,091	750	31%
(Wales) Ospreys Premiership Select	3	1,495	498	584	364	13%
(England) Richmond	3	1,626	542	623	420	12%
(England) Rotherham Titans	3	933	311	417	227	12%
(Wales) Scarlets Premiership Select	3	450	150	300	50	4%
(Ireland) Ulster A	3	1,831	610	781	450	55%
(England) Yorkshire Carnegie	3	1,371	457	650	200	23%

== Individual statistics ==
- Points scorers includes tries as well as conversions, penalties and drop goals. Appearance figures also include coming on as substitutes (unused substitutes not included).

=== Top points scorers ===
Rank	Player	Team	Appearances	Points
1	(South Africa) Brendan Cope	Jersey Reds	8	83
1	(England) Luke Daniels	Ealing Trailfinders	8	83
2	(Ireland) Bill Johnston	Munster A	7	48
3	(United States) Will Hooley	Bedford Blues	6	46
4	(England) Will Cargill	Cornish Pirates	6	45
5	(Ireland) Ciaran Frawley	Leinster A	8	43
6	(Ireland) Cathal Marsh	Leinster A	5	42
7	(England) Simon Humberstone	Doncaster Knights	4	39
8	(Wales) Will Harries	Ealing Trailfinders	5	35
8	(England) James Cordy-Redden	Ealing Trailfinders	6	35

=== Top try scorers ===
Rank	Player	Team	Appearances	Tries
1	(Wales) Will Harries	Ealing Trailfinders	5	7
1	(England) James Cordy-Redden	Ealing Trailfinders	7	7
2	(Ireland) Adam McBurney	Ulster A	5	6
2	(England) Darryl Dyer	Hartpury College	6	6
2	(England) Lewis Jones	Ealing Trailfinders	7	6
2	(Scotland) Alun Walker	Ealing Trailfinders	7	6
2	(England) Nick Selway	Jersey Reds	8	6
3	(England) Chris Elder	Yorkshire Carnegie	2	5
3	(England) Dean Adamson	Bedford Blues	7	5
3	(England) Luke Daniels	Ealing Trailfinders	8	5

== Season records ==
=== Team ===
- Largest home win — 68 points: 68-0 Bristol at home to Cardiff Blues Premiership Select on 19 January 2018
- Largest away win — 57 points: 71-14 Ealing Trailfinders away to Connacht Eagles on 22 October 2017
- Most points scored — 78 points: 78-12 Ealing Trailfinders at home to Connacht Eagles on 13 January 2018
- Most tries in a match — 12: Ealing Trailfinders at home to Connacht Eagles on 13 January 2018
- Most conversions in a match — 9 (3):
  - Doncaster Knights at home to Cardiff Blues Premiership Select on 9 December 2017
  - Ealing Trailfinders at home to Connacht Eagles on 13 January 2018
  - Bristol at home to Cardiff Blues Premiership Select on 19 January 2018
- Most penalties in a match — 4 (4):
  - Nottingham away to Ospreys Premiership Select on 16 December 2017
  - Ospreys Premiership Select at home to Bedford Blues on 12 January 2018
  - Rotherham Titans at home to Richmond on 13 January 2018
  - Jersey Reds away to Yorkshire Carnegie on 20 January 2018
- Most drop goals in a match — 0

=== Player ===
- Most points in a match — 20 (2):
  - (Ireland) Adam McBurney for Ulster A at home to Hartpury College on 16 December 2017
  - (South Africa) Brendan Cope for Jersey Reds away to London Scottish on 16 December 2017
- Most tries in a match — 4: (Ireland) Adam McBurney for Ulster A at home to Hartpury College on 16 December 2017
- Most conversions in a match — 9 (2):
  - (England) Simon Humberstone for Doncaster Knights at home to Cardiff Blues Premiership Select on 9 December 2017
  - (England) Luke Daniels for Ealing Trailfinders at home to Connacht Eagles on 13 January 2018
- Most penalties in a match — 4 (3):
  - (England) Tiff Eden for Nottingham away to Ospreys Premiership Select on 16 December 2017
  - (Wales) Luke Price for Ospreys Premiership Select at home to Bedford Blues on 12 January 2018
  - (Scotland) Lee Millar for Rotherham Titans at home to Richmond on 13 January 2018
  - (South Africa) Brendan Cope for Jersey Reds away to Yorkshire Carnegie on 20 January 2018
- Most drop goals in a match — 0

=== Attendances ===
- Highest — 7,428: Bristol at home to Doncaster Knights on 22 October 2017
- Lowest — 50: Scarlets Premiership Select at home to Ulster A on 20 January 2018
- Highest Average Attendance — 6,611: Bristol
- Lowest Average Attendance — 150: Scarlets Premiership Select
