= 2019 Super League season results =

Rugby league competition results

The 2019 Super League XXIV season was the 24th season of Super League, and 125th season of rugby league in Great Britain. The Super League XXIV commenced on 31 January 2019, and ended on 12 October 2019. It consisted of 29 regular season games, and 4 rounds of play-offs, which included the Grand Final at Old Trafford. The fixture list was released on 6 November 2018.

== Fixtures And Results ==
=== Round 1 ===
Home	Score	Away	Match Information
Home	Score	Away	Date and Time	Venue	Referee	Attendance
St. Helens	22–12	Wigan Warriors	31 January 2019, 19:45	Totally Wicked Stadium	Robert Hicks	16,508
Castleford Tigers	20–4	Catalans Dragons	1 February 2019, 19:45	Mend-A-Hose Jungle	James Child	7,494
Huddersfield Giants	14–34	Salford Red Devils	1 February 2019, 19:45	John Smith's Stadium	Liam Moore	5,387
Hull KR	18–16	Hull F.C.	1 February 2019, 19:45	KCOM Craven Park	Ben Thaler	12,100
Warrington Wolves	26–6	Leeds Rhinos	2 February 2019, 17:15	Halliwell Jones Stadium	Chris Kendall	13,098
London Broncos	42–24	Wakefield Trinity	3 February 2019, 15:00	Trailfinders Sports Ground	Tom Grant	2,149

=== Round 2 ===
Home	Score	Away	Match Information
Home	Score	Away	Date and Time	Venue	Referee	Attendance
Hull F.C.	18–26	Castleford Tigers	7 February 2019, 19:45	KCOM Stadium	Chris Kendall	11,244
Wigan Warriors	34–16	Leeds Rhinos	8 February 2019, 19:45	DW Stadium	Ben Thaler	11,230
Warrington Wolves	28–14	Hull KR	9 February 2019, 15:00	Halliwell Jones Stadium	Liam Moore	10,515
Catalans Dragons	27–10	Huddersfield Giants	9 February 2019, 17:00	Stade Gilbert Brutus	Tom Grant	9,211
Salford Red Devils	24–0	London Broncos	10 February 2019, 15:00	AJ Bell Stadium	James Child	3,236
Wakefield Trinity	18–24	St. Helens	10 February 2019, 15:00	The Mobile Rocket Stadium	Robert Hicks	5,815

=== Round 3 ===
Home	Score	Away	Match Information
Home	Score	Away	Date and Time	Venue	Referee	Attendance
Wakefield Trinity	22–12	Catalans Dragons	21 February 2019, 19:45	The Mobile Rocket Stadium	Chris Kendall	4,639
Huddersfield Giants	20–32	Warrington Wolves	22 February 2019, 19:45	John Smith's Stadium	James Child	6,076
St. Helens	27–22	Leeds Rhinos	22 February 2019, 19:45	Totally Wicked Stadium	Robert Hicks	11,638
Hull Kingston Rovers	22–24	Salford Red Devils	23 February 2019, 15:00	KCOM Craven Park	Liam Moore	7,065
London Broncos	6–40	Castleford Tigers	23 February 2019, 17:00	Trailfinders Sports Ground	Scott Mikalauskas	2,051
Wigan Warriors	22–23 (Note: After golden-point extra time)	Hull F.C.	24 February 2019, 15:00	DW Stadium	Ben Thaler	10,971

=== Round 4 ===
Home	Score	Away	Match Information
Home	Score	Away	Date and Time	Venue	Referee	Attendance
Salford Red Devils	4–26	St. Helens	28 February 2019, 19:45	AJ Bell Stadium	Ben Thaler	4,064
Castleford Tigers	32–16	Hull KR	1 March 2019, 19:45	Mend-A-Hose Jungle	Gareth Hewer	8,770
Leeds Rhinos	18–35	Wakefield Trinity	1 March 2019, 19:45	Emerald Headingley Stadium	Chris Kendall	13,148
Catalans Dragons	23–22	Warrington Wolves	2 March 2019, 18:00	Stade Gilbert Brutus	Robert Hicks	8,158
Huddersfield Giants	8–28	Hull F.C.	3 March 2019, 15:00	John Smith's Stadium	Scott Mikalauskas	6,390
London Broncos	18–16	Wigan Warriors	3 March 2019, 15:00	Trailfinders Sports Ground	Tom Grant	2,586

=== Round 5 ===
Home	Score	Away	Match Information
Home	Score	Away	Date and Time	Venue	Referee	Attendance
Warrington Wolves	24–10	Castleford Tigers	7 March 2019, 19:45	Halliwell Jones Stadium	Chris Kendall	9,231
Hull F.C.	34–10	Leeds Rhinos	8 March 2019, 19:45	KCOM Stadium	Ben Thaler	12,208
St. Helens	26–0	London Broncos	8 March 2019, 19:45	Totally Wicked Stadium	Mark Griffiths	9,090
Wigan Warriors	6–14	Huddersfield Giants	8 March 2019, 19:45	DW Stadium	Robert Hicks	10,114
Catalans Dragons	0–46	Salford Red Devils	9 March 2019, 17:00	Stade Gilbert Brutus	Scott Mikalauskas	8,021
Wakefield Trinity	6–10	Hull KR	10 March 2019, 15:00	The Mobile Rocket Stadium	Tom Grant	5,559

=== Round 6 ===
Home	Score	Away	Match Information
Home	Score	Away	Date and Time	Venue	Referee	Attendance
Huddersfield Giants	12–40	St. Helens	14 March 2019, 19:45	John Smith's Stadium	Scott Mikalauskas	4,495
Hull F.C.	12–32	Wakefield Trinity	15 March 2019, 19:45	KCOM Stadium	Liam Moore	11,190
Leeds Rhinos	16–18	London Broncos	15 March 2019, 19:45	Headingley	Chris Kendall	11,229
Warrington Wolves	25–12	Wigan Warriors	15 March 2019, 19:45	Halliwell Jones Stadium	Ben Thaler	13,106
Hull KR	16–18	Catalans Dragons	17 March 2019, 15:00	KCOM Craven Park	James Child	7,203
Castleford Tigers	24–20	Salford Red Devils	17 March 2019, 15:30	Mend-A-Hose Jungle	Robert Hicks	7,750

=== Round 7 ===
Home	Score	Away	Match Information
Home	Score	Away	Date and Time	Venue	Referee	Attendance
Wakefield Trinity	32–34	Warrington Wolves	21 March 2019, 19:45	The Mobile Rocket Stadium	Ben Thaler	4,753
Castleford Tigers	12–42	St. Helens	22 March 2019, 19:45	Mend-A-Hose Jungle	James Child	8,042
Huddersfield Giants	42–8	Hull KR	22 March 2019, 19:45	John Smiths Stadium	Greg Dolan	5,289
Catalans Dragons	26–22	Leeds Rhinos	23 March 2019, 17:00	Stade Gilbert Brutus	Robert Hicks	8,220
London Broncos	24–28	Hull F.C.	24 March 2019, 15:00	Trailfinders Sports Ground	Scott Mikalauskus	2,357
Salford Red Devils	22–30	Wigan Warriors	24 March 2019, 15:00	AJ Bell Stadium	Chris Kendall	4,770

=== Round 8 ===
Home	Score	Away	Match Information
Home	Score	Away	Date and Time	Venue	Referee	Attendance
Leeds Rhinos	21–20 (Note: After golden-point extra time)	Castleford Tigers	28 March 2019, 19:45	Headingley	Ben Thaler	12,295
Hull F.C.	12–63	Warrington Wolves	29 March 2019, 19:45	KCOM Stadium	Robert Hicks	10,810
St. Helens	36–24	Hull KR	29 March 2019, 19:45	Totally Wicked Stadium	Tom Grant	10,003
London Broncos	26–38	Huddersfield Giants	31 March 2019, 15:00	Trailfinders Sports Ground	Chris Kendall	1,419
Wakefield Trinity	33–22	Salford Red Devils	31 March 2019, 15:00	The Mobile Rocket Stadium	Scott Mikalauskus	4,356
Wigan Warriors	42–0	Catalans Dragons	31 March 2019, 15:00	DW Stadium	James Child	11,106

=== Round 9 ===
Home	Score	Away	Match Information
Home	Score	Away	Date and Time	Venue	Referee	Attendance
Hull KR	45–26	Leeds Rhinos	4 April 2019, 19:45	KCOM Craven Park	James Child	8,292
Castleford Tigers	38–28	Wigan Warriors	5 April 2019, 19:45	Mend-A-Hose Jungle	Chris Kendall	6,839
Wakefield Trinity	17–16	Huddersfield Giants	5 April 2019, 19:45	The Mobile Rocket Stadium	Scott Mikalauskus	4,730
Warrington Wolves	46–12	London Broncos	5 April 2019, 19:45	Halliwell Jones Stadium	Jack Smith	11,718
Catalans Dragons	18–10	St. Helens	6 April 2019, 17:00	Stade Gilbert Brutus	Robert Hicks	8,783
Salford Red Devils	16–23	Hull F.C.	7 April 2019, 15:00	AJ Bell Stadium	Gareth Hewer	3,609

=== Round 10 ===
Home	Score	Away	Match Information
Home	Score	Away	Date and Time	Venue	Referee	Attendance
Hull KR	22–12	London Broncos	17 February 2019, 15:00	KCOM Craven Park	Scott Mikalauskas	7,210
Salford Red Devils	14–46	Leeds Rhinos	17 February 2019, 15:00	AJ Bell Stadium	James Child	4,385
Huddersfield Giants	20–18	Castleford Tigers	11 April 2019, 19:45	John Smiths Stadium	Ben Thaler	4,684
St. Helens	38–12	Warrington Wolves	12 April 2019, 19:45	Totally Wicked Stadium	James Child	17,078
Wakefield Trinity	30–20	Wigan Warriors	12 April 2019, 19:45	The Mobile Rocket Stadium	Robert Hicks	5,694
Catalans Dragons	30–31 (Note: After golden-point extra time)	Hull F.C.	13 April 2019, 19:45	Stade Gilbert Brutus	Chris Kendall	8,220

=== Round 11 ===
(Maundy Thursday / Good Friday)

Home	Score	Away	Match Information
Home	Score	Away	Date and Time	Venue	Referee	Attendance
Castleford Tigers	28–26	Wakefield Trinity	18 April 2019, 19:45	Mend-A-Hose Jungle	Chris Kendall	9,316
London Broncos	6–39	Catalans Dragons	18 April 2019, 19:45	Trailfinders Sports Ground	Tom Grant	2,153
Hull F.C.	56–12	Hull Kingston Rovers	19 April 2019, 12:45	KCOM Stadium	Ben Thaler	20,044
Leeds Rhinos	38–18	Huddersfield Giants	19 April 2019, 15:00	Headingley	Robert Hicks	13,743
Warrington Wolves	12–36	Salford Red Devils	19 April 2019, 15:00	Halliwell Jones Stadium	Gareth Hewer	11,867
Wigan Warriors	10–36	St. Helens	19 April 2019, 15:00	DW Stadium	James Child	22,050

=== Round 12 ===
(Easter Monday)

Home	Score	Away	Match Information
Home	Score	Away	Date and Time	Venue	Referee	Attendance
Huddersfield Giants	24–19	London Broncos	22 April 2019, 15:00	John Smith's Stadium	Marcus Griffith's	4,464
Hull KR	6–54	Warrington Wolves	22 April 2019, 15:00	KCOM Craven Park	Jack Smith	7,111
Salford Red Devils	26–30	Wigan Warriors	22 April 2019, 15:00	AJ Bell Stadium	Ben Thaler	4,017
St. Helens	62–16	Hull F.C.	22 April 2019, 15:00	Totally Wicked Stadium	Robert Hicks	11,268
Wakefield Trinity	26–24	Leeds Rhinos	22 April 2019, 15:00	The Mobile Rocket Stadium	Chris Kendall	6,785
Catalans Dragons	37–16	Castleford Tigers	22 April 2019, 17:00	Stade Gilbert Brutus	James Child	10,120

=== Round 13 ===
Home	Score	Away	Match Information
Home	Score	Away	Date and Time	Venue	Referee	Attendance
London Broncos	10–30	Salford Red Devils	27 April 2019, 15:00	Trailfinders Sports Ground	Scott Mikalauskus	1,133
Wigan Warriors	6–4	Castleford Tigers	27 April 2019, 17:15	DW Stadium	Chris Kendall	10,058
Hull F.C.	30–14	Wakefield Trinity	28 April 2019, 15:00	KCOM Stadium	Liam Moore	10,254
Leeds Rhinos	28–24	Hull Kingston Rovers	28 April 2019, 15:00	Headingley	James Child	11,694
St. Helens	50–14	Catalans Dragons	28 April 2019, 15:00	Totally Wicked Stadium	Robert Hicks	11,268
Warrington Wolves	50–19	Huddersfield Giants	28 April 2019, 15:00	Halliwell Jones Stadium	Tom Grant	10,445

=== Round 14 ===
Home	Score	Away	Match Information
Home	Score	Away	Date and Time	Venue	Referee	Attendance
Wigan Warriors	18–8	London Broncos	2 May 2019, 19:45	DW Stadium	Robert Hicks	9,907
Castleford Tigers	14–26	Warrington Wolves	3 May 2019, 19:45	Mend-A-Hose Jungle	Chris Kendall	5,323
Huddersfield Giants	25–26	Wakefield Trinity	3 May 2019, 19:45	John Smiths Stadium	James Child	5,011
Hull F.C.	6–37	Catalans Dragons	3 May 2019, 19:45	KCOM Stadium	Ben Thaler	9,830
Salford Red Devils	28–16	Leeds Rhinos	3 May 2019, 19:45	AJ Bell Stadium	Scott Mikalauskus	3,368
Hull Kingston Rovers	26-42	St. Helens	5 May 2019, 15:00	KCOM Craven Park	Liam Moore	8,123

=== Round 15 ===
Home	Score	Away	Match Information
Home	Score	Away	Date and Time	Venue	Referee	Attendance
Leeds Rhinos	8–30	Castleford Tigers	16 May 2019, 19:45	Headingley	Chris Kendall	13,286
Huddersfield Giants	30–22	Hull Kingston Rovers	17 May 2019, 19:45	John Smiths Stadium	Robert Hicks	4,621
St. Helens	32–30	Salford Red Devils	17 May 2019, 19:45	Totally Wicked Stadium	Scott Mikalauskus	9,446
London Broncos	42–34	Wakefield Trinity	18 May 2019, 15:00	Trailfinders Sports Ground	Liam Moore	1,205
Warrington Wolves	12–19	Hull F.C.	18 May 2019, 15:00	Halliwell Jones Stadium	James Child	10,600
Catalans Dragons	33–16	Wigan Warriors	18 May 2019, 15:30	Nou Camp	Ben Thaler	31,555

=== Round 16 ===
(Magic Weekend)

Home	Score	Away	Match Information
Home	Score	Away	Date and Time	Venue	Referee	Attendance
Wakefield Trinity	18–25	Catalans Dragons	25 May 2019, 14:00	Anfield	Scott Mikalauskus	30,057
Hull F.C.	2–55	Huddersfield Giants	25 May 2019, 16:30	Anfield	Liam Moore	30,057
Wigan Warriors	14–26	Warrington Wolves	25 May 2019, 19:00	Anfield	Chris Kendall	30,057
Salford Red Devils	20–22	Hull KR	26 May 2019, 13:00	Anfield	Ben Thaler	26,812
Leeds Rhinos	24–22	London Broncos	26 May 2019, 15:30	Anfield	James Child	26,812
St. Helens	36–16	Castleford Tigers	26 May 2019, 18:00	Anfield	Robert Hicks	26,812

=== Round 17 ===
Home	Score	Away	Match Information
Home	Score	Away	Date and Time	Venue	Referee	Attendance
Castleford Tigers	27–26 (Note: After golden-point extra time)	Huddersfield Giants	7 June 2019, 19:45	Mend-A-Hose Jungle	Ben Thaler	7,483
Hull F.C.	35–32	Salford Red Devils	7 June 2019, 19:45	KCOM Stadium	Liam Moore	9,914
Wakefield Trinity	0–10	Leeds Rhinos	7 June 2019, 19:45	The Mobile Rocket Stadium	Robert Hicks	5,498
Warrington Wolves	34–4	Catalans Dragons	8 June 2019, 15:15	Halliwell Jones Stadium	Chris Kendall	10,015
Hull KR	18–19	Wigan Warriors	9 June 2019, 15:00	Kcom Craven Park	Scott Mikalauskus	8,010
London Broncos	23–22 (Note: After golden-point extra time)	St. Helens	9 June 2019, 15:00	Trailfinders Sports Ground	Marcus Griffiths	2,801

=== Round 18 ===
Home	Score	Away	Match Information
Home	Score	Away	Date and Time	Venue	Referee	Attendance
Castleford Tigers	18–31	Hull F.C.	13 June 2019, 19:45	Mend-A-Hose Jungle	Robert Hicks	6,344
Leeds Rhinos	14–23	Wigan Warriors	14 June 2019, 19:45	Headingley	Chris Kendall	13,105
St. Helens	36–2	Huddersfield Giants	14 June 2019, 19:45	Totally Wicked Stadium	Scott Mikalauskus	9,527
Hull KR	16–14	Warrington Wolves	15 June 2019, 15:00	KCOM Craven Park	James Child	7,390
Catalans Dragons	12–30	London Broncos	15 June 2019, 18:00	Stade Gilbert Brutus	Liam Moore	8,137
Salford Red Devils	44–20	Wakefield Trinity	16 June 2019, 15:00	AJ Bell Stadium	Marcus Griffiths	2,950

- Fixtures/times may change

=== Round 19 ===
Home	Score	Away	Match Information
Home	Score	Away	Date and Time	Venue	Referee	Attendance
London Broncos	26–24	Hull KR	20 June 2019, 19:45	Trailfinders Sports Ground	Chris Kendall	1,503
Huddersfield Giants	22–38	Wigan Warriors	21 June 2019, 19:45	John Smiths Stadium	Marcus Griffiths	5,578
Salford Red Devils	26–16	Castleford Tigers	21 June 2019, 19:45	AJ Bell Stadium	Scott Mikalauskus	2,929
St. Helens	36–10	Leeds Rhinos	21 June 2019, 19:45	Totally Wicked Stadium	Ben Thaler	11,848
Warrington Wolves	30–6	Wakefield Trinity	21 June 2019, 19:45	Halliwell Jones Stadium	Liam Moore	8,635
Catalans Dragons	10–50	Hull F.C.	22 June 2019, 18:00	Stade Gilbert Brutus	Robert Hicks	10,284

- Fixtures/times may change

=== Round 20 ===
Home	Score	Away	Match Information
Home	Score	Away	Date and Time	Venue	Referee	Attendance
Hull KR	18–10	Hull F.C.	27 June 2019, 19:45	KCOM Craven Park	Robert Hicks	10,221
Wakefield Trinity	36–10	Huddersfield Giants	28 June 2019, 19:45	The Mobile Rocket Stadium	Greg Dolan	4,846
Warrington Wolves	10–21	St. Helens	28 June 2019, 19:45	Halliwell Jones Stadium	Ben Thaler	14,211
Wigan Warriors	28–12	Salford Red Devils	28 June 2019, 19:45	DW Stadium	Chris Kendall	12,066
Leeds Rhinos	31–12	Catalans Dragons	30 June 2019, 15:00	Headingley	Scott Mikalauskus	12,638
Castleford Tigers	42–10	London Broncos	30 June 2019, 15:30	Mend-A-Hose Jungle	Marcus Griffiths	6,860

- Fixtures/times may change

=== Round 21 ===
Home	Score	Away	Match Information
Home	Score	Away	Date and Time	Venue	Referee	Attendance
Salford Red Devils	18–36	Huddersfield Giants	4 July 2019, 19:45	AJ Bell Stadium	Robert Hicks	2,368
Castleford Tigers	10–18	Leeds Rhinos	5 July 2019, 19:45	Mend-A-Hose Jungle	Ben Thaler	8,147
Hull F.C.	12–40	St. Helens	5 July 2019, 19:45	KCOM Stadium	Chris Kendall	11,311
Wigan Warriors	52–10	Hull KR	5 July 2019, 19:45	DW Stadium	Marcus Griffiths	11,042
London Broncos	6–36	Warrington Wolves	6 July 2019, 15:00	Trailfinders Sports Ground	Greg Dolan	2,357
Catalans Dragons	44–10	Wakefield Trinity	6 July 2019, 18:00	Stade Gilbert Brutus	Liam Moore	7,237

- Fixtures/times may change

=== Round 22 ===
Home	Score	Away	Match Information
Home	Score	Away	Date and Time	Venue	Referee	Attendance
Hull F.C.	35–22	London Broncos	11 July 2019, 19:45	KCOM Stadium	Liam Moore	11,401
Huddersfield Giants	28–32	Catalans Dragons	12 July 2019, 19:45	John Smiths Stadium	Greg Dolan	4,451
Leeds Rhinos	16–32	Hull KR	12 July 2019, 19:45	Headingley	Robert Hicks	13,679
St. Helens	32–10	Wigan Warriors	12 July 2019, 19:45	Totally Wicked Stadium	Ben Thaler	17,088
Wakefield Trinity	16–36	Castleford Tigers	12 July 2019, 19:45	The Mobile Rocket Stadium	Chris Kendall	6,244
Warrington Wolves	12–22	Salford Red Devils	12 July 2019, 19:45	Halliwell Jones Stadium	Marcus Griffiths	9,509

=== Round 23 ===
Home	Score	Away	Match Information
Home	Score	Away	Date and Time	Venue	Referee	Attendance
Wigan Warriors	46–16	Wakefield Trinity	18 July 2019, 19:45	DW Stadium	Robert Hicks	10,203
Hull KR	12–18	Huddersfield Giants	19 July 2019, 19:45	KCOM Craven Park	Ben Thaler	7,743
Leeds Rhinos	24–26	Hull F.C.	21 July 2019, 15:00	Headingley	Marcus Griffiths	13,351
London Broncos	32–12	St. Helens	21 July 2019, 15:00	Trailfinders Sports Ground	Tom Grant	2,087
Salford Red Devils	40–14	Catalans Dragons	21 July 2019, 15:00	AJ Bell Stadium	Chris Kendall	2,758
Castleford Tigers	27–18	Warrington Wolves	21 July 2019, 15:30	Mend-A-Hose Jungle	Scott Mikalauskus	6,965

=== Round 24 ===
Home	Score	Away	Match Information
Home	Score	Away	Date and Time	Venue	Referee	Attendance
Hull F.C.	14–15	Wigan Warriors	1 August 2019, 19:45 (Note: game originally scheduled for 3 August, but brought forward for sky sports showing)	KCOM Stadium	Ben Thaler	10,153
Huddersfield Giants	0–44	Leeds Rhinos	2 August 2019, 19:45	John Smiths Stadium	Robert Hicks	6,809
St. Helens	26–6	Wakefield Trinity	2 August 2019, 19:45	Totally Wicked Stadium	Marcus Griffiths	9,494
Catalans Dragons	30–10	Warrington Wolves	3 August 2019, 17:00	Stade Gilbert Brutus	James Child	9,634
Hull KR	27–26 (Note: After golden-point extra time)	Castleford Tigers	4 August 2019, 15:00	KCOM Craven Park	Chris Kendall	8,004
London Broncos	28–58	Salford Red Devils	4 August 2019, 15:00	Trailfinders Sports Ground	Liam Moore	1,445

=== Round 25 ===
Home	Score	Away	Match Information
Home	Score	Away	Date and Time	Venue	Referee	Attendance
Warrington Wolves	12–30	St. Helens	8 August 2019, 19:45	Halliwell Jones Stadium	Ben Thaler	10,987
Leeds Rhinos	48–8	Catalans Dragons	9 August 2019, 19:45	Headingley	Robert Hicks	11,336
Wigan Warriors	36–18	Hull KR	9 August 2019, 19:45	DW Stadium	Chris Kendall	10,702
Castleford Tigers	20–6	London Broncos	10 August 2019, 19:30	Mend-A-Hose Jungle	Scott Mikalauskus	5,497
Salford Red Devils	32–12	Huddersfield Giants	11 August 2019, 15:00	AJ Bell Stadium	Marcus Griffiths	2,750
Wakefield Trinity	16–26	Hull F.C.	11 August 2019, 15:00	The Mobile Rocket Stadium	Liam Moore	5,600

=== Round 26 ===
Home	Score	Away	Match Information
Home	Score	Away	Date and Time	Venue	Referee	Attendance
Leeds Rhinos	20–36	St. Helens	15 August 2019, 19:45	Headingley	Chris Kendall	12,153
Wigan Warriors	20–6	Warrington Wolves	16 August 2019, 19:45	DW Stadium	Ben Thaler	12,555
Catalans Dragons	4–17	London Broncos	17 August 2019, 17:00	Stade Gilbert Brutus	Liam Moore	7,727
Hull F.C.	22–44	Salford Red Devils	17 August 2019, 17:00	KCOM Stadium	Scott Mikalauskus	11,217
Huddersfield Giants	0–24	Castleford Tigers	18 August 2019, 15:00	John Smith's Stadium	James Child	4,636
Hull KR	10–38	Wakefield Trinity	18 August 2019, 15:00	KCOM Craven Park	Robert Hicks	8,095

- Fixtures/times may change

=== Round 27 ===
Home	Score	Away	Match Information
Home	Score	Away	Date and Time	Venue	Referee	Attendance
Salford Red Devils	22–6	Warrington Wolves	29 August 2019, 19:45	AJ Bell Stadium	Chris Kendall	4,879
Hull F.C.	12–22	Huddersfield Giants	30 August 2019, 19:45	KCOM Stadium	Liam Moore	10,114
St. Helens	4–0	Castleford Tigers	30 August 2019, 19:45	Totally Wicked Stadium	James Child	10,315
Catalans Dragons	6–24	Hull KR	31 August 2019, 17:00	Stade Gilbert Brutus	Ben Thaler	8,253
London Broncos	10–36	Leeds Rhinos	1 September 2019, 15:00	Trailfinders Sports Ground	Robert Hicks	3,051
Wakefield Trinity	16–24	Wigan Warriors	1 September 2019, 15:00	The Mobile Rocket Stadium	Scott Mikalauskus	5,805

=== Round 28 ===
Home	Score	Away	Match Information
Home	Score	Away	Date and Time	Venue	Referee	Attendance
Castleford Tigers	44–12	Hull F.C.	5 September 2019, 19:45	Mend-A-Hose Jungle	Ben Thaler	6,712
Hull KR	16–20	London Broncos	6 September 2019, 19:45	KCOM Craven Park	James Child	8,020
Leeds Rhinos	12–20	Salford Red Devils	6 September 2019, 19:45	Headingley	Liam Moore	12,436
St. Helens	48-6	Huddersfield Giants	6 September 2019, 19:45	Totally Wicked Stadium	Marcus Griffiths	9,560
Warrington Wolves	23–16	Wakefield Trinity	6 September 2019, 19:45	Halliwell Jones Stadium	Chris Kendall	10,158
Wigan Warriors	46–12	Catalans Dragons	6 September 2019, 19:45	DW Stadium	Robert Hicks	10,804

- Fixtures/Times may change

=== Round 29 ===
Home	Score	Away	Match Information
Home	Score	Away	Date and Time	Venue	Referee	Attendance
Wigan Warriors	26–8	Castleford Tigers	12 September 2019, 19:45	DW Stadium	James Child	11,001
Huddersfield Giants	24–22	Catalans Dragons	13 September 2019, 19:45	John Smiths Stadium	Ben Thaler	5,242
Hull F.C.	6–22	St. Helens	13 September 2019, 19:45	KCOM Stadium	Liam Moore	11,004
Leeds Rhinos	26–4	Warrington Wolves	13 September 2019, 19:45	Headingley	Marcus Griffiths	14,085
Salford Red Devils	17–16 (Note: After golden-point extra time)	Hull KR	13 September 2019, 19:45	AJ Bell Stadium	Chris Kendall	5,393
Wakefield Trinity	19–10	London Broncos	13 September 2019, 19:45	The Mobile Rocket Stadium	Robert Hicks	6,230

== Playoffs ==
=== Week 1: Elimination and qualifying finals ===
Home	Score	Away	Match Information
Home	Score	Away	Date and Time	Venue	Referee	Attendance
Elimination final
Warrington Wolves	12–14	Castleford Tigers	19 September 2019, 19:45	Halliwell Jones Stadium	Chris Kendall	5,627
Qualifying final
Wigan Warriors	18–12	Salford	20 September 2019, 19:45	DW Stadium	Robert Hicks	9,247
Progress to semi-final 2: Castleford Tigers, Salford Red Devils; Progress to semi-final 1: Wigan Warriors; Eliminated: Warrington Wolves

=== Week 2: Semi-finals ===
Home	Score	Away	Match Information
Home	Score	Away	Date and Time	Venue	Referee	Attendance
Semi-final 2
Salford	22–0	Castleford	26 September 2019, 19:45	AJ Bell Stadium	Ben Thaler	4,800
Semi-final 1
St. Helens	40–10	Wigan Warriors	27 September 2019, 19:45	Totally Wicked Stadium	Chris Kendall	14,508
Progress to Preliminary Final: Salford Red Devils, Wigan Warriors; Progress to Grand Final: St Helens; Eliminated: Castleford Tigers

=== Week 3: Preliminary final ===
Home	Score	Away	Match Information
Home	Score	Away	Date and Time	Venue	Referee	Attendance
Wigan	4–28	Salford	4 October 2019, 19:45	DW Stadium	Ben Thaler	9,858
Progress to Grand Final: Salford; Eliminated: Wigan

=== Week 4: Grand final ===
Home	Score	Away	Match Information
Home	Score	Away	Date and Time	Venue	Referee	Attendance
St. Helens	23–6	Salford	12 October 2019, 18:00	Old Trafford, Manchester	Chris Kendall	64,102
