= Javier Rojas Alvarez =

Argentine rugby union player (born 1991)

Javier Rojas
- Full name: Javier Rojas Alvarez
- Born: 15 April 1991 (age 35) Tucumán, Argentina
- Height: 1.72 m (5 ft 8 in)
- Weight: 85 kg (13 st 5 lb; 187 lb)

Rugby union career
- Position(s): Fullback, Centre
- Current team: Cornish Pirates
Amateur team(s)
Years	Team	Apps	(Points)
2011–13	Uni Tucumán		
Senior career
Years	Team	Apps	(Points)
2011–12	Uni Tucumán	0	(0)
2012–17	Pampas XV	19	(27)
2015-16	Albi	20	(8)
2017-18	Rugby Viadana	0	(0)
2018-	Cornish Pirates		
- Correct as of 4 January 2014
International career
Years	Team	Apps	(Points)
2011	Argentina U20	8	(0)
2012–	Argentina	4	(5)
2013−17	Argentina 7s 7s	88	(358)
- Correct as of 4 January 2014

Javier Rojas Alvarez (Note: In this Spanish name, the first or paternal surname is Rojas and the second or maternal family name is Alvarez.) (born 15 April 1991 in Tucumán) is an Argentine rugby union footballer playing as a fullback or as a centre. He currently plays for the Cornish Pirates in the English RFU Championship. He previously played for a number of clubs, including Uni Tucumán, Pampas XV in the South African Vodacom Cup, French side Albi in Pro D2 and Rugby Viadana in the Italian Top12.

He has four caps for Argentina, since 2012, with 1 try scored, 5 points on aggregate. He competed at the 2016 Summer Olympics for the Argentina national rugby sevens team.

== Honors and records ==
- RFU Championship Cup top points scorer: 2018–19 (65 points)
