= Gerry Harrison =

English football commentator (1936–2025)

Gerarld Philip Harrison (1 August 1936 – 23 August 2025) was an English football commentator on television from the 1970s to the 1990s, working for ITV. In the latter part of his career he was a senior television executive with production company TWI, who produce coverage of Premier League football, international golf and tennis among other sports. He left this role in 2007.

== Life and career ==
Harrison was born in Upminster, Essex on 1 August 1936. He played football to what he described as a decent level, while at the University of Oxford and for Altrincham, on his way to becoming a news reporter with the Daily Express and The Times. He switched to broadcasting in 1967 with BBC Radio Merseyside, taking up football commentary duties along the way.

Harrison entered the BBC's Find a Commentator competition in 1969. Despite making the final six he lost out on the prize of a working trip to the 1970 FIFA World Cup to Welshman Idwal Robling. However, Harrison was to get the better deal out of it. Partly on the strength of his performance in the competition, he was offered a post as a commentator for Norwich-based Anglia Television. While Robling covered a couple of games in Mexico for the BBC, Harrison worked on the competition as part of ITV's commentary team covering seven matches. It was the first of six World Cups he would cover for ITV.

Anglia's staple football programme Match of the Week chronicled a superb spell for Ipswich Town under the guidance of Bobby Robson, as well as the fortunes of Norwich City, Luton Town, Cambridge United, Peterborough United, Colchester United, Southend United and Northampton Town. Harrison worked as presenter and commentator before its eventual demise in 1983. He also covered the first leg of the 1981 UEFA Cup final, featuring Ipswich, for Anglia and the ITV network. Harrison also presented at the sports desk with Thames Television for Thames News.

Network responsibilities rarely came Harrison's way outside of the World Cup. He commentated on live matches in 1970, 1974, 1978, 1982 and 1986, and also worked on the 1990 tournament. He was also a regular voice on Football League highlights on both The Big Match and Midweek Sports Special. He freelanced for BSB in its early days - covering the 1990 FA Cup semi-final between Liverpool and Crystal Palace among other matches. He also covered matches for Eurosport, British Aerospace Sportscast and Screensport.

In 1985, Harrison took over as Head of Sport at Anglia but left in 1993, frustrated at ITV's inability to maintain rights to top-flight football. He joined TWI as a producer and has worked on many shows including the long-running Futbol Mundial programme. He also occasionally commentated, notably covering the FIFA World Club Championship for international audiences since its inception in 2005. In 2005 Gerry returned to Anglia as a guest on their 50 years of ITV programme. In 2006, he hosted the first edition of Anglia Soccer Night of the season. He also appeared as a studio guest and was seen regularly hosting Soccer Rewind on Anglia Soccer Night in the 2006/2007 season.

Harrison died on 23 August 2025, at the age of 89.
