= Idwal Robling =

Welsh footballer

- Born: James Idwal Robling; 1927; Ynyshir, Rhondda, Wales
- Died: 9 June 2011 (aged 84); Newport
- Occupations: Amateur Footballer, Factory Manager, Presenter, Journalist

Idwal Robling
Personal information
- Position: Half back

Senior career*
| Years | Team | Apps | (Gls) |
- Lovell's Athletic

International career
| 1952-1957 | Wales Amateurs | 13 | (0) |
- * Club domestic league appearances and goals

James Idwal Robling (1927 – 9 June 2011) was a Wales Amateur international footballer and later Welsh sports commentator, who worked for the BBC in Wales for almost 40 years.

== Biography ==
Robling was born in Ynyshir in the Rhondda, where he attended the local grammar school. His education was interrupted by the Second World War, and upon being called up was accepted for service in the Royal Navy. However, he was selected by ballot to become a Bevin Boy so instead of going to the Navy he was conscripted to work in the coal mines. After the war, he resumed his education and qualified as a teacher after attending Caerleon College and Loughborough University, although instead of teaching he decided on a different career and became a manager at the Lovell's sweet factory in Newport, Monmouthshire.

=== Football career ===
Robling was an outstanding amateur footballer, and was part of the Great Britain squad for the 1952 Summer Olympic Games in Helsinki. He won 13 caps as an amateur international for Wales, and captained the team on one occasion. He also played for Lovell's Athletic, his company's works team which played at a high level in the semi-professional Southern League. As his playing career wound down he became involved in sports reporting, and in the 1960s he worked part-time for both BBC Wales Radio as a sports commentator as well as writing reports for The Times, but he was still working as a sales manager in 1969, when he won the BBC competition to find an extra person for the BBC's 1970 World Cup television commentary team in Mexico. Ten thousand people entered, and Robling's rivals in the final six included Ed Stewart, Ian St John and Gerry Harrison. In the final round of judging Robling tied with St John, a Scottish former international footballer, and the casting vote went to the then England football manager Sir Alf Ramsey who was well known for his love of the Welsh accent.

=== Television career ===
After his victory Robling joined the BBC football Match of the Day team, covering matches in the South and West of England area during a short-lived experiment at covering regional matches, and did indeed go to the 1970 World Cup, commentating on a number of first-round games although none of them were broadcast live in the UK. At the start of the 1970/71 season he replaced Wally Barnes as the regular TV football reporter and commentator on BBC Wales, a role he held for the next sixteen seasons, as well as occasionally covering Boxing and Rugby League

In those days of limited football coverage he was used mainly as a reporter by BBC Wales and his commentaries were largely restricted to the occasional Match of the Day opt-out, Welsh Cup game or international friendly, but Cardiff City and Wrexham's exploits in the European Cup Winners Cup in the 1970s saw him commentate on some memorable European games against the likes of Real Madrid, Hajduk Split and Anderlecht. He commentated on many Wales' international matches, including Wales' home defeat in the 1978 World Cup Qualifier against Scotland when a controversial refereeing decision saw the Scots being given a late penalty. In the 1976 European Championship Qualifier he had seen Wales become the first team in 30 years to beat Hungary in the Nep stadium, declaring almost incredulously as John Mahoney scored the second goal, "and it's 2-0 to Wales...IT'S AS SIMPLE AS THAT!" (probably his most remembered line of commentary for Welsh fans), and in his final major international he commentated on Mark Hughes' "wondergoal" in a 3-0 win in the 1986 World Cup Qualifier against Spain. It was probably fitting that he lived to see Swansea City win promotion to the Premier League of English football in the spring of 2011, as they started their previous top-flight campaign with an emphatic 5-1 victory over Leeds United on the opening day of the 1981-82 First Division season, a game covered by Robling and which gave him a rare top-billing on the network Match of the Day.

=== Post-television life ===
With his 60th birthday approaching Robling retired from commentating at the end of the 1984-85 season but he continued covering football as a reporter with a local news agency. He returned to the BBC in an off-screen role as a producer on the Scrum V and Sport Wales programmes, and was still working there until a few months before his death.

Robling died in Newport, aged 84, following a short illness. He was married with a son and two daughters. His grandson Lewis Robling is a professional rugby union player.
