= Gearoid Lyons =

Irish rugby union player

- Born: 13 April 1995 (age 31) Limerick, Ireland
- Height: 1.80 m (5 ft 11 in)
- Weight: 89 kg (14.0 st; 196 lb)
- School: Crescent College

Rugby union career
- Position(s): Fly-half, Centre
Amateur team(s)
Years	Team	Apps	(Points)
2013–2014	Shannon		
Senior career
Years	Team	Apps	(Points)
2016–present	Nottingham	45	(55)
- Correct as of 13 April 2019

Gearoid Lyons (born 13 April 1995) is an Irish rugby union player. He plays for English side Nottingham in the RFU Championship. Lyons plays primarily as a fly-half.

== Early life ==
Lyons captained Crescent College to a 27–5 victory against Rockwell College in the 2013 Munster Schools Rugby Senior Cup Final.

== Nottingham ==
In May 2016, whilst still in the Munster Academy, Lyons signed a contract with English RFU Championship side Nottingham.
