= Dougie Flockhart =

Scotland international rugby league & union footballer (born 1984)

Personal information
- Full name: Douglas Flockhart
- Born: 25 November 1984 (age 41)
- Height: 189 cm (6 ft 2 in)
- Weight: 94 kg (207 lb; 14 st 11 lb)

Playing information

Rugby league
- Position: Wing, Centre
Club
Years	Team	Pld	T	G	FG	P
2005	Clyde Buccaneers
2013–2013	York City Knights		6	1		26
	Total	0	6	1	0	26
Representative
Years	Team	Pld	T	G	FG	P
2005	Scotland	2

Rugby union
- Position: Wing
Club
Years	Team	Pld	T	G	FG	P
2004–06	Currie RFC
2006–07	Border Reivers	9	1
2007–09	Esher RFC	63	32	0	0	160
2009–2021	Doncaster R.F.C.	228	49			1346
	Total	300	82	0	0	1506
Representative
Years	Team	Pld	T	G	FG	P
2006	Scotland A
2008	Barbarian F.C.	1	2			10
- Source: As of 25 October 2015 (Doncaster R.F.C. stats up to end of 2014-15 season)

Douglas Flockhart (born 25 November 1984) is a Scottish professional rugby league and rugby union footballer who played in the 2000s and 2020s. He has played representative level rugby league for Scotland, and at club level for the Clyde Buccaneers and the York City Knights, as a wing or centre, and representative level rugby union for Scotland A, at invitational level for Barbarian F.C., and at club level for Currie RFC, Border Reivers, Esher RFC and Doncaster R.F.C., as a wing.

== International honours ==
Dougie Flockhart won caps for Scotland (RL) while at the Clyde Buccaneers in 2005.
