= Junior Bulumakau =

Fijian rugby union player (born 1991)

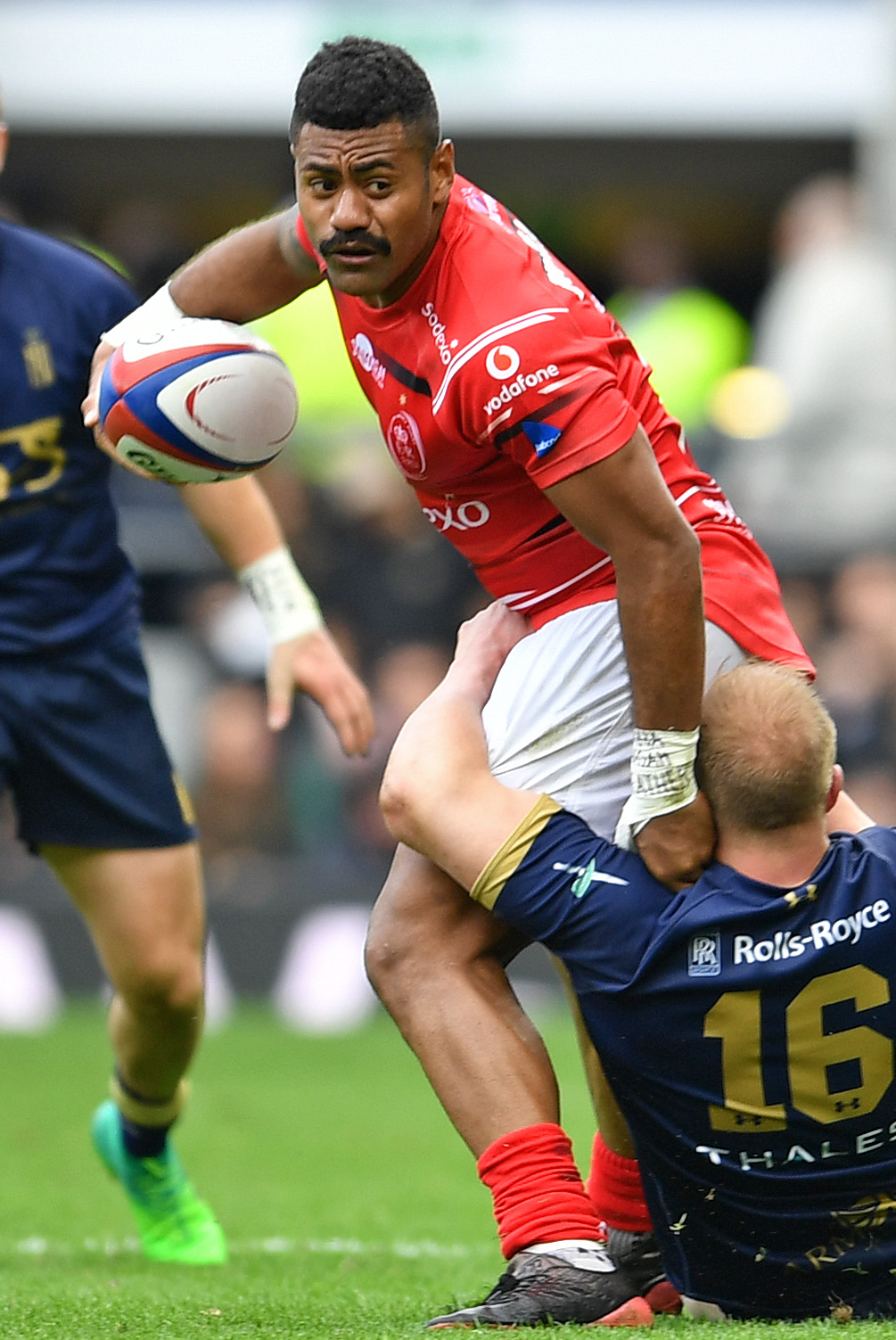
- Born: Ratu Jonasa Bulumakau; 27 February 1991 (age 35) Lautoka, Fiji
- Height: 183 cm (6 ft 0 in)
- Weight: 94 kg (207 lb)
- School: Firrhill High School, Edinburgh
- Notable relative: Andrew Bulumakau (brother)

Rugby union career
- Position(s): Wing & Full Back
Amateur team(s)
Years	Team	Apps	(Points)
- Heriots
–	Belfast Harlequins		
–	SCOTS British Army rugby		
–	Glasgow Hawks		
–	Highland		
Senior career
Years	Team	Apps	(Points)
2015–2017	Glasgow Warriors	8	(15)
2017–2018	Doncaster Knights	0	(0)
2018–2019	Coventry	0	(0)
National sevens team
Years	Team		Comps
2016	Scotland 7s		4

Junior Bulumakau (born 27 February 1991) is a Fijian born Scotland Rugby Union 7's player who plays for Coventry Rugby Club. He previously played for Glasgow Warriors. and Doncaster Knights. His normal position is on the Wing but he can also play Full Back.

Junior Bulumakau is a serving soldier within the Royal Regiment of Scotland and serves within their 3rd Battalion, 3 SCOTS.

== Rugby union career ==
=== Amateur career ===
During his early career he played for the Scottish Premiership sides Heriot's Rugby Club, Boroughmuir RFC, Ayr RFC & Glasgow Hawks.

Since 2015 he has represented the Army Rugby Union in their annual match against the Royal Navy Rugby Union. In 2015 he won the Man of the Match in a 36–18 win in front of 80,000 fans at Twickenham, England.

As a soldier in the Royal Scots Borderers, 3rd Battalion He is currently based at Fort George Barracks in Inverness, Scotland.

=== Professional career ===
He played for Bath 7s in the Premiership Rugby 7's Series in 2014.

In 2015 he signed for Glasgow Warriors on a two year long contract from the Royal Regiment of Scotland in the British Army, where he played for their rugby team.

Junior Bulumakau won his Glasgow Warriors contract after a successful trial with the club. He played, as a trialist, against European Champions Cup runners-up Clermont in a 2015–16 pre-season friendly for the Warriors; scoring a try against the French opposition.

On 23 May 2017 it was announced that Bulumakau had moved to the Doncaster Knights to play alongside his brother Andrew Bulumakau.

On 12 April 2018, Junior, along with his brother Andrew, signed for Championship rivals Coventry from the 2018-19 season.

=== International career ===
At the age of eight, Bulumakau moved with his parents from Fiji to Scotland when his father joined the British Army. He has thus been through the Scottish schooling system and is Scottish qualified, not only on residence. He has told BBC Scotland that he would love the chance to play for Scotland: "It's a massive dream for me; I've been watching Scotland since I was a kid; it would be an honour".

On 25 January 2016, Junior Bulumakau was named in the Scotland Sevens squad for the upcoming Wellington Sevens tournament. He made his international debut in the tournament, confirming his Scottish nationality, on 30 January 2016. He played against South Africa, coming off the bench for his debut. Although Scotland lost the match 28–5, Bulumakau scored Scotland's only try.

== Family ==
His brother Andrew Bulumakau also plays rugby. They joined forces when Junior signed for Doncaster Knights and then to Coventry.
