= Matt Williams (rugby union, born 1998) =

English rugby player (born 1998)

- Born: Mathew Williams; 16 March 1998 (age 28) Chertsey, England
- Height: 1.84 m (6 ft 0 in)
- Weight: 90 kg (14 st 2 lb)

Rugby union career
- Position: Centre
- Current team: London Irish
Senior career
Years	Team	Apps	(Points)
2016–	London Irish		
- Correct as of 28 December 2020
- Correct as of 28 December 2020

Matt Williams (born 16 March 1998) is an English rugby union player who plays for London Irish in the Premiership Rugby.
