= Lewis Robling =

Welsh rugby union footballer

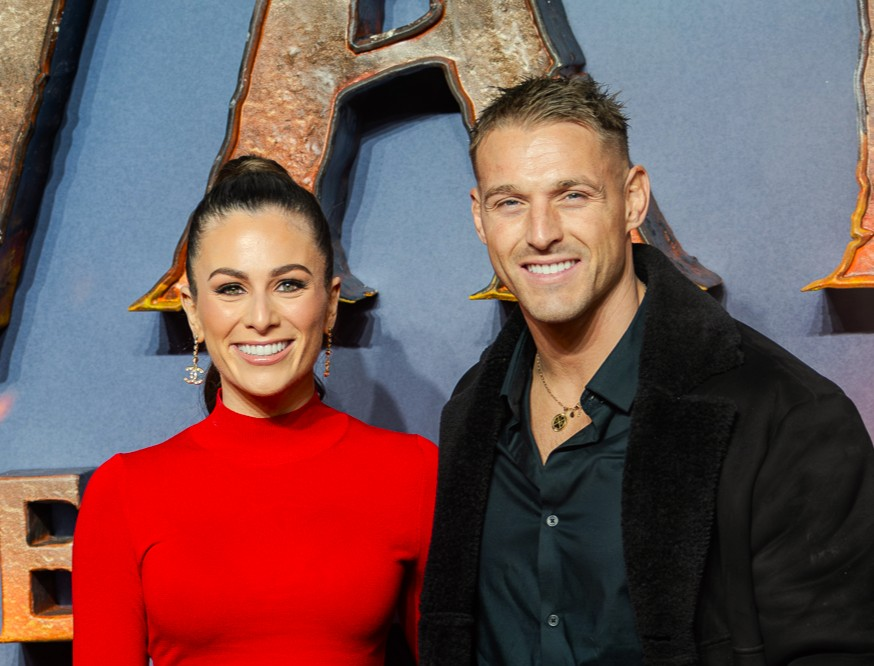
- Robling (right) in 2025
- Born: Lewis David Robling; 3 October 1991 (age 35) Caerleon, Newport, Wales
- Height: 183 cm (6 ft 0 in)
- Weight: 97 kg (15 st 4 lb)
- School: Ysgol Gyfun Gwynllyw

Rugby union career
- Position(s): Fly-half, Centre
- Current team: Blackheath
Youth career
- 2005-2008: Caerleon R.F.C.
- 2008: Newport RFC
Senior career
Years	Team	Apps	(Points)
2009-2014	Newport RFC	35	(209)
2011-2014	Dragons	36	(95)
2014-2017	Jersey Reds	0	(0)
2017-18	Ealing Trailfinders	0	(0)
2018-2020	Bedford Blues		
2020–	Blackheath		
- Correct as of 1 July 2020 (UTC)
International career
Years	Team	Apps	(Points)
2010–2011	Wales U20	4	(5)
- Correct as of 17 March 2012 (UTC)

Lewis David Robling (born 3 October 1991) is a former Wales Under-20 international rugby union player. Robling plays for Blackheath having progressed through the academy team at Dragons and previously played for Newport RFC. His usual position is Fly Half or Centre.

Robling made his debut for Newport Gwent Dragons versus Glasgow on 7 October 2011. He scored his first try for the Dragons in the 21–20 win against the Ospreys 6 January 2012.

In April 2014 Robling signed for English Championship club Jersey Reds.

On 14 April 2017, Robling signed for Championship rivals Ealing Trailfinders for the 2017–18 season.

On 16 May 2018 Robling signed for another Championship rival, Bedford Blues, for the 2018–19 season.

He joined National League 1 side Blackheath ahead of the 2020–21 season.

== Personal ==
Lewis Robling is the Grandson of the former BBC commentator Idwal Robling who was part of the Great Britain football squad for the 1952 Summer Olympic Games in Helsinki.
