= Andrew Bulumakau =

Fijian rugby union player (born 1992)

- Born: Andrew Bulumakau; 28 July 1992 (age 34) Fiji
- Height: 178 cm (5 ft 10 in)
- Weight: 87 kg (192 lb)
- Notable relative(s): Junior Bulumakau, brother

Rugby union career
- Position(s): Centre, Wing
- Current team: Coventry
Senior career
| Years | Team | Apps | (Points) |
| 2013-14 | Gloucester | | |
| 2014–2018 | Doncaster Knights | | |
| 2018– | Coventry | | |

Andrew Bulumakau (born 28 July 1992) is a Scottish Professional rugby union player who plays Coventry in the RFU Championship. He was born in Fiji but was raised up in Scotland. He previously competed for Gloucester Rugby where he was dual-registered with Cinderford He made a name for himself when he played in his first JP Morgan 7s in 2013 for Gloucester Rugby and helped them win their first ever JP Morgan 7s title in 2013.

After his release from Gloucester, Bulumakau signed for Doncaster Knights who compete in the RFU Championship from the 2014–15 season. On 12 April 2018, Bulumakau left Doncaster to join Championship rivals Coventry ahead of the 2018–19 season.

His brother Junior Bulumakau is a Scottish international Sevens player.
