= Jacob Perry =

American racing driver (born 2001)

- Nationality: American
- Born: Jacob Adam Perry; December 26, 2001 (age 24) Stonington, Connecticut, U.S.

NASCAR Whelen Modified Tour career
- Debut season: 2019
- Years active: 2019, 2022–2023, 2026–present
- Starts: 8
- Championships: 0
- Wins: 0
- Poles: 0
- Best finish: 41st in 2026
- Finished last season: 41st (2026)
- Statistics up to date as of October 12, 2026.

Jacob Adam Perry (born December 26, 2001) is an American professional stock car racing driver. He currently competes part-time in the NASCAR Whelen Modified Tour, driving the No. 2 for Perry Racing. He last competed part-time in the SMART Modified Tour, driving the No. 21CT for his father Dennis Perry. He competed in the NASCAR Whelen Modified Tour from 2019 to 2023.

Perry has also competed in series such as the CARS Super Late Model Tour, the Carolina Pro Late Model Series, the Monaco Modified Tri-Track Series, and the Modified Racing Series, where he won the 2022 series championship driving for series founder Jack Bateman.

== Motorsports results ==
=== NASCAR ===
(key) (Bold – Pole position awarded by qualifying time. Italics – Pole position earned by points standings or practice time. * – Most laps led.)

==== Whelen Modified Tour ====
NASCAR Whelen Modified Tour results
Year	Car owner	No.	Make	1	2	3	4	5	6	7	8	9	10	11	12	13	14	15	16	17	18	NWMTC	Pts	Ref
2019	Jason Sechrist	23	Chevy	MYR	SBO	TMP	STA	WAL	SEE	TMP	RIV	NHA; 38	STA	TMP	OSW	RIV	NHA	STA	TMP			73rd	6	
2022	Jack Bateman	47	Chevy	NSM	RCH	RIV	LEE; 15	JEN	MND; 10	RIV	WAL	NHA	CLM	TMP	LGY	OSW	RIV	TMP	MAR			50th	63	
2023	Jack Bateman	47	Chevy	NSM	RCH	MON; 28	RIV	LEE	SEE	RIV	WAL	NHA	LMP	THO	LGY	OSW						47th	64	
2023	Dennis Perry	21	Chevy														MON; 13	RIV	NWS; 27	THO	MAR	47th	64	
2026	Perry Racing	2	N/A	NSM	MAR	THO	SEE	RIV	OXF	SEE	CLM	WMM	MON	THO	NHA; 16	STA	OSW	RIV	THO; 17			41st	55	

=== CARS Super Late Model Tour ===
(key)

CARS Super Late Model Tour results
Year	Team	No.	Make	1	2	3	4	5	6	7	8	CSLMTC	Pts	Ref
2021	Mark Reedy	21	Ford	HCY; 10	GPS	NSH	JEN	HCY	MMS	TCM	SBO	31st	23	

=== SMART Modified Tour ===
SMART Modified Tour results
Year	Car owner	No.	Make	1	2	3	4	5	6	7	8	9	10	11	12	13	14	SMTC	Pts	Ref
2025	Ken Matlach	21CT	N/A	FLO	AND	SBO	ROU	HCY; 8	FCS	CRW	CPS	CAR	CRW	DOM	FCS	TRI	NWS	42nd	33	
2026	Ken Matlach	21CT	N/A	FLO	AND	SBO	DOM	HCY	WKS	FCR	CRW	PUL	CAR	ROU	TRI	NWS; 5		47th	36	
