= Kyle Moyle =

English rugby union player

- Born: Kyle Moyle; 19 January 1993 (age 33) Truro, Cornwall, England
- Height: 1.80 m (5 ft 11 in)
- Weight: 89 kg (14 st 0 lb; 196 lb)
- School: Mounts Bay Academy
- University: Truro and Penwith College

Rugby union career
- Position: Fullback
Amateur team(s)
Years	Team	Apps	(Points)
- Pirates Amateurs
–	Penzance and Newlyn		
–	St Ives		
–	Cornish All Blacks		
- Correct as of 21 January 2021
Senior career
Years	Team	Apps	(Points)
2012–2020	Cornish Pirates	108	(228)
2020–	Gloucester	6	(0)
- Correct as of 21 January 2021

Kyle Moyle (born 19 January 1993) is an English rugby union player who competes for Gloucester in the Premiership Rugby. His main position is a fullback.

Moyle started early in his senior rugby career playing for the Pirates Amateurs, St. Ives, and then, in 2011/12, the Cornish All Blacks, which was the same season he received the Cornwall U20s 'Player of the Year' award.

During the 2012–13 season, Moyle was signed by Cornish Pirates in the RFU Championship following a successful trial. He made his debut in the 2012–13 British and Irish Cup winning 30–10 against Welsh club Swansea. This marks the first time Cornish Pirates won a game in Wales since 1949. Injuries have at times disrupted his progress, but he has scored some super tries. He was the 'Try of the Season' award winner in both 2014 and 2016.

Impressing playing mainly at full-back through the 2017/18 and 2018/19 seasons, with his try-scoring exploits also again on show, he suffered a serious knee injury away to Ealing Trailfinders in the semi-final of the RFU Championship Cup. However, he still picked up both the 'Player of the Year' and the 'Supporters Player of the Year' awards for a second year running. Since returning to action from December 2019, Moyle was also selected in The Rugby Paper's Championship 'Dream XV' for the 2019–20 season.

On 8 November 2020, Moyle signed for Premiership side Gloucester on a short-term loan, with fellow Pirates teammate Jay Tyack until January 2021. However, after several impressing performances for the side, Moyle signed a permanent deal to stay with Gloucester on an undisclosed length deal.
