= Chris Elder (rugby union) =

English rugby union player

- Born: 12 June 1992 (age 34) slough
- Height: 1.94 m (6 ft 4 1/2 in)
- Weight: 109 kg (17 st 2 lb)

Rugby union career
- Position: Fullback
- Current team: Yorkshire Carnegie
Senior career
| Years | Team | Apps | (Points) |
| 2011-2012 | Henley Hawks | 2 | |
| 2012-2013 | Esher Rugby Football Club | 26 | (92) |
| 2013-2014 | Plymouth Albion RFC | 30 | (49) |
| 2014−17 | London Welsh | 45 | (61) |
| 2016− | Yorkshire Carnegie | 22 | (70) |

Chris Elder is a rugby union championship player for Yorkshire Carnegie having played for Esher and Plymouth Albion.
