= Will Harries =

Wales international rugby union player

- Born: William Thomas Morgan Harries; 30 March 1987 (age 39) Cardiff, Wales
- Height: 173 cm (5 ft 8 in)
- Weight: 84 kg (13 st 3 lb)
- School: Millfield School
- University: Loughborough University

Rugby union career
- Position(s): Wing, Fullback
Senior career
Years	Team	Apps	(Points)
2006–2009	Northampton	6	(5)
2008–2009	→ Bedford	24	(60)
2009–2014	Dragons	97	(105)
2014–2019	Ealing	56	(115)
International career
Years	Team	Apps	(Points)
2010–2012	Wales	3	(0)
National sevens team
Years	Team		Comps
2008–2015	Wales 7s		

Will Harries (born 30 March 1987) is a Welsh former international rugby union player. A wing or fullback, he played for the Northampton Saints, Bedford Blues, Newport Gwent Dragons, and most recently Ealing Trailfinders.

== Professional career ==
Harries was educated at The Cathedral School, Llandaff and Millfield, a school known for its rugby tradition. Harries was part of the Northampton Saints Senior Academy, and made his first competitive appearance against Saracens on 18 November 2006. He featured in the Premiership A league, and five fixtures in the following season, while the Saints were relegated to League 1. For the 2008–09 season, Harries was loaned to Bedford Blues to gain further experience. Harries was released at the end of the season.

In 2008, Harries was first selected for the Wales national rugby sevens team squad, appearing in the IRB Sevens.

On 1 July 2009, it was announced that Harries would join the Newport Gwent Dragons. He appeared in a LV Cup game against the Saracens for the Dragons in January 2010, in which he scored 2 tries and was named Man of the Match. During his first season with the Dragons, Harries scored eight tries, including a hat trick against Edinburgh.

In May 2010 he was added to the Wales national rugby union team standby list for the summer matches and subsequently called into the full squad due to injury to Shane Williams. He made his international debut against New Zealand in Hamilton on 26 June 2010.

Following on from his debut, Harries was named in the squad for the 2010 end-of-year rugby union internationals. On 6 November 2010 he made his first international start, against Australia. This was his only appearance of the autumn, Wales opting to give George North his international debut the following week. Harries was not selected in the squad for the 2011 Six Nations Championship. At the end of the season, Harries suffered a substantial knee injury, ruling him out of remainder of the season, as well as the 2011 Rugby World Cup.

Harries returned to the Welsh squad in May 2012, and came off the bench in a capped match against the Barbarians. Harries did not travel with the squad to Australia, and this was to be his last cap for Wales.

He left Newport Gwent Dragons at the end of the 2013–14 season and was selected in the Wales Sevens squad for the 2014 Commonwealth Games, as they fell just short of a semi finals appearance.

After finishing the Commonwealth Games, Harries joined Championship team Ealing Trailfinders, where he spent five seasons. In 2019, he retired from professional rugby and alongside work, joined semi professional Chinnor RFC.
