= Alun Walker =

Scottish rugby union player

- Born: Alun Walker; 28 September 1990 (age 36)
- Height: 1.80 m (5 ft 11 in)
- Weight: 106 kg (16 st 10 lb)
- School: Musselburgh Grammar School; North Berwick High School

Rugby union career
- Position: Hooker
- Current team: Ealing
Amateur team(s)
Years	Team	Apps	(Points)
- Musselburgh RFC
–	Currie RFC		
Senior career
Years	Team	Apps	(Points)
2010–2014	Edinburgh	15	(5)
2013–2014	Nottingham	19	(1)
2014–2023	Ealing Trailfinders		
2023–	Chinnor		
- Correct as of 15 August 2017
International career
Years	Team	Apps	(Points)
- Scotland U20
–	Scotland U19		
–	Scotland U18		

Alun Walker (born 28 September 1990) is a Scottish rugby union player who plays for Chinnor RFC, having played for Ealing Trailfinders in the RFU Championship for many years.

Walker represented Scotland at U18, U19 and U20 level. He regularly benched for Edinburgh in the second half of the 2010–11 season. He is in the second year of a degree course in Sports and Exercise Science at Heriot-Watt University.

He spent 2013-14 on loan at Nottingham, during which time he played in both matches against Ealing Trailfinders.

He then joined the Trailfinders on a two-year contract from Edinburgh in 2014. He captained the team in his first appearance, in a pre-season match against Newport, then played five matches and scored one try before his season was curtailed by a knee injury. During the 2015-16 season, he made 17 appearances and scored five tries. He was first-choice hooker during the 2016-17 season, scoring eight tries in 20 appearances, including two hat-tricks.

Walker has also played for Melrose and Currie.
