= Trailfinders Sports Ground =

Rugby ground in London, England

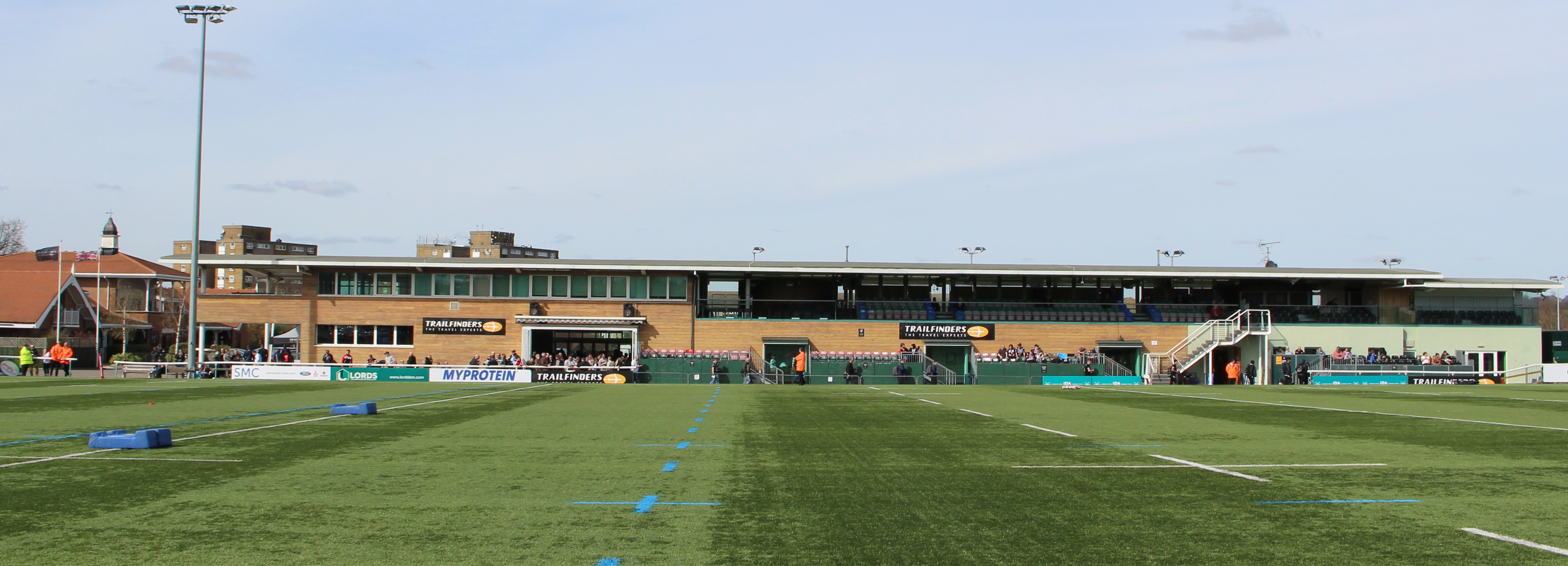
- Interactive map of Trailfinders Sports Ground
- Location: Castle Bar, Vallis Way, West Ealing, London W13 0DD
- Coordinates: 51°31′30″N 0°19′49″W
- Owner: Trailfinders
- Operator: Trailfinders Sports Club
- Capacity: 5,388 (2,779 seats)
- Surface: Rhino-Turf VT60
- Field size: 115 x 76 yards
- Public transit: Castle Bar Park

Construction
- Built: 1999
- Opened: 1999

Tenants
- Ealing Trailfinders Rugby Club (1999-present); London Broncos (2016-2021); Ealing Trailfinders Women (2023-present)

Website
- Trailfinders Sports Club

Trailfinders Sports Ground (TFSG) is a rugby ground in West Ealing, London, England, which is the home of Ealing Trailfinders rugby union. London Broncos rugby league club spent one final season at the ground, having been based at TFSG on a permanent basis between 2016 and 2020.

== Records ==
On 20 August 2016, London Broncos hosted 10 times Super League champions Leeds attracting a then record rugby league crowd at the ground of 1,845. It was also the first ever televised sports match at the ground, with Sky Sports broadcasting the game.

On 2 September 2019, London Broncos set a new rugby league attendance record at the ground when a crowd of 3,051 watched Broncos host Leeds Rhinos

On 4 May 2019, Ealing Trailfinders set the record attendance for a rugby union match at TFSG hosting London Irish in the RFU Championship Cup final, attracting 3,627 which is currently the record overall attendance at the ground.

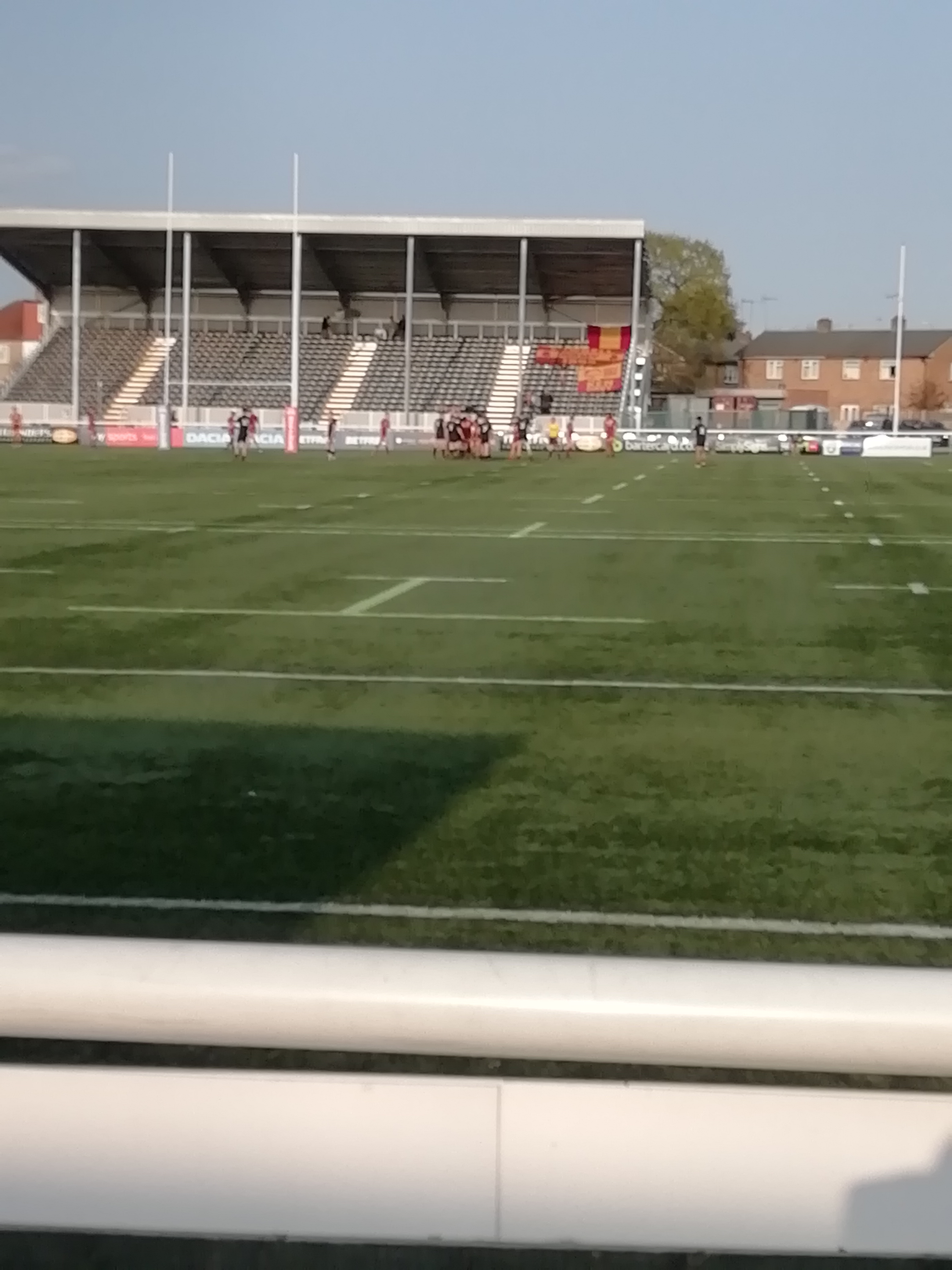
New stand

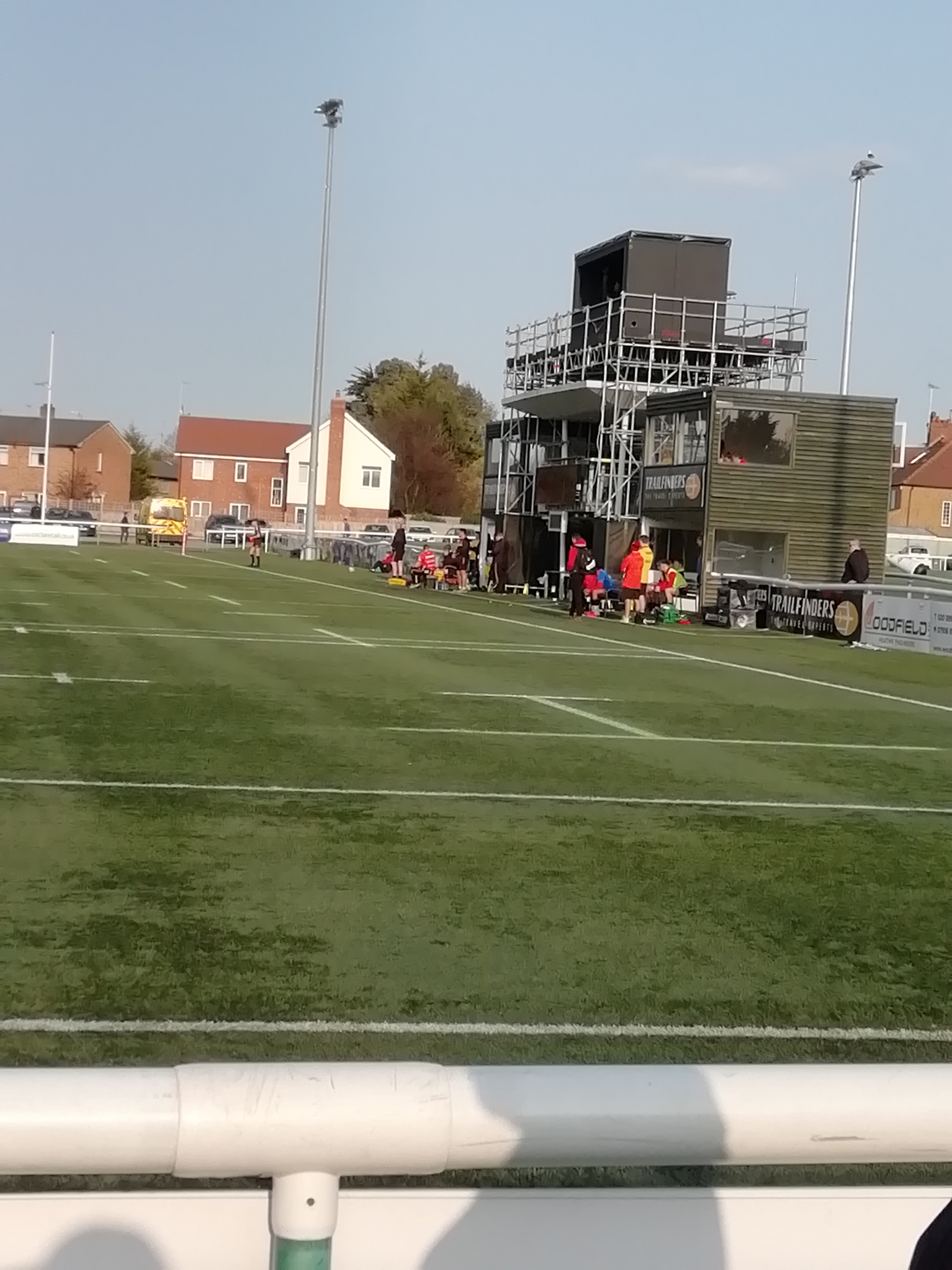
Coaching boxes and TV gantry
