= 2019–20 RFU Championship Cup =

Tournament details
- Countries: England Jersey
- Tournament format(s): Round-robin and knockout
- Date: 20 September 2019 — 23 February 2020

Tournament statistics
- Teams: 12
- Matches played: 40
- Attendance: 51,035 (1,276 per match)
- Highest attendance: 3,818; Newcastle Falcons v Hartpury; 29 November 2019
- Lowest attendance: 247; Ampthill v Ealing Trailfinders; 7 December 2019
- Tries scored: 309 (7.73 per match)
- Top point scorer(s): (England) Craig Willis (Ealing Trailfinders); 57 points
- Top try scorer(s): (England) Alex O'Meara (Cornish Pirates); 8 tries

Final

The 2019–20 RFU Championship Cup was the second season of the annual rugby union Championship Cup competition for second tier, professional English clubs playing in the RFU Championship.

The competition ended without a winner after the quarter-final stage due to the premature end of the RFU Championship season due to the 2019–20 coronavirus pandemic in the United Kingdom.

== Competition format ==
The competition format is a pool stage followed by a knockout stage. The pool stage consists of three pool of four teams each playing home and away matches. Pool matches ran from September through to December, on weekends when there is no RFU Championship league fixtures. In the inaugural season, the RFU had set out the pools in a regional format to encourage derby games, but this year's competition format was more loosely structured.

The top two sides in each pool, plus the two best third placed teams, progressed to the knockout stage, with the best ranked sides getting home advantage in the quarter-finals. The semi-finals and final were cancelled.

== Participating teams and locations ==
| Team | Ground | Capacity | City/Area |
|---|---|---|---|
| Ampthill | Dillingham Park | 3,000 | Ampthill, Bedfordshire |
| Bedford Blues | Goldington Road | 5,000 (1,700 seats) | Bedford, Bedfordshire |
| Cornish Pirates | Mennaye Field | 4,000 (2,200 seats) | Penzance, Cornwall |
| Coventry | Butts Park Arena | 4,000 (3,000 seats) | Coventry, West Midlands |
| Doncaster Knights | Castle Park | 5,000 (1,650 seats) | Doncaster, South Yorkshire |
| Ealing Trailfinders | Trailfinders Sports Ground | 4,000 (2,200 seats) | West Ealing, London |
| Hartpury | Gillman's Ground | 2,000 | Hartpury, Gloucestershire |
| Jersey Reds | Stade Santander International | 4,000 | Saint Peter, Jersey |
| London Scottish | Athletic Ground | 4,500 (1,000 seats) | Richmond, London, London |
| Newcastle Falcons | Kingston Park | 10,500 | Newcastle-upon-Tyne, Tyne and Wear |
| Nottingham | Lady Bay Sports Ground | 3,500 | Nottingham, Nottinghamshire |
| Yorkshire Carnegie | The Sycamores (Note: Yorkshire Carnegie held all their cup games at the home ground of West Park Leeds - The Sycamores - instead of their usual ground at Emerald Headingley Stadium.) | N/A | Bramhope, West Yorkshire |

Locations of the 2019–20 RFU Championship Cup teams(color by pool)

== Pool stage ==
=== Pool 1 ===
Pool 1
| | Club | Played | Won | Drawn | Lost | Points For | Points Against | Points Difference | Tries For | Tries Against | Try Bonus | Losing Bonus | Points |
| 1 | Ealing Trailfinders (Q) | 6 | 6 | 0 | 0 | 282 | 107 | 175 | 40 | 14 | 4 | 0 | 28 |
| 2 | Coventry (Q) | 6 | 4 | 0 | 2 | 210 | 150 | 60 | 30 | 21 | 3 | 1 | 20 |
| 3 | Ampthill | 6 | 2 | 0 | 4 | 112 | 204 | -92 | 16 | 31 | 2 | 1 | 11 |
| 4 | Bedford Blues | 6 | 0 | 0 | 6 | 98 | 242 | -144 | 12 | 32 | 1 | 1 | 2 |
If teams are level at any stage, tiebreakers are applied in the following order: 1. Number of matches won 2. Total number of tries scored 3. Total number of points for 4. Difference between points for and against 5. Fewest red cards 6. Coin toss
Green background means the club has qualified for the quarter-finals as either pool winner or best runner-up. Blue background means the club has qualified for the quarter-finals as runner up or one of two best 3rd placed sides. Updated: 14 December 2019; Source: "Championship Cup 2019-20". englandrugby.com.

==== Round 1 ====
21 September 2019
15:00

| Ampthill | 17 – 47 | Coventry (1 BP) |
| Try: Bercis 47' c Lutui 70' c Con: Sharp (2/2) 47', 70'; Pen: Sharp 40' | Report | Try: Denman 4' c Peters 8' c Kessell 13' c Bulumakau 16' c Woolford 23' c Dawidiuk 36' m Nayolo 80' c Con: Jennings (6/7) 4', 8', 13', 16', 23', 80' |

Dillingham Park
Attendance: 813
Referee: Michael Hudson

21 September 2019
15:00

| (1 BP) Bedford Blues | 26 – 57 | Ealing Trailfinders (1 BP) |
| Try: Tapley 36' m Temm 74' c Atkinson 79' c Butler 80'; Con: Leeming (0/1); Coulson (2/2) 74', 80'; Lennon (1/1) 79' | Report | Try: Cordy-Redden 8' m Joseph 13' c Murphy 32' c Tovey (2) 38' m, 80' c Smid (2) 43' c, 67' c Casson 52' m Burns 63' c Con: Willis (4/7) 13', 32', 43', 63'; Shingler (2/2) 68', 80' |

Goldington Road
Attendance: 1,915
Referee: Craig Maxwell-Keys

==== Round 2 ====
28 September 2019
15:00

| Coventry | 26 – 17 | Bedford Blues |
| Try: Dawidiuk 52' c Nayalo 64' c Con: Jennings (1/1) 52'; Maisey (1/1) 64'; Pen: Jennings (3) 6', 12', 23'; Maisey (1) 75' | Report | Try: Temm 46' c Smith 60' c Con: Coulson (2/2) 46', 60'; Pen: Coulson 21' |

Butts Park Arena
Attendance: 2,042
Referee: Tim Wigglesworth

28 September 2019
15:00

| (1 BP) Ealing Trailfinders | 43 – 5 | Ampthill |
| Try: Durutalo 11' c Joseph 14' m Sloan 17' m Tovey 40' c West (2) 64' c, 80' m Johnston 75' c Con: Craig Willis (2/4) 11', 40'; Shingler (2/3) 64', 75' | Report | Try: Foster 30' m |

Trailfinders Sports Ground
Attendance: 530
Referee: Fergus Kirby

==== Round 3 ====
4 October 2019
19:30

| (1 BP) Coventry | 17 – 22 | Ealing Trailfinders |
| Try: Tolmie 13' m Knox 40' m Stokes 67' c Con: Jennings (0/2); Maisey (1/1) 67' | Report | Try: Murphy 6' c Cordy-Redden 11' m Smid 44' c Con: Shingler (2/3) 6', 43'; Pen: Shingler 34' |

Butts Park Arena
Attendance: 2,065
Referee: Hamish Smales

5 October 2019
15:00

| Bedford Blues | 12 – 25 | Ampthill (1 BP) |
| Try: Temm 24' m Worthington 72' c Con: Coulson (1/2) 72' | Report | Try: Aseidu (2) 12' m, 65' m Sage 53' c Lynch 78' m Con: Grimoldby (1/4) 54'; Pen: Grimoldby 36' |

Goldington Road
Attendance: 3,287
Referee: Simon Harding

==== Round 4 ====
30 November 2019
15:00

| (1 BP) Coventry | 64 – 26 | Ampthill (1 BP) |
| Try: Owen 12' c Nutley (2) 16' m, 24' c Flinn (2) 31' m, 45' c Nayalo 41' m Knox 48' c Purdy 63' c Penalty try 69'; Lewis 72' c Con: Fenner (2/4) 13', 25'; Maisey (4/5) 46', 49', 64', 73' | Report | Try: Blackmore 28' c Sage 56' c Baker 75' m Ward 80' c Con: Grimoldby (3/4) 29', 57', 80' |

Butts Park Arena
Attendance: 2,067
Referee: James Clarke

30 November 2019
15:00

| (1 BP) Ealing Trailfinders | 80 – 17 | Bedford Blues |
| Try: Niko (2) 1' m, 38' c Mills 5' c Joseph 11' m Willis 14' c Smid 25' c Bell 31' c Reid 40' c Sloan 42' c Murphy 60' c Hampson 67' c Johnston 70' c Con: Willis (10/12) 5', 14', 25', 31', 38', 40', 42', 60', 67', 70' | Report | Try: Temm (2) 3' c, 50' m Fields 36' m Con: Robling (1/3) 3' |

Trailfinders Sports Ground
Attendance: 630
Referee: Jack Makepeace

==== Round 5 ====
7 December 2019
14:00

| (1 BP) Ampthill | 22 – 24 | Ealing Trailfinders |
| Try: Gillespie 18' m Blackmore 53' c Lutui 66' c Con: Costelow (2/3) 53', 66'; Pen: Costelow 31' | Report | Try: Murphy 2' c Walker 33' c Burns 72' c Con: Willis (3/3) 2', 33', 72'; Pen: Willis 79' |

Dillingham Park
Attendance: 247
Referee: Harry Walbaum

7 December 2019
15:00

| Bedford Blues | 12 – 37 | Coventry (1 BP) |
| Try: Lennon 63' m Reed 80' c Con: Hooley (1/2) 80' | Report | Try: Purdy (2) 12' m, 78' c White 27' m Trimble (2) 40' c, 75' c Con: Jennings (1/3) 40'; Maisey (2/2) 75', 78'; Pen: Jennings 73'; Maisey 77' |

Goldington Road
Attendance: 2,230
Referee: Hamish Smales

==== Round 6 ====
14 December 2019
14:00

| Ampthill | 17 – 14 | Bedford Blues (1 BP) |
| Try: Sutherland 14' c Johnson 78' c Con: Grimoldby (2/2) 15', 79'; Pen: Costelow 39' | Report | Try: Lennon 5' c Penalty try 36'; Con: Hooley (1/1) 6' |

Dillingham Park
Attendance: 2,151
Referee: Simon Harding

14 December 2019
14:00

| (1 BP) Ealing Trailfinders | 56 – 19 | Coventry |
| Try: Reid 3' c Durutolo 11' m Hampson 24' c Bell 35' c Smid 42' c Cordy-Redden 71' m Burns 73' c Murphy 76' m Con: Shingler (5/8) 3', 24', 35', 42', 73'; Pen: Shingler (2) 17', 40' | Report | Try: Trimble 5' c Bulumakau 22' m Ram 66' c Con: Jennings (2/3) 5', 66' |

Trailfinders Sports Ground
Attendance: 788
Referee: Alexander Thomas

=== Pool 2 ===
Pool 2
| | Club | Played | Won | Drawn | Lost | Points For | Points Against | Points Difference | Tries For | Tries Against | Try Bonus | Losing Bonus | Points |
| 1 | Newcastle Falcons (Q) | 6 | 6 | 0 | 0 | 261 | 53 | 208 | 39 | 7 | 5 | 0 | 29 |
| 2 | Jersey Reds (Q) | 6 | 3 | 0 | 3 | 124 | 141 | -17 | 14 | 17 | 4 | 1 | 17 |
| 3 | Doncaster Knights (Q) | 6 | 2 | 0 | 4 | 131 | 212 | -81 | 19 | 30 | 3 | 0 | 11 |
| 4 | Hartpury | 6 | 1 | 0 | 5 | 116 | 227 | -111 | 14 | 35 | 1 | 0 | 5 |
If teams are level at any stage, tiebreakers are applied in the following order: 1. Number of matches won 2. Total number of tries scored 3. Difference between points for and against 4. Total number of points for 5. Fewest red cards 6. Coin toss
Green background means the club has qualified for the quarter-finals as either pool winner or best runner-up. Blue background means the club has qualified for the quarter-finals as runner up or one of two best 3rd placed sides. Updated: 14 December 2019; Source: "Championship Cup 2019-20". englandrugby.com.

==== Round 1 ====
21 September 2019
14:30

| (1 BP) Doncaster Knights | 44 – 22 | Hartpury |
| Try: Lucock 1' c Lewis 17'; James 52' m Smith 65' c Wilson 70' m Eames 77' c Con: Olver (3/5) 1', 17', 65'; Foley (1/1) 77'; Pen: Olver (2) 10', 40' | Report | Try: Koster 21' m Chamberlain 38' c Jubb 80' c Con: Chamberlain (1/2) 38'; Bragman (1/1) 80'; Pen: Chamberlain 13' |

Castle Park
Attendance: 730
Referee: Neil Chivers

21 September 2019
15:00

| Jersey Reds | 8 – 21 | Newcastle Falcons |
| Try: Homer 71' m Con: Dyer (0/1); Pen: Dyer 22' | Report | Try: Wacokecoke (2) 61' c, 75' m Con: Flood (1/2) 61'; Pen: Flood (3) 5', 19', 57' |

Stade Santander International
Attendance: 1,203
Referee: Matt Turvey

==== Round 2 ====
28 September 2019
14:00

| Hartpury | 13 – 24 | Jersey Reds (1 BP) |
| Try: Tanner 39' m Safe 78' m Con: Bragman (0/2); Pen: Bragman 14' | Report | Try: Williams (2) 23' m, 58' c Slowik 29' c Van Dam 48' m Con: Dyer (2/4) 29', 58' |

Gillman's Ground
Attendance: 762
Referee: Anthony Woodthorpe

29 September 2019
15:00

| (1 BP) Newcastle Falcons | 57 – 0 | Doncaster Knights |
| Try: Radwan (2) 9' m, 18' m Blamire 28' c Ah You 35' c Robinson (2) 42' c, 53' m Wacokecoke 49' c Cooper 76' c Chick 80' c Con: Flood (4/7) 28', 35', 42', 49'; Connon (2/2) 76', 80' | Report |

Kingston Park
Attendance: 3,577
Referee: Andrew Jackson

==== Round 3 ====
5 October 2019
14:30

| (1 BP) Doncaster Knights | 32 – 26 | Jersey Reds (2 BP) |
| Try: McPhillips 12' c Foley 20' m Challinor 64' c James 70' c Con: Olver (3/4) 12', 64', 70'; Pen: Olver (2) 42', 80' | Report | Try: Homer 3' c Van Dam 47' m Hatherell 53' c Harris 76' c Con: Dyer (2/3) 3', 53'; Cope (1/1) 76' |

Castle Park
Attendance: 873
Referee: Jack Makepeace

5 October 2019
14:30

| Hartpury | 14 – 52 | Newcastle Falcons |
| Try: Margetts 28' c Qera 40' c Con: Bragman (2/2) 28', 40' | Report | Try: Stuart 11' c Hodgson (2) 16' c, 53' m Stevenson 23' c Cooper 36' m Wacokecoke 50' c Uzokwe 71' c Penny 74' c Con: Hodgson (4/6) 11', 16', 23', 50'; Connon (2/2) 71', 74' |

Gillman's Ground
Attendance: 815
Referee: Ian Tempest

==== Round 4 ====
29 November 2019
19:45

| (1 BP) Newcastle Falcons | 50 – 10 | Hartpury |
| Try: Vuna 2' m Swiel (2) 10' m, 72' c Blamire 47' m Tait 57' c Matavesi 63' c Stevenson 69' c Farrar 80'+3; Con: Flood (0/2); Hodgson (5/6) 58', 64', 70', 73', 80'+3 | Report | Try: Nagle-Taylor 51' c Con: Morris (1/1) 52'; Pen: Eden 43' |

Kingston Park
Attendance: 3,818
Referee: Hamish Smales

30 November 2019
15:00

| (1 BP) Jersey Reds | 27 – 17 | Doncaster Knights |
| Try: Harris 18' m Morgan 37' m Owen 63' c Cope 69' c Con: Cope (2/4) 63', 69'; Pen: Cope 42' | Report | Try: Challinor 33' c Warr 47' m Sproston 77' m Con: Olver (1/3) 33' |

Stade Santander International
Attendance: 1,023
Referee: Michael Hudson

==== Round 5 ====
7 December 2019
14:30

| Doncaster Knights | 14 – 43 | Newcastle Falcons (1 BP) |
| Try: Penalty try 18'; James 50'; Con: Olver (1/1) 51' | Report | Try: Wacokecoke (3) 3' c, 43' m, 77' c Blamire 40' c McGuigan 56'; Stevenson 64'; Con: Hodgson (4/5) 4', 40'+1, 57', 65'; Connon (1/1) 78'; Pen: Hodgson 22' |

Castle Park
Attendance: 1,468
Referee: Fergus Kirby

7 December 2019
15:00

| (1 BP) Jersey Reds | 33 – 20 | Hartpury |
| Try: Morgan 27' c Slowik 31' c Bainbridge 41'; Macfarlane (2) 60' c, 64' m Con: Cope (4/5) 27', 31', 41', 60' | Report | Try: Margetts 39' c Hinkley 46' c Con: Chamberlain (2/2) 40', 46'; Pen: Chamberlain (2) 8', 32' |

Stade Santander International
Attendance: 805
Referee: Alex Thomas

==== Round 6 ====
14 December 2019
14:00

| (1 BP) Hartpury | 37 – 24 | Doncaster Knights (1 BP) |
| Try: Bragman 29' c Preece 54' m Smith 63' m Nagle-Taylor 76' m Con: Bragman (1/4) 30'; Pen: Bragman (5) 5', 13', 24', 34', 39' | Report | Try: Lewis (2) 37' m, 69'c Quigley 55' c Pitman 74' m Con: Olver (2/4) 55', 69' |

Gillman's Ground
Attendance: 847
Referee: Ben Russell

14 December 2019
14:00

| (1 BP) Newcastle Falcons | 38 – 7 | Jersey Reds |
| Try: Robinson (2) 7' c, 26' m McGuigan 36' c Matavesi 39' c Stevenson 45' m Blamire 80' c Con: Flood (3/5) 8', 37', 40'; Hodgson (1/1) 80'+1 | Report | Try: Harris 73' c Con: Dyer (1/1) 74' |

Kingston Park
Attendance: 3,571
Referee: Neil Chivers

=== Pool 3 ===
Pool 3
| | Club | Played | Won | Drawn | Lost | Points For | Points Against | Points Difference | Tries For | Tries Against | Try Bonus | Losing Bonus | Points |
| 1 | Nottingham (Q) | 6 | 4 | 0 | 2 | 227 | 89 | 138 | 34 | 12 | 4 | 1 | 21 |
| 2 | Cornish Pirates (Q) | 6 | 4 | 0 | 2 | 213 | 79 | 134 | 29 | 11 | 4 | 1 | 21 |
| 3 | London Scottish (Q) | 6 | 4 | 0 | 2 | 168 | 121 | 47 | 27 | 17 | 3 | 0 | 19 |
| 4 | Yorkshire Carnegie | 6 | 0 | 0 | 6 | 19 | 338 | -319 | 3 | 53 | 0 | 0 | 0 |
If teams are level at any stage, tiebreakers are applied in the following order: 1. Number of matches won 2. Total number of tries scored 3. Total number of points for 4. Difference between points for and against 5. Fewest red cards 6. Coin toss
Green background means the club has qualified for the quarter-finals as either pool winner or best runner-up. Blue background means the club has qualified for the quarter-finals as runner up or one of two best 3rd placed sides. Updated: 14 December 2019; Source: "Championship Cup 2019-20". englandrugby.com.

==== Round 1 ====
20 September 2019
19:45

| (1 BP) Nottingham | 83 – 0 | Yorkshire Carnegie |
| Try: Williams 5' c Qualter 8' c Foley (3) 12' c, 21' c, 54' m Peters 18' c Farnworth 48' m Scanlon (2) 32' c, 49' m Connolly 64' c Strong 66' c Clark 69' m Stephenson 79' c Con: Millett (6/9) 5', 8', 12', 18', 21', 32'; Dolly (3/4) 64', 66, 79' | Report |

Lady Bay Sports Ground
Attendance: 728
Referee: Hamish Smales

21 September 2019
15:00

| London Scottish | 24 – 20 | Cornish Pirates (1 BP) |
| Try: Wynne 20' c Ingall 57' c Barton 70' c Con: Barnes (3/3) 21', 58', 71'; Pen: Barnes 78' | Report | Try: O'Meara (2) 15' c, 73' m AJ Cant 73' m Con: Cargill (1/3) 16'; Pen: Cargill 50' |

Athletic Ground
Attendance: 707
Referee: Tom Foley

==== Round 2 ====
28 September 2019
14:30

| Yorkshire Carnegie | 0 – 48 | Cornish Pirates (1 BP) |
| | Report | Try: Patterson (3) 15' c, 37' c, 60' c Bruzulier 23' m Walker 46' c Wilson 68' c Cowan Dickie 80' m Con: Alvarez (5/7) 16', 38', 47', 61', 69'; Pen: Alvarez 2' |

The Sycamores, Bramhope
Attendance: 248
Referee: Neil Chivers

28 September 2019
15:00

| (1 BP) London Scottish | 22 – 17 | Nottingham (1 BP) |
| Try: Hibberd 19' m Mikalcius (2) 30' m, 36' m Toolis 43' c Con: Barnes (1/4) 43' | Report | Try: Foley 12' c Peters 58' c Con: Dolly (2/2) 15', 58'; Pen: Stephenson 80' |

Athletic Ground
Attendance: 502
Referee: Craig Maxwell-Keys

==== Round 3 ====
4 October 2019
19:45

| (1 BP) London Scottish | 50 – 7 | Yorkshire Carnegie |
| Try: Wynne 4' m Jurevicius 12' c Eliet (3) 22' c, 25' c, 42' c Harris 35' c Hibberd 57' c Stevenson 77' m Con: Sheppard (5/8) 12', 22', 25', 35', 57' | | Try: Lavin 55' c Con: Carlisle (1/1) 55' |

Athletic Ground
Attendance: 578
Referee: George Selwood

4 October 2019
19:45

| Nottingham | 7 – 42 | Cornish Pirates (1 BP) |
| Try: Graham 44' c Con: Tom Stephenson (1/1) 44' | Report | Try: O'Meara (4) 15' m, 38' c, 51' c, 72' c Wilson 32' c Con: Alvarez (3/4) 33', 39', 52'; Cargill (1/1) 73'; Pen: Alvarez (3) 2', 3', 27' |

Lady Bay Sports Ground
Attendance: 816
Referee: Matt Turvey

==== Round 4 ====
30 November 2019
15:00

| Yorkshire Carnegie | 7 – 53 | London Scottish (1 BP) |
| Try: Lawson 45' c Con: Shaw (1/1) 46' | | Try: Gordon (2) 6' m, 79 c Magie 11' m Eliet 14' c Stevenson (2) 20' m, 76' m Smith 27' c Beattie 49' m Bright 57' c Con: Magie (2/5) 15', 28'; Sheppard (2/4) 57', 80' |

The Sycamores, Bramhope
Attendance: 450
Referee: Alex Thomas

1 December 2019
14:30

| Cornish Pirates | 20 – 29 | Nottingham (1 BP) |
| Try: Frost 14' c Davey 18' c Con: Cargill (2/2) 15', 19'; Pen: Cargill (2) 8', 43' | Report | Try: Brownlie 4' c Spittle 27' c Strong 45' m Williams 65' c Con: O'Leary (3/4) 5', 28', 60'; Pen: O'Leary 80' |

Mennaye Field
Attendance: 1,079
Referee: Joe James

==== Round 5 ====
8 December 2019
14:30

| (1 BP) Cornish Pirates | 54 – 5 | Yorkshire Carnegie |
| Try: O'Meara (2) 2' c, 36' m Wedlake 14' c Frost 41' c Walker 43' c McRae 66' c Alvarez 69' c Evans 80' c Con: Cargill (4/5) 3', 14', 42', 54'; Alvarez (3/3) 66', 69', 80' | Report | Try: Lancaster 11' m Con: Shaw (0/1) |

Mennaye Field
Attendance: 843
Referee: Nick Wood

8 December 2019
15:00

| (1 BP) Nottingham | 41 – 5 | London Scottish |
| Try: McConnell 2' c Brownlie (2) 12' m, 41' m Scanlon (2) 19' c, 62'; Chessum 67'; Con: O'Leary (4/6) 3', 19', 64', 67'; Pen: O'Leary (1/1) 50' | Report | Try: Stevenson 31' m Con: Magie (0/1) |

Lady Bay Sports Ground
Attendance: 871
Referee: Dean Richards

==== Round 6 ====
14 December 2019
14:00

| (1 BP) Cornish Pirates | 29 – 14 | London Scottish |
| Try: McRae 22' c Cowan-Dickie 28' c Andrew 58' c Wedlake 64' m Con: Alvarez (2/2) 23', 29'; Cargill (1/2) 59'; Pen: Cargill 80' | Report | Try: Magie 8' c Stevenson 11' c Con: Magie (2/2) 9', 12' |

Mennaye Field
Attendance: 1,299
Referee: Charles Gayther

14 December 2019
14:00

| Yorkshire Carnegie | 0 – 50 | Nottingham (1 BP) |
| | Report | Try: Poullet 11' c Cecil 27' m Peters 35' c Cole 65' c Spittle 70' m Millet 74' c Williams 78' m Betts 80' c Con: Millett (2/2) 11', 35'; Dolly (0/1); O'Leary (3/5) 65', 74', 80' |

The Sycamores, Bramhope
Attendance: 450
Referee: Greg MacDonald

== Knock-out stage ==
The eight qualifiers are seeded according to performance in the pool stage - with the 3 pool winners making the top 3 seeds along with the best runner up as seed number 4, and the next two runners up and two best 3rd place teams making up the other 4 seeds. The top 4 seeds host the quarter-finals against the lower seeds, in a 1 v 8, 2 v 7, 3 v 6, 4 v 5 format. However, if two teams qualify from the same pool they can not be drawn together.

Teams are ranked by:

1 – competition points (4 for a win, 2 for a draw)
2 – where competition points are equal, greatest number of wins
3 – where the number of wins are equal, greatest number of tries scored
4 – where the number of tries are equal, greatest number of points scored
4 – where the number of points scored are equal, aggregate points difference
6 – where the aggregate points differences are equal, least red cards
7 – if red cards are equal, then ranking will be decided by the toss of a coin

| Rank | Pool leaders/best runner-up | Pts | Wins | TF | PF | Diff |
|---|---|---|---|---|---|---|
| 1 | Newcastle Falcons | 29 | 6 | 39 | 261 | 208 |
| 2 | Ealing Trailfinders | 28 | 6 | 40 | 282 | 175 |
| 3 | Nottingham | 21 | 4 | 34 | 227 | 138 |
| 4 | Cornish Pirates | 21 | 4 | 29 | 213 | 134 |
| Rank | Pool runners-up/top two 3rd place | Pts | Wins | TF | PF | Diff |
| 5 | Coventry | 20 | 4 | 30 | 210 | 60 |
| 6 | London Scottish | 19 | 4 | 27 | 168 | 47 |
| 7 | Jersey Reds | 17 | 3 | 14 | 124 | -17 |
| 8 | Doncaster Knights | 11 | 2 | 19 | 131 | -81 |
| 9 | Ampthill | 11 | 2 | 16 | 112 | -92 |

Quarter-finals
22 February 2020
Newcastle Falcons | 28
London Scottish | 5
23 February 2020
Cornish Pirates | 47
Coventry | 31
22 February 2020
Ealing Trailfinders | 36
Jersey Reds | 17
21 February 2020
Nottingham | 15
Doncaster Knights | 0

Semi-finals
cancelled
Newcastle Falcons
Cornish Pirates
cancelled
Ealing Trailfinders
Nottingham

Final

=== Quarter-finals ===
21 February 2020
19:45

| Nottingham (3) | 15 – 0 | Doncaster Knights (8) |

Lady Bay Sports Ground
Attendance: 563
Referee: Anthony Woodthorpe

22 February 2020
15:00

| Ealing Trailfinders (2) | 36 – 17 | Jersey Reds (7) |
| | Report |

Trailfinders Sports Ground
Attendance: 526
Referee: Hamish Smales

22 February 2020
15:00

| Newcastle Falcons (1) | 28 – 5 | London Scottish (6) |
| | Report |

Kingston Park
Attendance: 2,003
Referee: Andrew Jackson

23 February 2020
12:30

| Cornish Pirates (4) | 47 – 31 | Coventry (5) |
| | Report |

Mennaye Field
Attendance: 1,115
Referee: Dean Richards

== Attendances ==
| Club | Home matches | Total | Average | Highest | Lowest | % Capacity |
|---|---|---|---|---|---|---|
| Ampthill | 3 | 3,211 | 1,070 | 2,151 | 247 | 36% |
| Bedford Blues | 3 | 7,432 | 2,477 | 3,287 | 1,915 | 50% |
| Cornish Pirates | 4 | 4,336 | 1,084 | 1,299 | 843 | 27% |
| Coventry | 3 | 6,174 | 2,058 | 2,067 | 2,042 | 51% |
| Doncaster Knights | 3 | 3,071 | 1,024 | 1,468 | 730 | 20% |
| Ealing Trailfinders | 4 | 2,474 | 619 | 788 | 526 | 15% |
| Hartpury | 3 | 2,424 | 808 | 847 | 762 | 40% |
| Jersey Reds | 3 | 3,031 | 1,010 | 1,203 | 805 | 25% |
| London Scottish | 3 | 1,787 | 596 | 707 | 502 | 13% |
| Newcastle Falcons | 4 | 12,969 | 3,242 | 3,818 | 2,003 | 32% |
| Nottingham | 4 | 2,978 | 745 | 871 | 563 | 21% |
| Yorkshire Carnegie | 3 | 1,148 | 383 | 450 | 248 | |

== Individual statistics ==
- Points scorers includes tries as well as conversions, penalties and drop goals. Appearance figures also include coming on as substitutes (unused substitutes not included).

=== Top points scorers ===
| Rank | Player | Team | Appearances | Points |
|---|---|---|---|---|
| 1 | (England) Craig Willis | Ealing Trailfinders | 7 | 57 |
| 2 | (England) Will Cargill | Cornish Pirates | 6 | 52 |
| 3 | (Argentina) Javier Rojas Alvarez | Cornish Pirates | 7 | 43 |
| 4 | (England) Joel Hodgson | Newcastle Falcons | 7 | 41 |
| 5 | (England) Alex O'Meara | Cornish Pirates | 4 | 40 |
| 6 | (England) Will Maisey | Coventry | 7 | 38 |
| 7 | (England) George Wacokecoke | Newcastle Falcons | 5 | 35 |
| 8 | (England) Toby Flood | Newcastle Falcons | 5 | 33 |
| 9 | (England) Rory Jennings | Coventry | 6 | 32 |
| 10 | (England) Joshua Bragman | Hartpury | 4 | 31 |
| 10 | (Canada) Shane O'Leary | Nottingham | 4 | 31 |
| 10 | (Wales) Steven Shingler | Ealing Trailfinders | 4 | 31 |

=== Top try scorers ===
| Rank | Player | Team | Appearances | Tries |
|---|---|---|---|---|
| 1 | (England) Alex O'Meara | Cornish Pirates | 4 | 8 |
| 2 | (England) George Wacokecoke | Newcastle Falcons | 5 | 7 |
| 3 | (Wales) Rob Stevenson | London Scottish | 5 | 5 |
| 3 | (New Zealand) Dan Temm | Bedford Blues | 5 | 5 |
| 3 | (England) Jamie Blamire | Newcastle Falcons | 6 | 5 |
| 3 | (Wales) Kieran Murphy | Ealing Trailfinders | 7 | 5 |
| 3 | (South Africa) Rayn Smid | Ealing Trailfinders | 7 | 5 |
| 4 | (England) Adam Radwan | Newcastle Falcons | 4 | 4 |
| 4 | (England) Ben Foley | Nottingham | 5 | 4 |
| 4 | (England) Sean Robinson | Newcastle Falcons | 5 | 4 |
| 4 | (Ireland) Seán Scanlon | Nottingham | 5 | 4 |
| 4 | (New Zealand) Antonio Harris | Jersey Reds | 6 | 4 |
| 4 | (Fiji) Senitiki Nayalo | Coventry | 6 | 4 |
| 4 | (England) Ben Stevenson | Newcastle Falcons | 6 | 4 |
| 4 | (England) Matt Eliet | London Scottish | 7 | 4 |
| 4 | (England) Reon Joseph | Ealing Trailfinders | 7 | 4 |

== Season records ==
=== Team ===
Largest home win — 83 points

83 – 0 Nottingham at home to Yorkshire Carnegie on 20 September 2019

Largest away win — 50 points

50 – 0 Nottingham away to Yorkshire Carnegie on 14 December 2019

Most points scored — 83 points

83 – 0 Nottingham at home to Yorkshire Carnegie on 20 September 2019

Most tries in a match — 13

Nottingham at home to Yorkshire Carnegie on 20 September 2019

Most conversions in a match — 10

Ealing Trailfinders at home to Bedford Blues on 30 November 2019

Most penalties in a match — 5

Hartpury at home to Doncaster Knights on 14 December 2019

Most drop goals in a match — 0

=== Player ===
Most points in a match — 25

(England) Craig Willis for Ealing Trailfinders at home to Bedford Blues on 30 November 2019

Most tries in a match — 4

(England) Alex O'Meara for Cornish Pirates away to Nottingham on 4 October 2019

Most conversions in a match — 10

(England) Craig Willis for Ealing Trailfinders at home to Bedford Blues on 30 November 2019

Most penalties in a match — 5

(England) Josh Bragman for Hartpury at home to Doncaster Knights on 14 December 2019

Most drop goals in a match — 0

=== Attendances ===
Highest — 3,818

Newcastle Falcons at home to Hartpury on 29 November 2019

Lowest — 247

Ampthill at home to Ealing Trailfinders on 7 December 2019

Highest average attendance — 3,242

Newcastle Falcons

Lowest average attendance — 383

Yorkshire Carnegie

== See also ==
- RFU Championship
- British and Irish Cup
- 2019–20 Premiership Rugby Cup
- English rugby union system
- List of English rugby union teams
- Rugby union in England
