= 1975–76 John Player Cup =

English rugby cup

Tournament statistics

The 1975–76 John Player Cup was the fifth edition of England's premier rugby union club competition at the time. Gosforth won the competition defeating Rosslyn Park in the final. In the final Bob Mordell of Rosslyn Park punched Dave Robinson and was sent off after only ten minutes of the game. The event was sponsored for the first time by John Player cigarettes and the final was held at Twickenham Stadium.

== Draw and results ==
=== First round ===
Team one	Team two	Score
London Welsh	Richmond	21-6
Orrell	Sale	9-15
Maidenhead RFC	Wakefield	0-20
Liverpool	Leicester	10-7
Havant	Thurrock	12-4
London Irish	Saracens	16-3
Rosslyn Park	Marlow	41-3
London Scottish	Wasps	19-0
Kettering	Coventry	12-20
Plymouth Albion	Gloucester	3-9
Moseley	Nottingham	25-12
Gosforth	Hartlepool Rovers	35-9
Headingley	Roundhay	4-6
Bath	Bristol	15-24
Penryn	St Luke's College	32-7
Northampton	Bedford	9-6

=== Second round ===
Team one	Team two	Score
London Welsh	Coventry	13-9
Sale	Gloucester	16-15
Wakefield	Moseley	10-9
Liverpool	Gosforth	12-19
Havant	Roundhay	3-24
London Irish	Bristol	3-14
Rosslyn Park	Penryn	39-3
London Scottish	Northampton	16-28

=== Quarter-finals ===
Team one	Team two	Score
Sale	London Welsh	16-14
Roundhay	Gosforth	3-14
Wakefield	Northampton	12-6
Bristol	Rosslyn Park	12-16

=== Semi-finals ===
Team one	Team two	Score
Sale	Gosforth	3-12
Rosslyn Park	Wakefield	12-6

=== Final ===
24 April 1976

Gosforth	23–14	Rosslyn Park
Try: Brian Patrick; Terry Roberts; Steve Gustard; Dave Robinson; Con: Malcolm Young (2); Pen: Malcolm Young		Try: Andy Ripley; Mike Bulpitt; Drop: Charles Ralston

Twickenham Stadium, London
Attendance: 7,500
Referee: Norman Sanson (Berkshire)

1	Brian Patrick
2	S M Griffin
3	Ken Britten
4	Harry Patrick
5	Steve Gustard
6	Richard Breakey
7	Malcolm Young (c)
8	Peter Dixon
9	A J Preston
10	Terry Roberts
11	John Short
12	Dave Robinson
13	Andy Cutter
14	Duncan Madsen
15	Colin White
Replacements:
16	Phil Levinson for Colin White (21m)
Coach:
Jack Rowell

1	Phil Treseder
2	Mike Bulpitt
3	Charles Kent
4	Steve Fluskey
5	Jim Moyes
6	Charles Ralston
7	Lionel Weston
8	Andy Ripley
9	Bob Mordell
10	Tony Rodgers
11	Neil Mantell
12	Dave Starling
13	Paddy Hinton
14	Phil Keith-Roach (c)
15	George Lloyd-Roberts
Replacements:
16	Les Byrne for Phil Treseder (33m)
Coach:
Peter Berryman / Glen Robertson
