= 1976–77 John Player Cup =

English rugby cup

Tournament statistics

The 1976–77 John Player Cup was the sixth edition of England's premier rugby union club competition at the time. Gosforth won the competition for the second consecutive year defeating Waterloo in the final. The event was sponsored by John Player cigarettes and the final was held at Twickenham Stadium.

== Draw and results ==
=== First round ===
Team one	Team two	Score
Bedford	Hartlepool Rovers	17-10
Fylde	Solihull	20-10
Harlequins	Gloucester	9-17
Gosforth	Coventry	12-6
London Welsh	Bath	18-3
Moseley	Sale	13-3
Saracens	Maidenhead RFC	8-0
Waterloo	London Irish	12-9
Exeter	Rosslyn Park	6-25
Weston-super-Mare	Gordon League RFC	0-15
Esher	Bristol	3-15
Salisbury RFC	Fullerians RFC	0-15
Northampton	Widnes RFC	21-10
Wakefield	Leicester	6-17
Richmond	London Scottish	17-3
Middlesbrough	Birmingham	6-3

=== Second round ===
Team one	Team two	Score
Bedford	Rosslyn Park	20-3
Fylde	Gordon League RFC	9-4
Gloucester	Bristol	12-3
Gosforth	Fullerians RFC	48-0
London Welsh	Northampton	17-11
Moseley	Leicester	23-9
Saracens	Richmond	15-7
Waterloo	Middlesbrough	17-10

=== Quarter-finals ===
Team one	Team two	Score
Fylde	Saracens	8-18
Waterloo	Bedford	27-25
Moseley	London Welsh	10-10*
Gosforth	Gloucester	3-0

Progressed as away team*

=== Semi-finals ===
Team one	Team two	Score
London Welsh	Gosforth	12-18
Waterloo	Saracens	11-6

=== Final ===
16 April 1977

Gosforth	27–11	Waterloo
Try: Dave Robinson (2); Peter Dixon; Stuart Archer; John Hedley; Con: Brian Patrick (2); Pen: Brian Patrick		Try: Steve Christopherson; Steve Tickle; Pen: Ian Ball

Twickenham Stadium, London
Attendance: 10,000
Referee: Peter Hughes (Manchester)

15	Brian Patrick
14	Stuart Archer
13	Harry Patrick
12	Ken Britten
11	Steve Gustard
10	Richard Breakey
9	Malcolm Young
8	Roger Uttley (c)
7	Dave Robinson
6	John Hedley
5	Terry Roberts
4	Peter Dixon
3	Andy Cutter
2	Duncan Madsen
1	Colin White
Coach:
Jack Rowell

15	Steve Tickle
14	Nick Spaven
13	G T Jackson
12	Steve Christopherson
11	Mark Flett
10	Ian Ball
9	David Carfoot
8	Laurie Connor
7	K Hancock
6	K F Short
5	M F Billingham
4	K Lunt
3	D Reed
2	Colin Fisher (c)
1	Frank Blackhurst
Coach:
