= Sean Robinson (rugby union, born 1991) =

English rugby union player

- Born: Sean Andrew Robinson; 8 February 1991 (age 35) Greenwich, England
- Height: 1.93 m (6 ft 4 in)
- Weight: 112 kg (17 st 9 lb)

Rugby union career
- Position(s): Lock, Flanker
- Current team: Kyuden Voltex
Senior career
Years	Team	Apps	(Points)
2014–2023	Newcastle Falcons	51	(15)
2023–	Kyuden Voltex	28	(10)
- Correct as of 28 December 2020

Sean Andrew Robinson (born 8 February 1991) is an English rugby union player who played for Newcastle Falcons from 2014 to 2023.

Robinson was educated at King's School, Worcester and Durham University, where he read Physics.
