= Ben Stevenson (rugby union) =

English rugby union player

- Born: Benjamin Thomas Stevenson; 19 July 1998 (age 28) Durham, England
- Height: 1.89 m (6 ft 2 in)
- Weight: 90 kg (14 st 2 lb)
- School: Yarm School
- University: Durham University

Rugby union career
- Position: Wing
- Current team: RC Vannes
Senior career
Years	Team	Apps	(Points)
2016–2025	Newcastle Falcons	92	(140)
2025–	RC Vannes	21	(40)
- Correct as of 10 June 2026

Benjamin Thomas Stevenson (born 19 July 1998) is an English rugby union player who plays for RC Vannes in the French Pro D2 league. He previously played for Newcastle Falcons in Premiership Rugby.

A former pupil of Yarm, Stevenson completed a law degree at Durham University in 2019.
