= George Wacokecoke =

Fijian rugby union player

- Born: Malakai "George" Wacokecoke; 23 October 1995 (age 31) China
- Height: 1.82 m (6 ft 0 in)
- Weight: 94 kg (207 lb; 14 st 11 lb)
- School: St Joseph's College
- University: Northumbria University
- Notable relative: Josaia Wacokecoke

Rugby union career
- Position: Wing
Senior career
Years	Team	Apps	(Points)
- Northampton Saints
2014–2015	Bath	1	(0)
2017–2024	Newcastle Falcons	32	(65)
2024-2026	Doncaster Knights		
2026-	Chinnor		
- Correct as of 20 May 2019
International career
Years	Team	Apps	(Points)
2012	England U18		

Malakai "George" Wacokecoke (born 23 October 1995) is an English professional rugby union footballer. He plays at wing for Chinnor, having previously played for Bath.,Newcastle Falcons and Doncaster Knights.
