= Newcastle Red Bulls =

English rugby union club, based in Newcastle upon Tyne

(England) Newcastle Red Bulls
- Full name: Newcastle Red Bulls
- Union: Northumberland RFU
- Founded: 1877; 149 years ago
- Location: Newcastle upon Tyne, Tyne and Wear, England
- Ground: Kingston Park (Capacity: 10,200)
- CEO: Jonny Petrie
- Director of Rugby: Dan McFarland
- Coach: Stephen Jones
- Captain: George McGuigan
- Most appearances: Micky Ward (297)
- Top scorer: Jonny Wilkinson (1,489)
- Most tries: Tom May (47)
- League: PREM Rugby
- 2025–26: 10th of 10
1st kit	2nd kit

Largest win
- Newcastle Falcons 156–5 Rugby Lions (1996)

Largest defeat
- Leicester Tigers 83–10 Newcastle Falcons (2004)

Official website
- newcastleredbulls.co.uk

Newcastle Red Bulls, formerly known as Newcastle Falcons, is a rugby union team that play in Premiership Rugby, England's highest division of rugby union.

The club was established in 1877 as the "Gosforth Football Club". Around 1882 the club merged with the "Northumberland Football Club" and briefly assumed their name until 1887. In 1990, the name was changed to "Newcastle Gosforth" and the club began to play at Kingston Park stadium in Kingston Park, Newcastle upon Tyne. In 1996, following the start of professionalism the club briefly adopted the name "Newcastle Rugby Club" before becoming "Newcastle Falcons". The club was renamed to the Newcastle Red Bulls following a takeover by Red Bull GmbH in 2025.

Newcastle have won five major titles. They won the Premiership in 1998 and four domestic cups in 1976, 1977, 2001 and 2004.

Newcastle was the only English club of Jonny Wilkinson, where he played from 1997 to 2009, and as well as Wilkinson in 2003 Newcastle saw three players in the 2007 Rugby World Cup Final with Mathew Tait starting and Toby Flood appearing from the bench. Mark Wilson played in the 2019 Rugby World Cup Final while at the club.

== History ==
=== Name changes ===
- Gosforth Football Club (1877–1882)
- Northumberland Football Club (1882–1887); Merged with Northumberland FC and assumed their name.
- Gosforth Football Club (1887–1990); Reverted name back to Gosforth FC.
- Newcastle Gosforth (1990–1995)
- Newcastle Rugby Club (1996); Turned professional; Junior players let go and formed Gosforth Rugby Football Club.
- Newcastle Falcons (1997–2025)
- Newcastle Red Bulls (2025–Present): Renamed after takeover by Austrian energy drink brand Red Bull

=== Early years (1877–1990s) ===
The original Gosforth Football Club was founded in 1877 by a group of Old Boys of Durham School, in whose colours of green and white hoops the club played until the mid-1990s. The name Gosforth came from one of the suburbs of Newcastle upon Tyne.

Early grounds included the Gosforth Greyhound Stadium, which they played at until 1955, when the club moved at North Road. A much more compact ground suitable for rugby union, North Road had capacity of around 2,000, which included 400 in the stand, and would remain home until 1990. During that time and particularly in the late 1970s Gosforth enjoyed tremendous success both on and off the field winning the John Player Cup in seasons 1975–76 and 1976–77.

Gosforth supplied innumerable players to all counties over the years, to the North of England sides and to the full international and British Lions teams. These include Arthur Smith, Ray McLoughlin, Malcolm Young, Roger Uttley, Peter Dixon, Duncan Madsen, Dave Robinson, Richard Breakey, Jim Pollock and Colin White.

In 1990 the club name was changed to Newcastle Gosforth and they moved to Kingston Park. Gosforth Rugby Football Club continued as an amateur side working in partnership with Northumbria University and currently play at Broadway West.

=== Professional era ===
For the 1996–97 season the new name of Newcastle Falcons and new black-and-white colours were adopted, after local businessman Sir John Hall took control and attempted to create a sporting club in Newcastle that would emulate the success of the Barcelona model. The four teams that made up that sporting club were the football team, nicknamed the Magpies, the Newcastle Eagles basketball team, the Newcastle Cobras (later Riverkings, Jesters, Vipers) ice hockey team and the Newcastle Falcons rugby union team.

Newcastle was the first fully "professional" rugby union club in the world. In 1995, Hall installed former Wasps captain Rob Andrew as his salaried Director of Rugby and saw the club earn promotion from the national Second Division to the Premiership.

The following season, Newcastle became English Premiership champions at their first attempt in 1997–98. Alongside Andrew, the Championship winning side starred cross-code All Black, Samoa and Rugby League legend Inga Tuigamala, Scotland legends Doddie Weir and Gary Armstrong, England star Tony Underwood, British and Irish Lions stars Alan Tait and John Bentley and youngster Jonny Wilkinson.

During the following 1998–99 season Newcastle didn't play in Europe, as English teams did not take part, but the Falcons did go on to the Tetley's Bitter Cup final against Wasps, which was lost 29–19. In 1999, Rob Andrew retired allowing for 20-year-old international Jonny Wilkinson to assume the fly half role full-time. Andrew remained as Director of Rugby.

Hall sold the Falcons for a 'nominal' sum in 1999 to local businessman Dave Thompson, under whom the Falcons won two Powergen Cups: in 2001 the Falcons beat Harlequins FC 30–27; and in 2004 the Falcons beat 37–33 against Sale Sharks.

In 2004, legendary Wallabies full-back Matt Burke signed for the Falcons. For the Falcons, Burke played alongside former English rival Jonny Wilkinson (his opposite kicker in the 2001 British and Irish Lions tour of Australia). In Wilkinson, Burke, England international Dave Walder and emerging future England number 10 Toby Flood the Falcons had adequate competition for kicking duties over the coming seasons, despite long-term injuries to Jonny Wilkinson. During the 2004–05 season the Falcons recorded their best ever Heineken Cup performance to date by winning their pool and progressing to a quarter-final tie against Stade Français Paris in the Parc des Princes.

In August 2005 Falcons toured Japan pre-season. They beat NEC Green Rockets easily but lost to a fired-up Toyota Verblitz.

In August 2006 Rob Andrew left the Falcons to take charge of the England set-up ahead of the 2007 World Cup in a wide-ranging role that encompasses all aspects of the professional representative game in England. John Fletcher succeeded Rob Andrew as director of rugby at Newcastle Falcons with immediate effect. Fletcher, a former England A centre, had been the club's academy boss and he headed up a team of Peter Walton, Steve Black and Bob Morton, with ex-Falcons prop Ian Peel taking over as acting academy manager.

=== 2007–08 season ===
The season began with high hopes as New Zealand prop Carl Hayman signed for the Falcons, reportedly as the highest paid rugby union player in the world. Unfortunately, the season was the beginning of a downward spiral for the Falcons. On 11 March 2008, Fletcher and Walton left the club, officially by mutual consent, following Black, who had left a couple of months earlier. Steve Bates took over as interim director of rugby until summer 2008 when the post was reviewed. Dave Thompson stated at that time that nine years of underachievement were the reason for the departure of John Fletcher and Peter Walton.

Having said this, Bates guided the Falcons to a record-equalling run of seven consecutive Premiership defeats by April 2008 with home games against Leicester Tigers and London Wasps plus a season-concluding away trip to Worcester Warriors yet to come. Defeat in the European Challenge Cup semi-final against Worcester Warriors on 25 April 2008 may well have sounded the death knell for Steve Bates' tenure as interim DoR. However, on Tuesday 20 May 2008 Steve Bates was confirmed as Newcastle's Director of Rugby on a full-time basis. At the end of the season, fly-half Toby Flood left for Leicester Tigers and full-back Mathew Tait signed for Sale Sharks, as the struggling Falcons failed to hold onto young English international talent. England Saxons scrum-half Lee Dickson would also depart for Northampton Saints, where he would go on to earn full international honours. Legendary Australia full back Matt Burke retired due to injury at the end of the campaign.

=== 2008–09 season ===
In November 2008 Chairman Dave Thompson put an end to speculation of a takeover of the club after rejecting three bids. He held talks with a number of different consortia and reportedly turned down one offer of a full take over as the bidding consortium wanted to relocate the club to Darlington. Furthermore, he said the speculation had led to instability in the club which was unsettling players and fans alike. On the pitch the Falcons reached another European Challenge Cup quarter-final going down to Saracens away from home and finished 10th in the Premiership. This season marked the end of an era as legendary fly-half Jonny Wilkinson left the club for RC Toulonnais. England under-20s fly-half Rory Clegg also left for Harlequins as Jimmy Gopperth was signed as replacement fly-half. The loss of Wilkinson was compounded by the departure of future British and Irish Lions star Geoff Parling who continued the outflow of talent, leaving for Leicester Tigers. Another trio who would go on to achieve England honours in Phil Dowson, Dave Wilson and Tom May also left for Northampton Saints, Bath Rugby and RC Toulonnais respectively.

=== 2009–10 season ===
The Falcons failed to replace the character and quality which had departed Gopperth the sole bright spot. After a disappointing season the pressure mounted on Steve Bates and on 4 May 2010, the club announced that Bates' contract had been terminated and he was being replaced by first team coach Alan Tait. The decision came after Newcastle went on an unbeaten run to quash any doubts of relegation largely due to an inspirational Carl Hayman. But a crushing home European Challenge Cup Quarter Final defeat by Cardiff Blues signalled the end of the Bates era. Following the loss of England talent Flood, Tait and Wilkinson in previous seasons, the last remaining England international at the club, Jamie Noon, departed for CA Brive. The front line was also notably weakened when club captain Hayman left the Falcons once his lucrative contract expired, to join former teammate Wilkinson at RC Toulonnais.

=== 2010–11 season ===
Towards the end of the previous season Chairman Dave Thompson had to seek investment for the club due to increasing debts following the Nationalisation of Northern Rock, the club's main sponsor. After months of speculation, it was announced that local businessman Semore Kurdi had purchased a 40% stake in the club in September 2010, easing the club's financial difficulties. Scotland number 8 Ally Hogg was signed, while Scotland and Lions prop Euan Murray also arrived to plug the gap left by Hayman. On the pitch in Alan Tait's first season the Falcons reached the Anglo-Welsh Cup final, losing to Gloucester 34–7. Despite this relative success the Falcons finished their worst ever Premiership season with just 23 points (four wins), only escaping relegation thanks to the inferior points difference of Leeds Carnegie. England Saxons pair, scrum-half Micky Young and prop Kieran Brookes, would both depart for Leicester Tigers at the end of the campaign.

=== 2011–12 season: Relegation to Championship ===
The huge outflow of talent from 2008 onwards, and lack of suitable reinforcements, would come to bear during this campaign. Samoa international centre Jamie Helleur was a rare quality signing. The 2011–12 season saw Newcastle Falcons relegated from the Premiership. The Falcons started the season badly but rallied midway through as Gary Gold took over. After changing the set up at Kingston Park, the club nearly escaped relegation, but London Wasps held on to secure their Premiership status by a point. Despite finishing with a higher points total than the year before (32) it was not enough to keep them up. The Falcons still had a small hope that London Welsh may be refused Premiership status, however Welsh were promoted after an appeal. Many players, including Euan Murray, subsequently left the club.

=== 2012–13 season: Repromotion to Premiership ===
The Falcons' season in the Championship sees the much changed side coached by director of rugby Dean Richards who appointed Will Welch as club captain, while experienced international locks Scott MacLeod and Carlo Del Fava were signed. The Falcons won their first game of the season 37–20 against Bristol and went on to win their second 49–32 against London Scottish. At the halfway point of the season the Falcons were maintaining their unbeaten run, including a 24–13 score against a touring Tongan national side during the first international game to be held at Kingston Park since 1990. Former England Saxons wing Noah Cato signed from Northampton Saints to assist in the promotion push.

The Falcons confirmed their place in the Championship play off semi-final with a bonus point win at home to Cornish Pirates on 22 February 2013 and their position as league leaders was confirmed early the following month. At the conclusion of the season, the Falcons defeated the Bedford Blues 49–33 on aggregate in the final to win promotion back to the Premiership for the 2013–14 season.

=== 2013–14 season ===
Prior to the beginning of the Falcons' return to the Aviva Premiership, star fly-half Jimmy Gopperth departed for Leinster Rugby. To replace Gopperth, former Falcon Rory Clegg was signed by Dean Richards for the second time, with Richards having previously signed Clegg for Harlequins when Clegg was just 19. Four years later, the return of Clegg, alongside the returning Kieran Brookes from Leicester Tigers, provided evidence that talent was coming back to the Falcons. The signings of former Scotland and Lions scrum-half Mike Blair from CA Brive, Saracens flanker Andy Saull, Scotland hooker Scott Lawson from London Irish, former Scotland fly half Phil Godman and one time France prop Franck Montanella showed the desire of the club to compete upon return to the top flight. Samoa wing Sinoti Sinoti and Argentina centre Gonzalo Tiesi were later added to the squad. Despite a difficult season, which saw a number of retirements through injury, including Carlo Del Fava, the Falcons secured their place in the Aviva Premiership for 2014–15.

=== 2014–15 season ===
The Falcons made a statement ahead of the 2014–15 season with the signing of 2010–11 Premiership top try scorer and three time Premiership winner Alesana Tuilagi. One of Alesana's six rugby playing brothers, Andy Tuilagi also signed for the Falcons. Another notable signing was Italy lock Joshua Furno, while Samoa lock Kane Thompson was another new addition. Rotherham Titans duo, Juan Pablo Socino and Ruki Tipuna also joined the club. The Falcons finished the season in 11th place, with a points total of 34.

=== 2015–16 season ===
Ahead of the 2015–16 campaign, England international prop Kieran Brookes and England under-20 lock Dominic Barrow departed for Northampton Saints and Leicester Tigers respectively. Fly halves Rory Clegg and Phil Godman, wing Noah Cato, flanker Andy Saull, scrum halves Mike Blair and Warren Fury along with centre Jamie Helleur were among those released.

A host of 2015 Rugby World Cup stars were signed in Tonga flanker and captain Nili Latu, Tonga scrum half Sonatane Takulua, Italy wing Giovanbattista Venditti and Scotland prop Jon Welsh. The return of former star scrum half Micky Young was also a coup for the Falcons, alongside one time All Black cap, fly half Mike Delany and former England lock Mouritz Botha.

=== 2016–17 season ===
Following seven years in Bath, England prop Dave Wilson returned to the Falcons. France international centre Maxime Mermoz also joined mid-season. Winger Vereniki Goneva had most metres in the Premiership with 1,615 while Mark Wilson received his first England caps.

=== 2017–18 season: The Big One, Doddie Weir and a New Era ===
Ahead of the 2017–18 campaign, former England fly-half Toby Flood returned after nine years in Leicester and Toulouse.

On 17 January 2018, the Falcons were presented with a winding up petition by HMRC.

Falcons ended the 2017–18 season in fourth place in the Premiership Rugby table, their highest placing in 20 years. Falcons played Exeter Chiefs at Sandy Park in the semi-finals, where they lost 36–5.. Rob Vickers, Scott Lawson and Ally Hogg all retired following the end of the season after upholding exceptional careers over a decade. Scott Wilson, aged 24 at the time, was forced to retire due to a neck injury he sustained in the semi-final against Exeter. A benefit dinner was held in early 2019 to raise funds for Wilson's chosen charity.

=== 2018–19 season: Second Relegation ===
Newcastle keen to follow on from the success of last season expanded their squad with key players such as Logovi'i Mulipola, John Hardie, Nemani Nagusa and George McGuigan.

Falcons returned to the Heineken Champions Cup after a 13-year absence. They were drawn to play against Toulon, Montpellier and Edinburgh in Pool 5. On 14 October, Falcons started their European Campaign against Toulon at Stade Felix Mayol. Less than 30 seconds into the game and Toulon were already on the board after Romain Taofifénua charged down the kick off and scored a try, one of the quickest tries scored in the history of the competition. In the fourth quarter of the game, three of Toulon's players were sin-binned and they were forced to make a decision after being awarded a penalty within kicking distance. However, instead of going for the posts they elected for a five-metre line-out which failed to result in a try. The final score came to 25–26 as Falcons become the second team in a European competition to beat Toulon at home, an accolade that only Saracens had achieved before.

Mark Wilson was announced in Eddie Jones' Autumn Internationals Squad following players being injured at the time. He started against England's 12–11 win over South Africa and won Quilter Internationals player of the series. He became a regular starter for England in the 2019 Six Nations along with Gary Graham making his debut for Scotland.

Following the success of the previous "The Big One", Falcons announced on 4 December that their match against northern rivals Sale Sharks would be played at Newcastle United's St. James' Park. The match would be held as a Charity Event in aid of Doddie Weir and the My Name’5 Doddie foundation. ISC incorporated the ‘Doddie’5 Tartan’ into the shoulders of the Charity Jersey along with the Famous Black and White stripes representing the iconic colours worn by Newcastle United. The match was a success with 27,284 spectators present as Newcastle beat Sale 22–17.

Falcons confirmed the signing of United States international Greg Peterson in mid-March with Darren Barry, Josh Basham, Gareth Owen and Toby Salmon following shortly after. Tongan international Cooper Vuna later signed a 2-year deal with the club. They also announced a 5-year deal with sportswear brand Macron to provide official kits and leisurewear as their official supplier.

On 4 May, it was confirmed that Newcastle Falcons would be relegated to the RFU Championship after failing to beat Gloucester away. After this, many prominent players elected to leave the club to further pursue top-flight rugby. Following the confirmation of relegation into the Championship, Simon Hammersley and Chris Harris both evoked relegation release clauses held within their contracts and signed for Sale Sharks and Gloucester Rugby respectively. Wasps picked up Zach Kibirige with Director of Rugby Dai Young saying Kibirige was "simply too good an opportunity to miss". England International Mark Wilson signed a one-year loan agreement with Sale Sharks which would ultimately allow him to still play for his country despite being registered to a Championship team. Finally on 3 July, it was announced that fan favourite Vereniki Goneva had signed for Harlequins following rumours and speculation on where he would go following Falcons' demotion. He signed along with fellow Fijian international Tevita Cavubati and Newcastle teammate Glen Young.

=== 2019–20 season: Greene King Championship and the COVID-19 Pandemic ===
Keen to start the new season in the right direction, Falcons bolstered their Premiership side against every team they faced in the competition winning every match both home and away, their largest win being 41–0 against Bedford Blues on 14 March 2020. Due to the COVID-19 pandemic in the United Kingdom, the RFU officially cancelled the season on 20 March 2020, after initially postponing all rugby in England. As a result, Newcastle Falcons were declared champions for the season and promoted back into the Premiership on the basis of their playing record having been undefeated and at the top of the table when the league was suspended. The club made a series of salary reductions for players and off-field staff to ensure the survival of the company during an unprecedented time, this included all branches of the club including Newcastle Thunder and the team's charity branch, Newcastle Falcons Foundation.

It was also at this time that Johnny Williams announced he would be moving to Scarlets at the official conclusion of the season with Dominic Waldouck joining Gloucester Rugby as their Defence Coach. Nick Easter also joined Falcons' coaching squad shortly after.

=== 2020–21 season: Post-Pandemic revival ===
After a wait of 8 months, Rugby Union restarted across England with teams cautiously returning to some level of normality. Newcastle, back in the Premiership, expanded and strengthened its squad with the flagship signing of Luther Burrell following a cross-code switch from Warrington Wolves. Home grown talent Gary Graham and Jamie Blamire both signed 3-year contract extensions respectively. Sinoti Sinoti, a fan favourite at the club who was a key asset in the Falcons' previous seasons left the club owing to "Personal Reasons".

=== 2021–22 season: RFU Investigation into Institutionalised Racism ===
On 25 June 2022 the Daily Mail interviewed player Luther Burrell highlighting racism in his rugby playing career, specifically mentioning how it had become commonplace in the Newcastle Falcons team. Burrell had been the target of racist remarks between teammates who brushed it off as wikt:"locker room talk". The club launched an internal investigation following the story breaking with Luther receiving public support for his actions with many fans of the club and the Rugby Union community condemning the claims stated in the article. The Rugby Football Union announced on 24 July that they would conduct a full independent investigation into the allegations made by Burrell.

Newcastle finished the 2021-22 Premiership Rugby season in 12th place, entitling them to play in the 2022-23 European Rugby Challenge Cup.

=== 2022–23 season ===
Newcastle Falcons finished bottom of the table in the 2022-23 season, 10 points behind Gloucester.

=== 2023–24 season ===
Newcastle Falcons finished bottom of the table in the 2023-24 season, without winning a single match.

=== 2024–25 season ===
On 18 October 2024, Newcastle Falcons ended their 25-match losing streak in the 2024–25 Premiership Rugby season with a victory over Exeter Chiefs, with this being their first league victory since March 2023. On 29 November 2024, they would climb off the bottom of the table beating Saracens 17–12 at home. This was their first win over them since 2009. Having endured a run of many consecutive loses, by this point they had won five of their last six games in all competitions.

On 18 March 2025, Newcastle Falcons announced a player recruitment freeze until further funding is secured.

On 11 April 2025, Steve Diamond, the director of rugby at Newcastle Falcons, was handed a six-game ban after being found to have verbally abused match officials.

Newcastle Falcons finished bottom of the table for the third season in a row.

=== 2025–26: Red Bull takeover ===
The Falcons branding was used from 1996 until 2025

In August 2025, it was announced that the club had been purchased by Red Bull GmbH and that they would be renamed Newcastle Red Bulls. The takeover came after previous owner Semore Kurdi, who had been majority shareholder since 2011, put the club up for sale at the end of 2024. As part of the deal, Red Bull agreed to take over the £39million of debt the club owed, including £14.5million in unpaid treasury loans taken out during the COVID-19 pandemic. They also announced Kingston Park would remain their home ground while Steve Diamond would remain as Director of Rugby.

On 1 October 2025, Steve Diamond was sacked after just one game into the new season. He was effectively replaced by Alan Dickens.

On 16 March 2026, Stephen Jones replaced Alan Dickens as head coach.

== Club information ==
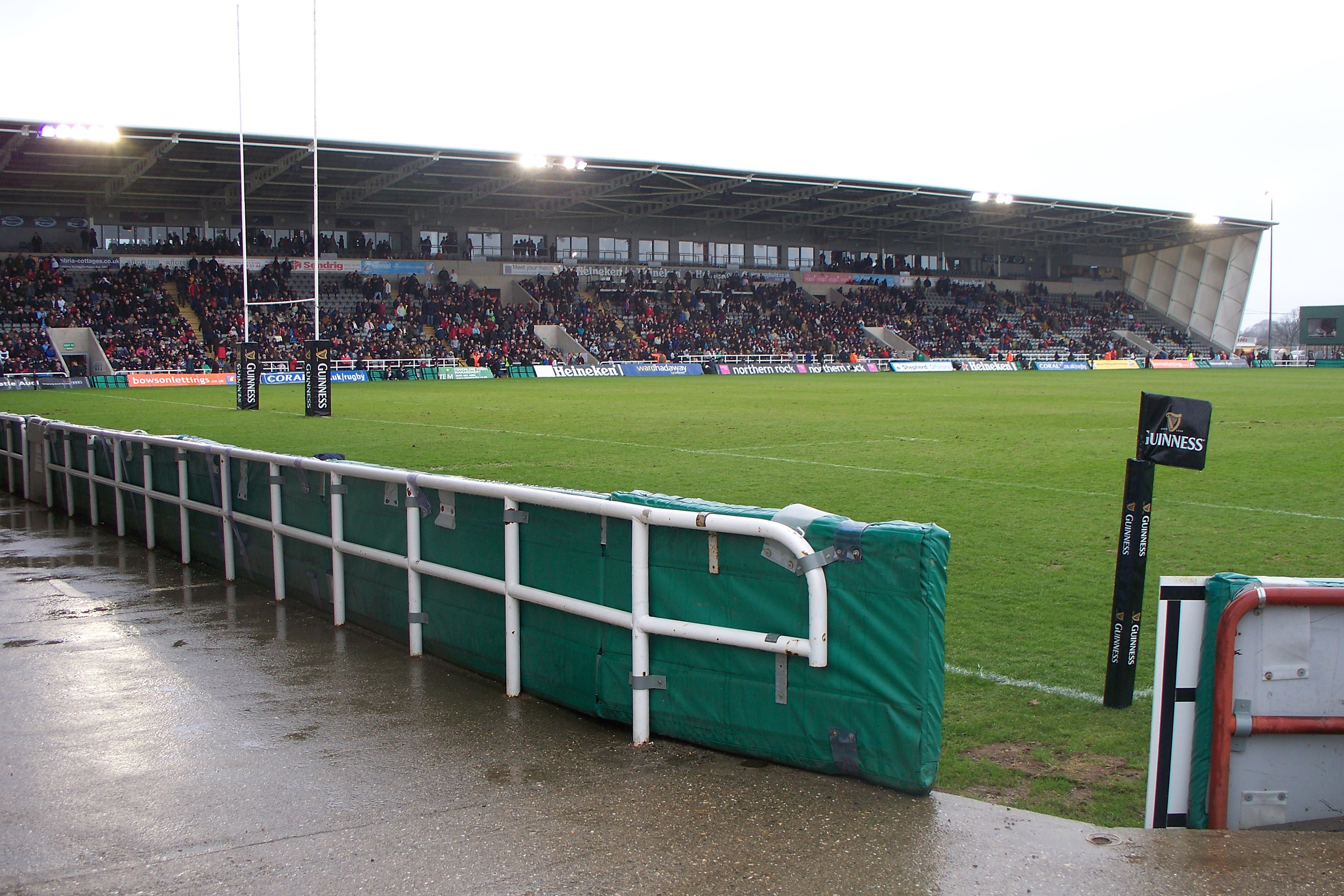
Kingston Park

=== Stadium ===
Newcastle Red Bulls play at Kingston Park which holds 10,250. Kingston Park was the second smallest stadium in the Premiership Rugby with the club's average attendance currently sitting at approximately 10,000, a 42.5% increase from the 2016–17 season and a 96.8% increase from the 2013–14 season. The stadium has three modern stands; the open air North standing Terrace, the enclosed South Stand Terrace – where the loudest fans traditionally stand and sing, and the all-seated West Stand. However, the Falcons also retain the original Gosforth East stand complete with green and white seating (Gosforth colours). The pitch at Kingston Park recently went under renovation, replacing the former grass surface with a 3G Synthetic pitch with the aim of reducing the matches lost to the North East weather. In June 2015, the Falcons bought Kingston Park back from Northumbria University, which was a bold statement by the club ahead of the 2015–16 season.

On 16 September 2017 the Falcons played a home game away from Kingston Park and become the second English team to host a game in the United States when they faced Saracens at the Talen Energy Stadium in Philadelphia.

On 24 March 2018 Newcastle Falcons hosted "The Big One", their Premiership fixture against Northampton Saints. It was originally booked to be played at Kingston Park but after an agreement came together with Newcastle United F.C., it was moved to St James' Park, Newcastle United's home ground. The goal was to promote rugby union in North East England while also being the Falcons' biggest home crowd to date. The bar was set at 20,000 attendees which would beat their previous record of 11,595 set in 1999 when a match was held at Gateshead International Stadium. For the match, Falcons wore a unique black and white striped shirt similar to that worn by Newcastle United. It was announced after "The Big One" game that 30,174 people attended the game as Falcons beat Northampton Saints 25–22. It was the first Premiership Rugby match to be played at St James' Park, and the success of the initiative led to Newcastle Falcons doing the same in the 2018–2019 season.

=== Kits ===
Gosforth

During the years known as Gosforth, the club played in green and white hoops, colours that are still retained by the existing Gosforth Rugby Club.

Season	Kit manufacturer
1997–2001	Adidas
2001–2003	Gilbert
2003–2007	Kooga
2007–2008	Nike
2008–2012	Cotton Traders
2012–2014	Orion
2014–2017	Gilbert
2017–2020	ISC
2020–2024	Macron
2024–	VX3

== Season summaries ==
	League				Domestic Cup		European Cup	
Season	Competition	Final position	Points	Play-offs	Competition	Performance	Competition	Performance
1987–88	Courage League Division 2	10th	17	N/A	John Player Cup	4th round	No competition	N/A
1988–89	Courage League Division 2	10th	8	N/A	Pilkington Cup	3rd round	No competition	N/A
1989–90	Courage League Division 2	12th	3	N/A	Pilkington Cup	4th round	No competition	N/A
1990–91	Courage League Division 2	6th	12	N/A	Pilkington Cup	4th round	No competition	N/A
1991–92	Courage League Division 2	4th	14	N/A	Pilkington Cup	Quarter-final	No competition	N/A
1992–93	Courage League Division 2	1st (P)	20	N/A	Pilkington Cup	4th round	No competition	N/A
1993–94	Courage League Division 1	10th (R)	5	N/A	Pilkington Cup	5th round	No competition	N/A
1994–95	Courage League Division 2	3rd	18	N/A	Pilkington Cup	4th round	No competition	N/A
1995–96	Courage League Division 2	8th	11	N/A	Pilkington Cup	5th round	No English teams	N/A
1996–97	Courage League Division 2	2nd (P)	39	N/A	Pilkington Cup	Quarter-final	Not qualified	N/A
1997–98	Premiership	1st	38	N/A	Tetley's Bitter Cup	Quarter-final	Challenge Cup	Semi-final
1997–98	Premiership	1st	38	N/A	C&G Cup	Unknown	Challenge Cup	Semi-final
1998–99	Premiership	8th	28	N/A	Tetley's Bitter Cup	Runners-up	No English teams	N/A
1998–99	Premiership	8th	28	N/A	C&G Cup	Semi-final	No English teams	N/A
1999–00	Premiership	9th	20	N/A	Tetley's Bitter Cup	5th round	Challenge Cup	Quarter-final
2000–01	Premiership	6th	57	N/A	Tetley's Bitter Cup	Champions	Challenge Cup	Semi-final
2001–02	Premiership	6th	56	N/A	Powergen Cup	Semi-final	Heineken Cup	4th in pool
2002–03	Premiership	10th	40	–	Powergen Cup	6th round	Challenge Cup	Quarter-final
2003–04	Premiership	9th	45	–	Powergen Cup	Champions	Challenge Cup	2nd round
2004–05	Premiership	7th	47	–	Powergen Cup	6th round	Heineken Cup	Quarter-final
2005–06	Premiership	7th	47	–	Powergen Cup	2nd in pool	Challenge Cup	Semi-final
2006–07	Premiership	9th	44	–	EDF Energy Cup	2nd in pool	Challenge Cup	Quarter-final
2007–08	Premiership	11th	34	–	EDF Energy Cup	3rd in pool	Challenge Cup	Semi-final
2008–09	Premiership	10th	44	–	EDF Energy Cup	4th in pool	Challenge Cup	Quarter-final
2009–10	Premiership	9th	37	–	LV= Cup	4th in pool	Challenge Cup	Quarter-final
2010–11	Premiership	11th	23	–	LV= Cup	Runners-up	Challenge Cup	4th in pool
2011–12	Premiership	12th (R)	32	–	LV= Cup	4th in pool	Challenge Cup	2nd in pool
2012–13	RFU Championship	1st (P)	98	Champions	British and Irish Cup	Runners-up	Not qualified	N/A
2013–14	Premiership	11th	22	–	LV= Cup	2nd in pool	Challenge Cup	2nd in pool
2014–15	Premiership	11th	34	–	LV= Cup	2nd in pool	Challenge Cup	Quarter-final
2015–16	Premiership	11th	27	–	No competition	N/A	Challenge Cup	2nd in pool
2016–17	Premiership	8th	49	–	Anglo-Welsh Cup	3rd in pool	Challenge Cup	3rd in pool
2017–18	Premiership	4th	63	Semi-final	Anglo-Welsh Cup	Semi-final	Challenge Cup	Semi-final
2018–19	Premiership	12th (R)	31	–	Premiership Cup	Semi-final	Champions Cup	4th in pool
2019–20	Championship	1st (P)	104.5 (adj)	–	RFU Championship Cup	Competition unfinished	Not qualified	N/A
2020–21	Premiership	10th	45	–	No competition	N/A	Challenge Cup	Quarter-final
2021–22	Premiership	12th	34	–	Premiership Cup	2nd in pool	Challenge Cup	2nd in pool
2022–23	Premiership	11th	31	–	Premiership Cup	3rd in pool	Challenge Cup	7th in pool
2023–24	Premiership	10th	5	–	Premiership Cup	2nd in pool	Challenge Cup	5th in pool
2024–25	Premiership	10th	13	–	Premiership Cup	Semi-final	Challenge Cup	6th in pool

Gold background denotes champions
Silver background denotes runners-up
Pink background denotes relegated

== Club honours ==
=== National ===
- Premiership Rugby
  - Champions: (1) 1997–98
- Championship (2nd division)
  - Champions: (3) 1992–93, 2012–13, 2019–20
  - Runners–Up: (1) 1996–97
- RFU Knockout Cup
  - Champions: (4) 1975–76, 1976–77, 2000–01, 2003–04
  - Runners–Up: (2) 1998–99, 2010–11
- British and Irish Cup
  - Runners–Up: (1) 2012–13

=== Local ===
- Northumberland Senior Cup
  - Champions: (30) 1927–28, 1955–56, 1959–60, 1961–62, 1962–63, 1963–64, 1965–66, 1966–67, 1967–68, 1968–69, 1970–71, 1971–72, 1972–73, 1973–74, 1974–75, 1975–76, 1976–77, 1977–78, 1978–79, 1979–80, 1980–81, 1981–82, 1982–83, 1984–85, 1985–86, 1986–87, 1989–90, 1990–91, 1992–93, 1993–94

=== Sevens ===
- Melrose Sevens
  - Champions: (1) 2006
- Hawick Sevens
  - Champions: (3) 2005, 2006, 2007
- Langholm Sevens
  - Champions: (4) 2005, 2006, 2007, 2008
- Selkirk Sevens
  - Champions: (1) 2004
- Peebles Sevens
  - Champions: (1) 2004
- Middlesex Sevens
  - Champions: (1) 2007

== Current squad ==
The Newcastle Red Bulls squad ahead of the 2026–27 season is:

Newcastle Red Bulls 2025–26 Premiership Rugby squad
**Props**: (England) Adam Brocklebank; (England) James Harper; (Scotland) **Murray McCallum**; (Scotland) **Elliot Millar Mills**; (South Africa) Richard Palframan; (New Zealand) Pouri Rakete-Stones; (Argentina) **Francisco Moreno**; (England) Tom West; **Hookers**: (England) Samson Adejimi; (England) Ollie Fletcher; (England) George McGuigan **(c)**; (Fiji) **Zuriel Togiatama**; (Scotland) **George Turner**; **Locks**: (Canada) **Mason Flesch**; (England) Cameron Jordan; (Argentina) **Franco Molina**; (Scotland) Adam Scott; (England) Rus Tuima	**Back row**: (New Zealand) Tom Christie; (Scotland) Allan Ferrie; (England) Sam Graham; (England) Max Hicks; (England) Ollie Leatherbarrow; (New Zealand) **Hoskins Sotutu**; **Scrum-halves**: (Argentina) **Simón Benítez Cruz**; (England) James Elliott; (England) **Raffi Quirke**; **Fly-halves**: (Ireland) Brett Connon; (England) Zack Henry	**Centres**: (Ireland) **Sammy Arnold**; (England) Ethan Grayson; (Scotland) **Chris Harris**; (Scotland) Cammy Hutchison; (England) Will Rigg; (England) Oli Spencer; **Wings**: (England) Obi Ene; (England) Alex Hearle; (England) Brandon Jackson; (South Africa) Werner Kok; (England) **Christian Wade**; **Fullbacks**: (Argentina) **Benjamín Elizalde**; (England) Josh Hodge; (England) Harrison Obatoyinbo
**(c)** denotes the team captain. **Bold** denotes internationally capped players.^{ST} denotes a short-term signing. Source:

=== Academy squad ===
The Newcastle Red Bulls academy squad is:

Newcastle Red Bulls 2026–27 Senior Academy squad
**Props**: (England) Elvis Kitenge-Fuki; (England) Micky Rewcastle; (England) Nathan Rickerby; **Hookers**: (England) Will Graham; (Scotland) Jack Nesbitt; (England) Charlie Turner; **Locks**: (England) Finn Baker; (England) Oscar Usher	**Back row**: (England) George Bolam; (England) Euan Oakes; (England) Reuben Parsons; **Scrum-halves**: (England) Joe Davis; **Fly-halves**: (Scotland) Jake Dalziel	**Centres**: (England) Oliver Ashton; (England) Rhys Beeckmans; **Wings**: (England) Nathan Greenwood; (Scotland) Harry Hawkins; (England) Alfie Warwick; **Fullbacks**: (England) Charlie Dineen; (England) Sam Waugh
Italics denotes U20 international. Source:

== Club staff ==
From 1 July 2026, for the 2026–27 season, the management and coaching structure will be the following:

Role	Name
Head coach	Dan McFarland
Attack Coach	Stephen Jones
Defence Coach	Calum MacRae
Scrum Coach	Micky Ward
Skills and Transition Coach	Lee Dickson
Coaching Co-ordinator and Transition Coach	Mark Laycock
Head of Academy	James Ponton
Head of Analysis	Steve Bremner
Head of Athletic Performance	Kevin McShane
Head of Medical Services	Dermot Austin

== Notable former players ==
=== Lions Tourists ===
The following Newcastle players have been selected for the Lions tours while at the club:

- 2001 & 2005: Jonny Wilkinson
- 1997: Tim Stimpson, John Bentley, Tony Underwood, Alan Tait, Doddie Weir
- 1989 - Gary Armstrong
- 1974: Roger Uttley
- 1966: Ray McLoughlin

=== Rugby World Cup ===
The following are players which have represented their countries at the Rugby World Cup, whilst playing for Newcastle:

Tournament	Players selected	England players	Other national team players
1999	8	Jonny Wilkinson	George Graham, Stuart Grimes, Doddie Weir, Peter Walton, Gary Armstrong (Scotland) , Va'aiga Tuigamala (Samoa) , Ross Nesdale (Ireland)
2003	2	Jonny Wilkinson	Stuart Grimes (Scotland)
2007	4	Jonny Wilkinson, Toby Flood, Jamie Noon, Mathew Tait	
2011	3		Suka Hufanga (Tonga) , Euan Murray (Scotland) , Taiasina Tuifu'a (Samoa)
2015	9		Alesana Tuilagi, Kane Thompson (Samoa) , Jon Welsh (Scotland) , Eric Fry (United States) , Juan Pablo Socino (Argentina) , Nili Latu, Sonatane Takulua (Tonga) , Joshua Furno, Giovanbattista Venditti (Italy)
2019	6	Mark Wilson	Logovi'i Mulipola (Samoa) , Sonatane Takulua, Cooper Vuna (Tonga) , Greg Peterson (United States) , Josh Matavesi (Fiji)
2023	4		Eduardo Bello, Pedro Rubiolo, Matías Moroni, Mateo Carreras (Argentina)

== Records ==
=== Team records ===
- Record win: 156–5 vs Rugby Lions (Courage League 1996)
- Record loss: 10–83 vs Leicester Tigers (Zurich Premiership 2004–05)
- Best league position: 1st (Premiership, 1997–98)
- Worst league position: 12th (Division Two, 1989–90)

=== Player records ===
- Most Premiership appearances: Tom May – 193
- Top Premiership try scorer: Tom May – 47
- Top Premiership points scorer: Jonny Wilkinson – 1,489
