= Michael Griffin (surgeon) =

British upper gastro-intestinal surgeon

Michael Griffin OBE, MD, FRCSEd, FRCSEng
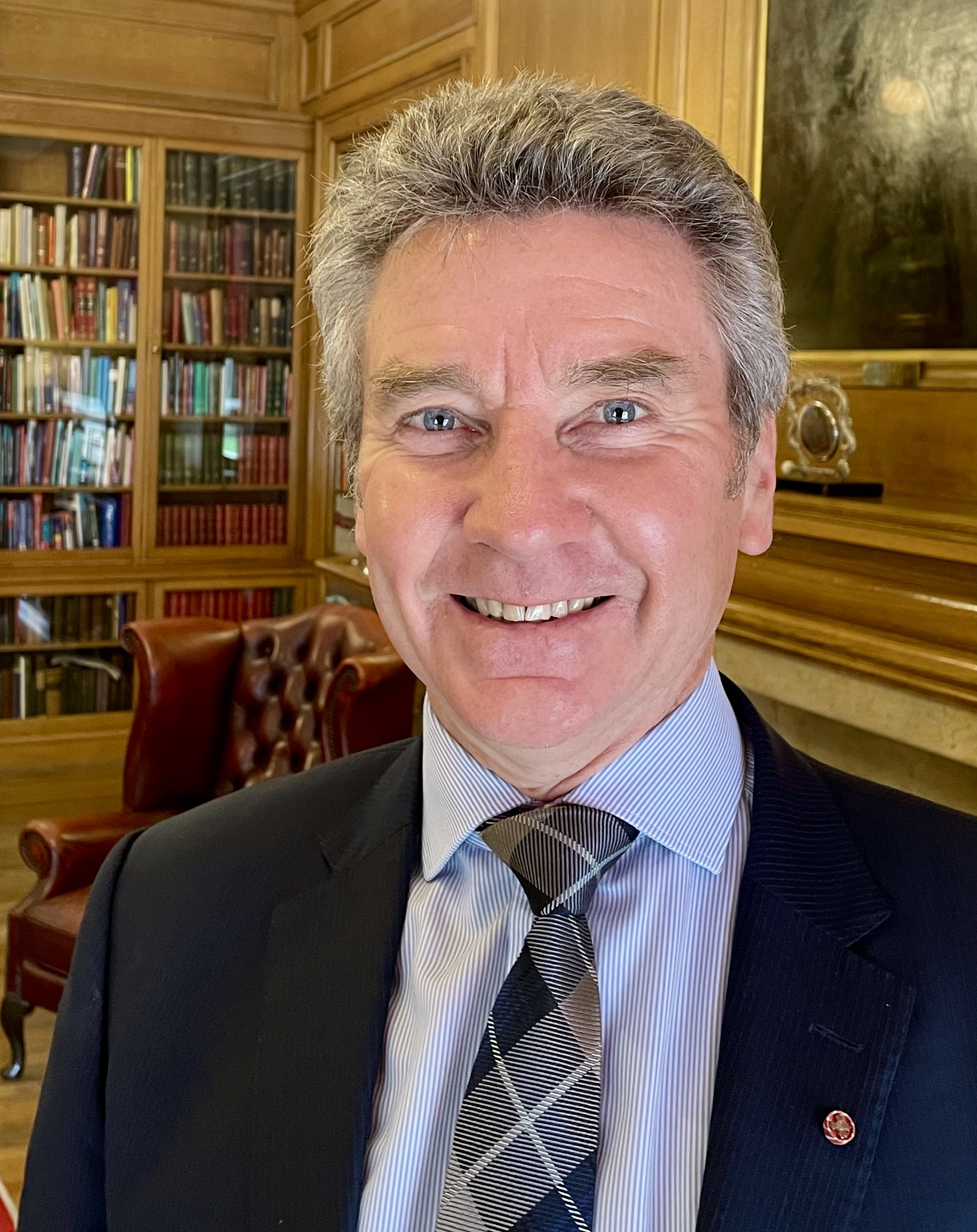
- Michael Griffin in 2024
- Born: Selwyn Michael Griffin; 7 February 1955 (age 71)
- Education: Fettes College, Edinburgh; Newcastle University
- Occupation: Professor of surgery emeritus
- Known for: Upper gastrointestinaal surgery; Presidency Royal College of Surgeons of Edinburgh
- Medical career
- Profession: Upper gastrointestinal surgery
- Institutions: Newcastle University
- Research: Gastric cancer; Oesopageal cancer

Selwyn Michael Griffin, OBE, MD, FRCSEd, FRCSEng, FRCPE (born 7 February 1955), usually known as Michael Griffin, is a British surgeon and clinical researcher known for his work in the early diagnosis and radical treatment of gastric and oesophageal cancer.

He was an upper gastrointestinal surgeon at the Royal Victoria Infirmary in Newcastle upon Tyne and was appointed professor of gastrointestinal surgery at the University of Newcastle Upon Tyne in 1999. His clinical and research interests included methods of improving earlier diagnosis and investigating methods of improving the treatment and outcomes for gastric cancer and oesophageal cancer. He played an important role in developing the Northern Oesophagogastric Cancer Unit in Newcastle into one of the largest such specialist units in Europe. Griffin was president of the Association of Upper GI Surgeons of Great Britain and Ireland (AUGIS) and president of the European Society of Diseases of the Esophagus (ESDE). He chaired the Joint Committee for Intercollegiate Examinations (JCIE), the body reposnsible for the administration of specialist surgical examinations in Great Britain and Ireland.

He was made an Officer of the Order of the British Empire (OBE) for services to cancer health care in 2013 and was elected President of the Royal College of Surgeons of Edinburgh in 2018.

== Early life and education ==
Griffin was educated at Fettes College, Edinburgh, and graduated MBBS in 1978 having studied medicine at Newcastle University School of Medicine. He played rugby for Scotland at junior levels and also played for Durham County and for Gosforth Rugby Club with whom he won the John Player Cup in 1976.

After becoming a Fellow of both the Royal College of Surgeons of England and of Edinburgh, he was awarded a Wellcome Surgical Training Scholarship in 1983. He received the postgraduate degree of Doctor of Medicine (MD) in 1989.

He completed his postgraduate surgical training in Newcastle, Carlisle and Hong Kong from 1979 to 1989.

== Career ==
He spent a fellowship in surgery at the Prince of Wales Hospital and at the Chinese University of Hong Kong, studying oesophageal cancer surgery and interventional endoscopy. In 1990 he was appointed consultant upper-gastrointestinal surgeon in Newcastle and was made professor of gastrointestinal surgery at the University of Newcastle upon Tyne in 1999.

He has been a visiting professor at a number of institutions including the Chinese University of Hong Kong, the University of Southern California, and he was the Penman Professor in the University of Capetown.

In Newcastle he developed new approaches to the treatment of oesophagogastric malignancies. The Northern Oesophagogastric Cancer Unit had been established in 1990 and he played an important part in its development. It became one of the largest specialist units by clinical load in Europe In 2005 Griffin featured in the BBC television series Your Life in their Hands in which he describes the care of patients with oesophageal and gastric cancer and demonstrates the surgical techniques used to treat them.

In 2011 he treated the political consultant Philip Gould, who described his experience as a patient in his memoir The Unfinished Life. Griffin, he wrote, 'exuded confidence and authority, his presence making me feel immediately safe...he was very tough, but his toughness was reassuring.' He went on ' he was driven: to save lives, to make his unit the best in the world, to do everything he possibly could for his patients.'

In 1995 Griffin set up the Oesophagoose charity which has raised funds for clinical research across the United Kingdom for improving care in the community for cancer patients. Each year the charity arranges for up to 1,000 patients return to meet the doctors and healthcare staff from the Northern Oesophago-Gastric Cancer Unit.

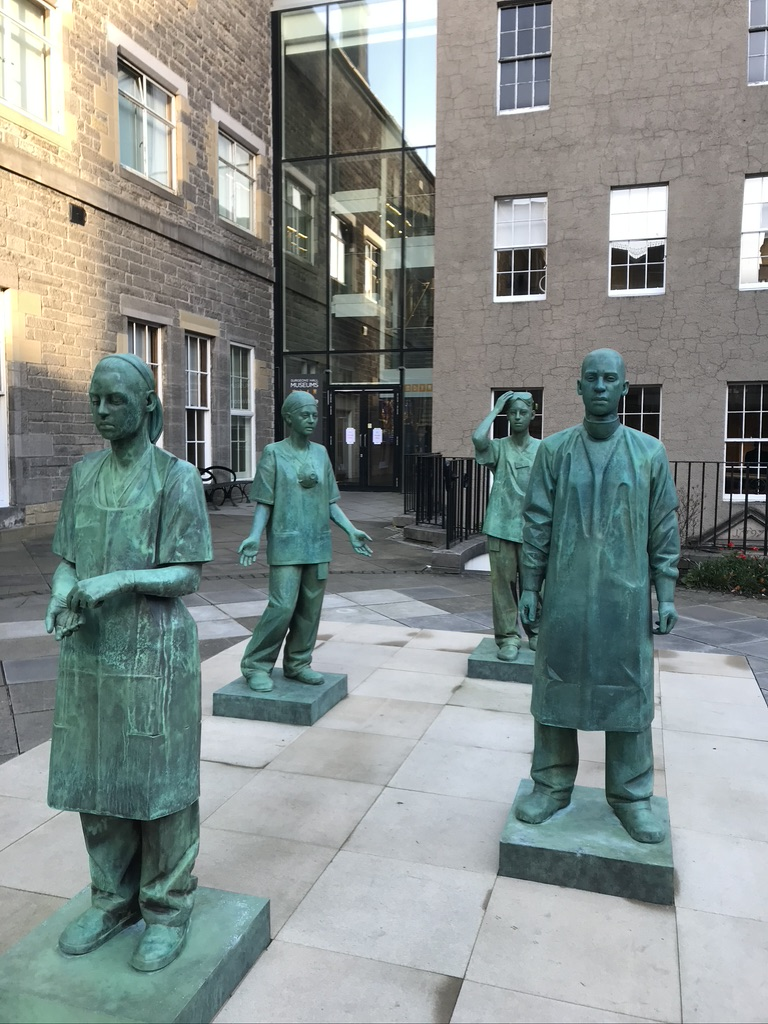
Four statues by Kenny Hunter created as a memorial to all healthcare staff who worked during the Covid-19 pandemic.

In 2018 he was elected President of the Royal College of Surgeons of Edinburgh. During his presidency he campaigned for the establishment of surgical and diagnostic hubs to reduce waiting times for surgery and to allow surgical procedures to continue separated from units dealing with Covid-19 patients. He arranged for a memorial to NHS staff to be created in the grounds of the College, commissioning the sculptor Kenny Hunter to create four life-sized figures of health care workers.

== Personal life ==
Griffin is the son of Selwyn Gerrard Griffin (1913–1992), who was a cardiac surgeon at Freeman Hospital, Newcastle upon Tyne.

== Awards and honours ==
Griffin has been made an honorary fellow by:

- The Royal College of Surgeons in Ireland
- The Royal Australasian College of Surgeons
- The American College of Surgeons
- The Royal College of Physicians and Surgeons of Glasgow
- The Royal College of Physicians of Edinburgh
- The College of Surgeons of Hong Kong
- The Association of Surgeons of India
- The College of Surgeons of Sri Lanka.

He has given eponymous lectures including the Bennett lecture at Trinity College, Dublin and the 90th Abraham Colles lecture at the RCSI in 2015.

He is a member of the James IV Association of Surgeons. Griffin was awarded a lifetime achievement award for services to cancer by the British Association of Surgical Oncology in 2019.

In 2013 he was made an Officer of the Order of the British Empire (OBE) for services to cancer health care in 2013.

== Selected publications ==
Griffin has published over 300 peer review publications. and edited 6 textbooks. In addition he has written over 40 chapters in textbooks. His research has been largely into aspects of treatment and outcomes of oesophageal and gastric mailgnancies.

=== Papers ===
- Phillips AW, Griffin SM Three decades of oesophagogastric cancer care: now a curable disease.Br J Surg. 2021 Jun 22;108(6):595-597. doi: 10.1093/bjs/znab091.
- Phillips A W, Lagarde S M, Navidi M, Disep B, Griffin S M. Impact of Extent of Lymphadenectomy on Survival, Post Neoadjuvant Chemotherapy and Thransthoracic Esophagectomy. Ann Surg. 2017 Apr;265(4):750-756. doi: 10.1097/SLA.0000000000001737
- Phillips A W, Dent B, Navidi M, Immanuel A, Griffin S M. Trainee Involvement in Ivor Lewis Esophagectomy Does Not Negatively Impact Outcomes. Ann Surg. 2018 Jan;267(1):94-98. Doi: 10.1097/SLA.0000000000002047.
- Griffin SM, Kamarajah SK, Navidi M, Wahed S, Immanuel A, Hayes N, Phillips AW.Evolution of gastrectomy for cancer over 30-years: Changes in presentation, management, and outcomes. Surgery. 2021 Jul;170(1):2-10. doi: 10.1016/j.surg.2021.01.040. Epub 2021 Mar 3..

=== Books ===
A Companion to Surgical Practice: Upper Gastrointestinal Surgery. Volume 2. 2nd edition W B Saunders.(2001) ISBN 0-7020-2587-9]. Co-edited with S A Raimes
