= Craig Willis (rugby union) =

English rugby union player

- Born: 4 February 1995 (age 31) Stockton-on-Tees, England
- Height: 180 cm (5 ft 11 in)
- Weight: 92 kg (203 lb)
- School: Durham School

Rugby union career
- Position: Fly-Half
- Current team: SU Agen
Senior career
Years	Team	Apps	(Points)
2013–2018	Newcastle Falcons	47	(121)
2018–2025	Ealing Trailfinders	134	(951)
2025-	SU Agen	30	(227)
- Correct as of 12th October 2026

Craig Willis (born 4 February 1995) is an English rugby union player who has signed for SU Agen Lot-et-Garonne in the French Pro D2 in the 2025/26 season.

He is known as an expansive and attacking fly half who has previously played for Newcastle Falcons in the English Premiership and Ealing Trailfinders in the English Championship.

He signed his first professional contract with the Falcons after completing studies at Durham School having developed from a young age at Billingham RUFC During his time in the Falcons Academy he also moved over to play for local rivals Blaydon in 2014/15

He made his debut for Falcons as a 19 year old coming off the bench against the Romanian Falcons on 17 October 2014. He followed that up with a first start for the club at Full Back in another European tie away to Brive on 13 November 2015.

He went on to make 47 appearances for Newcastle Falcons as well as earning the academy player of the season award in the 2015/16 season. His Premiership debut came against Saracens in 2015, and he then kicked the winning penalty against Bath just a month later as he familiarised himself with English rugby's top tier. He scored a total of 121 points for the club.

Craig moved south signing for ambitious Championship Club Ealing Trailfinders in the summer of 2018.

He made his debut off the bench in a 36–31 victory at London Scottish on 18 September. He made his first start for the club a week later in a 42–24 home victory over Yorkshire Carnegie. Soon after he took over goalkicking duties at the club and started to show his real value scoring 16 points at home in a 41–35 win over Cornish Pirates. On 23 May 2019 he scored 21 points (1 try 8 conversions) in a 61–20 win over Coventry at Butts Park Arena, that started a run of 60 pts in 4 games. The club eventually finished second in the Championship (88 pts) to London Irish (99 pts) with Craig making 15 appearances and scoring 102 points. Ealing Trailfinders did have their revenge however beating London Irish in the Championship Cup Final 23–17 at Vallis Way. During the cup run Craig made 8 appearances scoring 27 points.

Season 2019/20 saw the first COVID reduced season which ended with Trailfinders' in second place behind Newcastle Falcons at the time of the league's suspension and Ealing left hanging in the Semi Finals in their attempt to retain the Championship Cup. This season also saw the arrival of Steven Shingler from Cardiff Blues and the two fly halves shared a lot of game time over the shortened season. The Cup started with a run of group games that Ealing won handsomely including an 80–17 home win over the Bedford Blues in which Craig scored 25 pts (1 try 10 conversions). He then scored 11 points in the QF win over Jersey Reds that left Ealing with a never to be played home Semi Final against Nottingham. The league season saw Craig play in 12 of the 13 games scoring 82 points (6 penalties 34 conversions).

Season 2020/21 was another season shorted by COVID and had a revised schedule where each team only played the other once with a two legged playoff at the end to decide the Champions. It was also made interesting by the demotion of Saracens and all their International stars into the Championship.

Prior to the league season there was a televised 3 team pre season competition called the Trailfinders Challenge Cup featuring Ealing Trailfinders, Saracens and Doncaster Knights. Ealing topped the competition winning all four games. Craig started 3 of the games including both victories over Saracens scoring 30 points (4 penalties 9 conversions).

During the following Championship Season Ealing topped the table winning nine of the ten games and ending up 5 points clear of second place Saracens. Of those ten games Craig started 8 scoring 60 points (2 penalties, 27 conversions). The two legged playoff however was a different kettle of fish with Saracens fielding a strong squad featuring several British & Irish Lions and World Cup Winners winning both games easily.

On 28 March 2021 Craig made his 50th appearance for Trailfinders in a 75–19 home win over Hartpury RFC scoring 14 points.

Season 2021/22 finally saw a return to full time rugby and was a hugely successful for Ealing Trailfinders with the club winning a League and Cup Double.

Ealing started the Championship season strongly with a 54–20 win at Hartpury with Craig scoring ten points, the sixteenth time he had scored 10 points or more for the club. After a defeat away to Cornish Pirates Ealing went on a run of 9 wins from 10 games with Craig and Steven Shingler sharing starting duties before a shock home defeat to Bedford Blues. After that Craig retained the starting shirt for the remainder of the season scoring 17 points at Jersey Reds, 16 points at London Scottish and 19 points at home to Cornish Pirates. Ealing secured the title with a 60–10 home win over Richmond RFC on 2 April. Craig finished second in the league scoring charts with 143 points with Steven Shingler in eighth position with 94 points.

The Championship Cup took place after the Championship season was completed. The club made the decision to use this as more of a development tournament and as a result Craig was only used when required making two substitute appearances including kicking an important penalty in the 19–13 win over Coventry RFC.

Season 2022/23 was a very hard-fought season between Jersey Reds and Ealing Trailfinders with Jersey winning the Championship and Ealing winning the Championship Cup. Craig again finished second in the League scoring charts with 146 points. Craig scored 10 or more points on 9 of his 16 appearances in the Championship however on 25 March 2023 he suffered a season ending shoulder injury against Cornish Pirates that meant he missed the Championship run in and the Championship Cup Semi Final and Final. On 13 January 2024 Craig won his 100th Trailfinders cap against Caldy RFC in a 58–24 victory scoring 10 points.

Season 2023/24 started with a block of Premiership Cup games however Craig missed these whilst recovering from his shoulder surgery. He was however back in charge for the first Championship game of the season. Ealing stormed to the title with Craig starting 14 games and scoring 144 points with 10 or more points in 9 of those games. A minor injury against Ampthill on 4 May meant that he missed the final run in to the title although the league was already won at that point.

On 24 July 2024, Craig was announced as the new attack coach at Wimbledon RFC.

Season 2024/25 was another one with huge success for Ealing Trailfinders, winning the Championship with a 13-point margin and reaching the Semi Finals of the Premiership Cup. Again game time at fly half was split with the incoming Dan Jones from Scarlets. The pair finished fifth and eighth on the League scoring charts with Jones scoring 130 points and Willis 120. Again Craig scored 10 or more points on four occasions during the season.

In June 2025 Craig signed a contract with SU Agen Lot-et-Garonne in the French Pro D2.

On 23 June Ealing Trailfinders released a statement announcing Craig's departure with a video interview.

Professional Stats
Club	Season	Games	Starts	Tries	Pens	Cons	DGs	Points
Newcastle Falcons	2014/15	2	0	0	0	0	0	0
Newcastle Falcons	2015/16	22	10	0	11	10	0	53
Newcastle Falcons	2016/17	11	3	0	2	7	0	20
Newcastle Falcons	2017/18	12	6	2	1	10	0	33
Ealing Trailfinders	2018/19	23	18	5	8	40	0	129
Ealing Trailfinders	2019/20	19	13	1	8	55	0	139
Ealing Trailfinders	2020/21	14	13	0	7	36	0	93
Ealing Trailfinders	2021/22	20	12	0	10	57	0	144
Ealing Trailfinders	2022/23	20	19	4	6	65	0	168
Ealing Trailfinders	2023/24	14	14	2	8	54	0	142
Ealing Trailfinders	2024/25	24	9	3	3	56	0	136
SU Agen	2025/26	27	24	1	31	52	0	202
SU Agen	2026/27	3	3	0	1	11	0	25
TOTALS	-	209	141	18	96	451	0	1284
