= Mike Bulpitt =

English rugby union player

- Full name: Michael Philip Bulpitt
- Born: 12 April 1944 (age 82) Richmond, Yorkshire, England

Rugby union career
- Position: Wing
International career
Years	Team	Apps	(Points)
1970	England	1	(0)

Michael Philip Bulpitt (born 12 April 1944) is an English former rugby union international.

Born in Richmond, Yorkshire, Bulpitt played his early rugby with Chelmsford and Osterley as a centre, before moving to the wing when he joined Blackheath in the late 1960s. He gained an England cap against Scotland at Murrayfield in the 1970 Five Nations and appeared nine times for the Barbarians. He finished his career at London club Rosslyn Park.

== See also ==
- List of England national rugby union players
