= Kieran Murphy (rugby union) =

Scottish rugby union footballer

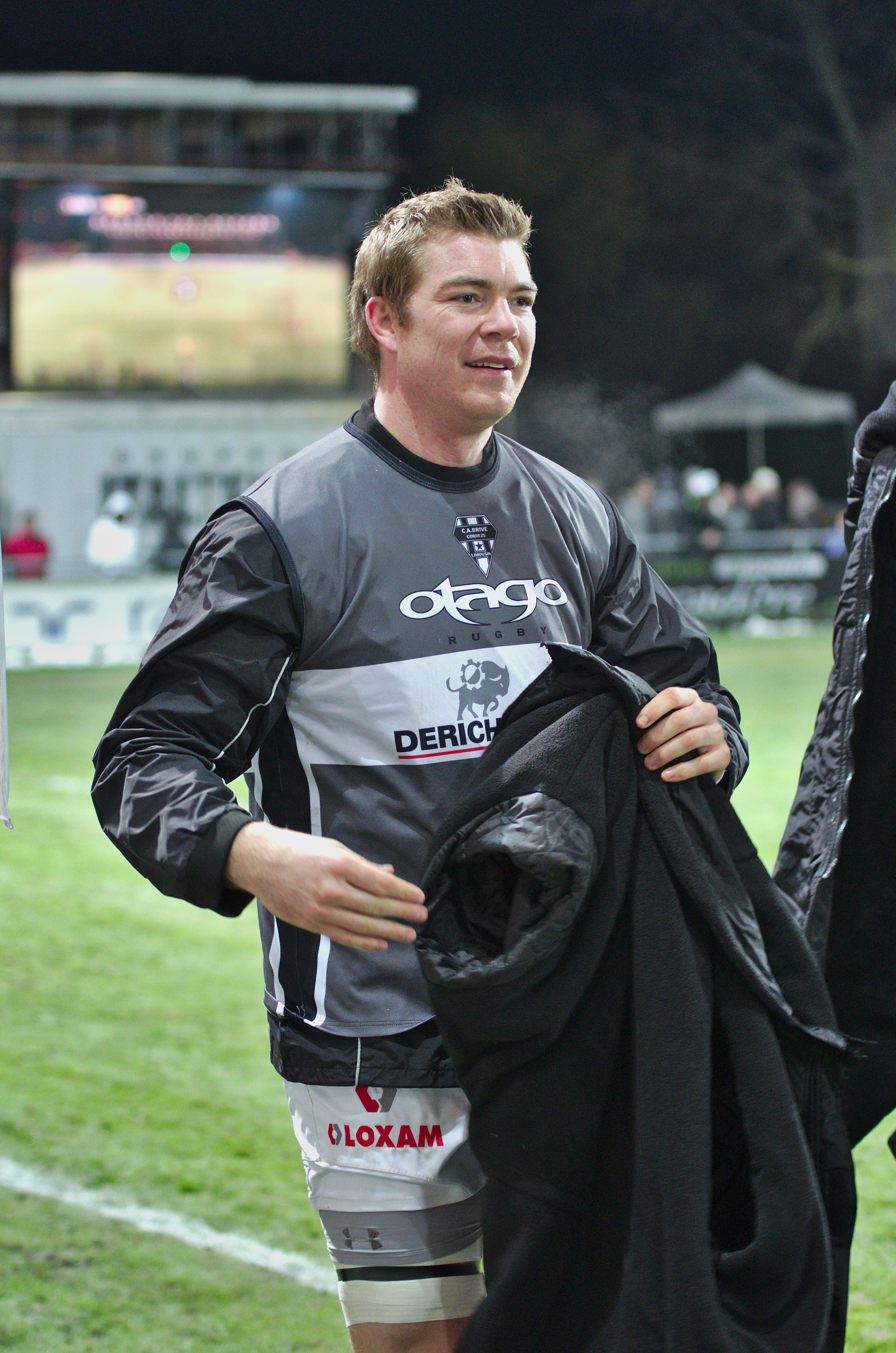
- Born: Kieran Murphy; 19 January 1988 (age 38) Aberdeen, Scotland
- Height: 191 cm (6 ft 3 in)
- Weight: 108 kg (17 st 0 lb)
- School: Bishopston Comprehensive, Gower College
- University: Birmingham

Rugby union career
- Position: Number 8
- Current team: Ealing Trailfinders
Senior career
Years	Team	Apps	(Points)
2010–13	Llandovery RFC	28	(55)
2013–15	Brive	22	(5)
2015–	London Welsh	18	(5)
- Correct as of 11 March 2016
Provincial / State sides
Years	Team	Apps	(Points)
2011–13	Scarlets	41	(30)
- Correct as of 11 March 2016

Kieran Murphy (born 19 January 1988) is a Scottish/Welsh rugby union player currently playing for Ealing Trailfinders in the RFU Championship. His position is at Number 8 and is known for his explosive power, superb speed off the base of the scrum and running support play around the field. Kieran previously played for Premiership side Llandovery RFC.

He was born in Aberdeen, Scotland moving to Swansea, Wales when he was two years old and consequently qualifies to play for both Scotland and Wales at international level. He played his junior rugby for South Gower RFC, attended Bishopston Comprehensive in Swansea and after returning from his studies at Birmingham University where he often played for Veseyans RFC he joined Mumbles RFC before catching the eye of the Scarlets.

He joined the Scarlets in June 2011 and made his debut for the first team against Leicester Tigers in the LV Cup match on 15 October 2011 at Parc y Scarlets. The Scarlets won the match 31-3 and Murphy scored two tries in a man of the match performance. His debut season has led to numerous plaudits from respected commentators, including former Llanelli, Wales and British Lion Fly half Phil Bennett, who tipped big things for Murphy in the future.

Kieran joined French side Brive from the Scarlets in 2013, as they prepared for a return to the top flight, and helped the club maintain its Top 14 status.

He joined London Welsh for the 2015–16 campaign.
