= Senitiki Nayalo =

Fijian rugby union player (born 1994)

Sentiki Nayalo
- Born: Sentiki Nayalo; 15 March 1994 (age 32) Weston-super-Mare
- Height: 1.87 m (6 ft 1 1/2 in)
- Weight: 114 kg (17 st 13 lb; 251 lb)
- School: Millfield

Rugby union career
- Position: Flanker / Number 8
- Current team: Coventry
Senior career
Years	Team	Apps	(Points)
2016–2018	London Irish	15	(15)
2018–2019	Edinburgh	23	(8)
2019-	Coventry		
- Correct as of 6 June 2018

Sentiki Nayalo (born 15 March 1994) is a Fijian rugby union player for Coventry and serving British Army Soldier.

'Tiki' signed to play for Coventry for the 2019–2020 season in the Greenking IPA RFU Championship. He played for London Irish in 2016 before moving north of the border to Guinness Pro14 side Edinburgh Rugby for the beginning of the 2018 campaign.

He serves as a Gunner in 7 Parachute Regiment, Royal Horse Artillery.
