= Rayn Smid =

South African rugby union player

- Born: 26 March 1992 (age 34) Cape Town, South Africa
- Height: 1.93 m (6 ft 4 in)
- Weight: 107 kg (16 st 12 lb; 236 lb)
- School: Rondebosch Boys' High School
- University: University of South Africa

Rugby union career
- Position: Number Eight
- Current team: Ealing
Youth career
- 2008–2013: Western Province
Amateur team(s)
Years	Team	Apps	(Points)
2012	UCT Ikey Tigers	5	(25)
Senior career
Years	Team	Apps	(Points)
2013–2015	Western Province	25	(45)
2014	→ I Cavalieri	3	(0)
2015–2016	Bristol	9	(0)
- Correct as of 30 December 2016

Rayn Smid (born 26 March 1992 in Cape Town) is a South African rugby union player, who plays for Ealing. His regular position is number eight or flanker.

== Career ==
=== Youth and Varsity Cup rugby ===
He represented Western Province at various youth competitions. In 2008, he played for their Under-16 side at the Grant Khomo Week tournament; in 2009, he played for their Under-18 side at the Academy Week tournament and in 2010, he played for the Under-18s at the Craven Week tournament. He played for the Western Province U19 side in the 2011 Under-19 Provincial Championship competition and for the Western Province U21 side in the Under-21 Provincial Championship in 2012 and 2013, helping them to winning the competition in 2013 as vice-captain of the side.

He also played for the UCT Ikey Tigers during the 2012 Varsity Cup competition, scoring five tries in five appearances, four of those tries coming in their match against the TUT Vikings.

=== Western Province ===
He was first included in the Western Province senior side for the 2013 Vodacom Cup competition. His first class debut came in their opening match of the season against near neighbours Boland Cavaliers. He scored his first senior try in their next match, at home to the Sharks XV and eventually started all nine of Western Province's matches during the competition.

His first appearance in the Currie Cup came a few months later, during the 2013 Currie Cup competition. He started the match against Griquas following a late injury to Rynhardt Elstadt, which was his only appearance in the competition.

He was also included in the Stormers wider training squad for the 2014 Super Rugby season.

At the end of 2014, Smid joined Italian side I Cavalieri on a short-term deal. He made two appearances for them in the 2014–2015 National Championship of Excellence and one in the 2015 Trophy of Excellence before returning to Cape Town prior to the 2015 Vodacom Cup competition.

=== Bristol Rugby ===
On 24 September 2015, English RFU Championship side Bristol announced that Smid would join them for the 2015–16 season. He made eight appearances for them during the 2015–16 season, but made just a single appearance for them in 2016–17, before leaving the club by mutual consent at the end of 2016.

=== Ealing Trailfinders ===
In January 2017 Smid joined the RFU Championship side Ealing Trailfinders, where he currently plays. Smid has enjoyed great success with the Trailfinders, appearing in almost every match since joining in 2017, frequently as captain. He was named to The Rugby Paper's Championship Dream Team for the 2018/19 season after scoring 11 tries.
