= Luke Cole (rugby union) =

English rugby union footballer and coach

- Born: Luke Cole; 7 November 1993 (age 33) Halifax, England
- Height: 5 ft 9 in (1.75 m)
- Weight: 96 kg (15 st 2 lb)
- School: Prince Henry's Grammar School, Otley

Rugby union career
- Position: Hooker
- Current team: Rotherham Titans
Senior career
Years	Team	Apps	(Points)
2014–2015	Yorkshire Carnegie		
2015–2016	Gloucester Rugby	3	(0)
2016–2018	Rotherham Titans	0	(0)
2018–	Nottingham	0	(0)

Luke Cole (born 7 November 1993) is an English rugby union player, who plays for Rotherham Titans in the RFU Championship.

Cole was part of Yorkshire Carnegie academy where he was an unused replacement for the game against Rotherham during the 2014–15 season but was dual-registered to Otley where he impressed everyone with his ability on the ball and carrying. Cole moved down south England to Gloucester Rugby academy system during the 2015–16 season.

On 6 May 2016, he signed his first professional contract with Rotherham Titans from the 2016–17 season. On 21 March 2018, Cole signed for Championship rivals Nottingham ahead of the 2018–19 season.

Cole currently serves as head coach of Halifax RUFC, a team competing in the Yorkshire 4 league.
