= Duncan Madsen =

Scotland international rugby union player

- Born: Duncan Madsen

Rugby union career
Amateur team(s)
Years	Team	Apps	(Points)
197?-??	Gosforth RFC		
International career
Years	Team	Apps	(Points)
- Scotland

Duncan Madsen is a former Scottish rugby union footballer.

He was capped by Scotland and was part of the 1976 & 1977 Gosforth team that won the 1975–76 John Player Cup and the 1976–77 John Player Cup.
