= Will Wilson (rugby union) =

English rugby union player (born 1997)

- Full name: William Willis Wilson
- Born: 29 January 1997 (age 29)
- Height: 1.80 m (5 ft 11 in)
- Weight: 100 kg (220 lb)
- University: University of Oxford

Rugby union career
- Position: Backrow
- Current team: Griquas (on loan from Wasps)
Senior career
Years	Team	Apps	(Points)
2019–present	Griquas	4	(0)
- Correct as of 7 July 2019
International career
Years	Team	Apps	(Points)
2018	England Sevens	5	(10)
- Correct as of 7 July 2019

William Willis Wilson (born 29 January 1997) is an English rugby union and rugby sevens player. He currently plays rugby union for South African Currie Cup side Griquas, on loan from English Premiership side Wasps. His regular position is loose forward.

In 2018, Wilson represented the England Sevens team at the 2018 Hong Kong Sevens tournament.
