= Malcolm Young (rugby union) =

England international rugby union player

- Born: 4 January 1946 (age 80) Mickley, Northumberland, England

Rugby union career
- Position: Scrum-half
International career
Years	Team	Apps	(Points)
1977–79	England	10	(15)

Malcolm Young (born 4 January 1946) is an English former rugby union international.

Born in Northumberland, Young was educated at Cambridge University. He won his Cambridge blue for football (soccer) rather than rugby union, as a broken hand at the time meant he could only play the former sport.

Young, a scrum-half, played for Gosforth RFC and was a John Player Cup-winning captain. He was capped in 10 Tests for England during the late 1970s. His first call up in 1977 came on the day of his 31st birthday and he scored a debut try, against Scotland at Twickenham. He was also part of the "Rest of the World" that toured South Africa in 1977.

== See also ==
- List of England national rugby union players
