= Colin White (rugby union) =

England international rugby union player

- Born: 31 March 1947 Newcastle-upon-Tyne, England
- Died: 19 January 2011 (aged 63)

Rugby union career
- Position: Prop
International career
Years	Team	Apps	(Points)
1983–84	England	4	(0)

Colin White (31 March 1947 - 19 January 2011) was an English rugby union international.

Born in Newcastle-upon-Tyne, White was a prop with local club Gosforth RFC, where he played in two John Player Cup title wins and served as club captain. While working as tree surgeon in 1978, he lost three fingers on his right hand in a chainsaw accident, but was able to continue his career. He gained an England in 1983, debuting in a win over the All Blacks at home, then was capped a further three times in the 1984 Five Nations Championship.

== See also ==
- List of England national rugby union players
