= Richard Breakey =

Scotland international rugby union player

- Born: Richard William Breakey; 14 November 1956 (age 69) Consett, England
- University: Durham University

Rugby union career
- Position: Fly Half
Amateur team(s)
Years	Team	Apps	(Points)
- Gosforth
Provincial / State sides
Years	Team	Apps	(Points)
- Anglo-Scots
International career
Years	Team	Apps	(Points)
1976-78	Scotland 'B'	2	
1978	Scotland	1	(0)

Richard Breakey (born 14 November 1956) is a former Scotland international rugby union player. He played for Scotland in the 1978 Five Nations tournament.

== Early life and education ==
Breakey was educated at Fettes College and Durham University (Hatfield College). His older brother Nigel was an anaesthetist who played rugby for Scotland Schoolboys and Cambridge University.

== Rugby union career ==
=== International career ===
He was capped twice by Scotland 'B', from 1976 to 1978.

Breakey made his first full senior cap and only test appearance for Scotland as a Fly-half in the 1978 Five Nations match against England, held at Murrayfield, which would result in a 0–15 defeat for the Scots. He replaced the injured Ian McGeechan.

Breakey was later an unused replacement for Scotland in the final match of the 1981 Five Nations Championship against Ireland.
