= 2016–17 Anglo-Welsh Cup =

English rugby union cup season

Tournament details
- Countries: England; Wales
- Tournament format(s): Round-robin and knockout
- Date: 4 November 2016 – 18 March 2017

Tournament statistics
- Teams: 16
- Matches played: 35
- Attendance: 288,834 (8,252 per match)
- Highest attendance: 25,849 (Leicester Tigers v Northampton Saints)
- Lowest attendance: 1,370 (Cardiff v Worcester Warriors)
- Top point scorer(s): (England) Freddie Burns (Leicester Tigers) 64
- Top try scorer(s): (Wales) Josh Adams (Worcester Warriors) 6

Final
- Venue: Twickenham Stoop
- Champions: Leicester Tigers (8th title)
- Runners-up: Exeter Chiefs

The 2016–17 Anglo-Welsh Cup was the 45th season of England's national rugby union cup competition, and the 11th to follow the Anglo-Welsh Cup format. The competition returned after a one-year hiatus due to being dropped due to the 2015 Rugby World Cup in England.

The competition consisted of the four Welsh Pro12 teams and the twelve English Premiership clubs arranged in pools of three English and one Welsh team. English clubs were allocated to the pools depending on their final positions in the 2015–16 Aviva Premiership. Teams played two home and two away pool matches, with teams in Pools 1 and 4 playing each other and teams in Pools 2 and 3 playing each other. The top team from each pool qualified for the semi-finals. The competition took place during the Autumn International window and during the Six Nations.

Saracens were defending champions after claiming the cup with a 23–20 victory over Exeter Chiefs in the 2014–15 final at Franklin's Gardens in Northampton. This was Saracens second title in the competition. The 2016–17 Anglo-Welsh Cup was won by Leicester Tigers who won their eighth cup title by defeating Exeter Chiefs 16–12 in the final held at Twickenham Stoop. Freddie Burns had an excellent tournament for the Tigers, scoring 64 points overall including 11 in the final, to finish as the competition's top point scorer, while Josh Adams was top try scorer with 6 tries from only 2 games for Worcester Warriors.

== Teams & locations ==
Locations of the 2016–17 Anglo-Welsh Cup teams

Club	Coach	Captain	Stadium	Capacity	City/Area
(England) Bath	(New Zealand) Todd Blackadder	(England) Guy Mercer	The Recreation Ground	14,500	Bath, Somerset, England
(England) Bristol	(England) Andy Robinson	(Samoa) Jack Lam	Ashton Gate	27,000	Bristol, England
(Wales) Cardiff Blues	(England) Danny Wilson	(Wales) Gethin Jenkins	BT Sport Cardiff Arms Park	12,125	Cardiff, Glamorgan, Wales
(England) Exeter Chiefs	(England) Rob Baxter	(England) Jack Yeandle	Sandy Park	12,600	Exeter, Devon, England
(England) Gloucester	(Ireland) David Humphreys	(Scotland) Greig Laidlaw	Kingsholm Stadium	16,500	Gloucester, Gloucestershire, England
(England) Harlequins	(England) John Kingston	(England) Danny Care	Twickenham Stoop	14,816	Twickenham, Greater London, England
(England) Leicester Tigers	(England) Richard Cockerill	(England) Tom Youngs	Welford Road	25,800	Leicester, Leicestershire, England
(England) Newcastle Falcons	(England) Dean Richards	(England) Will Welch	Kingston Park	10,200	Newcastle, Tyne and Wear, England
(Wales) Newport Gwent Dragons	(Wales) Kingsley Jones	(Wales) T. Rhys Thomas	Rodney Parade	8,500	Newport, Wales
(England) Northampton Saints	(England) Jim Mallinder	(England) Tom Wood	Franklin's Gardens	15,500	Northampton, Northamptonshire, England
(Wales) Ospreys	(Wales) Steve Tandy	(Wales) Alun Wyn Jones	Liberty Stadium; St. Helen's; Brewery Field	20,827; 4,500; 8,000	Swansea, West Glamorgan, Wales; Swansea, West Glamorgan, Wales; Bridgend, Mid Glamorgan, Wales
(England) Sale Sharks	(England) Steve Diamond	(England) Josh Beaumont	AJ Bell Stadium	12,000	Salford, Greater Manchester, England
(England) Saracens	(Ireland) Mark McCall	(England) Brad Barritt	Allianz Park	10,000	Barnet, Greater London, England
(Wales) Scarlets	(New Zealand) Wayne Pivac	(Wales) Ken Owens	Parc y Scarlets	14,870	Llanelli, Carmarthenshire, Wales
(England) Wasps	(Wales) Dai Young	(England) Joe Launchbury	Ricoh Arena	32,609	Coventry, West Midlands, England
(England) Worcester Warriors	(Scotland) Carl Hogg	(South Africa) Gerrit-Jan van Velze	Sixways Stadium	12,024	Worcester, Worcestershire, England

== Pool stages ==
Points system

The points scoring system for the pool stages will be as follows:

- 4 points for a win
- 2 points for a draw
- 1 bonus point for scoring four or more tries in a match (TB)
- 1 bonus point for a loss by seven points or less (LB)

=== Pool 1 v Pool 4 ===
Pool 1
Team	P	W	D	L	PF	PA	PD	TF	TA	TB	LB	Pts
(England) Saracens (1)	4	3	0	1	122	91	31	16	12	4	1	17
(England) Northampton Saints	4	3	0	1	113	66	47	14	7	1	1	14
(Wales) Newport Gwent Dragons	4	1	0	3	58	105	−47	7	13	1	0	5
(England) Bath Rugby	4	0	1	3	73	98	−25	9	10	0	2	4
Updated: 5 February 2017; Source: Premiership Rugby

Pool 4
Team	P	W	D	L	PF	PA	PD	TF	TA	TB	LB	Pts
(England) Leicester Tigers (4)	4	3	0	1	110	72	38	13	10	1	0	13
(England) Gloucester	4	2	1	1	90	81	9	13	8	1	1	12
(England) Newcastle Falcons	4	2	0	2	68	74	−6	6	8	0	0	8
(Wales) Scarlets	4	1	0	3	92	139	−47	10	20	1	0	5
Updated: 5 February 2017; Source: Premiership Rugby

==== Round 1 (England) ====
4 November 2016
19:45

(1 BP) Bath (England)	20–21	(England) Leicester Tigers
Try: J. Wilson 9' m J. Williams 65' m Bowden 74' c Con: Hastings (1/3) 74'; Pen: Hastings (1/1) 3'	Report	Try: Hamilton 12' c Worth 23' m Con: F. Burns (1/2) 12'; Pen: F. Burns (3/3) 17', 47', 51'

Recreation Ground
Attendance: 13,723
Referee: Dan Jones

5 November 2016
15:00

(1 BP) Gloucester (England)	36–32	(England) Saracens (2 BP)
Try: Mullis 9' m Thomas 47' m Purdy 53' c Halaifonua (2) 57' c, 79' m Penalty try 66' c Con: Evans (3/6) 53', 57', 66'	Report	Try: Griffiths (2) 6' c, 18' m Spencer 29' c Whiteley 61' c Con: Whiteley (2/3) 6', 61'; Spencer (1/1) 29'; Pen: Spencer (2/2) 12', 24'

Kingsholm
Attendance: 11,660
Referee: Matthew O'Grady

6 November 2016
15:00

Newcastle Falcons (England)	16–24	(England) Northampton Saints
Try: A. Tait 68' c Con: Delany (1/1) 68'; Pen: Delany (3/3) 3', 40', 56'	Report	Try: Collins 37' c Hutchinson 76' m Con: Olver (1/2) 37'; Pen: Olver (4/4) 7', 26', 43', 62'

Kingston Park
Attendance: 4,257
Referee: Greg MacDonald

==== Round 2 ====
11 November 2016
19:00

(1 BP) Scarlets (Wales)	44–21	(England) Bath
Try: Macleod 53' c T. Phillips 64' c E. Phillips 69' c Condy (2) 76' c, 79' c Con: Jones (5/5) 53', 64', 69', 76', 79'; Pen: Jones (3/3) 6', 21', 33'	Report	Try: Lahiff 25' c Dunn 30' c J. Williams 35' c Con: Priestland (3/3) 25', 30', 35

Parc y Scarlets
Attendance: 3,538
Referee: Christophe Ridley

12 November 2016
13:00

(1 BP) Saracens (England)	29–18	(England) Newcastle Falcons
Try: Tompkins 25' c Spurling 54' c Saunders 58' m Perkins 70' c Con: Whiteley (3/4) 25', 54', 70'; Pen: Whiteley (1/1) 39'	Report	Try: Fonua 22' c Socino 73' m Con: Connon (1/2) 22'; Pen: Connon (2/2) 14', 47'

Allianz Park
Attendance: 7,807
Referee: Mike Adamson

12 November 2016
15:00

Northampton Saints (England)	19–13	(England) Gloucester (1BP)
Try: Clare 37' c Con: Olver (1/1) 37'; Pen: Olver (3/3) 23', 28', 51'; Drop: Olver (1/1) 56'	Report	Try: Thorley 65' m D. Thomas 76' m Pen: B. Burns (1/1) 10'

Franklin's Gardens
Attendance: 14,011
Referee: Craig Evans

12 November 2016
15:00

(1 BP) Leicester Tigers (England)	42–3	(Wales) Newport Gwent Dragons
Try: O. Williams 17' c Thompstone 30' m Bateman 36' c F. Burns 39' m Genge 74' m Roberts 80' c Con: F. Burns (2/4) 17', 36'; Worth (1/2) 80'; Pen: F. Burns (2/2) 11', 58'	Report	Pen: G. Jones (1/1) 6'

Welford Road
Attendance: 18,750
Referee: Andrew Jackson

==== Round 1 (Wales) ====
18 November 2016
19:30

(1BP) Newport Gwent Dragons (Wales)	36–21	(Wales) Scarlets
Try: Beard (2) 30' c, 80' c Crosswell 51' c Meyer 57' c Keddie 65' m Con: O'Brien (3/4) 31', 52', 58'; Robson (1/1) 80'	Report	Try: D. Hughes 39' c Baldwin 62' m Con: D. Jones (1/2) 40'; Pen: D. Jones (3/3) 5', 11', 23'

Rodney Parade
Attendance: 3,539
Referee: Mike Adamson

==== Round 3 ====
27 January 2017
19:05

Scarlets (Wales)	17–32	(England) Saracens (1 BP)
Try: Allen 52' c McBryde 66' c Con: Maynard (1/1) 52'; McBryde (1/1) 66'; Pen: Maynard (1/1) 42'	Report	Try: Tompkins 16' c Gallagher 23' m Ellery 62' c Whiteley 74' c Con: Malins 16' (1/2); Whiteley (2/2) 62', 74'; Pen: Malins (2/2) 1', 40'

Parc y Scarlets
Attendance: 3,796
Referee: Jack Makepeace

27 January 2017
19:45

Bath (England)	17–17	(England) Gloucester
Try: Brew 74' m Pen: Priestland (4/4) 32', 47', 54', 58'	Report	Try: Dawidiuk 9' c Vellacott 77' c Con: Hook (2/2) 9', 77'; Pen: Hook (1/1) 52'

Recreation Ground
Attendance: 12,680
Referee: Andrew Jackson

28 January 2017
15:00

Leicester Tigers (England)	27–20	(England) Northampton Saints (1 BP)
Try: Evans 19' c Barrow 32' c H. Thacker 54' c Con: O. Williams (3/3) 20', 34', 54'; Pen: O. Williams (2/2) 27', 75'	Report	Try: Mallinder 22' m Tuitavake 67' c Hutchinson 79' m Con: Olver (1/3) 68'; Pen: Olver (1/1) 3'

Welford Road
Attendance: 25,849
Referee: Ben Whitehouse

29 January 2017
15:00

Newport Gwent Dragons (Wales)	6–18	(England) Newcastle Falcons
Pen: Prydie (2/2) 8', 28'	Report	Try: M. Wilson 20' c Agulla 31' m Con: Takulua (1/2) 20'; Pen: Takulua (2/2) 37', 42'

Rodney Parade
Attendance: 3,746
Referee: John Meredith

==== Round 4 ====
3 February 2017
19:45

(1 BP) Northampton Saints (England)	50–10	(Wales) Scarlets
Try: Foden (2) 6' m, 28 'c Gibson 17' c Paterson 39' m Mallinder 43' c K. Pisi 49 'c Fish (2) 56' m, 80' c Con: Myler (5/8) 17, 28, 43, 49, 80	Report	Try: T. Williams 12' c Con: McBryde (1/1) 12'; Pen: McBryde (1/1) 3'

Franklin's Gardens
Attendance: 13,177
Referee: Craig Maxwell Keys

4 February 2017
15:00

Gloucester (England)	24–13	(Wales) Newport Gwent Dragons
Try: Orr 38' c Trinder 46' c Vellacott 68' c Con: L. Evans (3/3) 40', 47', 69'; Pen: L. Evans (1/1) 52'	Report	Try: Screech (2) 55'm, 78' m Pen: Prydie (1/1) 26'

Kingsholm
Attendance: 8,310
Referee: Rhys Thomas

4 February 2017
15:00

Newcastle Falcons (England)	16–15	(England) Bath (1 BP)
Try: Kibirige 74' c Con: Willis (1/1) 75'; Pen: Willis (3/3) 40', 44', 60'	Report	Try: J. Wilson 49' m Homer 64' c Con: Hastings (1/2) 65'; Pen: Hastings (1/1) 30'

Kingston Park
Attendance: 3,984
Referee: Dewi Phillips

5 February 2017
15:00

(1 BP) Saracens (England)	29–20	(England) Leicester Tigers
Try: Barrington 11' c Earle 15 m' Tompkins 23' c Whiteley 79' c Con: Whiteley (2/3) 11', 80'; Tompkins (1/1) 23'; Pen: Whiteley (1/1) 53'	Report	Try: Hamilton 33' c McGuigan 49' c Con: F. Burns (2/2) 34', 50'; Pen: F. Burns (2/2) 20', 63'

Allianz Park
Attendance: 8,734
Referee: Greg MacDonald

=== Pool 2 v Pool 3 ===
Pool 2
Team	P	W	D	L	PF	PA	PD	TF	TA	TB	LB	Pts
(England) Exeter Chiefs (2)	4	3	0	1	164	66	98	25	9	3	0	15
(Wales) Ospreys	4	3	0	1	94	58	36	13	8	2	1	15
(England) Sale Sharks	4	3	0	1	82	52	30	11	6	1	0	13
(England) Worcester Warriors	4	2	0	2	116	153	−37	18	22	2	1	11
Updated: 5 February 2017; Source: Premiership Rugby

Pool 3
Team	P	W	D	L	PF	PA	PD	TF	TA	TB	LB	Pts
(England) Harlequins (3)	4	3	0	1	82	62	20	10	8	1	1	14
(England) Wasps	4	1	0	3	102	110	−8	16	16	1	1	6
(England) Bristol	4	1	0	3	72	97	−25	9	13	0	2	6
(Wales) Cardiff Blues	4	0	0	4	73	187	−114	10	30	2	0	2
Updated: 5 February 2017; Source: Premiership Rugby

==== Round 1 (England) ====
4 November 2016
19:45

(1 BP) Worcester Warriors (England)	31–25	(England) Bristol (1 BP)
Try: Adams (2) 5' m, 44' c Stelling (2) 40' m, 64' c Shillcock 53' c Con: Shillcock (2/4) 44', 64'; Dowsett (1/1) 53'	Report	Try: Nemsadze 13' c Wallace 67' c Varndell 72' m Con: Searle (2/3) 13', 67'; Pen: Searle (2/2) 20', 25'

Sixways
Attendance: 6,331
Referee: Andrew Jackson

4 November 2016
20:15

Sale Sharks (England)	17–13	(England) Wasps (1 BP)
Try: Jennings 18' c Bedlow 44' c Con: Arscott (2/2) 18', 44'; Pen: Arscott (1/1) 54'	Report	Try: Thompson 34' m Umaga 69' m Pen: Eastgate (1/1) 14'

AJ Bell Stadium
Attendance: 6,668
Referee: Christophe Ridley

5 November 2016
17:30

Harlequins (England)	29–15	(England) Exeter Chiefs
Try: Morris 14' m Walker 66' m A. Jones 71' c Con: Evans (1/3) 71'; Pen: Evans (4/4) 6', 24', 46', 61'	Report	Try: Short 17' m Taione 52' c Con: Simmonds (1/2) 52'; Pen: Simmonds (1/1) 47'

Twickenham Stoop
Attendance: 8,000
Referee: Craig Evans

==== Round 2 ====
11 November 2016
19:00

Bristol (England)	26–11	(England) Sale Sharks
Try: Woodward 9' m R. Williams 34' m Tovey 49' c Con: Searle (1/3) 9'; Pen: Searle (2/2) 22', 58'; Jarvis (1/1) 68'	Report	Try: Aulika 44' m Pen: Mugford (1/1) 8'; Arscott (1/1) 63'

Ashton Gate
Attendance: 7,350
Referee: Greg MacDonald

11 November 2016
19:30

(1 BP) Ospreys (Wales)	12–15	(England) Harlequins
Try: O'Flaherty 2' m Howells 33' c Con: Price (1/2) 33'	Report	Try: Naoupu 23' c Matthews 59' m Con: Swiel (1/2) 23'; Pen: Swiel (1/1) 73'

St. Helen's
Attendance: 3,127
Referee: Mike Hudson

13 November 2016
15:00

(1 BP) Exeter Chiefs (England)	62–25	(Wales) Cardiff Blues (1BP)
Try: Malton 5' c Penalty try 13' m Campagnaro 16' c Welch 27' c S. Simmonds 38' m Hendrickson 43' c Townsend 53' c Johnson 60' m Innard 70' c Lawday 74' m Con: J. Simmonds (6/10) 5', 16', 27', 43', 53', 70'	Report	Try: Sheekey 3' c Beal 48' m R. Williams (2) 57' m, 60' m Con: J. Evans (1/4) 3'; Pen: J. Evans (1/1) 1'

Sandy Park
Attendance: 9,595
Referee: Luke Pearce

13 November 2016
15:00

(1BP) Wasps (England)	62–10	(England) Worcester Warriors
Try: Cruse 18' c T. Young 31' c Willis 39' m Robson (2) 41' c, 68' m Macken 47' c Howe 55' m Umaga (2) 61' c, 80' c P. O'Connor 77' m Con: Eastgate (4/6); O. James (2/3)	Report	Try: Adams (2) 21' m, 26' m

Ricoh Arena
Attendance: 12,007
Referee: Adam Jones

==== Round 1 (Wales) ====
18 November 2016
19:15

Cardiff Blues (Wales)	7–31	(Wales) Ospreys (1BP)
Try: Rhodri Davies 16' c Con: Ben Jones 16'	Report	Try: Scott Otten 2' c Brendon Leonard 48' c Tom O'Flaherty (2) 61' c, 78' m Dan Evans 76' m Con: Phil Jones (3/5) 2', 48', 61'

BT Sport Cardiff Arms Park
Attendance: 4,094
Referee: Ben Whitehouse

==== Round 3 ====
27 January 2017
20:15

(1 BP) Sale Sharks (England)	41–3	(Wales) Cardiff Blues
Try: Denny Solomona 9' c Jonathan Mills 22' c Laurence Pearce (2) 36' m, 49' m Neil Briggs 55' m James Flynn 68'm Penalty 79' c Con: AJ MacGinty (2/5) 9', 22'; Byron McGuigan (1/2) 79'	Report	Pen: Jarrod Evans 28'

AJ Bell Stadium
Attendance: 3,498
Referee: Craig Evans

28 January 2017
15:00

Ospreys (Wales)	20–14	(England) Bristol (1 BP)
Try: Dafydd Howells 1' c Sam Underhill 76' c Con: Luke Price (2/2) 1', 76'; Pen: Luke Price (2) 11', 60'	Report	Try: Max Crumpton 19' c Marc Jones 73' c Con: Billy Searle (2/2) 19', 73'

Brewery Field, Bridgend
Attendance: 3,352
Referee: Daniel Jones

28 January 2017
15:00

(1 BP) Worcester Warriors (England)	22–28	(England) Harlequins (1 BP)
Try: Wynand Olivier 4' c Bryce Heem 9' c Joe Taufete'e 45' m Con: Ryan Mills (2/3) 5', 10'; Pen: Ryan Mills 64'	Report	Try: Charlie Walker 24' c Charlie Matthews 49' c Alofa Alofa (2) 57' c, 70' c Con: Ruaridh Jackson (4/4) 24', 50', 58', 71'

Sixways
Attendance: 7,114
Referee: Christophe Ridley

28 January 2017
15:00

(1 BP) Exeter Chiefs (England)	52–5	(England) Wasps
Try: Michele Campagnaro (3) 2' c, 15'c, 53' c Mitch Lees 9' c Sam Simmonds 26' c Stu Townsend 32' m Shaun Malton 44' c Lachlan Turner 79' m Con: Joe Simmonds (6/8) 2', 9', 15', 26', 44', 53'	Report	Try: Will Rowlands 5' m

Sandy Park
Attendance: 10,551
Referee: Greg MacDonald

==== Round 4 ====
3 February 2017
19:45

(1 BP) Harlequins (England)	10–13	(England) Sale Sharks
Try: Penalty try 57'; Con: Ruaridh Jackson (1/1) 57'; Pen: Ruaridh Jackson 20'	Report	Try: Neil Briggs 35' c Con: Will Addison (1/1) 35'; Pen: Will Addison (2) 2', 77'

Twickenham Stoop
Attendance: 6,932
Referee: Matthew O'Grady

4 February 2017
15:00

(1 BP) Cardiff Blues (Wales)	38–53	(England) Worcester Warriors (1 BP)
Try: Cam Dolan 17' c Harri Millard (2) 39' c, 58' c Tomos Williams 43' c Jarrod Evans 71' c Con: Steven Shingler (4/4) 17', 39', 43', 58'; Jarrod Evans (1/1) 71'; Pen: Steven Shingler 14'	Report	Try: Josh Adams (2) 9' c, 29' c Jack Singleton 20' m Sam Lewis 23' c Wynand Olivier (2) 35' c, 67' m Bryce Heem 49' c Alafoti Fa'osiliva 55' m Con: Ryan Mills (5/8) 9', 23', 29', 35', 49'; Pen: Ryan Mills 8'

BT Sport Cardiff Arms Park
Attendance: 1,370
Referee: Steve Lee

5 February 2017
15:00

Bristol (England)	7–35	(England) Exeter Chiefs (1 BP)
Try: Jamal Ford-Robinson 71' c Con: Callum Sheedy (1/1) 72'	Report	Try: Shaun Malton (2) 4' c, 35' c Henry Slade 54' c Max Bodilly 64'c Penalty try 78' c Con: Joe Simmonds (5/5) 5', 35', 55', 65', 79'

Ashton Gate
Attendance: 8,875
Referee: Ian Davies

5 February 2017
15:00

Wasps (England)	22–31	(Wales) Ospreys (1 BP)
Try: Brendan Macken (2) 9' c, 30' m Guy Armitage 68' c Con: Warren Seals (2/3) 10', 69; Pen: Warren Seals 46'	Report	Try: Jay Baker 13' c Dan Baker 34' c Kieron Fonotia 70' c Hanno Dirksen 79' c Con: Luke Price (4/4) 14', 35', 72', 80'; Pen: Luke Price 52'

Ricoh Arena
Attendance: 11,409
Referee: Dean Richards

== Semi-finals ==
11 March 2017
18:00

Saracens (England)	10 – 32	(England) Leicester Tigers
Try: Henry Taylor 28' m Matt Gallagher 59' m	Report	Try: George Worth 8' c Luke Hamilton 39' c Ellis Genge 42' m Freddie Burns 68' c Con: Freddie Burns (3/4) 8', 40', 69'; Pen: Freddie Burns (2) 26', 56'

Allianz Park
Attendance: 4,747
Referee: Luke Pearce

12 March 2017
15:00

Exeter Chiefs (England)	24 – 7	(England) Harlequins
Try: Lachie Turner 9' c Max Bodilly 14' c Julian Salvi 55' m Sam Simmonds 76' m Con: Joe Simmonds (2/4) 10', 15'	Report	Try: Calum Waters 78' c Con: James Lang (1/1) 79'

Sandy Park
Attendance: 9,419
Referee: Daniel Jones

== Final ==
19 March 2017
15:00

(England) Exeter Chiefs	12 – 16	(England) Leicester Tigers
Try: James Short 15' m Sam Simmonds 77' c Con: Joe Simmonds (0/1); Will Hooley (1/1) 77'	Report	Try: Tom Brady 18' c Con: Freddie Burns (1/1) 19' c Pen: Freddie Burns (3) 12', 25', 40'(+1)

Twickenham Stoop
Attendance: 6,834
Referee: Tom Foley

FB	15	(Australia) Lachlan Turner
RW	14	(England) Matt Jess
OC	13	(England) Max Bodilly
IC	12	(England) Sam Hill
LW	11	(England) James Short
FH	10	(England) Joe Simmonds
SH	9	(England) Jack Maunder
N8	8	(England) Sam Simmonds
OF	7	(Australia) Julian Salvi (c)
BF	6	(England) Dave Ewers
RL	5	(Scotland) Ollie Atkins
LL	4	(Wales) Damian Welch
TP	3	(Australia) Greg Holmes
HK	2	(South Africa) Shaun Malton
LP	1	(England) Carl Rimmer
Replacements:
HK	16	(Tonga) Elvis Taione
PR	17	(England) Billy Keast
PR	18	(Scotland) Jack Owlett
FL	19	(England) Sam Skinner
N8	20	(England) Tom Johnson
SH	21	(England) Haydn Thomas
FH	22	(England) Will Hooley
CE	23	(England) Tom Hendrickson
Coach:
(England) Rob Baxter

FB	15	(England) George Worth
RW	14	(Australia) Peter Betham
OC	13	(England) Mathew Tait (c)
IC	12	(Wales) Jack Roberts
LW	11	(England) Tom Brady
FH	10	(England) Freddie Burns
SH	9	(New Zealand) Jono Kitto
N8	8	(Australia) Lachlan McCaffrey
OF	7	(England) Harry Thacker
BF	6	(Zimbabwe) Mike Williams
RL	5	(England) Graham Kitchener
LL	4	(England) Harry Wells
TP	3	(England) Fraser Balmain
HK	2	(England) George McGuigan
LP	1	(England) Ellis Genge
Replacements:
HK	16	(England) Tom Youngs
PR	17	(Italy) Michele Rizzo
PR	18	(England) Greg Bateman
LK	19	(England) Dominic Barrow
FL	20	(Wales) Luke Hamilton
SH	21	(England) Ben White
FH	22	(Wales) Owen Williams
CE	23	(England) Matt Smith
Coach:
(New Zealand) Aaron Mauger

== Attendances ==
- Attendances do not include the final at Twickenham Stoop.

Club	Home games	Total	Average	Highest	Lowest	% Capacity
(England) Bath	2	26,403	13,202	13,723	12,680	91%
(England) Bristol	2	16,225	8,113	8,875	7,350	30%
(Wales) Cardiff Blues	2	5,464	2,732	4,094	1,370	23%
(England) Exeter Chiefs	3	29,565	9,855	10,551	9,419	78%
(England) Gloucester	2	19,970	9,985	11,660	8,310	62%
(England) Harlequins	2	14,932	7,466	8,000	6,932	50%
(England) Leicester Tigers	2	44,599	22,300	25,849	18,750	86%
(England) Newcastle Falcons	2	8,241	4,121	4,257	3,984	40%
(Wales) Newport-Gwent Dragons	2	7,285	3,643	3,746	3,539	43%
(England) Northampton Saints	2	27,188	13,594	14,011	13,177	88%
(Wales) Ospreys	2	6,479	3,240	3,352	3,127	56%
(England) Sale Sharks	2	10,166	5,083	6,668	3,498	42%
(England) Saracens	3	21,288	7,096	8,734	4,747	71%
(Wales) Scarlets	2	7,334	3,667	3,796	3,538	25%
(England) Wasps	2	23,416	11,708	12,007	11,409	36%
(England) Worcester Warriors	2	13,445	6,723	7,114	6,331	56%

== Individual statistics ==
- Note that points scorers includes tries as well as conversions, penalties and drop goals. Appearance figures also include coming on as substitutes (unused substitutes not included).

=== Top points scorers ===
Rank	Player	Team	Apps	Points
1	(England) Freddie Burns	Leicester Tigers	5	64
2	(England) Joe Simmonds	Exeter Chiefs	6	43
3	(England) Tom Whiteley	Saracens	4	39
4	(England) Sam Olver	Northampton Saints	3	33
5	(Wales) Dan Jones	Scarlets	2	30
5	(Wales) Josh Adams	Worcester Warriors	3	30
6	(Wales) Luke Price	Ospreys	3	28
7	(England) Billy Searle	Bristol	3	22
8	(Italy) Michele Campagnaro	Exeter Chiefs	2	20
8	(England) Ryan Mills	Worcester Warriors	2	20

=== Top try scorers ===
Rank	Player	Team	Apps	Tries
1	(Wales) Josh Adams	Worcester Warriors	3	6
2	(Italy) Michele Campagnaro	Exeter Chiefs	2	4
2	(South Africa) Shaun Malton	Exeter Chiefs	6	4
3	(South Africa) Wynand Olivier	Worcester Warriors	2	3
3	(England) Jacob Umaga	Wasps	3	3
4	(Wales) Luke Hamilton	Leicester Tigers	4	3
4	(Ireland) Brendan Macken	Wasps	4	3
5	(England) Nick Tompkins	Saracens	5	3
5	(England) Tom Whiteley	Saracens	5	3

== Season records ==
=== Team ===
Largest home win — 52 points

62-10 Wasps at home to Worcester Warriors on 13 November 2016

Largest away win — 24 points

31-6 Ospreys away to Cardiff Blues on 18 November 2016

Most points scored — 62 points (x2)

62-25 Exeter Chiefs at home to Cardiff Blues on 13 November 2016
62-10 Wasps at home to Worcester Warriors on 13 November 2016

Most tries in a match — 10 (x2)

Exeter Chiefs at home to Cardiff Blues on 13 November 2016
Wasps at home to Worcester Warriors on 13 November 2016

Most conversions in a match — 6 (x3)

Exeter Chiefs at home to Cardiff Blues on 13 November 2016
Wasps at home to Worcester Warriors on 13 November 2016
Exeter Chiefs at home to Wasps on 28 January 2017

Most penalties in a match — 4 (x2)

Harlequins at home to Exeter Chiefs on 5 November 2016
Northampton Saints away to Newcastle Falcons on 6 November 2016
Bath at home to Gloucester on 27 January 2017

Most drop goals in a match — 1

Northampton Saints away to Newcastle Falcons on 6 November 2016

=== Player ===
Most points in a match — 17

(England) Joe Simmonds for Exeter Chiefs at home to Cardiff Blues on 13 November 2016

Most tries in a match — 3

(Italy) Michele Campagnaro for Exeter Chiefs at home to Wasps on 28 January 2017

Most conversions in a match — 6 (x2)

(England) Joe Simmonds for Exeter Chiefs at home to Cardiff Blues on 13 November 2016
(England) Joe Simmonds for Exeter Chiefs at home to Wasps on 28 January 2017

Most penalties in a match — 4 (x3)

(New Zealand) Nick Evans for Harlequins at home to Exeter Chiefs on 5 November 2016
(England) Sam Olver for Northampton Saints away to Newcastle Falcons on 6 November 2016
(Wales) Rhys Priestland for Bath at home to Gloucester on 27 January 2017

Most drop goals in a match — 1

(England) Sam Olver for Northampton Saints away to Newcastle Falcons on 6 November 2016

=== Attendances ===
Highest — 25,849

Leicester Tigers at home to Northampton Saints on 28 January 2017

Lowest — 1,370

Cardiff Blues at home to Worcester Warriors on 4 February 2017

Highest Average Attendance — 22,300

Leicester Tigers

Lowest Average Attendance — 2,732

Cardiff Blues
