= 2019–20 Premiership Rugby Cup =

Tournament details
- Countries: England
- Tournament format(s): Round-robin and knockout
- Date: 20 September 2019 – 21 September 2020

Tournament statistics
- Teams: 12
- Matches played: 26
- Attendance: 229,032 (8,809 per match)
- Highest attendance: 16,160; Leicester Tigers v Northampton Saints; 12 October 2019
- Lowest attendance: 2,558; London Irish v Sale Sharks; 12 October 2019
- Tries scored: 195 (7.5 per match)
- Top point scorer(s): (England) Marcus Smith (Harlequins); 40 points
- Top try scorer(s): (England) Rotimi Segun (Saracens); 5 tries

Final
- Venue: AJ Bell Stadium
- Champions: Sale Sharks (1st title)
- Runners-up: Harlequins

The 2019–20 Premiership Rugby Cup was the 48th season of England's national rugby union cup competition and the second under the new Premiership Rugby Cup format following the disbanding of the Anglo-Welsh Cup at the end of the 2017–18 season due to the withdrawal of the Welsh Pro14 regions. Although there were no stipulations on player selection, the cup was seen by many clubs as a development competition, and games took place during the 2019 Rugby World Cup and during the Six Nations.

Northampton Saints entered the competition as reigning champions, becoming the first winners of the Premiership Cup when they defeated Saracens 23 – 9 in the final at Franklin's Gardens during the 2019–20 season.

== Competition format ==
The competition consisted of the twelve Premiership Rugby teams arranged in three pools of four clubs each, with each team playing three games against teams in their pool, as well as a 'derby' game against a team in another pool. The top team in each pool, plus the best overall runner up, progressed to the semi-finals, with the highest ranked teams having home advantage. The winners of the semi-finals then met in the final delayed from March to September 2020, held at the home ground of the highest ranked remaining team.

== Teams and locations ==
2019–20 Premiership Rugby Cup teams

Club	Director of Rugby/Head Coach	Captain	Kit supplier	Stadium	Capacity	City/Area
Bath	(England) Stuart Hooper	(England) Matt Garvey	Canterbury	The Recreation Ground	14,509	Bath
Bristol Bears	(Samoa) Pat Lam	(New Zealand) Steve Luatua	Bristol Sport	Ashton Gate	27,000	Bristol
Exeter Chiefs	(England) Rob Baxter	(England) Jack Yeandle	Samurai Sportswear	Sandy Park	13,593 (Note: Sandy Park's capacity increased from 12,921 to 13,593 from December 2019 onward.)	Exeter
Gloucester	(Ireland) David Humphreys	(New Zealand) Willi Heinz	Elite Pro Sports	Kingsholm Stadium	16,115	Gloucester
Harlequins	(England) Paul Gustard (Australia) Billy Millard	(England) Chris Robshaw	Adidas	Twickenham Stoop	14,800	Twickenham, Greater London
Leicester Tigers	(Ireland) Geordan Murphy	(England) Tom Youngs	Kukri	Welford Road	25,849	Leicester
London Irish	(Ireland) Declan Kidney	(Scotland) Blair Cowan (England) Stephen Myler (Australia) Dave Porecki (South Africa) Franco van der Merwe	BLK	Madejski Stadium	24,162	Reading, Berkshire
Northampton Saints	(New Zealand) Chris Boyd	(England) Dylan Hartley (England) Alex Waller	Macron	Franklin's Gardens	15,200	Northampton
Sale Sharks	(England) Steve Diamond	(South Africa) Jono Ross	Samurai Sportswear	AJ Bell Stadium	12,000	Salford, Greater Manchester
Saracens	(Ireland) Mark McCall	(England) Brad Barritt	Nike	Allianz Park	7,500 (Note: Allianz Park will have a reduced capacity this season due to redevelopment works.)	Barnet, Greater London
Wasps	(Wales) Dai Young to 11 February (England) Lee Blackett from 11 February	(England) Joe Launchbury	Under Armour	Ricoh Arena	32,609	Coventry
Worcester Warriors	(South Africa) Alan Solomons	(South Africa) GJ van Velze	VX-3	Sixways Stadium	11,499	Worcester

== Pool stage ==
The pool stage began on 20 September 2019 and ran for four consecutive weeks. Fixtures were announced by Premiership Rugby on 17 July 2019.

=== Pool 1 ===
Pool 1
	Club	Played	Won	Drawn	Lost	Points For	Points Against	Points Difference	Tries For	Tries Against	Try Bonus	Losing Bonus	Points
1	Sale Sharks	4	4	0	0	126	77	49	18	9	3	0	19
2	Saracens	4	3	0	1	149	113	36	18	15	2	0	14
3	Wasps	4	2	0	2	123	112	11	17	14	3	1	12
4	Northampton Saints	4	1	0	3	109	151	-42	15	23	3	1	8
If teams are level at any stage, tiebreakers are applied in the following order: 1. Number of matches won 2. Difference between points for and against 3. Total number of points for 4. Total number of tries scored
Green background means the club qualified for the semi-finals as pool winner. Blue background means the club qualified for the semi-finals as the best pool runner up. Updated: 12 October 2019; Note that each team played 4 games; 3 pool games plus a derby game against a team in another pool. Source: "Premiership Rugby Cup 2019-20". Premiership Rugby.

==== Round 1 ====
21 September 2019
13:00

(1 BP) Wasps	28 – 50	Saracens (1 BP)
Try: Brookes 20' c Reider 37' c Flament 45' c Sirker 73' c Con: Umaga (4/4) 21', 39', 46', 74'	Report	Try: Vunipola 2' c Segun (2) 7' m, 64' m Obatoyinbo 33' c Watson 70' c Tompkins 77' c Con: Whiteley (2/4) 3', 34'; Willemse (2/2) 70', 78'; Pen: Whiteley (4) 21', 41', 49', 61'

Ricoh Arena
Attendance: 6,341
Referee: Jack Makepeace

21 September 2019
15:00

(1 BP) Sale Sharks	39 – 18	Northampton Saints
Try: Hammersley (2) 5' m, 66' m Penalty Try 27'; Van Rensburg 41' m Ashton (2) 52' c, 63' c Con: R. Du Preez (2/5) 53', 64'; Pen: R. Du Preez 11'	Report	Try: Harrison 36' m Coles 73' c Con: Grayson (0/1); Matthews (1/1) 74'; Pen: Grayson (2) 18', 61'

AJ Bell Stadium
Attendance: 5,744
Referee: Andrew Jackson

==== Round 2 ====
28 September 2019
15:00

(2 BP) Northampton Saints	32 – 36	Wasps (1 BP)
Try: Fish 12' m Naiyaravoro 16' m Eadie 43' c Penalty Try 64'; Dingwall 70'; Con: Grayson (1/4) 44'; Pen: Grayson 22'	Report	Try: Umaga 8' c Cardall 40' m Vailanu 41' m Carr 56' m Willis 68' c Penalty Try 74'; Con: Umaga (1/4) 9'; Miller (1/1) 69'

Franklin's Gardens
Attendance: 12,000
Referee: Michael Hudson

28 September 2019
15:00

Saracens	17 – 36	Sale Sharks (1 BP)
Try: Whiteley 9' c Lewington 56' c Con: Whiteley (2/2) 10', 57'; Pen: Whiteley 22'	Report	Try: J. Du Preez 16' m Cooper-Woolley (2) 26' m, 78' c McGuigan 69' c Con: Curtis (2/4) 69', 78'; Pen: Curtis 40'+1

Allianz Park
Attendance: 5,398
Referee: Christophe Ridley

==== Round 3 ====
5 October 2019
15:00

Sale Sharks	24 – 20	Wasps (1 BP)
Try: Van der Merwe 1' c Solomona 58' c, 70' c Con: R. Du Preez (3/3) 3', 59', 72'; Pen: R. Du Preez 19'	Report	Try: Wolstenholme 11' c Willis 30' c Con: Umaga (2/2) 12', 32'; Pen: Umaga (2) 8', 39'

AJ Bell Stadium
Attendance: 6,809
Referee: Adam Leal

6 October 2019
15:00

(1 BP) Northampton Saints	28 – 54	Saracens (1 BP)
Try: Symons (2) 14' c, 35' c Taylor 23' c Ribbans 49' c Con: Grayson (4/4) 14', 24', 36', 50'	Report	Try: Gallagher 7' m Segun 29' m Tompkins (3) 32' c, 60' c, 75' c Spencer 51' c Vunipola 64' c Con: Whiteley (1/3) 34'; Vunipola (4/4) 53', 62', 65', 76'; Pen: Whiteley (3) 17', 40'+3, 41'

Franklin's Gardens
Attendance: 11,631
Referee: Craig Maxwell-Keys

=== Pool 2 ===
Pool 2
	Club	Played	Won	Drawn	Lost	Points For	Points Against	Points Difference	Tries For	Tries Against	Try Bonus	Losing Bonus	Points
1	Harlequins	4	3	0	1	106	89	17	14	12	1	1	14
2	Bristol Bears	4	2	0	2	95	110	-15	12	16	1	0	9
3	London Irish	4	1	0	3	116	121	-5	16	16	2	2	8
4	Gloucester	4	0	0	4	101	135	-34	16	19	3	2	5
If teams are level at any stage, tiebreakers are applied in the following order: 1. Number of matches won 2. Difference between points for and against 3. Total number of points for 4. Total number of tries scored
Green background means the club qualified for the semi-finals as pool winner. Blue background means the club qualified for the semi-finals as the best pool runner up. Updated: 12 October 2019; Note that each team played 4 games; 3 pool games plus a derby game against a team in another pool. Source: "Premiership Rugby Cup 2019-20". Premiership Rugby.

==== Round 1 ====
20 September 2019
19:45

Harlequins	24 – 12	Bristol Bears
Try: Morris (2) 13' c, 35' c Mulchrone 77' c Con: Herron (3/3) 14', 36', 78'; Pen: Herron 3'	Report	Try: Pincus 39' m Protheroe 79' c Con: Eden (1/2) 79'

Twickenham Stoop
Attendance: 9,051
Referee: Ian Tempest

21 September 2019
15:00

(1 BP) Gloucester	29 – 49	London Irish (1 BP)
Try: Evans (2) 20' m, 42' c Hinkley 35' c Rees-Zammit 76' c Con: Evans (2/3) 36', 43'; Barton (1/1) 76'; Pen: Evans 4'	Report	Try: McMillan (2) 25' m, 31' c Nott 27' c Steele (3) 46' c, 60' m, 79' m Gilsenan 65' c Con: Myler (3/4) 28', 33', 48'; Jackson (1/3) 66'; Pen: Myler 11'; Jackson 57'

Kingsholm
Attendance: 11,287
Referee: Anthony Woodthorpe

==== Round 2 ====
27 September 2019
19:45

Bristol Bears	20 – 17	Gloucester (1 BP)
Try: Thacker (2) 4' c, 44' c Con: Sheedy (2/2) 5', 45'; Pen: Sheedy (2) 12', 21'	Report	Try: Simpson 31' m Banahan 59' m Grobler 77' c Con: Evans (1/3) 77'

Ashton Gate
Attendance: 7,274
Referee: Tom Foley

28 September 2019
15:00

(1 BP) London Irish	18 – 21	Harlequins
Try: Hepetema 15' c Fainga'a 28' m Con: Jackson (1/2) 16'; Pen: Jackson (2) 35', 60'	Report	Try: Lang 1' m Ibitoye 54' m Dombrandt 67' m Con: Herron (0/3); Pen: Herron (2) 21', 78'

Madejski Stadium
Attendance: 3,249
Referee: Greg MacDonald

==== Round 3 ====
5 October 2019
15:00

(1 BP) Harlequins	40 – 31	Gloucester (1 BP)
Try: Brown 2' c Landajo 16' c Baldwin 24' c Morris 31' c Tapuai 38' c Bothma 79' m Con: Smith (5/5) 4', 17', 26', 33', 39'; Lang (0/1)	Report	Try: Simpson 12' m Twelvetrees 19' c Hinkley 35' c Seabrook 47' m Grobler 56' c Con: Twelvetrees (3/5) 20', 36', 57'

Twickenham Stoop
Attendance: 12,496
Referee: Fergus Kirby

6 October 2019
15:00

(1 BP) Bristol Bears	44 – 27	London Irish (1 BP)
Try: Thacker 26' c Hughes 28' c Uren 42' c Protheroe (2) 73' c, 76' c Con: Eden (5/5) 27', 29', 42', 74', 78'; Pen: Eden (3) 12', 50', 69'	Report	Try: Englefield 20' m Loader (2) 55' c, 64' c Cooke 80'+1 m Con: Myler (2/4) 56', 65'; Pen: Myler 1'

Ashton Gate
Attendance: 4,865
Referee: Michael Hudson

=== Pool 3 ===
Pool 3
	Club	Played	Won	Drawn	Lost	Points For	Points Against	Points Difference	Tries For	Tries Against	Try Bonus	Losing Bonus	Points
1	Exeter Chiefs	4	3	0	1	111	79	32	15	12	3	0	15
2	Leicester Tigers	4	2	0	2	90	102	-12	12	14	2	0	10
3	Bath	4	2	0	2	83	98	-15	12	14	2	0	10
4	Worcester Warriors	4	1	0	3	110	132	-22	15	16	2	0	6
If teams are level at any stage, tiebreakers are applied in the following order: 1. Number of matches won 2. Difference between points for and against 3. Total number of points for 4. Total number of tries scored
Green background means the club qualified for the semi-finals as pool winner. Blue background means the club qualified for the semi-finals as the best pool runner up. Updated: 12 October 2019; Note that each team played 4 games; 3 pool games plus a derby game against a team in another pool. Source: "Premiership Rugby Cup 2019-20". Premiership Rugby.

==== Round 1 ====
21 September 2019
15:00

(1 BP) Worcester Warriors	57 – 23	Leicester Tigers
Try: Humphreys 11' c Miller 20' c Montgomery 32' c Hearle 39' c Beck 45' m Mudariki 59' c Penalty Try 74'; Shillcock 76' c Con: Lance (4/5) 12', 21', 33', 40'+1; Van Breda (2/2) 61', 77'; Pen: Lance 6'	Report	Try: Forsyth 15' c McPhillips 80' c Con: Hardwick (2/2) 16', 80'; Pen: Hardwick (3) 2', 10', 43'

Sixways
Attendance: 6,037
Referee: Christophe Ridley

21 September 2019
15:00

(1 BP) Exeter Chiefs	28 – 14	Bath
Try: Wyatt 20' c Hendrickson 30' c Woodburn 37' c Karea 73' c Con: Steenson (4/4) 20', 30', 37', 73'	Report	Try: Davis 48' c Cook 64' c Con: A Davies (2/2) 48, 62

Sandy Park
Attendance: 9,722
Referee: Adam Leal

==== Round 2 ====
27 September 2019
19:45

(1 BP) Leicester Tigers	27 – 7	Exeter Chiefs
Try: Thompson 2' m Olowofela 15' m Holmes 25' c Eastmond 73' c Con: Reid (1/3) 26'; Hardwick (1/1) 74'; Pen: Reid 47'	Report	Try: Vermeulen 8' c Con: Skinner (1/1) 9'

Welford Road
Attendance: 13,633
Referee: Jack Makepeace

28 September 2019
15:00

(1 BP) Bath	36 – 28	Worcester Warriors (1 BP)
Try: Chudley 8' c Davis 16' c Stooke 28' c Penalty Try 67'; Brew 77' m Con: Priestland (3/3) 8', 17', 29'; Burns (0/1); Pen: Priestland 5'	Report	Try: Mama 36' c Lawrence 61' c Hill 79' c Hougaard 80'+2 c Con: Weir (2/2) 38', 61'; Shillcock (2/2) 79', 80'+3

Recreation Ground
Attendance: 12,666
Referee: Simon Harding

==== Round 3 ====
4 October 2019
19:45

Worcester Warriors	19 – 34	Exeter Chiefs (1 BP)
Try: Howe (3) 2' m, 27' c, 46' c Con: Lance (2/3) (28) (47)	Report	Try: Woodburn 16' c Vermeulen 62' c Lonsdale 76' c Kvesic 80'+1 c Con: Simmonds (4/4) 18', 64', 77', 80'+3; Pen: Simmonds (2) 44', 58'

Sixways
Attendance: 6,743
Referee: JP Doyle

5 October 2019
15:00

Bath	7 – 18	Leicester Tigers
Try: Davis 44' c Con: Priestland (1/1) 45'	Report	Try: Reffell 17' m White 26' c Con: Hardwick (1/2) 27'; Pen: Hardwick 13'; Drop: Hardwick 79'

Recreation Ground
Attendance: 13,190
Referee: Andrew Jackson

=== Round 4 (derby games) ===
After three pool games, each team played a 'derby' game against a team in another pool, with results counting towards the final standings in each pool.

11 October 2019
19:45

(2 BP) Gloucester (P2)	24 – 26	Bath (P3) (1 BP)
Try: Rees-Zammit 4' c Kriel 12' m Chapman 17' c Morris (20); Con: Evans (2/4) 5', 18'	Report	Try: Batty 33' c Stuart 40' m Burns 53' c Walker 62' c Con: A Davies (1/2) 34'; Burns (2/2) 53', 63'

Kingsholm
Attendance: 13,197
Referee: Ian Tempest

12 October 2019
15:00

(1 BP) Exeter Chiefs (P3)	42 – 19	Bristol Bears (P2)
Try: Hill 1' c Maunder 10' c Simmonds 18' c Williams 31' c Dennis 59' c Street 76' c Con: Simmonds (5/5) 2', 11', 19', 31', 60'; Steenson (1/1) 78'	Report	Try: Bates 5'; Pincus (2) 22', 65'; Con: Madigan (2/3) 24', 66'

Sandy Park
Attendance: 9,706
Referee: Craig Maxwell-Keys

12 October 2019
15:00

(1 BP) Leicester Tigers (P3)	22 – 33	Northampton Saints (P1) (1 BP)
Try: Holmes (2) 18' m, 27' m Spencer 47' m Reid 50' c Con: Reid (1/4) 51'	Report	Try: Ribbans (2) 8' c, 32' c Collins 62' c Dingwall 65' c Con: Grayson (4/4) 8', 33', 62', 66'; Pen: Grayson 74'

Welford Road
Attendance: 16,160
Referee: Christophe Ridley

12 October 2019
15:00

(1 BP) London Irish (P2)	22 – 27	Sale Sharks (P1) (1 BP)
Try: Fainga'a 7' c Hoskins 43' c Loader 55' m Con: Jackson (2/3) 8', 44'; Pen: Jackson 38'	Report	Try: Hammersley 18' m Ashton (2) 32' c, 62' c Van der Merwe 73' m Con: R. Du Preez (2/4) 33', 63'; Pen: R. Du Preez 40'

Madejski Stadium
Attendance: 2,558
Referee: Simon Harding

12 October 2019
15:00

Saracens (P1)	28 – 21	Harlequins (P2) (1 BP)
Try: Segun 6' m Spencer (2) 14' c, 33' c Con: Spencer (2/3) 15', 34'; Pen: Spencer (3) 22', 64', 71'	Report	Try: Brown 29' c Ibitoye 75' m Con: Smith (1/2) 30'; Pen: Smith (3) 3', 40', 53'

Allianz Park
Attendance: 5,761
Referee: Anthony Woodthorpe

12 October 2019
15:00

(1 BP) Wasps (P1)	39 – 6	Worcester Warriors (P3)
Try: Cruse 1' m Watson (3) 45' c, 62' c, 66' c Bassett 77' c Con: Searle (1/2) 46'; Sopoaga (3/3) 64', 67', 78'; Pen: Searle (2) 40', 43'	Report	Pen: Weir (2) 17', 48'

Ricoh Arena
Attendance: 6,104
Referee: Thomas Foley

== Knock-out stage ==
The four qualifiers were seeded according to performance in the pool stage. The top 2 seeds hosted the semi-finals against the lower seeds, in a 1 v 4, 2v 3 format. Note, if two teams qualified from the same pool, they could still be drawn together in the semi-finals. Semi-finals were held over a two-week period in early February followed by the final originally scheduled for mid-March but postponed to September due to the COVID-19 pandemic.

Teams are ranked by:

1 – competition points (4 for a win, 2 for a draw)
2 – where competition points are equal, greatest number of wins
3 – where the number of wins are equal, aggregate points difference
4 – where the aggregate points difference are equal, greatest number of points scored
5 – where the greatest number of points are equal, greatest number of tries scored

Rank	Pool leaders	Pts	Wins	Diff	PF	TF
1	Sale Sharks	19	4	49	126	18
2	Exeter Chiefs	15	3	32	111	15
3	Harlequins	14	3	17	106	14
Rank	Pool runners–up	Pts	Wins	Diff	PF	TF
4	Saracens	14	3	36	149	18
5	Leicester Tigers	10	2	-12	90	12
6	Bristol Bears	9	2	-15	95	12

Semi-finals
2 February 2020 — Sandy Park
Exeter Chiefs	22
Harlequins	49
7 February 2020 — AJ Bell Stadium
Sale Sharks	28
Saracens	7

Final
21 September 2020 — AJ Bell Stadium
Sale Sharks	27
Harlequins	19

=== Semi-finals ===
2 February 2020
13:00

Exeter Chiefs	22 – 49	Harlequins
Try: Skinner 34' m Price (2) 46' c, 79 m Short 69' m Con: Skinner (1/2) 47'	Report	Try: Dombrandt (2) 21' m, 59' c Ibitoye (2) 30' c, 63' m Young 51' c Chisholm 66' c Smith 71' m Con: Smith (4/7) 31', 52', 61', 66'; Pen: Smith (2) 13', 39'

Sandy Park
Attendance: 9,418
Referee: Anthony Woodthorpe

7 February 2020
19:45

Sale Sharks	28 – 7	Saracens
Try: Solomona 1' c Cliff 14' c Curry 17' c Van der Merwe 64' c Con: R. Du Preez (4/4) 2', 15', 19', 65'	Report	Try: Segun 58' c Con: Whiteley (1/1) 59'

AJ Bell Stadium
Attendance: 7,992
Referee: Hamish Smales

=== Final ===
21 September 2020 (Note: Originally scheduled for 15 March 2020 but postponed due to a Harlequins staff member testing positive for COVID-19.)
19:45

Sale Sharks	27–19	Harlequins

AJ Bell Stadium
Attendance: 0 (Note: Match played behind closed doors due to the COVID-19 pandemic.)

Sale Sharks
Harlequins

FB	15	(England) Simon Hammersly
RW	14	(England) Denny Solomona
OC	13	(England) Sam James
IC	12	(South Africa) Rohan Janse van Rensburg
LW	11	(England) Marland Yarde
FH	10	(South Africa) Rob du Preez
SH	9	(England) Will Cliff
N8	8	(South Africa) Dan du Preez
OF	7	(England) Ben Curry
BF	6	(South Africa) Jono Ross (c)
RL	5	(South Africa) Jean-Luc du Preez
LL	4	(South Africa) Cobus Wiese
TP	3	(England) Jake Cooper-Woolley
HK	2	(England) Curtis Langdon
LP	1	(South Africa) Coenie Oosthuizen
Substitutions:
HK	16	(South Africa) Akker van der Merwe
PR	17	(Russia) Valery Morozov
PR	18	(Wales) WillGriff John
LK	19	(England) James Phillips
FL	20	(England) Tom Curry
SH	21	(South Africa) Faf de Klerk
FH	22	(United States) AJ MacGinty
CE	23	(England) Manu Tuilagi
Coach:
(England) Steve Diamond

FB	15	(England) Mike Brown
RW	14	(England) Nathan Earle
OC	13	(England) Joe Marchant
IC	12	(England) Luke Northmore
LW	11	(England) Aaron Morris
FH	10	(England) Marcus Smith
SH	9	(England) Danny Care
N8	8	(England) James Chisholm
OF	7	(England) Will Evans
BF	6	(England) Chris Robshaw (c)
RL	5	(South Africa) Stephan Lewies
LL	4	(England) Dino Lamb
TP	3	(South Africa) Simon Kerrod
HK	2	(Wales) Scott Baldwin
LP	1	(Argentina) Santiago García Botta
Substitutions:
HK	16	(Samoa) Elia Elia
PR	17	(Wales) Marc Thomas
PR	18	(South Africa) Wilco Louw
LK	19	(Scotland) Glen Young
FL	20	(England) Alex Dombrandt
SH	21	(Argentina) Martin Landajo
CE	22	(South Africa) Andre Esterhuizen
CE	23	(Scotland) James Lang
Coach:
(Australia) Billy Millard

== Attendances ==
Club	Home matches	Total	Average	Highest	Lowest	% Capacity
Bath	2	25,856	12,928	13,190	12,666	89%
Bristol Bears	2	12,139	6,070	7,274	4,865	22%
Exeter Chiefs	3	28,846	9,615	9,722	9,418	73%
Gloucester	2	24,484	12,242	13,197	11,287	76%
Harlequins	2	21,547	10,774	12,496	9,051	73%
Leicester Tigers	2	29,793	14,897	16,160	13,633	58%
London Irish	2	5,807	2,904	3,249	2,558	12%
Northampton Saints	2	23,631	11,816	12,000	11,631	77%
Sale Sharks	3	20,545	6,848	7,992	5,744	57%
Saracens	2	11,159	5,580	5,761	5,398	66%
Wasps	2	12,445	6,223	6,341	6,104	19%
Worcester Warriors	2	12,780	6,390	6,743	6,037	56%

== Individual statistics ==
- Points scorers includes tries as well as conversions, penalties and drop goals. Appearance figures also include coming on as substitutes (unused substitutes not included).

=== Top points scorers ===
Rank	Player	Team	Appearances	Points
1	(England) Tom Whiteley	Saracens	5	41
2	(England) Marcus Smith	Harlequins	3	40
3	(South Africa) Robert du Preez	Sale Sharks	4	31
4	(England) James Grayson	Northampton Saints	4	30
5	(England) Ben Spencer	Saracens	2	28
6	(England) Jacob Umaga	Wasps	3	25
6	(England) Rotimi Segun	Saracens	5	25
7	(England) Joe Simmonds	Exeter Chiefs	2	24
8	(England) Lloyd Evans	Gloucester	3	23
8	(England) Tom Hardwick	Leicester Tigers	4	23

=== Top try scorers ===
Rank	Player	Team	Appearances	Tries
1	(England) Rotimi Segun	Saracens	5	5
2	(England) Chris Ashton	Sale Sharks	3	4
2	(England) Nick Tompkins	Saracens	3	4
2	(England) Gabriel Ibitoye	Harlequins	4	4
3	(Australia) Tom Pincus	Bristol Bears	2	3
3	(England) Mat Protheroe	Bristol Bears	2	3
3	(England) Harry Thacker	Bristol Bears	2	3
3	(England) Levi Davis	Bath	3	3
3	(England) Tom Howe	Worcester Warriors	3	3
3	(Wales) Jonah Holmes	Leicester Tigers	3	3
3	(South Africa) David Ribbans	Northampton Saints	3	3
3	(England) Ben Spencer	Saracens	3	3
3	(England) Marcus Watson	Wasps	3	3
3	(England) Alex Dombrandt	Harlequins	4	3
3	(England) Simon Hammersley	Sale Sharks	4	3
3	(England) Ben Loader	London Irish	4	3
3	(South Africa) Akker van der Merwe	Sale Sharks	4	3
3	(England) Aaron Morris	Harlequins	4	3
3	(England) Denny Solomona	Sale Sharks	4	3
3	(Scotland) Scott Steele	London Irish	4	3

== Season records ==
=== Team ===
Largest home win — 34 points

57 – 23 Worcester Warriors at home to Leicester Tigers on 21 September 2019

Largest away win — 27 points

49 – 22 Harlequins away to Exeter Chiefs on 31 January 2020

Most points scored — 57

57 – 23 Worcester Warriors at home to Leicester Tigers on 21 September 2019

Most tries in a match — 8

Worcester Warriors at home to Leicester Tigers on 21 September 2019

Most conversions in a match — 6 (2)

Worcester Warriors at home to Leicester Tigers on 21 September 2019
Exeter Chiefs at home to Bristol Bears on 12 October 2019

Most penalties in a match — 4

Saracens away to Wasps on 21 September 2019

Most drop goals in a match — 1

Leicester Tigers away to Bath on 5 October 2019

=== Player ===
Most points in a match — 23

(England) Ben Spencer for Saracens at home to Harlequins on 12 October 2019

Most tries in a match — 3 (4)

(Scotland) Scott Steele for London Irish away to Gloucester on 21 September 2019
(England) Tom Howe for Worcester Warriors at home to Exeter Chiefs on 4 October 2019
(England) Nick Tompkins for Saracens away to Northampton Saints on 6 October 2019
(England) Marcus Watson for Wasps at home to Worcester Warriors on 12 October 2019

Most conversions in a match — 5 (3)

(England) Marcus Smith for Harlequins at home to Gloucester on 5 October 2019
(England) Tiff Eden for Bristol Bears at home to London Irish on 6 October 2019
(England) Joe Simmonds for Exeter Chiefs at home to Bristol Bears on 12 October 2019

Most penalties in a match — 4

(England) Tom Whiteley for Saracens away to Wasps on 21 September 2019

Most drop goals in a match — 1

(England) Tom Hardwick for Leicester Tigers away to Bath on 5 October 2019

=== Attendances ===
Highest — 16,160

Leicester Tigers at home to Northampton Saints on 12 October 2019

Lowest — 2,558

London Irish at home to Sale Sharks on 12 October 2019

== See also ==
- 2019–20 Premiership Rugby
- Anglo-Welsh Cup
- 2019–20 RFU Championship Cup
- English rugby union system
- List of English rugby union teams
- Rugby union in England
