= 2018–19 Premiership Rugby Cup =

English rugby union tournament

Tournament details
- Countries: England
- Tournament format(s): Round-robin and knockout
- Date: 26 October 2018 – 17 March 2019

Tournament statistics
- Teams: 12
- Matches played: 27
- Attendance: 262,302 (9,715 per match)
- Highest attendance: 17,815; Leicester v Worcester; 3 November 2018
- Lowest attendance: 3,824; Sale v Newcastle; 3 February 2019
- Tries scored: 157 (5.81 per match)
- Top point scorer(s): James Grayson (Northampton); 62 points
- Top try scorer(s): Zach Kibirige (Newcastle); 5 tries

Final
- Champions: Northampton Saints (1st title)
- Runners-up: Saracens

The 2018–19 Premiership Rugby Cup was the 47th season of England's national rugby union cup competition and the first under the new Premiership Rugby Cup format following the disbanding of the Anglo-Welsh Cup at the end of the 2017–18 season due to the withdrawal of the Welsh Pro14 regions. Although there are no stipulations on player selection, the cup was seen by many clubs as a development competition, and games took place during the Autumn International window and during the Six Nations.

Northampton Saints became the first ever winners of the Premiership Cup when they defeated Saracens 23 – 9 in the final at Franklin's Gardens on 17 March 2019. It was the Saints' first domestic cup triumph since winning the 2009–10 LV Cup and their second overall.

== Competition format ==
The competition consists of the twelve English Premiership teams arranged in three pools of four clubs each, with each team playing three games against teams in their pool, as well as a 'derby' game against a team in another group. The top team in each pool, plus the best overall runner up, progress to the semi-finals, with the highest ranked teams having home advantage. The winners of the semi-finals then meet at the final in March 2019 to be held at the home ground of the highest ranked remaining team.

== Teams and locations ==
2018–19 Premiership Rugby Cup teams

Club	Director of Rugby/Head Coach	Captain	Kit supplier	Stadium	Capacity	City/Area
Bath	(New Zealand) Todd Blackadder	(England) Matt Garvey	Canterbury	The Recreation Ground	14,500	Bath
Bristol Bears	(Samoa) Pat Lam	N/A (Leadership Group)	Bristol Sport	Ashton Gate	27,000	Bristol
Exeter Chiefs	(England) Rob Baxter	(England) Jack Yeandle	Samurai Sportswear	Sandy Park	12,800	Exeter
Gloucester	(Ireland) David Humphreys	(New Zealand) Willi Heinz	XBlades	Kingsholm Stadium	16,115	Gloucester
Harlequins	(England) Paul Gustard (Australia) Billy Millard	(Australia) James Horwill (England) Chris Robshaw	Adidas	Twickenham Stoop	14,800	Twickenham, Greater London
Leicester Tigers	(Ireland) Geordan Murphy (interim)	(England) Tom Youngs	Kukri	Welford Road	25,849	Leicester
Newcastle Falcons	(England) Dean Richards	(England) Will Welch	ISC	Kingston Park	10,200	Newcastle upon Tyne
Northampton Saints	(New Zealand) Chris Boyd	(England) Dylan Hartley (England) Alex Waller	Macron	Franklin's Gardens	15,249	Northampton
Sale Sharks	(England) Steve Diamond	(South Africa) Jono Ross	Samurai Sportswear	AJ Bell Stadium	12,000	Salford, Greater Manchester
Saracens	(Ireland) Mark McCall	(England) Brad Barritt	Nike	Allianz Park	10,000 (Note: Allianz Park typically has a capacity of 10,000 but this can be raised to 15,000 with temporary seating.)	Barnet, Greater London
Wasps	(Wales) Dai Young	(England) Joe Launchbury	Under Armour	Ricoh Arena	32,609	Coventry
Worcester Warriors	(South Africa) Alan Solomons	(South Africa) GJ van Velze	VX3	Sixways Stadium	11,499	Worcester

== Pool stage ==
=== Pool 1 ===
Pool 1
	Club	Played	Won	Drawn	Lost	Points For	Points Against	Points Difference	Tries For	Tries Against	Try Bonus	Losing Bonus	Points
1	Newcastle Falcons	4	3	1	0	95	62	33	12	8	1	0	15
2	Exeter Chiefs	4	3	1	0	88	63	25	13	8	1	0	15
3	Bath	4	1	0	3	96	74	22	14	8	1	1	6
4	Harlequins	4	1	0	3	73	103	-30	7	14	0	1	5
If teams are level at any stage, tiebreakers are applied in the following order: 1. Number of matches won 2. Difference between points for and against 3. Total number of points for 4. Total number of tries scored
Green background means the club has qualified for the semi-finals as pool winner. Blue background means the club has qualified for the semi-finals as the best pool runner up. Updated: 2 February 2019; Note that each team plays 4 games; 3 pool games plus a derby game against a team in another pool. Source: "Premiership Rugby Cup 2018-19". Premiership Rugby.

==== Round 1 ====
27 October 2018
15:00

Bath	19 – 27	Harlequins
Try: J. Walker 13' m Batty (2) 65' c, 72' c Con: Davies (2/3) 66', 73'	Report	Try: C. Walker 39' m Dombrandt 43' c Con: Catrakilis (1/2) 44' c Pen: Catrakilis (4) 17', 23', 56', 69'; Lang 75'

Recreation Ground
Attendance: 14,509
Referee: Greg Macdonald

28 October 2018
15:00

Newcastle Falcons	22 – 22	Exeter Chiefs
Try: Kibirige (3) 25' c, 33' m, 57' c Con: Connon (2/3) 26', 58'; Pen: Connon 48'	Report	Try: Bodilly (2) 19' c, 68' c Short 62' m Con: Skinner (2/3) 21', 70'; Pen: Skinner 55'

Kingston Park
Attendance: 6,502
Referee: Andrew Jackson

==== Round 2 ====
3 November 2018
13:00

Exeter Chiefs	25 – 18	Bath (1 BP)
Try: Short 15' m Devoto 32' c O'Flaherty 51' c Con: J. Simmonds (2/3) 33', 52'; Pen: J. Simmonds 46'; Skinner 77'	Report	Try: Batty 38' m Wilson (2) 55' m, 74' m Con: Davies (0/2); Atkins (0/1); Pen: Davies 4'

Sandy Park
Attendance: 12,693
Referee: Dean Richards

4 November 2018
15:00

(1 BP) Harlequins	21 – 23	Newcastle Falcons
Try: Boyce 55' m Dombrandt 60' c Con: Catrakilis (1/2) 61'; Pen: Catrakilis (3) 10', 20', 48'	Report	Try: Bettencourt 31' c Stevenson 50' c Con: Connon (2/2) 32', 50'; Pen: Connon (2) 13', 30'; Swiel 71'

Twickenham Stoop
Attendance: 8,027
Referee: Mike Hudson

==== Round 3 ====
9 November 2018
19:45

Newcastle Falcons	22 – 7	Bath
Try: Young 18' c Hammersley 43' c Sinoti 65' m Con: Hodgson (2/3) 20', 44'; Pen: Hodgson 26'	Report	Try: Bayliss 75' c Con: Davies 76'

Kingston Park
Attendance: 5,425
Referee: Anthony Woodthorpe

10 November 2018
13:00

(1 BP) Exeter Chiefs	29 – 13	Harlequins
Try: Capstick 27' c Keast 32' m O'Flaherty 34' m Lawday 40' m J. Simmonds 57' c Con: J. Simmonds (2/5) 27', 57'	Report	Try: Ward 79' c Con: Smith (1/1) 79'; Pen: Smith (2) 2', 38'

Sandy Park
Attendance: 11,927
Referee: Craig Maxwell-Keys

=== Pool 2 ===
Pool 2
	Club	Played	Won	Drawn	Lost	Points For	Points Against	Points Difference	Tries For	Tries Against	Try Bonus	Losing Bonus	Points
1	Worcester Warriors	4	3	0	1	123	72	51	18	11	4	0	16
2	Saracens	4	3	1	0	110	70	40	15	10	2	0	16
3	Sale Sharks	4	1	1	2	48	94	-46	6	12	0	0	6
4	Leicester Tigers	4	0	0	4	69	125	-56	7	17	0	1	1
If teams are level at any stage, tiebreakers are applied in the following order: 1. Number of matches won 2. Difference between points for and against 3. Total number of points for 4. Total number of tries scored
Green background means the club has qualified for the semi-finals as pool winner. Blue background means the club has qualified for the semi-finals as the best pool runner up. Updated: 2 February 2019; Note that each team plays 4 games; 3 pool games plus a derby game against a team in another pool. Source: "Premiership Rugby Cup 2018-19". Premiership Rugby.

==== Round 1 ====
26 October 2018
19:45

(1 BP) Worcester Warriors	35 – 3	Sale Sharks
Try: Adams 4' c Hougaard 26' c Venter 31' c Phillips 53' c Williams '76' c Con: Wier (4/4) 5', 27', 32', 55'; Shillcock (1/1) 77'	Report	Pen: Wilkinson 15'

Sixways Stadium
Attendance: 6,606
Referee: Adam Leal

27 October 2018
15:00

Saracens	29 – 21	Leicester Tigers
Try: Burger 7' m Vailanu (2) 39' m, 46' c Con: Malins (1/3) 47'; Pen: Malins (4) 21', 52', 57', 66'	Report	Try: Feao 62' c Wells 70' m Con: J. Ford (1/2) 62'; Pen: J. Ford (3) 2', 6', 30'

Allianz Park
Attendance: 7,194
Referee: Christophe Ridley

==== Round 2 ====
2 November 2018
20:00

Sale Sharks	15 – 15	Saracens
Try: Odogwu 36' c Cliff 57' m Con: Cliff (1/2); Pen: Cliff 4'	Report	Try: Kpoku 16' c Gallagher 23' m Con: Malins (1/2) 17'; Pen: Malins 67'

AJ Bell Stadium
Attendance: 4,687
Referee: Anthony Woodthorpe

3 November 2018

Leicester Tigers	12 – 31	Worcester Warriors (1 BP)
Try: Owen 57' m Reffell 65' c Con: Hardwick (1/2) 66'	Report	Try: Hill 1' c Weir 5' c Hougaard 14' m Heem (2) 28' c, 61' m Con: Weir (3/5) 2', 7', 28'

Welford Road Stadium
Attendance: 17,815
Referee: Hamish Smales

==== Round 3 ====
10 November 2018
15:00

(1 BP) Leicester Tigers	16 – 18	Sale Sharks
Try: Thompson 39' c Con: Hardwick (1/1) 40'; Pen: Hardwick (3) 21', 25', 52'	Report	Try: Webber 16' m Penalty try 76'; Con: Du Preez (0/1); Pen: Du Preez (2) 10', 20'

Welford Road Stadium
Attendance: 17,023
Referee: Simon Harding

11 November 2018
15:00

(1 BP) Saracens	34 – 22	Worcester Warriors (1 BP)
Try: Burger 21' m Lewington 33' m Earl 42' c Crossdale (2) 45' m, 63' m Skelton 52' c Con: Malins (0/2); Whiteley (2/4) 42', 53'	Report	Try: Van Breda 25' c Williams 37' m Hammond 55' m Olivier 68' m Con: Van Breda (1/4) 26'

Allianz Park
Attendance: 4,804
Referee: Matthew O'Grady

=== Pool 3 ===
Pool 3
	Club	Played	Won	Drawn	Lost	Points For	Points Against	Points Difference	Tries For	Tries Against	Try Bonus	Losing Bonus	Points
1	Northampton Saints	4	3	0	1	125	72	53	18	10	2	1	15
2	Bristol Bears	4	2	0	2	85	95	-10	11	11	1	1	10
3	Gloucester	4	2	0	2	58	92	-34	8	13	1	0	9
4	Wasps	4	0	0	4	63	111	-48	7	14	0	1	1
If teams are level at any stage, tiebreakers are applied in the following order: 1. Number of matches won 2. Difference between points for and against 3. Total number of points for 4. Total number of tries scored
Green background means the club has qualified for the semi-finals as pool winner. Blue background means the club has qualified for the semi-finals as the best pool runner up. Updated: 2 February 2019; Note that each team plays 4 games; 3 pool games plus a derby game against a team in another pool. Source: "Premiership Rugby Cup 2018-19". Premiership Rugby.

==== Round 1 ====
27 October 2018
14:00

(1 BP) Northampton Saints	51 – 24	Bristol Bears (1 BP)
Try: Grayson 5' m Van Wyk (2) 9' m, 28' c Mitchell 40'+2 c Marshall 48' c Furbank 58' c Kellaway 68' c Con: Grayson (4/6) 29', 40'+3, 48', 59'; Furbank (1/1) 70'; Pen: Grayson (2) 19', 25'	Report	Try: Lindsay 16' m Crane 54' c Pincus 71' m Lam 78' c Con: Madigan (2/4) 56', 79'

Franklin's Gardens
Attendance: 12,172
Referee: Simon Harding

27 October 2018
15:00

(1 BP) Gloucester	31 – 7	Wasps
Try: Terry 2' m Vellacott 18' m Evans 21' c Coetzer 25' c Mullis 75' c Con: Evans (2/4) 22', 24'; Chapman 76'	Report	Try: Barbeary 80'+1 c Con: Jardine 80'+2

Kingsholm Stadium
Attendance: 12,709
Referee: Michael Hudson

==== Round 2 ====
2 November 2018
19:45

Bristol Bears	21 – 13	Gloucester
Try: Haining 27' c Thomas 65' c Heenan 74' c Con: Sheedy (2/2) 28', 75'; Eden (1/1) 67'	Report	Try: Penalty Try 80'+4; Pen: Williams (2) 42', 49'

Ashton Gate Stadium
Attendance: 9,944
Referee: Adam Leal

4 November 2018
15:00

(1 BP) Wasps	14 – 15	Northampton Saints
Try: Watson 13' c Willis 47' c Con: Searle (2/2) 14', 48'	Report	Try: Naiyaravoro 62' m Eadie 80+1' c Con: Grayson (1/2) 80+2'; Pen: Grayson 51'

Ricoh Arena
Attendance: 9,042
Referee: Sara Cox

==== Round 3 ====
9 November 2018
19:45

Gloucester	14 – 12	Northampton Saints (1 BP)
Try: Banahan 20' c Grobler 80'+1 c Con: Twelvetrees (2/2) 21', 80'+4	Report	Try: Francis 4' m Reinach 41' c Con: Grayson (1/2) 42'

Kingsholm Stadium
Attendance: 11,499
Referee: Greg Macdonald

11 November 2018
15:00

Wasps	19 – 30	Bristol Bears
Try: Bassett 16' c Con: Sopoaga (1/1) 17'; Pen: Sopoaga (4) 5', 28', 48', 69'	Report	Try: Edwards (2) 22' c, 76' c Malton 44' c Con: Sheedy (3/3) 23', 46', 77'; Pen: Sheedy (3) 2', 31', 73'

Ricoh Arena
Attendance: 8,352
Referee: Andrew Jackson

=== Round 4 (derby games) ===
After three pool games, each team will play a 'derby' game against a team in another pool, with results counting towards the final standings in each pool.

26 January 2019
15:00

(1 BP) Bristol Bears (P3)	10 – 12	Exeter Chiefs (P1)
Try: Edwards 41' c Con: Madigan (1/1) 41'; Pen: Madigan (1) 51'	Report	Try: Holmes 8' m Penalty Try 68'; Con: Skinner (0/1)

Ashton Gate Stadium
Attendance: 8,845
Referee: Luke Pearce

26 January 2019
15:00

Harlequins (P1)	12 – 32	Saracens (P2) (1 BP)
Try: Ibuanokpe 2' c Elia 42' m Con: Lang (1/2) 3'	Report	Try: Vailanu 4' m Malins 68' c Kpoku 49' c Segun 79' c Con: Malins (0/1); Lozowski (3/3) 50', 69', 80'; Pen: Malins 18'; Lozowski 45'

Twickenham Stoop
Attendance: 14,800
Referee: Wayne Barnes

26 January 2019
15:00

(1 BP) Northampton Saints (P3)	47 – 20	Leicester Tigers (P2)
Try: Grayson 14' c Fish 25' m Barrow 29' c Brüssow 45' c Reinach (2) 73' c, 79' c Collins 78' c Con: Grayson (6/7) 15', 31', 46', 74', 79', 80'	Report	Try: F.Tuilagi 7' c J. Ford 66' c Con: J. Ford (2/2) 8', 67'; Pen: J. Ford (2) 34', 49'

Franklin's Gardens
Attendance: 13,900
Referee: Adam Leal

3 February 2019
15:00

(1 BP) Worcester Warriors (P2)	35 – 23	Wasps (P3)
Try: Heem (2) 53' c, 68' c Ventor 60' c Waller 65' m Con: Weir (3/4) 54', 60', 67'; Pen: Weir (3) 21', 26', 37'	Report	Try: Bassett 16' m Miller 44' m Carr 78' c Con: Sopoaga (0/1); Searle (1/2) 78'; Pen: Sopoaga 23'; Searle 51'

Sixways Stadium
Attendance: 6,000
Referee: Mike Hudson

3 February 2019
15:00

Sale Sharks (P2)	12 – 28	Newcastle Falcons (1 BP) (P1)
Try: Van Rensburg 23' c Beaumont 72' m Con: Cliff (1/1) 24'; Wilkinson (0/1)	Report	Try: Chick 9' c Goneva 57' c Kibirige 65' c Blamire 75' c Con: Flood (3/3) 9', 58', 66'; Connon (1/1) 76'

AJ Bell Stadium
Attendance: 3,824
Referee: Hamish Smales

4 February 2019
19:30

Bath (P1)	52 – 0	Gloucester (P3)
Try: Rokoduguni (4) 2' c, 56' c, 72' c, 78' c McConnochie 15' c Walker 38' c Homer 64' c Con: Priestland (5/5) 3', 17', 39'+1, 57', 65'; Burns (2/2) 73', 79'; Pen: Priestland 13'	Report

Recreation Ground
Attendance: 7,644
Referee: JP Doyle

- Game originally due to be played on 2 February but postponed twice due to snow.

== Knock-out stage ==
The four qualifiers are seeded according to performance in the pool stage. The top 2 seeds host the semi-finals against the lower seeds, in a 1 v 4, 2v 3 format. Note, if two teams qualify from the same pool, they can still be drawn together in the semi-finals.

Teams are ranked by:

1 – competition points (4 for a win, 2 for a draw)
2 – where competition points are equal, greatest number of wins
3 – where the number of wins are equal, aggregate points difference
4 – where the aggregate points difference are equal, greatest number of points scored
5 – where the greatest number of points are equal, greatest number of tries scored

Rank	Pool leaders	Pts	Wins	Diff	PF	TF
1	Worcester Warriors	16	3	51	123	18
2	Northampton Saints	15	3	53	125	18
3	Newcastle Falcons	15	3	33	95	12
Rank	Pool runners–up	Pts	Wins	Diff	PF	TF
4	Saracens	16	3	40	110	15
5	Exeter Chiefs	15	3	25	88	13
6	Bristol Bears	10	2	-10	85	11

Semi-finals
Sixways
Worcester Warriors	22
Saracens	38
Franklin's Gardens
Northampton Saints	59
Newcastle Falcons	33

Final
Franklin's Gardens
Northampton Saints	23
Saracens	9

=== Semi-finals ===
8 February 2019
19:45

Worcester Warriors	22 – 38	Saracens
Try: David 43' m Howe (2) 56' c, 80' c Con: Weir (2/3) 57', 80'+1; Pen: Van Breda 40'	Report	Try: Whiteley 5' c Segun 10' m Malins 59' c Vailanu 65' c Con: Lozowski (3/4) 6', 60', 66'; Pen: Lozowski (4) 27', 35', 51', 54'

Sixways
Attendance: 5,115
Referee: Christophe Ridley

9 February 2019
12:15

Northampton Saints	59 – 33	Newcastle Falcons
Try: Furbank 28' c Tuala 35' c Ludlam 38' c Gibson 41' m Fish 46' c Naiyaravoro 55' c Brüssow (2) 65' c, 75' m Burrell 68' c Con: Grayson (7/9) 29', 36', 38', 47', 56', 66', 70'	Report	Try: Takulua 1' c Matavesi 9' c Goneva 13' c Kibirige 31' c Harris 50' m Con: Connon (4/5) 2', 9', 13', 32'

Franklin's Gardens
Attendance: 5,994
Referee: Craig Maxwell-Keys

=== Final ===
17 March 2019
15:00

Northampton Saints	23–9	Saracens
Try: Harrison 7' m Wood 23' m Tuala 30' c Con: Grayson (1/3) 31'; Pen: Grayson 55'; Francis 72'	Report	Pen: Malins (3) 11', 20', 28'

Franklin's Gardens
Attendance: 15,250
Referee: Ian Tempest

Northampton Saints
Saracens

== Attendances ==
Club	Home matches	Total	Average	Highest	Lowest	% Capacity
Bath	2	22,153	11,077	14,509	7,644	76%
Bristol Bears	2	18,789	9,395	9,944	8,845	35%
Exeter Chiefs	2	24,620	12,310	12,693	11,927	96%
Gloucester	2	24,208	12,104	12,709	11,499	75%
Harlequins	2	22,827	11,414	14,800	8,027	77%
Leicester Tigers	2	34,838	17,419	17,815	17,023	67%
Newcastle Falcons	2	11,927	5,964	6,502	5,425	58%
Northampton Saints	4	47,316	11,829	15,250	5,994	78%
Sale Sharks	2	8,511	4,256	4,687	3,824	35%
Saracens	2	11,998	5,999	7,194	4,804	60%
Wasps	2	17,394	8,697	9,042	8,352	27%
Worcester Warriors	3	17,721	5,907	6,606	5,115	51%

== Individual statistics ==
- Points scorers includes tries as well as conversions, penalties and drop goals. Appearance figures also include coming on as substitutes (unused substitutes not included).

=== Top points scorers ===
Rank	Player	Team	Appearances	Points
1	(England) James Grayson	Northampton Saints	6	62
2	(England) Max Malins	Saracens	6	41
3	(Scotland) Duncan Weir	Worcester Warriors	4	38
4	(England) Alex Lozowski	Saracens	2	27
4	(Ireland) Brett Connon	Newcastle Falcons	4	27
5	(England) Joe Ford	Leicester Tigers	4	26
6	(South Africa) Demetri Catrakilis	Harlequins	3	25
6	(England) Zach Kibirige	Newcastle Falcons	3	25
7	(England) Semesa Rokoduguni	Bath	1	20
7	(New Zealand) Bryce Heem	Worcester Warriors	3	20
7	(Tonga) Sione Vailanu	Saracens	4	20

=== Top try scorers ===
Rank	Player	Team	Appearances	Tries
1	(England) Zach Kibirige	Newcastle Falcons	3	5
2	(England) Semesa Rokoduguni	Bath	1	4
2	(New Zealand) Bryce Heem	Worcester Warriors	3	4
2	(Tonga) Sione Vailanu	Saracens	4	4
3	(South Africa) Heinrich Brüssow	Northampton Saints	2	3
3	(England) Ryan Edwards	Bristol Bears	2	3
3	(England) Ross Batty	Bath	3	3
3	(South Africa) Cobus Reinach	Northampton Saints	4	3

== Season records ==
=== Team ===
Largest home win — 52 points

52 – 0 Bath at home to Gloucester on 4 February 2019

Largest away win — 20 points

32 – 12 Saracens away to Harlequins on 26 January 2019

Most points scored — 59

59 – 33 Northampton Saints at home to Newcastle Falcons on 9 February 2019

Most tries in a match — 9

Northampton Saints at home to Newcastle Falcons on 9 February 2019

Most conversions in a match — 7 (2)

Bath at home to Gloucester on 4 February 2019
Northampton Saints at home to Newcastle Falcons on 9 February 2019

Most penalties in a match — 4 (4)

Harlequins away to Bath on 27 October 2018
Saracens at home to Leicester Tigers on 27 October 2018
Wasps at home to Bristol Bears on 11 November 2018
Saracens away to Worcester Warriors on 8 February 2019

Most drop goals in a match — 0

=== Player ===
Most points in a match — 20

(England) Semesa Rokoduguni for Bath at home to Gloucester on 4 February 2019

Most tries in a match — 4

(England) Semesa Rokoduguni for Bath at home to Gloucester on 4 February 2019

Most conversions in a match — 7

(England) James Grayson for Northampton Saints at home to Newcastle Falcons on 9 February 2019

Most penalties in a match — 4 (4)

(South Africa) Demetri Catrakilis for Harlequins away to Bath on 27 October 2018
(England) Max Malins for Saracens at home to Leicester Tigers on 27 October 2018
(New Zealand) Lima Sopoaga for Wasps at home to Bristol Bears on 11 November 2018
(England) Alex Lozowski for Saracens away to Worcester Warriors on 8 February 2019

Most drop goals in a match — 0

=== Attendances ===
Highest — 17,815

Leicester Tigers at home to Worcester Warriors on 3 November 2018

Lowest — 3,824

Sale Sharks at home to Newcastle Falcons on 3 February 2019

== See also ==
- Premiership Rugby
- Anglo-Welsh Cup
- 2018–19 RFU Championship Cup
- English rugby union system
- List of English rugby union teams
- Rugby union in England
