= Sheekey =

Sheekey is a surname. Notable people with the surname include:

- James Sheekey (born 1994), Welsh rugby union player
- Kevin Sheekey (born 1966), American businessman and political adviser

== See also ==
- Sheskey
