= Charles Thacker =

Charles Thacker may refer to:

- Charles M. Thacker (1866–1918), justice of the Oklahoma Supreme Court
- Charles P. Thacker (1943–2017), American pioneer computer designer
- Charlie Thacker (born 1996), English rugby union player
