= George Worth (rugby union) =

English rugby union player (born 1996)

- Born: George Arthur Rolt Worth; 8 October 1996 (age 30) Peterborough, England
- Height: 1.90 m (6 ft 3 in)
- Weight: 94 kg (14 st 11 lb)
- School: Wymondham College

Rugby union career
- Position: Full Back
- Current team: Melbourne Rebels
Senior career
Years	Team	Apps	(Points)
2016–2021	Leicester Tigers	62	(25)
2015–2016	Coventry (loan)	7	(5)
2016–2017	Nottingham (loan)	5	(10)
2021	Melbourne Rebels (loan)	5	(3)
2022	Melbourne Rebels	9	(0)
2023	Ampthill		
2023	Valence Romans		
2025	Bedford Blues		
- Correct as of 2 May 2026

George Arthur Rolt Worth (born 8 October 1996) is an English rugby union full back for Melbourne Rebels in Australia's Super Rugby AU. He has previously played for Leicester Tigers in England's Premiership Rugby and for Coventry and Nottingham on loan from Leicester.

== Career ==
He made his Tigers debut against Bath at the Rec in May 2016 at the age of 19 having been a Tigers season ticket holder since the age of 7. He went to Wymondham College in Norfolk as a boarder, attending from school years 7 to 11, and playing in the same school rugby team as fellow Leicester Tiger Will Evans.

On 3 March 2021 Worth moved on loan to Melbourne Rebels in Australia's Super Rugby AU for the 2021 season.

On 11 August 2021, he was released from his Leicester contract, and on 15 September it was announced he had re-joined the Melbourne Rebels on a one-year contract.

== Super Rugby statistics ==
As of 30 May 2022

Season	Team	Games	Starts	Sub	Mins	Tries	Cons	Pens	Drops	Points	Yel	Red
2021 AU	Rebels	1	0	1	2	0	0	0	0	0	0	0
2021 TT	Rebels	4	4	0	304	0	0	1	0	3	0	0
2022	Rebels	9	5	4	404	0	0	0	0	0	0	0
Total		14	9	5	710	0	0	1	0	3	0	0
