= Sheskey =

Sheskey is a surname. Notable people with the surname include:

- Linda Sheskey (born 1962), American middle-distance runner
- Rusten Sheskey, American police officer

== See also ==
- Sheekey
