= Conn McCall =

Irish cricketer

Cricket information
- Batting: Right-handed
- Bowling: Left-arm orthodox spin

International information
- National side: Ireland

Career statistics
Competition	First-class
Matches	7
Runs scored	308
Batting average	23.69
100s/50s	0/2
Top score	81
Catches/stumpings	3/–
- Source: CricketArchive, 16 November 2022

Hugh Conn McCall (29 March 1940 – 7 June 2002), usually known by his middle name, was an Irish cricketer. A right-handed batsman and left-arm orthodox spin bowler, he played 15 times for the Ireland cricket team in the 1960s including seven first-class matches. His son Mark played rugby union for Ireland.

== Cricket career ==
Conn McCall was scheduled to make his debut for Ireland in their annual match against Scotland in 1964, but the match was abandoned without a ball being bowled. He finally made his debut a few days later, playing against the MCC in a first-class match. His first match in 1965 was also against the MCC, at Lord's, and he also played against New Zealand, Scotland and Hampshire that year.

He played three times in 1966, against Scotland, the MCC and Worcestershire, and four times in 1967, including a match against India. His final year in the Irish side was in 1968, playing twice against Australia before finishing his career as it should have started, playing against Scotland in a first-class match. He later served as an Irish selector in the early 1980s and as president of the Irish Cricket Union in 1992.

=== Statistics ===
In all matches for Ireland, he scored 541 runs at an average of 20.04, with a top score of 81 against the MCC in his debut match, one of three half-century for Ireland. He bowled just one delivery, conceding the winning single against New Zealand in 1965.
