= Dominic Barrow =

English rugby union player (born 1993)

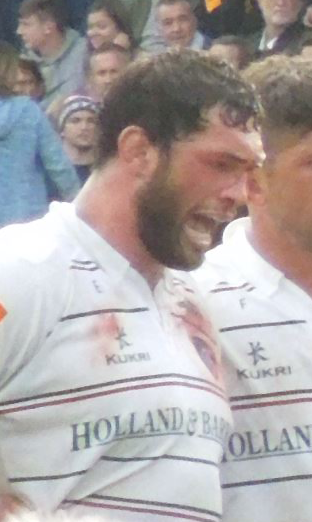
- Barrow playing for Leicester in 2017
- Born: Dominic Edward Barrow; 19 March 1993 (age 33) Sheffield, England
- Height: 2.00 m (6 ft 7 in)
- Weight: 135 kg (21 st 4 lb)
- School: Prince Henry's

Rugby union career
- Position: Lock
Senior career
| Years | Team | Apps | (Points) |
| 2010–2013 | Yorkshire Carnegie | 27 | (5) |
| 2013–2015 | Newcastle Falcons | 37 | (0) |
| 2015–2018 | Leicester Tigers | 54 | (15) |
| 2018 | →La Rochelle | 2 | (0) |
| 2018–2019 | Northampton Saints | 7 | (5) |
| 2022–2023 | Sale Sharks | 9 | (0) |
| 2010–2023 | Total | 136 | (25) |
- Correct as of 3 February 2023
International career
| Years | Team | Apps | (Points) |
- England U16
| 2009–2011 | England U18 | 15 | (25) |
| 2012–2013 | England U20 | 19 | (0) |

Dominic Edward Barrow (born 19 March 1993) is an English former rugby union player who played as a lock. He played for Yorkshire Carnegie in the RFU Championship, Newcastle Falcons, Leicester Tigers and Northampton Saints in Premiership Rugby and La Rochelle in France's Top 14. After initially retiring from the game in 2020 Barrow returned in February 2022 to finish his career with Sale Sharks.

== Club career ==
Barrow came through the Yorkshire Carnegie academy to make his first-team debut at the age of seventeen starting in an Anglo-Welsh Cup game against Scarlets in November 2010. That season also saw him feature in the EPCR Challenge Cup.

On 10 June 2013, Barrow joined Newcastle Falcons on a two-year contract from the 2013–14 season. However, he was granted early release, to sign for Leicester Tigers from the 2015–16 season. In his first campaign with Leicester he started in their 2015–16 European Rugby Champions Cup semi-final elimination against Racing 92 at the City Ground. The following season saw Barrow come off the bench as a substitute in the 2016–17 Anglo-Welsh Cup final as Leicester defeated Exeter Chiefs to lift the trophy.

On 22 March 2018, Barrow left Leicester to join La Rochelle in France's Top 14 with immediate effect as a medical joker and on the same date it was also confirmed that he would join Premiership rivals Northampton Saints for the following 2018–19 season. In March 2019 after only one season with Northampton it was confirmed that Barrow would leave the club.

After two years of retirement from the game, Barrow returned to professional rugby in February 2022 with Premiership Rugby club Sale Sharks on a permanent deal after impressive performances initially on trial. In May 2023 it was confirmed that Barrow had left Sale.

== International career ==
Barrow captained England at under-16 and under-18 levels. He represented England under-20 in the 2012 Six Nations Under 20s Championship and started in the last round as they defeated Ireland to win the tournament. He was also included in the team that finished seventh at the 2012 IRB Junior World Championship.

Barrow was part of the side that retained the 2013 Six Nations Under 20s Championship. Later that year he was a member of the squad at the 2013 IRB Junior World Championship and started in the final as England defeated Wales to become youth world champions for the first time.

Barrow was named in an initial senior England training squad preparing for their 2017 tour of Argentina but was ultimately not included for the trip.

== Honours ==
Leicester Tigers

- 1× Anglo-Welsh Cup: 2016–17

England U20

- 1× World Rugby U20 Championship: 2013
- 2× Six Nations Under 20s Championship: 2012, 2013
