= Will Cliff =

English rugby union player

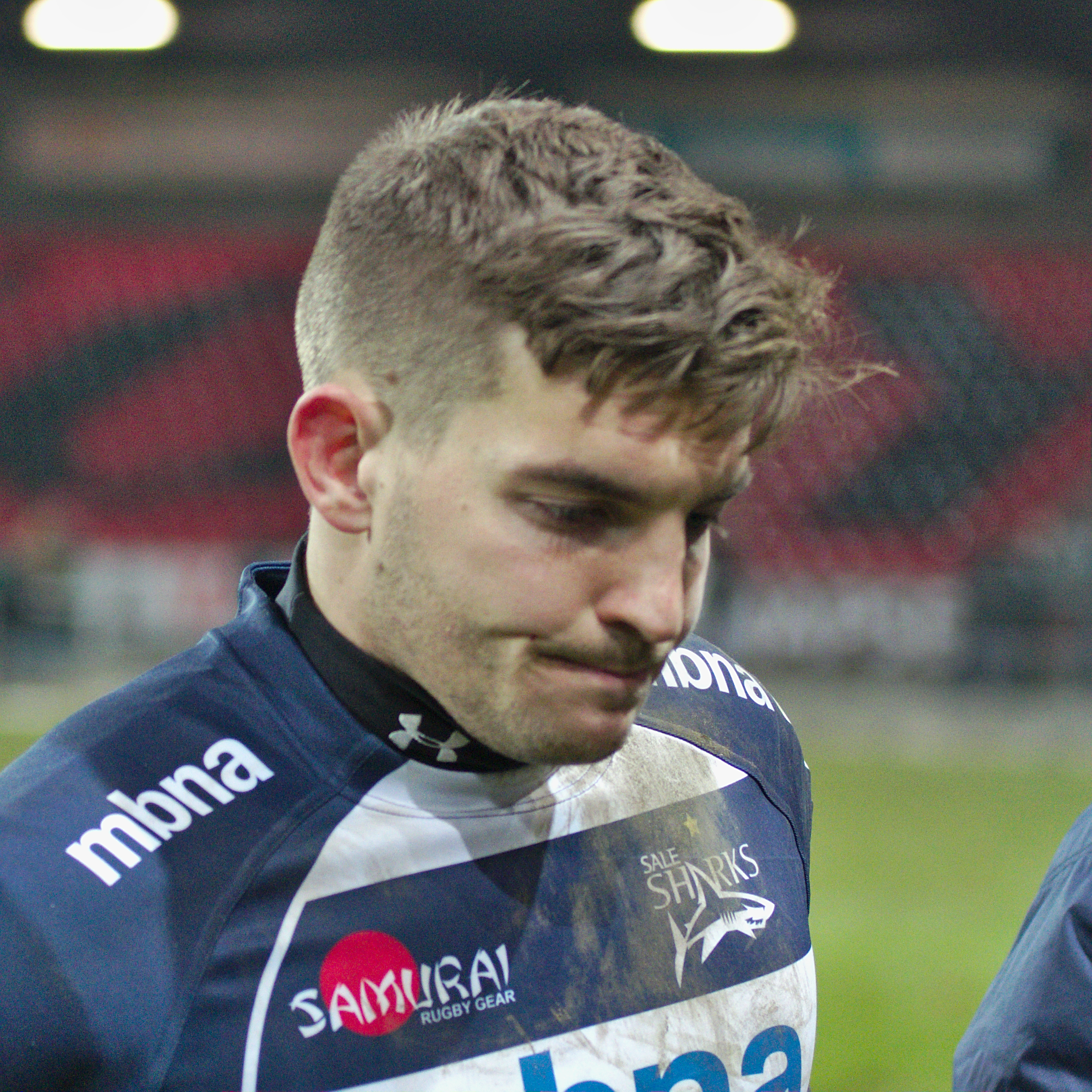
- Cliff in 2013
- Born: William Cliff; 17 October 1988 (age 38) Macclesfield, Cheshire, England
- Height: 5 ft 10 in (1.78 m)
- Weight: 13 st 1 lb (83 kg)

Rugby union career
- Position: Scrum-half
Amateur team(s)
Years	Team	Apps	(Points)
- Sandbach
- Macclesfield
Senior career
Years	Team	Apps	(Points)
2006–2015	Sale Sharks	113	(25)
2010	→ Glasgow Warriors	0	(0)
2011–2012	→ Yorkshire Carnegie	13	(0)
2015–2017	Bristol Rugby	45	(40)
2017–2023	Sale Sharks	121	(114)
- Correct as of 6 May 2023

William Cliff (born 17 October 1988) is an English former rugby union player. His position was scrum-half and he made the majority of his career appearances at Sale Sharks.

== Career ==
Cliff came through the academy of Sale Sharks and made his senior club debut in 2007. In April 2008 he scored his first try for Sale during their 49–24 win over CA Brive in the EPCR Challenge Cup quarter-final. Later that month he featured in their semi-final elimination against Bath.

Cliff joined Glasgow Warriors in 2010 with a view to getting a loan deal with the club but registration problems meant that the deal fell through and he returned to Sale. He spent the 2011–12 RFU Championship campaign with Yorkshire Carnegie.

After making 113 appearance in his first spell at the club, Cliff left Sale to join Bristol Bears in 2015. In his first season he scored a try in the 2015–16 RFU Championship play-off final against Doncaster Knights which Bristol won to seal promotion to the top flight.

After two seasons with Bristol, Cliff returned to Sale in 2017. He started in the 2019–20 Premiership Rugby Cup final which saw Sale beat Harlequins to win their first silverware for fourteen years. In 2023 it was announced that Cliff had retired.

== Honours ==
Sale Sharks

- 1× Premiership Rugby Cup: 2019–20

Bristol

- 1× RFU Championship: 2015–16
