= Pierce Phillips =

English rugby union footballer

- Born: Pierce Phillips; 6 October 1992 (age 34) Middlesbrough, England
- Height: 2.03 m (6 ft 8 in)
- Weight: 119 kg (18 st 10 lb; 262 lb)

Rugby union career
- Position: Lock
Senior career
Years	Team	Apps	(Points)
2012–2013	Leeds Tykes	4	(0)
2013–2014	Darlington Mowden Park	0	(0)
2014–2017	Jersey Reds	55	(25)
2017–2019	Worcester Warriors	37	(5)
2019–2021	Agen	28	(0)
2021–2023	Edinburgh Rugby	15	(5)
2023	→ Edinburgh 'A'	2	(0)
- Correct as of 26 April 2023

Pierce Phillips (born 6 October 1992) is an English rugby union player who last played for Edinburgh Rugby in the United Rugby Championship

== Rugby Union career ==
After played for Leeds Tykes academy and stints with Darlington Mowden Park. Phillips signed for Jersey Reds in the RFU Championship from the summer of 2014. On 28 July 2016, he was named new club captain for Jersey during the 2016-17 season.

On 22 February 2017, Phillips signed for Aviva Premiership side Worcester Warriors ahead of the 2017-18 season. On 26 February 2019, Phillips moves to France with Agen in the Top 14 on a two-year deal next season.
