= Jack Roberts (rugby union) =

Welsh rugby union player

- Born: 20 November 1991 (age 34) Bangor, Gwynedd, Wales
- Height: 1.73 m (5 ft 8 in)
- Weight: 91 kg (14 st 5 lb)
- School: Ysgol Glan y Môr, Pwllheli

Rugby union career
- Position: Centre
- Current team: Jersey Reds
Senior career
Years	Team	Apps	(Points)
2011–2013	Llandovery	48	(92)
2013–2014	Rotherham Titans	38	(55)
2014–2017	Leicester Tigers	36	(10)
2017–2019	Cardiff Blues	6	(0)
2019–2020	Doncaster Knights	12	(10)
2020	Jersey Reds		
- Correct as of 22 May 2017
- Correct as of July 2016

Jack Roberts (born 20 November 1991) is a Welsh rugby union player who plays centre for Jersey Reds.

Roberts was born and raised in North Wales before moving at 16 to Llandovery College in West Wales. He was part of Llanelli Scarlets academy and played two seasons for Llandovery RFC in the Welsh Premiership. He was named as the division's player of the month in April 2013 after scoring 4 tries in the month.

On 23 May 2013 Rotherham Titans announced Roberts had signed for them for the 2013/14 season in the English Championship. Roberts played 27 times for Rotherham that season.

On 29 October 2014 Roberts joined Leicester Tigers with immediate effect. He made his starting debut against Northampton Saints in the LV Cup.

Following injuries to centre regulars Manu Tuilagi, Matt Smith and Matt To'omua, Roberts was promoted to the first team. On 14 February 2017, Roberts moves to the Cardiff Blues in the Pro14 from the 2017–18 season.

However, a series of long-term injuries saw the centre struggling to establish himself at the Welsh capital, resulting in a move to Doncaster Knights ahead of the 2019/20 campaign.

On 13 June 2020, Roberts left Doncaster to join Championship rivals Jersey Reds ahead of the 2020–21 season.
