= Max Malins =

England international rugby union player

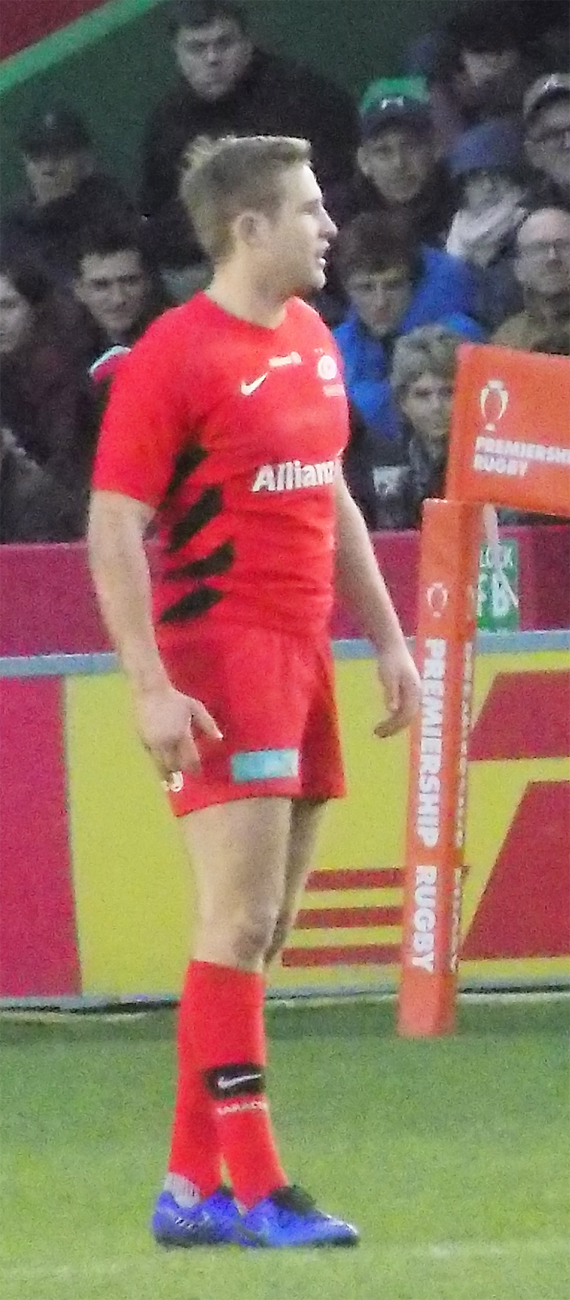
- Malins representing Saracens during the Gallagher Premiership
- Full name: Maxim Hugo Malins
- Born: 7 January 1997 (age 29) Cambridge, England
- Height: 1.80 m (5 ft 11 in)
- Weight: 88 kg (194 lb; 13 st 12 lb)
- School: Felsted School
- University: University of Hertfordshire

Rugby union career
- Position(s): Wing, Fullback, Fly-half
- Current team: Saracens
Senior career
Years	Team	Apps	(Points)
2015–2023	Saracens	73	(269)
2015–2017	Old Albanian	19	(213)
2020–2021	→ Bristol Bears (loan)	19	(111)
2023–2025	Bristol Bears	17	(50)
2025–	Saracens	19	(40)
- Correct as of 16 April 2026
International career
Years	Team	Apps	(Points)
–	England U18	5	(10)
2016–2017	England U20	17	(114)
2020–	England	22	(10)
- Correct as of 24 October 2023

Maxim Hugo Malins (born 7 January 1997) is an English professional rugby union player who plays as a wing for Premiership Rugby club Saracens and formerly for the England national team.

== Early life ==
Malins' first participation in rugby was at his local rugby club, Saffron Walden, aged 6. His rugby then moved to his new club, Bishop's Stortford RFC, where he remained playing until the age of 16. While at Bishop's Stortford he participated in the winning of 7 age-group tournaments.

Malins attended Felsted School from a young age, and his rugby highlights included reaching the final of the NatWest Schools Cup U18 Vase. While playing a school game for Felsted he was identified by Saracens' scout Matt Davies, before being invited to join the Saracens junior academy at 17. Whilst at school Malins was also a promising cricketer and field hockey player, representing the school 1st XI at both sports from the age of 15 and top scoring in the 2014 Cape Town international Hockey Festival.

As of 2018, Malins was studying a business and finance degree at the University of Hertfordshire.

== Club career ==
=== Old Albanians ===
During his time in the Senior academy Malins held dual registration with Old Albanian. He played 19 games for them with a high scoring rate of 11 points per game. His performance during the 2015/16 season aided significantly in returning the Old Albanians to National League 1 via the play-off mechanism.

=== Saracens ===
Malins made his first team debut in January 2017, coming on as a substitute against the Scarlets in the Anglo-Welsh Cup. Since then he has played 29 games across all competitions, with a particular focus in the Anglo-Welsh and international breaks, which caused the absence of Owen Farrell and Alex Lozowski. He has scored 104 points in these games. However while his try rate (7 in 29) has been high, his place-kicking success rate has been fairly low (63%).

With reasonable success in his games in the 17/18 season, and an increased likelihood of both Saracens' first choice fly-halves missing games due to international duty, Malins was offered and accepted a two-year contract extension, to the end of the 2019/20 season. In March 2019, Malins scored all nine points for Saracens in their 9–23 defeat to the Northampton Saints in the final of the 2019 Premiership Rugby Cup.

He helped Saracens win the Premiership title in 2023, scoring a try in the final as Saracens defeated Sale Sharks.

=== Bristol ===
He agreed a further contract extension which saw him join Bristol Bears on loan until the end of the 2020–21 season along with teammate Ben Earl. In October 2020 Malins scored a try as Bristol defeated Toulon in the final of the European Rugby Challenge Cup. During his spell at Bristol, Malins played primarily at fullback and has a high try scoring rate of 11 tries from 11 starts (+2 appearances off the bench) as of 21/04/21. Malins returned to Bristol ahead of the 2023-24 Premiership Rugby season.

=== Return to Saracens ===
In February 2025, Saracens announced he would re-join the club from Bristol Bears following the conclusion of the 2024–25 season. In October 2025, he scored his first try in the league in his second stint with the club in a 50–17 victory against Bristol Bears.

== International career ==
=== England U18 ===
Malins' England Under-18 debut game occurred in February 2015, where he scored a try. He also participated in the victory against Scotland shortly afterwards. Malins was selected for the 3-month tour to South Africa by the U18 England team in the summer of 2015. The 3-month tour, as well as a number of regional games, had 3 primary games: the France U18 team and two games against South Africa U18.

=== England U20 ===
Malins participated, primarily at fullback, in England winning the 2016 World Rugby Under 20 Championship hosted in Manchester. He scored tries against Scotland in the pool stage and in the semi-final against South Africa. He started at full back in the final against Ireland. The following year he was a member of the squad that completed the grand slam in the 2017 Six Nations Under 20s Championship and then featured at fly-half as England reached the final of the 2017 World Rugby Under 20 Championship, before being defeated by New Zealand. He was particularly noted by England U20 head coach Ian Vass as being a major figure in their success, acting as a calmer figure around which the team could bond. He acted as the primary place-kicker in the latter competition for the majority of his games with a 72% success rate.

=== England ===
In October 2020 he was called up to the senior England squad by head coach Eddie Jones. On 14 November 2020 Malins made his Test debut as a second-half replacement for Ollie Lawrence in their opening fixture of the Autumn Nations Cup against Georgia. He also came off the bench in the final of that competition as England defeated France in extra-time to win the tournament.

== Career statistics ==
=== List of international tries ===
As of 12 February 2023

Try	Opposing team	Location	Venue	Competition	Date	Result	Score
1	Scotland	London, England	Twickenham Stadium	2023 Six Nations	4 February 2023	Loss	23 – 29
2	Scotland	London, England	Twickenham Stadium	2023 Six Nations	4 February 2023	Loss	23 – 29
