= Charlie Thacker =

English rugby union player

- Born: Charles Michael Thacker; 10 August 1996 (age 30) Leicester, England
- Height: 1.77 m (5 ft 10 in)
- Weight: 87 kg (13 st 10 lb)
- Notable relative: Harry Thacker (Brother)

Rugby union career
- Position: Centre
Senior career
Years	Team	Apps	(Points)
2014–2019	Leicester Tigers	12	(5)
2020–	Nottingham		
- Correct as of 1 July 2020

Charles Michael Thacker (born 10 August 1996) is an English rugby union centre who plays for Nottingham in the RFU Championship. He previously played for Leicester Tigers in Premiership Rugby.

== Early life ==
Thacker was born in Leicester. His elder brother is Bristol Bears hooker Harry Thacker, and his father Troy Thacker also played hooker for Leicester.

== Career ==
Thacker made his Leicester Tigers debut on 1 November 2014 in a 17-16 win against London Irish in the Anglo-Welsh Cup. He scored his first try for the club on 4 November 2017 against Gloucester again in the Anglo-Welsh Cup and was named as the fans' man of the match for his performance.

On 15 May 2019 he was announced as one of the players to leave Leicester following the end of the 2018-19 Premiership Rugby season.
