= Tom Hendrickson =

- Born: Thomas Craig Gilbert Hendrickson; 1 September 1994 (age 32) Nelson, New Zealand
- Height: 1.85 m (6 ft 1 in)
- Weight: 100 kg (15 st 10 lb)

Rugby union career
- Position: Centre
- Current team: North Harbour
Senior career
Years	Team	Apps	(Points)
2013–2023	Exeter Chiefs	62	(35)
2013–2014	→ Redruth	1	(0)
2013–2017	→ Cornish Pirates	63	(45)
2017–2018	→ Plymouth Albion	6	(15)
2023–2025	Kintetsu Liners	26	(10)
2025	North Harbour	5	(5)
2025	Worcester Warriors		
- Correct as of 4 October 2025

Tom Hendrickson (born 1 September 1994) is a New Zealand professional rugby union player, currently playing for English club Worcester Warriors in the Champ Rugby. He plays as a centre.

== Career ==
Hendrickson made his debut for the Chiefs in November 2013, featuring in a LV= Cup win over Harlequins FC at Sandy Park and started for the first time with Exeter against Ospreys a week later in the LV= Cup.

Hendrickson played on 30 March 2018 as Exeter Chiefs beat Bath Rugby in the final of the Anglo-Welsh Cup. The previous season he had been a replacement in the Anglo-Welsh cup final but Exeter lost to Leicester Tigers on that occasion.

After 10 years with Exeter, he announced in December 2023 that he was leaving the club to take up a playing opportunity in Japan.

Hendrickson returned to New Zealand in 2025, signing with North Harbour for the 2025 Bunnings NPC.

On 5 December 2025, Hendrickson returns to England as he signed for re-vamped Worcester Warriors in the Champ Rugby for the 2025-26 season.

== Personal life ==
Born in Nelson, New Zealand to a Kiwi father and Cornish mother he was five when they came to Cornwall and at age seven began playing for the Cornish Pirates minis.

== Honours ==
Anglo-Welsh Cup

Winners 2017-18

Runner-Up 2016-17
