= Ryan Edwards (rugby union) =

- Born: Ryan Edwards; 22 September 1990 (age 36) England
- Height: 185 cm (6 ft 1 in)
- Weight: 88 kg (13 st 12 lb)

Rugby union career
- Position: Wing
- Current team: Cardiff Blues
Senior career
Years	Team	Apps	(Points)
2012–2020	Bristol Bears	73	(135)
2018	→ Cardiff Blues (loan)	1	(0)
2020	→ Cardiff Blues (loan)	1	(5)
- Correct as of 15 March 2020

Ryan Edwards (born 22 September 1990) is an English rugby union player who recently played for Cardiff Blues on loan from the Bristol Bears as a wing.

Edwards made his debut for the Cardiff Blues regional team in 2017 having previously played for the Bristol Bears and the University of West England.
