= Will Evans (rugby union) =

English rugby union player

- Born: William Giles Evans; 28 January 1997 (age 29) Norwich, England
- Height: 1.83 m (6 ft 0 in)
- Weight: 102 kg (16 st 1 lb)
- School: Wyggeston and Queen Elizabeth I College

Rugby union career
- Position: Flanker
- Current team: Harlequins
Senior career
Years	Team	Apps	(Points)
2016–2019	Leicester Tigers	43	(25)
2019–	Harlequins	107	(75)
- Correct as of 8 February 2025
International career
Years	Team	Apps	(Points)
2016	England U20	4	(5)
- Correct as of 25 June 2016

William Giles Evans (born 28 January 1997) is an English professional rugby union player who plays as a openside flanker for Premiership Rugby club Harlequins. He previously played for Leicester Tigers, he made his Tigers debut against Gloucester having graduated from the academy.

== Career ==
Evans made his Tigers debut on 2 April 2016 against Gloucester at Welford Road; at the age of 19 years and 64 days old he became the second youngest forward to play for Leicester in the Premiership.

Evans was selected for the England U20 team that hosted the 2016 World Rugby Under 20 Championship and scored a try in a pool stage game against Scotland. He started in the final as England defeated Ireland to become junior world champions. He was subsequently named in tournament's "Dream Team". He was also the only Under 20s player to make the Sky Sports Team of the Week at the end of June 2016. Evans received his first call up to the senior England squad by coach Eddie Jones on 1 August 2016 for a pre-season training squad.

On his 20th birthday, Evans scored a try in the 27–20 win over Northampton Saints in which Tigers qualified for the semifinals of the 2016–17 Anglo-Welsh Cup however he injured himself in the process and didn't return until 9 April, when he played for the A-side against Worcester. At the end of that season Evans was initially chosen to play at the 2017 World Rugby Under 20 Championship however he was unable to participate due to injury.

In March 2019 it was announced that Evans would join Harlequins. In his first season with the club he started in the Premiership Rugby Cup final which they lost against Sale Sharks to finish runners up. The following campaign saw Harlequins win the Premiership however Evans missed the final due to injury.

In April 2024, Evans scored a try in Harlequins 42–41 defeat of Bordeaux Bègles. It was only the second time overall and the first time away that the club had won a knockout game in the European Champions Cup. He also scored a try in their semi-final elimination against Toulouse. At the end of the campaign, following four tries and 98 tackles across seven appearances he was named in the Investec Champions Cup Team of the Season for the 2023–24.

In October 2024, Evans scored twice and won man of the match in Harlequins 36–19 win against Exeter Chiefs to help secure their first win at Sandy Park in 10 years.

== Honours ==
Harlequins

- 1× Premiership: 2020–2021

England U20

- 1× World Rugby U20 Championship: 2016
