= Mark McCall =

Irish rugby union player and coach

- Full name: Mark Conn McCall
- Born: 29 November 1967 (age 58) Bangor, Northern Ireland
- Height: 1.77 m (5 ft 10 in)
- Weight: 80 kg (13 st; 180 lb)
- School: Bangor Grammar School
- University: Queen's University Belfast
- Notable relative: Conn McCall (father)

Rugby union career
- Position: Inside Centre
Amateur team(s)
Years	Team	Apps	(Points)
1986-1996	Bangor RFC		
1996-97	Dungannon RFC		
Senior career
Years	Team	Apps	(Points)
1989-1997	Ulster		
1997-1998	London Irish		
1998	Ulster		
International career
Years	Team	Apps	(Points)
1992–1998	Ireland	13	(0)
Coaching career
- Years: Team
- 1999–2004: Ulster (assistant)
- 2003–2004: Ireland U21 (head coach)
- 2004–2007: Ulster (head coach)
- 2007–2009: Castres (backs coach)
- 2009–2011: Saracens (assistant)
- 2011–2026: Saracens (director of rugby)

Mark Conn McCall (born 29 November 1967) is an Irish professional rugby union coach and former player, who is the current director of rugby of Premiership Rugby club Saracens. He arrived as an assistant in 2009 and took charge of the first-team in 2011. He is considered one of the greatest club managers of all time, and holds the record for the most English championships won with six Premiership trophies. McCall also led Saracens to three European Rugby Champions Cup wins.

As a player, McCall was an inside centre and spent the majority of his career with Ulster. He was capped 13 times for the Ireland national team, making his debut against New Zealand on 30 May 1992 as a substitute.

== Early life ==
Mark McCall was born on 29 November 1967 in Bangor, Northern Ireland. His father, Conn McCall, was a prominent sportsman, playing cricket for Ireland and rugby for Bangor, and serving as president of the Irish Cricket Union and co-president of the IRFU. Mark attended Bangor Grammar School, and played fly-half for their rugby team as they won two successive Ulster Schools' Cup finals in 1985 and 1986, excelling to the point of becoming captain of the first team.

== Playing career ==
Nicknamed "Smally", he played club rugby for Bangor, later for Dungannon, and representative rugby for Ulster, making his provincial debut in 1989. He made his debut for Ireland in the 1992 tour of New Zealand, and made occasional appearances before becoming a regular in the team in 1997 and 1998. In 1997 he was offered a full-time contract with Ulster, but turned it down to sign for London Irish. He returned to Ulster the following season, and was named captain by coach Harry Williams. However, he was forced to retire as a player at the age of 31 due to a prolapsed disc sustained while playing for Ulster against Glasgow in August 1998, and he was unable to participate in Ulster's 1998–99 Heineken Cup-winning campaign.

== Coaching career ==
=== Ulster ===
After a brief pause, post-retirement McCall started as a formal coach for both Ireland U21s and Ireland A as well as a deputy coach for Ulster. This converted to a full time position by 2001 and in 2004, with the departure of Alan Solomons he became Head Coach at Ulster. In 2006, McCall would take Ulster to victory in the Celtic Cup. Under his tutelage nine Ulster players played in the Irish team, the highest number since the game went professional. However, within 18 months, McCall handed his resignation with Ulster bottom of the Magners League and poor European performance.

=== Castres ===
McCall, along with friend and fellow Ulsterman Jeremy Davidson, joined a new coaching team being established at Castres after dismissals forced by a poor early start and team dissension. The new coaching setup's minimum target was to ensure a top-six finish (to guarantee Heineken Cup qualification), which was managed with a fifth-place finish.

=== Saracens ===
McCall signed with Premiership Rugby side Saracens to join up with new coach Brendan Venter for the 09/10 season as first team coach; after Brendan Venter left midway through the 2010/2011 season he took charge as Director of Rugby, at the beginning of 2013 he renewed his contract until the end of 2015. In the 2010–11 season his team was unbeaten and went on to win the Premiership. In the 2012 season he managed them to go on to be the only English team to qualify for the Heineken Cup.

McCall, though he has appeared far less in the news than his predecessor, who was penalised several times for speaking against rugby's organising bodies, was notable in attacking the difficulties being faced by English teams within the Heineken Cup. He has also appeared in the news for his radical increasing of the rotation system at Saracens, despite occasional controversy, either on account of lost chances by Saracens or accusations that rotational policy undermines the sport. Although this seems to be successful for McCall.

McCall defeated Clermont to win Saracens' first European Semi-final to lead Saracens to the Heineken Cup Final in 2014 where they lost to Toulon.

In 2015 McCall's Saracens won the Premiership against Bath 28-16.

The 2015–16 season saw McCall take his team to even higher heights by successfully completing the double. Saracens successfully retaining the Aviva Premiership trophy by defeating Exeter 28-20 while defeating Racing 92 in the second final of the European Champions Cup. McCall's rotation strategy proved particularly successful, enabling Saracens to win all 9 games in the Cup - a first in European rugby. While McCall has been significantly quieter in the media than his predecessor, he openly challenged the timing of an England training session shortly before the ECC began which led to multiple player injuries.

The 2016–17 season would allow a double at the ECC Cup, beating Clermont 28-17 before an early knock-out in the AP, losing in the semi-finals against Exeter.

Heading into the 2017/18 season McCall would note the knock-on effects of the Lions tour – tiredness and, especially, lack of pre-season time. This looked to become true as Saracens fell into a seven-game losing streak (the worst in over a decade) towards the end of 2017, with a bare mathematical scrape into the ECC Quarter-Finals. Saracens would then be knocked out against Leinster (the ultimate ECC champions), their earliest departure in six years. However additional rest time enabled a strong AP run-in, with a 27-10 defeat of Exeter to retake the AP trophy.

While McCall is frequently known as quiet and generally turns down interviews, his performances and widespread respect have also led to him being awarded the Aviva Premiership Director of Rugby in 2012/13, 2013/14, 2015/16 and 2018/19.

In April 2021, he signed a four-year contract extension which will see him remain at Saracens until at least the 2024–25 season. In January 2022 it was confirmed he would take a short break from the role for medical reasons. He returned in March 2022.

On 27 May 2023, he won his sixth English Premiership Rugby title, beating 35–25 Sale Sharks in the final.

== Personal life ==
A Queen's University Belfast graduate, McCall has a law degree (a qualification he shared with his brother, Peter) and during rugby union's amateur era he worked for the Independent Commission for Police Complaints. He worked part-time at a solicitor's office between retiring as player and taking up coaching.

He has two children – Bryn and Jemma – who were born two years apart.

== Honours ==
=== Coach ===
==== Ulster ====
- Celtic League: 2005–06

==== Saracens ====
- European Rugby Champions Cup: 2015–16, 2016–17, 2018–19
- Premiership Rugby: 2010–11, 2014–15, 2015–16, 2017–18, 2018–19, 2022–23
- Anglo-Welsh Cup: 2014–15
- RFU Championship: 2020–21
- Heineken Cup runner-up: 2013–14
- Premiership Rugby runner-up: 2013–14, 2021–22
- Premiership Rugby Cup runner-up: 2018–19

==== Individual ====
- Premiership Coach of the Year: 2012–13, 2013–14, 2015–16, 2018–19, 2022–23
