= Aaron Morris (rugby union) =

English rugby union player

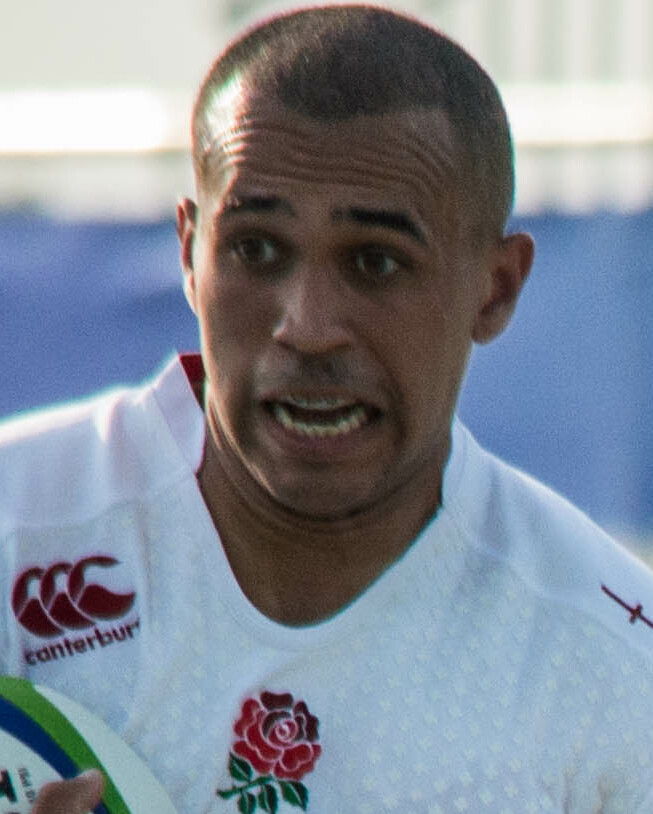
- Morris in 2015
- Born: Aaron James Morris; 10 January 1995 (age 31) Bedford, England
- Height: 1.88 m (6 ft 2 in)
- Weight: 95 kg (15.0 st; 209 lb)
- School: Biddenham School

Rugby union career
- Position(s): Wing, Fullback
Senior career
Years	Team	Apps	(Points)
2012–2016	Saracens	0	(0)
2012–2014	→Bedford Blues (loan)	9	(10)
2015–2016	→London Scottish (loan)	8	(10)
2016–2023	Harlequins	69	(20)
- Correct as of 6 October 2023
International career
Years	Team	Apps	(Points)
2014–2015	England U20	15	(20)
- Correct as of 20 June 2015

Aaron James Morris (born 10 January 1995) is an English former rugby union player. A wing or fullback, he won the Premiership with Harlequins and represented England at youth level.

== Career ==
Morris started playing rugby for Bedford Junior Blues at the age of five. He played fly-half until the age of 16 but then switched to fullback; at 17 he became Bedford Blues' youngest player in the professional era. From the age of 18 Morris was training with Saracens. He never made a first team appearance for Saracens but did spend time on loan at London Scottish, making his debut against Munster A in the British and Irish Cup.

Morris represented England at youth level and scored a penalty from his own half as England under-20 defeated South Africa in the final of the 2014 IRB Junior World Championship at Eden Park. The following year he was a member of the side that won the 2015 Six Nations Under 20s Championship and finished runners up to New Zealand at the 2015 Junior World Cup.

In May 2016 it was announced that Morris had signed for Harlequins. He extended his contract with the club in 2017 and again in 2019. Harlequins won the 2020–21 Premiership Rugby title but Morris picked up an injury in the semi-final against Bristol Bears which meant he missed the final against Exeter Chiefs.

Morris announced his retirement in April 2023 due to injuries.

== Honours ==
Harlequins

- Premiership: 2020–2021

England U20

- World Rugby U20 Championship: 2014
- Six Nations Under 20s Championship: 2015
