= Harry Thacker =

English rugby union player

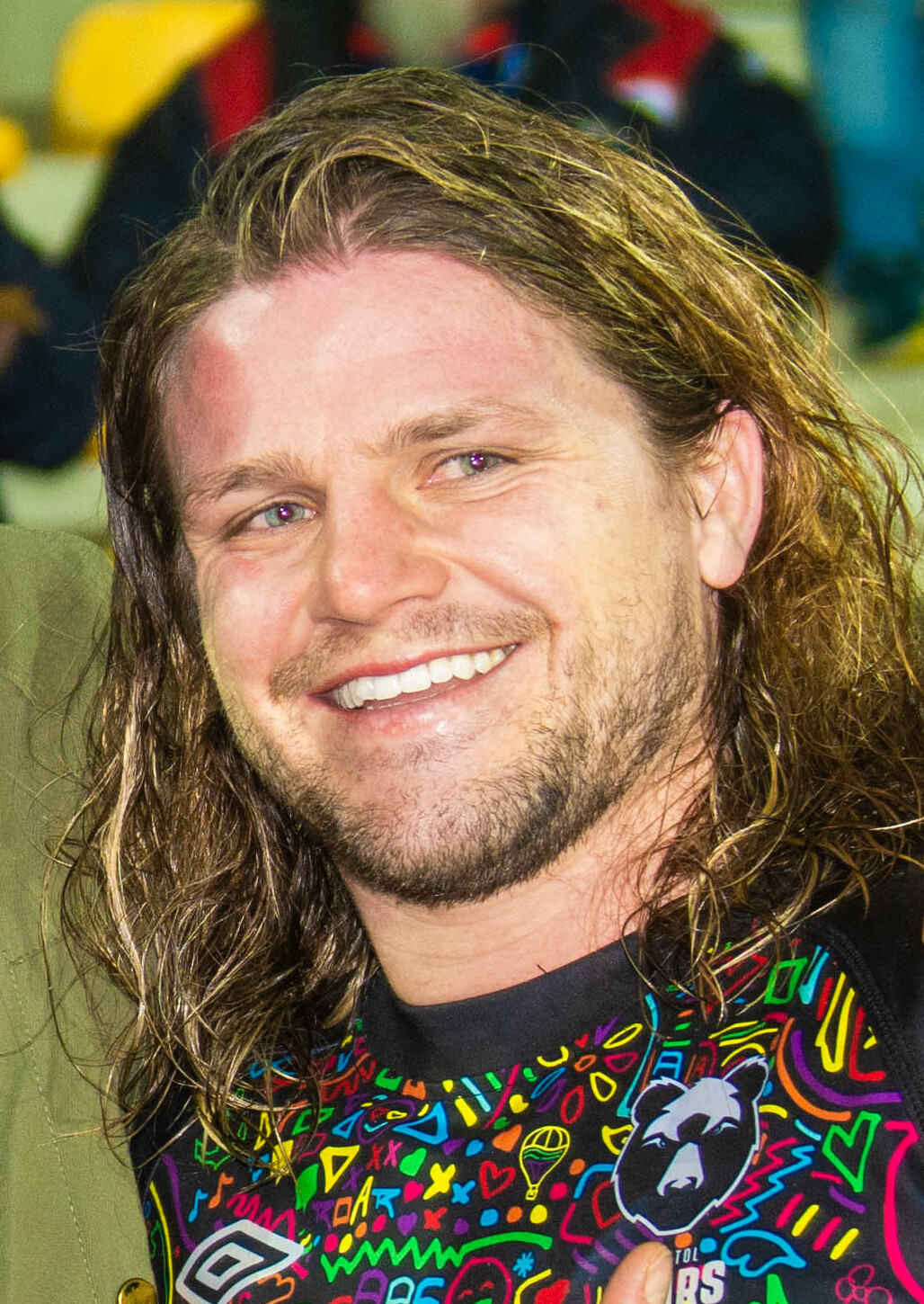
- Born: Harry Joseph Thacker; 18 February 1994 (age 32) Leicester, England
- Height: 1.74 m (5 ft 9 in)
- Weight: 96 kg (15 st 2 lb)
- School: Leicester Grammar School, Northumbria University
- Notable relative: Daniel Thacker (brother) Charlie Thacker (brother)

Rugby union career
- Position: Hooker/Flanker
- Current team: Bristol Bears
Senior career
Years	Team	Apps	(Points)
2013–2018	Leicester Tigers	70	(55)
2018–present	Bristol Bears	127	(300)
- Correct as of 14 March 2023
International career
Years	Team	Apps	(Points)
2014	England U-20	5	(20)

Harry Joseph Thacker (born 18 February 1994) is an English rugby union player who plays for Bristol Bears in Premiership Rugby. He plays as a hooker. Thacker made 70 appearances for Leicester Tigers between 2013–2018.

He has a younger brother, Charlie, who was in the Tigers development squad, and now plays for Nottingham in the RFU Championship.

On 20 January 2018, Thacker agreed to leave Leicester to join Bristol ahead of the 2018–19 season.
