= James Sheekey =

- Born: James Sheekey; 10 September 1994 (age 32)
- Height: 195 cm (6 ft 5 in)
- Weight: 107 kg (16 st 12 lb)

Rugby union career
- Position: Flanker/Number Eight
Senior career
Years	Team	Apps	(Points)
2017-2020	Dragons	7	(0)
- Correct as of 19:53, 9 June 2020 (UTC)
International career
Years	Team	Apps	(Points)
- Wales U20

James Sheekey (born 10 September 1994) is a Welsh rugby union player who plays as a Flanker or Number 8. He was a Wales under-20 international.

Sheekey made his debut for the Dragons regional team in 2017 having previously played for Cardiff Blues and Cardiff RFC. He was released by the Dragons at the end of the 2019-20 season.
