= Nick Tompkins =

Wales international rugby union player

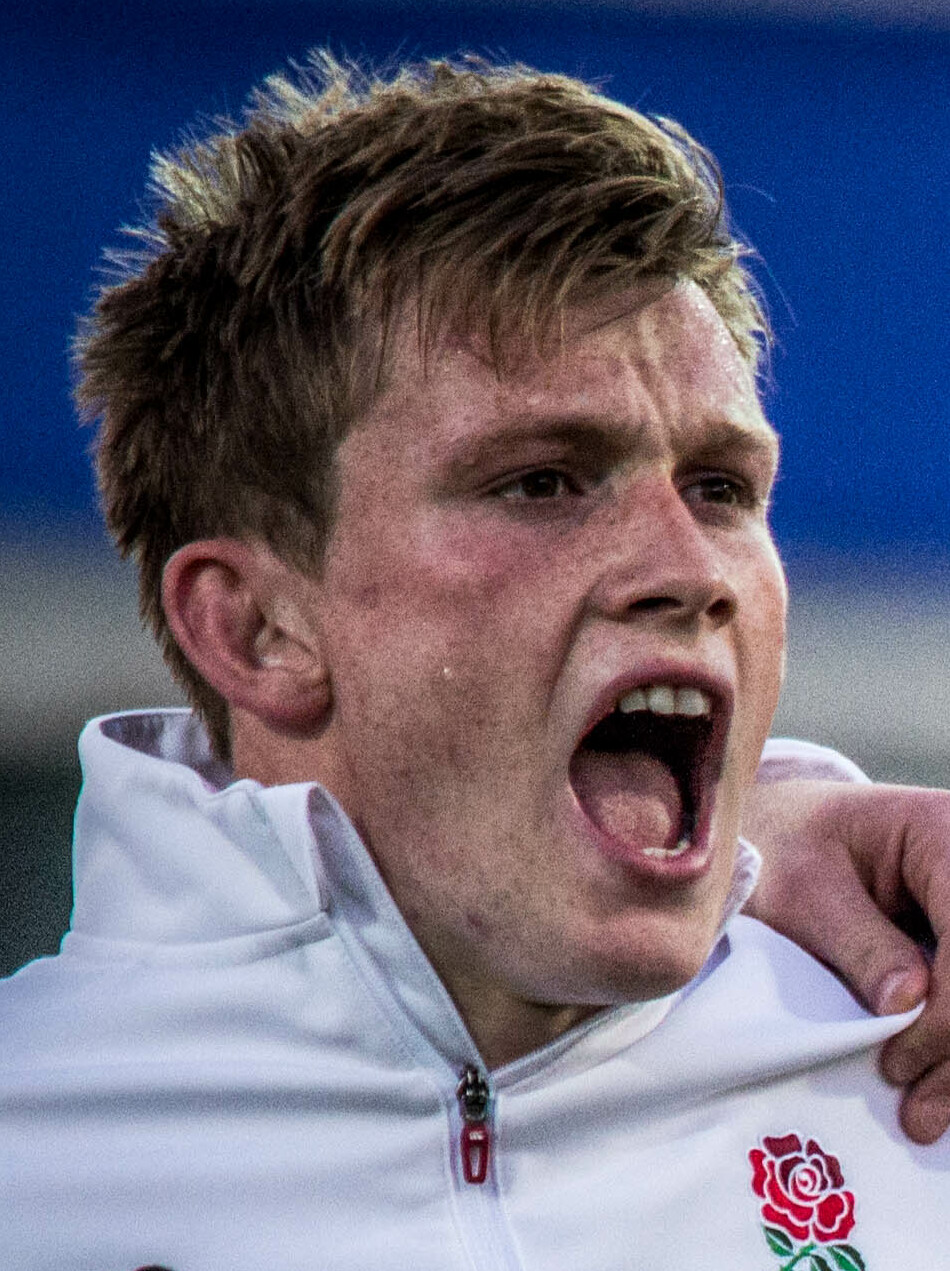
- Tompkins representing England during the World Rugby Under 20 Championship
- Full name: Nicholas Adam Tompkins
- Born: 16 February 1995 (age 31) Sidcup, England
- Height: 1.81 m (5 ft 11 in)
- Weight: 94 kg (207 lb; 14 st 11 lb)
- School: Bishop Justus Church of England School

Rugby union career
- Position: Centre
- Current team: Saracens
Senior career
| Years | Team | Apps | (Points) |
| 2012– | Saracens | 221 | (265) |
| 2020–2021 | → Dragons (loan) | 14 | (5) |
- Correct as of 13 August 2026
International career
| Years | Team | Apps | (Points) |
| 2014–2015 | England U20 | 17 | (15) |
| 2017 | England Saxons | 2 | (0) |
| 2020– | Wales | 43 | (25) |
- Correct as of 13 August 2026

Nicholas Adam Tompkins (born 16 February 1995) is a professional rugby union player who plays as a centre for Premiership Rugby club Saracens. Born in England, he represents Wales at international level after qualifying on ancestry grounds.

== Early life ==
Tompkins came through the academy at Saracens. Born in Sidcup, England, He represented England at Under-18 and Under-20 levels, as well as England Saxons. He qualifies for Wales through his Welsh grandmother, and made his debut for Wales in 2020.

== Club career ==
In 2012, Tompkins made his debut for Saracens in the LV Cup. His 100th Saracens match came in 2019, when he scored a hat-trick in 28 minutes against Gloucester in the Premiership Rugby semi-final. He was a replacement as Saracens won the 2018–19 Premiership final against Exeter Chiefs. He was also a replacement as Saracens won the 2019 European Rugby Champions Cup Final.

On 26 June 2020, Tompkins joined the Dragons on loan from Saracens for the 2020–21 season.

Tompkins started the final as Saracens defeated Sale Sharks to win the Premiership title in 2023.

Tompkins now has over 200 appearances for Saracens, having also won five Premiership titles and three Champions/Heineken cups.

== International career ==
Tompkins played for England at age group level and England Saxons.

In January 2020, Tompkins was selected for the senior Wales 2020 Six Nations squad. He qualifies for Wales through his Wrexham-born grandmother. On 1 February 2020, Tompkins made his international debut for Wales as a first-half injury replacement and scored a try in the 42–0 win over Italy.

== Career statistics ==
=== List of international tries ===
| No. | Date | Venue | Opponent | Score | Result | Competition |
|---|---|---|---|---|---|---|
| 1 | 1 February 2020 | Millennium Stadium, Cardiff, Wales | Italy | 26–0 | 42–0 | 2020 Six Nations Championship |
| 2 | 20 November 2021 | Millennium Stadium, Cardiff, Wales | Australia | 21–13 | 29–28 | 2021 end-of-year rugby union internationals |
| 3 | 26 February 2022 | Twickenham Stadium, London, England | England | 10–17 | 19–23 | 2022 Six Nations Championship |
| 4 | 24 September 2023 | Parc Olympique Lyonnais, Lyon, France | Australia | 24–6 | 40–6 | 2023 Rugby World Cup |

as of 24 September 2023
