= Billy Searle =

English rugby union player

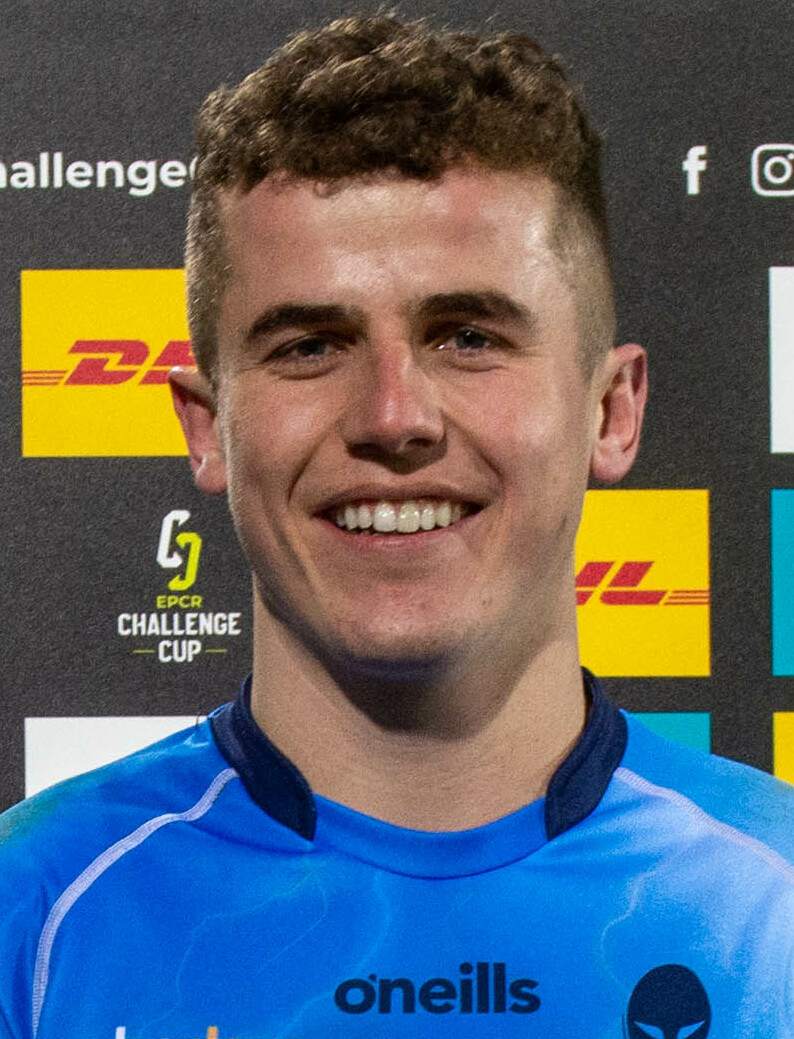
- Born: Billy George Searle; 25 March 1996 (age 30) Exeter, England
- Height: 5 ft 10 in (178 cm)
- Weight: 187 lb (85 kg)
- School: Okehampton College

Rugby union career
- Position: Fly half
- Current team: Leicester Tigers
Senior career
Years	Team	Apps	(Points)
2014–2015	Launceston	22	(43)
2015–2016	Plymouth Albion	27	(96)
2016–2018	Bristol	36	(138)
2018–2020	Wasps	21	(98)
2020–2022	Worcester Warriors	44	(197)
2022–2023	Bath	2	(5)
2022	Toulouse	4	(20)
2023–2024	Biarritz	19	(121)
2024–2025	Agen	22	(115)
2025–	Leicester Tigers	31	(257)
- Correct as of 26 October 2026
International career
Years	Team	Apps	(Points)
2015–2016	Cornwall	8	(32)
2026	England A	1	(15)
- Correct as of 7 February 2026

Billy George Searle (born 25 March 1996) is an English rugby union player for Leicester Tigers in Premiership Rugby. His most common position is fly-half. Searle has previously played for Wasps, Bristol Bears, Plymouth Albion, Launceston, Worcester Warriors and the Cornwall county side.

== Career ==
Searle started playing junior rugby at Okehampton whilst at school at Okehampton College. He left Okehampton to start his senior career at nearby Launceston in the fourth division (National League 2 South). After impressing for Cornwall in their 2015 County Championship win he moved onto third division side Plymouth Albion. After one season in Plymouth Searle moved up to Premiership side Bristol to join their academy.

On 11 May 2018 Wasps announced Searle would join them that summer.

On 8 January 2020, Searle signed for Premiership rivals Worcester Warriors from the 2020-21 season. He has since signed a contract extension until the end of the 2022–23 season.

On 5 October 2022 all Worcester players had their contacts terminated due to the liquidation of the company to which they were contracted.

In October 2022, Searle and former Worcester teammate Jamie Shillcock joined Bath on short-term loan.

On 4 July 2023, Searle was signed by French giants Toulouse as a medical joker during the 2023 Rugby World Cup. Following his release from Toulouse, he was signed by Biarritz in the second-tier Pro D2 competition for the 2023-24 season. On 6 June 2024, Searle would sign for French rivals Agen in the same competition for the 2024-25 season.

On 26 June 2025, Searle agreed a return to England to sign for the Premiership team Leicester Tigers from the 2025-26 season.

== Rugby union season-by-season playing stats ==
=== Club ===
Season	Club	Competition	Appearances	Tries	Drop Goals	Conversions	Penalties	Total Points
2014–15	Launceston	National League 2 South	22	6	0	5	1	43
2015–16	Plymouth Albion	National League 1	27	8	0	13	10	96
2016–17	Bristol	Premiership	12	0	0	2	8	28
2016–17	Bristol	Anglo-Welsh Cup	3	0	0	5	4	22
2016–17	Bristol	European Rugby Challenge Cup	5	1	0	5	2	21
2017–18	Bristol	RFU Championship	11	0	0	16	3	41
2017–18	Bristol	British and Irish Cup	5	2	0	8	0	26
2018–19	Wasps	Premiership						
2018–19	Wasps	Premiership Rugby Cup						
2018–19	Wasps	European Rugby Champions Cup						

=== County ===
Season	Side	Competition	Appearances	Tries	Drop Goals	Conversions	Penalties	Total Points
2014–15	Cornwall	Tamar Cup	1	1	0	2	0	9
2014–15	Cornwall	County Championship	4	0	0	0	1	3
2015–16	Cornwall	Tamar Cup	0	0	0	0	0	0
2015–16	Cornwall	County Championship	3	4	0	0	0	20

== Honours ==
Bristol

- RFU Championship champions: 2017–18

Cornwall

- Tamar Cup winners: 2015
- Bill Beaumont Cup winners: 2015

Leicester Tigers

- Premiership Rugby Cup winners:2026 Premiership Rugby Cup
