= Tom Whiteley =

English rugby union player

- Born: Tom Hector W. Whiteley; 17 December 1995 (age 30) Kensington, London, England
- Height: 5 ft 10 in (178 cm)
- Weight: 13 st 2 lb (184 lb; 83 kg)
- School: Millfield School

Rugby union career
- Position(s): Scrum-Half, Fly half
- Current team: Leicester Tigers
Senior career
Years	Team	Apps	(Points)
2014–2021	Saracens	59	(162)
2014–2015	→ Cambridge (loan)	2	(5)
2014–2015	→ Bishop's Stortford (loan)	8	(76)
2014–2015	→ Old Albanians (loan)	2	(0)
2015–2016	→ Rosslyn Park (loan)	19	(147)
2016–2017	→ Bedford Blues (loan)	10	(20)
2021–2023	Bristol Bears	15	(47)
2023–	Leicester Tigers	75	(53)
- Correct as of 1 November 2026

Tom Hector W. Whiteley (born 17 December 1995) is an English rugby union scrum-half for Leicester Tigers in Premiership Rugby. Whiteley was born in London to Justin and Juliette Whiteley, grandson of The Times journalist and academic, Philip Howard. Growing up in Clapham, South West London, he attended Wetherby Prep School before going to Millfield School. He has two older brothers and a younger sister.

Whiteley began playing rugby for Rosslyn Park's junior sides age 7, he went to Millfield School and played full back in academy sides for Bristol and Harlequins but was considered too small and released. He switched to scrum-half and after impressing at the Rosslyn Park 7s tournament signed a professional contract with Saracens.

After spending time on loan in the national leagues Whiteley made his first start for Saracens on 13 April 2019, scoring a try in a 23–21 defeat to Bristol Bears.

In January 2021, it was confirmed Whitley would join Bristol Bears ahead of the 2021–22 season. In January 2023, Whiteley joined Leicester Tigers; the move was originally set to be completed at the end of the 2022–23 season.
