= Tom Howe (rugby union) =

English rugby union player

- Born: Tom Howe; 3 June 1995 (age 31) Milton Keynes, England
- Height: 1.83 m (6 ft 0 in)
- Weight: 95 kg (14 st 13 lb)
- School: Shiplake College; Royal Grammar School, High Wycombe

Rugby union career
- Position: Wing
Amateur team(s)
Years	Team	Apps	(Points)
- Beaconsfield
Senior career
Years	Team	Apps	(Points)
2013–2017	Wasps	13	(10)
2015–2016	→ Jersey Reds (loan)	27	(70)
2017–2022	Worcester Warriors	55	(160)
2021	→ Coventry (loan)	5	(0)
2022–2023	Saracens	2	
2023-	Dorking		
- Correct as of 7 October 2022
International career
Years	Team	Apps	(Points)
2013	England U18		
2015	England U20	2	(5)
- Correct as of 30 June 2015
National sevens team
Years	Team		Comps
2014	England 7s		6
- Correct as of 20 September 2014

Tom Howe (born 3 June 1995) is an English rugby union player who plays on the wing.

Howe was part of Wasps academy system since joining from his local club Beaconsfield. He has represented all of England age-group levels where he was part England U20.

On 28 February 2017, Howe signed his first professional contract with Premiership rivals Worcester Warriors ahead of the 2017–18 season. On 5 October 2022 all Worcester players had their contacts terminated due to the liquidation of the company to which they were contracted.
