= James Fish =

English rugby union player

- Born: 15 July 1996 (age 30) Derby, England
- Height: 1.85 m (6 ft 1 in)
- Weight: 99 kg (15 st 8 lb)

Rugby union career
- Position: Hooker
- Current team: Bedford Blues
Senior career
Years	Team	Apps	(Points)
2014-	Northampton Saints	57	(35)
2014	→ Coventry	1	(0)
2014-2015	→ Loughborough Students	5	(0)
2015	→ Cambridge	5	(0)
2015	→ Ampthill	23	(0)
- Correct as of 3 April 2018

James Fish is a rugby union player currently playing for the Aviva Premiership side Northampton Saints.

Fish's rugby career started at Derby when he was eight years of age.

Brought into the Saints' Senior Academy in 2016, Fish has also represented England at Under-18s level and was named as part of the squad for their South Africa tour in 2014.

Breaking into the first team squad in the 2016/17 season, Fish made his debut against Newcastle Falcons in November before scoring twice during the Anglo-Welsh Cup fixture against Scarlets.

Most recently the hooker helped the Wanderers lift the 2017 Aviva 'A' League trophy, defeating Gloucester United in the final to claim the title.
