= Lloyd Evans (rugby union, born 1995) =

English rugby union player

- Born: Lloyd Arthur Evans; 14 December 1995 (age 30) Gloucester, England
- Height: 1.83 m (6 ft 0 in)
- Weight: 90 kg (14 st 2 lb)
- School: Dean Close School

Rugby union career
- Position(s): Fly-half, Fullback
Senior career
Years	Team	Apps	(Points)
2015–2024	Gloucester Rugby	94	(219)
2024–	Dragons	13	(58)
- Correct as of 22 May 2025
International career
Years	Team	Apps	(Points)
2013–2014	England U18s		
2014–2015	England U20s	5	(5)
- Correct as of 27 July 2024

Lloyd Evans (born 14 December 1995) is an English professional rugby union player who plays as fly-half and at fullback for Dragons.

== Career ==
=== Club ===
In November 2013 Evans made his senior debut for Gloucester in an Anglo-Welsh Cup game against Northampton Saints. In May 2015 he made his Premiership debut as a 60th minute replacement against Bath.

On 16 May 2017, Evans signed his first professional contract to remain with Gloucester at Kingsholm Stadium from the 2017–18 season.

On 5 July 2024, Evans signed for Welsh region Dragons in the United Rugby Championship after leaving his home club Gloucester.

=== International ===
Evans represented the England under-18 team. He was a member of the England under-20 squad at the 2015 World Rugby Under 20 Championship and played in pool matches against Japan and Wales. He featured as a replacement during the final as England finished runners up to New Zealand.

Evans also qualifies to represent Wales through his father Huw Evans a former chairman of Scarlets.
