= 2016–17 Premiership Rugby =

Rugby union competition in England

2016–17 Aviva Premiership
- Countries: England
- Date: 2 September 2016 – 27 May 2017
- Champions: Exeter Chiefs (1st title)
- Runners-up: Wasps
- Relegated: Bristol
- Matches played: 135
- Attendance: 2,033,805 (average 15,065 per match)
- Tries scored: 752 (average 5.6 per match)
- Top point scorer: Jimmy Gopperth (Wasps) (292 points)
- Top try scorer: Christian Wade (Wasps) (17 tries)

Official website
- www.premiershiprugby.com

The 2016–17 Aviva Premiership was the 30th season of the top flight English domestic rugby union competition and the seventh one to be sponsored by Aviva. The reigning champions entering the season were Saracens, who had claimed their third title after defeating Exeter Chiefs in the 2016 final. Bristol Bears had been promoted as champions from the 2015–16 RFU Championship after a seven-year absence.

The competition was broadcast by BT Sport for the fourth successive season. Highlights of each weekend's games were shown for the final time on ITV with extended highlights on BT Sport.

== Summary ==
Exeter Chiefs won their first title after defeating Wasps in the final at Twickenham after having finished second in the regular season table. Bristol Bears were relegated with two games of the season remaining. It was the fourth time that Bristol have been relegated from the top flight since the leagues began and the first time since the 2008–09 Premiership Rugby season.

As usual, round 1 included the London Double Header at Twickenham, the thirteenth instance since its inception in 2004.

== Teams ==
Twelve teams compete in the league – the top eleven teams from the previous season and Bristol Bears who were promoted from the 2015–16 RFU Championship after a top flight absence of seven years. They replaced London Irish who were relegated after twenty years in the top flight.

=== Stadiums and locations ===
2016–17 Aviva Premiership Teams

| Club | Director of Rugby/Head Coach | Captain | Stadium | Capacity | City/Area |
|---|---|---|---|---|---|
| Bath | (New Zealand) Todd Blackadder | (England) Guy Mercer | The Recreation Ground (Note: Bath will also play a home game at Twickenham Stadium on 8 April 2017) | 14,509 | Bath |
| Bristol Bears | (England) Mark Tainton | (Samoa) Jack Lam | Ashton Gate | 27,000 | Bristol |
| Exeter Chiefs | (England) Rob Baxter | (England) Jack Yeandle | Sandy Park | 12,600 | Exeter |
| Gloucester | (Ireland) David Humphreys | (Scotland) Greig Laidlaw | Kingsholm | 16,500 | Gloucester |
| Harlequins | (England) John Kingston | (England) Danny Care | Twickenham Stoop (Note: Harlequins will also play 2 home games at Twickenham Stadium on 3 September and 27 December 2016) | 14,816 | Twickenham, Greater London |
| Leicester Tigers | (Australia) Matt O'Connor | (England) Tom Youngs | Welford Road | 25,849 | Leicester |
| Newcastle Falcons | (England) Dean Richards | (England) Will Welch | Kingston Park | 10,200 | Newcastle upon Tyne |
| Northampton Saints | (England) Jim Mallinder | (England) Tom Wood | Franklin's Gardens (Note: Saints will also play a home game at Stadium MK on 16 April 2016) | 15,500 | Northampton |
| Sale Sharks | (England) Steve Diamond | (England) Josh Beaumont | AJ Bell Stadium | 12,000 | Salford, Greater Manchester |
| Saracens | (Ireland) Mark McCall | (England) Brad Barritt | Allianz Park (Note: Saracens will also play a home game at Twickenham Stadium on 3 September 2016 and a home game at Wembley Stadium on 8 April 2017) | 10,000 (Note: Allianz Park typically has a capacity of 10,000 but this can be raised to 15,000 with temporary seating) | Hendon, Greater London |
| Wasps | (Wales) Dai Young | (England) Joe Launchbury | Ricoh Arena | 32,609 | Coventry |
| Worcester Warriors | (South Africa) Gary Gold | (South Africa) GJ van Velze | Sixways Stadium | 12,024 | Worcester |

== Pre-season ==
The 2016 Singha Premiership Rugby Sevens was held in July and August. Once again, the four Welsh Regions contested as a group, alongside the twelve Premiership clubs, which were split into three groups. The top two sides from each group contested the series final at the Ricoh Arena on 6 August.

== Table ==
2016–17 Premiership Rugby Table
| Pos | Team | Pld | W | D | L | PF | PA | PD | TF | TA | TB | LB | Pts | Qualification or relegation |
|---|---|---|---|---|---|---|---|---|---|---|---|---|---|---|
| 1 | Wasps (RU) | 22 | 17 | 1 | 4 | 693 | 502 | +191 | 89 | 61 | 13 | 1 | 84 | Play-off place, Berth in the 2017–18 European Rugby Champions Cup |
| 2 | Exeter Chiefs (C) | 22 | 15 | 3 | 4 | 667 | 452 | +215 | 86 | 55 | 15 | 3 | 84 | Play-off place, Berth in the 2017–18 European Rugby Champions Cup |
| 3 | Saracens (SF) | 22 | 16 | 1 | 5 | 579 | 345 | +234 | 66 | 28 | 8 | 3 | 77 | Play-off place, Berth in the 2017–18 European Rugby Champions Cup |
| 4 | Leicester Tigers (SF) | 22 | 14 | 0 | 8 | 567 | 445 | +122 | 58 | 48 | 6 | 4 | 66 | Play-off place, Berth in the 2017–18 European Rugby Champions Cup |
| 5 | Bath | 22 | 12 | 0 | 10 | 486 | 440 | +46 | 52 | 49 | 5 | 6 | 59 | Berth in the 2017–18 European Rugby Champions Cup |
| 6 | Harlequins | 22 | 11 | 0 | 11 | 532 | 526 | +6 | 57 | 59 | 5 | 3 | 52 | Berth in the 2017–18 European Rugby Champions Cup |
| 7 | Northampton Saints | 22 | 10 | 0 | 12 | 476 | 490 | −14 | 52 | 50 | 5 | 7 | 52 | Play-off for 2017–18 European Rugby Champions Cup |
| 8 | Newcastle Falcons | 22 | 10 | 0 | 12 | 430 | 581 | −151 | 51 | 73 | 5 | 4 | 49 | 2017–18 European Rugby Challenge Cup |
| 9 | Gloucester | 22 | 7 | 2 | 13 | 533 | 537 | −4 | 61 | 64 | 6 | 8 | 46 | 2017–18 European Rugby Challenge Cup |
| 10 | Sale Sharks | 22 | 7 | 1 | 14 | 471 | 595 | −124 | 55 | 70 | 6 | 4 | 40 | 2017–18 European Rugby Challenge Cup |
| 11 | Worcester Warriors | 22 | 5 | 2 | 15 | 466 | 662 | −196 | 56 | 74 | 5 | 4 | 33 | 2017–18 European Rugby Challenge Cup |
| 12 | Bristol (Note: The champion of the Championship (London Irish) are eligible for promotion) (R) | 22 | 3 | 0 | 19 | 382 | 707 | −325 | 42 | 94 | 2 | 6 | 20 | Relegated |

Source: Premiership Rugby
Rules for classification: Tiebreakers for teams tied on points: 1) Number of matches won; 2) Difference between points for and against; 3) Total number of points for; 4) Aggregate number of points scored in matches between tied teams; 5) Number of matches won excluding the first match, then the second and so on until the tie is settled
(C) Champions; (RU) Runners-up; (SF) Losing semi-finalists; (R) Relegated

== Regular season ==
Fixtures for the season were announced by Premiership Rugby on 7 July 2016. As is the norm, round 1 included the London Double Header at Twickenham. For the first time since its 2004 inception, the Double Header involved only two of the original London teams – Harlequins and Saracens – with London Irish having been relegated to the Championship for 2016–17 and Wasps no longer being based near London. Unlike the previous year, no games were scheduled to take place abroad.

=== Round 1 ===
2 September 2016
19:45

| (2 BP) Gloucester | 31–38 | Leicester Tigers (1 BP) |
| Try: Scott (2) 12' c, 24' c Sharples 22' c Purdy 44' c Con: Laidlaw (4/4) 12', 22', 34', 44'; Pen: Laidlaw (1/1) 27' | Report | Try: M. Tuilagi 16' c Pietersen 47' c Harrison (2) 56' c, 80' c O'Connor 76' c Con: F. Burns (3/3) 16', 47', 56'; Harrison (2/2) 76', 80'; Pen: F. Burns (1/1) 62' |

Kingsholm
Attendance: 14,298
Referee: Wayne Barnes

2 September 2016
20:00

| Newcastle Falcons | 19–17 | Sale Sharks (1 BP) |
| Try: Sinoti 36' c Con: Delany (1/1) 36'; Pen: Delany (4/5) 7', 45', 53', 56' | Report | Try: Leota 47' c McGuigan 70' c Con: Mugford (2/2) 47', 70'; Pen: MacGinty (1/2) 21' |

Kingston Park
Attendance: 5,523
Referee: Greg Garner

3 September 2016
14:00

| (1 BP) Saracens | 35–3 | Worcester Warriors |
| Try: George 44' c Lozowski 53' c Burger 56' c Spencer 78' m Con: Lozowski (3/4) 44', 53' 56'; Pen: Lozowski (3/5) 15', 40', 42' | Report | Pen: Lamb (1/1) 25' |

Twickenham
Attendance: 47,029
Referee: Matthew Carley

3 September 2016
15:30

| (1 BP) Northampton Saints | 14–18 | Bath |
| Try: Groom (2) 73', 77'; Con: Myler (2/2) 73', 77' | Report | Pen: Ford (4/4) 45', 64', 70', 76'; Drop: Ford (2/3) 33', 37' |

Franklin's Gardens
Attendance: 14,987
Referee: JP Doyle

3 September 2016
16:30

| Harlequins | 21–19 | Bristol (1 BP) |
| Try: Yarde 39 'm Marchant 41' c Con: N. Evans (1/2) 41'; Pen: N. Evans (3/3) 24', 58', 65' | Report | Try: Varndell 21' c T. Pisi 27' c Edwards 42' m Con: Henson (2/2) 21', 27' |

Twickenham
Attendance: 47,029
Referee: Luke Pearce

4 September 2016
15:00

| Wasps | 25–20 | Exeter Chiefs (1 BP) |
| Try: Gopperth 32' m Robson 53' c Taylor 64' c Con: Gopperth (2/3) 53', 64'; Pen: Gopperth (2/2) 18', 79' | Report | Try: Waldrom 4' c Chudley 35' c Con: Slade (2/2) 4', 35'; Pen: Slade (2/3) 14', 51' |

Ricoh Arena
Attendance: 13,555
Referee: Tom Foley

=== Round 2 ===
9 September 2016
19:45

| Worcester Warriors | 23–23 | Gloucester |
| Try: Te'o 22' m Vuna 31' c Humphreys 57' m Con: Lamb (1/3) 31'; Pen: Lamb (1/2) 37'; Heathcote (1/1) 69' | Report | Try: Scott 62' c Purdy 70' c Con: Laidlaw (2/2) 62', 70'; Pen: Laidlaw (3/3) 3', 26', 72' |

Sixways
Attendance: 8,905
Referee: Luke Pearce

9 September 2016
20:15

| Sale Sharks | 19–10 | Harlequins |
| Try: Seymour 51' c Con: Mugford (1/1) 51'; Pen: Mugford (4/4) 6', 15', 21', 57' | Report | Try: Robshaw 26'; Con: N. Evans (1/1) 26'; Pen: N. Evans (1/1) 55' |

AJ Bell Stadium
Attendance: 6,217
Referee: Tom Foley

10 September 2016
15:00

| (1 BP) Bath | 58–5 | Newcastle Falcons |
| Try: Penalty try 29' c Banahan 31'; Rokoduguni (2) 35' c, 40' c Palma-Newport 45' c Attwood (2) 50' m, 65' c Stooke 80' c Con: Ford (6/8) 29', 31', 35', 45', 65', 80'; Pen: Ford (1/2) 13'; Drop: Ford (1/1) 21' | Report | Try: Hogg 76' m |

Recreation Ground
Attendance: 12,412
Referee: Ian Tempest

10 September 2016
15:00

| Leicester Tigers | 22–34 | Wasps (1 BP) |
| Try: McCaffrey 30' m Slater 48' m Pen: F. Burns (4/5) 20', 52', 55', 63' | Report | Try: Wade 25' c Thompson 41' c Jones 45' c Gopperth 80' c Con: Gopperth (4/4) 25', 41', 45', 80'; Pen: Gopperth (2/5) 3', 22' |

Welford Road
Attendance: 24,088
Referee: Greg Garner

11 September 2016
16:30

| Bristol | 10–32 | Northampton Saints (1 BP) |
| Try: McMillan 51' c Con: T. Pisi (1/1) 51'; Pen: T. Pisi (1/1) 14' | Report | Try: North 9' m Picamoles 16' c K. Pisi 22' c Haywood 80' c Con: Myler (2/3) 16', 22'; Mallinder (1/1) 80'; Pen: Myler (2/4) 5', 20' |

Ashton Gate
Attendance: 11,322
Referee: Craig Maxwell-Keys

11 September 2016
15:00

| Exeter Chiefs | 13–34 | Saracens (1 BP) |
| Try: Cowan-Dickie 69'; Con: Steenson (1/1) 69'; Pen: Slade (2/3) 29', 33' | Report | Try: Lozowski 5' c Maitland (2) 18' m, 58' c Wray 62' m Spencer 80 'c Con: Goode (3/5) 5', 58', 80'; Pen: Goode (1/2) 54' |

Sandy Park
Attendance: 10,322
Referee: JP Doyle

=== Round 3 ===
16 September 2016
19:45

| Sale Sharks | 13–26 | Gloucester |
| Try: James 13' m Neild 55' m Pen: Addison (1/1) 55' | Report | Try: Afoa 9' c Sharples 39' c Con: Laidlaw (2/2) 9', 39'; Pen: Laidlaw (4/4) 16', 65', 67', 75' |

AJ Bell Stadium
Attendance: 5,902
Referee: Ian Tempest

17 September 2016
15:00

| (1 BP) Bath | 37–22 | Worcester Warriors |
| Try: A. Watson 47' c Banahan 54' c Rokoduguni 62' c Houston 70' c Con: Ford (4/4) 47', 54', 62', 70'; Pen: Ford (3/3) 27', 40', 60' | Report | Try: Annett 17' c Hammond 31' c Humphreys 65' m Con: Heathcote (2/3) 17', 31'; Pen: Heathcote (1/1) 38' |

Recreation Ground
Attendance: 13,184
Referee: Craig Maxwell-Keys

17 September 2016
15:00

| (1 BP) Exeter Chiefs | 36–25 | Harlequins |
| Try: Turner (2) 7' m, 20' c Cowan-Dickie (3) 17' c, 35' c, 46' c Con: Steenson (4/5) 17', 20', 35', 46'; Pen: Steenson (1/1) 40' | Report | Try: Buchanan 26' c Care 66' c Walker 72' m Con: Swiel (2/3) 26', 66'; Pen: Swiel (2/2) 10', 12' |

Sandy Park
Attendance: 9,391
Referee: Matthew Carley

17 September 2016
15:00

| Saracens | 27–12 | Northampton Saints |
| Try: George 56' m Penalty try 67' c Con: Lozowski (1/2) 67'; Pen: Lozowski (5/5) 10', 17', 38', 72', 77' | Report | Pen: Myler (4/4) 5', 24', 31', 51' |

Allianz Park
Attendance: 9,455
Referee: Greg Garner

18 September 2016
14:30

| (1 BP) Wasps | 70–22 | Bristol |
| Try: Taylor 1' m Daly (2) 21' m, 73' c Cooper-Woolley 24' c Symons 35' c Wade (2) 37' c, 47' c Johnson (2) 50' c, 66' c Cipriani 55' m Con: Gopperth (7/10) 24', 35', 37', 47', 50', 66', 73'; Pen: Gopperth (2/2) 15', 20' | Report | Try: Lam 43' m Eadie 58' c Cortes 71' c Con: T. Pisi (1/1) 58'; Jarvis (1/1) 71'; Pen: T. Pisi (1/1) 13' |

Ricoh Arena
Attendance: 12,280
Referee: Tim Wigglesworth

18 September 2016
15:00

| (1 BP) Newcastle Falcons | 13–14 | Leicester Tigers |
| Try: Socino 5' c Con: Delany (1/1) 5'; Pen: Delany (1/1) 16'; Hodgson (1/1) 70' | Report | Try: Fitzgerald 21' m Pen: F. Burns (3/3) 27', 49', 67' |

Kingston Park
Attendance: 6,570
Referee: JP Doyle

=== Round 4 ===
23 September 2016
19:45

| Bristol | 17–41 | Exeter Chiefs (1 BP) |
| Try: Williams 21' m McMillan 53' m Crumpton 70' c Con: Williams (1/3) 70' | Report | Try: Woodburn (2) 2' c, 18' c Waldrom (2) 32' c, 43' c S. Hill 79' c Con: Steenson (5/5) 2', 18', 32', 43', 79'; Pen: Steenson (2/2) 28', 60' |

Ashton Gate
Attendance: 15,065
Referee: Tom Foley

24 September 2016
15:00

| (1 BP) Gloucester | 13–18 | Newcastle Falcons |
| Try: Moriarty 12' c Con: B. Burns (1/1) 12'; Pen: B. Burns (1/1) 22'; Laidlaw (1/1) 73' | Report | Try: Waldouck 9' c A. Tait 65' m Con: Delany (1/2) 9'; Pen: Delany (2/2) 36', 58' |

Kingsholm
Attendance: 12,050
Referee: David Sainsbury

24 September 2016
15:00

| Harlequins | 17–10 | Saracens (1 BP) |
| Try: Visser 4' c Walker 19' c Con: Swiel (2/2) 4', 19'; Pen: Swiel (1/1) 3' | Report | Try: Wigglesworth 41' c Con: Lozowski (1/1) 41'; Pen: Spencer (1/1) 76' |

Twickenham Stoop
Attendance: 14,800
Referee: Craig Maxwell-Keys

24 September 2016
15:00

| (1 BP) Northampton Saints | 15–20 | Wasps |
| Try: North 2' m Kessell 75' c Con: Myler (1/2) 75'; Pen: Myler (1/1) 80' | Report | Try: Gopperth 20' c Bassett 78' c Con: Gopperth (2/2) 20', 78'; Pen: Gopperth (2/2) 32', 57' |

Franklin's Gardens
Attendance: 14,477
Referee: Luke Pearce

24 September 2016
15:00

| (1 BP) Worcester Warriors | 34–34 | Sale Sharks (1 BP) |
| Try: Shillcock (2) 17' m, 52' m Arr 28' c Humphreys 37' c Olivier 42' c Con: Lamb (3/5) 28', 37', 42'; Pen: Lamb (1/1) 73' | Report | Try: Addison (2) 2' c, 19' c Briggs 67' c Aulika 76' c Con: MacGinty (4/4) 2', 19', 67', 76'; Pen: MacGinty (2/2) 15', 58' |

Sixways
Attendance: 6,136
Referee: JP Doyle

25 September 2016
15:00

| Leicester Tigers | 34–14 | Bath |
| Try: O'Connor 15' m T. Youngs 48' c Slater 78' c Con: O. Williams (1/1) 48'; F. Burns (1/1) 78'; Pen: O. Williams (5/5) 6', 21', 40', 60', 62' | Report | Try: Rokoduguni 23' c Dunn 68' c Con: Ford (2/2) 23', 68' |

Welford Road
Attendance: 20,134
Referee: Matthew Carley

=== Round 5 ===
30 September 2016
19:45

| Bristol | 0–39 | Saracens (1 BP) |
| | Report | Try: Lozowski (2) 13' c, 46' c Wyles 60' c George 71' m Kruis 79' c Con: Spencer (2/2) 13', 46'; Lozowski (2/3) 60', 79'; Pen: Spencer (2/2) 22', 43' |

Ashton Gate
Attendance: 11,592
Referee: Ian Tempest

30 September 2016
19:45

| Northampton Saints | 20–19 | Exeter Chiefs (1 BP) |
| Try: North 23' c Hutchinson 25' c Con: Mallinder (2/2) 23', 25'; Pen: Mallinder (2/2) 68', 78' | Report | Try: Woodburn 10' c Con: Steenson (1/1) 10'; Pen: Steenson (4/4) 6', 16', 54', 66' |

Franklin's Gardens
Attendance: 13,901
Referee: Matthew Carley

1 October 2016
14:30

| (1 BP) Sale Sharks | 34–30 | Leicester Tigers (1 BP) |
| Try: Phillips 6' c Odogwu 24' c Leota 31' c Aulika 57' c Con: Addison (4/4) 6', 24', 31', 57'; Pen: Addison (2/2) 19', 76' | Report | Try: Betham (2) 10' c, 13' c Thompstone 68' c Con: O. Williams (3/3) 10', 13', 68'; Pen: O. Williams (3/3) 17', 33', 48' |

AJ Bell Stadium
Attendance: 7,509
Referee: Craig Maxwell-Keys

1 October 2016
15:00

| Gloucester | 6–15 | Bath |
| Pen: Hook (1/1) 30'; Laidlaw (1/1) 48' | Report | Try: A. Watson 61' m Banahan 73' c Con: Ford (1/2) 73'; Drop: Ford (1/1) 46' |

Kingsholm
Attendance: 16,115
Referee: JP Doyle

2 October 2016
14:30

| (1 BP) Wasps | 47–18 | Harlequins |
| Try: Johnson 4' m Thompson 21' c Robson 27' c Daly 33' c Wade 58' c Eastmond 66' c Bassett 75' c Con: Gopperth (6/7) 21', 27', 33', 58', 66', 75' | Report | Try: Jm. Roberts 19' m Chisholm 38' c Con: Swiel (1/2) 38'; Pen: Swiel (2/2) 25', 32' |

Ricoh Arena
Attendance: 16,004
Referee: Greg Garner

2 October 2016
15:00

| Worcester Warriors | 11–9 | Newcastle Falcons (1 BP) |
| Try: Olivier 17' m Pen: Heathcote (1/1) 40'; Lamb (1/1) 53' | Report | Pen: Delany (2/2) 23', 62'; J. Hodgson (1/1) 76' |

Sixways
Attendance: 6,375
Referee: Tom Foley

=== Round 6 ===
7 October 2016
19:45

| Bath | 30–3 | Sale Sharks |
| Try: Banahan 3' c Fotuali'i 61' c Palma-Newport 66' c Con: Ford (3/3) 3', 61', 66'; Pen: Ford (3/3) 38', 47', 57' | Report | Pen: Addison (1/1) 15' |

Recreation Ground
Attendance: 13,918
Referee: Tom Foley

8 October 2016
15:00

| (1 BP) Exeter Chiefs | 27–27 | Gloucester |
| Try: Waldrom 24' c Whitten (2) 31' c, 69' m Welch 80' m Con: Steenson (2/4) 24', 31'; Pen: Steenson (1/1) 73' | Report | Try: Scott 12' c Sharples 26' c Morgan 58' c Con: Laidlaw (3/3) 12', 26', 58'; Pen: Twelvetrees (1/1) 38'; Laidlaw (1/1) 51' |

Sandy Park
Attendance: 11,394
Referee: Greg Garner

8 October 2016
15:00

| Harlequins | 20–9 | Northampton Saints |
| Try: Alofa 11' m Pen: N. Evans (1/1) 7'; Swiel (3/3) 47', 60', 72' | Report | Pen: Myler (3/3) 18', 24', 66' |

Twickenham Stoop
Attendance: 14,800
Referee: Ian Tempest

8 October 2016
15:00

| (1 BP) Leicester Tigers | 34–13 | Worcester Warriors |
| Try: Brady 23' c Veainu 32' c Mulipola 64' c Kitchener 76' c Con: O. Williams (4/4) 23', 32', 64', 76'; Pen: O. Williams (2/2) 9', 16' | Report | Try: Bregvadze 68' c Con: Lamb (1/1) 68'; Pen: Lamb (2/2) 44', 50' |

Welford Road
Attendance: 20,854
Referee: Tim Wigglesworth

8 October 2016
15:00

| Newcastle Falcons | 19–14 | Bristol (1 BP) |
| Try: Socino 5' c Welch 15' m J. Hogdson 32' c Con: Delany (2/3) 5', 32' | Report | Try: Fisher 51' c Eadie 62' c Con: Jarvis (2/2) 51', 62' |

Kingston Park
Attendance: 6,134
Referee: Wayne Barnes

9 October 2016
15:00

| (1 BP) Saracens | 30–14 | Wasps |
| Try: M. Vunipola 4' m Ellery 40' m George (2) 69' c, 74' c Con: Lozowski (1/1) 69'; Spencer (1/1) 74'; Pen: Lozowski (2/2) 32', 55' | Report | Try: Bassett 37' m Pen: Gopperth (3/3) 28', 48', 67' |

Allianz Park
Attendance: 9,911
Referee: Matthew Carley

=== Round 7 ===
28 October 2016
19:45

| Northampton Saints | 23–20 | (1 BP) Gloucester |
| Try: Picamoles 25' c Kessell 68' c Con: Myler (2/2) 26', 69'; Pen: Myler (3/3) 29', 36', 51' | Report | Try: Rowan 45' c Sharples 57' c Con: Laidlaw (2/2); Pen: Laidlaw (1/3) 33'; Hook (0/1) |

Franklin's Gardens
Attendance: 14,274
Referee: Tom Foley

29 October 2016
15:00

| (1 BP) Harlequins | 36–14 | Worcester Warriors |
| Try: Care 3' c Horwill 43' c Brown 48' c Marchant 64' m Visser 80' c Con: N. Evans (3/4) 4', 44', 49'; Swiel 80'; Pen: N. Evans (1/1) 63' | Report | Try: Willison 9'c Te'o 50' c Con: Shillcock (2/2) 10', 51'; Drop: Lamb (0/1) |

Twickenham Stoop
Attendance: 14,816
Referee: Luke Pearce

29 October 2016
15:00

| Saracens | 24–10 | Leicester Tigers |
| Try: Wyles 7' c Maitland 23' c B. Vunipola 43' c Con: Farrell (3/3) 8', 24', 45'; Pen: Farrell (1/2) 19' | Report | Try: Catchpole 65' c Con: O. Williams (1/1) 67'; Pen: O. Williams (1/1) 13' |

Allianz Park
Attendance: 9,734
Referee: Wayne Barnes

30 October 2016
14:30

| (1 BP) Wasps | 31–6 | Newcastle Falcons |
| Try: Penalty try 17' c Halai 19' c Gopperth (2) 69' c, 80' c Con: Gopperth (4/4) 17', 19', 69', 80'; Pen: Gopperth (1/1) 15' | Report | Pen: Delany (2/2) 41', 51' |

Ricoh Arena
Attendance: 15,033
Referee: Craig Maxwell-Keys

30 October 2016
15:00

| Bristol | 13–31 | Sale Sharks (1 BP) |
| Try: Lemi 80' c Con: Geraghty (1/1) 80'; Pen: Geraghty (2/2) 48', 56' | Report | Try: Odogwu 18' m Haley 25' c McGuigan 44' m Lewis-Roberts 67' c T. Curry 74' c Con: McGuigan (2/4) 25', 67'; Mugford (1/1) 74' |

Ashton Gate
Attendance: 14,025
Referee: JP Doyle

30 October 2016
15:00

| (1 BP) Exeter Chiefs | 10–13 | Bath |
| Try: Lees 70' c Con: Steenson (1/1) 70'; Pen: Steenson (1/1) 16' | Report | Try: Rokoduguni 80' c Con: Ford (1/1) 80'; Pen: Ford (2/2) 44', 66' |

Sandy Park
Attendance: 12,284
Referee: Ian Tempest

=== Round 8 ===
18 November 2016
19:45

| Bath | 16–9 | Bristol (1 BP) |
| Try: J. Wilson 27' c Con: Homer (1/1) 27'; Pen: Homer (3/3) 19', 39', 51' | Report | Pen: Searle (3/3) 21', 35', 40' |

Recreation Ground
Attendance: 14,241
Referee: Ian Tempest

18 November 2016
19:45

| (1 BP) Worcester Warriors | 17–18 | Northampton Saints |
| Try: Hammond 11' c Heem 79' c Con: Shillcock (2/2) 11', 79'; Pen: Shillcock (1/1) 3' | Report | Pen: Myler (6/6) 9', 33', 39', 46', 51' 75' |

Sixways
Attendance: 8,156
Referee: Greg MacDonald

18 November 2016
20:00

| Newcastle Falcons | 19–32 | Exeter Chiefs (1 BP) |
| Try: Lawson 27' m A. Tait 57' m Pen: Delany (3/3) 13', 46', 67' | Report | Try: Devoto 3' c Waldrom 34' c Short 61' c Chudley 78' m Con: Steenson (3/4) 3', 34', 61'; Pen: Steenson (2/2) 43', 56' |

Kingston Park
Attendance: 8,061
Referee: Tim Wigglesworth

19 November 2016
15:00

| (1 BP) Gloucester | 36–18 | Wasps |
| Try: Hibbard 20' c Atkinson 58' c Scott 62' c Sharples 77' m Purdy 79' c Con: Hook (4/5) 20', 58', 62', 79'; Pen: Hook (1/1) 6' | Report | Try: Young (2) 11' m, 75' c Con: Gopperth (1/2) 75'; Pen: Gopperth (2/2) 47', 54' |

Kingsholm
Attendance: 12,772
Referee: Dean Richards

20 November 2016
13:00

| Sale Sharks | 13–28 | Saracens |
| Try: Beaumont 22' c Con: MacGinty (1/1) 22'; Pen: MacGinty (2/2) 51', 64' | Report | Try: Bosch 27' c Gallagher 44' m Spencer 71' c Con: Lozowski (2/3) 27', 71'; Pen: Lozowski (3/3) 5', 40', 55' |

AJ Bell Stadium
Attendance: 8,828
Referee: Andrew Jackson

20 November 2016
15:00

| Leicester Tigers | 25–6 | Harlequins |
| Try: O. Williams 54' c Con: F. Burns (1/1) 54'; Pen: F. Burns (5/5) 17', 21', 35', 45', 63'; Drop: F. Burns (1/1) 49' | Report | Pen: N. Evans (2/2) 11', 24' |

Welford Road
Attendance: 25,849
Referee: Craig Maxwell-Keys

=== Round 9 ===
25 November 2016
19:45

| (1 BP) Bristol | 16–21 | Leicester Tigers |
| Try: Hawkins 63' c Con: Jarvis (1/1) 63'; Pen: Searle (2/2) 11', 32'; Jarvis (1/1) 77' | Report | Try: Thompstone 36' m Genge 48' c Con: F. Burns (1/2) 48'; Pen: F. Burns (3/3) 19', 25', 53' |

Ashton Gate
Attendance: 13,531
Referee: Tim Wigglesworth

25 November 2016
19:45

| (1 BP) Northampton Saints | 16–22 | Newcastle Falcons |
| Try: Day 44' c Con: Myler (1/1) 44'; Pen: Myler (3/3) 18', 53', 71' | Report | Try: Hodgson 4' m Witty 64' c Goneva 75' c Con: Hodgson (2/3) 64', 75'; Pen: Hodgson (1/1) 38' |

Franklin's Gardens
Attendance: 13,734
Referee: Andrew Jackson

26 November 2016
16:30

| (1 BP) Exeter Chiefs | 57–22 | Worcester Warriors |
| Try: Yeandle 11' c Chudley 22' c Penalty try 32' c Woodburn 44' c Rimmer 50' c Waldrom 55' c Short 61' m Whitten 71' c Con: Steenson (6/6) 11', 22', 32', 44', 50', 55'; Simmonds (1/2) 71'; Pen: Steenson (1/1) 15' | Report | Try: Adams 58' c Olivier 68' c Potgieter 76' m Con: Shillcock (2/3) 58', 68'; Pen: Shillcock (1/1) 27' |

Sandy Park
Attendance: 11,055
Referee: Matthew O’Grady

27 November 2016
13:00

| Saracens | 24–20 | Gloucester (1 BP) |
| Try: Barritt 11' c Ellery 17' m Con: Lozowski (1/2) 11'; Pen: Lozowski (4/4) 22', 57', 64', 75' | Report | Try: Morgan 1' c B. Burns 15' c Con: Hook (2/2) 1', 15'; Pen: Hook (2/2) 28', 71' |

Allianz Park
Attendance: 7,982
Referee: Greg MacDonald

27 November 2016
14:30

| (1 BP) Wasps | 34–24 | Sale Sharks |
| Try: Cipriani 11' c Johnson (2) 24' c, 35' m Miller (2) 62' c, 64' m Con: Gopperth (3/5) 11', 24, 62'; Pen: Gopperth (1/1) 17' | Report | Try: B. Evans (2) 42' c, 66' c Haley 77' c Con: MacGinty (2/2) 42', 66'; Arscott (1/1) 77'; Pen: MacGinty (1/1) 9' |

Ricoh Arena
Attendance: 12,329
Referee: Tom Foley

27 November 2016
15:00

| Harlequins | 21–20 | Bath (1 BP) |
| Try: Visser 3' m Dickson 60' c Con: Swiel (1/2) 60'; Pen: Swiel (3/3) 28', 34', 75' | Report | Try: Palma-Newport 36' c Catt 67' c Con: Homer (2/2) 36', 67'; Pen: Homer (2/2) 20', 45' |

Twickenham Stoop
Attendance: 14,816
Referee: Dean Richards

=== Round 10 ===
2 December 2016
19:45

| Sale Sharks | 3–21 | Exeter Chiefs |
| Pen: MacGinty (1/1) 11' | Report | Try: Penalty try 11' c Short 19' c Chudley 34' c Con: Steenson (3/3) 11', 19', 34' |

AJ Bell Stadium
Attendance: 4,479
Referee: Wayne Barnes

3 December 2016
12:15

| Bath | 14–11 | Saracens (1 BP) |
| Try: Clark 24' m Pen: Homer (3/3) 5', 20', 50' | Report | Try: Maitland 37' m Pen: Lozowski (1/1) 18'; Drop: Lozowski (1/1) 46' |

Recreation Ground
Attendance: 14,509
Referee: Greg Garner

3 December 2016
16:30

| (1 BP) Gloucester | 26–18 | Bristol |
| Try: Scott 42' c Heinz 49' c Penalty Try 57' c Purdy 68' m Con: Hook (3/4) 42', 49', 58' | Report | Try: Wallace 79' m Arscott 80' c Con: Woodward (1/2) 80'; Pen: Woodward (2/2) 8', 17' |

Kingsholm
Attendance: 14,340
Referee: Matthew Carley

3 December 2016
17:00

| Leicester Tigers | 19–11 | Northampton Saints |
| Try: Thompstone 12' c Con: F. Burns (1/1) 12'; Pen: F. Burns (3/3) 7', 29', 68'; O. Williams (1/1) 80' | Report | Try: Haywood 17' m Pen: Myler (2/2) 25', 40' |

Welford Road
Attendance: 24,808
Referee: JP Doyle

4 December 2016
15:00

| (1 BP) Newcastle Falcons | 38–32 | Harlequins (2 BP) |
| Try: Young 12' c Socino (2) 28' c, 42' m Wilson 31' c Olmstead 64' m M. Watson 76' c Con: J. Hodgson (3/4) 13', 29', 32'; Delaney (1/2) 77' | Report | Try: Buchanan 18' m Dickson (2) 51' c, 59' c Visser 80' c Con: Jackson (3/4) 52', 60', 80'; Pen: Swiel (1/1) 7'; Jackson (1/1) 74' |

Kingston Park
Attendance: 6,054
Referee: Ian Tempest

4 December 2016
15:00

| Worcester Warriors | 12–26 | Wasps |
| Pen: Shillcock (4/4) 4', 11', 24', 33' | Report | Try: Macken 1' c Robson 44' c Con: Miller (2/2) 1', 44'; Pen: Miller (4/4) 7', 29', 31', 38' |

Sixways
Attendance: 8,027
Referee: Craig Maxwell-Keys

=== Round 11 ===
23 December 2016
19:45

| Northampton Saints | 24–5 | Sale Sharks |
| Try: Foden 3' c Wood 28' c Burrell 80' c Con: Myler (3/3) 3', 28' 80'; Pen: Myler (1/1) 57' | Report | Try: Solomona 65' |

Franklin's Gardens
Attendance: 14,108
Referee: Greg Garner

24 December 2016
13:30

| Saracens | 21–6 | Newcastle Falcons |
| Try: Bosch 19' c Ashton 79' m Con: Farrell (1/2) 19'; Pen: Farrell (4/4) 4', 21', 35', 69' | Report | Pen: J. Hodgson (2/2) 3', 11' |

Allianz Park
Attendance: 9,595
Referee: Matthew Carley

24 December 2016
14:00

| (1 BP) Wasps | 40–26 | Bath (1 BP) |
| Try: Wade (3) 6' c, 12' c, 46' c Young 38' c Con: Gopperth (4/4) 6', 12', 38', 47'; Pen: Gopperth (4/4) 21', 50', 55', 61' | Report | Try: Batty 16' c Attwood 24' c Ellis 58' m Tapuai 66' c Con: Ford (3/4) 16', 24', 66' |

Ricoh Arena
Attendance: 26,292
Referee: Luke Pearce

24 December 2016
15:00

| (1 BP) Exeter Chiefs | 31–10 | Leicester Tigers |
| Try: Waldrom (2) 4' c, 19' c Penalty try 33' c Devoto 65' c Con: Steenson (4/4) 4', 19', 33', 65'; Pen: Steenson (1/1) 43' | Report | Try: Thacker 56' m Kitto 67' m |

Sandy Park
Attendance: 12,420
Referee: Tom Foley

26 December 2016
15:00

| Bristol | 28–20 | Worcester Warriors |
| Try: Varndell (3) 9' c, 24' m, 66' c Con: Woodward (2/3) 9', 66'; Pen: Woodward (3/3) 3', 33', 57' | Report | Try: Barry 20' c Hammond 64' c Con: Pennell (2/2) 20', 64'; Pen: Shillcock (1/1) 6'; Pennell (1/1) 14' |

Ashton Gate
Attendance: 16,552
Referee: Wayne Barnes

27 December 2016
16:00

| Harlequins | 28–24 | Gloucester (1 BP) |
| Try: Marchant (2) 26' m, 58' c Clifford 41' c Con: Jackson (2/3) 41', 58'; Pen: Jackson (3/3) 37', 40', 50' | Report | Try: Evans 49' c Hook 63' c Matu'u 70' c Con: Laidlaw (2/2) 49', 63'; Burns (1/1) 70'; Pen: Laidlaw (1/1) 32' |

Twickenham Stadium
Attendance: 77,576
Referee: JP Doyle

=== Round 12 ===
30 December 2016
19:45

| (2 BP) Newcastle Falcons | 30–34 | Wasps (1 BP) |
| Try: Takulua 1' m M. Watson 3' c Vickers 26' c D. Wilson 79' m Con: J. Hodgson (2/4) 3', 26'; Pen: J. Hodgson (2/2) 32', 50' | Report | Try: Cipriani 20' c Wade 22' c Young 40' c Gopperth 46' c Con: Cipriani (3/3) 20', 22', 40'; Gopperth (1/1) 46'; Pen: Gopperth (1/1) 52'; Daly (1/1) 65' |

Kingston Park
Attendance: 8,730
Referee: Tom Foley

31 December 2016
15:00

| (1 BP) Bath | 11–17 | Exeter Chiefs |
| Try: Rokoduguni 31' m Pen: Ford (2/2) 19', 27' | Report | Try: Short (2) 72' c, 77' c Con: Steenson (2/2) 72', 77'; Pen: Steenson (1/1) 62' |

Recreation Ground
Attendance: 14,509
Referee: Craig Maxwell-Keys

1 January 2017
14:30

| (1 BP) Sale Sharks | 23–24 | Bristol |
| Try: Penalty try 14' c Solomona 21' m Leota 56' m Con: Mitchell (1/3) 14'; Pen: Mitchell (2/2) 32', 49' | Report | Try: Varndell 36' c R. Williams 58' c Crumpton 71' c Con: Woodward (3/3) 36', 58', 71'; Pen: Woodward (1/1) 34' |

AJ Bell Stadium
Attendance: 6,168
Referee: Ian Tempest

1 January 2017
15:00

| (1 BP) Gloucester | 12–13 | Northampton Saints |
| Pen: B. Burns (4/4) 11', 32', 36', 63' | Report | Try: Penalty try 73' c Con: Myler (1/1) 73'; Pen: Myler (2/2) 47', 59' |

Kingsholm
Attendance: 16,115
Referee: Matthew Carley

1 January 2017
15:00

| (1 BP) Leicester Tigers | 12–16 | Saracens |
| Pen: O. Williams (4/4) 11', 36', 47', 73' | Report | Try: Farrell 55' c Con: Farrell (1/1) 55'; Pen: Farrell (3/3) 25', 32', 72' |

Welford Road
Attendance: 25,248
Referee: JP Doyle

1 January 2017
15:00

| Worcester Warriors | 24–17 | Harlequins (1 BP) |
| Try: Hammond 8' c Te'o 43' m Con: Mills (1/2) 8'; Pen: Mills (4/4) 21', 27', 40', 67' | Report | Try: Matthews 61' c Alofa 76' c Con: Swiel (2/2) 61', 76'; Pen: Swiel (1/1) 80' |

Sixways
Attendance: 9,054
Referee: Luke Pearce

=== Round 13 ===
6 January 2017
19:45

| Newcastle Falcons | 24–22 | Bath (1 BP) |
| Try: Goneva 3' c M. Wilson 72' c B. Harris 77' c Con: J. Hodgson (3/3) 3', 72', 77'; Pen: J. Hodgson (1/1) 61' | Report | Try: Ford 44' c Rokoduguni (2) 53' c, 62' m Con: Ford (2/3) 44', 53'; Pen: Ford (1/1) 40' |

Kingston Park
Attendance: 6,042
Referee: Greg Garner

7 January 2017
15:00

| Saracens | 13–13 | Exeter Chiefs |
| Try: Lamositele 74' c Con: Lozowski (1/1) 74'; Pen: Lozowski (2/2) 24', 53' | Report | Try: Nowell 15' c Con: Steenson (1/1) 15'; Pen: Steenson (2/2) 12', 70' |

Allianz Park
Attendance: 10,000
Referee: Ian Tempest

7 January 2017
15:00

| (1 BP) Northampton Saints | 32–26 | Bristol (1 BP) |
| Try: Picamoles 14' c Haywood 34' c Wood 45' c Hanrahan 55' m Con: Myler (3/4) 14', 34', 45'; Pen: Myler (1/1) 73'; Drop: Mallinder (1/1) 77' | Report | Try: Eadie 21' c Woodward 53' c Con: Woodward (2/2) 21', 53'; Pen: Woodward (4/4) 16', 30', 51', 60' |

Franklin's Gardens
Attendance: 14,872
Referee: Andrew Jackson

7 January 2017
15:00

| Harlequins | 29–26 | Sale Sharks (1 BP) |
| Try: Walker 36' c Swiel 37' c Con: Swiel (2/2) 36', 37'; Pen: Swiel (5/5) 11', 16', 43', 52', 74' | Report | Try: Solomona (2) 26' c, 76' m McGuigan 49' m Con: Addison (1/3) 26'; Pen: Addison (3/3) 4', 13', 60' |

Twickenham Stoop
Attendance: 14,148
Referee: JP Doyle

7 January 2017
15:00

| (1 BP) Gloucester | 55–19 | Worcester Warriors |
| Try: May 15' c Scott (2) 19' c, 68' c Rowan 34' c Afoa 59' c Sharples 65' c Hohneck 76' c Con: Laidlaw (3/3) 15', 19', 34'; Twelvetrees (4/4) 59', 65', 68', 76'; Pen: Laidlaw (1/1) 4'; B. Burns (1/1) 46' | Report | Try: Vuna 32' c Cavubati 74' m Fa'osiliva 80' c Con: Mills (2/3) 32', 80' |

Kingsholm
Attendance: 14,584
Referee: Wayne Barnes

8 January 2017
15:00

| Wasps | 22–16 | Leicester Tigers (1 BP) |
| Try: Wade 4' c Taylor 10' m Robson 28' c Con: Gopperth (2/3) 4', 28'; Pen: Gopperth (1/1) 67' | Report | Try: Betham 51' c Con: F. Burns (1/1) 51'; Pen: O. Williams (2/2) 33', 44'; F. Burns (1/1) 60' |

Ricoh Arena
Attendance: 27,930
Referee: Craig Maxwell-Keys

=== Round 14 ===
10 February 2017
19:45

| (1 BP) Bath | 32–30 | Northampton Saints (1 BP) |
| Try: Grant 11' m Rokoduguni 27' c Penalty try 32' c Cook 71' c Con: Priestland (3/4) 27', 32', 71'; Pen: Priestland (2/2) 43', 80' | Report | Try: Foden 59' c Ratuniyarawa 68' c Gibson 74' c Con: Myler (3/3) 59', 68', 74'; Pen: Myler (3/3) 17', 26', 40' |

Recreation Ground
Attendance: 12,748
Referee: Wayne Barnes

10 February 2017
19:45

| Bristol | 8–42 | Harlequins (1 BP) |
| Try: Varndell 19' m Pen: Woodward (1/1) 11' | Report | Try: Marchant 3' c Reddish 43' c Mulchrone 56' c Hopper 60' m J. Chisholm 77' c Con: Jackson (3/4) 3', 43', 56'; Swiel (1/1) 77'; Pen: Jackson (2/2) 18', 40'; Swiel (1/1) 80' |

Ashton Gate
Attendance: 12,771
Referee: Matthew Carley

10 February 2017
20:15

| Sale Sharks | 26–24 | Newcastle Falcons (2 BP) |
| Try: Solomona 32' c B. McGuigan 40' m B. Evans 51' m Con: Addison (1/3) 32'; Pen: Addison (3/3) 7', 11', 75' | Report | Try: Socino 2' c Goneva (3) 27' m, 56' m, 61' c Con: Hodgson (1/3) 2'; Takulua (1/1) 61' |

AJ Bell Stadium
Attendance: 4,299
Referee: Craig Maxwell-Keys

11 February 2017
15:00

| (1 BP) Leicester Tigers | 34–9 | Gloucester |
| Try: Hamilton 4' c Penalty try 25' c Thompstone 73' c Mermoz 80' c Con: F. Burns (1/1) 4'; O. Williams (3/3) 25', 73', 80'; Pen: F. Burns (1/1) 13'; O. Williams (1/1) 41' | Report | Pen: Laidlaw (3/3) 9', 42', 54' |

Welford Road
Attendance: 20,918
Referee: Ian Tempest

11 February 2017
15:00

| Worcester Warriors | 24–18 | Saracens (1 BP) |
| Pen: Mills (8/8) 9', 23', 28', 39', 50', 57', 60', 72' | Report | Try: Ashton 37' c Brits 73' m Con: Lozowski (1/2) 37'; Pen: Lozowski (1/1) 52'; Spencer (1/1) 80' |

Sixways Stadium
Attendance: 7,302
Referee: Tom Foley

12 February 2017
13:00

| (1 BP) Exeter Chiefs | 35–35 | Wasps (1 BP) |
| Try: J. Simmonds 9' c Maunder 26' c Penalty try 37' c Cowan-Dickie 44' c Woodburn 50' c Con: Steenson (5/5) 9', 26', 37', 44', 50' | Report | Try: Wade 4' c Penalty try 14' c Rieder 28' c Eastmond 47' c Simpson 70'; Con: Gopperth (5/5) 4', 14', 28', 47', 70' |

Sandy Park
Attendance: 12,036
Referee: Greg Garner

=== Round 15 ===
17 February 2017
19:45

| Gloucester | 31–23 | Saracens |
| Try: Marshall 18' c Thrush 49' c Hibbard 75' m Con: B. Burns (2/3) 18', 49'; Pen: B. Burns (3/3) 6', 35', 40'; Twelvetrees (1/1) 74' | Report | Try: Brits 10' c Fraser 61' c Con: Lozowski (2/2) 10', 61'; Pen: Bosch (1/1) 14'; Lozowski (2/2) 25', 56' |

Kingsholm
Attendance: 11,889
Referee: Wayne Barnes

18 February 2017
15:00

| Bath | 22–12 | Harlequins |
| Try: Clark 63' c Con: Priestland (1/1) 63'; Pen: Priestland (5/5) 5', 15', 35', 75', 78' | Report | Try: Visser 29' c Yarde 47' m Con: Jackson (1/2) 29' |

Recreation Ground
Attendance: 14,509
Referee: Craig Maxwell-Keys

18 February 2017
15:00

| (1 BP) Leicester Tigers | 50–17 | Bristol |
| Try: Cilliers 13' m O. Williams 16' c Pietersen (2) 24' c, 29' m Veainu 27' c O'Connor 48' c Thompstone 56' m Bateman 67' c Con: O. Williams (5/8) 16', 24', 27', 48', 67' | Report | Try: Hawkins 40' c Ford-Robinson 68' c Con: Woodward (2/2) 40', 68'; Pen: Woodward (1/1) 8' |

Welford Road
Attendance: 21,848
Referee: Tom Foley

18 February 2017
15:00

| (1 BP) Worcester Warriors | 32–48 | Exeter Chiefs (1 BP) |
| Try: Adams 4' c Humphreys 14' m Penalty try 60' c Heem 64' c Con: Mills (3/4) 4', 60', 64'; Pen: Mills (2/2) 9', 37' | Report | Try: Steenson 7' c Short (3) 27' c, 50' m, 73' m Woodburn 45' c S. Simmonds 54' c Campagnaro 62' c Con: Steenson (2/2) 7', 27'; Slade (3/5) 45', 54', 62'; Pen: Steenson (1/1) 40' |

Sixways Stadium
Attendance: 8,783
Referee: JP Doyle

19 February 2017
15:00

| (1 BP) Newcastle Falcons | 46–31 | Northampton Saints (1 BP) |
| Try: Takulua (3) 19' c, 44' m, 52' m Robinson 35' m Vickers 42' c Cooper 58' c M. Wilson 77' c Con: Takulua (3/6) 19', 42, 77'; J. Hodgson (1/1) 58'; Pen: Takulua (1/1) 12' | Report | Try: K. Pisi 2' c Gibson 6' c Mallinder 28' c Haywood 67' c Con: Myler (4/4) 2', 6', 28', 67'; Pen: Myler (1/1) 16' |

Kingston Park
Attendance: 7,860
Referee: Greg Garner

19 February 2017
15:00

| (1 BP) Sale Sharks | 34–28 | Wasps (1 BP) |
| Try: Solomona (3) 19' c, 36' c, 39' c Jennings 43' c Con: Addison (4/4) 19', 36', 39', 43'; Pen: Addison (2/2) 6', 58' | Report | Try: Bassett 48' c Johnson 54' m Beale 69' c Con: Gopperth (2/3) 48', 69'; Pen: Gopperth (3/3) 10', 13', 23' |

AJ Bell Stadium
Attendance: 5,313
Referee: Matthew Carley

=== Round 16 ===
24 February 2017
19:45

| Harlequins | 18–27 | Leicester Tigers |
| Try: Alofa 25' c Ward 80' m Con: N. Evans (1/1) 25'; Pen: N. Evans (1/1) 24'; Jackson (1/1) 38' | Report | Try: Harrison 45' c Penalty try 51' c F. Burns 63' c Con: F. Burns (2/2) 45', 51'; O. Williams (1/1) 63'; Pen: F. Burns (2/2) 17', 57' |

Twickenham Stoop
Attendance: 14,800
Referee: Dean Richards

25 February 2017
14:45

| Saracens | 29–18 | Sale Sharks |
| Try: Taylor 12' m Ashton 20' c Earle 68' m Con: Lozowski (1/3) 20'; Pen: Lozowski (4/4) 19', 31', 40', 65' | Report | Try: Lund 56' c Neild 74' m Con: MacGinty (1/2) 56'; Pen: Addison (1/1) 2'; MacGinty (1/1) 16' |

Allianz Park
Attendance: 9,609
Referee: Tim Wigglesworth

25 February 2017
15:00

| (1 BP) Exeter Chiefs | 36–14 | Newcastle Falcons |
| Try: Short (2) 14' c, 80' m Williams 34' c Penalty try 57' c Skinner 73' c Con: J. Simmonds (4/5) 14', 34', 57', 73'; Pen: J. Simmonds (1/1) 40' | Report | Try: Goneva 5' c Vickers 23' c Con: Takulua (2/2) 5', 23' |

Sandy Park
Attendance: 10,469
Referee: Ian Tempest

25 February 2017
15:00

| Northampton Saints | 24–14 | Worcester Warriors |
| Try: Harrison 19' c Haywood (2) 40' c, 74' c Con: Myler (3/3) 19', 40', 74'; Pen: Myler (1/1) 31' | Report | Try: Adams 6' c Heem 80' c Con: Mills (1/1) 6'; Lamb (1/1) 80' |

Franklin's Gardens
Attendance: 15,095
Referee: Craig Maxwell-Keys

26 February 2017
13:00

| Bristol | 12–11 | Bath (1 BP) |
| Pen: Henson (3/3) 38', 41', 46'; Drop: Henson (1/1) 12' | Report | Try: Rokoduguni 67' m Pen: Priestland (2/2) 19', 58' |

Ashton Gate
Attendance: 16,258
Referee: Greg Garner

26 February 2017
13:00

| (1 BP) Wasps | 35–22 | Gloucester |
| Try: Gopperth (3) 9' m, 39' c, 75' m le Roux 47' c Wade 80' m Con: Gopperth (2/5) 39', 47'; Pen: Gopperth (2/2) 36', 61' | Report | Try: Hook 20' c Halaifonua 44' m Scott 71' c Con: Twelvetrees (2/3) 20', 71'; Pen: Twelvetrees (1/1) 6' |

Ricoh Arena
Attendance: 15,691
Referee: Andrew Jackson

=== Round 17 ===
3 March 2017
19:45

| Leicester Tigers | 15–34 | Exeter Chiefs (1 BP) |
| Try: Rizzo 4' m Mermoz 47' c Con: O. Williams (1/2) 47'; Pen: O. Williams (1/1) 16' | Report | Try: Horstmann 8' c Penalty try 23' c Townsend 33' c Lees 60' c Con: Slade (4/4) 8', 23', 33', 60'; Pen: Slade (2/2) 18', 40' |

Welford Road
Attendance: 20,434
Referee: Matthew Carley

3 March 2017
20:15

| Sale Sharks | 12–32 | Northampton Saints (1 BP) |
| Try: Chanley 37' c Evans 69' m Con: James (1/2) 37' | Report | Try: K. Pisi 28' m Paterson 34' c Haywood 55' c E. Waller 80' c Con: Myler (3/4) 34', 55', 80'; Pen: Myler (2/2) 40', 62' |

AJ Bell Stadium
Attendance: 5,233
Referee: Tom Foley

4 March 2017
15:00

| Bath | 3–24 | Wasps |
| Pen: Homer (1/1) 40' | Report | Try: Wade 13' c Beale (2) 25' c, 66' c Con: Gopperth (3/3) 13', 25', 66'; Pen: Gopperth (1/1) 49' |

Recreation Ground
Attendance: 14,132
Referee: JP Doyle

4 March 2017
15:00

| (1 BP) Gloucester | 27–30 | Harlequins (1 BP) |
| Try: Sharples (2) 3' c, 51' c Halaifonua 48' c Con: B. Burns (3/3) 3', 48', 51'; Pen: B. Burns (2/2) 34', 56' | Report | Try: Visser 22' m Mulchrone 30' c J. Chisholm 73' c R. Chisholm 76' m Con: Swiel (1/2) 30'; Lang (1/2) 73'; Pen: Swiel (1/1) 40'; Lang (1/1) 80' |

Kingsholm
Attendance: 14,014
Referee: Greg Garner

5 March 2017
14:00

| (1 BP) Newcastle Falcons | 27–35 | Saracens (1 BP) |
| Try: Waldouck 57' c Goneva 76' c D. Wilson 79' c Con: Takulua (1/1) 57'; Delany (2/2) 76', 79'; Pen: Takulua (2/2) 3', 10' | Report | Try: Rhodes 7' m Lozowski (2) 36' c, 65' c Ashton 52' m Earle 71' m Con: Lozowski (2/4) 36', 65'; Pen: Lozowski (2/2) 6', 31' |

Kingston Park
Attendance: 7,899
Referee: Craig Maxwell-Keys

5 March 2017
15:00

| (1 BP) Worcester Warriors | 41–24 | Bristol |
| Try: Penalty try 2' c Hougaard 19' c Spencer 33' c Heem (2) 38' c, 63' m Olivier 79' m Con: Mills (4/6) 2', 19', 33', 38'; Pen: Mills (1/1) 6' | Report | Try: Woodward 24' c Crumpton 68' c Varndell 72' c Con: Henson (1/1) 24'; Woodward (1/1) 68'; Wallace (1/1) 72'; Pen: Henson (1/1) 18' |

Sixways Stadium
Attendance: 11,499
Referee: Wayne Barnes

=== Round 18 ===
24 March 2017
19:45

| Bristol | 14–32 | Gloucester (1 BP) |
| Try: Crumpton 78' m Pen: Searle (3/3) 12', 40', 54' | Report | Try: Sharples 14' c B. Burns 56' c Ludlow 70' m May 80' c Con: B. Burns (3/4) 14', 56', 80'; Pen: B. Burns (2/2) 3', 37' |

Ashton Gate
Attendance: 14,051
Referee: JP Doyle

25 March 2017
15:00

| (1 BP) Exeter Chiefs | 30–25 | Sale Sharks (1 BP) |
| Try: Horstmann 25' m Cowan-Dickie 39' c Woodburn 46' m Armand 66' c Con: Slade (2/4) 39', 66'; Pen: Slade (2/2) 51', 76' | Report | Try: Solomona 22' c Con: MacGinty (1/1) 22'; Pen: MacGinty (6/6) 11', 16', 30', 35', 54', 80' |

Sandy Park
Attendance: 10,924
Referee: Craig Maxwell-Keys

25 March 2017
15:00

| (1 BP) Harlequins | 53–17 | Newcastle Falcons |
| Try: Buchanan 15' c Brown 22' c Marchant 40' c Yarde 42' c Luamanu 49' c Care 55' c Swiel 78' m Con: N. Evans (6/6) 15', 22', 40', 42', 49', 55'; Pen: N. Evans (2/2) 13', 34' | Report | Try: Takulua 3' c M. Wilson 67' c Con: Takulua (1/1) 3'; Delany (1/1) 67'; Pen: Takulua (1/1) 31' |

Twickenham Stoop
Attendance: 14,200
Referee: Tom Foley

25 March 2017
15:00

| (1 BP) Northampton Saints | 31–36 | Leicester Tigers |
| Try: Tuitavake 2' c Tuala 10' c Picamoles 23' m Con: Myler (2/3) 2', 10'; Pen: Myler (4/4) 36', 49', 56', 74' | Report | Try: Thompstone 6' c B. Youngs 46' c McCaffrey 70' c Con: F. Burns (1/1) 6'; O. Williams (2/2) 46', 70'; Pen: F. Burns (3/3) 17', 22', 28'; O. Williams (2/2) 77', 80' |

Franklin's Gardens
Attendance: 15,249
Referee: Greg Garner

26 March 2017
14:30

| (1 BP) Wasps | 40–33 | Worcester Warriors (2 BP) |
| Try: Rowlands 11' m Wade (2) 14' c, 41' c Leiua 54' c Bassett 63' c Macken 73' c Con: Gopperth (4/5) 14', 41'+1, 55', 66'; Cipriani (1/1) 74' | Report | Try: Heem 5' m Adams (2) 23' c, 38' c Alo 76' c Willison 80' c Con: R. Mills (4/5) 24', 39', 76', 81' |

Ricoh Arena
Attendance: 14,949
Referee: Luke Pearce

26 March 2017
15:00

| (1 BP) Saracens | 53–10 | Bath |
| Try: George 3' c Goode 12' m Maitland 40' m Brits 59' c Barritt 62' m Ashton (2) 70' c, 75', c B. Vunipola 73' c Con: Farrell (5/8) 4', 60', 71', 74', 76'; Pen: Farrell 43' | Report | Try: A. Watson 25' c Con: Ford (1/1) 26'; Pen: Ford 20' |

Allianz Park
Attendance: 10,000
Referee: Wayne Barnes

=== Round 19 ===
7 April 2017
19:45

| (1 BP) Sale Sharks | 36–26 | Worcester Warriors (1 BP) |
| Try: James (2) 6' c, 27' c Haley 38' c B. McGuigan 63' m B. Curry 76' c Con: MacGinty (4/5) 6', 28', 39', 77'; Pen: MacGinty (1/1) 74' | Report | Try: Hougaard 10' c Taufete'e 18' c Pennell 69' c Alo 80' m Con: R. Mills (2/2) 11', 19'; Lamb (1/2) 70' |

AJ Bell Stadium
Attendance: 5,966
Referee: Matthew Carley

7 April 2017
20:00

| Newcastle Falcons | 16–14 | Gloucester (1 BP) |
| Try: Socino 22' c Con: Delany (1/1) 23'; Pen: Delany (0/1); Hodgson (3/3) 46', 65', 80' | Report | Try: May 37' c Marshall 47'; Con: Twelvetrees (2/2) 38', 48' |

Kingston Park
Attendance: 7,738
Referee: Luke Pearce

8 April 2017
14:00

| Bath | 27–21 | Leicester Tigers (1 BP) |
| Try: Joseph 20' c A. Watson (2) 67' c, 70' c Con: Ford (3/3) 22', 68', 71'; Pen: Ford (2/3) 27', 50' | Report | Try: O'Connor 4' c Veainu 11' m Con: F. Burns (1/2) 5'; Pen: F. Burns (3/3) 30', 42', 65' |

Twickenham Stadium
Attendance: 61,868
Referee: JP Doyle

8 April 2017
15:00

| (1 BP) Exeter Chiefs | 38–34 | Bristol (2 BP) |
| Try: Woodburn 1' c Parling 40' c Whitten 41' c Waldrom (2) 52' c, 76' c Con: Slade (4/4) 2', 40', 41', 53'; Steenson (1/1) 77'; Pen: Slade (1/1) 19' | Report | Try: Hurrell 4' c Woodward 11' c Henson 21' c Eadie 59' c Con: Henson (4/4) 4', 12', 22', 59'; Pen: Henson (2/3) 10', 56' |

Sandy Park
Attendance: 12,232
Referee: Tom Foley

8 April 2017
16:30

| (1 BP) Saracens | 40–19 | Harlequins |
| Try: Ashton 16' c Brits 23' c Rhodes 72' c Goode 77' c Con: Farrell (4/4) 17', 23', 72', 79'; Pen: Farrell (4/4) 34', 42', 61', 68' | Report | Try: Horwill 74' c Con: Swiel (1/1) 74'; Pen: N. Evans (4/4) 11', 27', 30', 49' |

Wembley Stadium
Attendance: 71,324
Referee: Ian Tempest

9 April 2017
14:30

| (1 BP) Wasps | 32–30 | Northampton Saints (2 BP) |
| Try: Daly 16' c Wade 43' c Simpson 51' m Mullan 80' c Con: Gopperth (3/4) 17', 34', 80'; Pen: Gopperth (2/3) 27', 31' | Report | Try: Foden 11' m A. Waller 22' m North 37' m Tuala 58' m T. Harrison 67' c Con: Myler (1/5) 67'; Pen: Myler (1/2) 9' |

Ricoh Arena
Attendance: 21,131
Referee: Craig Maxwell-Keys

=== Round 20 ===
14 April 2017
19:45

| Harlequins | 26–39 | Exeter Chiefs (1 BP) |
| Try: Luamanu 2' m N. Evans 41' m Visser 80' c Con: N. Evans (0/2); Swiel (1/1) 80'; Pen: N. Evans (3/3) 27', 40', 56 | Report | Try: Ewers 16' m Campagnaro 35' c Turner (2) 64' c, 75' c Slade 68' c Con: Slade (1/2) 36'; Steenson (3/3) 64', 69', 76'; Pen: Slade (2/2) 7', 49' |

Twickenham Stoop
Attendance: 14,800
Referee: Wayne Barnes

15 April 2017
15:00

| (1 BP) Gloucester | 39–30 | Sale Sharks (1 BP) |
| Try: Marshall (2) 10' c, 66' c Hibbard 30' m Trinder 56' c Twelvetrees 74' c Con: B. Burns (4/5) 12', 56', 67', 76'; Pen: B. Burns (2/3) 29', 80' | Report | Try: James 12' c M. Phillips 15' m Longbottom 41' c B. McGuigan 46' m Con: MacGinty (2/4) 14', 42'; Pen: MacGinty (2/2) 63', 78' |

Kingsholm
Attendance: 12,928
Referee: Tom Foley

15 April 2017
15:00

| (1 BP) Leicester Tigers | 30–3 | Newcastle Falcons |
| Try: Genge (2) 40' m, 55' c Veainu 47' c B. Youngs 71' m Con: F. Burns (2/4) 48', 55'; Pen: F. Burns (2/2) 4', 35' | Report | Pen: Hodgson (1/1) 24' |

Welford Road
Attendance: 23,773
Referee: Ian Tempest

15 April 2017
15:00

| Worcester Warriors | 25–19 | Bath (1 BP) |
| Try: Adams 50' m Olivier 58' c W. Spencer 73' c Con: R. Mills (2/3) 59', 75'; Pen: R. Mills (2/3) 34', 40' | Report | Try: Banahan 36' c Con: Ford (1/1) 38'; Pen: Ford (4/4) 22', 44', 66', 76' |

Sixways
Attendance: 11,343
Referee: Luke Pearce

16 April 2017
15:00

| Bristol | 21–36 | Wasps (1 BP) |
| Try: Woodward 2' c O'Connell 68' c Fenton-Wells 78' c Con: Henson (1/1) 3'; Searle (2/2) 69', 78'; Drop: Searle (0/1) | Report | Try: Bassett (2) 15' c, 63' m T. Taylor 18' c Simpson 37' c Wade 51' m Thompson 56' m Con: Gopperth (3/4) 16', 19', 38'; Cipriani (0/2); Drop: Daly (0/1) |

Ashton Gate
Attendance: 12,310
Referee: Greg Garner

- Bristol are relegated providing the 2016–17 RFU Championship winners meet the minimum standards criteria.

16 April 2017
15:00

| (1 BP) Northampton Saints | 25–27 | Saracens |
| Try: Mallinder 5' c Hartley 41' c K. Pisi 52' m Con: Myler (1/1) 7'; Mallinder (1/2) 42'; Pen: Myler (2/2) 17', 28'; Mallinder (0/1) | Report | Try: Ashton 68', m Bosch 77' c Con: Lozowski (1/2) 78'; Pen: Lozowski (5/5) 22', 32', 44', 50', 75' |

Stadium mk, Milton Keynes
Attendance: 24,163
Referee: Matthew Carley

=== Round 21 ===
28 April 2017
19:45

| Harlequins | 32–13 | Wasps |
| Try: Visser 44' c Marchant 78' c Con: N. Evans (2/2) 46', 79'; Pen: N. Evans (6/7) 11', 34', 51', 58', 69', 73'; Drop: N. Evans (0/1) | Report | Try: Robson 24' c Con: Gopperth (1/1) 25'; Pen: Gopperth (2/3) 39', 62' |

Twickenham Stoop
Attendance: 14,800
Referee: Wayne Barnes

28 April 2017
20:00

| Newcastle Falcons | 16–14 | Worcester Warriors (1 BP) |
| Try: Takulua 74' c Con: Takulua (1/1) 75'; Pen: Takulua (3/3) 31', 35', 45' | Report | Try: Penalty try 51' c Olivier 58' c Con: R. Mills (2/2) 52', 58' |

Kingston Park
Attendance: 7,375
Referee: Greg Garner

29 April 2017
15:00

| (1 BP) Exeter Chiefs | 36–12 | Northampton Saints |
| Try: Armand 26' c Woodburn (2) 31' m, 76' c Whitten 41' m Nowell 57' m S. Hill 68' c Con: Steenson (2/5) 27', 69'; J. Simmonds (1/1) 77' | Report | Try: Hanrahan 4' c Tuala 80' m Con: Hanrahan (1/2) 5' |

Sandy Park
Attendance: 12,284
Referee: JP Doyle

29 April 2017
15:00

| (1 BP) Leicester Tigers | 41–18 | Sale Sharks |
| Try: F. Burns 23' c G. Kitchener 30' c O. Williams 62' c Jc. Roberts 66' c G. McGuigan 79' c Con: F. Burns (5/5) 24', 31', 62', 67', 80'; Pen: F. Burns (2/2) 7', 40' | Report | Try: Webber 14' c B. Evans 74' m Con: MacGinty (1/2) 15'; Pen: MacGinty (2/2) 21', 50' |

Welford Road
Attendance: 23,940
Referee: Craig Maxwell-Keys

29 April 2017
15:00

| Saracens | 27–9 | Bristol |
| Try: Ashton 45' c du Plessis (2) 58' m, 79', c Tompkins 61' m Con: Farrell (2/4) 47', 80'; Pen: Farrell (1/2) 35' | Report | Pen: Henson (3/3) 24', 28', 32' |

Allianz Park
Attendance: 10,000
Referee: Andrew Jackson

30 April 2017
15:00

| (1 BP) Bath | 44–20 | Gloucester |
| Try: Faletau (3) 26' c, 70' m, 75' m Brew 42' c M. Clark 48' c Fruean 66' c Con: Priestland (4/6) 27', 44', 49', 67'; Pen: Priestland (2/3) 21', 55' | Report | Try: May (2) 33' m, 73' m Halaifonua 79' c Con: B. Burns (0/1); Laidlaw (1/2) 79'; Pen: Hook 25' |

Recreation Ground
Attendance: 14,509
Referee: Matthew Carley

=== Round 22 ===
6 May 2017
16:00

| (1 BP) Bristol | 27–39 | Newcastle Falcons (1 BP) |
| Try: Ford-Robinson 52' c O'Connell 62' c Tovey 76' m Eadie 79' m Con: Woodward (2/4) 53', 63'; Pen: Henson 40' | Report | Try: M. Wilson 2' c Goneva (2) 20' m, 57' c M. Watson 43' c C. Harris 72' c Con: Takulua (4/5) 3', 44', 58', 73; Pen: Takulua (2/2) 13', 24' |

Ashton Gate
Attendance: 9,822
Referee: Luke Pearce

6 May 2017
16:00

| Gloucester | 20–34 | Exeter Chiefs (1 BP) |
| Try: Ludlow 7' c May (2) 27' m, 59' m Con: Laidlaw (1/3) 8'; Pen: Laidlaw (1/1) 19' | Report | Try: Whitten 35' c Moon 51' c Short 55' c Chudley 68' c Con: Steenson (4/4) 35', 52', 56' 68'; Pen: Steenson (2/3) 17', 20', 25' |

Kingsholm
Attendance: 16,115
Referee: Ian Tempest

6 May 2017
16:00

| Northampton Saints | 22–20 | Harlequins (1 BP) |
| Try: North 14' c A. Waller 22' c Ratuniyarawa 68' m Con: Mallinder (2/3) 15', 23'; Pen: Mallinder (1/1) 37'; Drop: Mallinder (0/1) | Report | Try: Horwill 2' c Marchant 33' c Con: N. Evans (2/2) 3', 35'; Pen: N. Evans (2/4) 9', 49' |

Franklin's Gardens
Attendance: 15,249
Referee: JP Doyle

6 May 2017
16:00

| Sale Sharks | 27–24 | Bath (1 BP) |
| Try: Solomona 32' c B. Curry 40' c Charnley 49' c Con: MacGinty (3/3) 34', 40', 51'; Pen: MacGinty (2/2) 16', 26' | Report | Try: M. Clark 22' c Penalty try 55' c Banahan 62' c Con: Priestland (2/2) 23', 55'; Ford (1/1) 62'; Pen: Priestland (1/1) 35' |

AJ Bell Stadium
Attendance: 8,306
Referee: Greg Garner

6 May 2017
16:00

| (1 BP) Wasps | 35–15 | Saracens |
| Try: T. Young (3) 19' m, 38' m, 77' m Wade 58' c Daly 70' c Con: Gopperth (2/5) 58', 71'; Pen: Gopperth (2/3) 15', 34' | Report | Try: B. Spencer (2) 16' c, 62' m Con: Lozowski (1/2) 17'; Pen: Bosch (1/1) 31'; Drop: Lozowski (0/1) |

Ricoh Arena
Attendance: 30,115
Referee: Wayne Barnes

6 May 2017
16:00

| (1 BP) Worcester Warriors | 23–28 | Leicester Tigers |
| Try: Pennell 31' c Heem 42' m Olivier 64' m Con: R. Mills (1/2) 32'; Lamb (0/1); Pen: R. Mills (2/4) 14', 40' | Report | Try: T. Youngs 27' c Con: F. Burns (1/1) 28'; Pen: F. Burns (6/6) 12', 18', 36', 54', 57', 69'; Drop: F. Burns (1/1) 48' |

Sixways
Attendance: 11,499
Referee: Tom Foley

== Play-offs ==
As in previous seasons, the top four teams in the Premiership table, following the conclusion of the regular season, contest the play-off semi-finals in a 1st vs 4th and 2nd vs 3rd format, with the higher ranking team having home advantage. The two winners of the semi-finals then meet in the Premiership Final at Twickenham on 27 May 2017.

=== Bracket ===
Semi-finals
1 | Wasps | 21
4 | Leicester Tigers | 20
2 | Exeter Chiefs | 18
3 | Saracens | 16

Final
1 | Wasps | 20
2 | Exeter Chiefs (a.e.t.) | 23

=== Semi-finals ===
20 May 2017
14:30

| Exeter Chiefs | 18–16 | Saracens |
| Try: Nowell 42' c S. Simmonds 79' m Con: Steenson (1/2) 43'; Pen: Steenson (2/2) 25', 30' | Report | Try: Wyles 56' m Ellery 75' m Con: Farrell (0/2); Pen: Farrell (2/2) 4', 14' |

Sandy Park
Attendance: 12,436
Referee: Wayne Barnes

20 May 2017
17:15

| Wasps | 21–20 | Leicester Tigers |
| Try: Beale 7' c Bassett 77' m Con: Gopperth (1/2) 9'; Pen: Gopperth (3/4) 1', 23', 39' | Report | Try: Betham 26' c Veainu 51' c Con: F. Burns (2/2) 28', 53'; Pen: F. Burns (2/2) 16', 20' |

Ricoh Arena
Attendance: 29,051
Referee: Matthew Carley

=== Final ===
27 May 2017
14:30

| Wasps | 20–23 a.e.t. | Exeter Chiefs |
| Try: Gopperth 40' c Daly 44' c Con: Gopperth (2/2); Pen: Gopperth (2/2) 18', 54' | Report | Try: Nowell 14' c Dollman 28' c Con: Steenson (2/2); Pen: Steenson (3/3) 64', 80', 98' |

Twickenham Stadium
Attendance: 79,657
Referee: JP Doyle

Team details

Wasps
Exeter Chiefs

| FB | 15 | (South Africa) Willie le Roux |
| RW | 14 | (England) Christian Wade |
| OC | 13 | (England) Elliot Daly |
| IC | 12 | (New Zealand) Jimmy Gopperth |
| LW | 11 | (England) Josh Bassett |
| FH | 10 | (England) Danny Cipriani |
| SH | 9 | (England) Dan Robson | (substituted off) 58' |
| N8 | 8 | (England) Nathan Hughes | (substituted off) 18' | (substituted in) 26' |
| OF | 7 | (Wales) Thomas Young | (substituted off) 64' |
| BF | 6 | (England) James Haskell |
| RL | 5 | (England) Matt Symons | (substituted off) 58' |
| LL | 4 | (England) Joe Launchbury (c) |
| TP | 3 | (England) Phil Swainston | (substituted off) 27' |
| HK | 2 | (England) Tommy Taylor | (substituted off) 64' |
| LP | 1 | (England) Matt Mullan | (substituted off) 58' | (substituted in) 83' |
Substitutions:
| HK | 16 | (South Africa) Ashley Johnson | (substituted in) 64' |
| PR | 17 | (England) Simon McIntyre | (substituted in) 58' |
| PR | 18 | (Ireland) Marty Moore | (substituted in) 27' | (substituted off) 83' |
| LK | 19 | (England) Kearnan Myall | (substituted in) 58' |
| N8 | 20 | (England) Guy Thompson | (substituted in) 18' | (substituted off) 26' | (substituted in) 64' |
| SH | 21 | (England) Joe Simpson | (substituted in) 58' |
| WG | 22 | (Samoa) Alapati Leiua |
| WG | 23 | (New Zealand) Frank Halai |
Coach:
(Wales) Dai Young

| FB | 15 | (Wales) Phil Dollman | (substituted off) 46' |
| RW | 14 | (England) Jack Nowell |
| OC | 13 | (Ireland) Ian Whitten |
| IC | 12 | (England) Ollie Devoto | (substituted off) 76' |
| LW | 11 | (England) Olly Woodburn | (substituted off) 54' |
| FH | 10 | (Ireland) Gareth Steenson (c) |
| SH | 9 | (England) Stuart Townsend | (substituted off) 49' |
| N8 | 8 | (England) Thomas Waldrom |
| OF | 7 | (Zimbabwe) Don Armand |
| BF | 6 | (Zimbabwe) Kai Horstmann | (substituted off) 53' |
| RL | 5 | (England) Geoff Parling |
| LL | 4 | (Australia) Dave Dennis | (substituted off) 60' |
| TP | 3 | (England) Harry Williams | (substituted off) 50' |
| HK | 2 | (England) Luke Cowan-Dickie | (substituted off) 50' |
| LP | 1 | (England) Ben Moon | (substituted off) 50' |
Replacements:
| HK | 16 | (England) Jack Yeandle | (substituted in) 50' |
| PR | 17 | (England) Carl Rimmer | (substituted in) 50' |
| PR | 18 | (Wales) Tomas Francis | (substituted in) 50' |
| FL | 19 | (England) Mitch Lees | (substituted in) 53' |
| LK | 20 | (England) Sam Simmonds | (substituted in) 60' |
| SH | 21 | (England) Will Chudley | (substituted in) 49' |
| FB | 22 | (England) Henry Slade | (substituted in) 46' |
| CE | 23 | (Italy) Michele Campagnaro | (substituted in) 76' |
Coach:
(England) Rob Baxter

Man of the Match:
Don Armand (Exeter Chiefs)

Touch judges:
Matthew Carley
Luke Pearce
Television match official:
Rowan Kitt

== Leading scorers ==
Note: Flags indicate national union as defined under World Rugby (WR) eligibility rules. Players may hold more than one non-WR nationality.

=== Most points ===
As of 27 May 2017

| Rank | Player | Club | Points |
|---|---|---|---|
| 1 | (New Zealand) Jimmy Gopperth | Wasps | 292 |
| 2 | (England) Stephen Myler | Northampton | 190 |
| 3 | (England) Freddie Burns | Leicester | 183 |
| 3 | (Ireland) Gareth Steenson | Exeter | 183 |
| 5 | (England) Alex Lozowski | Saracens | 175 |
| 6 | (England) George Ford | Bath | 142 |
| 7 | (Wales) Owen Williams | Leicester | 125 |
| 8 | (New Zealand) Nick Evans | Harlequins | 115 |
| 9 | (South Africa) Tim Swiel | Harlequins | 103 |
| 10 | (United States) AJ MacGinty | Sale | 101 |

=== Most tries ===
As of 25 May 2017

| Rank | Player | Club | Tries |
|---|---|---|---|
| 1 | (England) Christian Wade | Wasps | 17 |
| 2 | (England) James Short | Exeter | 11 |
| 3 | (New Zealand) Jimmy Gopperth | Wasps | 10 |
| 3 | (England) Denny Solomona | Sale | 10 |
| 3 | (England) Semesa Rokoduguni | Bath | 10 |
| 3 | (England) Olly Woodburn | Exeter | 10 |
| 7 | (England) Chris Ashton | Saracens | 9 |
| 7 | (Fiji) Vereniki Goneva | Newcastle | 9 |
| 7 | (Scotland) Matt Scott | Gloucester | 9 |
| 7 | (England) Charlie Sharples | Gloucester | 9 |
| 7 | (England) Thomas Waldrom | Exeter | 9 |

== Awards ==
The following received Player of the Month awards during the 2016–17 season, as selected by a panel of media commentators, in addition to monthly public polls.

| Month | Nationality | Player | Position | Club |
|---|---|---|---|---|
| September | New Zealand | Jimmy Gopperth | Fly-Half | Wasps |
| October | England | Mako Vunipola | Prop | Saracens |
| November | England | Freddie Burns | Fly-Half | Leicester |
| December | England | Tom Varndell | Wing | Bristol |
| February | England | James Short | Wing | Exeter |
| March | England | Christian Wade | Wing | Wasps |
| April | Wales | Taulupe Faletau | Number 8 | Bath |
