= Gareth Evans (rugby union, born 1991) =

Gareth Evans can refer to two different rugby union players born in 1991:

- Gareth Evans (rugby union, born August 1991), New Zealand rugby union player
- Gareth Evans (rugby union, born September 1991), English rugby union player
