= Mike Haywood =

Mike Haywood may refer to:

- Michael Haywood (born 1964), head football coach at Texas Southern University
- Mike Haywood (rugby union) (born 1991), English rugby union player
