= Gareth Steenson =

- Born: Gareth R. Steenson; 5 April 1984 (age 42) Armagh, Northern Ireland, United Kingdom
- Height: 1.78 m (5 ft 10 in)
- Weight: 87 kg (13.7 st; 192 lb)
- School: The Royal School, Armagh
- University: Queen's University Belfast

Rugby union career
- Position: Fly-half
Amateur team(s)
| Years | Team | Apps | (Points) |
| 2000–2002 | City of Armagh RFC | | |
| 2002–2004 | Queen's University | | |
| – | Dungannon | | |
- Correct as of 2004-2006
Senior career
| Years | Team | Apps | (Points) |
| 2006–2007 | Rotherham Titans | 30 | (264) |
| 2007–2008 | Cornish Pirates | 24 | (290) |
| 2008–2020 | Exeter Chiefs | 290 | (2,531) |
- Correct as of 17 October 2020
International career
| Years | Team | Apps | (Points) |
| 2002 | Ireland U19 | | |
| 2004 | Ireland U21 | | |
Coaching career
- Years: Team
- 2019–: Plymouth (assistant coach)

Gareth Steenson (born 5 April 1984) is an Irish former rugby union player. He played as a fly-half.

== Playing career ==
=== Early years ===
Steenson, who is from Ulster, did not get opportunities with his home province with Ulster Rugby in part because Ireland international David Humphreys was the starting flyhalf. Steenson left Ireland to play for the Rotherham Titans.

=== Exeter ===
Steenson played a massive part in the final leg of the 2009–10 Championship final against Bristol, scoring 24 points and helping Exeter Chiefs win 29–10 (38–16 including the first leg). Steenson burst into the scene in England at his previous club, Cornish Pirates, scoring 264 points in his first season (30 games).

Steenson narrowly missed out on the golden boot by one point to Premiership rival Freddie Burns at the 2012–13 Premiership awards. He won the golden boot in the 2016 Premiership awards. Steenson also helped Exeter Chiefs reach the 2016 Premiership Rugby final. The following year he started the final and scored two conversions and three penalties, including the winning points, as Exeter Chiefs defeated Wasps to be crowned champions of the 2016-17 English Premiership.

== International ==
Steenson played for the Ireland under-19 team and the under-21 team.

== Retirement ==
Steenson joined Plymouth Albion's coaching team ahead of the 2019–20 season as an assistant coach, focusing on their attack. The role initially saw him remain an Exeter player, but he retired from playing at the conclusion of the 2019–20 season.

He was nominated for the Freedom of the City of Exeter, and his nomination was unanimously approved by the Exeter City Council on 15 December 2020. The Honour was formally presented to him in a ceremony at the Exeter Guildhall on 7 October 2021.

== Honours ==
=== Exeter Chiefs ===
- RFU Championship
  - Winner (1): (2009–10)
- English Premiership
  - Winner (2): (2016–17, 2019–20)
- European Rugby Champions Cup
  - Winner (1): (2019–20)

== Outside rugby ==
As of October 2018, Steenson was planning to open an Irish bar named The Stand-Off in the centre of Exeter with fellow rugby footballer Carl Rimmer.
