= Stu Townsend =

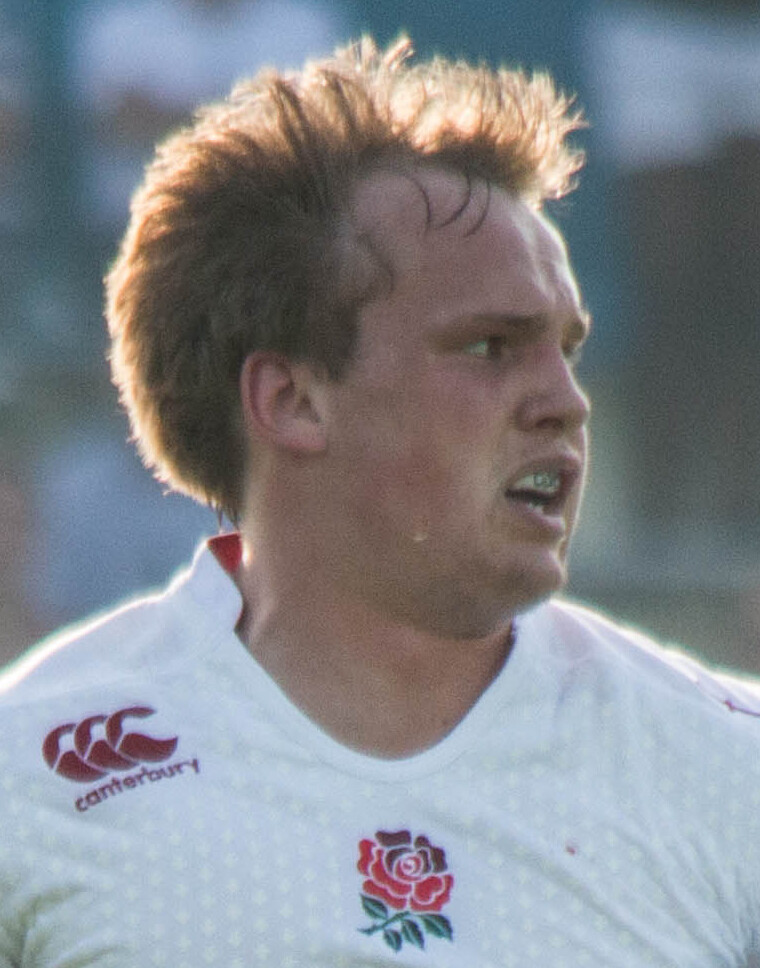
- Born: Stuart Townsend; 11 October 1995 (age 31) Torbay, England
- Height: 5 ft 5 in (165 cm)
- Weight: 225 lb (102 kg)

Rugby union career
- Position: Scrum half
- Current team: Harlequins
Senior career
Years	Team	Apps	(Points)
2012–2025	Exeter Chiefs	121	(100)
2013–2014	→ Taunton (loan)	13	(45)
2014–2017	→ Cornish Pirates (loan)	35	(25)
2025–	Harlequins	0	(0)
- Correct as of 17 July 2025
International career
Years	Team	Apps	(Points)
2014–2015	England U20	9	(15)
- Correct as of 17 July 2019

Stu Townsend (born 11 October 1995) is an English professional rugby union player who plays scrum-half for Premiership Rugby club Harlequins.

== Early life ==
Born in Torbay, Townsend was first introduced to rugby as a six-year-old at his local club Kingsbridge. He was educated at the local Primary and Community College before attending Ivybridge Community College, where he joined the Exeter Chiefs Academy system.

== Early career ==
Townsend featured for England at various age levels, including that of the Under-20s, and also in the National Leagues with both Taunton Titans and the Cornish Pirates.

== Club career ==
=== Exeter Chiefs ===
After playing regularly in the Championship Townsend was recalled to the Chiefs squad midway through the 16/17 season after injuries to fellow nines, Dave Lewis and Will Chudley.

After a number of appearances off the bench both in the Premiership and Europe, on his first full starting appearance he scored a try against Leicester Tigers at Welford Road. He started the final as Exeter Chiefs defeated Wasps to be crowned champions of the 2016-17 English Premiership.

He scored a try for Exeter in the second minute of the semi-final against Newcastle Falcons to help book a place in the final of the Anglo-Welsh Cup for Exeter to be played against Bath Rugby on the 18 March 2018. The final was rearranged to March 30 due to snow and Townsend played as the Chiefs won 28-11.

After making 106 appearances for Exeter he signed a new contract with the club in May 2024.

=== Harlequins ===
In May 2025, he signed for Harlequins ahead of the following season.
