= Billy Burns (rugby union) =

Ireland international rugby union player

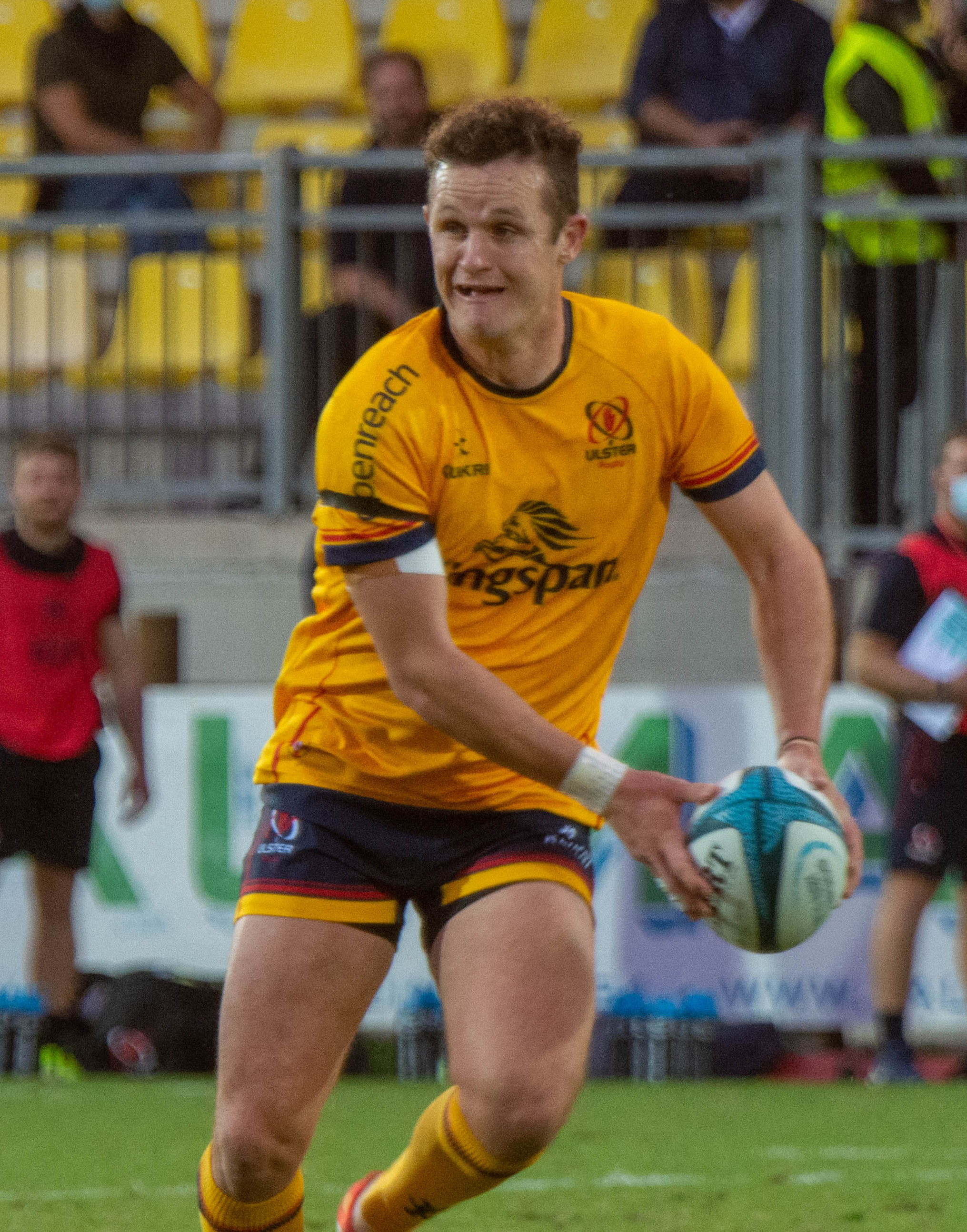
- Burns in 2021
- Born: Billy Sean Burns; 13 June 1994 (age 32) Bath, Somerset, England
- Height: 1.85 m (6 ft 1 in)
- Weight: 86 kg (13.5 st; 190 lb)
- School: Beechen Cliff School; Hartpury College
- Notable relative: Freddie Burns (brother)

Rugby union career
- Position(s): Fly-half, Fullback
- Current team: Shimizu Blue Sharks
Senior career
Years	Team	Apps	(Points)
2012–2018	Gloucester	101	(304)
2012–2013	→ Hartpury (loan)	36	(276)
2018–2024	Ulster	114	(120)
2024–2025	Munster	11	(35)
2025–	Shimizu Blue Sharks	15	(99)
- Correct as of 1 June 2025
International career
Years	Team	Apps	(Points)
	England U18	10	(10)
2013–2014	England U20	8	(84)
2020–	Ireland	7	(29)
- Correct as of 4 July 2021

Billy Sean Burns (born 13 June 1994) is an Irish professional rugby union player who plays for Shimizu Blue Sharks, having previously played for Gloucester, Ulster and Munster. His favoured position is fly-half. He is the younger brother of England fly-half Freddie Burns. Born in England, Burns represented England for youth rugby union teams, before choosing to represent Ireland at the 2020 Six Nations Championship

== Early life and family ==
Burns was born and raised in Bath, Somerset, the youngest of four sons of Jerry Burns, the director of a plumbing company, and his wife Donna. He attended Beechen Cliff School where he first started playing rugby union, and studied at Hartpury College.

== Club career ==
=== Gloucester ===
A product of Gloucester Rugby's academy, Burns made his first team debut as a seventeen-year-old substitute in a loss to London Irish in the LV Cup in February 2012. That year, he would also have success for the England Under 18 side, winning the European Championships held in Spain, scoring 7 points in the final against Ireland which England won 25 – 13.

He had two loan spells at Hartpury College. In his first spell, in the 2012–13 season, he made 17 appearances in National League 2 South, scoring 71 points which included 6 tries, helping the club to 3rd place in the division. He also made several appearances for Gloucester that season in the LV Cup, and was part of the sevens side that won the 2013 Premiership Rugby Sevens Series in the summer, scoring a conversion in the final victory against Leicester Tigers. The following season he signed a new contract with Gloucester, and made debut appearances in the Heineken Cup and Aviva Premiership, but most of the season was spent back on loan at Hartpury College, helping the club to win the 2013–14 National League 2 South league title and promotion to National League 1, and being one of the league's top points scorers with 205 points. He was also called up by the England Under-20 team for the Six Nations. In the summer he played a key role in England Under-20s victory at the 2014 IRB Junior World Championship held in New Zealand, scoring 11 points as England triumphed 21 – 20 over South Africa in the final.

The following season Burns got more game time at Gloucester, accumulating 17 appearances across all competitions and making the bench for the side that won the 2014–15 European Rugby Challenge Cup. In 2015–16 he made appearances at fly-half and full-back, before sustaining a knee injury against Wasps in March 2016, which ended his season. He was Gloucester's first choice fly-half for the 2016–17 and 2017–18 seasons, but after the club signed Danny Cipriani, Burns asked to be released from the last year of his contract.

=== Ulster ===
Burns joined Ulster on a two-year contract in July 2018. Ulster were short of an experienced fly-half following the retirement of Ian Humphreys and the termination of Paddy Jackson's contract. After Christian Lealiifano's loan deal ended, Ulster's only recognised fly-half was Johnny McPhillips. Their attempt to sign Elton Jantjies as a long-term replacement was blocked by the IRFU, who required them to sign an Irish-qualified player. Burns, who has an Irish grandfather, fit the bill.

In the 2018–19 season Burns made 17 appearances in the Pro14, scoring 44 points, and seven appearances in the Heineken Cup, scoring 10 points. In the 2019–20 season he made 9 appearances in the Pro14, scoring 19 points, and 7 appearances in the Heineken Cup, scoring 6 points. In November 2019, having established himself in the Ulster team and formed a strong half-back partnership with John Cooney, he agreed a renewed contract until June 2022. In 2020–21 he made ten appearances and scored four tries, sharing time with former Ireland international Ian Madigan. He re-established himself as first choice in the 2021–22 season, playing almost every game. He made his 100th appearance for Ulster against Glasgow Warriors in November 2023. He left Ulster At the end of the 2023–24 season, signing a one-year contract with Munster.

== International career ==
Burns is Irish-qualified by virtue of his paternal grandfather, Tommy, who was born in Dublin. He received his first cap in a victory against Wales in the 2020 Autumn Nations Cup, coming off the bench to replace an injured Johnny Sexton in the first half, only to be taken off for a head injury assessment in the second. He made a second substitute appearance in a defeat against England, replacing Ross Byrne, before making his first international start and scoring his first international try in a win against Georgia. He was named in the Ireland squad for the 2021 Six Nations tournament and came on as a replacement in the 21–16 defeat to Wales at the Millennium Stadium. In the dying moments of the game he attempted to kick a penalty to touch, which could have given Ireland a chance to score a potentially match-winning try from the resulting lineout, but kicked it dead, allowing Wales to hold on to win. Johnny Sexton, the player he replaced, said "Sometimes you miss and sometimes you get it and you're the hero but he had to go for it." Burns started the following match, a narrow defeat against France, appeared as a replacement in the following win against Italy, and was an unused substitute in the win against Scotland.

== Club honours ==
Gloucester

- Premiership Rugby Sevens Series: 2013
- European Rugby Challenge Cup winners: 2014–15

Hartpury College

- National Division Two South champions: 2013–14

== International honours ==
England (U18)

- European U18 Championship winners: 2012

England (U20)

- World Rugby Under 20 Championship winners: 2014
