= Olly Woodburn =

English rugby union player

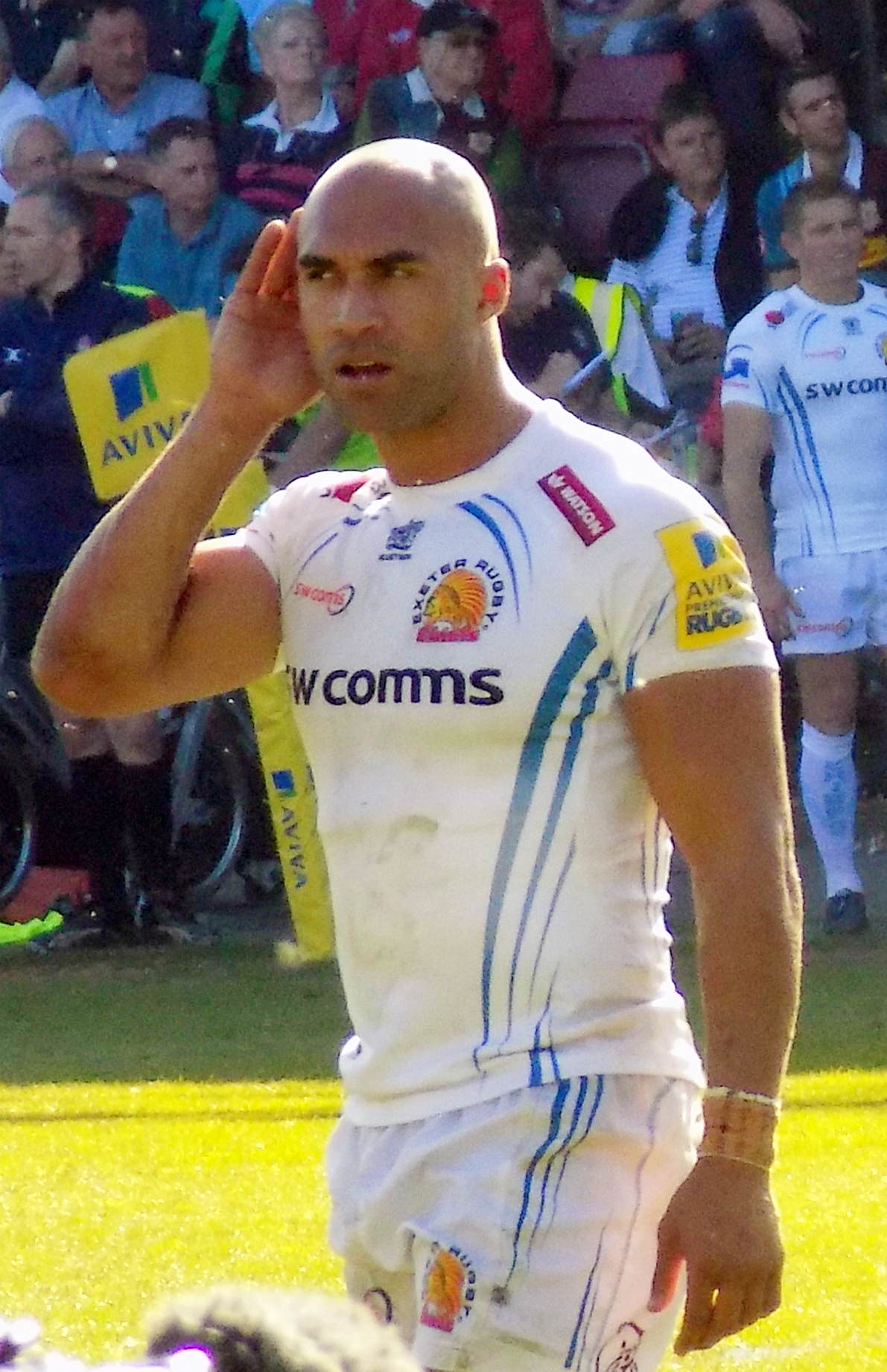
- Born: 18 November 1991 (age 34) Bristol, England
- Height: 1.88 m (6 ft 2 in)
- Weight: 100 kg (220 lb)

Rugby union career
- Position(s): Wing, Centre
Senior career
Years	Team	Apps	(Points)
2011–2015	Bath	44	(70)
2015–	Exeter Chiefs	157	(280)
- Correct as of 11 April 2023

Olly Woodburn (born 18 November 1991) is an English rugby union player. He plays for Exeter Chiefs. His regular playing positions are wing and centre.

== Bath ==
A product of the Bath Rugby academy, Woodburn made his debut for the senior side on 15 October 2011, against Newport Gwent Dragons in the 2011-12 LV= Cup. He scored a try two minutes into the game.

== Exeter ==
On 29 January 2015, Woodburn made his move to local rivals Exeter Chiefs from the 2015–16 season. With the promise of more first team action.

Woodburn enjoyed a hugely successful 2015/2016 Aviva Premiership season, helping Exeter to reach a first-ever Premiership final at Twickenham. Scoring eight tries in 24 appearances. Three of those scores came in a man-of-the-match display at home to rivals Worcester Warriors.

Woodburn's 2016–17 season marked the first English Rugby Union Premiership title for Exeter. Woodburn helped Exeter beat Wasps in the final. He also picked up the club's Player of the Year award and was nominated for the Premiership's Player of the Year accolade. A further 11 tries in 27 appearances ensured his presence as an important first team player for the Chiefs, heading into the 2017/2018 campaign.
