= Sam Harrison (rugby union) =

English rugby union player

- Born: Samuel James Harrison; 7 April 1990 (age 36) Leicester, England
- Height: 1.75 m (5 ft 9 in)
- Weight: 80 kg (12 st 8 lb; 176 lb)
- School: John Cleveland College

Rugby union career
- Position: Scrum-half
Youth career
- 1996–2004: Hinkley
- 2004–2010: Leicester Academy
Senior career
Years	Team	Apps	(Points)
2008–2020	Leicester Tigers	178	(44)
2009–2010	Nottingham	12	(10)
2008–2020	Total	190	(54)
- Correct as of 5 January 2020
International career
Years	Team	Apps	(Points)
2009	England U20	7	(0)

Samuel James Harrison (born 7 April 1990 in Leicester, England) is an English former rugby union footballer who played 178 games as a scrum-half for Leicester Tigers between 2008 and 2020.

== Club career ==
His first appearance for Leicester Tigers came as a replacement at home against Benetton Treviso in the Heineken Cup.

He was dual-registered with Nottingham for the 2009–10 season, and Harry Ellis's return from injury saw Harrison kept to a bench spot whilst the Leicester A team played in the Guinness A League.

Ellis's retirement in July 2010 resulted in Harrison's promotion to the full-time Leicester squad. Harrison played as a replacement during the 2013 Premiership final as Leicester defeated Northampton Saints.

Harrison is an ambassador for Dorothy Goodman School, a Special Educational Needs school in Hinckley, Leicestershire.

In 2016/17, his versatility earned him brief cover spells as fly half during periods of injury to both Freddie Burns and Owen Williams, even standing in as a goalkicker.

On 24 October 2019 Harrison announced his intention to retire aged only 29, to move to the Gold Coast, Australia and become a carpenter. His final appearance was on 4 January 2020 at Welford Road in a 31–18 win against Bristol Bears, Harrison had the last act of the match by clearing the ball to touch to end the game.

== International career ==
Harrison has featured in the England U16, U18 and U20 squads.
