= Dan Mugford =

English rugby union player (born 1991)

- Full name: Daniel Richard Mugford
- Date of birth: 9 October 1991 (age 33)
- Place of birth: Exeter, England
- Height: 5 ft 10 in (178 cm)
- Weight: 211 lb (96 kg)

Rugby union career
- Position(s): Fly-half
Senior career
Years	Team	Apps	(Points)
2011–13	London Scottish		()
2013–14	Plymouth Albion		()
2014–16	Nottingham		()
2016–17	Sale Sharks		()
2017–19	Plymouth Albion		()

Daniel Richard Mugford (born 9 October 1991) is an English former professional rugby union player.

== Rugby career ==
Mugsford, a fly-half, was academy player in his native Exeter. He spent most of his professional career competing in the second-tier RFU Championship, debuting for London Scottish during the 2011–12 championship season. After two seasons with the London club, Mugsford moved on to Plymouth Albion. He joined his third championship club Nottingham in 2014, then got his opportunity to compete in the top flight of English rugby when he was part of the Sale Sharks for their 2016–17 Premiership Rugby campaign, before finishing his career back in Plymouth.
