= Tommy Taylor (rugby union) =

England international rugby union player

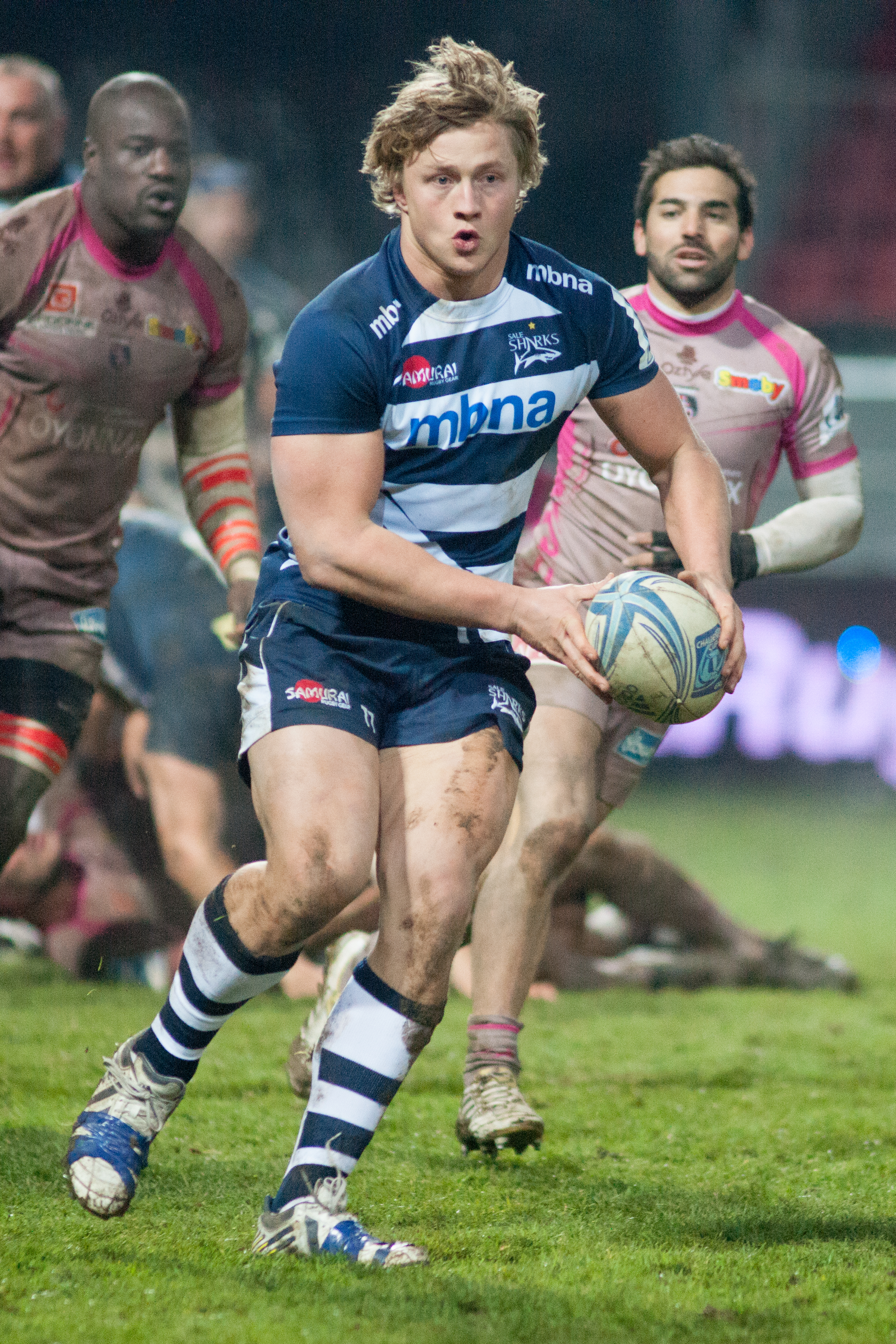
- Born: Thomas Taylor; 11 November 1991 (age 35) Macclesfield, England
- Height: 6 ft 0 in (183 cm)
- Weight: 16 st 5 lb; 229 lb (104 kg)

Rugby union career
- Position: Hooker
Senior career
Years	Team	Apps	(Points)
2010–2011	Macclesfield	14	(5)
2011–2016	Sale Sharks	106	(25)
2016–2021	Wasps	98	(45)
2021–2025	Sale Sharks	51	(0)
- Correct as of 1 June 2024
International career
Years	Team	Apps	(Points)
2016	England A	7	(10)
2016	England	1	(0)
- Correct as of 29 May 2016

Tommy Taylor (born 11 November 1991) is an English former rugby union player. A hooker, he spent his professional club career with Sale Sharks and Wasps and made one appearance for England in 2016.

== Club career ==
Taylor was educated at The King's School in Macclesfield and captained their first XV for two consecutive seasons. He made his Sale debut in 2011. Taylor started for the Sale side that lost to Harlequins in the 2013 Anglo-Welsh Cup final.

In 2016 Taylor left Sale to join Wasps and in his first season at the club he started in the 2017 Premiership final which they lost against Exeter Chiefs after extra time to finish league runners up. He also started in the 2020 Premiership final which they again lost to Exeter.

In February 2021, it was confirmed that Taylor would rejoin Sale Sharks ahead of the 2021–22 season. On 15 May 2025, Taylor announced his retirement from professional rugby at the end of the 2024-25 season.

In June 2025, Taylor became the new Forwards coach for Sedgley Park in National League 1 competition.

== International career ==
Taylor was selected for the England squad to face Barbarians in the summer of 2014. He was called up to England's 2016 Six Nations Championship squad on 13 March 2016 as injury cover for Jamie George although did not make an appearance.

On 29 May 2016 Taylor made his Test debut for England as a replacement for Dylan Hartley in a victory against Wales at Twickenham. Ultimately this was his only cap for England.

In June 2016, the month after Taylor had made his international debut, he scored two tries for England A as they defeated South Africa A at Outeniqua Park to win the series.

== Honours ==
Sale Sharks

- Anglo-Welsh Cup runner-up: 2012–2013

Wasps

- Premiership Rugby runner-up: 2016–2017, 2019–2020
