= Max Crumpton =

English rugby union player

- Born: Max Crumpton; 25 October 1993 (age 33)
- Height: 1.80 m (5 ft 11 in)
- Weight: 102 kg (16 st 1 lb)
- School: The King John School

Rugby union career
- Position: Hooker
Senior career
Years	Team	Apps	(Points)
2012–2014	Saracens	0	(0)
2013	→ Plymouth Albion	4	(0)
2013–2014	→ Harlequins	0	(0)
2014–2018	Bristol	51	(65)
2018–2020	Harlequins	20	(20)
- Correct as of 2 March 2018
International career
Years	Team	Apps	(Points)
2009	England U16s		
2011	England U18s	0	(0)
2012	England U20s	4	(0)
- Correct as of 2 March 2018

Max Crumpton (born 25 October 1993) is an English former rugby union player for Harlequins in Premiership Rugby.

He was a graduate of Saracens academy system where he progressed into the first-team squad. Crumpton spent time on loan with Plymouth Albion in the RFU Championship where he made four Championship appearances and featured in the British and Irish Cup. But it was cut short as he signed for Premiership rivals Harlequins on a loan until the end of the 2013-14 season.

On 5 March 2014, Crumpton agreed a move to Bristol who play in the RFU Championship on a two-year contract from the 2014-15 season. but was extended for two further seasons until the end of the 2017-18 season. However, on 5 February 2018, Crumpton left Bristol by mutual consent to resign with Harlequins on a permanent deal until the end of the summer 2020.

Crumpton represented England through the age-group levels. He was selected for England U20s squad to take part in the 2012 IRB Junior World Championship in South Africa starting with a match against Italy U20s on 4 June 2012.

On 1 September 2018, Crumpton scored a try, on his competitive debut for Harlequins. Quin's beat Sale at home and Crumpton's second half try topped a brilliant competitive debut for Crumpton in Premiership Rugby, playing for Harlequins.

He was forced to retire through injury in June 2020.
