= Will Chudley =

English rugby union player

- Born: William John Chudley; 17 March 1988 (age 38) Kettering, England
- Height: 1.75 m (5 ft 9 in)
- Weight: 78 kg (12 st 4 lb)

Rugby union career
- Position: Scrum-half
- Current team: Coventry
Senior career
Years	Team	Apps	(Points)
2007-2011	Bedford Blues	68	(25)
2011-2012	Newcastle Falcons	14	(5)
2012-2018	Exeter Chiefs	140	(75)
2018–2021	Bath	65	(30)
2021–2022	Worcester Warriors	28	(30)
2022–2023	Coventry	48	

William John Chudley (born 17 March 1988) is a rugby union player who played at Scrum half for Exeter Chiefs and Bath Rugby

He made his debut for Exeter against Sale Sharks on 1 September 2012.

Will joined Exeter from rivals Newcastle Falcons, Chudley joined Newcastle from Bedford Blues after catching the eye of Newcastle coach Alan Tait during Bedfords play-off semi-final defeat by Worcester in 2011.

He was in the team when Exeter Chiefs defeated Wasps to be crowned champions of the 2016-17 English Premiership.

In December 2017, he was awarded Try of the week for his week 11 try against Northampton Saints.

On 20 March 2018, it was announced that Chudley would leave Exeter to join local rivals Bath ahead of the 2018–19 season.

He would leave Bath and join Worcester Warriors on a two-year contract from the 2021–22 season.

On 5 October 2022 all Worcester players had their contacts terminated due to the liquidation of the company to which they were contracted. On 12 October 2022, Chudley signs for Coventry in the RFU Championship for the 2022–23 season.
