= Max Clark (rugby union) =

British rugby union player (born 1995)

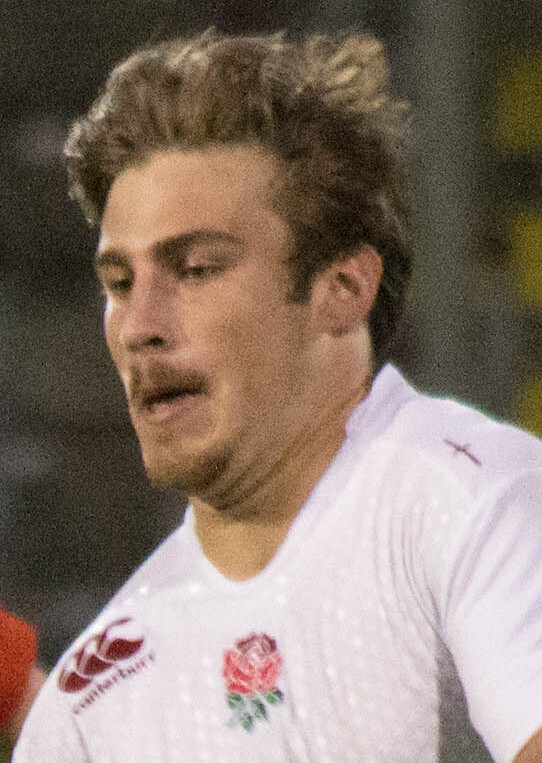
- Born: Maxwell Cameron Clark; 3 October 1995 (age 31) Bridgend, Wales
- Height: 1.90 m (6 ft 3 in)
- Weight: 103 kg (227 lb; 16 st 3 lb)
- School: Bryanston School

Rugby union career
- Position: Centre
- Current team: Falcons
Senior career
| Years | Team | Apps | (Points) |
| 2014–2022 | Bath | 88 | (50) |
| 2022–2024 | Dragons | 15 | (10) |
| 2024 | Saracens | 1 | (0) |
| 2024 | → Ampthill (D/R) | 2 | (0) |
| 2024-2026 | Newcastle Falcons | 11 | (10) |
| 2026- | Bristol Bears | | |
International career
| Years | Team | Apps | (Points) |
- England U16
- England U18
| 2015 | England U20 | 6 | (10) |
- Correct as of 20 June 2015

Max Clark (born 3 October 1995) is a professional rugby union player for Bristol Bears in the Premiership Rugby who plays at centre.

== Early life ==
Clark was born in Bridgend to a Welsh mother and English father.

== Club career ==
Clark made his league debut for Bath on 17 October 2015, in a win over Exeter Chiefs, having previously played in the Anglo-Welsh Cup.

In December 2016, Clark scored his first Aviva Premiership try in a victory against Saracens.

Ahead of the 2022–23 United Rugby Championship, Clark joined Welsh club Dragons RFC.

In July 2024, Clark joined Saracens on a pre-season trial.

He previously played for Bath in Premiership Rugby.

== International career ==
Clark has represented England at Under-16 and Under-18 level. Clark played for the England Under-20 side that finished runners up to New Zealand in the final of the 2015 Junior World Cup, scoring the opening try of the game.

Clark turned down an approach from Wales to be a member of their 2017 summer tour.
