= Ryan Mills =

English rugby union player

- Born: 30 May 1992 (age 34) Exeter, England
- Height: 1.83 m (6 ft 0 in)
- Weight: 100 kg (15 st 10 lb)

Rugby union career
- Position: Centre / Fly-Half
Senior career
| Years | Team | Apps | (Points) |
| 2012–2014 | Gloucester | 26 | (35) |
| 2012 | → Hartpury College | 5 | (38) |
| 2014–2020 | Worcester Warriors | 107 | (196) |
| 2020–2022 | Wasps | 16 | (0) |
| 2022– | Sale Sharks | 8 | (0) |
- Correct as of 24 December 2022
International career
| Years | Team | Apps | (Points) |
| 2008 | England U16 | 3 | (27) |
| 2009–2010 | England U18 | 4 | (0) |
| 2010–2012 | England U20 | 16 | (18) |

Ryan Mills (born 30 May 1992) is an English professional rugby union player. He can play at both inside centre and at fly-half.

Mills previously played for Gloucester and Worcester Warriors in Premiership Rugby. He made his first appearance for Gloucester in the 2010/11 season coming off the bench in an away match to Saracens where he kicked a conversion in a 35–12 defeat. His most memorable moment for Gloucester came in an away match to rivals Bath the following season where he successfully kicked a late penalty to gain a 14–11 win.

On 28 January 2014 it was announced that Mills would be moving to Worcester Warriors for the 2014–15 season.

In May 2017 he was invited to a training camp with the senior England squad by Eddie Jones.

On 4 March 2020, it was announced that Mills have signed for Premiership rivals Wasps from the 2020–21 season. He was made redundant along with every other Wasps player and coach when the team entered administration on 17 October 2022.

On 11 November 2022, Mills signed for Premiership rivals Sale Sharks for the rest of the 2022–23 season.
