= Gareth Evans (rugby union, born September 1991) =

English rugby union player

- Born: 19 September 1991 (age 35) Swindon, England
- Height: 1.91 m (6 ft 3 in)
- Weight: 111 kg (17 st 7 lb; 245 lb)

Rugby union career
- Position: No.8/Flanker
Senior career
Years	Team	Apps	(Points)
2011-2019	Gloucester	85	(25)
2011-2013	→Hartpury College(loan)	14	(45)
2019–2021	Ospreys	16	(5)
2021-	Leicester Tigers	0	(0)
- Correct as of 11 November 2021

Gareth Evans (born 19 September 1991) is an English retired professional rugby union player. Between 2011 and 2019 played 85 times for Gloucester, and also played for the Ospreys in Wales. He joined Leicester Tigers in August 2021, but retired without featuring in a first team game for the club in November 2021.

== Club career ==
As a junior, Gareth played for Longleaze School in Royal Wootton Bassett whose team won a National Tag Rugby tournament. Gareth also played for Wootton Bassett FC during his time there. He was picked up for the Gloucester Academy. Capable of playing blindside flanker or number eight, he was a regular in the A League side and scored a notable try in James Simpson-Daniel's Testimonial game against Russia. During his time in the academy he was also sent on loan to Hartpury College, gaining experience of playing men's rugby in National League 2 South for the 2011–12 season.

Performances for the academy saw him became a member of the first team squad for 2012–13, gaining some valuable first team experience, including playing in the Amlin Challenge Cup as well as another loan spell at Hartpury College where he scored 9 tries in just 8 appearances for the club during the later half of the 2012–13 National League 2 South season – including an incredible 5 tries in one match. On 2 April 2013, it was announced that Evans had signed a two-year contract extension to keep him at Gloucester until the end of the 2014–15 season. During the summer he was a member of the Gloucester sevens team that won the 2013 Premiership Rugby Sevens Series.

On 30 November 2014, Evans signed a further new contract extension to stay with Gloucester. In 2015 Gareth was part of the team that won the 2014–15 European Rugby Challenge Cup defeating Edinburgh 19 – 13 in the final.

On 31 May 2019, Evans left Gloucester after eight seasons with the club to join Welsh region Ospreys in the Pro14 from the 2019–20 season.

Following the 2020–21 season Evans signed for Leicester Tigers on a short-term deal, starting in August 2021, but retired in November without playing in a first team game.

== Club honours ==
Gloucester

- Premiership Rugby Sevens Series: 2013
- European Rugby Challenge Cup winners: 2014–15
