= Mitch Eadie =

English rugby union player

- Born: Mitchell Eadie; 6 July 1992 (age 34) Bristol, England
- Height: 1.91 m (6 ft 3 in)
- Weight: 105 kg (16 st 7 lb)
- Notable relative: Jim Eadie (father)

Rugby union career
- Position(s): Lock; Back Row; Number Eight
- Current team: Toronto Arrows
Senior career
Years	Team	Apps	(Points)
2010–17	Bristol Rugby	131	(185)
2011–12	→Clifton	17	(20)
2017–2020	Northampton Saints	27	(25)
2020–2022	Bristol Bears		
2023–	Toronto Arrows		
- Correct as of 19 March 2023
International career
Years	Team	Apps	(Points)
2011-13	Scotland U20	9	(0)
- Correct as of 3 April 2018

Mitch Eadie (6 July 1992) is an English professional rugby union player who currently plays for the Toronto Arrows of Major League Rugby (MLR) in North America. He has previously played for Premiership Rugby sides Bristol Bears and Northampton Saints.

== Career ==
Son of Bristol Rovers F.C. Jim Eadie, Mitch nearly followed in his father's footstep with the round ball game but soon developed a keen interest in the oval ball and impressed Bristol Rugby coach Liam Middleton.

Joining Bristol aged just 18, the utility forward has since racked up 131 appearances for the West Country side, scoring 37 tries in that time.

Qualifying for Scotland U20, Eadie played for the age-group side nine times between 2011 and 2013.

Eadie secured a regular place within the Bristol starting line up in years to come while the side played in the RFU Championship, scooping Players' Player of the Year from his peers at the club on two occasions.

He helped the side secure promotion to the Aviva Premiership after trying for seven years at the end of the 2015/16 season.

Despite their promotion to the Premiership, Bristol struggled in the 2016/17 season and after being relegated would be playing in the RFU Championship again in 2017/18 despite Eadie and his side's best efforts. The side knew they faced relegation in round 20 of this season's Aviva Premiership but Eadie was determined to battle on and perform for the Bristol fans in the season's closing games, stating the players "owe[d] it to the fans".

It was announced on 2 February 2017 that Eadie would leave his long-term home of Bristol to join Aviva Premiership side Northampton Saints for the 2017/18 season alongside fellow Bristol Rugby player Jamal Ford-Robinson.

On 29 January 2020, it was announced Eadie would be returning to Bristol Bears, who had since returned to the top flight, on a two-year deal from the 2020-21 season.
