= Kane Palma-Newport =

English rugby union player

- Born: 26 October 1990 (age 36) Bath, Somerset, England
- Height: 1.89 m (6 ft 2 in)
- Weight: 127 kg (280 lb)

Rugby union career
- Position: Prop
- Current team: US Colomiers
Senior career
Years	Team	Apps	(Points)
2011–2018	Bath	86	(25)
2011–2012	→ Yorkshire Carnegie	6	(10)
2018–	US Colomiers	37	(0)
- Correct as of 11 April 2020

Kane Palma-Newport (born 26 October 1990) is an English rugby union player, who plays as a prop for French side US Colomiers in Pro D2.

A product of the Bath Rugby academy, Palma-Newport made his Aviva Premiership debut as a substitute against Newcastle in the 2010–11 season.

He spent a brief period on loan at Leeds Carnegie during the 2011–12 season, scoring two tries in six appearances. His loan came to an end when he was recalled by Bath.
