= Greg Garner =

- Born: Greg Garner; 26 June 1980 (age 46) Coventry, England

Rugby union career
Refereeing career
| Years | Competition | Apps |
- English Premiership
| – | Heineken Cup | |
| – | European Challenge Cup | |
| – | Six Nations | |
| – | Rugby Championship | |
| – | Test matches | |

Greg Garner (born 26 June 1980) is an international rugby union referee who represents the Rugby Football Union.

He began officiating in 2000 at local rugby clubs in Coventry before joining the elite referee development at the RFU in 2008, and was part of the touch judge team in the 2008–09 English Premiership. In 2010, Garner was part of the IRB referee panel for the 2011 IRB Junior World Championship in Italy – refereeing 4 fixtures, before refereeing the final of the 2012 IRB Junior World Championship between hosts South Africa and New Zealand.

He made his first appearance at Test match level during the 2012 end-of-year rugby union tests, where he officiated the Italy vs. Tonga match.
