= Mike Haywood (rugby union) =

English rugby union player

- Born: 10 November 1991 (age 35) Southend-on-Sea, United Kingdom
- Height: 1.80 m (5 ft 11 in)
- Weight: 105 kg (16 st 7 lb)

Rugby union career
- Position: Hooker
- Current team: Northampton Saints
Senior career
Years	Team	Apps	(Points)
2011 -	Northampton	236	(150)
- Correct as of 3 April 2018
International career
Years	Team	Apps	(Points)
2012-2014	England U20		

Mike Haywood (born 10 November 1991) is an English rugby union player who used to play for Aviva Premiership side Northampton Saints. His position was at hooker. He is currently a coach at St Joseph's College in Ipswich and Colchester Rugby Club

Haywood was a product of the Northampton Saints academy and was given a two-year contract with the side in 2011. In 2013, Haywood renewed his contract with the Saints.

The hooker was instrumental in some of Saints' biggest successes including starting in the 2014 Aviva Premiership final and the European Challenge Cup final, as well as featuring in the Midlands side's Aviva Premiership semi-final win over local rivals Leicester Tigers and Saints' win that ended Ulster Rugby's long time European home record.

Most recently Haywood helped Saints to secure a European Rugby Champions Cup place for the 2017/18 season as they fought off Stade Français Paris in the European Champions Cup play-off final. In October 2017, he was awarded Try of the week for his week 5 try against Harlequins.
