= Freddie Burns =

England rugby union player (born 1990)

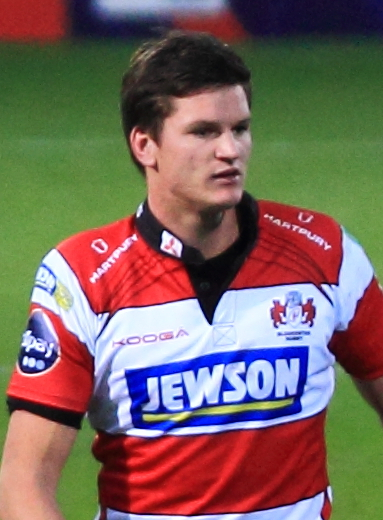
- Burns representing Gloucester during the 2011–12 Heineken Cup
- Born: Freddie Spencer Burns; 13 May 1990 (age 36) Bath, England
- Height: 183 cm (6 ft 0 in)
- Weight: 90 kg (14 st 2 lb; 198 lb)
- School: Beechen Cliff School
- Notable relative: Billy Burns (brother)

Rugby union career
- Position(s): Fly-half, Fullback
Youth career
- Oldfield Old Boys R.F.C.
Senior career
Years	Team	Apps	(Points)
2008–2009	Cinderford	16	(67)
2008–2014	Gloucester	131	(1,216)
2014–2017	Leicester Tigers	76	(598)
2017–2020	Bath	66	(356)
2020–2021	Shoki Shuttles	7	(133)
2021–2023	Leicester Tigers	39	(194)
2023	Highlanders	9	(18)
2024–2025	Shoki Shuttles	28	(316)
2025	CS Dinamo București		
2008–2025	Total	372	(2,898)
- Correct as of 2 October 2025
International career
Years	Team	Apps	(Points)
2009–2010	England U20	21	(211)
2010–2012	England Saxons	11	(125)
2012–2014	England	5	(57)
- Correct as of 12 March 2023

Freddie Spencer Burns (born 13 May 1990) is an former English professional rugby union player and current kicking coach of Leicester Tigers. Burns played over 100 times for Gloucester between 2007 and 2014, and over 100 times for Leicester Tigers across two spells, he also represented Bath in Premiership Rugby. He has also played for Toyota Industries Shuttles in Japan. Burns played five times for England between 2012 and 2014, including beating the All Blacks in 2012. In June 2022, he kicked the winning drop goal in the final minute of the Premiership final for Leicester against Saracens.

Burns joined the Highlanders (New Zealand) in Super Rugby from February 2023.

== Club career ==
=== Gloucester ===
On 6 June 2008, Burns was announced as part of the intake to Gloucester Rugby's academy, joining from Bath Rugby's academy.

On 30 June 2009, Gloucester Rugby announced that Burns was one of a number of academy players to sign senior contracts.

In January 2010, he re-signed with Gloucester, committing himself until the end of the 2011/12 season.

His contract was renewed in the spring of 2012.

Burns came in for Gloucester in the game against Biarritz Olympique and got a conversion. In the next game he made his first start at fullback at Kingsholm against Australia. In this game he scored a try. In the following match he was once again selected at fullback and he scored two penalties against the Cardiff Blues. However, next game Olly Morgan replaced Burns at fullback and Burns made a start at fly-half. Burns then scored all of his club's points with two converted tries. Burns has since played many games at fly-half and fullback, including an April 2010 performance against Saracens. In this game he was named the man of the match as a reward for his outstanding kicking from hand, goal kicking and composure under the high ball. The highlight of this match was when Burns chipped over a rushing Saracen defence allowing Charlie Sharples to score a vital try in the corner.

=== Leicester ===
Burns joined Leicester Tigers at the end of the 2013–14 season.

=== Bath ===
On 14 February 2017, Burns signed for hometown club Bath ahead of the 2017–18 season.

In a Champions Cup match on 13 October 2018, a blunder by Burns cost Bath their match against Toulouse. Having got behind the posts, Burns started to celebrate instead of immediately touching down for a try. However, a Toulouse player, Maxime Medard managed to knock the ball out of his hand.

=== Shokki Shuttles ===
On 1 May 2020, it was announced that Burns would leave Bath at the end of his contract to join Japanese side Toyota Jido Shokki.

=== Return to Leicester ===
Burns returned to Leicester Tigers ahead of the 2021–22 season. With George Ford called up for England Burns started every match for Leicester during February 2022 leading to him being awarded the Gallagher Player of the Month award. His drop goal in the 79th minute won Leicester the 2022 Gallagher Premiership final against Saracens and earned his first major title. Burns had earlier come on as a replacement for the injured George Ford.

=== Highlanders ===
On 22 January 2023, Leicester Tigers announced that the club had agreed terms with Burns for an early release from his contract with the club – effective from February 2023 – to allow him to continue his career in Super Rugby. The next day, the Highlanders announced that the franchise had signed Burns for the 2023 Super Rugby Pacific season.

== International career ==
Burns represented his country at under 20 level and played in the 2010 IRB Junior World Championship in Argentina in 2010.

Burns represented England Saxons against Ireland and Scotland A, and his form earned him selection into the England EPS squad for the Barbarians game on 27 May 2012.

On 1 December 2012, Burns made his England debut, replacing Owen Farrell during the 38–21 victory over New Zealand, during which he scored his first international points with two penalties. Burns joined the 2013 England tour and played at number 10 vs Argentina in both tests. He scored two penalties and three out of four conversions in the first game when the team won 32–3, and also scored his first England try. He started the first test against New Zealand at Eden Park in June 2014, kicking 12 points in a 20-15 England loss.

=== International tries ===
As of 7 July 2019

Try	Opposing team	Location	Venue	Competition	Date	Result	Score
1	Argentina	Buenos Aires, Argentina	Estadio José Amalfitani	2013 mid-year rugby union tests	15 June 2013	Win	51 - 26

== Personal life ==
Born in Bath, Burns is a former pupil of Beechen Cliff School in the city. His younger brother Billy Burns, who plays for Ulster and Ireland. Burns is Irish-qualified by virtue of his paternal grandfather, Tommy, who was born in Dublin.

In an interview with BT Sportat Silverstone, Burns revealed he is named after Freddie Spencer the two time 500cc World Champion.

In an interview in May 2023, Burns criticised the Coronation of Charles III and Camilla, opining that while he was a proud Englishman, the money spent on the event could have been better utilised to assist people struggling during the United Kingdom's cost of living crisis.

== Honours ==
=== Gloucester ===
- Anglo-Welsh Cup: 2010-11

=== Leicester ===
- Premiership: 2021-22
- Anglo-Welsh Cup: 2016-17
