= Charlie Sharples =

England international rugby union player

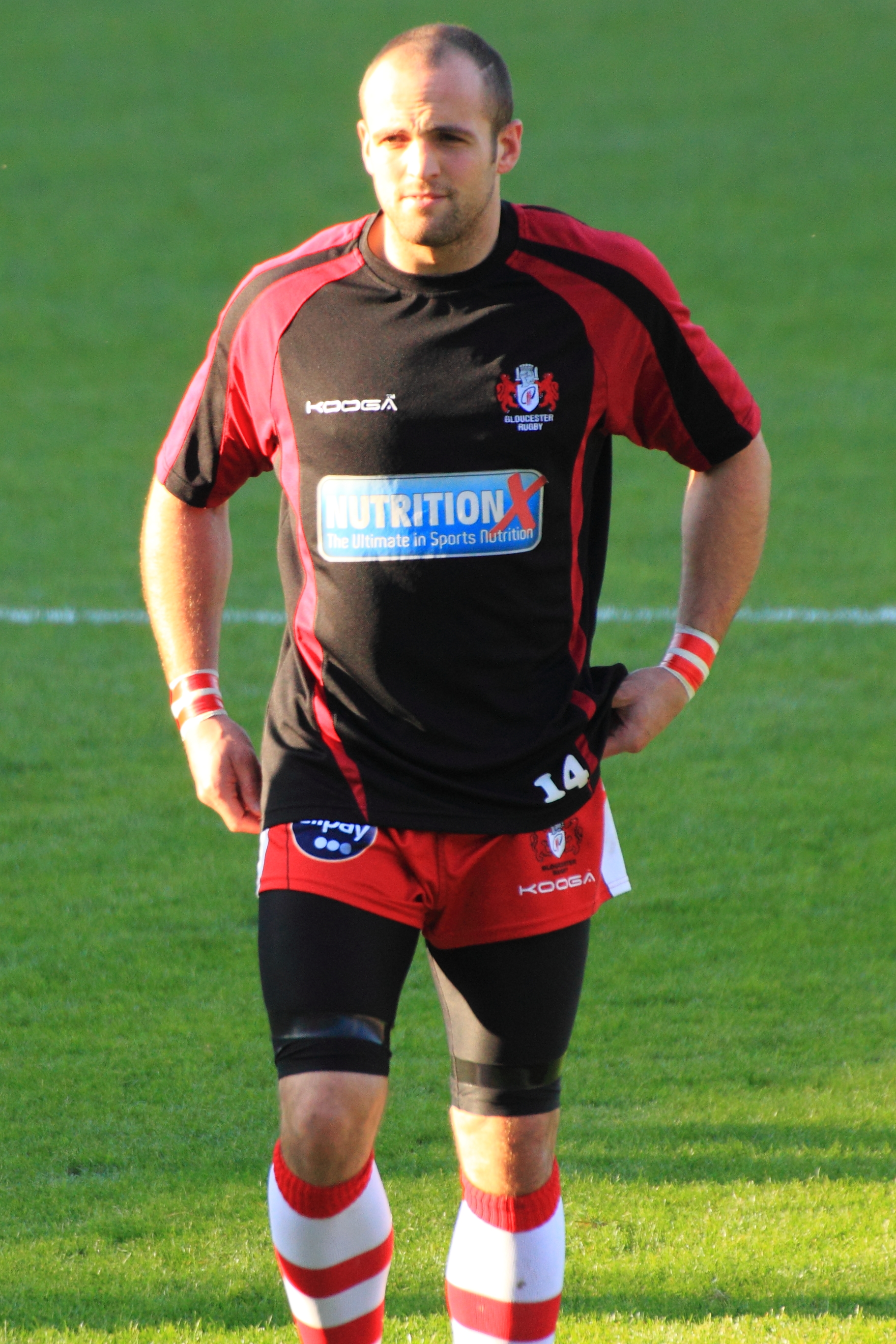
- Born: 17 August 1989 (age 37) Hong Kong
- Height: 1.81 m (5 ft 11 in)
- Weight: 91 kg (14 st 5 lb; 201 lb)
- School: St Peter's High School, Gloucester; Wycliffe College

Rugby union career
- Position: Wing
Senior career
Years	Team	Apps	(Points)
2007–	Gloucester	266	(455)
2007–2010	Moseley (D-R)	32	(60)
- Correct as of 28 July 2020
International career
Years	Team	Apps	(Points)
2011	England Saxons	3	(10)
2011–2012	England	4	(10)

Charlie Sharples (born 17 August 1989) is a former English rugby union footballer, who last played in the Aviva Premiership for Gloucester. He plays as a wing.

== Club career ==
Sharples was born in Hong Kong. As a former Gloucestershire district athlete, Sharples ran a time of 11.30 seconds over the 100m distance at the age of 17. He also ran 40m in a time of 4.82 seconds at the England RWC training camp in 2011, the fastest time recorded in the England squad. He made his début for Gloucester during the 2007/08 season coming on as a substitute against London Irish at Kingsholm. He made his first start for Gloucester against Sale Sharks at Edgeley Park.

Sharples was dual registered with Moseley for both the 2007–08 and 2008–09 seasons. Sharples scored 18 tries in the 2010/11 season including four tries against the Newport-Gwent Dragons.

== International career ==
Sharples made his England debut against Wales in a World Cup warm-up match on 6 August 2011. He scored two tries, his only international points, in a 54–12 win over Fiji on 10 November 2012. He also started the following week against Australia, which proved to be his fourth and final appearance for England.
