= 2013 Premiership Rugby Sevens Series =

2013 J.P Morgan Asset Management Premiership Rugby 7s Series
- Countries: England
- Champions: Gloucester 7s (1st title)
- Runners-up: Leicester Tigers 7s
- Matches played: 25
- Tries scored: 157 (average 6.3 per match)

The 2013 Premiership Rugby Sevens Series (styled for sponsorship reasons as the 2013 J.P Morgan Asset Management Premiership Rugby 7s Series) was the fourth Rugby Union 7-a-side competition for the twelve 2013–14 Aviva Premiership Clubs. The group stages were run on 1–3 August 2013 and the final at the Recreation Ground on 9 August 2013.

== Format ==
The twelve Premiership Clubs were split into 3 Groups – A, B and C based upon geographical location – with each group playing on consecutive days at the beginning of August. Each team in the group played each other once, to the International Rugby Board Laws of the Game - 7s Variations. Based on the result, teams received:

- 4 points for a win
- 2 points for a draw
- 1 bonus point for a loss by seven points or less
- 1 bonus point for scoring four or more tries in a match

Following all the games, the winner and runner up in each group progressed to the Final Stage. In the final, the 6 teams (3 Winners and 3 Runners up) were split into 2 pools. Again teams played each other once and points were awarded based on the match result. Following the culmination of this stage the winners of each pool progressed to the final, the winner of that game being declared the champions.

== Group stage ==
The group draw was based on geographical location of the clubs playing. Premiership Rugby confirmed the match times on 4 July 2013.

Group A	Group B	Group C
Bath 7s	Leicester Tigers 7s	Harlequins 7s
Exeter Chiefs 7s	Newcastle Falcons 7s	London Irish 7s
Gloucester 7s	Northampton Saints 7s	London Wasps 7s
Worcester Warriors 7s	Sale Sharks 7s	Saracens 7s

=== Group A ===
Played at Kingsholm, Gloucester on Thursday 1 August 2013. The attendance on the night was nearly 13,000.

Pos	Team	Pld	W	D	L	F	A	TF	TA	TB	LB	Pts
1	Worcester Warriors 7s	3	3	0	0	84	50	13	8	3	0	15
2	Gloucester 7s	3	2	0	1	76	69	12	11	2	0	10
3	Bath 7s	3	1	0	2	53	73	9	12	1	0	5
4	Exeter Chief 7s	3	0	0	3	53	74	9	12	0	1	1
Green background is the pool winner and qualifies for the Final Stage. Blue background is the runner-up and also qualifies for the Final Stage. Updated 2 August 2013 — source: Premiership Rugby

1 August 2013
19:15

Bath 7s	19 – 29	Gloucester 7s
	Report

Kingsholm

1 August 2013
19:40

Exeter Chiefs 7s	17 – 26	Worcester Warriors 7s
	Report

Kingsholm

1 August 2013
20:10

Exeter Chiefs 7s	17 – 20	Bath 7s
	Report

Kingsholm

1 August 2013
20:35

Gloucester 7s	19 – 31	Worcester Warriors 7s
	Report

Kingsholm

1 August 2013
21:05

Bath 7s	14 – 27	Worcester Warriors 7s
	Report

Kingsholm

1 August 2013
21:30

Exeter Chiefs 7s	19 – 28	Gloucester 7s
	Report

Kingsholm

=== Group B ===
Played at Franklin's Gardens, Northampton on Friday 2 August 2013. The attendance on the night was 9,432.

Pos	Team	Pld	W	D	L	F	A	TF	TA	TB	LB	Pts
1	Newcastle Falcons 7s	3	3	0	0	59	37	10	7	1	0	13
2	Leicester Tigers 7s	3	2	0	1	37	31	7	5	0	0	8
3	Sale Sharks 7s	3	1	0	2	36	44	6	8	1	2	7
4	Northampton Saints 7s	3	0	0	3	49	69	9	12	2	2	4
Green background is the pool winner and qualifies for the Final Stage. Blue background is the runner-up and also qualifies for the Final Stage. Updated 3 August 2013 — source: Premiership Rugby

2 August 2013
19:15

Newcastle Falcons 7s	28 – 22	Northampton Saints 7s
	Report

Franklin's Gardens

2 August 2013
19:40

Leicester Tigers 7s	10 – 7	Sale Sharks 7s
	Report

Franklin's Gardens

2 August 2013
20:10

Leicester Tigers 7s	10 – 19	Newcastle Falcons 7s
	Report

Franklin's Gardens

2 August 2013
20:35

Northampton Saints 7s	22 – 24	Sale Sharks 7s
	Report

Franklin's Gardens

2 August 2013
21:05

Newcastle Falcons 7s	12 – 5	Sale Sharks 7s
	Report

Franklin's Gardens

2 August 2013
21:30

Leicester Tigers 7s	17 – 5	Northampton Saints 7s
	Report

Franklin's Gardens

=== Group C ===
Played at Allianz Park, Barnet, London on Saturday 3 August 2013.

Pos	Team	Pld	W	D	L	F	A	TF	TA	TB	LB	Pts
1	Harlequins 7s	3	3	0	0	92	59	14	9	3	0	15
2	Saracens 7s	3	2	0	1	66	53	10	9	1	1	10
3	London Irish 7s	3	1	0	2	62	85	9	13	1	0	5
4	London Wasps 7s	3	0	0	3	55	78	9	11	0	2	2
Green background is the pool winner and qualifies for the Final Stage. Blue background is the runner-up and also qualifies for the Final Stage. Updated 4 August 2013 — source: Premiership Rugby

3 August 2013
19:15

London Irish 7s	12 – 24	Saracens 7s
	Report

Allianz Park

3 August 2013
19:40

Harlequins 7s	26 – 19	London Wasps 7s
	Report

Allianz Park

3 August 2013
20:10

Harlequins 7s	42 – 19	London Irish 7s
	Report

Allianz Park

3 August 2013
20:35

Saracens 7s	21 – 17	London Wasps 7s
	Report

Allianz Park

3 August 2013
21:05

London Irish 7s	31 – 19	London Wasps 7s
	Report

Allianz Park

3 August 2013
21:30

Harlequins 7s	24 – 21	Saracens 7s
	Report

Allianz Park

== Final stage ==
The Final Stage was played at The Recreation Ground, Bath on Friday 9 August 2013 in front of a sell out crowd.

For the finals, the 6 qualified teams were split into two pools of three teams. Scoring was the same as in the previous rounds (4 points for a win, etc.), and the winner of each pool progressed to the final.

=== Pool A ===
Pos	Team	Pld	W	D	L	F	A	TF	TA	TB	LB	Pts
1	Leicester Tigers 7s	2	2	0	0	54	29	8	5	1	0	9
2	Harlequins 7s	2	1	0	1	46	33	8	5	1	1	6
3	Worcester Warriors 7s	2	0	0	2	26	64	4	10	0	0	0
Green background is the pool winner and qualifies for the Final. Updated 12 August 2013 — source: Premiership Rugby

9 August 2013
19:00

Worcester Warriors 7s	12 – 35	Leicester Tigers 7s

The Recreation Ground

9 August 2013
19:50

Leicester Tigers 7s	19 – 17	Harlequins 7s

The Recreation Ground

9 August 2013
20:40

Worcester Warriors 7s	14 – 29	Harlequins 7s

The Recreation Ground

=== Pool B ===
Pos	Team	Pld	W	D	L	F	A	TF	TA	TB	LB	Pts
1	Gloucester 7s	2	2	0	0	38	14	6	2	0	0	8
2	Saracens 7s	2	1	0	1	33	32	5	6	0	1	5
3	Newcastle Falcons 7s	2	0	0	2	15	40	3	6	0	1	1
Green background is the pool winner and qualifies for the Final. Updated 12 August 2013 — source: Premiership Rugby

9 August 2013
19:25

Gloucester 7s	21 – 0	Newcastle Falcons 7s

The Recreation Ground

9 August 2013
20:15

Newcastle Falcons 7s	15 – 19	Saracens 7s

The Recreation Ground

9 August 2013
21:05

Gloucester 7s	17 – 14	Saracens 7s

The Recreation Ground

=== Final ===
The final was contested by the winners of the two finals pools. In a slight difference to the rest of the series, the final was played in two halves of 10 minutes (instead of 7 minutes), with a slightly longer half-time.

9 August 2013
21:35

Gloucester 7s	24 – 17	Leicester Tigers 7s
	Report

The Recreation Ground

- Gloucester 7s won the 2013 Premiership Rugby Sevens Series and with it qualification to the inaugural World Club 7s at Twickenham.

== Broadcasting ==
The competition, including the final, will be broadcast live on the new BT Sport channel. The channel launched on Thursday 1 August, the first day of the competition. Highlights of the 2013 competition were shown on STV in Scotland.
