= 2023–24 Premiership Rugby =

Rugby union competition in England

- Countries: England
- Number of teams: 10
- Date: 13 October 2023 – 8 June 2024
- Champions: Northampton Saints (2nd title)
- Runners-up: Bath
- Relegated: No relegation
- Matches played: 93
- Attendance: 1,428,276 (average 15,358 per match)
- Highest attendance: 81,669 – Northampton v Bath, 8 June 2024
- Lowest attendance: 3,821 – Newcastle v Gloucester, 20 October 2023
- Tries scored: 647 (average 7 per match)
- Top point scorer: (England) Henry Slade (Exeter) – 152 points
- Top try scorer: (England) Ollie Sleightholme (Northampton) – 14 tries

Official website
- www.premiershiprugby.com

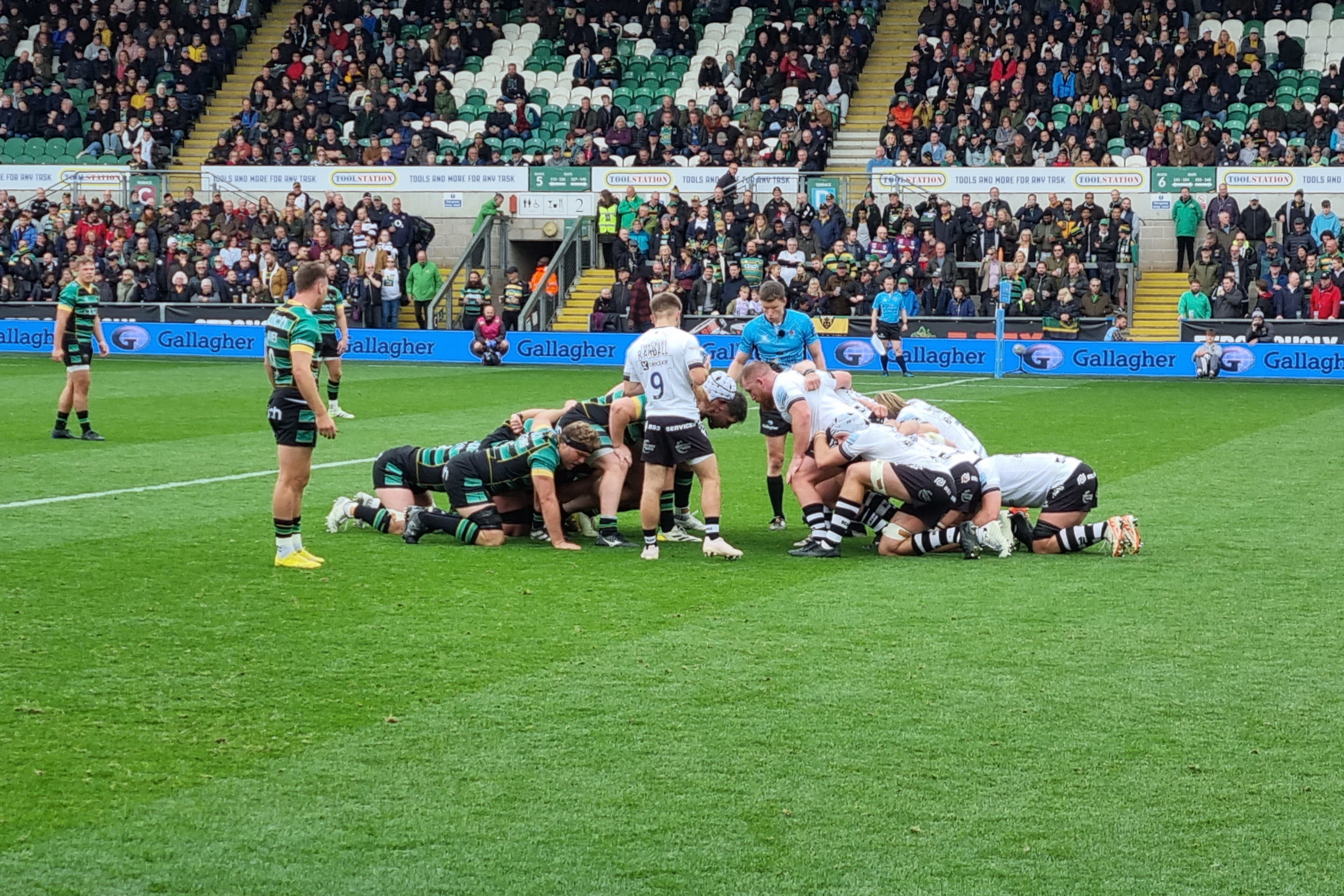
Northampton Saints vs Bristol Bears at Franklin’s Gardens, 21 October 2023

The 2023–24 Premiership Rugby is the 37th season of the top flight of English domestic rugby union competition and the sixth to be sponsored by Gallagher. The competition was broadcast by TNT Sports for the eleventh year of their broadcast deal, with six league season games and the final also simulcast free-to-air by ITV. Highlights of each weekend's games were shown on ITV, with extended highlights on TNT Sports. This was the first season to be aired on TNT Sports since it rebranded from BT Sport in July 2023.

The reigning champions entering the season are Saracens, who claimed their 6th league title after winning the 2023 final. No team was promoted from the 2022–23 RFU Championship, as the champions were not able to satisfy the eligibility criteria required to enter the league.

== Rule changes ==
The 2023–24 season is set to be the final year under the current Premiership competition structure, before a planned 're-launch' taking place ahead of the 2024–25 season. As a result, the moratorium on relegation to the RFU Championship will cease and be replaced by a play-off between the team placed last in the Premiership and the team placed first in the Championship. Promotion from the Championship is therefore also set to be reinstated, subject to the winning club successfully fulfilling the RFU minimum standards criteria.

This season is also the last year of the league's temporary salary cap reduction, implemented to keep the participating clubs financially solvent following the COVID-19 pandemic, with further regulatory changes set to be made for the 2024–25 season.

== Teams ==
The competition will feature 10 of the 13 teams which began the 2022–23 season. Two of the other three – Wasps and Worcester Warriors – were previously confirmed to be excluded from competing in the 2023–24 season, after both clubs were expelled from the league, upon entering into administration in 2022. The final team – London Irish – had originally been due to compete, but the club was also expelled in summer 2023, prior to the start of the season, because of insufficient funds to continue operating. As a result, the 2023–24 season is the first time the top flight of English rugby has featured just 10 teams since the 1995–96 season.

For the second consecutive year, the top team in the Championship was ineligible for promotion to the Premiership, after 2022–23 Championship winners Jersey Reds failed to meet the minimum standards criteria to join the competition.

=== London Irish administration ===
On 15 May 2023, London Irish were warned by the RFU that they faced suspension from the Premiership ahead of the beginning of the 2023–24 season, unless they met a deadline of 30 May to complete a takeover by new ownership, due to concerns about the club's finances. On 31 May, the RFU granted the club a one-week extension, on the condition that evidence of funding for the 2023–24 season, from either the existing benefactor or the prospective new owners, was provided by 6 June. On 2 June, HMRC issued a winding-up petition against the club, in response to unpaid tax. On 6 June, after failing to provide proof of funds for the upcoming season, London Irish were officially suspended from the Premiership. The following day, the club filed for administration, resulting in automatic relegation under RFU regulations.

=== Stadiums and locations ===
2023-24 Gallagher Premiership Teams

Club	Director of Rugby/ Head coach	Captain	Kit supplier	Stadium	Capacity	City/Area
Bath	(South Africa) Johann van Graan	(England) Ben Spencer	Castore	The Recreation Ground	14,509	Bath, Somerset
Bristol Bears	(Samoa) Pat Lam	(England) Fitz Harding	O'Neills	Ashton Gate	27,000	Bristol
Exeter Chiefs	(England) Rob Baxter (England) Ali Hepher	(Wales) Dafydd Jenkins	Samurai	Sandy Park	15,600	Exeter, Devon
Gloucester	(England) George Skivington	(England) Lewis Ludlow	Oxen	Kingsholm	16,115	Gloucester, Gloucestershire
Harlequins	(Australia) Billy Millard	(South Africa) Stephan Lewies	Castore	Twickenham Stoop^{1}	14,800	Twickenham, Greater London
Leicester Tigers	(Australia) Dan McKellar	(Argentina) Julián Montoya	Samurai	Welford Road	25,849	Leicester, Leicestershire
Newcastle Falcons	(England) Alex Codling^{2} (England) Steve Diamond^{2}	(England) Callum Chick	Macron	Kingston Park	10,200	Newcastle upon Tyne, Tyne and Wear
Northampton Saints	(England) Phil Dowson (England) Sam Vesty	(England) Lewis Ludlam	Macron	Franklin's Gardens	15,200	Northampton, Northamptonshire
Sale Sharks	(England) Alex Sanderson (England) Paul Deacon	(England) Ben Curry	Macron	Salford Community Stadium	12,000	Salford, Greater Manchester
Saracens	(Ireland) Mark McCall (England) Joe Shaw	(England) Owen Farrell	Castore	StoneX Stadium^{3}	10,500	Hendon, Greater London

Notes

- ^1 – Harlequins would also play two home games at Twickenham Stadium in December 2023 and April 2024, respectively.
- ^2 – On 19 January 2024, Newcastle announced that head coach Alex Codling would be stepping down from his role. Forwards coach Micky Ward served as interim head coach for one Premiership match at the end of the month, before Steve Diamond took over for the remainder of the season – in the position of consultant director of rugby – from the beginning of February.
- ^3 – Saracens would also play one home game at Tottenham Hotspur Stadium in March 2024.

== Table ==
Pos	Team	Pld	W	D	L	PF	PA	PD	TF	TA	TB	LB	Pts	Qualification
1	Northampton Saints (C)	18	12	0	6	555	453	+102	76	59	10	2	60	Play-offs & Berth in the 2024–25 Champions Cup
2	Bath (RU)	18	11	0	7	511	413	+98	70	53	11	5	60	Play-offs & Berth in the 2024–25 Champions Cup
3	Sale Sharks (SF)	18	12	0	6	410	384	+26	55	51	7	1	56	Play-offs & Berth in the 2024–25 Champions Cup
4	Saracens (SF)	18	11	0	7	522	387	+135	71	52	10	2	56	Play-offs & Berth in the 2024–25 Champions Cup
5	Bristol Bears	18	11	0	7	591	447	+144	80	61	8	2	54	Berth in the 2024–25 Champions Cup
6	Harlequins	18	9	0	9	486	520	−34	71	70	11	4	51	Berth in the 2024–25 Champions Cup
7	Exeter Chiefs	18	10	0	8	512	437	+75	73	61	9	1	50	Berth in the 2024–25 Champions Cup
8	Leicester Tigers	18	9	0	9	435	408	+27	55	51	5	4	45	Berth in the 2024–25 Champions Cup
9	Gloucester	18	5	0	13	400	595	−195	54	84	8	4	32	Berth in the 2024–25 Challenge Cup
10	Newcastle Falcons	18	0	0	18	251	629	−378	30	93	1	4	5	Berth in the 2024–25 Challenge Cup

Updated to match(es) played on 18 May 2024. Source: Rugby Football Union; Premiership Rugby; BBC Sport
Rules for classification: Tiebreakers for teams tied on points: 1) Number of matches won; 2) Difference between points for and against; 3) Total number of points for; 4) Aggregate number of points scored in matches between tied teams; 5) Number of matches won excluding the first match, then the second and so on until the tie is settled.
(C) Champions; (RU) Runners-up; (SF) Losing semi-finalist

=== Round-by-round progression ===
The grid below shows each team's progression throughout the season, indicating their points total (and league table position) at the end of every round:

Team Progression
Team	R1	R2	R3	R4	R5	R6	R7	R8	R9	R10	R11	R12	R13	R14	R15	R16	R17	R18
Northampton Saints	1 (7th)	3 (7th)	7 (7th)	11 (5th)	16 (4th)	16 (6th)	21 (6th)	25 (5th)	30 (3rd)	34 (1st)	39 (1st)	44 (1st)	44 (1st)	49 (1st)	54 (1st)	55 (1st)	60 (1st)	60 (1st)
Bath	5 (2nd)	10 (1st)	11 (1st)	12 (4th)	17 (3rd)	21 (2nd)	22 (4th)	27 (2nd)	32 (1st)	32 (4th)	36 (3rd)	37 (3rd)	42 (2nd)	44 (2nd)	49 (2nd)	50 (3rd)	55 (3rd)	60 (2nd)
Sale Sharks	4 (5th)	8 (4th)	8 (6th)	13 (3rd)	18 (2nd)	23 (1st)	27 (1st)	27 (1st)	31 (2nd)	32 (3rd)	32 (5th)	32 (7th)	32 (8th)	37 (8th)	42 (6th)	47 (6th)	52 (4th)	56 (3rd)
Saracens	0 (10th)	0 (10th)	4 (9th)	9 (7th)	14 (6th)	19 (4th)	24 (2nd)	25 (4th)	26 (5th)	31 (5th)	31 (6th)	36 (4th)	41 (3rd)	42 (3rd)	47 (3rd)	51 (2nd)	56 (2nd)	56 (4th)
Bristol Bears	4 (4th)	9 (2nd)	10 (3rd)	10 (6th)	10 (7th)	11 (7th)	12 (8th)	17 (8th)	21 (7th)	21 (8th)	25 (8th)	30 (8th)	35 (6th)	40 (5th)	45 (4th)	49 (4th)	49 (7th)	54 (5th)
Harlequins	1 (6th)	5 (6th)	9 (4th)	14 (2nd)	19 (1st)	19 (5th)	21 (5th)	26 (3rd)	26 (6th)	31 (6th)	36 (2nd)	37 (2nd)	37 (5th)	42 (4th)	44 (5th)	49 (5th)	50 (6th)	51 (6th)
Exeter Chiefs	5 (1st)	5 (5th)	10 (2nd)	15 (1st)	15 (5th)	19 (3rd)	23 (3rd)	23 (6th)	28 (4th)	33 (2nd)	35 (4th)	35 (5th)	40 (4th)	40 (6th)	40 (7th)	45 (7th)	50 (5th)	50 (7th)
Leicester Tigers	0 (9th)	1 (9th)	5 (8th)	5 (9th)	6 (9th)	10 (9th)	15 (7th)	20 (7th)	20 (8th)	25 (7th)	29 (7th)	33 (6th)	35 (7th)	39 (7th)	39 (8th)	40 (8th)	40 (8th)	45 (8th)
Gloucester	5 (3rd)	9 (3rd)	9 (5th)	9 (8th)	9 (8th)	11 (8th)	11 (9th)	12 (9th)	14 (9th)	16 (9th)	17 (9th)	22 (9th)	26 (9th)	26 (9th)	27 (9th)	27 (9th)	27 (9th)	32 (9th)
Newcastle Falcons	0 (8th)	1 (8th)	2 (10th)	2 (10th)	2 (10th)	3 (10th)	4 (10th)	4 (10th)	4 (10th)	4 (10th)	4 (10th)	4 (10th)	4 (10th)	5 (10th)	5 (10th)	5 (10th)	5 (10th)	5 (10th)
Updated: 18 May 2024

Key
Win	Draw	Loss

== Regular season ==
The regular season fixtures were announced on 18 July 2023. They are due to play out over the course of 18 rounds, with each round consisting of five matches.

The league began on 13 October 2023, with the full season schedule staggered to start and finish one month later than the 2022–23 season, in order to reduce fixture overlap with the 2023 Rugby World Cup, which reaches the knockout stages on the same weekend as the Premiership's opening round. A revamped version of the Premiership Rugby Cup, involving teams from the RFU Championship, was also announced to take place before the beginning of the Premiership season. The Premiership season will pause for eight weeks between the ends of January 2023 and March 2023, to avoid any fixture clashes with the 2024 Six Nations.

Highlights of the season include:

- Derby Weekend – All five fixtures scheduled for Round 6, on the weekend of 17–19 November 2023, are derby matches between local rivals – the Northern Derby (Sale Sharks v Newcastle Falcons), the West Country Derbies (Bath v Bristol Bears and Exeter Chiefs v Gloucester), East Midlands Derby (Leicester Tigers v Northampton Saints), and the London Derby (Harlequins v Saracens).
- Slater Cup – Leicester Tigers and Gloucester will contest the Slater Cup at Kingsholm on 25 November 2023, and at Welford Road on 22 March 2023, in honour of former Leicester and Gloucester player Ed Slater.
- Big Game 15 – Harlequins will host Gloucester in this season's edition of The Big Game at Twickenham Stadium on 30 December 2023.
- The Showdown 4 – Saracens will host Harlequins in this season's edition of The Showdown at Tottenham Hotspur Stadium on 23 March 2024.
- Big Summer Kick-Off 3 – Harlequins will host Northampton Saints in this season's edition of the Big Summer Kick-Off at Twickenham Stadium on 27 April 2024.

All fixtures are subject to change. Referees appointed to officiate Premiership matches are employed by the RFU, unless indicated otherwise.

=== Results ===
Home \ Away	BAT	BRI	EXE	GLO	HAR	LEI	NEW	NOR	SAL	SAR
Bath	—	20–19	41–24	17–10	25–17	24–25	34–26	43–12	42–24	12–15
Bristol Bears	57–44	—	14–24	51–26	21–23	25–14	85–14	52–21	13–27	20–41
Exeter Chiefs	14–26	29–20	—	25–24	58–26	29–10	25–16	36–42	43–0	65–10
Gloucester	27–45	24–33	17–38	—	29–28	20–38	54–14	29–31	32–20	3–24
Harlequins	40–36	28–53	22–14	32–26	—	19–20	40–12	41–32	36–3	10–38
Leicester Tigers	35–22	19–21	40–22	25–27	25–29	—	47–3	26–17	17–24	19–10
Newcastle Falcons	17–28	13–21	14–20	14–18	3–24	13–19	—	14–16	14–35	12–50
Northampton Saints	24–18	27–33	34–19	90–0	36–33	40–17	38–13	—	21–17	41–30
Sale Sharks	11–9	14–22	41–5	24–10	37–31	31–22	40–22	20–15	—	22–20
Saracens	16–25	39–31	40–22	46–24	52–7	32–17	37–19	12–18	10–20	—

Updated to match(es) played on 18 May 2024. Source: Premiership Rugby
Legend: Blue = home team win; Yellow = draw; Red = away team win.

=== Round 1 ===
13 October 2023
19:45

Bristol Bears	25–14	Leicester Tigers
Try: Ibitoye (2) 2' m, 23' c Thacker 21' c Con: MacGinty (2/3) 22', 24'; Pen: Williams (2/3) 38', 43'	Report	Try: Kelly 51' c Liebenberg 72' c Con: C. Atkinson (1/1) 52'; Shillcock (1/1) 73'

Ashton Gate
Attendance: 15,674
Referee: Ian Tempest

14 October 2023
13:30

(1 BP) Exeter Chiefs	65–10	Saracens
Try: Feyi-Waboso 1' m Fisilau 8' c Roots 12' m Hendrickson 16' m Slade 22' c Hodge (3) 25' m, 28' c, 55' c Tuima 59'; Vintcent 72' m Armstrong 74' c Con: Slade (4/9) 9', 23', 30', 56'; Skinner (1/2) 75'	Report	Try: Hartley 45' m Maitland 65' m

Sandy Park
Attendance: 9,371
Referee: Anthony Woodthorpe

14 October 2023
14:00

(1 BP) Bath	34–26	Newcastle Falcons
Try: Barbeary 11' m Spencer (3) 21' m, 39' c, 46' m Redpath 30' c Muir 69' m Con: Spencer (2/5) 31', 40'	Report	Try: Orlando 26' c Stevenson 50' m Blamire 78' m Con: Connon (1/3) 27'; Pen: Connon (3/3) 1', 8', 16'

Recreation Ground
Attendance: 9,680
Referee: Dan Jones

14 October 2023
14:00

(1 BP) Gloucester	29–28	Harlequins (1 BP)
Try: Clark 19' c McGuigan 23' c Ludlow 58' c Ford-Robinson 80+2' m Con: Barton (3/4) 20', 24', 59'; Pen: Barton (1/1) 27'	Report	Try: Dombrandt 1' c W. Evans 25' m Northmore 31' c Con: Edwards (2/3) 2', 32'; Pen: J. Evans (3/4) 62', 65', 72'

Kingsholm
Attendance: 10,458
Referee: Craig Maxwell-Keys

15 October 2023
13:30

Sale Sharks	20–15	Northampton Saints (1 BP)
Try: Roebuck 5' c O'Flaherty 11' m Caine 37' m Con: R. du Preez (1/3) 5'; Pen: R. du Preez (1/1) 35'	Report	Try: Freeman 2' c Ramm 68'; Con: F. Smith (1/2) 3'; Pen: F. Smith (1/2) 26'

Salford Community Stadium
Attendance: 3,842
Referee: Adam Leal

=== Round 2 ===
20 October 2023
18:00

(1 BP) Newcastle Falcons	14–18	Gloucester
Try: Penalty try 67'; Radwan 72' c Con: Connon (1/1) 73'	Report	Try: McGuigan 16' c Morris 21' m Con: Barton (1/2) 18'; Pen: Barton (2/2) 8', 54'

Kingston Park
Attendance: 3,821
Referee: Jack Makepeace

21 October 2023
15:00

(2 BP) Northampton Saints	27–33	Bristol Bears (1 BP)
Try: Seabrook (2) 2' c, 13' c T. Pearson 22' m Freeman 40' m Con: F. Smith (2/4) 3', 14'; Pen: F. Smith (1/1) 73'	Report	Try: Bradbury (2) 10' m, 40+1' c Lahiff 50' c Thacker 59' m Con: Sheedy (2/4) 40+2', 51'; Pen: Sheedy (3/3) 16', 37', 53'

Franklin's Gardens
Attendance: 13,795
Referee: Craig Maxwell-Keys

21 October 2023
15:00

Saracens	16–25	Bath (1 BP)
Try: Christie 1' c Con: Lozowski (1/1) 2'; Pen: Lozowski (3/4) 18', 36', 51'	Report	Try: De Glanville 3' m Reid 7' c McConnochie 21' m Du Toit 55' m Con: Russell (1/4) 8'; Pen: Russell (1/1) 33'

StoneX Stadium
Attendance: 7,061
Referee: Hamish Smales

21 October 2023
15:05

(1 BP) Leicester Tigers	17–24	Sale Sharks
Try: M. Brown 7' m Liebenberg 34' c Hassell-Collins 59' m Con: Shillcock (1/3) 35'	Report	Try: Roebuck 9' c D. du Preez 31' c R. du Preez 69' c Con: R. du Preez (3/3) 10, 32', 70'; Pen: R. du Preez (1/2) 45'

Welford Road
Attendance: 17,719
Referee: Anthony Woodthorpe

22 October 2023
15:00

Harlequins	22–14	Exeter Chiefs
Try: Kenningham 8' c Lynagh 17' c Joseph 34' m Con: J. Evans (2/3) 10', 17'; Pen: Edwards (1/1) 80+1'	Report	Try: Painter 4' c Frost 70' c Con: Slade (2/2) 5', 71'

Twickenham Stoop
Attendance: 11,000
Referee: Andrew Jackson

=== Round 3 ===
27 October 2023
19:45

Gloucester	3–24	Saracens
Pen: Barton (1/1) 5'	Report	Try: Willis (2) 24' c, 49' c Lewington 28' c Con: Lozowski (3/3) 26', 29', 50'; Pen: Lozowski (1/2) 65'

Kingsholm
Attendance: 10,541
Referee: Adam Leal

28 October 2023
14:30

(1 BP) Bristol Bears	21–23	Harlequins
Try: Vakatawa 34' m Thacker 48' c Con: Sheedy (1/2) 49'; Pen: Sheedy (3/3) 24', 28', 62'	Report	Try: Hammond (2) 20' c, 44' c Con: J. Evans (2/2) 21', 45'; Pen: J. Evans (3/3) 7', 15', 78'

Ashton Gate
Attendance: 15,869
Referee: Anthony Woodthorpe

28 October 2023
15:00

(1 BP) Exeter Chiefs	43–0	Sale Sharks
Try: Fisilau 1' c Frost 17' c Iosefa-Scott 36' m Feyi-Waboso 38' c Armstrong 70' c Penalty try 78'; Con: Slade (4/5) 3', 18', 40', 71'; Pen: Slade (1/1) 8'	Report

Sandy Park
Attendance: 8,424
Referee: Joe James

28 October 2023
15:05

(1 BP) Bath	24–25	Leicester Tigers
Try: Muir 14' m Du Toit 54' c Con: Russell (1/2) 55'; Pen: Russell (4/4) 37', 48', 71', 78'	Report	Try: Clare 66' c Con: Shillcock (1/1) 67'; Pen: Shillcock (6/7) 3', 23', 34', 46', 75', 80+1'

Recreation Ground
Attendance: 12,982
Referee: Jack Makepeace

29 October 2023
15:00

(1 BP) Newcastle Falcons	14–16	Northampton Saints
Try: Stephens 75' m Pen: Connon (3/4) 10', 26', 59'	Report	Try: Langdon 54' c Con: F. Smith (1/1) 54'; Pen: F. Smith (3/3) 15', 38', 63'

Kingston Park
Attendance: 5,124
Referee: Hamish Smales

=== Round 4 ===
3 November 2023
19:45

(1 BP) Sale Sharks	24–10	Gloucester
Try: Reed (2) 15' m, 33' c B. Curry 51' m Creevy 69' c Con: Ford (2/4) 35', 70'	Report	Try: Thomas 76' c Con: Barton (1/1) 76'; Pen: Barton (1/2) 12'

Salford Community Stadium
Attendance: 4,479
Referee: Anthony Woodthorpe

4 November 2023
15:00

(1 BP) Harlequins	40–12	Newcastle Falcons
Try: Riley 15' c Lamb 25' c David 36' c Dombrandt 48' c Lynagh 52' m T. Green 74' c Con: J. Evans (4/5) 17', 25', 37', 49'; M. Smith (1/1) 75'	Report	Try: Penalty try 64'; Blamire 78' m

Twickenham Stoop
Attendance: 10,845
Referee: Jack Makepeace

4 November 2023
15:00

Northampton Saints	24–18	Bath (1 BP)
Try: T. Pearson 16' c Coles 32' c Hendy 42' c Con: F. Smith (3/3) 17', 33', 43'; Pen: F. Smith (1/1) 1'	Report	Try: Du Toit 26' c De Glanville 38' m Con: O. Bailey (1/2) 26'; Pen: O. Bailey (1/1) 6'; Spencer (1/1) 69'

Franklin's Gardens
Attendance: 12,704
Referee: Adam Leal

4 November 2023
15:05

(1 BP) Saracens	32–17	Leicester Tigers
Try: Itoje 15' c Christie 26' c B. Vunipola 42' c George 53' m Con: Farrell (3/4) 16', 27', 43'; Pen: Farrell (2/2) 63', 72'	Report	Try: Whiteley 55' c Shillcock 68' c Con: C. Atkinson (1/1) 56' c Shillcock (1/1) 69'; Pen: Shillcock (1/1) 8'

StoneX Stadium
Attendance: 9,251
Referee: Craig Maxwell-Keys

5 November 2023
15:00

(1 BP) Exeter Chiefs	29–20	Bristol Bears
Try: Tuima 2' c Painter 25' c Wyatt 41' c Iosefa-Scott 67' m Con: Slade (3/4) 3', 26', 42'; Pen: Slade (1/1) 75'	Report	Try: Lane (3) 9' m, 18' m, 45' c Con: Sheedy (1/3) 46'; Pen: Sheedy (1/2) 6'

Sandy Park
Attendance: 8,652
Referee: Hamish Smales

=== Round 5 ===
10 November 2023
19:45

Gloucester	27–45	Bath (1 BP)
Try: C. Harris 18' c S. Carreras 27' c Alemanno 68' c Con: Barton (2/2) 20', 69'; S. Carreras (1/1) 28'; Pen: Barton (2/2) 7', 36'	Report	Try: Lawrence (2) 23' c, 80' c Muir 49' c Du Toit 53' c Obano 60' c Penalty try 64'; Con: Russell (5/5) 24', 51', 54', 61', 80+2'; Pen: Russell (1/2) 10'

Kingsholm
Attendance: 16,115
Referee: Matthew Carley

11 November 2023
13:30

Bristol Bears	13–27	Sale Sharks (1 BP)
Try: Caulfield 9' c Con: Sheedy (1/1) 10'; Pen: Sheedy (2/3) 42', 53'	Report	Try: Reed 23' m S. James 45' c R. du Preez 49' m Carpenter 58' c Con: Ford (2/4) 46', 59'; Drop: Ford (1/1) 28'

Ashton Gate
Attendance: 15,100
Referee: Karl Dickson

11 November 2023
15:05

(1 BP) Leicester Tigers	25–29	Harlequins (1 BP)
Try: Liebenberg 19' m Steward (2) 32' c, 46' c Con: Pollard (2/3) 33', 47'; Pen: Pollard (2/2) 7', 65'	Report	Try: Dombrandt 3' m Lamb (2) 15' c, 69' m T. Green 40' m W. Porter 52' c Con: M. Smith (2/5) 17', 53'

Welford Road
Attendance: 20,443
Referee: Ian Tempest

12 November 2023
15:00

Newcastle Falcons	12–50	Saracens (1 BP)
Try: De Chaves 4' c Byrne 51' m Con: Connon (1/2) 5'	Report	Try: Dan (2) 12' c, 39' c Daly 25' c Lewington 33' c Willis 56' m González 71' c Man. Vunipola 80' c Con: Lozowski (4/5) 13', 26', 34', 40'; Goode (2/2) 72', 80+1'; Pen: Lozowski (1/1) 43'

Kingston Park
Attendance: 6,124
Referee: Anthony Woodthorpe

12 November 2023
15:00

(1 BP) Northampton Saints	34–19	Exeter Chiefs
Try: Freeman 2' c Langdon 20' c Mitchell 52' c Dingwall 71' c Con: F. Smith (4/4) 3', 22', 53', 72'; Pen: F. Smith (2/3) 17', 51'	Report	Try: Vermeulen 32' m Sio 63' c Roots 77' c Con: Slade (2/3) 64', 78'

Franklin's Gardens
Attendance: 12,704
Referee: Craig Maxwell-Keys

=== Round 6 ===
17 November 2023
19:45

Bath	20–19	Bristol Bears (1 BP)
Try: Lawrence 15' c Spencer 17' c Con: Russell (2/2) 16', 18'; Pen: Russell (2/3) 10', 69'	Report	Try: Bradbury 5' c Lane 50' c Malins 54' m Con: Sheedy (2/3) 6', 51'

Recreation Ground
Attendance: 14,509
Referee: Christophe Ridley

17 November 2023
19:45

(1 BP) Sale Sharks	40–22	Newcastle Falcons (1 BP)
Try: Reed (2) 10' m, 36' c B. Curry 28' c R. du Preez 31' c S. James 76' c Roebuck 79' c Con: R. du Preez (5/6) 29', 32', 38', 77', 80+1'	Report	Try: L. Brown 2' m Chick 21' m Byrne 50' m Stephens 53' c Con: J. Thomas (1/4) 54'

Salford Community Stadium
Attendance: 5,749
Referee: Adam Leal

18 November 2023
15:05

Leicester Tigers	26–17	Northampton Saints
Try: Van Wyk 56' c Liebenberg 72' c Con: Pollard (2/2) 57', 73'; Pen: Pollard (4/5) 2', 23', 25', 47'	Report	Try: Furbank 59' c S. Matavesi 80+3' c Con: Furbank (2/2) 60', 80+4'; Pen: F. Smith (1/1) 18'

Welford Road
Attendance: 23,075
Referee: Karl Dickson

18 November 2023
17:30

Harlequins	10–38	Saracens (1 BP)
Try: Esterhuizen 73' c Con: M. Smith (1/1) 74'; Pen: M. Smith (1/2) 16'	Report	Try: González 19' c Hartley 29' m George 33' c Christie 42' m Parton 60' c Lewington 69' c Con: Farrell (4/6) 20', 34', 61', 71'

Twickenham Stoop
Attendance: 14,777
Referee: Matthew Carley

19 November 2023
15:00

Exeter Chiefs	25–24	Gloucester (2 BP)
Try: Tuima 9' c Jenkins 33' m Townsend 76' c Con: Slade (2/3) 10', 77'; Pen: Slade (2/2) 61', 80'	Report	Try: Clement 29' c Thorley 56' m Rees-Zammit 66' c S. Atkinson 71' m Con: Barton (2/4) 30', 67'

Sandy Park
Attendance: 9,793
Referee: Ian Tempest

=== Round 7 ===
24 November 2023
19:45

(1 BP) Northampton Saints	36–33	Harlequins (2 BP)
Try: Sleightholme (2) 8' c, 72' m Ludlam 31' c Mitchell 40' c Coles 61' c Con: Furbank (4/5) 9', 32', 40+1', 62'; Pen: Furbank (1/1) 41'	Report	Try: Murley 4' m Walker 27' c Hammond 45' c W. Evans 68' c Jibulu 79' c Con: M. Smith (4/5) 28', 46', 69', 80'

Franklin's Gardens
Attendance: 13,900
Referee: Sara Cox

24 November 2023
19:45

Sale Sharks	11–9	Bath (1 BP)
Try: J. Hill 24' m Pen: Ford (2/2) 48', 73'	Report	Pen: Russell (3/3) 4', 21', 38'

Salford Community Stadium
Attendance: 7,447
Referee: Karl Dickson

25 November 2023
14:30

Gloucester	20–38	Leicester Tigers (1 BP)
Try: McGuigan 49' c Ford-Robinson 66' c Con: Barton (2/2) 50', 67'; Pen: Barton (2/5) 16', 28'	Report	Try: Hassell-Collins (2) 38' m, 60' c Montoya 54' c Kata 80+2' c Con: Pollard (3/4) 55', 61', 80+3'; Pen: Pollard (4/4) 2', 31', 35', 71'

Kingsholm
Attendance: 12,813
Referee: Tom Foley

25 November 2023
15:00

(1 BP) Saracens	39–31	Bristol Bears (1 BP)
Try: Farrell 7' m Lewington (2) 11' m, 44' c B. Vunipola 27' m George (2) 53' c, 77' m Willis 68' m Con: Farrell (2/7) 45', 55'	Report	Try: Batley 19' c Genge 34' c Oghre 39' c Marmion 70' c Con: Sheedy (4/4) 20', 35', 40', 71'; Pen: Sheedy (1/1) 49'

StoneX Stadium
Attendance: 9,100
Referee: Luke Pearce

26 November 2023
15:00

(1 BP) Newcastle Falcons	14–20	Exeter Chiefs
Try: Blamire 5' c Moroni 7' c Con: Johnson (2/2) 6', 9'	Report	Try: Feyi-Waboso 1' m Slade 62' m Iosefa-Scott 68' c Con: Slade (1/3) 69'; Pen: Slade (1/2) 38'

Kingston Park
Attendance: 5,603
Referee: Christophe Ridley

=== Round 8 ===
1 December 2023
19:45

(1 BP) Harlequins	36–3	Sale Sharks
Try: T. Green 8' c Care 42' c Riley 50' m Joseph (2) 58' c, 71' c Con: M. Smith (3/4) 9', 43', 60'; J. Evans (1/1) 72'; Pen: M. Smith (1/1) 21'	Report	Pen: Ford (1/2) 40'

Twickenham Stoop
Attendance: 11,499
Referee: Luc Ramos (France)

2 December 2023
14:00

(1 BP) Bristol Bears	51–26	Gloucester (1 BP)
Try: Malins 10' m Genge 18' c Randall (2) 25' c, 41' m Harding 30' c Batley 48' c Thacker 71' c Con: Sheedy (4/6) 19', 26', 31', 49'; Williams (1/1) 72'; Pen: Sheedy (1/1) 34'; Williams (1/1) 80'	Report	Try: Rees-Zammit (2) 39' c, 53' m Ford-Robinson (2) 57' c, 67' c Con: S. Carreras (3/4) 40+1', 58', 68'

Ashton Gate
Attendance: 16,464
Referee: Jack Makepeace

2 December 2023
15:00

(1 BP) Bath	41–24	Exeter Chiefs
Try: Barbeary (2) 6' m, 66' c Redpath 19' c Spencer 42' m J. Cokanasiga 62' c Butt 69' c Con: Russell (4/6) 20', 63', 67', 71'; Pen: Russell (1/2) 54'	Report	Try: Slade 23' c Townsend 57' c Painter 80' c Con: Slade (3/3) 25', 58', 80+1'; Pen: Slade (1/1) 29'

Recreation Ground
Attendance: 14,509
Referee: Tom Foley

2 December 2023
16:30

(1 BP) Saracens	12–18	Northampton Saints
Try: Parton 59' m Lewington 72' c Con: Man. Vunipola (1/2) 73'	Report	Try: Sleightholme 51' c Mitchell 66' m Con: F. Smith (1/2) 53'; Pen: F. Smith (2/3) 18', 27'

StoneX Stadium
Attendance: 8,700
Referee: Christophe Ridley

3 December 2023
15:00

(1 BP) Leicester Tigers	47–3	Newcastle Falcons
Try: Reffell (3) 14' c, 33' m, 52' c Scott 29' c J. Wiese 40+2' c Hassell-Collins 64' c M. Brown 80' c Con: Pollard (4/5) 15', 30', 40+3', 53'; Shillcock (2/2) 65', 80+1'	Report	Pen: Connon (1/1) 11'

Welford Road
Attendance: 17,248
Referee: Sara Cox

=== Round 9 ===
22 December 2023
19:45

Newcastle Falcons	13–21	Bristol Bears
Try: McDonald 80+2' c Con: Jennings (1/1) 80+3'; Pen: Johnson (1/1) 40+2'; Jennings (1/1) 49'	Report	Try: Thacker 17' c Vakatawa 68' c Oghre 76' c Con: Sheedy (3/3) 17', 69', 76'

Kingston Park
Attendance: 6,104
Referee: Anthony Woodthorpe

22 December 2023
19:45

Sale Sharks	22–20	Saracens (1 BP)
Try: Creevy 17' c Roebuck 43' m Cowan-Dickie 47' c Con: Ford (2/3) 18', 49'; Pen: Ford (1/2) 64'	Report	Try: Van Zyl 40' c Simpson 65' c Con: Farrell (2/2) 40+1', 66'; Pen: Farrell (2/2) 10', 57'

Salford Community Stadium
Attendance: 11,600
Referee: Ian Tempest

23 December 2023
15:00

(1 BP) Exeter Chiefs	29–10	Leicester Tigers
Try: Vermeulen 6' c Penalty try 10'; Slade 38' c Tuima 80' m Con: Slade (2/3) 7', 39'; Pen: Slade (1/1) 50'	Report	Try: Watson 56' m Steward 69' m

Sandy Park
Attendance: 15,000
Referee: Tom Foley

23 December 2023
15:00

(2 BP) Gloucester	29–31	Northampton Saints (1 BP)
Try: Clarke 27' c Harris 40+5' c Alemanno 46' m S. Carreras 52' c Con: Hastings (3/4) 29', 40+6', 53'; Pen: Hastings (1/2) 58'	Report	Try: Mitchell 4' c Coles 7' m Langdon (2) 22' m, 38' c Litchfield 63' c Con: F. Smith (3/5) 5', 39', 65'

Kingsholm
Attendance: 15,184
Referee: Hamish Smales

23 December 2023
15:05

(1 BP) Bath	25–17	Harlequins
Try: J. Cokanasiga (2) 1' m, 47' c Stooke 42' m Reid 73' m Con: Russell (1/4) 49'; Pen: Russell (1/1) 33'	Report	Try: M. Smith 4' m Walker 51' c J. Chisholm 80+1' m Con: M. Smith (1/3) 52'

Recreation Ground
Attendance: 14,509
Referee: Luke Pearce

=== Round 10 ===
29 December 2023
19:45

Bristol Bears	14–24	Exeter Chiefs (1 BP)
Try: Oghre 11' c Heward 36' c Con: Sheedy (2/2) 12', 37'	Report	Try: Iosefa-Scott 6' c Feyi-Waboso 21' m Townsend 40' m Vermeulen 75' c Con: Slade (2/4) 7', 76'

Ashton Gate
Attendance: 24,257
Referee: Christophe Ridley

30 December 2023
15:00

(1 BP) Saracens	37–19	Newcastle Falcons
Try: Dan 10' m Van Zyl 27' c González 40+1' c Penalty try 63'; Mak. Vunipola 70' m Con: Man. Vunipola (2/4) 28', 40+2'; Pen: Man. Vunipola (2/2) 23', 44'	Report	Try: Radwan 16' c Con: Jennings (1/1) 17'; Pen: Jennings (4/5) 1', 20', 36', 46'

StoneX Stadium
Attendance: 9,100
Referee: Jack Makepeace

30 December 2023
15:05

Northampton Saints	21–17	Sale Sharks (1 BP)
Try: Furbank 52' c Mitchell 65' c Penalty try 69'; Con: F. Smith (2/2) 53', 66'	Report	Try: Carpenter 37' c Cowan-Dickie 47' c Con: Ford (2/2) 38', 48'; Drop: Ford (1/1) 58'

Franklin's Gardens
Attendance: 15,153
Referee: Matthew Carley

30 December 2023
17:30

(1 BP) Harlequins	32–26	Gloucester (2 BP)
Try: David (2) 7' m, 19' m Dombrandt 23' m Lamb 43' c Care 54' c Con: M. Smith (2/5) 44', 55'; Drop: M. Smith (1/1) 70'	Report	Try: Hastings 11' c McGuigan 51' c May 71' m Penalty try 77'; Con: Hastings (2/3) 13', 52'

Twickenham Stadium
Attendance: 76,813
Referee: Adam Leal

31 December 2023
15:00

(1 BP) Leicester Tigers	35–22	Bath
Try: Rogerson 13' c M. Brown 23' c Cronin 31' c Martin 34' c Penalty try 43'; Con: Pollard (4/4) 14', 24', 32', 35'	Report	Try: Schreuder 3' c Hennessey 73' c Richards 80' m Con: O. Bailey (1/1) 4'; S. Harris (1/2) 74'; Pen: O. Bailey (1/1) 40'

Welford Road
Attendance: 25,849
Referee: Karl Dickson

=== Round 11 ===
5 January 2024
19:45

Sale Sharks	14–22	Bristol Bears
Try: J. Hill 30' c Creevy 66' c Con: R. du Preez (2/2) 31', 67'	Report	Try: Randall 6' c Ibitoye 17' c Malins 41' m Con: MacGinty (2/3) 7', 18'; Pen: MacGinty (1/1) 73'

Salford Community Stadium
Attendance: 7,346
Referee: Karl Dickson

5 January 2024
19:45

Newcastle Falcons	3–24	Harlequins (1 BP)
Pen: Connon (1/1) 36'	Report	Try: David 1' m Esterhuizen 28' m Walker 46' c Hammond 55' c Con: Edwards (2/4) 47', 56'

Kingston Park
Attendance: 6,403
Referee: Matthew Carley

6 January 2024
15:00

(2 BP) Exeter Chiefs	36–42	Northampton Saints (1 BP)
Try: Vermeulen (2) 5' c, 22' c Feyi-Waboso 12' m Townsend 17' c Tuima 71' c Con: Slade (4/5) 5', 17', 23', 72'; Pen: Slade (1/1) 60'	Report	Try: Braley 29' c Sleightholme (3) 32' c, 57' c, 62' c Furbank 53' c Hutchinson 80' c Con: F. Smith (6/6) 30', 33', 54', 58', 63', 80+1'

Sandy Park
Attendance: 11,100
Referee: Anthony Woodthorpe

6 January 2024
15:05

Leicester Tigers	19–10	Saracens
Try: Kelly 10' m Rogerson 33' c Simmons 60' c Con: Pollard (2/3) 34', 61'	Report	Try: Parton 19' c Con: Farrell (1/1) 20'; Pen: Farrell (1/1) 23'

Welford Road
Attendance: 22,019
Referee: Luke Pearce

7 January 2024
15:00

Bath	17–10	Gloucester (1 BP)
Try: De Glanville (2) 30' m, 61' m Muir 40' c Con: Russell (1/3) 42'	Report	Try: Ackermann 6' c Con: Hastings (1/1) 7'; Pen: Hastings (1/1) 33'

Recreation Ground
Attendance: 13,943
Referee: Christophe Ridley

=== Round 12 ===
26 January 2024
19:45

(1 BP) Harlequins	19–20	Leicester Tigers
Try: David 37' c Walker 58' c T. Green 78' m Con: J. Evans (2/3) 38', 59'	Report	Try: J. Wiese 27' c M. Brown 63' c Con: Pollard (2/2) 28', 64'; Pen: Pollard (2/2) 15', 70'

Twickenham Stoop
Attendance: 14,800
Referee: Tom Foley

27 January 2024
14:00

(1 BP) Northampton Saints	38–13	Newcastle Falcons
Try: Lawes 13' c Penalty try 21'; S. Matavesi 33' m T. James 50' c Sleightholme 62' m Augustus 75' c Con: Savala (3/5) 14', 51', 76'	Report	Try: Radwan 17' c Con: Johnson (1/1) 18'; Pen: Johnson (2/2) 7', 29'

Franklin's Gardens
Attendance: 13,847
Referee: Sara Cox

27 January 2024
15:05

(1 BP) Bristol Bears	57–44	Bath (1 BP)
Try: Capon 6' m Batley 9' c MacGinty 17' c Heward 22' c Williams 31' c Harding 43' c Bradbury 50' c Lane 78' c Con: MacGinty (6/7) 11', 19', 24', 33', 45', 52'; Van Rensburg (1/1) 80'; Pen: MacGinty (1/2) 73'	Report	Try: J. Cokanasiga 2' m Dunn 26' c De Glanville 41' m Coetzee 48' c Du Toit 63' c Penalty try 67'; Con: Russell (3/5) 27', 49', 64'; Pen: Russell (2/2) 15', 77'

Ashton Gate
Attendance: 27,000
Referee: Ian Tempest

27 January 2024
17:30

(1 BP) Saracens	40–22	Exeter Chiefs
Try: Hadfield (2) 5' m, 65' c Van Zyl 13' c González 41' c McFarland 80+1' m Con: Farrell (3/5) 14', 42', 66'; Pen: Farrell (2/2) 29', 58'; Drop: Farrell (1/1) 61'	Report	Try: Woodburn 9' m Fisilau 25' c Tuima 49' c Con: Hodge (2/2) 26', 50'; Pen: Hodge (1/1) 39'

StoneX Stadium
Attendance: 10,100
Referee: Karl Dickson

28 January 2024
15:00

(1 BP) Gloucester	32–20	Sale Sharks
Try: Thorley 5' c McGuigan 19' m Ackermann 22' c C. Atkinson 34' c Con: S. Carreras (3/4) 6', 23', 35'; Pen: S. Carreras (2/2) 58, 80+2'	Report	Try: Warr 14' c Taylor 67' c Con: R. du Preez (2/2) 15', 68'; Pen: R. du Preez (2/2) 30', 56'

Kingsholm
Attendance: 13,500
Referee: Luke Pearce

=== Round 13 ===
22 March 2024
19:45

(1 BP) Bristol Bears	52–21	Northampton Saints
Try: Batley 5' c Randall 19' c Sinckler 50' c Dun 56' c Malins 62' c F. Davies 71' c Ibitoye 79' c Con: MacGinty (6/6) 6', 20', 52', 57', 64', 73'; Williams (1/1) 80'; Pen: MacGinty (1/2) 18'	Report	Try: Sleightholme (2) 35' c, 54' c Garside 66' c Con: F. Smith (3/3) 36', 55', 67'

Ashton Gate
Attendance: 18,014
Referee: Craig Maxwell-Keys

22 March 2024
19:45

(2 BP) Leicester Tigers	25–27	Gloucester
Try: Reffell 39' m Kata 42' m J. Wiese 55' m Shillcock 71' c Con: Shillcock (1/4) 72'; Pen: Shillcock (1/1) 21'	Report	Try: Mercer 28' c C. Harris 35' c Varney 77' c Con: S. Carreras (3/3) 29', 36', 78'; Pen: S. Carreras (2/2) 33', 47'

Welford Road
Attendance: 20,238
Referee: Matthew Carley

23 March 2024
15:00

(1 BP) Exeter Chiefs	25–16	Newcastle Falcons
Try: Fisilau 12' m Wimbush 24' m Sio 32' m Tuima 39' c Con: Hodge (1/1) 40'; Pen: Hodge (1/2) 75'	Report	Try: Stevenson 1' c Con: Connon (1/1) 3'; Pen: Connon (3/4) 15', 36', 52'

Sandy Park
Attendance: 11,490
Referee: Jack Makepeace

23 March 2024
15:05

(1 BP) Saracens	52–7	Harlequins
Try: Lewington 3' c Dan (2) 13' c, 44' c Maitland (2) 17' m, 27' m Cinti 62' c González 68' c Goode 71' c Con: Farrell (6/8) 4', 15', 45', 63', 69', 73'	Report	Try: Dombrandt 51' c Con: M. Smith (1/1) 52'

Tottenham Hotspur Stadium
Attendance: 61,214
Referee: Christophe Ridley

24 March 2024
15:00

(1 BP) Bath	42–24	Sale Sharks
Try: Gallagher 4' c J. Cokanasiga (2) 22' c, 52' c Dunn 70' c Lawrence 75' m Con: Russell (4/5) 5', 24', 53', 71'; Pen: Russell (2/2) 47', 63'; Drop: Russell (1/1) 65'	Report	Try: Tuilagi 18' c Roebuck 42' c Dugdale 57' c Con: Ford (3/3) 19', 44', 58'; Pen: Ford (1/1) 10'

Recreation Ground
Attendance: 14,509
Referee: Adam Leal

=== Round 14 ===
29 March 2024
19:45

(1 BP) Newcastle Falcons	13–19	Leicester Tigers
Try: Redshaw 17' c Con: Connon (1/1) 18'; Pen: Connon (2/3) 2', 64'	Report	Try: Van Poortvliet 4' c Montoya 32' m Hassell-Collins 65' c Con: Pollard (2/3) 5', 66'

Kingston Park
Attendance: 7,112
Referee: Karl Dickson

29 March 2024
19:45

(1 BP) Northampton Saints	41–30	Saracens (1 BP)
Try: Coles 4' c Ramm (2) 10' c, 45' c Freeman 61' c Sleightholme 68' c Con: F. Smith (5/5) 5', 11', 46', 62', 69'; Pen: F. Smith (2/2) 17', 51'	Report	Try: McFarland 18' c Earl 54' c Lewington (2) 79' m, 80' m Con: Farrell (2/2) 19', 55'; Pen: Farrell (2/2) 24', 43'

Franklin's Gardens
Attendance: 15,153
Referee: Luke Pearce

30 March 2024
15:00

Gloucester	24–33	Bristol Bears (1 BP)
Try: Hathaway 10' c S. Carreras 18' c McBurney 21' c Con: S. Carreras (3/3) 12', 19', 23'; Pen: S. Carreras (1/2) 33'	Report	Try: Harding 13' c Oghre 24' c Bradbury (2) 36' m, 66' c Van Rensburg 74' c Con: MacGinty (4/5) 14', 25', 67', 76'

Kingsholm
Attendance: 16,100
Referee: Tom Foley

30 March 2024
15:05

(1 BP) Harlequins	40–36	Bath (2 BP)
Try: Esterhuizen (2) 2' c, 47' c M. Smith 13' c Lynagh 23' c Dombrandt 29' m W. Evans 38' c Con: M. Smith (5/6) 3', 14', 25', 40', 49'	Report	Try: Muir 51' m Barbeary 63' c Schreuder 67' c McConnochie 71' c Stooke 75' c Con: Russell (4/5) 64', 68', 72', 76'; Pen: Russell (1/1) 11'

Twickenham Stoop
Attendance: 14,800
Referee: Anthony Woodthorpe

31 March 2024
15:00

(1 BP) Sale Sharks	41–5	Exeter Chiefs
Try: Roebuck (3) 9' c, 41' c, 58' c Cowan-Dickie 26' c Warr 39' m Quirke 54' m Con: Ford (4/6) 10', 27', 42', 59'; Pen: Ford (1/2) 21'	Report	Try: Feyi-Waboso 48' m

Salford Community Stadium
Attendance: 7,103
Referee: Hamish Smales

=== Round 15 ===
20 April 2024
15:00

(1 BP) Saracens	46–24	Gloucester (1 BP)
Try: Parton (3) 7' c, 12' c, 20' m McFarland 41' m Willis 56' m Hartley 62' c Cinti 65' c Con: Farrell (2/5) 8', 13'; Man. Vunipola (2/2) 62', 67'; Pen: Farrell (1/1) 31'	Report	Try: Hathaway (3) 59' m, 70' m, 72' c Blake 80+1' c Con: C. Atkinson (2/3) 73', 80+2'

StoneX Stadium
Attendance: 9,900
Referee: Anthony Woodthorpe

20 April 2024
15:05

(1 BP) Northampton Saints	40–17	Leicester Tigers
Try: Langdon 42' m Penalty try 46'; R. Smith 63' c Hendy 66' c T. James 72' m Con: Furbank (2/4) 64', 68'; Pen: Furbank (2/2) 13', 32'; Drop: F. Smith (1/1) 78'	Report	Try: Montoya 9' c J. Wiese 55' c Con: Pollard (2/2) 10', 56'; Pen: Pollard (1/1) 15'

Franklin's Gardens
Attendance: 15,153
Referee: Christophe Ridley

20 April 2024
17:30

Exeter Chiefs	14–26	Bath (1 BP)
Try: Woodburn 45' c Townsend 70' c Con: Slade (2/2) 46', 71'	Report	Try: Barbeary 27' c Spencer 39' c Ojomoh 47' m Reid 52' c Con: Spencer (3/4) 28', 40', 53'

Sandy Park
Attendance: 14,993
Referee: Adam Leal

21 April 2024
15:00

(1 BP) Bristol Bears	85–14	Newcastle Falcons
Try: Naulago 1' c Dun 5' c Malins 8' c Bradbury 14' m Williams 26' c Genge 36' c Janse van Rensburg (2) 38' c, 73' c Randall 48' c Marmion 59' c Heenan 69' m Vakatawa (2) 76' c, 78' m Con: MacGinty (6/7) 2', 6', 9', 27', 37', 40'; Williams (3/4) 49', 60', 74'; Janse van Rensburg (1/2) 77'	Report	Try: Radwan 11' c Connon 64' c Con: Connon (2/2) 12', 65'

Ashton Gate
Attendance: 16,648
Referee: Luke Pearce

21 April 2024
15:00

(1 BP) Sale Sharks	37–31	Harlequins (2 BP)
Try: B. Curry 2' c Dugdale 6' m Reed (2) 40+1' c, 63' m Quirke 58' c Con: Ford (3/5) 3', 43', 59'; Pen: Ford (2/2) 15', 43'	Report	Try: Lynagh (2) 23' m, 34' m Murley 48' c Beard 56' c Northmore 78' c Con: M. Smith (2/4) 49', 57'; J. Evans (1/1) 79'

Salford Community Stadium
Attendance: 9,395
Referee: Tom Foley

=== Round 16 ===
26 April 2024
19:45

(1 BP) Bath	12–15	Saracens
Try: Du Toit 56' m Redpath 63' c Con: Spencer (1/2) 65'	Report	Try: Parton 12' m Segun 40+2' c Con: Farrell (1/2) 40+3'; Pen: Farrell (1/1) 78'

Recreation Ground
Attendance: 14,500
Referee: Luke Pearce

27 April 2024
15:00

(1 BP) Leicester Tigers	19–21	Bristol Bears
Try: Hassell-Collins (2) 18' c, 49' m Van Wyk 63' c Con: Pollard (2/3) 19', 64'	Report	Try: Lahiff (2) 69' c, 75' c Bradbury 80' c Con: Williams (1/1) 70'; MacGinty (2/2) 76', 80+1'

Welford Road
Attendance: 25,849
Referee: Matthew Carley

27 April 2024
15:05

(1 BP) Harlequins	41–32	Northampton Saints (1 BP)
Try: Northmore (2) 2' m, 27' c Lewies 34' c Murley 46' c W. Porter (2) 68' m, 74' c Con: M. Smith (3/5) 28', 35', 47'; J. Evans (1/1) 75'; Pen: J. Evans (1/1) 80+1'	Report	Try: Sleightholme 20' c Ramm 49' c Litchfield 63' c Lawes 77' m Con: F. Smith (3/4) 21', 50', 64'; Pen: F. Smith (2/2) 23', 30'

Twickenham Stadium
Attendance: 60,000
Referee: Karl Dickson

28 April 2024
15:00

Gloucester	17–38	Exeter Chiefs (1 BP)
Try: May 29' m Clement 40+1' m Clark 50' c Con: C. Atkinson (1/3) 51'	Report	Try: Vermeulen (2) 14' c, 60' c D. John 18' c Woodburn 36' c Feyi-Waboso 48' c Con: Slade (5/5) 16', 19', 38', 49', 61'; Pen: Slade (1/1) 6'

Kingsholm
Attendance: 11,726
Referee: Christophe Ridley

28 April 2024
15:00

Newcastle Falcons	14–35	Sale Sharks (1 BP)
Try: Pepper 35' c Cardall 53' c Con: Connon (2/2) 36', 54'	Report	Try: B. Curry 27' c Carpenter 30' c Cowan-Dickie 58' c Roebuck 71' c R. du Preez 77' c Con: Ford (5/5) 28', 31', 59', 73', 78'

Kingston Park
Attendance: 8,361
Referee: Anthony Woodthorpe

=== Round 17 ===
10 May 2024
19:45

Newcastle Falcons	17–28	Bath (1 BP)
Try: Blamire (2) 30' m, 40+2' m S. Stuart 63' c Con: Connon (1/3) 64'	Report	Try: Du Toit 4' c Spencer 13' c J. Cokanasiga 26' c Gallagher 38' c Con: Russell (4/4) 5', 14', 28', 39'

Kingston Park
Attendance: 7,024
Referee: Tom Foley

10 May 2024
19:45

(1 BP) Sale Sharks	31–22	Leicester Tigers
Try: Warr 8' c Taylor 13' c S. James 34' c O'Flaherty 43' c Con: Ford (4/4) 10', 14', 35', 45'; Pen: Ford (1/1) 57'	Report	Try: Cole 4' m Scott 17' c Martin 74' c Con: Pollard (1/2) 18'; Shillcock (1/1) 75'; Pen: Shillcock (1/1) 39'

Salford Community Stadium
Attendance: 10,100
Referee: Christophe Ridley

11 May 2024
15:05

Bristol Bears	20–41	Saracens (1 BP)
Try: Batley 4' c Thacker 52' c Con: MacGinty (1/1) 5'; Williams (1/1) 53'; Pen: MacGinty (2/2) 10', 21'	Report	Try: Itoje (2) 23' c, 31' c Segun 61' m González 65' c Con: Farrell (1/1) 24'; Daly (2/3) 32', 67'; Pen: Farrell (1/1) 13'; Daly (4/4) 27', 36', 48', 56'

Ashton Gate
Attendance: 20,942
Referee: Karl Dickson

11 May 2024
15:05

(1 BP) Northampton Saints	90–0	Gloucester
Try: Furbank 1' c Dingwall 11' c Sleightholme (3) 20' c, 56' c, 65' c Langdon (2) 27' m, 34' c Mitchell 38' c A. Waller 46' c S. Matavesi (2) 49' c, 77' m Iyogun 52' c Moon 61' m T. James 69' m Con: F. Smith (8/9) 2', 12', 21', 35', 39', 47', 50', 53'; Furbank (2/5) 57', 66'	Report

Franklin's Gardens
Attendance: 15,249
Referee: Ian Tempest

11 May 2024
17:30

(1 BP) Exeter Chiefs	58–26	Harlequins (1 BP)
Try: Slade 18' c Feyi-Waboso (2) 31' c, 64' c D. John 40+1' c Skinner (2) 41' c, 70' c Jenkins 76' c Con: Slade (7/7) 20', 32', 40+2', 42', 66', 72', 78'; Pen: Slade (3/3) 56', 59', 62'	Report	Try: M. Smith 1' c T. Green 26' c Dombrandt 35' c Lynagh 78' m Con: M. Smith (3/4) 2', 27', 36'

Sandy Park
Attendance: 14,054
Referee: Matthew Carley

=== Round 18 ===
18 May 2024
15:05

(1 BP) Bath	43–12	Northampton Saints
Try: Bayliss 7' c Muir (2) 14' c, 63' m Dunn 42' c Spencer 53' c Barbeary 60' c Con: Russell (4/4) 8', 15', 43', 54'; Spencer (1/1) 61' c Pen: Russell (1/1)	Report	Try: Ramm 39' m Seabrook 77' c Con: Savala (1/1) 78'

Recreation Ground
Attendance: 14,509
Referee: Christophe Ridley

18 May 2024
15:05

(1 BP) Gloucester	54–14	Newcastle Falcons
Try: Mercer 10' c C. Harris 18' c C. Atkinson 20' c Thorley 31' m Blake 41' c May 48' c Hearle 73' c Hathaway 80' c Con: Englefield (5/6) 11', 19', 21', 42', 49'; Varney (1/1) 73'; Socino (1/1) 80+1'	Report	Try: Blamire 23' c Moroni 37' c Con: Connon (2/2) 24', 38'

Kingsholm
Attendance: 11,503
Referee: Sara Cox

18 May 2024
15:05

(1 BP) Harlequins	28–53	Bristol Bears (1 BP)
Try: Cunningham-South (2) 8' c, 51' c Dombrandt 21' c Northmore 46' c Con: M. Smith (4/4) 9', 22', 47', 52'	Report	Try: Williams 1' c Genge 14' c Ibitoye 24' c Thacker 42' m Lahiff 62' c Heward 70' c Oghre 75' c Con: Sheedy (3/3) 2', 15', 25'; Williams (3/4) 64', 72', 77'; Pen: Williams (2/2) 57', 68'

Twickenham Stoop
Attendance: 12,362
Referee: Adam Leal

18 May 2024
15:05

(1 BP) Leicester Tigers	40–22	Exeter Chiefs
Try: Hassell-Collins 20' c Van Poortvliet 26' c Reffell 42' c M. Brown 52' c Con: Pollard (4/4) 22', 27', 43', 54'; Pen: Pollard (2/2) 15', 29'; Wilkinson (2/2) 76', 80+2'	Report	Try: Feyi-Waboso 7' c Frost 57' m Vintcent 67' c Con: Slade (2/3) 9', 68'; Pen: Slade (1/1) 37'

Welford Road
Attendance: 22,258
Referee: Karl Dickson

18 May 2024
15:05

Saracens	10–20	Sale Sharks
Try: Riccioni 65' c Con: Farrell (1/1) 66'; Pen: Farrell (1/1) 25'	Report	Try: Roebuck 22' c R. du Preez 50' c Con: Ford (2/2) 23', 51'; Pen: Ford (2/2) 39', 46'

StoneX Stadium
Attendance: 10,500
Referee: Luke Pearce

== Play-offs ==
As in previous seasons, the top four teams in the Premiership table, following the conclusion of the regular season, will contest the play-off semi-finals in a 1st vs 4th and 2nd vs 3rd format, with the higher ranking team having home advantage. The dates and times for the two play-off semi-finals were announced on 11 May 2024, after the first two teams qualified during round 17 of the regular season. The four qualifying teams were confirmed after the final day of the regular season, on 18 May 2024. The two winners of the semi-finals then meet in the Premiership Final at Twickenham on 8 June 2024.

Semi-finals
31 May 2024 – Franklin's Gardens
Northampton Saints	22
Saracens	20
1 June 2024 – Recreation Ground
Bath	31
Sale Sharks	23

Final
8 June 2024 – Twickenham
Northampton Saints	25
Bath	21

=== Semi-finals ===
31 May 2024
19:45

Northampton Saints (1)	22–20	(4) Saracens
Try: Odendaal 19' c Con: F. Smith (1/1) 20'; Pen: F. Smith (5/6) 28', 31', 40', 62', 70'	Report	Try: Lewington 54' c Cinti 78' c Con: Daly (2/2) 55', 79'; Pen: Daly (2/2) 5', 16'

Franklin's Gardens
Attendance: 15,249
Referee: Christophe Ridley

1 June 2024
15:30

Bath (2)	31–23	(3) Sale Sharks
Try: T. Hill 11' m Obano 22' c Annett 73' c Con: Russell (2/3) 23', 75'; Pen: Russell (4/5) 3', 27', 49', 65'	Report	Try: B. Curry 17' m Taylor 33' c O'Flaherty 51' m Con: Ford (1/3) 34'; Pen: Ford (2/2) 37', 45'

Recreation Ground
Attendance: 14,509
Referee: Luke Pearce

=== Final ===
8 June 2024
15:00

Northampton Saints (1)	25–21	(2) Bath
Try: Freeman 23' c Sleightholme 27' m Mitchell 72' c Con: F. Smith (1/2) 24'; Furbank (1/1) 74'; Pen: F. Smith (1/2) 47'; Drop: F. Smith (1/1) 19'	Report	Try: Du Toit 30' c Muir 50' m Con: Russell (1/2) 32'; Pen: Russell (3/4) 8', 42', 66'

Twickenham Stadium
Attendance: 81,669
Referee: Christophe Ridley

Team details

FB	15	(England) George Furbank
RW	14	(England) Tommy Freeman
OC	13	(South Africa) Burger Odendaal	(substituted off) 44'
IC	12	(England) Fraser Dingwall
LW	11	(England) Ollie Sleightholme
FH	10	(England) Fin Smith	(substituted off) 70'
SH	9	(England) Alex Mitchell
N8	8	(South Africa) Juarno Augustus	(substituted off) 66'
OF	7	(England) Tom Pearson	(substituted off) 60'
BF	6	(England) Courtney Lawes (c)
RL	5	(England) Alex Coles
LL	4	(England) Alexander Moon
TP	3	(England) Trevor Davison	(substituted off) 57'
HK	2	(England) Curtis Langdon	(substituted off) 57'
LP	1	(England) Alex Waller	(substituted off) 52'
Substitutions:
HK	16	(Fiji) Sam Matavesi	(substituted on) 57'
PR	17	(England) Emmanuel Iyogun	(substituted on) 52'
PR	18	(Scotland) Elliot Millar Mills	(substituted on) 57'
LK	19	(Fiji) Temo Mayanavanua	(substituted on) 70'
BR	20	(England) Sam Graham	(substituted on) 66'
BR	21	(England) Lewis Ludlam	(substituted on) 60'
SH	22	(England) Tom James	(substituted on) 70'
FB	23	(England) George Hendy	(substituted on) 44'
Coach:
(England) Phil Dowson

FB	15	(Italy) Matt Gallagher
RW	14	(England) Joe Cokanasiga		(substituted off) 77'
OC	13	(England) Ollie Lawrence
IC	12	(Scotland) Cameron Redpath		(substituted off) 78'
LW	11	(England) Will Muir
FH	10	(Scotland) Finn Russell
SH	9	(England) Ben Spencer (c)
N8	8	(England) Alfie Barbeary		(substituted off) 21'
OF	7	(England) Sam Underhill		(substituted off) 64' (substituted on) 74'
BF	6	(England) Ted Hill		(substituted off) 66'
RL	5	(England) Charlie Ewels
LL	4	(Ireland) Quinn Roux		(substituted off) 66'
TP	3	(South Africa) Thomas du Toit
HK	2	(England) Tom Dunn		(substituted off) 52'
LP	1	(England) Beno Obano	(red card) 21'
Substitutions:
HK	16	(Ireland) Niall Annett		(substituted on) 52'
PR	17	(South Africa) Juan Schoeman		(substituted on) 21' (substituted off) 52'
PR	18	(England) Will Stuart		(substituted on) 52'
LK	19	(England) Elliott Stooke		(substituted on) 66'
BR	20	(Scotland) Josh Bayliss		(substituted on) 66'
SH	21	(South Africa) Louis Schreuder
FH	22	(England) Orlando Bailey		(substituted on) 78'
BR	23	(England) Miles Reid		(substituted on) 64' (substituted off) 74' (substituted on) 77'
Coach:
(South Africa) Johann van Graan

Player of the Match:
(England) George Hendy (Northampton Saints)
Assistant referees:
Luke Pearce
Anthony Woodthorpe
Television Match Official:
Tom Foley

== Promotion/relegation play-off ==
Subject to meeting the eligible criteria for promotion, the team which places 1st in the 2023–24 RFU Championship will contest a play-off against the team which finishes bottom of the Premiership table, with the winner competing in the following year's Premiership season. If the Championship winner is ineligible for promotion, no play-off will take place.

On 29 June 2023, it was announced that the promotion/relegation play-off would take place across two legs, with each team playing one of the matches at their home ground, during the weekends of 31 May – 2 June and 7–9 June 2024.

On 20 March 2024, it was confirmed that only Doncaster Knights would be eligible for promotion, should they top the Championship table. They were therefore also the only Championship team that would be able to compete in the play-off, if appropriate. Despite winning the 2023–24 Championship, Ealing Trailfinders did not meet the RFU's minimum standards criteria, so no promotion/relegation play-off took place this season.

== Leading scorers ==
Note: Flags to the left of player names indicate national team as has been defined under World Rugby eligibility rules, or primary nationality for players who have not yet earned international senior caps. Players may hold one or more non-WR nationalities.

=== Most points ===
As of 18 May 2024

Rank	Player	Club	Points
1	(England) Henry Slade	Exeter Chiefs	152
2	(England) Fin Smith	Northampton Saints	132
3	(Scotland) Finn Russell	Bath	128
4	(South Africa) Handré Pollard	Leicester Tigers	105
5	(England) Owen Farrell	Saracens	103
6	(England) George Ford	Sale Sharks	97
7	(England) Marcus Smith	Harlequins	88
8	(Wales) Callum Sheedy	Bristol Bears	79
9	(United States) AJ MacGinty	Bristol Bears	78
10	(England) Ollie Sleightholme	Northampton Saints	70

=== Most tries ===
As of 18 May 2024

Rank	Player	Club	Tries
1	(England) Ollie Sleightholme	Northampton Saints	14
2	(England) Immanuel Feyi-Waboso	Exeter Chiefs	10
2	(England) Tom Roebuck	Sale Sharks	10
4	(England) Alex Lewington	Saracens	9
5	(Scotland) Magnus Bradbury	Bristol Bears	8
5	(England) Alex Dombrandt	Harlequins	8
5	(England) Ollie Hassell-Collins	Leicester Tigers	8
5	(England) Ben Spencer	Bath	8
9	Multiple players tied		7

== Attendances ==
Club	Home Games	Total	Average	Highest	Lowest	% Capacity
Bath	10	133,660	13,366	14,509	9,680	92%
Bristol Bears	9	169,968	18,885	27,000	15,100	70%
Exeter Chiefs	9	102,877	11,431	15,000	8,424	73%
Gloucester	9	117,940	13,104	16,115	10,458	81%
Harlequins	9	226,894	25,210	76,813	10,845	86%
Leicester Tigers	9	194,698	21,633	25,849	17,248	84%
Newcastle Falcons	9	55,676	6,186	8,361	3,821	61%
Northampton Saints	10	142,907	14,291	15,249	12,704	94%
Sale Sharks	9	67,061	7,451	11,600	3,842	62%
Saracens	9	134,926	14,992	61,214	7,061	89%

== Discipline ==
=== Citings/bans ===
Player	Match (Note: The cited player's club is listed in bold italics.)	Citing date	Law breached	Result	Ref
(England) Jonny May	**Gloucester** vs. Bath	10 November 2023	9.11 – Reckless or Dangerous Play (Citing)	3-match ban (Note: The ban is reduced by one match, subject to the player's completion of the World Rugby Coaching Intervention Programme.)	
(Ireland) Niall Armstrong	Northampton vs. **Exeter**	12 November 2023	9.11 – Reckless or Dangerous Play (Red card)	3-match ban	
(England) Mako Vunipola	**Saracens** vs. Newcastle	30 December 2023	9.13 – Dangerous Tackling (Red card)	4-match ban	
(Tonga) Solomone Kata	Northampton vs. **Leicester**	20 April 2024	9.13 – Dangerous Tackling (Red card)	3-match ban	
(England) Maro Itoje	Bath vs. **Saracens**	26 April 2024	9.13 – Dangerous Tackling (Citing)	Citing dismissed	
(England) Mike Brown	**Leicester** vs. Bristol	27 April 2024	9.27 – 2 Yellow Cards (Red card)	Sending off sufficient	
(England) Mike Brown	**Leicester** vs. Bristol	27 April 2024	Conduct Prejudicial to the Interests of the Game or Union (Rule 5.12)	5-match ban (Note: The sanction is implemented as an immediate two-match ban, with the remaining three matches conditionally suspended until the end of the 2024–25 season.)	
(South Africa) Jasper Wiese	**Leicester** vs. Exeter	18 May 2024	9.18 – Tip Tackle (Red card)	6-match ban	
(England) Beno Obano	Northampton vs. **Bath**	8 June 2024	9.13 – Dangerous Tackling (Red card)	4-match ban	

== Awards ==
=== Player of the Month ===
The following players have received the Gallagher Premiership Player of the Month award during the 2023–24 season, as selected by a panel of media commentators, in addition to monthly public polls.

Month	Nominees	Club	Winner	Refs
October	(England) Greg Fisilau	Exeter	(England) Ben Spencer	
October	(England) Zach Mercer	Gloucester	(England) Ben Spencer	
October	(England) Henry Slade	Exeter	(England) Ben Spencer	
October	(England) Ben Spencer	Bath	(England) Ben Spencer	
November	(Scotland) Andy Christie	Saracens	(England) Ollie Lawrence	
November	(South Africa) Tyrone Green	Harlequins	(England) Ollie Lawrence	
November	(England) Ollie Lawrence	Bath	(England) Ollie Lawrence	
November	(England) Arron Reed	Sale	(England) Ollie Lawrence	
December	(England) Alfie Barbeary	Bath	(England) Courtney Lawes	
December	(England) Courtney Lawes	Northampton	(England) Courtney Lawes	
December	(Scotland) Finn Russell	Bath	(England) Courtney Lawes	
December	(England) Henry Slade (2)	Exeter	(England) Courtney Lawes	
January	(England) Immanuel Feyi-Waboso	Exeter	(England) Fin Smith	
January	(England) Guy Pepper	Newcastle	(England) Fin Smith	
January	(England) Ollie Sleightholme	Northampton	(England) Fin Smith	
January	(England) Fin Smith	Northampton	(England) Fin Smith	
March	(South Africa) Benhard Janse van Rensburg	Bristol	(England) Ollie Sleightholme	
March	(England) Harry Randall	Bristol	(England) Ollie Sleightholme	
March	(England) Tom Roebuck	Sale	(England) Ollie Sleightholme	
March	(England) Ollie Sleightholme (2)	Northampton	(England) Ollie Sleightholme	
April	(England) Owen Farrell	Saracens	(South Africa) Benhard Janse van Rensburg	
April	(South Africa) Tyrone Green (2)	Harlequins	(South Africa) Benhard Janse van Rensburg	
April	(South Africa) Benhard Janse van Rensburg (2)	Bristol	(South Africa) Benhard Janse van Rensburg	
April	(England) Tom Parton	Saracens	(South Africa) Benhard Janse van Rensburg	

Note: No Player of the Month was awarded for February, as the Premiership was paused due to the 2024 Six Nations.

=== End-of-season awards ===
The nominees for the 2024 Premiership Rugby Awards were announced on 20 May 2024. The winners were revealed on 22 May 2024.

Player of the Season
Nominee	Club	Winner	Ref
(England) Courtney Lawes	Northampton	(England); Henry; Slade	
(Scotland) Finn Russell	Bath	(England); Henry; Slade	
(England) Henry Slade	Exeter	(England); Henry; Slade	
(England) Fin Smith	Northampton	(England); Henry; Slade	

Breakthrough Player of the Season
Nominee	Club	Winner	Ref
(England) Fin Baxter	Harlequins	(England); Immanuel; Feyi-Waboso	
(England) Chandler Cunningham-South	Harlequins	(England); Immanuel; Feyi-Waboso	
(England) Immanuel Feyi-Waboso	Exeter	(England); Immanuel; Feyi-Waboso	
(England) Guy Pepper	Newcastle	(England); Immanuel; Feyi-Waboso	

Director of Rugby of the Season
Nominee	Club	Winner	Ref
(England) Phil Dowson	Northampton	(England); Phil; Dowson	
(Ireland) Mark McCall	Saracens	(England); Phil; Dowson	
(England) Alex Sanderson	Sale	(England); Phil; Dowson	
(South Africa) Johann van Graan	Bath	(England); Phil; Dowson	

Community Player of the Season
Nominee	Club	Winner	Ref
(England) Mark Atkinson	Gloucester	(Scotland); Andy; Christie	
(Scotland) Andy Christie	Saracens	(Scotland); Andy; Christie	
(England) Tom James	Northampton	(Scotland); Andy; Christie	
(England) Ethan Waller	Northampton	(Scotland); Andy; Christie	

Try of the Season
Nominee	Club	Match	Venue	Round	Winner	Ref
(South Africa) Tyrone Green	Harlequins	vs. Newcastle	Twickenham Stoop	4	(South Africa); Tyrone; Green	
(England) Tom James	Northampton	vs. Gloucester	Franklin's Gardens	17	(South Africa); Tyrone; Green	
(South Africa) Benhard Janse van Rensburg	Bristol	vs. Newcastle	Ashton Gate	15	(South Africa); Tyrone; Green	
(Italy) Louis Lynagh	Harlequins	vs. Exeter	Sandy Park	17	(South Africa); Tyrone; Green	

Team of the Season (Forwards)
No.	Nominee	Position	Club
1.	(England) Fin Baxter	Prop	Harlequins
2.	(England) Curtis Langdon	Hooker	Northampton
3.	(South Africa) Thomas du Toit	Prop	Bath
4.	(England) Rus Tuima	Lock	Exeter
5.	(England) Alex Coles	Lock	Northampton
6.	(England) Courtney Lawes	Flanker	Northampton
7.	(England) Ben Earl	Flanker	Saracens
8.	(South Africa) Jasper Wiese	Number 8	Leicester

Team of the Season (Backs)
No.	Nominee	Position	Club
9.	(England) Ben Spencer	Scrum-Half	Bath
10.	(England) Fin Smith	Fly-Half	Northampton
11.	(England) Ollie Sleightholme	Wing	Northampton
12.	(South Africa) Benhard Janse van Rensburg	Centre	Bristol
13.	(England) Henry Slade	Centre	Exeter
14.	(England) Immanuel Feyi-Waboso	Wing	Exeter
15.	(South Africa) Tyrone Green	Full-Back	Harlequins

== See also ==
- 2023–24 European Rugby Champions Cup
- 2023–24 EPCR Challenge Cup
- 2023–24 Premiership Rugby Cup
- 2023–24 RFU Championship
- 2023–24 United Rugby Championship
- 2023–24 Top 14 season
- 2023–24 Rugby Pro D2 season
- 2024 Major League Rugby season
- 2024 Super Rugby Pacific season
