= Ben Spencer (rugby union) =

England international rugby union player

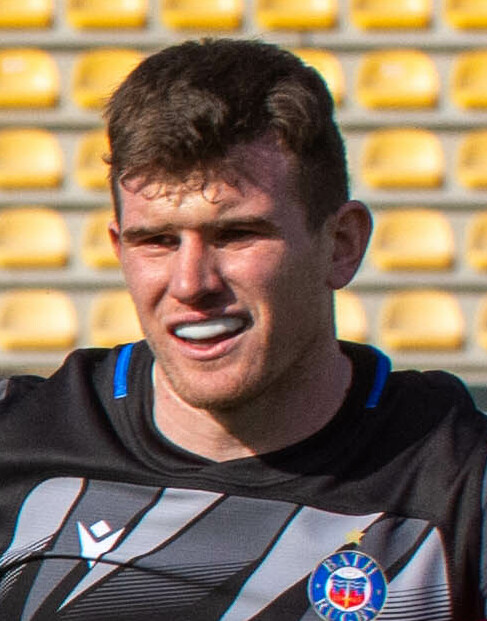
- Spencer in 2021
- Full name: Benjamin Thomas Spencer
- Born: 31 July 1992 (age 34) Stockport, England
- Height: 1.78 m (5 ft 10 in)
- Weight: 86 kg (190 lb; 13 st 8 lb)
- School: Bramhall High School; Ivybridge Community College

Rugby union career
- Position: Scrum-half
- Current team: Bath
Senior career
Years	Team	Apps	(Points)
2010–2011	Cambridge	29	(150)
2011–2020	Saracens	172	(542)
2020–	Bath	142	(415)
- Correct as of 10 November 2026
International career
Years	Team	Apps	(Points)
2012	England U20	6	(0)
2012	England A	2	(5)
2018–	England	22	(5)
- Correct as of 10 November 2026

Benjamin Thomas Spencer (born 31 July 1992) is an English professional rugby union player who plays as a scrum-half for Premiership Rugby club Bath and the England national team.

== Club career ==
=== Saracens ===
Spencer began his youth rugby at Manchester Rugby Club and went on to represent Cambridge during the 2010–11 National League 1 season. In August 2011, after impressing during a pre-season trial, Spencer signed for Saracens. In March 2015, Spencer kicked a last-minute penalty as Saracens defeated Exeter Chiefs 23–20 in the final of the Anglo-Welsh Cup.

Spencer was a second-half substitute for Richard Wigglesworth as Saracens defeated Racing 92 in the 2016 European Rugby Champions Cup final to become champions of Europe for the first time in their history. The following season, Spencer was again a replacement as Saracens defeated Clermont in the 2017 European Rugby Champions Cup final at Murrayfield to retain their European title.

Spencer was Saracens' top try scorer during the 2017–18 season and scored a penalty as Saracens beat Exeter 27–10 in the 2018 Premiership final.

Spencer started in the 2019 European Rugby Champions Cup final as Saracens defeated Leinster at St James' Park to become European champions for the third time in four years. He then scored a try in the 2018–19 Premiership Rugby final as Saracens retained their league title.

=== Bath ===
Spencer joined Bath in a three-year deal ahead of recommencement of the 2019–20 season. In September 2022 he was made club captain.

In May 2024, following an impressive season in which Spencer led Bath to their first Premiership final in almost a decade, which they lost against Northampton Saints, he was named in the Premiership Team of the Season for the 2023–24 campaign.

Spencer scored a try in the 2024–25 EPCR Challenge Cup final as Bath defeated Lyon at the Millennium Stadium to win their first European trophy for seventeen years. The following month he started in the 2025 Premiership final which saw them beat Leicester Tigers to become champions of England for the first time since 1996.

== International career ==
Spencer was a member of the England under-20 squad that finished seventh at the 2012 IRB Junior World Championship in South Africa. In January 2012, Spencer scored a try on his debut for the England A side in a victory against Ireland Wolfhounds.

Spencer was included in the senior England squad for their 2018 tour of South Africa. On 9 June 2018 he made his senior England international debut, arriving from the bench as a replacement for Ben Youngs during the first test defeat against South Africa at Ellis Park Stadium. Spencer was an unused substitute in the last test of the tour as England lost the series 2–1.

Spencer was initially not selected for the 2019 Rugby World Cup however he was called up after Willi Heinz was ruled out of the tournament due to suffering an injury during the semi-final against New Zealand. Spencer made his only appearance of the competition coming on as a substitute for Ben Youngs in the final which England lost against South Africa to finish runners up.

In October 2024, having previously always played off the bench for England, Spencer was named as a starter for the first time for the 2024 Autumn Nations Series fixture against New Zealand. Subsequently, in January 2025, following injuries to Alex Mitchell and Jack van Poortvliet, Spencer was recalled into the senior training squad ahead of the 2025 Six Nations although ultimately did not play in that tournament.

Spencer was included in the squad for the 2025 tour of Argentina. He started in the opening test win against Argentina which was his first victory at international level on his ninth cap. Spencer also played in their next match which England won to complete a series victory.

In November 2026, he scored his first try off an intercepted pass from Filipo Daugunu during a 45–22 victory against Australia in the 2026 Nations Championship.

=== List of international tries ===
as of 10 November 2026

No.	Date	Venue	Opponent	Score	Result	Competition
1	8 November 2026	Twickenham Stadium, London, England	Australia	38–22	45–22	2026 Nations Championship

== Honours ==
Saracens

- 4x Premiership Rugby winner: 2014–15, 2015–16, 2017–18, 2018–19
- 3x European Rugby Champions Cup winner: 2015–16, 2016–17, 2018–19
- 1x Anglo-Welsh Cup winner: 2014–15

Bath

- 1x Premiership Rugby winner: 2024–25
- 1x EPCR Challenge Cup winner: 2024–25
- 1x Premiership Rugby Cup winner: 2024–25
- 1x Premiership Rugby runner-up: 2023–24

England

- 1x Rugby World Cup runner-up: 2019
