= Ehren =

Other names
- Related names: Aaron, Erin

Ehren is a given name. Notable people with the name include:

- Ehren Earleywine, American sports coach and administrator
- Ehren Kruger (born 1972), American film producer and screenwriter
- Ehren McGhehey (born 1976), American stunt performer and actor
- Ehren Painter (born 1998), English rugby union player
- Ehren Wassermann (born 1980), American baseball player and coach
- Ehren Watada (born 1978), American army officer
- Kyle Ehren Snyder (born 1977), American baseball player and coach
