= Tyrone Green =

South African rugby union player (born 1998)

- Born: 5 March 1998 (age 28) Klerksdorp, South Africa
- Height: 1.79 m (5 ft 10 1/2 in)
- Weight: 89 kg (196 lb; 14 st 0 lb)
- School: Jeppe High School for Boys

Rugby union career
- Position: Utility back
- Current team: Harlequins
Youth career
- 2011: Leopards
- 2014–2019: Golden Lions
Senior career
Years	Team	Apps	(Points)
2018–2020	Golden Lions	10	(25)
2019–2020	Lions	15	(10)
2020–	Harlequins	101	(165)
- Correct as of 26 October 2025
International career
Years	Team	Apps	(Points)
2016	South Africa Under-18	3	(9)
2018	South Africa Under-20	5	(15)
- Correct as of 25 August 2018

Tyrone Green (born 5 March 1998) is a South African rugby union player for Harlequins in the Premiership. He is a utility back that can play as a fullback, wing, fly-half or centre.

== Career ==
Green made his Currie Cup debut on 24 August 2018, coming on as a second half substitute in the Golden Lions clash with the Griquas in which they won 62-41.

He made his Lions Super Rugby debut in round 5 of the 2019 Super Rugby season, starting at fullback against the Rebels in the Lions 36-33 comeback victory on 16 March 2019.

=== Harlequins ===
He joined Premiership Rugby side Harlequins ahead of the 2020–21 season. On his full debut he scored a brace of tries after starting on the wing against the Newcastle Falcons.

He was named man of the match during Harlequins 43–36 defeat of Bristol Bears in the Premiership semi-final, a game in which Green scored two tries as Quins recovered from 28 points down to win. He started the following week in the Premiership final against Exeter. Harlequins won the game 40-38 in the highest scoring Premiership final ever.

In Round 4 of the 2023–24 Premiership season, Green scored against Newcastle Falcons from a cross-field kick by Marcus Smith. This try went on to be awarded try of the season for the entire league. In April 2024, he was part of the side that beat Glasgow Warriors 28–24 in the Round of 16 of the European Champions Cup, the first time the club had ever won a knockout game in the competition. The following week he was named man of the match during Harlequins 42–41 victory again Bordeaux Bègles in the quarter finals after scoring the winning try making it the second win in the knockout stages of the competition in the club's history. In May 2024, following an impressive season he was named in the Premiership Rugby Team of the Season for the 2023–24 campaign.

In September 2025, he scored his first try of the season in the opening round against Bath. In October 2025, he scored his second try of the season in the following home game, a 20–14 victory against Saracens. Later that month, he scored two tries on his 100th appearance for the club during a 52–14 victory against Newcastle Red Bulls.
