= Olly Hartley =

English rugby union player

- Born: Oliver Hartley; 19 February 2002 (age 24)
- Height: 1.93 m (6 ft 4 in)
- Weight: 104 kg (16 st 5 lb)
- School: Whitgift School

Rugby union career
- Position: Centre
- Current team: Saracens
Amateur team(s)
| Years | Team | Apps | (Points) |
- Hammersmith & Fulham
Senior career
| Years | Team | Apps | (Points) |
| 2021–22 | Wasps | 4 | (15) |
| 2021–22 | →Ampthill | 11 | (10) |
| 2022– | Saracens | 57 | (75) |
| 2023– | →Ampthill | 4 | (10) |
- Correct as of 11 June 2026
International career
| Years | Team | Apps | (Points) |
| 2024– | England A | 1 | (0) |
- Correct as of 6 December 2024

Oliver Hartley (born 19 February 2002) is an English professional rugby union player who plays as a centre for Premiership Rugby club Saracens.

== Early life ==
Hartley began playing rugby union at the age of five, following in the footsteps of his father Gary – a former trialist with the England national team – when he joined Hammersmith & Fulham RFC. He continued his rugby education whilst a student at Whitgift School in Croydon, prior to joining the Wasps academy as a teenager.

== Club career ==
Hartley made his first-team debut for Wasps in 2021, at the age of 19, playing against Newcastle Falcons in the pool stages of the 2021–22 Premiership Rugby Cup. He then spent the majority of the year on loan with Ampthill in the RFU Championship, making four appearances and scoring two tries for his parent club that year. On 17 February 2022, two days before his 20th birthday, it was announced that Hartley had signed a long-term deal with Wasps, graduating into the senior squad for the 2022–23 Premiership season.

On 17 October 2022, Wasps were placed into administration due to financial insolvency and immediately ceased trading, with all players and staff at the club made redundant. This meant that Hartley never featured in a Premiership match for the club. One month later, he signed an academy contract with Saracens in November 2022, and his first appearance for them soon followed, during a pool stage fixture against Leicester Tigers in the 2022–23 Premiership Rugby Cup.

Hartley made his Premiership debut for Saracens on 25 February 2023, starting at inside centre in a home game against Newcastle Falcons. He earned plaudits for his performance and was voted as player of the match.

Ahead of the 2023–24 season, Hartley was promoted into the Saracens senior squad, while also dual-registered with Championship club Ampthill. He subsequently made his European Rugby Champions Cup debut in December 2023, as a substitute against the Bulls, then earned his first start in the competition a week later, scoring two tries in a win over Connacht. In total, Hartley made 20 first-team appearances for Saracens across all competitions, before suffering a serious season-ending knee injury at the end of a Premiership match against Gloucester in April 2024. Despite sustaining a ruptured anterior cruciate ligament, a torn meniscus, a ruptured medial collateral ligament and a torn posterior cruciate ligament, he returned to action for Saracens just seven months later, during the 2024–25 Premiership Rugby Cup.

== International career ==
In February 2024, Hartley received his first call-up for international rugby, when he was included in the England A squad to face Portugal. He featured as a second-half replacement, helping England A to achieve a 91–5 victory.
