= Rus Tuima =

English rugby union player

Rusiate Tuima
- Born: 21 May 2000 (age 26) Suva, Fiji
- Height: 1.95 m (6 ft 5 in)
- Weight: 128 kg (20.2 st; 282 lb)
- School: St Boniface's Catholic College; Ivybridge Community College; Exeter College
- Notable relative(s): Lagi Tuima (sister); Joe Cokanasiga (cousin); Akapusi Qera (uncle)

Rugby union career
- Position(s): Lock, Back-row
Senior career
Years	Team	Apps	(Points)
2019–2026	Exeter Chiefs	36	(60)
2020–2021	→ Plymouth Albiom (loan)		
2022–2023	→ Cornish Pirates (loan)	10	(10)
2026–	Newcastle Red Bulls	0	(0)
- Correct as of 17 January 2024
International career
Years	Team	Apps	(Points)
2018	England U18	5	(5)
2019–2020	England U20	14	(10)
2024–	England A	1	(5)
- Correct as of 25 February 2024

Rusiate Tuima is an English professional rugby union player who plays as a Lock or Back-row for Premiership Rugby club Newcastle Red Bulls.

== Early life ==
Born in Suva, Fiji, Tuima moved to England from Fiji as a child at the age of four.

== Club career ==
Tuima made his Exeter Chiefs debut in the Premiership Rugby Cup against Bath Rugby at Sandy Park in 2019. He made his full Premiership Rugby debut coming off the bench against Wasps RFC at the Ricoh Arena in January 2021. In March 2024, he signed a new contract with the club until 2026. In May 2024, following an impressive season he was named in the Premiership Rugby Team of the Season for the 2023–24 campaign.

On 5 January 2026, Tuima agrees a move to Premiership rivals Newcastle Red Bulls on a two-year contract from the 2026-27 season.

== International career ==
Although born in Fiji, Tuima has represented England at youth level. In 2018 he competed for the England Under-18 side. Tuima scored a try for the England U20 team in a defeat to Wales during the 2019 Six Nations Under 20s Championship. Later that year he was a member of the squad that finished fifth at the 2019 World Rugby Under 20 Championship.

In February 2024 Tuima scored a try for England A in a victory over Portugal. In May 2024, he was called up by Steve Borthwick to a senior England team training squad.

In May 2024 Tuima was called up to the senior England squad for a training camp.

== Personal life ==
The nephew of Fiji national rugby union team player Akapusi Qera, Tuima's older sister, Lagi Tuima, has represented England women's national rugby union team internationally and plays for Harlequins Women in the Premier 15s. Their brother Jeremy is also in the academy at Exeter. Their cousins include Bath Rugby and England international Joe Cokanasiga and his younger brother, Phil Cokanasiga, who played for London Irish.
