= Niall Armstrong =

Irish rugby union player (born 1999)

- Born: 19 August 1999 (age 27)
- Height: 1.83 m (6 ft 0 in)
- Weight: 86 kg (190 lb; 13 st 8 lb)
- School: Royal Belfast Academical Institution
- University: University of Exeter

Rugby union career
- Position: Scrum half
- Current team: Exeter Chiefs
Senior career
Years	Team	Apps	(Points)
2023-2025	Exeter Chiefs	20	(0)
2025–	Dragons	7	(0)

Niall Armstrong (born 19 August 1999) is an Irish rugby union player who plays at scrum half for Exeter Chiefs.

== Early life ==
From Ulster, he attended Royal Belfast Academical Institution with whom he won two Schools Cups. He also attended University of Exeter where he captained the first-XV rugby union team.

== Career ==
He made his debut for Exeter Chiefs in September 2023. During his first season for Exeter, he was mainly used as a replacement at the start of the season but scored two tries for the club in the opening weeks of the season. In November 2023, he was given a red card in the Rugby Premiership for a high boot striking Northampton Saints fly half Fin Smith in the face which was deemed as reckless. It was an action that his Exeter head coach Rob Baxter described as "not deliberate" and Smith described as just "one of those things". In April 2024 after making eleven appearances for the Chiefs he agreed a contract extension.

At the start of the 2025/26 season, Armstrong left Exeter Chiefs and joined welsh United Rugby Championship region Dragons.
