= Tom Elliot =

British Lions & Scotland international rugby union footballer (1926–1998)

Tom Elliot MBE
- Born: Thomas Elliot; 6 April 1926 Galashiels, Scotland
- Died: 3 May 1998 (aged 72) Scottish Borders, Scotland
- School: Loretto School
- Notable relative: Fin Smith (grandson)

Rugby union career
- Position: Prop
Amateur team(s)
Years	Team	Apps	(Points)
- Gala
Provincial / State sides
Years	Team	Apps	(Points)
- South of Scotland
International career
Years	Team	Apps	(Points)
1955-1958	Scotland	14	(0)
1955	British and Irish Lions	0	(0)
–	Barbarians		

Thomas Elliot MBE (6 April 1926 – 3 May 1998) was a Scotland international rugby union player. His regular playing position was Prop.

== Rugby Union career ==
=== Amateur career ===
Elliot was born into a farming family in the Scottish Borders. He was educated at St. Mary's School, Melrose and at Loretto School, Musselburgh. After school he joined Gala RFC and played for the 2XV at lock. He soon moved to loose-head prop and over the next fifteen years made the position his own. Early in his career he gained a reputation for rumbustious play. Bill McLaren described him as "a tough rugged son of the soil".

=== Provincial career ===
Elliot was capped by South of Scotland District.

=== International career ===
Elliot made his debut for Scotland in the 1955 Five Nations Championship. Scotland beat Wales 14–8 at Murrayfield. His next match against Ireland resulted in another victory at the same venue. Elliot also played in a narrow 9–6 defeat to England at Twickenham.

In the 1956 Five Nations Championship he played all four matches. Scotland won one match against France at Murrayfield. The following year Scotland won two matches in the 1957 Five Nations Championship; Elliot played in every match. He played two matches in the 1958 Five Nations Championship, losing to Wales and Ireland. In between he played in a 12–8 victory over Australia at Murrayfield on their 1957–58 Australia rugby union tour of Britain, Ireland and France.

Elliot was selected for the 1955 British Lions tour to South Africa, alongside his compatriot and fellow prop Hugh McLeod. They were kept from the Test team by the all Wales trio of Billy Williams, Bryn and Courtney Meredith. As it was Elliot played eight of the midweek games. He also played for the Barbarian F.C.

== Farming career ==
Elliot had farming interests in the Borders and Sutherland. He was a former president of the Selkirk branch of the National Farmers Union of Scotland, and former president of the Borders area. His animals often won championships at the Royal Highland Show near Edinburgh, of which he became a director. Elliot was also a past president of the Cheviot Sheep Society, member of the government's Hill Farming Advisory Committee and a director of the Moredun Foundation. For his contributions to farming he was awarded an MBE in 1989.
