= James Ramm =

Australian rugby union player

- Born: 30 April 1998 (age 28) Hunters Hill, New South Wales, Australia
- Height: 193 cm (6 ft 4 in)
- Weight: 100 kg (220 lb; 15 st 10 lb)
- School: St Joseph's College, Hunters Hill
- University: University of New South Wales

Rugby union career
- Position(s): Wing, Fullback
- Current team: Force
Senior career
Years	Team	Apps	(Points)
2019–2022	Sydney	5	(0)
2019–2022	Waratahs	20	(15)
2022–2026	Northampton Saints	75	(160)
2026	Northland	5	(25)
2027–	Force	0	(0)
- Correct as of 3 January 2026
International career
Years	Team	Apps	(Points)
2018	Australia U20	1	(0)

James Ramm (born 30 April 1998) is an Australian rugby union player who currently plays for the Force in the Super Rugby. Ramm's primary position is wing, and often deploys as a fullback.

== Early life ==
Brought up in Hunters Hill, Australia, Ramm was a talented gymnast throughout his childhood and had aspirations to become an Olympian. He competed in all six apparatus, but a lack of specialisation in any one led him to pursue a different path.

Ramm was educated at St Joseph's College, Hunters Hill. He played in the College's 2nd XV in his final year, 2015.

== Club career ==
=== Waratahs ===
He was signed to the Waratahs squad for the 2020 season.

=== Northampton Saints ===
He signed for Northampton Saints ahead of the 2022/23 season. Ramm made his debut in the Premiership Rugby Cup, scoring two tries in a 26-28 defeat to London Irish. His first Premiership try came in away defeat at Gloucester in December 2022. He went on to win back-to-back Saints player of the month awards, picking up the award in both December 2022 and January 2023. After a stellar debut season where he scored eight tries in nineteen appearances, Ramm was awarded Northampton's Breakthrough Player of the Season award and the Player's Player of the Season.

Ramm began the 2023–24 campaign in excellent form, scoring three tries in his first four games. However, he sustained an MCL injury against Harlequins in November and didn't return until March. He signed a new contract with Northampton Saints in February 2024. In his second season with the club, in spite of his injury-hit campaign, Ramm made 15 appearances and scored 10 tries.

=== Western Force ===
On 24 February 2026, Ramm would return home to Australia to join Western Force on a two-year contract from the 2027 Super Rugby Pacific season.

== Honours ==
Northampton

- Premiership Rugby: 2023–24, 2025–26
- European Rugby Champions Cup runner-up: 2024–25
