= George Furbank =

English rugby union player (born 1996)

- Full name: George Arthur Furbank
- Born: 17 October 1996 (age 30) Huntingdon, England
- Height: 1.82 m (6 ft 0 in)
- Weight: 92 kg (203 lb; 14 st 7 lb)
- School: Kimbolton School; Bedford School

Rugby union career
- Position(s): Full-back, Fly-half
- Current team: Harlequin FC
Senior career
Years	Team	Apps	(Points)
2015–2026	Northampton Saints	147	(308)
2026–	Harlequins	4	(0)
- Correct as of 26 October 2026
International career
Years	Team	Apps	(Points)
2020–	England	14	(15)
- Correct as of 25 November 2024

George Arthur Furbank (born 17 October 1996) is an English professional rugby union player who plays as a full-back for Prem Rugby club Harlequins and England.

== Early life ==
Born in Huntingdon, Furbank played his first rugby at Huntingdon RFC, where his family had been involved since the 1950s. From the age of four until sixteen he was educated at Kimbolton School, where rugby was not played. Furbank played other sports, including cricket where he was a talented batsman and was on the books at Leicestershire until under-16 level. He joined Bedford School for sixth form, captaining their rugby 1st XV before linking up with Saints' Senior Academy in 2015.

== Club career ==
=== Northampton Saints ===
In 2016 Furbank played for Saints in the Singha Premiership Rugby Sevens Series campaign, and in 2017 he signed an extended contract with the Midlands side.

In November 2017 Furbank made his club debut and scored his first try for Northampton in an Anglo-Welsh Cup game against Exeter Chiefs. The following season he started in the 2018–19 Premiership Rugby Cup final as Northampton beat Saracens to lift the trophy.

Furbank scored two tries in a 2023–24 European Rugby Champions Cup pool stage game against RC Toulon and later in that campaign started in their semi-final elimination against Leinster. At the end of that season he started in the 2023–24 Premiership Rugby final as Northampton defeated Bath to become League champions.

Ahead of the 2024–25 season, Furbank was named as club captain, having captained the club 12 times in the previous season due to injuries to Lewis Ludlam.

In April 2025, upon his return from a fractured arm, Furbank scored a try and made two assists in a 51‍–‍16 win against Castres in the 2024–25 Champions Cup quarter final.

=== Harlequins ===
On 8 April 2026, it was announced he would be leaving Northampton at the end of the 2025–26 season after 11 years at the club. On the same day it was confirmed that would join rival Premiership side Harlequins.

== International career ==
Furbank received his first call up by coach Eddie Jones to the senior England squad for the 2020 Six Nations Championship. On 2 February 2020 he made his Test debut starting in the opening round defeat against France. He retained his starting place for the last round as England beat Italy to win the tournament.

On 24 February 2024 Furbank started against Scotland during the 2024 Six Nations Championship and scored his first international try. He also started their next fixture against Ireland which saw him score another try.

=== International tries ===
As of 24 November 2024

Try	Opposing team	Venue	Competition	Date	Result
1	Scotland	Murrayfield Stadium, Edinburgh	2024 Six Nations	24 February 2024	21 -30
2	Ireland	Twickenham Stadium, London	2024 Six Nations	9 March 2024	23 - 22
3	Japan	Twickenham Stadium, London	2024 Autumn Internationals	24 November 2024	59 -14

== Honours ==
England

- 1× Six Nations Championship: 2020

Northampton

- 1× Premiership Rugby: 2023–24 2025–26
- 1× Premiership Rugby Cup: 2018–19
