= Ollie Sleightholme =

English rugby union player

- Born: Oliver Harry Sleightholme; 13 April 2000 (age 26) Northampton, England
- Height: 1.81 m (5 ft 11 1/2 in)
- Weight: 89 kg (196 lb; 14 st 0 lb)
- School: Northampton School for Boys
- Notable relative: Jon Sleightholme (father)

Rugby union career
- Position: Wing
- Current team: Northampton Saints
Senior career
Years	Team	Apps	(Points)
2018–	Northampton Saints	106	(315)
- Correct as of 15 October 2026
International career
Years	Team	Apps	(Points)
2018	England U18	4	(15)
2019–2020	England U20	10	(25)
2024–	England	8	(30)
- Correct as of 14 March 2025

Oliver Harry Sleightholme (born 13 April 2000) is an English professional rugby union footballer who plays as a wing for Northampton Saints. His father, Jon Sleightholme, was an England international.

== Youth career ==
Sleightholme spent all his youth career at Northampton Old Scouts, where he played alongside future Saints teammate Connor Tupai. He was a pupil at Northampton School for Boys, and played in the school's team that made it to the semi-final of the 2018 NatWest Schools Cup, in which he scored a try in a 19–12 defeat by Queen Elizabeth Grammar School, Wakefield. Sleightholme played for the England rugby sevens team at the 2017 Commonwealth Youth Games in the Bahamas, and he scored a try in his team's loss to Samoa in the final. He scored a try on his debut for England under-18s in a 42–14 win against Wales under-18s on 25 March 2018.

== Club career ==
Sleightholme signed a senior academy contract with Northampton Saints before the 2018–19 season. He made his debut for Northampton in a Premiership Rugby Cup match against Bristol Bears on 27 October 2018. And he made his Premiership debut three weeks later, scoring his first Northampton try 14 seconds after coming on as a second-half replacement against Wasps. In only his second EPCR Challenge Cup game, he scored four tries against Timișoara Saracens on 18 January 2019.

Sleightholme scored a try in the 2023–24 Premiership Rugby final as Northampton defeated Bath to become League champions. At the end of that season in May 2024, having finished as top tryscorer in the Premiership, he was named in the Premiership Rugby Team of the Season for the 2023–24 campaign.

In October 2026, he scored a hat-trick of tries in a 71–48 victory against Bath, the second highest scoring Prem fixture ever at the time.

== International career ==
Sleightholme was named in the England squad for the 2019 Six Nations Under 20s Championship, and he made his debut at that level in the opening game against Ireland. He scored tries against both France and Italy to help England finish third in the competition.

Sleightholme also played at the 2019 World Rugby Under 20 Championship and scored two tries as England lost to Ireland in their opening game. He subsequently scored a try in England's final pool game against Australia, with England eventually finishing the tournament in fifth place. Coach Alan Dickens named Sleightholme in his England squad for the 2020 Six Nations Under 20s Championship and he made one appearance during the tournament against Scotland.

In September 2021 Sleightholme was called up to the senior England side for a training camp. He was included in the squad for their 2024 tour of New Zealand and on 6 July 2024 made his debut as a substitute in the opening Test defeat to the All Blacks at Forsyth Barr Stadium.

In November 2024 Sleightholme scored his first tries at senior international level with a double in a loss against Australia during the 2024 Autumn Nations Series. He also scored in their next game during a defeat against South Africa. Sleightholme went on to score his fourth try in five games in their last Autumn international fixture of 2024, a 59–14 win against Japan. This equalled the amount his father, Jon, had scored for England.

In February 2025, he was called up to the senior training squad replacing Cadan Murley for the 2025 Six Nations. He was subsequently named in the starting lineup to make his tournament debut in the second round against France.

=== List of international tries ===
as of 9 March 2025.

No.	Date	Venue	Opponent	Score	Result	Competition	Ref.
1	9 November 2024	Twickenham Stadium, London, England	Australia	23–28	37–42	2024 end-of-year rugby union internationals	
2	9 November 2024	Twickenham Stadium, London, England	Australia	28–28	37–42	2024 end-of-year rugby union internationals	
3	16 November 2024	Twickenham Stadium, London, England	South Africa	5–0	20–29	2024 end-of-year rugby union internationals	
4	24 November 2024	Twickenham Stadium, London, England	Japan	33–7	59–14	2024 end-of-year rugby union internationals	
5	9 March 2025	Twickenham Stadium, London, England	Italy	19–14	47–24	2025 Six Nations Championship	
6	9 March 2025	Twickenham Stadium, London, England	Italy	40–17	47–24	2025 Six Nations Championship	

== Honours ==
Northampton

- Premiership Rugby: 2023–24, 2025–26
- Premiership Rugby Cup: 2018–19
- European Rugby Champions Cup runner-up: 2024–25
