= Jon Sleightholme =

England international rugby union player

Jonathan Mark Sleightholme (born 5 August 1972 (age 53) in Malton, North Yorkshire) is a former rugby union player who played on the wing for Grimsby, Hull Ionians Wakefield, Bath, Northampton Saints, Yorkshire, England Sevens and England.

== Career ==
Originally from Yorkshire, he attended the University of Chester and played for Wakefield RFC. He then joined Bath Rugby for the 1994–95 season. Rugby Union was amateur at the time and he worked as a teacher combining with playing. He won a league and cup double with Bath and was called up by England for the 1996 Five Nations Championship. He made his England debut in the opening game of that Five Nations in Paris away against France. England would go on to win that Championship and he scored his first England try in the final match as they sealed the title against Ireland at Twickenham. He kept his place in the England team for the 1997 Five Nations Championship in which he scored two tries against Ireland in Dublin. He joined Northampton Saints in 1997. For Northampton he scored ten tries in fifty appearances. In total, he played twelve times for England scoring four tries and also has played for the Barbarians.

== Post-rugby career ==
In 2009, he was Managing Director Rugby for Sport2Business. In 2011 he began working as a rugby coach at Cokethorpe School, Witney.

== Personal life ==
Born in Malton, North Yorkshire, he married Julie in the summer of 1997. His son, Ollie Sleightholme, is a professional rugby union player for Northampton Saints and an England international.
