= Phil Cokanasiga =

England rugby union player

- Born: Phil Cokanasiga; 31 July 2001 (age 25) Barnet, London
- Height: 1.83 m (6 ft 0 in)
- Weight: 98 kg (216 lb; 15 st 6 lb)
- School: St Paul's College

Rugby union career
- Position: Centre
- Current team: Gloucester Rugby
Senior career
Years	Team	Apps	(Points)
2019–2022	London Irish	15	(25)
2021–2022	→ Rosslyn Park (loan)	5	(10)
2022	→ Esher (loan)		
2022–2024	Leicester Tigers	19	(15)
2024–2026	Ospreys	18	(20)
2026–	Gloucester	1	(10)
- Correct as of 11 May 2024
International career
Years	Team	Apps	(Points)
2018–2019	England U18s	8	(5)
2021	England U20s	3	(0)
- Correct as of 1 July 2021

Phil Cokanasiga (born 31 July 2001) is an English professional rugby union player who plays as a centre for PREM Rugby club Gloucester. He previously played for London Irish, Leicester Tigers and Ospreys (rugby union)

== Career ==
In 2018 Cokanasiga played for England under 18. He was a member of the England under-20 squad that completed a junior grand slam during the 2021 Six Nations Under 20s Championship.

Cokanasiga made his debut for London Irish in the 2019–20 season. He played for Rosslyn Park and Esher on loan during the 2021–22 season.

On 12 May 2022 it was announced Cokanasiga had signed for Leicester Tigers. He made his Leicester debut on 10 September 2022 as a replacement in a 24–20 defeat away to Exeter Chiefs. In his last season with the club he scored two tries as they defeated Ealing Trailfinders in the semi-final of the 2023–24 Premiership Rugby Cup. He came off the bench as a substitute in the final which saw Leicester lose against Gloucester to finish runners up.

Cokanasiga joined Ospreys for the 2024–25 United Rugby Championship.

On 10 March 2026, Phil would return to the English Premiership as he signs for Gloucester from the 2026–27 season.

== Personal life ==
His brother is Bath and England player Joe Cokanasiga. His cousins include rugby players Rus Tuima and Lagi Tuima, who has represented the England women's team and plays for Harlequins Women in the Premier 15s.
