= Lagi Tuima =

- Born: 16 June 1998 (age 28) Fiji
- Notable relative(s): Akapusi Qera (uncle); Joe Cokanasiga (cousin); Phil Cokanasiga (cousin); Rus Tuima (brother)

Rugby union career
- Position: Centre / Full-back
- Current team: Harlequins Women
Amateur team(s)
Years	Team	Apps	(Points)
2014–2016	Devonport Services		
2016–2017	Plymouth Albion		
Senior career
Years	Team	Apps	(Points)
2017–2019	Bristol Bears		
2019–	Harlequins		(80)
International career
Years	Team	Apps	(Points)
2016–2018	England U20s		
2017–	England	16	(28)

Lagilagi Tuima (born 16 June 1998) is an English rugby union player. She represents England women's national rugby union team internationally and plays for Harlequins Women in the Premier 15s.

== International career ==
Tuima made her debut as a replacement against Canada. Lagi's first experience of the Women's Six Nations came in 2018 as a replacement against Wales. She scored her first international try against Scotland later in the tournament.

She was named as one of England's 28 contracted players for the 2019/20 season.

== Club career ==
She began playing rugby at the age of 16, joining Devonport Services. After playing for Plymouth Albion Ladies Tuima was signed by Bristol Bears Women for the 2017-18 Premier 15s. She moved to Harlequins Women in 2019.

== Early life and education ==
The niece of Fiji national rugby union team player Akapusi Qera, Tuima moved to England as a child. Before playing rugby, she was focused on football and academics.

Tuima's younger brother, Rus, has been picked in England age group rugby teams and is on the books at Exeter Chiefs.

Her cousins include Bath Rugby and England international Joe Cokanasiga and his younger brother, Phil Cokanasiga, who is at London Irish.
