= Joe Cokanasiga =

England international rugby union player

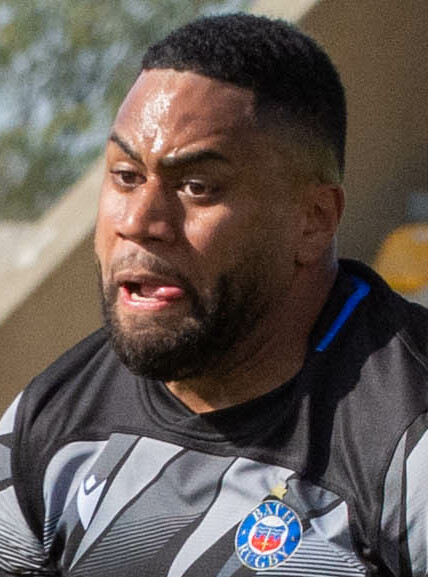
- Cokanasiga during Challenge Cup 2020-21 of Zebre vs Bath
- Born: Ratu Josateki Tuivanuavou Waqanivalu Cokanasiga; 15 November 1997 (age 28) Suva, Fiji
- Height: 1.93 m (6 ft 4 in)
- Weight: 112 kg (247 lb; 17 st 9 lb)
- School: Bushey Academy
- Notable relative(s): Phil Cokanasiga (brother); Rus Tuima (cousin); Lagi Tuima (cousin)

Rugby union career
- Position: Wing
Amateur team(s)
Years	Team	Apps	(Points)
- Merchant Taylors
Senior career
Years	Team	Apps	(Points)
2017–2018	London Irish	35	(65)
2018–	Bath	128	(245)
- Correct as of 1 May 2026
International career
Years	Team	Apps	(Points)
2017	England U20	4	(10)
2018–2023	England	16	(65)
- Correct as of 1 November 2024

Joe Cokanasiga (/ˈðɒkænəˌsɪŋə/; born 15 November 1997) is a professional rugby union player for the England national rugby union team. He plays wing for Bath, having previously represented London Irish. He helped his former team win promotion from the RFU Championship in 2016–17 season to the English Premiership for the 2017–18 season.

== Early life ==
Cokanasiga was born in Fiji but before his third birthday, moved to England with his father, Ilaitia, who was in the British Army. He has lived in Germany and Brunei as his father toured those countries and learned to play rugby. They formed a father-son centre partnership for the Army Brunei Garrison team before returning to the UK in 2013.

Joe's first adult rugby match - on his 17th birthday - was for Old Merchant Taylors' FC on 15 November 2014, vs HAC. OMTs were then playing in London 2NW (Level 7). Joe became the top try-scorer for the club, despite only playing a part of the season. Joe continued to play for OMT and Team Honeybadger 7s throughout 2015, before moving to London Irish.

== Professional career ==
He joined the London Irish academy in 2015 and played for their sevens team in the Premiership Rugby Sevens Series and in October 2016, he signed a two-year deal to stay with the club. He made his debut in the 2016–17 RFU Championship on 30 October 2016 against London Scottish and scored a brilliant individual try beating multiple defenders, demonstrating his raw power and pace.

In May 2018, it was announced that Cokanasiga had signed for Bath on a three-year deal. A two-year extension to this was announced in March 2021. As of May 2026 he has remained with Bath Rugby.

== International career ==
In 2016, Cokanasiga played for the England U18 side that toured South Africa. In the 2017 Six Nations Under 20 Championship, he played in England U20 side against France, scoring a try.

Cokanasiga was called up to the senior England squad by Eddie Jones for their 2017 summer tour of Argentina. When questioned on why he had plucked the player from relative obscurity, Eddie Jones was typically blunt: "He's big and he's fast." He did not actually play due to picking up an injury in London Irish's end-of-season playoff battles for promotion from the Championship back to the Premiership.

In November 2018, Cokanasiga was selected to make his international test debut against Japan. Eddie Jones, citing his reasons for the selection, simply stated "He’s got power and he’s got pace, there’s something a little bit special about him". Cokanasiga scored on his international debut in a hard-fought win over Japan. He retained his place for the next match in the Quilter Autumn Internationals, against Australia, and put in a powerful performance capped by a try in the second half.

On 12 August 2019, Cokanasiga was named as part of Jones' 31-man squad for the 2019 Rugby World Cup. He would only make one appearance in the tournament, starting in England's pool game against the United States. He scored two tries in a 45-7 win but did not make the match day squad for the rest of England's campaign

Cokanasiga returned from the World Cup with a serious knee injury. He was out for almost a year following surgery, meaning that he was unavailable for the 2020 Six Nations.

His next England selection came on 10 June 2021, when Jones named him as part of his squad for the 2021 Summer Internationals against the USA and Canada. Cokanasiga started against the United States on 4 July 2021, scoring two tries. He then went on to score two more tries the week after in England's 70-14 victory over Canada.

Cokanasiga again injured his knee in a preseason game for Bath against Cardiff Rugby, meaning that he missed out on selection for the 2021 Autumn Nations Series. He has now scored 12 tries in 12 Test matches.

=== International tries ===
As of 6 November 2022

Try	Opposing team	Location	Venue	Competition	Date	Result	Score
1	Japan	London, England	Twickenham Stadium	2018 end-of-year rugby union internationals	17 November 2018	Win	35 – 15
2	Australia	London, England	Twickenham Stadium	2018 end-of-year rugby union internationals	24 November 2018	Win	37 – 18
3	Wales	London, England	Twickenham Stadium	2019 Rugby World Cup warm-up match	11 August 2019	Win	33 – 19
4	Ireland	London, England	Twickenham Stadium	2019 Rugby World Cup warm-up match	24 August 2019	Win	57 – 15
5	Ireland	London, England	Twickenham Stadium	2019 Rugby World Cup warm-up match	24 August 2019	Win	57 – 15
6	United States	Kobe, Japan	Kobe Misaki Stadium	2019 Rugby World Cup	26 September 2019	Win	45 – 7
7	United States	Kobe, Japan	Kobe Misaki Stadium	2019 Rugby World Cup	26 September 2019	Win	45 – 7
8	United States	London, England	Twickenham Stadium	2021 July rugby union tests	4 July 2021	Win	43 – 29
9	United States	London, England	Twickenham Stadium	2021 July rugby union tests	4 July 2021	Win	43 – 29
10	Canada	London, England	Twickenham Stadium	2021 July rugby union tests	10 July 2021	Win	70 – 14
11	Canada	London, England	Twickenham Stadium	2021 July rugby union tests	10 July 2021	Win	70 – 14
12	Argentina	London, England	Twickenham Stadium	2022 end-of-year rugby union internationals	6 November 2022	Loss	29 – 30

== Honours ==
- Rugby World Cup / Webb Ellis Cup
  - Runner up: 2019
