= Fin Smith =

English rugby union player

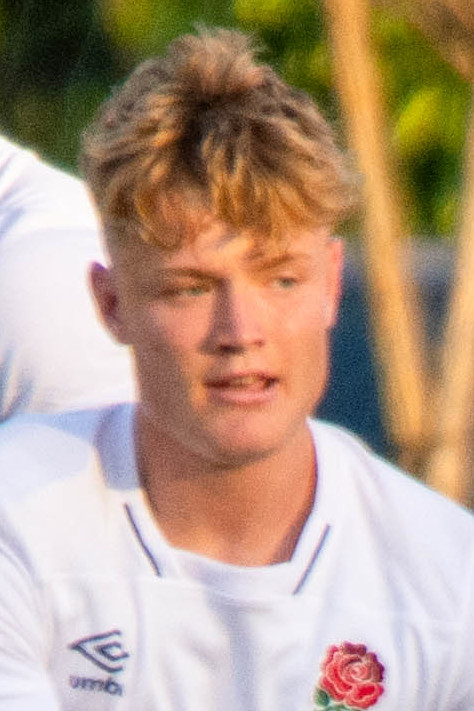
- Smith representing the England Under 20 team in 2022
- Full name: Finlay Smith
- Born: 11 May 2002 (age 24) Warwick, England
- Height: 1.84 m (6 ft 0 in)
- Weight: 89 kg (196 lb; 14 st 0 lb)
- School: Warwick School
- Notable relative: Tom Elliot (grandfather)

Rugby union career
- Position: Fly-half
- Current team: Northampton Saints
Senior career
Years	Team	Apps	(Points)
2020–2022	Worcester Warriors	31	(120)
2022–	Northampton Saints	86	(821)
- Correct as of 13 November 2026
International career
Years	Team	Apps	(Points)
2020–2022	England U20	8	(52)
2024–	England	21	(40)
2025	British & Irish Lions	0	(0)
- Correct as of 10 November 2026

Finlay Smith (born 11 May 2002) is an English professional rugby union player who plays as a fly-half for Premiership Rugby club Northampton Saints and the England national team.

== Club career ==
Smith started playing rugby at local club Shipston-on-Stour and Warwick School prior to joining the Worcester Warriors academy. At 18 years and 292 days, Smith became the second 18-year-old to play for Warriors in the top flight when he made his debut as a replacement against Gloucester Rugby at Kingsholm on 27 February 2021.

During 2021, Smith spent a period of time on loan at Ampthill in the RFU Championship.

Smith started for the Warriors side that beat London Irish in the final of the 2022 Premiership Rugby Cup to win Worcester their first ever top-flight trophy.

On 5 October 2022, all Worcester Warriors players' contracts were terminated due to liquidation of the company to which they were contracted. Smith joined Northampton Saints with immediate effect shortly after.

In May 2024, following an impressive season he was named in the Premiership Rugby Team of the Season for the 2023–24 campaign. He also won the RPA Players' Player of the Year 2023-24, as voted for by his fellow players across the league.

In January 2025, he scored the winning penalty after the clock had gone red to beat league leaders Bath 35–34 in the Premiership and win man of the match.

== International career ==
=== England ===
Smith was selected for the England under-20 team to compete in the 2021 Six Nations Under 20s Championship and contributed significantly, starting in four out of five games and scoring a try against Scotland. England won the tournament and achieved a grand slam. In July 2022 Smith represented the England U20 team during a summer series of games in Italy.

Smith's father is Scottish and he is the grandson of former Scotland and Lions prop Tom Elliot making him also eligible to represent Scotland.

In January 2024 he was called up by Steve Borthwick to the senior England squad for the 2024 Six Nations Championship and made his debut coming off the bench in a win against Italy. In October 2024, he was among the 17 original players to awarded an RFU Enhanced Elite Player Squad (EPS).

In February 2025, he was given his first test start in the second round of the 2025 Six Nations against France. He was awarded man of the match, kicking the winning conversion as England won 26–25. In the third round, Smith scored the winning penalty from 50m in a 16–15 victory over Scotland to win the Calcutta Cup.

=== British & Irish Lions ===
In May 2025, he was selected for the 2025 British & Irish Lions tour to Australia and in taking the field against Argentina on 20 June 2025, became the first player to be selected for the Lions who is the grandson of a former Lion.

== Honours ==
Worcester Warriors

- Premiership Rugby Cup: 2021-2022

Northampton

- Premiership Rugby: 2023–24, 2025–26
- European Rugby Champions Cup runner-up: 2024–25
