= Joe Batley =

English rugby union player

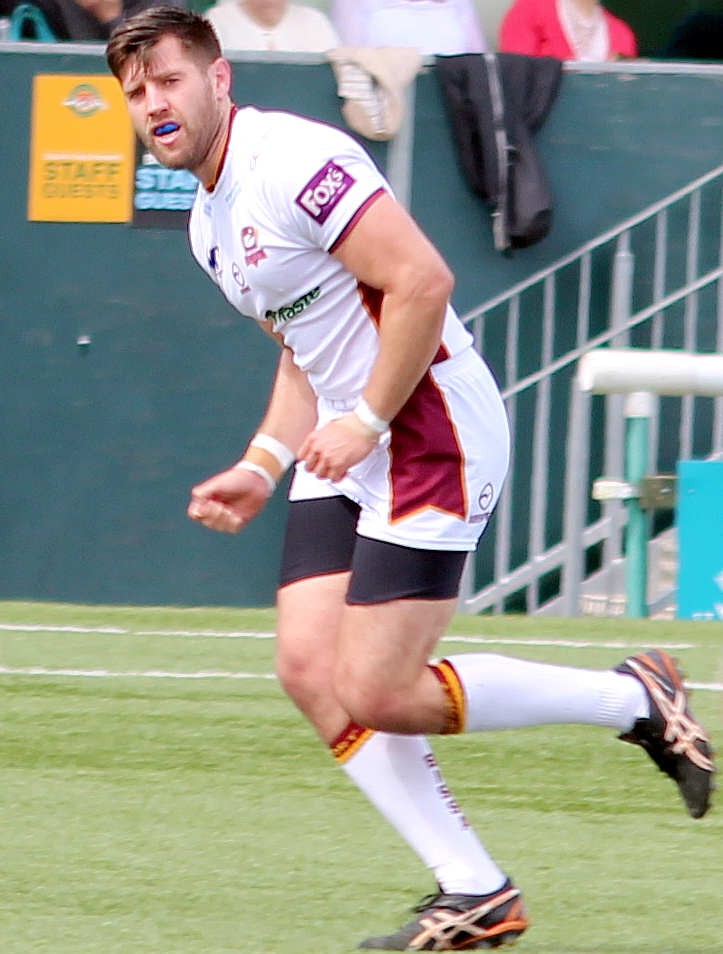
- Bately in 2017
- Born: Joseph Batley; 27 June 1996 (age 30) Portsmouth, England
- Height: 2.00 m (6 ft 7 in)
- Weight: 124 kg (19 st 7 lb)
- School: Hartpury College

Rugby union career
- Position(s): Second row, Back row
Senior career
Years	Team	Apps	(Points)
2014–2017	Gloucester	6	(0)
2016	→ Rotherham Titans (loan)	3	(0)
2017–2020	Bristol Bears	20	(20)
2019	→ Hartpury University (loan)	11	(10)
2019–2020	→ Leicester Tigers (loan)	5	(0)
2020–2022	Worcester Warriors	41	(30)
2022–	Bristol Bears	74	(60)
- Correct as of 20 December 2025
International career
Years	Team	Apps	(Points)
2014	England U18	10	(5)
2015	England U20	5	(0)
2025–	England A	1	(5)
- Correct as of 8 November 2025

Joe Batley (born 27 June 1996) is an English professional rugby union player who plays at lock, Flanker or Number 8 for Premiership Rugby club Bristol Bears.

== Career ==
Batley played for the England U18 side that won the 2014 Rugby Europe Under-18 Championship. The following year he was a member of the England U20 team that won the 2015 Six Nations Under 20s Championship. Batley was initially included in the squad for the 2015 World Rugby Under 20 Championship however illness ruled him out of attending the tournament.

Batley was a graduate of the Gloucester academy and in 2017 left to sign his first professional contract with local rivals Bristol. In his first season at the club Bristol won the 2017–18 RFU Championship to secure promotion to the top flight.

Batley joined Worcester Warriors for the 2020–21 season. In May 2022 he started for the Warriors side that beat London Irish in the final of the Premiership Rugby Cup to win Worcester their first ever top-flight trophy.

On 5 October 2022 all Worcester players had their contacts terminated due to the liquidation of the company to which they were contracted. Following the termination of his contract at Worcester it was confirmed that Batley had returned to Bristol Bears.

In November 2024, Batley was selected for the England A squad however an injury sustained playing for Bristol against Australia A ruled him out of their side. In May 2025 he was called up to a training camp for the senior England squad by coach Steve Borthwick. Later that year in November 2025, Batley scored a try for England A during a defeat against an All Blacks XV.

== Honours ==
Worcester Warriors

- 1× Premiership Rugby Cup: 2021–22

Bristol

- 1× RFU Championship: 2017–18

England U20

- 1× Six Nations Under 20s Championship: 2015
