= Harry Randall (rugby union) =

England international rugby union scrum half

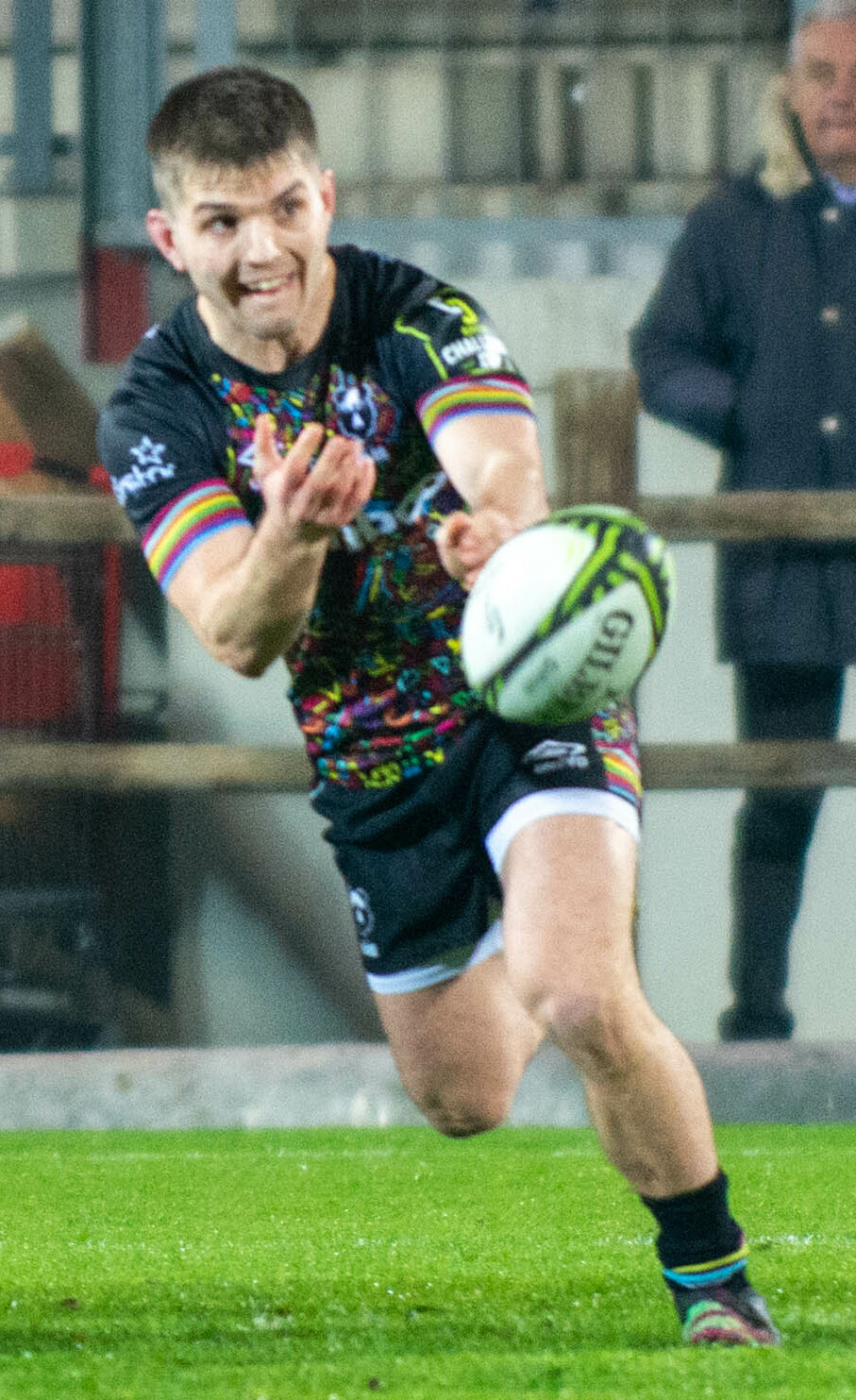
- Born: Harry Alan J. Randall; 18 December 1997 (age 28) Slough, Berkshire, England
- Height: 1.70 m (5 ft 7 in)
- Weight: 79 kg (12 st 6 lb; 174 lb)

Rugby union career
- Position: Scrum-half
- Current team: Bristol Bears
Senior career
Years	Team	Apps	(Points)
2016–2018	Hartpury	25	(75)
2018–	Bristol Bears	150	(165)
- Correct as of 18 January 2025
International career
Years	Team	Apps	(Points)
2016–2017	England U20s	14	(10)
2021–	England	14	(10)
- Correct as of 22 February 2025

Harry Alan J. Randall (born 18 December 1997) is an English professional rugby union player who plays as a scrum-half for Bristol Bears in Premiership Rugby. Harry Randall is the younger brother of Jake Randall, the Scarlets youngest ever player. He was educated at Hartpury College and Hartpury University.

== Club career ==
Randall was born in Slough, England, but moved aged four to the Amman Valley, Wales. He first played rugby at Tycroes. He played for Llandovery College and Wales under-16s. At 17 Randall joined Hartpury College and played for England under-18s.

He signed for Bristol in 2018 and was described by the Bristol Post as "one of the most exciting young talents in the country". On 16 October 2020 Randall scored a try after 15 seconds in the final of the European Rugby Challenge Cup as Bristol defeated Toulon to win their first European trophy.

== International career ==
Randall was a member of the England under-20 team that hosted the 2016 World Rugby Under 20 Championship and came off the bench as England defeated Ireland in the final. During the 2017 Six Nations Under 20s Championship he scored tries against Wales and Scotland and started in the last game which saw England defeat Ireland to complete the grand slam. Later that year Randall started in the final of the 2017 World Rugby Under 20 Championship as England finished runners up to New Zealand.

In January 2021 he was called into the England Senior team for the 2021 Six Nations. On 4 July 2021 Randall made his debut for the senior England team starting against the United States at Twickenham. He scored a try and was named player of the match.

On 18 October 2021 Randall was named as part of England's squad for the 2021 Autumn Nations Series. However, he withdrew from the squad on 31 October due to injury. He was replaced by Northampton Saints scrum-half Alex Mitchell.

As a result of his performances in the Gallagher Premiership and European Cup Competition, Randall was again called up to the England squad for the 2022 Six Nations Championship. Playing 4 of the 5 games in the championship.

After an injury to first choice scrum half Alex Mitchell, Randall was called up by Head Coach Steve Borthwick to train with the England squad for the 2024 Six Nations Championship. He was then moved to the England A squad, coached by George Skivington, in preparation for their fixture against Portugal.

=== International tries ===
As of 16 November 2021

Try	Opposing team	Location	Venue	Competition	Date	Result	Score
1	United States	London, England	Twickenham Stadium	2021 July rugby union tests	4 July 2021	Win	43 – 29
