= George Hammond (rugby union) =

English rugby union player

- Born: 31 July 2000 (age 26) Worthing, England
- Height: 1.98 m (6 ft 6 in)
- Weight: 118 kg (18 st 8 lb; 260 lb)
- School: Whitgift School

Rugby union career
- Position: Lock
- Current team: Suntory Sungoliath
Senior career
Years	Team	Apps	(Points)
2018–2025	Harlequins	88	(55)
2025–	Suntory Sungoliath	15	(5)
- Correct as of 13 August 2025

George Hammond (born 31 July 2000) is an English professional rugby union player who plays for Japan Rugby League One side Tokyo Sungoliath. His main position is lock.

== Early life ==
Hammond was born and raised in Worthing, England. At the age of 16 he won a scholarship to Whitgift School.

== Club career ==
=== Harlequins ===
Hammond first joined Harlequins at the age of 12. In September 2020, he made his debut in the Premiership against rivals London Irish.

In the 2020-21 season, Hammond made his European debut starting against Ulster in the European Challenge Cup. He would go on to win the Premiership as part of the Quins squad later that season as they beat Exeter Chiefs 40–38 in the highest scoring final to date. Although Hammond did not play in the final, his minutes throughout season meant he was part of the winning squad. In March 2023, he signed an extension to stay at Harlequins.

In February 2025, he captained the side during a 33–14 victory against London Scottish in the Premiership Cup. He left Harlequins at the end of the season.

=== Tokyo Sungoliath ===
In August 2025, he signed for Japan Rugby League One side Tokyo Sungoliath.

== International career ==
Hammond has represented England at U17, U18 and U20 levels.

== Honours ==
Harlequins

- Premiership Rugby: 2020–21
