= Tom James (rugby union, born 1993) =

English rugby union player

- Born: 12 October 1993 (age 33) Yeovil, England
- Height: 1.84 m (6 ft 0 in)
- Weight: 93 kg (14 st 9 lb)
- School: Sherborne School
- University: Loughborough University

Rugby union career
- Position: Scrum-half
- Current team: Northampton Saints
Senior career
Years	Team	Apps	(Points)
2016–2017	Bedford Blues	17	(15)
2017–2020	Doncaster Knights	68	(132)
2020–	Northampton Saints	108	(114)
- Correct as of 3 January 2026

Tom James (born 12 October 1993) is an English professional rugby union player currently playing for Northampton Saints in Premiership Rugby. His position is scrum-half.

== Career ==
James was educated at Sherborne School before going on to study at Loughborough University. Whilst there he played for Loughborough Students RUFC.

After completing his studies James signed for Bedford Blues in the RFU Championship for the 2016/17 season.

He then made the switch to fellow RFU Championship side Doncaster Knights.

On 21 April 2020 it was announced that James would join Northampton Saints in the Premiership from the 2020/21 season.
