= Alex Mitchell (rugby union) =

English rugby union footballer

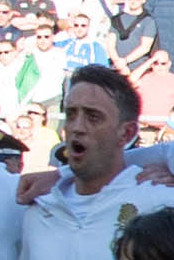
- Mitchell in 2024
- Full name: Alexander Arthur David Mitchell
- Born: 25 May 1997 (age 29) Maidstone, England
- Height: 1.78 m (5 ft 10 in)
- Weight: 81 kg (179 lb; 12 st 11 lb)
- School: Lymm High School
- Notable relative: James Mitchell (brother)

Rugby union career
- Position: Scrum-half
- Current team: Northampton Saints
Senior career
Years	Team	Apps	(Points)
2015	Moseley	1	(5)
2017–	Northampton Saints	153	(279)
- Correct as of 3 January 2026
International career
Years	Team	Apps	(Points)
2014–2015	England U18	14	(5)
2016–2017	England U20	9	(20)
2019	England XV	1	(0)
2021–	England	27	(20)
2025	British & Irish Lions	2	(0)
- Correct as of 2 August 2025

Alexander Arthur David Mitchell (born 25 May 1997) is an English professional rugby union player who plays as a scrum-half for Premiership Rugby club Northampton Saints and the England national team.

== Club career ==
His older brother James Mitchell is also a professional rugby union player who joined Northampton Saints from Connacht during the 2019 Rugby World Cup. Alex Mitchell was educated at Lymm High School. His other brother Jordan is also an exceptional scrum half and an excellent cricketer. During his time at Lymm, he played against Tom Curry and Ben Curry in the NatWest Schools Cup, where Lymm lost to Oundle School at the Quarter Final stage.

Mitchell was formerly a member of the Sale Sharks system before joining the Northampton Saints academy in 2015. His debut season of 2017–2018 he made nine appearances for Northampton. The following campaign saw him start for the side that defeated Saracens in the final of the Premiership Rugby Cup.

Mitchell scored two tries in their 2023–24 European Rugby Champions Cup quarter-final victory over Bulls and then started in the semi-final elimination against Leinster. At the end of that season he scored the winning try in the 2023–24 Premiership Rugby final as Northampton beat Bath to become league champions.

Mitchell played in their 2024–25 European Rugby Champions Cup quarter-final win over Castres and semi-final victory against Leinster. He started the 2025 European Rugby Champions Cup final at Millennium Stadium as Northampton were defeated by Bordeaux Bègles to finish runners-up.

== International career ==
=== England ===
Mitchell represented England at under-16 and under-17 level. In March 2015, he scored a try for England under-18 against France at the Rugby Europe Under-18 Championship.

Mitchell received his first call-up to the England under-20 team in October 2015 and was a member of the side that completed the grand slam during the 2017 Six Nations Under 20s Championship. Mitchell was also a member of the squad at the 2017 World Rugby Under 20 Championship, scoring tries in pool fixtures against Samoa and Wales. He also scored tries in the semi-final against South Africa and defeat against New Zealand in the final as England finished runners up.

In June 2019, Mitchell started for an England XV in the non-cap Quilter Cup against the Barbarians at Twickenham. In October 2020, Mitchell was called up to a senior England training squad by head coach Eddie Jones and following an injury to Willi Heinz, Mitchell was called into the squad as backup to Ben Youngs and Dan Robson for the conclusion of the 2020 Six Nations Championship.

In October 2021, Mitchell was called up to the England squad for their 2021 Autumn Nations Series match against Tonga, replacing the injured Harry Randall. On 6 November 2021, Mitchell made his England debut off the bench as a replacement for Ben Youngs against Tonga and scored his first try as part of England's 69–3 victory.

After making his debut Mitchell did not feature for England again until the 2023 Six Nations Championship. Later that year, he was initially not included in the squad for the 2023 Rugby World Cup however an injury to Jack van Poortvliet led to his selection. Mitchell ended up as first choice during the tournament starting in three of their pool fixtures. In the knockout phase, he started the quarter-final victory over Fiji and semi-final elimination against champions South Africa as England ultimately finished third with the bronze medal.

=== British and Irish Lions ===
Mitchell was selected by coach Andy Farrell for the 2025 British & Irish Lions tour to Australia. He started the opening game of the tour against Argentina. Mitchell scored tries in warm-up victories over Western Force and New South Wales Waratahs.

In the opening match of the Test series, Mitchell made an appearance as a replacement for Jamison Gibson-Park. He remained on the bench as an unused substitute in the next match at Melbourne Cricket Ground which the Lions also won to claim their first series win in twelve years. Mitchell again featured as a replacement in their last game of the tour as the Wallabies prevented a whitewash.

== Career statistics ==
=== List of international tries ===
as of 15 March 2025

No.	Date	Venue	Opponent	Score	Result	Competition	Ref.
1	6 November 2021	Twickenham Stadium, London, England	Tonga	67–3	69–3	2021 end-of-year rugby union internationals	
2	3 February 2024	Stadio Olimpico, Rome, Italy	Italy	19–17	27–24	2024 Six Nations Championship	
3	22 June 2024	Japan National Stadium, Tokyo, Japan	Japan	31–3	52–17	2024 tour of Japan	
4	15 March 2025	Principality Stadium, Cardiff, Wales	Wales	38-7	68–14	2025 Six Nations Championship	

== Honours ==
Northampton

- Premiership Rugby: 2023–24, 2025–26
- Premiership Rugby Cup: 2018–19
- European Rugby Champions Cup runner-up: 2024–25

England

- Rugby World Cup
  - (bronze) Third place: 2023
