= James Williams (rugby union) =

English rugby union player

- Full name: James Williams
- Born: 24 February 1997 (age 29) England
- Height: 177 cm (5 ft 10 in)
- Weight: 91 kg (201 lb; 14 st 5 lb)
- School: Queen Elizabeth High School

Rugby union career
- Position: Fly-half, Inside Centre
- Current team: Bristol Bears
Senior career
Years	Team	Apps	(Points)
2016-2017	Birmingham Moseley	22	(226)
2017-2018	Hartpury University	23	(97)
2018-2019	Worcester Warriors	1	(0)
2018-2019	→ Birmingham Moseley (loan)	25	(266)
2019-2020	Sale Sharks	3	(9)
2019-2020	→ Sale FC (loan)	9	(42)
2020-2022	Hartpury University	29	(187)
2022-	Bristol Bears	53	(141)
2022-2023	→ Hartpury University (loan)	7	(39)
Total		170	(1,007)
- Correct as of 12 October 2023
International career
Years	Team	Apps	(Points)
2023	Barbarians	1	(4)
- Correct as of 12 October 2023

James Williams (born 24 February 1997) is an English rugby union player who plays as a fly-half or inside centre for Bristol Bears in the Premiership.

== Club career ==
=== Birmingham Moseley ===
Williams began his career at Birmingham Moseley in the National League One, after an outstanding campaign in his first season at Birmingham where he was awarded the coach's award, he was signed by Hartpury.

While at Worcester Warriors he spent time on loan at his former club, playing in 25 matches starting 24.

=== Hartpury University ===
At his first season at Hartpury he made 23 appearances in his first season, he was soon signed to Premiership side Worcester Warriors.

In 2020 after 2 years in the Premiership he rejoined Hartpury for 2 seasons. In the 2021/22 season he was the Championship top points scorer with 150 points. He was named in the RFU Championship Team of the Season. Due to his impressive performances he was signed by Bristol Bears.

While at Bristol Bears he spent some time on loan at his former club featuring 7 times.

=== Worcester Warriors ===
He made his only appearance for Worcester starting at inside centre in the Premiership Rugby Cup, he played 80 minutes in the 34–22 loss against Saracens. At Worcester he spent time on loan at Birmingham Moseley.

=== Sale Sharks ===
In 2019 he joined fellow Premiership side Sale Sharks, making his debut in the Premiership Rugby Cup. Coming off the bench in a win over Saracens. He made two further appearances in the Champions Cup, starting in losses against La Rochelle and Glasgow Warriors.

=== Sale FC ===
While at Sale Sharks, Williams spent time on loan at National League One side Sale FC, scoring 42 points in 9 appearances.

=== Bristol Bears ===
Williams made his return to the Premiership fold starting in the Premiership Rugby Cup against the Exeter Chiefs. He made his first full Premiership appearance against Saracens, starting at inside centre he slotted 2 penalties however it wasn't enough in the end with Bristol losing 20–19. Williams impressive first season was rewarded with being called up to Pat Lam's Barbarians side.

== International career ==
Williams featured for the Barbarians in a 2023 Rugby World Cup warm-up against Samoa with invitational side falling 28–14, with Williams converting the Barbarians only two tries.
