= Ehren Painter =

English rugby union player

- Born: Ehren Beau Painter; 21 March 1998 (age 28) London, England
- Height: 1.93 m (6 ft 4 in)
- Weight: 145 kg (22 st 12 lb)
- School: Mayflower High School and Felsted School

Rugby union career
- Position: Tighthead Prop
- Current team: Exeter Chiefs
Senior career
Years	Team	Apps	(Points)
2018–2023	Northampton Saints	84	(5)
2023–	Exeter Chiefs	16	(15)
- Correct as of 2 April 2024
International career
Years	Team	Apps	(Points)
2016	England U18	5	(0)
2018	England U20	8	(0)
- Correct as of 17 June 2018

Ehren Beau M. Painter (born 21 March 1998) is an English professional rugby union player who plays as a Tighthead Prop for Premiership Rugby club Exeter Chiefs.

== Career ==
Painter was born in London, and educated at Felsted School. He represented England at Under-16, Under-17, and Under-18 level.

Painter was a member of the England Under-20 side that competed in the 2018 Six Nations Under 20s Championship. He was included in the squad for the 2018 World Rugby Under 20 Championship and started in the final as England finished runners up to hosts France.

In April 2018, Painter made his first-team debut for the Northampton Saints in a Premiership match against Saracens. In June 2022 he started in a league semi-final as Northampton were eliminated by Leicester Tigers.

On 14 March 2023, Exeter Chiefs announced the immediate signing of Painter.
