= 2021–22 Premiership Rugby =

Rugby union competition in England

2021–22 Gallagher Premiership
- Countries: England
- Number of teams: 13
- Date: 17 September 2021 – 18 June 2022
- Champions: Leicester Tigers (11th title)
- Runners-up: Saracens
- Relegated: no relegation
- Matches played: 156
- Attendance: 2,003,253 (average 12,841 per match)
- Highest attendance: 72,735 – Harlequins v Northampton Saints, 27 December 2021
- Lowest attendance: 3,376 – Newcastle Falcons v Worcester Warriors, 27 November 2021
- Tries scored: 1055 (average 6.8 per match)
- Top point scorer: (England) George Ford (Leicester Tigers) – 220 points
- Top try scorer: (England) Max Malins (Saracens) – 16 tries

Official website
- www.premiershiprugby.com

The 2021–22 Premiership Rugby was the 35th season of the top flight of English domestic rugby union competition and the fourth to be sponsored by Gallagher. It is also the first since 1992–93 to feature thirteen teams. The competition was broadcast by BT Sport for the ninth successive season with four league season games and the final also simulcast free-to-air on ITV. Highlights of each weekend's games were shown on ITV with extended highlights on BT Sport.

The reigning champions entering the season were Harlequins who claimed their 2nd title after defeating Exeter Chiefs in the 2021 final. Saracens were promoted as champions from the 2020–21 RFU Championship at the first attempt.

Due to changes to the global rugby calendar implemented in 2020 and the COVID-19 pandemic causing a moratorium to be placed on relegation last season, the tournament features thirteen teams and will include an extra four rounds. The season would take place over 40 weeks.

== Rule changes ==
This season sees the second year of a three-year moratorium on relegation from the league.

== Salary cap ==
This season is the first under the reduced salary cap regulations before changes are made before 2024–25. A brief summary of the changes are:

- Senior ceiling is reduced from £6.4m to £5m.
- Homegrown player credits retained up to £600,000
- International and EPS credits retained but limited to £400,000.
- Season-long loan salary cap exemption is removed.
- Academy ceiling for international players retained at £100,000 but with maximum salary increasing from £30,000 to £50,000. Homegrown academy players are not counted in the £100,000 limit.
- For contracts continuing into 2021–22, the cap cost will be counted at 75% of their actual value to manage transition to the new caps.
- Two players continue to be excluded from the salary cap for this season.

== Teams ==
For the first time since the 2002–03 Premiership Rugby season, all teams from the previous season will compete in the league together with Saracens who were promoted from the 2020–21 RFU Championship after an absence of one year, thus making a thirteen team league.

=== Stadiums and locations ===
2021–22 Gallagher Premiership teams
2021-22 Gallacher Premiership teams in Greater London

Club	Director of Rugby/ Head Coach	Captain	Kit supplier	Stadium	Capacity	City/Area
Bath	(England) Stuart Hooper	(England) Charlie Ewels	Macron	The Recreation Ground	14,509	Bath, Somerset
Bristol Bears	(Samoa) Pat Lam	(New Zealand) Steve Luatua	Umbro	Ashton; Gate	27,000	Bristol
Exeter Chiefs	(England) Rob Baxter (England) Ali Hepher	(England) Jack Yeandle	Samurai Sportswear	Sandy Park	13,593	Exeter, Devon
Gloucester	(England) George Skivington	(England) Lewis Ludlow	Oxen Sports	Kingsholm	16,115	Gloucester
Harlequins	(Australia) Billy Millard (Note: Director of Rugby Performance) (New Zealand) Tabai Matson	(South Africa) Stephan Lewies	Adidas	Twickenham Stoop (Note: Harlequins would also play two home games at Twickenham Stadium on 27 December 2021 and 21 May 2022.)	14,800	Twickenham, Greater London
Leicester Tigers	(England) Steve Borthwick	(England) Ellis Genge	Samurai Sportswear	Welford Road	25,849	Leicester
London Irish	(Ireland) Declan Kidney (Australia) Les Kiss	(England) Matt Rogerson	BLK	Brentford Community Stadium	17,250	Brentford, Greater London
Newcastle Falcons	(England) Dean Richards (England) Dave Walder	(England) Mark Wilson (Note: Wilson retired from rugby with immediate effect on 14 February 2022.)	Macron	Kingston Park	10,200	Newcastle upon Tyne
Northampton Saints	(New Zealand) Chris Boyd	(England) Lewis Ludlam	Macron	Franklin's Gardens	15,200	Northampton
Sale Sharks	(England) Alex Sanderson (England) Paul Deacon	(South Africa) Jono Ross	Macron	AJ Bell Stadium	12,000	Salford, Greater Manchester
Saracens	(Ireland) Mark McCall (Note: McCall took a short break from his role for medical reasons, from 28 January to 1 March 2022.) (England) Joe Shaw	(England) Owen Farrell	Castore	StoneX Stadium (Note: Saracens would also play one home game at Tottenham Hotspur Stadium on 26 March 2022.)	8,500 (Note: StoneX Stadium capacity was temporarily reduced at the start of the season due to redevelopment, but gradually rose above 8,500 from February 2022.)	Hendon, Greater London
Wasps	(England) Lee Blackett	(England) Joe Launchbury	Hummel	Coventry Building Society Arena	32,609	Coventry, West Midlands
Worcester Warriors	(South Africa) Alan Solomons (England) Steve Diamond	(England) Ted Hill	O'Neills	Sixways Stadium	11,499	Worcester

== Table ==
2021–22 Premiership Rugby Table
Pos	Team	Pld	W	D	L	PF	PA	PD	TF	TA	TB	LB	Pts	Qualification
1	Leicester Tigers (C)	24	20	0	4	726	452	+274	88	52	11	3	94	Play-off place, Berth in the 2022–23 European Rugby Champions Cup
2	Saracens (RU)	24	17	1	6	769	509	+260	93	60	12	5	87	Play-off place, Berth in the 2022–23 European Rugby Champions Cup
3	Harlequins (SF)	24	15	0	9	647	554	+93	95	68	14	6	80	Play-off place, Berth in the 2022–23 European Rugby Champions Cup
4	Northampton Saints (SF)	24	14	0	10	764	639	+125	99	82	14	5	75	Play-off place, Berth in the 2022–23 European Rugby Champions Cup
5	Gloucester	24	13	1	10	685	525	+160	92	67	12	7	73 (Note: Cancelled Fixture: Newcastle Falcons 4pts; Sale Sharks 2pts; Cancelled Fixture: London Irish 4pts; Bath 2pts; Cancelled Fixture: Gloucester 5pts; Worcester Warriors 0pts)	Berth in the 2022–23 European Rugby Champions Cup
6	Sale Sharks	24	12	3	9	559	495	+64	75	64	11	3	70	Berth in the 2022–23 European Rugby Champions Cup
7	Exeter Chiefs	24	13	0	11	584	534	+50	82	67	9	8	69	Berth in the 2022–23 European Rugby Champions Cup
8	London Irish	24	9	5	10	660	666	−6	93	88	14	3	63	Berth in the 2022–23 European Rugby Champions Cup
9	Wasps	24	11	1	12	614	600	+14	76	81	8	6	60	2022–23 European Rugby Challenge Cup
10	Bristol Bears	24	8	0	16	573	718	−145	73	98	11	5	48	2022–23 European Rugby Challenge Cup
11	Worcester Warriors	24	6	1	17	451	814	−363	62	121	7	2	35	2022–23 European Rugby Challenge Cup
12	Newcastle Falcons	24	6	1	17	436	660	−224	57	87	4	4	34	2022–23 European Rugby Challenge Cup
13	Bath	24	5	1	18	461	763	−302	57	107	4	6	34	2022–23 European Rugby Challenge Cup

Source: Premiership Rugby
Rules for classification: Games cancelled due to COVID-19 will be recorded as 0–0, but a win and 4 points will be awarded if a club was able to field a team, and a loss and 2 points if they were not. Games cancelled for other reasons will be recorded as 20–0, with a win and 5 points awarded to the club that was able to field a team, and a loss and 0 points for the club that could not.
Tiebreakers for teams tied on points: 1) Number of matches won; 2) Difference between points for and against; 3) Total number of points for; 4) Aggregate number of points scored in matches between tied teams; 5) Number of matches won excluding the first match, then the second and so on until the tie is settled
(C) Champions; (RU) Runners-up; (SF) Losing semi-finalists

== Regular season ==
Fixtures for the season were announced by Premiership Rugby on 13 July 2021. The league season begins on 17 September 2021 and is due to end on 18 June 2022. Each team receives two bye weeks. Highlights of the season include:

- Big Game 13 – Harlequins played host to Northampton Saints in this season's edition of The Big Game at Twickenham Stadium on 27 December 2021.
- The Showdown 2 – Saracens played host to Bristol Bears in this season's edition of The Showdown at Tottenham Hotspur Stadium on 26 March 2022.
- Big Summer Kick-Off – Harlequins played host to Gloucester in this season's edition of the Big Summer Kick-Off at Twickenham Stadium on 21 May 2022.

All fixtures are subject to change.

=== Round 1 ===
17 September 2021
19:45

Bristol Bears	9 – 26	Saracens
Pen: Sheedy (3/4) 5', 15', 18'	Report	Try: Lewington 70' m Pen: Lozowski (7/8) 11', 33', 40', 45', 47', 59', 65'

Ashton Gate
Attendance: 19,003
Referee: Wayne Barnes

18 September 2021
15:00

(1 BP) Leicester Tigers	34 – 19	Exeter Chiefs
Try: Steward 12' m Potter 23' m Scott 37' c Dolly (2) 60' c, 68' c Con: Ford (3/5) 38', 61', 69'; Pen: Ford (1/2) 3'	Report	Try: Armand 16' m Penalty try 55'; Hidalgo-Clyne 80+1' c Con: H. Skinner (1/1) 80+1'

Welford Road
Attendance: 17,333
Referee: Ian Tempest

18 September 2021
15:00

(1 BP) Northampton Saints	34 – 20	Gloucester
Try: Furbank 8' c J. Grayson 44' c Auterac 47' c Wood 74' m Con: J. Grayson (3/4) 9', 45', 48'; Pen: J. Grayson (2/2) 6', 58'	Report	Try: Thorley 26' m J. Reid 55' c May 68' m Con: L. Evans (1/2) 56'; Pen: L. Evans (1/1) 42'

Franklin's Gardens
Attendance: 12,694
Referee: Karl Dickson

18 September 2021
15:00

(1 BP) Worcester Warriors	36 – 24	London Irish (1 BP)
Try: Lewis 17' c Heinz 38' m Nanai 40+1' c Kvesic 52' c Humphreys 70' c Con: O. Williams (4/5) 17', 40+2', 52', 71'; Pen: O. Williams (1/1) 64'	Report	Try: Hassell-Collins 7' m Tuisue 46' m Hoskins (2) 65' c, 74' c Con: Jackson (2/4) 66', 75'

Sixways
Attendance: 5,163
Referee: Craig Maxwell-Keys

18 September 2021
17:00

Sale Sharks	20 – 19	Bath (1 BP)
Try: Yarde 30' c McGuigan 35' c Con: R. du Preez (2/2) 31', 36'; Pen: R. du Preez (1/3) 24'; Wilkinson (1/1) 79'	Report	Try: Schoeman 53' c Con: Bailey (1/1) 54'; Pen: Cipriani (2/3) 39', 44'; Bailey (2/3) 68', 75'

AJ Bell Stadium
Attendance: 7,500
Referee: Christophe Ridley

19 September 2021
15:00

(1 BP) Newcastle Falcons	20 – 26	Harlequins (1 BP)
Try: Radwan 23' m Stephens 28' c Schreuder 54' m Con: Connon (1/3) 29'; Pen: Haydon-Wood (1/1) 80+1'	Report	Try: Lynagh (2) 12' m, 44' m Marchant 21' c Care 59' c Con: Allan (2/4) 22', 60'

Kingston Park
Attendance: 6,114
Referee: Tom Foley

Bye/s: Wasps

=== Round 2 ===
24 September 2021
19:45

(2 BP) Gloucester	26 – 33	Leicester Tigers (1 BP)
Try: Balmain 17' c Ackermann 34' m M. Atkinson 57' c Clement 72' c Con: L. Evans (2/3) 18', 57'; Hastings (1/1) 73'	Report	Try: Wells 12' c Genge 27' m Potter 53' c Dolly 67' m Con: Ford (2/4) 14', 54'; Pen: Ford (3/5) 4', 7', 63'

Kingsholm
Attendance: 11,640
Referee: Tom Foley

25 September 2021
15:00

(1 BP) Bath	13 – 20	Newcastle Falcons
Try: Ojomoh 70' c Con: Bailey (1/1) 72'; Pen: Bailey (2/3) 28', 80+1'	Report	Try: Radwan 11' m Stephens 34' m McGuigan 40' c Con: Haydon-Wood (1/3) 40+1'; Pen: Haydon-Wood (1/2) 16'

Recreation Ground
Attendance: 12,569
Referee: Craig Maxwell-Keys

25 September 2021
15:00

(1 BP) Exeter Chiefs	24 – 26	Northampton Saints
Try: Armand 5' c J. Maunder 7' c Tuima 39' c Con: J. Simmonds (3/3) 6', 8', 40'; Pen: J. Simmonds (1/2) 58'	Report	Try: Mitchell 13' c Proctor 21' c Con: J. Grayson (2/2) 14', 22'; Pen: J. Grayson (2/2) 33', 65'; Furbank (2/2) 71', 80'

Sandy Park
Attendance: 9,843
Referee: Christophe Ridley

25 September 2021
15:00

(1 BP) Harlequins	35 – 29	Worcester Warriors (2 BP)
Try: Lynagh 17' c Dombrandt 30' c Murley 40+1' c Marchant 54' c Lamb 74' c Con: Allan (5/5) 17', 31', 40+2', 55', 75'	Report	Try: Lawrence 43' c Heinz 59' c Chudley 64' c M. Thomas 80+1' m Con: O. Williams (3/3) 44', 60', 64'; Pen: O. Williams (1/2) 3'

Twickenham Stoop
Attendance: 14,290
Referee: Sara Cox

25 September 2021
15:00

(1 BP) Wasps	44 – 8	Bristol Bears
Try: Crossdale (2) 13' m, 36' m Shields 44' c Frost 60' c T. Willis 78' c Kibirige 80+1' c Con: Gopperth (4/4) 46', 60', 80', 80+2'; Pen: Umaga (2/3) 20', 31'	Report	Try: Lahiff 28' m Pen: Sheedy (1/1) 3'

Coventry Building Society Arena
Attendance: 8,500
Referee: Karl Dickson

26 September 2021
15:00

(1 BP) London Irish	31 – 31	Sale Sharks (1 BP)
Try: B. White 17' c Creevy 33' c Parton (2) 47' m, 67' m Rona 77' c Con: Jackson (3/5) 18', 34', 78'	Report	Try: MacGinty 2' c Yarde 15' c S. James 21' c Cliff 37' c Con: MacGinty (4/4) 3', 15', 23', 38'; Pen: MacGinty (1/1) 30'

Brentford Community Stadium
Attendance: 6,720
Referee: Wayne Barnes

Bye/s: Saracens

=== Round 3 ===
1 October 2021
19:45

Bristol Bears	25 – 20	Bath (1 BP)
Try: Luatua 31' m Penalty try 57'; Kerr 67' c Con: Sheedy (1/2) 68'; Pen: Sheedy (2/2) 8', 47'	Report	Try: Muir (2) 17' c, 52' m Rokoduguni 40+2' m Con: Bailey (1/3) 19'; Pen: Bailey (1/1) 29'

Ashton Gate
Attendance: 23,438
Referee: Ian Tempest

2 October 2021
14:00

Northampton Saints	23 – 21	London Irish
Try: Collins 9' c Proctor 16' c Con: Biggar (2/2) 10', 17'; Pen: Biggar (3/3) 3', 59', 74'	Report	Try: Creevy 38' c Penalty try 46'; Parton 64' c Con: Jackson (2/2) 38', 65'

Franklin's Gardens
Attendance: 9,222
Referee: Tom Foley

2 October 2021
15:00

Leicester Tigers	13 – 12	Saracens (1 BP)
Try: Penalty try 80+4'; Pen: Ford (2/2) 40+2', 75'	Report	Pen: Farrell (4/5) 9', 11', 33', 49'

Welford Road
Attendance: 17,500
Referee: Christophe Ridley

2 October 2021
15:00

Newcastle Falcons	18 – 14	Wasps (1 BP)
Try: Fearns 4' m Chick 80' c Con: Connon (1/1)	Report	Try: Cruse 50' c T. Willis 75' c Con: Umaga (2/2) 50', 75'

Kingston Park
Attendance: 5,337
Referee: Anthony Woodthorpe

2 October 2021
15:00

Worcester Warriors	23 – 31	Gloucester
Try: Hatherell 72' c Vailanu 80+2' c Con: Searle (2/2) 73', 80+3'; Pen: O. Williams (2/3) 31', 42'; Searle (1/1) 52'	Report	Try: Morgan 59' c Woodward 66' c C. Harris 76' m Con: Hastings (2/3) 60', 67'; Pen: Hastings (4/4) 9', 18', 32', 40+1'

Sixways
Attendance: 7,609
Referee: Andrew Jackson

3 October 2021
15:00

Sale Sharks	15 – 25	Exeter Chiefs
Try: Harrison 4' c Ashman 71' m Con: R. du Preez (1/2) 6'; Pen: R. du Preez (1/2) 11'	Report	Try: Slade (2) 40' c, 55' m Witty 57' c Con: Slade (2/3) 40+2', 59'; Pen: Slade (3/3) 21', 43'

AJ Bell Stadium
Attendance: 5,034
Referee: Craig Maxwell-Keys

Bye/s: Harlequins

=== Round 4 ===
8 October 2021
19:45

(1 BP) Harlequins	52 – 24	Bristol Bears
Try: Lynagh (2) 28' c, 48' c Esterhuizen 51' m Northmore 56' c Collier 58' c Green 63' m M. Smith 72' c Dombrandt 77' c Con: M. Smith (6/8) 30', 48', 56', 59', 73', 78'	Report	Try: Joyce 14' c Purdy 19' c Piutau 26' c Con: Sheedy (3/3) 15', 20', 26'; Pen: Sheedy (1/1) 40+2'

Twickenham Stoop
Attendance: 14,475
Referee: Wayne Barnes

9 October 2021
15:00

(1 BP) Exeter Chiefs	42 – 5	Worcester Warriors
Try: Ewers 22' c S. Simmonds (2) 33' c, 48' c Cordero (2) 40+4' c, 43' c J. Simmonds 74' c Con: Slade (5/5) 23', 34', 40+5', 46', 50'; J. Simmonds (1/1) 75'	Report	Try: Clegg 78' m

Sandy Park
Attendance: 12,627
Referee: Tom Foley

9 October 2021
15:00

(1 BP) Gloucester	33 – 32	Sale Sharks (2 BP)
Try: Morgan 12' m Singleton 18' c Rees-Zammit (2) 35' m, 63' c Con: Hastings (2/4) 19', 64'; Pen: Hastings (2/2) 8', 47'	Report	Try: Quirke 32' c Reed 50' m D. du Preez 75' c Warr 80' m Taylor 80+4' m Con: Wilkinson (1/2) 33'; Curtis (1/3) 76'; Pen: Wilkinson (1/1) 40+2'

Kingsholm
Attendance: 13,500
Referee: Christophe Ridley

9 October 2021
15:00

(1 BP) London Irish	16 – 21	Leicester Tigers
Try: Creevy 55' c Con: Jackson (1/1) 56'; Pen: Jackson (3/3) 27', 37', 46'	Report	Try: Dolly 19' m Liebenberg 49' c Con: Ford (1/2) 51'; Pen: Ford (3/4) 63', 72', 78'

Brentford Community Stadium
Attendance: 7,878
Referee: Adam Leal

9 October 2021
15:00

(1 BP) Saracens	37 – 23	Newcastle Falcons
Try: Penalty try 37'; George 48' c Mak. Vunipola 53' c B. Vunipola 80+3' c Con: Farrell (3/3) 49', 54', 80+4'; Pen: Farrell (3/3) 14', 59', 77'	Report	Try: Brown 16' c Stevenson 21' c Con: Connon (2/2) 17', 22'; Pen: Connon (3/3) 31', 69', 79'

StoneX Stadium
Attendance: 8,020
Referee: Ian Tempest

10 October 2021
15:00

Wasps	26 – 20	Northampton Saints (1 BP)
Try: Kibirige 18' c Robson 59' c Con: Umaga (2/2) 19', 59'; Pen: Umaga (2/5) 34', 51'; Gopperth (2/3) 69', 72'	Report	Try: S. Matavesi 13' c Ludlam 63' m Fish 80+2' m Con: Biggar (1/2) 14'; Pen: Biggar (1/1) 27'

Coventry Building Society Arena
Attendance: 11,423
Referee: Craig Maxwell-Keys

Bye/s: Bath

=== Round 5 ===
15 October 2021
19:45

Sale Sharks	28 – 22	Harlequins (1 BP)
Try: Quirke (2) 14' c, 79' m Ross 40+1' c Con: Wilkinson (2/2) 15', 40+2'; Pen: Wilkinson (2/5) 23', 49'; Curtis (1/1) 76'	Report	Try: Care 18' c Green 36' c Northmore 41' m Con: M. Smith (2/3) 19', 34'; Pen: M. Smith (1/1) 64'

AJ Bell Stadium
Attendance: 8,214
Referee: Tom Foley

16 October 2021
15:00

Newcastle Falcons	13 – 5	Bristol Bears
Try: Chick 39' c Con: Connon (1/1) 40+1'; Pen: Connon (2/3) 70', 75'	Report	Try: Leiua 55' m

Kingston Park
Attendance: 6,746
Referee: Christophe Ridley

16 October 2021
15:00

(1 BP) Wasps	23 – 27	Exeter Chiefs (1 BP)
Try: Frost 34' c Young 40' c Con: Gopperth (2/2) 35', 40+1'; Pen: Gopperth (3/3) 5', 19', 59'	Report	Try: Slade 21' m Cordero 25' c S. Simmonds 61' c J. Hill 68' m Con: Slade (2/4) 27', 62'; Pen: Slade (1/1) 9'

Coventry Building Society Arena
Attendance: 8,247
Referee: Wayne Barnes

16 October 2021
15:00

Worcester Warriors	3 – 48	Leicester Tigers (1 BP)
Pen: Searle (1/1) 17'	Report	Try: Potter 12' c Moroni 27' m Montoya 33' c Wigglesworth 57' c Dolly 69' m Nadolo 72' c Burns 75' c Con: Ford (3/4) 13', 34', 58'; Burns (2/3) 74', 77'; Pen: Ford (1/1) 6'

Sixways
Attendance: 7,633
Referee: Luke Pearce

17 October 2021
15:00

Bath	17 – 71	Saracens (1 BP)
Try: de Glanville 42' c Ellis 75' m Muir 77' m Con: Cipriani (1/1) 43'	Report	Try: Itoje 6' c Malins (3) 16' c, 29' c, 58' c George (2) 28' c, 40+3' c Earl 38' c Mawi 55' c Segun 67' m D. Morris 71' c Con: Farrell (8/8) 7', 17', 28', 31', 39', 40+4', 56', 60'; Goode (1/2) 72'; Pen: Farrell (1/1) 3'

Recreation Ground
Attendance: 14,509
Referee: Jack Makepeace

17 October 2021
15:00

London Irish	25 – 25	Gloucester
Try: Creevy 12' c Curtis-Harris 19' c Rogerson 67' m Con: Jackson (2/3) 13', 20'; Pen: Jackson (2/2) 42', 52'	Report	Try: Morgan (2) 48' m, 55' c Rees-Zammit 59' c Con: Hastings (2/3) 56', 60'; Pen: Hastings (2/2) 22', 24'

Brentford Community Stadium
Attendance: 6,849
Referee: Karl Dickson

Bye/s: Northampton Saints

=== Round 6 ===
22 October 2021
19:45

(1 BP) Northampton Saints	66 – 10	Worcester Warriors
Try: Biggar 9' m Mitchell (2) 15' c, 76' c Ratuniyarawa 22' c Skosan (3) 28' c, 45' c, 58' c Hutchinson 30' c Freeman (2) 52' m, 80' c Con: Biggar (7/8) 16', 23', 29', 31', 46', 77', 80+1'; Francis (1/1) 59'	Report	Try: Chudley 10' c Con: F. Smith (1/1) 12'; Pen: F. Smith (1/1) 19'

Franklin's Gardens
Attendance: 13,028
Referee: Ian Tempest

23 October 2021
15:00

Exeter Chiefs	21 – 33	London Irish (1 BP)
Try: Witty 23' c Hogg 26' c Nowell 68' c Con: J. Simmonds (3/3) 24', 27', 69'	Report	Try: Creevy 4' c Rona 10' c B. Janse van Rensburg 47' m Loader 60' c Hassell-Collins 64' c Con: Jackson (4/5) 5', 11', 61', 65'

Sandy Park
Attendance: 10,358
Referee: Hamish Smales

23 October 2021
15:00

Gloucester	29 – 20	Newcastle Falcons
Try: Rapava-Ruskin 34' c May 78' c Con: L. Evans (2/2) 35', 79'; Pen: L. Evans (5/5) 9', 20', 46', 72', 73'	Report	Try: Stevenson 49' c Nordli-Kelemeti 80+3' c Con: Hodgson (2/2) 49', 80+4'; Pen: Hodgson (2/2) 55', 61'

Kingsholm
Attendance: 10,429
Referee: Wayne Barnes

23 October 2021
15:00

(1 BP) Harlequins	31 – 17	Bath
Try: Esterhuizen (2) 4' c, 16' m M. Smith 48 'c Marchant (2) 74' c, 79' m Con: M. Smith (3/5) 5', 49', 75'	Report	Try: Underhill 26' c Stuart 32' c Con: Bailey (2/2) 27', 32'; Pen: Bailey (1/1) 8'

Twickenham Stoop
Attendance: 14,850
Referee: Luke Pearce

23 October 2021
15:00

Leicester Tigers	19 – 11	Sale Sharks
Try: Liebenberg 50' c Con: Ford (1/1) 52'; Pen: Ford (4/5) 32', 39', 57', 78'	Report	Try: Langdon 80+2' m Pen: Wilkinson (2/3) 37', 54'

Welford Road
Attendance: 19,096
Referee: Karl Dickson

24 October 2021
15:00

(1 BP) Saracens	56 – 15	Wasps
Try: George 13' c Malins (4) 21' c, 43' m, 61' m, 64' m B. Vunipola 39' c Lozowski 70' c Earl 80+3' c Con: Farrell (5/8) 14', 22', 40', 71', 80+3'; Pen: Farrell (2/2) 5', 11'	Report	Try: Gopperth 54' m Kibirige 56' c Con: Gopperth (1/2) 57'; Pen: Gopperth (1/1) 18'

StoneX Stadium
Attendance: 8,200
Referee: Matthew Carley

Bye/s: Bristol Bears

=== Round 7 ===
29 October 2021
19:45

(1 BP) Gloucester	13 – 16	Exeter Chiefs
Try: Singleton 15' c Con: Hastings (1/1) 16'; Pen: Hastings (2/2) 25', 28'	Report	Try: Hepburn 51' m Witty 67' m Pen: H. Skinner (2/4) 2', 7'

Kingsholm
Attendance: 13,042
Referee: Christophe Ridley

30 October 2021
15:00

Bath	17 – 27	Wasps
Try: de Glanville 28' c Rokoduguni 75' c Con: Bailey (1/1) 30'; Cipriani (1/1) 75'; Pen: Bailey (1/1) 20'	Report	Try: Fifita 8' c Oghre 48' c Shields 68' c Con: Gopperth (1/1) 10'; Umaga (2/2) 49', 69'; Pen: Gopperth (2/2) 26', 34'

Recreation Ground
Attendance: 13,636
Referee: Ian Tempest

30 October 2021
15:00

(1 BP) London Irish	33 – 45	Bristol Bears (1 BP)
Try: Stokes 21' m Willemse 39' c Rogerson 42' c Hepetema 69' c Rowe 78' c Con: Jackson (4/5) 40', 42', 70', 79'	Report	Try: Heenan 10' m Fricker 15' c Bates 17' c O'Conor 48' c Thacker 57' c Con: Sheedy (4/5) 16', 18', 49', 57'; Pen: Sheedy (4/4) 63', 66', 73', 80+2'

Brentford Community Stadium
Attendance: 7,573
Referee: Matthew Carley

30 October 2021
15:00

(1 BP) Northampton Saints	26 – 55	Leicester Tigers (1 BP)
Try: Skosan (2) 40+1' m, 78' c Mitchell 45' c A. Waller 57' c Con: J. Grayson (3/3) 45', 58', 79'	Report	Try: Nadolo (2) 12' m, 22' m van Wyk 20' c Montoya 34' c van Poortvliet (2) 66' c, 80' c Murimurivalu 71' m Con: Ford (4/7) 20', 34', 68', 80+1'; Pen: Ford (3/3) 3', 61', 64'; Drop: Ford (1/1) 55'

Franklin's Gardens
Attendance: 15,153
Referee: Tom Foley

30 October 2021
15:00

(1 BP) Worcester Warriors	27 – 14	Sale Sharks
Try: Shillcock (2) 7' c, 68' m D. van der Merwe (2) 9' c, 56' m Con: F. Smith (2/4) 7', 11'; Pen: F. Smith (1/1) 28'	Report	Try: Warr 20' c Langdon 63' c Con: R. du Preez (1/1) 21'; MacGinty (1/1) 64'

Sixways
Attendance: 6,182
Referee: Luke Pearce

31 October 2021
15:00

(1 BP) Harlequins	22 – 29	Saracens
Try: Tizard 3' m Murley 15' c Green 34' c Con: Allan (1/2) 16'; Edwards (1/1) 35'; Drop: Care (1/1) 56'	Report	Try: D. Morris 42' c Wray 77' c Con: Lozowski (2/2) 43', 78'; Pen: Lozowski (5/5) 5', 13', 29', 66', 71'

Twickenham Stoop
Attendance: 12,173
Referee: Craig Maxwell-Keys

Bye/s: Newcastle Falcons

=== Round 8 ===
5 November 2021
19:45

(1 BP) Leicester Tigers	40 – 23	Bath
Try: Dolly 11' c Scott 27' c Ford 57' c T. Cowan-Dickie 80+1' c Con: Ford (4/4) 12', 28', 59', 80+2'; Pen: Ford (4/4) 4', 25', 42', 75'	Report	Try: Clark 7' c McNally 52' c Con: Cipriani (2/2) 8', 53'; Pen: Cipriani (3/3) 22', 30', 63'

Welford Road
Attendance: 18,803
Referee: Matthew Carley

6 November 2021
15:00

(1 BP) Bristol Bears	27 – 5	Worcester Warriors
Try: Fricker (2) 36' m, 73' c Jeffries 39' m Whiteley 50' c Con: Sheedy (2/4) 51', 75'; Pen: Sheedy (1/1) 4'	Report	Try: Heward 49' m

Ashton Gate
Attendance: 15,873
Referee: Craig Maxwell-Keys

6 November 2021
15:00

(1 BP) Saracens	34 – 34	London Irish (1 BP)
Try: Woolstencroft 5' m Segun (2) 29' m, 46' c Earl 49' c Mak. Vunipola 61' c Con: Lozowski (3/5) 47', 50', 62'; Pen: Lozowski (1/1) 19'	Report	Try: Rowe (3) 54' m, 63' c, 80+6' c Phipps 68' c Rogerson 73' m Con: Jennings (3/5) 64', 69', 80+7'; Pen: Jackson (1/1) 15'

StoneX Stadium
Attendance: 7,200
Referee: Ian Tempest

6 November 2021
17:00

Sale Sharks	30 – 6	Northampton Saints
Try: A. van der Merwe 10' c Yarde 42' c Ross 80+2' c Con: MacGinty (3/3) 12', 43', 80+4'; Pen: MacGinty (3/3) 30', 34', 66'	Report	Pen: J. Grayson (2/4) 8', 40+1'

AJ Bell Stadium
Attendance: 3,697
Referee: Anthony Woodthorpe

6 November 2021
17:30

(1 BP) Exeter Chiefs	14 – 15	Newcastle Falcons
Try: J. Simmonds 40+1' c Armand 50' c Con: J. Simmonds (2/2) 40+2', 52'	Report	Try: McGuigan 9' c Stevenson 57' m Con: Hodgson (1/2) 10'; Pen: Connon (1/1) 73'

Sandy Park
Attendance: 9,376
Referee: Andrew Jackson

7 November 2021
16:30

Wasps	16 – 26	Harlequins (1 BP)
Try: Oghre 11' c Con: Umaga (1/1) 13'; Pen: Umaga (3/3) 7', 27', 37'	Report	Try: Green 42' m Northmore (2) 62' c, 80' c Steele 49' c Con: Esterhuizen (3/4) 62', 71', 80+1'

Coventry Building Society Arena
Attendance: 8,177
Referee: Wayne Barnes

Bye/s: Gloucester

=== Round 9 ===
26 November 2021
19:45

(1 BP) Bath	16 – 23	Exeter Chiefs
Try: M. Reid 20' c Con: Bailey (1/1) 22'; Pen: Bailey (3/3) 3', 48', 65'	Report	Try: Iosefa-Scott 43' c S. Simmonds 77' c Con: Slade (1/1) 44'; J. Simmonds (1/1) 78'; Pen: Slade (2/4) 9', 29'; J. Simmonds (1/1) 80+1'

Recreation Ground
Attendance: 14,461
Referee: Matthew Carley

26 November 2021
19:45

Bristol Bears	20 – 36	Northampton Saints (1 BP)
Try: Kerr 4' c Leiua 42' c Con: Sheedy (2/2) 5', 43'; Pen: Sheedy (2/2) 21', 31'	Report	Try: P. Hill 33' c Freeman (2) 36' c, 60' m Furbank 63' m Con: Biggar (2/4) 34', 37'; Pen: Biggar (4/4) 7', 18', 54', 75'

Ashton Gate
Attendance: 18,124
Referee: Karl Dickson

26 November 2021
19:45

(2 BP) Wasps	33 – 35	Gloucester (1 BP)
Try: Young 23' m Oghre 40' c Barbeary 56' c Umaga (2) 74' c, 78' c Con: Umaga (4/5) 40+1', 57', 75', 78'	Report	Try: May 11' c Twelvetrees (2) 28' c, 50' c Clement 66' m Con: Hastings (3/4) 12', 28', 51'; Pen: Hastings (3/3) 16', 21', 37'

Coventry Building Society Arena
Attendance: 7,236
Referee: Luke Pearce

27 November 2021
15:00

(1 BP) Harlequins	19 – 22	London Irish
Try: Beard (2) 22' c, 67' m Northmore 36' c Con: Allan (2/2) 24', 37'	Report	Try: Creevy 29' c Simmons 52' m B. White 58' c Con: Jackson (2/3) 30', 59'; Pen: Jackson (1/1) 5'

Twickenham Stoop
Attendance: 14,700
Referee: Christophe Ridley

27 November 2021
18:00

(1 BP) Newcastle Falcons	24 – 24	Worcester Warriors
Try: McGuigan (2) 20' m, 53' m Radwan 25' c Cooper 73' c Con: Hodgson (2/4) 26', 74'	Report	Try: Beck 40' c Hatherell 48' c Searle 75' c Con: F. Smith (3/3) 40+1', 49', 77'; Pen: F. Smith (1/1) 15'

Kingston Park
Attendance: 3,376
Referee: Wayne Barnes

28 November 2021
15:00

Saracens	25 – 14	Sale Sharks
Try: Koch 18' c Maitland 50' m Malins 72' c Con: Lozowski (2/3) 19', 73'; Pen: Lozowski (2/2) 4', 40+1'	Report	Try: B. Curry 63' c Quirke 74' c Con: MacGinty (2/2) 63', 75'

StoneX Stadium
Attendance: 8,200
Referee: Tom Foley

Bye/s: Leicester Tigers

=== Round 10 ===
3 December 2021
19:45

(1 BP) Gloucester	27 – 10	Bristol Bears
Try: Singleton 38' m C. Harris 56' c Penalty try 66'; Chapman 79' m Con: Hastings (1/3) 57'; Pen: Hastings (1/1) 6'	Report	Try: Purdy 44' c Con: Sheedy (1/1) 45'; Pen: Sheedy (1/3) 11'

Kingsholm
Attendance: 13,170
Referee: Christophe Ridley

4 December 2021
15:00

Exeter Chiefs	18 – 15	Saracens (1 BP)
Try: O'Flaherty 39' m L. Cowan-Dickie 57' c Con: J. Simmonds (1/2) 58'; Pen: J. Simmonds (2/3) 25', 64'	Report	Pen: Lozowski (5/5) 5', 29', 49', 68', 71'

Sandy Park
Attendance: 13,062
Referee: Luke Pearce

4 December 2021
15:00

(1 BP) London Irish	43 – 21	Newcastle Falcons
Try: Rowe 7' c Hassell-Collins (3) 10' c, 29' c, 52' m Mafi 33' c Creevy 65' c Con: Jackson (5/6) 8', 11', 30', 33', 66'; Pen: Jackson (1/1) 45'	Report	Try: Robinson 25' c Chick 37' c Radwan 79' c Con: Haydon-Wood (2/2) 26', 39'; Connon (1/1) 80'

Brentford Community Stadium
Attendance: 6,808
Referee: Craig Maxwell-Keys

4 December 2021
15:00

(1 BP) Northampton Saints	40 – 19	Bath
Try: Hutchinson 2' c Freeman 12' c Augustus (2) 24' c, 35' c Skosan (2) 51' m, 69' c Con: Biggar (4/5) 2', 13', 25', 36'; Furbank (1/1) 70'	Report	Try: Underhill 17' m Boyce 40' c Stuart 49' c Con: de Glanville (2/2) 41', 49'

Franklin's Gardens
Attendance: 13,100
Referee: Karl Dickson

4 December 2021
15:00

(1 BP) Worcester Warriors	32 – 31	Wasps (2 BP)
Try: G. Simpson 4' c D. van der Merwe 22' c T. Hill 38' m Chudley 43' c Con: F. Smith (3/4) 6', 23', 44'; Pen: F. Smith (2/2) 20', 31'	Report	Try: Fifita 17' c Frost (2) 26' c, 52' m Wolstenholme 65' c T. Willis 77' m Con: Gopperth (3/5) 17', 27', 66'

Sixways
Attendance: 6,910
Referee: Tom Foley

5 December 2021
15:00

Leicester Tigers	16 – 14	Harlequins (1 BP)
Try: Potter 43' c Con: Ford (1/1) 44'; Pen: Ford (3/4) 8', 25', 34'	Report	Try: Lynagh 63' m Pen: M. Smith (3/3) 13', 18', 56'

Welford Road
Attendance: 24,202
Referee: Ian Tempest

Bye/s: Sale Sharks

=== Round 11 ===
26 December 2021
14:00

(1 BP) Bristol Bears	26 – 28	Leicester Tigers
Try: Harding 22' c Lloyd 51' c Con: Sheedy (2/2) 23', 52'; Pen: Sheedy (4/6) 28', 35', 41', 72'	Report	Try: Nadolo 37' c Montoya 56' c G. Porter 80+3' m Con: Ford (2/3) 38', 57'; Pen: Ford (3/3) 14', 45', 61'

Ashton Gate
Attendance: 20,761
Referee: Tom Foley

26 December 2021
15:00

Newcastle Falcons	Cancelled; 0 – 0 (Note: Sale Sharks returned a number of positive COVID-19 tests and were therefore unable to field a side. Newcastle Falcons were awarded a win and 4 points, while Sale received 2 points.)	Sale Sharks

Kingston Park

26 December 2021
15:00

(1 BP) Saracens	61 – 29	Worcester Warriors (1 BP)
Try: Lewington (2) 5' m, 39' c B. Vunipola (2) 11' c, 52' c Goode 14' c Tompkins 21' c Isiekwe 29' c Earl 47' c Malins 61' c Con: Lozowski (8/9) 12', 15', 22', 30', 40', 48', 53', 63'	Report	Try: Batley 37' c Venter (2) 44' c, 70' m G. Simpson 74' m Beck 78' m Con: F. Smith (2/5) 36', 45'

StoneX Stadium
Attendance: 7,281
Referee: Christophe Ridley

26 December 2021
15:00

(1 BP) Wasps	38 – 30	London Irish (1 BP)
Try: Crossdale 7' c Frost (2) 17' c, 46' c Barbeary 31' m Con: Gopperth (3/4) 8', 18', 47'; Pen: Gopperth (4/5) 26', 36', 61', 69'	Report	Try: Hassell-Collins 21' m Creevy (2) 32' m, 40' m McElroy 63' m B. White 78' c Con: Jackson (1/5) 79'; Pen: Jackson (1/1) 4'

Coventry Building Society Arena
Attendance: 13,463
Referee: Craig Maxwell-Keys

26 December 2021
16:30

Bath	20 – 40	Gloucester (1 BP)
Try: B. Spencer 50' c Fox 80+1' c Con: Bailey (2/2) 51', 80+3'; Pen: Bailey (2/2) 3', 25'	Report	Try: Penalty try 21'; C. Harris (2) 27' m, 37' c Singleton 32' c Balmain 66' c Moyle 76' c Con: Hastings (4/5) 33', 38', 67', 77'

Recreation Ground
Attendance: 14,361
Referee: Matthew Carley

27 December 2021
17:00

(1 BP) Harlequins	41 – 27	Northampton Saints
Try: Dombrandt (3) 6' c, 40' m, 79' c Murley (2) 17' c, 30' c Lynagh 54' m Con: Edwards (3/5) 7', 18', 31'; Esterhuizen (1/1) 80'; Pen: Edwards (1/1) 72'	Report	Try: Augustus (2) 2' c, 9' c A. Waller 14' c Con: Biggar (3/3) 3', 10', 15'; Pen: Biggar (2/2) 33', 44'

Twickenham
Attendance: 72,735
Referee: Wayne Barnes

Bye/s: Exeter Chiefs

=== Round 12 ===
1 January 2022
14:00

(1 BP) Sale Sharks	26 – 18	Wasps
Try: J-L. du Preez 12' c Yarde 16' c R. Janse van Rensburg 28' m B. Curry 43' c Con: MacGinty (3/4) 13', 30', 44'	Report	Try: Bassett 3' m Gopperth 80' c Con: Gopperth (1/2) 80'; Pen: Gopperth (2/3) 16', 48'

AJ Bell Stadium
Attendance: 6,226
Referee: Ian Tempest

1 January 2022
16:30

Exeter Chiefs	19 – 13	Bristol Bears (1 BP)
Try: O'Flaherty 12' c J. Hill 30' m Hogg 74' c Con: J. Simmonds (2/3) 13', 76'	Report	Try: Purdy 70' c Con: Sheedy (1/1) 71'; Pen: Sheedy (2/3) 18', 79'

Sandy Park
Attendance: 14,100
Referee: Luke Pearce

2 January 2022
15:00

(1 BP) Gloucester	17 – 20	Harlequins
Try: Ackermann 23' c Socino 78' c Con: Hastings (1/1) 24'; L. Evans (1/1) 79'; Pen: Hastings (1/1) 20'	Report	Try: Northmore 34' c Care 64' c Con: M. Smith (2/2) 36', 65'; Pen: M. Smith (2/3) 32', 67'

Kingsholm
Attendance: 16,115
Referee: Tom Foley

2 January 2022
15:00

(1 BP) Leicester Tigers	31 – 0	Newcastle Falcons
Try: Kelly 31' c Scott 38' c Martin 54' c Potter 80' c Con: Ford (3/3) 32', 39', 55'; Burns (1/1) 80+1'; Pen: Ford (1/1) 2'	Report

Welford Road
Attendance: 22,515
Referee: Jack Makepeace

2 January 2022
15:00

Northampton Saints	6 – 30	Saracens
Pen: Biggar (2/2) 7', 36'	Report	Try: Lozowski 43' c Woolstencroft 72' c Itoje 76' c Con: Lozowski (3/3) 44', 73', 77'; Pen: Lozowski (3/4) 5', 24', 58'

Franklin's Gardens
Attendance: 14,734
Referee: Adam Leal

3 January 2022
15:00

London Irish	Cancelled; 0 – 0 (Note: Bath returned a number of positive COVID-19 tests and were therefore unable to field a side. London Irish were awarded a win and 4 points, while Bath received 2 points.)	Bath

Brentford Community Stadium

Bye/s: Worcester Warriors

=== Round 13 ===
7 January 2022
19:45

(1 BP) Bristol Bears	32 – 15	Sale Sharks
Try: Capon 9' c Morahan (2) 18' m, 31' c Uren 80' c Con: Sheedy (3/4) 9', 32', 80+1'; Pen: Sheedy 43', 56'	Report	Try: Ashman 3' m R. du Preez 27' c Con: MacGinty (1/2) 28'; Pen: MacGinty 34'

Ashton Gate
Attendance: 16,186
Referee: Wayne Barnes

8 January 2022
15:00

Harlequins	14 – 12	Exeter Chiefs (1 BP)
Try: Northmore 3' c Esterhuizen 78' c Con: M. Smith (2/2) 4', 79'	Report	Try: Slade 33' c Innard 65' m Con: J. Simmonds (1/2) 34'

Twickenham Stoop
Attendance: 11,835
Referee: Ian Tempest

8 January 2022
15:00

Newcastle Falcons	8 – 44	Northampton Saints (1 BP)
Try: McGuigan 53' m Pen: Hodgson (1/1) 13'	Report	Try: Collins 22' c Skosan 29' c S. Matavesi 58' c Furbank 61' c James 76' c Con: Biggar (4/4) 23', 30', 59', 62'; Furbank (1/1) 78'; Pen: Biggar (2/2) 26', 30'

Kingston Park
Attendance: 5,213
Referee: Matthew Carley

8 January 2022
15:00

(2 BP) Saracens	24 – 25	Gloucester
Try: D. Morris 20' c Segun 28' c McFarland 52' m Lewington 76' m Con: Lozowski (2/4) 21', 29'	Report	Try: Balmain 14' m Singleton 29' c Clement 72' c Con: Hastings (2/3) 31', 73'; Pen: Hastings (2/2) 51', 75'

StoneX Stadium
Attendance: 7,031
Referee: Karl Dickson

9 January 2022
15:00

Bath	22 – 19	Worcester Warriors (1 BP)
Try: Rokoduguni 7' c Ojomoh 21' c de Glanville 54' m Con: Bailey (2/3) 8', 24'; Pen: Bailey (1/1) 69'	Report	Try: Shillcock 11' m Batley 32' c G. Simpson 37' c Con: F. Smith (2/3) 33', 38'

Recreation Ground
Attendance: 12,485
Referee: Craig Maxwell-Keys

9 January 2022
15:00

Wasps	16 – 13	Leicester Tigers (1 BP)
Try: Penalty try 3'; Pen: Gopperth (3/4) 54', 57', 68'	Report	Try: Montoya 31' c Con: Ford (1/1) 31'; Pen: Ford (2/4) 7', 12'

Coventry Building Society Arena
Attendance: 14,234
Referee: Tom Foley

Bye/s: London Irish

=== Round 14 ===
28 January 2022
19:45

Bath	21 – 17	Harlequins (1 BP)
Try: Muir (2) 43' c, 57' m Con: B. Spencer (1/2) 44'; Pen: B. Spencer (3/3) 26', 30', 78'	Report	Try: Lamb 11' c Murley 40' m Hammond 73' m Con: Allan (1/3) 12'

Recreation Ground
Attendance: 14,500
Referee: Tom Foley

29 January 2022
15:00

London Irish	18 – 14	Exeter Chiefs (1 BP)
Try: Cornish 22' m Stokes 40+1' c Con: Jackson (1/1) 40+3'; Pen: Jackson (2/4) 29', 31'	Report	Try: Woodburn 5' c Schickerling 18' c Con: J. Simmonds (2/2) 6', 18'

Brentford Community Stadium
Attendance: 11,555
Referee: Matthew Carley

29 January 2022
15:00

Worcester Warriors	13 – 29	Northampton Saints (1 BP)
Try: Sutherland 61' m Beck 65' m Pen: F. Smith (1/1) 25'	Report	Try: Hutchinson 22' c S. Matavesi 29' m Mitchell 38' c Fish 70' c Con: Biggar (3/4) 22, 39', 70'; Pen: Biggar (1/1) 47'

Sixways
Attendance: 6,876
Referee: Ian Tempest

29 January 2022
19:00

Newcastle Falcons	22 – 32	Gloucester (1 BP)
Try: Radwan 9' m M. Carreras 52' c Maddison 79' c Con: Connon (1/2) 53'; Haydon-Wood (1/1) 79'; Pen: Connon (1/2)	Report	Try: Rapava-Ruskin 7' m S. Carreras 12' c Ludlow 32' m Thorley 58' m Rees-Zammit 62' c Con: Hastings (1/3) 13'; L. Evans (1/2) 63'; Pen: Hastings (1/2) 4'

Kingston Park
Attendance: 4,562
Referee: Jack Makepeace

30 January 2022
15:00

(1 BP) Sale Sharks	35 – 26	Leicester Tigers
Try: James 17' m Curry 51' c Reed 58' m D. du Preez 64' c Roebuck 76' m Con: MacGinty (2/5) 52', 65'; Pen: MacGinty (2/2) 74', 76'	Report	Try: Montoya (2) 14' c, 69' m G. Porter 22' m Con: Burns (1/3) 15'; Pen: Burns (3/3) 4', 35', 49'

AJ Bell Stadium
Attendance: 9,171
Referee: Craig Maxwell-Keys

30 January 2022
15:00

Wasps	26 – 20	Saracens (1 BP)
Try: Spink 6' c Stooke 75' c Con: Gopperth (2/2) 7', 76'; Pen: Gopperth (4/5) 4', 22', 48', 55'	Report	Try: Lewington 30' m Woolstencroft 39' m Tompkins 79' c Con: Lozowski (1/3) 80'; Pen: Lozowski (1/1) 19'

Coventry Building Society Arena
Attendance: 10,390
Referee: Karl Dickson

Bye/s: Bristol Bears

=== Round 15 ===
4 February 2022
19:45

Gloucester	24 – 7	London Irish
Try: Ackermann (2) 14' c, 79' c Thorley 47' c Con: L. Evans (2/2) 16', 48'; Hastings (1/1) 80'; Pen: Hastings (1/1) 74'	Report	Try: Cracknell 53' c Con: Jackson (1/1) 54'

Kingsholm
Attendance: 13,412
Referee: Karl Dickson

5 February 2022
14:00

(1 BP) Bristol Bears	37 – 21	Newcastle Falcons
Try: Uren 4' c Naulago 11' c Morahan 20' c Leiua 26' c Con: Whiteley (4/4) 5', 12', 21', 27'; Pen: Whiteley (3/3) 45', 63', 78'	Report	Try: Nordli-Kelemeti 22' c Penalty try 40'; Earle 55' c Con: Haydon-Wood (2/2) 23', 57'

Ashton Gate
Attendance: 15,503
Referee: Matthew Carley

5 February 2022
14:30

(2 BP) Exeter Chiefs	26 – 27	Wasps (1 BP)
Try: O'Flaherty 15' c L. Pearson 26' c Innard 36' c Capstick 43' m Con: J. Simmonds (3/4) 16', 27', 38'	Report	Try: Odogwu (2) 5' c, 80+6' m Launchbury 49' c Barbeary 78' c Con: Gopperth (2/4) 50', 79'; Pen: Gopperth (1/1) 25'

Sandy Park
Attendance: 13,094
Referee: Wayne Barnes

5 February 2022
15:00

(1 BP) Leicester Tigers	36 – 16	Worcester Warriors
Try: Saumaki 9' m Burns 27' c Penalty try 33'; Liebenberg 51' c Reffell 76' c Con: Burns (3/4) 28', 52', 77'; Pen: Burns (1/1) 23'	Report	Try: Hearle 59' c Con: Searle (1/1) 60' c Pen: Searle (3/3) 19', 37', 47'

Welford Road
Attendance: 18,403
Referee: Luke Pearce

5 February 2022
15:00

(1 BP) Saracens	40 – 3	Bath
Try: Woolstencroft (2) 37' m, 40+1' c Goode 46' m Lewington 59' c McFarland 67' c Con: Lozowski (3/5) 40+3', 60', 68'; Pen: Lozowski (3/3) 6', 21', 44'	Report	Pen: B. Spencer (1/1) 23'

StoneX Stadium
Attendance: 8,487
Referee: Sara Cox

6 February 2022
13:00

Harlequins	14 – 36	Sale Sharks (1 BP)
Try: Tizard 40+1' c Allan 63' c Con: Allan (2/2) 40+2', 63'	Report	Try: Roebuck (2) 15' c, 21' c Ashman 30' m R. du Preez (2) 48' c, 75' c Con: MacGinty (4/5) 16', 22', 49', 76'; Pen: MacGinty (1/2) 8'

Twickenham Stoop
Attendance: 14,257
Referee: Ian Tempest

Bye/s: Northampton Saints

=== Round 16 ===
11 February 2022
19:45

(1 BP) Bristol Bears	32 – 49	London Irish (1 BP)
Try: Whiteley 16' m Naulago 32' c Strang 76' m Challenger 78' m Kerr 80+1' c Con: Whiteley (1/2) 33'; Eden (1/3) 80+2'; Pen: Whiteley (1/1) 2'	Report	Try: Phipps (2) 25' c, 56' c B. Janse van Rensburg 53' c Loader 62' m Jackson 66' c T. Pearson 75' c Con: Jackson (5/6) 26', 54', 57', 67', 76'; Pen: Jackson (3/3) 7', 42', 70'

Ashton Gate
Attendance: 16,637
Referee: Christophe Ridley

11 February 2022
19:45

(1 BP) Leicester Tigers	35 – 20	Northampton Saints
Try: Nadolo (2) 14' c, 23' c Montoya 32' m Hegarty 59' c Con: Burns (3/4) 15', 24', 60'; Pen: Burns (3/4) 18', 43', 64'	Report	Try: Mitchell 7' m Skosan 34' m Wilkins 70' c Con: Furbank (1/3) 71'; Pen: Furbank (1/1) 48'

Welford Road
Attendance: 23,100
Referee: Matthew Carley

12 February 2022
15:00

(1 BP) Exeter Chiefs	24 – 15	Gloucester
Try: Innard 26' m Schickerling 49' c Woodburn 54' m O'Flaherty 63' c Con: J. Simmonds (2/4) 50', 64'	Report	Try: Clarke 7' m S. Carreras 67' m Chapman 72' m

Sandy Park
Attendance: 12,984
Referee: Tom Foley

12 February 2022
15:00

(1 BP) Sale Sharks	36 – 12	Worcester Warriors
Try: S. James 3' m Reed (2) 21' m, 58' c Tuilagi 46' c Langdon 54' m R. Janse van Rensburg 68' c Con: MacGinty (3/5) 47', 59', 69'	Report	Try: Howe 15' c Annett 27' m Con: F. Smith (1/2) 16'

AJ Bell Stadium
Attendance: 4,632
Referee: Karl Dickson

12 February 2022
15:00

(1 BP) Wasps	41 – 24	Bath
Try: Miller 2' m Alo 21' c Stooke 37' m Odogwu (2) 70' c, 72' m Barbeary (2) 75' m, 80+1' c Con: Gopperth (3/7) 22', 71', 80+2'	Report	Try: Prydie 17' c Faletau 32' c B. Spencer 48' c Con: Bailey (3/3) 18', 33', 49'; Pen: Bailey 62'

Coventry Building Society Arena
Attendance: Anthony Woodthorpe
Referee: 9,139

13 February 2022
13:00

Saracens	19 – 10	Harlequins
Try: Woolstencroft 6' m Maitland 24' m Pen: Lozowski (3/3) 49', 59', 79'	Report	Try: Care 18' c Con: Allan (1/1) 19'; Pen: Allan (1/1) 38'

StoneX Stadium
Attendance: 8,365
Referee: Luke Pearce

Bye/s: Newcastle Falcons

=== Round 17 ===
18 February 2022
19:45

Worcester Warriors	19 – 14	Bristol Bears (1 BP)
Try: D. van der Merwe 4' c Beck 18' c Vailanu 44' m Con: F. Smith (2/3) 5', 19'	Report	Try: Luatua 25' c Lahiff 28' c Con: Sheedy (2/2) 25', 29'

Sixways
Attendance: 6,213
Referee: Wayne Barnes

19 February 2022
15:00

(1 BP) Bath	20 – 24	Leicester Tigers
Try: Muir 8' m Ojomoh 28' c Bayliss 30' m Con: Bailey (1/3) 28'; Pen: Bailey (1/1) 21'	Report	Try: J. Wiese 5' c Wigglesworth 11' c Burns 53' c Con: Burns (3/3) 6', 11', 54'; Pen: Hegarty (1/1) 59'

Recreation Ground
Attendance: 14,100
Referee: Karl Dickson

19 February 2022
15:00

(1 BP) Harlequins	29 – 24	Wasps (1 BP)
Try: Beard 2' m Jones 30' c Murley 43' c Esterhuizen 45' m Lynagh 63' m Con: Edwards (2/4) 31', 44'	Report	Try: T. Willis 58' c Spink 73' c Toomaga-Allen 80+1' c Con: Umaga (3/3) 59', 74', 80+2'; Pen: Umaga (1/2) 6'

Twickenham Stoop
Attendance: 14,000
Referee: Craig Maxwell-Keys

19 February 2022
15:00

(1 BP) London Irish	32 – 30	Saracens (1 BP)
Try: B. Janse van Rensburg (2) 2' m, 23' c Coleman 41' c Hassell-Collins 63' c Con: Jackson (3/4) 24', 41', 64'; Pen: Jackson (2/2) 57', 80+1'	Report	Try: Woolstencroft 35' c Segun 60' c Tompkins 76' c Con: Lozowski (3/3) 36', 61', 77'; Pen: Lozowski (3/4) 11', 53', 72'

Brentford Community Stadium
Attendance: 8,523
Referee: Hamish Smales

19 February 2022
15:00

(1 BP) Northampton Saints	21 – 22	Sale Sharks
Try: Augustus 6' c Coles 36' c Mitchell 42' c Con: Furbank (3/3) 7', 37', 44'	Report	Try: Reed 3' c S. James 14' m R. Janse van Rensburg 58' c Con: MacGinty (2/3) 5', 59'; Pen: MacGinty (1/1) 2'

Franklin's Gardens
Attendance: 13,057
Referee: Tom Foley

20 February 2022
15:00

(1 BP) Newcastle Falcons	14 – 15	Exeter Chiefs
Try: Haydon-Wood 22' c McGuigan 55' c Con: Haydon-Wood (2/2) 24', 56'	Report	Try: Schickerling 36' c Innard 43' m Con: J. Simmonds (1/2) 37'; Pen: J. Simmonds (1/1) 76'

Kingston Park
Attendance: 6,205
Referee: Christophe Ridley

Bye/s: Gloucester

=== Round 18 ===
25 February 2022
19:45

(1 BP) Bristol Bears	31 – 19	Wasps
Try: Thacker 13' c Frisch 22' c Adeolokun 27' c Leiua 42' c Con: Eden (4/4) 14', 23', 28', 44'; Pen: Eden (1/2) 77'	Report	Try: Oghre 38' c W. Porter 54' m Watson 73' c Con: Umaga (2/3) 38', 74'

Ashton Gate
Attendance: 16,296
Referee: Matthew Carley

25 February 2022
19:45

(1 BP) Sale Sharks	27 – 27	London Irish (1 BP)
Try: D. du Preez (2) 37' m, 54' c J-L. du Preez 43' c Reed 59' m Con: MacGinty (2/4) 44', 56'; Pen: MacGinty (1/1) 40'	Report	Try: Hepetema 32' c Stokes 50' m B. Janse van Rensburg 57' c Phipps 75' m Con: Jackson (2/4) 33', 58'; Pen: Jackson (1/3) 41'

AJ Bell Stadium
Attendance: 4,691
Referee: Andrew Jackson

25 February 2022
19:45

Worcester Warriors	21 – 29	Harlequins (1 BP)
Try: Heward 17' c Vailanu 40' c S. Atkinson 79' c Con: F. Smith (2/2) 18', 40+1'; Searle (1/1) 79'	Report	Try: Green 23' c Care 34' c A. White 50' m Lawday 75' c Con: Edwards (2/3) 24', 35'; Allan (1/1) 76'; Pen: Allan (1/1) 67'

Sixways
Attendance: 6,154
Referee: Christophe Ridley

26 February 2022
15:00

(1 BP) Leicester Tigers	35 – 23	Gloucester Rugby
Try: van Poortvliet 14' c J. Wiese 20' c Liebenberg 50' c G. Porter 71' m Con: Burns (3/4) 15', 21', 51'; Pen: Burns (3/4) 53', 64', 76'	Report	Try: Thorley 29' c Elrington 74' c Con: Hastings (2/2) 29', 74'; Pen: Hastings (3/4) 5', 17', 40+2'

Welford Road
Attendance: 20,212
Referee: Jack Makepeace

26 February 2022
15:00

(1 BP) Newcastle Falcons	25 – 30	Bath (1 BP)
Try: McGuigan 4' m Collett 28' c Peterson 60' c Con: Haydon-Wood (2/3) 29', 62'; Pen: Haydon-Wood (2/2) 16', 38'	Report	Try: Richards 21' m Boyce 50' c J. Cokanasiga (2) 64' m, 76' c Con: Cipriani (2/4) 51', 77'; Pen: Cipriani (2/2) 12', 40'

Kingston Park
Attendance: 6,213
Referee: Adam Leal

27 February 2022
13:00

(1 BP) Northampton Saints	31 – 34	Exeter Chiefs (1 BP)
Try: Proctor 28' c Collins 41' c Augustus 47' m Con: J. Grayson (2/3) 30', 41'; Pen: J. Grayson (3/3) 7', 18', 44'; Francis (1/1) 73'	Report	Try: Hodge 22' c Ewers 32' c Yeandle 64' c Woodburn 69' c Con: J. Simmonds (4/4) 23', 33', 65', 70'; Pen: J. Simmonds (2/2) 10', 79'

Franklin's Gardens
Attendance: 12,824
Referee: George Selwood

Bye/s: Saracens

=== Round 19 ===
4 March 2022
19:45

(1 BP) Harlequins	24 – 10	Newcastle Falcons
Try: Jones 4' c Murley (2) 27' m, 67' m Lynagh 31' c Con: Allan (2/3) 5', 32'	Report	Try: Marshall 38' c Con: Haydon-Wood (1/1) 39'; Pen: Haydon-Wood (1/1) 24'

Twickenham Stoop
Attendance: 11,007
Referee: Karl Dickson

5 March 2022
15:00

(1 BP) Bath	29 – 27	Bristol Bears (1 BP)
Try: Rokoduguni 36' m J. Joseph 43' c Faletau 46' c J. Cokanasiga 71' m de Glanville 80+4' m Con: Cipriani (2/5) 44', 46'	Report	Try: Thacker (2) 2' c, 5' c Naulago 13' c Con: Sheedy (3/3) 3', 6', 14'; Pen: Sheedy (2/2) 40+1', 75'

Recreation Ground
Attendance: 14,509
Referee: Luke Pearce

5 March 2022
15:00

(1 BP) Gloucester	35 – 30	Northampton Saints (1 BP)
Try: Elrington 2' c Seabrook 36' c Rees-Zammit 62' c Penalty try 66' c Craig 73' c Con: Hastings (4/4) 3', 37', 63', 74'	Report	Try: Proctor 26' c Dingwall 34' c Collins 50' c Con: Biggar (3/3) 26', 35', 51'; Pen: Biggar (3/4) 20', 32', 70'

Kingsholm
Attendance: 12,127
Referee: Ian Tempest

5 March 2022
15:00

(1 BP) London Irish	43 – 12	Worcester Warriors
Try: Creevy (2) 9' m, 41' c Cinti 26' m González 37' c Rona 48' c Jackson 56' c B. White 71' m Con: Jackson (4/6) 38', 42', 49', 56'	Report	Try: Heward (2) 40+1' m, 74' c Con: F. Smith (1/1) 75'

Brentford Community Stadium
Attendance: 6,966
Referee: Jack Makepeace

5 March 2022
15:00

(1 BP) Saracens	34 – 27	Leicester Tigers (1 BP)
Try: Woolstencroft (2) 20' c, 77' m Lewington 29' c Maitland 36' m Koch 42' c Con: Lozowski (3/5) 22', 30', 43'; Pen: Lozowski (1/1) 31'	Report	Try: Snyman 7' c Dolly 48' c Chessum 72' c Con: Ford (3/3) 8', 49', 73'; Pen: Ford (2/3) 26', 35'

StoneX Stadium
Attendance: 8,700
Referee: Craig Maxwell-Keys

6 March 2022
15:00

Exeter Chiefs	19 – 12	Sale Sharks (1 BP)
Try: Woodburn 4' c Vermeulen (2) 15' m, 37' m Con: J. Simmonds (2/3) 5', 38'	Report	Try: Ashman 51' c Langdon 80+2' m Con: MacGinty (1/2) 53'

Sandy Park
Attendance: 10,396
Referee: Wayne Barnes

Bye/s: Wasps

=== Round 20 ===
12 March 2022
14:30

(1 BP) Worcester Warriors	35 – 31	Exeter Chiefs (2 BP)
Try: Hearle (3) 16' c, 34' c, 68' c Heward 45' c Doel 64' c Con: F. Smith (5/5) 17', 35', 46', 65', 69'	Report	Try: Grondona 26' c O'Flaherty 31' c Innard 62' m Norey 71' c Ewers 76' m Con: J. Simmonds (3/5) 27', 33', 72'

Sixways
Attendance: 8,570
Referee: Anthony Woodthorpe

12 March 2022
15:00

(1 BP) Leicester Tigers	47 – 28	London Irish
Try: Nadolo (2) 8' c, 56' c Scott 19' m Potter 33' c Penalty try 38'; Reffell 53' c Ashton 71' c Con: Burns (5/6) 9', 34', 54', 58', 72'	Report	Try: B. Janse van Rensburg 2' c Arundell 41' m Cornish 74' c Con: Jackson (2/3) 3', 75'; Pen: Jackson (3/3) 17', 23', 31'

Welford Road
Attendance: 19,103
Referee: Karl Dickson

12 March 2022
15:00

Newcastle Falcons	21 – 36	Saracens (1 BP)
Try: McGuigan (2) 4' c, 53' m Con: Haydon-Wood (1/2) 5'; Pen: Haydon-Wood (3/3) 19', 22', 27'	Report	Try: Woolstencroft 15' c Penalty try 26'; Obatoyinbo 43' c Segun 73' m Goode 78' c Con: Goode (3/4) 16', 44', 79'; Pen: Goode (1/1) 33'

Kingston Park
Attendance: 7,685
Referee: Ian Tempest

12 March 2022
15:00

(1 BP) Sale Sharks	26 – 24	Gloucester (2 BP)
Try: de Klerk 4' m MacGinty 25' c J-P. du Preez 38' c J-L. du Preez 44' c Con: de Klerk (3/4) 26', 39', 45'	Report	Try: Socino (2) 16' c, 29' m Chapman 61' m Hillman-Cooper 68' c Con: Barton (2/4) 17', 69'

AJ Bell Stadium
Attendance: 5,000
Referee: Christophe Ridley

13 March 2022
15:00

(1 BP) Bristol Bears	29 – 38	Harlequins (1 BP)
Try: Luatua 9' c Jeffries 12' m Attwood 20' c Byrne 48' c Con: Sheedy (3/4) 10', 21', 49'; Pen: Sheedy (1/1) 54'	Report	Try: Murley (2) 2' c, 4' c Lawday 18' m Tizard 30' c Walker 67' m Northmore 73' c Con: Edwards (4/6) 3', 5', 31', 74'

Ashton Gate
Attendance: 17,446
Referee: Craig Maxwell-Keys

13 March 2022
15:00

(1 BP) Northampton Saints	27 – 22	Wasps (1 BP)
Try: Mitchell 12' m J. Grayson 26' c A. Waller 47' c Skosan 72' m Con: J. Grayson (2/4) 27', 48'; Pen: J. Grayson (1/3) 69'	Report	Try: Umaga 5' c Odogwu 63' m W. Porter 74' c Con: Gopperth (1/2) 6'; Umaga (1/1) 75'; Pen: Gopperth (1/1) 10'

Franklin's Gardens
Attendance: 14,693
Referee: Wayne Barnes

Bye/s: Bath

=== Round 21 ===
25 March 2022
19:45

(1 BP) Gloucester	Cancelled; 20 – 0 (Note: Due to a combination of illness and injuries, Worcester Warriors were unable to field a side and therefore had to forfeit the match. Gloucester were awarded a win and 5 points.)	Worcester Warriors

Kingsholm

26 March 2022
15:00

Bath	24 – 24	Sale Sharks (1 BP)
Try: Underhill (2) 21' c, 26' c de Glanville 39' c Con: Cipriani (3/3) 22', 27', 40'; Pen: Cipriani (1/1) 77'	Report	Try: L. James 9' c J-L. du Preez 52' m R. Janse van Rensburg 58' m Ashman 65' c Con: R. du Preez (1/2) 10' de Klerk (1/2) 66'

Recreation Ground
Attendance: 13,891
Referee: Hamish Smales

26 March 2022
15:00

London Irish	22 – 42	Northampton Saints (1 BP)
Try: Hassell-Collins 5' m Phipps (2) 74' c, 79' c Con: Jackson (2/3) 75', 80'; Pen: Jackson (1/1) 10'	Report	Try: Collins (2) 23' c, 61' c Hutchinson 25' c Penalty try 44'; Mitchell 49' c Dingwall 53' c Con: Biggar (4/4) 24', 26', 50', 54'; Hutchinson (1/1) 62'

Brentford Community Stadium
Attendance: 15,085
Referee: Wayne Barnes

26 March 2022
15:00

Wasps	27 – 24	Newcastle Falcons (1 BP)
Try: Robson 24' c Launchbury 40' c West 63' c Con: Gopperth (3/3) 25', 40+1', 64'; Pen: Gopperth (2/2) 52', 76'	Report	Try: McGuigan (3) 21' c, 36' c, 61' c Con: Haydon-Wood (3/3) 22', 37', 62'; Pen: Haydon-Wood (1/2) 13'

Coventry Building Society Arena
Attendance: 9,077
Referee: Andrew Jackson

26 March 2022
15:00

Saracens	27 – 23	Bristol Bears (1 BP)
Try: Malins (2) 11' c, 45' c Daly 39' c Con: Farrell (3/3) 12', 40', 46'; Pen: Farrell (2/2) 27', 30'	Report	Try: Frisch 3' c O'Conor 24' m Eden 37' m Con: Eden (1/3) 4'; Pen: Eden (1/1) 33'; Sheedy (1/1) 62'

Tottenham Hotspur Stadium
Attendance: 49,376
Referee: Christophe Ridley

27 March 2022
15:00

(1 BP) Exeter Chiefs	17 – 22	Leicester Tigers
Try: Ewers 54' c Schickerling 71' c Con: J. Simmonds (2/2) 55', 72'; Pen: J. Simmonds (1/1) 75'	Report	Try: Ashton (2) 7' m, 45' c Steward 31' c Con: Kelly (1/1) 31'; Burns (1/1) 46'; Pen: Burns (1/1) 62'

Sandy Park
Attendance: 12,022
Referee: Luke Pearce

Bye/s: Harlequins

=== Round 22 ===
1 April 2022
19:45

(1 BP) Sale Sharks	12 – 18	Saracens
Pen: R. du Preez (4/4) 10', 21', 64', 80+1'	Report	Try: Earl (2) 37' m, 71' c Con: Goode (1/1) 73'; Pen: Lozowski (2/4) 44', 56'

AJ Bell Stadium
Attendance: 6,837
Referee: Luke Pearce

2 April 2022
15:00

(1 BP) Exeter Chiefs	42 – 22	Bath
Try: Vermeulen 14' c Ewers 38' c Schickerling 40+1' c Keast 64' c Hogg 73' c Grondona 78' c Con: J. Simmonds (4/4) 15', 65', 74', 79'; Hogg (2/2) 39', 40+3'	Report	Try: J. Cokanasiga (2) 12' c, 33' c Bayliss 20' m Con: Bailey (2/3) 13', 34'; Pen: Bailey (1/1) 27'

Sandy Park
Attendance: 12,651
Referee: Wayne Barnes

2 April 2022
15:00

(1 BP) Gloucester	21 – 27	Wasps
Try: Moyle 54' m Penalty try 73'; Pen: Hastings (3/3) 15', 36', 59'	Report	Try: Umaga 42' c Oghre 53' c C. Atkinson 67' c Con: Gopperth (3/3) 43', 53', 68'; Pen: Gopperth (1/1) 80+1'; Drop: Robson (1/1) 74'

Kingsholm
Attendance: 11,628
Referee: Matthew Carley

2 April 2022
15:00

(1 BP) Northampton Saints	39 – 22	Bristol Bears (1 BP)
Try: Collins (2) 25' c, 61' m Hutchinson 28' c Ludlam 35' c Freeman 55' c Con: Biggar (4/5) 26', 29', 36', 56'; Pen: Biggar (2/2) 15', 51'	Report	Try: Radradra 7' m Sheedy 33' m Y. Thomas 38' c Leiua 73' m Con: Sheedy (1/3) 39'

Franklin's Gardens
Attendance: 12,923
Referee: Karl Dickson

2 April 2022
15:00

Worcester Warriors	10 – 45	Newcastle Falcons (1 BP)
Try: Humphreys 22' m T. Hill 70' m	Report	Try: McGuigan 4' c Connon 31' c Radwan 40' c Schreuder 52' c Davison 66' c Blamire 78' c Con: Connon (6/6) 5', 32', 40+2', 53', 67', 80'; Pen: Connon (1/1) 44'

Sixways
Attendance: 7,588
Referee: Adam Leal

3 April 2022
15:00

London Irish	14 – 41	Harlequins (1 BP)
Try: Jackson 14' c B. Janse van Rensburg 73' c Con: Jackson (2/2) 15', 74'	Report	Try: Walker (2) 18' c, 40' m Murley 32' m Jones (2) 37' m, 78' m Care 46' c Esterhuizen 68' c Con: M. Smith (2/5) 19', 47'; Edwards (1/2) 68'

Brentford Community Stadium
Attendance: 13,083
Referee: Mathieu Raynal

Bye/s: Leicester Tigers

=== Round 23 ===
22 April 2022
19:45

(1 BP) Bristol Bears	29 – 28	Gloucester (2 BP)
Try: Thacker 3' c Uren 7' c Fricker (2) 68' c, 79' m Con: Sheedy (3/4) 4', 8', 69'; Pen: Sheedy (1/1) 11'	Report	Try: Chapman 15' c Rees-Zammit 24' c C. Harris 28' c Singleton 74' c Con: Hastings (4/4) 16', 25', 29', 75'

Ashton Gate
Attendance: 16,592
Referee: Ian Tempest

22 April 2022
19:45

Newcastle Falcons	14 – 42	London Irish (1 BP)
Try: Robinson 19' c Stevenson 40+3' c Con: Hodgson (2/2) 20', 40+4'	Report	Try: Rowe 16' c Tuisue 24' c Creevy 29' c Hassell-Collins 38' c Rona 62' c Cornish 73' c Con: Jackson (6/6) 17', 25', 30', 39', 62', 74'

Kingston Park
Attendance: 4,780
Referee: Karl Dickson

23 April 2022
15:00

(2 BP) Bath	31 – 36	Northampton Saints (1 BP)
Try: Clark 24' c Muir 31' c B. Spencer (2) 56' c, 59' c Con: Cipriani (2/2) 25', 32'; B. Spencer (2/2) 57', 60'; Pen: Cipriani (1/1) 40+1'	Report	Try: Proctor 17' c Augustus 45' m Mitchell 65' m Freeman 70' c Penalty try 76'; Haywood 80+1' m Con: Furbank (1/2) 18'; Grayson (1/3) 71'

Recreation Ground
Attendance: 13,845
Referee: Luke Pearce

23 April 2022
15:00

Harlequins	26 – 20	Leicester Tigers (1 BP)
Try: Collier 4' c Murley 12' m Esterhuizen 75' m Con: M. Smith (1/3) 5'; Pen: M. Smith (3/3) 34', 66', 80+1'	Report	Try: Nadolo 8' c Liebenberg 28' m J. Wiese 57' m Con: Ford (1/3) 8'; Pen: Burns (1/1) 73'

Twickenham Stoop
Attendance: 12,619
Referee: Wayne Barnes

23 April 2022
15:00

(1 BP) Wasps	41 – 12	Worcester Warriors
Try: West 4' c Bassett 31' m Stooke 53' c Oghre (2) 64' c, 78' m T. Willis 80+3' c Con: Gopperth (2/3) 5', 55'; Umaga (2/3) 65', 80+3'; Pen: Gopperth (1/1) 28'	Report	Try: Doel 48' c T. Hill 70' m Con: Searle (1/1) 49'

Coventry Building Society Arena
Attendance: 9,824
Referee: Andrew Jackson

24 April 2022
15:00

(1 BP) Saracens	38 – 22	Exeter Chiefs
Try: Daly 14' c Maitland 46' c Tompkins 57' m Earl 69' c Con: Farrell (3/4) 15', 47', 71'; Pen: Farrell (4/4) 10', 44', 52', 64'	Report	Try: Skinner 28' m Woodburn 34' c Townsend 78' c Con: Slade (1/2) 35'; Hogg (1/1) 79'; Pen: Slade (1/2) 6'

StoneX Stadium
Attendance: 9,645
Referee: Craig Maxwell-Keys

Bye/s: Sale Sharks

=== Round 24 ===
29 April 2022
19:45

(1 BP) Northampton Saints	32 – 31	Harlequins (2 BP)
Try: Freeman 5' c Ludlam 11' c Furbank 25' m A. Waller 36' c Con: J. Grayson (3/4) 6', 12', 37'; Pen: J. Grayson (2/2) 59', 77'	Report	Try: Esterhuizen 7' c Jones 33' c Dombrandt 45' c Murley 52' c Con: M. Smith (4/4) 8', 33', 46', 53'; Pen: M. Smith (1/1) 17'

Franklin's Gardens
Attendance: 15,113
Referee: Matthew Carley

29 April 2022
19:45

(1 BP) Sale Sharks	35 – 27	Newcastle Falcons (1 BP)
Try: A. van der Merwe (2) 18' c, 37' c B. Curry 42' c Hammersley 54' c Ashman 68' c Con: R. du Preez (5/5) 19', 38', 43', 56', 69'	Report	Try: McGuigan 9' m Hodgson 33' c M. Carreras 45' m Orlando 80+1' c Con: Hodgson (2/4) 34', 80+2'; Pen: Hodgson (1/1) 40+2'

AJ Bell Stadium
Attendance: 5,309
Referee: Jack Makepeace

30 April 2022
15:00

(1 BP) Gloucester	64 – 0	Bath
Try: C. Harris 12' c Rees-Zammit (2) 29' m, 35' c S. Carreras 40' m Morgan 42' c M. Atkinson 49' c Ludlow 59' c Meehan 66' c Ford-Robinson 75' m Alemanno 77' c Con: Hastings (7/10) 13', 36', 43', 50', 60', 67', 78'	Report

Kingsholm
Attendance: 13,566
Referee: Christophe Ridley

30 April 2022
15:00

(1 BP) Leicester Tigers	56 – 26	Bristol Bears (1 BP)
Try: Ashton (3) 4' m, 24' c, 28' c Youngs 36' m Moroni 42' c Steward 58' c J. Wiese 67' c Potter 74' m Con: Ford (4/6) 25', 29', 43', 58'; Burns (1/2) 68'; Pen: Ford (2/2) 8', 49'	Report	Try: Bates 9' c Fricker 33' m Thacker 72' c Vui 77' c Con: Sheedy (1/2) 10'; Eden (2/2) 73', 78'

Welford Road
Attendance: 20,502
Referee: Karl Dickson

30 April 2022
15:00

Worcester Warriors	16 – 38	Saracens (1 BP)
Try: Howe 77' c Con: Searle (1/1) 78'; Pen: F. Smith (3/3) 13', 26', 39'	Report	Try: Malins (4) 5' c, 42' c, 56' c, 71' c Earl 14' m Segun 18' m Con: Farrell (3/5) 6', 43', 57'; Man. Vunipola (1/1) 72'

Sixways
Attendance: 7,746
Referee: Anthony Woodthorpe

1 May 2022
15:00

(1 BP) London Irish	42 – 42	Wasps (1 BP)
Try: Rowe 18' c Parton 25' c T. Pearson 68' c Arundell 73' c Hassell-Collins 77' c Penalty try 80+3'; Con: Jackson (5/5) 19', 26', 69', 74', 78'	Report	Try: Oghre 14' c Hougaard (2) 30' c, 47' m C. Atkinson 35' c Kibirige 59' c Con: Gopperth (4/5) 15', 31', 36', 60'; Pen: Gopperth (2/2) 40+2', 56'; Umaga (1/1) 80'

Brentford Community Stadium
Attendance: 12,039
Referee: Craig Maxwell-Keys

Bye/s: Exeter Chiefs

=== Round 25 ===
20 May 2022
19:45

(1 BP) Bristol Bears	40 – 33	Exeter Chiefs (2 BP)
Try: Sheedy 22' c Piutau (2) 33' c, 47' c Leuia 52' c Fricker 63' c Morahan 75' m Con: Sheedy (4/4) 23', 33', 49', 53'; Lloyd (1/2) 64'	Report	Try: Grondona 27' c Hodge 35' c Kenny 57' c Woodburn 59' c Ewers 80+3' m Con: J. Simmonds (4/5) 28', 37', 58', 60'

Ashton Gate
Attendance: 19,118
Referee: Luke Pearce

20 May 2022
19:45

Wasps	7 – 16	Sale Sharks
Try: Oghre 23' c Con: Gopperth (1/1) 24'	Report	Try: A. van der Merwe 46' c Con: R. du Preez (1/1) 47'; Pen: R. du Preez (3/3) 30', 38', 63'

Coventry Building Society Arena
Attendance: 9,463
Referee: Ian Tempest

21 May 2022
15:00

Bath	27 – 24	London Irish (2 BP)
Try: M. Williams 34' c B. Spencer 36' c Muir 63' c Con: Bailey (3/3) 35', 37', 65'; Pen: Bailey (2/2) 57', 74'	Report	Try: Loader 7' m Rowe 20' m Creevy (2) 41' c, 50' c Con: Jackson (2/4) 42', 52'

Recreation Ground
Attendance: 14,318
Referee: Christophe Ridley

21 May 2022
15:00

(1 BP) Harlequins	28 – 24	Gloucester (1 BP)
Try: Dombrandt 17' c Marchant (2) 49' c, 60' c Murley 69' c Con: M. Smith (4/4) 18', 49', 61', 70'	Report	Try: Morgan 12' c Clarke 19' c C. Harris 31' c Con: Hastings (3/3) 13', 21', 33'; Drop: Hastings (1/2) 34'

Twickenham
Attendance: 47,421
Referee: Craig Maxwell-Keys

21 May 2022
15:00

Newcastle Falcons	5 – 27	Leicester Tigers
Try: McGuigan 50' m	Report	Try: Nadolo 14' c G. Porter 69' c Steward 79' c Con: Ford (3/3) 15', 70', 79'; Pen: Ford (2/2) 21', 64'

Kingston Park
Attendance: 8,015
Referee: Anthony Woodthorpe

21 May 2022
17:30

(1 BP) Saracens	42 – 38	Northampton Saints (2 BP)
Try: Tompkins 41' c Lewington 46' c McFarland (2) 50' m, 60' c Goode 68' c Con: Farrell (4/5) 42', 47', 61', 69'; Pen: Farrell (3/3) 2', 12', 40+2'	Report	Try: Freeman 39' c Hutchinson 57' c T. James (2) 71' c, 78' c Proctor 80+1' c Con: Biggar (4/4) 40', 58', 78', 80+2'; Hutchinson (1/1) 71'; Pen: Biggar (1/1) 35'

StoneX Stadium
Attendance: 9,053
Referee: Matthew Carley

Bye/s: Worcester Warriors

=== Round 26 ===
4 June 2022
15:00

(1 BP) Exeter Chiefs	47 – 38	Harlequins (1 BP)
Try: Gray 19' c Hogg 24' c J. Simmonds 37' m Whitten 46' c Nowell 54' c Street 69' c S. Maunder 79' c Con: J. Simmonds (6/7) 20', 26', 47', 56', 70', 80'	Report	Try: W. Evans 10' c Marchant 21' m A. Morris 34' c Lynagh 51' c Gjaltema 60' m Green 64' c Con: M. Smith (3/4) 11', 35', 52'; Allan (1/2) 66'

Sandy Park
Attendance: 14,876
Referee: Ian Tempest

4 June 2022
15:00

(1 BP) Gloucester	54 – 7	Saracens
Try: Singleton (2) 9' c, 44' m J. Reid 19' c S. Carreras 32' c Thorley 50' c Socino 58' c Rees-Zammit 68' c Clement 71' c Con: Hastings (7/8) 10', 20', 33', 51', 59', 69', 73'	Report	Try: Malins 60'; Con: Man. Vunipola (1/1) 61'

Kingsholm
Attendance: 11,500
Referee: Wayne Barnes

4 June 2022
15:00

Leicester Tigers	20 – 10	Wasps
Try: G. Porter 3' c Steward 62' c Con: Ford (2/2) 3', 63'; Pen: Ford (2/3) 68', 74'	Report	Try: W. Porter 69'; Con: C. Atkinson (1/1) 70'; Pen: Gopperth (1/1) 49'

Welford Road
Attendance: 21,722
Referee: Craig Maxwell-Keys

4 June 2022
15:00

(1 BP) Northampton Saints	65 – 26	Newcastle Falcons (1 BP)
Try: S. Matavesi (2) 8' m, 23' c Coles 19' c Mitchell 33' c Freeman (3) 42' c, 63' m, 68' m Hutchinson 60' m Skosan 74' c Ludlam 79' c Con: Biggar (6/10) 20', 24', 34', 43', 75', 80'; Pen: Biggar (1/1) 4'	Report	Try: Chick 28' c Penalty try 47'; Blamire 54' m Radwan 57' c Con: Hodgson (2/3) 29', 58'

Franklin's Gardens
Attendance: 14,666
Referee: Karl Dickson

4 June 2022
15:00

(1 BP) Sale Sharks	42 – 19	Bristol Bears
Try: Roebuck 8' c A. van der Merwe 18' c C. Wiese (2) 24' c, 41' c D. du Preez 63' c Reed 69' c Con: R. du Preez (4/4) 10', 19', 25', 42'; Wilkinson (2/2) 64', 70'	Report	Try: Fricker 51' c Hughes (2) 71' c, 75' m Con: Sheedy (2/3) 52', 72'

AJ Bell Stadium
Attendance: 5,850
Referee: Adam Leal

4 June 2022
15:00

(1 BP) Worcester Warriors	43 – 27	Bath (1 BP)
Try: Hatherall 4' c G. Simpson 44' c Shillcock (3) 52' c, 55' c, 77' c Batley 61' m Con: F. Smith (5/6) 5', 45', 53', 57', 78'; Pen: F. Smith (1/1) 31'	Report	Try: Muir (2) 19' m, 23' c Stuart 33' c Dunn 49' m Con: Bailey (2/4) 24', 34'; Pen: Bailey (1/1) 47'

Sixways
Attendance: 7,173
Referee: Anthony Woodthorpe

Bye/s: London Irish

== Play-offs ==
As in previous seasons, the top four teams in the Premiership table, following the conclusion of the regular season, contest the play-off semi-finals in a 1st vs 4th and 2nd vs 3rd format, with the higher ranking team having home advantage. The two winners of the semi-finals then meet in the Premiership Final at Twickenham on 18 June 2022.

Semi-finals
1	Leicester Tigers	27
4	Northampton Saints	14
2	Saracens	34
3	Harlequins	17

Final
1	Leicester Tigers	15
2	Saracens	12

=== Semi-finals ===
11 June 2022
13:30

Saracens	34 – 17	Harlequins
Try: Earl (3) 23' m, 41' c, 79' c Tompkins 35' c Davies 53' m Con: Farrell (3/5) 36', 42', 80+1'; Pen: Farrell (1/1) 9'	Report	Try: Dombrandt 3' m Care 19' c Murley 66' m Con: M. Smith (1/3) 20'

StoneX Stadium
Attendance: 10,500
Referee: Luke Pearce

Team details

FB	15	(England) Alex Goode
RW	14	(England) Max Malins		(substituted off) 67'
OC	13	(England) Elliot Daly	(yellow card) 56'
IC	12	(Wales) Nick Tompkins
LW	11	(Scotland) Sean Maitland		(substituted off) 71'
FH	10	(England) Owen Farrell (c)
SH	9	(Wales) Aled Davies
N8	8	(England) Billy Vunipola	(yellow card) 63'
OF	7	(England) Ben Earl
BF	6	(Samoa) Theo McFarland		(substituted off) 63'
RL	5	(Scotland) Tim Swinson		(substituted off) 45'
LL	4	(England) Maro Itoje
TP	3	(South Africa) Vincent Koch
HK	2	(England) Jamie George
LP	1	(England) Mako Vunipola		(substituted off) 71'
Substitutions:
HK	16	(United States) Kapeli Pifeleti
PR	17	(Fiji) Eroni Mawi		(substituted on) 71'
PR	18	(England) Alec Clarey
LK	19	(England) Nick Isiekwe		(substituted on) 45'
FL	20	(Scotland) Andy Christie		(substituted on) 63'
SH	21	(South Africa) Ivan van Zyl
CE	22	(Scotland) Duncan Taylor		(substituted on) 71'
CE	23	(England) Alex Lozowski	(yellow card) 73'	(substituted on) 67'
Coach:
(Ireland) Mark McCall

FB	15	(Scotland) Huw Jones		(substituted off) 54'
RW	14	(South Africa) Tyrone Green
OC	13	(England) Joe Marchant
IC	12	(South Africa) André Esterhuizen
LW	11	(England) Cadan Murley
FH	10	(England) Marcus Smith
SH	9	(England) Danny Care
N8	8	(England) Alex Dombrandt
OF	7	(England) Will Evans		(substituted off) 37'	(substituted on) 42'	(substituted off) 54'
BF	6	(South Africa) Stephan Lewies (c)
RL	5	(England) Hugh Tizard		(substituted off) 68'
LL	4	(England) Matt Symons
TP	3	(England) Will Collier		(substituted off) 57'
HK	2	(England) Jack Walker	(yellow card) 32'			(substituted off) 78'
LP	1	(England) Joe Marler		(substituted off) 76'
Substitutions:
HK	16	(England) Joe Gray		(substituted on) 37'	(substituted off) 42'	(substituted on) 78'
PR	17	(South Africa) Simon Kerrod		(substituted on) 76'
PR	18	(South Africa) Wilco Louw		(substituted on) 57'
LK	19	(England) Matas Jurevicius		(substituted on) 68'
FL	20	(England) Tom Lawday				(substituted on) 54'
SH	21	(New Zealand) Lewis Gjaltema
FH	22	(Italy) Tommaso Allan
CE	23	(England) Luke Northmore		(substituted on) 54'
Coach:
(New Zealand) Tabai Matson

Player of the Match:
(England) Ben Earl (Saracens)
Touch judges:
Christophe Ridley
Anthony Woodthorpe
Television Match Official:
Ian Tempest

11 June 2022
16:30

Leicester Tigers	27 – 14	Northampton Saints
Try: Ford 52' c Steward 69' m Con: Ford (1/2) 53'; Pen: Ford (4/5) 22', 33', 64', 80'; Drop: Ford (1/1) 77'	Report	Try: Freeman 48' m Pen: Biggar (2/2) 7', 40+2'; Grayson (1/2) 58'

Welford Road
Attendance: 22,122
Referee: Matthew Carley

Team details

FB	15	(England) Freddie Steward
RW	14	(England) Harry Potter
OC	13	(Argentina) Matías Moroni
IC	12	(England) Dan Kelly		(substituted off) 3'
LW	11	(England) Guy Porter	(yellow card) 40'
FH	10	(England) George Ford
SH	9	(England) Ben Youngs		(substituted off) 50'
N8	8	(South Africa) Jasper Wiese
OF	7	(Wales) Tommy Reffell		(substituted off) 66'
BF	6	(South Africa) Hanro Liebenberg
RL	5	(England) Calum Green
LL	4	(England) Harry Wells		(substituted off) 56'
TP	3	(England) Dan Cole		(substituted off) 56'
HK	2	(Argentina) Julián Montoya		(substituted off) 71'
LP	1	(England) Ellis Genge (c)		(substituted off) 71'
Substitutions:
HK	16	(England) Charlie Clare		(substituted on) 71'
PR	17	(Samoa) Nephi Leatigaga		(substituted on) 71'
PR	18	(England) Joe Heyes		(substituted on) 56'
LK	19	(England) Ollie Chessum		(substituted on) 56'
FL	20	(England) George Martin		(substituted on) 66'
SH	21	(England) Jack van Poortvliet		(substituted on) 50'
FH	22	(England) Freddie Burns		(substituted on) 3'	(substituted off) 76'
WG	23	(Fiji) Nemani Nadolo			(substituted on) 76'
Coach:
(England) Steve Borthwick

FB	15	(England) Tommy Freeman
RW	14	(New Zealand) Matt Proctor
OC	13	(England) Fraser Dingwall		(substituted off) 71'
IC	12	(Scotland) Rory Hutchinson
LW	11	(South Africa) Courtnall Skosan			(substituted off) 72'	(substituted on) 74'
FH	10	(Wales) Dan Biggar		(substituted off) 51'
SH	9	(England) Alex Mitchell		(substituted off) 68'
N8	8	(South Africa) Juarno Augustus		(substituted off) 56'
OF	7	(England) Lewis Ludlam (c)
BF	6	(England) Courtney Lawes
RL	5	(Fiji) Api Ratuniyarawa
LL	4	(England) Alex Coles		(substituted off) 56'
TP	3	(England) Ehren Painter		(substituted off) 53'	(substituted on) 72'	(substituted off) 74'
HK	2	(Fiji) Sam Matavesi		(substituted off) 53'
LP	1	(England) Emmanuel Iyogun		(substituted off) 53'
Substitutions:
HK	16	(England) Mike Haywood		(substituted on) 53'
PR	17	(England) Alex Waller		(substituted on) 53'
PR	18	(Ireland) Oisín Heffernan	(yellow card) 64'	(substituted on) 53'
LK	19	(South Africa) David Ribbans		(substituted on) 56'
FL	20	(England) Aaron Hinkley		(substituted on) 56'
SH	21	(England) Tom James		(substituted on) 68'
FH	22	(England) James Grayson		(substituted on) 51'
CE	23	(England) Piers Francis		(substituted on) 71'
Coach:
(New Zealand) Chris Boyd

Player of the Match:
(England) George Ford (Leicester Tigers)
Touch judges:
Craig Maxwell-Keys
Jack Makepeace
Television Match Official:
Stuart Teerhege

=== Final ===
18 June 2022
15:00

Leicester Tigers	15–12	Saracens
Try: Liebenberg 27' c J. Wiese 35' m Con: Burns (1/2) 28'; Drop: Burns (1/1) 79'	Report	Pen: Farrell (3/3) 5', 63', 76'; Daly (1/1) 30'

Twickenham
Attendance: 72,748
Referee: Wayne Barnes

Team details

Leicester Tigers
Saracens

FB	15	(England) Freddie Steward
RW	14	(England) Chris Ashton
OC	13	(Argentina) Matías Moroni		(substituted off) 58'
IC	12	(England) Guy Porter
LW	11	(England) Harry Potter
FH	10	(England) George Ford		(substituted off) 23'
SH	9	(England) Richard Wigglesworth		(substituted off) 63'
N8	8	(South Africa) Jasper Wiese
OF	7	(Wales) Tommy Reffell		(substituted off) 63'
BF	6	(South Africa) Hanro Liebenberg
RL	5	(England) Calum Green		(substituted off) 63'
LL	4	(England) Ollie Chessum
TP	3	(England) Dan Cole		(substituted off) 53'
HK	2	(Argentina) Julián Montoya		(substituted off) 63'
LP	1	(England) Ellis Genge (c)		(substituted off) 63'
Substitutions:
HK	16	(England) Charlie Clare		(substituted on) 63'
PR	17	(Samoa) Nephi Leatigaga		(substituted on) 63'
PR	18	(England) Joe Heyes		(substituted on) 53'
LK	19	(England) Harry Wells		(substituted on) 63'
FL	20	(England) George Martin		(substituted on) 63'
SH	21	(England) Ben Youngs		(substituted on) 63'
FH	22	(England) Freddie Burns		(substituted on) 23'
CE	23	(Scotland) Matt Scott	(yellow card) 75'	(substituted on) 58'
Coach:
(England) Steve Borthwick

FB	15	(England) Alex Goode
RW	14	(England) Max Malins
OC	13	(England) Elliot Daly
IC	12	(Wales) Nick Tompkins		(substituted off) 71'
LW	11	(Scotland) Sean Maitland		(substituted off) 41'
FH	10	(England) Owen Farrell (c)
SH	9	(Wales) Aled Davies	(yellow card) 25'	(substituted off) 66'
N8	8	(England) Billy Vunipola		(substituted off) 76'
OF	7	(England) Ben Earl
BF	6	(Samoa) Theo McFarland		(substituted off) 59'	(substituted on) 80'
RL	5	(England) Nick Isiekwe			(substituted off) 80'
LL	4	(England) Maro Itoje
TP	3	(South Africa) Vincent Koch
HK	2	(England) Jamie George
LP	1	(England) Mako Vunipola		(substituted off) 66'
Substitutions:
HK	16	(United States) Kapeli Pifeleti
PR	17	(Fiji) Eroni Mawi		(substituted on) 66'
PR	18	(England) Alec Clarey
FL	19	(England) Jackson Wray		(substituted on) 76'
FL	20	(Scotland) Andy Christie		(substituted on) 59'
SH	21	(South Africa) Ivan van Zyl		(substituted on) 66'
CE	22	(Scotland) Duncan Taylor		(substituted on) 71'
CE	23	(England) Alex Lozowski		(substituted on) 41'
Coach:
(Ireland) Mark McCall

Player of the Match:
(South Africa) Jasper Wiese (Leicester Tigers)
Touch judges:
Luke Pearce
Christophe Ridley
Television Match Official:
Tom Foley

== Leading scorers ==
Note: Flags to the left of player names indicate national team as has been defined under World Rugby eligibility rules, or primary nationality for players who have not yet earned international senior caps. Players may hold one or more non-WR nationalities.

=== Most points ===
As of 18 June 2022

Rank	Player	Club	Points
1	(England) George Ford	Leicester Tigers	220
2	(Ireland) Paddy Jackson	London Irish	200
3	(England) Alex Lozowski	Saracens	178
4	(Scotland) Adam Hastings	Gloucester	175
5	(Wales) Dan Biggar	Northampton Saints	174
6	(New Zealand) Jimmy Gopperth	Wasps	172
7	(Wales) Callum Sheedy	Bristol Bears	170
8	(England) Owen Farrell	Saracens	133
9	(England) Joe Simmonds	Exeter Chiefs	131
10	(England) Freddie Burns	Leicester Tigers	102

=== Most tries ===
As of 18 June 2022

Rank	Player	Club	Tries
1	(England) Max Malins	Saracens	16
2	(England) Cadan Murley	Harlequins	15
2	(England) George McGuigan	Newcastle Falcons	15
4	(Argentina) Agustín Creevy	London Irish	14
5	(England) Tommy Freeman	Northampton Saints	13
6	(England) Ben Earl	Saracens	11
6	(England) Alex Mitchell	Northampton Saints	11
6	(South Africa) Courtnall Skosan	Northampton Saints	11
9	(England) Ollie Hassell-Collins	London Irish	10
9	(England) Louis Lynagh	Harlequins	10
9	(England) Will Muir	Bath	10
9	(Fiji) Nemani Nadolo	Leicester Tigers	10
9	(England) Tom Woolstencroft	Saracens	10

== Discipline ==
=== Citings/bans ===
Player/Coach	Match (Note: The club of the cited player or coach is listed in bold italics.)	Citing date	Law breached	Result	Ref
(England) Brad Shields	**Wasps** vs. Bristol	29 September 2021	9.27 – 2 Yellow Cards (Red card)	Sending off sufficient	
(England) Ted Hill	**Worcester** vs. Gloucester	5 October 2021	9.18 – Tip Tackle (Red card)	3-match ban	
(England) Dan Kelly	**Leicester** vs. Saracens	5 October 2021	9.12 – Strike with the Shoulder (Citing)	3-match ban (Note: The ban is reduced by one match, subject to the player's completion of the World Rugby Coaching Intervention Programme.)	
(England) Tom Penny	**Newcastle** vs. Wasps	6 October 2021	9.12 – Contact with the Eye Area (Red card)	2-match ban	
(England) Tom Penny	**Newcastle** vs. Wasps	6 October 2021	Conduct Prejudicial to the Interests of the Game or Union (Rule 5.12)	Reprimand	
(England) Gabriel Oghre	**Wasps** vs. Northampton	12 October 2021	9.13 – Dangerous Tackling (Citing)	3-match ban	
(England) Pete Atkinson	**Wasps** vs. Exeter	19 October 2021	Conduct Prejudicial to the Interests of the Game or Union (Rule 5.12)	1-match ban	
(England) Scott Barrow	**Wasps** vs. Exeter	19 October 2021	Conduct Prejudicial to the Interests of the Game or Union (Rule 5.12)	1-match ban	
(Zimbabwe) Mike Williams	**Bath** vs. Wasps	2 November 2021	9.20(b) – Dangerous Play in a Ruck or Maul (Red card)	4-match ban	
(England) Stephen Middleton	**Bath** vs. Wasps	2 November 2021	Conduct Prejudicial to the Interests of the Game or Union (Rule 5.12)	1-match ban	
(Australia) Adam Coleman	Saracens vs. **London Irish**	9 November 2021	9.13 – Dangerous Tackling (Red card)	3-match ban	
(England) Anthony Watson	**Bath** (No match applicable)	15 November 2021	Conduct Prejudicial to the Interests of the Game or Union (Rule 5.12)	1-match ban	
(Scotland) Byron McGuigan	Saracens vs. **Sale**	30 November 2021	9.11 – Reckless or Dangerous Play (Red card)	3-match ban	
(England) Jacob Umaga	**Wasps** vs. London Irish	29 December 2021	9.13 – Dangerous Tackling (Red card)	3-match ban	
(South Africa) Jasper Wiese	Northampton vs. **Leicester**	29 December 2021	9.28 – 3 Yellow Cards (Totting up)	2-match ban	
(South Africa) Jasper Wiese	**Leicester** vs. Harlequins	29 December 2021	9.28 – 3 Yellow Cards (Totting up)	2-match ban	
(South Africa) Jasper Wiese	Bristol vs. **Leicester**	29 December 2021	9.28 – 3 Yellow Cards (Totting up)	2-match ban	
(Scotland) Rory Sutherland	Bath vs. **Worcester**	11 January 2022	9.13 – Dangerous Tackling (Red card)	3-match ban	
(England) Alec Hepburn	Harlequins vs. **Exeter**	11 January 2022	9.18 – Tip Tackle (Red card)	3-match ban	
(New Zealand) Chris Boyd	**Northampton** vs. Saracens	13 January 2022	Conduct Prejudicial to the Interests of the Game or Union (Rule 5.12)	2-match ban	
(Australia) Ollie Hoskins	Gloucester vs. **London Irish**	9 February 2022	9.11 – Reckless or Dangerous Play (Red card)	Citing dismissed	
(England) Semesa Rokoduguni	**Wasps** vs. Bath	15 February 2022	9.13 – Dangerous Tackling (Red card)	3-match ban	
(Fiji) Siva Naulago	**Bristol** vs. London Irish	16 February 2022	9.13 – Dangerous Tackling (Red card)	3-match ban	
(Australia) Adam Coleman	**London Irish** vs. Saracens	22 February 2022	9.13 – Dangerous Tackling (Red card)	Red card rescinded	
(England) Callum Chick	**Newcastle** vs. Exeter	22 February 2022	9.13 – Dangerous Tackling (Red card)	3-match ban	
(England) Dean Richards	**Newcastle** vs. Exeter	23 February 2022	Conduct Prejudicial to the Interests of the Game or Union (Rule 5.12)	3-match ban	
(Fiji) Siva Naulago	Bath vs. **Bristol**	8 March 2022	9.13 – Dangerous Tackling (Red card)	4-match ban	
(Scotland) Duhan van der Merwe	London Irish vs. **Worcester**	8 March 2022	9.11 – Reckless or Dangerous Play (Red card)	3-match ban	
(Australia) Curtis Rona	Leicester vs. **London Irish**	15 March 2022	9.13 – Dangerous Tackling (Red card)	3-match ban	
(Australia) Brad Davis	Leicester vs. **London Irish**	15 March 2022	Conduct Prejudicial to the Interests of the Game or Union (Rule 5.12)	2-match ban	
(South Africa) Jannes Kirsten	Worcester vs. **Exeter**	15 March 2022	9.20(a) – Dangerous Play in a Ruck or Maul (Citing)	3-match ban	
(England) Tom Hendrickson	Worcester vs. **Exeter**	15 March 2022	9.13 – Dangerous Tackling (Red card)	3-match ban	
(Argentina) Facundo Gigena	Newcastle vs. **London Irish**	25 April 2022	9.12 – Punch or Strike (Red card)	Red card rescinded	
(Scotland) Gary Graham	**Newcastle** vs. London Irish	25 April 2022	9.12 – Strike with the Head (Red card)	Red card rescinded	
(England) Sam Bedlow	**Bristol** vs. Gloucester	26 April 2022	9.13 – Dangerous Tackling (Red card)	4-match ban	
(South Africa) Jono Ross	London Irish vs. **Sale**	26 May 2022	9.28 – 3 Yellow Cards (Totting up)	1-match ban	
(South Africa) Jono Ross	**Sale** vs. Harlequins	26 May 2022	9.28 – 3 Yellow Cards (Totting up)	1-match ban	
(South Africa) Jono Ross	Wasps vs. **Sale**	26 May 2022	9.28 – 3 Yellow Cards (Totting up)	1-match ban	
(England) Sean Robinson	Northampton vs. **Newcastle**	13 June 2022	9.13 – Dangerous Tackling (Red card)	3-match ban	
(Wales) Aled Davies	Leicester vs. **Saracens**	22 June 2022	9.13 – Dangerous Tackling (Citing)	3-match ban	

== Awards ==
=== Player of the Month ===
The following received Player of the Month awards during the 2021–22 season, as selected by a panel of media commentators, in addition to monthly public polls.

Month	Nationality	Player	Position	Club
September	England	Adam Radwan	Wing	Newcastle
October	England	George Ford	Fly-Half	Leicester
November	England	Alex Mitchell	Scrum-Half	Northampton
December	England	George Ford (2)	Fly-Half	Leicester
January	South Africa	André Esterhuizen	Centre	Harlequins
February	England	Freddie Burns	Fly-Half	Leicester
March	England	George McGuigan	Hooker	Newcastle

=== End-of-season awards ===
The winners of the 2022 Premiership Rugby Awards were announced on 7 June 2022.

Player of the Season
Nationality	Nominee	Club	Winner
England	Danny Care	Harlequins	(England); Ben Earl
England	Ben Earl	Saracens	(England); Ben Earl
South Africa	André Esterhuizen	Harlequins	(England); Ben Earl
England	George Ford	Leicester	(England); Ben Earl
Argentina	Julián Montoya	Leicester	(England); Ben Earl

Breakthrough Player of the Season
Nationality	Nominee	Club	Winner
England	Henry Arundell	London Irish	(England); Henry Arundell
England	Ollie Chessum	Leicester	(England); Henry Arundell
England	Tommy Freeman	Northampton	(England); Henry Arundell
Wales	Tommy Reffell	Leicester	(England); Henry Arundell
England	Hugh Tizard	Harlequins	(England); Henry Arundell

Director of Rugby of the Season
Nationality	Nominee	Club	Winner
England	Steve Borthwick	Leicester	(England); Steve Borthwick
New Zealand	Chris Boyd	Northampton	(England); Steve Borthwick
New Zealand	Tabai Matson	Harlequins	(England); Steve Borthwick
Ireland	Mark McCall	Saracens	(England); Steve Borthwick
England	George Skivington	Gloucester	(England); Steve Borthwick

Community Player of the Season
Nationality	Nominee	Club	Winner
England	Justin Clegg	Worcester	(England); Justin Clegg
Tonga	Malakai Fekitoa	Wasps	(England); Justin Clegg
England	Simon Hammersley	Sale	(England); Justin Clegg
Ireland	Joe Joyce	Bristol	(England); Justin Clegg
England	Lewis Ludlow	Gloucester	(England); Justin Clegg
Scotland	Sean Maitland	Saracens	(England); Justin Clegg

==== Team of the Season ====
Forwards
No.	Nationality	Player	Position	Club
1	England	Ellis Genge	Prop	Leicester
2	England	George McGuigan	Hooker	Newcastle
3	England	Will Collier	Prop	Harlequins
4	South Africa	Jean-Luc du Preez	Lock	Sale
5	England	Freddie Clarke	Lock	Gloucester
6	South Africa	Hanro Liebenberg	Flanker	Leicester
7	England	Ben Earl	Flanker	Saracens
8	England	Brad Shields	Number 8	Wasps

Backs
No.	Nationality	Player	Position	Club
9	England	Danny Care	Scrum-Half	Harlequins
10	England	George Ford	Fly-Half	Leicester
11	England	Cadan Murley	Wing	Harlequins
12	South Africa	André Esterhuizen	Centre	Harlequins
13	Scotland	Chris Harris	Centre	Gloucester
14	England	Max Malins	Wing	Saracens
15	England	Freddie Steward	Full-Back	Leicester

==== Hall of Fame ====
Class of 2022
Nationality	Inductee	Position	Club(s)	Ref
England	Will Greenwood	Centre	Harlequins, Leicester	
England	Tom Varndell	Wing	Leicester, Wasps, Bristol	
England	Trevor Woodman	Prop	Bath, Gloucester, Sale	
