= Calum Green =

English rugby union player

- Born: Calum Daniel Green. 15 July 1990 (age 36) Norwich, England
- Height: 1.93 m (6 ft 4 in)
- Weight: 116 kg (18 st 4 lb)
- School: Heartsease High School

Rugby union career
- Position: Lock
Youth career
- 2002–2007: North Walsham
Senior career
Years	Team	Apps	(Points)
2007–2012	Leicester Tigers	21	(0)
2009–2012	→ Nottingham	33	(10)
2012–2014	Yorkshire Carnegie	45	(5)
2014–2019	Newcastle Falcons	123	(20)
2019–2023	Leicester Tigers	80	(10)
2007–Present	Total	302	(45)
- Correct as of 7 January 2023
International career
Years	Team	Apps	(Points)
2009–2010	England U20	8	(0)

Calum Daniel Green (born 15 July 1990) is an English rugby union player. He plays lock. He has previously played for Leicester Tigers in two spells between 2007–2012 and 2019–2023, as well as for Nottingham and Yorkshire Carnegie in the RFU Championship and featured in over 100 games for Newcastle Falcons between 2014 and 2019.

Green was a Premiership Rugby champion in 2022.

== Club career ==
Green was dual-registered for Nottingham and Leicester Tigers, which enabled him to get game time in the Championship. He made five appearances for the Tigers first team in 2009–10, notably against London Irish.

Green's Tigers debut match was a friendly against the Classic All Blacks in 2008. Despite not yet being 20, Green also played for the Leicester Tigers side in their 2009 friendly against South Africa at Welford Road, which the Tigers won 22–17. His first league appearance was a home win against Saracens in March 2009. Green was a member of the Anglo-Welsh Cup winning squad in 2011/12.

Green then joined Yorkshire Carnegie for the 2012/13 season on a two-year contract. On 7 April 2014, Green rejoined the Aviva Premiership as he agreed a deal to join Newcastle Falcons from the 2014–15 season.

On 22 April 2019 it was announced that Green was to re-join Leicester that summer, with his signing being welcomed by new teammate Dan Cole.

Green started the 2022 Premiership Rugby final as Tigers beat Saracens 15–12. In May 2023 it was announced that Green would leave Leicester at the end of his contract.

== International career ==
Green has represented England U16A, and England U20, in the 6 Nations and IRB Junior World Championship, where England came fourth.
