= Harry Wells (rugby union) =

England international rugby union player

- Born: Harry Ronald Wells; 29 September 1993 (age 33) Peterborough, England
- Height: 1.96 m (6 ft 5 in)
- Weight: 121 kg (19 st 1 lb)
- School: The King's (The Cathedral) School, Peterborough

Rugby union career
- Position: Lock / Flanker
Senior career
Years	Team	Apps	(Points)
2012–2026	Leicester Tigers	236	(65)
2013	→ Nottingham (loan)	2	(0)
2013–2016	→ Bedford Blues (loan)	51	(35)
2026	Bristol Bears	3	(0)
2012–2026	Total	292	(100)
- Correct as of 19 April 2026
International career
Years	Team	Apps	(Points)
2013	England U20	5	(10)
2021	England	1	(0)
- Correct as of 10 July 2021

Harry Ronald Wells (born 29 September 1993) is an English rugby union player. He played 236 times for Leicester Tigers between 2012 and 2026. His primary positions are lock and flanker. He has also played for Nottingham and Bedford Blues in the RFU Championship, England second division. He has won one cap for the England national team in 2021. He was a Premiership Rugby champion in 2022.

== Club career ==
Wells made his debut for Leicester aged 19 in 2013 during an LV Cup game against Wasps at Welford Road.

He joined Bedford Blues in 2014 initially on loan before making the move permanent that summer. Wells established himself in the side at lock playing more than 50 games across two and a half seasons. He featured for the side in the last Championship playoffs, after helping the side reach the top 4.

In the summer of 2016 he re-joined Tigers as a member of the first team squad. He made his Premiership debut against Bristol in November 2016, he then made his first Premiership start in February 2017 against Harlequins. Wells played as a replacement in the 2022 Premiership Rugby final as Tigers beat Saracens 15–12.

Wells played his 200th game for Leicester as they beat Exeter on 21 September 2024, the opening day of the 2024-25 Premiership Rugby season.

Wells was awarded a testimonial season at Leicester for the 2025-26 season. Wells was announced as leaving the club at the end of the 2025-26 season in May 2026.

== International career ==
Wells was initially named as a member of the England 36 man summer training squad on 10 June 2021. Wells then went on to make his international debut for England on 10 July 2021 against Canada at Twickenham.

== Personal life ==
Born in Peterborough, the first rugby match Wells watched was the 2003 Rugby World Cup final taking up the sport soon after. He has three children, one of whom has been diagnosed with autism, and Wells is an ambassador for the National Autistic Society.
