= Hugh Tizard =

English rugby union player

- Born: Hugh Peter Tizard; 31 March 2000 (age 26) Guildford, England
- Height: 1.96 m (6 ft 5 in)
- Weight: 120 kg (18 st 13 lb)
- School: Guildford County School, Cranleigh School

Rugby union career
- Position: Second row
- Current team: Saracens
Amateur team(s)
Years	Team	Apps	(Points)
–	Guildfordians RFC	–	(–)
Senior career
Years	Team	Apps	(Points)
2019–2022	Harlequins	45	(15)
2019–2020	→London Scottish	6	(0)
2022–	Saracens	55	(5)
- Correct as of 3 December 2024
International career
Years	Team	Apps	(Points)
2020	England U20	4	(0)
2024	England A	1	(0)
- Correct as of 3 December 2024

Hugh Peter Tizard (born 31 March 2000) is an English professional rugby union player, currently playing as a lock for Saracens, which competes in Premiership Rugby, the top-level competition of English rugby. He previously played for Harlequins, another London-based top-flight club.

== Club career ==
From the age of seven, Tizard began playing rugby at Guildfordians RFC, before joining the youth system at Harlequins when he was 16 years old, in addition to earning a scholarship to attend Cranleigh School. He made his senior debut in October 2019, aged 19, during the pool stage of the 2019–20 Premiership Rugby Cup, then spent the rest of that season on loan at RFU Championship side London Scottish.

Tizard became a regular player in the Harlequins first team over the course of the 2021–22 season, with 16 starts across all competitions. His first-ever try for the club was during a defeat to future team Saracens in October 2021. Following this breakthrough campaign, he was shortlisted for the Premiership Discovery of the Season Award, while also being nominated for the club's internal Academy Player of the Year Award.

In January 2022, it was confirmed that Tizard had signed with Saracens ahead of the 2022–23 season. He explained that his decision was influenced by his ambition to play for England, and his desire to play alongside British & Irish Lions international and World Rugby Player of the Year nominee Maro Itoje.

Tizard made his competitive debut for Saracens against former club Harlequins in September 2022, playing the full 80 minutes of the match to aid his new team towards a 30–27 win. Throughout the season, he established himself as a first-choice player, starting the majority of their Premiership games, as well as all of their fixtures in the 2022–23 European Champions Cup. On 27 May 2023, Tizard won his first Premiership title, as he started in the final and helped Saracens to achieve a 35–25 victory over Sale Sharks. For his contribution that season, he was chosen by his teammates as the club's Young Player of the Season, and was also included in the RPA's 15 Under 23 Team of the Season.

== International career ==
Tizard has represented England at the age-grade level, playing for the U20s. He featured in all four of the team's matches during the truncated 2020 Six Nations Under 20s Championship.

In September 2022, Tizard received his first call-up to the England senior squad, ahead of the 2022 Autumn Nations Series, although he has not yet made his test debut.

In November 2024, Tizard was called up to the England A squad, for a match against Australia A, as part of the 2024 Autumn Nations Series. He played all 80 minutes of the fixture, helping England A to record a 37–18 victory.

== Personal life ==
Tizard grew up in Guildford, Surrey. He is a supporter of the Premier League football club Liverpool

During his childhood, Tizard's favourite Premiership Rugby team was the Wasps, and he regularly attended matches when the club was based at Adams Park in High Wycombe. He cites England second-row forward Joe Launchbury as the biggest influence early on on his own career.
