= Tom Woolstencroft =

English rugby union player

- Born: Thomas Jasper Woolstencroft; 18 September 1994 (age 32) Whitechapel, London, England
- Height: 1.84 m (6 ft 0 in)
- Weight: 104 kg (229 lb; 16 st 5 lb)
- School: Bryanston School; Taunton School

Rugby union career
- Position: Hooker
Youth career
- Bath
Senior career
Years	Team	Apps	(Points)
2014–2016	Bath	2	(0)
2014–2015	→ Rosslyn Park	20	(10)
2016–2017	Wasps	0	(0)
2017–2018	London Irish	13	(0)
2018–2024	Saracens	85	(100)
- Correct as of 13 February 2024
International career
Years	Team	Apps	(Points)
- England U16
2013	England U18	1	(0)
2014	England U20	9	(10)
- Correct as of 20 June 2014

Tom Woolstencroft (born 18 September 1994) is an English former rugby union player who played in the position of hooker. He won the Premiership at Saracens and represented England at youth level.

== Career ==
Woolstencroft attended Taunton School and Bryanston School. He was a member of the England U20 squad that finished runners up in the 2014 Six Nations Under 20s Championship. Later that year he scored a try against Ireland during the semi-final of the 2014 IRB Junior World Championship. He started in the final as England defeated South Africa at Eden Park to become junior world champions.

Woolstencroft started his club career at Bath prior to joining Wasps RFC in 2016. After his time with Wasps was affected by injury he left to join London Irish the following season.

In 2018 Woolstencroft signed for Saracens. In his first season at the club he was a substitute replacement in the 2018–19 Premiership Rugby final as Saracens beat Exeter Chiefs to become league champions. That campaign also saw him feature in the European Rugby Champions Cup quarter-final victory over Glasgow Warriors although he did not play in the final which saw Saracens overcome Leinster to become champions of Europe.

After Saracens were relegated due to breach of salary cap in 2020 Woolstencroft was a member of the side that defeated Ealing Trailfinders in the RFU Championship play-off final for an immediate return to the Premiership. In 2023 Saracens became champions of England again.

In February 2024 Woolstencroft announced his retirement based on medical advice after concussion issues.

== Honours ==
Saracens

- 2× Premiership: 2018–19, 2022–23
- 1× European Rugby Champions Cup: 2018–19
- 1× RFU Championship: 2020–21

England U20

- 1× World Rugby U20 Championship: 2014
