= Orlando Bailey =

English rugby union footballer

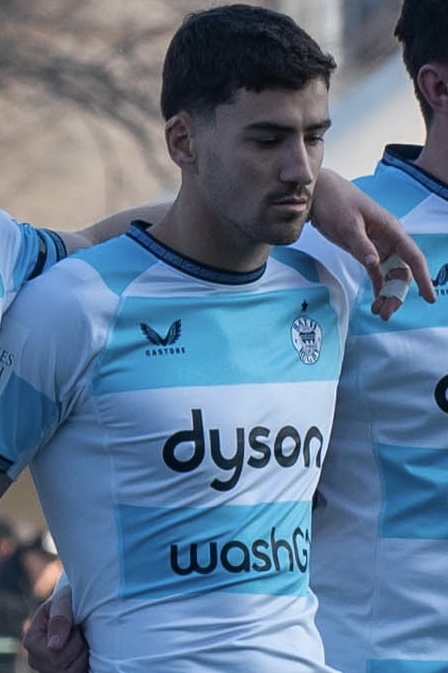
- Bailey ahead of Bath Rugby's match against Benetton Treviso, December 2024
- Born: Orlando Thomas R. Bailey; 30 September 2001 (age 25) Dorchester, Dorset, England
- Height: 1.89 m (6 ft 2 in)
- Weight: 94 kg (14 st 11 lb; 207 lb)
- School: Thomas Hardye School; Beechen Cliff School
- University: University of Bath

Rugby union career
- Position(s): Fly-half, Fullback, Centre
Youth career
- 2007–2015: Dorchester RFC
Senior career
Years	Team	Apps	(Points)
2020–2025	Bath	100	(271)
2025–	Leicester Tigers	35	(89)
- Correct as of 16 November 2026
International career
Years	Team	Apps	(Points)
2019	England U18s	7	(39)
2021	England U20s	5	(12)
2026	England A	1	(0)
- Correct as of 7 February 2026

Orlando Bailey (born 30 September 2001) is an English professional rugby union player who plays for Leicester Tigers in the Premiership Rugby.

== Club career ==
Bailey started to play rugby as a child at Dorchester RFC before joining the Bath academy at the age of fourteen. In September 2020 he made his club debut for Bath in a league game against Worcester Warriors.

On 27 June 2025, Bailey would leave his hometown club Bath to join Premiership rivals Leicester Tigers from the 2025-26 season.

== International career ==
In 2019, Bailey represented the England under-18 team. He was a member of the England under-20 squad that completed a grand slam during the 2021 Six Nations Under 20s Championship.

In January 2022, Bailey received his first call-up to the senior England squad by coach Eddie Jones for the 2022 Six Nations Championship however he subsequently withdrew due to suffering a hamstring injury during training.

On the 19th of June 2022, Bailey made his senior England debut in a 52-21 defeat against the Barbarians at Twickenham, coming on for Bath teammate Joe Cokanasiga in the 66th minute.
