= Will Witty =

English rugby union footballer

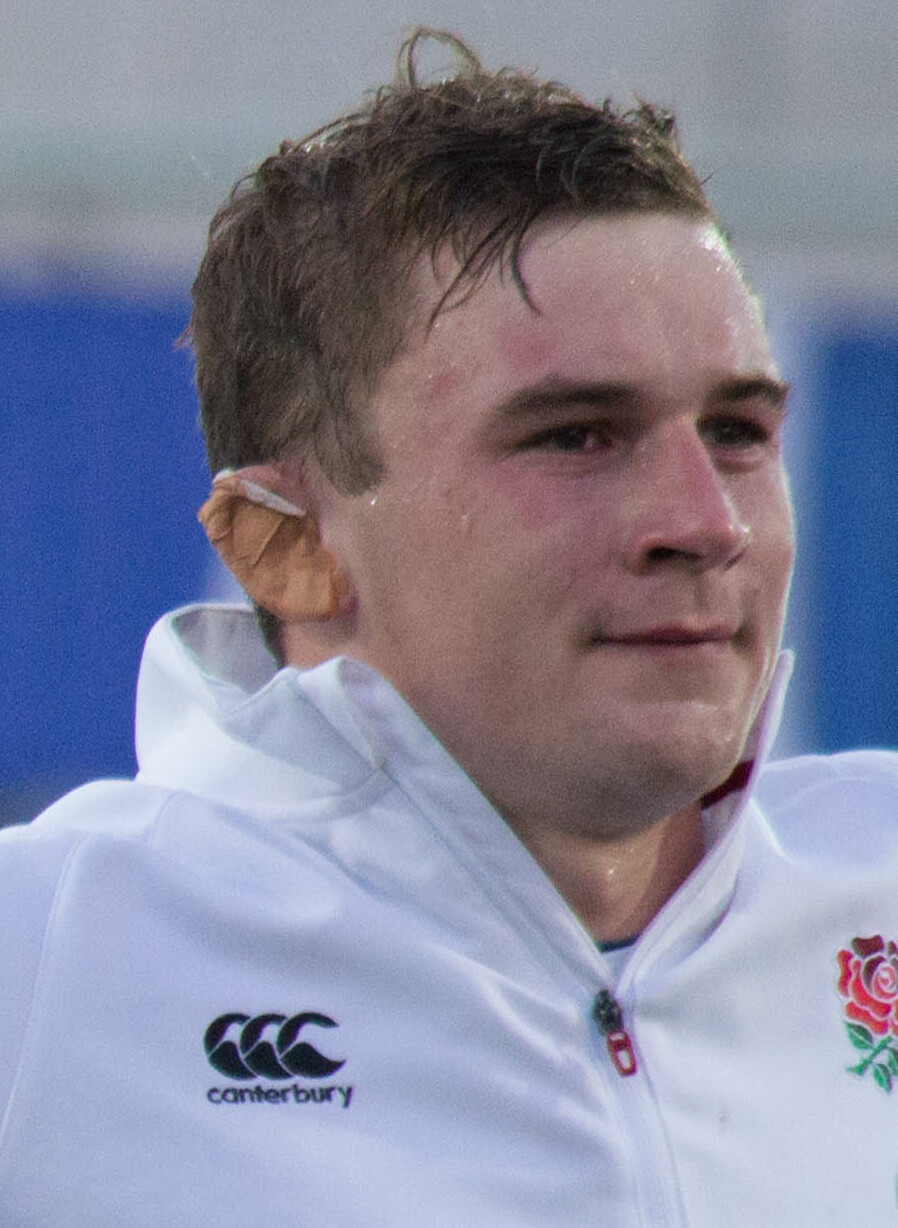
- Born: William Peter Witty; 24 February 1995 (age 31) Malton, North Yorkshire
- Height: 6 ft 5 in (196 cm)
- Weight: 260 lb (118 kg)

Rugby union career
- Position: Lock
- Current team: Exeter Chiefs
Senior career
Years	Team	Apps	(Points)
2013–2016	Blaydon	26	(30)
2013–;2019	Newcastle Falcons	77	(25)
2019–2022	Exeter Chiefs	26	(5)
2022–	Perpignan	0	(0)
- Correct as of 19 May 2019
International career
Years	Team	Apps	(Points)
2015	England U20	4	(0)

William Peter Witty (born 24 February 1995) is an English rugby union player for Exeter Chiefs in Premiership Rugby.

Witty made his Premiership debut for Newcastle Falcons in April 2015 against Gloucester. On 17 March 2019, Exeter Chiefs announced his signing for the following season.
