= Justin Clegg =

English rugby union player (born 1997)

- Born: Justin Alexander Glazier Clegg; 11 January 1997 (age 29) Birmingham, England
- Height: 2.03 m (6 ft 8 in)
- Weight: 121 kg (267 lb; 19 st 1 lb)
- School: Bromsgrove School
- University: Durham University

Rugby union career
- Position(s): Lock; Flanker
Senior career
Years	Team	Apps	(Points)
2016–2022	Worcester Warriors	50	(20)
2019–2020	Hartpury University	3	(0)
- Correct as of 11 November 2020
International career
Years	Team	Apps	(Points)
2013–2014	England U17s		
2014–2015	England U18s		
2015–2017	England U20s	7	(5)
- Correct as of 18 November 2020

Justin Clegg (born 11 January 1997) is an English rugby union player who recently played for Worcester Warriors in Premiership Rugby. His main position is lock but has played as a Flanker.

== Club career ==
Justin Clegg joined the Worcester Warriors senior academy ahead of the 2015–16 season before being promoted to the first-team in the summer of 2018. Clegg combined his rugby with a place at Durham University where he studied Geography and captained the 1st XV in his final year.

Clegg made his first-team debut in November 2016 in the Anglo-Welsh Cup defeating Bristol 31–25 at Sixways Stadium.

Clegg missed most of the 2018–19 season with a stress fracture of the back but he returned to form and fitness for the 2019/20 campaign.

He scored his first try in the European Rugby Challenge Cup victory over Enisei-STM in Krasnodar in November 2019. On 2 January 2020, Clegg signed a two-year contract extension with Worcester until the end of the 2021–22 season.

On 5 October 2022 all Worcester players had their contacts terminated due to the liquidation of the company to which they were contracted.

== International career ==
Clegg represented England through the U17 and U18 levels. Clegg was also part of the England U20s squad which won the 2017 Six Nations Under 20 Championship, beating Scotland 33–5 in the finals. He was also part of the squad that reached the final of the 2017 World Rugby Under 20 Championship, where they were defeated by New Zealand.
