= Jake Kerr (rugby union) =

Scotland international rugby union player

- Born: Jake Kerr; 13 April 1996 (age 30) Edinburgh, Scotland
- Height: 1.87 m (6 ft 2 in)
- Weight: 108 kg (17 st 0 lb)
- University: Loughborough University

Rugby union career
- Position: Hooker (rugby union)
- Current team: Bristol Bears
Youth career
- -: Edinburgh Rugby
Amateur team(s)
| Years | Team | Apps | (Points) |
| -2015 | Watsonians | | |
| 2015-2017 | Boroughmuir | | |
Senior career
| Years | Team | Apps | (Points) |
| 2017-2021 | Leicester Tigers | 45 | (5) |
| 2021-2023 | Bristol Bears | 29 | (15) |
- Correct as of 29 April 2020
Super Rugby
| Years | Team | Apps | (Points) |
| 2023 | Watsonians | 3 | (15) |
International career
| Years | Team | Apps | (Points) |
| ?-2016 | Scotland U16 | 9 | (0) |
- Scotland U18
- Scotland U20
| 2019 | Scotland | 1 | (0) |
- Correct as of 16 January 2019

Jake Kerr (born 13 April 1996) is a former Scotland national rugby union team player who played as a hooker. He is the brother of Scottish middle-distance runner Josh Kerr.

== Rugby union career ==
=== Amateur career ===
He has lifted the Brewin Dolphin Scottish Schools’ Cup on three occasions (under-16 and U18 twice) while attending George Watson's College. Kerr has played for both Watsonians and Boroughmuir in the BT Premiership in his native Scotland.

=== Professional career ===
His professional performances contributed to a move to Leicester Tigers (on the 20th of September 2017) and inclusion in their 2017/2018 Aviva Premiership senior squad. He was released in April 2021 and subsequently signed a short-term deal with Bristol Bears.

=== International career ===
On 16 January 2019 Gregor Townsend named three hookers among seven uncapped players, for his Scotland Six Nations squad. Kerr was among those selected.

Kerr came off the bench in Scotland's opening game of the 2019 Six Nations Championship and made a positive impact on the game which Scotland won 33–20 Italy, to claim his first and only cap.
