= Lewis Gjaltema =

New Zealand rugby union player

- Full name: Lewis Gjaltema
- Born: 11 December 1997 (age 28) New Zealand
- Height: 174 cm (5 ft 9 in)
- Weight: 87 kg (192 lb; 13 st 10 lb)
- School: Orewa College

Rugby union career
- Current team: Harlequins
Amateur team(s)
Years	Team	Apps	(Points)
2016-2018	East Coast Bays		
Senior career
Years	Team	Apps	(Points)
2016-2020	North Harbour	31	(10)
2020-	Harlequins	47	(20)
2023	→ London Scottish (loan)	7	(15)
- Correct as of 1 August 2023
International career
Years	Team	Apps	(Points)
2015	New Zealand Schools Barbarians	1	(0)
- Correct as of 1 August 2023

Lewis Gjaltema (born 11 December 1997) is a New Zealand rugby union player who plays as a scrumhalf for Harlequins in the English Premiership.

== Career ==
=== North Harbour ===
Gjaltema began his professional career joining North Harbour in 2016 to play in the ITM Cup. He made his debut the following year. In 2018 was voted North Harbour's Premier Club Player Of The Year. He would later go on to captain the team.

While at North Harbour he spent time training with the Auckland Blues wider training squad. Where he trained with future Harlequins teammate Joe Marchant.

=== Harlequins ===
He joined Harlequins before the 2020–21 season, making his debut in the Premiership Rugby Cup. In March 2023 he extended his contract with Harlequins.

=== London Scottish ===
He has spent time on dual-registration at RFU Championship side London Scottish making his debut against Doncaster Knights.

== International career ==
While playing rugby for Orewa college, he impressed and was selected for New Zealand Schools Barbarians. He was then later selected for the New Zealand U20s wider training squad.
