= Christophe Ridley =

English rugby union referee

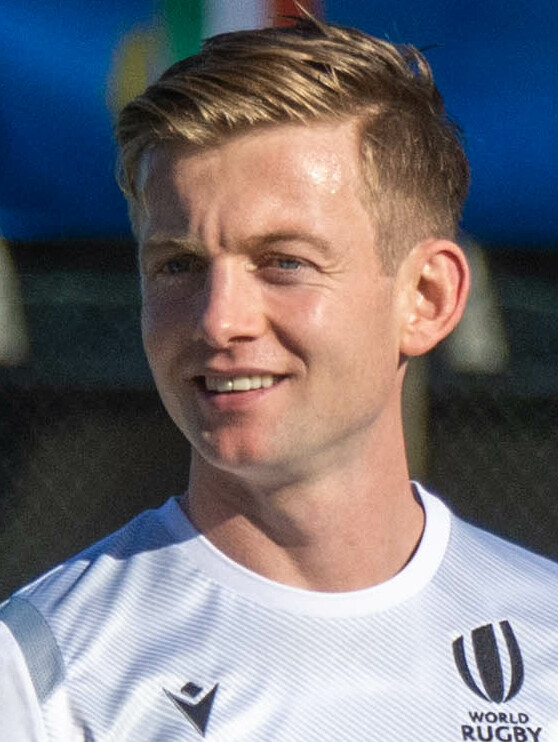
- Born: 16 April 1993 (age 33) Paris, France

Rugby union career
Refereeing career
Years	Competition	Apps
2016–	Premiership Rugby	56
2022–	United Rugby Championship	1

Christophe Ridley (born 16 April 1993) is a French-born rugby referee.

== Career ==
Previously a student at the University of Gloucestershire, Ridley began refereeing professionally in 2016. He has been a regular referee in Premiership Rugby and has also refereed in the European Rugby Champions Cup and EPCR Challenge Cup. He made his debut in the United Rugby Championship in the 2021-22 season) (Munster vs. Leinster), and in the Six Nations Championship in 2024 (France vs. Italy). Ridley was appointed to referee the 2024 premiership final between Bath and Northampton, having been an Assistant Referee in the 2 previous finals. He also refereed a controversial match in September 2025 that was roundly criticised by both sides.
