= Harry Elrington =

- Born: Harry James Elrington; 5 December 1993 (age 32) Guildford, England
- Height: 1.89 m (6 ft 2 in)
- Weight: 123 kg (19 st 5 lb; 271 lb)
- School: Cranleigh School
- University: Loughborough University

Rugby union career
- Position: Loosehead Prop
Amateur team(s)
Years	Team	Apps	(Points)
2012–2015	Loughborough Students		
- Correct as of 8 September 2021
Senior career
Years	Team	Apps	(Points)
2015–2021	London Irish	85	(15)
2021–	Gloucester	6	(0)
- Correct as of 16 November 2021

Harry Elrington (born 5 December 1993) is an English rugby union player who plays for Gloucester in the Premiership Rugby.

Elrington joined the London Irish academy following his graduation from Loughborough University for the 2015–16 season. He had a loan spell with Rosslyn Park in the National League 1 competition for development. He made his debut in the RFU Championship match with a 36–12 victory over Richmond.

On 7 April 2017, Elrington signed his first professional contract with London Irish, thus promoted to the senior squad from the 2017–18 season. After six seasons playing at Brentford Community Stadium, he departed London Irish to sign for Premiership rivals Gloucester from the 2021–22 season.

Elrington was called up to the England squad on 15 November 2021 as cover for their game against South Africa as part of the 2021 Autumn Nations Series.
