= Will Haydon-Wood =

English rugby union player

- Born: 27 October 2000 (age 26) Reading, Berkshire, England
- Height: 1.88 m (6 ft 2 in)
- Weight: 87 kg (13.7 st; 192 lb)
- School: Sedbergh School

Rugby union career
- Position: Fly-half
Amateur team(s)
Years	Team	Apps	(Points)
2019-2020	Tynedale RFC		
Senior career
Years	Team	Apps	(Points)
2020–2022	Newcastle Falcons	25	(78)
2022	Wasps	4	(20)
2022–2023	RC Massy	7	(8)
2023–	Exeter Chiefs	20	(18)
- Correct as of 29 July 2024
International career
Years	Team	Apps	(Points)
2018	England U18	3	(0)
2020	England U20	2	(2)
- Correct as of 6 March 2020

Will Haydon-Wood (born 27 October 2000) is an English professional rugby union player who plays as a fly-half for Premiership Rugby club Exeter Chiefs

== Early life ==
Hayden-Wood is from Neston, on the Wirral, and played his junior rugby at Caldy RFC before moving to Sedbergh School when he was 13 years-old. He then joined the academy at Newcastle Falcons. In 2019, he joined Tynedale RFC on loan from Newcastle.

== Career ==
Haydon-Wood made his debut for Newcastle Falcons in the EPCR Challenge Cup away to Castres Olympique in December 2020. He made his made his Rugby Premiership debut against Exeter Chiefs in May 2021. During the 2021-22 season he made thirteen appearances for Newcastle, but joined Premiership rivals Wasps RFC in April 2022.

Haydon-Wood made his debut appearance for Wasps in the Rugby Premiership against Northampton Saints, however soon afterwards Wasps were liquidated due to financial issues and he was made redundant along with all other players and coaching staff. In October 2022, he signed for French side RC Massy for the remainder of the 2022-23 season.

He signed for Exeter Chiefs prior to the start of the 2023-24 season.

== International career ==
Haydon-Wood represented England U20 during the 2020 Six Nations Under 20s Championship.
