= Isaac Curtis-Harris =

English rugby union player

- Born: Isaac James Curtis-Harris; 13 October 1997 (age 29) Basingstoke, England
- Height: 1.85 m (6 ft 1 in)
- Weight: 100 kg (15 st 10 lb)
- School: Forthill Community School
- University: Wellington college

Rugby union career
- Position(s): Flanker, Number 8
- Current team: London Irish
Amateur team(s)
Years	Team	Apps	(Points)
- Basingstoke RFC
Senior career
Years	Team	Apps	(Points)
2016–	London Irish		
- Correct as of 28 December 2020
Provincial / State sides
Years	Team	Apps	(Points)
- Hampshire
- Correct as of 28 December 2020

Isaac Curtis-Harris (born 13 October 1997) is an English rugby union player who plays for London Irish in the Premiership Rugby.
