= Thomas Roebuck =

Scottish army officer of the East India Company, orientalist and lexicographer

- Born: 1781; Linlithgowshire, Scotland, United Kingdom
- Died: 8 December 1819 (aged 37–38); Calcutta
- Relatives: John Roebuck (grandfather); John Arthur Roebuck (cousin)

Thomas Roebuck (1781–1819) was a Scottish army officer of the East India Company, known as an orientalist and lexicographer.

== Life ==
A grandson of inventor John Roebuck, he was born in Linlithgowshire; politician John Arthur Roebuck was a cousin. Born in 1781, he attended school at Alloa, and then Edinburgh High School. His uncle, Benjamin Roebuck (died 1809), of the Madras civil service, found him an appointment with the East India Company, and early in 1801 he left England to enter the 17th regiment of native infantry as a cadet. He became lieutenant-captain on 17 September 1812, and captain on 15 June 1815.

Roebuck learned Hindustani, and was asked to use it when his regiment was on active service. In poor health, he obtained leave from 1806–1809, and returned to the United Kingdom. In March 1811, Roebuck was attached to Fort William College, Madras, as assistant-secretary and examiner. He was a member of the Asiatic Society.

Roebuck died of fever at Calcutta on 8 December 1819.

== Works ==
During his leave, Roebuck spent time in Edinburgh assisting John Borthwick Gilchrist with an English-Hindustani dictionary, and two volumes of the British-Indian Monitor for 1806–8. On the return voyage, he compiled An English and Hindustani Naval Dictionary with a short grammar (Calcutta, 1811; 2nd edit. 1813; 4th 1848; 5th, re-edited and enlarged as a Laskari Dictionary by George Small, M.A., London, 1882).

At Fort William College, Roebuck superintended the publication of a Hindustani version of Persian tales, and edited, with notes in Persian, a Hindu-Persian dictionary (Calcutta, 1818). Just before his death he completed The Annals of the College of Fort William (Calcutta, 1819) and A Collection of Proverbs and Proverbial Phrases in the Persian and Hindustani Languages (Calcutta, 1824). His notes for a Hindustani lexicon were deposited in the library of the college.
