= Jack Bates =

English rugby union player (born 2001)

- Born: 26 May 2001 (age 25) Bristol, England
- Height: 1.84 m (6 ft 0 in)
- Weight: 93 kg (205 lb; 14 st 9 lb)
- School: South Gloucestershire and Stroud College

Rugby union career
- Position(s): Centre, Wing
- Current team: Bristol Bears
Senior career
| Years | Team | Apps | (Points) |
| 2020– | Bristol Bears | 51 | (35) |
- Correct as of 17 January 2025
International career
| Years | Team | Apps | (Points) |
| 2018–2019 | England U18 | 4 | (0) |
| 2021 | England U20 | 5 | (5) |
- Correct as of 13 July 2021

Jack Bates (born 26 May 2001) is an English professional rugby union footballer who plays centre or wing for Premiership Rugby club Bristol Bears.

== Early life ==
Born and raised in Bristol, Bates was educated at SGS College and is a product of the Bristol Bears academy having joined aged 14 years-old. He also played for St Brendan's RFC and Cleve RFC as a junior.

== Club career ==
Bates signed professional terms with Bristol Bears in 2019 having graduated through the club's Academy system ahead of the 2019-20 season. He is capable of playing centre and wing. He made his Premiership Rugby debut against Sale Sharks in August 2020. This debut, at the age of 19 years and 95 days, made him the second-youngest player to start a game for Bristol in the top-flight since leagues were introduced in 1987.

Bates had a breakthrough season in 2021-22, making 17 appearances in all competitions and scoring three tries. In December 2022, he signed a new contract with Bristol having made 30 appearances for the club.

== International career ==
Bates represented England at under-18 level. He started all five games for England U20 during the 2021 Six Nations Under 20s Championship and scored his only try of the tournament in the last round as England defeated Italy at Cardiff Arms Park to complete a grand slam.

Bates is also eligible to play for Wales, as his grandmother is from Cardiff.
