= Arron Reed =

English rugby union player

- Full name: Arron James Reed
- Born: 10 July 1999 (age 27) Chester, England
- Height: 1.78 m (5 ft 10 in)
- Weight: 84 kg (185 lb; 13 st 3 lb)
- School: Kirkham Grammar School

Rugby union career
- Position: Wing
- Current team: Sale Sharks
Senior career
Years	Team	Apps	(Points)
2017–	Sale Sharks	95	(140)
- Correct as of 16 March 2024
International career
Years	Team	Apps	(Points)
2017	England U18	5	(15)
2019	England U20	4	(5)
2024–	Scotland	3	(20)
2024–	Scotland A	2	(5)

Arron James Reed (born 10 July 1999) is a Scotland international rugby union player who plays as a wing for Premiership Rugby club Sale Sharks. Born in England, he represents Scotland at international level qualifying on ancestry grounds from his father, who was from Linlithgow.

== Club career ==
Reed was educated at Kirkham Grammar School and joined the Sale Sharks academy at the age of fifteen. In November 2017 he made his club debut for Sale against Worcester Warriors in the Anglo-Welsh Cup.

In April 2017 Reed scored two tries for England under-18 against Ireland. He scored a try for England under-20 against Scotland in the final round of the 2019 Six Nations Under 20s Championship. Later that year he was a member of the squad at the 2019 World Rugby Under 20 Championship however an injury sustained in a pool match against Italy ruled him out for the rest of the tournament.

== International career ==
Reed, was named in the initial Scotland squad for the Six Nations on 16 January 2024.

He made his Scotland debut against Canada on 6 July 2024 at TD Place Stadium in Ottawa. Scotland won the match 73 points to 12. Reed scored two tries in the match. Reed has the Scotland no. 1223.

He played for Scotland 'A' on 6 February 2026 in their match against Italy XV.
