= 2024–25 Premiership Rugby Cup =

Rugby Union Cup tournament in England

- Countries: England
- Number of teams: 20
- Date: 1 November 2024 – 16 March 2025
- Champions: Bath (1st title)
- Runners-up: Exeter Chiefs
- Matches played: 67
- Attendance: 348,824 (average 5,206 per match)
- Highest attendance: 20,122 – Leicester v Northampton, 1 February 2025
- Lowest attendance: 525 – Caldy v Doncaster, 23 November 2024
- Tries scored: 567 (average 8.5 per match)
- Top point scorer: 103 – Josh Hodge (Exeter)
- Top try scorer: 11 – Paul Brown-Bampoe (Exeter)

Official website
- www.premiershiprugby.com

The 2024–25 Premiership Rugby Cup is the 52nd season of England's national rugby union cup competition and the second under the new Premiership Rugby Cup format, including clubs from both the Premiership and Championship. Gloucester are the reigning champions.

Bath would finish as the Premiership Rugby Cup champions, defeating Exeter Chiefs 48–14 in the final at Sandy Park on 16 March 2025.

== Competition format ==
The format will involve 20 teams – all 10 clubs from the 2024–25 Premiership Rugby and 10 out of 12 clubs from the 2024–25 RFU Championship.

The 20 teams will be divided into 5 regional pools, each made up of 4 teams, with each side playing 6 games (3 home, 3 away). This is a change from the previous season, where Premiership clubs typically had more home fixtures than the Championship sides.

The remaining 2 Championship clubs, Cambridge and Chinnor, were not invited, as Cambridge had finished 11th in the previous season, and Chinnor were newly promoted into the league. This was despite 22 teams being involved in the competition in the 2023–24 edition. The two excluded clubs set up a two-club two-leg challenge match, the "Not The Prem Cup" as a form of protest.

== Teams ==
Locations of Premiership Rugby Cup teams
Premiership Rugby Cup clubs in Greater London

Club	League	Stadium	Capacity	City/Area
Ampthill	Championship	Dillingham Park	3,000	Ampthill, Bedfordshire
Bath	Premiership	The Recreation Ground	14,509	Bath, Somerset
Bedford Blues	Championship	Goldington Road	5,000	Bedford, Bedfordshire
Bristol Bears	Premiership	Ashton Gate	27,000	Bristol
Caldy	Championship	Paton Field	4,000	Thurstaston, Wirral, Merseyside
Cornish Pirates	Championship	Mennaye Field	4,000	Penzance, Cornwall
Coventry	Championship	Butts Park Arena	5,250	Coventry, West Midlands
Doncaster Knights	Championship	Castle Park	5,183	Doncaster, South Yorkshire
Ealing Trailfinders	Championship	Trailfinders Sports Ground	5,000	West Ealing, London
Exeter Chiefs	Premiership	Sandy Park	15,600	Exeter, Devon
Gloucester	Premiership	Kingsholm	16,115	Gloucester, Gloucestershire
Harlequins	Premiership	Twickenham Stoop	14,800	Twickenham, Greater London
Hartpury University	Championship	Hartpury Stadium	2,000	Hartpury, Gloucestershire
Leicester Tigers	Premiership	Welford Road	25,849	Leicester, Leicestershire
London Scottish	Championship	Athletic Ground	4,500	Richmond, London
Newcastle Falcons	Premiership	Kingston Park	10,200	Newcastle upon Tyne, Tyne and Wear
Northampton Saints	Premiership	Franklin's Gardens	15,249	Northampton, Northamptonshire
Nottingham	Championship	Lady Bay Sports Ground	3,700 (Note: The Lady Bay Sports Ground capacity increased from 3,500 to 3,700 for the 2024–25 season.)	Nottingham, Nottinghamshire
Sale Sharks	Premiership	Salford Community Stadium	12,000	Salford, Greater Manchester
Saracens	Premiership	StoneX Stadium	10,500	Hendon, Greater London

== Pools ==
Teams played every other team in their pool twice, once at home and once away. The group winners and three best placed runners up would qualify for the quarter finals.

- If teams are level at any stage, tiebreakers are applied in the following order:
1. Number of matches won
2. Difference between points for and against
3. Total number of points for
4. Total number of tries scored

=== Pool A ===
2024–25 Premiership Rugby Cup Pool A table
Pos	Team	Pld	W	D	L	PF	PA	PD	TF	TA	TB	LB	Pts	Qualification
1	Newcastle Falcons	6	5	0	1	224	116	+108	32	15	5	1	26	Qualifies for play-offs
2	Sale Sharks	6	4	0	2	176	123	+53	26	16	4	2	22	Qualifies for play-offs
3	Doncaster Knights	6	3	0	3	194	154	+40	27	22	4	2	18	
4	Caldy	6	0	0	6	64	265	−201	10	40	0	0	0	

Source: Premiership Rugby

=== Pool B ===
2024–25 Premiership Rugby Cup Pool 2 table
Pos	Team	Pld	W	D	L	PF	PA	PD	TF	TA	TB	LB	Pts	Qualification
1	Northampton Saints	6	5	0	1	230	161	+69	35	21	5	0	25	Qualifies for play-offs
2	Leicester Tigers	6	4	0	2	280	171	+109	42	30	4	0	20	
3	Coventry	6	3	0	3	202	192	+10	31	28	4	0	16	
4	Nottingham	6	0	0	6	146	334	−188	22	51	3	1	4	

Source: Premiership Rugby

=== Pool C ===
2024–25 Premiership Rugby Cup Pool 3 table
Pos	Team	Pld	W	D	L	PF	PA	PD	TF	TA	TB	LB	Pts	Qualification
1	Harlequins	6	4	0	2	196	137	+59	26	18	6	2	24	Qualifies for play-offs
2	Ealing Trailfinders	6	4	0	2	193	141	+52	28	20	5	1	22	Qualifies for play-offs
3	Saracens	6	4	0	2	225	161	+64	44	23	3	0	19	
4	London Scottish	6	0	0	6	83	258	−175	13	38	2	0	2	

Source: Premiership Rugby

=== Pool D ===
2024–25 Premiership Rugby Cup Pool 4 table
Pos	Team	Pld	W	D	L	PF	PA	PD	TF	TA	TB	LB	Pts	Qualification
1	Bath	6	5	0	1	286	99	+187	44	15	4	0	24	Qualifies for play-offs
2	Bristol Bears	6	4	0	2	254	170	+84	40	25	4	0	20	
3	Bedford Blues	6	3	0	3	122	158	−36	18	24	2	0	14	
4	Ampthill	6	0	0	6	49	284	−235	6	47	0	0	0	

Source: Premiership Rugby

=== Pool E ===
2024–25 Premiership Rugby Cup Pool 5 table
Pos	Team	Pld	W	D	L	PF	PA	PD	TF	TA	TB	LB	Pts	Qualification
1	Exeter Chiefs	6	5	0	1	246	60	+186	38	8	5	0	25	Qualifies for play-offs
2	Gloucester	6	4	1	1	126	125	+1	19	19	3	0	21	Qualifies for play-offs
3	Cornish Pirates	6	1	0	5	130	218	−88	19	32	3	2	9	
4	Hartpury University	6	1	1	4	98	197	−99	13	30	2	1	9	

Source: Premiership Rugby

== Fixtures and results ==
The fixtures were announced on 20 August 2024, with the first game taking place on 1 November 2024, and the final taking place on the weekend of 14 March 2025.

=== Round 1 ===
==== Pool A ====
1 November 2024
19:30

(2 BP) Doncaster Knights	37–43	Sale Sharks (1 BP)
Try: J. Olowofela (2) 31' c, 43' m Wacokecoke 37' c Currie 40' c Veainu 61' m Con: Bennett (3/5) 31', 37', 40'; Pen: Bennett (2/2) 5', 16'	Report	Try: McElroy (2) 12' c, 20' c Riley 47' m Ene 55' c Penalty try 73'; Roets 77' c Con: Curtis (3/4) 12', 20', 55'; Wardle (1/1) 77'; Pen: Curtis (1/1) 27'

Castle Park
Attendance: 2,408
Referee: Richard Gordon

2 November 2024
14:00

Caldy	12–33	Newcastle Falcons (1 BP)
Try: Rabbette 58' m Wynn 69' c Con: Rabbette (1/2) 69'	Report	Try: Spencer 5' m O'Sullivan 7' c McDonald 40' c Greenwood 65' c Radwan 78' c Con: Connon (4/5) 8', 40', 66', 79'

Paton Field
Attendance: 1,370
Referee: Mike Hudson

Source: The Rugby Paper

==== Pool B ====
1 November 2024
19:45

(1 BP) Northampton Saints	31–12	Leicester Tigers
Try: Pollock 14' c Ramm 22' c Litchfield 31' m Hendy 53' c Baker 58' m Con: Makepeace-Cubitt (3/5) 15', 23', 54'	Report	Try: Satala-Navlivou 8' c Wand 79' m Con: Shillcock (1/2) 8'

Franklin's Gardens
Attendance: 15,249
Referee: Harry Walbaum

1 November 2024
19:45

Nottingham	15–34	Coventry (1 BP)
Try: R. Olowofela 45' c Ecclesfield 69' m Con: Arden (1/1) 45'; Pen: Arden (1/1) 13'	Report	Try: Robson 22' m M. Johnson 27' c Martin 47' c Poole 56' m Hutler 74' m W. Lane 79' m Con: Richman (2/5) 27', 48'

Lady Bay Sports Ground
Attendance: 1,219
Referee: Andy Wigley

Source: The Rugby Paper

==== Pool C ====
2 November 2024
15:00

(1 BP) Ealing Trailfinders	29–19	Saracens
Try: Farrar 2' c Bird-Tulloch (2) 5' m, 25' m Penalty try 32'; Kernohan 43' m Con: D. Jones (1/4) 3'	Report	Try: Jackson (2) 38' m, 76' c Moore-Aiono 51' c Con: Swiel (2/3) 52', 77'

Trailfinders Sports Ground
Attendance: 2,228
Referee: Joe James

2 November 2024
15:00

(1 BP) London Scottish	22–35	Harlequins (1 BP)
Try: Scott 36' m Simonds 39' m Wardell 60' m Brown 80' c Con: Wilstead (1/3) 80'	Report	Try: Hyde (2) 3' c, 67' c Joseph 14' c Schmid 24' c White 64' c Con: Benson (5/5) 4', 15', 25', 65', 68'

Athletic Ground
Attendance: 821
Referee: Hamish Grant

Source: The Rugby Paper

==== Pool D ====
2 November 2024
14:00

Ampthill	0–73	Bath (1 BP)
	Report	Try: McConnochie (2) 2' c, 51' c K. Tuipulotu (3) 11' m, 25' c, 39' c Staddon 42' c Spandler (2) 58' c, 74' c Roux 65' c Hennessey 70' m Griffin 76' c Con: O. Bailey (9/11) 3', 25', 39', 43', 51', 58', 66', 75', 76'

Dillingham Park
Attendance: 1,986
Referee: Alex Thomas

2 November 2024
15:00

(1 BP) Bristol Bears	67–19	Bedford Blues
Try: J. Jenkins 1' c Marmion 5' c Fricker 11' c Thacker (2) 18' m, 70' m Bates 22' m Elizalde 25' m Thomas 29' c Heenan 53' m Ravouvou (2) 60' c, 65' c Con: Worlsey (6/10) 2', 6', 12', 30', 61', 66'	Report	Try: Herman 34' c Maisey 38' c Garside 75' m Con: Maisey (2/2) 35', 39'

Ashton Gate
Attendance: 6,306
Referee: Jack Makepeace

Source: The Rugby Paper

==== Pool E ====
1 November 2024
19:45

Cornish Pirates	7–68	Exeter Chiefs (1 BP)
Try: Houston 22' c Con: Houston (1/1) 23'	Report	Try: Rigg (2) 2' c, 39' c Brown-Bampoe (3) 8' c, 16' c, 73' c Hodge (2) 26' c, 62' c Frost 36' m Skinner 58' c Innard 66' c Con: Hodge (9/10) 3', 9', 17', 26', 39', 59', 63', 67', 74'

Mennaye Field
Attendance: 2,700
Referee: Sara Cox

2 November 2024
14:30

(2 BP) Hartpury University	26–31	Gloucester (1 BP)
Try: Morgan 10' c Denty 34' c Austin 42' m Penalty try 71'; Con: Bazalgette (2/3) 11', 35'	Report	Try: Clarke (3) 4' c, 38' c, 60' m Tuisue 15' m Hathaway 25' c Con: Taylor (3/5) 5', 26', 39'

Hartpury Stadium
Attendance: 1,743
Referee: George Selwood

Source: The Rugby Paper

=== Round 2 ===
==== Pool A ====
8 November 2024
19:45

(1 BP) Sale Sharks	40–7	Caldy
Try: Ene (4) 5' c, 10' c, 21' c, 40' c Wills 57' m McElroy 65' c Con: Curtis (5/6) 6', 11', 22', 40', 66'	Report	Try: Penalty try 50'

Salford Community Stadium
Attendance: 4,627
Referee: Hamish Grant

10 November 2024
15:00

(1 BP) Newcastle Falcons	31–28	Doncaster Knights (2 BP)
Try: Hearle 17' c Fletcher 21' c Grayson 28' c Lockwood 40' c Con: Connon (4/4) 18', 22', 29', 40+1'; Pen: Connon (1/1) 65'	Report	Try: McVie 50' c Currie 61' c Edwards 67' c Veainu 71' c Con: Bennett (4/4) 51', 62', 68', 72'

Kingston Park
Attendance: 4,113
Referee: Joe James

Source: The Rugby Paper

==== Pool B ====
9 November 2024
15:00

Leicester Tigers	19–33	Coventry (1 BP)
Try: Wand 4' m Kata 53' c Van der Flier 64' c Con: Threlfall (2/3) 54', 65'	Report	Try: Hinkley 13' c Poole 16' c Hitchcock 19' m Opoku 22' c Nayalo 67' c Con: Mathews (4/5) 14', 17', 23', 68'

Welford Road
Attendance: 15,200
Referee: George Selwood

9 November 2024
17:15

(1 BP) Northampton Saints	31–29	Nottingham (2 BP)
Try: Scott-Young 7' m Cousins 50' c McParland 54' c Brown 58' c Wright 67' m Con: Makepeace-Cubitt (3/5) 51', 55', 60'	Report	Try: Dickinson (2) 3' m, 34' c Sio 19' c Ferreira 23' c Con: Arden (3/4) 20', 25', 35'; Pen: Arden (1/1) 65'

Franklin's Gardens
Attendance: 7,122
Referee: Dan Jones

Source: The Rugby Paper

==== Pool C ====
8 November 2024
19:45

(1 BP) Harlequins	38–33	Ealing Trailfinders (2 BP)
Try: Lawday 7' c Anderson 19' c Benson 28' c Penalty try 43'; Hammond 50' c Con: Benson (4/4) 8', 20', 29', 51'; Pen: Benson (1/1) 77'	Report	Try: T. Wilson 2' m Collins (2) 37' c, 59' c Cornish 41' c Holgate 80+4' c Con: D. Jones (3/4) 37', 42', 60'; Willis (1/1) 80+5'

Twickenham Stoop
Attendance: 4,316
Referee: Jack Makepeace

9 November 2024
17:30

(1 BP) Saracens	99–27	London Scottish (1 BP)
Try: Eke 5' c Hadfield (6) 11' c, 27' c, 30' c, 48' c, 51' c, 58' m Michelow 17' c Jackson 23' c Braley 40' c Moore-Aiono 61' c Hall (2) 63' c, 65' m J. Bracken 70' c Hammick 74' m Con: Swiel (9/9) 6', 12', 18', 24', 28', 31', 40+1', 49', 52'; Eden (3/6) 62', 64', 71'	Report	Try: Nutton 13' c Bellamy 45' m Talbot-Davies 53' c Brown 79' m Con: Wilstead (2/3) 13', 54'; Pen: Wilstead (1/1) 8'

StoneX Stadium
Attendance: 2,050
Referee: Richard Gordon

Source: The Rugby Paper

==== Pool D ====
8 November 2024
19:45

(1 BP) Bedford Blues	26–6	Ampthill
Try: Adamson (2) 3' c, 25' c Herman (2) 62' c, 68' m Con: Maisey (3/4) 4', 26', 63'	Report	Pen: J. Barton (2/2) 2', 32'

Goldington Road
Attendance: 3,845
Referee: Craig Maxwell-Keys

9 November 2024
13:00

(1 BP) Bath	78–19	Bristol Bears
Try: Staddon 5' c Parry (2) 12' m, 48' c Hennessey (2) 16' c, 69' c K. Tuipulotu 21' m Carr-Smith (2) 36' c, 52' c McConnochie (2) 45' m, 56' c A. Green 77' c Offiah 80' c Con: O. Bailey (3/5) 6', 17', 37'; Donoghue (6/7) 49', 53', 57', 70', 79', 80'	Report	Try: J. Jenkins 29' c Capon 65' m Boshoff 75' c Con: R. Lane (2/3) 31', 76'

The Recreation Ground
Attendance: 10,100
Referee: Hamish Smales

Source: The Rugby Paper

==== Pool E ====
9 November 2024
13:00

(1 BP) Exeter Chiefs	54–3	Hartpury University
Try: Fisilau (3) 10' c, 25' c, 41' c Hodge (2) 20' c, 50' c Frost 38' m Rigg 54' c Skinner 76' c Con: Hodge (7/8) 11', 21', 26', 42', 51', 55, 77'	Report	Pen: Balzagette (1/1) 3'

Sandy Park
Attendance: 8,445
Referee: Tom Foley

9 November 2024
15:00

(1 BP) Gloucester	36–28	Cornish Pirates (2 BP)
Try: Thorley 23' c Knight 36' m Adderly-Jones 56' c Nelson 56' c Reeves 69' c Con: Taylor (4/5) 23', 56', 61', 69'; Pen: Taylor (1/2) 80'	Report	Try: Gibson 15' c King 50' c Moody (2) 66' c, 76' c Con: Houston (4/4) 16', 51', 67', 77'

Kingsholm
Attendance: 8,394
Referee: Andy Wigley

Source: The Rugby Paper

=== Round 3 ===
==== Pool A ====
22 November 2024
19:45

(1 BP) Newcastle Falcons	28–27	Sale Sharks (2 BP)
Try: Blamire 33' m Gordon 52' m Radwan 59' m Pepper 76' c Con: Connon (1/4) 77'; Pen: Connon (2/3) 29', 72'	Report	Try: McElroy (2) 22' m, 40' c Dugdale 57' c Birch 68' m Con: Curtis (2/4) 40+1', 58'; Pen: Curtis (1/1) 66'

Kingston Park
Attendance: 3,604
Referee: George Selwood

23 November 2024
14:00

Caldy	19–43	Doncaster Knights (1 BP)
Try: Robinson 8' c Gallagher 18' m Hearn 76' c Con: B. Jones (1/2) 9'; Kilcourse (1/1) 77'	Report	Try: Strong 13' c Kerr 36' c Currie 50' c J. Olowofela 56' c Rokoduguni 60' c Holden 71' m Con: Dolly (5/6) 14', 37', 51', 57', 61'; Pen: Dolly (1/1) 43'

Paton Field
Attendance: 525
Referee: Andy Wigley

Source: The Rugby Paper

==== Pool B ====
22 November 2024
19:45

(1 BP) Nottingham	29–70	Leicester Tigers (1 BP)
Try: Clayton (2) 7' c, 21' m Wright 52' m S. Green 62' c Graham 78' m Con: Arden (1/2) 8'; Johal (1/3) 63'	Report	Try: Rogerson 25' c Vanes 31' c Allan 37' c Kata 40' c Perese 42' c Whitcombe 45' c Hassell-Collins (2) 54' c, 80' c Ilione 71' c Con: Shillcock (9/9) 26', 32', 38', 40+1', 43', 46', 55', 72'; Whiteley (1/1) 80+1'

Lady Bay Sports Ground
Attendance: 3,690
Referee: Alexander Thomas

23 November 2024
15:00

Coventry	10–19	Northampton Saints
Try: Kvesic 27' m Hutler 50' m	Report	Try: Hendy 13' c Munga 58' c Langdon 64' m Con: Makepeace-Cubitt (2/3) 14', 59'

Butts Park Arena
Attendance: 5,202
Referee: Craig Maxwell-Keys

Source: The Rugby Paper

==== Pool C ====
23 November 2024
15:00

(1 BP) Ealing Trailfinders	36–5	London Scottish
Try: Holgate (2) 5' c, 45' c Cornish 31' m Harris 52' m Wee 59' c Smid 70' m Con: Willis (3/5) 6', 46', 60'	Report	Try: Carr 15' m

Trailfinders Sports Ground
Attendance: 910
Referee: Jonathan Cook

23 November 2024
15:00

Saracens	28–26	Harlequins (2 BP)
Try: Elliott 6' c Sylvester 36' c Hartley 76' m Con: Eden (2/3) 8', 37'; Pen: Eden (3/3) 12', 59', 72'	Report	Try: Walker 4' m T. Green 16' c Anyanwu 53' c Jibulu 80' c Con: Benson (3/4) 17', 54', 80+1'

StoneX Stadium
Attendance: 7,093
Referee: Dan Jones

Source: The Rugby Paper

==== Pool D ====
23 November 2024
15:00

Bedford Blues	7–21	Bath
Try: Maisey 50' c Con: Maisey (1/1) 51'	Report	Try: Barbeary (2) 67' c, 75' c K. Tuipulotu 72' c Con: O. Bailey (3/3) 68', 73', 76'

Goldington Road
Attendance: 2,790
Referee: Harry Walbaum

24 November 2024
15:00

(1 BP) Bristol Bears	40–15	Ampthill
Try: Rowson 13' m Capon 21' c Thomas 29' c Penalty try 33'; Lennon 34' c Boshoff 70' c Con: Worsley (4/5) 22', 30', 35', 71'	Report	Try: Johnston 57' m Barrington 79' c Con: J. Barton (1/2) 80'; Pen: J. Barton (1/1) 12'

Ashton Gate
Attendance: 6,066
Referee: Mike Hudson

Source: The Rugby Paper

==== Pool E ====
22 November 2024
19:45

Gloucester	7–31	Exeter Chiefs (1 BP)
Try: Rapava-Ruskin 63' c Con: Taylor (1/1) 64'	Report	Try: Tuima 4' c Hammersley 12' c Rigg 21' c Hodge 28' m Townsend 30' m Con: Hodge (3/5) 5', 13', 22'

Kingsholm
Attendance: 9,616
Referee: Joe James

23 November 2024
14:30

(1 BP) Hartpury University	41–26	Cornish Pirates (1 BP)
Try: A. Benz-Salomon 30' c Austin 41' c Crane 53' c Holliday 60' c Hayler 70' c Con: Bazalgette (5/5) 31', 42', 54', 61', 70'; Pen: Bazalgette (2/2) 39', 78'	Report	Try: C. Jones 10' c Trewin 13' m Wedlake 22' c Bokenham 63' c Con: I. Jenkins (2/3) 11', 23'; Houston (1/1) 63'

Hartpury Stadium
Attendance: 600
Referee: Charles Gayther

Source: The Rugby Paper

=== Round 4 ===
==== Pool A ====
1 February 2025
14:00

Caldy	14–28	Sale Sharks (1 BP)
Try: Gallagher (2) 47' c, 55' c Con: Barker (2/2) 48', 56'	Report	Try: Wills (2) 11' c, 67' c Davies 38' c J. Bedlow 60' c Con: Curtis (4/4) 12', 39', 61', 68'

Paton Field
Attendance: 1,550
Referee: Jonathan Cook

1 February 2025
14:30

Doncaster Knights	18–42	Newcastle Falcons (1 BP)
Try: Davidson 50' c Veainu 63' m Con: Dolly (1/2) 50'; Pen: Dolly (2/2) 13', 34'	Report	Try: Lockwood 7' c Stevenson 18' c Brown 40' c Pepper 44' c Connon 56' c Rewcastle 72' c Con: Connon (6/6) 7', 18', 40', 44', 56', 72'

Castle Park
Attendance: 1,823
Referee: Richard Gordon

Source: The Rugby Paper

==== Pool B ====
1 February 2024
14:00

(1 BP) Coventry	76–21	Nottingham
Try: Maunder 2' c Hitchcock 14' c, 72' m Tiueti 19' c Martin (3) 31' c, 38' c, 48' m Biggs (2) 57' c, 64' c J. Barton (2) 78' c, 80' c Con: Mathews (9/11) 2', 14', 19', 31', 38', 57', 64', 78', 80'; Pen: Mathews (1/1) 28'	Report	Try: Stapley 7' c Dickinson 25' c Tweedy 60' c Con: Stapley (1/1) 7'; Parks (2/2) 25', 60'

Butts Park Arena
Attendance: 2,232
Referee: Charlie Gayther

1 February 2024
15:00

(1 BP) Leicester Tigers	54–33	Northampton Saints (1 BP)
Try: Ilione 3' c Wand (2) 8' c, 62' m Liebenberg (2) 22' c, 58' c Hatherell 50' c Kata 70' c Radwan 78' c Con: Shillcock (7/8) 3', 9', 23', 50', 58', 70', 78'	Report	Try: Glister 36' m T. James (3) 40' c, 45' c, 55' c Brown 68' c Con: Makepeace-Cubitt (4/5) 40', 45', 55', 68'

Welford Road
Attendance: 20,122
Referee: Jack Makepeace

Source: The Rugby Paper

==== Pool C ====
1 February 2025
14:00

(1 BP) Harlequins	33–14	London Scottish
Try: Musk (2) 25' m, 43' c Hammond 40' c Hobson 48' c Gjaltema 57' c Con: Benson (4/5) 41', 44', 49', 58'	Report	Try: Ferdinand 30' c Lloyd-Seed 74' c Con: Wilstead (2/2) 31', 75'

Twickenham Stoop
Attendance: 5,000
Referee: Andy Wigley

1 February 2025
15:00

(1 BP) Saracens	29–50	Ealing Trailfinders (1 BP)
Try: C. Tuipulotu 14' m Jackson (3) 17' m, 33' c, 79' c Eden 70' m Con: L. Johnson (2/5) 34', 80'	Report	Try: Willemse 4' c Bird-Tulloch (2) 10' c, 72' c T. Wilson (2) 21' m, 26' m Reid 76' c Con: D. Jones (4/6) 5', 11', 74', 77'; Pen: D. Jones (4/4) 1', 48', 54', 62'

StoneX Stadium
Attendance: 6,725
Referee: Dan Jones

Source: The Rugby Paper

==== Pool D ====
1 February 2025
14:00

Ampthill	14–74	Bristol Bears (1 BP)
Try: Cullen 18' c McNulty 75' c Con: J. Barton (2/2) 18', 76'	Report	Try: B. Grondona 6' c D. Bailey (4) 10' c, 16' m, 32' m, 55' c Heward 14' m Marmion 20' m Elizalde (2) 30' c, 46' c Ravouvou 65' c Gwilliam 71' c J. Jenkins 79' m Con: Byrne (2/4) 7', 10'; Elizalde (1/3) 30'; Janse van Rensburg (4/5) 47', 55', 65', 71'

Dillingham Park
Attendance: 1,056
Referee: Jamie Parr

2 February 2025
15:00

(1 BP) Bath	43–26	Bedford Blues (1 BP)
Try: Spandler 10' c Donoghue 17'c Butt (2) 24' c, 37' m Cowan 27' m McConnochie 71' m Le Roux 80' c Con: O. Bailey (4/7) 11', 19', 25', 80'	Report	Try: Worley (2) 31' m, 58' c Conway 35' c Howard 54' c Con: Maisey (3/4) 36', 55', 59'

The Recreation Ground
Attendance: 11,617
Referee: Hamish Grant

Source: The Rugby Paper

==== Pool E ====
31 January 2025
19:30

(1 BP) Cornish Pirates	19–26	Gloucester (1 BP)
Try: Cannon 6' m Hocking 65' c Agbongbon 75' c Con: Houston (2/3) 66', 76'	Report	Try: Eite (2) 3' c, 46' c G. Barton 58' m Butler 61' c Con: G. Barton (3/4) 4', 47', 62'

Mennaye Field
Attendance: 2,779
Referee: Sara Cox

1 February 2025
14:30

Hartpury University	14–36	Exeter Chiefs (1 BP)
Try: Austin 20' c Short 80' c Con: Chamberlain (2/2) 21', 80'	Report	Try: Brown-Bampoe (2) 9' m, 47' m Cairns 14' c Frost 36' c E. Roots 42' m Tua 57' c Con: Skinner (3/6) 14', 37', 58'

Hartpury Stadium
Attendance: 1,000
Referee: Craig Maxwell-Keys

Source: The Rugby Paper

=== Round 5 ===
==== Pool A ====
7 February 2025
19:45

(1 BP) Sale Sharks	19–20	Doncaster Knights
Try: Ma'asi-White 3' c S. Bedlow 54' c Ene 74' m Con: Curtis (2/3) 4', 55'	Report	Try: Veainu 50' c Rokoduguni 69' c Con: Dolly (2/2) 52', 70'; Pen: Dolly (2/2) 37', 72'

Salford Community Stadium
Attendance: 3,529
Referee: Joe James

9 February 2025
15:00

(1 BP) Newcastle Falcons	73–12	Caldy
Try: Blamire (2) 12' c, 31' m Brocklebank 17' c Greenwood (2) 19' c, 50' m Lockwood (2) 41' c, 65' c Doherty 59' c J. Davis (2) 75' c, 80' c Parsons 79' c Con: Connon (4/6) 13', 18', 20', 41'; Wilkinson (5/5) 59', 65', 75', 79', 80'	Report	Try: Robinson 4' m Ellam 63' c Con: Attis (1/1) 63'

Kingston Park
Attendance: 3,625
Referee: Dan Jones

Source: The Rugby Paper

==== Pool B ====
8 February 2025
14:45

(1 BP) Northampton Saints	50–23	Coventry
Try: Kemeny 16' c Scott-Young 29' c Lockett 35' m Seabrook 43' c Pasco 57' c Glister 65' c West 69' c Con: Makepeace-Cubitt (6/7) 16', 30', 44', 58', 66', 70'; Pen: Makepeace-Cubitt (1/1) 54'	Report	Try: Martin 32' c Opoku 50' m Tiueti 72' m Con: Mathews (1/3) 33'; Pen: Mathews (2/2) 26', 39'

Franklin's Gardens
Attendance: 8,775
Referee: Anthony Woodthorpe

8 February 2025
15:00

(1 BP) Leicester Tigers	57–19	Nottingham
Try: Woodward 6' c Volavola 9' m Carnduff (2) 12' c, 71' m Theobald-Thomas 15' c Manz 22' m Whitley 28' c Pearson (2) 73' c, 81' c Con: Volavola (6/9) 7', 13', 16', 29', 74', 82'	Report	Try: Vereti 34' c Roper 48' c Williams 58' m Con: Parks (2/3) 34', 48'

Welford Road
Attendance: 6,702
Referee: Henry Pearson

Source: The Rugby Paper

==== Pool C ====
7 February 2025
19:45

London Scottish	0–20	Saracens
	Report	Try: O. Wilson (2) 39' c, 66' m Tizard 80' m Con: L. Johnson (1/3) 40'; Pen: L. Johnson (1/1) 8'

Athletic Ground
Attendance: 1,013
Referee: Craig Maxwell-Keys

8 February 2025
15:00

Ealing Trailfinders	10–35	Harlequins (1 BP)
Try: Willemse 4' c Con: D. Jones (1/1) 5'; Pen: D. Jones (1/1) 34'	Report	Try: Anderson 1' m Waghorn 10' c Riley 52' c Musk 66' c Con: J. Evans (3/4) 11', 52', 66'; Pen: Benson (2/2) 75', 80'

Trailfinders Sports Ground
Attendance: 4,000 (Note: The Rugby Paper gave a crowd figure of 2,000 for Ealing's home game against Harlequins on 8 February 2025. Reports from supporters at the game suggest that the real attendance was double this, with seating alone fully sold out. Ealing have yet to reply to confirm but the higher figure will be used.)
Referee: George Selwood

Source: The Rugby Paper

==== Pool D ====
7 February 2025
19:45

Bedford Blues	23–14	Bristol Bears
Try: Heffernan 14' m Maisey 27' c Tuilagi 54' m Con: Maisey (1/3) 28'; Pen: Maisey (2/2) 36', 65'	Report	Try: Wolstenholme 33' c Capon 62' c Con: Bazalgette (2/2) 34', 63'

Goldington Road
Attendance: 2,705
Referee: Hamish Smales

8 February 2025
13:30

(1 BP) Bath	50–7	Ampthill
Try: Hennessey 2' c A. Green (2) 6' c, 47' c Spandler (2) 13' c, 57' m Richards 23' m Offiah 60' c Kirk 80' m Con: O. Bailey (3/4) 3', 7', 14'; Donoghue (2/4) 48', 61'	Report	Try: Ijeh 31' c Con: J. Barton (1/1) 32'

The Recreation Ground
Attendance: 7,750
Referee: Mike Hudson

Source: The Rugby Paper

==== Pool E ====
7 February 2025
19:30

Gloucester	7–7	Hartpury University
Try: Allport 61' c Con: G. Barton (1/1) 62'	Report	Try: Crane 27' c Con: Chamberlain (1/1) 28'

Kingsholm
Attendance: 9,059
Referee: Jamie Parr

9 February 2025
15:00

(1 BP) Exeter Chiefs	43–7	Cornish Pirates
Try: Brown-Bampoe (4) 4' m, 53' m, 69' c, 73' c Capstick 34' m Wyatt 42' c E. Roots 58' c Con: Haydon-Wood (4/7) 42', 58', 70', 74'	Report	Try: Georgiou 26' c Con: I. Jenkins (1/1) 26'

Sandy Park
Attendance: 10,212
Referee: Alexander Thomas

Source: The Rugby Paper

=== Round 6 ===
==== Pool A ====
15 February 2025
14:30

(1 BP) Doncaster Knights	48–0	Caldy
Try: Bunting 6' c Smeaton 10' m Holden (2) 32' m, 80' m Rokoduguni (2) 40' c, 46' c Wadsworth 56' m Chapman 68' c Con: Dolly (3/5) 6', 40', 46'; Bunting (1/3) 68'	Report

Castle Park
Attendance: 1,002
Referee: Ian Tempest

16 February 2025
15:00

Sale Sharks	19–17	Newcastle Falcons (1 BP)
Try: McElroy 10' c Rodd 33' c Bamber 80' m Con: Curtis (2/3) 11', 34'	Report	Try: Stuart 15' c Stevenson 35'; Con: Connon (2/2) 16', 36'; Pen: Connon (1/1) 66'

Salford Community Stadium
Attendance: 3,090
Referee: Jack Makepeace

Source: The Rugby Paper

==== Pool B ====
14 February 2025
19:45

(1 BP) Nottingham	33–66	Northampton Saints (1 BP)
Try: S. Green 12' c Graham 20' c Penalty try 48' c Valentine 56' c Threlfall 73' m Con: Arden (2/2) 12', 20'; Threlfall (1/2) 56' c	Report	Try: Savala (3) 19' c, 38' m, 50' c Mapu 24' m Hendy 29' c T. James 35' m Litchfield 44' c Witheat 46' c Seabrook 76' c Benson 79' c Con: Makepeace-Cubitt (8/10) 19', 29', 35', 44', 46', 50', 76', 79'

Lady Bay Sports Ground
Attendance: 2,087
Referee: Sara Cox

15 February 2025
15:00

(1 BP) Coventry	26–68	Leicester Tigers (1 BP)
Try: Hinkley 16' c Morris 45' c Warren 60' c J. Barton 70' m Con: Mathews (1/1) 17'; Mannion (2/3) 46', 61'	Report	Try: Theobald-Thomas 3' c Wand (2) 12' c, 73' m Bassett (2) 27' c, 34'; Ilione 43' c Shillcock 48' c Whiteley 50' c Carnduff 65' c Hatherell 80' c Con: Volavola (2/3) 4', 80'; Shillcock (7/7) 13', 28', 35', 44', 49', 51', 66'

Butts Park Arena
Attendance: 5,250
Referee: Joe James

Source: The Rugby Paper

==== Pool C ====
15 February 2025
15:00

London Scottish	15–35	Ealing Trailfinders (1 BP)
Try: Scott 3' m Holmes 75' c Con: Wilstead (1/1) 76'; Pen: Lloyd-Seed (1/1) 28'	Report	Try: Moore (2) 20', 30'; Montgomery 37' c Hampson 53' c G. Davis 60' c Con: D. Jones (4/4) 21', 31', 38', 54'; Willis (1/1) 61'

Athletic Ground
Attendance: 669
Referee: Karl Dickson

15 February 2025
15:05

(2 BP) Harlequins	29–30	Saracens (1 BP)
Try: W. Jones 9' m Lewies 22' c Dombrandt 30' c T. Green 52' c Con: Halfpenny (2/3) 23', 31'; J. Evans (1/1) 54'; Pen: J. Evans (1/1) 74'	Report	Try: Jackson 12' m Eke 37' m Elliott 46' c J. Bracken 58' c Con: L. Johnson (2/4) 47', 59'; Pen: L. Johnson (2/2) 27', 76'

Twickenham Stoop
Attendance: 9,697
Referee: George Selwood

Source: The Rugby Paper

==== Pool D ====
15 February 2025
14:00

Ampthill	7 – 21	Bedford Blues
Try: Mitchell 61' c Con: J. Barton (1/1) 62'	Report	Try: L. James 8' c Herman 23' c Tuilagi 41' c Con: Maisey (3/3) 9', 24', 42'

Dillingham Park
Attendance: 1,507
Referee: Charlie Gayther

15 February 2025
15:00

(1 BP) Bristol Bears	40–21	Bath
Try: Harding 3' c Naulago 12' c Mata 39' c Byrne 57' c Rowson 69' m Wolstenholme 79' c Con: Byrne (2/2) 4', 13'; Janse van Rensburg (2/3) 40', 58'; Worsley (1/1) 79'	Report	Try: McConnochie 6' c Redpath 14' c Carr-Smith 17' c Con: O. Bailey (3/3) 7', 15', 18'

Ashton Gate
Attendance: 17,317
Referee: Christophe Ridley

Source: The Rugby Paper

==== Pool E ====
15 February 2025
14:30

(1 BP) Cornish Pirates	43–7	Hartpury University
Try: Price-Thomas 2' c C. Jones 5' c Moody (2) 15' m, 42' c Trewin 27' c McCaig 72' c Con: Houston (4/5) 2', 5', 27', 42'; McCaig (1/1) 72'; Pen: Houston (1/1) 21'	Report	Try: Hunt 52'; Con: Chamberlain (1/1) 52'

Mennaye Field
Attendance: 1,005
Referee: Andy Wigley

15 February 2025
15:00

Exeter Chiefs	14–22	Gloucester
Try: Townsend 9' c Hodge 74' c Con: Haydon-Wood (2/2) 10', 74'	Report	Try: Hillman-Cooper 19' c Cotgreave 28' m Penalty try 77'; Con: C. Atkinson (1/2) 19'; Pen: C. Atkinson (1/1) 65'

Sandy Park
Attendance: 10,559
Referee: Harry Walbaum

Source: The Rugby Paper

== Knockout stage ==
The winner from each pool will progress to the quarter-finals, along with the three best runners-up. The top 5 seeds are the group winners based on points – if teams are level, tiebreakers are applied. Seeds 6, 7 and 8 are the best 2nd place teams, based on the same criteria.

Quarter-finals
1	Newcastle	22
8	Gloucester	17
4	Bath	39
5	Harlequins	28
2	Exeter	50
6	Sale	14
3	Northampton	26
7	Ealing	43

Semi-finals
1	Newcastle	29
4	Bath	41
2	Exeter	28
7	Ealing	24

Final
3	Bath	48
2	Exeter Chiefs	14

=== Quarter-finals ===
28 Feb 2025
19:45

Newcastle Falcons	22–17	Gloucester
Try: Blamire (3) 10' m, 52' c, 63' c Con: Connon (2/3) 52', 63'; Pen: Connon (1/1) 14'	Report	Try: Hillman-Cooper 47' c Ward 67' c Con: C. Atkinson (2/2) 47', 67'; Pen: C. Atkinson (1/1) 56'

Kingston Park
Attendance: 2,700
Referee: Luke Pearce

28 Feb 2025
19:45

Bath	39–28	Harlequins
Try: de Glanville 20' c Carr-Smith 38' c Dunn 45' m A. Green 52' c Coetzee 66' m Hennessey 73' m Con: Donoghue (3/6) 21', 38', 53'; Pen: Donoghue (1/1) 63'	Report	Try: T. Green 1' c Joseph 9' c Waghorn 14' c Isgró 22' c Con: J. Evans (4/4) 2', 10', 16', 23'

The Recreation Ground
Attendance: 7,562
Referee: Anthony Woodthorpe

1 Mar 2025
15:00

Exeter Chiefs	50–14	Sale Sharks
Try: Wyatt (2) 7' c, 29' c Hodge 17' c Brown-Bampoe (2) 20' m, 45' c Fisilau 60' c Vermeulen 70' c Con: Hodge (6/7) 8', 18', 30', 46', 61', 72'; Pen: Hodge (1/1) 15'	Report	Try: Reed 11' c Onasanya 80' c Con: Curtis (2/2) 12', 80'

Sandy Park
Attendance: 4,681
Referee: Adam Leal

1 Mar 2025
15:00

Northampton Saints	26–43	Ealing Trailfinders
Try: Hendy 9' c Ramm (3) 13' c, 25' m, 74' c Con: Hutchinson (3/4) 10', 14', 74'	Report	Try: Zigiriadis 1' c Collins (2) 3' m, 41' c G. Davis 29' c Bird-Tulloch 34' c Kernohan 48' c Con: T. Wilson (1/1) 2'; D. Jones (4/5) 30', 36', 42', 49'; Pen: D. Jones (1/1) 24'

Franklin's Gardens
Attendance: 6,442
Referee: Sara Cox

Source: The Rugby Paper

=== Semi-finals ===
7 March 2025
19:45

Newcastle Falcons	29–41	Bath
Try: Hearle 6' m McCallum 38' c Stevenson (2) 44' c, 50' c Con: Connon (3/4) 39', 45', 50'; Pen: Connon (1/1) 17'	Report	Try: Staddon (2) 20' c, 72' m Barbeary 27' m Emens (2) 34' c, 57' c Hennessey 67' c Con: Donoghue (4/6) 20', 34', 57', 67'; Pen: Donoghue (1/1) 77'

Kingston Park
Attendance: 4,502
Referee: George Selwood

8 March 2025
12:15

Exeter Chiefs	28–24	Ealing Trailfinders
Try: Hodge 25' c Penalty try 33'; Roots 62' c Wyatt 69' c Con: Hodge (3/3) 26', 63', 70'	Report	Try: Hampson 22' c Bird-Tulloch 44' c Cornish 56' c Con: Worboys (1/1) 23'; Willis (2/2) 45', 57'; Pen: Worboys (1/1) 8'

Sandy Park
Attendance: 3,960
Referee: Joe James

Source: The Rugby Paper

=== Final ===
16 March 2025
12:00

Exeter Chiefs	14–48	Bath
Try: Tshiunza 21' c Sio 33' c Con: Hodge (2/2) 21', 34'	Report	Try: Carr-Smith 21' c Cokanasiga 26' c Du Toit 45' c Dunn (2) 58' c, 68' c Schreuder 74' m Con: Donoghue (5/6) 22', 27', 46', 59', 68'; Pen: Donoghue (1/1) 40'

Sandy Park
Attendance: 11,182
Referee: Sara Cox

Source: The Rugby Paper

== Attendances ==
Club	Home matches	Total	Average	Highest	Lowest	% Capacity
Ampthill	3	4,549	1,516	1,986	1,056	51%
Bath	4	37,029	9,257	11,617	7,562	64%
Bedford Blues	3	9,340	3,113	3,845	2,705	62%
Bristol Bears	3	29,689	9,896	17,317	6,066	37%
Caldy	3	3,445	1,148	1,550	525	29%
Cornish Pirates	3	6,484	2,161	2,779	1,005	54%
Coventry	3	12,684	4,228	5,250	2,232	81%
Doncaster Knights	3	5,233	1,744	2,408	1,002	34%
Ealing Trailfinders	3	7,138	2,379	4,000	910	48%
Exeter Chiefs	6	49,039	8,173	11,182	3,960	52%
Gloucester	3	27,069	9,023	9,616	8,394	56%
Harlequins	3	19,013	6,338	9,697	4,316	43%
Hartpury University	3	3,343	1,114	1,743	600	56%
Leicester Tigers	3	42,024	14,008	20,122	6,702	54%
London Scottish	3	2,503	834	1,013	669	19%
Newcastle Falcons	5	18,544	3,709	4,502	2,700	36%
Northampton Saints	4	37,588	9,397	15,249	6,442	62%
Nottingham	3	6,996	2,332	3,690	1,219	63%
Sale Sharks	3	11,246	3,749	4,627	3,090	31%
Saracens	3	15,868	5,289	7,093	2,050	50%

Source: The Rugby Paper

== Individual statistics ==
=== Top points scorers ===
As of 16 March 2025

Rank	Player	Club	Points
1	(England) Josh Hodge	Exeter	103
2	(Ireland) Brett Connon	Newcastle	75
3	(England) Paul Brown-Bampoe	Exeter	55
3	(Ireland) Ciaran Donoghue	Bath	55
3	(England) George Makepeace-Cubitt	Northampton	55
4	(England) Jamie Shillcock	Leicester	53
5	(Wales) Dan Jones	Ealing	52
6	(England) Orlando Bailey	Bath	50
7	(England) Will Maisey	Bedford	47
8	(England) Jamie Benson	Harlequins	46
8	(England) Tom Curtis	Sale	46

Source: The Rugby Paper

=== Top try scorers ===
As of 16 March 2025

Rank	Player	Club	Tries
1	(England) Paul Brown-Bampoe	Exeter	11
2	(England) Josh Hodge	Exeter	8
2	(England) Brandon Jackson	Saracens	8
3	(England) Reuben Bird-Tulloch	Ealing	6
3	(England) Jamie Blamire	Newcastle	6
3	(England) Obi Ene	Sale	6
3	(England) James Hadfield	Saracens	6
3	(Wales) Louie Hennessey	Bath	6
3	(England) Ruaridh McConnochie	Bath	6
3	(Ireland) Tadgh McElroy	Sale	6
3	(England) Will Wand	Leicester	6

Source: The Rugby Paper

== Discipline ==
=== Citings/bans ===
Player/Coach	Match (Note: The cited player's club is listed in bold italics.)	Citing date	Law breached	Result	Ref
(England) Aman Johal	**Nottingham** vs. Coventry	5 November 2024	9.13 – Dangerous Tackling (Red card)	3-match ban (Note: The ban is reduced by one match, subject to the player's completion of the World Rugby Coaching Intervention Programme.)	
(South Africa) Kyle Whyte	Harlequins vs. **Ealing**	12 November 2024	9.13 – Dangerous Tackling (Citing)	3-match ban	
(England) Josh Iosefa-Scott	**Exeter** vs. Hartpury	13 November 2024	9.12 – Punch/Strike (Citing)	3-match ban	
(Wales) Ioan Rhys Davies	Harlequins vs. **London Scottish**	4 February 2025	9.20(b) – Dangerous Play in a Ruck (Citing)	2-match ban	
(England) Matt Wilkinson	Harlequins vs. **London Scottish**	4 February 2025	9.13 – Dangerous Tackling (Citing)	5-match ban	
(Tonga) Sione Vaenuku	**Ampthill** vs. Bristol	6 February 2025	9.13 – Dangerous Tackling (Citing)	3-match ban	
(England) Harvey Skinner	Hartpury vs. **Exeter**	6 February 2025	9.18 – Tip Tackle (Citing)	3-match ban	
(Samoa) Iakopo Mapu	**Northampton** vs. Ealing	4 March 2025	9.13 – Dangerous Tackling (Red card)	3-match ban	

== See also ==
- 2024–25 Premiership Rugby
- 2024–25 RFU Championship
