= List of 2024–25 Premiership Rugby transfers =

This is a list of player transfers involving Premiership Rugby teams before or during the 2024–25 season.

The list consists of deals that have been confirmed, and are for players who are moving either from or to a rugby union team which competed in the Premiership during the 2023–24 season. The winner of the 2023–24 RFU Championship, Ealing Trailfinders, are not included on the list, after failing to meet the minimum standards criteria to qualify for promotion to the Premiership.

It is not unknown for confirmed deals to be cancelled at a later date.

== Bath ==
=== Players in ===
- (Ireland) Ross Molony from (Ireland) Leinster
- (South Africa) Francois van Wyk from (England) Leicester Tigers
- (England) Guy Pepper from (England) Newcastle Falcons
- (England) Austin Emens from (United Kingdom) Great Britain Sevens
- (England) Charlie Griffin from (England) Saracens
- (Wales) Jack Woods from (Wales) Dragons

=== Players out ===
- (Italy) Matt Gallagher to (Italy) Benetton
- (Wales) Steffan Emanuel to (Wales) Cardiff
- (South Africa) Johannes Jonker to (France) Grenoble
- (England) Rory Cameron (released)
- (England) Gabe Goss (released)
- (England) Byron Lloyd-Gilmour (released)
- (Scotland) Murdoch Lock (released)
- (England) JJ Tonks (released)
- (England) Max Wright (released)
- (South Africa) Chris Cloete (retired)
- (South Africa) GJ van Velze (retired)
- (England) George Worboys to (England) Ealing Trailfinders
- (England) Nahum Merigan to (France) Périgueux
- (South Africa) Juan Schoeman to (South Africa) Lions
- (England) Josh McNally to (Wales) Cardiff
- (England) Elliott Stooke to (Japan) Red Hurricanes Osaka
- (South Africa) Brendan Owen to (Japan) Yokohama Canon Eagles
- (South Africa) Daniel Marais to (England) Camborne
- (England) Arthur Green to (England) Doncaster Knights (season-long loan)
- (England) Will Parry to (England) Doncaster Knights (season-long loan)
- (South Africa) Jacques du Plessis (released)
- (Wales) Louie Hennessey to (Wales) Cardiff (short-term loan)
- (Wales) Regan Grace to (Wales) Cardiff

== Bristol Bears ==
=== Players in ===
- (Fiji) Viliame Mata from (Scotland) Edinburgh
- (England) Kofi Cripps from (England) Clifton
- (Zimbabwe) Lovejoy Chawatama from (England) Harlequins
- (Wales) Sam Scott from (England) Midlands Central Academy
- (England) Ethan Surrey from (England) Midlands Central Academy
- (England) Steele Barker from (England) Cornish Pirates
- (England) Tom Doughty from (England) Doncaster Knights
- (England) Sam Edwards from (England) Leicester Tigers
- (England) Jacob Cusick from (England) Leicester Tigers
- (Argentina) Benjamín Elizalde from (Argentina) Deportiva Francesa
- (United States) Toby Fricker from (United States) New England Free Jacks (short-term loan)
- (England) Ed Timpson from (Australia) Northern Suburbs (short-term loan)
- (Scotland) Jamie Hodgson from (Scotland) Edinburgh (short-term loan)
- (Argentina) Pedro Rubiolo from (England) Newcastle Falcons (season-long loan)
- (Ireland) Harry Byrne from (Ireland) Leinster (short-term loan)
- (England) Harry Bazalgette from (England) Hartpury University (short-term loan)

=== Players out ===
- (Wales) Callum Sheedy to (Wales) Cardiff
- (Wales) Tom Bowen to (Wales) Cardiff
- (England) Kyle Sinckler to (France) Toulon
- (Scotland) Magnus Bradbury to (Scotland) Edinburgh
- (England) Piers O'Conor to (Ireland) Connacht
- (England) Harry Ascherl (released)
- (England) Matty Jones (released)
- (England) Tom Sims (released)
- (England) Fred Davies to (England) Doncaster Knights
- (Wales) Oscar Lennon to (United States) New England Free Jacks
- (Wales) Dan Thomas to (Wales) Cardiff
- (France) Virimi Vakatawa (released)
- (England) Isaac Campbell-Wu (released)
- (England) Tom Gardner (released)
- (England) Tom Ormsby (released)
- (England) Dylan Power (released)
- (England) Ollie Thraves (released)
- (Samoa) Chris Vui (released)
- (England) Andrew Turner to (England) Doncaster Knights (season-long loan)
- (Spain) Jono Benz-Salomon to (England) Hartpury University
- (Spain) Toti Benz-Salomon to (England) Hartpury University
- (England) Charlie Rice to (England) Cornish Pirates
- (England) Ed Holmes to (Japan) Shimizu Koto Blue Sharks
- (England) Charlie Powell to (New Zealand) Southland
- (England) Jay Tyack to (England) Cornish Pirates
- (England) Macenzzie Duncan to (Scotland) Glasgow Warriors
- (England) Ed Timpson to (United States) RFC Los Angeles

== Exeter Chiefs ==
=== Players in ===
- (New Zealand) Jimmy Roots from (England) Ealing Trailfinders
- (England) Will Goodrick-Clarke from (England) Ealing Trailfinders
- (New Zealand) Tamati Tua from (Australia) Brumbies
- (South Africa) Kwenzo Blose from (South Africa) Stormers
- (Argentina) Franco Molina from (Argentina) Dogos
- (Ireland) Martin Moloney from (Ireland) Leinster
- (South Africa) Ethan Burger from (South Africa) Tuks

=== Players out ===
- (Namibia) Patrick Schickerling to (Scotland) Glasgow Warriors
- (South Africa) Aidon Davis to (South Africa) Cheetahs
- (Scotland) Alec Hepburn to (Wales) Scarlets
- (England) Danny Southworth to (Wales) Cardiff
- (Wales) Oli Burrows to (Wales) Dragons
- (Scotland) Fin Richardson to (Scotland) Glasgow Warriors
- (England) Cory Teague to (England) Doncaster Knights
- (England) Harry Hocking to (England) Cornish Pirates
- (England) Matt Postlethwaite (retired)
- (Wales) Iestyn Harris (retired)
- (England) James Kenny to (England) Ealing Trailfinders
- (England) Ben Grubb (released)
- (England) Jacob Morris (released)
- (England) Arthur Relton to (England) Cornish Pirates
- (Georgia (country)) Nika Abuladze to (France) Montpellier
- (England) Jeremy Tuima to (France) Provence
- (England) Billy Keast to (England) Cornish Pirates (season-long loan)
- (Scotland) Jamie Stewart to (Scotland) Edinburgh
- (Ireland) Eoin O'Connor to (England) Cornish Pirates (season-long loan)
- (England) Joe Snow to (England) Taunton Titans
- (England) Ollie Devoto to (United States) Chicago Hounds
- (England) Toby Clinch to (Wales) Cardiff Metropolitan University
- (Ireland) Martin Moloney to (England) Cornish Pirates (short-term loan)
- (England) Sam Maunder to (England) Coventry (season-long loan)
- (England) Lucas Dorrell to (England) Cornish Pirates (season-long loan)
- (England) Louie Sinclair to (England) Cornish Pirates (short-term loan)

== Gloucester ==
=== Players in ===
- (Wales) Tomos Williams from (Wales) Cardiff
- (Wales) Gareth Anscombe (unattached)
- (England) Christian Wade from (France) Racing 92
- (England) Alfie Petch from (France) Biarritz
- (England) Seb Blake (promoted from Academy)
- (England) Arthur Clark (promoted from Academy)
- (Wales) Freddie Thomas (promoted from Academy)
- (England) Harry Taylor (promoted from Academy)
- (England) Louis Hillman-Cooper (promoted from Academy)
- (England) Jacob Morris (promoted from Academy)
- (England) George Alexander from (England) Midlands Central Academy
- (Wales) Deian Gwynne from (Wales) Scarlets
- (England) George Knowles from (England) Midlands West Academy
- (Wales) Morgan Nelson from (England) Cornish Pirates
- (England) Harry Gipson from (England) Hartpury University (short-term loan)
- (England) Max Knight from (England) Hartpury University (short-term loan)
- (England) Tom Penny from (England) Newcastle Falcons (short-term loan)
- (England) Will Butler from (New Zealand) Tasman
- (England) Mike Austin from (England) Hartpury University (short-term loan)
- (England) Freddie Stevens from (England) Hartpury University (short-term loan)

=== Players out ===
- (England) Alex Hearle to (England) Newcastle Falcons
- (Scotland) Adam Hastings to (Scotland) Glasgow Warriors
- (Argentina) Santiago Socino to (France) Agen
- (England) Harry Elrington (retired)
- (England) Will Gilderson (released)
- (England) Rob Nixon (released)
- (England) Jonny May to (France) Soyaux Angoulême
- (England) Fraser Balmain to (England) Saracens
- (England) Reece Dunn (released)
- (England) Michael Dykes (released)
- (England) Ethan Hunt to (England) Hartpury University
- (England) Fred Ma'a (released)
- (England) Tom Miles (released)
- (England) Tom Riman (released)
- (England) Alex Seville (released)
- (England) Naquan Smith (released)
- (England) Tom Worts (released)
- (England) Lloyd Evans to (Wales) Dragons
- (England) Solomon Shand to (France) Montpellier
- (England) Jack Hopson to (France) Valence Romans
- (England) Matty Jones to (England) Cambridge
- (Italy) Stephen Varney to (France) Vannes
- Jack Reeves to (United States) New England Free Jacks
- (England) Alfie Petch to (England) Cornish Pirates (short-term loan)
- (England) George McGuigan to (Wales) Ospreys

== Harlequins ==
=== Players in ===
- (Samoa) Titi Lamositele from (France) Montpellier
- (Wales) Leigh Halfpenny from (New Zealand) Crusaders
- (Wales) Wyn Jones from (Wales) Scarlets
- Rodrigo Isgró from Argentina Sevens
- (England) Jonny Law from (England) London Scottish (short-term loan)

=== Players out ===
- (Italy) Louis Lynagh to (Italy) Benetton
- (South Africa) André Esterhuizen to (South Africa) Sharks
- (Zimbabwe) Lovejoy Chawatama to (England) Bristol Bears
- (Argentina) Santiago García Botta (retired)
- (England) Will Collier to (France) Castres
- (United States) Makeen Alikhan (released)
- (England) Theo Currie (released)
- (England) Will Edwards (released)
- (England) Jonny Smith (released)
- (England) Matas Jurevicius to (England) Ealing Trailfinders
- (England) Max Green to (France) Périgueux
- (England) Joe Marler (retired)
- (Australia) Tom Osborne to (Australia) Western Force

== Leicester Tigers ==
=== Players in ===
- (Wales) Nicky Smith from (Wales) Ospreys
- (Australia) Izaia Perese from (Australia) NSW Waratahs
- (England) Finn Carnduff (promoted from Academy)
- (England) Tim Hoyt (promoted from Academy)
- (England) Emeka Ilione (promoted from Academy)
- (England) Tom Manz (promoted from Academy)
- (England) Archie Vanes (promoted from Academy)
- (England) Joseph Woodward (promoted from Academy)
- (England) George Pearson from (England) Midlands Central Academy
- (England) Will Wand from (England) Coventry
- (Fiji) Ben Volavola from (France) Agen
- (France) Côme Joussain from (England) Nottingham
- (Australia) Jed Holloway from (Australia) NSW Waratahs (short-term loan)
- (England) Adam Radwan from (England) Newcastle Falcons
- (Sweden) Ale Loman from (England) Nottingham (short-term loan)

=== Players out ===
- (South Africa) Jasper Wiese to (Japan) Urayasu D-Rocks
- (England) Phil Cokanasiga to (Wales) Ospreys
- (South Africa) Francois van Wyk to (England) Bath
- (England) Nic Dolly to (Australia) Western Force
- (England) Sam Edwards to (England) Bristol Bears
- (England) Morgan Meredith (released)
- (England) Kieran Wilkinson to (England) Newcastle Falcons
- (England) Dan Richardson to (England) Nottingham
- (England) Ollie Crane to (England) Leicester Lions
- (England) Jacob Cusick to (England) Bristol Bears
- (England) Guy Porter (retired)
- (Scotland) Matt Scott to (Scotland) Edinburgh
- (England) Henry Nanka-Bruce to (England) Northampton Saints
- (Fiji) Simon Koroiyadi to (Italy) Benetton
- (Australia) Jed Holloway to (United States) San Diego Legion
- (England) Harry Simmons (retired)
- (England) Anthony Watson (retired)
- (England) Lewis Chessum to (Japan) Mitsubishi DynaBoars (season-long loan)

== Newcastle Falcons ==
=== Players in ===
- (England) Alex Hearle from (England) Gloucester
- (South Africa) Luan de Bruin from (Scotland) Edinburgh
- (England) Marcus Tiffen (promoted from Academy)
- (England) Cameron Neild from (England) Sale Sharks
- (England) Callum Hancock from (England) Leeds Beckett University
- (England) Connor Hancock from (England) Leeds Beckett University
- (England) Kieran Wilkinson from (England) Leicester Tigers
- (England) Connor Doherty from (England) Sale Sharks (season-long loan)
- (England) Jack Metcalf from (England) Doncaster Knights
- (Scotland) Thomas Gordon from (Scotland) Glasgow Warriors
- (Ireland) Sammy Arnold from (France) Brive
- (England) Ethan Grayson from (United States) San Diego Legion (short-term loan)
- (England) Cameron Ellis from (England) Newcastle University
- (England) Oscar Stott from (England) Durham University
- (Scotland) Harrison Wood from (Scotland) Edinburgh
- (England) Max Clark from (England) Saracens (short-term loan)
- (England) Oscar Usher from (England) University of Northumbria

=== Players out ===
- (England) Phil Brantingham to (England) Saracens
- (England) Louie Johnson to (England) Saracens
- (England) Guy Pepper to (England) Bath
- (England) Iwan Stephens to (Wales) Cardiff
- (England) Mark Dormer (released)
- (England) Mark Tampin (retired)
- (Fiji) George Wacokecoke to (England) Doncaster Knights
- (Wales) Sam Cross to (France) Tarbes
- (England) Josh Barton to (England) Coventry
- (Ireland) Zach Kerr to (England) Doncaster Knights
- (England) Sam Clark to (England) Ealing Trailfinders
- (Wales) Josh Thomas to (Wales) Cardiff RFC
- (England) Rory Jennings to (Wales) Cardiff
- (England) Charlie Maddison (retired)
- (Fiji) Vereimi Qorowale to (England) Ampthill
- (South Africa) Michael van Vuuren to (England) Alnwick
- (England) Tom Penny to (England) Gloucester
- (Argentina) Pedro Rubiolo to (England) Bristol Bears (season-long loan)
- (Argentina) Matías Moroni to (France) Brive
- (England) Adam Radwan to (England) Leicester Tigers

== Northampton Saints ==
=== Players in ===
- (England) Tom Lockett (promoted from Academy)
- (Australia) Josh Kemeny from (Australia) Melbourne Rebels
- (England) Tom Litchfield (promoted from Academy)
- (England) Archie Benson from (England) Luctonians
- (England) Fyn Brown from (England) Doncaster Knights
- (England) Luke Green from (United States) San Diego Legion
- (England) Tom West from (England) Saracens
- (England) George Makepeace-Cubitt from (England) Rams
- (England) George Smith from (England) Coventry
- (Scotland) Callum Hunter-Hill from (England) Saracens
- (England) Nathan Langdon from (England) Loughborough Students
- (England) Henry Nanka-Bruce from (England) Leicester Tigers
- (England) Will Spencer from (France) Soyaux Angoulême (short-term loan)
- (Ireland) Gavin Thornbury from (Ireland) Connacht (short-term loan)
- (Fiji) Mitieli Vulikijapani from (England) Hull (short-term loan)
- (Samoa) Iakopo Mapu from (New Zealand) Moana Pasifika
- (England) Henry Walker from (England) Ealing Trailfinders
- (Australia) Charlie Ulcoq from (Australia) NSW Waratahs

=== Players out ===
- (England) Alex Moon to (France) Bayonne
- (England) Gabriel Hamer-Webb to (Wales) Cardiff
- (England) Courtney Lawes to (France) Brive
- (England) Alex Waller (retired)
- (England) Ethan Waller (retired)
- (England) Lewis Ludlam to (France) Toulon
- (England) Paul Hill to (Scotland) Edinburgh
- (England) Tom Cruse (retired)
- (England) Aston Gradwick-Light (released)
- (South Africa) Nick Tarr (released)
- (England) Geordie Irvine to (England) Ealing Trailfinders
- (England) Matthew Arden to (England) Nottingham
- (England) Kayde Sylvester to (England) Cambridge
- (England) Will Cotterill to (France) Oyonnax
- (Fiji) Sam Matavesi to (France) Lyon
- (England) Joel Matavesi to (England) Bedford Blues
- (Italy) Callum Braley to (England) Saracens
- (England) George Patten to (England) Hinckley
- (Ireland) Gavin Thornbury to (United States) Utah Warriors
- (England) Will Spencer to (Wales) Ospreys
- (England) George Smith to (France) Nevers

== Sale Sharks ==
=== Players in ===
- (South Africa) Le Roux Roets from (South Africa) Sharks
- (Fiji) Waisea Nayacalevu from (France) Toulon
- (Ireland) Will Addison from (Ireland) Ulster
- (England) Joe Bedlow returned from (England) Doncaster Knights
- (Ireland) Tadgh McElroy from (Ireland) Ulster

=== Players out ===
- (South Africa) Cobus Wiese to (South Africa) Bulls
- (England) Manu Tuilagi to (France) Bayonne
- (England) Cameron Neild to (England) Newcastle Falcons
- (England) Connor Doherty to (England) Newcastle Falcons (season-long loan)
- (England) Tom Ellis (released)
- (England) Callum Ford (released)
- (England) Ewan Murphy (released)
- (England) Finn Rogers (released)
- (England) Sam James to (France) Racing 92
- (Wales) William Phillips to (France) Toulouse
- (Tonga) Telusa Veainu to (England) Doncaster Knights
- (Argentina) Agustín Creevy to (Italy) Benetton
- (Fiji) Waisea Nayacalevu to (Wales) Ospreys
- (South Africa) Nick Schonert (released)

== Saracens ==
=== Players in ===
- (England) Phil Brantingham from (England) Newcastle Falcons
- (Wales) Rhys Carré from (Wales) Cardiff
- (New Zealand) Fergus Burke from (New Zealand) Crusaders
- (England) Louie Johnson from (England) Newcastle Falcons
- (England) Sam Spink from (Australia) Western Force
- (England) Fraser Balmain from (England) Gloucester
- (England) Reggie Hammick from (England) London & South Central Academy
- (England) Harry Wilson from (England) Doncaster Knights
- (Italy) Callum Braley from (England) Northampton Saints (short-term loan)
- (England) Charlie Bracken (promoted from Academy)
- (England) Tobias Elliott (promoted from Academy)
- (England) Brandon Jackson (promoted from Academy)
- (England) Max Clark from (Wales) Dragons (short-term loan)
- (South Africa) Tim Swiel (unattached)
- (South Africa) Luke Davidson from (South Africa) Michaelhouse
- (Samoa) Izaiha Moore-Aiono from (England) Ampthill (short-term loan)
- (Wales) Liam Williams from (Japan) Kubota Spears
- (England) Tiff Eden from (Italy) Zebre Parma (short-term loan)
- (Wales) Carwyn Tuipulotu from (Wales) Scarlets (short-term loan)
- (Ireland) Eoghan Clarke from (Ireland) Munster

=== Players out ===
- (England) Owen Farrell to (France) Racing 92
- (England) Christian Judge to (France) Béziers
- (England) Alex Lewington (retired)
- (England) Charlie Griffin to (England) Bath
- (England) Tom West to (England) Northampton Saints
- (Samoa) Sam Asotasi (released)
- (England) Luca Fahy (released)
- (England) Anthony Mark (released)
- (England) Jenson McInulty (released)
- (England) Ralph Adams-Hale (retired)
- (England) Cameron Boon (retired)
- (England) Dom Morris (retired)
- (Scotland) Sean Maitland (retired)
- (England) Ben Harris to (England) Ealing Trailfinders
- (England) Jevaughn Warren to (England) Coventry
- (England) Jasper McGuire to (England) Doncaster Knights
- (England) Francis Moore to (England) Ealing Trailfinders
- (Samoa) Logovi'i Mulipola to (England) Doncaster Knights
- (England) Ollie Stonham to (Japan) Kubota Spears
- (Scotland) Callum Hunter-Hill to (England) Northampton Saints
- (England) Harry Legg to (England) Plymouth Albion
- (England) Mako Vunipola to (France) Vannes
- (England) Finn Newton to (France) Toulon
- (England) Alex Wardell to (England) London Scottish
- (England) Billy Vunipola to (France) Montpellier
- (Wales) Aled Davies to (Wales) Cardiff
- (England) Manu Vunipola to (Japan) Mie Honda Heat
- (South Africa) Tim Swiel to (United States) Chicago Hounds
- (Samoa) Izaiha Moore-Aiono to (France) Castres
- (England) Max Clark to (England) Newcastle Falcons
- (England) Tom Parton to (Japan) Saitama Wild Knights
- (United States) Kapeli Pifeleti to (France) Provence
- (Italy) Callum Braley to (Wales) Cardiff
- (England) Sam Crean to (Ireland) Ulster (short-term loan)

== See also ==
- List of 2024–25 United Rugby Championship transfers
- List of 2024–25 RFU Championship transfers
- List of 2024–25 Super Rugby transfers
- List of 2024–25 Top 14 transfers
- List of 2024–25 Rugby Pro D2 transfers
- List of 2024–25 Major League Rugby transfers
