= Paul Brown-Bampoe =

English rugby union player

- Born: 15 May 2002 (age 24) Croydon, England
- Height: 1.90 m (6 ft 3 in)
- Weight: 98 kg (216 lb; 15 st 6 lb)
- University: Durham University

Rugby union career
- Position: Wing
- Current team: Exeter Chiefs
Senior career
Years	Team	Apps	(Points)
2024-	Exeter Chiefs	23	(105)
2024	→ Plymouth Albion (loan)	5	
- Correct as of 18 January 2025

Paul Brown-Bampoe (born 15 May 2002) is an English professional rugby union footballer who plays on the wing for Premiership Rugby club Exeter Chiefs.

== Career ==
Brown-Bampoe played British Universities and Colleges Sport (BUCS) rugby union whilst studying at Durham University, during which he was called up to the England rugby sevens team in 2022. He joined Exeter Chiefs during the 2023-24 season after impressing in BUCS rugby. He spent time on loan that season with National League 1 side Plymouth Albion.

In August 2024, he scored a hat-trick of tries for Exeter in a pre-season friendly match against local rivals Cornish Pirates. He also scored in pre-season matches against Ospreys and Ulster Rugby, leading to Exeter head coach Rob Baxter to suggest he was ready for a senior league debut for the club. He made his Rugby Premiership debut for Exeter on 21 September 2024 against Leicester Tigers. He rejoined Plymouth Albion in the English National League One on a short-term loan deal in December 2024.

He ran in a try from 95-metres on his Exeter Chiefs European Rugby Champions Cup debut against Union Bordeaux Bègles on 11 January 2025. In February 2025, he scored four tries in a 43-7 win over Cornish Pirates in the Premiership Rugby Cup. In March 2025, he played in the final of that competition as Bath Rugby beat Exeter Chiefs 48-14 to win the 2024-25 Premiership Rugby Cup. The following month, he scored two tries as Exeter launched a second half comeback to narrowly lose 24-26 to runaway league leaders Bath on 19 April 2025.

== Style of play ==
He is described as a powerful and pacy winger.

== Personal life ==
Brown-Bampoe was born in Croydon and is of Ghanaian descent. He attended Reed's School in Surrey, where he was head boy. He gained a master's degree in finance having previously completed a BA in mechanical engineering.
