= Sam Wolstenholme =

Sam Wolstenholme may refer to:

- Sam Wolstenholme (footballer)
- Sam Wolstenholme (rugby union)
