= Ethan Staddon =

English rugby union player

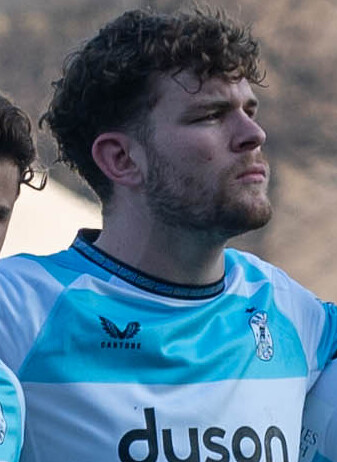
- Born: 3 July 2002 (age 24) Dorchester, Dorset, England
- Height: 1.95 m (6 ft 5 in)
- Weight: 110 kg (243 lb)
- School: Beechen Cliff School
- University: University of Bath

Rugby union career
- Position: Flanker
- Current team: Bath
Senior career
Years	Team	Apps	(Points)
2020–	Bath	42	(40)
International career
Years	Team	Apps	(Points)
2019	England U18		
2022	England U20		

Ethan Staddon (born 3 July 2002) is an English professional rugby union footballer who plays in the back row for Bath Rugby.

== Early life ==
Born in Dorchester, Dorset, Staddon played rugby union for Bridport RFC from under-8 level, playing with them through the age-groups prior to moving to Dorchester RFC U14s. He captained Dorchester RFC in the under-16 age group. He attended Beechen Cliff School in Bath.

== Club career ==
In December 2020, he became the youngest player to make a Rugby Premiership appearance for Bath when he featured as an 18 year-old in a 33-17 victory over Worcester Warriors. The following season he played for Bath in the Premiership Rugby Cup but also suffered a knee injury that ruled him out of action. In 2023, he also required ankle surgery that restricted his game time after suffering an injury in training.

In April 2024, he signed a new one-year contract with the club. He was named in the Bath starting XV for his European Rugby Champions Cup debut against Benetton Rugby on 15 December 2024. He signed a contract extension with Bath in February 2025. On 16 March 2025, he played in the final as Bath beat Exeter Chiefs 48-14 to win the 2024-25 Premiership Rugby Cup.

== International career ==
He represented the England at U18 and U20 level.

== Personal life ==
He attended the University of Bath where he studied natural sciences.
