= Tom Wyatt (rugby union) =

English rugby union player

- Full name: Tom Wyatt
- Born: 14 December 1999 (age 26) Taunton, England
- Height: 185 cm (6 ft 1 in)
- Weight: 89 kg (196 lb; 14 st 0 lb)
- School: Taunton School

Rugby union career
- Position(s): Centre, Winger, Fullback
- Current team: Exeter Chiefs (dual-registered with Cornish Pirates)
Youth career
- 20??-2018: Minehead Barbarians RFC
Senior career
Years	Team	Apps	(Points)
2018-2019	North Petherton RFC	18	(0)
2019-	Exeter Chiefs	36	(45)
2019-2020	→ Taunton (loan)	12	(20)
2020-	→ Cornish Pirates (loan)	38	(30)
2018-	Total	104	(95)
- Correct as of 29 March 2024

Tom Wyatt (born 14 December 1999) is an English rugby union player who plays as a centre and outside back for Exeter Chiefs, as well as featuring for the Cornish Pirates on dual registration.

== Club career ==
He played junior rugby at Minehead Barbarians RFC, at 16 he had trials at Bath however he was dismissed being described as "too small".

One of his coaches at Taunton School, former Exeter Chiefs player Nic Sestaret, helped get Wyatt down to Level 8 side North Petherton RFC. With help from Sestaret, Wyatt was invited to play in representative games as part of Exeter's outreach programme. Joining the senior academy in 2019.

He made a couple of appearances for the Exeter Chiefs Braves side before makings his full debut for the club on 21 September 2019, starting at outside centre in a 28-14 win over Bath in the Premiership Rugby Cup. Wyatt opening the scoring of the match with a try in the 18th minute.

In the 2019-20 season, he joined Taunton RFC on loan helping the side win the National League 2 South. He joined the Cornish Pirates on dual registration in 2020.

== Honours ==
Exeter Chiefs

- Premiership: 2019/20 (champions)

Taunton RFC

- National League 2 South: 2019/20 (champions)
