= Jasper Spandler =

English rugby union player (born 2003)

- Born: 21 May 2003 (age 23) Colchester, England
- Height: 1.78 m (5 ft 10 in)
- Weight: 105 kg (16 st 7 lb; 231 lb)
- School: Warminster School
- University: University of Bath

Rugby union career
- Position: Hooker
- Current team: Bath
Senior career
Years	Team	Apps	(Points)
2022–	Bath	19	(30)
2025	→ Worcester Warriors (loan)	10	(15)

Jasper Spandler (born 21 May 2003) is an English professional rugby union footballer who plays as a Hooker for Bath Rugby.

== Early life ==
From Wiltshire, he attended Warminster School and the University of Bath where he studied International Development with Economics. He represented England at the under-18 level and England-U20 level, gaining international experience while still a teenager. During the 2022-23 season, he played for University of Bath in the BUCS Super Rugby competition, and emerged as the league’s leading try-scorer with 15 tries, an unusually prolific tally for a front-row forward. He was also called-up for the England Students team in 2023.

== Career ==
He joined the Senior academy at Bath Rugby in June 2021. He made his senior Bath Rugby debut against Worcester Warriors in 2022 in the Premiership Rugby Cup.

He featured for Bath in the Premiership Rugby Cup during the 2024-25 season, scoring a brace of tries in a 73-0 win against Ampthill RUFC in November 2024. He was also a try scorer in that competition in Bath's win over Bedford Blues. In January 2025, he score four tries in a friendly match for Bath United against England U20.

In March 2025, he started the final as Bath beat Exeter Chiefs 48-14 to win the 2024-25 Premiership Rugby Cup. In May 2025, he had his contract extended by Bath.

In October 2025, he joined the newly-reformed Worcester Warrior team on loan to play in the RFU Championship. That month, he made his debut off the bench against Hartpury and started his first game the following week against Ampthill. He returned in 2026, representing Bath United in a match against England U20s at the Recreation Ground on 24 January 2026. His performances included a try in a 60-19 win over Sale Sharks in the Rugby Premiership Cup in February 2026.
