= Gabe Goss =

English rugby union player (born 2001)

- Born: Gabriel Goss; 17 December 2001 (age 24)
- Height: 1.82 m (6 ft 0 in)
- Weight: 82 kg (181 lb; 12 st 13 lb)
- School: Beechen Cliff School

Rugby union career
- Position: Wing
- Current team: Bath
Senior career
Years	Team	Apps	(Points)
2021–	Bath		
2022-2023	Taunton Titans (loan)		
International career
Years	Team	Apps	(Points)
2021	England U20		
National sevens team
Years	Team		Comps
2021	England		

Gabe Goss (born 17 December 2001) is an English rugby union player who plays wing for Bath.

== Early life ==
He attended Beechen Cliff School in Bath, Somerset.

== Career ==
A product of the Bath Rugby Academy, he plays on the wing. He was promoted to the senior academy for the 2020-2021 season. He made his debut for the senior Bath side in the Premiership Rugby Cup against Gloucester Rugby in November 2021. Despite being struck by hamstring injuries, he spent time on loan at Taunton Titans during the 2022-23 season. He retained his place in the Bath squad for the 2023-24 season, and played for the side in the Premiership Rugby Cup.

== International career ==
He was called up by England U20 in 2021. He also trained with the England national rugby sevens team that year.

== Style of play ==
A pacey winger, he has been described as "next level quick".
