= Ciaran Donoghue =

English rugby union player (born 2003)

- Born: 7 January 2003 (age 23) Salisbury, England
- Height: 1.84 m (6 ft 0 in)
- Weight: 79 kg (174 lb)
- School: Millfield

Rugby union career
- Position: Full-back
- Current team: Bath
Senior career
Years	Team	Apps	(Points)
2021-	Bath	24	(101)
- Correct as of 1 May 2026

Ciaran Donoghue (born 7 January 2003) is a professional rugby union player for Bath Rugby; his preferred positions are fly half and full-back.

== Early and personal life ==
Born in Salisbury, he later lived in Pilton, Somerset. He has an Irish mother who was born in Enniskillen, and lived on Strangford Lough in County Down and qualifies for both England and Ireland. He started playing rugby union at Abingdon RFC and played age-group rugby for the Irish Exiles. He was educated in Somerset at Millfield where he was selected for an England Under 18s development camp.

== Career ==
He signed a senior academy contract with Bath Rugby for the 2021-22 season. He made his debut for the club off the bench in the Premiership Rugby Cup against Gloucester Rugby on 12 November 2021.

Following an injury to Orlando Bailey, he started at fly-half for Bath's Premiership Rugby Cup in the quarterfinal victory against Newcastle Falcons on 28 February 2025. On 16 March 2025, he kicked five conversions and a penalty in the final as Bath beat Exeter Chiefs 48-14 to win the 2024-25 Premiership Rugby Cup. He made his European debut in a 49-24 away win against Pau in the European Challenge Cup on 4 April 2025, making seven successful conversions. On 26 April 2025, he made his league debut for Bath and scored the opening try of the game for Bath in the Rugby Premiership against Newcastle Falcons, a match that set a new club record for the amount of tries scored in the regular league season, as they won 55-19 with a bonus point to guarantee their position at the top of the league prior to the commencements of the play-offs, and a guaranteed home play-off fixture. The try he scored was described as a try-of-the-season contender, as he burst through the Falcons defence and sidestepped the final defender to cross the try line. In May 2025, he had his contract extended by Bath. He set up the final try of the game as a replacement as Bath beat Edinburgh 39-24 to reach the 2024–25 EPCR Challenge Cup final.

Donoghue missed the first part of 2025-26 season with a knee injury, only returning to training in April 2026.
