= Tom Carr-Smith =

English rugby union player

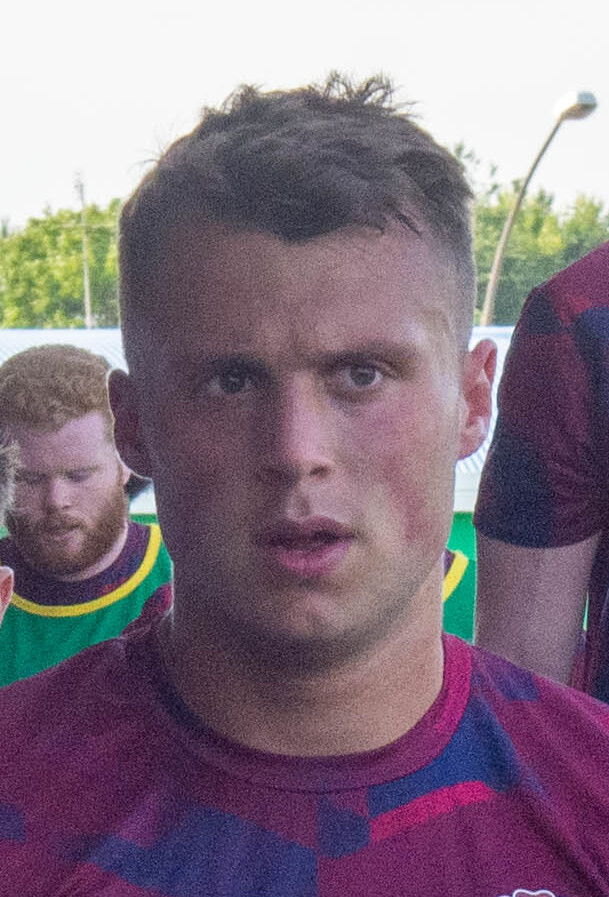
- Carr-Smith in 2022
- Born: 28 February 2002 (age 24) London, England
- Height: 1.87 m (6 ft 2 in)
- Weight: 94 kg (14 st 11 lb; 207 lb)
- School: Sherborne School
- University: University of Bath

Rugby union career
- Position: Scrum-half
Youth career
- Andover R.F.C
- 2015-2021: Bath Rugby
Senior career
Years	Team	Apps	(Points)
2022–	Bath	60	(75)

Tom Carr-Smith (born 28 February 2002) is an English rugby union player who plays for Bath Rugby, predominantly as a scrum-half.

== Early life ==
Carr-Smith is from Amport near Andover in Hampshire. He attended Chafyn Grove School in Salisbury, Wiltshire and then Sherborne School in Dorset. He started playing rugby union as a youngster at Andover Rugby Football Club. He attended the University of Bath to study management.

== Club career ==
Carr-Smith had been involved with Bath Rugby academy since he was thirteen years-old. He signed his first contract with the club in June 2020.

He began to travel and train with the first-team Bath squad in 2021. Predominantly a scrum-half, he made his Rugby Premiership debut for Bath during the 2022-23 season. He made his home league debut for Bath at The Rec' against Northampton Saints on 22 October 2022. He has also played as a substitute out of position on the wing for Bath when required in the Rugby Premiership.

He was named among the Bath replacements for their European Rugby Champions Cup match against Benetton Rugby on 15 December 2024. He signed a new two and-a-half year contract with the club in March 2025. That month, he was a try scorer in the final as Bath beat Exeter Chiefs 48-14 to win the 2024-25 Premiership Rugby Cup. In April 2025, he was a try scorer as Bath beat Gloucester 61-26 to reach the semi-finals of the Rugby Challenge Cup.

On 14 December 2025, he started his first European Cup game, away against RC Toulon in a 45-34 defeat.

== International career ==
Carr-Smith has represented England at youth level, earning caps for the England U20 side, winning the six nations under-20 grand slam in 2021.
