= Jamie Benson =

English rugby player (born 2002)

- Born: 23 September 2002 (age 24) Kensington, England
- Height: 183 cm (6 ft 0 in)
- Weight: 90 kg (198 lb)
- School: Hampton School
- University: University of Cambridge

Rugby union career
- Position: Fly-half
- Current team: Ulster
Senior career
Years	Team	Apps	(Points)
2022–2026	Harlequins	41	(147)
2023–2024	→ Cambridge (loan)	13	(42)
2024–2025	→ London Scottish (loan)	3	(12)
2026–	Ulster	5	(4)
- Correct as of 24 October 2026
International career
Years	Team	Apps	(Points)
2022	England U20s	4	(27)
- Correct as of 26 March 2025

Jamie Benson (born 23 September 2002) is an English-born, Irish-qualified professional rugby union footballer who plays as a fly-half for United Rugby Championship club Ulster. He qualifies to represent Ireland and England, for whom he played at under-20 level. In 2026 he received a call up to the Irish national team.

== Early life ==
The son of two doctors, Benson attended Hampton School in London. He then attended Downing College at University of Cambridge where he studied neuroscience, graduating with first-class honours, and featured for Cambridge University R.U.F.C. three times in The Varsity Match between 2022 and 2024, becoming the record points-scorer in the fixture.

== Club career ==
=== Harlequins ===
Benson played for Harlequins seven times at just 20 years-old in the Premiership Rugby Cup, before joining Cambridge Rugby Club on loan during the 2023-24 season and London Scottish the following season.

He made his Premiership Rugby debut in November 2024. In March 2025, he appeared off-the-bench away against Saracens, scoring 13 points with his boot to help during a 23–12 away victory, the first time the club had beaten Saracens since 2009.

In December 2025, he scored his first try in the Champions Cup during a 68–14 victory against Bayonne. In May 2026, he scored a hat-trick of tries from full-back during a 76–17 victory against Newcastle Red Bulls.

=== Ulster ===
In April 2026, he signed for United Rugby Championship side Ulster ahead of the following season.

== International career ==
Benson qualifies for both England, through birth, and Ireland through ancestry, with his mother born in Belfast.

In February 2022, Benson featured for England at under-20 level, making his debut against Scotland U20, and making his first start the following weekend against Italy U20. He also started their next two fixtures in the tournament which saw England defeat Wales U20 and lose against Ireland U20. Benson was selected for the England A squad in November 2025.

Having been included in an Irish alignment camp in the summer of 2026, he was selected for the senior Ireland rugby union team in October for the 2026 Nations Championship.
