= Jack Musk =

English rugby union player

- Born: Jack Luxton Musk; 4 March 2000 (age 26) Kingston upon Thames, England
- Height: 1.80 m (5 ft 11 in)
- Weight: 100 kg (15 st 10 lb)

Rugby union career
- Position: Hooker
- Current team: Harlequins
Senior career
Years	Team	Apps	(Points)
2017–	Harlequins		
- Correct as of 25 March 2021
- Correct as of 25 March 2021

Jack Musk (born 4 March 2000) is an English rugby union player who plays for Harlequins in the Premiership Rugby.
