= Jordon Poole =

English rugby union player

- Born: Jordon David K. Poole; 2 April 1997 (age 29) Leeds, England
- Height: 1.78 m (5 ft 10 in)
- Weight: 106 kg (16 st 10 lb)

Rugby union career
- Position: Hooker
- Current team: Coventry
Senior career
Years	Team	Apps	(Points)
2015–2018	Leeds Tykes	11	(0)
2019–2022	Exeter Chiefs	10	(0)
2020–	Coventry	16	(30)
- Correct as of 29 June 2022

Jordon Poole (born 2 April 1997) is an English rugby union hooker who plays for Coventry in the RFU Championship. He previously played for Exeter Chiefs in Premiership Rugby and Leeds Tykes in the RFU Championship. His playing position is Hooker.
