= Tom Manz =

English rugby union player (born 2001)

- Born: 9 July 2001 (age 25) Leicester, England
- Height: 2.02 m (6 ft 8 in)
- Weight: 119 kg (18 st 10 lb; 262 lb)
- University: Loughborough University
- Notable relative: Joshua Manz (brother)

Rugby union career
- Position: Lock
- Current team: Leicester Tigers
Senior career
Years	Team	Apps	(Points)
2022-	Leicester Tigers	26	(10)
2022–2026	→ Nottingham (loan)		
2026	→ Cardiff (loan)		
- Correct as of 4 October 2026

Tom Manz (born 9 July 2001) is an English professional rugby union player. He plays as a lock for Leicester Tigers.

== Career ==
Standing at 6ft 8in, Manz plays as a lock forward. He made his debut for his hometown club Leicester Tigers against Connacht in the European Rugby Champions Cup in 2022.

Manz signed a full-time contract with the club in 2024. He made his Rugby Premiership debut for Leicester Tigers against Gloucester during the 2024-25 season. He signed a contract extension with the club in May 2025. The following season, Manz played ten times for Leicester Tigers in all competitions. He also played on-loan for RFU Championship club Nottingham.

Manz joined Cardiff Rugby on a season-long loan prior to the start of the 2026-27 season. However, following an injury to Finn Carnduff he was recalled from his loan and immediately went into the Leicester match-day squad for their match on 3 October 2026 against Newcastle Red Bulls.

== Personal life ==
Manz studied at Loughborough University. His younger brother Josh is also a professional player at Leicester Tigers.
