= Brandon Jackson (rugby union) =

English rugby union player (born 2001)

- Born: Brandon Jackson-Richards; 21 September 2001 (age 25) Greenwich, England
- Height: 1.91 m (6 ft 3 in)
- Weight: 98 kg (15 st 6 lb)
- School: Sutton Valence School
- University: Brunel University

Rugby union career
- Position(s): Centre, Wing
- Current team: Saracens
Amateur team(s)
Years	Team	Apps	(Points)
–	Blackheath	–	(–)
Senior career
Years	Team	Apps	(Points)
2020–	Saracens	21	(45)
2020–21	→Ealing Trailfinders	–	(–)
2022–	→Ampthill	26	(93)
- Correct as of 20 February 2025
International career
Years	Team	Apps	(Points)
2020	England U18s	–	(–)
2020	England U20s	–	(–)
- Correct as of 20 February 2025

Brandon Jackson-Richards (born 21 September 2001) is an English professional rugby union player who plays as a wing and centre for Premiership Rugby club Saracens.

== Rugby career ==
Originally from Greenwich in London, Jackson began playing rugby at Blackheath F.C., progressing through the club's minis and junior sections. He was recruited into the Saracens junior academy as a teenager, and represented their under-18s team in 2019. That same year, he became a designated England Academy Player while attending Sutton Valence School, and also represented the England Under-18s.

Between 2020 and 2021, Jackson joined the academy at Ealing Trailfinders, to coincide with his studies at Brunel University. During this time, he received his first call-up to the England Under-20s. Subsequently, he renewed his contract with Saracens the following year, on a senior academy deal.

Jackson made his senior debut for Saracens against London rivals Harlequins in the 2021–22 Premiership Rugby Cup pool stage, followed by his first Premiership appearance as a substitute against Wasps in January 2022. Over the following two years, he was dual-registered with Ampthill and played the majority of his rugby in the RFU Championship, whilst also featuring for his parent club in the Premiership Cup. Jackson was notably Ampthill's top try scorer during the 2023–24 Championship season, crossing the whitewash 14 times in 17 appearances for the team.

Ahead of the 2024–25 Premiership season, Jackson was promoted into the Saracens senior squad, before earning his first league start against Northampton Saints in December 2024. He also finished the 2024–25 cup campaign as the club's top try scorer, touching down 7 times in 6 matches.
