= Tom Curtis (rugby union) =

English rugby union player

- Full name: Thomas John Curtis
- Born: 1 July 2001 (age 25) Wythenshawe, England
- Height: 181 cm (5 ft 11 in)
- Weight: 88 kg (194 lb; 13 st 12 lb)
- School: Sedbergh School
- Notable relative(s): John Curtis (father); Dean Schofield (stepfather)

Rugby union career
- Position: Flyhalf, Centre
- Current team: Sale Sharks
Youth career
- 2012-2017: Stockport RUFC
- 2017-2019: Sale Sharks
Senior career
Years	Team	Apps	(Points)
2019-	Sale Sharks	39	(80)
2019-2020	→Sale FC(loan)	1	(0)
2020-2021	→Nottingham R.F.C.(loan)	2	(2)
2021-2022	→Coventry R.F.C.(loan)	9	(24)
2022-2023	→Sale FC(loan)	8	(53)
- Correct as of 22 October 2023
International career
Years	Team	Apps	(Points)
2018-2019	England under-18	3	(5)
- Correct as of 22 October 2023

Tom Curtis (born 1 July 2001) is an English rugby union player who plays as a fly-half and centre for Sale Sharks in the Premiership.

== Club career ==
Curtis began playing rugby at 11 years old, originally starting out as a back row he soon moved to fly-half. He captained Sedbergh School to an unbeaten season, winning all 13 games in the process. He was soon picked up by the Sale Sharks Academy.

In June 2019 he signed a 5-year professional contract for Sale Sharks. He made his debut for Sale Sharks in 2019, scoring two conversions and a penalty in a 17-36 Premiership Rugby Cup game against Saracens.

He has spent time on loan at Sale FC in the National League 1, Nottingham and Coventry in the RFU Championship.

== International career ==
He was called up to England under-18 in 2018 and was called up again a year later in 2019, scoring a try against Scotland.
