= Thompson Cowan =

English rugby union player

- Born: 2 August 2002 (age 24) Wrexham, Wales
- Height: 1.88 m (6 ft 2 in)
- Weight: 108 kg (17 st 0 lb; 238 lb)
- University: Loughborough University

Rugby union career
- Position: Flanker
- Current team: Bath
Senior career
Years	Team	Apps	(Points)
2021–	Bath	19	(10)
2024	→ Hartpury (loan)	5	(0)
2025–2026	→ Worcester Warriors (loan)	4	(0)
- Correct as of 1 May 2026
International career
Years	Team	Apps	(Points)
- Wales U20

Thompson Cowan (born 2 August 2002) is a Welsh professional rugby union footballer who plays as a flanker for Bath Rugby.

== Early life ==
Cowan is from Chippenham and was part of the Bath Rugby Developing Player Programme as a 13-year-old through the pathway into the Under-18 side. Following the conclusion of the 2019-20 season, Cowan began to study at Loughborough University where he combined his Chemical Engineering degree with rugby union in the British Universities and Colleges Sport (BUCS) league.

== Club career ==
He signed a two-year scholarship contract with the Bath Rugby academy in 2021. Later that year, he made his Rugby Premiership debut as a replacement against Leicester Tigers in November 2021. That month, he also featured in the Premiership Rugby Cup.

In February 2025, he scored a try for Bath in the Premiership Rugby Cup against Bedford Blues. In May 2025, he had his contract extended by Bath. He started the following season with a try in the Premiership Rugby Cup opening fixture against Exeter Chiefs in September 2025.

== International career ==
He represented Wales national under-20 rugby union team.
