= Mike Austin (rugby union) =

English rugby union player

- Born: Mike Austin; 14 August 2000 (age 26)
- Height: 1.85 m (6 ft 1 in)
- Weight: 87 kg (13 st 10 lb)
- University: University of Gloucestershire

Rugby union career
- Position: Scrum-half
Youth career
- -: Truro RFC Falmouth RFC
Senior career
Years	Team	Apps	(Points)
2021–2023	Cinderford		
2023–2025	Hartpury University	46	(105)
2025–	Gloucester	6	
- Correct as of 5 Dec 2025

Mike Austin (14 August 2000) is an English rugby union player who plays for Gloucester in the Premiership Rugby.

Austin represented Cornwall County under 18s and Falmouth RFC before stepping up to National League 1 with Cinderford. He had an impressive spell that earnt him a place in National One Team of the Season. He soon joined Hartpury University in the RFU Championship from the 2023–24 season.

Austin made a couple of appearances for Gloucester Rugby against both Exeter Chiefs and Newcastle Falcons during the 2024–25 Premiership Rugby Cup. After making impressive performances for Gloucester, it was confirmed that Austin signed a permanent deal with Gloucester for the 2025–26 season.
