= Tadgh McElroy =

Irish rugby union player

- Born: 16 June 1997 (age 29) Dundalk, County Louth, Ireland
- Height: 1.78 m (5 ft 10 in)
- Weight: 105 kg (16 st 7 lb)
- School: St Mary’s College, Dundalk

Rugby union career
- Position: Hooker
Amateur team(s)
Years	Team	Apps	(Points)
2012–2017	Dundalk		
2019–2021	Clontarf		
Senior career
Years	Team	Apps	(Points)
2017–2019	Saracens	3	(0)
2018–2019	→ Bedford Blues	8	(15)
2021	Bristol Bears	0	(0)
2021–2022	Ealing Trailfinders	2	(15)
2021–2022	→ London Irish	4	(5)
2022–2023	Leinster	4	(0)
2023–2024	Connacht	13	(10)
2024	Ulster	2	(0)
2024-	Sale Sharks	24	(35)
- Correct as of 21 October 2024
International career
Years	Team	Apps	(Points)
2017	Ireland U20s	5	(10)
- Correct as of 8 November 2022

Tadgh McElroy (born 16 June 1997) is an Irish rugby union player who plays hooker for Sale Sharks, having previously played for Saracens, Bedford Blues, Bristol Bears, Ealing Trailfinders, London Irish, Leinster, Connacht and Ulster.

McElroy originally came through Connacht academy, before joining Saracens in 2017. His move to Saracens, saw him miss out on the 2017 U20 World Cup, and he remained with the club until 2019 before returning to Ireland, while spending a spell at Bedford Blues. McElroy returned to England in 2021, taking in spells at Bristol Bears, Ealing Trailfinders and London Irish, before joining Leinster on a short-term deal in October 2022. He moved back to Connacht Rugby at the beginning of the 2023/2024 season, and was released at the end of the season. He briefly joined Ulster as short-term injury cover early in the 2024–25 season, before signing for Sale Sharks until the end of the 2025–26 season.

McElroy received a player rating of 90 in the release edition of Rugby 25, the second highest in the game. This attracted significant media attention owing to the unexpected nature of a player of McElroy's standing in the game being rated so highly.
