= Connor Doherty =

English rugby union player

- Born: Connor Sean Doherty; 18 July 2000 (age 26) Manchester, England
- Height: 1.85 m (6 ft 1 in)
- Weight: 93 kg (14 st 9 lb)
- School: St Ambrose College

Rugby union career
- Position: Centre
- Current team: Newcastle Falcons
Senior career
Years	Team	Apps	(Points)
2018–2024	Sale Sharks	24	(5)
2024–	Newcastle Falcons	16	(20)
- Correct as of 5 August 2025
International career
Years	Team	Apps	(Points)
2018	England U18	4	(5)
2019–2020	England U20	7	(5)
- Correct as of 30 June 2021

Connor Doherty (born 18 July 2000) is an English professional rugby union player who plays as a centre for Premiership Rugby club Newcastle Falcons.

== Rugby career ==
Doherty was educated at Saint Ambrose College. He started playing rugby as a junior at Altrincham Kersal. He joined the academy of Sale Sharks and in November 2017 made his professional club debut in an Anglo-Welsh Cup game against Worcester Warriors at the age of seventeen.

Doherty was part of the England Sevens side who won a silver medal at the 2017 Commonwealth Youth Games in The Bahamas. He was a member of the England under-20 squad that finished fifth at the 2019 World Rugby Under 20 Championship. The following year saw him score the winning try against Scotland during the 2020 Six Nations Under 20s Championship.

On 23 May 2024, Doherty would join Premiership rivals Newcastle Falcons on a season-long loan for the 2024-25 season. Doherty then re-signed with the Falcons for the 2025-26 season.
