= George Makepeace-Cubitt =

English rugby player

- Born: 20 February 2004 (age 22) Reading
- Height: 178 cm (5 ft 10 in)
- Weight: 86 kg (190 lb)

Rugby union career
- Position(s): Fly-half; Full-back
Senior career
Years	Team	Apps	(Points)
2022-2023	London Irish		
2023-2024	Rams RFC		
2024-2025	Northampton Saints		
International career
Years	Team	Apps	(Points)
2024	England U20		

George Makepeace-Cubitt (born 20 February 2004) is an English professional rugby union footballer.

== Club career ==
Born in Reading, he has played at both full-back and fly-half. He was part of the rugby union academy of London Irish from the age of 13 years-old and he joined their senior academy for the 2022-23 season. He then played for Rams RFC in National League 1 after London Irish dissolved.

He signed for Northampton Saints following a successful trial in May 2024. He made his Rugby Premiership debut for Northampton Saints on 25 October 2024, kicking two penalties and a conversion against Bristol Bears.

== International career ==
In March 2024 was called-up to play for the England national under-20 rugby union team. That year, he became the first man since Bedford Blues player Josh Bassett in 2012 to represent England U20s in the U20 Six Nations while not linked with a top-flight side.
