= Louie Hennessey =

Welsh rugby union player

- Born: 29 March 2004 (age 22) Cardiff, Wales
- Height: 191 cm (6 ft 3 in)
- Weight: 101 kg (223 lb)
- School: Hartpury College
- University: University of Bath

Rugby union career
- Position: Centre
- Current team: Bath Rugby
Senior career
Years	Team	Apps	(Points)
2022–	Bath	30	(70)
2024–2025	→ Cardiff (loan)	1	(0)
- Correct as of 18 November 2026
International career
Years	Team	Apps	(Points)
2022	Wales U18		
2023–2024	Wales U20	17	(30)
2026	Wales	1	(0)
- Correct as of 18 November 2026

Louie Hennessey (born 29 March 2004) is a Welsh rugby union player who plays for Bath as a centre.

== Early life ==
Hennessey first played rugby at Llanishen RFC at the age of six years-old, before winning the DC Thomas Cup with Cardiff Schools U11s, and winning the Dewar Shield with the Cardiff Schools U16 side. He attended Hartpury College through a partnership with the Cardiff Academy. While at Hartpury, Hennessey captained their rugby team to a league title, winning all ten fixtures. Louie studied at University of Bath after signing with Bath Rugby.

== Club career ==
=== Cardiff ===
Described as a "powerful and skilful centre", as well as "graceful runner with a great turn of pace", Hennessey first signed an academy contract with Cardiff Rugby in 2020.

=== Bath ===
In 2022, Hennessey signed with Bath Rugby. Hennessey made his senior debut on 28 September 2022 in the Premiership Rugby Cup. His competitive debut came on 4 November 2023, against Northampton Saints.

He scored his first Rugby Premiership try for Bath away against Leicester Tigers on 31 December 2023.

Hennessey signed a long-term contract with Bath on 13 November 2024. He was named among the Bath replacements for their European Rugby Champions Cup match against Benetton Rugby on 15 December 2024.

On 23 December 2024, Hennessey rejoined Cardiff on a short term loan, to provide injury cover. He made his debut on 1 January 2025, starting at outside centre against the Ospreys, before moving to wing due to injuries in the backline.

== International career ==
=== Wales age grade ===
Hennessey represented Wales at under-18 level and was named in the NextGen XV World U18 Dream Team in 2022. He then progressed to the Wales U20 side, featuring in the 2023 Six Nations Under 20s Championship. Hennessey made his U20 debut in the opening round against Ireland U20, and scored a try. He represented Wales at the 2023 World Rugby U20 Championship, featuring in all matches. Hennessey was retained in the squad for the 2024 Six Nations Under 20s Championship.

=== Wales ===
On 21 October 2025, Hennessey was selected by Wales for the 2025 end-of-year rugby union internationals, and retained his place for the 2026 Six Nations Championship. He came off the bench against Ireland on 6 March 2026, to make his international debut.
