= Archie Benson =

English rugby union player

- Born: Archie Benson; 18 August 2001 (age 25) Cheltenham, England
- Height: 1.98 m (6 ft 6 in)
- Weight: 106 kg (16 st 10 lb)
- School: Dean Close School
- University: Harper Adams University

Rugby union career
- Position: Flanker
- Current team: Northampton Saints
Senior career
Years	Team	Apps	(Points)
2019–2022	Gloucester	0	(0)
2022–2024	Luctonians	52	(0)
2024–	Northampton Saints	1	(0)
2023–2024	→ Bedford Blues		
- Correct as of 6 December 2024
International career
Years	Team	Apps	(Points)
2018–2019	England U18s	4	(0)
- Correct as of 6 December 2024

Archie Benson (born 18 August 2001) is an English professional rugby union player who plays as a flanker for PREM Rugby club Northampton Saints.

Benson was part of Gloucester academy system as he signed for the Cherry and Whites immediately after leaving Dean Close School in Cheltenham, where he captained the 1st XV and represented England at Under-18 level.

Benson left Gloucester to join Luctonians in National League 2 West where he made 26 league appearances in the 2022/23 season alone as Luctonians ended up second on the ladder. He helped his side to their highest-ever league finishes in back-to-back seasons.

On 1 May 2024, it was announced that Benson has signed for Northampton Saints after a successful trial period for the 2024–25 season. He is also dual-registered with Bedford Blues in the RFU Championship in the same season.
