= Sam Wolstenholme (rugby union) =

English rugby union player

- Born: Samuel James Wolstenholme; 21 June 1999 (age 27) Sheffield, England
- Height: 1.8 m (5 ft 11 in)
- Weight: 88 kg (13 st 12 lb)
- School: Oakham School
- University: Loughborough University

Rugby union career
- Position: Scrum-half
- Current team: Bristol Bears
Senior career
Years	Team	Apps	(Points)
2017–2019	Yorkshire Carnegie	23	(10)
2019–2022	Wasps	37	(20)
2023	Leicester Tigers	2	(0)
2023–2026	Bristol Bears	18	(10)
2026–	Exeter Chiefs		
- Correct as of 29 May 2023

Sam Wolstenholme (born 21 June 1999) is an English rugby union player, for Exeter Chiefs. He has previously played for Leeds Tykes, Wasps,Leicester Tigers, and Bristol Bears in Premiership Rugby. His playing position is scrum-half.

== Career ==
Wolstenholme attended Oakham School and he went to Loughborough University to study economics, while still part of Yorkshire Carnegie academy.

Wolstenholme made his first team debut for Yorkshire Carnegie in the British and Irish Cup pool game against London Scottish at Ilkley in October 2017. He marked the occasion with the clinching try to secure victory for his side. He has been a regular for Hull Ionians on dual registration but originally came from Sheffield RUFC. Wolstenholme made his first start for Yorkshire Carnegie in the British & Irish Cup against the Dragons Premiership Select at the CCBC Centre For Sporting Excellence in Ystrad Mynach in December 2017.

On 24 June 2019, Wolstenholme left Yorkshire Carnegie to join Wasps in the Premiership Rugby from the 2019–20 season. He made his debut for Wasps against Saracens in the Premiership Rugby Cup at the start of the 2019–20 season. He scored a try in another Cup match against Sale Sharks in October 2019. Wasps entered administration on 17 October 2022 and Wolstenholme was made redundant along with all other players and coaching staff.

On 1 January 2023, Leicester Tigers announced his arrival on a short-term contract. He played one game, the Champions Cup quarter final defeat to Leinster, before moving on at the season end. On 30 March 2023, Wolstenholme was announced as a new signing by Bristol Bears.

On 10 March 2026, Wolstenholme signed a deal with West County rivals Exeter Chiefs in the Premiership for the 2026-27 season.
