= Sam Maunder =

English rugby union player

- Born: Sam Maunder; 22 March 2000 (age 26) Exeter, England
- Height: 1.80 m (5 ft 11 in)
- Weight: 81 kg (12 st 11 lb; 179 lb)
- School: Blundell's School
- University: University of Exeter
- Notable relative: Jack Maunder

Rugby union career
- Position: Scrum-half
- Current team: Exeter Chiefs
Senior career
Years	Team	Apps	(Points)
2018–	Exeter Chiefs		
- Correct as of 19 October 2019

Sam Maunder (born 22 March 2000) is an English professional rugby union player who plays as a scrum-half for Premiership Rugby club Exeter Chiefs. He also bench-warmed for Blundell's 1st XV in the Champions Trophy Final in 2018.
