= Finn Carnduff =

English rugby union player (born 2004)

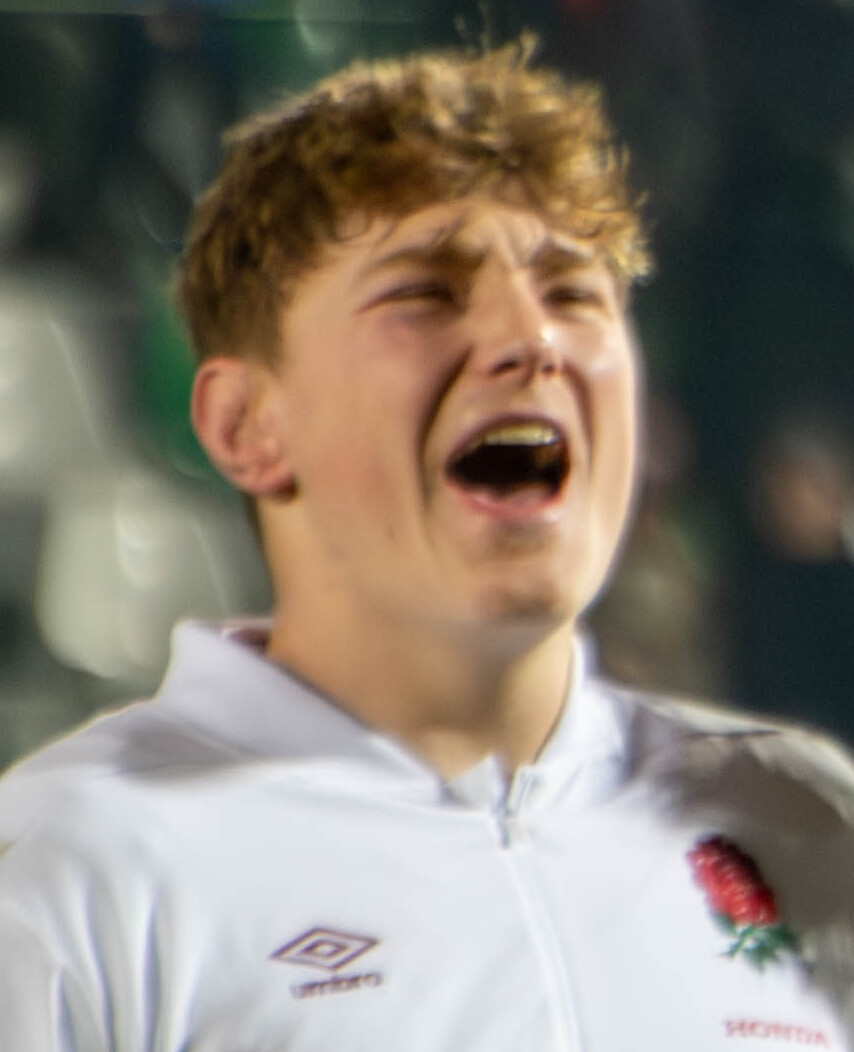
- Born: Finn Sebastian Carnduff; 10 March 2004 (age 22) Leicester, England
- Height: 1.96 m (6 ft 5 in)
- Weight: 111 kg (17 st 7 lb; 245 lb)
- School: Leicester Grammar School
- University: Loughborough University

Rugby union career
- Position: Lock/Flanker
- Current team: Leicester Tigers
Senior career
Years	Team	Apps	(Points)
2022–	Leicester Tigers	25	(35)
- Correct as of 1 November 2026
International career
Years	Team	Apps	(Points)
2021–2022	England U18	6	(5)
2023–2024	England U20	20	(25)
- Correct as of 19 July 2024

Finn Sebastian Carnduff (born 10 March 2004) is an English professional rugby union player. He plays as a lock and flanker for Leicester Tigers and has captained the England under-20 rugby union team.

== Early life ==
Carnduff was a Leicester Tigers fan as a child before joining the club's academy. He initially played at full-back before becoming a second row player. He attended Leicester Grammar School and played for Market Harborough Rugby Club, following in the footsteps of former England captain and head coach and Leicester second row Martin Johnson. Carnduff is currently a student at Loughborough University.

== Club career ==
Capable of playing as a flanker or in the second row, Carnduff made his debut for Leicester Tigers in March 2022 against London Irish in the Premiership Rugby Cup when he was 17 years-old. He made his Premiership Rugby debut for Leicester on the 6 May 2023 against Harlequins. In April 2024, he was named in the Leicester starting XV in the league for the first time, against Northampton Saints.

Carnduff signed a new contract with the club in January 2025.

== International career ==
In April 2022 Carnduff scored a try for England Under-18 against Wales. He scored a try on his debut for England Under-20 in the opening round of the 2023 Six Nations Under 20s Championship against Scotland. Later that year he was a member of the England squad that finished fourth at the 2023 World Rugby U20 Championship.

Carnduff was chosen to captain England for the 2024 Six Nations Under 20s Championship. During the tournament he scored tries against Italy, Scotland and Ireland. He also played in the last round as England claimed the title at Stade du Hameau.

Carnduff also captained England at the 2024 World Rugby U20 Championship and scored a try in a pool stage victory over hosts South Africa. He started in the final as England defeated France at Cape Town Stadium to become junior world champions.

== Honours ==
England U20

- World Rugby U20 Championship
  - (gold) Champion (1): 2024
- Six Nations Under 20s Championship
  - (gold) Champion (1): 2024
