= Bath Rugby =

English rugby union football club

- Full name: Bath Rugby
- Union: Somerset RFU
- Founded: 1865; 161 years ago
- Location: Bath, Somerset, England
- Ground: The Recreation Ground (Capacity: 14,509)
- Director of Rugby: Johann van Graan
- Captain: Ben Spencer
- Most appearances: Phil Hall (580)
- Top scorer: Jon Callard (2,087)
- Most tries: Tony Swift (161)
- League: PREM Rugby
- 2025–26: 2nd of 10 (lost play-off semi-final)
1st kit	2nd kit

Largest win
- Bath 84–7 Sale; 1996–97 National Division One

Largest defeat
- Gloucester 64–0 Bath (Kingsholm Stadium, Gloucester); 30 April 2022

Official website
- bathrugby.com

Bath Rugby is a professional rugby union club in Bath, Somerset, England. They play in the Gallagher PREM, England's top division of rugby. Founded in 1865 as Bath Football Club, since 1894 the club has played at the Recreation Ground in the city centre.

Bath Rugby is the joint-most successful club in England, having won 21 major trophies. It was particularly successful between 1984 and 1998, when it won 10 Domestic Cups, 6 of its 7 League titles, and became the first English side to win the European Cup in 1998. In 2008 and 2025, Bath also won the European Challenge Cup, the continent's second-tier competition.

Bath is one of only three clubs never to have been relegated from the top division of English rugby. They are the reigning champions of England, finishing 1st in the 2024–25 Premiership Rugby season and winning the play off final. This entitles them to play in the 2025-26 European Rugby Champions Cup. The current Head of Rugby is Johann van Graan, who started in July 2022. Matches with local rivals Bristol Bears and Gloucester are referred to as West Country derbies. Bath also have a longstanding rivalry with Leicester Tigers.

== History ==
=== Formation and the early years (1865–1954) ===
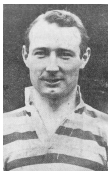
Former player and president, James Pitman for Bath in 1920

Bath Football Club is one of the oldest rugby clubs in existence, having been founded in 1865 by members of Lansdown Cricket Club in Bath, for 'something to do in the winter'. This is the reason why the club colours of the two clubs are identical. With an original home base at The North Parade Ground, in Bathwick, The team then led a nomadic existence during the 1800s playing at Claverton Down, Lambridge Meadows, Taylor's Field and Henrietta Park. They then leased a plot of land at Pulteney Meadow, where today's Rec stands, with most games played against local opposition: Weston-super-Mare, Gloucester, Clifton and the "Arabs" from Bristol.

By the 1890s, Welsh clubs were starting to become regular opponents, with Cardiff and Penarth regularly appearing in the fixture list. With a traditionally lightweight pack, they would suffer regular defeats. The club played its first fixture against overseas opposition in 1907, as Racing Club de Bordelais crossed the Channel to play at the Rec. 1954 saw a first overseas tour by Bath, who beat the French teams St Claude (23–3).

=== Competitive competitions and the glory years (1954–1995) ===
The trip was repeated the following year with wins against St Claude (13–8), Dijon (14–0) and Macon (8–3) as captain Peter Sibley was the first to develop the ethos for fast, attacking rugby in the Sixties. With six-foot four-inch players such as England international back row David Gay, Peter Heindorff, Sibley had players with physique to impose this style of play. The side continued to develop Bath's reputation in the early Seventies with wins over the top Welsh sides. However, the revolution began with the arrival of coach Jack Rowell in 1978.

Rowell transformed the ethos of a club that had traditionally drawn local players. When formalised competitions started in the 1980s Jack Rowell brought premature professionalism to Bath and began to assemble a side with power and precision. The power, provided by Gareth Chilcott, and the precision of Roger Spurrell, was complemented by the quality of John Horton and winger David Trick. By 1984, the first of ten knock-out cup successes had been achieved, at the expense of Bristol. Bath dominated the Anglo-Welsh Cup final winning it four years on a trot, from 1984 to 1987. Bath, after a blip in 1988, dominated, winning it a further six times.

The formalised rugby structure was formed in 1987, and Bath dominated the early years of the first division, being crowned league champions six times in just eight years and doing the "double" four times. Bath were an unstoppable force in 1988–89 and ran away with the league title, winning the first ten of their eleven league matches. A week later, in the Anglo-Welsh Cup final at Twickenham, Bath beat Leicester 10–6 to become the first English club to do the double of winning both League and Cup. 1990 saw the last of six consecutive Twickenham final wins, with the club defeating Gloucester 48–6. 1993–94 saw the team win the Anglo Welsh Cup, beating Leicester. In May 1996, Bath Rugby and Wigan made history by playing against each other at both codes. The first match was at Maine Road, Manchester under League rules and saw Bath struggle, eventually losing 82–6. In the return fixture under Union rules at Twickenham, Bath were able to regain a measure of pride by beating Wigan 44–19.

=== Early Professional era (1995–2021) ===
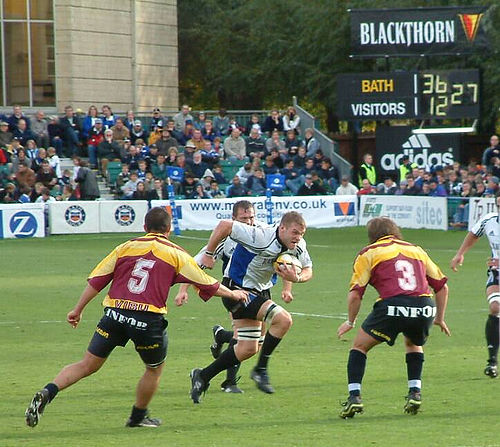
Bath verus Bristol in 2005

Jack Rowell's departure in 1995 and rugby union becoming a professional sport in 1996 had seen Bath struggle to find consistency either on or off the field. With regular changes in the coaching staff and a steady turnaround of players, the formula that led to past successes was still being sought, albeit Bath still managed to be the first British club to lift the European Cup in the 1997–1998 season. Bath beat French club Brive 19–18 in an exciting final in Bordeaux with Jon Callard scoring all the points for Bath. Off the field, the official supporters' club of Bath Rugby was formed in January 1997.

Despite European glory, Bath slumped to sixth in the league the next season. In the disastrous league campaign of 2002–03, relegation was avoided by only a single point on the last day. Having narrowly avoided relegation and merger with rivals Bristol in the 2002–03 season, the club invested heavily in its squad, the team ended the regular season at the top of the table six points, but lost in the play-off final match at Twickenham. Bath finished 4th in the 2004–05 season and also reached the RFU Cup final, though lost to Leeds at Twickenham after a poor display. By the end of the 2004–05 season, coach John Connolly had announced his intention to return to his native Australia, having created one of the most dominant packs in club rugby.

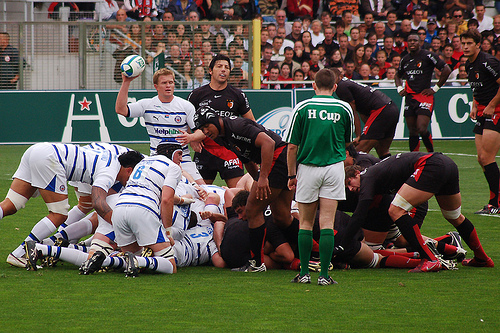
Byron Kelleher and Michael Claassens in 2008

In 2006 they defeated Leicester Tigers in the quarter finals at a sold out Walkers' Stadium in Leicester, Bath then went on to lose the semi-finals against Biarritz. As they finished 9th in the league that year, Bath were ineligible for the 2006–07 competition, instead contesting in the European Challenge Cup, the second level of European rugby. Steve Meehan was appointed the new acting head coach in the summer of 2006.

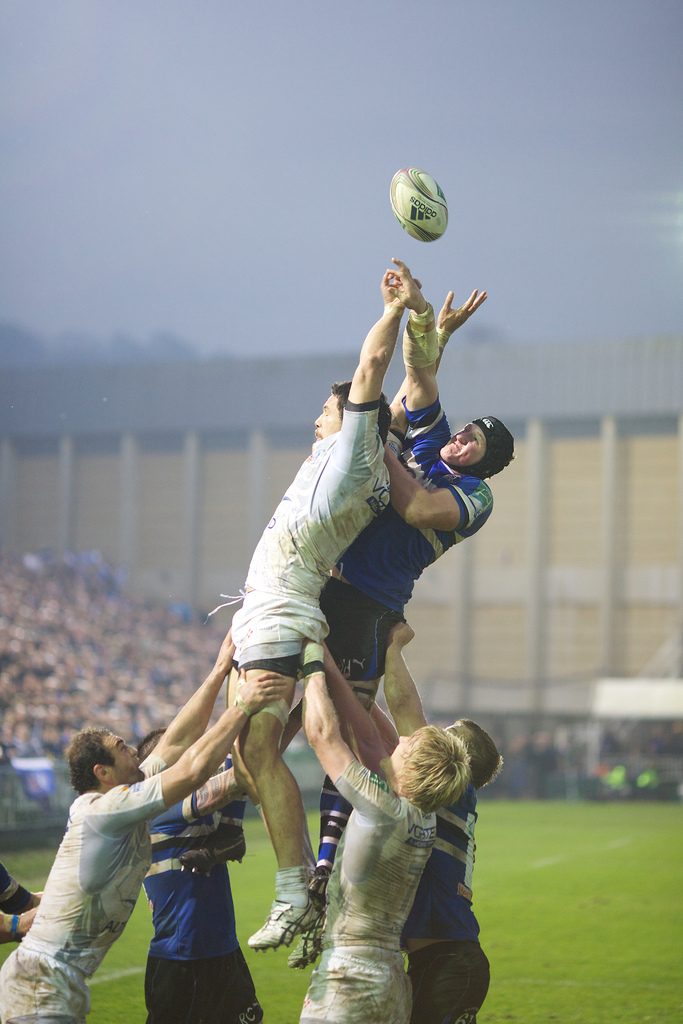
Bath versus Montpellier at the Rec in 2011

In 2008 Bath won their first trophy in ten years, beating Worcester in the European Challenge Cup. On 14 April 2010, British businessman Bruce Craig bought the club from chairman Andrew Brownsword and set out new plans for the future of the club, including a proposal to create a new club headquarters at Farleigh House and plans to create a new 20,000 seater stadium.

Mike Ford became the club's head coach in May 2013. Ford guided Bath to the 2014–15 Premiership Final, where they lost to Saracens. Ford was awarded the Aviva Premiership Director of Rugby of the Year award in 2015 while his son, George Ford, won Player of the Year. However, after a disappointing campaign that saw Bath finish 9th in the table, Mike Ford left the club at the end of the 2015–2016 season.

=== Decline & Resurgence (2021–) ===
The 2021–22 season was Bath's worst ever campaign. In October 2021, they conceded the most points of any Premiership match in their history losing 71–17 at home to Saracens. They finished bottom of the Premiership for the first time in their history, and suffered their greatest ever defeat, against rivals, Gloucester, losing 64–0 at Kingsholm. Ahead of the 2022–23 season, South African coach Johann van Graan joined Bath. Van Graan described Bath as being “broken as a club” when he arrived, but he successfully turned the team around in his first season in charge. The team's improvement in form over the course of the campaign culminated with a 61–29 win over Saracens on the final day, which saw them edge neighbours and rivals Bristol Bears for eighth in the table and a place in the 2023–24 Champions Cup.

Bath finished the 2023-2024 regular season in 2nd place, their highest finish since 2015. After defeating Sale Sharks in the semi-final, Bath competed against Northampton Saints in the Premiership Final, where Bath suffered a narrow 25–21 defeat.

In December 2024, Bath defeated Saracens 68–10 to inflict them with their worst defeat in Premiership history. That same month, owner Bruce Craig submitted a planning application for a new 18,000 capacity stadium. In April 2025, after a 55–19 victory over Newcastle Falcons, they secured top spot in the regular season for the first time since the 2003–04 season. After a disappointing Champions Cup campaign, in which they finished fifth out of six in their pool, Bath qualified for an away Round of 16 fixture in the Challenge Cup. They defeated Pau away from home, then beat Gloucester at home in the quarter-final and Edinburgh away in the semi-final. Bath defeated Lyon 37–12 in the final to win the Challenge Cup for the second time in their history. In June 2025, they defeated Bristol Bears 34–20 at home to advance to the Premiership final for the second year in a row. In the final, Bath defeated Leicester Tigers 23–21 to claim their first league title in 29 years. This was the third leg of a historic treble, having already won the Premiership Cup and the European Rugby Challenge Cup that season. A victory parade was organised for the following day, attracting thousands of supporters. The players were carried in two open-top buses over Pulteney Bridge and up Milsom Street, before heading towards Bath Abbey and ending at The Recreation Ground, where a ticketed party was held.

== Stadium ==
=== The Recreation Ground ===
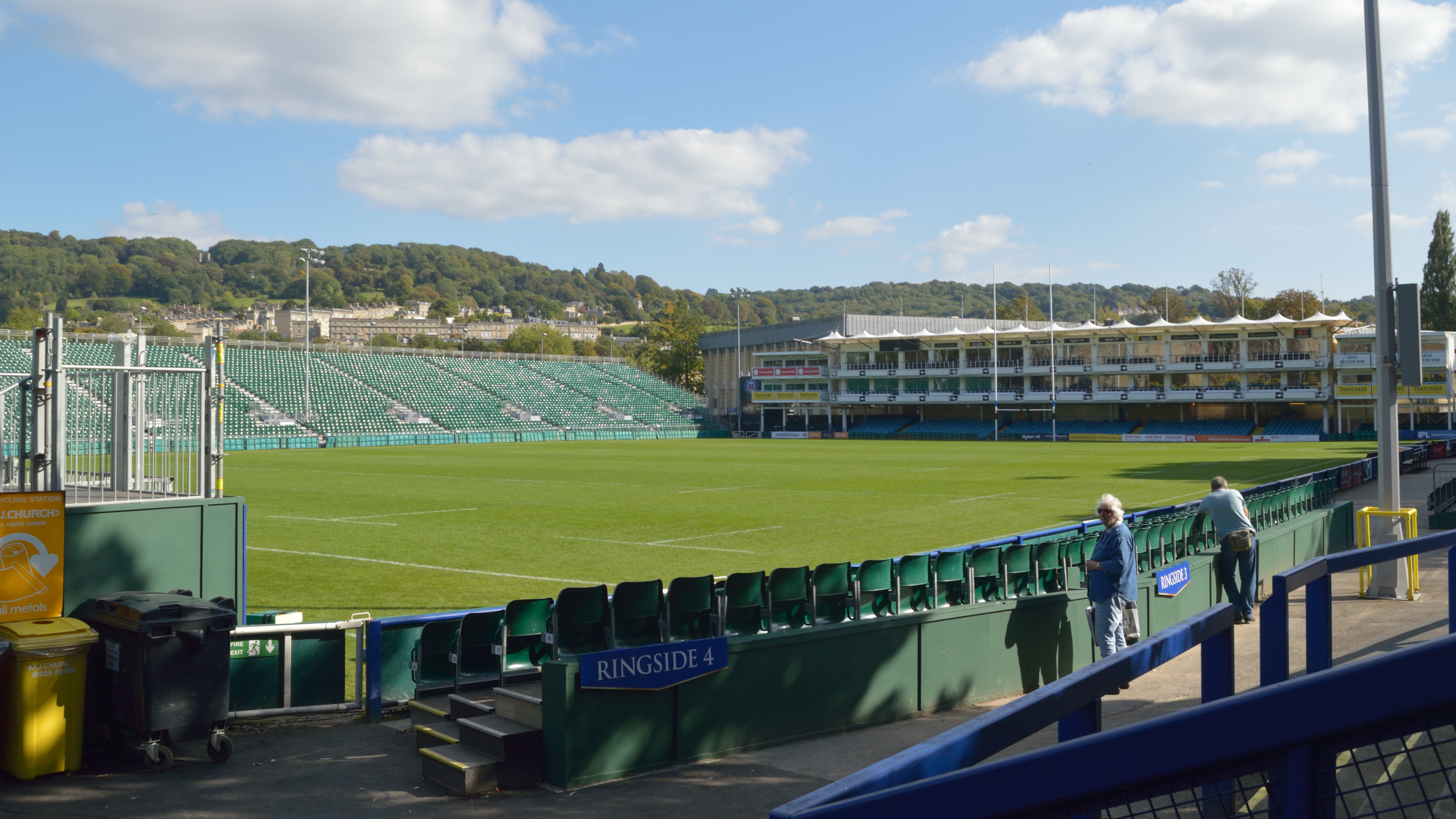
The Recreation Ground

Bath play at the Recreation Ground, also known as "The Rec". The stadium is in the centre of the city, next to the River Avon. For the 2009–10 season the ground capacity was expanded to 11,700, and Bath play all of their home matches there during the club season. During summer, the ground is adjusted to make it capable for holding cricket matches. This cricket field is used for local contests and hosted Somerset County Cricket Club for one match a year until 2011.

In November 2009 the new chief executive, Nick Blofeld, stated the club was seeking a mostly seated stadium for 20,000 to suit modern professional rugby, with potential for future expansion, containing "restaurants and cafés, hospitality suites, conference facilities and good food and beverage outlets and other potential retail outlets". The charitable status of the Rec had prevented progress, but in 2013 the Charity Commission recommended a scheme to allow the club's former training ground at Lambridge to be exchanged for an extended footprint on the Rec, free from the charitable rules.

The club submitted proposals for an 18,500-seat stadium, intending to apply for planning permission in 2014.

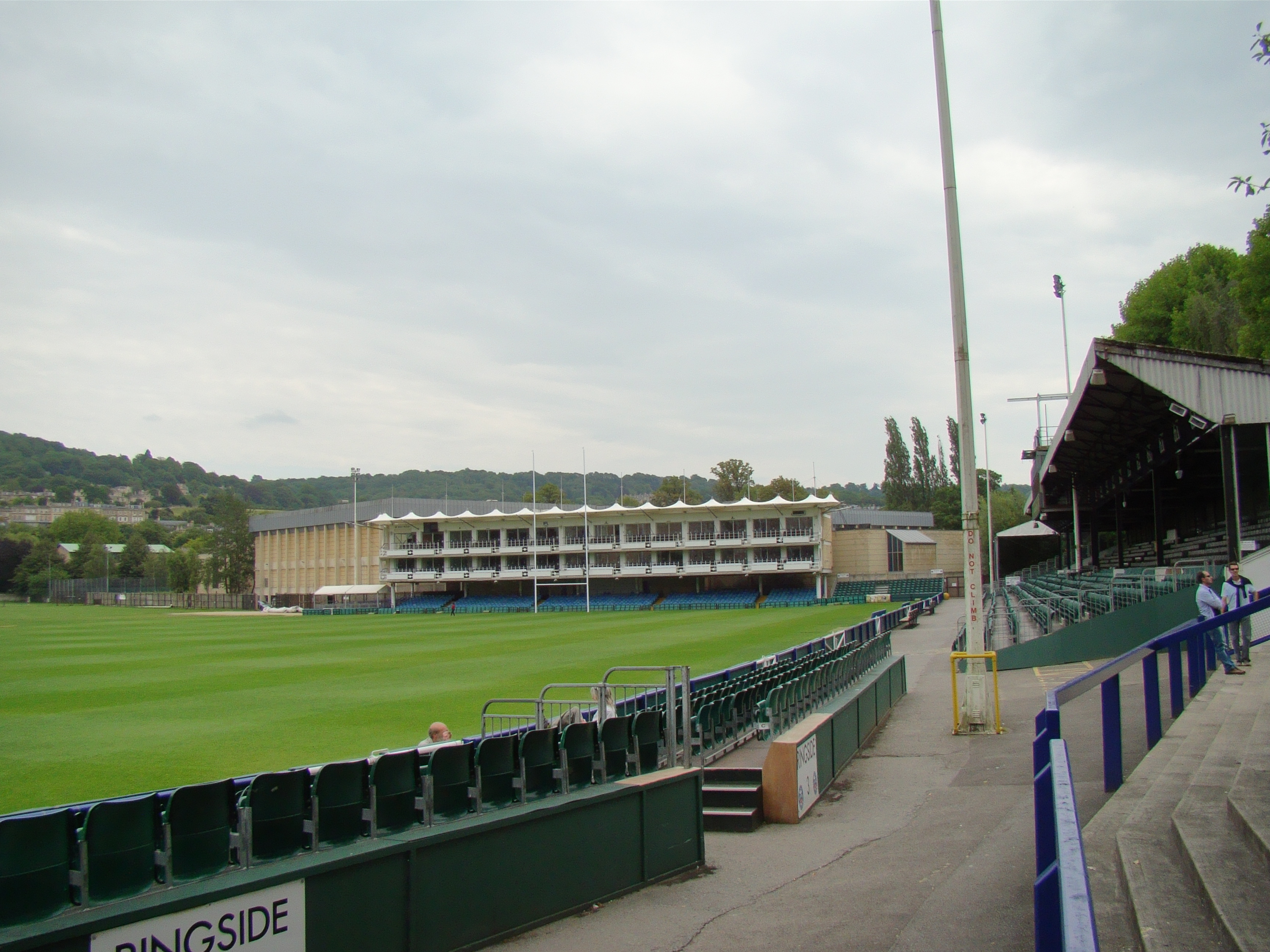
View of the South Stand hospitality boxes

The First Tier Tribunal limited the land on the Rec available which put the club's development plans on ice, and as a consequence the club received planning permission to extend its capacity to 14,000 on a temporary basis for the following two seasons to cover their 150th anniversary celebrations in 2015. After further successful planning applications, the club was able to increase its capacity by 1,000 for the 2016/17 season onwards – taking the capacity to 14,500 spectators for home games.

The works took place during the 2016 off-season and saw the West Stand partially demolished and improved facilities provided, including bars, food outlets and toilets. The new four-year consents enabled Bath to focus on a permanent redevelopment solution for the Rec, without on-going debate around temporary stands. Permanent development proposals were intended to be brought forward long before the expiry of the four-year period.

An updated decision in December 2016 from the Charity First-Tier Tribunal relating to a revised Scheme for the governance of the Bath Recreation Ground, including the use of the Recreation Ground site, was said by the club to "re-open the door to redevelopment at the Rec", and in 2023 a planning application for a new stadium was submitted which was revised, amended and resubmitted in January 2025. A final decision by Bath & North East Somerset Council's planning committee is awaited, but the revised application has achieved the support of a number of key organisations including the Bath Preservation Trust and UNESCO. This will see a stadium that seats 18,000.

=== Twickenham Stadium ===
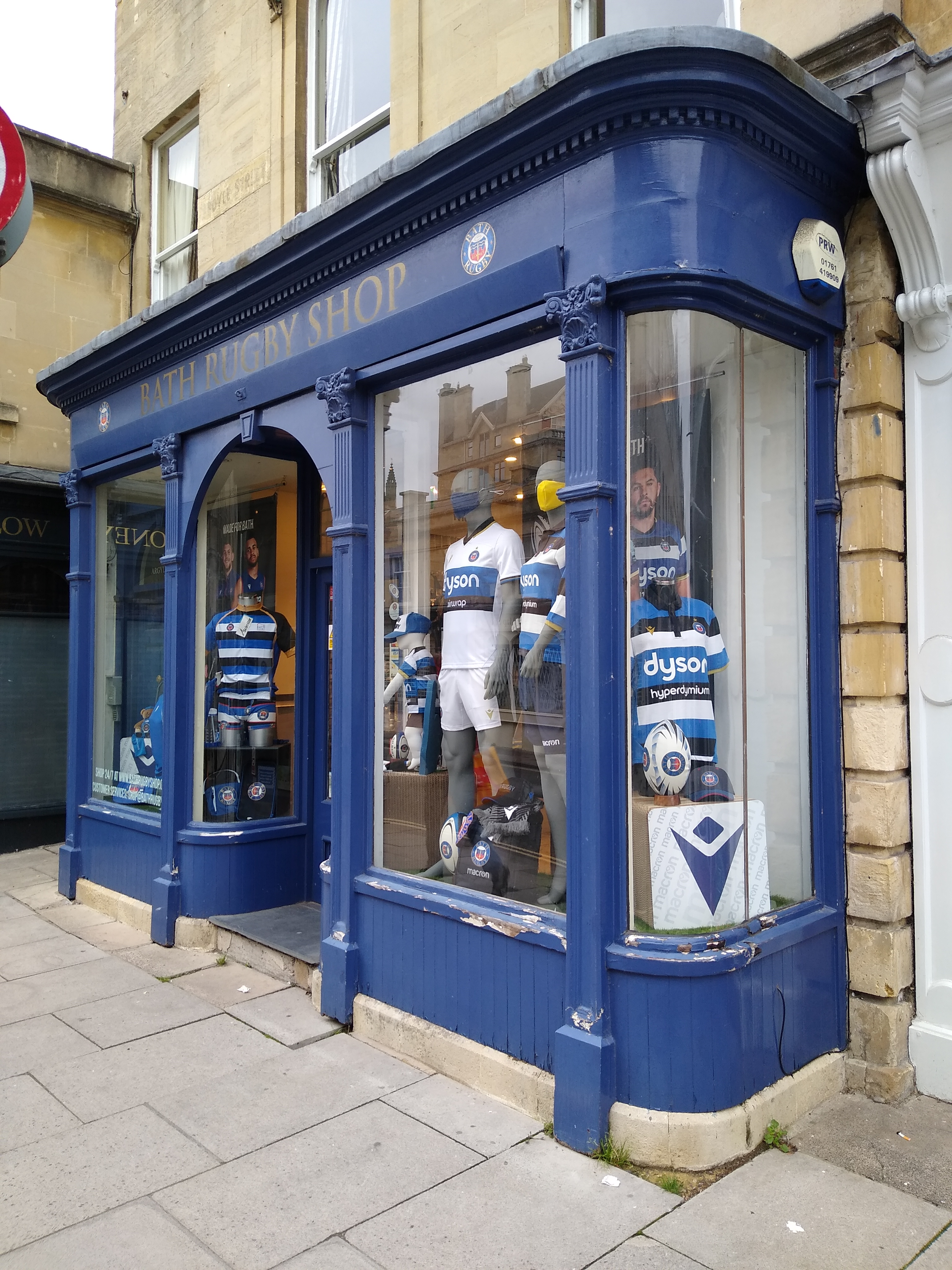
Bath Rugby club shop, next to Pultney Bridge in Bath city centre

Between the 2016–17 and 2018–19 seasons, Bath Rugby played an annual home fixture at Twickenham Stadium. The fixture; dubbed The Clash was normally played around Easter and formed part of a five-year deal to host games at Twickenham. The 2017 match had an attendance of 61,868, and the 2018 match had 60,880 spectators.

== Kit ==
Between 2020 and 2023, the kit was supplied by Macron.

Castore have been the preferred kit supplier since the start of the 2023–24 season.

Previous kit suppliers:

Supplier	Years
Castore	2023 - present
Macron	2020 - 2023
Canterbury	2015 - 2020
Tri Distribution	2013 - 2015
Puma	2006 - 2013
Cotton Traders	2003 - 2006
Adidas	1998 - 2003

== Seasons ==
Key

- Pts = Points
- Pos = Final position
- Div 1 = Division 1
- Prem = Premiership Rugby
- PS = Pool Stage
- R1 = Round 1
- R2 = Round 2
- R3 = Round 3
- R4 = Round 4
- R5 = Round 5
- R6 = Round 6
- R16= Round of 16
- QF = Quarter-finals
- SF = Semi-final
- RU = Runners Up

Winners	Runners-up

League				Cup		
Season	Division	Pts	Pos	Domestic Cup	Champions Cup	Challenge Cup
1987–88	Div 1	30	4th	QF	–	–
1988–89	Div 1	20	1st	Champions	–	–
1989–90	Div 1	16	3rd	Champions	–	–
1990–91	Div 1	22	1st	R3	–	–
1991–92	Div 1	21	1st	Champions	–	–
1992–93	Div 1	22	1st	R3	–	–
1993–94	Div 1	31	1st	Champions	–	–
1994–95	Div 1	27	2nd	Champions	–	–
1995–96	Div 1	31	1st	Champions	–	–
1996–97	Prem	31	2nd	R5	QF	–
1997–98	Prem	26	3rd	R5	Champions	–
1998–99	Prem	30	6th	R4	–	–
1999–00	Prem	43	2nd	R4	PS	–
2000–01	Prem	70	3rd	R4	PS	–
2001–02	Prem	33	11th	R6	QF	–
2002–03	Prem	36	11th	QF	–	RU
2003–04	Prem	79	1st	QF	–	SF
2004–05	Prem	58	4th	RU	PS	–
2005–06	Prem	46	9th	SF	SF	–
2006–07	Prem	45	8th	R4	–	RU
2007–08	Prem	69	3rd	R4	–	Champions
2008–09	Prem	65	4th	R1	QF	–
2009–10	Prem	61	4th	R1	PS	–
2010–11	Prem	62	5th	R1	PS	–
2011–12	Prem	44	8th	SF	PS	–
2012–13	Prem	53	7th	SF	–	QF
2013–14	Prem	67	5th	SF	–	RU
2014–15	Prem	75	2nd	PS	QF	–
2015–16	Prem	48	9th	–	PS	–
2016–17	Prem	59	5th	R1	–	SF
2017–18	Prem	56	6th	RU	PS	–
2018–19	Prem	56	6th	R1	PS	–
2019–20	Prem	67	4th	R1	PS	–
2020–21	Prem	52	7th	–	–	SF
2021–22	Prem	34	13th	PS	–	R16
2022–23	Prem	47	8th	PS	–	PS
2023–24	Prem	60	2nd	PS	R16	–
2024–25	Prem	72	1st	Champions	PS	Champions
2025–26	Prem	69	2nd	SF	SF	–

== Honours ==
Bath Rugby Honours
Competition	Titles	Seasons
Premiership Rugby	7	1988–89, 1990–91, 1991–92, 1992–93, 1993–94, 1995–96, 2024–25
RFU Knockout Cup	10	1983–84, 1984–85, 1985–86, 1986–87, 1988–89, 1989–90, 1991–92, 1993–94, 1994–95, 1995–96
Premiership Rugby Cup	1	2024–25
European Champions Cup	1	1997–98
European Challenge Cup	2	2007–08, 2024–25

== Players ==
The Bath Rugby squad for the 2026–27 season is:

=== Senior squad ===
Bath Rugby 2026–27 Premiership Rugby squad
**Props**: (Scotland) **Jamie Bhatti**; (Argentina) Marcos Camerlinckx; (Wales) Ioan Emanuel; (Wales) **Archie Griffin**; (England) Scott Kirk; (England) **Beno Obano**; (England) Billy Sela; (England) **Will Stuart** (Note: Will Stuart is jointly contracted with the RFU, via an enhanced England Elite Player Squad (EPS) contract.); (England) Kieran Verden; **Hookers**: (England) **Tom Dunn**; (England) Dan Frost; (England) Max Pearce; (England) Jasper Spandler; (England) Kepu Tuipulotu; **Locks**: (England) Jack Bennett; (England) **Charlie Ewels**; (Ireland) Ross Molony; (Italy) **Enoch Opoku-Gyamfi**; (England) Ewan Richards; (Ireland) **Quinn Roux**	**Back row**: (Scotland) **Josh Bayliss**; (South Africa) Jaco Coetzee; (Wales) Thompson Cowan; (South Africa) **Dan du Preez**; (England) Arthur Green; (England) **Ted Hill**; (England) **Guy Pepper** (Note: Guy Pepper is jointly contracted with the RFU, via an enhanced England Elite Player Squad (EPS) contract.); (England) Miles Reid; (England) George Timmins; (England) **Sam Underhill**; **Scrum-halves**: (England) Tom Carr-Smith; (Wales) Ieuan Davies; (South Africa) Bernard van der Linde; (England) **Ben Spencer** **(c)**; **Fly-halves**: (England) Ciaran Donoghue; (England) Will Roue; (Scotland) **Finn Russell**	**Centres**: (Wales) **Louie Hennessey**; (England) **Ollie Lawrence**; (England) **Max Ojomoh**; (Scotland) **Cameron Redpath**; **Wings**: (England) **Henry Arundell**; (England) **Joe Cokanasiga**; (England) Charlie Griffin; (England) **Will Muir**; (England) Tyler Offiah; **Fullbacks**: (Argentina) **Santiago Carreras**; (England) Austin Emens; (England) Tom de Glanville; (Wales) Jack Woods
**(c)** denotes the team captain. **Bold** denotes internationally capped players. Notes: Source:

=== Senior Academy ===
Bath Rugby 2026-27 Senior Academy squad
**Props**: (England) Alfie Griffin; (England) Theo Malik (Note: Academy University scholar player); (England) Henry Mountford (Note: Academy University scholar player); (England) Jacob Yates (Note: Academy University scholar player); (England) Claudius Wheeler; **Hookers**: (Wales) Evan Gallagher (Note: Academy University scholar player); (Wales) Oscar Thomas; **Second row**: (England) Tom Hilton (Note: Academy University scholar player); (England) Rory McKnight; (England) Isaac Sprenger (Note: Academy University scholar player)	**Back row**: (England) Fred Kempton (Note: Academy University scholar player); (England) Will Keylock (Note: Academy University scholar player); (England) James Maloney (Note: Academy University scholar player); (Wales) Alex Ridgway; (England) Connor Treacey; (England) Alex Yeabsley; **Scrum-halves**: (England) Isaac Mears; **Fly-halves**: (England) Max Hooper; (England) James Linegar	**Centres**: (Wales) Bailey Cutts; (England) Jack Harrison; (England) Declan Treacey; (England) Cam Ward (Note: Academy University scholar player); **Wing**: (England) Rocky Prowse (Note: Academy University scholar player); **Fullbacks**: (England) Sam Winters; (England) Harry Walker (Note: Academy University scholar player)
**Bold** denotes internationally capped players. Italics denotes U20 international. Notes: Source:

=== Rugby World Cup ===
The following are players which have represented their countries at the Rugby World Cup, whilst playing for Bath, players in bold won the tournament.

Tournament	Players selected	England players	Other national team players
1987	6	Gareth Chilcott, Graham Dawe, David Egerton, Jon Hall, Nigel Redman, Richard Hill	
1991	4	Nigel Redman, Richard Hill, Jeremy Guscott, Jonathan Webb	
1995	12	Ben Clarke, Graham Dawe, Jeremy Guscott, John Mallett, Jonathan Callard, Phil de Glanville, Mike Catt, Steve Ojomoh, Victor Ubogu	Simon Geoghegan (Ireland) , Dave Hilton, Eric Peters (Scotland)
1999	7	Victor Ubogu, Phil de Glanville, Jeremy Guscott, Mike Catt, Matt Perry	Kevin Maggs (Ireland) , Dan Lyle (United States)
2003	6	**Iain Balshaw**, **Mike Tindall**, **Mike Catt**, **Danny Grewcock**	Kevin Maggs (Ireland) , Simon Danielli (Scotland)
2007	6	Lee Mears, Matt Stevens, Steve Borthwick, Olly Barkley, Nick Abendanon	Eliota Fuimaono-Sapolu (Samoa)
2011	7	David Wilson, Lee Mears, Lewis Moody, Matt Banahan	Chris Biller (United States) , Anthony Perenise (Samoa) , Francois Louw (South Africa)
2015	12	Rob Webber, David Wilson, George Ford, Sam Burgess, Jonathan Joseph, Anthony Watson	Nikola Matawalu (Fiji) , Dominic Day, Rhys Priestland (Wales) , Alafoti Faosiliva (Samoa) , Francois Louw (South Africa) , Horacio Agulla (Argentina)
2019	6	Sam Underhill, Jonathan Joseph, Joe Cokanasiga, Ruaridh McConnochie, Anthony Watson	**Francois Louw** (South Africa)
2023	5	Ollie Lawrence, Will Stuart, Sam Underhill	Cameron Redpath, Finn Russell (Scotland)

=== Past club captains ===
Captaincy for the entire season only is counted, individual games are not included.

- 2022– (England) Ben Spencer
- 2019–22 (England) Charlie Ewels
- 2017–19 (England) Matt Garvey
- 2016–17 (England) Guy Mercer
- 2011–16 (England) Stuart Hooper
- 2010–11 (South Africa) Luke Watson
- 2009–10 (South Africa) Michael Claassens
- 2008–09 (England) Michael Lipman and (England) Alex Crockett
- 2005–08 (England) Steve Borthwick
- 2003–05 (Wales) Jonathan Humphreys
- 2002–03 (England) Danny Grewcock
- 2001–02 (United States) Dan Lyle

=== British and Irish Lions ===
The following are players which have represented the British and Irish Lions whilst playing for Bath:

Tour	Players selected	England players
1904 British Lions tour to Australia and New Zealand	1	Ron Rogers
1989 British Lions tour to Australia	3	Gareth Chilcott, Jeremy Guscott, Andy Robinson
1993 British Lions tour to New Zealand	4	Stuart Barnes, Jeremy Guscott, Andy Reed, Ben Clarke
1997 British Lions tour to South Africa	3	Mike Catt, Jeremy Guscott, Nigel Redman
2001 British & Irish Lions tour to Australia	3	Iain Balshaw, Matt Perry, Mike Catt
2005 British & Irish Lions tour to New Zealand	2	Danny Grewcock, Matt Stevens
2009 British & Irish Lions tour to South Africa	1	Lee Mears
2017 British & Irish Lions tour to New Zealand	3	Taulupe Faletau, Jonathan Joseph, Anthony Watson
2021 British & Irish Lions tour to South Africa	2	Taulupe Faletau, Anthony Watson
2025 British & Irish Lions tour to Australia	2	Finn Russell, Will Stuart

== Management ==
Position	Name
Head of Rugby	(South Africa) Johann van Graan
Defence Coach	(South Africa) JP Ferreira
Attack Coach	(England) Martin Gleeson
Forwards Coach	(England) Richard Blaze
Scrum Coach	(Scotland) Stevie Scott
Contact Coach and Head Academy Coach	(England) Andy Robinson
Head of academy	(England) Craig Lilley
