= 2022–23 Premiership Rugby =

Rugby union competition in England

- Countries: England
- Number of teams: 13 (before 6 October 2022); 12 (6–28 October 2022); 11 (after 28 October 2022)
- Date: 10 September 2022 – 27 May 2023
- Champions: Saracens (6th title)
- Runners-up: Sale Sharks
- Relegated: Worcester Warriors, Wasps
- Matches played: 120
- Attendance: 1,607,418 (average 13,395 per match)
- Highest attendance: 55,109 – Saracens v Harlequins, 25 March 2023
- Lowest attendance: 3,126 – Newcastle Falcons v Exeter Chiefs, 25 November 2022
- Tries scored: 838 (average 7 per match)
- Top point scorer: (Ireland) Paddy Jackson (London Irish) – 205 points
- Top try scorer: (England) Cadan Murley (Harlequins) – 15 tries

Official website
- www.premiershiprugby.com

The 2022–23 Premiership Rugby was the 36th season of the top flight of English domestic rugby union competition and the fifth to be sponsored by Gallagher. The competition was broadcast by BT Sport for the tenth successive season, with six league season games and the final also simulcast free-to-air by ITV. Highlights of each weekend's games were shown on ITV with extended highlights on BT Sport. This was the final season to be aired on BT Sport before its rebrand to TNT Sports in July 2023.

The reigning champions entering the season were Leicester Tigers, who claimed their 11th league title after winning the 2022 final. No team was promoted as champions from the 2021–22 RFU Championship.

Due to changes to the global rugby calendar implemented in 2020 and to allow more time for preparation for the World Cup, the season started and finished earlier than previous seasons and took place over a slightly reduced timeframe of 38 weeks.

On 26 September 2022, due to ongoing financial difficulties, Worcester Warriors were suspended from all tournaments. On 6 October 2022, it was announced that Worcester would be relegated from the Premiership, after the club was placed into administration and all player and staff contracts were terminated – their results were subsequently deleted from the Premiership's records.

On 12 October 2022, due to ongoing financial difficulties, Wasps were suspended from all tournaments. The club then entered administration on 17 October 2022 and their players and coaching staff were made redundant. On October 28, it was confirmed that Wasps had been suspended for the remainder of the season and relegated – their results were subsequently deleted from the Premiership's records.

== Rule changes ==
This season saw the final year of a three-year moratorium on relegation from the league to the RFU Championship.

This season was the second under the reduced salary cap regulations before changes are made before 2024–25. Further changes for this season were:

- Excluded players were reduced to one, with an exception made if a team had two excluded players contracts currently in place. If two excluded players remain contracted, both remain excluded until the first of their contracts expire.

== Teams ==
For the second consecutive year, all of the teams from the previous season initially competed in the league. Despite winning the RFU Championship in the 2021–22 season, Ealing Trailfinders were ineligible for promotion, after failing to meet the RFU minimum standards criteria. Therefore, the league continued to have 13 teams at the start of the season.

Worcester Warriors were suspended from all competitions on 26 September 2022 and then expelled on 6 October 2022, reducing the league to 12 teams.

Wasps were suspended from all competitions on 12 October 2022 and then expelled on 28 October 2022, reducing the league further to 11 teams.

=== Stadiums and locations ===
2022–23 Gallagher Premiership teams
2021-22 Gallacher Premiership teams in Greater London

Club	Director of Rugby/ Head Coach	Captain	Kit supplier	Stadium	Capacity	City/Area
Bath	(South Africa) Johann van Graan	(England) Ben Spencer	Macron	The Recreation Ground	14,509	Bath, Somerset
Bristol Bears	(Samoa) Pat Lam	(New Zealand) Steve Luatua	Umbro	Ashton Gate	27,000	Bristol
Exeter Chiefs	(England) Rob Baxter (England) Ali Hepher	(England) Jack Yeandle	Samurai Sportswear	Sandy Park	15,600	Exeter, Devon
Gloucester	(England) George Skivington	(England) Lewis Ludlow	Oxen Sports	Kingsholm	16,115	Gloucester, Gloucestershire
Harlequins	(Australia) Billy Millard (Note: Director of Rugby Performance) (New Zealand) Tabai Matson	(South Africa) Stephan Lewies	Castore	Twickenham Stoop (Note: Harlequins would also play two home games at Twickenham Stadium on 4 March 2023 and 22 April 2023.)	14,800	Twickenham, Greater London
Leicester Tigers	(England) Richard Wigglesworth (Note: Steve Borthwick was the head coach of Leicester until 19 December 2022, when he departed the club to take up the position of England head coach. Assistant coach Richard Wigglesworth was then appointed as the Tigers interim head coach until the end of the season.)	(South Africa) Hanro Liebenberg	Samurai Sportswear	Welford Road	25,849	Leicester, Leicestershire
London Irish	(Ireland) Declan Kidney (Australia) Les Kiss	(England) Matt Rogerson	BLK	Gtech Community Stadium	17,250	Brentford, Greater London
Newcastle Falcons	(England) Dave Walder (Note: Dave Walder stepped down as the head coach of Newcastle on 16 March 2023, ahead of his departure from the club at the end of the season. Assistant coach Mark Laycock took charge on an interim basis for the last four rounds.)	(England) Will Welch	Macron	Kingston Park	10,200	Newcastle upon Tyne, Tyne and Wear
Northampton Saints	(England) Phil Dowson (England) Sam Vesty	(England) Lewis Ludlam	Macron	Franklin's Gardens	15,200	Northampton, Northamptonshire
Sale Sharks	(England) Alex Sanderson (England) Paul Deacon	(South Africa) Jono Ross	Macron	AJ Bell Stadium	12,000	Salford, Greater Manchester
Saracens	(Ireland) Mark McCall (England) Joe Shaw	(England) Owen Farrell	Castore	StoneX Stadium (Note: Saracens would also play one home game at Tottenham Hotspur Stadium on 25 March 2023.)	10,500	Hendon, Greater London
Wasps (Note: Wasps were suspended from the league on 12 October 2022, entered administration on 17 October 2022, and their results were expunged on 28 October 2022.)	(England) Lee Blackett	(England) Joe Launchbury	Hummel	Coventry Building Society Arena	32,609	Coventry, West Midlands
Worcester Warriors (Note: Worcester were suspended from the league on 26 September 2022 after entering administration, and their results were expunged on 6 October 2022.)	(England) Steve Diamond	(England) Ted Hill	O'Neills	Sixways Stadium	11,499	Worcester, Worcestershire

== Table ==
2022–23 Premiership Rugby table
Pos	Team	Pld	W	D	L	PF	PA	PD	TF	TA	TB	LB	Pts	Qualification (Note: Worcester Warriors and Wasps were suspended from the Premiership, after both clubs entered administration during the 2022–23 season. They were each automatically relegated, in accordance with RFU regulations, for the 2023–24 season, and their results were expunged from the league table.)
1	Saracens (C)	20	15	0	5	622	513	+109	78	64	13	1	74	Play-offs, Berth in the 2023–24 Champions Cup
2	Sale Sharks (RU)	20	14	0	6	576	435	+141	75	53	10	3	69	Play-offs, Berth in the 2023–24 Champions Cup
3	Leicester Tigers (SF)	20	11	1	8	560	490	+70	73	66	9	4	59	Play-offs, Berth in the 2023–24 Champions Cup
4	Northampton Saints (SF)	20	11	0	9	620	611	+9	84	86	11	3	58	Play-offs, Berth in the 2023–24 Champions Cup
5	London Irish (Note: London Irish are ineligible for a place in either the 2023–24 Champions Cup or the 2023–24 Challenge Cup, despite their table position, due to the club's off-season suspension from all competitions.)	20	10	0	10	543	485	+58	69	65	8	7	55	Ineligible
6	Harlequins	20	9	0	11	546	551	−5	78	75	11	4	51	Berth in the 2023–24 Champions Cup
7	Exeter Chiefs	20	10	0	10	450	513	−63	61	68	4	4	48	Berth in the 2023–24 Champions Cup
8	Bath	20	8	0	12	528	540	−12	68	72	8	7	47	Berth in the 2023–24 Champions Cup
9	Bristol Bears	20	8	1	11	515	536	−21	72	65	9	4	47	Berth in the 2023–24 Champions Cup
10	Gloucester	20	7	0	13	435	504	−69	61	66	6	7	41	Berth in the 2023–24 Challenge Cup
11	Newcastle Falcons	20	6	0	14	399	616	−217	52	91	4	3	31	Berth in the 2023–24 Challenge Cup

Updated to match(es) played on 6 May 2023. Source:
Rules for classification: Games cancelled due to COVID-19 will be recorded as 0–0 but a win and 4 points will be awarded if a club was able to field a team and a loss and 2 points awarded if they were not.
Tiebreakers for teams tied on points: 1) Number of matches won; 2) Difference between points for and against; 3) Total number of points for; 4) Aggregate number of points scored in matches between tied teams; 5) Number of matches won excluding the first match, then the second and so on until the tie is settled.
(C) Champions; (RU) Runners-up; (SF) Losing semi-finalists

=== Round-by-round progression ===
The grid below shows each team's progression throughout the season, indicating their points total (and league table position) at the end of every round:

Team Progression
Team	R1	R2	R3	R4	R5	R6	R7	R8	R9	R10	R11	R12	R13	R14	R15	R16	R17	R18	R19	R20	R21	R22	R23	R24
Saracens	0 (11th)	5 (5th)	10 (4th)	15 (1st)	20 (1st)	25 (1st)	29 (1st)	34 (1st)	38 (1st)	43 (1st)	43 (1st)	43 (1st)	43 (1st)	48 (1st)	52 (1st)	56 (1st)	57 (1st)	62 (1st)	62 (1st)	62 (1st)	67 (1st)	68 (1st)	73 (1st)	74 (1st)
Sale	5 (2nd)	10 (1st)	10 (2nd)	14 (2nd)	19 (2nd)	24 (2nd)	24 (2nd)	24 (2nd)	28 (2nd)	28 (2nd)	32 (2nd)	32 (2nd)	33 (2nd)	38 (2nd)	43 (2nd)	48 (2nd)	50 (2nd)	51 (2nd)	56 (2nd)	56 (2nd)	56 (2nd)	60 (2nd)	64 (2nd)	69 (2nd)
Leicester	1 (6th)	6 (2nd)	11 (1st)	11 (4th)	11 (5th)	16 (3rd)	16 (4th)	16 (6th)	16 (7th)	17 (7th)	22 (5th)	24 (5th)	28 (4th)	28 (6th)	29 (7th)	30 (8th)	34 (8th)	38 (6th)	43 (3rd)	48 (3rd)	53 (3rd)	58 (3rd)	58 (3rd)	59 (3rd)
Northampton	1 (7th)	6 (3rd)	6 (7th)	8 (7th)	8 (Note: Match result and player scores deleted from record, after Wasps were relegated from the league.) (7th)	13 (6th)	13 (7th)	18 (5th)	22 (4th)	24 (3rd)	24 (4th)	24 (6th)	24 (7th)	29 (5th)	29 (6th)	33 (4th)	38 (3rd)	43 (3rd)	43 (4th)	48 (4th)	48 (5th)	53 (4th)	58 (4th)	58 (4th)
London Irish	0 (Note: Match result and player scores deleted from record, after Worcester were relegated from the league.) (10th)	0 (11th)	2 (9th)	7 (8th)	7 (8th)	7 (10th)	8 (11th)	9 (10th)	9 (10th)	10 (11th)	12 (11th)	17 (10th)	21 (9th)	22 (9th)	26 (9th)	31 (7th)	35 (5th)	36 (7th)	41 (5th)	46 (5th)	51 (4th)	51 (5th)	51 (5th)	55 (5th)
Harlequins	5 (1st)	6 (4th)	8 (6th)	13 (3rd)	13 (4th)	13 (5th)	17 (3rd)	22 (3rd)	22 (3rd)	22 (4th)	26 (3rd)	30 (3rd)	31 (3rd)	31 (3rd)	31 (6th)	32 (6th)	34 (7th)	34 (8th)	39 (6th)	40 (8th)	41 (8th)	46 (6th)	47 (7th)	51 (6th)
Exeter	4 (4th)	4 (7th)	9 (5th)	9 (6th)	14 (3rd)	14 (4th)	15 (5th)	15 (7th)	16 (6th)	20 (6th)	21 (6th)	21 (7th)	25 (6th)	25 (7th)	30 (5th)	34 (3rd)	34 (7th)	38 (5th)	38 (8th)	43 (6th)	43 (6th)	43 (7th)	47 (6th)	48 (7th)
Bath	1 (5th)	1 (8th)	1 (10th)	2 (11th)	3 (11th)	5 (11th)	9 (9th)	9 (9th)	13 (8th)	17 (8th)	17 (8th)	18 (8th)	19 (11th)	23 (8th)	23 (10th)	24 (10th)	24 (11th)	25 (11th)	26 (11th)	27 (11th)	32 (10th)	37 (10th)	42 (9th)	47 (8th)
Bristol	5 (3rd)	5 (6th)	10 (3rd)	10 (5th)	10 (6th)	12 (7th)	12 (8th)	13 (8th)	13 (9th)	13 (10th)	14 (10th)	17 (11th)	21 (10th)	21 (11th)	21 (11th)	22 (11th)	27 (9th)	31 (9th)	36 (9th)	41 (7th)	41 (7th)	41 (8th)	42 (8th)	47 (9th)
Gloucester	0 (9th)	0 (10th)	2 (8th)	2 (10th)	6 (9th)	11 (8th)	15 (6th)	20 (4th)	20 (5th)	21 (5th)	21 (7th)	26 (4th)	26 (5th)	30 (4th)	31 (4th)	32 (5th)	37 (4th)	39 (4th)	39 (7th)	39 (9th)	40 (9th)	40 (9th)	41 (10th)	41 (10th)
Newcastle	1 (8th)	1 (9th)	1 (11th)	6 (9th)	6 (10th)	8 (9th)	8 (10th)	8 (11th)	9 (11th)	13 (9th)	17 (9th)	17 (9th)	21 (8th)	21 (10th)	26 (8th)	26 (9th)	26 (10th)	27 (10th)	27 (10th)	27 (10th)	31 (11th)	31 (11th)	31 (11th)	31 (11th)

Key
Win	Draw	Loss	Bye	Expunged

== Regular season ==
The original fixtures for the regular season were announced by Premiership Rugby on 19 July 2022. The league season began on 10 September 2022, a day later than first scheduled, after the opening night fixtures were postponed by 24 hours following the death of Queen Elizabeth II. The season concluded with the Premiership Final on 27 May 2023. Referees appointed to officiate Premiership matches are employed by the RFU, unless indicated otherwise.

The regular season was initially set to play out over 26 rounds of six matches, with each of the 13 teams playing 24 times, plus two bye weeks. However, after the removal of Worcester Warriors and Wasps from the league, several teams experienced extra bye weeks due to the cancellation of fixtures against those two clubs. In response to the disrupted schedule, Premiership Rugby announced a revised fixture list for the second half of the season on 11 November 2022.

The revised league season consisted of 24 rounds of five games each, the last of which took place on the first weekend of May. All 11 remaining teams completed a total of 20 matches, with one bye week each in the second half of the season.

Highlights of the season include:

- Slater Cup – Leicester Tigers and Gloucester contested the inaugural Slater Cup at Welford Road on 24 December 2022, and at Kingsholm on 12 March 2023.
- Big Game 14 – Harlequins hosted Exeter Chiefs in this season's edition of The Big Game at Twickenham Stadium on 4 March 2023. (Note: Big Game 14 was originally due to take place between Harlequins and Bristol on 27 December 2022, but this fixture was moved to Twickenham Stoop as a consequence of industrial action, resulting in a change of date and opponents for the event.)
- The Showdown 3 – Saracens hosted Harlequins in this season's edition of The Showdown at Tottenham Hotspur Stadium on 25 March 2023. (Note: The Showdown – Part 3 set a new record for the biggest television audience for a Premiership match in history.)
- Big Summer Kick-Off 2 – Harlequins hosted Bath in this season's edition of the Big Summer Kick-Off at Twickenham Stadium on 22 April 2023.

=== Results ===
Home \ Away	BAT	BRI	EXE	GLO	HAR	LEI	LON	NEW	NOR	SAL	SAR	~~WAS~~	~~WOR~~
Bath	—	13–15	36–19	17–21	13–19	19–18	10–25	24–16	27–14	20–37	61–29	31–39	X
Bristol Bears	31–29	—	14–50	36–21	51–26	26–26	40–36	30–12	62–8	20–36	10–25	X	X
Exeter Chiefs	20–15	22–21	—	24–17	43–42	24–20	22–17	24–5	35–12	24–22	20–22	X	X
Gloucester	24–33	31–28	38–22	—	28–26	5–26	8–6	21–27	34–19	22–25	16–19	27–21	X
Harlequins	35–45	12–15	40–5	21–12	—	19–27	26–24	48–20	35–29	16–24	27–30	X	X
Leicester Tigers	48–27	46–24	62–19	28–13	17–20	—	33–31	36–21	18–19	16–26	24–18	X	X
London Irish	47–38	23–7	17–14	21–22	42–24	22–25	—	39–17	37–22	36–18	29–20	X	45–14
Newcastle Falcons	10–17	30–15	24–21	17–12	31–40	45–26	19–34	—	5–66	20–14	14–34	X	X
Northampton Saints	45–26	45–31	26–19	41–34	46–17	21–41	38–22	32–31	—	38–34	38–29	X	X
Sale Sharks	30–27	25–20	28–20	27–17	13–29	40–5	37–14	54–12	29–22	—	35–24	X	X
Saracens	37–31	20–19	35–3	41–39	36–24	51–18	45–21	29–23	45–39	33–22	—	X	X
~~Wasps~~	X	8–23	X	X	X	X	X	X	36–40	X	X	—	X
~~Worcester Warriors~~	X	X	21–36	X	X	X	X	39–5	X	X	X	X	—

Source: Premiership Rugby
Note: Worcester and Wasps were suspended from the league on 26 September 2022 and 12 October 2022 after entering administration, and their results were expunged on 6 October 2022 and 28 October 2022.
Legend: Blue = home team win; Yellow = draw; Red = away team win.

=== Round 1 ===
10 September 2022
15:00

Exeter Chiefs	24 – 20	Leicester Tigers (1 BP)
Try: Penalty try 18'; Kata 37' c Schickerling 80' c Con: J. Simmonds (2/2) 39', 80+1'; Pen: J. Simmonds (1/1) 2'	Report	Try: Liebenberg 48' c Clare 58' c Con: Gopperth (2/2) 49', 60'; Pen: Burns (2/2) 12', 35'

Sandy Park
Attendance: 9,579
Referee: Christophe Ridley

10 September 2022
15:00

~~(1 BP) London Irish~~	~~45 – 14~~	~~Worcester Warriors~~
Try: ~~Donnell 12' c~~ ~~B. White 23' c~~ ~~Hassell-Collins 29' m~~ ~~Arundell (2) 48' m, 80+2' c~~ ~~W. Joseph 59' m~~ ~~Creevy 70' c~~ Con: ~~P. Jackson (3/5) 13', 24', 49'~~; ~~Englefield (2/2) 71', 80+3'~~	Report	Try: ~~Langdon 66' c~~ ~~Shillcock 76' c~~ Con: ~~O. Williams (2/2) 67', 77'~~

Gtech Community Stadium
Attendance: 6,729
Referee: Wayne Barnes

10 September 2022
15:00

(1 BP) Newcastle Falcons	31 – 40	Harlequins (1 BP)
Try: G. McGuigan (2) 12' m, 58' c Radwan 30' m Earle 39' c Mulipola 65' c Con: Connon (3/5) 40+1', 60', 66'	Report	Try: Green 18' c Louw 24' c Head 43' c Anyanwu 53' c Dombrandt 74' c Marchant 78' m Con: Allan (5/6) 19', 25', 45', 53', 74'

Kingston Park
Attendance: 5,025
Referee: Luke Pearce

10 September 2022 (Note: Match postponed from 9 September 2022, due to the death of Queen Elizabeth II.)
17:30

(1 BP) Bristol Bears	31 – 29	Bath (1 BP)
Try: Genge (2) 1' c, 71' c Bradbury 26' m Morahan 35' m Capon 78' c Con: Sheedy (1/3) 2'; MacGinty (2/2) 72', 79'	Report	Try: B. Spencer 15' c Dunn 54' c Con: Francis (2/2) 16', 55'; Pen: Francis (5/5) 8', 20', 39', 66', 75'

Ashton Gate
Attendance: 22,021
Referee: Matthew Carley

11 September 2022
15:00

(1 BP) Sale Sharks	29 – 22	Northampton Saints (1 BP)
Try: Warr 11' c L. James 55' c S. James 58' c O'Flaherty 61' m Con: R. du Preez (3/4) 12', 56', 59'; Pen: R. du Preez (1/1) 37'	Report	Try: Collins (2) 65' c, 80' m O. Sleightholme 69' c Con: J. Grayson (2/3) 66', 70'; Pen: J. Grayson (1/1) 3'

AJ Bell Stadium
Attendance: 4,064
Referee: Tom Foley

11 September 2022
15:00

~~(1 BP) Gloucester~~	~~27 – 21~~	~~Wasps (1 BP)~~
Try: ~~Rees-Zammit 42' m~~ ~~Chapman 45' c~~ ~~Penalty try 67'~~; ~~Clarke 72' m~~ Con: ~~Hastings (1/3) 46'~~; Pen: ~~Hastings (1/1) 59'~~	Report	Try: ~~C. Atkinson 19' c~~ ~~Shields 25' c~~ ~~Odendaal 29' c~~ Con: ~~C. Atkinson (3/3) 20', 26', 30'~~

Kingsholm
Attendance: 11,124
Referee: Anthony Woodthorpe

Bye/s: Saracens

=== Round 2 ===
17 September 2022
14:00

(1 BP) Northampton Saints	38 – 22	London Irish
Try: Augustus 9' c O. Sleightholme 52' m Mitchell 55' c Furbank 72' c Con: J. Grayson (2/3) 10', 56'; Furbank (1/1) 73'; Pen: J. Grayson (2/2) 38', 61'; Furbank (2/2) 69', 77'	Report	Try: W. Joseph 63' m Penalty try 67'; Hassell-Collins 80+1' c Con: Englefield (1/1) 80+2'; Pen: P. Jackson (1/1) 43'

Franklin's Gardens
Attendance: 10,658
Referee: Luke Pearce

17 September 2022
15:00

Bath	20 – 37	Sale Sharks (1 BP)
Try: J. Cokanasiga 42' c de Glanville 73' c Con: Francis (2/2) 44', 74'; Pen: Francis (2/2) 15', 28'	Report	Try: O'Flaherty 4' c A. van der Merwe 29' c T. Curry 51' c Ross 78' c Con: R. du Preez (4/4) 5', 30', 52', 79'; Pen: R. du Preez (3/3) 18', 33', 38'

Recreation Ground
Attendance: 11,704
Referee: Christophe Ridley

17 September 2022
15:00

(1 BP) Harlequins	27 – 30	Saracens (1 BP)
Try: Murley (2) 3' c, 8' c Marchant 36' c Con: Allan (3/3) 5', 10', 37'; Pen: Allan (2/2) 15', 64'	Report	Try: Daly 21' m Malins (2) 28' c, 46' m Tompkins 62' c Con: Farrell (2/4) 29', 62'; Pen: Farrell (1/1) 57'; Daly (1/1) 66'

Twickenham Stoop
Attendance: 12,831
Referee: Tom Foley

17 September 2022
15:00

(1 BP) Leicester Tigers	36 – 21	Newcastle Falcons
Try: Cronin 3' c Nadolo (2) 7' m, 37' c Ashton 39' c Cracknell 73' c Con: Gopperth (4/5) 4', 38', 40', 74'; Pen: Gopperth (1/1) 71'	Report	Try: J. Barton 17' c G. McGuigan 32' c M. Carreras 47' c Con: Connon (3/3) 19', 33', 48'

Welford Road
Attendance: 18,106
Referee: Craig Maxwell-Keys

17 September 2022
15:00

~~Wasps~~	~~8 – 23~~	~~Bristol Bears~~
Try: ~~Cruse 6' m~~ Pen: ~~C. Atkinson (1/2) 45'~~	Report	Try: ~~Sheedy 20' c~~ ~~Bradbury 60' c~~ Con: ~~Sheedy (2/2) 21', 61'~~; Pen: ~~Sheedy (2/2) 10', 53'~~; Drop: ~~Sheedy (1/1) 77'~~

Coventry Building Society Arena
Attendance: 6,878
Referee: Karl Dickson

18 September 2022
15:00

~~Worcester Warriors~~	~~21 – 36~~	~~Exeter Chiefs (1 BP)~~
Try: ~~Hearle 23' c~~ ~~G. Simpson 45' c~~ ~~Lawrence 64' c~~ Con: ~~O. Williams (2/2) 24', 46'~~; ~~Searle (1/1) 65'~~	Report	Try: ~~J. Simmonds 3' m~~ ~~Capstick (2) 16' c, 32' c~~ ~~Woodburn 57' c~~ ~~J. Maunder 71' c~~ Con: ~~J. Simmonds (4/5) 17', 33', 58', 72'~~; Pen: ~~J. Simmonds (1/1) 38'~~

Sixways
Attendance: 4,999
Referee: Matthew Carley

Bye/s: Gloucester

=== Round 3 ===
23 September 2022
19:45

~~(1 BP) Bath~~	~~31 – 39~~	~~Wasps (1 BP)~~
Try: ~~Gallagher 36' c~~ ~~Dunn (2) 56' c, 66' c~~ ~~J. Joseph 61' c~~ Con: ~~O. Bailey (2/2) 37', 57'~~; ~~Francis (2/2) 62', 67'~~; Pen: ~~Francis (1/1) 79'~~	Report	Try: ~~Bassett (2) 23' m, 49' m~~ ~~J. Willis 27' c~~ ~~W. Porter 30' c~~ Con: ~~Umaga (2/4) 28', 31'~~; Pen: ~~Umaga (5/5) 12', 14', 39', 40+2', 80+1'~~

Recreation Ground
Attendance: 11,987
Referee: Wayne Barnes

24 September 2022
15:00

(1 BP) Bristol Bears	40 – 36	London Irish (2 BP)
Try: Morahan 18' c Capon 22' c Genge 33' c Randall 40+4' m Heenan 60' c Lahiff 62' c Con: MacGinty (5/6) 19' 23', 34', 61', 64'	Report	Try: B. White 5' c Arundell 44' c P. Jackson 51' c Miller 73' c Janse van Rensburg 78' m Con: P. Jackson (4/5) 6', 45', 53', 74'; Pen: P. Jackson (1/1) 17'

Ashton Gate
Attendance: 19,231
Referee: Tom Foley

24 September 2022
15:00

Northampton Saints	21 – 41	Leicester Tigers (1 BP)
Try: Mitchell 15' c Freeman 17' c Coles 44' c Con: Biggar (3/3) 16', 18', 45'	Report	Try: Steward (3) 39' c, 76' c, 79' m G. Porter 47' c Ashton 69' m Martin 73' c Con: Burns (4/6) 40', 48', 74', 77'; Pen: Burns (1/1) 7'

Franklin's Gardens
Attendance: 14,623
Referee: Karl Dickson

24 September 2022
15:00

(1 BP) Saracens	41 – 39	Gloucester (2 BP)
Try: Malins 3' c Earl 26' c Hallett 61' c Woolstencroft (2) 75' c, 80+2' c Con: Farrell (4/4) 4', 62', 76', 80+3'; Daly (1/1) 27'; Pen: Farrell (2/2) 24', 35'	Report	Try: Rapava-Ruskin (2) 17' c, 53' c Tuisue 39' c C. Harris 44' m Hastings 47' c Con: Hastings (4/5) 18', 40', 48', 54'; Pen: Hastings (2/2) 29', 70'

StoneX Stadium
Attendance: 9,212
Referee: Craig Maxwell-Keys

24 September 2022
15:00

~~(1 BP) Worcester Warriors~~	~~39 – 5~~	~~Newcastle Falcons~~
Try: ~~Hearle 17' c~~ ~~D. van der Merwe 26' m~~ ~~G. Simpson 66' c~~ ~~Kvesic 70' c~~ ~~Batley 79' c~~ Con: ~~Searle (4/5) 18', 67', 71', 80'~~; Pen: ~~Searle (2/2) 36', 62'~~	Report	Try: ~~G. McGuigan 6' m~~

Sixways
Attendance: 4,999
Referee: Adam Leal

25 September 2022
15:00

(1 BP) Exeter Chiefs	43 – 42	Harlequins (2 BP)
Try: H. Williams 3' c Townsend 11' c Tshiunza (2) 22' c, 80+2' m Skinner 38' c Schickerling 68' c Con: J. Simmonds (4/4) 4', 12', 23', 39'; Slade (1/1) 69'; Pen: J. Simmonds (1/1) 7'	Report	Try: Murley (2) 28' c, 49' c Green 46' c Northmore (2) 55' c, 60' c Marchant 71' c Con: M. Smith (6/6) 29', 47', 50', 57', 61', 72'

Sandy Park
Attendance: 9,399
Referee: Ian Tempest

Bye/s: Sale Sharks

=== Round 4 ===
30 September 2022
19:45

(1 BP) Newcastle Falcons	30 – 15	Bristol Bears
Try: M. Carreras (2) 17' m, 80+4' c Collett 21' m G. McGuigan 32' c Con: T. Schoeman (2/4) 33', 80+5'; Pen: T. Schoeman (2/3) 64', 77'	Report	Try: Purdy 51' m Lane 58' c Con: MacGinty (1/2) 59'; Pen: MacGinty (1/1) 13'

Kingston Park
Attendance: 4,215
Referee: Luke Pearce

1 October 2022
15:00

Gloucester	Cancelled (Note: Match cancelled because Worcester were unable to fulfill the fixture after entering into administration.)	Worcester Warriors

Kingsholm

1 October 2022
15:00

(1 BP) London Irish	47 – 38	Bath (1 BP)
Try: Hassell-Collins (3) 4' c, 27' c, 38' c Loader (3) 14' c, 23' c, 57' c P. Jackson 80' m Con: P. Jackson (6/6) 5', 16', 25', 28', 40', 58'	Report	Try: Hamer-Webb 19' m Gallagher 44' m J. Cokanasiga 52' c Annett (2) 71' c, 77' c Francis 80+4' c Con: O. Bailey (4/6) 53', 72', 78', 80+5'

Gtech Community Stadium
Attendance: 7,227
Referee: Karl Dickson

1 October 2022
15:00

Sale Sharks	28 – 20	Exeter Chiefs
Try: B. Curry 37' c A. van der Merwe 47' c Carpenter 69' m Con: R. du Preez (2/3) 39', 48'; Pen: R. du Preez (3/4) 25', 62', 78'	Report	Try: Cowan-Dickie 12' c S. Maunder 51' c Con: Slade (2/2) 14', 52'; Pen: Slade (2/3) 31', 73'

AJ Bell Stadium
Attendance: 6,205
Referee: Wayne Barnes

1 October 2022
15:00

(1 BP) Saracens	51 – 18	Leicester Tigers
Try: Lozowski 15' c Earl 23' m Malins 31' c Van Zyl 39' m Daly 61' c McFarland 68' c Maitland 79' c Con: Farrell (4/6) 16', 32', 62', 69'; Daly (1/1) 80+1'; Pen: Farrell (2/2) 13', 66'	Report	Try: Cronin 21' c Steward 51' m Con: Burns (1/2) 21'; Pen: Burns (2/2) 7', 10'

StoneX Stadium
Attendance: 9,428
Referee: Matthew Carley

2 October 2022
15:00

(1 BP) Harlequins	35 – 29	Northampton Saints (2 BP)
Try: Musk (2) 5' c, 48' c Anyanwu 7' c Northmore 25' c Murley 64' c Con: M. Smith (5/5) 6', 8', 27', 50', 65'	Report	Try: Ludlam 34' c Freeman 56' m Furbank 68' c T. James 75' c Con: Biggar (3/4) 35', 69', 76'; Pen: Biggar (1/1) 21'

Twickenham Stoop
Attendance: 14,816
Referee: Christophe Ridley

Bye/s: Gloucester
Wasps

=== Round 5 ===
7 October 2022
19:45

Bristol Bears	14 – 50	Exeter Chiefs (1 BP)
Try: Fricker 5' c Capon 62' c Con: Sheedy (1/1) 6'; MacGinty (1/1) 63'	Report	Try: Nowell (2) 19' c, 56' c Woodburn (2) 27' c, 51' c Cowan-Dickie 64' c Van Heerden 69' c Capstick 73' m Con: J. Simmonds (3/3) 20', 28', 52'; Slade (3/4) 57', 65', 70'; Pen: J. Simmonds (1/1) 13'

Ashton Gate
Attendance: 19,365
Referee: Christophe Ridley

8 October 2022
15:00

(1 BP) Bath	17 – 21	Gloucester
Try: M. Reid 24' c Dunn 51' m Annett 64' m Con: Francis (1/1) 26'	Report	Try: Alemanno (2) 11' c, 37' c Socino 19' c Con: Hastings (3/3) 12', 21', 38'

Recreation Ground
Attendance: 13,162
Referee: Tom Foley

8 October 2022
15:00

Leicester Tigers	16 – 26	Sale Sharks (1 BP)
Try: J. Wiese 29' c Con: Burns (1/1) 31'; Pen: Burns (3/3) 7', 17', 23'	Report	Try: Roebuck 11' m R. du Preez 32' c T. Curry 48' c Quirke 52' c Con: R. du Preez (3/4) 34', 49', 53'

Welford Road
Attendance: 20,344
Referee: Luke Pearce

8 October 2022
15:00

Worcester Warriors	Cancelled	Harlequins

Sixways

9 October 2022
15:00

Newcastle Falcons	14 – 34	Saracens (1 BP)
Try: Blamire 66' c M. Carreras 70' c Con: T. Schoeman (2/2) 67', 71'	Report	Try: Lewington 3' m Pifeleti 9' c Lozowski 24' c Malins (2) 33' c, 57' m Con: Farrell (3/5) 10', 25', 34'; Pen: Farrell (1/1) 74'

Kingston Park
Attendance: 6,125
Referee: Wayne Barnes

9 October 2022
15:00

~~(2 BP) Wasps~~	~~36 – 40~~	~~Northampton Saints (1 BP)~~
Try: ~~J. Willis 11' c~~ ~~Odogwu 17' m~~ ~~Oghre 54' c~~ ~~C. Atkinson 57' m~~ Con: ~~Umaga (2/4) 12', 55'~~; Pen: ~~Umaga (3/3) 21', 25', 65'~~; ~~Haydon-Wood (1/1) 77'~~	Report	Try: ~~Coles (2) 40' m, 78' c~~ ~~O. Sleightholme 58' c~~ ~~Penalty try 67'~~; ~~Skosan 80+1' m~~ Con: ~~Furbank (1/2) 59'~~; ~~Hutchinson (1/2) 79'~~; Pen: ~~Biggar (3/3) 5', 14', 43'~~

Coventry Building Society Arena
Attendance: 10,249
Referee: Adam Leal

Bye/s: Harlequins
London Irish

=== Round 6 ===
14 October 2022
19:45

(1 BP) Sale Sharks	37 – 14	London Irish
Try: D. du Preez 12' c Carpenter 37' m Roebuck (2) 43' c, 55' c Ashman 78' m Con: R. du Preez (3/4) 13', 44', 56'; Pen: R. du Preez (2/2) 26', 68'	Report	Try: Hassell-Collins 39' c Janse van Rensburg 50' c Con: P. Jackson (2/2) 40+1', 52'

AJ Bell Stadium
Attendance: 6,293
Referee: Karl Dickson

15 October 2022
15:00

Exeter Chiefs	Cancelled (Note: Match cancelled because Wasps were unable to fulfill the fixture after entering into administration.)	Wasps

Sandy Park

15 October 2022
15:00

(1 BP) Gloucester	31 – 28	Bristol Bears (2 BP)
Try: J. Reid 11' c Rapava-Ruskin (2) 32' c, 60' c Clarke 39' c Con: Hastings (4/4) 12', 33', 40', 62'; Pen: Hastings (1/1) 77'	Report	Try: Bedlow 25' c O'Conor 36' c Genge 44' c Uren 56' c Con: Sheedy (4/4) 26', 36', 44', 57'

Kingsholm
Attendance: 14,030
Referee: Wayne Barnes

15 October 2022
15:00

(1 BP) Northampton Saints	32 – 31	Newcastle Falcons (2 BP)
Try: O. Sleightholme (2) 5' m, 54' m S. Matavesi 12' m Collins 43' c Augustus 49' c Con: J. Grayson (2/5) 44', 50'; Pen: J. Grayson (1/1) 25'	Report	Try: Penny (2) 32' c, 44' c M. Carreras 61' m Blamire 65' m Wacokecoke 70' c Con: Connon (3/5) 33', 45', 71'

Franklin's Gardens
Attendance: 11,869
Referee: Jack Makepeace

15 October 2022
15:00

(1 BP) Saracens	37 – 31	Bath (2 BP)
Try: Goode 3' c Malins 42' c Daly 51' c Lewington 56' c Con: Farrell (4/4) 4', 43', 52', 58'; Pen: Farrell (3/3) 18', 35', 40+3'	Report	Try: Gallagher 8' c J. Cokanasiga 46' c Ojomoh 60' c W. White 72' c Con: O. Bailey (4/4) 9', 47', 62', 73'; Pen: O. Bailey (1/1) 16'

StoneX Stadium
Attendance: 9,010
Referee: Luke Pearce

16 October 2022
15:00

Harlequins	19 – 27	Leicester Tigers (1 BP)
Try: Murley (2) 68' c, 79' m Care 80+2' c Con: M. Smith (2/3) 69', 80+2'	Report	Try: Reffell (2) 8' m, 53' m Montoya 33' c A. Watson 76' c Con: Burns (2/4) 34', 77'; Pen: Burns (1/2) 73'

Twickenham Stoop
Attendance: 13,023
Referee: Adam Leal

Bye/s: Exeter Chiefs

=== Round 7 ===
21 October 2022
19:45

(1 BP) London Irish	21 – 22	Gloucester
Try: Creevy 2' c Loader 27' m Con: P. Jackson (1/2) 4'; Pen: P. Jackson (3/3) 15', 34', 49'	Report	Try: Socino (2) 21' m, 53' c Ackermann 30' c Con: Hastings (2/3) 31', 55'; Drop: Hastings (1/1) 62'

Gtech Community Stadium
Attendance: 9,031
Referee: Matthew Carley

22 October 2022
15:00

Bath	27 – 14	Northampton Saints
Try: M. Reid 20' c Dunn 37' c Redpath 67' c Con: Worboys (3/3) 21', 38', 69'; Pen: Worboys (2/3) 66', 74'	Report	Try: Collins 53' c S. Graham 71' c Con: J. Grayson (1/1) 54'; Furbank (1/1) 72'

Recreation Ground
Attendance: 13,412
Referee: Anthony Woodthorpe

22 October 2022
15:00

(1 BP) Exeter Chiefs	20 – 22	Saracens
Try: Penalty try 38'; Vermeulen 71' c Con: Slade (1/1) 72'; Pen: Slade (2/2) 22', 77'	Report	Try: McFarland 25' c Con: Farrell (1/1) 26'; Pen: Daly (2/2) 40+1', 66'; Farrell (2/2) 52', 57'; Goode (1/1) 80+2'

Sandy Park
Attendance: 12,666
Referee: Tom Foley

23 October 2022
15:00

Leicester Tigers	Cancelled	Wasps

Welford Road

23 October 2022
15:00

Sale Sharks	13 – 29	Harlequins
Try: S. James 16' c Con: R. du Preez (1/1) 17'; Pen: R. du Preez (2/2) 21', 47'	Report	Try: David 11' c M. Smith 38' c Con: M. Smith (2/2) 12', 40'; Pen: M. Smith (5/5) 24', 45', 54', 64', 71'

AJ Bell Stadium
Attendance: 7,484
Referee: Christophe Ridley

Bye/s: Bristol Bears
Leicester Tigers
Newcastle Falcons

=== Round 8 ===
28 October 2022
19:45

(1 BP) Gloucester	38 – 22	Exeter Chiefs
Try: Rees-Zammit 4' c S. Carreras 27' m Socino 34' c Chapman 42' c Ackermann 57' m Ludlow 77' c Con: Hastings (4/6) 5', 35', 43', 78'	Report	Try: J. Maunder 10' c Van Heerden 30' c Hodge 65' m Con: Skinner (2/2) 11', 31'; Pen: Skinner (1/1) 2'

Kingsholm
Attendance: 14,500
Referee: Adam Leal

29 October 2022
15:00

(1 BP) Harlequins	26 – 24	London Irish (1 BP)
Try: Allan (2) 43' c, 60' c Dombrandt 52' c Head 80+5' m Con: Allan (3/4) 44', 53', 61'	Report	Try: Fa'aso'o 9' c Donnell 17' c Hassell-Collins 46' c Con: P. Jackson (3/3) 10', 18', 47'; Pen: P. Jackson (1/1) 71'

Twickenham Stoop
Attendance: 12,532
Referee: Craig Maxwell-Keys

29 October 2022
15:00

(1 BP) Northampton Saints	45 – 31	Bristol Bears (1 BP)
Try: Mitchell (2) 14' c, 21' c O. Sleightholme 30' c Salakaia-Loto 33' c Proctor 44' c J. Grayson 70' c Con: F. Smith (5/5) 15', 22', 31', 34', 45'; J. Grayson (1/1) 71' c Pen: F. Smith (1/1) 28'	Report	Try: Thacker (2) 3' c, 67' c Sheedy 53' c Bradbury 59' m MacGinty 80+1' m Con: Sheedy (2/3) 4', 54'; MacGinty (1/2) 68'

Franklin's Gardens
Attendance: 12,572
Referee: Hamish Smales

30 October 2022
15:00

(1 BP) Saracens	33 – 22	Sale Sharks
Try: Goode 7' m McFarland 28' c Earl 43' m Tompkins 76' c Con: Goode (2/3) 29', 77'; Pen: Daly (2/2) 26', 47'; Goode (1/1) 38'	Report	Try: B. Curry 5' m Penalty try 16'; Carpenter 62' c Con: R. du Preez (1/2) 63'; Pen: R. du Preez (1/2) 11'

StoneX Stadium
Attendance: 8,832
Referee: Wayne Barnes

Bye/s: Bath
Leicester Tigers
Newcastle Falcons

=== Round 9 ===
4 November 2022
19:45

Northampton Saints	26 – 19	Exeter Chiefs (1 BP)
Try: Freeman (2) 31' c, 71' c Con: F. Smith (2/2) 32', 73'; Pen: F. Smith (4/4) 16', 46', 52', 67'	Report	Try: Van Heerden 9' c J. Simmonds (2) 59' m, 63' c Con: J. Simmonds (2/3) 10', 65'

Franklin's Gardens
Attendance: 12,799
Referee: Craig Maxwell-Keys

5 November 2022
13:00

Sale Sharks	27 – 17	Gloucester
Try: Carpenter 4' c T. Taylor 10' c B. Curry 21' c Con: R. du Preez (3/3) 5', 12', 22'; Pen: R. du Preez (2/2) 19', 70'	Report	Try: Socino 14' m J. Morris 26' m Clarke 75' c Con: L. Evans (1/3) 76'

AJ Bell Stadium
Attendance: 5,000
Referee: Andrew Jackson

5 November 2022
15:00

(1 BP) Newcastle Falcons	10 – 17	Bath
Try: Radwan 7' c Con: Connon (1/1) 8'; Pen: Connon (1/2) 80+1'	Report	Try: T. Hill 35' c Lawrence 60' c Con: Worboys (1/1) 36'; Searle (1/1) 61'; Pen: Searle (1/1) 54'

Kingston Park
Attendance: 4,016
Referee: Hamish Smales

5 November 2022
17:00

Bristol Bears	10 – 25	Saracens
Try: Thacker 56' m J. Benz-Salomon 79' m	Report	Try: Malins 32' c Con: Goode (1/1) 33'; Pen: Goode (6/6) 37', 40+2', 44', 49', 60', 69'

Ashton Gate
Attendance: 18,507
Referee: Jack Makepeace

Bye/s: Harlequins
Leicester Tigers
London Irish

=== Round 10 ===
11 November 2022
19:45

Bath	19 – 18	Leicester Tigers (1 BP)
Try: T. Hill 29' m Butt 80+1' m Pen: O. Bailey (3/3) 3', 57', 70'	Report	Try: Nadolo 5' c Cronin 39' m Con: Burns (1/2) 6'; Pen: Burns (2/2) 23', 66'

Recreation Ground
Attendance: 13,058
Referee: Tom Foley

12 November 2022
15:00

(1 BP) Gloucester	21 – 27	Newcastle Falcons
Try: Seabrook 38' c Jordan 63' c Penalty try 73'; Con: G. Barton (2/2) 39', 64'	Report	Try: Radwan 7' c Chick 14' c G. McGuigan 33' c Con: Connon (3/3) 9', 15', 34'; Pen: Connon (2/2) 30', 66'

Kingsholm
Attendance: 11,501
Referee: Anthony Woodthorpe

12 November 2022
17:00

Exeter Chiefs	22 – 17	London Irish (1 BP)
Try: Ewers 11' c Van Heerden 22' m Woodburn 35' c Con: J. Simmonds (2/3) 12', 36'; Pen: J. Simmonds (1/1) 54'	Report	Try: Fa'aso'o 51' c T. Pearson 77' c Con: P. Jackson (2/2) 52', 78'; Pen: P. Jackson (1/1) 8'

Sandy Park
Attendance: 9,916
Referee: Hamish Smales

13 November 2022
12:15

(1 BP) Saracens	45 – 39	Northampton Saints (2 BP)
Try: Maitland (2) 21' c, 39' c G. Simpson 61' c Hallett 64' c Earl 74' c Daly 78' c Con: Goode (5/5) 22', 40+1', 62', 65', 75'; Lozowski (1/1) 79'; Pen: Goode (1/2) 2'	Report	Try: Haywood 5' c Dingwall (3) 12' c, 32' c, 47' m Skosan 52' c Con: F. Smith (4/5) 6', 13', 33', 53'; Pen: F. Smith (2/2) 31', 38'

StoneX Stadium
Attendance: 8,475
Referee: Andrew Jackson

Bye/s: Bristol Bears
Harlequins
Sale Sharks

=== Round 11 ===
25 November 2022
19:45

Harlequins	21 – 12	Gloucester
Try: Care (2) 8' c, 37' c Lamb 15' c Con: Allan (3/3) 9', 16', 38'	Report	Try: Morgan 22' c Socino 35' m Con: S. Carreras (1/2) 23'

Twickenham Stoop
Attendance: 10,126
Referee: Wayne Barnes

25 November 2022
19:45

Newcastle Falcons	24 – 21	Exeter Chiefs (1 BP)
Try: G. McGuigan 6' c M. Carreras 19' c Pepper 40' c Con: Connon (3/3) 7', 20', 40+1'; Pen: Connon (1/1) 61'	Report	Try: Van Heerden 11' c Yeandle 37' c Sio 72' c Con: J. Simmonds (3/3) 12', 38', 73'

Kingston Park
Attendance: 3,126
Referee: Karl Dickson

26 November 2022
13:00

Sale Sharks	25 – 20	Bristol Bears (1 BP)
Try: R. du Preez 9' m Roebuck 24' c J-L. du Preez 68' c Con: R. du Preez (2/3) 25', 69'; Pen: R. du Preez (2/2) 30', 50'	Report	Try: O'Conor (2) 21' c, 33' c Con: Sheedy (2/2) 22', 35'; Pen: MacGinty (2/3) 40', 48'

AJ Bell Stadium
Attendance: 3,969
Referee: Adam Leal

27 November 2022
15:00

(1 BP) Leicester Tigers	33 – 31	London Irish (2 BP)
Try: Montoya 3' c Wigglesworth 15' m Potter 24' c Reffell 30' c J. Wiese 56' c Con: Burns (4/5) 4', 25', 31', 57'	Report	Try: Ratuniyarawa 11' c Penalty try 36'; Rogerson 48' c Hassell-Collins 50' m T. Pearson 60' m Con: P. Jackson (2/4) 12', 49'

Welford Road
Attendance: 22,000
Referee: Anthony Woodthorpe

Bye/s: Bath
Northampton Saints
Saracens

=== Round 12 ===
2 December 2022
19:45

(1 BP) Bath	13 – 19	Harlequins
Try: Butt 42' c Con: O. Bailey (1/1) 43'; Pen: O. Bailey (1/3) 11'; Francis (1/1) 56'	Report	Try: Dombrandt 6' c Beard 23' m David 53' c Con: Allan (2/3) 7', 54'

Recreation Ground
Attendance: 14,509
Referee: Andrew Brace (IRFU)

3 December 2022
15:00

(1 BP) London Irish	39 – 17	Newcastle Falcons
Try: Stokes 10' c P. Jackson 55' c Cinti (2) 60' m, 76' c Coleman 72' c Con: P. Jackson (4/5) 11', 56', 73', 77'; Pen: P. Jackson (2/2) 22', 40+1'	Report	Try: M. Carreras 15' c Pepper 50' c Con: Connon (2/2) 17', 51'; Pen: Connon (1/1) 46'

Gtech Community Stadium
Attendance: 6,858
Referee: Wayne Barnes

3 December 2022
17:30

(1 BP) Gloucester	34 – 19	Northampton Saints
Try: Singleton 13' c C. Harris 25' c S. Carreras 36' c Balmain 60' c Con: S. Carreras (4/4) 14', 26', 37', 61'; Pen: S. Carreras (2/2) 70', 79'	Report	Try: Freeman (2) 17' c, 21' m Ramm 76' c Con: F. Smith (1/2) 19'; Furbank (1/1) 76'

Kingsholm
Attendance: 11,200
Referee: Ian Tempest

3 December 2022
20:00

(1 BP) Bristol Bears	26 – 26	Leicester Tigers
Try: Radradra 5' m Piutau 24' c Byrne 65' c Ibitoye 76' c Con: Sheedy (1/2) 25'; MacGinty (2/2) 65', 77'	Report	Try: Kelly 30' m Ashton 36' m Montoya 40' c Con: Burns (1/1) 40+1'; Pen: Burns (3/3) 17', 21', 62'

Ashton Gate
Attendance: 16,186
Referee: Craig Maxwell-Keys

Bye/s: Exeter Chiefs
Sale Sharks
Saracens

=== Round 13 ===
23 December 2022
19:45

London Irish	29 – 20	Saracens
Try: Hassell-Collins 2' c Cunningham-South 78' c Con: P. Jackson (2/2) 4', 80'; Pen: P. Jackson (5/5) 20', 28', 31', 40+5', 57'	Report	Try: Pifeleti 40+1' c Maitland 45' c Con: Farrell (2/2) 40+3', 47'; Pen: Farrell (2/2) 15', 74'

Gtech Community Stadium
Attendance: 10,504
Referee: Matthew Carley

23 December 2022
19:45

Newcastle Falcons	20 – 14	Sale Sharks (1 BP)
Try: M. Carreras 55' c S. Stuart 62' c Con: Connon (2/2) 56', 63'; Pen: Connon (2/2) 43', 69'	Report	Try: Ashman 11' c O'Flaherty 25' c Con: R. du Preez (2/2) 13', 27'

Kingston Park
Attendance: 5,824
Referee: Adam Leal

24 December 2022
15:00

Exeter Chiefs	20 – 15	Bath (1 BP)
Try: Ewers 16' c Slade 32' c Con: J. Simmonds (2/2) 17', 33'; Pen: J. Simmonds (2/2) 2', 40+2'	Report	Try: J. Cokanasiga 12' c Annett 62' m Con: O. Bailey (1/2) 13'; Pen: O. Bailey (1/1) 23'

Sandy Park
Attendance: 13,537
Referee: Tom Foley

24 December 2022
15:00

Leicester Tigers	28 – 13 (Note: Leicester won the inaugural editions of the Slater Cup.)	Gloucester
Try: G. Porter 44' c A. Watson (2) 58' c, 66' m Con: Burns (2/3) 45', 59'; Pen: Burns (3/3) 13', 19', 54'	Report	Try: Tuisue 40+2' m May 79' m Pen: Hastings (1/2) 8'

Welford Road
Attendance: 22,000
Referee: Christophe Ridley

27 December 2022
16:15

(1 BP) Harlequins	12 – 15	Bristol Bears
Try: Bassett 20' m Murley 58' c Con: Allan (1/2) 60'	Report	Try: Thacker 16' c Ibitoye 39' m Con: MacGinty (1/2) 17'; Pen: MacGinty (1/1) 3'

Twickenham Stoop (Note: Match relocated from its original venue, Twickenham Stadium, in response to industrial action.)
Attendance: 11,790
Referee: Karl Dickson

Bye/s: Northampton Saints

=== Round 14 ===
30 December 2022
19:45

(1 BP) Sale Sharks	40 – 5	Leicester Tigers
Try: O'Flaherty 35' c McIntyre 53' c Penalty try 67'; Ashman 77' m R. du Preez 80' m Con: R. du Preez (2/3) 36', 54'; Pen: R. du Preez (3/3) 18', 25', 32'	Report	Try: Pollard 47' m

AJ Bell Stadium
Attendance: 9,491
Referee: Matthew Carley

31 December 2022
15:00

Bath	24 – 16	Newcastle Falcons
Try: Lawrence 13' c T. Hill 48' c B. Spencer 56' c Con: O. Bailey (3/3) 14', 49', 57'; Pen: O. Bailey (1/1) 79'	Report	Try: Blamire 27' c Con: Connon (1/1) 28'; Pen: Connon (3/4) 18', 45', 60'

Recreation Ground
Attendance: 14,000
Referee: Jack Makepeace

31 December 2022
15:00

(1 BP) Saracens	35 – 3	Exeter Chiefs
Try: Christie 10' c Maitland 23' m Riccioni 40' c Lewington 72' m Tompkins 80+1' m Con: Farrell (2/5) 11', 40+2'; Pen: Farrell (2/2) 45', 50'	Report	Pen: J. Simmonds (1/1) 22'

StoneX Stadium
Attendance: 10,500
Referee: Craig Maxwell-Keys

31 December 2022
15:00

Gloucester	8 – 6	London Irish (1 BP)
Try: Alemanno 11' m Pen: S. Carreras (1/1) 80+3'	Report	Pen: P. Jackson (2/2) 28', 73'

Kingsholm
Attendance: 16,000
Referee: Adam Leal

1 January 2023
15:00

(1 BP) Northampton Saints	46 – 17	Harlequins
Try: A. Waller 4' c Ramm (2) 17' c, 40+2' m Salakaia-Loto 54' c Furbank 69' c Hutchinson 75' c Con: F. Smith (2/3) 5', 18'; Furbank (3/3) 55', 70', 76'; Pen: Furbank (2/2) 43', 48'	Report	Try: Els 67' c David 79' c Con: Edwards (2/2) 67', 79'; Pen: Allan (1/1) 23'

Franklin's Gardens
Attendance: 15,153
Referee: Luke Pearce

Bye/s: Bristol Bears

=== Round 15 ===
6 January 2023
19:45

(1 BP) Gloucester	16 – 19	Saracens
Try: Thorley 16' c Con: S. Carreras (1/1) 17'; Pen: S. Carreras (3/4) 35', 45', 73'	Report	Try: Malins 7' m Van Zyl 66' m Pen: Farrell (2/4) 24', 38'; Drop: Farrell (1/1) 80+1'

Kingsholm
Attendance: 13,417
Referee: Karl Dickson

7 January 2023
14:00

(1 BP) Newcastle Falcons	45 – 26	Leicester Tigers (1 BP)
Try: M. Carreras (3) 14' c, 36' c, 38' c Chick 28' c Blamire 56' c Moroni 74' c Con: Connon (6/6) 15', 29', 37', 39', 57', 75'; Pen: Connon (1/1) 46'	Report	Try: Youngs 32' m O. Chessum 42' c Gopperth 72' c Jansen 80+2' c Con: C. Atkinson (3/4) 43', 73', 80+3'

Kingston Park
Attendance: 6,122
Referee: Tom Foley

7 January 2023
16:30

(1 BP) Exeter Chiefs	35 – 12	Northampton Saints
Try: S. Simmonds 3' c Woodburn 15' c Cowan-Dickie (2) 29' c, 44' c Slade 56' c Con: J. Simmonds (5/5) 4', 17', 30', 45', 57'	Report	Try: Dingwall 48' c Proctor 65' m Con: Furbank (1/2) 49'

Sandy Park
Attendance: 8,215
Referee: Adam Leal

8 January 2023
15:00

Harlequins	16 – 24	Sale Sharks (1 BP)
Try: Marchant 42' m David 74' m Pen: Allan (2/2) 5', 31'	Report	Try: O'Flaherty 18' c R. du Preez 24' c A. van der Merwe 53' m C. Wiese 62' m Con: R. du Preez (2/4) 19', 26'

Twickenham Stoop
Attendance: 10,383
Referee: Wayne Barnes

8 January 2023
15:00

London Irish	23 – 7	Bristol Bears
Try: Janse van Rensburg 28' c B. White 40+3' c Con: Jennings (2/2) 29', 40+5'; Pen: Jennings (3/4) 8', 42', 75'	Report	Try: Thacker 20' c Con: MacGinty (1/1) 21'

Gtech Community Stadium
Attendance: 7,026
Referee: Christophe Ridley

Bye/s: Bath

=== Round 16 ===
27 January 2023
19:45

(1 BP) Sale Sharks	30 – 27	Bath (1 BP)
Try: Carpenter 2' m Dugdale 17' c Roebuck 25' m T. Taylor 32' m Reed 80+1' m Con: R. du Preez (1/5) 18'; Pen: R. du Preez (1/3) 50'	Report	Try: Annett 40+3' c J. Joseph 43' c B. Spencer 66' c Con: B. Spencer (3/3) 40+4', 44', 67'; Pen: B. Spencer (2/2) 6', 60'

AJ Bell Stadium
Attendance: 6,750
Referee: Karl Dickson

28 January 2023
14:00

(1 BP) Leicester Tigers	18 – 19	Northampton Saints
Try: Potter (2) 8' c, 46' m Con: Pollard (1/1) 10'; Pen: Pollard (1/1) 20'; Burns (1/1) 63'	Report	Try: O. Sleightholme 50' c Con: Furbank (1/1) 51'; Pen: Furbank (4/5) 13', 29', 33', 43'

Welford Road
Attendance: 25,849
Referee: Wayne Barnes

28 January 2023
15:00

Saracens	20 – 19	Bristol Bears (1 BP)
Try: Dan 58' c Segun 77' m Hougaard 80+3' m Con: Goode (1/3) 59'; Pen: Goode (1/2) 52'	Report	Try: Thacker 37' m Ibitoye 71' m Pen: MacGinty (1/2) 12'; J. Williams (2/2) 49', 55'

StoneX Stadium
Attendance: 9,019
Referee: Anthony Woodthorpe

28 January 2022
16:30

Exeter Chiefs	24 – 17	Gloucester (1 BP)
Try: Gray 11' c Kata 18' c Woodburn 35' c Con: Skinner (3/3) 12', 20', 36'; Pen: Skinner (1/1) 56'	Report	Try: May 15' c Rapava-Ruskin 30' c Con: Twelvetrees (2/2) 17', 31'; Pen: S. Carreras (1/1) 80+1'

Sandy Park
Attendance: 11,078
Referee: Tom Foley

29 January 2022
15:00

(1 BP) London Irish	42 – 24	Harlequins (1 BP)
Try: Cunningham-South 4' c Dykes (3) 6' c, 39' c, 44' c Stokes 21' c T. Pearson 72' c Con: P. Jackson (6/6) 5', 8', 22', 40+1', 45', 74'	Report	Try: Penalty try 20'; Allan 27' m Bassett 52' m Lamb 62' c Con: Allan (1/3) 63'

Gtech Community Stadium
Attendance: 13,351
Referee: Matthew Carley

Bye/s: Newcastle Falcons

=== Round 17 ===
17 February 2023
19:45

(1 BP) Bristol Bears	30 – 12	Newcastle Falcons
Try: Randall (2) 10' m, 42' c Vui 21' c Harding 80+2' m Con: J. Williams (2/4) 22', 43'; Pen: J. Williams (2/2) 40+2', 69'	Report	Try: G. Graham 16' c Blamire 58' m Con: Connon (1/2) 17'

Ashton Gate
Attendance: 16,784
Referee: Karl Dickson

17 February 2023
19:45

(1 BP) Gloucester	28 – 26	Harlequins (2 BP)
Try: Blake 5' c Thorley 17' c S. Carreras 71' c Rees-Zammit 76' c Con: S. Carreras (4/4) 6', 18', 73', 77'	Report	Try: Lawday 11' c Murley 51' m Riley 61' c Jurevicius 80+1' c Con: Allan (3/4) 13', 62', 80+2'

Kingsholm
Attendance: 16,600
Referee: Luke Pearce

18 February 2023
15:00

Bath	10 – 25	London Irish
Try: Bayliss 22' c Con: B. Spencer (1/1) 22'; Pen: B. Spencer (1/2) 29'	Report	Try: P. Jackson 24' c B. White 40' m Janse van Rensburg 59' c Con: P. Jackson (2/3) 26', 60'; Pen: P. Jackson (2/2) 54', 69'

Recreation Ground
Attendance: 14,509
Referee: Anthony Woodthorpe

18 February 2023
15:00

(1 BP) Northampton Saints	38 – 34	Sale Sharks (2 BP)
Try: T. James 24' c Freeman 49' c Proctor 57' m Penalty try 66'; Braley 74' c Dingwall 77' m Con: F. Smith (2/3) 25', 50'; Hutchinson (1/2) 74'	Report	Try: Reed 9' m T. Curry 18' c R. du Preez 22' c Ashman 40+1' m Dugdale 62' c Con: R. du Preez (3/5) 19', 23', 64'; Pen: R. du Preez (1/1) 45'

Franklin's Gardens
Attendance: 13,827
Referee: Ian Tempest

19 February 2023
15:00

Leicester Tigers	24 – 18	Saracens (1 BP)
Try: Pollard 5' c Henderson 12' c Brown 27' c Con: Pollard (3/3) 6', 13', 29'; Pen: Pollard (1/1) 37'	Report	Try: Mawi 40+3' c Lewington 49' m Con: Goode (1/2) 40+3'; Pen: Goode (2/2) 17', 47'

Welford Road
Attendance: 20,451
Referee: Tom Foley

Bye/s: Exeter Chiefs

=== Round 18 ===
24 February 2023
19:45

(1 BP) Bath	13 – 15	Bristol Bears
Try: M. Reid 33' c Con: Francis (1/1) 34'; Pen: Francis (2/5) 38', 54'	Report	Try: J. Williams 19' c Naulago 42' m Con: MacGinty (1/2) 20'; Pen: MacGinty (1/1) 66'

Recreation Ground
Attendance: 14,509
Referee: Matthew Carley

25 February 2023
14:30

(1 BP) Saracens	29 – 23	Newcastle Falcons (1 BP)
Try: Mawi 2' m Lewington (2) 15' m, 23' m Van Zyl 31' c Dan 39' c Con: Goode (2/5) 32', 40'	Report	Try: Van der Walt 11' c Radwan 71' c Con: Connon (2/2) 12', 72'; Pen: Connon (3/3) 6', 26', 80+3'

StoneX Stadium
Attendance: 6,591
Referee: Craig Maxwell-Keys

25 February 2023
14:45

(1 BP) Northampton Saints	41 – 34	Gloucester (2 BP)
Try: A. Waller 23' c Braley 43' c A. Moon 50' m S. Graham 54' c Freeman 59' m Dingwall 69' c Con: J. Grayson (4/6) 24', 43', 55', 69'; Pen: J. Grayson (1/2) 7'	Report	Try: Blake (2) 14' m, 40' m Thorley 46' m Ford-Robinson (2) 75' m, 80+3' c Alemanno 79' c Con: Twelvetrees (2/3) 79', 80+4'

Franklin's Gardens
Attendance: 13,431
Referee: Adam Leal

25 February 2022
19:30

(1 BP) London Irish	22 – 25	Leicester Tigers
Try: T. Pearson 5' c Powell 9' c Cunningham-South 63' m Con: P. Jackson (2/3) 5', 9'; Pen: P. Jackson (1/1) 25'	Report	Try: Cracknell 2' c J. Wiese 20' c Potter 57' m Con: Pollard (2/3) 3', 21'; Pen: Pollard (2/3) 67', 72'

Gtech Community Stadium
Attendance: 6,353
Referee: Jack Makepeace

26 February 2023
13:00

Exeter Chiefs	24 – 22	Sale Sharks (1 BP)
Try: H. Williams 25' c Hodge (2) 33' c, 36' c Con: Skinner (3/3) 26', 34', 37'; Pen: Skinner (1/1) 69'	Report	Try: Roebuck 15' c Ashman 50' c Dugdale 67' m Con: R. du Preez (2/3) 17', 51'; Pen: R. du Preez (1/1) 12'

Sandy Park
Attendance: 9,336
Referee: Luke Pearce

Bye/s: Harlequins

=== Round 19 ===
3 March 2023
19:45

(1 BP) Bristol Bears	62 – 8	Northampton Saints
Try: Randall (2) 20' c, 33' m Thacker 24' c I. Lloyd (2) 40+1' m, 43' c Vui 51' c Kloska 60' c Harding 68' c Heenan 74' c Con: MacGinty (4/6) 21', 25', 44', 51'; J. Williams (3/3) 61', 69', 75'; Pen: MacGinty (1/1) 11'	Report	Try: Hendy 56' m Pen: F. Smith (1/1) 8'

Ashton Gate
Attendance: 16,686
Referee: Ian Tempest

4 March 2023
15:00

(1 BP) Leicester Tigers	48 – 27	Bath (1 BP)
Try: Potter 16' c Pollard 23' c Montoya (2) 27' c, 65' c Liebenberg 39' c Wells 74' c Con: Pollard (5/5) 17', 24', 28', 40', 66'; C. Atkinson (1/1) 74'; Pen: Pollard (2/2) 34', 54'	Report	Try: Gallagher 11' m B. Spencer 35' m McNally 44' c Lee-Warner 76' c Con: B. Spencer (2/4) 45', 77'; Pen: B. Spencer (1/1) 30'

Welford Road
Attendance: 22,220
Referee: Karl Dickson

4 March 2023
17:15

(1 BP) Harlequins	40 – 5	Exeter Chiefs
Try: Murley 11' c Bassett 23' c Riley 29' m Marchant (2) 32' c, 57' c Lewies 65' c Con: M. Smith (5/6) 12', 24', 33', 59', 66'	Report	Try: Innard 46' m

Twickenham (Note: Match relocated from its original venue, Twickenham Stoop, in response to industrial action.)
Attendance: 54,669
Referee: Matthew Carley

5 March 2023
15:00

Newcastle Falcons	19 – 34	London Irish (1 BP)
Try: Dalton 30' c Blamire 38' c Fearns 49' m Con: Connon (2/3) 31', 40'	Report	Try: Basham 3' c T. Pearson 18' c Fischetti 27' m Cornish 53' c Hassell-Collins 61' m Con: P. Jackson (3/5) 4', 19', 54'; Pen: P. Jackson (1/1) 79'

Kingston Park
Attendance: 8,682
Referee: Christophe Ridley

5 March 2023
15:00

(1 BP) Sale Sharks	35 – 24	Saracens
Try: Carpenter (2) 32' c, 54' c S. James 40' c Ross 61' c J-L. du Preez 80' c Con: R. du Preez (5/5) 33', 40+1', 55', 62', 80+1'	Report	Try: Lewington 20' m Dan 27' m Pifeleti 66' m Pen: Goode (2/2) 5', 17'; Man. Vunipola (1/1) 36'

AJ Bell Stadium
Attendance: 10,136
Referee: Tom Foley

Bye/s: Gloucester

=== Round 20 ===
10 March 2023
19:45

(1 BP) Northampton Saints	45 – 26	Bath (1 BP)
Try: R. Smith (2) 13' c, 52' c Augustus 19' c Scott-Young 46' c Collins 68' c J. Grayson 77' c Con: F. Smith (6/6) 15', 20', 47', 54', 69', 78'; Pen: F. Smith (1/1) 37'	Report	Try: De Glanville 8' c Dunn (2) 25' c, 63' m Doughty 75' c Con: B. Spencer (1/1) 9'; O. Bailey (2/3) 26', 76'

Franklin's Gardens
Attendance: 13,152
Referee: Jack Makepeace

11 March 2023
14:30

(1 BP) Exeter Chiefs	24 – 5	Newcastle Falcons
Try: Frost 25' m Nowell 58' c Penalty try 62'; S. Simmonds 72' m Con: Skinner (1/3) 58'	Report	Try: M. Carreras 21' m

Sandy Park
Attendance: 9,188
Referee: Tom Foley

12 March 2023
13:00

Gloucester	5 – 26	Leicester Tigers (1 BP)
Try: May 63' m	Report	Try: Brown 55' m Montoya 59' c Youngs 72' c J. Wiese 80+1' c Con: Pollard (3/4) 60', 73', 80+3'

Kingsholm
Attendance: 13,623
Referee: Ian Tempest

12 March 2023
13:00

(1 BP) London Irish	36 – 18	Sale Sharks
Try: O'Sullivan 16' m Creevy 31' c Cinti 34' c Haffar 75' c Stokes 78' c Con: P. Jackson (4/5) 32', 35', 76', 78'; Pen: P. Jackson (1/2) 3'	Report	Try: J-L. du Preez 37' c Dugdale 54' m Con: R. du Preez (1/2) 38'; Pen: R. du Preez (1/1) 20'; Ford (1/1) 67'

Gtech Community Stadium
Attendance: 5,630
Referee: Matthew Carley

12 March 2023
15:00

(1 BP) Bristol Bears	51 – 26	Harlequins (1 BP)
Try: Thacker (2) 6' c, 17' c Ibitoye 13' c Radradra 24' c Randall 59' c Piutau (2) 61' m, 64' m Con: MacGinty (4/4) 7', 14', 18', 24'; J. Williams (1/3) 59'; Pen: MacGinty (1/1) 31'; J. Williams (1/1) 49'	Report	Try: Kenningham (2) 9' c, 56' c Bassett 27' m Murley 68' c Con: Edwards (3/4) 10', 57', 69'

Ashton Gate
Attendance: 17,587
Referee: Adam Leal

Bye/s: Saracens

=== Round 21 ===
24 March 2023
19:45

Newcastle Falcons	17 – 12	Gloucester (1 BP)
Try: Radwan 13' c Obatoyinbo 63' c Con: Connon (2/2) 14', 65'; Pen: Connon (1/2) 40+1'	Report	Try: Blake 6' m Thorley 18' c Con: S. Carreras (1/2) 19'

Kingston Park
Attendance: 6,127
Referee: Adam Leal

25 March 2023
12:30

(1 BP) Leicester Tigers	46 – 24	Bristol Bears
Try: Youngs 16' c A. Watson 31' m Montoya (2) 52' c, 59' c Pollard 67' c Clare 80' c Con: Pollard (4/5) 17', 53', 60', 67'; Gopperth (1/1) 80'; Pen: Pollard (2/2) 28', 72'	Report	Try: Thacker 10' c Ibitoye 48' c Randall 70' c Con: MacGinty (2/2) 11', 49'; Ibitoye (1/1) 70'; Pen: MacGinty (1/1) 38'

Welford Road
Attendance: 21,523
Referee: Matthew Carley

25 March 2023
15:00

(1 BP) Saracens	36 – 24	Harlequins (1 BP)
Try: Lozowski 8' c Tompkins 13' c Christie 37' m Maitland 57' c Itoje 65' c Con: Farrell (4/5) 8', 15', 58', 67'; Pen: Farrell (1/1) 21'	Report	Try: Dombrandt 2' c Murley (2) 44' c, 61' m Marchant 73' m Con: M. Smith (2/4) 3', 45'

Tottenham Hotspur Stadium (Note: Saracens would also play one home game at Tottenham Hotspur Stadium on 25 March 2023.)
Attendance: 55,109
Referee: Luke Pearce

25 March 2023
17:30

(1 BP) London Irish	37 – 22	Northampton Saints
Try: Fa'aso'o 7' c T. Pearson 18' c Loader 42' c Munga 65' c Con: P. Jackson (4/4) 8', 19', 43', 66'; Pen: P. Jackson (2/3) 40', 79; Drop: P. Jackson (1/1) 71'	Report	Try: Augustus 32' c Freeman 61' c Ludlam 73' m Con: F. Smith (1/1) 33'; Hutchinson (1/2) 61'; Pen: F. Smith (1/1) 11'

Gtech Community Stadium
Attendance: 13,543
Referee: Anthony Woodthorpe

26 March 2023
15:00

(1 BP) Bath	36 – 19	Exeter Chiefs
Try: Redpath 8' c Obano 35' c J. Cokanasiga 38' m Dunn 46' c Lawrence 54' c Con: B. Spencer (4/5) 9', 36', 47', 55'; Pen: Francis (1/1) 74'	Report	Try: Kata 11' c Sio 23' c Yeandle 58' m Con: Slade (2/3) 12', 24'

Recreation Ground
Attendance: 14,509
Referee: Karl Dickson

Bye/s: Sale Sharks

=== Round 22 ===
14 April 2023
19:45

Bristol Bears	20 – 36	Sale Sharks
Try: Naulago 40' c Ibitoye 73' c Con: MacGinty (2/2) 40+1', 74'; Pen: MacGinty (1/1) 10'; J. Williams (1/1) 25'	Report	Try: B. Curry 32' c J-L. du Preez 48' c Warr 69' c Con: Ford (3/3) 33', 49', 70'; Pen: Ford (4/4) 3', 19', 23', 53'; Drop: Ford (1/1) 28'

Ashton Gate
Attendance: 16,907
Referee: Luke Pearce

14 April 2023
19:45

Gloucester	24 – 33	Bath (1 BP)
Try: Varney 6' c S. Carreras 27' c S. Atkinson 44' c Con: S. Carreras (3/3) 7', 28', 45'; Pen: S. Carreras (1/3) 12'	Report	Try: Penalty try 30'; M. Reid (2) 39' c, 61' c J. Cokanasiga 57' m Underhill 68' c Con: B. Spencer (3/4) 40', 62', 69'

Kingsholm
Attendance: 16,500
Referee: Christophe Ridley

15 April 2023
15:00

(1 BP) Harlequins	48 – 20	Newcastle Falcons
Try: Esterhuizen 37' c Lynagh 40+3' m Bassett 49' m Dombrandt (2) 53' m, 69' c Lamb 72' c Marchant 74' c Baxter 80' m Con: M. Smith (4/7) 38', 69', 72', 76'	Report	Try: M. Carreras 27' c Lockwood 66' c Con: Connon (2/2) 27', 68'; Pen: Connon (2/2) 28', 44'

Twickenham Stoop
Attendance: 12,045
Referee: Matthew Carley

15 April 2023
15:00

(1 BP) Northampton Saints	38 – 29	Saracens (1 BP)
Try: A. Moon 19' m Ludlam 22' c Freeman 36' c Hutchinson 43' c F. Smith 50' m Dingwall 63' c Con: F. Smith (4/6) 23', 37', 43', 64'	Report	Try: Segun (2) 4' c, 80' m Man. Vunipola 55' c Dan 68' c Con: Man. Vunipola (3/4) 5', 56', 69'; Pen: Man. Vunipola (1/1) 16'

Franklin's Gardens
Attendance: 15,153
Referee: Wayne Barnes

16 April 2023
15:00

(1 BP) Leicester Tigers	62 – 19	Exeter Chiefs
Try: Kelly 5' c Van Poortvliet 9' c Ashton (3) 40+3' m, 50' m, 70' c Penalty try 43'; Martin 55' c Scott (2) 63' c, 76' c Con: Pollard (4/6) 6', 10', 56', 64'; Gopperth (2/2) 71', 76'; Pen: Pollard (1/2) 32'	Report	Try: S. Simmonds 15' m Hogg 34' c Tuima 79' c Con: J. Simmonds (1/2) 35'; Skinner (1/1) 79'

Welford Road
Attendance: 22,189
Referee: Karl Dickson

Bye/s: London Irish

=== Round 23 ===
21 April 2023
19:45

Newcastle Falcons	5 – 66	Northampton Saints (1 BP)
Try: Radwan 4' m	Report	Try: Mitchell (2) 8' c, 56' c Collins (2) 16' c, 30' c Augustus 40' c P. Hill 44' c F. Smith 53' c S. Graham 59' m Freeman 64' m Ribbans 75' c Con: F. Smith (8/10) 8', 17', 31', 40+1', 46', 54', 57', 76'

Kingston Park
Attendance: 6,847
Referee: Wayne Barnes

22 April 2023
15:00

Exeter Chiefs	22 – 21	Bristol Bears (1 BP)
Try: Whitten 26' c Ewers 37' m Iosefa-Scott 71' c Con: J. Simmonds (2/3) 27', 71'; Pen: J. Simmonds (1/1) 79'	Report	Try: Kloska 20' c J. Jenkins 45' c Y. Thomas 54' c Con: Sheedy (3/3) 21', 46', 54'

Sandy Park
Attendance: 13,457
Referee: Craig Maxwell-Keys

22 April 2023
15:00

(1 BP) Harlequins	35 – 45	Bath (1 BP)
Try: Murley 7' c Wallace 24' c M. Smith 36' c Gjaltema 56' c Dombrandt 71' c Con: M. Smith (5/5) 8', 24', 37', 57', 72'	Report	Try: Dunn 4' c Van Velze 33' c Lawrence 39' c Annett 66' c J. Cokanasiga 69' c Ojomoh 76' c Con: B. Spencer (5/5) 5', 34', 40', 67', 70'; Francis (1/1) 77'; Pen: B. Spencer (1/1) 14'

Twickenham Stadium
Attendance: 44,148
Referee: Karl Dickson

22 April 2023
17:30

(1 BP) Gloucester	22 – 25	Sale Sharks
Try: Ludlow 48' c Rees-Zammit 57' c May 80+3' m Con: Hastings (2/2) 49', 58'; Pen: Hastings (1/2) 32'	Report	Try: J-L. du Preez 35' c Ross 59' c S. James 74' m Con: Ford (2/3) 36', 61'; Pen: Ford (2/2) 23', 64'

Kingsholm
Attendance: 12,672
Referee: Tom Foley

23 April 2023
15:00

(1 BP) Saracens	45 – 21	London Irish
Try: Goode 40+1' c Maitland 43' c Dan 62' c Mawi (2) 66' m, 77' c Con: Farrell (4/5) 40+3', 45', 63', 78'; Pen: Farrell (4/4) 27', 36', 59', 72'	Report	Try: Rogerson 14' c Willemse 79' m Con: P. Jackson (1/2) 15'; Pen: P. Jackson (3/3) 5', 50', 53'

StoneX Stadium
Attendance: 9,701
Referee: Adam Leal

Bye/s: Leicester Tigers

=== Round 24 ===
6 May 2023
16:00

(1 BP) Bath	61 – 29	Saracens (1 BP)
Try: M. Reid 3' c Dunn (3) 12' c, 51' c, 55' c Obano (2) 33' c, 42' c Cloete 67' c O. Bailey 73' c Lawrence 80+2' m Con: B. Spencer (7/7) 4', 14', 35', 43', 52', 56', 67'; O. Bailey (1/2) 74'	Report	Try: Segun 7' m Hartley (2) 17' c, 26' c Lewis 39' m Man. Vunipola 58' m Con: Man. Vunipola (2/5) 18', 27'

Recreation Ground
Attendance: 14,509
Referee: Jack Makepeace

6 May 2023
16:00

(1 BP) Bristol Bears	36 – 21	Gloucester
Try: Naulago 10' c Thacker 15' c Bradbury 48' m Radradra (2) 55' c, 77' c Con: MacGinty (4/5) 11', 16', 56', 78'; Pen: MacGinty (1/1) 22'	Report	Try: Thorley 17' c May 68' c Penalty try 80+4'; Con: Hastings (1/1) 18'; Twelvetrees (1/1) 68'

Ashton Gate
Attendance: 21,075
Referee: Wayne Barnes

6 May 2023
16:00

(1 BP) Leicester Tigers	17 – 20	Harlequins
Try: Montoya 15' c Reffell 76' c Con: Pollard (1/1) 16'; Gopperth (1/1) 77'; Pen: Pollard (1/1) 45'	Report	Try: Penalty try 12'; Murley 21' c Con: M. Smith (1/1) 22'; Pen: M. Smith (2/2) 40+2', 70'

Welford Road
Attendance: 25,849
Referee: Ian Tempest

6 May 2023
16:00

London Irish	17 – 14	Exeter Chiefs (1 BP)
Try: González (2) 28' c, 70' m T. Pearson 61' m Con: P. Jackson (1/3) 28'	Report	Try: Vermeulen 16' c Hendrickson 64' c Con: Slade (2/2) 16', 65'

Gtech Community Stadium
Attendance: 11,576
Referee: Luke Pearce

6 May 2023
16:00

(1 BP) Sale Sharks	54 – 12	Newcastle Falcons
Try: Roebuck 9' c S. James (2) 20' c, 79' m B. Curry 32' c Rodd 44' c Quirke 53' c Penalty try 70'; Reed 73' c Con: Ford (6/6) 10', 21', 33', 45', 55', 75'	Report	Try: Rubiolo 4' c Blamire 80+3' m Con: Connon (1/1) 4'

AJ Bell Stadium
Attendance: 7,500
Referee: Sara Cox

Bye/s: Northampton Saints

== Play-offs ==
As in previous seasons, the top four teams in the Premiership table, following the conclusion of the regular season, contested the play-off semi-finals on 13 and 14 May 2023, in a 1st vs 4th and 2nd vs 3rd format, with the higher ranking team having home advantage. The dates and times for the two play-off semi-finals were announced on 23 April 2023, after the qualifying teams were confirmed at the end of the regular season's penultimate round. The two winners of the semi-finals met in the Premiership Final at Twickenham on 27 May 2023.

Semi-finals
13 May 2023 – StoneX Stadium
Saracens	38
Northampton Saints	15
14 May 2023 – AJ Bell Stadium
Sale Sharks	21
Leicester Tigers	13

Final
27 May 2023 – Twickenham
Saracens	35
Sale Sharks	25

=== Semi-finals ===
13 May 2023
15:30

Saracens (1)	38 – 15	(4) Northampton Saints
Try: Maitland (2) 6' c, 22' c Van Zyl 30' c Penalty try 71'; Malins 75' c Con: Farrell (4/4) 7', 24', 31', 77'; Pen: Farrell (1/1) 47'	Report	Try: Mitchell 56' c Ramm 65' m Con: F. Smith (1/2) 56'; Pen: F. Smith (1/1) 9'

StoneX Stadium
Attendance: 10,260
Referee: Karl Dickson

Team details

FB	15	(England) Alex Goode		(substituted off) 66'
RW	14	(England) Max Malins
OC	13	(England) Alex Lozowski
IC	12	(Wales) Nick Tompkins		(substituted off) 66'
LW	11	(Scotland) Sean Maitland
FH	10	(England) Owen Farrell (c)
SH	9	(South Africa) Ivan van Zyl		(substituted off) 75'
N8	8	(England) Jackson Wray
OF	7	(England) Ben Earl
BF	6	(England) Nick Isiekwe		(substituted off) 49'
RL	5	(England) Hugh Tizard		(substituted off) 75'
LL	4	(England) Maro Itoje	(yellow card) 79'
TP	3	(Italy) Marco Riccioni		(substituted off) 74'
HK	2	(England) Jamie George		(substituted off) 72'
LP	1	(England) Mako Vunipola		(substituted off) 69'
Substitutions:
HK	16	(England) Theo Dan		(substituted on) 72'
PR	17	(Fiji) Eroni Mawi		(substituted on) 69'
PR	18	(England) Christian Judge		(substituted on) 74'
LK	19	(Scotland) Callum Hunter-Hill		(substituted on) 49'
FL	20	(England) Toby Knight		(substituted on) 75'
SH	21	(United States) Ruben de Haas		(substituted on) 75'
CE	22	(Scotland) Duncan Taylor		(substituted on) 66'
FB	23	(England) Elliot Daly		(substituted on) 66'
Coach:
(Ireland) Mark McCall

FB	15	(England) George Furbank
RW	14	(Australia) James Ramm
OC	13	(England) Fraser Dingwall		(substituted off) 66'	(substituted on) 69'
IC	12	(Scotland) Rory Hutchinson
LW	11	(England) Tommy Freeman
FH	10	(England) Fin Smith
SH	9	(England) Alex Mitchell		(substituted off) 66'
N8	8	(South Africa) Juarno Augustus		(substituted off) 58'
OF	7	(England) Lewis Ludlam (c)
BF	6	(England) Courtney Lawes		(substituted off) 72'
RL	5	(England) Alex Moon		(substituted off) 57'
LL	4	(England) David Ribbans
TP	3	(England) Trevor Davison		(substituted off) 50'
HK	2	(England) Tom Cruse		(substituted off) 50'
LP	1	(England) Alex Waller		(substituted off) 41'
Substitutions:
HK	16	(Scotland) Robbie Smith		(substituted on) 50'
PR	17	(England) Ethan Waller		(substituted on) 41'
PR	18	(England) Paul Hill		(substituted on) 50'
LK	19	(Australia) Lukhan Salakaia-Loto		(substituted on) 57'
FL	20	(Australia) Angus Scott-Young		(substituted on) 72'
FL	21	(England) Sam Graham		(substituted on) 58'
SH	22	(England) Tom James	(yellow card) 71'	(substituted on) 66'
WG	23	(England) Tom Collins		(substituted on) 66'	(substituted off) 69'
Coach:
(England) Phil Dowson

Player of the Match:
(South Africa) Ivan van Zyl (Saracens)
Assistant referees:
Sara Cox
Ian Tempest
Television Match Official:
Stuart Terheege

14 May 2023
15:00

Sale Sharks (2)	21 – 13	(3) Leicester Tigers
Try: Roebuck 20' c Reed 64' m Con: Ford (1/2) 21'; Pen: Ford (3/3) 47', 57', 69'	Report	Try: Potter 54' c Con: Gopperth (1/1) 55'; Pen: Gopperth (2/3) 8', 11'

AJ Bell Stadium
Attendance: 9,980
Referee: Wayne Barnes

Team details

FB	15	(England) Joe Carpenter
RW	14	(England) Tom Roebuck
OC	13	(South Africa) Robert du Preez
IC	12	(England) Manu Tuilagi	(substituted off) 55'
LW	11	(England) Arron Reed
FH	10	(England) George Ford
SH	9	(England) Gus Warr	(substituted off) 51'
N8	8	(South Africa) Jono Ross
OF	7	(England) Ben Curry (c)	(substituted off) 29'
BF	6	(England) Tom Curry	(substituted off) 72'
RL	5	(England) Jonny Hill
LL	4	(South Africa) Jean-Luc du Preez
TP	3	(South Africa) Nick Schonert	(substituted off) 47'
HK	2	(South Africa) Akker van der Merwe	(substituted off) 56'
LP	1	(England) Simon McIntyre	(substituted off) 47'
Substitutions:
HK	16	(Scotland) Ewan Ashman	(substituted on) 56'
PR	17	(England) Bevan Rodd	(substituted on) 47'
PR	18	(South Africa) Coenie Oosthuizen	(substituted on) 47'
LK	19	(England) Josh Beaumont	(substituted on) 72'
N8	20	(South Africa) Dan du Preez	(substituted on) 29'	(substituted off) 74'
SH	21	(England) Raffi Quirke	(substituted on) 51'
CE	22	(England) Sam James	(substituted on) 55'
WG	23	(England) Tom O'Flaherty		(substituted on) 74'
Coach:
(England) Alex Sanderson

FB	15	(England) Freddie Steward
RW	14	(England) Anthony Watson
OC	13	(Scotland) Matt Scott		(substituted off) 67'
IC	12	(England) Dan Kelly
LW	11	(England) Harry Potter
FH	10	(New Zealand) Jimmy Gopperth		(substituted off) 70'
SH	9	(England) Ben Youngs		(substituted off) 37'
N8	8	(South Africa) Jasper Wiese		(substituted off) 72'
OF	7	(Wales) Tommy Reffell
BF	6	(South Africa) Hanro Liebenberg
RL	5	(Scotland) Cameron Henderson		(substituted off) 70'
LL	4	(England) George Martin
TP	3	(England) Dan Cole	(yellow card) 36'	(substituted off) 57'
HK	2	(Argentina) Julián Montoya (c)
LP	1	(England) Tom West		(substituted off) 52'
Substitutions:
HK	16	(England) Charlie Clare
PR	17	(Ireland) James Cronin		(substituted on) 52'
PR	18	(England) Joe Heyes		(substituted on) 57'
LK	19	(England) Harry Wells		(substituted on) 70'
N8	20	(Wales) Olly Cracknell		(substituted on) 72'
SH	21	(England) Jack van Poortvliet		(substituted on) 37'
FH	22	(England) Charlie Atkinson		(substituted on) 70'
CE	23	(England) Guy Porter		(substituted on) 67'
Coach:
(England) Richard Wigglesworth

Player of the Match:
(England) George Ford (Sale Sharks)
Assistant referees:
Jack Makepeace
Luke Pearce
Television Match Official:
Tom Foley

=== Final ===
27 May 2023
15:00

Saracens (1)	35 – 25	(2) Sale Sharks
Try: Penalty try 22'; Malins 34' c Daly 67' m Van Zyl 71' c Con: Farrell (2/3) 35', 72'; Pen: Farrell (3/3) 5', 14', 50'	Report	Try: Van der Merwe 31' c Roebuck 44' m Rodd 52' c Con: Ford (2/3) 32', 53'; Pen: Ford (2/3) 7', 18'

Twickenham
Attendance: 61,875
Referee: Luke Pearce

Saracens
Sale Sharks

Team details

FB	15	(England) Alex Goode
RW	14	(England) Max Malins
OC	13	(England) Alex Lozowski		(substituted off) 63'
IC	12	(Wales) Nick Tompkins
LW	11	(Scotland) Sean Maitland		(substituted off) 21'
FH	10	(England) Owen Farrell (c)
SH	9	(South Africa) Ivan van Zyl		(substituted off) 74'
N8	8	(England) Jackson Wray			(substituted off) 76'
OF	7	(England) Ben Earl
BF	6	(England) Nick Isiekwe
RL	5	(England) Hugh Tizard		(substituted off) 62'
LL	4	(England) Maro Itoje
TP	3	(Italy) Marco Riccioni		(substituted off) 73'
HK	2	(England) Jamie George		(substituted off) 11'
LP	1	(Fiji) Eroni Mawi		(substituted off) 51'	(substituted on) 76'
Substitutions:
HK	16	(England) Theo Dan		(substituted on) 11'
PR	17	(Scotland) Robin Hislop	(yellow card) 74'	(substituted on) 51'
PR	18	(England) Christian Judge		(substituted on) 73'
LK	19	(Scotland) Callum Hunter-Hill		(substituted on) 62'
FL	20	(England) Toby Knight
SH	21	(Wales) Aled Davies		(substituted on) 74'
CE	22	(Scotland) Duncan Taylor		(substituted on) 63'
FB	23	(England) Elliot Daly		(substituted on) 21'
Coach:
(Ireland) Mark McCall

FB	15	(England) Joe Carpenter
RW	14	(England) Tom Roebuck		(substituted off) 51'
OC	13	(South Africa) Robert du Preez
IC	12	(England) Manu Tuilagi		(substituted off) 68'
LW	11	(England) Arron Reed
FH	10	(England) George Ford
SH	9	(England) Gus Warr		(substituted off) 51'
N8	8	(South Africa) Jono Ross (c)
OF	7	(England) Sam Dugdale		(substituted off) 73'
BF	6	(England) Tom Curry	(yellow card) 22'
RL	5	(England) Jonny Hill
LL	4	(South Africa) Jean-Luc du Preez		(substituted off) 73'
TP	3	(South Africa) Nick Schonert		(substituted off) 46'
HK	2	(South Africa) Akker van der Merwe		(substituted off) 46'
LP	1	(England) Simon McIntyre		(substituted off) 46'
Substitutions:
HK	16	(Scotland) Ewan Ashman		(substituted on) 46'
PR	17	(England) Bevan Rodd		(substituted on) 46'
PR	18	(South Africa) Coenie Oosthuizen		(substituted on) 46'
LK	19	(England) Josh Beaumont		(substituted on) 73'
FL	20	(England) Tom Ellis		(substituted on) 73'
SH	21	(England) Raffi Quirke		(substituted on) 51'
CE	22	(England) Sam James		(substituted on) 68'
WG	23	(England) Tom O'Flaherty		(substituted on) 51'
Coach:
(England) Alex Sanderson

Player of the Match:
(England) Owen Farrell (Saracens)
Assistant referees:
Karl Dickson
Christophe Ridley
Television Match Official:
Tom Foley

== Leading scorers ==
Note: Flags to the left of player names indicate national team as has been defined under World Rugby eligibility rules, or primary nationality for players who have not yet earned international senior caps. Players may hold one or more non-WR nationalities.

=== Most points ===
As of 27 May 2023

Rank	Player	Club	Points
1	(Ireland) Paddy Jackson	London Irish	205
2	(South Africa) Robert du Preez	Sale Sharks	174
3	(England) Owen Farrell	Saracens	153
4	(England) Brett Connon	Newcastle Falcons	125
5	(England) Fin Smith	Northampton Saints	115
6	(England) Joe Simmonds	Exeter Chiefs	102
7	(United States) AJ MacGinty	Bristol Bears	100
8	(South Africa) Handré Pollard	Leicester Tigers	96
9	(England) Marcus Smith	Harlequins	93
10	(England) Ben Spencer	Bath	87

=== Most tries ===
As of 27 May 2023

Rank	Player	Club	Tries
1	(England) Cadan Murley	Harlequins	15
2	(Argentina) Mateo Carreras	Newcastle Falcons	13
3	(England) Tommy Freeman	Northampton Saints	11
3	(England) Max Malins	Saracens	11
3	(England) Harry Thacker	Bristol Bears	11
6	(England) Tom Dunn	Bath	10
7	(England) Ollie Hassell-Collins	London Irish	9
7	(Argentina) Julián Montoya	Leicester Tigers	9
7	(Scotland) Sean Maitland	Saracens	9
7	(England) Tom Roebuck	Sale Sharks	9

Note: Points or tries scored in fixtures involving Wasps or Worcester Warriors are not included, after Premiership Rugby expunged these results from record, following the expulsion of both clubs from the league.

== Discipline ==
=== Citings/bans ===
Player	Match	Citing date	Law breached	Result	Ref
(Ireland) Niall Annett	Bristol vs. **Bath**	13 September 2022	9.27 – Acts Contrary to Good Sportsmanship (Red card)	2-match ban	
(South Africa) Nick Schonert	Bath vs. **Sale**	20 September 2022	9.13 – Dangerous Tackling (Red card)	3-match ban	
(England) Mako Vunipola	Newcastle vs. **Saracens**	11 October 2022	9.20(a) – Dangerous Charging in a Ruck or Maul (Red card)	3-match ban (Note: The suspension is reduced by one match, subject to the player's completion of the World Rugby Coaching Intervention Programme.)	
(England) Jacob Umaga	**Wasps** vs. Northampton	11 October 2022	9.17 – Tackling a Player in the Air (Red card)	3-match ban	
(England) Ben Stevenson	Northampton vs. **Newcastle**	18 October 2022	9.13 – Dangerous Tackling (Citing)	Citing dismissed	
(England) Dave Attwood	**Bath** vs. Northampton	25 October 2022	9.12 – Punch/Strike (Red card)	3-match ban	
(England) Ben Donnell	Harlequins vs. **London Irish**	1 November 2022	9.13 – Dangerous Tackling (Red card)	3-match ban	
(England) Nick David	**Harlequins** vs. London Irish	1 November 2022	9.13 – Dangerous Tackling (Red card)	3-match ban	
(South Africa) Francois van Wyk	Bristol vs. **Leicester**	6 December 2022	9.13 – Dangerous Tackling (Red card)	3-match ban	
(Australia) Adam Coleman	**London Irish** vs. Saracens	29 December 2022	9.13 – Dangerous Tackling (Red card)	4-match ban	
(Australia) Rob Simmons	**London Irish** (Various fixtures)	29 December 2022	9.27 – 3 Yellow Cards (Totting up)	1-match ban	
(England) Ben Earl	London Irish vs. **Saracens**	29 December 2022	9.13 – Dangerous Tackling (Red card)	Red card rescinded	
(England) Joe Marler	**Harlequins** vs. Bristol	30 December 2022	Conduct Prejudicial to the Interests of the Game or Union (Rule 5.12)	6-match ban (Note: The sanction is implemented as an immediate two-match ban, with the remaining four matches conditionally suspended until the end of the 2023–24 season.)	
(Fiji) Albert Tuisue	**Gloucester** (Various fixtures)	4 January 2023	9.27 – 3 Yellow Cards (Totting up)	2-match ban	
(England) Owen Farrell	Gloucester vs. **Saracens**	10 January 2023	9.13 – Dangerous Tackling (Citing)	4-match ban	
(South Africa) Stephan Lewies	London Irish vs. **Harlequins**	31 January 2023	9.20(b) – Dangerous Play in a Ruck or Maul (Red card)	2-match ban	
(England) Manu Tuilagi	Northampton vs. **Sale**	21 February 2023	9.11 – Reckless/Dangerous Play (Red card)	4-match ban	
(United States) Greg Peterson	Saracens vs. **Newcastle**	28 February 2023	9.13 – Dangerous Tackling (Red card)	3-match ban	
(Scotland) Robin Hislop	Sale vs. **Saracens**	8 March 2023	9.13 – Dangerous Tackling (Red card)	Red card rescinded	
(South Africa) Richard Palframan	**Newcastle** vs. Gloucester	28 March 2023	9.13 – Dangerous Tackling (Red card)	3-match ban	
(England) Olly Woodburn	Leicester vs. **Exeter**	18 April 2023	9.27 – 2 Yellow Cards (Red card)	Sending off sufficient	
(England) Ellis Genge	**Bristol** vs. Sale	18 April 2023	9.13 – Dangerous Tackling (Citing)	3-match ban	
(Scotland) Duncan Taylor	Northampton vs. **Saracens**	19 April 2023	9.13 – Dangerous Tackling (Red card)	3-match ban	
(England) Jack Nowell	**Exeter** (No fixture applicable)	19 April 2023	Conduct Prejudicial to the Interests of the Game or Union (Rule 5.12)	£10,000 fine (Note: The sanction is implemented as a £10,000 financial penalty, but £2,500 of that fine is conditionally suspended until the end of the 2023–24 season.)	
(Wales) Dafydd Jenkins	**Exeter** vs. Bristol	25 April 2023	9.13 – Dangerous Tackling (Red card)	3-match ban	
(England) Chris Ashton	**Leicester** vs. Harlequins	11 May 2023	9.13 – Dangerous Tackling (Red card)	Red card rescinded	

Note: The cited player's club is listed in bold italics.

== Awards ==
=== Monthly awards ===
==== Player of the Month ====
The following received Player of the Month awards during the 2022–23 season, as selected by a panel of media commentators, in addition to monthly public polls.

Month	Nationality	Player	Position	Club	Ref
September	Samoa	Theo McFarland	Flanker	Saracens	
October	England	Alex Goode	Full-Back	Saracens	
November	England	Ollie Lawrence	Centre	Bath	
December	South Africa	Robert du Preez	Fly-Half	Sale	
January	South Africa	Benhard Janse van Rensburg	Centre	London Irish	
February	England	Fraser Dingwall	Centre	Northampton	
March	England	Tom Pearson	Flanker	London Irish	

==== Try of the Month ====
The following were chosen as Try of the Month, after receiving the most votes from the public. The winner for October was also recognised as the Try of the Season.

Month	Nationality	Player	Position	Club	Ref
September	Argentina	Mateo Carreras	Wing	Newcastle	
October	Argentina	Mateo Carreras (2)	Wing	Newcastle	
November	England	Jake Morris	Wing	Gloucester	
December	England	Chandler Cunningham-South	Flanker	London Irish	
January	England	Ollie Thorley	Wing	Gloucester	
February	England	Fraser Dingwall	Centre	Northampton	
March	England	Harry Randall	Scrum-Half	Bristol	

=== End-of-season awards ===
The nominees for the 2023 Premiership Rugby Awards were announced on 5 May 2023. The winners were then revealed on 10 May 2023.

Player of the Season
Nationality	Nominee	Club	Winner	Ref
South Africa	Robert du Preez	Sale	(England); Ollie Lawrence	
England	Owen Farrell	Saracens	(England); Ollie Lawrence	
England	Ollie Lawrence	Bath	(England); Ollie Lawrence	
South Africa	Jasper Wiese	Leicester	(England); Ollie Lawrence	

Breakthrough Player of the Season
Nationality	Nominee	Club	Winner	Ref
England	Seb Atkinson	Gloucester	(England); Tom Pearson	
England	Tom Pearson	London Irish	(England); Tom Pearson	
England	Fin Smith	Northampton	(England); Tom Pearson	
England	Gus Warr	Sale	(England); Tom Pearson	

Director of Rugby of the Season
Nationality	Nominee	Club	Winner	Ref
England	Phil Dowson	Northampton	(Ireland); Mark McCall	
Ireland	Mark McCall	Saracens	(Ireland); Mark McCall	
England	Alex Sanderson	Sale	(Ireland); Mark McCall	
England	Richard Wigglesworth	Leicester	(Ireland); Mark McCall	

Community Player of the Season
Nationality	Nominee	Club	Winner	Ref
Ireland	Joe Joyce	Bristol	(Scotland); Sean Maitland	
Scotland	Sean Maitland	Saracens	(Scotland); Sean Maitland	
England	Will Muir	Bath	(Scotland); Sean Maitland	
Ireland	Hugh O'Sullivan	London Irish	(Scotland); Sean Maitland	

==== Team of the Season ====
Forwards
No.	Nationality	Player	Position	Club
1	England	Val Rapava-Ruskin	Prop	Gloucester
2	Argentina	Julián Montoya	Hooker	Leicester
3	Italy	Marco Riccioni	Prop	Saracens
4	England	George Martin	Lock	Leicester
5	England	David Ribbans	Lock	Northampton
6	England	Ben Earl	Flanker	Saracens
7	England	Tom Pearson	Flanker	London Irish
8	South Africa	Jasper Wiese	Number 8	Leicester

Backs
No.	Nationality	Player	Position	Club
9	England	Alex Mitchell	Scrum-Half	Northampton
10	South Africa	Robert du Preez	Fly-Half	Sale
11	Argentina	Mateo Carreras	Wing	Newcastle
12	England	Fraser Dingwall	Centre	Northampton
13	England	Ollie Lawrence	Centre	Bath
14	England	Cadan Murley	Wing	Harlequins
15	England	Joe Carpenter	Full-Back	Sale

==== Hall of Fame ====
Class of 2023
Nationality	Inductee	Position	Club(s)	Ref
England	Matt Banahan	Wing	Bath, Gloucester	
England	Brad Barritt	Centre	Saracens	
England	Tom Youngs	Hooker	Leicester	

== See also ==
- 2022–23 European Rugby Champions Cup
- 2022–23 Premiership Rugby Cup
- 2022–23 RFU Championship
- 2022–23 United Rugby Championship
- 2022–23 Top 14 season
- 2022–23 Rugby Pro D2 season
- 2023 Major League Rugby season
- 2023 Super Rugby Pacific season
