= Bevan Rodd =

England international rugby union player

- Born: 26 August 2000 (age 26) Dunoon, Scotland
- Height: 1.83 m (6 ft 0 in)
- Weight: 118 kg (260 lb; 18 st 8 lb)
- School: The Buchan School; Sedbergh School

Rugby union career
- Position: Prop
- Current team: Sale Sharks
Senior career
| Years | Team | Apps | (Points) |
| 2019– | Sale Sharks | 106 | (60) |
- Correct as of 7 June 2025
International career
| Years | Team | Apps | (Points) |
| 2017–2018 | England U18 | 7 | (0) |
| 2021– | England | 10 | (5) |
- Correct as of 19 July 2025

Bevan Rodd (born 26 August 2000) is a professional rugby union player who plays as a prop for Premiership Rugby club Sale Sharks. Born in Scotland he represents England at international level after qualifying on ancestry grounds.

== Club career ==
Born in Scotland, Rodd grew up on the Isle of Man and was educated at The Buchan School. He later attended Sedbergh School and subsequently came through the Sale Sharks academy, making his professional debut against Northampton Saints in a Premiership Rugby Cup match under Steve Diamond in 2019. Rodd really made his professional breakthrough the following season under the management of Paul Deacon and Alex Sanderson.

Having become a regular starter for Sale at the age of twenty, on 4 April 2021 Rodd was a starter against Scarlets in Sale's 57–14 away Champions Cup victory. He still figured in the starting XV a week later, for the quarter-final defeat against La Rochelle.

Rodd scored a try during the 2022–23 Premiership Rugby final which Sale lost against Saracens to finish league runners up.

== International career ==
Rodd represented the England Under-16 and England under-18 team. He was also a member of the squad that lost to Ireland in the opening round of the 2019 Six Nations Under 20s Championship. Eligible for both Scotland and England national teams, in April 2021 he was reportedly reviewed by former England manager Eddie Jones and coach Matt Proudfoot for future selection. In June 2021 Rodd was included in the England senior squad for the 2021 Summer Internationals, but did not feature in either of the tests.

On 10 November 2021 Rodd was called up to the England squad during the 2021 Autumn Nations Series for England's match against Australia. He replaced Joe Marler, who had tested positive for COVID-19 and was forced to pull out of the match. Rodd was initially named on the bench against Australia, before being moved to the starting line up after starting loosehead Ellis Genge also had to withdraw due to COVID-19. On 13 November 2021 Rodd earned his first England cap in the 32–15 victory over the Wallabies.

A week after making his international debut Rodd started in their next match against South Africa, with Genge still unavailable for selection and Marler only coming out of isolation a few days before. Rodd finished his 2021 Autumn Nations Series with a 27–26 win over the world champions. Rodd was included in the initial 36-man England training squad for the 2022 Six Nations Championship but did not feature in the tournament. Later that year Rodd was recalled to the England squad for their 2022 summer tour of Australia and 2022 Autumn Internationals but did not add to his two caps.

Rodd made his next international appearance as a replacement in a warm-up defeat against Wales at the Millennium Stadium. He was subsequently named in England's squad for the 2023 Rugby World Cup. Rodd scored his first international try during their pool stage victory over Chile. He was not selected for either the quarter-final against Fiji or semi-final elimination against champions South Africa. Rodd played in their last fixture of the tournament as England defeated Argentina to finish third with the Bronze medal.

=== List of international tries ===
As of 23 September 2023

| No. | Date | Venue | Opponent | Score | Result | Competition | Ref. |
|---|---|---|---|---|---|---|---|
| 1 | 23 September 2023 | Stade Pierre-Mauroy, Lille, France | Chile | 22–0 | 71–0 | 2023 Rugby World Cup | |

== Honours ==
Sale Sharks

- Premiership Rugby runner-up: 2022–23

England

- Rugby World Cup
  - (bronze) Third place: 2023
