= Joe Carpenter (rugby union) =

English rugby union player

- Born: Joseph Carpenter; 19 August 2001 (age 25) Leeds, England
- Height: 1.80 m (5 ft 11 in)
- School: Lawnswood School; Woodhouse Grove School

Rugby union career
- Position: Full-back
- Current team: Sale Sharks
Youth career
- 2008–2016: West Park Leeds RUFC
- 2016–2020: Leeds Tykes
Senior career
Years	Team	Apps	(Points)
2020–	Sale Sharks	73	(95)
2021	→ Nottingham (loan)	1	(0)
2021–2022	→ Sale FC (loan)	11	(30)
- Correct as of 28 October 2025
International career
Years	Team	Apps	(Points)
2017	England U16	1	(0)
2019	England U18	1	(0)
2024–	England A	1	(0)
2025–	England	1	(0)
- Correct as of 17 November 2024

Joseph Carpenter (born 19 August 2001) is an English professional rugby union player who plays as a full-back for Premiership Rugby club Sale Sharks.

== Early life ==
Carpenter was born in Leeds. He attended Lawnswood School before then moving to Woodhouse Grove School. He began playing rugby at the age of five, playing for West Park Leeds RUFC. Carpenter joined the Leeds Carnegie academy at the age of 15.

== Club career ==
Carpenter signed for Sale Sharks in August 2019. He made his debut for the club off the bench in the European Rugby Champions Cup in January 2020, in a 30–23 loss to La Rochelle. He then made his first start on 18 January in the same competition against Glasgow Warriors.

In March 2021 Carpenter joined Nottingham on dual registration. He started in Nottingham's opening fixture against Ealing Trailfinders. He also featured for Sale in this time period, starting against Wasps in the Premiership Rugby Cup and scoring his first try for the club, on 29 March, in a win against Harlequins - also in the cup. In October 2021 Carpenter was dual registered with Sale FC, making his debut against Taunton Titans.

Carpenter made his Premiership Rugby debut on 1 October 2022, playing at the Salford Community Stadium against Exeter Chiefs. He scored his first Premiership try in the fixture, which Sale won 28–20. Carpenter was voted the Rugby Player's Association 15 under 23 MVP of the month for October 2022, after scoring three tries in five appearances. At the end of that season he started in the 2022–23 Premiership Rugby final which Sale lost against Saracens to finish league runners up.

== International career ==
In April 2017 Carpenter was selected for England U16, playing in a 41–22 win over Wales. He was then named in an England U17 training squad in February 2018, although he did not ultimately feature for the side.

In April 2019 Carpenter was named as part of England's squad for the U18 Six Nations festival, starting against Wales. He was then named as part of the England U20 elite player squad for 2021, although he did not feature for the side.

In June 2024 Carpenter was called up to the senior England squad for their tour of New Zealand although did not make an appearance. Later that year in November 2024 he started for England A in a victory over Australia A.

Carpenter was called up for England's training squad ahead of their game against France XV as part of their preparations for the 2025 mid-year rugby union internationals. He started at full-back for England XV in their non-capped international and was named man of the match. He was then named as part of England's squad for their tour of Argentina and the United States.

On 19 July 2025, Carpenter made his senior England debut, winning 40-5 against USA at Audi Field in Washington D.C.
