= Matt Rogerson =

English rugby union player

- Born: Matthew Philip Rogerson; 29 June 1993 (age 33) Lancaster, England
- Height: 1.93 m (6 ft 4 in)
- Weight: 112 kg (17 st 9 lb)
- School: Ripley St Thomas Church of England Academy
- University: Loughborough University

Rugby union career
- Position: Back Row
Amateur team(s)
| Years | Team | Apps | (Points) |
| – | Vale of Lune RUFC | | |
| – | Loughborough Students | | |
Senior career
| Years | Team | Apps | (Points) |
| 2015–2017 | Sale Sharks | 2 | (0) |
| 2017–2018 | Jersey Reds | 23 | (10) |
| 2018–2023 | London Irish | 100 | (65) |
| 2023–2025 | Leicester Tigers | 28 | (25) |
| 2025– | Worcester Warriors | 1 | (0) |
- Correct as of 15 June 2025

Matt Rogerson (born 29 June 1993) is an English professional rugby union player. He previously captained London Irish until their administration in 2023, then played for two season's at Leicester Tigers in Premiership Rugby.

== Professional career ==
Matt Rogerson signed his first professional contract with Sale Sharks in 2015. He then moved to the Jersey Reds for the 2017/2018 season in the RFU Championship.

After a successful year at the Reds he moved to London Irish for the 2018/2019 season. In November 20, 2019, Rogerson made his premiership debut against Wasps RFC.

Rogerson made his 50th appearance in the opening game of the 2020/21 season against Worcester Warriors as captain.

Rogerson was made London Irish club captain for the 2021/22 season, going on to lead the side in their first appearance in the Heineken Champions Cup for a decade after an eighth-placed finish in the league. That year, he made 193 successful tackles (23rd overall in the Premiership) and 380 attacking ruck arrivals (seventh overall in the Premiership). Rogerson was also in the top five of ball carries (152) with the third-most carry metres into contact at the Club (681), with his 19 tackle breaks only bettered in the back-row by new signing Tom Pearson (26). His 380 attacking ruck arrivals that term was only beaten by Rob Simmons (383) at London Irish.

Rogerson has retained his role as club captain for the 2022/23 season for London Irish with Adam Coleman, Rob Simmons and Paddy Jackson as part of the leadership group.

Rogerson collected his 100th cap for London Irish Vs Newcastle on Saturday 3 December 2022 with the game finishing 39-17 to Irish.

On 4 July 2023 Rogerson moved to Leicester Tigers following London Irish's entry into administration.

On 20 June 2025, Rogerson would sign for revamped Worcester Warriors back in the RFU Championship from the 2025-26 season.
