= Josh Hallett =

English rugby union player (born 2000)

- Born: Joshua Hallett; 6 September 2000 (age 26) Southend-on-Sea, England
- Height: 1.79 m (5 ft 10 in)
- Weight: 85 kg (13 st 5 lb)
- School: New Hall School

Rugby union career
- Position: Centre
- Current team: Saracens
Amateur team(s)
Years	Team	Apps	(Points)
–	Southend Saxons		
Senior career
Years	Team	Apps	(Points)
2019–2025	Saracens	23	(10)
2019–2020	→Old Albanian	11	(30)
2020–2025	→Ampthill	23	(35)
- Correct as of 16 May 2025
International career
Years	Team	Apps	(Points)
2018	England U18	3	(0)
- Correct as of 24 September 2022

Joshua Hallett is an English professional rugby union player, who currently plays as a centre for Premiership Rugby side Saracens.

== Early life ==
Hallett was born in Southend-on-Sea and grew up in Leigh. He began playing youth rugby for Southend, and continued his education in the sport at New Hall School, under the tutelage of Tom Taylor, before joining Saracens in 2016.

== Club career ==
Hallett was recruited into the Saracens junior academy aged 16 and played in the Under-18s Academy League during his first year. Injury ruled him for much of the 2017–18 season, but following his recovery, he featured for the Saracens 7s side in various tournaments, which included success in the Premiership Rugby Sevens Series. Hallett graduated into the senior academy in 2019 and made his Premiership debut a year later, at the age of 20, as a substitute in a 40–17 victory over Exeter Chiefs. In the subsequent two seasons, he was dual-registered with both Saracens and Ampthill, making appearances for both in the Premiership, RFU Championship and Premiership Rugby Cup.

Prior to the 2022–23 season, Hallett was promoted into the Saracens first-team squad. In his first competitive appearance as a full-time senior player in September 2022, he scored his first try, after coming off the bench during a 41–39 win against Gloucester.

== International career ==
Hallett represented England at numerous age-group levels as a teenager, including U16s and U17s. Among his notable appearances was being called up to the England U18s squad for their tour of South Africa in 2018.
