= James Stokes (rugby union) =

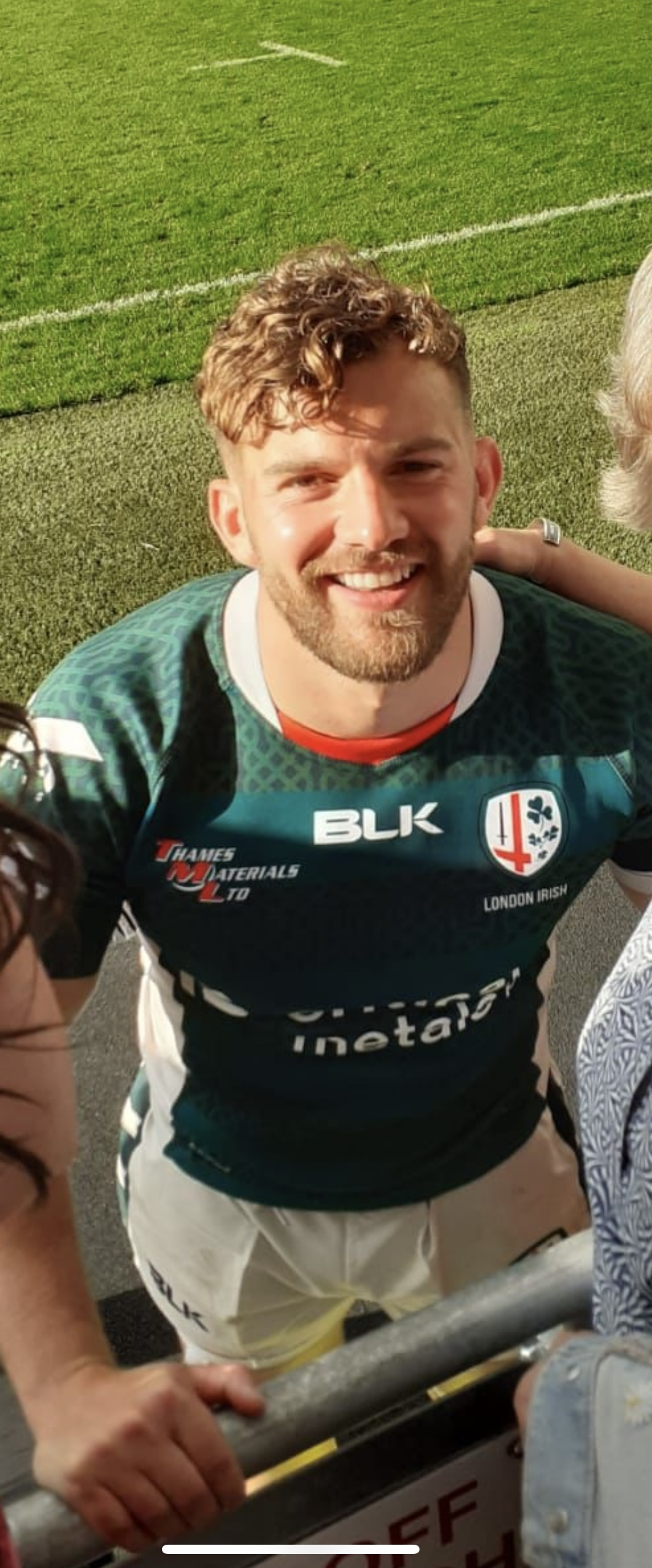
- Born: James Alexander Stokes; 19 November 1991 (age 34) Mansfield, England
- Height: 1.83 m (6 ft 0 in)
- Weight: 95 kg (14 st 13 lb)
- School: Nottingham High School
- University: Nottingham Trent University University of Law

Rugby union career
- Position: Fullback
- Current team: Rugby Football Club Los Angeles
Amateur team(s)
Years	Team	Apps	(Points)
–	Nottingham High School		
Senior career
Years	Team	Apps	(Points)
–	Nottingham		
2013-2019	Cambridge		
2019-2023	London Irish		
2023-	Rugby Football Club Los Angeles		

James Alexander Stokes (born 19 November 1991) is an English professional rugby union player who plays as a fullback for Major League Rugby club Rugby Football Club Los Angeles.

== Early life ==
Stokes was born in Mansfield, East Midlands. He began playing rugby at the age of 14, representing Nottingham High School, where he played alongside future professional rugby players Alex Lewington and Max Trimble.

== Club career ==
Stokes began his career at Nottingham Rugby Club. He made appearances in the British and Irish Cup. He scored a match-winning drop goal from 40 meters out against Pontypridd RFC.

In 2013, Stokes joined Cambridge Rugby Club, and played a role in their promotion to National League One in 2016. He then moved to Coventry RFC. At Coventry, he helped the team secure promotion to the RFU Championship in the 2017–18 season. He finished as the league's top try-scorer with 21 tries, a club record. He also tied the club record for most tries in a single game, scoring four against Yorkshire Carnegie in the 2019–20 season. He made over 80 appearances for Coventry, scoring 35 tries.

In December 2019, Stokes signed with London Irish on a short-term contract. He debuted against Bath Rugby in the Gallagher Premiership. He played fullback, wing, and centre.

In June 2021, Stokes signed a new contract with London Irish. Stokes made 61 appearances for London Irish, scoring 12 tries in the Gallagher Premiership, Premiership Rugby Cup, and ECPR Challenge Cup. His try against Sale Sharks in May 2023 won the club's 'Try Of The Year' award.

After London Irish's financial difficulties in June 2023, Stokes joined Major League Rugby team Rugby Football Club Los Angeles. He made 11 appearances in the 2024 season, scoring a try against San Diego Legion.
