= George Head (rugby union) =

English rugby union player

- Full name: George William Head
- Born: 4 August 1999 (age 27) Redhill, Surrey, England
- Height: 185 cm (6 ft 1 in)
- Weight: 118 kg (260 lb; 18 st 8 lb)
- School: Tonbridge School

Rugby union career
- Position: Hooker
- Current team: Harlequins
Youth career
- 20??-2017: Old Reigatian RFC
Senior career
Years	Team	Apps	(Points)
2017-	Harlequins	23	(20)
2017-2018	→ Worthing RFC (loan)	14	(15)
2018-2019	→ Esher RFC (loan)	4	(0)
2018-2019	→ Barnes RFC (loan)	11	(20)
2021-	→ London Scottish (loan)	8	(0)
- Correct as of 10 December 2023
International career
Years	Team	Apps	(Points)
2015	England under-16	-	(-)
2017	England under-18	-	(-)
- Correct as of 10 December 2023
Coaching career
- Years: Team
- 2021-: Old Reigatian RFC (Forwards Coach)
- Correct as of 10 December 2023

George Head (born 4 August 1999) is a professional rugby union player who currently plays for Harlequins in the Premiership, as well as featuring on loan for RFU Championship side London Scottish.

== Career ==
Head began his career at Old Reigatian RFC before being picked up by the Harlequins Academy in 2017. Winning the Under-18 Premiership with the London-based club. Originally a loosehead prop he was persuaded by then Harlequins DoR Paul Gustard to transition to hooker.

Before making his senior debut for Harlequins he spent time on loan at numerous clubs; Worthing RFC, Esher RFC and Barnes RFC. Barnes at the time coached by then Harlequins hooker Joe Gray, George Head working with him closely.

He was set to make his debut for Harlequins against Bath in the Champions Cup, having been named on the bench, however did not feature with Samoan hooker Elia Elia playing the full match. He was later named on the bench for a Premiership clash against Wasps, Head coming off the bench in the 59th minute. The week after he earned his first start against Leicester Tigers.

In 2021 him and Caden Murley began coaching at Old Reigatians, Head being assigned as the forwards coach.
