= Brett Connon =

- Born: Brett Clark Connon; 29 August 1996 (age 30) Carlisle, England
- Height: 1.76 m (5 ft 9 in)
- Weight: 93 kg (14 st 9 lb; 205 lb)
- School: Austin Friars

Rugby union career
- Position: Fly-half
Amateur team(s)
Years	Team	Apps	(Points)
2014–2015	Tynedale	24	(107)
2015–2017	Blaydon	35	(207)
2017–2018	Darlington Mowden Park	15	(70)
Senior career
Years	Team	Apps	(Points)
2016–	Newcastle Red Bulls	160	(740)
2016–2017	→ Rotherham Titans	5	(5)
- Correct as of 23 Sep 2026
International career
Years	Team	Apps	(Points)
2016	Ireland U20	5	(25)

Brett Clark Connon (born 29 August 1996) is a rugby union player for Newcastle Red Bulls in Premiership Rugby. His primary position is fly-half; he has also featured at fullback.. In January 2026 Newcastle announced that Connon had signed a new contract with the club, taking him to the end of the 2027/28 season.

Born in Carlisle, England, he qualifies for Ireland through his father and has represented Ireland under 20s.

== Career ==
Connon started playing rugby around 6 years old for his local club Carlisle and also played for his school Austin Friars. He joined Newcastle Falcons academy at 15 and was identified by the IRFU's exiles programme and played for Ireland's under 18 team. He made his debut for Newcastle's first team on 14 October 2016 against the Ospreys in a European Rugby Challenge Cup match. On 10 March 2019, with the final kick of the match, Connon scored the winning penalty for Newcastle against Wasps.

In November 2024, he kicked seven points against Saracens, helping Newcastle achieve their first win over the north London club since 2009.
