= Nick David =

English rugby union player (born 1998)

- Born: Nicholas Carl David; 4 November 1998 (age 28) Redditch, England
- Height: 1.83 m (6 ft 0 in)
- Weight: 90 kg (14 st 2 lb)
- School: Warwick School

Rugby union career
- Position: Wing / Fullback
- Current team: Harlequins
Senior career
Years	Team	Apps	(Points)
2018–2021	Worcester Warriors	43	(45)
2019–2020	→ Hartpury University	4	(0)
2021-	Harlequins	66	(75)
- Correct as of 19 January 2025
International career
Years	Team	Apps	(Points)
2013–2014	England U16s		
2016–2017	England U18s		
2017–2018	England U19s		
- Correct as of 13 November 2020

Nick David (born 4 November 1998) is an English rugby union player who competes for Harlequins in the Premiership Rugby.

David became a part of Worcester Warriors academy for the 2017–18 season. David made his senior debut in the Premiership Rugby Cup match against Saracens at Allianz Park in November 2018.

He again impressed against Saracens in the Premiership Rugby Cup semi-final at Sixways Stadium in February 2019 but his season was ended by a shoulder injury which he sustained scoring his first try in that match. David returned to action in the 2019 Premiership Rugby Sevens Series at Northampton in September 2019, and came off the bench in the Premiership Rugby Cup match against Exeter Chiefs at Sixways later in the year. He celebrated his Premiership debut by scoring a try in the 22–21 defeat by Bath at Sixways in February 2020 and scored another try against Bristol Bears the following week, 13–10 in a losing effort.

On 17 June 2020, David signed his first professional contract to stay at Worcester at Sixways from the 2020–21 season.

David is a NatWest Cup winner at Under 15 and 18 levels with Warwick School and has featured for England from Under 16 to 19 levels.

On 19 April 2021, David would leave Worcester to sign for Premiership rivals Harlequins from the 2021-22 season.
