= Simon McIntyre =

English rugby union player

- Born: Simon Felix McIntyre; 19 March 1991 (age 35) Manchester, England
- Height: 1.83 m (6 ft 0 in)
- Weight: 118 kg (18 st 8 lb)

Rugby union career
- Position: Loosehead Prop
- Current team: Sale Sharks
Senior career
Years	Team	Apps	(Points)
2010-2011	Sale Sharks	5	(5)
2011–2021	Wasps	184	(25)
2021–	Sale Sharks	200+	(5)
- Correct as of 28 November 2025

Simon McIntyre is an English rugby union prop forward for Sale Sharks.

== Career ==
Born in Manchester and educated at St Bede's College, Manchester, he joined his local club, Broughton Park RUFC, at the age of eight, and represented England at U18 level.

McIntyre started his professional career at Sale Sharks in 2009 as an academy player, appearing in five matches in the Aviva Premiership, Amlin Challenge Cup and LV=Cup.

He signed for Wasps in 2011, making ten Premiership appearances in his first season. He played in the Wasps sides that reached the semi-finals of the 2015-16 European Rugby Champions Cup and finished Premiership runners-up in 2016-17 and 2019-20.

On 28 July 2021 Sale Sharks announced that he had rejoined them. During his decade at Wasps, McIntyre had played in 184 matches and was an enduringly popular player with the fans. On his departure the Coventry Telegraph described him as 'a club legend'.

In 2023 McIntyre played for Sale in the Premiership title final against Saracens, which Sale lost 35-25, leaving them in the runners-up slot.

In his early career he was primarily a tight-head prop, and while he retains the ability to anchor the scrum from No.3, his career really took off when he made the switch to loose-head. In addition to his set-piece skills, he is admired for his mobility in the loose as well as his turn of pace and footwork.

In 2021 McIntyre became a co-founder of the Rugby Black List, an organisation 'celebrating and connecting the black community within Rugby Union'. Since 2023 he has been a board member of the Rugby Players' Association. He has an MBA in Business Administration and Management from Warwick University (2020-2022).
