= Alexander Moon =

English rugby union player (born 1996)

- Born: Alexander James Moon; 6 September 1996 (age 30) Ipswich, Suffolk, England
- Height: 2.01 m (6 ft 7 in)
- Weight: 123 kg (19 st 5 lb; 271 lb)
- School: St Joseph’s College; Sedbergh School

Rugby union career
- Position: Lock
- Current team: Bayonne
Senior career
Years	Team	Apps	(Points)
2016–2024	Northampton Saints	59	(5)
2024–	Bayonne	28	(0)
- Correct as of 12 December 2025
International career
Years	Team	Apps	(Points)
2016	England U20	2	(0)

Alexander Moon (born 6 September 1996) is an English professional rugby union player who plays as a lock for Top 14 side Bayonne, having departed Northampton Saints after their Premiership-winning 2023-24 season.

== Background ==
Moon began playing rugby during his time at St Joseph's College, Ipswich where he studied from age five to fifteen. He earned a three-year scholarship to Sedbergh School to complete his A Levels and further his rugby development.

Moon comes from a strong rugby family with his father, Jon, coaching Ipswich rugby club and aunt, Vickie, a former physiotherapist for Leeds Rhinos and Yorkshire Carnegie. His uncle played for the rugby league side, Bradford Bulls.

== Club career ==
In 2015 Northampton Saints confirmed that Moon would join their senior academy and he was subsequently awarded a senior academy contract at the start of the 2015/16 season. In November 2016 he made his senior club debut against Newcastle Falcons in the Anglo-Welsh Cup. Moon was also a member of the Northampton Wanderers side that beat Gloucester United 36–15 to win the 2017 Premiership A League and Exeter Braves the following season to retain the title.

In February 2019 Moon signed his first professional senior contract with the Saints and later that season started for the Northampton side that defeated Saracens in the final of the Premiership Rugby Cup.

On 30 January 2024, Moon would leave Northampton to join French side Bayonne in the Top 14 from the 2024–25 season.

In December 2025, he signed for Bordeaux Bègles ahead of the 2026–27 season.

== International career ==
Moon represented the England under-20 team in the 2016 Six Nations Under 20s Championship. In January 2020 Moon received his first call-up to the senior England squad for the 2020 Six Nations Championship.
