= Harvey Skinner =

English rugby union player (born 1997)

- Born: Harvey Cameron Skinner; 31 December 1997 (age 28) Taunton, England
- Height: 1.89 m (6 ft 2 in)
- Weight: 92 kg (14 st 7 lb)

Rugby union career
- Position: Fly-half
- Current team: Exeter Chiefs
Senior career
Years	Team	Apps	(Points)
2015–	Exeter Chiefs	100	
- Correct as of 25 March 2025
- Correct as of 25 March 2021

Harvey Skinner (born 31 December 1997) is an English rugby union player who plays for Exeter Chiefs in the Premiership Rugby. His playing position is fly-half.
