= Sam Graham (rugby union) =

English rugby union player

- Born: 6 July 1997 (age 29)
- Height: 1.91 m (6 ft 3 in)
- Weight: 112 kg (247 lb; 17 st 9 lb)

Rugby union career
- Position(s): Flanker, Number 8
- Current team: Northampton Saints
Youth career
- Bath
Amateur team(s)
Years	Team	Apps	(Points)
- Chippenham RFC
Senior career
Years	Team	Apps	(Points)
2018–2020	Bristol Bears	4	(10)
2018	→ Massey (loan)	10	(0)
2018–2019	→ Hartpury University (loan)	0	(0)
2020–2022	Doncaster Knights	31	(0)
2022–2026	Northampton Saints	68	(40)
2026–	Newcastle Red Bulls	0	(0)
- Correct as of 3 January 2026

Sam Graham (born 6 July 1997) is an English rugby union player who plays as a back row forward for Newcastle Red Bulls.

== Career ==
Graham started his rugby career playing for Chippenham RFC and played as a youngster in the Bath Rugby academy. He went on to play for Massey Rugby Club in Auckland, for whom he made ten appearances. He signed a two year academy contract with Bristol Bears in 2018. He played for Hartpury on loan in 2019.

He signed for Doncaster Knights in the Rugby Championship in 2020, and won the players’ and coaches’ player of the year awards during his first year. The following year, he captained the side to a second-place finish in the Championship in 2021-22, and was named in the Championship's team of the year as they won 17 out of 20 matches.

He signed for Northampton Saints in the summer of 2022. He scored four tries in twenty appearances in his first season with the club. In December 2023, having made 31 appearances for the club and captaining the side on two occasions, he signed a new contract with Northampton.

On 12 January 2026, Graham would leave Northampton to join Premiership rivals Newcastle Red Bulls on a two-year contract from the 2026-27 season.

== Honours ==
Northampton

- Premiership Rugby: 2023–24, 2025–26
- European Rugby Champions Cup runner-up: 2024–25

== Personal life ==
Graham worked as a chef prior to becoming a professional rugby union player.
