= Sam Dugdale =

English rugby union player (born 1999)

- Born: Samuel Nathan F. Dugdale; 30 September 1999 (age 27) Lancaster, England
- Height: 1.85 m (6 ft 1 in)
- Weight: 104 kg (229 lb; 16 st 5 lb)

Rugby union career
- Position: Flanker
- Current team: Sale Sharks
Senior career
Years	Team	Apps	(Points)
2018–	Sale Sharks	50	(35)
- Correct as of 20 May 2023

Sam Dugdale (born 30 September 1999) is an English rugby union player who plays for Sale Sharks in the Premiership Rugby.
