= Ben Donnell (rugby union) =

- Born: Benjamin McClelland Donnell; 2 August 2000 (age 26) Winchester, England
- Height: 1.98 m (6 ft 6 in)
- Weight: 118 kg (18 st 8 lb)

Rugby union career
- Position(s): Lock, Flanker
- Current team: Ulster
Senior career
Years	Team	Apps	(Points)
2017–2023	London Irish	54	(30)
2023–2024	Gloucester	12	(0)
2024–2026	Cardiff	26	(20)
2026–	Ulster	5	(0)
- Correct as of 31 October 2026
International career
Years	Team	Apps	(Points)
2020	England U20	2	(0)
- Correct as of 7 February 2020

Ben Donnell (born 2 August 2000) is an English professional rugby union player who plays as a lock or flanker for United Rugby Championship club Ulster.

== Career ==
Born in Winchester, Donnell came through the academy at London Irish, and represented England at under-18 and under-20 levels. He made his first senior appearance for London Irish at the age of 18 in the 2017–18 Anglo-Welsh Cup. Donnell made two appearances for the England U20 side during the 2020 Six Nations Under 20s Championship.

He joined Gloucester in 2023. A season later he joined Cardiff. Donnell is Irish-qualified through his Belfast-born father, and at the end of the 2025-26 season he signed for Ulster.
