= Lennox Anyanwu =

English rugby union player

- Born: Lennox Udochukwu Anyanwu; 29 November 2000 (age 25) London, England
- Height: 1.82 m (6 ft 0 in)
- Weight: 102 kg (16 st 1 lb; 225 lb)
- School: Christ's Hospital

Rugby union career
- Position: Centre
- Current team: Montpellier
Senior career
Years	Team	Apps	(Points)
2020–2025	Harlequins	24	(20)
2019–2020	→ London Scottish (loan)	10	(15)
2022–2023	→ Richmond (loan)	12	(10)
2025–	Montpellier	3	(0)
- Correct as of 1 August 2024
International career
Years	Team	Apps	(Points)
- England U16
- England U17
2018	England U18	3	(0)

Lennox Anyanwu (born 29 November 2000) is an English professional rugby union player who plays as a centre for Montpellier Hérault Rugby.

== Early life ==
Anyanwu attended Christ's Hospital School in Horsham, West Sussex where he was the first recipient of the Joe Launchbury Rugby Scholarship. He was a member of the Harlequins’ Elite Player Development before joining the Harlequins academy ahead of the 2019-2020 season.

== Club career ==
During the 2019-2020 Anyanwu played on loan for London Scottish. He made his senior debut for Harlequins in December 2020, coming off the bench in a home win over Bristol Bears. He also played on loan for Championship side Richmond on loan during the 2022-23 season. He signed a contract extension with Harlequins in January 2023 after making after scoring four tries in thirteen appearances for the club.

On 2 July 2025, Anyanwu would leave Harlequins to sign for French giants Montpellier in the Top 14 competition ahead of the 2025-26 season.

== International career ==
Anyanwu has played for England at U16, U17 and U18 level. In January 2024, he was name checked by England senior head coach Steve Borthwick as a potential future international.

== Personal life ==
Anyanwu resided in North London with his mother and brother even after signing with Harlequins and would commute to their training base in Guildford, Surrey.
