= Raffi Quirke =

English rugby union player

- Born: Raphael Quirke; 18 August 2001 (age 25) Chorlton, England
- Height: 1.78 m (5 ft 10 in)
- Weight: 85 kg (13 st 5 lb)
- School: St Ambrose College

Rugby union career
- Position: Scrum-half
- Current team: Newcastle Red Bulls
Senior career
Years	Team	Apps	(Points)
2018–2026	Sale Sharks	87	(65)
2026–	Newcastle Red Bulls	0	(0)
- Correct as of 7 June 2026
International career
Years	Team	Apps	(Points)
2018–2019	England U18	8	(15)
2021–	England	2	(5)
- Correct as of 30 March 2026

Raffi Quirke (born 18 August 2001) is an English professional rugby union player who plays as a scrum-half for PREM Rugby club Newcastle Red Bulls.

== Early life ==
Quirke started playing rugby when he was 5, inspired by his father Saul who coached him through his early years. He was part of a Broughton Park RFC side at U9s level, in which the side went unbeaten while scoring 267 tries. Quirke was also a triathlete, following in the footsteps of both of his parents, becoming North-West champion at triathlon when 12 or 13. However, it became increasingly difficult to consider pursuing both rugby and triathlons to a professional level, so he eventually decided to focus on rugby.

Quirke was educated at Saint Ambrose College. He of Irish ancestry through a maternal grandparent.

== Club career ==
In 2019 Quirke spent a period on loan to Sale FC in National League One. On 20 February 2021 Quirke made his professional club debut for Sale Sharks in a Premiership game against Harlequins. Later that season in April he scored his first try for the club in a European Rugby Champions Cup game away to Scarlets. Quirke played in the 2023 Premiership final which Sale lost against Saracens to finish league runners-up.

In January 2026, Quirke signed for Newcastle Red Bulls ahead of the following season.

== International career ==
Quirke represented England at both U16 and U18 level, scoring two tries against Wales for the under-16 squad. In 2018 he toured South Africa with the under-18 squad and scored a try in the defeat against France. Quirke was subsequently selected for the under-20 squad although did not participate in any of their fixtures.

In September 2021 coach Eddie Jones included Quirke in the senior England squad for a training camp. On 13 November 2021 Quirke made his Test debut for England, coming on as a replacement for Ben Youngs in the 72nd minute against Australia in the Autumn Nations Series, a game which England won 32–15. In doing so, he became England's youngest scrum-half since Nick Duncombe in 2002. Quirke then came off the bench in England's final test of the series against South Africa, scoring the winning try in England's 27–26 victory.

Quirke was named in the initial training squad for the 2022 Six Nations Championship. In January 2025, following injuries to Alex Mitchell and Jack van Poortvliet, he was called into the senior training squad for the 2025 Six Nations.

=== International tries ===
As of 20 November 2021

Try	Opposing team	Location	Venue	Competition	Date	Result	Score
1	South Africa	London, England	Twickenham Stadium	2021 Autumn Nations Series	20 November 2021	Win	27 – 26

== Personal life ==
As a keen outdoors sports fan, Quirke also enjoys middle-distance running, cross country running, swimming, and cycling. In his music tastes, Quirke enjoys Hip-hop, Rhythm and Blues, reggae and rock, with his favourite artist being Bob Marley. Quirke is also a fan of Manchester United. He returns to Saint Ambrose to help coach the younger players.
