= So'otala Fa'aso'o =

Samoa international rugby union player

- Born: 2 October 1994 (age 32) Auckland, New Zealand
- Height: 1.95 m (6 ft 5 in)
- Weight: 130 kg (287 lb; 20 st 7 lb)
- School: St. Kentigern College; Papatoetoe High School
- University: University of Auckland

Rugby union career
- Position: Number 8
- Current team: Benetton
Senior career
Years	Team	Apps	(Points)
2013	Auckland	2	(0)
2015	Wairarapa Bush	9	(15)
2016	Counties Manukau	11	(0)
2016–2018	Racing 92	16	(10)
2018–2022	Brive	82	(90)
2022–2023	London Irish	13	(15)
2023–2025	Perpignan	40	(20)
2025–	Benetton	18	
- Correct as of 28 August 2023
International career
Years	Team	Apps	(Points)
2014	Samoa U20	3	(5)
2023–	Samoa	3	(0)
- Correct as of 28 August 2023

So'otala Fa'aso'o (born 2 October 1994) is a professional rugby union player who plays as a number eight for United Rugby Championship Italian team Benetton. Born in New Zealand, he represents Samoa at international level after qualifying on ancestry grounds.

== Early life ==
So'otala was born in Auckland and grew up in the Papatoetoe district of the city. He attended the prestigious St. Kentigern College on a rugby scholarship program which captured the attention of the Blues Rugby Team in their Under-18 structure. He played for his school in the Auckland 1A School League of which his team reached the grand final ultimately beating Kelston BHS 38-17 to win. Around this time, he had received offers from both the Crusaders and NZ Warriors as well as some league teams based in Australia. His talent was quickly noticed and was selected to play for the New Zealand Secondary School team who would play against both Australia and Samoa. He retained his enrolment for Auckland Rugby's Academy which he accepted in 2013.

== Club career ==
Fa'aso'o has had something of a nomadic career which started in 2013 with his local province, Auckland. He made 2 appearances for them before shifting south the following season to join Manawatu. He didn't manage to make the field for them so was forced to drop down to New Zealand's Heartland Championship with Wairarapa Bush in 2015. Solid performances there saw him earn another shot at Mitre 10 Cup rugby with the Pukekohe-based Counties Manukau in 2016 where he played all 11 games as the Steelers reached the Premiership Semi-Finals before going down to eventual winners Canterbury.

His appearances in New Zealand brought him to the attention of French-side Racing 92 who announced in November 2016 that they had signed Fa'aso'o on a contract until the end of the 2016–17 Top 14 season.

On 4 July 2022, Fa'aso'o would move to England to join London Irish in the Premiership Rugby from the 2022-23 season. From 2023 to summer 2025 he played for Top 14 club Perpignan.

On 5 May 2025, Fa'aso'o would join Italy region Benetton in the URC competition on a two-year deal from the 2025-26 season. He made his debut in Round 1 of the 2025–26 season against the Connacht.

== International career ==
Fa'aso'o was a member of the Samoa Under 20 side which competed in the 2014 IRB Junior World Championship in New Zealand, making 3 appearances and scoring 1 try.

== Personal life ==
He received a Bachelor of Arts degree from the University of Auckland whilst also double majoring in History and Pacific Studies.

He also goes by the nickname of Sooty or So'o.
