= Alex Lewington =

English rugby union player

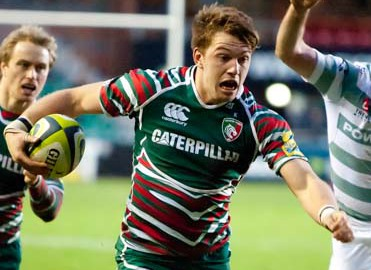
- Alex Lewington in November 2012
- Born: Alexander Lewington; 20 September 1991 (age 35) Nottingham, England
- Height: 1.83 m (6 ft 0 in)
- Weight: 76 kg (12 st 0 lb)
- University: Royal Holloway, University of London

Rugby union career
- Position: Winger
Senior career
Years	Team	Apps	(Points)
2009–2013	Leicester Tigers	8	(5)
2011-2013	Nottingham	26	(55)
2013-2018	London Irish	100	(250)
2018-2024	Saracens	97	(180)
- Correct as of 25 March 2023
International career
Years	Team	Apps	(Points)
2016	England Saxons	1	(0)
- Correct as of 29 November 2018

Alexander "Alex" Lewington (born 20 September 1991) is a retired rugby union winger.

Lewington's career started with Leicester Tigers, making appearances in the LV= Cup. Lewington moved to Nottingham before signing for London Irish for the 2013-14 season.

Lewington scored 10 tries in 10 games on his return from injury in the 2016-17 season before scoring two tries in the Championship play-off final. In January 2018, it was announced that Lewington would join Saracens for the 2018-19 season. He hit the ground running, scoring 45 points in all competitions by the end of November 2018.

Lewington played internationally for England Saxons. He wanted to make the elite England international squad, and was surprised when his performances for Saracens were overlooked by the England selectors and Eddie Jones.

On 11 April 2024, Alex announced his retirement from professional rugby at the end of the 2023-24 season after a successful stint with Saracens where he won two Premiership titles, one Championship title plus a Champions Cup title.
