= Tom Pearson (rugby union, born 1999) =

English rugby union player

- Born: 26 October 1999 (age 27) Hereford, England
- Height: 1.90 m (6 ft 3 in)
- Weight: 114 kg (251 lb; 17 st 13 lb)
- School: Dean Close School
- University: Cardiff Metropolitan University

Rugby union career
- Position: Flanker
- Current team: Northampton Saints
Senior career
Years	Team	Apps	(Points)
2018–2021	Cardiff Metropolitan	42	(0)
2021–2023	London Irish	39	(50)
2023–	Northampton Saints	53	(95)
- Correct as of 3 January 2026
International career
Years	Team	Apps	(Points)
2023–	England	1	(0)
- Correct as of 6th May 2025

Tom Pearson (born 26 October 1999) is an English professional rugby union player who plays as a flanker for Premiership Rugby club Northampton Saints and the England national team.

== Early life ==
Pearson began playing rugby at six years old at his local rugby club in Bromyard, Herefordshire, before going on to play for Luctonians, also in Herefordshire. He attended Moor Park Prep, Dean Close School and Cardiff Metropolitan University where he represented the first team. Pearson played 42 times for the university across both the local Welsh league and the BUCS Super Rugby competition.

== Club career ==
Pearson had been a member of the Gloucester academy but was released as a teenager. He signed for London Irish on 21 June 2021. He made his senior club debut away to Exeter Chiefs on 23 October 2021 and was named Player of the Match in an Irish win.

On 8 February 2022 Pearson was called up by coach Eddie Jones to train with England during the 2022 Six Nations Championship. Pearson scored his first try for Irish as they beat Bristol Bears on 11 February 2022. In the 2022–23 season Pearson was named as both Premiership Rugby's Breakthrough player of the year and as the Rugby Players' Association's young player of the season.

In June 2023 London Irish announced that Pearson would join Northampton Saints for the 2023–24 season. Later that month he was selected by England coach Steve Borthwick for a training camp preparing for the 2023 Rugby World Cup. On 5 August Pearson made his Test debut starting in a warm-up defeat against Wales.

== Honours ==
Northampton

- Premiership Rugby: 2023–24, 2025–26
- European Rugby Champions Cup runner-up: 2024–25

== Personal life ==
Pearson attended a boarding school in Cheltenham, Gloucestershire from Year nine with his twin brother Will Pearson, who also played for Luctonians. He was in Tower House and also played 1XI Cricket.
