= 2023–24 Premiership Rugby Cup =

Rugby Union Cup tournament in England

- Countries: England; Jersey
- Number of teams: 22
- Date: 8 September 2023 – 15 March 2024
- Champions: Gloucester (1st title)
- Runners-up: Leicester Tigers
- Matches played: 56
- Attendance: 253,039 (average 4,519 per match)
- Highest attendance: 14,460 – Gloucester v Leicester Tigers, 15 March 2024
- Lowest attendance: 384 – London Scottish v Jersey Reds, 10 September 2023
- Tries scored: 481 (average 8.6 per match)
- Top point scorer: 46 – George Barton (Gloucester)
- Top try scorer: 8 – Jack Clement (Gloucester)

Official website
- www.premiershiprugby.com

The 2023–24 Premiership Rugby Cup is the 51st season of England's national rugby union cup competition and the first under the new Premiership Rugby Cup format including clubs from both the Premiership and Championship. Exeter Chiefs are the reigning champions.

Gloucester would finish as the first ever Premiership Rugby Cup champions, defeating Leicester Tigers 23–13 in the final at Kingsholm on 15 March 2024.

== Competition format ==
The original plan for the competition involved dividing the 24 teams from the top two tiers of English rugby into four pools of six. The number of teams dropped to 22 following the suspension of Wasps and London Irish.

The 22 teams were split into four pools, two of 6 teams (Pool A & Pool B) and two of 5 teams (Pool C & Pool D). The teams were seeded based on league standings at the end of the 2022–23 season. (Note: London Scottish and Cambridge, the 11th and 12th seeds in the 2022–23 RFU Championship, were swapped with Nottingham and Caldy, the 9th and 10th seeds. This is so Nottingham and Caldy could host a home fixture against a Premiership club.) (Note: Leicester Tigers and Exeter Chiefs swapped pools for operational reasons.) Teams in Pools C and D also played one cross-pool fixture along with their own pool games.

== Teams ==
Locations of Premiership Rugby Cup teams
Premiership Rugby Cup clubs in Greater London

Club	Director of Rugby/ Head coach	League	Stadium	Capacity	City/Area
Ampthill	(Wales) Paul Turner	Championship	Dillingham Park	3,000	Ampthill, Bedfordshire
Bath	(South Africa) Johann van Graan	Premiership	The Recreation Ground	14,509	Bath, Somerset
Bedford Blues	(Wales) Mike Rayer	Championship	Goldington Road	5,000	Bedford, Bedfordshire
Bristol Bears	(Samoa) Pat Lam	Premiership	Ashton Gate	27,000	Bristol
Caldy	(England) Matt Cairns	Championship	Paton Field	4,000	Thurstaston, Wirral, Merseyside
Cambridge	(England) Richie Williams	Championship	Grantchester Road	2,200	Cambridge, Cambridgeshire
Cornish Pirates	(England) Alan Paver (Note: Joint Head Coach) (Wales) Gavin Cattle	Championship	Mennaye Field	4,000	Penzance, Cornwall
Coventry	(England) Alex Rae	Championship	Butts Park Arena	5,200	Coventry, West Midlands
Doncaster Knights	(England) Steve Boden	Championship	Castle Park	5,183	Doncaster, South Yorkshire
Ealing Trailfinders	(England) Ben Ward	Championship	Trailfinders Sports Ground	5,000	West Ealing, London
Exeter Chiefs	(England) Rob Baxter (Note: Director of Rugby) (England) Ali Hepher (Note: Head Coach)	Premiership	Sandy Park	15,600	Exeter, Devon
Gloucester	(England) George Skivington	Premiership	Kingsholm	16,115	Gloucester, Gloucestershire
Harlequins	(Australia) Billy Millard	Premiership	Twickenham Stoop	14,800	Twickenham, Greater London
Hartpury	(England) Mark Cornwell	Championship	The ALPAS Arena	2,000	Hartpury, Gloucestershire
Jersey Reds	(South Africa) Harvey Biljon	Championship	Stade Santander International	4,000	Saint Peter, Jersey
Leicester Tigers	(Australia) Dan McKellar	Premiership	Mattioli Woods Welford Road	25,849	Leicester, Leicestershire
London Scottish	(England) Joe Gray	Championship	Athletic Ground	4,500	Richmond, London
Newcastle Falcons	(England) Alex Codling	Premiership	Kingston Park	10,200	Newcastle upon Tyne, Tyne and Wear
Northampton Saints	(England) Phil Dowson (England) Sam Vesty	Premiership	cinch Stadium at Franklin's Gardens	15,200	Northampton, Northamptonshire
Nottingham	(New Zealand) Craig Hammond	Championship	Lady Bay Sports Ground	3,500	Nottingham, Nottinghamshire
Sale Sharks	(England) Alex Sanderson (England) Paul Deacon	Premiership	AJ Bell Stadium	12,000	Salford, Greater Manchester
Saracens	(Ireland) Mark McCall (England) Joe Shaw	Premiership	StoneX Stadium	10,500	Hendon, Greater London

== Pools ==
Teams played every other team in their pool once, either home or away. Teams in pools C and D also played one cross-pool fixture along with their own pool games.

- If teams are level at any stage, tiebreakers are applied in the following order:
1. Number of matches won
2. Difference between points for and against
3. Total number of points for
4. Total number of tries scored

=== Pool A ===
Pool A
Pos	Team	Pld	W	D	L	PD	TB	LB	Pts	Qualification
1	Gloucester (Q)	5	5	0	0	+72	4	0	24	Qualified for the semi-finals as pool winner
2	Harlequins	5	3	1	1	+63	3	0	17	
3	Coventry	5	2	2	1	+29	4	1	17	
4	Saracens	5	2	0	3	+72	3	1	12	
5	Nottingham	5	0	1	4	−100	2	1	5	
6	Hartpury University	5	1	0	4	−136	1	0	5	

Updated to match(es) played on 17/10/2023. Source: Premiership Rugby; tntsports.co.uk
(Q) Qualified for the phase indicated

=== Pool B ===
Pool B
Pos	Team	Pld	W	D	L	PD	TB	LB	Pts	Qualification
1	Leicester Tigers (Q)	5	4	0	1	+132	4	0	20	Qualified for the semi-finals as pool winner
2	Newcastle Falcons	5	4	0	1	+46	3	0	19	
3	Sale Sharks	5	3	0	2	+99	3	1	16	
4	Bedford Blues	5	3	0	2	−13	2	0	14	
5	Caldy	5	1	0	4	−118	2	0	6	
6	Ampthill	5	0	0	5	−146	0	2	2	

Updated to match(es) played on 17/10/2023. Source: Premiership Rugby; tntsports.co.uk
(Q) Qualified for the phase indicated

=== Pool C ===
Pool C
Pos	Team	Pld	W	D	L	PD	TB	LB	Pts	Qualification
1	Exeter Chiefs (Q)	5	4	0	1	+138	4	0	20	Qualified for the semi-finals as pool winner
2	Bath	5	3	0	2	+37	4	1	17	
3	Cornish Pirates (Note: Fixture against Jersey Reds was cancelled, Cornish Pirates were awarded a 20-0 victory and 5 league points)	5	3	0	2	+72	3	1	16	
4	Jersey Reds (Note: The fixture against Cornish Pirates & Ealing Trailfinders were cancelled, Cornish Pirates and Ealing Trailfinders were both awarded a 20-0 victory and 5 league points, Jersey was awarded 0 league points)	5	2	0	3	+46	2	0	10	
5	London Scottish	5	0	0	5	−154	1	1	2	

Updated to match(es) played on 17/10/2023. Source: Premiership Rugby; tntsports.co.uk
(Q) Qualified for the phase indicated

=== Pool D ===
Pool D
Pos	Team	Pld	W	D	L	PD	TB	LB	Pts	Qualification
1	Ealing Trailfinders (Note: Fixture against Jersey Reds was cancelled, Ealing Trailfinders were awarded a 20-0 victory and 5 league points) (Q)	5	5	0	0	+99	4	0	24	Qualified for the semi-finals as pool winner
2	Northampton Saints	5	3	0	2	+94	4	1	17	
3	Bristol Bears	5	3	0	2	+10	3	0	15	
4	Doncaster Knights	5	2	0	3	−59	4	1	13	
5	Cambridge	5	0	0	5	−243	0	0	0	

Updated to match(es) played on 17/10/2023. Source: Premiership Rugby; tntsports.co.uk
(Q) Qualified for the phase indicated

== Fixtures ==
=== Round 1 ===
==== Pool A ====
9 September 2023
15:00

(1 BP) Gloucester	42–14	Nottingham
Try: Clement (2) 3' c, 55' c Dunn 11' c Hathaway 21' c Morris 31' c Penalty Try 44'; Con: Barton (5/5) 4', 12', 22', 32', 56'	Report	Try: Joussain 46' c Graham 63' c Con: Hollingsworth (1/1) 47'; Bunting (1/1) 64'

Kingsholm Stadium, Gloucester
Attendance: 4,124
Referee: George Selwood

9 September 2023
15:00

(1 BP) Harlequins	54–14	Hartpury
Try: Cleaves (3) 2' c, 34' c, 38' c Trenholm (2) 6' c, 11' c Bradley 20' c Slevin 62' c Zheng 78' c Con: Slevin (8/8) 2', 7', 12', 21', 36', 39', 63'	Report	Try: Short 32' c Hayler 65' c Con: Mathews (2/2) 32', 66'

Twickenham Stoop, London
Attendance: 3,783
Referee: Mike Hudson

9 September 2023
16:00

(1 BP) Coventry	28–14	Saracens
Try: Ma'asi 16' c Wand 40' c Hutler 43' c Pellegrini 78' c Con: Pellegrini (4/4) 16', 41', 43', 78'	Report	Try: Harris (2) 9' c, 37' c Con: Vunipola (2/2) 11', 38'

Butts Park Arena, Coventry
Attendance: 4,109
Referee: Joe James

==== Pool B ====
9 September 2023
15:00

(1 BP) Leicester Tigers	50–6	Caldy
Try: Hassell-Collins 2' c Whiteley 35' c Ilione (2) 45' m, 70' m van Wyk 48' m Atkinson 58' c Cokanasiga 72' c Shillcock 76' c Con: Shillcock (5/8) 3', 36', 59', 72', 77'	Report	Pen: Rogers (2) 24', 29'

Welford Road Stadium, Leicester
Attendance: 5,600
Referee: Hamish Smales

9 September 2023
15:00

Ampthill	17–40	Newcastle Falcons (1 BP)
Try: Skelcey 10' c Bacon 73' c Con: Parks (2/2) 12', 74'; Pen: Parks (1/1) 42'	Report	Try: Stevenson 21' m Lockwood 31' c Stephens (2) 47' c, 50' c Pepper 63' c McDonald 76' c Con: Connon (5/6) 32', 48', 51', 64', 77'; Pen: Connon (0/1)

Dillingham Park, Ampthill
Attendance: 997
Referee: Alex Thomas

9 September 2023
17:30

(1 BP) Sale Sharks	47–12	Bedford Blues
Try: Thomas (2) 5' c, 52' c Caine (2) 15' c, 33' m Ene 23' c Reed 39' c Birch 69' c Con: Curtis (6/7) 6', 16', 24', 40', 52', 70'	Report	Try: Lennon 36' m French 60' c Con: Maisey (1/2) 61'

Salford City Stadium, Greater Manchester
Attendance: 4,000
Referee: Ian Tempest

==== Pool C ====
8 September 2023
19:30

(1 BP) Cornish Pirates	23–29	Bath (1 BP)
Try: Grubb 27' m Trewin 65' c Moyle 78' m Con: Pittman (0/1); Jenkins (1/2) 67'; Pen: Pittman (2/2) 8', 23'	Report	Try: Richards 13' c Stewart 37' m Worboys 52' c Harris 74' c Con: Worboys (3/4) 14', 53', 75'; Pen: Worboys (1/1) 34'

Mennaye Field, Penzance
Attendance: 2,891
Referee: Hamish Grant

10 September 2023
14:00

London Scottish	0–43	Jersey Reds (1 BP)
	Report	Try: Sullivan 14' m Scott 23' c Owen 40' m Elliott 43' c Hadfield (2) 56' c, 70' m Chapman 78' c Con: Bennett (4/7) 23', 43', 57', 78'

Athletic Ground, London
Attendance: 384
Referee: Andy Wigley

==== Pool C/D ====
9 September 2023
15:00

(1 BP) Exeter Chiefs	75–0	Bristol Bears
Try: Vermeulen (2) 1' c, 48' m Cairns (2) 6' c, 30' c Slade 22' c Hodge 38' c Postlethwaite 41' c Hammersley 45' c Frost 54' c Roots 58' c Vintcent 66' c Con: Slade (8/9) 2',7', 23', 31', 39', 42', 46', 55'; Skinner (2/2) 60', 67'	Report

Sandy Park, Exeter
Attendance: 8,328
Referee: Sara Cox

==== Pool D ====
8 September 2023
19:30

(1 BP) Doncaster Knights	38–11	Cambridge
Try: Simpson 8' m Holden (2) 38' c, 78' c Tait 40' + 1 c Cant (2) 43' c, 37' m Con: Dolly (3/5) 39', 40' + 3, 44'; Holden (1/1) 73'	Report	Try: Veness 61' m Con: James (0/1); Pen: James (2/2) 11', 24'

Castle Park, Doncaster
Attendance: 1,156
Referee: Andrew Jackson

10 September 2023
13:00

(1 BP) Ealing Trailfinders	48–22	Northampton Saints
Try: Earle (2) 3' c, 39' m Uzokwe 7' c O'Brien 12' c Willemse 35' m Cornish 49' m Kelleher 57' m Holmes 75' c Con: Shingler (3/7) 4', 8', 13'; Houston (1/1) 76'	Report	Try: Glister (2) 1' c, 43' c Cruse 70' m Con: Grayson (2/3) 2', 44'; Pen: Grayson (1/1) 18'

Trailfinders Sports Ground, London
Attendance: 1,517
Referee: Dan Jones

=== Round 2 ===
==== Pool A ====
15 September 2023
19:45

(1 BP) Nottingham	17–21	Hartpury
Try: Wright 7' m (2) Clayton 71' m, 79 c Con: Bunting (0/1); Graham (1/2) 79'	Report	Try: Hayler 3' c Morgan 30' m Con: Bazalgette (1/2) 4'; Pen: Bazalgette (2/2) 38', 49'; Mathews (1/1) 76'

Lady Bay Sports Ground, Nottingham
Attendance: 858
Referee: Richard Gordon

16 September 2023
14:00

Saracens	20–29	Gloucester (1 BP)
Try: Willis 3' c Isiekwe 29' c Con: Vunipola (2/2) 4', 30'; Pen: Vunipola (2/2) 43', 54'	Report	Try: Morris 19' m Hillman-Cooper 40' m Clement 46' c Blake 65' c Barton 78' m Con: Barton (2/5) 47', 66'

Barnet Copthall, London
Attendance: 2,904
Referee: Adam Leal

16 September 2023
15:00

Harlequins	21–21	Coventry
Try: Jibulu 3' c Slevin 52' c Jurevicius 77' c Con: Slevin (3/3) 5', 53', 77'	Report	Try: Rigg (2) 6' c, 42' c Hutler 31' c Con: Pellegrini (3/3) 7', 32', 42'

Twickenham Stoop, London
Attendance: 4,631
Referee: Sara Cox

==== Pool B ====
15 September 2023
19:45

(1 BP) Sale Sharks	14–18	Leicester Tigers
Try: Caine 51' c Onasanya 79' c Con: Curtis (2/2) 52', 79'; Pen: Curtis (0/1)	Report	Try: Hassell-Collins 54' c Bassett 61' m Con: Pollard (1/2) 55'; Pen: Atkinson (2/3) 36', 42'

Salford City Stadium, Greater Manchester
Attendance: 3,321
Referee: Ian Tempest

15 September 2023
19:45

(1 BP) Newcastle Falcons	26–16	Bedford Blues
Try: Fletcher 9' c Kerr 30' m de Chaves 65' c Radwan 71' c Con: Thomas (1/2) 10'; Johnson (2/2) 66', 73'	Report	Try: French 52' c Con: Grimoldby (1/1) 53'; Pen: Grimoldby (2/3) 6', 43'; French (1/2) 51'

Kingston Park, Newcastle
Attendance: 3,117
Referee: George Selwood

16 September 2023
15:00

(1 BP) Caldy	26–22	Ampthill (1 BP)
Try: Aigbokhae 13' c Gallagher (2) 40' + 1 c, 47' m Hearn 80' + 2 c Con: Rogers (1/1) 13'; Kilcourse (1/2) 40' + 1 Hayes (1/1) 80' + 3	Report	Try: Strong 7' c Dawkins (2) 19' m, 25' c Con: Parks (2/3) 7', 26'; Pen: Parks (1/1) 74'

Paton Field, Thurstaston
Attendance: 1,500
Referee: Andrew Jackson

==== Pool C ====
16 September 2023
13:00

Bath	10–34	Jersey Reds (1 BP)
Try: Harris 20' m Muir 35' m Con: Worboys (0/2)	Report	Try: Scott 26' m McHenry 50' c Holgate 54' c Hadfield (2) 64' m, 72' m Bennett 68' m Con: Bennett (2/6) 51', 55'; Pen: Bennett (0/1)

Recreation Ground, Bath
Attendance: 7,431
Referee: Anthony Woodthorpe

16 September 2023
15:00

(1 BP) Exeter Chiefs	38–13	Cornish Pirates
Try: Wyatt (2) 10' c, 64' c Vintcent (2) 14' m, 54' c Hammersley 43' c Hodge 73' m Con: Haydon-Wood (3/4) 12', 44', 55'; Skinner (1/2) 55'; Pen: Hodge (0/1)	Report	Try: Dawson 6' m Trewin 23' m Con: Jenkins (0/2); Pen: Jenkins (1/1) 22'

Sandy Park, Exeter
Attendance: 8,072
Referee: Simon Harding

==== Pool C/D ====
16 September 2023
15:00

(1 BP) London Scottish	24–22	Doncaster Knights (1 BP)
Try: Waghorn (2) 18' c, 43' m Lloyd-Seed 24' m Brown 54' m Con: Lloyd-Seed (1/4) 19'	Report	Try: Edwards 7' c Morris 46' c Wilson 63' m Metcalfe 78' m Con: McBryde (2/2) 7', 47'; Parkin (0/2)

Athletic Ground, London
Attendance: 387
Referee: Harry Walbaum

==== Pool D ====
16 September 2023
15:00

(1 BP) Northampton Saints	55–5	Cambridge
Try: Seabrook 4'c Pollock (2) 8' c, 59' c Thame (2) 31' m, 33' c McParland 37' c Glister 47' m Hendy 52' c Con: Grayson (6/8) 5', 9', 34', 39', 53', 60'; Pen: Grayson (1/1) 3'	Report	Try: Caven 63' m Con: James (0/1)

Franklin's Gardens, Northampton
Attendance: 5,186
Referee: Jonathan Cook

17 September 2023
14:30

Bristol Bears	12–28	Ealing Trailfinders
Try: Marmion 6' c Williams 29' m Con: Sheedy (1/2) 7'	Report	Try: Smid 9' m Earle 38' c Cornish 48' c Con: Shingler (2/3) 40', 49'; Pen: Shingler (3/3) 55', 58', 79'

Ashton Gate, Bristol
Attendance: 10,136
Referee: Joe James

=== Round 3 ===
==== Pool A ====
22 September 2023
19:45

Gloucester	25–17	Harlequins
Try: Reeves 4' m Jones 9' c Morris 17' c Con: Evans (2/3) 10', 18'; Pen: Evans (2/3) 15', 69'	Report	Try: Riley 32' c Joseph 39' c Con: Edwards (2/2) 33', 40'; Pen: Edwards (1/2) 65'

Kingsholm Stadium, Gloucester
Attendance: 8,824
Referee: Adam Leal

23 September 2023
14:00

(1 BP) Saracens	73–29	Nottingham (1 BP)
Try: Lewington 7' m Segun 12' c Knight (2) 28' c, 52' c Van Zyl (2) 33' c, 47' c Penalty try 37'; Woolstencroft 41' m Stonham 57' c Hartley 60' c Adejimi 69' c Con: Vunipola (8/10) 13', 29', 34', 48', 53', 58', 61', 70'	Report	Try: Mee 17' m Ramage (2) 44' c, 77' c Williams (2) 63' m, 66' m Con: Hollingsworth (1/2) 45'; Bunting (1/3) 78'

Barnet Copthall, London
Attendance: 2,896
Referee: Harry Walbaum

23 September 2023
14:30

Hartpury	19–35	Coventry (1 BP)
Try: Short 66' c Penalty try 75'; Duncan 80' + 2 Con: Chamberlain (1/2) 67'	Report	Try: Titherington 6' c Mitchell 24' c Ryan 43' c Hutler (2) 62' c, 80' c Con: Mitchell (5/5) 6', 25', 43', 63', 80' + 1

The ALPAS Arena, Hartpury
Attendance: 550
Referee: Jonathan Cook

==== Pool B ====
22 September 2023
19:45

Newcastle Falcons	23–10	Sale Sharks
Try: Radwan 15' c Penalty try 28'; Con: Connon (1/1) 16'; Pen: Connon (3/4) 31', 59', 61'	Report	Try: Onasanya 74' c Con: Curtis (1/1) 75'; Pen: Curtis (1/1) 47'

Kingston Park, Newcastle
Attendance: 3,751
Referee: Sara Cox

23 September 2023
15:00

(1 BP) Bedford Blues	32–24	Caldy (1 BP)
Try: Adamson 28' c King 34' m Conway 43' c Venter 53' c Con: Maisey (3/4) 29', 43', 54'; Pen: Maisey (2/2) 40' + 2, 74'	Report	Try: Aigbokhae 3' m Atkinson 9' c Gallagher (2) 65' c, 79'; Con: Barker (2/4) 10', 67 '

Goldington Road, Bedford
Attendance: 2,153
Referee: Mike Hudson

24 September 2023
15:00

(1 BP) Leicester Tigers	64–14	Ampthill
Try: Dolly (3) 4' m, 23' c, 35' m Whiteley 9' c Ilione 13' c Simmons 16' m Hatherell 54' c Vanes 60' c Porter 73' c Van Wyk 80' c Con: Shillcock (7/10) 10', 14', 24', 55', 61', 74', 81'	Report	Try: Bracken 26' c Nearchou 42' c Con: Parks (2/2) 27, 43

Welford Road Stadium
Attendance: 6,533
Referee: Alex Thomas

==== Pool C ====
23 September 2023
14:00

Jersey Reds	22–43	Exeter Chiefs (1 BP)
Try: Van Breda 2' c Sullivan 41' m McHenry 74' c Con: Bennett (1/2) 3'; Barton 75'	Report	Try: Feyi-Waboso 9' m Vermeulen 22' m Wyatt (2) 38' c, 44' c Fisilau 48' m Relton 56' c Davis 60' c Con: Slade (4/7) 40', 45', 57', 62'; Drop: Skinner (0/1)

St. Peter, St Peter
Attendance: 1,826
Referee: Dan Jones

23 September 2023
14:00

(1 BP) Bath	47–11	London Scottish
Try: Annett 7' c Hennessey 20' m Cloete 34' c Lee-Warner 66' c De Glanville (2) 73' c, 77' c Con: Francis (5/6) 8', 35', 67', 74', 78'	Report	Try: Waghorn 82' m Con: Lloyd-Seed (0/1); Pen: Lloyd-Seed (2/3) 5', 24'

Recreation Ground, Bath
Attendance: 7,285
Referee: George Selwood

==== Pool C/D ====
23 September 2023
15:00

Cambridge	17–64	Cornish Pirates (1 BP)
Try: Hema 4' c Caven 15' m Dawson 76' m Con: James 5' (1/2); Rayner (0/1)	Report	Try: Moyle 2' m Dugmore 9' m Schwarz 17' c Jenkins 41' c Trewin (2) 43' c, 55' m McNab 64' c Nelson (2) 70' c, 78' c Gibson 74' c Con: Jenkins (3/6) 18', 42', 44'; Pittman (4/4) 65', 71', 74', 78'; Pen: Jenkins (0/1)

Grantchester Road, Cambridge
Attendance: 1,027
Referee: Ian Tempest

==== Pool D ====
23 September 2023
14:30

(1 BP) Bristol Bears	39–38	Northampton Saints (2 BP)
Try: Thacker 8' c Caulfield 12' c Bates 30' c Marmion 66' c Ibitoye 78' m Con: MacGinty (3/3) 10', 13', 31'; Sheedy (1/2) 67'; Pen: MacGinty (1/1) 26'; Sheedy 57' (1/1)	Report	Try: Seabrook 7' m Hendy 16' m Freeman (2) 25' c, 35' c Ramm 60' c Thame 69' c Con: Smith (2/4) 23', 35'; Furbank (2/2) 60', 70'

Ashton Gate, Bristol
Attendance: 11,356
Referee: Joe James

23 September 2023
15:00

(1 BP) Ealing Trailfinders	34–32	Doncaster Knights (2 BP)
Try: Homes 17' c Bird-Tulloch 26' m O'Brien 33' c Cornish 48' c Smid 67' m Con: Shingler (3/5) 18', 34', 49'; Pen: Shingler (1/2) 77'	Report	Try: Nagle-Taylor 23' m Smeaton 29' c Davey 57' c Metcalf 63' c Con: McBryde (3/4) 30', 58', 63'; Pen: McBryde (2/3) 4', 39'; Drop: McBryde (0/1)

Trailfinders Sports Ground, London
Attendance: 590
Referee: Hamish Grant

=== Round 4 ===
==== Pool A ====
29 September 2023
19:45

Hartpury	14–40	Gloucester (1 BP)
Try: Denty 1' m Pen: Bazalgette (2/2) 57', 59'; Drop: Bazalgette (0/1)	Report	Try: Clement (3) 20' m, 68' c, 73' c Blake 39' c Jones 52' c Socino 82' c Con: Barton (5/6) 39', 53', 69', 74', 83'

The Alpas Arena, Hartpury
Attendance: 2,042
Referee: Mike Hudson

30 September 2023
16:00

(1 BP) Coventry	33–33	Nottingham (1 BP)
Try: Anstey 11' c Nkwocha 18' c Mitchell 25' c Kvesic 47' c Martin 58' m Con: Mitchell (4/5) 12', 19', 27', 48'; Pen: Mitchell (0/1)	Report	Try: Stronge 23' c Hollingsworth 34' c Williams (2) 42' m, 63' c Mee 70' c Con: Hollingsworth (2/3) 24', 35'; Bunting (2/2) 64', 71'

Butts Park Arena, Coventry
Attendance: 2,122
Referee: Jonathan Cook

1 October 2023
14:30

(1 BP) Harlequins	36–29	Saracens (2 BP)
Try: Lynagh 4' c Murley 9' c Collier 12 c' David 50' m Joseph 55' c Con: Edwards (3/4) 5', 10', 14'; Slevin (1/1) 55'; Pen: Edwards (1/1) 37'	Report	Try: Knight 16' m Lozowski 29' c Simpson 63' c Elliott 75' c Con: Vunipola (3/4) 31', 63', 76'; Pen: Vunipola (1/1) 6'

Twickenham Stoop, London
Attendance: 7,735
Referee: Craig Maxwell-Keys

==== Pool B ====
30 September 2023
15:00

Caldy	7–24	Sale Sharks (1 BP)
Try: Wilkinson 46' c Con: Barker (1/1) 46'	Report	Try: J. Du Preez (2) 4' m, 35' c Dugdale 42' m Bamber 80' c Con: Warr (1/3) 36'; R. Du Preesz (1/1) 81'

Paton Field, Thurstaston
Attendance: 2,687
Referee: Hamish Grant

30 September 2023
15:00

(1 BP) Leicester Tigers	60–7	Newcastle Falcons
Try: Liebenberg (2) 2' m, 58' c Clare (2) 8'm, 36' m Powell (2) 18' c, 42' c Porter 24' m Van Wyk 31' m Rogerson 73' c Whiteley 78' c Con: Atkinson (5/10) 18', 43', 58', 74', 79'	Report	Try: Blamire 43' c Con: Connon (1/1) 44'

Welford Road Stadium, Leicester
Attendance: 8,000
Referee: George Selwood

30 September 2023
15:00

(1 BP) Ampthill	19–24	Bedford Blues
Try: Bacon 7' m Bracken 24' c Morris 43' c Con: Parks (2/3) 24', 44'	Report	Try: Conway 37' c Howard 63' c French 76' c Con: Grimoldby (3/3) 38', 64', 78'; Pen: Grimoldby (1/1) 81'

Dillingham Park, Ampthill
Attendance: 1,734
Referee: Hamish Smales

==== Pool C ====
29 September 2023
19:30

Cornish Pirates	Cancelled (Note: Cancelled as Jersey Reds announced that they had ceased trading and were likely to enter liquidation.Cornish Pirates were awarded with 5 league table points and Jersey Reds were awarded 0 league table points.)	Jersey Reds

Mennaye Field, Penzance

30 September 2023
15:00

(1 BP) Exeter Chiefs	47–10	London Scottish
Try: Vintcent (3) 15' c, 41' c, 55' m Relton 24' c Armstrong 40' c Snow 70' c Burrows 77' c Con: Haydon-Wood (6/7) 17', 25', 41', 41', 71', 78'	Report	Try: Kerins 58' m Brown 66' m Con: Anderson (0/2)

Sandy Park, Exeter
Attendance: 6,906
Referee: Harry Walbaum

==== Pool C/D ====
30 September 2023
15:00

(1 BP) Northampton Saints	43–42	Bath (2 BP)
Try: Freeman (3) 19' c, 46' c, 66'; Waller 28' c Davison 35' m Langdon 55' m Seabrook 68' c Con: Smith (4/7) 20', 29', 47', 69'	Report	Try: Dunn 1'; Hill 12'; Ojomoh 16'; De Glanville (2) 23', 45'; Underhill 40'; Con: Spencer (6/6) 2', 13', 17', 24', 40', 45'

Franklin's Gardens, Northampton
Attendance: 10,356
Referee: Anthony Woodthorpe

==== Pool D ====
29 September 2023
19:30

(1 BP) Doncaster Knights	41–57	Bristol Bears (1 BP)
Try: Davey (2) 12' c, 82' c Holden 24' m Doughty 40' c Davidson 45' c Ehizode 57' m Con: Olver (4/6) 13', 41', 45', 82'; Pen: Olver (1/1) 9'	Report	Try: Capon 10' c Owen (2) 19' c, 21' c Holmes 31' c Rowson 35' c Marmion 49' c Kloska 60' m O'Conor 66' c Con: Worsley (7/8) 11', 20', 22', 31', 36', 50', 67'; Pen: Worsley (1/1) 27'

Castle Park, Doncaster
Attendance: 2,175
Referee: Adam Leal

30 September 2023
15:00

Cambridge	17–52	Ealing Trailfinders (1 BP)
Try: Hanks 22' c Veness 47' c Con: James (2/2) 23', 48'; Pen: James (1/1) 35'	Report	Try: Davidson (2) 14' c, 42' c Taylor 18' m, 67' c Walker 29' c Smid 59' c Montgomery 79' c Cornish 84' m Con: Shingler (6/8) 15', 30', 43', 59', 67', 79'

Grantchester Road, Cambridge
Attendance: 998
Referee: Richard Gordon

=== Round 5 ===
==== Pool A ====
7 October 2023
13:00

(1 BP) Gloucester	32–31	Coventry (2 BP)
Try: Hillman-Cooper 7' m Hearle 12' c Clement (2) 33' m, 58' c Thorley 79' m Con: Hastings 13' (1/2); Barton 59' (1/3); Pen: Barton (1/1) 55'	Report	Try: Chudley 3' c Martin 29' m Smith 63' c Hutler 70' m Wand 75' c Con: Mitchell (3/5) 3', 64', 76'

Kingsholm Stadium, Gloucester
Attendance: 8,233
Referee: Harry Walbaum

7 October 2023
14:00

Nottingham	21–45	Harlequins (1 BP)
Try: Valentine 29' c Stronge 41' c Tiueti 42' c Con: Hollingsworth (3/3) 30', 41', 43'	Report	Try: Browne 3' m White 13' c Anderson (2) 18' c, 26' c Head 45' m Gjaltema 46' c Musk 64' c Con: Edwards (5/7) 14', 19', 27', 47', 65',

Lady Bay Sports Ground, Nottingham
Attendance: 2,402
Referee: Alex Thomas

7 October 2023
14:00

(1 BP) Saracens	68–10	Hartpury
Try: Segun (2) 13' m, 31' c Hartley 46' c Adejimi (2) 50' c, 57' c Davies 53' c Knight (2) 60' c, 77' c Stonham 72' c Parton 80' c Con: Lozowski (6/7) 32', 47', 51', 54', 58', 61'; Simpson (3/3) 73', 78', 81'	Report	Try: Smith 71' c Con: Bazalgette (1/1) 72'; Pen: Bazalgette (1/1) 20'

Barnet Copthall, London
Attendance: 2,146
Referee: Andrew Wigley

==== Pool B ====
6 October 2023
19:45

(1 BP) Sale Sharks	64–0	Ampthill
Try: James 1' m Dugdale (4) 9' c, 23' c, 29' c, 59' c Taylor 14' m Bedlow (2) 39' c, 65' m Carpenter 68' c Roebuck 73' c Con: Du Preez (4/6) 10', 24', 30', 40'; Warr (3/4) 60', 69', 75'	Report

Salford City Stadium, Greater Manchester
Attendance: 411
Referee: Hamish Grant

7 October 2023
15:00

(1 BP) Bedford Blues	47–28	Leicester Tigers (1 BP)
Try: Litchfield 4' c Howard 13' m Adamson 47' c Worley 50' c King 61' c Conway 70' c French 80' c Con: Maisey (3/4) 5', 47', 50'; Grimoldby (3/3) 61', 70', 81'	Report	Try: Woodward (2) 9' c, 33' c Penalty try 31'; Woollett 58' c Con: Wilkinson (3/3) 9', 34', 58'

Goldington Road, Bedford
Attendance: 3,707
Referee: Anthony Woodthorpe

8 October 2023
14:15

(1 BP) Newcastle Falcons	66–13	Caldy
Try: Stephens (2) 1' c, 59' c Douglas 26' c van Vuuren 33' c Wacokecoke 38' m Fletcher 49' m Brown (2) 56' c, 76' c Pepper 63' c Johnson 67' c Con: Johnson (8/10) 2', 27', 33', 57'. 60', 64', 69', 77'	Report	Try: Stagg 18' m Kilcourse 54' m Con: Kilcourse (0/2); Pen: Kilcourse (1/1) 24'

Kingston Park, Newcastle
Attendance: 2,812
Referee: Richard Gordon

==== Pool C ====
6 October 2023
19:45

London Scottish	14–50	Cornish Pirates (1 BP)
Try: Mehson 60' c Panday 76' c Con: Haydon (2/2) 61', 77'	Report	Try: Dugmore 6' c Evans 9' c Trewin 15' m Nelson (2) 43' c, 55' c McNab (2) 66' m, 73' m Bokenham 80' c Con: Pittman (5/8) 7', 11', 44', 56', 80'

Athletic Ground, London
Attendance: 661
Referee: Simon Harding

7 October 2023
14:00

(1 BP) Bath	34–14	Exeter Chiefs
Try: Annett 3' c De Glanville 14' c Francis 35' m Muir 38' c Ojomoh 76'; Con: Francis (3/4) 4', 15', 39'; Bailey (0/1); Pen: Francis (1/1) 7'	Report	Try: Iosefa-Scott 66' c Hodge 71' c Con: Slade (2/2) 67', 72'

Recreation Ground, Bath
Attendance: 9,426
Referee: Adam Leal

==== Pool C/D ====
6 October 2023
19:30

Jersey Reds	Cancelled (Note: Cancelled as Jersey Reds announced that they had ceased trading and were likely to enter liquidation. Ealing Trailfinders were awarded with 5 league table points and Jersey Reds were awarded 0 league table points.)	Ealing Trailfinders

St. Peter, St Peter

==== Pool D ====
6 October 2023
19:45

(1 BP) Bristol Bears	98–14	Cambridge
Try: Thacker (3) 3' m, 20' m, 35' m Lane (2) 8' m, 47' c Bradbury 12' m Caulfield 15' c Thomas (4) 24' c, 50' m, 60' c, 72' c Harding 41' c Marmion 54' c Ibitoye (3) 56' c, 62' c, 79' c Con: MacGinty 16', 25' (2/7); Williams (2/3) 42', 48'; Sheedy (5/6) 54', 57', 61', 73', 81'	Report	Try: Dawson 31' c James 78' c Con: James (1/1) 32'; Rayner (1/1) 79'

Ashton Gate, Bristol
Attendance: 11,162
Referee: Jack Makepeace

7 October 2023
14:45

Northampton Saints	82–12	Doncaster Knights
Try: Pearson (2) 2' c, 27' c Furbank 12' c McParland (3) 37' c, 45' c, 50' c Graham 41' c Smith 47' c Munga 57' c Ramm 68' c Seabrook 73' c Hendy 77' m Con: Smith (7/7) 3', 13', 27', 38', 42', 45', 47'; Furbank (2/2) 51', 58'; Hutchinson (2/3) 69' c, 73'	Report	Try: Davey 16' c Simpson 63' m Con: Olver (1/1) 17'; McBryde (0/1); Pen: Olver (0/1)

Franklin's Gardens, Northampton
Attendance: 9,111
Referee: Dan Jones

== Knockout stage ==
The semi-finals were confirmed on 17 October after points from the two cancelled Jersey Reds fixtures were allocated.

Semi-finals
2	Gloucester	17
3	Exeter Chiefs	14
1	Ealing Trailfinders	21
4	Leicester Tigers	29

Final
2	Gloucester	23
4	Leicester Tigers	13

=== Semi-finals ===
17 February 2024
15:05

Gloucester	17 – 14	Exeter Chiefs
Try: Ludlow 6' m Llewellyn 11' c Hathaway 31' m Con: Barton (1/3) 12'	Report	Try: Vermeulen 60' c Vintcent 67' c Con: Skinner (2/2) 61', 69'

Kingsholm
Attendance: 9,821
Referee: Christophe Ridley

Team details

FB	15	(England) Lloyd Evans
RW	14	(England) Alex Hearle
OC	13	(Wales) Max Llewellyn
IC	12	(England) Seb Atkinson (substituted off) 76'
LW	11	(Wales) Josh Hathaway
FH	10	(England) George Barton 17' to 25'
SH	9	(England) Caolan Englefield
N8	8	(England) Zach Mercer
OF	7	(England) Lewis Ludlow (C)
BF	6	(South Africa) Ruan Ackermann (substituted off) 57'
RL	5	(England) Cameron Jordan (substituted off) 72'
LL	4	(England) Freddie Clarke
TP	3	(Russia) Kirill Gotovtsev (substituted off) 67'
HK	2	(England) George McGuigan (substituted off) 40'
LP	1	(England) Jamal Ford-Robinson (substituted off) 67'
Substitutions:
HK	16	(England) Seb Blake (substituted on) 40'
PR	17	(England) Harry Elrington (substituted on) 67'
PR	18	(England) Ciaran Knight (substituted on) 67'
LK	19	(England) Arthur Clark (substituted on) 72'
BR	20	(England) Jack Clement (substituted on) 61'
SH	21	(England) Charlie Chapman
CE	22	(England) Louis Hillman-Cooper (substituted on) 76'
WG	23	(England) Jacob Morris (substituted on) 17' (substituted off) 25'
Coach:
(England) George Skivington

FB	15	(England) Josh Hodge
RW	14	(England) Ben Hammersley
OC	13	(England) Zack Wimbush
IC	12	(England) Ollie Devoto (substituted off) 59'
LW	11	(England) Arthur Relton
FH	10	(England) Harvey Skinner
SH	9	(England) Tom Cairns (substituted off) 54'
N8	8	(England) Greg Fisilau (substituted off) 58'
OF	7	(England) Richard Capstick
BF	6	(South Africa) Jacques Vermeulen
RL	5	(England) Lewis Pearson
LL	4	(England) Rus Tuima (substituted off) 58'
TP	3	(England) Ehren Painter (substituted off) 45'
HK	2	(England) Max Norey (C) (substituted off) 45'
LP	1	(Australia) Scott Sio (substituted off) 45'
Substitutions:
HK	16	(England) Jack Yeandle (substituted on) 45'
PR	17	(England) Danny Southworth (substituted on) 45'
PR	18	(New Zealand) Josh Iosefa-Scott (substituted on) 45'
LK	19	(Ireland) Jack Dunne (substituted on) 58'
FL	20	(Italy) Ross Vintcent (substituted on) 58'
SH	21	(England) Will Becconsall (substituted on) 54'
CE	22	(Wales) Iwan Jenkins
WG	23	(England) Will Rigg (substituted on) 59'
Coach:
(England) Rob Baxter & (England) Ali Hepher

Player of the Match:
(England) Zach Mercer (Gloucester)

Assistant referees:
Dan Jones
Veryan Boscawen
Television match official:
Ian Tempest

18 February 2024
15:00

Ealing Trailfinders	21 – 29	Leicester Tigers
Try: Goodrick-Clarke 57' m Willemse 72' c Con: Twelvetrees (1/2) 73'; Pen: Twelvetrees (3/4) 5', 17', 50'	Report	Try: Cokanasiga (2) 23' c, 64' c Theobald-Thomas 30 ' m Scott 78' c Con: Shillcock (3/4) 24', 65', 79'; Pen: Shillcock (1/1) 63'

Trailfinders Sports Ground
Attendance: 2,700
Referee: Adam Leal

=== Final ===
15 March 2024
19:45

Gloucester	23 – 13	Leicester Tigers
Try: Atkinson 47' c Jordan 50' c Con: Barton (2/2) 48', 51'; Pen: Barton (2/5) 55', 65'; Evans (1/1) 40+1'	Report	Try: Liebenberg 74' c Con: Pollard (1/1) 75'; Pen: Pollard (2/2) 24', 30'

Kingsholm
Attendance: 14,460
Referee: Jack Makepeace

Gloucester
Leicester

FB	15	(England) Lloyd Evans
RW	14	(England) Alex Hearle
OC	13	(Wales) Max Llewellyn
IC	12	(England) Seb Atkinson
LW	11	(England) Ollie Thorley
FH	10	(England) George Barton (substituted off) 32' (substituted on) 40'
SH	9	(England) Caolan Englefield
N8	8	(England) Zach Mercer
OF	7	(England) Lewis Ludlow (C) (substituted off) 71'
BF	6	(South Africa) Ruan Ackermann (substituted off) 71'
RL	5	(England) Cam Jordan (yellow card) 74' to end'
LL	4	(England) Freddie Clarke
TP	3	(Russia) Kirill Gotovtsev
HK	2	(England) George McGuigan (substituted off) 78'
LP	1	(England) Val Rapava-Ruskin (substituted off) 40'
Substitutions:
HK	16	(England) Seb Blake (substituted on) 78'
PR	17	(England) Harry Elrington
PR	18	(England) Jamal Ford-Robinson (substituted on) 40'
LK	19	(England) Arthur Clark (substituted on) 71'
FL	20	(England) Jack Clement (substituted on) 71'
SH	21	(England) Charlie Chapman
CE	22	(England) Louis Hillman-Cooper
WG	23	(Wales) Josh Hathaway (substituted on) 32' (substituted off) 40'
Coach:
(England) George Skivington

FB	15	(England) Mike Brown (yellow card) 46' to 56' (substituted off) 62'
RW	14	(England) Josh Bassett
OC	13	(Scotland) Matt Scott
IC	12	(England) Dan Kelly (substituted off) 56'
LW	11	(England) Ollie Hassell-Collins
FH	10	(South Africa) Handré Pollard
SH	9	(England) Tom Whiteley (substituted off) 78'
N8	8	(South Africa) Kyle Hatherell
OF	7	(England) Matt Rogerson (substituted off) 46' (substituted on) 52' (substituted off) 58'
BF	6	(South Africa) Hanro Liebenberg
RL	5	(Australia) Sam Carter
LL	4	(England) Harry Wells (substituted off) 65'
TP	3	(England) Joe Heyes (substituted off) 78'
HK	2	(England) Finn Theobald-Thomas (yellow card) 40' to 52' (substituted off) 75'
LP	1	(South Africa) Francois van Wyk (substituted off) 65'
Substitutions:
HK	16	(England) Archie Vanes (substituted on) 46' (substituted off) 52' (substituted on) 75'
PR	17	(England) James Whitcombe (substituted on) 65'
PR	18	(England) Dan Richardson (substituted on) 78'
LK	19	(Wales) Olly Cracknell (substituted on) 58'
FL	20	(England) Emeka Ilione (substituted on) 65'
SH	21	(England) Sam Edwards (substituted on) 78'
CE	22	(England) Jamie Shillcock (substituted on) 62'
WG	23	(England) Phil Cokanasiga (substituted on) 56'
Coach:
(Australia) Dan McKellar

Player of the Match:
Cam Jordan (Gloucester)

Assistant referees:
Harry Walbaum
John Meredith
Television match official:
Dan Jones

Notes:

- Gloucester became the first club to win all three iterations of the English domestic cup competition having won both the RFU Knockout Cup and the Anglo-Welsh Cup previously.

== Attendances ==
Club	Home matches	Total	Average	Highest	Lowest	% Capacity
Ampthill	2	2,731	1,366	1,734	997	46%
Bath	3	24,142	8,047	9,426	7,285	55%
Bedford Blues	2	5,860	2,930	3,707	2,153	59%
Bristol Bears	3	32,654	10,885	11,356	10,136	40%
Caldy	2	4,187	2,094	2,687	1,500	52%
Cambridge	2	2,025	1,013	1,027	998	46%
Cornish Pirates	1 (Note: Cornish Pirates only played one home game as their fixture versus Jersey Reds on 29 September 2023 was cancelled.)	2,891	2,891	2,891	2,891	72%
Coventry	2	6,231	3,116	4,109	2,122	60%
Doncaster Knights	2	3,331	1,666	2,175	1,156	32%
Ealing Trailfinders	3	4,807	1,602	2,700	590	32%
Exeter Chiefs	3	23,306	7,769	8,328	6,906	50%
Gloucester	5	45,462	9,092	14,460	4,124	56%
Harlequins	3	16,149	5,383	7,735	3,783	36%
Hartpury	2	2,592	1,296	2,042	550	65%
Jersey Reds	1 (Note: Jersey Reds only played one home game before going into liquidation.)	1,826	1,826	1,826	1,826	46%
Leicester Tigers	3	20,133	6,711	8,000	5,600	26%
London Scottish	3	1,432	477	661	384	11%
Newcastle Falcons	3	9,680	3,227	3,751	2,812	32%
Northampton Saints	3	24,653	8,218	10,356	5,186	63%
Nottingham	2	3,260	1,630	2,402	858	47%
Sale Sharks	3	7,732	2,577	4,000	411	21%
Saracens	3	7,946	2,649	2,904	2,146	25%

== Individual statistics ==
=== Top points scorers ===
Rank	Player	Team	Points
1	(England) George Barton	Gloucester	46
2	(England) Jack Clement	Gloucester	40
2	(Wales) Steven Shingler	Ealing Trailfinders	40
3	(England) Manu Vunipola	Saracens	39
4	(England) Jamie Shillcock	Leicester Tigers	38
5	(Italy) Ross Vintcent	Exeter Chiefs	35

=== Top try scorers ===
Rank	Player	Team	Tries
1	(England) Jack Clement	Gloucester	8
2	(Italy) Ross Vintcent	Exeter Chiefs	7
3	(England) Sam Dugdale	Sale Sharks	5
3	(England) Tommy Freeman	Northampton Saints	5
3	(England) Tom de Glanville	Bath	5
3	(England) Ryan Hutler	Coventry	5
3	(England) Toby Knight	Saracens	5
3	(England) William Trewin	Cornish Pirates	5

== Broadcasting ==
One game from each round will be broadcast on TNT Sports as well as both the semifinals and the final.

== See also ==
- 2023–24 Premiership Rugby
- 2023–24 RFU Championship
