= 2023–24 EPCR Challenge Cup =

Rugby union competition

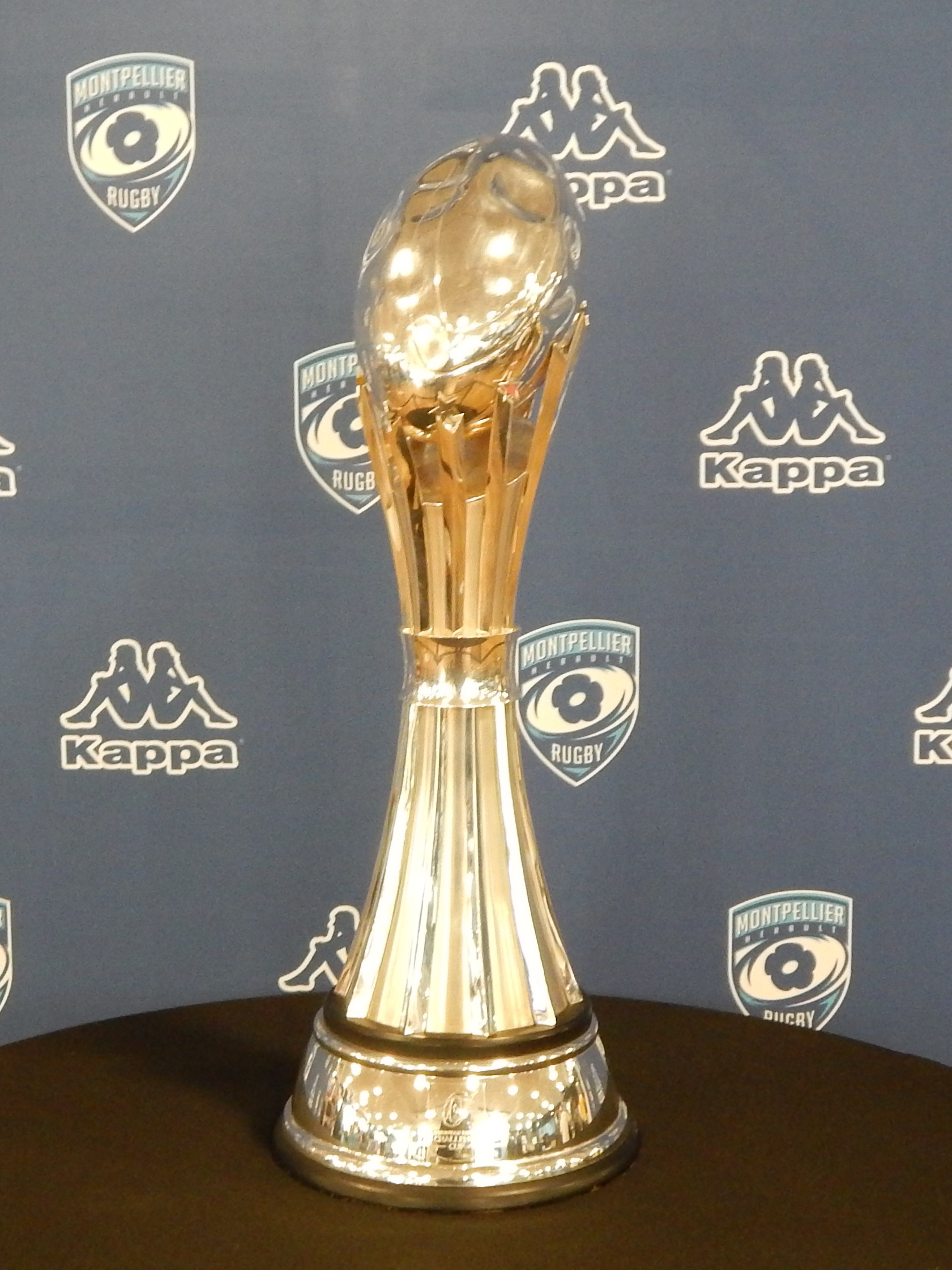
- The EPCR Challenge Cup

Tournament details
- Countries: England; France; Georgia; Ireland; Italy; Scotland; South Africa; Wales
- Tournament format(s): Round-robin and knockout
- Date: 8 December 2023 – 24 May 2024

Tournament statistics
- Teams: 18 (pool stage) + 4 (joining in knockout stage)
- Matches played: 51
- Attendance: 384,554 (7,540 per match)
- Highest attendance: 34,761 – Sharks v Gloucester; 24 May 2024
- Lowest attendance: 1,600 – Zebre Parma v Cheetahs; 9 December 2023
- Tries scored: 294 (5.76 per match)
- Top point scorer(s): (France) Anthony Belleau (Clermont); 81 points
- Top try scorer(s): (Fiji) Onisi Ratave (Benetton) (South Africa) Makazole Mapimpi (Sharks); 6 tries

Final
- Venue: Tottenham Hotspur Stadium, London
- Champions: (South Africa) Sharks (1st title)
- Runners-up: (England) Gloucester

The 2023–24 EPCR Challenge Cup was the 10th edition of the EPCR Challenge Cup, an annual second-tier rugby union competition for professional clubs. Including the predecessor competition, the original European Challenge Cup, this is the 28th edition of European club rugby's second-tier competition.

The tournament commenced in December 2023, and concluded with the final on 24 May 2024 at Tottenham Hotspur Stadium, London, England. In the final, Sharks beat Gloucester to win the cup for the first time.

This is the second year that teams from South Africa can qualify, following the second United Rugby Championship season. Two teams have been invited from outside the three main European professional leagues; The Black Lion from Tbilisi, Georgia are current holders of the Rugby Europe Super Cup, the third-tier competition in European rugby administered by Rugby Europe, and Cheetahs the current holders of the Currie Cup, South Africa's second tier and most historic national competition. Originally not represented in the Challenge Cup, two Irish teams, Ulster and Connacht, joined in the play-off rounds, having dropped down from the Champions Cup.

== Teams ==
Location of European teams 2023–24 EPCR Challenge Cup (Europe)	Location of South African teams 2023–24 EPCR Challenge Cup (South Africa)
Locations of teams of the 2023–24 EPCR Challenge Cup. Blue: Pool 1; Red: Pool 2; Green: Pool 3; Yellow italic: Entered competition in knockout stage. Both home venues used by Cheetahs are marked.

Sixteen teams qualified for the 2023–24 EPCR Challenge Cup from Premiership Rugby, the Top 14 and the United Rugby Championship as a direct result of their domestic league performance having not qualified for the Heineken Champions Cup. Plus two invited sides making 18 teams.

The distribution of teams are:

- England: two teams
  - Remaining teams in the 2023–24 Premiership Season that do not qualify for the 2023–24 European Rugby Champions Cup. Bristol Bears had previously qualified but replaced London Irish in the 2023–24 European Rugby Champions Cup following London Irish's suspension from the Premiership
- France: six teams
  - Teams taking part in the 2023–24 Top 14 season that did not qualify for the Champions Cup
- Georgia, Italy, Scotland, Wales, South Africa: ten teams
  - Eight teams qualified from Italy, Scotland, Wales and South Africa through the United Rugby Championship. Ireland are not represented.
  - Two teams invited, one each from South Africa and Georgia.

Entry Point	Premiership	Top 14	United Rugby Championship					Invited	
—N/a	England	France	Ireland	Italy	Scotland	Wales	South Africa		(Georgia (country)) Georgia
Pool stage	Gloucester; Newcastle Falcons	Castres; Clermont; Montpellier; Pau; Perpignan; Oyonnax	—N/a	Benetton; Zebre Parma	Edinburgh	Ospreys; Scarlets; Dragons	Sharks; Lions	Cheetahs	Black Lion
Knockout stage	Sale Sharks	Bayonne	Ulster; Connacht	—N/a	—N/a	—N/a	—N/a	—N/a	—N/a

=== Team details ===
Team	Coach / Director of Rugby	Captain	Stadium	Capacity	Method of qualification
Entering at Pool stage
(Italy) Benetton	(Italy) Marco Bortolami	(South Africa) Dewaldt Duvenage (Italy) Michele Lamaro	Stadio Comunale di Monigo	5,000	URC bottom eight
(Georgia (country)) Black Lion	(Georgia (country)) Levan Maisashvili	(Georgia (country)) Merab Sharikadze	Mikheil Meskhi Stadium	27,223	Invited (Note: Black Lion are champions of the third-tier Rugby Europe Super Cup competition for European nations outside the Six Nations.)
(France) Castres	(Ireland) Jeremy Davidson	(France) Mathieu Babillot	Stade Pierre-Fabre	12,500	Top 14 bottom 6
(South Africa) Cheetahs	(South Africa) Hawies Fourie	(South Africa) Victor Sekekete	Free State Stadium, South Africa	46,000	Invited (Note: Cheetahs formerly competed in the Pro 12, the earlier incarnation of the United Rugby Championship.)
(South Africa) Cheetahs	(South Africa) Hawies Fourie	(South Africa) Victor Sekekete	NRCA Stadium, Netherlands	5,000	Invited
(France) Clermont	(France) Christophe Urios	(France) Arthur Iturria	Stade Marcel-Michelin	19,022	Top 14 bottom 6
(Wales) Dragons	(Wales) Dai Flanagan	(Wales) Steffan Hughes	Rodney Parade	8,700	URC bottom eight
(Scotland) Edinburgh	(South Africa) Sean Everitt	(Scotland) Grant Gilchrist (Scotland) Jamie Ritchie	Edinburgh Rugby Stadium	7,800	URC bottom eight
(England) Gloucester	(England) George Skivington	(England) Lewis Ludlow	Kingsholm	16,115	Premiership bottom 2
(South Africa) Lions	(South Africa) Ivan van Rooyen	(South Africa) Marius Louw	Emirates Airline Park	62,567	URC bottom eight
(France) Montpellier	(England) Richard Cockerill (Note: Richard Cockerill was sacked in November 2023 after a poor start to the season and replaced by Patrice Collazo.) (France) Patrice Collazo	(France) Paul Willemse	GGL Stadium	15,697	Top 14 bottom 6
(England) Newcastle Falcons	(England) Alex Codling (Note: Alex Codling stepped down from his daily duties as Newcastle Falcons head coach at the start of February 2024. Forwards coach Micky Ward took over on an interim basis.) (England) Micky Ward (interim)	(England) Callum Chick	Kingston Park	11,200	Premiership bottom 2
(Wales) Ospreys	(England) Toby Booth	(Wales) Justin Tipuric	Swansea.com Stadium	22,200	URC bottom eight
(France) Oyonnax	(England) Joe El Abd	(France) Tommy Raynaud	Stade Charles-Mathon	11,500	Pro D2 Champions
(France) Pau	(France) Sébastien Piqueronies	(Georgia (country)) Beka Gorgadze	Stade du Hameau	18,324	Top 14 bottom 6
(France) Perpignan	(France) Franck Azéma	(France) Mathieu Acebes	Stade Aimé Giral	14,593	Top 14 bottom 6
(Wales) Scarlets	(Wales) Dwayne Peel	(Wales) Josh Macleod	Parc y Scarlets	14,870	URC bottom eight
(South Africa) Sharks	(New Zealand) John Plumtree	(South Africa) Lukhanyo Am	Hollywoodbets Kings Park Stadium	54,000	URC bottom eight (Note: Sharks finished eighth in the URC regular season phase, but were displaced in the Champions Cup by Cardiff Rugby as URC Welsh Shield winners)
(Italy) Zebre Parma	(Italy) Fabio Roselli	(Italy) Dave Sisi	Stadio Sergio Lanfranchi	5,000	URC bottom eight
Entering at Knockout Stage (transferred from Champions Cup)
(France) Bayonne	(France) Grégory Patat	(France) Denis Marchois	Stade Jean-Dauger	14,370	Champions Cup Pool C 5th place
(Ireland) Connacht	(England) Peter Wilkins	(Ireland) Jack Carty	Galway Sportsgrounds	8,129	Champions Cup Pool A 5th place
(England) Sale Sharks	(England) Alex Sanderson	(England) Ben Curry	Salford Community Stadium	12,000	Champions Cup Pool D 5th place
(Ireland) Ulster	(Ireland) Richie Murphy	(Ireland) Iain Henderson	Ravenhill Stadium	18,196	Champions Cup Pool B 5th place

== Pool stage ==
Teams were awarded four points for a win, two for a draw, one for scoring four tries in a game, and one for losing by less than eight points.

=== Pool 1 ===
2023–24 EPCR Challenge Cup Pool 1
Pos	Team	Pld	W	D	L	PF	PA	PD	TF	TA	TB	LB	Pts	Qualification
1	(South Africa) Sharks (1)	4	3	0	1	141	53	+88	21	6	4	1	17	Qualifies for a home Round of 16
2	(France) Pau (6)	4	3	0	1	90	113	−23	10	15	0	0	12	Qualifies for a home Round of 16
3	(South Africa) Cheetahs (13)	4	2	0	2	112	105	+7	14	13	2	1	11	Qualifies for Round of 16
4	(Italy) Zebre Parma (16)	4	2	0	2	83	92	−9	11	9	1	1	10	Qualifies for Round of 16
5	(Wales) Dragons	4	1	0	3	71	80	−9	7	12	1	2	7	
6	(France) Oyonnax	4	1	0	3	56	110	−54	8	16	1	1	6	

Source: EPCR

=== Pool 2 ===
2023–24 EPCR Challenge Cup Pool 2
Pos	Team	Pld	W	D	L	PF	PA	PD	TF	TA	TB	LB	Pts	Qualification
1	(Italy) Benetton Rugby (3)	4	3	0	1	147	87	+60	19	12	3	0	15	Qualifies for a home Round of 16
2	(France) Montpellier (5)	4	3	0	1	94	54	+40	15	7	2	0	14	Qualifies for a home Round of 16
3	(Wales) Ospreys (7)	4	3	0	1	111	103	+8	15	14	2	0	14	Qualifies for a home Round of 16 as 3rd best
4	(South Africa) Lions (14)	4	2	0	2	94	76	+18	10	8	2	0	10	Qualifies for Round of 16
5	(England) Newcastle Falcons	4	1	0	3	82	139	−57	8	20	0	1	5	
6	(France) Perpignan	4	0	0	4	45	114	−69	4	10	0	0	0	

Source: EPCR

=== Pool 3 ===
2023–24 EPCR Challenge Cup Pool 3
Pos	Team	Pld	W	D	L	PF	PA	PD	TF	TA	TB	LB	Pts	Qualification
1	(England) Gloucester (2)	4	4	0	0	99	52	+47	9	7	1	0	17	Qualifies for a home Round of 16
2	(France) Clermont (4)	4	3	0	1	122	66	+56	17	7	3	0	15	Qualifies for a home Round of 16
3	(Scotland) Edinburgh (8)	4	2	0	2	103	92	+11	15	12	2	1	11	Qualifies for a home Round of 16 as second 3rd best
4	(France) Castres (15)	4	2	0	2	88	91	−3	13	10	2	0	10	Qualifies for Round of 16
5	(Georgia (country)) Black Lion	4	1	0	3	42	86	−44	3	10	0	1	5	
6	(Wales) Scarlets	4	0	0	4	59	126	−67	7	18	0	0	0	

Source: EPCR

== Knockout stage ==
The knockout stage was played with a single-leg round of 16 matches consisting of the top four teams from each pool and the teams ranked 5th in each pool of the 2023–24 European Rugby Champions Cup. The Round of 16 followed a pre-determined format, while the quarter-finals and semi-finals guaranteed home advantage to the higher-ranked team.

=== Seeding ===
Rank	Team	Pts	Diff	TF
Pool leaders
1	(South Africa) Sharks	17	+88	21
2	(England) Gloucester	17	+47	9
3	(Italy) Benetton Rugby	15	+60	19
Pool runners-up
4	(France) Clermont	15	+56	17
5	(France) Montpellier	14	+40	15
6	(France) Pau	12	–23	10
Top two third placed teams
7	(Wales) Ospreys	14	+8	15
8	(Scotland) Edinburgh	11	+11	15
Champions Cup teams
9	(France) Bayonne	8	–25	11
10	(England) Sale Sharks	6	–7	13
11	(Ireland) Connacht	6	–52	13
12	(Ireland) Ulster	5	–59	12
Third best third placed team
13	(South Africa) Cheetahs	11	+7	14
Fourth placed teams
14	(South Africa) Lions	10	+18	10
15	(France) Castres	10	–3	13
16	(Italy) Zebre Parma	10	–9	11

=== Bracket ===
Round of 16
1	(South Africa) Sharks	47
16	(Italy) Zebre Parma	3
8	(Scotland) Edinburgh	33
9	(France) Bayonne	15
4	(France) Clermont	27
13	(South Africa) Cheetahs	22
5	(France) Montpellier	17
12	(Ireland) Ulster	40
2	(England) Gloucester	30
15	(France) Castres	25
7	(Wales) Ospreys	23
10	(England) Sale Sharks	15
3	(Italy) Benetton	27
14	(South Africa) Lions	17
6	(France) Pau	30
11	(Ireland) Connacht	40

Quarter-finals
1	(South Africa) Sharks	36
8	(Scotland) Edinburgh	30
4	(France) Clermont	53
12	(Ireland) Ulster	14
2	(England) Gloucester	23
7	(Wales) Ospreys	13
3	(Italy) Benetton	39
11	(Ireland) Connacht	24

Semi-finals
1	(South Africa) Sharks	32
4	(France) Clermont	31
2	(England) Gloucester	40
3	(Italy) Benetton	23

Final
1	(South Africa) Sharks	36
2	(England) Gloucester	22

=== Round of 16 ===
5 April 2024
20:00

Gloucester (England) (2)	30–25	(15) (France) Castres
Try: Mercer 8' c May 27' c Llewellyn 31' c Con: Carreras (3/3) 10', 28', 33'; Pen: Carreras (3/3) 55', 61', 79'	Report	Try: Dumora 1' c Zarantonello 72' c Raisuqe 80+2' m Con: Popelin (2/3) 2', 73'; Pen: Popelin (2/2) 39', 52'

Kingsholm, Gloucester
Attendance: 9,134
Referee: Andrew Brace (Ireland)

6 April 2024
12:30

Clermont (France) (4)	27–22	(13) (South Africa) Cheetahs
Try: Jurand 1' c Delguy 37' m Fourcade 41' c Jauneau 53' m Con: Belleau (2/4) 2', 42'; Pen: Belleau (1/2) 22'	Report	Try: Qoma (2) 62' c, 72' c Mafura 68' m Con: Pienaar (2/3) 63', 73'; Pen: Pienaar (1/1) 11'

Stade Marcel-Michelin, Clermont-Ferrand
Attendance: 13,493
Referee: Sam Grove-White (Scotland)

6 April 2024
17:30

Benetton (Italy) (3)	27–17	(14) (South Africa) Lions
Try: Gallo 8' c Ratave 33' c Bernasconi 51' c Con: Umaga (3/3) 9', 34', 52'; Pen: Albornoz (1/1) 63'	Report	Try: Visagie 2' c Hendrikse 46' c Con: Hendrikse (2/2) 3', 47'; Pen: Hendrikse (1/3) 37'

Stadio Comunale di Monigo, Treviso
Attendance: 4,846
Referee: Christophe Ridley (England)

6 April 2024
20:00

Ospreys (Wales) (7)	23–15	(10) (England) Sale Sharks
Try: Morris 32' m Giles 46' m Morgan-Williams 48' c Con: O. Williams (1/3) 49'; Pen: O. Williams (2/4) 25', 78'	Report	Try: Reed 61' m B. Curry 69' c Con: R. du Preez (1/2) 69'; Pen: R. du Preez (1/1) 3'

Brewery Field, Bridgend
Attendance: 4,225
Referee: Mathieu Raynal (France)

6 April 2024
20:00

Edinburgh (Scotland) (8)	33–15	(9) (France) Bayonne
Try: Watson 23' m Currie 42' c Vellacott (2) 53' c, 56' c Van der Merwe 67' c Con: Healy (4/5) 42', 54', 57', 69'	Report	Try: Spring (2) 17' c, 49' m Con: Spring (1/2) 18'; Pen: Spring (1/1) 48'

Murrayfield, Edinburgh (Note: Edinburgh's game against Bayonne was originally scheduled to be held at the Edinburgh Rugby Stadium but was moved the day of the game to Murrayfield Stadium due to strong winds from Storm Kathleen.)
Attendance: 5,365
Referee: Chris Busby (Ireland)

7 April 2024
12:30

Montpellier (France) (5)	17–40	(12) (Ireland) Ulster
Try: Willemse 9' c Eymeri 23' c Con: Foursans-Bourdette (2/2) 10', 24'; Pen: Foursans-Bourdette (1/1) 38'	Report	Try: Addison 27' c Baloucoune 42' m Wilson 62' c McCann 67' c McCloskey 77' c Penalty try 80'; Con: Cooney (4/5) 30', 63', 68', 79'

GGL Stadium, Montpellier
Attendance: 5,240
Referee: Ben Whitehouse (Wales)

7 April 2024
15:00

Sharks (South Africa) (1)	47–3	(16) (Italy) Zebre Parma
Try: Tshituka 6' c Kok 20' c Rahl 35' c Fassi 43' c Buthelezi 56' m Hooker 64' c Bosch 74' c Con: Masuku (5/6) 7', 21', 36', 44', 65'; Bosch (1/1) 75'	Report	Pen: Eden (1/1) 5'

Kings Park Stadium, Durban
Attendance: 6,730
Referee: Anthony Woodthorpe (England)

7 April 2024
17:30

Pau (France) (6)	30–40	(11) (Ireland) Connacht
Try: Zegueur (2) 9' c, 38' c Fisi'ihoi 46' c Con: Simmonds (3/3) 9', 39', 47'; Pen: Simmonds (2/2) 25', 36'	Report	Try: Heffernan 4' c Prendergast (2) 14' m, 78' c Bolton 44' c Blade 54' c Aki 64' c Con: Carty (2/3) 6', 45'; Hanrahan (3/3) 55', 65', 80'

Stade du Hameau, Pau
Attendance: 6,488
Referee: Andrea Piardi (Italy)

=== Quarter-finals ===
12 April 2024
20:00

Gloucester (England) (2)	23–13	(7) (Wales) Ospreys
Try: Blake 30' m Pen: Carreras (6/6) 6', 18', 34', 50', 60', 65'	Report	Try: Giles 13' c Con: O. Williams (1/1) 14'; Pen: O. Williams (1/2) 22'; Giles (1/1) 40'

Kingsholm, Gloucester
Attendance: 9,816
Referee: Pierre Brousset (France)

13 April 2024
13:30

Sharks (South Africa) (1)	36–30	(8) (Scotland) Edinburgh
Try: Am 16' c J. Venter 26' c Mbonambi 55' c Con: Makusu (3/3) 17', 27', 56'; Pen: Makusu (4/5) 48', 52', 65', 70'; Bosch (1/1) 78'	Report	Try: Schoeman 31' c Watson 75' c Cherry 80+2' c Con: Healy (3/3) 32', 76', 80+3'; Pen: Healy (3/3) 3', 15', 40'

Kings Park Stadium, Durban
Attendance: 11,894
Referee: Matthew Carley (England)

13 April 2024
13:30

Clermont (France) (4)	53–14	(12) (Ireland) Ulster
Try: Yato (2) 18' c, 68' c Sowakula (2) 36' c, 59' c Newsome 44' c Simmons 63' c Jurand 79' m Con: Belleau (4/4) 19', 37', 61', 64'; Delguy (1/1) 45'; Bézy (1/2) 69'; Pen: Belleau (2/3) 28', 32'	Report	Try: Timoney (2) 12' c, 43' c Con: Cooney (2/2) 13', 45'

Stade Marcel-Michelin, Clermont-Ferrand
Attendance: 13,945
Referee: Christophe Ridley (England)

14 April 2024
13:30

Benetton (Italy) (3)	39–24	(11) (Ireland) Connacht
Try: Lucchesi 5' c Menoncello 12' c, 59' c Smith 19' c Albornoz (2) 26' 66'; Con: Albornoz (1/1) 6'; Umaga (3/3) 20', 28', 67'; Pen: Umaga 53', 60'	Report	Try: Heffernan 2' c Boyle 41' c Aki 56' c Smith 68'; Con: Hanrahan (2/4) 3', 42'

Stadio Comunale di Monigo, Treviso
Attendance: 4,098
Referee: Mike Adamson (Scotland)

=== Semi-finals ===
4 May 2024
12:30

Sharks (South Africa) (1)	32–31	(4) (France) Clermont
Try: Koch 60' c Mapimpi 70' c Con: Masuku (2/2) 61', 71'; Pen: Masuku (6/6) 3', 8', 13', 18', 25', 28'	Report	Try: Jurand (2) 4' c, 19' m Newsome 29' c Con: Belleau (2/3) 6', 31'; Pen: Belleau (4/5) 15', 36', 40+1', 41'

Twickenham Stoop, London
Attendance: 5,517
Referee: Luke Pearce (England)

4 May 2024
15:00

Gloucester (England) (2)	40–23	(3) (Italy) Benetton
Try: Hathaway 5' m Blake 28' c Hastings 57' c Clarke 61' c Thorley 77' m Con: Hastings (3/5) 29', 59', 62'; Pen: Hastings (2/3) 19', 48'; Englefield (1/1) 69'	Report	Try: Smith 41' m Lucchesi (2) 54' m, 66' c Con: Albornoz (1/3) 67'; Pen: Albornoz (2/2) 15', 23'

Kingsholm, Gloucester
Attendance: 11,426
Referee: Nika Amashukeli (Georgia)

=== Final ===
24 May 2024
20:00

Sharks (South Africa) (1)	36–22	(2) (England) Gloucester
Try: Buthelezi 25' c Fassi 54' c Mapimpi 59' c Con: Masuku (3/3) 26', 55', 60'; Pen: Masuku (5/6) 14', 30', 36', 49', 52'	Report	Try: Tuisue 57' c Socino 75' c Clarke 78' m Con: Hastings (2/3) 58', 76'; Pen: Englefield (1/1) 22'

Tottenham Hotspur Stadium, London
Attendance: 34,761
Referee: Mathieu Raynal (France)

Team details

		Sharks
FB	15	(South Africa) Aphelele Fassi	(yellow card) 6'	(substituted off) 74'
RW	14	(South Africa) Werner Kok
OC	13	(South Africa) Ethan Hooker
IC	12	(South Africa) Francois Venter
LW	11	(South Africa) Makazole Mapimpi
FH	10	(South Africa) Siya Masuku
SH	9	(South Africa) Grant Williams		(substituted off) 71'
N8	8	(South Africa) Phepsi Buthelezi
OF	7	(Democratic Republic of the Congo) Vincent Tshituka
BF	6	(South Africa) James Venter		(substituted off) 76'
RL	5	(South Africa) Gerbrandt Grobler		(substituted off) 76'
LL	4	(South Africa) Eben Etzebeth (c)
TP	3	(South Africa) Vincent Koch		(substituted off) 69'
HK	2	(South Africa) Bongi Mbonambi		(substituted off) 69'
LP	1	(South Africa) Ox Nché		(substituted off) 69'
Substitutions:
HK	16	(South Africa) Fez Mbatha		(substituted on) 69'
PR	17	(South Africa) Ntuthuko Mchunu		(substituted on) 69'
PR	18	(South Africa) Hanro Jacobs		(substituted on) 69'
LK	19	(South Africa) Jeandre Labuschagne		(substituted on) 76'
BR	20	(Scotland) Dylan Richardson		(substituted on) 76'
SH	21	(South Africa) Cameron Wright		(substituted on) 71'
FH	22	(South Africa) Curwin Bosch		(substituted on) 74'
WG	23	(South Africa) Eduan Keyter
Coach:
(New Zealand) John Plumtree

		Gloucester
FB	15	(Argentina) Santiago Carreras
RW	14	(England) Jonny May	(substituted off) 76'
OC	13	(Scotland) Chris Harris
IC	12	(England) Seb Atkinson	(substituted off) 56'
LW	11	(England) Ollie Thorley
FH	10	(Scotland) Adam Hastings
SH	9	(England) Caolan Englefield	(substituted off) 56'
N8	8	(England) Zach Mercer
OF	7	(England) Lewis Ludlow (c)
BF	6	(South Africa) Ruan Ackermann	(substituted off) 64'
RL	5	(England) Arthur Clark	(substituted off) 56'
LL	4	(England) Freddie Clarke
TP	3	(England) Fraser Balmain	(substituted off) 40'
HK	2	(England) Seb Blake	(substituted off) 40'
LP	1	(England) Jamal Ford-Robinson	(substituted off) 40'
Substitutions:
HK	16	(Argentina) Santiago Socino	(substituted on) 40'
PR	17	(Argentina) Mayco Vivas	(substituted on) 40'
PR	18	(Russia) Kirill Gotovtsev	(substituted on) 40'
LK	19	(Fiji) Albert Tuisue	(substituted on) 56'
BR	20	(England) Jack Clement	(substituted on) 64'
SH	21	(Italy) Stephen Varney	(substituted on) 56'
CE	22	(Wales) Max Llewellyn	(substituted on) 56'
FB	23	(England) Josh Hathaway	(substituted on) 76'
Coach:
(England) George Skivington

Player of the Match:
(South Africa) Vincent Koch (Sharks)
Assistant referees:
Andrew Brace (Ireland)
Pierre Brousset (France)
Television Match Official:
Eric Gauzins (France)

== See also ==
- 2023–24 European Rugby Champions Cup
- 2023 Rugby Europe Super Cup
