= 2023–24 RFU Championship =

Rugby union competition in England

- Countries: England
- Date: 20 October 2023 — 25 May 2024
- Champions: Ealing Trailfinders (2nd title)
- Matches played: 110
- Attendance: 175,342 (average 1,594 per match)
- Highest attendance: 5,047 – Coventry v Nottingham, 26 December 2023
- Lowest attendance: 481 – London Scottish v Doncaster Knights, 9 March 2024
- Tries scored: 895 (average 8.1 per match)
- Top point scorer: 184 – Patrick Pellegrini, Coventry
- Top try scorer: 16 – Matt Cornish, Ealing Trailfinders

The 2023–24 RFU Championship is the fifteenth season of the RFU Championship, the professional second tier of rugby union in England. It features eleven English teams, with the 12th team, and reigning champions, Jersey Reds, withdrawing from the competition at the start of the season after going into liquidation.

Ealing Trailfinders were crowned champions on 11 May 2024 with a game still to play, despite losing away to Doncaster Knights, thanks to Cornish Pirates defeating Coventry on the same day. It would be Ealing's second Championship title in three years, but once again they would be denied promotion to the Premiership due to the minimum standard criteria. No teams would be relegated this season due to Jersey's liquidation.

== Structure ==
The eleven teams will play each of the other teams twice.

The results of the matches contribute points to the league as follows:

- 4 points are awarded for a win
- 2 points are awarded for a draw
- 0 points are awarded for a loss, however
- 1 losing (bonus) point is awarded to a team that loses a match by 7 points or fewer
- 1 additional (bonus) point is awarded to a team scoring 4 tries or more in a match.

=== Promotion and relegation ===
Subject to meeting the minimum standards criteria the team finishing top of the league will qualify for a promotion playoff against the bottom side in Premiership Rugby. Due to Jersey Reds dropping out of the league, and there being only eleven teams, there will be no relegation to National League 1, although the champions of National League will be promoted to become the twelfth team for the 2024–25 season.

== Teams ==
Locations of the 2023–24 RFU Championship teams

Ten of the eleven teams played in last season's competition. Cambridge were promoted into the division as the champions of 2022–23 National League 1, replacing bottom placed Richmond who dropped down to the 2023–24 National League 1.

Club	Stadium	Capacity	Area	Previous season
Ampthill	Dillingham Park	3,000	Ampthill, Bedfordshire	8th
Bedford Blues	Goldington Road	5,000 (1,700 seats)	Bedford, Bedfordshire	4th
Caldy	Paton Field	4,000	Thurstaston, Wirral, Merseyside	10th
Cambridge	Grantchester Road	2,200 (200 seats)	Cambridge, Cambridgeshire	Promoted from National League 1
Cornish Pirates	Mennaye Field	4,000 (2,200 seats)	Penzance, Cornwall	5th
Coventry	Butts Park Arena	5,200 (3,000 seats)	Coventry, West Midlands	3rd
Doncaster Knights	Castle Park	5,183 (1,926 seats)	Doncaster, South Yorkshire	6th
Ealing Trailfinders	Trailfinders Sports Ground	5,000 (2,115 seats)	West Ealing, London	2nd
Hartpury University	ALPAS Arena	2,000	Hartpury, Gloucestershire	7th
London Scottish	Athletic Ground	4,500 (1,000 seats)	Richmond, London	11th
Nottingham	Lady Bay Sports Ground	3,500	Nottingham, Nottinghamshire	9th

== Table ==
2023–24 RFU Championship table
Pos	Team	Pld	W	D	L	PF	PA	PD	TB	LB	Pts
1	Ealing Trailfinders (C)	20	16	0	4	823	417	+406	16	2	82
2	Cornish Pirates	20	15	1	4	589	408	+181	12	1	75
3	Coventry	20	14	0	6	698	428	+270	15	2	73
4	Bedford Blues	20	12	0	8	590	563	+27	13	4	65
5	Hartpury University	20	11	0	9	627	551	+76	11	4	59
6	Doncaster Knights	20	11	1	8	509	529	−20	9	2	57
7	Ampthill	20	10	0	10	573	607	−34	14	2	56
8	Nottingham	20	8	0	12	487	615	−128	13	2	47
9	London Scottish	20	4	1	15	510	614	−104	10	7	35
10	Caldy	20	5	1	14	415	675	−260	8	1	31
11	Cambridge	20	2	0	18	382	796	−414	7	5	20

Updated to match(es) played on 25 May 2024. Source: "The Championship". England Rugby.
Rules for classification: If teams are level at any stage, tiebreakers are applied in the following order:
1. Number of matches won
2. Difference between points for and against
3. Total number of points for
4. Aggregate number of points scored in matches between tied teams
5. Number of matches won excluding the first match, then the second and so on until the tie is settled
There is no relegation this season
(C) Champions (ineligible for Promotion play-off)

== Fixtures & results ==
Fixtures for the season was announced by the RFU on 29 June 2023.

=== Round 1 ===
20 October 2023
19:30

Cornish Pirates	21 – 0	London Scottish

Mennaye Field
Attendance: 1,143
Referee: George Selwood

21 October 2023
14:00

(1 BP) Ampthill	28 – 26	Cambridge (2 BP)

Dillingham Park
Attendance: 708
Referee: Dan Rhys Jones

21 October 2023
14:30

Doncaster Knights	20 – 18	Hartpury University (1 BP)

Castle Park
Attendance: 2,056
Referee: Hamish Grant

21 October 2023
15:00

Bedford Blues	21 – 41	Ealing Trailfinders (1 BP)

Goldington Road
Attendance: 2,380
Referee: Mike Hudson

21 October 2023
15:00

(1 BP) Caldy	31 – 41	Nottingham (1 BP)

Paton Field
Attendance: 1,278
Referee: Joe James

Bye/s: Coventry

=== Round 2 ===
28 October 2023
14:30

(1 BP) Cornish Pirates	18 – 20	Bedford Blues

Mennaye Fields
Attendance: 1,414
Referee: Jonathan Cook

28 October 2023
14:30

Hartpury University	28 – 36	Ealing Trailfinders (1 BP)

ALPAS Arena
Attendance: 486
Referee: Richard Gordon

28 October 2023
15:00

Cambridge	14 – 61	Doncaster Knights (1 BP)

Grantchester Road
Attendance: 1,308
Referee: Alexander Thomas

28 October 2023
15:00

(1 BP) Nottingham	41 – 28	Ampthill (1 BP)

Lady Bay Sports Ground
Attendance: 979
Referee: Andrew Wigley

28 October 2023
16:00

(1 BP) Coventry	45 – 5	Caldy

Butts Park Arena
Attendance: 2,611
Referee: Harry Walbaum

Bye/s: London Scottish

=== Round 3 ===
4 November 2023
14:00

(1 BP) Ampthill	34 – 24	Coventry (1 BP)

Dillingham Park
Attendance: 757
Referee: Andrew Wigley

4 November 2023
14:00

(1 BP) Caldy	29 – 19	London Scottish

Paton Field
Attendance: 1,258
Referee: Michael Hudson

4 November 2023
14:00

(1 BP) Ealing Trailfinders	64 – 7	Cambridge

Trailfinders Sports Ground
Attendance: 811
Referee: Jonathan Cook

4 November 2023
14:30

(1 BP) Doncaster Knights	30 – 19	Nottingham

Castle Park
Attendance: 1,872
Referee: Simon Harding

11 November 2023
15:00

(1 BP) Bedford Blues	53 – 12	Hartpury University

Goldington Road
Attendance: 2,414
Referee: Alex Thomas

Bye/s: Cornish Pirates

=== Round 4 ===
17 November 2023
19:45

London Scottish	10 – 36	Ampthill (1 BP)

Athletic Ground
Attendance: 763
Referee: Jonathan Cook

17 November 2023
19:45

(1 BP) Nottingham	26 – 38	Ealing Trailfinders (1 BP)

Lady Bay Sports Ground
Attendance: 1,208
Referee: Andrew Jackson

18 November 2023
14:00

(1 BP) Cambridge	22 – 40	Hartpury University (1 BP)

Grantchester Road
Attendance: 1,085
Referee: Hamish Grant

18 November 2023
14:30

(1 BP) Cornish Pirates	49 – 22	Caldy

Mennaye Fields
Attendance: 1,454
Referee: George Selwood

18 November 2023
15:00

(1 BP) Coventry	51 – 7	Doncaster Knights

Butts Park Arena
Attendance: 3,417
Referee: Sara Cox

Bye/s: Bedford Blues

=== Round 5 ===
24 November 2023
19:45

Hartpury University	20 – 32	Nottingham (1 BP)

ALPAS Arena
Attendance: 745
Referee: Mike Hudson

25 November 2023
14:00

Ampthill	24 – 46	Cornish Pirates (1 BP)

Dillingham Park
Attendance: 852
Referee: Harry Walbaum

25 November 2023
14:30

(1 BP) Doncaster Knights	29 – 24	London Scottish (1 BP)

Castle Park
Attendance: 2,264
Referee: Richard Gordon

25 November 2023
14:30

(1 BP) Ealing Trailfinders	31 – 13	Coventry

Trailfinders Sports Ground
Attendance: 1,237
Referee: Matthew Carley

25 November 2023
15:00

(1 BP) Bedford Blues	59 – 19	Cambridge

Goldington Road
Attendance: 2,998
Referee: Craig Maxwell-Keys

Bye/s: Caldy

=== Round 6 ===
1 December 2023
19:45

(1 BP) Nottingham	22 – 19	Cambridge (1 BP)

Lady Bay Sports Ground
Attendance: 1,243
Referee: Hamish Smales

2 December 2023
14:00

Caldy	P – P	Bedford Blues

Paton Field

- Postponed due to frozen pitch. Game to be rescheduled for 10 February 2024.

2 December 2023
15:00

(1 BP) Coventry	29 – 47	Hartpury University (1 BP)

Butts Park Arena
Attendance: 3,146
Referee: Jonathan Cook

2 December 2023
15:00

London Scottish	19 – 17	Ealing Trailfinders (1 BP)

Athletic Ground
Attendance: 835
Referee: Luke Pearce

3 December 2023
14:30

(1 BP) Cornish Pirates	28 – 39	Doncaster Knights (1 BP)

Mennaye Field
Attendance: 1,286
Referee: Joe James

Bye/s: Ampthill

=== Round 7 ===
16 December 2023
13:30

(1 BP) Ampthill	21 – 26	Caldy (1 BP)

Dillingham Park
Attendance: 1,276
Referee: Jack Makepeace

16 December 2023
14:00

Cambridge	19 – 33	Coventry (1 BP)

Grantchester Road
Attendance: 1,183
Referee: Jonathan Cook

16 December 2023
14:30

(1 BP) Hartpury University	33 – 31	London Scottish (2 BP)

ALPAS Arena
Attendance: 743
Referee: Alexander Thomas

16 December 2023
15:00

(1 BP) Bedford Blues	49 – 24	Nottingham (1 BP)

Goldington Road
Attendance: 2,514
Referee: Andrew Wigley

16 December 2023
15:00

Ealing Trailfinders	A – A	Cornish Pirates

Trailfinders Sports Ground

- Abandoned due to player suffering serious injury. Game to be rescheduled for 10 February 2024.

Bye/s: Doncaster Knights

=== Round 8 ===
23 December 2023
13:30

Ampthill	22 – 31	Bedford Blues (1 BP)

Dillingham Park
Attendance: 2,837
Referee: Alex Thomas

23 December 2023
14:00

Caldy	24 – 19	Doncaster Knights (1 BP)

Paton Field
Attendance: 1,500
Referee: Dan Rhys Jones

23 December 2023
14:30

Cornish Pirates	14 – 7	Hartpury University (1 BP)

Mennaye Field
Attendance: 2,474
Referee: Joe James

23 December 2023
15:00

(2 BP) London Scottish	26 – 28	Cambridge (1 BP)

Athletic Ground
Attendance: 520
Referee: Mike Hudson

26 December 2023
15:00

(1 BP) Coventry	37 – 21	Nottingham

Butts Park Arena
Attendance: 5,047
Referee: Harry Walbaum

Bye/s: Ealing Trailfinders

=== Round 9 ===
1 January 2024
13:30

Bedford Blues	19 – 34	Coventry (1 BP)

Goldington Road
Attendance: 5,000
Referee: Andrew Jackson

12 January 2024
19:45

Nottingham	P – P	London Scottish

Lady Bay Sports Ground

- Postponed due to severe flooding causing Lady Bay Sports Ground to be closed for the foreseeable future. Game to be rescheduled for 15 March 2024.

13 January 2024
14:00

(2 BP) Cambridge	33 – 40	Cornish Pirates (1 BP)

Grantchester Road
Attendance: 1,142
Referee: Harry Walbaum

13 January 2024
14:00

Doncaster Knights	24 – 32	Ampthill (1 BP)

Castle Park
Attendance: 1,826
Referee: Andrew Jackson

13 January 2024
14:30

(1 BP) Ealing Trailfinders	54 – 28	Caldy (1 BP)

Trailfinders Sports Ground
Attendance: 750
Referee: Craig Maxwell Keys

Bye/s: Hartpury University

=== Round 10 ===
20 January 2024
14:00

Ampthill	P – P	Ealing Trailfinders

Dillingham Park

- Game postponed due to frozen pitch. Game to be rescheduled for 30 March 2024.

20 January 2024
14:00

Caldy	7 – 31	Hartpury University (1 BP)

Paton Field
Attendance: 1,245
Referee: Charles Gayther

20 January 2024
14:30

(1 BP) Cornish Pirates	41 – 12	Nottingham

Mennaye Field
Attendance: 1,594
Referee: Hamish Grant

20 January 2024
14:30

Doncaster Knights	26 – 20	Bedford Blues (2 BP)

Castle Park
Attendance: 1,916
Referee: Joe James

20 January 2024
15:00

(2 BP) London Scottish	38 – 40	Coventry (1 BP)

Athletic Ground
Attendance: 811
Referee: Richard Gordon

Bye/s: Cambridge

=== Round 11 ===
26 January 2024
19:45

(1 BP) Bedford Blues	32 – 25	London Scottish

Goldington Road
Attendance: 3,307
Referee: Hamish Smales

27 January 2024
14:00

(1 BP) Cambridge	33 – 14	Caldy

Grantchester Road
Attendance: 1,199
Referee: George Selwood

27 January 2024
14:30

(1 BP) Hartpury University	54 – 34	Ampthill (1 BP)

ALPAS Arena
Attendance: 646
Referee: Alex Thomas

27 January 2024
15:00

(1 BP) Coventry	19 – 21	Cornish Pirates

Butts Park Arena
Attendance: 4,307
Referee: Joe James

27 January 2024
15:00

(1 BP) Ealing Trailfinders	49 – 31	Doncaster Knights (1 BP)

Trailfinders Sports Ground
Attendance: 1,157
Referee: Dan Rhys Jones

Bye/s: Nottingham

=== Round 12 ===
3 February 2024
12:00

(1 BP) Doncaster Knights	29 – 19	Cambridge

Castle Park
Attendance: 1,382
Referee: Hamish Grant

3 February 2024
14:00

(2 BP) Ampthill	36 – 43	Nottingham (1 BP)

Dillingham Park
Attendance: 523
Referee: Andrew Wigley

3 February 2024
14:00

(1 BP) Caldy	26 – 22	Coventry (1 BP)

Paton Field
Attendance: 1,046
Referee: Craig Maxwell-Keys

3 February 2024
15:00

(1 BP) Ealing Trailfinders	36 – 20	Hartpury University

Trailfinders Sports Ground
Attendance: 745
Referee: Michael Hudson

3 February 2024
16:00

(1 BP) Bedford Blues	21 – 27	Cornish Pirates

Goldington Road
Attendance: 2,734
Referee: Andrew Jackson

Bye/s: London Scottish

=== Rounds 6 & 7 (rescheduled games) ===
10 February 2024
14:00

(1 BP) Caldy	22 – 26	Bedford Blues

Paton Field
Attendance: 895
Referee: Dan Rhys Jones

- Game rescheduled from 2 December 2023.

10 February 2024
15:00

(1 BP) Ealing Trailfinders	40 – 12	Cornish Pirates

Trailfinders Sports Ground
Attendance: 732
Referee: Alexander Thomas

- Game rescheduled from 16 December 2023.

=== Round 13 ===
23 February 2024
19:45

(1 BP) Nottingham	14 – 20	Doncaster Knights

Lady Bay Sports Ground
Attendance: 1,039
Referee: Alex Thomas

24 February 2024
14:00

Cambridge	7 – 57	Ealing Trailfinders (1 BP)

Grantchester Road
Attendance: 1,309
Referee: Joe James

24 February 2024
14:30

(1 BP) Coventry	34 – 6	Ampthill

Butts Park Arena
Attendance: 2,507
Referee: Dan Rhys Jones

24 February 2024
14:30

(1 BP) Hartpury University	41 – 35	Bedford Blues (2 BP)

ALPAS Arena
Attendance: 1,213
Referee: Richard Gordon

24 February 2024
14:30

London Scottish	33 – 33	Caldy (1 BP)

Athletic Ground
Attendance: 604
Referee: Sara Cox

Bye/s: Cornish Pirates

=== Round 14 ===
1 March 2024
19:45

(1 BP) Hartpury University	61 – 10	Cambridge

ALPAS Arena
Attendance: 1,312
Referee: Sara Cox

2 March 2024
14:00

(1 BP) Ampthill	35 – 12	London Scottish

Dillingham Park
Attendance: 605
Referee: Christophe Ridley

2 March 2024
14:00

Caldy	14 – 32	Cornish Pirates (1 BP)

Paton Field
Attendance: 1,024
Referee: Ian Tempest

2 March 2024
14:30

Doncaster Knights	12 – 27	Coventry

Castle Park
Attendance: 2,038
Referee: Luke Pearce

2 March 2024
14:30

(1 BP) Ealing Trailfinders	52 – 26	Nottingham (1 BP)

Trailfinder Sports Ground
Attendance: 1,560
Referee: Adam Leal

Bye/s: Bedford Blues

=== Round 15 ===
8 March 2024
19:45

(1 BP) Nottingham	0 – 3	Hartpury University

Lady Bay Sports Ground
Attendance: 1,049
Referee: Hamish Grant

9 March 2024
13:00

London Scottish	20 – 34	Doncaster Knights

Athletic Ground
Attendance: 481
Referee: Matthew Carley

9 March 2024
14:30

(1 BP) Coventry	34 – 32	Ealing Trailfinders (2 BP)

Butts Park Arena
Attendance: 3,182
Referee: Tom Foley

9 March 2024
15:00

Cambridge	12 – 22	Bedford Blues (1 BP)

Grantchester Road
Attendance: 1,989
Referee: Anthony Woodthorpe

10 March 2024
14:30

(1 BP) Cornish Pirates	33 – 14	Ampthill

Mennaye Field
Attendance: 1,247
Referee: Hamish Grant

Bye/s: Caldy

=== Round 9 (rescheduled game) ===
15 March 2024
19:45

(1 BP) Nottingham	31 – 28	London Scottish (2 BP)

Lady Bay Sports Ground
Attendance: 938
Referee: Craig Maxwell-Keys

- Game rescheduled from 12 January 2024.

=== Round 16 ===
23 March 2024
14:30

Doncaster Knights	27 – 27	Cornish Pirates (1 BP)

Castle Park
Attendance: 2,012
Referee: George Selwood

23 March 2024
14:30

Hartpury University	17 – 47	Coventry (1 BP)

ALPAS Arena
Attendance: 1,202
Referee: Dan Rhys Jones

23 March 2024
15:00

(1 BP) Bedford Blues	27 – 14	Caldy

Goldington Road
Attendance: 2,526
Referee: Hamish Grant

23 March 2024
15:00

(1 BP) Cambridge	15 – 20	Nottingham

Grantchester Road
Attendance: 1,434
Referee: Alexander Thomas

23 March 2024
15:00

(1 BP) Ealing Trailfinders	52 – 35	London Scottish (1 BP)

Trailfinders Sports Ground
Attendance: 1,051
Referee: Charles Gayther

Bye/s: Ampthill

=== Round 10 (rescheduled game) ===
30 March 2024
15:00

(1 BP) Ampthill	29 – 21	Ealing Trailfinders

Dillingham Park
Attendance: 1,015
Referee: Harry Walbaum

- Game rescheduled from 20 January 2024.

=== Round 17 ===
5 April 2024
19:30

Cornish Pirates	17 – 26	Ealing Trailfinders

Mennaye Field
Attendance: 1,914
Referee: Dan Rhys Jones

5 April 2024
19:45

(1 BP) London Scottish	29 – 26	Hartpury University (2 BP)

Athletic Ground
Attendance: 517
Referee: Michael Hudson

5 April 2024
19:45

Nottingham	24 – 34	Bedford Blues (1 BP)

Lady Bay Sports Ground
Attendance: 1,286
Referee: Richard Gordon

5 April 2024
20:00

(1 BP) Coventry	64 – 12	Cambridge

Butts Park Arena
Attendance: 2,964
Referee: Hamish Grant

6 April 2024
15:00

Caldy	20 – 29	Ampthill (1 BP)

Paton Field
Attendance: 1,021
Referee: Alexander Thomas

Bye/s: Doncaster Knights

=== Round 18 ===
13 April 2024
14:30

(1 BP) Hartpury University	25 – 30	Cornish Pirates (1 BP)

ALPAS Arena
Attendance: 1,603
Referee: Alex Thomas

13 April 2024
15:00

(2 BP) Bedford Blues	24 – 29	Ampthill (1 BP)

Goldington Road
Attendance: 3,711
Referee: Jack Makepeace

13 April 2024
15:00

Cambridge	13 – 43	London Scottish (1 BP)

Grantchester Road
Attendance: 2,054
Referee: Richard Gordon

14 April 2024
14:30

(1 BP) Doncaster Knights	29 – 7	Caldy

Castle Park
Attendance: 1,594
Referee: Michael Hudson

14 April 2024
15:00

(1 BP) Nottingham	26 – 52	Coventry (1 BP)

Lady Bay Sports Meadow
Attendance: 1,303
Referee: Joe James

Bye/s: Ealing Trailfinders

=== Round 19 ===
20 April 2024
15:00

(1 BP) Ampthill	49 – 9	Doncaster Knights

Dillingham Park
Attendance: 1,028
Referee: George Selwood

20 April 2024
15:00

Caldy	18 – 49	Ealing Trailfinders (1 BP)

Paton Field
Attendance: 1,254
Referee: Craig Maxwell-Keys

20 April 2024
15:00

(1 BP) Coventry	54 – 19	Bedford Blues

Butts Park Arena
Attendance: 3,781
Referee: Harry Walbaum

20 April 2024
15:00

(1 BP) London Scottish	45 – 27	Nottingham (1 BP)

Athletic Ground
Attendance: 814
Referee: Jonathan Cook

21 April 2024
14:30

(1 BP) Cornish Pirates	45 – 18	Cambridge

Mennaye Field
Attendance: 1,414
Referee: Andrew Wigley

Bye/s: Hartpury University

=== Round 20 ===
3 May 2024
19:45

Nottingham	7 – 29	Cornish Pirates (1 BP)

Lady Bay Sports Ground
Attendance: 1,150
Referee: Hamish Grant

3 May 2024
20:00

(1 BP) Coventry	27 – 14	London Scottish

Butts Park Arena
Attendance: 2,771
Referee: Joe James

4 May 2024
14:30

(1 BP) Hartpury University	57 – 36	Caldy (1 BP)

ALPAS Arena
Attendance: 670
Referee: Dan Rhys Jones

4 May 2024
15:00

(1 BP) Bedford Blues	32 – 29	Doncaster Knights (2 BP)

Goldington Road
Attendance: 3,037
Referee: Craig Maxwell-Keys

4 May 2024
15:00

(1 BP) Ealing Trailfinders	57 – 14	Ampthill

Trailfinders Sports Ground
Attendance: 1,156
Referee: Sara Cox

Bye/s: Cambridge

=== Round 21 ===
11 May 2024
14:30

Cornish Pirates	22 – 12	Coventry

Mennaye Field
Attendance: 2,302
Referee: Harry Walbaum

11 May 2024
14:30

Doncaster Knights	20 – 12	Ealing Trailfinders

Castle Park
Attendance: 1,552
Referee: Alex Thomas

- Ealing Trailfinders are champions.

11 May 2024
15:00

(1 BP) Ampthill	36 – 44	Hartpury University (1 BP)

Dillingham Park
Attendance: 997
Referee: Simon Harding

11 May 2024
15:00

(1 BP) Caldy	31 – 28	Cambridge (2 BP)

Paton Field
Attendance: 1,295
Referee: Andrew Jackson

11 May 2024
15:00

(2 BP) London Scottish	31 – 34	Bedford Blues (1 BP)

Athletic Ground
Attendance: 1,053
Referee: Richard Gordon

Bye/s: Nottingham

=== Round 22 ===
24 May 2024
19:45

(1 BP) Nottingham	28 – 8	Caldy

Lady Bay Sports Ground
Attendance: 1,417
Referee: Andrew Wigley

25 May 2024
14:30

(1 BP) Ealing Trailfinders	59 – 12	Bedford Blues

Trailfinders Sports Ground
Attendance: 2,155
Referee: Harry Walbaum

25 May 2024
14:30

(1 BP) Hartpury University	43 – 14	Doncaster Knights

ALPAS Arena
Attendance: 720
Referee: Jonathan Cook

25 May 2024
15:00

(1 BP) Cambridge	28 – 37	Ampthill (1 BP)

Grantchester Road
Attendance: 1,489
Referee: Craig Maxwell-Keys

25 May 2024
15:00

(1 BP) London Scottish	28 – 37	Cornish Pirates (1 BP)

Athletic Ground
Attendance: 924
Referee: Simon Harding

Bye/s: Coventry

== Attendances ==
Club	Home Games	Total	Average	Highest	Lowest	% Capacity
Ampthill	10	10,598	1,060	2,837	523	35%
Bedford Blues	10	30,621	3,062	5,000	2,380	61%
Caldy	10	11,816	1,182	1,500	895	30%
Cambridge	10	14,192	1,419	2,054	1,085	65%
Cornish Pirates	10	16,242	1,624	2,474	1,143	41%
Coventry	10	33,733	3,373	5,047	2,507	65%
Doncaster Knights	10	18,512	1,851	2,264	1,382	36%
Ealing Trailfinders	10	11,354	1,135	2,155	732	23%
Hartpury	10	9,340	934	1,603	486	47%
London Scottish	10	7,322	732	1,053	481	16%
Nottingham	10	11,612	1,161	1,417	938	33%

== Leading scorers ==
Note: Flags to the left of player names indicate national team as has been defined under World Rugby eligibility rules, or primary nationality for players who have not yet earned international senior caps. Players may hold one or more non-WR nationalities.

=== Most points ===
As of 25 May 2024

Rank	Player	Club	Points
1	(Tonga) Patrick Pellegrini	Coventry	184
2	(England) Harry Bazalgette	Hartpury	181
3	(England) Craig Willis	Ealing Trailfinders	144
4	(England) Will Maisey	Bedford Blues	138
5	(England) Russell Bennett	Doncaster Knights	115
6	(Wales) Gwyn Parks	Ampthill	105
7	(Ireland) Bruce Houston	Cornish Pirates	101
8	(England) Alec Lloyd-Seed	London Scottish	85
9	(England) Matt Cornish	Ealing Trailfinders	80

=== Most tries ===
As of 25 May 2024

Rank	Player	Club	Tries
1	(England) Matt Cornish	Ealing Trailfinders	16
2	(Ireland) Seán French	Bedford Blues	15
2	(England) James Martin	Coventry	15
4	(England) Brandon Jackson	Ampthill	14
5	(England) Dean Adamson	Bedford Blues	13
6	(England) Tobias Elliott	Ampthill	12
6	(England) Matt Gallagher	Caldy	12
6	(England) Ryan Hutler	Coventry	12
6	(England) William Wand	Coventry	12
6	(England) David Williams	Nottingham	12

== See also ==
- 2023–24 Premiership Rugby
- 2023–24 Premiership Rugby Cup
