= Ollie Fletcher =

Ollie Fletcher may refer to:

- Oliver Fletcher, American football guard
- Ollie Fletcher (rugby union), English rugby union player
