= Seb Blake =

English rugby union player

- Born: 5 October 2001 (age 25) Cheltenham, England
- Height: 1.85 m (6 ft 1 in)
- Weight: 114 kg (17 st 13 lb; 251 lb)
- School: Cheltenham College

Rugby union career
- Position: Hooker
- Current team: Gloucester
Senior career
Years	Team	Apps	(Points)
2021–	Gloucester	76	(110)
- Correct as of 4 Mar 2026

Seb Blake (born 5 October 2001) is an English professional rugby union player who plays as a hooker for Gloucester Rugby.

== Early life ==
Blake's mother was born in Perth, Western Australia and emigrated to England with her family aged ten.

Blake attended Richard Pate School for his primary education, before beginning at Cheltenham College for his secondary education. Blake joined the Gloucester Rugby pathway at U14 level. Despite having to step away from the game the following year due to injury he returned to the game at the U16 age group. He signed a scholarship contract with Gloucester ahead of the 2020–2021 season to join the club's senior Academy.

== Career ==
Blake made his Gloucester Rugby debut in the 2021–22 season, making three appearances in the Premiership Rugby Cup. The following season he made 18 appearances in all competitions, including starting in the 2022–23 European Rugby Champions Cup.

In March 2024 Blake came off the bench as Gloucester beat Leicester Tigers to win the 2023–24 Premiership Rugby Cup. Later that season he scored tries during their 2023–24 EPCR Challenge Cup quarter-final victory against Ospreys and semi-final win over Benetton. He started in the final as Gloucester were defeated by Sharks at Tottenham Hotspur Stadium to finish runners up. He had started every league game for Gloucester in the 2024–25 season prior to signing a new contract with the club in late January 2025.

== International career ==
In February 2024 Blake was called up to the England A team.
