= Toby Knight (rugby union) =

English rugby union player (born 2002)

- Born: Toby Knight; 5 January 2002 (age 24)
- Height: 1.90 m (6 ft 3 in)
- Weight: 112 kg (17 st 9 lb)
- School: Berkhamsted School

Rugby union career
- Position(s): Flanker, Number 8
- Current team: Saracens
Amateur team(s)
Years	Team	Apps	(Points)
–	Westcliff	–	(–)
Senior career
Years	Team	Apps	(Points)
2020–	Saracens	48	(30)
2022–2024	→Ampthill	10	(0)
- Correct as of 16 February 2025
International career
Years	Team	Apps	(Points)
2019–2020	England U18	–	(–)
2022	England U20	9	(10)
- Correct as of 16 February 2025

Toby Knight (born 5 January 2002) is an English professional rugby union player. He currently plays as a back row forward for Saracens, which competes in Premiership Rugby, the top-level competition of English rugby.

== Early life ==
Knight grew up in Southend-on-Sea, Essex and attended Shoeburyness High School. He played youth rugby at Westcliff, later earning a scholarship to Berkhamsted School. This would eventually lead to his recruitment into the Saracens academy.

== Club career ==
After progressing through the junior ranks and into the Saracens senior academy, Knight made his initial first-team appearances in the pool stages of the 2021–22 Premiership Rugby Cup, prior to his Premiership debut away to Gloucester in June 2022, at the end of the 2021–22 regular season. In these matches, he was deployed both as a flanker and as a Number 8. Before the start of the 2022–23 season, Knight was promoted into the Saracens first-team squad on a full-time basis. During this season, he was also dual-registered with Ampthill in the RFU Championship.

Knight helped Saracens to win the Premiership title in 2023, and was an unused replacement in the final, as Saracens defeated Sale Sharks by a score of 35–25. Later that year, he made his European Champions Cup debut in a 2023–24 pool stage match against the Bulls, before signing a new two-year contract with Saracens in May 2024. For his performances in the 2023–24 Championship while on loan at Ampthill, Knight was nominated for the RFU Championship Team of the Season.

== International career ==
Knight has represented England at age-group level, receiving a call-up to the England U18s when he was just 17. He was also part of the England U20s squad for the 2022 U20s Six Nations Championship. During the tournament, Knight captained England on several occasions, notably including his debut appearance against Scotland U20s, when he scored two tries on the way to a 41–24 victory. Later that same year, he featured for England in the U20s Summer Series.
