= Tobias Elliott =

English rugby union player

- Born: Tobias Elliott; 16 September 2003 (age 23) Watford, England
- Height: 1.86 m (6 ft 1 in)
- Weight: 93 kg (14 st 9 lb)
- School: Watford Grammar School; Berkhamsted School

Rugby union career
- Position: Utility back
- Current team: Saracens
Amateur team(s)
Years	Team	Apps	(Points)
–	Harrow RFC	–	(–)
Senior career
Years	Team	Apps	(Points)
2022–	Saracens	24	(52)
2022–23	→Old Albanians	–	(–)
2023–24	→Ampthill	17	(62)
- Correct as of 12 February 2025
International career
Years	Team	Apps	(Points)
2021	England U18s	–	(–)
2023	England U20s	7	(25)
2025	England A	0	(0)
- Correct as of 12 February 2025

Tobias Elliott (born 16 September 2003) is an English professional rugby union player who plays as a utility back for Premiership Rugby club Saracens.

== Early life ==
Elliott was born and raised in Watford, Hertfordshire and educated at Watford Grammar School for Boys. He began playing rugby at a young age, through the minis section at Harrow Rugby Club, where his father Andy was a member of the senior first team. As a teenager, Elliott joined the Saracens junior academy and played for their age-grade teams, in addition to representing his school rugby teams in national competition – firstly the Old Fullerians at Watford Grammar, and later Berkhamsted School. In 2021, he was part of the squad that won Berkhamsted's first ever SOCS Daily Mail Schools Trophy, scoring a try in the title-deciding match against Dulwich College.

== Club career ==
After progressing into the Saracens senior academy in 2022, Elliott made his senior debut for the club at the age of 19, in a 2022–23 Premiership Rugby Cup pool stage match against Harlequins. He was involved in all of the side's cup fixtures, scoring one try as he played across the backline, at full-back, fly-half and inside centre. Although he spent much of 2022–23 on loan at Old Albanians in the National League 2 East, Elliott ended the season by making his Premiership debut for Saracens in May 2023, coming off the bench against Bath.

The following season, Elliott was one of several Saracens players who were dual-registered with second-division side Ampthill. He made 16 appearances for the club in the 2023–24 RFU Championship – registering 12 tries, primarily as a winger – while also featuring for Saracens three times in the 2023–24 Premiership Rugby Cup.

Ahead of the 2024–25 Premiership Rugby season, Elliott was promoted into the Saracens senior squad. Subsequently, he made his first Premiership start on 21 September 2024, in a 35–26 victory against Gloucester on the opening weekend. Elliott quickly established himself as a regular starter on the wing, earning plaudits as he scored three tries in as many league games to begin the campaign. For his performances, he was shortlisted for the Rugby Players' Association 15 Under 23 Player of the Month Award for September 2024. In December that year, he made his European Champions Cup debut, starting in a pool stage win against the Bulls.

== International career ==
Elliott has represented England at under-18s, under-19s and under-20s level. Notably, he recorded five tries in as many appearances for the England U20s during the 2023 Six Nations Under 20s Championship. Later that year, he was included in the England squad at the 2023 World Rugby U20 Championship.

In February 2025, Elliott was called up to the England A squad, ahead of that month's fixture against Ireland A.

In May 2025 Elliott was called up to a training camp for the senior England squad by Steve Borthwick.
