= Josh Hathaway =

Welsh rugby union player

- Born: Joshua Hathaway; 19 October 2003 (age 23) Aberystwyth, Wales
- Height: 1.83 m (6 ft 0 in)
- Weight: 84 kg (13.2 st; 185 lb)
- School: Ysgol Penglais
- University: Hartpury College

Rugby union career
- Position(s): Wing, Full-back, Fly-half
Amateur team(s)
Years	Team	Apps	(Points)
- Aberystwyth RFC
Senior career
Years	Team	Apps	(Points)
2022–	Gloucester	30	(60)
International career
Years	Team	Apps	(Points)
2022	Wales U20	1	(0)
2023	England U20	4	(20)
2024–	Wales	1	(0)

Joshua Hathaway (born 19 October 2003) is a Welsh professional rugby union player who plays as a wing for Gloucester and Wales. He can also play fly-half and full-back.

== Early life ==
Born in Aberystwyth, Hathaway attended Ysgol Penglais School. He later attended Hartpury College in Gloucestershire.

== Career ==
Hathaway played for Aberystwyth RFC and represented Ceredigion Schools at age group level. He was a member of the Scarlets Academy. Hathaway signed a three-year contract with Gloucester in November 2022. He made his debut for Gloucester in the Premiership Rugby Cup in November 2022.

In March 2024 Hathaway came off the bench as Gloucester defeated Leicester Tigers to win the 2023–24 Premiership Rugby Cup. The following month saw him score a hat-trick during a league fixture against Saracens. At the end of that season Hathaway scored a try during the 2023–24 EPCR Challenge Cup semi-final victory over Benetton and came off the bench in the final at Tottenham Hotspur Stadium as Gloucester were beaten by Sharks to finish runners up.

== International career ==
Hathaway was capped by Wales U20 in March 2022. Later that year, he changed his national allegiance in order to represent England qualifying through a paternal grandmother. In February 2023 Hathaway made his first start for England U20 and scored a hat-trick of tries in 15 minutes on his debut against Scotland during the opening round of the 2023 Six Nations Under 20s Championship. He was identified by BBC Sport as one of the stars of the under-20 Six Nations tournament.

In June 2024, Hathaway was called up to the senior Wales squad for their tour of Australia. On 6 July 2024 he made his Test debut starting against Australia in Sydney.
