= George Barton (rugby union, born 2000) =

English rugby union player

- Born: George Peter Barton; 7 November 2000 (age 26) Cheltenham, England
- Height: 1.83 m (6 ft 0 in)
- Weight: 85 kg (13 st 5 lb)

Rugby union career
- Position: Fly-half
- Current team: Gloucester
Senior career
| Years | Team | Apps | (Points) |
| 2019– | Gloucester | 49 | (255) |
- Correct as of 9 December 2023
International career
| Years | Team | Apps | (Points) |
| 2020 | England U20 | 4 | (11) |
- Correct as of 9 December 2023

George Barton (born 7 November 2000) is an English professional rugby union player who plays as a fly-half for Premiership Rugby club Gloucester.

== Career ==
Barton spent time in the youth system of football league club Cheltenham Town. He started playing junior rugby for local side Longlevens RFC and in 2014 joined the academy of Gloucester. In September 2019 he made his senior debut against London Irish. Barton represented England U20 during the 2020 Junior Six Nations scoring a try in a defeat against Wales.

On 9 December 2023, Barton scored all 15 of Gloucester's points to help them defeat Black Lion in the pool stages of the European Challenge Cup. Later that season he scored ten points in the 2023–24 Premiership Rugby Cup final as Gloucester beat Leicester Tigers to lift the trophy.

== Honours ==
Gloucester

- Premiership Rugby Cup winner: 2023–24

Individual

- Premiership Rugby Cup top points scorer: 2023–24 (46)
