= Jamal Ford-Robinson =

English rugby union player (born 1993)

- Born: Jamal Michael Ford-Robinson; 11 September 1993 (age 33) Bristol, England
- Height: 1.78 m (5 ft 10 in)
- Weight: 118 kg (18 st 8 lb)

Rugby union career
- Position: Tighthead Prop
- Current team: Gloucester
Youth career
- 2010–2012: Leicester Tigers
Senior career
| Years | Team | Apps | (Points) |
| 2012–2014 | Cambridge | 35 | (20) |
| 2014 | Cornish Pirates | 19 | (0) |
| 2015–2017 | Bristol | 48 | (20) |
| 2017–2019 | Northampton Saints | 25 | (0) |
| 2019– | Gloucester | 106 | (55) |
- Correct as of 5 Dec 2025
International career
| Years | Team | Apps | (Points) |
| 2014 | England Counties XV | | |
| 2017 | England XV | 1 | (0) |
- Correct as of 7 May 2020

Jamal Ford-Robinson (born 11 September 1993) is an English professional rugby union player who plays as a prop for Premiership Rugby side Gloucester.

Ford-Robinson has also spent time wrestling under the ring name 'Krisys' before returning to play for Bristol Bears.

== Early life ==
Ford-Robinson was born in Bristol, at the age of 5 years old he moved with his mother to Penryn and started playing rugby at the local club. He has many half-siblings, at least 10, through his father's different relationships.

== Club career ==
Ford-Robinson had trials at Bristol and Leicester before starting his rugby career in Leicester Tigers's academy at 16. Ford-Robinson struggled with a conversion to the position of hooker from his preferred position of prop, said he probably suffered from anxiety during this period, and left Leicester mid-way through his second season. Motivated by the videos of Arnold Schwarzenegger, Ford-Robinson then moved to National League 1 club Cambridge to continue his dream of playing professional rugby. Ford-Robinson played for two seasons under coach Craig Newby who he knew from Leicester. After a first season where Cambridge were relegated from National League 1, Ford-Robinson played regularly in National League 2. At the end of that season he played in the 2014 County Championship for his native Cornwall, scoring a try at Twickenham in the final.

After the final he joined RFU Championship side Cornish Pirates in 2014.

Ford-Robinson then switched to Bristol Bears for the 2015–16 season and aided in their promotion into the Premiership that season. The prop made 48 appearances in a Bristol shirt and suffered with the club as they were relegated back to the Championship at the end of the 2016–17 campaign. The young prop left his birthplace of Bristol to join Northampton Saints for the 2017–18 season after signing for the Midlands club on 2 February 2017.

In March 2019, Ford-Robinson signed a 2-year deal with Premiership Rivals Gloucester Rugby. Following the COVID-19 pandemic in early 2020, he started making humorous videos on the video-sharing website TikTok. The videos gained wide attention from the rugby community which lead to Ford-Robinson winning Premiership Rugby's Community Player of the Month.

Ford-Robinson came off the bench as a substitute for the Gloucester side that defeated Leicester in the 2023–24 Premiership Rugby Cup final to lift the trophy. At the end of that season he started in the final of the 2023–24 EPCR Challenge Cup at Tottenham Hotspur Stadium which they lost against Sharks to finish runners up.

== International career ==
In 2014 Ford-Robinson played for England Counties XV against a Georgian side. While at Bristol, Ford-Robinson was noticed by coach Eddie Jones who selected him for a senior England side for a non-cap friendly against the Barbarians at Twickenham on 28 May 2017. Ford-Robinson come off the bench as a substitute. He was subsequently included in their 2017 tour of Argentina squad as injury cover for Nick Schonert.

== Honours ==
Gloucester

- 1× Premiership Rugby Cup: 2023–24
- 1× EPCR Challenge Cup runner up: 2023–24
