= Jack Clement (rugby union) =

English rugby union player

- Born: Jack Andrew Clement; 27 February 2001 (age 25) Walsall, West Midlands, England
- Height: 1.91 m (6 ft 3 in)
- Weight: 113 kg (17 st 11 lb)
- School: Cheltenham College

Rugby union career
- Position(s): Flanker, Number 8
Senior career
Years	Team	Apps	(Points)
2019–	Gloucester	114	(95)
- Correct as of 5 Dec 2025
International career
Years	Team	Apps	(Points)
2018	England U18	6	(0)
2018–2019	England U20	7	(5)
- Correct as of 13 July 2021

Jack Clement (born 27 February 2001) is an English professional rugby union player who plays as a flanker for Premiership Rugby club Gloucester.

== Rugby career ==
=== Club ===
Clement began his rugby career at Bournside School when he was fourteen and went on to captain Cheltenham College. He joined the academy of Gloucester aged seventeen and made his senior debut during the 2019–20 season.

=== International ===
In February 2018 Clement was selected for the England Under-17 team and later that year made his England U18 debut against France in the International summer Series playing all three games during their tour of South Africa. He played twice for England U20 in the curtailed 2020 Six Nations Under 20s Championship. Later that year Clement received his first call-up to the senior England squad by coach Eddie Jones for a training camp.

Clement started every game for the England side that completed a grand slam in the 2021 Six Nations Under 20s Championship. He was player of the match against Ireland and scored his only try of the competition during the penultimate round against Wales. A candidate for player of the tournament, however this honour was awarded to teammate and captain of the side, Jack van Poortvliet.

In February 2024 he was called up to the England A team.

== Honours ==
Gloucester

- Premiership Rugby Cup winner: 2023–24

Individual

- Premiership Rugby Cup top try scorer: 2023–24 (8)
