= Louis Hillman-Cooper =

English rugby union player

- Born: Louis Hillman-Cooper; 22 December 2001 (age 24) Brentwood, Essex, England
- Height: 1.9 m (6 ft 3 in)
- Weight: 98 kg (15 st 6 lb)
- School: Cheltenham College

Rugby union career
- Position: Centre
- Current team: Gloucester
Amateur team(s)
Years	Team	Apps	(Points)
- Wymondham RFC
Senior career
Years	Team	Apps	(Points)
2021–	Gloucester	20	(15)
- Correct as of 25 July 2024
International career
Years	Team	Apps	(Points)
2019–2020	England U18s		
2020–2021	England U20s		
- Correct as of 25 July 2024

Louis Hillman-Cooper (born 22 December 2001) is an English rugby union player who plays for Gloucester in the Premiership Rugby.

Hillman-Cooper joined the Gloucester academy aged 16 and made his England U18 debut against Scotland in March 2019, also playing against France a week later. He was included in the England U20s squad for the 2021 Six Nations Under 20s Championship.

He made his debut during the Premiership Rugby Cup against local rivals Bath in November 2021.
