= Jacob Morris (rugby union) =

English rugby union player

- Born: Jacob Aaron Morris; 12 May 2000 (age 26) Cheltenham, England
- Height: 1.85 m (6 ft 1 in)
- Weight: 94 kg (14 st 11 lb)

Rugby union career
- Position: Wing/Fullback
Amateur team(s)
Years	Team	Apps	(Points)
- Old Patesians RFC
Senior career
Years	Team	Apps	(Points)
2018–2026	Gloucester	31	(55)
2026–	Ealing Trailfinders	0	(0)
- Correct as of 26 July 2024

Jacob Morris (born 12 May 2000) is an English rugby union player who plays for Gloucester in the Premiership Rugby.

Morris was a prolific try scorer in the Under-18 Academy League which saw him get called up to England U18 and Morris made his first-team debut for Gloucester in the Premiership Rugby Cup against Wasps back in October 2018.

His father named Simon Morris played 104 games for Gloucester as a centre/wing between 1990 and 1997.

On 8 July 2026, Morris would leave Gloucester to sign for Ealing Trailfinders in the RFU Championship from the 2026-27 season.
