= Micky Ward (rugby union) =

English rugby union player

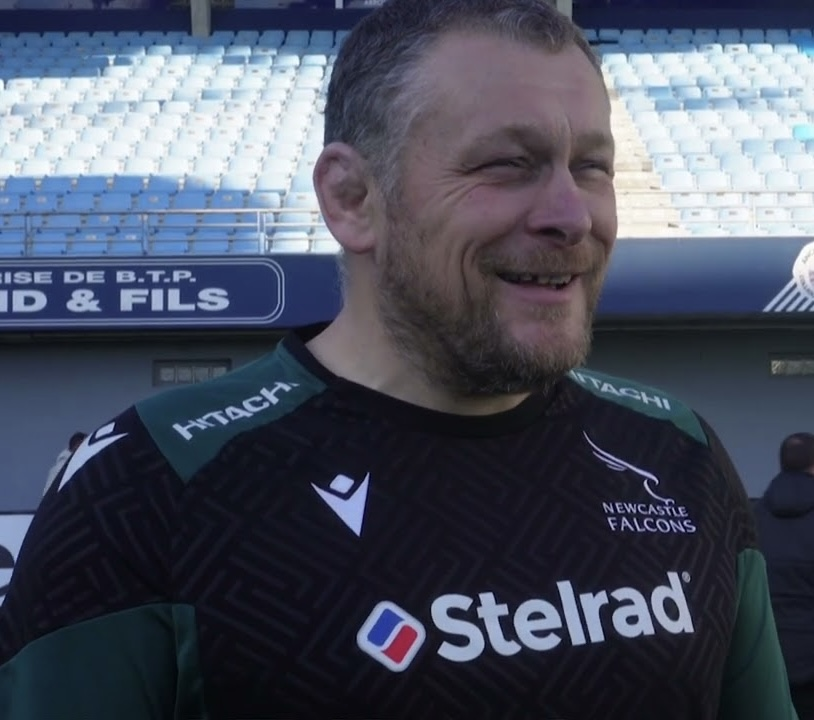
- Micky Ward with Newcastle Falcons in 2024
- Born: Michael Ward; 9 January 1979 (age 47) Wallsend, Tyne and Wear, England
- Height: 1.80 m (5 ft 11 in)
- Weight: 118 kg (18 st 8 lb)
- School: Burnside Community High School

Rugby union career
- Position: Prop
- Current team: Newcastle Falcons
Youth career
- Wallsend RFC
Senior career
Years	Team	Apps	(Points)
2002–2011	Newcastle Falcons	287	(35)

Micky Ward (born 9 January 1979 in Wallsend, Tyne and Wear, England) is an English rugby union coach and is currently Forwards coach at Newcastle Falcons.

He was a rugby union player for Newcastle Falcons in the Guinness Premiership. Ward played as a Prop.

Whilst at Newcastle he started in both the 2001 and 2004 Anglo-Welsh Cup finals as Newcastle emerged victorious from both. He left Newcastle in 2011 to join Blaydon RFC.
