= Cameron Jordan (rugby union) =

English rugby union player

- Born: Cameron David Stein Jordan; 17 November 1999 (age 26) Leicester, England
- Height: 1.98 m (6 ft 6 in)
- Weight: 122 kg (19 st 3 lb)
- School: Oakham School

Rugby union career
- Position: Lock/Blindside Flanker
- Current team: Newcastle Red Bulls
Senior career
Years	Team	Apps	(Points)
2017–2020	Leicester Tigers	6	(0)
2020–2026	Gloucester	81	(45)
2026–	Newcastle Red Bulls	0	(0)
- Correct as of 4 Mar 2026
International career
Years	Team	Apps	(Points)
2017–2018	England U18s		

Cameron Jordan (born 17 November 1999) is an English rugby union player for Newcastle Red Bulls in the Premiership Rugby.

Jordan represented England U18s for the 2018 Six Nations Festival.

He started his first senior game for Leicester Tigers against Wasps in the Anglo-Welsh Cup in February 2018.

In the summer of 2020, Jordan makes his move to Premiership rivals Gloucester, having come through the Tigers academy system. He made his debut, from the bench, in a Premiership clash against Saracens in August 2020.

On 10 July 2023, Jordan has signed his first professional deal with Gloucester, thus promoted to the senior squad ahead of the 2023–24 season.

On 21 January 2026, Jordan would leave Gloucester to sign for Premiership rivals Newcastle Red Bulls on a two-year deal from the 2026-27 season.
