= Caolan Englefield =

English rugby union player (born 1999)

- Englefield in 2026
- Born: Caolan Englefield; 1 November 1999 (age 27) Sutton, London, England
- Height: 1.77 m (5 ft 10 in)
- Weight: 80 kg (12 st 8 lb)
- School: Wimbledon College
- University: St Mary's University, Twickenham

Rugby union career
- Position: Scrum-half
- Current team: Gloucester
Amateur team(s)
Years	Team	Apps	(Points)
- Old Rutlishians RFC
Senior career
Years	Team	Apps	(Points)
2019–2023	London Irish	21	(15)
2023–	Gloucester	28	(21)
- Correct as of 5 Dec 2025
International career
Years	Team	Apps	(Points)
2016	England U16	1	(5)
2017–2018	Ireland U18	0	(0)
2018–2020	Ireland U19	3	(0)
2024–	England A	1	(0)
- Correct as of 23 February 2024

Caolan Englefield (born 1 November 1999) is an English professional rugby union player who plays as a scrum-half for Premiership Rugby club Gloucester.

== Career ==
=== Early life and education ===
A graduate from Old Rutlishians RFC in London Borough of Merton, Englefield joined the AASE programme whilst educated at St Paul's Catholic College at Sunbury-on-Thames. He was part of Harlequins junior academy at age 13 before joining London Irish. Englefield earned his degree in Sports Coaching at St Mary's University, Twickenham. In April 2016 he scored five points for England Under-16 in a defeat against Wales.

=== London Irish and Ireland Age-Groups ===
Englefield represented Ireland U18s played against English Counties twice and against Portugal U18s. He played for Ireland U19s, first against Japan U19s and in a two-test series against France U19s.

Englefield signed professional terms with London Irish from the summer of 2019. He made his debut from the bench against Harlequins in the Premiership Rugby Cup during the 2019–20 season. He scored his first try against Bristol Bears in the following PRC match. Englefield made his Premiership debut against Saracens later in the same season.

=== Gloucester and England A ===
In June 2023 London Irish filed for administration and were suspended from the Premiership and all leagues in the RFU system and it was announced that Englefield had signed with rivals Gloucester along with four other Exile teammates. In his first season at the club he started in the 2023–24 Premiership Rugby Cup final as they defeated Leicester Tigers to lift the trophy.

In February 2024 Englefield played for the England A side against Portugal.
