= Callum Atkinson =

English rugby union player

- Born: 14 April 1997 (age 29) Macclesfield, England
- Height: 6 ft 10 in (208 cm)
- Weight: 124 kg (273 lb)

Rugby union career
- Position: Lock
- Current team: Edinburgh
Senior career
Years	Team	Apps	(Points)
2018–19	Edinburgh	6	(0)
- Correct as of 8 May 2019

Callum Atkinson (born 14 April 1997) is a Scottish qualified, English rugby union player for Edinburgh in the Pro14. Atkinson's primary position is lock.

== Career ==
Atkinson made his debut for Edinburgh on 26 October 2018.
