= James Martin (rugby union) =

English rugby union player (born 1999)

- Born: 31 July 1999 (age 27)
- Height: 1.85 m (6 ft 1 in)
- Weight: 99 kg (218 lb; 15 st 8 lb)

Rugby union career
- Position: Winger
Youth career
- Leicester Tigers
Senior career
Years	Team	Apps	(Points)
2019–2025	Coventry	64	(195)
2025–	Northampton Saints	3	(5)
- Correct as of 31 January 2026

James Martin (born 31 July 1999) is an English professional rugby union footballer who plays as a winger for Premiership Rugby club Northampton Saints.

== Career ==
Martin began playing rugby union at the age of five-year-old at Sleaford RFC before later joining the rugby academy at Leicester Tigers in 2017. He also played for Hinckley RFC and in New Zealand for the North Harbour Development Team in Auckland, but his early career was hampered by a serious shoulder injury.

Returning to play in England, Martin played regularly in the RFU Championship for Coventry from 2019 until 2025, scoring 44 tries in 82 appearances.

Martin joined Northampton Saints ahead of the 2025-26 season. Upon his signing in July 2025, Northampton director of rugby Phil Dowson described Martin as having been "a standout player in the Championship over the past couple of seasons" who had shown "consistently that he's an excellent finisher". He made his Rugby Premiership debut for Northampton against Gloucester Rugby on 4 October 2025 in a 37-35 away victory for his side.
