= Zach Mercer =

England international rugby union player

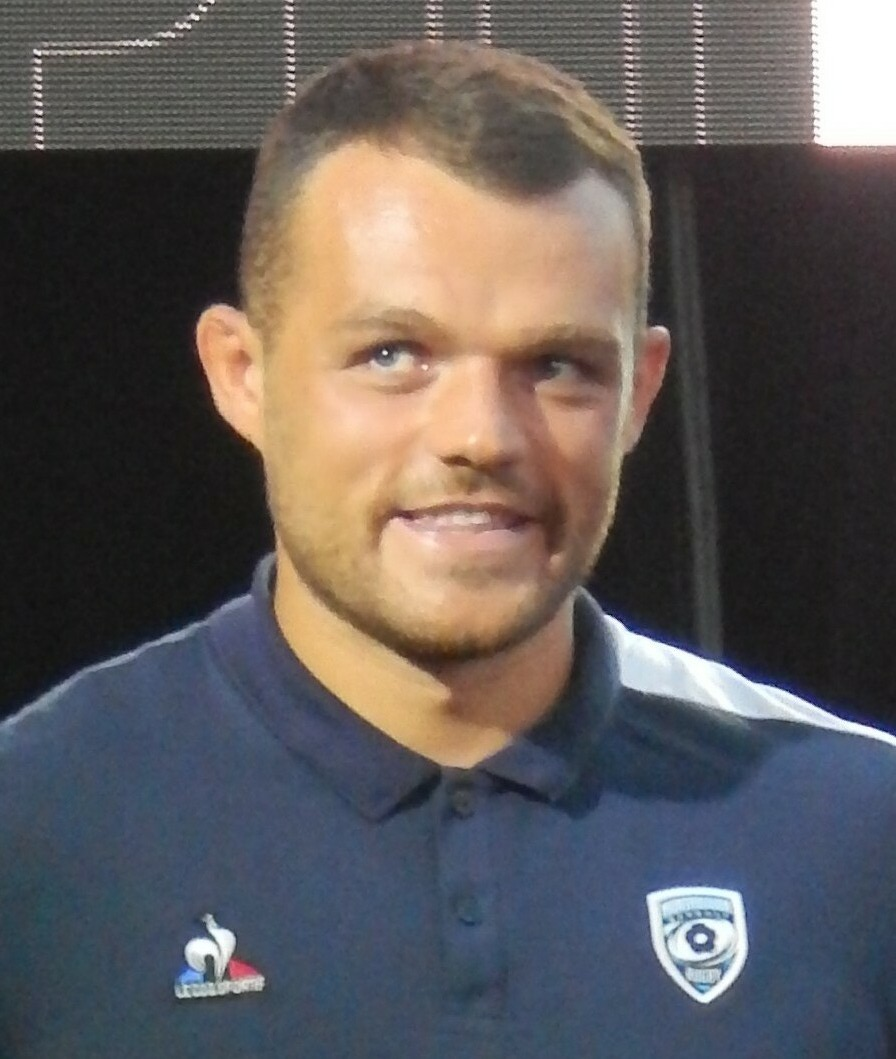
- Mercer with Montpellier in 2022
- Born: Zach Ivan Mercer; 28 June 1997 (age 29) Leeds, England
- Height: 1.90 m (6 ft 3 in)
- Weight: 111 kg (17 st 7 lb; 245 lb)
- School: Merchiston Castle School
- Notable relative: Gary Mercer (father)

Rugby union career
- Position(s): Number Eight, Flanker
- Current team: Gloucester Rugby
Youth career
- Old Brodleians
- Glasgow Hutchesons Aloysians
Senior career
Years	Team	Apps	(Points)
2016–2021	Bath	99	(135)
2021–2023	Montpellier	59	(35)
2023–2025	Gloucester	29	(25)
2025–	Toulon	11	(15)
- Correct as of 14 December 2025
International career
Years	Team	Apps	(Points)
2013	Scotland U16		
2015	England U18	6	(15)
2016–2017	England U20	17	(40)
2018	England	2	(0)
- Correct as of 18 June 2017

Zach Mercer (born 28 June 1997) is an English rugby union player who plays as a number eight or a flanker for Toulon in the Top14.

== Early life ==
Mercer was born in Leeds and grew up near Halifax. He played junior rugby for Old Brodleians. At the age of eight he moved with his family to Scotland. In Scotland he attended Netherlee Primary School and Williamwood High School in Glasgow. He left at the end of his third year and then he attended Merchiston Castle School and played for Glasgow Hutchesons Aloysians.

== Club career ==
Whilst living in Scotland, Mercer was a member of the Glasgow Warriors academy. In 2015, Mercer joined Bath.

In September 2016, Mercer made his club debut in a Premiership fixture against the Newcastle Falcons.

In February 2021 it was confirmed that Mercer would join French Top 14 side Montpellier ahead of the 2021–22 season. Mercer's maiden season in Montpellier was a success, with the side winning their first ever French Championship. Mercer also won some personal accolades, being named in the Top 14 Team of the Year and well as winning the Top 14 Player of the Year award.

On 30 August 2022, it was confirmed that Mercer would return to England to re-join the Premiership Rugby with Gloucester on a long-term deal ahead of the 2023–24 season.

On 9 July 2025, Mercer would leave Gloucester early as he signed a lucrative multi-year deal with French giants Toulon back in the Top 14 competition ahead of the 2025-26 season.

== International career ==
=== Youth teams ===
Mercer became a Scottish-qualified player through residency and played for the Scotland U16 team. In March 2015, Mercer represented England U18 at the U18 European Championship.

Mercer made his debut for the England U20 side during the 2016 Six Nations Under 20s Championship. In June 2016, Mercer scored a try against Italy U20 in the group stage of the 2016 Junior World Cup.

Mercer was captain of the England U20 team that completed the grand slam in the 2017 U20 Six Nations. Mercer also captained the team at the 2017 Junior World Cup, scoring the winning try in the semi-final against South Africa. They were defeated in the final by New Zealand. His performances saw Mercer nominated for World Rugby Junior Player of the Year.

=== Senior teams ===
Mercer received his first call up to the England national rugby union team for the 2017 Autumn Internationals, however coach Eddie Jones made it clear he would be treated as an apprentice player in the squad. In January 2018 he was named in England's squad for the 2018 Six Nations Championship and was no longer listed as an apprentice player. On 27 May 2018, Mercer started for England at number 8 in a non-test match against the Barbarians. Scoring a first half try on his England debut, a 63–45 loss for England, against an experienced Baa Baa lineup.

Mercer was selected to make his England debut against South Africa in the 2018 Autumn Internationals after Ben Morgan was dropped.

Eddie Jones announced that Mercer will gain his first start in a test match for England in their 2018 Autumn Internationals match against Japan.

== Personal life ==
Mercer's father is former rugby league footballer and coach Gary Mercer, who played for New Zealand and the New Zealand Māori rugby league team.

He is of Māori ancestry.
