= Freddie Clarke =

England international rugby union player

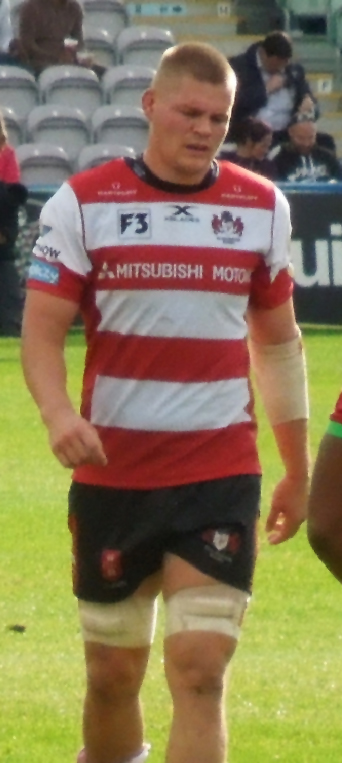
- Clarke in 2017
- Born: 10 October 1992 (age 34) Wandsworth, England
- Height: 1.96 m (6 ft 5 in)
- Weight: 114 kg (17 st 13 lb)
- University: University of Bath

Rugby union career
- Position: Lock/Flanker/Number 8
Senior career
| Years | Team | Apps | (Points) |
| 2015–2016 | London Scottish | 17 | (10) |
| 2016–2025 | Gloucester | 188 | (95) |
| 2025– | Newcastle Red Bulls | 0 | (0) |
- Correct as of 28 July 2020
International career
| Years | Team | Apps | (Points) |
| 2014–2015 | England Students | | |
National sevens team
| Years | Team | | Comps |
| 2014 | England | | |

Freddie Clarke (born 10 October 1992) is an English rugby union player who plays at flanker for Newcastle Red Bulls.

== Early career ==
During his early career, Clarke turned out for the University of Bath during which time they won the British Universities and Colleges Sport (BUCS) Rugby Sevens Championship for the first time. Clarke also played for Bath, helping their A-League side, Bath United, win the A-League title during the 2013–14 season.

Clarke was selected for the Great Britain Students team which won the World University Rugby Sevens Championships in Brazil. The success in South America earned him a call-up to the England Sevens squad which competed in the 2014 Sevens Grand Prix Series. He capped at England Students level six times and has captained the side as well.

== Professional career ==
On 2 June 2015, Clarke signed a one-year professional deal to join London Scottish in the RFU Championship during the 2015–16 season. In 2016, he left the Athletic Ground, Richmond to join Aviva Premiership side Gloucester Rugby as part of the academy squad during the 2016–17 season.

On 17 May 2017, Clarke signed a new one-year senior contract with Gloucester from the 2017–18 season.

in 2017–18, Clarke made 27 first team appearances. Improving from 9 games the previous season and becoming a first team regular. Again signing a new contract at the close of the season.

In June 2022, he was called up by Eddie Jones to join a training camp with the senior England squad.

On 2 August 2025, after 9 seasons at Gloucester, Clarke has left the club as he would join Premiership rivals Newcastle Red Bulls for the 2025–26 season.
