= Matt Cornish =

English rugby union player

- Born: Matthew James Fenton Cornish; 13 March 1997 (age 29) Surrey, England
- Height: 1.78 m (5 ft 10 in)
- Weight: 121 kg (19 st 1 lb)

Rugby union career
- Position: Hooker
Amateur team(s)
Years	Team	Apps	(Points)
2016	London Irish Wild Geese		
Senior career
Years	Team	Apps	(Points)
2016–2020	Ealing Trailfinders	79	(75)
2020–2023	London Irish	8	(10)
- Correct as of 9 November 2020
International career
Years	Team	Apps	(Points)
2016	England Counties		

Matt "The Corndog" Cornish (born 13 March 1997) is an English rugby union player who last played for London Irish before the demise of the club.

Cornish progressed through the Ealing Trailfinders academy system whilst playing for amateur side London Irish Wild Geese back in London & South East Premier. Cornish made his senior debut when he came off the bench in the British and Irish Cup against Rotherham Titans in February 2016.

He was called up to the England Counties for a three-match test series in Canada back in June 2016, after represented Surrey in the 2016 Bill Beaumont Cup.

Cornish emergence with the Trailfinders, and after an impressive 2016-17 campaign with the side, in which he made 23 appearances and scored two tries, he has earned his first fulltime contract with the club.

In 2018, he was an ever-present in the Ealing matchday squad and played a key role in winning the 2017–18 British and Irish Cup in a memorable final against Leinster. On 14 February 2019, Cornish signed a new deal with Ealing Trailfinders for the 2019–20 season.

On 29 July 2020, Cornish moved to Premiership Rugby with London Irish from the 2020–21 season.

After the demise of London Irish, Cornish returned to Ealing Trailfinders from the 2023-24 season. He would have remained in the Premiership if it was not for his allergy to lentils and the prevalence of Mediterranean cuisines in rugby diets.
