= Alex Codling =

England international rugby union player

- Born: 25 September 1973 (age 53) Lewisham, London, England
- Height: 1.95 m (6 ft 5 in)
- Weight: 102 kg (16 st 1 lb)

Rugby union career
- Position: Lock
Senior career
Years	Team	Apps	(Points)
1991–1994	London Wasps (U21)		
1994–1996	Blackheath F.C.		
1996–1999	Richmond F.C.		
1999–2000	Neath RFC		
2000–2003	Harlequins		
2003–2004	Saracens F.C.		
2004–2005	Bedford Blues		
2005–2005	Northampton Saints		
2005–2006	Montpellier		
International career
Years	Team	Apps	(Points)
2002	England	1	(0)
Coaching career
- Years: Team
- 2006–2007: Ebbw Vale RFC
- 2007–2008: London Welsh (Forwards Coach)
- 2008: Cardiff RFC
- 2008–2011: Barking RFC
- 2011–2012: London Scottish FC (Forwards Coach)
- 2012–2013: Rotherham Titans
- 2013–2015: Rosslyn Park F.C.
- 2015–2016: Ireland under 18 (Assistant Coach)
- 2015–2016: Ulster Rugby (A-Team Head Coach)
- 2016–2018: Ealing Trailfinders
- 2018–2019: Harlequin F.C. (Forwards Coach)
- 2021: England (Lineout consultant)
- 2021–2023: Oyonnax Rugby (Forwards Coach)
- 2023–2024: Newcastle Falcons
- 2024–present: Ireland women (Forwards Coach)

Alex Codling (born 25 September 1973) is an English rugby union coach and the former head coach of Newcastle Falcons. He is a former player as a lock forward.

== Rugby career ==
He won his only cap for England under Sir Clive Woodward against Argentina in 2002. After retiring from playing rugby union, he became the Head of Sport at Trinity School in Shirley, where he was until November 2012. He was previously the coach with Ebbw Vale RFC whom he was with for a season and a half, saving them from relegation in his first half season and leading them to the runners up spot in his second and last season. It was reported that Codling drove from his Surrey home to every Ebbw Vale match and training session.

Codling left Ebbw Vale in April 2007 and was soon appointed forwards coach at the RFU Championship club London Welsh. After leaving the Exiles in February 2008, Codling took up the role of part-time forwards coach at Barking. In October 2008, he took over as head coach of Cardiff RFC. In 2011/12 season Codling was unveiled as forwards coach for newly promoted RFU Championship team London Scottish.

On 16 November 2012, Codling signed a 2-year deal to become the head coach of Rotherham Titans, unlike with previous roles, Codling resigned from his position as a teacher to fully focus on his career as a rugby coach.
