= Ollie Fletcher (rugby union) =

English rugby player (born 2002)

- Born: 9 September 2002 (age 24)
- Height: 1.83 m (6 ft 0 in)
- Weight: 108 kg (238 lb; 17 st 0 lb)
- University: University of Newcastle
- Notable relative: John Fletcher

Rugby union career
- Position: Hooker
Senior career
Years	Team	Apps	(Points)
2022–	Newcastle Red Bulls	71	(40)
2023–2024	→ Doncaster Knights (loan)	1	(0)
- Correct as of 7 June 2026
International career
Years	Team	Apps	(Points)
2022	England U20s	4	(5)
- Correct as of 12 July 2022

Ollie Fletcher (born 9 September 2002) is an English professional rugby union footballer who plays as a hooker for Newcastle Red Bulls.

== Early life ==
He attended Newcastle School for Boys where he was the school’s captain for their first XV rugby union team. He later attended the University of Newcastle.

== Club career ==
Fletcher played club rugby for Tynedale RFC. He played for Newcastle Falcons at age-group levels prior to joining their senior academy in 2021. After making his Premiership Rugby debut, he signed a new two-year contract with Newcastle Falcons in April 2023. He made 24 league appearances during the 2024-25 season, scoring three tries. At the end of the season he extended his contract with the club.

== International career ==
Fletcher played for England U18 and later made his debut for England U20 in the last round of the 2022 Six Nations Under 20s Championship defeat against France. In 2024, he played rugby for England Students.

== Personal life ==
He is the son of Christine and John Fletcher, a former England A international and former Newcastle Falcons director of rugby. He had an older brother, Archie, and lived as a child in Northumberland.
