= 2024–25 Premiership Rugby =

Rugby union competition in England

- Countries: England
- Number of teams: 10
- Date: 20 September 2024 – 14 June 2025
- Champions: Bath (7th title)
- Runners-up: Leicester Tigers
- Matches played: 93
- Tries scored: 729 (average 7.8 per match)
- Top point scorer: Finn Russell, Bath (156)
- Top try scorer: Gabriel Ibitoye, Bristol (13); Ollie Hassell-Collins, Leicester (13)

Official website
- www.premiershiprugby.com

The 2024–25 Premiership Rugby is the 38th season of the top flight of English domestic rugby union competition. The season began on 20 September 2024 and finished on 14 June 2025.

The reigning champions entering the season are Northampton Saints, who claimed their second league title after winning the 2024 final. No team was promoted from the 2023–24 RFU Championship, as the champions, Ealing Trailfinders, were not able to meet the eligibility criteria required to enter the league.

== Teams ==
The competition features the same 10 teams from the 2023–24 season. For the third consecutive season, the top team in the Championship was ineligible for promotion to the Premiership, after 2023–24 Championship winners Ealing Trailfinders failed to meet the minimum standards criteria to join the competition.

=== Stadiums and locations ===
2024-25 Gallagher Premiership Teams

Club	Director of Rugby/ Head Coach	Captain	Stadium	Capacity	City/Area
Bath	(South Africa) Johann van Graan	(England) Ben Spencer	The Recreation Ground	14,509	Bath, Somerset
Bristol Bears	(Samoa) Pat Lam	(England) Fitz Harding	Ashton Gate^{1}	27,000	Bristol
Exeter Chiefs	(England) Rob Baxter^{2}	(Wales) Dafydd Jenkins	Sandy Park	15,600	Exeter, Devon
Gloucester	(England) George Skivington	(England) Lewis Ludlow	Kingsholm	16,115	Gloucester, Gloucestershire
Harlequins	(Australia) Billy Millard	(England) Alex Dombrandt	Twickenham Stoop^{3}	14,800	Twickenham, Greater London
Harlequins	(England) Danny Wilson	(England) Alex Dombrandt	Twickenham Stoop^{3}	14,800	Twickenham, Greater London
Leicester Tigers	(Australia) Michael Cheika	(Argentina) Julián Montoya	Welford Road	25,849	Leicester, Leicestershire
Newcastle Falcons	(England) Steve Diamond	(England) Callum Chick	Kingston Park	10,200	Newcastle upon Tyne, Tyne and Wear
Northampton Saints	(England) Phil Dowson	(England) George Furbank	Franklin's Gardens	15,249	Northampton, Northamptonshire
Northampton Saints	(England) Sam Vesty	(England) George Furbank	Franklin's Gardens	15,249	Northampton, Northamptonshire
Sale Sharks	(England) Alex Sanderson	(England) Ben Curry	Salford Community Stadium	12,000	Salford, Greater Manchester
Sale Sharks	(England) Paul Deacon	(England) Ben Curry	Salford Community Stadium	12,000	Salford, Greater Manchester
Saracens	(Ireland) Mark McCall	(England) Maro Itoje	StoneX Stadium^{4}	10,500	Hendon, Greater London
Saracens	(England) Joe Shaw	(England) Maro Itoje	StoneX Stadium^{4}	10,500	Hendon, Greater London

Notes

- ^1 – Bristol Bears will also play one home game at Principality Stadium, Cardiff in May 2025.
- ^2 – Ali Hepher was the head coach of Exeter Chiefs for the first 11 rounds of the season, before he was replaced by Rob Hunter in March 2025. Hunter then left the club by mutual consent in May 2025, and director of rugby Rob Baxter took over the head coach role for the remainder of the season.
- ^3 – Harlequins will also play two home games at Twickenham Stadium, London in December 2024 and May 2025.
- ^4 – Saracens will also play one home game at Tottenham Hotspur Stadium, London in March 2025.

== Table ==
Pos	Team	Pld	W	D	L	PF	PA	PD	TF	TA	TB	LB	Pts	Qualification
1	Bath (C)	18	14	0	4	651	417	+234	96	56	15	1	72	Champions Cup and play-offs
2	Leicester Tigers (RU)	18	11	1	6	533	439	+94	72	62	12	3	61	Champions Cup and play-offs
3	Sale Sharks (SF)	18	12	0	6	529	455	+74	69	61	10	0	58	Champions Cup and play-offs
4	Bristol Bears (SF)	18	10	0	8	635	580	+55	95	80	16	2	58	Champions Cup and play-offs
5	Gloucester	18	10	0	8	576	487	+89	86	72	13	3	56	Champions Cup
6	Saracens	18	10	0	8	522	482	+40	74	67	12	4	56	Champions Cup
7	Harlequins	18	8	1	9	438	478	−40	60	68	11	3	48	Champions Cup
8	Northampton Saints	18	8	0	10	488	515	−27	68	74	10	2	44	Champions Cup
9	Exeter Chiefs	18	4	0	14	403	528	−125	57	75	5	8	29	Challenge Cup
10	Newcastle Falcons	18	2	0	16	292	686	−394	39	101	3	2	13	Challenge Cup

Source: Premiership Rugby
Rules for classification: Tiebreakers for teams tied on points: 1) Number of matches won; 2) Difference between points for and against; 3) Total number of points for; 4) Aggregate number of points scored in matches between tied teams; 5) Number of matches won excluding the first match, then the second and so on until the tie is settled.

=== Round-by-round progression ===
The grid below shows each team's progression throughout the season, indicating their points total (and league table position) at the end of every round:

Team Progression
Team	R1	R2	R3	R4	R5	R6	R7	R8	R9	R10	R11	R12	R13	R14	R15	R16	R17	R18
Bath	5 (1st)	9 (2nd)	10 (4th)	15 (3rd)	20 (2nd)	25 (1st)	29 (1st)	34 (1st)	39 (1st)	41 (1st)	46 (1st)	51 (1st)	56 (1st)	61 (1st)	66 (1st)	66 (1st)	71 (1st)	72 (1st)
Leicester Tigers	4 (4th)	5 (6th)	10 (3rd)	14 (4th)	19 (3rd)	24 (2nd)	24 (3rd)	25 (4th)	28 (5th)	33 (4th)	35 (4th)	40 (3rd)	41 (3rd)	46 (2nd)	51 (2nd)	56 (2nd)	56 (2nd)	61 (2nd)
Sale Sharks	4 (5th)	4 (8th)	9 (6th)	14 (5th)	14 (6th)	14 (8th)	19 (6th)	24 (5th)	29 (3rd)	29 (6th)	29 (6th)	34 (6th)	39 (5th)	44 (4th)	48 (3rd)	49 (4th)	54 (3rd)	58 (3rd)
Bristol Bears	5 (2nd)	7 (3rd)	12 (2nd)	17 (1st)	19 (4th)	24 (3rd)	29 (2nd)	34 (2nd)	34 (2nd)	35 (2nd)	40 (2nd)	45 (2nd)	46 (2nd)	46 (3rd)	47 (4th)	52 (3rd)	53 (4th)	58 (4th)
Gloucester	1 (8th)	6 (5th)	8 (8th)	9 (8th)	11 (8th)	16 (6th)	20 (5th)	24 (6th)	25 (6th)	30 (5th)	35 (3rd)	36 (5th)	41 (4th)	41 (6th)	46 (5th)	46 (6th)	51 (5th)	56 (5th)
Saracens	5 (3rd)	10 (1st)	15 (1st)	16 (2nd)	21 (1st)	23 (4th)	24 (4th)	29 (3rd)	29 (4th)	34 (3rd)	34 (5th)	34 (7th)	39 (6th)	44 (5th)	44 (6th)	49 (5th)	51 (6th)	56 (6th)
Harlequins	1 (6th)	6 (4th)	8 (7th)	12 (6th)	13 (7th)	18 (5th)	19 (7th)	19 (7th)	22 (7th)	27 (7th)	32 (6th)	36 (4th)	37 (7th)	38 (7th)	38 (8th)	43 (7th)	47 (7th)	48 (7th)
Northampton Saints	0 (10th)	4 (7th)	9 (5th)	9 (7th)	14 (5th)	14 (7th)	14 (8th)	15 (8th)	20 (8th)	25 (8th)	26 (8th)	26 (8th)	28 (8th)	33 (8th)	38 (7th)	38 (8th)	43 (8th)	44 (8th)
Exeter Chiefs	1 (7th)	2 (9th)	2 (9th)	4 (9th)	5 (9th)	5 (9th)	6 (10th)	6 (10th)	10 (9th)	10 (9th)	15 (9th)	16 (9th)	20 (9th)	21 (9th)	21 (9th)	26 (9th)	27 (9th)	29 (9th)
Newcastle Falcons	0 (9th)	0 (10th)	0 (10th)	0 (10th)	4 (10th)	4 (10th)	8 (9th)	8 (9th)	8 (10th)	8 (10th)	9 (10th)	9 (10th)	10 (10th)	12 (10th)	12 (10th)	13 (10th)	13 (10th)	13 (10th)
Key:	Win	Draw	Loss															

== Regular season ==
The regular season fixtures were announced on 23 July 2024.

Highlights of the season include:

- Derby Weekends – All fixtures scheduled for Round 4 and Round 12 are derby matches between local rivals – the Northern Derby (Newcastle Falcons v Sale Sharks), the West Country Derbies (Bath v Gloucester and Bristol Bears v Exeter Chiefs), the East Midlands Derby (Leicester Tigers v Northampton Saints), and the London Derby (Harlequins v Saracens).
- Slater Cup – Leicester Tigers and Gloucester will contest the Slater Cup at Welford Road on 20 October 2024, and at Kingsholm on 25 January 2025, in honour of former Leicester and Gloucester player Ed Slater.
- Big Game 16 – Harlequins will host Leicester Tigers in this season's edition of The Big Game at Allianz Stadium on 28 December 2024, during Round 9.
- The Showdown 5 – Saracens will host Harlequins in this season's edition of The Showdown at Tottenham Hotspur Stadium on 22 March 2025, during Round 12.
- Big Summer Kick-Off 4 – Harlequins will host Gloucester in this season's edition of the Big Summer Kick-Off at Allianz Stadium in May 2025, during Round 16.
- Big Day Out – Bristol Bears will host Bath in the inaugural edition of the Big Day Out at Principality Stadium in May 2025, during Round 16.

Notes

- All fixtures are subject to change.
- Referees appointed to officiate Premiership matches are employed by the RFU, unless indicated otherwise.

=== Results ===
Home \ Away	BAT	BRI	EXE	GLO	HAR	LEI	NEW	NOR	SAL	SAR
Bath	—	26–36	19–15	42–26	47–28	43–15	55–19	38–16	40–13	68–10
Bristol Bears	36–14	—	52–38	41–44	52–26	19–36	55–35	31–23	0–38	35–37
Exeter Chiefs	24–26	35–40	—	22–15	19–36	14–17	17–15	42–14	26–30	31–22
Gloucester	31–55	53–28	79–17	—	14–0	38–31	36–7	41–26	36–20	26–35
Harlequins	24–26	24–48	24–22	38–19	—	34–34	28–14	22–19	29–43	17–10
Leicester Tigers	15–20	24–54	28–15	29–26	40–7	—	42–20	24–8	44–34	22–29
Newcastle Falcons	15–40	3–24	24–18	12–26	14–38	10–42	—	34–35	15–39	17–12
Northampton Saints	35–34	48–31	30–24	17–25	33–29	0–33	61–0	—	47–17	28–24
Sale Sharks	23–32	41–27	28–10	31–27	12–11	39–25	43–10	27–24	—	25–7
Saracens	36–26	35–26	29–14	36–14	12–23	29–32	75–28	39–24	45–26	—

Updated to match(es) played on 31 May 2025. Source: Premiership Rugby
Legend: Blue = home team win; Yellow = draw; Red = away team win.

=== Round 1 ===
20 September 2024
19:45

(1 BP) Bath	38–16	Northampton Saints
Try: Cokanasiga 5' c Hill 26' c B. Spencer 34' c Lawrence 62' c Coetzee 77' c Con: Russell (5/5) 6', 27', 35', 63', 79'; Pen: Russell (1/2) 67'	Report	Try: Kemeny 18' c Con: F. Smith (1/1) 19'; Pen: F. Smith (3/4) 32', 53', 61'

The Recreation Ground
Attendance: 12,959
Referee: Luke Pearce

20 September 2024
19:45

Newcastle Falcons	3–24	Bristol Bears (1 BP)
Pen: Connon (1/1) 40'	Report	Try: J. Williams 5' m Naulago 48' c Malins (2) 63' c, 76' m Con: MacGinty (2/4) 50', 64'

Kingston Park
Attendance: 5,116
Referee: Anthony Woodthorpe

21 September 2024
15:05

(1 BP) Exeter Chiefs	14–17	Leicester Tigers
Try: Fisilau 47' c Cairns 57' c Con: Hodge (2/2) 49', 58'	Report	Try: Liebenberg 63' c Reffell 80+1' c Con: Shillcock (1/1) 64'; Volavola (1/1) 80+2'; Drop: Shillcock (1/1) 40'

Sandy Park
Attendance: 9,755
Referee: Tom Foley

21 September 2024
17:30

(1 BP) Gloucester	26–35	Saracens (1 BP)
Try: F. Thomas 40' c Clarke 56' m Clement 71' c Blake 77' c Con: Barton (3/4) 40+2', 72', 77'	Report	Try: Segun 16' m van Zyl 23' c Elliott 34' m Onyeama-Christie (2) 41' c, 60' m Con: Burke (2/5) 25', 43'; Pen: Burke (2/2) 53', 64'

Kingsholm
Attendance: 11,148
Referee: Craig Maxwell-Keys

22 September 2024
15:00

Sale Sharks	12–11	Harlequins (1 BP)
Pen: Ford (4/4) 17', 28', 41', 74'	Report	Try: Walker 32' m Pen: Halfpenny (2/2) 38', 70'

Salford Community Stadium
Attendance: 7,754
Referee: Adam Leal

=== Round 2 ===
27 September 2024
19:45

(2 BP) Bristol Bears	41–44	Gloucester (1 BP)
Try: Ibitoye 1' c Naulago 39' m Randall 49' c Malins (2) 64' c, 68' c Lane 72' m Con: MacGinty (4/6) 2', 50', 65', 69'; Pen: MacGinty (1/1) 28'	Report	Try: Wade (3) 6' c, 33' c, 60' c F. Thomas 18' c Anscombe 22' c Con: Barton (5/5) 7', 19', 23', 35', 62'; Pen: Barton (3/3) 42', 53', 77'

Ashton Gate
Attendance: 17,109
Referee: Tom Foley

28 September 2024
15:00

(1 BP) Harlequins	28–14	Newcastle Falcons
Try: Jibulu 14' c W. Evans 23' c Halfpenny 31' c Porter 41' c Con: M. Smith (4/4) 16', 24', 33', 42'	Report	Try: Hawkins 4' c Redshaw 63' c Con: Grayson (2/2) 5', 65'

Twickenham Stoop
Attendance: 12,258
Referee: Luke Pearce

28 September 2024
15:05

(1 BP) Saracens	45–26	Sale Sharks
Try: Elliott 52' c Daly (2) 63' m, 80+5' c George 70' m Con: Lozowski (2/4) 53', 80+6'; Pen: Lozowski (6/7) 10', 27', 36', 43', 46', 73'; Daly (1/1) 24'	Report	Try: Warr 20' c Cowan-Dickie 61' m O'Flaherty 79' m Con: R. du Preez (1/3) 21'; Pen: Ford (1/2) 2'; R. du Preez (2/2) 40+3', 55'

StoneX Stadium
Attendance: 8,660
Referee: Anthony Woodthorpe

28 September 2024
17:30

Northampton Saints	30–24	Exeter Chiefs (1 BP)
Try: Coles 8' c Munga 44' c Hutchinson 48' c Con: F. Smith (3/3) 9', 45', 49'; Pen: F. Smith (2/2) 12', 28'; Drop: F. Smith (1/1) 59'	Report	Try: Woodburn 35' c Feyi-Waboso (2) 68' c, 76' c Con: Hodge (3/3) 36', 69', 77'; Pen: Hodge (1/1) 42'

Franklin's Gardens
Attendance: 15,153
Referee: Adam Leal

29 September 2024
15:00

(1 BP) Leicester Tigers	15–20	Bath
Try: van Poortvliet 33' c Cronin 78' m Con: Shillcock (1/1) 34'; Pen: Shillcock (1/1) 20'	Report	Try: Muir 21' m de Glanville 46' m G. Pepper 63' c Con: Russell (1/3) 64'; Pen: B. Spencer (1/1) 74'

Welford Road
Attendance: 17,898
Referee: Craig Maxwell-Keys

=== Round 3 ===
4 October 2024
19:45

(1 BP) Northampton Saints	33–29	Harlequins (2 BP)
Try: Iyogun 4' c Sleightholme (2) 22' c, 62' m Penalty try 42'; Graham 55' c Con: F. Smith (3/4) 5', 23', 56'	Report	Try: Walker 1' c M. Smith (2) 19' c, 25' m Porter 72' c Con: M. Smith (3/4) 2', 20', 73'; Pen: M. Smith (1/1) 30'

Franklin's Gardens
Attendance: 15,153
Referee: Matthew Carley

4 October 2024
19:45

(1 BP) Sale Sharks	31–27	Gloucester (2 BP)
Try: Roebuck (2) 17' c, 47' m Warr 36' c Cowan-Dickie (2) 62' m, 71' c Con: R. du Preez (3/5) 18', 37', 72'	Report	Try: T. Williams (2) 6' m, 57' c Englefield 74' m Llewellyn 78' c Con: Barton (2/4) 58', 79'; Pen: Barton (1/1) 39'

Salford Community Stadium
Attendance: 6,264
Referee: Luke Pearce

5 October 2024
15:05

(1 BP) Bath	26–36	Bristol Bears (1 BP)
Try: S. Harris 11' c Butt 55' c Molony 58' c Lawrence 75' m Con: Russell (3/4) 12', 56', 59'	Report	Try: Malins 1' c S. Grondona (2) 18' c, 36' c Janse van Rensburg 26' m Oghre 62' c Con: MacGinty (4/5) 2', 19', 37', 63'; Pen: MacGinty (1/1) 42'

The Recreation Ground
Attendance: 14,509
Referee: Christophe Ridley

5 October 2024
17:30

Newcastle Falcons	10–42	Leicester Tigers (1 BP)
Try: Chick 51' c Con: Grayson (1/1) 52'; Pen: Grayson (1/2) 7'	Report	Try: Hassell-Collins 17' c Watson 23' m Ilione 40' m Steward 42' m Martin 56' c Wand 69' m Liebenberg 73' m Con: Shillcock (2/6) 18', 57'; Pen: Shillcock (1/2) 3'

Kingston Park
Attendance: 6,161
Referee: Jack Makepeace

6 October 2024
15:00

(1 BP) Saracens	29–14	Exeter Chiefs
Try: George 17' m Elliott 22' c Earl (2) 31' c, 41' m Burke 37' m Con: Lozowski (2/5) 23', 32'	Report	Try: Hodge (2) 35' c, 61' c Con: Hodge (2/2) 36', 62'

StoneX Stadium
Attendance: 8,481
Referee: Karl Dickson

=== Round 4 ===
11 October 2024
19:45

(1 BP) Sale Sharks	43–10	Newcastle Falcons
Try: Reed (2) 4' c, 21' c Penalty try 29'; Addison 35' c Roebuck (2) 44' c, 71' m Con: R. du Preez (4/4) 5', 22', 36', 45'; Pen: Curtis (1/1) 54'	Report	Try: Chick 49' c Con: Grayson (1/1) 50'; Pen: Grayson (1/1) 14'

Salford Community Stadium
Attendance: 6,227
Referee: Karl Dickson

12 October 2024
15:00

(2 BP) Exeter Chiefs	35–40	Bristol Bears (1 BP)
Try: Brown-Bampoe (2) 18' m, 56' c Feyi-Waboso (2) 38' c, 61' c Con: Hodge (3/4) 40', 57', 62'; Pen: Hodge (3/3) 9', 43', 74'	Report	Try: Marmion 11' m Batley 27' c Oghre 66' c Ibitoye (3) 68' c, 70' c, 76' c Con: MacGinty (5/6) 28', 67', 69', 71', 77'

Sandy Park
Attendance: 11,643
Referee: Matthew Carley

12 October 2024
15:05

(1 BP) Gloucester	31–55	Bath (1 BP)
Try: Llewellyn 7' c T. Williams 20' c C. Atkinson 23' c Thorley 68' c Con: Carreras (3/3) 9', 21', 24'; Barton (1/1) 69'; Pen: Carreras (1/1) 40'	Report	Try: Obano (2) 4' c, 43' c Russell 26' c Penalty try 46'; Bayliss 53' m de Glanville 64' m Lawrence 70' c Coetzee 77' c Con: Russell (5/7) 6', 27', 44', 72', 79'; Pen: Russell (1/1) 11'

Kingsholm
Attendance: 16,112
Referee: Adam Leal

12 October 2024
17:30

Leicester Tigers	24–8	Northampton Saints
Try: Steward 2' c Cracknell 53' c Chessum 61' c Con: Pollard (3/3) 3', 54', 62'; Pen: Pollard (1/1) 21'	Report	Try: Freeman 80' m Pen: F. Smith (1/1) 36'

Welford Road
Attendance: 23,548
Referee: Anthony Woodthorpe

13 October 2024
15:00

Harlequins	17–10	Saracens (1 BP)
Try: Baxter 26' c Anyanwu 52' c Con: M. Smith (2/2) 27', 53'; Pen: M. Smith (1/1) 70'	Report	Try: Tizard 48' c Con: Lozowski (1/1) 49'; Pen: Lozowski (1/2) 74'

Twickenham Stoop
Attendance: 12,919
Referee: Christophe Ridley

=== Round 5 ===
18 October 2024
19:45

Newcastle Falcons	24–18	Exeter Chiefs (1 BP)
Try: van der Walt 17' c Blamire (2) 29' c, 55' c Con: Grayson (3/3) 18', 30', 56'; Drop: Grayson (1/1) 68'	Report	Try: Feyi-Waboso 3' m Hodge 77' c Con: Hodge (1/2) 78'; Pen: Hodge (2/3) 21', 24'

Kingston Park
Attendance: 4,464
Referee: Luke Pearce

18 October 2024
19:45

(1 BP) Northampton Saints	47–17	Sale Sharks
Try: Freeman 3' m Furbank 7' c Sleightholme (2) 20' c, 26' c T. James 23' c Hendy 36' c Ramm 60' c Con: F. Smith (6/7) 8', 21', 24', 27', 37', 61'	Report	Try: Cowan-Dickie 12' c Carpenter 45' c Con: R. du Preez (2/2) 13', 46'; Pen: R. du Preez (1/1) 1'

Franklin's Gardens
Attendance: 14,220
Referee: Christophe Ridley

19 October 2024
15:05

(2 BP) Bristol Bears	35–37	Saracens (1 BP)
Try: Harding (3) 1' m, 36' c, 41' c Randall 18' m Fricker 43' m Con: MacGinty (2/5) 37', 42'; Pen: MacGinty (2/2) 10', 59'	Report	Try: T. Knight 15' c Segun 24' c Daly (2) 45' c, 71' c Con: Lozowski (4/4) 16', 25', 47', 73'; Pen: Lozowski (3/3) 39', 52', 80+2'

Ashton Gate
Referee: Anthony Woodthorpe

19 October 2024
17:30

(1 BP) Harlequins	24–26	Bath (1 BP)
Try: Dombrandt 6' c Isgró (2) 16' c, 37' c Con: M. Smith (3/3) 7', 17', 39'; Pen: M. Smith (1/1) 61'	Report	Try: G. Pepper 25' c de Glanville 33' c du Toit 63' c van Wyk 77' m Con: Russell (3/4) 26', 34', 64'

Twickenham Stoop
Referee: Tom Foley

20 October 2024
15:00

(1 BP) Leicester Tigers	29–26	Gloucester (2 BP)
Try: Hassell-Collins 21' m Pollard 42' c Bassett 48' c Kelly 65' c Con: Pollard (3/4) 43', 49', 66'; Pen: Pollard (1/1) 5'	Report	Try: Llewellyn (3) 9' c, 37' m, 71' c F. Thomas 12' c Con: Carreras (3/4) 10', 13', 72'

Welford Road
Referee: Hamish Smales

=== Round 6 ===
25 October 2024
19:45

(1 BP) Bristol Bears	31–23	Northampton Saints
Try: Ibitoye 29' c Ravouvou (2) 32' c, 55' c Batley 68' c Con: MacGinty (4/4) 30', 33', 56', 70'; Pen: MacGinty (1/1) 67'	Report	Try: Hendy 17' c Kemeny 19' m Ramm 79' m Con: Makepeace-Cubitt (1/3) 18'; Pen: Makepeace-Cubitt (2/2) 14', 40'

Ashton Gate
Attendance: 14,949
Referee: Craig Maxwell-Keys

26 October 2024
15:00

(1 BP) Gloucester	36–7	Newcastle Falcons
Try: Clement 2' m T. Williams 12' c Blake 20' c Singleton 40+1' m Wade 72' m Hathaway 75' m Con: Anscombe (3/4) 13', 21', 40+2'	Report	Try: Blamire 68' c Con: Connon (1/1) 70'

Kingsholm
Attendance: 10,604
Referee: Ian Tempest

26 October 2024
15:05

(1 BP) Bath	40–13	Sale Sharks
Try: Muir 1' c Reid 18' c du Toit 26' c Hill 45' c Carr-Smith 62' c van Wyk 76' m Con: Russell (5/6) 2', 19', 27', 46', 63'	Report	Try: Addison 55' c Con: R. du Preez (1/1) 55'; Pen: R. du Preez (2/2) 12', 23'

The Recreation Ground
Attendance: 14,509
Referee: Karl Dickson

26 October 2024
17:30

(2 BP) Saracens	29–32	Leicester Tigers (1 BP)
Try: Tompkins 17' c Swiel 26' c González 65' m Hadfield 70' c Con: Swiel (3/4) 17', 27', 71'; Pen: Swiel (1/1) 37'	Report	Try: Hassell-Collins 19' c Perese 23' m Penalty try 40+1'; Montoya 46' c Con: Pollard (2/3) 20', 47'; Pen: Pollard (2/2) 13', 57'

StoneX Stadium
Attendance: 10,000
Referee: Matthew Carley

27 October 2024
15:00

Exeter Chiefs	19–36	Harlequins (1 BP)
Try: Vintcent 16' c Rigg 34' c Hammersley 56' m Con: Slade (2/2) 18', 35'	Report	Try: Beard 13' m Isgró 20' c W. Evans (2) 24' c, 53' c Murley 78' c Con: J. Evans (4/5) 21', 25', 54', 79'; Pen: J. Evans (1/1) 65'

Sandy Park
Attendance: 12,054
Referee: Adam Leal

=== Round 7 ===
29 November 2024
19:45

(1 BP) Harlequins	24–48	Bristol Bears (1 BP)
Try: Dombrandt 3' m Murley 21' c Northmore 26' m T. Green 63' c Con: J. Evans (2/4) 22', 64'	Report	Try: Ravouvou 12' c Ibitoye 16' c Marmion 39' c Mata 43' c Janse van Rensburg 51' c S. Grondona 55' c Con: MacGinty (6/6) 13', 17', 40', 44', 52', 56'; Pen: MacGinty (2/2) 47', 72'

Twickenham Stoop
Attendance: 12,935
Referee: Luke Pearce

29 November 2024
19:45

Newcastle Falcons	17–12	Saracens (1 BP)
Try: Hearle 22' c Radwan 33' c Con: Connon (2/2) 23', 34'; Pen: Connon (1/3) 2'	Report	Try: Elliott 17' m Willis 77' c Con: Burke (1/1) 78'

Kingston Park
Attendance: 6,187
Referee: Matthew Carley

30 November 2024
15:00

Northampton Saints	17–25	Gloucester
Try: Furbank 4' c Augustus 47' c Con: Hutchinson (2/2) 5', 48'; Pen: Hutchinson (1/2) 74'	Report	Try: Carreras (2) 2' m, 31' c Mercer 23' c Con: Carreras (2/2) 24', 32'; Pen: Carreras (2/2) 40+1', 77'

Franklin's Gardens
Attendance: 15,153
Referee: Anthony Woodthorpe

30 November 2024
17:45

Bath	19–15	Exeter Chiefs (1 BP)
Try: G. Pepper 6' c Reid 44' m Annett 66' c Con: Russell (2/3) 7', 68'	Report	Try: Vermeulen 19' m Fisilau 80+1' c Con: Slade (1/2) 80+3'; Pen: Slade (1/1) 40'

The Recreation Ground
Attendance: 14,509
Referee: Sara Cox

1 December 2024
15:00

(1 BP) Sale Sharks	39–25	Leicester Tigers
Try: D. du Preez 22' m Rodd 31' c Reed (2) 41' m, 46' m Opoku-Fordjour 50' c Cowan-Dickie 65' c Con: R. du Preez (3/5) 32', 51', 66'; Pen: R. du Preez (1/1) 71'	Report	Try: N. Smith 11' m Steward 56' c Martin 78' c Con: Pollard (1/2) 57'; Shillcock (1/1) 79'; Pen: Pollard (2/2) 18', 24'

Salford Community Stadium
Attendance: 8,125
Referee: Adam Leal

=== Round 8 ===
20 December 2024
19:45

Gloucester	14–0	Harlequins
Try: Hathaway 11' c Clement 28' c Con: Carreras (2/2) 12', 29'	Report

Kingsholm
Referee: Christophe Ridley

21 December 2024
15:05

(1 BP) Leicester Tigers	24–54	Bristol Bears (1 BP)
Try: Hassell-Collins (2) 7' m, 16' c Steward 49' c Bassett 80+3' m Con: Pollard (2/3) 17', 50'	Report	Try: Oghre (2) 9' c, 14' c Ravouvou (2) 19' c, 72' c Mata 28' c Lane 35' c Ibitoye 40+1' m Janse van Rensburg 59' c Con: MacGinty (3/3) 10', 15', 20'; Worsley (4/5) 29', 36', 60', 73'

Welford Road
Referee: Hamish Smales

21 December 2024
17:30

Newcastle Falcons	15–40	Bath (1 BP)
Try: Blamire 1' m Lockwood 7' c Con: Connon (1/2) 8'; Pen: Connon (1/1) 26'	Report	Try: Barbeary 3' c de Glanville 21' c W. Stuart 40+1' c Ewels 47' c Russell 66' c Underhill 79' m Con: Russell (5/5) 4', 22', 40+2', 48', 67'

Kingston Park
Attendance: 6,757
Referee: Ian Tempest

21 December 2024
17:30

(1 BP) Sale Sharks	28–10	Exeter Chiefs
Try: L. James 21' c Carpenter 37' c Penalty try 49'; Hill 70' c Con: R. du Preez (3/3) 22', 38', 71'	Report	Try: J. Roots 62' c Con: Slade (1/1) 63'; Pen: Slade (1/2) 6'

Salford Community Stadium
Referee: Anthony Woodthorpe

22 December 2024
15:00

(1 BP) Saracens	39–24	Northampton Saints (1 BP)
Try: Burke (2) 11' c, 37' c Carré 24' m Dan 29' m George 58' m Earl 61' c Con: Burke (3/6) 12', 38', 62'; Pen: Burke (1/1) 80'	Report	Try: Freeman 43' c T. Pearson 49' m Sleightholme 75' m McParland 77' c Con: F. Smith (2/4) 44', 78'

StoneX Stadium
Attendance: 10,000
Referee: Adam Leal

=== Round 9 ===
27 December 2024
19:45

Bristol Bears	0–38	Sale Sharks (1 BP)
	Report	Try: Quirke 2' c Roebuck 23' c B. Curry 48' c O'Flaherty 65' m Con: R. du Preez (3/4) 3', 24', 49'; Pen: R. du Preez (3/3) 7', 41', 60'; Drop: Ford (1/1) 38'

Ashton Gate
Referee: Adam Leal

28 December 2024
12:45

(1 BP) Bath	68–10	Saracens
Try: Penalty try 3' du Toit 14' c Redpath 23' c Muir (3) 36' c, 55' c, 78' c Cokanasiga (2) 45' m, 75' c Underhill 61' c Lawrence 71' c Con: Russell (8/9) 15', 24', 37', 57', 63', 72', 76', 79'	Report	Try: Pifeleti 66' c Con: Burke (1/1) 67'; Pen: Burke (1/1) 19'

The Recreation Ground
Referee: Karl Dickson

28 December 2024
15:00

(1 BP) Northampton Saints	61–0	Newcastle Falcons
Try: Coles 4' c Davison (2) 7' c, 9' c Mitchell 14' c Kemeny 28' c Freeman 36' m T. Pearson (2) 51' c, 54' c Hutchinson 80' c Con: F. Smith (6/7) 5', 8', 10', 15', 29', 52'; Hutchinson (2/2) 56', 80+1'	Report

Franklin's Gardens
Attendance: 15,249
Referee: Luke Pearce

28 December 2024
18:00

(1 BP) Harlequins	34–34	Leicester Tigers (1 BP)
Try: Walker 4' c Murley (2) 25' c, 68' c Northmore 38' c Con: M. Smith (4/4) 6', 26', 39', 70'; Pen: M. Smith (2/2) 50', 62'	Report	Try: Hassell-Collins 12' c Kata 21' c Steward 54' c Cole 78' c Con: Pollard (4/4) 13', 22', 55', 79'; Pen: Pollard (2/2) 3', 29'

Allianz Stadium
Referee: Matthew Carley

29 December 2024
15:00

Exeter Chiefs	22–15	Gloucester (1 BP)
Try: Frost 1' c Tua 17' c Iosefa-Scott 73' m Con: Slade (2/3) 3', 18'; Pen: Slade (1/2) 64'	Report	Try: Anscombe 44' c Ford-Robinson 62' m Con: S. Carreras (1/2) 45'; Pen: S. Carreras (1/2) 10'

Sandy Park
Referee: Ian Tempest

=== Round 10 ===
3 January 2025
19:45

Newcastle Falcons	14–38	Harlequins (1 BP)
Try: Radwan 32' c Redshaw 66' c Con: Connon (2/2) 33', 67'	Report	Try: Chisholm 9' c M. Smith 36' c Walker 70' c Beard 75' c Riley 80' c Con: M. Smith (5/5) 10', 37', 71', 76', 80+1'; Pen: M. Smith (1/1) 45'

Kingston Park
Attendance: 7,115
Referee: Sara Cox

4 January 2025
15:00

(1 BP) Gloucester	36–20	Sale Sharks
Try: Carreras 5' m Llewellyn (2) 20' c, 59' c Hathaway 25' c T. Williams 75' c Con: Carreras (4/5) 21', 26', 61', 75'; Pen: Carreras (1/1) 14'	Report	Try: B. Curry 40' c Cowan-Dickie 56' m Roebuck 63' m Con: R. du Preez (1/3) 40+1'; Pen: R. du Preez (1/1) 18'

Kingsholm
Referee: Jack Makepeace

4 January 2025
15:05

(1 BP) Leicester Tigers	28–15	Exeter Chiefs
Try: Cracknell 13' c Henderson 31' c Hassell-Collins 67' c Youngs 76' c Con: Pollard (4/4) 14', 32', 68', 77'	Report	Try: Wyatt (2) 42' m, 57' c Con: Hodge (1/1) 59'; Pen: Slade (1/1) 3'

Welford Road
Referee: Christophe Ridley

4 January 2025
17:30

(1 BP) Saracens	35–26	Bristol Bears (1 BP)
Try: Willis (2) 6' c, 39' m Burke (2) 16' c, 77' m Cinti 47' m Con: Lozowski (2/5) 8', 17'; Pen: Daly (1/1) 33'; Lozowski (1/2) 70'	Report	Try: Randall 20' c Ravouvou 61' c Thacker 73' c Heenan 80+1' m Con: Worsley (1/1) 21'; Byrne (2/3) 62', 74'

StoneX Stadium
Referee: Matthew Carley

5 January 2025
15:00

(1 BP) Northampton Saints	35–34	Bath (2 BP)
Try: Kemeny 1' c Dingwall 9' m Ramm 12' c Hendy 28' c Con: F. Smith (3/4) 2', 13', 29'; Pen: F. Smith (3/5) 49', 71', 80'	Report	Try: Cokanasiga (2) 15' m, 63' m O. Bailey 25' c W. Stuart 45' c Ojomoh 54' c Con: Russell (3/5) 26', 46', 55'; Pen: Russell (1/1) 76'

Franklin's Gardens
Attendance: 15,153
Referee: Anthony Woodthorpe

=== Round 11 ===
24 January 2025
19:45

(1 BP) Harlequins	22–19	Northampton Saints (1 BP)
Try: Cleaves (2) 25' m, 76' m Lawday 38' m Joseph 50' c Con: J. Evans (1/4) 51'	Report	Try: T. Pearson 10' c Haffar 28' c Seabrook 46' m Con: Makepeace-Cubitt (2/3) 11', 29'

Twickenham Stoop
Attendance: 13,800
Referee: Luke Pearce

25 January 2025
15:05

(1 BP) Gloucester	38–31	Leicester Tigers (2 BP)
Try: T. Williams 12' c Carreras 28' c Clement 51' c C. Harris 55' c Blake 59' c Con: Carreras (5/5) 12', 29', 52', 56', 60'; Pen: Carreras (1/1) 40+1'	Report	Try: Perese 8' c Brown 19' c Radwan 38' c Wells 42' c Con: Pollard (4/4) 9', 20', 39', 43'; Pen: Pollard (1/1) 77'

Kingsholm
Referee: Ben O'Keeffe (New Zealand)

25 January 2025
17:30

(1 BP) Exeter Chiefs	31–22	Saracens
Try: Innard 9' m Rigg 50' m Wyatt 63' c Roots 65' c Frost 72' c Con: Skinner (3/4) 64', 66', 73'	Report	Try: Elliott (2) 25' m, 59' c Mawi 80' c Con: Lozowski (2/3) 60', 80+1'; Pen: Lozowski (1/1) 2'

Sandy Park
Attendance: 11,236
Referee: Ian Tempest

26 January 2025
15:00

(1 BP) Bristol Bears	55–35	Newcastle Falcons (1 BP)
Try: Oghre 4' c Heward (2) 6' c, 80' c Ravouvou (2) 17' c, 49' c Mata 70' m Marmion 73' c D. Bailey 75' m Con: Byrne (4/4) 5', 7', 18', 50'; Janse van Rensburg (2/4) 74', 80+1'; Pen: Byrne (1/1) 59'	Report	Try: Chick 30' c Blamire 35' c M. Clark 53' c Stevenson (2) 61' c, 77' c Con: Connon (5/5) 31', 36', 53', 62', 78'

Ashton Gate
Referee: Craig Maxwell-Keys

26 January 2025
15:00

Sale Sharks	23–32	Bath (1 BP)
Try: Reed 17' m R. du Preez 27' m Carpenter 78' c Con: R. du Preez (1/3) 79'; Pen: R. du Preez (2/3) 22', 38'	Report	Try: McConnochie (2) 24' m, 42' c Ojomoh 53' m Carr-Smith 73' c Con: Russell (3/4) 40+3', 54', 74'; Pen: Russell (2/2) 61', 80+1'

Salford Community Stadium
Referee: Karl Dickson

=== Round 12 ===
21 March 2025
19:45

Newcastle Falcons	15–39	Sale Sharks (1 BP)
Try: Neild 21' c Palframan 79' m Con: Connon (1/1) 22'; Pen: Connon (1/2) 32'	Report	Try: Rodd 9' c R. du Preez 30' c O'Flaherty 40' c McElroy 51' c Carpenter 68' m Con: Ford (4/5) 10', 31', 40+1', 52'; Pen: Ford (2/2) 3', 37'

Kingston Park
Attendance: 5,402
Referee: Christophe Ridley

21 March 2025
19:45

Northampton Saints	0–33	Leicester Tigers (1 BP)
	Report	Try: Radwan 3' m van Poortvliet 9' c Cracknell 12' m Clare 74' c Con: Pollard (2/4) 10', 75'; Pen: Pollard (3/3) 27', 30', 48'

Franklin's Gardens
Attendance: 15,123
Referee: Anthony Woodthorpe

22 March 2025
15:05

Saracens	12–23	Harlequins
Try: McFarland 4' c Elliott 38' m Con: Lozowski (1/2) 5'	Report	Try: Waghorn 59' c Porter 78' c Con: Benson (2/2) 60', 79'; Pen: Benson (3/3) 67', 70', 76'

Tottenham Hotspur Stadium
Referee: Adam Leal

22 March 2025
17:30

(1 BP) Bristol Bears	52–38	Exeter Chiefs (1 BP)
Try: Bates (3) 1' c, 27' c, 56' m J. Williams (2) 6' m, 15' c Janse van Rensburg 10' c Randall 40+2' c Luatua 46' c Con: Byrne (6/8) 2', 11', 16', 28', 40+3', 47'	Report	Try: Moloney 5' c Slade 8' m Jenkins 18' c Hodge 29' m Yeandle 65' c Rigg 73' c Con: Slade (1/2) 6'; Hodge (3/4) 19', 66', 74'

Ashton Gate
Referee: Karl Dickson

23 March 2025
15:00

(1 BP) Bath	42–26	Gloucester (1 BP)
Try: G. Pepper 6' c Ojomoh 17' c du Toit 23' c Russell 35' c W. Stuart 61' c Underhill 71' c Con: Russell (6/6) 7', 18', 24', 36', 62', 72'	Report	Try: Clement 9' c T. Williams 30' m Blake 31' c Barton 40+1' c Con: Carreras (3/4) 10', 32', 40+2'

The Recreation Ground
Referee: Sara Cox

=== Round 13 ===
28 March 2025
19:45

(1 BP) Sale Sharks	27–24	Northampton Saints (2 BP)
Try: O'Flaherty 9' m Roebuck (2) 16' c, 21' m Rodd 47' c Con: Ford (2/4) 17', 48'; Pen: Ford (1/1) 65'	Report	Try: Iyogun 18' m Freeman 29' c Pollock 41' m Dingwall 75' c Con: Mitchell (2/4) 30', 76'

Salford Community Stadium
Attendance: 7,718
Referee: Hamish Smales

29 March 2025
15:00

Exeter Chiefs	17–15	Newcastle Falcons (1 BP)
Try: Rigg 6' c Moloney 36' m Fisilau 78' m Con: Slade (1/3) 7'	Report	Try: Davis 12' c M. Clark 27' m Con: Connon (1/2) 13'; Pen: Connon (1/1) 40'

Sandy Park
Attendance: 9,981
Referee: Adam Leal

29 March 2025
15:05

(1 BP) Bath	47–28	Harlequins (1 BP)
Try: Cokanasiga 3' m T. Hill 8' c Molony 19' c Muir (2) 21' c, 37' c Ojomoh 52' c van Wyk 64' c Con: Russell (6/7) 9', 20', 22', 38', 53', 65'	Report	Try: Northmore 24' c Lamositele 34' c Baxter 46' c Riley 76' c Con: Benson (1/1) 25'; M. Smith (3/3) 35', 47', 77'

The Recreation Ground
Attendance: 14,509
Referee: Anthony Woodthorpe

29 March 2025
17:30

(1 BP) Gloucester	53–28	Bristol Bears (1 BP)
Try: Wade (3) 4' m, 40+1' m, 45' c Hathaway 7' m C. Harris 13' c S. Atkinson (3) 17' c, 30' m, 42' c Barton 51' m Con: Carreras (1/3) 14'; C. Atkinson (1/3) 18'; T. Williams (2/3) 43', 46'	Report	Try: Harding 19' c J. Williams (2) 27' c, 62' c Lahiff 35' c Con: Byrne (3/3) 20', 28', 36'; MacGinty (1/1) 63'

Kingsholm
Referee: Christophe Ridley

30 March 2025
15:00

(1 BP) Leicester Tigers	22–29	Saracens (1 BP)
Try: Steward 18' c Liebenberg (2) 40+1' m, 41' c Con: Pollard (2/3) 19', 42'; Drop: Pollard (1/1) 26'	Report	Try: George 3' c González 10' c Hall 45' m Dan 62' c Con: Lozowski (2/3) 4', 11'; Burke (1/1) 63'; Drop: Lozowski (1/1) 37'

Welford Road
Attendance: 19,646
Referee: Luke Pearce

=== Round 14 ===
18 April 2025
19:45

(2 BP) Newcastle Falcons	34–35	Northampton Saints (1 BP)
Try: Blamire 5' c Doherty 42' m Hearle 60' c Stevenson 66' m M. Pepper 75' c Con: Connon (3/5) 6', 61', 76'; Pen: Connon (1/1) 12'	Report	Try: Wright 9' c L. Green 31' c F. Smith 37' c Glister 39' c T. James 56' c Con: Hutchinson 10'; F. Smith (4/4) 32', 38', 40', 57'

Kingston Park
Attendance: 6,100
Referee: Luke Pearce

19 April 2025
15:00

(1 BP) Exeter Chiefs	24–26	Bath (1 BP)
Try: Yeandle 18' c Brown-Bampoe (2) 49' c, 58' c Con: Slade (3/3) 19', 50', 59'; Pen: Slade (1/1) 4'	Report	Try: Penalty try 10'; Annett 23' m Bayliss 27' c Muir 29' c Con: Russell (2/3) 28', 30'

Sandy Park
Referee: Anthony Woodthorpe

19 April 2025
15:05

(1 BP) Harlequins	29–43	Sale Sharks (1 BP)
Try: Kenningham 5' c Murley 23' m Anderson 59' c Jibulu 75' c Con: M. Smith (3/4) 6', 60', 76'; Pen: M. Smith (1/1) 2'	Report	Try: Cowan-Dickie 11' m T. Curry (2) 16' c, 37' c Opoku-Fordjour 30' c J. Hill 41' m J-L. du Preez 52' m Roebuck 77' c Con: R. du Preez (4/7) 17', 31', 38' 78'

Twickenham Stoop
Referee: Matthew Carley

19 April 2025
17:30

(1 BP) Saracens	36–14	Gloucester
Try: Segun 9' m Tompkins 25' c Dan (2) 44' c, 51' c González 69' m George 74' m Con: Burke (3/6) 26', 45', 52'	Report	Try: C. Harris 6' c Carreas 33' c Con: Carreas (2/2) 7', 34'

StoneX Stadium
Referee: Adam Leal

20 April 2025
15:00

Bristol Bears	19–36	Leicester Tigers (1 BP)
Try: Ibitoye 10' m Ravouvou 45' c Randall 65' c Con: MacGinty (2/3) 46', 66'	Report	Try: Radwan 3' m Hassell-Collins 17' c van Poortvliet 24' c Steward 62' c Henderson 79' c Con: Pollard (3/4) 18', 25', 63'; Shillcock (1/1) 80'; Pen: Pollard (1/1) 33'

Ashton Gate
Referee: Karl Dickson

=== Round 15 ===
25 April 2025
19:45

Sale Sharks	25–7	Saracens
Try: Ma'asi-White 1' m Ford 16' c Reed 26' c Con: Ford (2/3) 17', 27'; Pen: Ford (2/2) 5', 66'	Report	Try: Hall 31' c Con: Burke (1/1) 32'

Salford Community Stadium
Referee: Christophe Ridley

26 April 2025
15:00

(1 BP) Bath	55–19	Newcastle Falcons
Try: Donoghue 1' c Carr-Smith 32' c Roux 44' c Underhill 50' c Emens (2) 57' m, 59' c Henessey 67' m Redpath 80+1' c Con: Donoghue (4/4) 2', 33', 45', 51'; Russell (2/4) 60', 80+2'; Pen: Donoghue (1/1) 28'	Report	Try: Neild 16' m Doherty (2) 39' c, 41' c Con: Connon (2/3) 40', 42'

The Recreation Ground
Referee: Craig Maxwell-Keys

26 April 2025
15:05

(1 BP) Leicester Tigers	40–7	Harlequins
Try: Radwan (3) 16' m, 45' c, 57' c Hassell-Collins (2) 30' c, 54' c Liebenberg 73' c Con: Pollard (4/5) 31', 46', 55', 59'; Shillcock (1/1) 74'	Report	Try: Northmore 40+3' c Con: M. Smith (1/1) 40+4'

Welford Road
Attendance: 25,849
Referee: Anthony Woodthorpe

26 April 2025
17:30

(1 BP) Northampton Saints	48–31	Bristol Bears (1 BP)
Try: Mitchell 11' c Langdon 18' c Freeman (2) 22' m, 35' m Iyogun 45' c Augustus 58' c Pollock 74' c Con: F. Smith (4/6) 12', 19', 46', 59'; Hutchinson (1/1) 75'; Pen: F. Smith (1/1) 39'	Report	Try: D. Bailey 5' m Ibitoye (2) 38' c, 77' m J. Williams (2) 72' c, 78' c Con: MacGinty (2/4) 39', 79'; J. Williams (1/1) 73'

Franklin's Gardens
Attendance: 15,153
Referee: Adam Leal

27 April 2025
15:00

(1 BP) Gloucester	79–17	Exeter Chiefs
Try: Clement 5' m Blake 13' m Ludlow 16' c C. Harris 19' m S. Atkinson (2) 25' c, 54' c Anscombe 29' c T. Williams 38' c Ford-Robinson 45' m Wade 48' m Singleton (3) 57' c, 64' m, 68' c Con: Carreras (6/11) 17', 26', 30', 39', 55', 58'; Anscombe (1/2) 69'	Report	Try: Hodge 32' c Rigg 71' m Haydon-Wood 80' m Con: Slade (1/3) 33'

Kingsholm
Referee: Karl Dickson

=== Round 16 ===
9 May 2025
19:45

(1 BP) Leicester Tigers	44–34	Sale Sharks (1 BP)
Try: Radwan 5' c Hassell-Collins (2) 49' c, 58' c Ilione (2) 71' c, 80' c Con: Pollard (5/5) 6', 50', 59, 72, 80+1'; Pen: Pollard (3/3) 13', 20', 28'	Report	Try: Cowan-Dickie 1' m Ma'asi-White 15' c Reed 22' c R. du Preez (2) 41' c, 73' m Con: Ford (3/5) 16', 23', 41'; Pen: Ford (1/1) 61'

Welford Road
Referee: Matthew Carley

10 May 2025
15:00

(1 BP) Saracens	75–28	Newcastle Falcons (1 BP)
Try: González (3) 4' c, 41' c, 47' c Dan 9' c Earl (2) 16' m, 74' c van Zyl 23' c Itoje 28' c George 57' c C. Bracken 66' c Willis 79' c Con: Burke (7/8) 5', 10', 24', 29', 42', 48', 58'; Johnson (3/3) 67', 75', 80'	Report	Try: S. Stuart (2) 13' c, 54' c Lockwood 40+4' c Stevenson 62' c Con: Connon (4/4) 14', 40+5', 55', 63'

StoneX Stadium
Attendance: 9,204
Referee: Jack Makepeace

10 May 2025
15:05

(1 BP) Bristol Bears	36–14	Bath
Try: Ibitoye 26' m Lane 30' c Oghre 40' c Harding 43' c Capon 76' m Mata 78' m Con: MacGinty (3/6) 31', 40+1', 44'	Report	Try: Donoghue 17' c Richards 54' c Con: Donoghue (2/2) 18', 55'

Principality Stadium
Attendance: 51,095
Referee: Luke Pearce

10 May 2025
17:30

(1 BP) Harlequins	38–19	Gloucester
Try: Murley (3) 9' c, 38' c, 48' m W. Evans 23' c Isgró (2) 30' c, 56' m Con: M. Smith (4/6) 10', 24', 31', 39'	Report	Try: Wade 32' c Carreras 64' c Cotgreave 71' m Con: Carreras (1/1) 33'; T. Williams (1/2) 65'

Twickenham
Referee: Adam Leal

11 May 2025
15:00

(1 BP) Exeter Chiefs	42–14	Northampton Saints
Try: Lilley 13' c Skinner (2) 37' c, 78' c Brown-Bampoe (2) 40' c, 75' c Moloney 58' c Con: Slade (5/5) 14', 38', 40+1', 59', 76'; Hodge (1/1) 79'	Report	Try: Garside 21' c Lockett 42' c Con: James (2/2) 22', 43'

Sandy Park
Attendance: 8,899
Referee: Karl Dickson

=== Round 17 ===
16 May 2025
19:45

Newcastle Falcons	12–26	Gloucester (1 BP)
Try: Stevenson 6' m Davis 65' c Con: Connon (1/2) 65'	Report	Try: C. Harris 16' c Penalty try 23'; S. Atkinson 24' c Cotgreave 59' m Con: Carreras (2/3) 17', 24'

Kingston Park
Attendance: 5,875
Referee: Matthew Carley

16 May 2025
19:45

(1 BP) Sale Sharks	41–27	Bristol Bears (1 BP)
Try: D. du Preez 22' c McElroy 35' c J. Hill 53' c Ma'asi-White 63' c Quirke 71' c Con: Ford (5/5) 23', 36', 53', 64', 72'; Pen: Ford (2/2) 8', 28'	Report	Try: Randall 26' m Mata 47' m Naulago 57' c Byrne 76' m Ravouvou 78' m Con: J. Williams (1/1) 58'

Salford Community Stadium
Referee: Adam Leal

17 May 2025
15:05

(1 BP) Northampton Saints	28–24	Saracens (2 BP)
Try: Kemeny 7' c Haffar (2) 59' c, 80' c Penalty try 71'; Con: Fin Smith (1/1) 8'; Hutchinson (2/2) 59', 80+3'	Report	Try: Willis 12' m González 18' c Goode 35' c Segun 43' m Con: Burke (2/4) 19', 36'

Franklin's Gardens
Attendance: 15,153
Referee: Luke Pearce

17 May 2025
17:30

(1 BP) Bath	43–15	Leicester Tigers
Try: Spencer 3' m Obano 20' c Roux 38' c Dunn 47' m Stuart 66' c Cokanasiga 76' c Butt 80' m Con: Russell (4/7) 21', 39', 67', 77'	Report	Try: Woodward 16' m Radwan 32' c Con: Pollard (1/2) 33'; Pen: Pollard (1/1) 7'

The Recreation Ground
Referee: Anthony Woodthorpe

18 May 2025
15:00

Harlequins	24–22	Exeter Chiefs (1 BP)
Try: Murley 2' c Porter 19' c M. Smith 59' c Con: M. Smith (3/3) 3', 20', 60'; Pen: M. Smith (1/1) 70'	Report	Try: Tuima 21' c Wyatt 28' m Townsend 42' c Con: Slade (2/3) 22', 43'; Pen: Slade (1/1) 63'

Twickenham Stoop
Referee: Joe James

=== Round 18 ===
31 May 2025
15:05

(1 BP) Bristol Bears	52–26	Harlequins (1 BP)
Try: Kloska 1' c Batley 4' c Ravouvou 19' m Mata 23' c Ibitoye (2) 46' m, 63' c S. Grondona 57' c Janse van Rensburg 68' c Con: MacGinty (6/8) 2', 5', 24', 58', 64', 69'	Report	Try: Murley (2) 16' c, 33' m Dombrandt 49' c Hammond 52' c Con: Benson (3/4) 17', 50', 53'

Ashton Gate
Referee: Luke Pearce

31 May 2025
15:05

(2 BP) Exeter Chiefs	26–30	Sale Sharks
Try: Brown-Bampoe 18' m Hodge 48' c Haydon-Wood 56' c Capstick 76' c Con: Hodge (3/4) 49', 57', 77'	Report	Try: Ma'asi-White 24' c Rodd 32' c Cowan-Dickie 67' c Con: Ford (3/3) 25', 33', 68'; Pen: Ford (3/3) 1', 21', 52'

Sandy Park
Referee: Christophe Ridley

31 May 2025
15:05

(1 BP) Gloucester	41–26	Northampton Saints (1 BP)
Try: Cotgreave (3) 3' c, 25' m, 50' c Wade (2) 30' m, 79' m T. Williams 33' m S. Atkinson 53' c Con: Carreras (3/6) 4', 51', 54'	Report	Try: Pearson 7' c Litchfield 16' c Weimann 47' c Mapu 59' c Con: Hutchinson (3/4) 8', 17', 48'

Kingsholm
Attendance: 15,900
Referee: Anthony Woodthorpe

31 May 2025
15:05

(1 BP) Leicester Tigers	42–20	Newcastle Falcons
Try: Liebenberg 18' c Bassett 32' c Kata 52' c Heyes 60' c Rogerson 73' c Hassell-Collins 78' c Con: Pollard (4/4) 19', 33', 53', 61'; Volavola (2/2) 74', 79'	Report	Try: Leatherbarrow 67' c Arnold 76' c Con: Connon (2/2) 68', 77'; Pen: Connon (2/2) 16', 39'

Welford Road
Attendance: 25,835
Referee: Adam Leal

31 May 2025
15:05

(1 BP) Saracens	36–26	Bath (1 BP)
Try: Segun 9' m George (2) 19' c, 47' m Daly 30' c Dan 53' m Burke 59' c Con: Burke (3/6) 20', 31', 60'	Report	Try: Green 5' c Offiah 64' m Tuipulotu 72' c Hennessey 75' c Con: Bailey (3/4) 6', 73', 76'

StoneX Stadium
Referee: Karl Dickson

== Play-offs ==
As in previous seasons, the top four teams in the Premiership table, following the conclusion of the regular season, contested the play-off semi-finals in a 1st vs 4th and 2nd vs 3rd format, with the higher ranking team having home advantage. The two winners of the semi-finals then met in the Premiership Final at Allianz Stadium in Twickenham, London on 14 June 2025.

Semi-finals
1	Bath	34
4	Bristol	20
2	Leicester	21
3	Sale	16

Final
1	Bath	23
2	Leicester	21

=== Semi-finals ===
6 June 2025
19:45

Bath (1)	34–20	(4) Bristol Bears
Try: Hill 41' c Cokanasiga 48' c Muir 54' c Ojomoh 59' c Con: Russell (4/4) 42', 49', 55', 60'; Pen: Russell (2/2) 22', 37'	Report	Try: Dun 17' c Janse van Rensburg 73' c Con: MacGinty (2/2) 18', 73'; Pen: MacGinty (2/2) 12', 40'

The Recreation Ground
Referee: Christophe Ridley

7 June 2025
15:30

Leicester Tigers (2)	21–16	(3) Sale Sharks
Try: Radwan (2) 20' m, 28' m Perese 67' m Pen: Pollard (2/2) 7', 52'	Report	Try: du Preez 57' c Con: Ford (1/1) 57'; Pen: Ford (3/3) 18', 46', 65'

Welford Road
Referee: Matthew Carley

=== Final ===
14 June 2025
15:00

Bath (1)	23–21	(2) Leicester Tigers
Try: du Toit 26' c Ojomoh 49' c Con: Russell (2/2) 27', 50'; Pen: Russell (3/3) 9', 41', 70'	Report	Try: van Poortvliet 5' c Kata 67' c Ilione 75' c Con: Pollard (3/3) 5', 68', 76'

Twickenham Stadium
Attendance: 81,708
Referee: Karl Dickson

Team details

FB	15	(England) Tom de Glanville
RW	14	(England) Joe Cokanasiga
OC	13	(England) Max Ojomoh
IC	12	(Scotland) Cameron Redpath
LW	11	(England) Will Muir
FH	10	(Scotland) Finn Russell
SH	9	(England) Ben Spencer (c)
N8	8	(England) Miles Reid	(substituted off) 61'
OF	7	(England) Guy Pepper
BF	6	(England) Ted Hill
RL	5	(England) Charlie Ewels	(substituted off) 68'
LL	4	(Ireland) Quinn Roux	(substituted off) 61'
TP	3	(South Africa) Thomas du Toit	(substituted off) 61'
HK	2	(England) Tom Dunn	(substituted off) 68'
LP	1	(England) Beno Obano	(substituted off) 61'
Substitutions:
HK	16	(Ireland) Niall Annett	(substituted on) 68'
PR	17	(South Africa) Francois van Wyk	(substituted on) 61'
PR	18	(England) Will Stuart	(substituted on) 61'
LK	19	(Ireland) Ross Molony	(substituted on) 68'
LK	20	(Scotland) Josh Bayliss	(substituted on) 61'
SH	21	(England) Tom Carr-Smith
FB	22	(England) Ciaran Donoghue
BR	23	(England) Alfie Barbeary	(substituted on) 61'
Coach:
(South Africa) Johann van Graan

FB	15	(England) Freddie Steward
RW	14	(England) Adam Radwan
OC	13	(Tonga) Solomone Kata
IC	12	(England) Joseph Woodward
LW	11	(England) Ollie Hassell-Collins		(substituted off) 50'
FH	10	(England) Handré Pollard
SH	9	(England) Jack van Poortvliet		(substituted off) 54'
N8	8	(Wales) Olly Cracknell		(substituted off) 71'
OF	7	(Wales) Tommy Reffell		(substituted off) 29'	(substituted on) 54'
BF	6	(South Africa) Hanro Liebenberg
RL	5	(England) Ollie Chessum
LL	4	(Scotland) Cameron Henderson
TP	3	(England) Joe Heyes		(substituted off) 63'
HK	2	(Argentina) Julián Montoya (c)	(yellow card) 28'
LP	1	(Wales) Nicky Smith		(substituted off) 68'
Substitutions:
HK	16	(England) Charlie Clare		(substituted on) 29'
PR	17	(Ireland) James Cronin		(substituted on) 68'
PR	18	(England) Dan Cole	(yellow card) 69'	(substituted on) 63'
BR	19	(England) Matt Rogerson		(substituted on) 71'
BR	20	(England) Emeka Ilione		(substituted on) 54'
SH	21	(England) Ben Youngs		(substituted on) 54'
FH	22	(Fiji) Ben Volavola
CE	23	(Australia) Izaia Perese
Coach:
(Australia) Michael Cheika

Player of the Match:
(England) Guy Pepper (Bath)
Assistant referees:
Luke Pearce
Adam Leal
Television Match Official:
Ian Tempest

== Promotion/relegation play-off ==
Subject to meeting the eligibility criteria for promotion, the team which places 1st in the 2024–25 RFU Championship will contest a two-legged play-off against the team which finishes 10th in the Premiership table. Each team will play one of the play-off legs at their home stadium, with the aggregate score across the two matches determining the winner, who will then compete in the following year's Premiership season. If the Championship winner is ineligible for promotion, no play-off will take place.

In March 2025, the RFU confirmed that Doncaster Knights were the only Championship club that would be eligible for promotion to the Premiership for the 2025–26 season. Therefore, since Doncaster did not win the 2024–25 Championship, there was no promotion and relegation between the two leagues.

== Leading scorers ==
Note: Flags to the left of player names indicate national team as has been defined under World Rugby eligibility rules, or primary nationality for players who have not yet earned international senior caps. Players may hold one or more non-WR nationalities.

=== Most points ===
As of 14 June 2025

Rank	Player	Club	Points
1	(Scotland) Finn Russell	Bath	183
2	(South Africa) Handré Pollard	Leicester	159
3	(Argentina) Santiago Carreras	Gloucester	124
4	(United States) AJ MacGinty	Bristol	119
5	(England) Marcus Smith	Harlequins	114
6	(South Africa) Robert du Preez	Sale	113
7	(England) George Ford	Sale	105
8	(England) Fin Smith	Northampton	104
9	(New Zealand) Fergus Burke	Saracens	90
10	(England) Josh Hodge	Exeter	86

=== Most tries ===
As of 14 June 2026

Rank	Player	Club	Tries
1	(England) Ollie Hassell-Collins	Leicester	13
1	(England) Gabriel Ibitoye	Bristol	13
3	(England) Cadan Murley	Harlequins	11
3	(Fiji) Kalaveti Ravouvou	Bristol	11
3	(England) Christian Wade	Gloucester	11
6	(England) Adam Radwan	Newcastle / Leicester	10
7	(England) Luke Cowan-Dickie	Sale	9
7	(England) Tom Roebuck	Sale	9
7	(Wales) Tomos Williams	Gloucester	9
7	(England) Will Muir	Bath	9

== Discipline ==
=== Citings/bans ===
Player/Coach	Match (Note: The club of the cited player or coach is listed in bold italics.)	Citing date	Law breached	Result	Ref
(Tonga) Solomone Kata	Exeter vs. **Leicester** (21 September 2024)	24 September 2024	9.13 – Dangerous Tackling (Red card)	4-match ban	
(Australia) Michael Cheika	Exeter vs. **Leicester** (21 September 2024)	1 October 2024	Conduct Prejudicial to the Interests of the Game or Union (Rule 5.12)	2-match ban (Note: The sanction is implemented as an immediate one-match ban, with the second match conditionally suspended until the end of the 2024–25 season.)	
(England) Sam Dugdale	Saracens vs. **Sale** (29 September 2024)	2 October 2024	9.27 – 2 Yellow Cards (Red card)	Sending off sufficient	
(England) Will Butt	**Bath** vs. Sale (26 October 2024)	30 October 2024	9.18 – Tip Tackle (Red card)	3-match ban	
(England) Nye Thomas	Bath vs. **Sale** (26 October 2024)	30 October 2024	9.13 – Dangerous Tackling (Red card)	3-match ban (Note: The ban is reduced by one match, subject to the player's completion of the World Rugby Coaching Intervention Programme.)	
(England) Jonny Hill	Bath vs. **Sale** (2023–24 season)	4 November 2024	Conduct Prejudicial to the Interests of the Game or Union (Rule 5.12)	10-match ban (Note: The sanction is implemented as a backdated six-match ban, with the remaining four matches conditionally suspended until the end of the 2025–26 season.)	
(England) Joe Heyes	Sale vs. **Leicester** (1 December 2024)	4 December 2024	9.20(b) – Dangerous Play in a Ruck or Maul (Citing)	Citing dismissed	
(England) Hugh Tizard	Newcastle vs. **Saracens** (29 November 2024)	27 December 2024	9.20(e) – Dangerous Play in a Ruck or Maul (Red card)	6-match ban	
(England) Toby Knight	Bath vs. **Saracens** (28 December 2024)	2 January 2025	9.13 – Dangerous Tackling (Red card)	3-match ban	
(England) Harry Wilson	Exeter vs. **Saracens** (25 January 2025)	28 January 2025	9.13 – Dangerous Tackling (Red card)	3-match ban	
(South Africa) Jacques Vermeulen	**Exeter** vs. Saracens (25 January 2025)	28 January 2025	9.20(b) – Dangerous Play in a Ruck or Maul (Citing)	2-match ban	
(Argentina) Santiago Grondona	**Bristol** vs. Exeter (22 March 2025)	25 March 2025	9.13 – Dangerous Tackling (Red card)	3-match ban	
(Argentina) Rodrigo Isgró	Bath vs. **Harlequins** (29 March 2025)	2 April 2025	9.13 – Dangerous Tackling (Citing)	3-match ban	
(England) Steve Diamond	Exeter vs. **Newcastle** (29 March 2025)	11 April 2025	Conduct Prejudicial to the Interests of the Game or Union (Rule 5.12)	6-match ban	
(Scotland) Cameron Anderson	Leicester vs. **Harlequins** (26 April 2025)	29 April 2025	9.27 – 2 Yellow Cards (Red card)	1-match ban	
(England) Louis Brown	Bath vs. **Newcastle** (26 April 2025)	29 April 2025	9.13 – Dangerous Tackling (Red card)	3-match ban	
(England) Ben Stevenson	**Newcastle** vs. Gloucester (16 May 2025)	29 May 2025	9.17 - Tackling Player in the Air (Red card)	2-match ban	
(England) Ollie Chessum	Bath vs. **Leicester** (17 May 2025)	20 May 2025	9.13 – Dangerous Tackling (Citing)	Citing dismissed	

== Awards ==
=== Player of the Month ===
The following players have received the Gallagher Premiership Player of the Month award during the 2024–25 season, as selected by a panel of media commentators, in addition to monthly public polls.

Month	Nominees	Club	Winner	Refs
September	(England) Will Butt	Bath	(England) Max Malins	
September	(England) Ollie Lawrence	Bath	(England) Max Malins	
September	(England) Max Malins	Bristol	(England) Max Malins	
September	(Scotland) Andy Onyeama-Christie	Saracens	(England) Max Malins	
October	(Wales) Olly Cracknell	Leicester	(England) Gabriel Ibitoye	
October	(England) Gabriel Ibitoye	Bristol	(England) Gabriel Ibitoye	
October	(Wales) Tomos Williams	Gloucester	(England) Gabriel Ibitoye	
October	(England) Tom Willis	Saracens	(England) Gabriel Ibitoye	
December	(England) Ben Curry	Sale	(England) Ben Curry	
December	(England) Ted Hill	Bath	(England) Ben Curry	
December	(South Africa) Benhard Janse van Rensburg	Bristol	(England) Ben Curry	
December	(Fiji) Kalaveti Ravouvou	Bristol	(England) Ben Curry	
January	(Argentina) Santiago Carreras	Gloucester	(Argentina) Santiago Carreras	
January	(England) James Chisholm	Harlequins	(Argentina) Santiago Carreras	
January	(England) Jack Kenningham	Harlequins	(Argentina) Santiago Carreras	
January	(Wales) Max Llewellyn	Gloucester	(Argentina) Santiago Carreras	
March	(England) George Ford	Sale	(Wales) Tomos Williams	
March	(England) Will Muir	Bath	(Wales) Tomos Williams	
March	(Scotland) Finn Russell	Bath	(Wales) Tomos Williams	
March	(Wales) Tomos Williams (2)	Gloucester	(Wales) Tomos Williams	
April	(England) George Ford	Sale	(England) George Ford	
April	(England) Alex Mitchell	Northampton	(England) George Ford	
April	(England) Adam Radwan	Leicester	(England) George Ford	
April	(England) Jack van Poortvliet	Leicester	(England) George Ford	

Note: No Player of the Month awards will be presented for November 2024 or February 2025, as no Premiership fixtures are scheduled to take place during either of these months, because of the two pauses in the season due to the 2024 Autumn Nations Series and 2025 Six Nations, respectively.

== Broadcast coverage ==
The competition is being broadcast by TNT Sports for the twelfth consecutive year. The 2024–25 season is the first of the new broadcast deal with Premiership Rugby, under which all 93 matches will be shown live on TNT and Discovery+. In addition, seven select matches, including the Premiership Final, will be broadcast free-to-air on ITV over the course of the season.

New to this season is a one-hour highlights programme, titled Gallagher Premiership Unleashed, which is aired on ITV4 each Wednesday at 7pm, recapping all of the fixtures held over the previous weekend. An abridged, half-hour version of the show is also shown on ITV1 every Wednesday at 11.45pm, while both programmes will remain available to view on demand via ITVX.

== See also ==
- 2024–25 European Rugby Champions Cup
- 2024–25 EPCR Challenge Cup
- 2024–25 Premiership Rugby Cup
- 2024–25 RFU Championship
- 2024–25 United Rugby Championship
- 2024–25 Top 14 season
- 2024–25 Rugby Pro D2 season
- 2025 Super Rugby Pacific season
