= Miles Reid (rugby union) =

English rugby union player

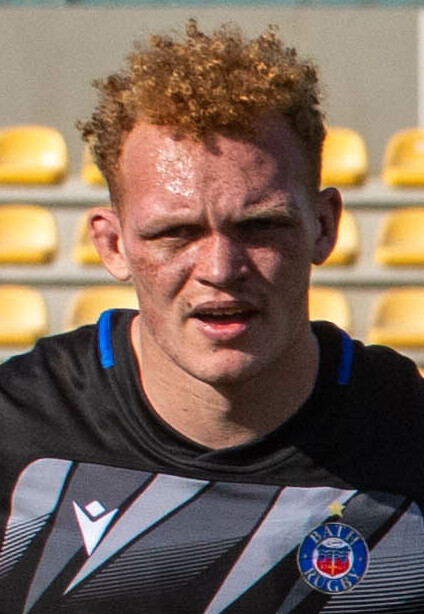
- Reid in 2021
- Born: Miles Reid; 5 September 1998 (age 28) Bath, England
- Height: 1.88 m (6 ft 2 in)
- Weight: 105 kg (16 st 7 lb; 231 lb)
- School: Beechen Cliff School

Rugby union career
- Position: Openside Flanker
- Current team: Bath
Senior career
Years	Team	Apps	(Points)
2018–	Bath	144	(80)
- Correct as of 1 May 2026

Miles Reid (born 5 September 1998) is a professional rugby union player who plays for Bath Rugby as a back row forward.

== Career ==
Reid made his senior debut for Bath in January 2018 against Newcastle Falcons in the Anglo-Welsh Cup. Bath won 21–8 at The Rec'.

He received praise for his performance against Ospreys as Bath won 32–19 to make the 2017–18 Anglo-Welsh Cup semi finals.

In February 2024, Reid signed a new three-and-a-half-year contract with Bath, having made 91 first team appearances, including several as captain. He was named in the Bath starting XV for his 100th appearance for Bath at the Rec' against Northampton Saints on the opening day of the 2024-25 season. That season, he was in the Bath matchday squad for the Premiership Rugby Cup final as Bath defeated Exeter Chiefs to win their first domestic trophy since 1996. He also started as Bath secured a 23–21 victory over Leicester Tigers in the 2024–25 Premiership Rugby final.

On 27 December 2025, Reid made his 100th league appearance for Bath, against Northampton Saints, at the Rec'. Reid marked his 150th appearance for Bath Rugby by captaining the side against Northampton Saints at Franklin's Gardens on 10 October 2026.

== Personal life ==
His father Mark played for Bath Rugby in the 1980s. Reid was educated at Beechen Cliff School, Bath, alongside Bath Rugby teammates Tom de Glanville and Orlando Bailey.
