= Emeka Ilione =

English rugby union player

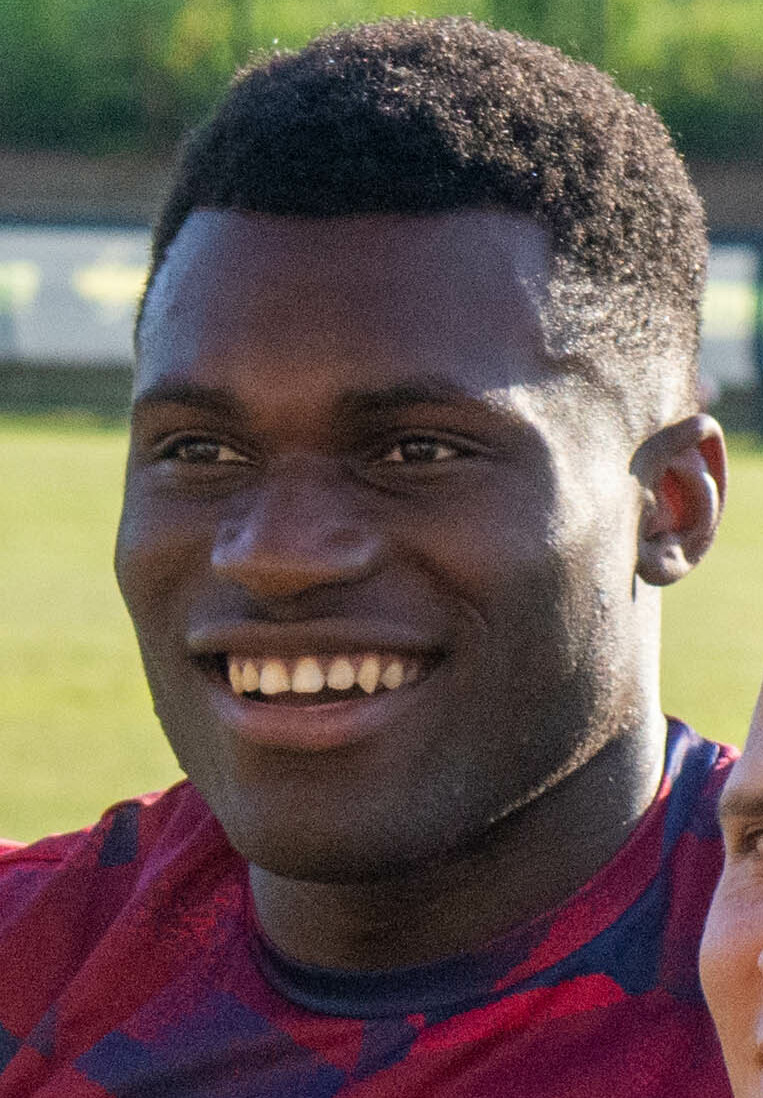
- Born: Remigius Chukwuemeka Ilione; 20 March 2002 (age 24) Mansfield, England
- Height: 1.90 m (6 ft 3 in)
- Weight: 112 kg (247 lb; 17 st 9 lb)
- School: Nottingham High School; Rugby School
- University: University of Nottingham

Rugby union career
- Position: Back Row
- Current team: Leicester Tigers
Senior career
Years	Team	Apps	(Points)
2022–	Leicester Tigers	58	(75)
2020	→ Nottingham (loan)	6	(0)
- Correct as of 25 January 2026
International career
Years	Team	Apps	(Points)
2019	England U18	3	(5)
2021–2022	England U20	10	(20)
- Correct as of 12 July 2022

Remigius Chukwuemeka Ilione (commonly known as Emeka; born 20 March 2002) is an English professional rugby union player for Leicester Tigers in Premiership Rugby. His preferred position is back row.

== Early life and education ==
Ilione was born in Mansfield, Nottinghamshire to Nigerian parents and attended Nottingham High School where he took up rugby at age 11, before attending Rugby School where he was head boy. He joined Leicester Tigers academy at under 13s.

Ilione balanced his professional rugby career with studying medicine at the University of Nottingham and graduated as a doctor in 2026.

== Rugby playing career ==
=== Junior level ===
In August 2019 Ilione scored a try for England under-18 in a defeat against South Africa. He was a member of the squad that won the 2021 Six Nations Under 20s Championship and started in the fixture against Scotland. In 2021 his potential was highlighted by Maro Itoje naming him in a theoretical British-Nigerians XV.

In 2022 Ilione scored tries against Wales and Ireland during the 2022 U20 tournament.

=== Senior level ===
Ilione was offered a professional contract with Leicester in the summer of 2022, making his club debut on 29 March 2022 in a Premiership Rugby Cup match against London Irish at Welford Road. He made his Premiership league debut- on 7 January 2023 as a 79th minute replacement against Newcastle Falcons, and a week later made his European Rugby Champions Cup debut on 13 January 2023 in a win at ASM Clermont Auvergne.

In May 2025 Ilione was called up to a training camp for the senior England squad by Steve Borthwick. Ilione scored a 75th minute try in the 2025 Premiership Final to bring Leicester within 4 points, the subsequent conversion was the last score in Tigers 23–21 defeat.
