= Steve Ojomoh =

England international rugby union player

- Born: 25 May 1970 (age 56) Benin City
- Height: 6 ft 3 in (1.91 m)
- Weight: 233 lb (106 kg)
- Notable relative: Max Ojomoh (son)

Rugby union career
- Position: Flanker
International career
Years	Team	Apps	(Points)
1994–1998	England	12	(0)

Stephen Oziegebe Ojomoh, known as Steve Ojomoh (born 25 May 1970 in Benin City), is a Nigerian-born English former rugby union footballer and a current coach. He played as a flanker.

== Club career ==
Ojomoh played for Moseley, Bath, and Gloucester in England, Overmach Parma in Italy, and Newport in Wales.

During the 1990s, he won 10 trophies with Bath including 5 Premiership Rugby league titles.

== International career ==
Ojomoh had 12 caps for the England national team from 1994 to 1998, without ever scoring. He played at the Five Nations in 1994, 1995 and 1996. He was also present at the 1995 Rugby World Cup finals, where England reached the fourth place, playing four matches.

== Coaching ==
After ending his player career, Ojomoh became a coach. He managed Trowbridge RFC, guiding them to success in winning the Intermediate cup against Leek RFC beating them 22–17.

== Personal life ==
Steve is the father of Bath centre, Max Ojomoh. Having been part of the Bath side that won the Premiership title in 1996, the club had to wait another 29 years before winning the title again where Max scored a try in the final, in a victory over Leicester Tigers, to help the club win the 2024–25 league title.
