= Max Ojomoh =

English rugby union player (born 2000)

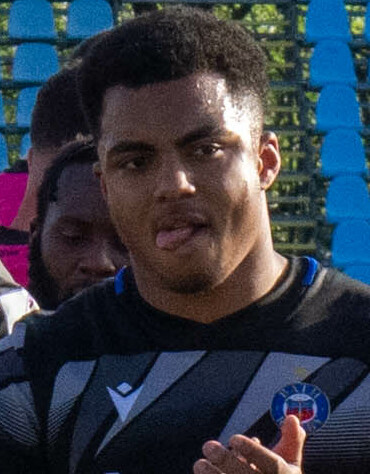
- Ojomoh in 2021
- Born: Max Alexander Ojomoh; 14 September 2000 (age 26) Bath, Somerset, England
- Height: 1.83 m (6 ft 0 in)
- Weight: 98 kg (216 lb; 15 st 6 lb)
- School: King Edward's School
- University: University of Bath
- Notable relative: Steve Ojomoh

Rugby union career
- Position(s): Centre, Fly Half
Youth career
- 2009–2014: Chippenham RFC
Senior career
Years	Team	Apps	(Points)
2019–	Bath	100	(90)
- Correct as of 16 June 2026
International career
Years	Team	Apps	(Points)
2019	England U18	1	(5)
2020	England U20	4	(0)
2024–	England A	5	(15)
2025–	England	2	(5)
- Correct as of 10 November 2026

Max Alexander Osaze Ojomoh (born 14 September 2000) is an English professional rugby union player who plays as a centre and fly half for Premiership club Bath Rugby and the England national team.

== Personal life ==
Max Ojomoh was born in Bath, Somerset on 14 September 2000. He is the son of former Bath Rugby and England player, Steve Ojomoh.

Ojomoh was educated at King Edward's School, Bath.

== Club career ==
Ojomoh began his rugby career aged six at Bath Rugby before joining Chippenham RFC aged nine. He joined the Bath Rugby academy aged fourteen and in September 2019 made his club debut against Exeter Chiefs in the Premiership Rugby Cup. In March 2021, he made his first league appearance off the bench against London Irish and his maiden European outing followed a week later against Zebre Parma in the EPCR Challenge Cup. He graduated from Bath Rugby's Academy to the senior squad in February 2022.

In March 2025, Ojomoh came off the bench as Bath beat Exeter in the 2024–25 Premiership Rugby Cup final to win their first domestic trophy since 1996. Later that season, he scored a try in the 2024–25 EPCR Challenge Cup final as Bath defeated Lyon at the Millennium Stadium to win their first European trophy for seventeen years.

In June 2025, Ojomoh scored a try in the 2024–25 Premiership Rugby final finishing an intercept by Finn Russell, as Bath defeated Leicester Tigers 23–21 to win the league title. Steve Ojomoh, his father, had been part of the last side to win the Premiership title with Bath 29 years earlier.

In September 2025, in the absence of first choice, Finn Russell, Ojomoh began the opening game of the 2025–26 season playing at fly half although place kicking duties would remain with scrum half, Ben Spencer. While deputising in this position, Bath won their opening two games of the season 47–31 and 28–16 against Harlequins and Sale Sharks respectively. In November 2025, he assisted the winning try for Henry Arundell in a 36–29 victory away at Saracens.

== International career ==
In 2019, Ojomoh scored a try on his debut for the England under-18 team against France at Cheshunt RFC. The following year saw him gain four caps for the England under-20 team during the 2020 Six Nations Under 20s Championship.

In June 2021, Ojomoh received his first call-up to the senior England squad by coach Eddie Jones for a training camp. In February 2024, he scored a try for England A against Portugal.

Ojomoh was included in the squad for the 2025 England rugby union tour of Argentina and the United States. On 19 July 2025, he made his test debut starting their last fixture of the trip as they defeated USA. Following an injury to Fraser Dingwall, he was named in the starting lineup for the final round of the 2025 Autumn Nations Series against Argentina. He went on to win man of the match, scoring a try and two assists including a cross-field kick during a 27–23 victory.

Ojomoh was selected to start in the 2026 Nations Championship against Japan on 14 November 2026.

=== List of international tries ===
No.	Date	Venue	Opponent	Score	Result	Competition
1	14 November 2026	Twickenham Stadium, London, England	Argentina	27–23	Win	2025 Autumn Nations Series

as of 14 November 2026

== Honours ==
Bath

- Premiership Rugby: 2024–2025
- EPCR Challenge Cup: 2024–2025
- Premiership Rugby Cup: 2024–2025
