= Freddie Thomas (rugby union) =

Welsh rugby union player (born 2001)

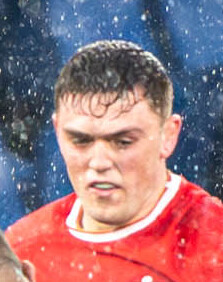
- Born: Freddie Thomas; 9 November 2001 (age 25) Gloucester, England
- Height: 195 cm (6 ft 5 in)
- Weight: 118 kg (260 lb)
- School: Dean Close School

Rugby union career
- Position(s): Lock, Back Row
- Current team: Gloucester
Senior career
| Years | Team | Apps | (Points) |
| 2020– | Gloucester | 76 | (55) |
International career
| Years | Team | Apps | (Points) |
| 2021 | England U20 | 4 | (0) |
| 2024– | Wales | 8 | (0) |

Freddie Thomas (born 9 November 2001) is a professional rugby union player who plays as a lock or back row for Premiership Rugby club Gloucester and the Wales national team.

== Club career ==
=== Gloucester ===
Thomas started playing rugby at the age of five with Worcestershire club Bredon Star RFC where his father was coach before attending Dean Close School. He was part of the Gloucester academy and joined the set up at under-13 level. Thomas has the ability to play lock, flanker and number eight, as a versatile player who was a key member of the academy set up.

Thomas made his club debut for Gloucester during the 2020–21 season against Lyon in the European Rugby Champions Cup and made a further appearance in the Premiership against Harlequins.

During the 2023–24 EPCR Challenge Cup campaign, Thomas started in their quarter-final win over Ospreys and semi-final victory against Benetton Rugby. He did not play in the final which saw Gloucester defeated by Sharks to finish runners up.

During the 2024–25 Premiership season, Thomas signed an extension with Gloucester that would allow him to remain eligible to represent Wales.

== International career ==
=== England U18 and U20 ===
In 2019 Thomas played for England under-18. He was included in the England U20 squad for the 2021 Six Nations Under 20s Championship and featured in four of their games as they completed a Grand Slam.

=== Wales ===
Thomas qualifies to represent Wales through his paternal grandparents who are from Swansea and his maternal grandmother and received his first selection for their senior squad during the 2024 end-of-year rugby union internationals. On 23 November 2024 he made his Test debut coming on as a replacement in their last match of the year against South Africa.

Thomas was selected for the 2025 end-of-year rugby union internationals. He came off the bench against Argentina, Japan, and New Zealand.

Thomas was named in the squad for the 2026 Six Nations by Steve Tandy.
