= Beno Obano =

English rugby union player (born 1994)

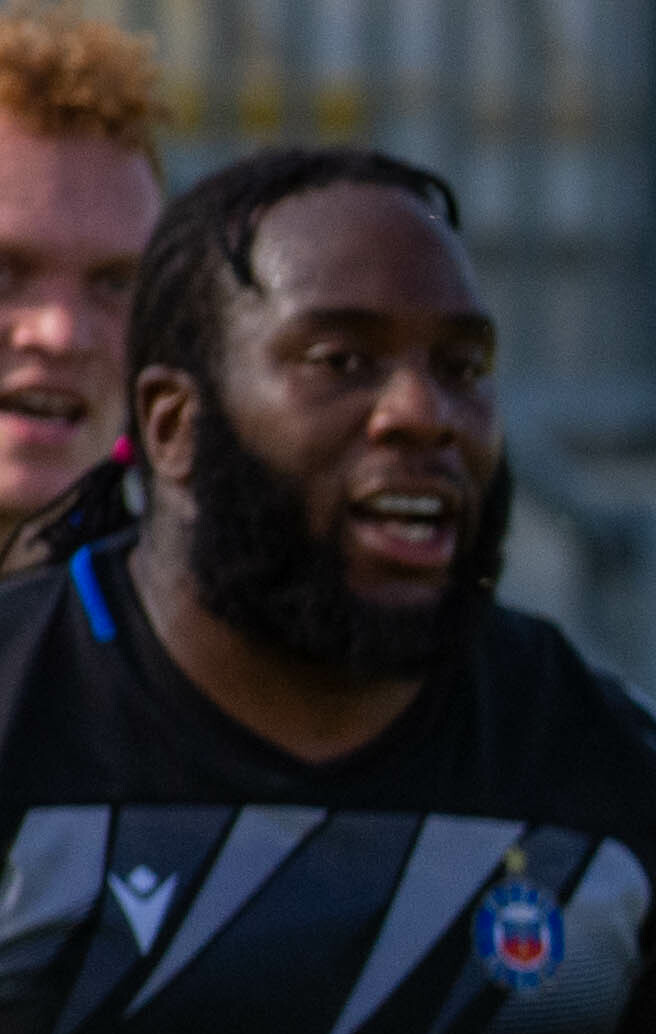
- Obano at the 2020–21 European Rugby Challenge Cup
- Full name: Ohwobeno Osemudiamen A.M. Obano
- Born: 25 October 1994 (age 32) Peckham, England
- Height: 1.83 m (6 ft 0 in)
- Weight: 120 kg (265 lb; 18 st 13 lb)
- School: London Oratory School; Dulwich College
- Notable relative: Maro Itoje (cousin)

Rugby union career
- Position: Prop
- Current team: Bath
Senior career
Years	Team	Apps	(Points)
2015–	Bath	184	(125)
- Correct as of 1 May 2026
International career
Years	Team	Apps	(Points)
2021–	England	5	(0)
- Correct as of 3 February 2024

Ohwobeno Osemudiamen A.M. Obano (born 25 October 1994) is an English professional rugby union player who plays as a prop for Premiership Rugby club Bath and the England national team.

== Early life ==
Obano was born in Peckham and later grew up in East Dulwich. He played in the 1st XV at The London Oratory School before winning a scholarship and bursary to Dulwich College. Whilst at Dulwich, Obano was a two-time winner of the Schools Cup.

He is the cousin of England lock, Maro Itoje. Obano has the nickname Sinny.

== Club career ==
Obano was a member of the Wasps Academy before joining Bath in 2014. He had a loan spell with Coventry during the 2014–15 National League 1 season. In February 2015, Obano made his first Premiership appearance for Bath against the Exeter Chiefs.

Obano started for the Bath side that lost to Exeter in the 2017–18 Anglo-Welsh Cup final. In June 2024 Obano was shown a red card during the Premiership final which they lost against Northampton Saints to finish runners up.

Obano came off the bench as Bath beat Exeter in the 2024–25 Premiership Rugby Cup final to win their first domestic trophy since 1996. Later that season, he scored a try in the 2024–25 EPCR Challenge Cup final as Bath defeated Lyon at the Millennium Stadium to win their first European trophy for seventeen years.

Obano started in the 2024–25 Premiership Rugby final which saw Bath defeat Leicester Tigers to become champions of England for the first time since 1996.

== International career ==
A long-term back injury ruled Obano out of the 2014 Junior World Cup. In December 2017, he received his first England call up for the 34 man Six Nations training squad. Obano was called up for England's tour of South Africa in 2018 but was injured during training camp. In the summer of 2019 he played against the Barbarians.

Obano was included in the squad for the 2021 Six Nations Championship. On 6 February 2021 he received his first England cap during the opening round of the tournament coming off the bench as a substitute replacement for Ellis Genge in their 6-11 loss to Scotland.

Obano was recalled for the 2021 July rugby union tests and made his second and third international appearances for England in victories over United States and Canada.

On 17 January 2024, Obano was called up to represent England in the 2024 Six Nations Championship. He was selected on the bench after Ellis Genge pulled out with a foot injury, shortly before England's opening match against Italy at Stadio Olimpico. Obano came on in the second half, receiving his fourth cap.

== Honours ==
Bath

- Premiership Rugby: 2024–2025
- EPCR Challenge Cup: 2024–2025
- Premiership Rugby Cup: 2024–2025
