= Rekeiti Ma'asi-White =

English rugby union player (born 2003)

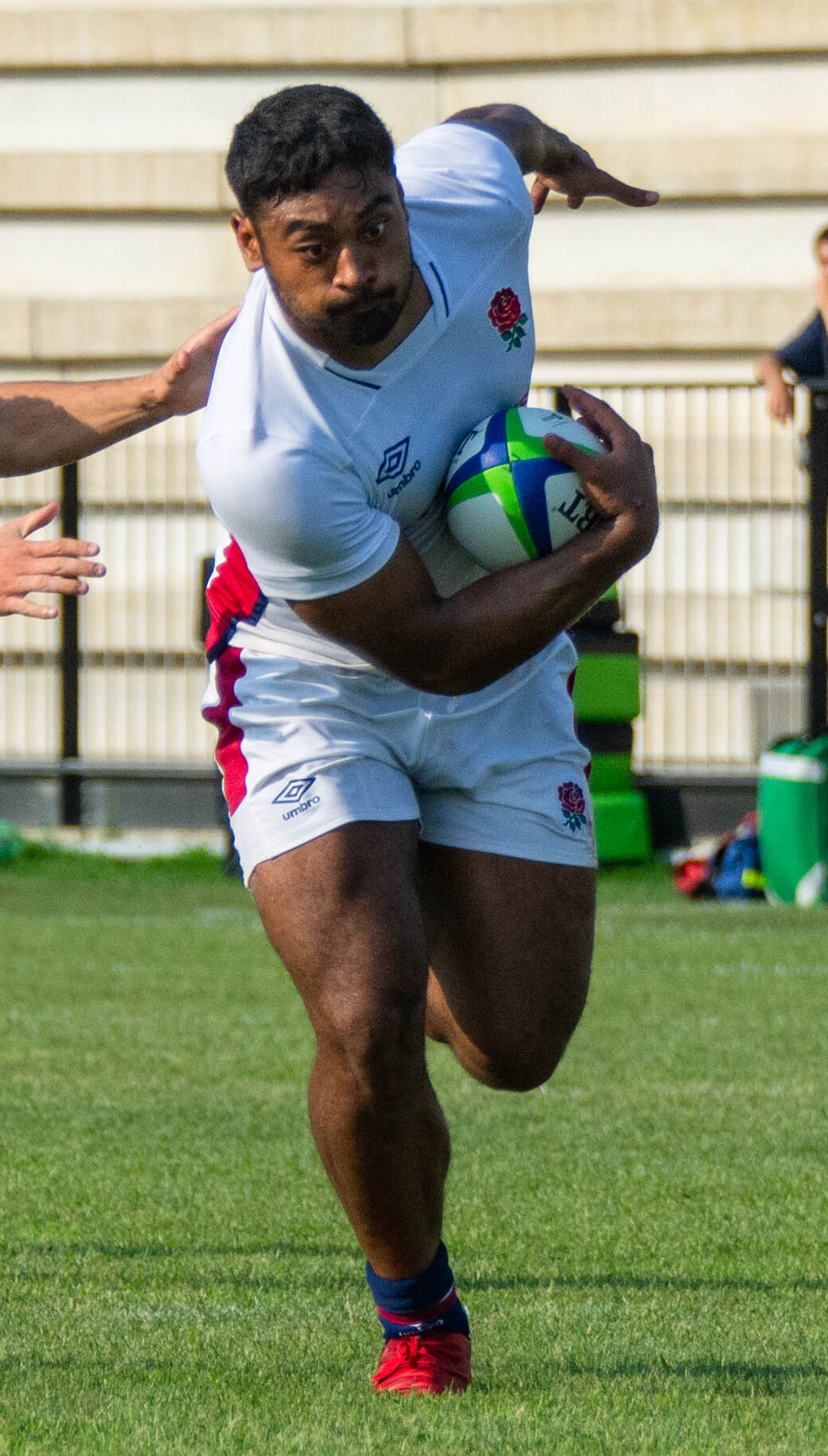
- Born: 3 February 2003 (age 23) Truro, England
- Height: 185 cm (6 ft 1 in)
- Weight: 102 kg (16 st 1 lb)
- School: Harrow School

Rugby union career
- Position: Centre
- Current team: Sale Sharks
Senior career
Years	Team	Apps	(Points)
2021–2022	Wasps	5	(0)
2021–2022	→ Ampthill	3	(5)
2022–	Sale Sharks	28	(30)
2022–2023	→ Caldy	6	(10)
- Correct as of 2 January 2026
International career
Years	Team	Apps	(Points)
2022–2023	England U20	15	(10)
2025–	England A	2	(0)
- Correct as of 15 November 2025

Rekeiti Ma'asi-White (born 3 February 2003) is an English professional rugby union player who plays as a centre for Premiership Rugby club Sale Sharks.

== Early life ==
Born in Truro, Cornwall, Ma'asi-White attended Caldicott Prep School and Harrow School.

== Club career ==
Ma'asi-White was in the youth academy at Wasps RFC and made his debut for their senior side during the 2021–22 Premiership Rugby Cup before they were disbanded for financial reasons. During his time at Wasps, he went on loan to Birmingham Moseley Rugby gaining 13 appearances for them and 30 points.

In November 2022, Ma'asi-White left Wasps to join Sale Sharks. He started in the 2025 league semi-final defeat against Leicester Tigers. On 13 November 2026, Ma'asi-White was a try scorer on his 50th appearance for Sale as they beat Exeter Chiefs 38-24 in the Prem Rugby Cup.

== International career ==
Ma'asi-White scored a try for England U20 against Wales during the 2023 Junior Six Nations. Later that year he was a member of the England squad that finished fourth at the 2023 World Rugby U20 Championship.

In February 2024 Ma'asi-White was called up to train with the England A team. In May 2025, he was called up to a training camp for the senior England squad by coach Steve Borthwick. Later that year in November 2025, Ma'asi-White made his first appearance for England A in a defeat against New Zealand.

== Personal life ==
His father Viliami Maʻasi represented Tonga 36 times, and played at the 2003 Rugby World Cup. He has brothers who played professional rugby including his brother Samson, who captained England at U18 level but had to give up the game after requiring a kidney transplant from his father.
