= Olly Cracknell =

Wales international rugby union player

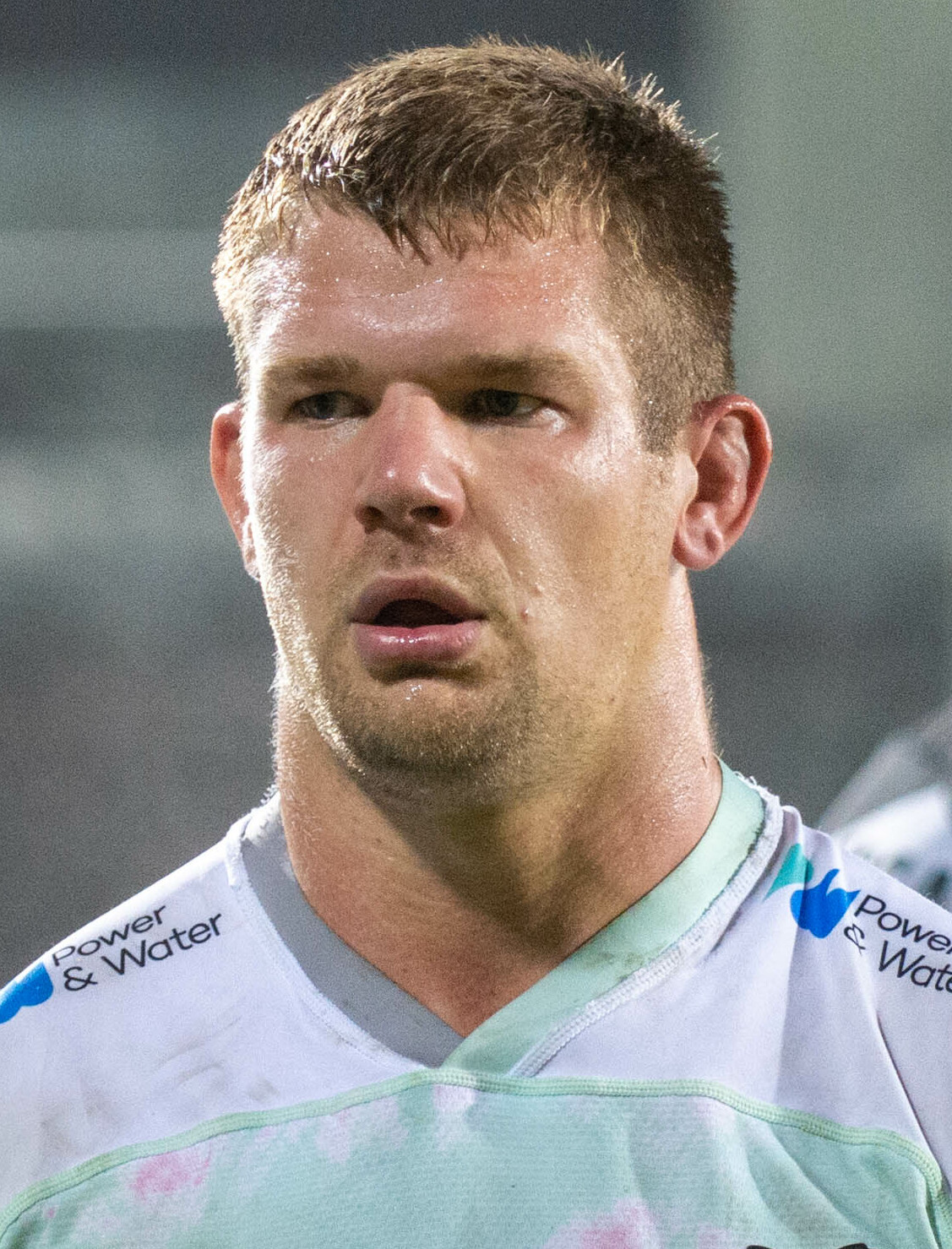
- Cracknell in 2020
- Born: Oliver Cracknell; 26 May 1994 (age 32) Leeds, England
- Height: 1.91 m (6 ft 3 in)
- Weight: 121 kg (19 st 1 lb; 267 lb)
- School: Leeds Grammar School

Rugby union career
- Position(s): Flanker, Number 8
- Current team: Leicester Tigers
Amateur team(s)
Years	Team	Apps	(Points)
- Leeds Tykes
- Border Bulldogs
- RGC 1404
Senior career
Years	Team	Apps	(Points)
2014–2021	Ospreys	117	(45)
2021–2022	London Irish	15	(0)
2022–	Leicester Tigers	93	(50)
- Correct as of 1 November 2026
International career
Years	Team	Apps	(Points)
2014	Wales U20	6	(0)
2025–	Wales	5	(0)
- Correct as of 9 November 2025

Oliver Cracknell (born 26 May 1994) is a Welsh professional rugby union player who plays as a flanker or number 8 for Premiership Rugby club Leicester Tigers. He is also a Wales Rugby Union international.

== Club career ==
Cracknell was part of the Leeds academy and as a teenager he toured South Africa with Leeds Grammar School in 2012. After that he was invited to spend 2013 with Border Bulldogs where he played for their youth team. Cracknell then joined RGC 1404 where his performances led to a first professional contract with Ospreys.

Cracknell made his club debut for Ospreys during the 2014-2015 season. He played in their 2017 League semi-final elimination against Munster. After making over 100 appearances for the Welsh region in November 2021 it was announced that Cracknell would leave to join London Irish.

Cracknell signed for Leicester Tigers on 12 May 2022. He made his Leicester debut on 10 September 2022 in a 24-20 defeat away to Exeter Chiefs during the opening round of the season and then scored his first try for Leicester the following week against Newcastle Falcons. That season Cracknell scored a try during their Champions Cup quarter-final defeat against Leinster and also played in their Premiership semi-final elimination to Sale Sharks.

== International career ==
Cracknell was born and raised in Leeds but qualifies for both England through place of birth and Wales due to his Welsh grandfather from Llanelli.

Cracknell represented Wales U20 during the 2014 Six Nations Under 20s Championship. Later that year he was a member of the Wales side that finished seventh at the 2014 IRB Junior World Championship.

In January 2017, Cracknell was included in Wales’ senior squad for the 2017 Six Nations Championship but was not capped during the tournament.

Cracknell was named in the squad for the 2026 Six Nations by Steve Tandy.
