= Joseph Woodward (rugby union) =

English rugby union player

- Born: Joseph Woodward; 17 September 2003 (age 23)
- Height: 1.83 m (6 ft 0 in)
- Weight: 92 kg (14 st 7 lb)

Rugby union career
- Position: Centre
- Current team: Leicester Tigers
Senior career
| Years | Team | Apps | (Points) |
| 2022– | Leicester Tigers | 60 | (32) |
| 2023-2024 | → Nottingham | 11 | (25) |
- Correct as of 16 November 2026
International career
| Years | Team | Apps | (Points) |
| 2021–2022 | England U18 | 6 | (0) |
| 2022–2023 | England U20 | 8 | (5) |
- Correct as of 6 December 2024

Joseph Woodward (born 17 September 2003) is an English rugby union player for Leicester Tigers in Premiership Rugby. His preferred position is centre.

== Early life ==
He attended King Edward VI School in Lichfield, Staffordshire and played rugby union for Lichfield RUFC as a youngster.

== Career ==
Woodward represented England at U18 level, captaining the side against France. He has risen through the ranks at Leicester Tigers Academy and made his senior debut as a replacement in their Premiership Rugby Cup tie against London Irish in April 2022.

Woodward was also dual-registered with Nottingham in the RFU Championship during the 2023–24 season. Woodward was called up to the England U20 squad for the 2023 Six Nations Under 20s Championship and was named in the squad for the 2023 World Rugby U20 Championship in South Africa.

He established himself as a regular in the Leicester first team during the 2024-25 season. He signed a new contract with the club in early 2025.
