= Will Rigg =

English rugby player

- Born: 22 March 2000 (age 26)
- Height: 1.85 m (6 ft 1 in)
- Weight: 105 kg (231 lb)
- School: Solihull School
- University: Cardiff Metropolitan University

Rugby union career
- Position: Centre
- Current team: Exeter Chiefs
Senior career
Years	Team	Apps	(Points)
2022-2024	Coventry	33	(75)
2024-2026	Exeter Chiefs	22	(45)
2026–	Newcastle Red Bulls	0	(0)

Will Rigg (born 22 March 2000) is an English professional rugby union footballer who plays as a centre for Premiership Rugby side Newcastle Red Bulls.

== Early life ==
He attended Solihull School where he played in the school rugby team and for his local club Silhillians, Also a keen cricketer, Rigg was a regular in Warwickshire County Cricket Club age-group sides and played an English winter for Coburg CC in Melbourne in Australian grade cricket, when he was 18 years-old. He studied Business Management at Cardiff Metropolitan University.

== Career ==
Rigg played for Cardiff Metropolitan University RFC prior to signing for Rugby Championship side Coventry in June 2022. He signed a new contract with Coventry in March 2023.

In February 2024 he signed for Premiership Rugby side Exeter Chiefs after scoring 14 tries in 31 appearances for Coventry. He made his Exeter debut came as a replacement away at Newcastle Falcons in March 2024, with his first start coming a week later at Sale Sharks. He made a try-scoring Premiership Rugby start for Exeter in the 2024-25 season against Harlequins in October 2024. His performances for Exeter that season included a 70-yard try against Gloucester in the Premiership Rugby Cup.

Rigg joined Cardiff Rugby on a short-term loan in October 2025.

On 27 January 2026, Rigg would leave Exeter to join Premiership rivals Newcastle Red Bulls on a two-year contract from the 2026-27 season.
