= Ethan Grayson =

English rugby union player

- Born: Ethan Grayson; 15 April 2002 (age 24) Northampton, England
- Height: 1.90 m (6 ft 3 in)
- Weight: 100 kg (16 st; 220 lb)
- School: Northampton School for Boys
- Notable relative(s): Paul Grayson (Father); James Grayson (Brother)

Rugby union career
- Position: Centre/Fullback/Fly-half
Amateur team(s)
Years	Team	Apps	(Points)
- Old Northamptonians
Senior career
Years	Team	Apps	(Points)
2021–2023	Northampton Saints	5	(0)
2021–2023	→ Bedford Blues (loan)	15	(15)
2023–2024	Bedford Blues	6	(5)
2024–2025	San Diego Legion	24	(40)
2025–	Newcastle Red Bulls	19	(45)
- Correct as of 13 February 2026
International career
Years	Team	Apps	(Points)
2019–2020	England U18s		
2021–2022	England U20s	9	(5)
- Correct as of 13 February 2026

Ethan Grayson (born 15 April 2004) is an English rugby union player who plays for Newcastle Red Bulls in the Premiership Rugby.

== Career ==
Grayson was part of Saints' Academy set-up for all of his junior career, Grayson featured at both fly half and centre during his development. His physicality settled him into the midfield where he was impressive for both Northampton School for Boys and Old Northamptonians RFC in recent years.

He featured for Saints' Under-18s through the 2019-20 season, Grayson donned the Black, Green and Gold for the 2019 Premiership Rugby 7s before signing his first contract with Northampton ahead of the 2020-21 campaign. Grayson also shone for Bedford Blues in the RFU Championship on a dual-registered basis.

Grayson was capped by England U18s in a three-test tour against South Africa during the summer of 2019. He was selected again for the England U20s for the 2022 Six Nations Under 20s Championship. The 2022 England U20s Junior World Championship was still cancelled due to the ongoing pandemic

Originally set for a move to London Irish, but it felt through due to the club entering financial administration. Grayson signed a short-term contract to re-join Bedford Blues at the start of the 2023-24 season. On 30 November 2023, Grayson would travel to the USA to join San Diego Legion for the 2024 Major League Rugby season

On 17 September 2024, Grayson signed a short-term contract with Newcastle Falcons mostly for the first-half of the 2024-25 English Premiership season. He will resume his contract with San Diego Legion for the 2025 Major League Rugby season. On 25 February 2025, Grayson would return to England to rejoin re-branded Newcastle Red Bulls on a permanent deal for the 2025-26 season in the Premiership.

On 1 January 2026, Grayson signed a two-year contract extension to stay with Newcastle until the end of the 2027-28 season.

== Personal life ==
His father Paul Grayson played his entire career at Northampton Saints, later became an assistant coach. He was also part of the England squad that won the 2003 Rugby World Cup. His older brother James Grayson plays professional rugby in Japan. His younger brother Joel Grayson also plays for Newcastle.
