= Ollie Hassell-Collins =

English rugby union player

- Born: Oliver John Hassell-Collins; 17 January 1999 (age 27) Reading, England
- Height: 192 cm (6 ft 4 in)
- Weight: 104 kg (229 lb; 16 st 5 lb)
- School: St. Bartholomew's School

Rugby union career
- Position: Wing
- Current team: Leicester Tigers
Youth career
- Newbury R.F.C.
Senior career
Years	Team	Apps	(Points)
2017–2018	Rosslyn Park	11	(30)
2018	Rams	1	(0)
2018–2023	London Irish	108	(200)
2023–	Leicester Tigers	80	(190)
- Correct as of 1 November 2026
International career
Years	Team	Apps	(Points)
2017	England U18	2	(5)
2019	England U20	3	(0)
2023–	England	2	(0)
2025–2026	England A	3	(20)
- Correct as of 22 February 2026
National sevens team
Years	Team		Comps
2019	England		1
- Correct as of 10 February 2023

Oliver John Hassell-Collins (born 17 January 1999) is an English professional rugby union player who primarily plays wing for Leicester Tigers in the Premiership Rugby. He has also represented England at international level, having made his test debut against Scotland during the 2023 Six Nations Championship. Hassell-Collins has previously played for Rosslyn Park, and London Irish.

== Career ==
Hassell-Collins started to play rugby as a child at local club Newbury R.F.C. where he was coached by his father prior to joining the academy of London Irish at the age of sixteen. In 2017 Hassell-Collins played for the England under-18 team on their tour of South Africa.

On 27 October 2018 he scored a try on his club debut in a RFU Championship match against Cornish Pirates. At the end of that season London Irish were promoted back to the Premiership. He played for England U20 in the 2019 Six Nations Under 20s Championship and was also a member of the squad that finished fifth at the 2019 World Rugby Under 20 Championship. That summer also saw him represent the England Sevens team at the 2019 Paris Sevens.

In June 2021 Hassell-Collins received his first call-up by coach Eddie Jones to the senior squad for a training camp and he was called up again for the 2022 Six Nations Championship. He was included in the squad for the 2023 Six Nations Championship by new coach Steve Borthwick and on 4 February 2023 made his debut starting in their opening round defeat to Scotland.

On 28 March 2023, Leicester Tigers announced that they had signed Hassell-Collins for the start of the 2023-24 season.
