= Josh Hodge =

English rugby union player

- Born: Joshua Ashley Hodge; 23 May 2000 (age 26) Lancaster, England
- Height: 1.89 m (6 ft 2 in)
- Weight: 85 kg (187 lb; 13 st 5 lb)
- School: Sedbergh School

Rugby union career
- Position(s): Full-back, Wing
- Current team: Exeter Chiefs
Senior career
Years	Team	Apps	(Points)
2018–2020	Newcastle Falcons	1	(5)
2020–2026	Exeter Chiefs	77	(273)
2026–	Newcastle Red Bulls	1	(0)
- Correct as of 31 January 2022
International career
Years	Team	Apps	(Points)
2018	England U18	5	(27)
2019	England U19	1	(16)
2019–2020	England U20	11	(90)
2024–	England A	1	(11)
- Correct as of 11 March 2024

Josh Hodge (born 23 May 2000) is an English professional rugby union player who plays as a full-back or wing for Premiership Rugby club Newcastle Red Bulls.

== Biography ==
Hodge was raised in South Cumbria where he represented Sedbergh School in the starting XV to win the 2017 Daily Mail Trophy and was Player of the Tournament in the Sedbergh Super 10s competition. He played for the England U18 team during their Six Nations Festival as well as the Falcons' junior academy and was promoted to Newcastle Falcons senior academy squad in the summer of 2018. Hodge made his debut for Newcastle during the 2019–20 RFU Championship, scoring a try against Yorkshire Carnegie to remain leaders in the league.

Hodge scored sixteen points on his only appearance for the England Under-19 team in their away win over Wales, and also scored a try on his debut for the England U20 side in the opening round of the 2019 Six Nations Under 20s Championship defeat against Ireland. Later that year, Hodge was the top points scorer at the 2019 World Rugby Under 20 Championship, kicking 24 goals from 24 and scoring two tries. He also played in the 2020 Six Nations Under 20s Championship.

On 18 June 2020, Hodge left Newcastle to sign for Exeter Chiefs on an undisclosed length deal from the 2020–21 season. He received his first call-up to train with the England senior squad as an 'apprentice' player during the 2020 Six Nations Championship under coach Eddie Jones. In February 2024, Hodge scored eleven points, including a try for England A in a victory over Portugal.

On 29 December 2025, Hodge agreed a return to his old club Newcastle Red Bulls on a three-year contract from the 2026-27 season. In April 2026, Hodge immediately left Exeter Chiefs to join Newcastle Red Bulls earlier than planned.
