= Maro Itoje =

British Lions & England international rugby union player

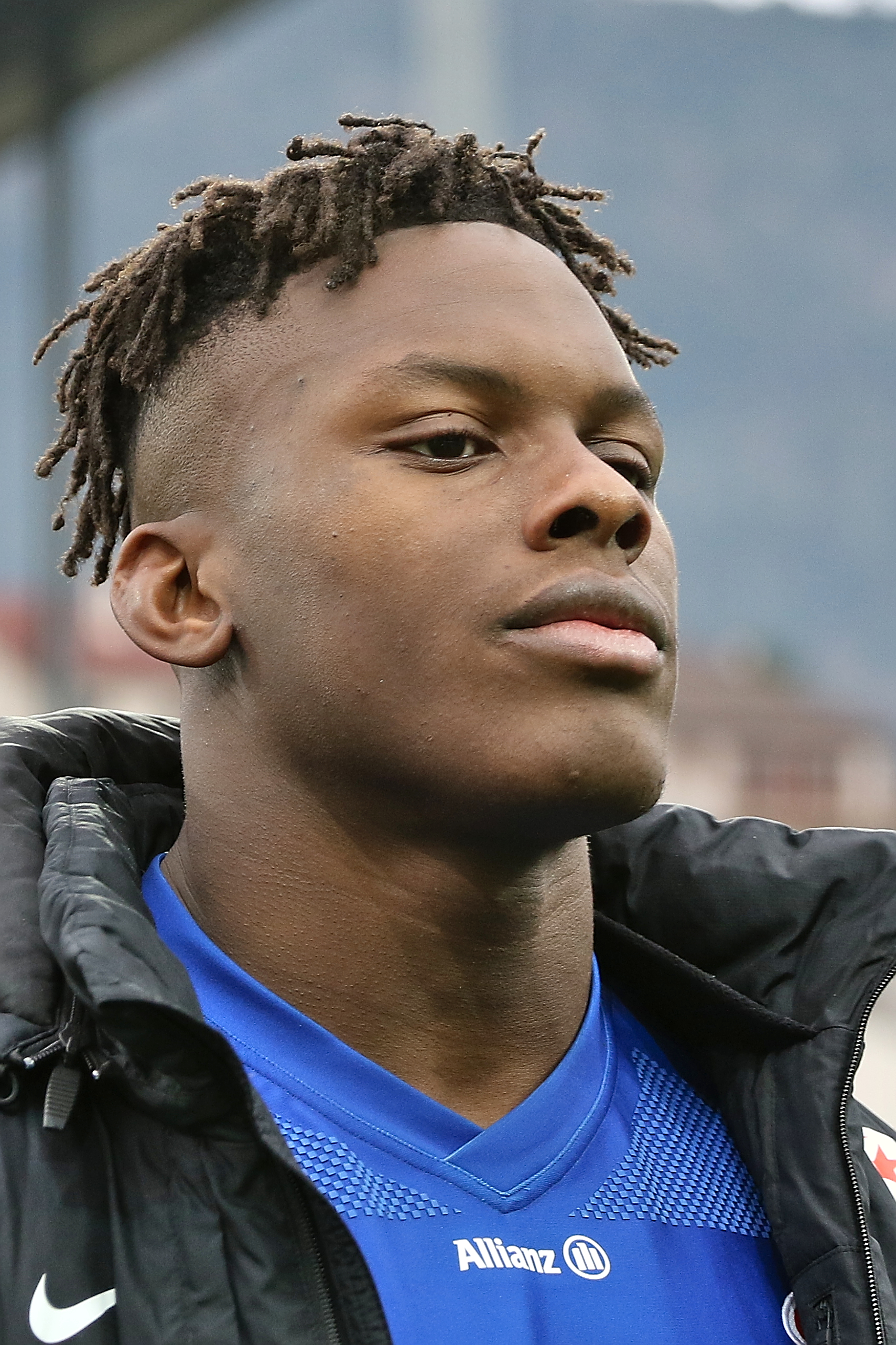
- Itoje representing Saracens during the Aviva Premiership
- Full name: Oghenemaro Miles Itoje
- Born: 28 October 1994 (age 32) Camden, London, England
- Height: 1.98 m (6 ft 6 in)
- Weight: 118 kg (260 lb; 18 st 8 lb)
- School: Salcombe Prep School; St George's School; Harrow School
- University: School of Oriental and African Studies, University of London; University of Warwick
- Notable relative(s): Beno Obano (cousin); Andre Harriman-Annous (nephew)

Rugby union career
- Position(s): Lock, Flanker
- Current team: Saracens
Senior career
Years	Team	Apps	(Points)
2013–	Saracens	217	(140)
- Correct as of 25 October 2026
International career
Years	Team	Apps	(Points)
2013–2014	England U20	10	(25)
2016–	England	104	(45)
2017, 2021, 2025	British & Irish Lions	9	(0)
- Correct as of 14 November 2026
Medal record
Men's Rugby union
Representing England
Rugby World Cup
Silver medal – second place	Japan 2019	Squad
Bronze medal – third place	France 2023	Squad

Oghenemaro Miles Itoje (born 28 October 1994) is an English professional rugby union player who plays as a lock for Premiership Rugby club Saracens. At international level, he is the current captain of the England national team, and the most recent captain of the British & Irish Lions.

Itoje signed his first professional contract with Saracens in 2012, making his debut the following year. He received a call-up to represent England in the 2016 Six Nations Championship. He has won five Premiership titles and three European titles with Saracens. At international level, Itoje has been a key figure in three British & Irish Lions tours, and been nominated for the World Rugby Player of the Year three times. With England, he has won a Grand Slam and Triple Crown.

Itoje reached 100 international test caps on 19 July 2025, after making 93 appearances for England and 7 for the British & Irish Lions.

== Early life ==
Maro Itoje was born in Camden, North London to Efe and Florence Itoje, who were both originally from Nigeria. He attended Salcombe Preparatory School in Southgate, North London at a primary level, before moving to board at St George's School in Harpenden, Hertfordshire. At St George's, Itoje was first introduced to rugby at the age of eleven, and has cited Stuart Mitchell, a local volunteer rugby coach at school and club (HRFC), as being "a massive influence in my formative years. He used to drive me all around the country wherever we had the games." Itoje later won a sports scholarship to Harrow School, a private school in London.

As a schoolboy, Itoje played several sports including basketball, football, rugby and athletics, representing England at Under-17 level in shot put. He studied Politics at the School of Oriental and African Studies in Bloomsbury, London at the same time as starting his rugby career. In 2023, he was awarded an MBA from Warwick Business School.

== Club career ==
His senior debut for Saracens came in the 2012–13 season, aged 18 when Itoje played against Cardiff Blues in the Anglo-Welsh Cup. He made his Aviva Premiership debut against Leicester Tigers later in the same season. Prior to this he had played for Harpenden at junior level (2005–11), then in the first team at Old Albanians, usually as a second row forward.

During his time at Saracens, Itoje has won five Premiership titles in 2015, 2016, 2018, 2019 and 2023, with Itoje featuring in all five finals. He also helped Saracens win the European Champions Cup in 2016, 2017 and 2019. In the 2015–16 season, Itoje was also awarded the title of European Player of the Year.

In the 2024–2025 season, Itoje was announced as the new Saracens club captain, following the departure of Owen Farrell.

In October 2026, with his existing deal with the club expiring the following year, and despite interest from Bordeaux Bègles and Perpignan in signing him, Itoje agreed a new deal to stay with Saracens until at least 2029.

== International career ==
=== England ===
Itoje represented England U18. He was chosen to captain England U20 and scored a try in every round of the 2014 Six Nations Under 20s Championship and was England's Man of the Tournament as they ultimately finished runners up. Later that year he also led the side at the 2014 IRB Junior World Championship and played in the final as England defeated South Africa U20 at Eden Park to win the tournament.

In January 2015, Itoje was called up to the England Saxons squad and on 30 January 2015 he made his only appearance at that level in a victory against Ireland Wolfhounds. Later that year in May 2015, Itoje received his first call-up to the senior England squad for a training camp prior to the 2015 Rugby World Cup. He was ultimately not selected for the tournament.

In January 2016, Itoje was called-up to the England squad again by new coach Eddie Jones for the 2016 Six Nations Championship. On 14 February 2016, Itoje made his Test debut as a substitute against Italy. In the next game he made his first start against Ireland and was then named player of the match in a victory over Wales that secured the Triple Crown. He played every minute in the last game of the tournament as England defeated France to achieve their first Grand slam for over a decade.

Itoje was a member of their 2016 tour of Australia, playing a starring role as he started all three tests against the Wallabies which saw England complete a series whitewash. He was subsequently named the World Rugby Breakthrough Player of the Year for 2016.

Itoje was again instrumental in England's defence of the Six Nations trophy in 2017, this time starting all five games as a blindside flanker rather than his more usual second row. They retained the title however missed out on a consecutive grand slam with defeat in the last game away to Ireland which also brought an end to a record equalling eighteen successive victories. The following year saw Itoje score his first international try in a defeat against South Africa at Ellis Park Stadium during the opening test of their 2018 tour of South Africa.

Itoje was included in the England squad for the 2019 Rugby World Cup and scored a try in a warm-up fixture against Ireland. He was named player of the match for his performance in the semi-final victory over New Zealand. He played every minute of the final which England lost against South Africa to finish runners up.

Itoje was a member of the England side that won the 2020 Six Nations Championship. His performances during the tournament led to him being nominated for player of the championship. Later that year he started in the final of the Autumn Nations Cup which saw England defeat France after extra time to lift the trophy.

Itoje was included in the England squad for the 2023 Rugby World Cup and scored a try in a warm-up fixture against Wales. He started their quarter-final against Fiji and semi-final defeat to champions South Africa. Itoje also featured in their last game of the tournament as England beat Argentina to finish third with the Bronze medal.

Throughout the 2024 campaign, Itoje won 15 turnovers for England – three more than any other player from a tier one nation. In the same year, he was also first for attacking rucks hit, with 300, and defensive rucks hit, with 137. That year he scored tries in defeats against New Zealand and Australia.

In January 2025, Itoje was named as the new England captain, ahead of the 2025 Six Nations Championship. In February 2025, he earned his first victory as captain during 26–25 win over France. In February 2025, he became the first England captain since Owen Farrell during the 2020 Championship to lift the Calcutta Cup after a 16–15 victory over Scotland. Itoje scored a try in the last round against Wales as England finished runners up.

In February 2026, Itoje was named as captain ahead of their 2026 Six Nations fixture against Ireland for his 100th England cap.

=== British & Irish Lions ===
Itoje was selected for the British & Irish Lions for their 2017 tour of New Zealand, as the youngest player named in the 41-man squad, aged 22. He was one of the standout players on the tour, scoring one try against the Māori All Blacks. He appeared in all three tests against New Zealand as the Lions went on to draw the series in the last game of the tour.

Itoje was again selected by coach Warren Gatland for the 2021 British & Irish Lions tour to South Africa. The tourists lost the test series in a closely-fought third game decider. He was again a standout player and was subsequently voted the Lions Player of the series by his peers. At the end of that year, Itoje received his third nomination for the World Rugby Player of the Year award.

On 8 May 2025, Itoje was confirmed as captain for the 2025 British & Irish Lions tour to Australia. He played every minute of the first and second tests which the Lions won to claim their first series victory for twelve years. He was injured during the last game of the tour as the Wallabies prevented a whitewash.

== Personal life ==
Itoje is 1.98 metres (6 ft 6 in) tall and weighs 110 kg (243 lb; 17 st 5 lb). His nephews Brandon and Andre Harriman-Annous both became footballers. He has expressed interests in politics and art. Itoje is a practising Christian and studies the Bible. He has also earned a master's degree in business.

In 2023, Itoje launched the Pearl Fund, an initiative aiming to gather funds to invest in the education of children in Nigeria, Ghana, and other African countries. In January 2025, Itoje voiced his support for the Six Nations to stay on free-to-air television, expressing that rugby should be a game that is accessible to everyone.

== Career statistics ==
=== List of international tries ===
as of 8 November 2025

No.	Date	Venue	Opponent	Result	Competition
1	9 June 2018	Ellis Park Stadium, Johannesburg, South Africa	South Africa	39–42	2018 England tour of South Africa
2	24 August 2019	Twickenham Stadium, London, England	Ireland	57–15	2019 Rugby World Cup warm-up matches
3	13 March 2021	Twickenham Stadium, London, England	France	23–20	2021 Six Nations Championship
4	6 November 2021	Twickenham Stadium, London, England	Tonga	69–3	2021 Autumn Nations Series
5	12 August 2023	Twickenham Stadium, London, England	Wales	19–17	2023 Rugby World Cup warm-up matches
6	6 July 2024	Forsyth Barr Stadium, Dunedin, New Zealand	New Zealand	15–16	2024 England tour of New Zealand
7	9 November 2024	Twickenham Stadium, London, England	Australia	37–42	2024 Autumn Nations Series
8	15 March 2025	Millennium Stadium, Cardiff, Wales	Wales	68–14	2025 Six Nations Championship
9	8 November 2025	Twickenham Stadium, London, England	Fiji	38–18	2025 Autumn Nations Series

== Honours ==
=== Saracens ===
- 5× Premiership winner: 2014–2015, 2015–2016, 2017–2018, 2018–2019, 2022–2023
- 3× European Rugby Champions Cup winner: 2015–2016, 2016–2017, 2018–2019
- 1× Anglo-Welsh Cup winner: 2014–2015
- 1× RFU Championship winner: 2020–2021
- 1x Premiership Rugby Shield winner: 2015
- 1x Premiership runner-up: 2021–2022

=== England U20 ===
- 1× World Rugby U20 Championship winner: 2014

=== England ===
- 3× Six Nations Championship winner: 2016, 2017, 2020
- 1× Grand Slam winner: 2016
- 2× Triple Crown winner: 2016, 2020
- 2x Six Nations Championship runner-up: 2019, 2025
- 1× Autumn Nations Cup winner: 2020
- 1× Rugby World Cup runner-up: 2019
- 1× Rugby World Cup third place: 2023

=== Individual ===
International

- 3× World Rugby Player of the Year nominee: 2016, 2017, 2021
- 1x World Rugby Breakthrough Player of the Year: 2016
- 1x World Rugby Dream Team of the Year: 2021
- 1x British & Irish Lions Player of the Series: 2021
- 2x Six Nations Player of the Championship nominee: 2017, 2020
- 1x Six Nations Team of the Championship: 2022

Domestic

- 1× European Rugby Player of the Year: 2016
- 1× European Rugby Player of the Year nominee: 2017
- 1x Premiership Player of the Season nominee: 2016
- 1x Premiership Discovery of the Season: 2016
- 1x Premiership Discovery of the Season nominee: 2015
- 3x Premiership Team of the Season: 2016, 2020, 2025

Sporting positions
Preceded by Jack Clifford	England U20 captain 2014	Succeeded by Charlie Ewels
Preceded by Owen Farrell	Saracens captain September 2024 –	Succeeded by Incumbent
Preceded by Jamie George	England captain February 2025 –	Succeeded by Incumbent
Preceded by Alun Wyn Jones	British & Irish Lions captain 2025	Succeeded by Incumbent
