= Will Porter =

English rugby union player

- Born: William Porter; 14 December 1998 (age 27) Philadelphia, US
- Height: 1.73 m (5 ft 8 in)
- Weight: 83 kg (13 st 1 lb)
- School: Merchant Taylors' School, Northwood
- Occupation: Professional rugby player

Rugby union career
- Position: Scrum-half
- Current team: Harlequins
Senior career
Years	Team	Apps	(Points)
2016–2022	Wasps	64	(25)
2022–2023	Bristol Bears	6	(5)
2023–	Harlequins	46	(60)
- Correct as of 4 October 2025
International career
Years	Team	Apps	(Points)
2016	England U17	1	(0)
2017	England U18	5	(5)
2017	England U19	1	(0)
2024–	England A	1	(0)
- Correct as of 17 November 2024

Will Porter (born 14 December 1998) is an English professional rugby union player for Harlequins.

== Career ==
=== Club career ===
Porter was born in Philadelphia. At the age of one he moved to England and attended Merchant Taylors' School. At the age of ten he began playing rugby at local club Amersham and Chiltern and later joined the academy of Wasps when he was fifteen.

==== Harlequins ====
In April 2024, he scored two tries in Harlequins 42–41 victory over Union Bordeaux Bègles in the quarter finals of the European Champions Cup. It was only the second time overall and the first time away that the club had won a knockout game in the competition reaching the semi-finals for the first time. On 27 April 2024, he scored twice as a second half replacement for Danny Care in a Premiership game against league leaders Northampton Saints, in a 41–32 victory for the Big Summer Kick Off fixture hosted at Twickenham Stadium.

=== International career ===
In August 2017 Porter scored a try for England under-18 against France.

In November 2024, Porter was named in the England A squad to face Australia A.

In February 2025, he was called up to the England A training squad to face Ireland A.

In June 2025 Porter was called up to a training camp for the senior England squad by Steve Borthwick.
