= Tom de Glanville =

English rugby union player

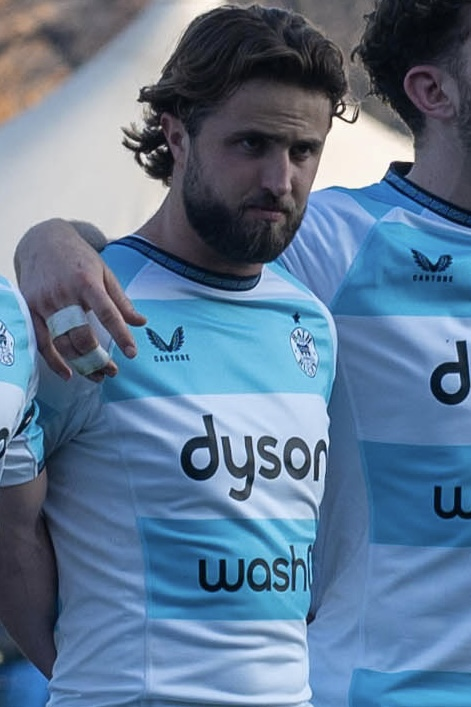
- De Glanville ahead of Bath Rugby's match against Benetton Treviso, December 2024
- Born: Thomas Michael de Glanville; 10 December 1999 (age 26) Bath, England
- Height: 1.88 m (6 ft 2 in)
- Weight: 84 kg (13 st 3 lb; 185 lb)
- School: Beechen Cliff School
- Notable relative: Phil de Glanville (father)

Rugby union career
- Position(s): Fly-half, Fullback
- Current team: Bath
Senior career
Years	Team	Apps	(Points)
2019–	Bath	114	(203)
- Correct as of 1 May 2026
International career
Years	Team	Apps	(Points)
2017–2018	England U18	5	(22)
2019	England U20	9	(10)
- Correct as of 22 June 2019

Thomas Michael de Glanville (born 10 December 1999) is an English professional rugby union player who plays at fly-half or fullback for Bath Rugby in the Gallagher Premiership.

== Early life and education ==
De Glanville is the son of Yolanda and Phil de Glanville, a former rugby player and captain of the England national rugby union team.

He was born in Bath, attended school at Beechen Cliff School in Bath and joined Bath Rugby academy. After attaining 3 As at A-Level, he then moved to the University of Leeds to study Biology and was loaned to National League 2 North side Otley R.U.F.C. on a dual-registration whilst studying there. De Glanville then transferred to the University of Bath in order to keep training with Bath academy.

== Rugby playing career ==
=== Club ===
In 2019, de Glanville captained Bath at the Premiership Sevens. Later in the year, he signed his first senior contract to play for the Bath Rugby senior team. He made his Premiership Rugby debut against Exeter Chiefs in September 2019.

=== International ===
In the summer of 2017, De Glanville was a member of the England under-18 team that toured South Africa and the following year, he scored two tries against Wales under-18 at Sardis Road. He scored a try for England under-20 against Scotland in the final round of the 2019 Six Nations Under 20s Championship. Later that year, he was a member of the squad that finished fifth at the 2019 World Rugby Under 20 Championship and scored a try during the pool stage against Australia.

In October 2020, he was called up to a senior England training squad by head coach Eddie Jones.

=== Playing positions and style ===
De Glanville has played in several positions in the backs. The Bath coach Todd Blackadder once said that de Glanville would play well at fly-half. However de Glanville often plays as a centre, following in his father's footsteps and having played there through several England age groups. He has also played at full-back for Bath United in the Premiership "A" League, and the Premiership.

De Glanville has expressed hope that his relatively low body weight may increase somewhat with age.

=== Disciplinary record ===
De Glanville was one of 13 players who breached COVID-19 virus safety protocols by leaving their hotel without permission before a Barbarians game in 2020.
