= 2025–26 PREM Rugby Cup =

Rugby union cup competition

- Countries: England
- Number of teams: 10
- Date: 12 September 2025 –15 March 2026
- Champions: Leicester Tigers (1st title)
- Runners-up: Exeter Chiefs
- Matches played: 36
- Tries scored: 288 (average 8 per match)
- Top point scorer: (England) Louie Johnson (Saracens) (France) Anthony Belleau (Northampton) – 51 points
- Top try scorer: (England) Campbell Ridl (Exeter) – 8 tries

Official website
- www.premiershiprugby.com

The 2025–26 PREM Rugby Cup is the 53rd season of England's national rugby union cup competition and the first in two season without clubs from the second tier, Champ Rugby.

Leicester Tigers won the PREM Rugby Cup defeating Exeter Chiefs 66–14 in the final at Welford Road, Leicester on 14 March 2026.

== Competition format ==
The format features all ten clubs from the 2025–26 Premiership Rugby. The ten teams are divided into two pools, each made up of five teams, playing eight games (four home, and four away) over ten rounds. The top two teams from each pool progress to the semi-finals, with the final being held one week after the semi-finals. After two seasons, the Champ Rugby clubs withdrew in protest, because they were not made equal partners in the development of the competition.

== Teams ==
All ten clubs from 2025–26 Premiership Rugby competed.

== Pools ==
Each team play home and away matches against the other teams in the pool.

League points follow normal rules, 4 for a win, 2 for a draw, 0 for a loss, and bonus points for 4 tries or more and/or losing by 7 or less match points.

- On completion of the pool stage, each club will be ranked within its pool according to the following criteria:
1. The club with the greater number of league points will be ranked higher.
2. If league points are equal, the club with the most wins will be ranked higher.
3. If the number of wins is equal, the club with the superior points difference (points for minus points against) will be ranked higher.
4. If the points difference is equal, the club with the greater number of points scored will be ranked higher.
5. If points scored are equal, the club with the greater number of tries will be ranked higher.
6. If the number of tries is equal, the club with the fewest red cards will be ranked higher.
7. If the number of red cards is equal, the club that scored more points in the match between the tied clubs will be ranked higher.
8. If that match was also tied on points, the tournament director will conduct a draw between the tied clubs, with the first club drawn deemed the higher‑ranked.

=== Pool A ===
2025–26 PREM Rugby Cup Pool A table
Pos	Team	Pld	W	D	L	PF	PA	PD	TF	TA	TB	LB	Pts	Qualification
1	Exeter Chiefs	8	6	0	2	247	176	+71	39	24	4	0	28	Qualifies for play-offs
2	Bath	8	5	0	3	250	161	+89	40	24	5	1	26	Qualifies for play-offs
3	Gloucester	8	5	0	3	200	211	−11	30	34	5	0	25	
4	Sale Sharks	8	3	0	5	177	265	−88	28	42	4	1	17	
5	Bristol Bears	8	1	0	7	194	255	−61	29	39	3	2	9	

Updated to match(es) played on 28 February 2026. Source: PREM Rugby

==== Round 1 ====
12 September 2025
19:30

(1 BP) Gloucester	29–15	Exeter Chiefs
Try: Ludlow 21' c Llewellyn 36' c Edwards-Giraud 55' m Innard 62' c Con: Byrne (3/4) 21', 37', 63'; Pen: Barton (1/1) 75'	Report	Try: Pearson 12' m Tuima 33' m Roots 40+1' m

Kingsholm

13 September 2025
15:00

(1 BP) Sale Sharks	24–15	Bristol Bears
Try: O'Flaherty 27' m Jibulu 49' c Hanson 53' c Davies 75' m Con: Curtis (2/4) 50', 54'	Report	Try: Jenkins 24' c Carrington 40' m Con: MacGinty (1/2) 24'; Pen: MacGinty (1/1) 70'

CorpAcq Stadium
Referee: Matthew Carley

Bye/s: Bath

==== Round 2 ====
19 September 2025
19:30

(1 BP) Gloucester	24–40	Bristol Bears (1 BP)
Try: W. Knight 3' m M. Knight 57' c Davies 63' c Caven 74' m Con: Barton (2/4) 58', 63'	Report	Try: Oghre (2) 12' m, 41' c Rees-Zammit 20' c Grahamslaw 25' c Owen 33' c Pearce 51' c Con: MacGinty (3/4) 22', 26', 34'; Worsley (2/2) 42' c, 52'

Kingsholm

20 September 2025
15:05

Bath	14–23	Exeter Chiefs
Try: Cowan 31' c Hennessey 63' c Con: Linegar (2/2) 32', 64'	Report	Try: John 58' m Dweba 75' m Varney 78' c Con: Slade (1/3) 79'; Pen: Slade (2/2) 3', 34'

Recreation Ground
Referee: Craig Maxwell-Keys

Bye/s: Sale Sharks

==== Round 3 ====
31 October 2025
19:45

Bristol Bears	19–49	Bath (1 BP)
Try: Gwilliam (2) 11' m, 64' c Bevan 45' c Con: Weston (2/3) 46', 64'	Report	Try: Tuipulotu (2) 14' c, 60' c Sela 17' c Green 38' c C. Griffin (2) 41' c, 55' c Butt 72' c Con: de Glanville (7/7) 15', 17', 39', 42', 55', 61', 73'

Ashton Gate
Referee: Harry Walbaum

2 November 2025
15:00

(2 BP) Sale Sharks	28–29	Gloucester (1 BP)
Try: Wilson 15' c Roberts 36' c Harper 56' c Thomas 80+2' c Con: Curtis (4/4) 16', 37', 37', 80+3'	Report	Try: James (2) 5' c, 75' m Cotgreave 29' c Trenholm 39' c Con: Barton (3/4) 6', 30', 40'; Pen: Barton (1/1) 70'

CorpAcq Stadium
Referee: Sara Cox

Bye/s: Exeter Chiefs

==== Round 4 ====
14 November 2025
19:30

Gloucester	19–17	Bath (1 BP)
Try: Hathaway 13' c Freeman-Price 27' c W. Knight 40+2' m Con: Barton (2/3) 15', 28'	Report	Try: Emens 2' c Staddon 20' m Offiah 55' m Con: Linegar (1/3) 3'

Kingsholm
Referee: Hamish Grant

14 November 2025
19:45

(1 BP) Sale Sharks	34–3	Exeter Chiefs
Try: Dugdale (2) 33' m, 42' c Caine 53' c McElroy 61' c O'Flaherty 65' m Con: R. du Preez (3/5) 43', 54', 62'; Pen: R. du Preez (1/1) 29'	Report	Pen: Coen (1/1) 23'

CorpAcq Stadium
Referee: Harry Walbaum

Bye/s: Bristol Bears

==== Round 5 ====
22 November 2025
15:00

(1 BP) Bath	20–0	Sale Sharks
Try: Frost 2' m de Glanville 24' m Green 34' m Butt 69' m	Report

Recreation Ground
Referee: Joe James

22 November 2025
15:00

Exeter Chiefs	22–17	Bristol Bears (1 BP)
Try: Rigg 2' c Gulley 30' m Ridl 58' c Con: Haydon-Wood (2/3) 3', 59'; Pen: Haydon-Wood (1/1) 66'	Report	Try: Boshoff (2) 34' c, 72' c Con: Worsley (2/2) 35', 73'; Pen: Worsley (1/1) 38'

Sandy Park
Referee: Richard Gordon

Bye/s: Gloucester

==== Round 6 ====
31 January 2026
15:00

(1 BP) Exeter Chiefs	59–14	Sale Sharks
Try: Rigg 5' c Heaven 29' c Goodrick-Clarke 31' c Pearson 33' m Tuima (2) 47' c, 66' c Iosefa-Scott 50' c Moloney 60' c Ridl 78' m Con: Hodge (7/9) 6', 30', 32', 48', 51', 61', 67'	Report	Try: Wehr 14' c J. Bedlow 20' c Con: Curtis (2/2) 15', 21'

Sandy Park
Referee: Jamie Parr

1 February 2026
15:00

Bristol Bears	8–16	Gloucester
Try: Lane 16' m Pen: Worsley (1/1) 34'	Report	Try: Austin 10' c Con: Barton (1/1) 11'; Pen: Barton (3/4) 45', 52', 79'

Ashton Gate
Referee: Harry Walbaum

Bye/s: Bath

==== Round 7 ====
7 February 2026
14:00

(1 BP) Bristol Bears	35–46	Exeter Chiefs (1 BP)
Try: Owen 40' c Pepper 47' c Lane 51' c Gwilliam 70' c Worsley 80' c Con: Worsley (5/5) 40+1', 48', 52', 71', 80+1'	Report	Try: Ridl (3) 4' m, 32' m, 55' c John 11' c Norey (2) 28' m, 43' m Brown-Bampoe 64' m Pearson 76' c Con: Hodge (1/4) 12'; Haydon-Wood (2/4) 56', 77'

Ashton Gate
Referee: Sara Cox

8 February 2026
15:00

Sale Sharks	19–60	Bath (1 BP)
Try: Jibulu (2) 26' c, 45' c Bradshaw 80+2' m Con: Curtis (2/3) 27', 46'	Report	Try: Green (2) 14' c, 58' c Frost (3) 20' m, 31' c, 48' m C. Griffin 35' c Timmins (2) 66' m, 74' m Spandler 71' c Mason 78' m Con: Roue (5/8) 15', 32', 36', 59', 72'

CorpAcq Stadium

Bye/s: Gloucester

==== Round 8 ====
14 February 2026
14:00

(1 BP) Exeter Chiefs	48–14	Gloucester
Try: Ridl (3) 5' c, 55' m, 59' c Wimbush (2) 40' c, 69' c Goodrick-Clarke 43' m E. Roots 67' m Brown-Bampoe 71' m Con: Skinner (4/8) 6', 40+1', 60', 70'	Report	Try: M. Knight 18' c Alemanno 37' c Con: Barton (2/2) 19', 38'

Sandy Park
Referee: Richard Gordon

14 February 2026
15:00

(1 BP) Bath	33–24	Bristol Bears
Try: Green (2) 27' c, 68' c Timmins 30' c C. Griffin (2) 57' m, 59' c Con: Emens (1/1) 28'; Roue (3/4) 31', 60', 69'	Report	Try: Pepper 23' c Ibitoye 34' c Randall 65' c Con: Worsley (3/3) 24', 35', 66'; Pen: Worsley (1/1) 44'

Recreation Ground
Referee: Hamish Grant

Bye/s: Sale Sharks

==== Round 9 ====
20 February 2026
19:45

(1 BP) Gloucester	43–17	Sale Sharks
Try: Redshaw (2) 7' m, 62' c Blake 18' c C. Atkinson 36' c Eite 51' m Trenholm 59' c Hathaway 75' m Con: C. Atkinson (4/5)	Report	Try: Wills (2) 50' m, 78' m Caine 65' c Con: Curtis (1/2) 66'

Kingsholm
Referee: Harry Walbaum

21 February 2026
16:30

(1 BP) Exeter Chiefs	31–19	Bath
Try: John (2) 17' m, 29' c Woodburn 21' c Wimbush 50' m J. Roots 72' c Con: Skinner (2/4) 22', 30'; Slade (1/1) 74'	Report	Try: Butt 7' c Winters 54' c Frost 78' m Con: Roue (2/2) 8', 55'

Sandy Park
Referee: Joe James

Bye/s: Bristol Bears

==== Round 10 ====
28 February 2026
15:00

(1 BP) Bath	38–26	Gloucester (1 BP)

Recreation Ground

28 February 2026
15:00

(2 BP) Bristol Bears	36–41	Sale Sharks (1 BP)

Ashton Gate

Bye/s: Exeter Chiefs

=== Pool B ===
2025–26 PREM Rugby Cup Pool B table
Pos	Team	Pld	W	D	L	PF	PA	PD	TF	TA	TB	LB	Pts	Qualification
1	Leicester Tigers	8	7	0	1	203	166	+37	31	26	6	0	34	Qualifies for play-offs
2	Northampton Saints	8	6	0	2	275	216	+59	40	34	6	0	30	Qualifies for play-offs
3	Saracens	8	3	0	5	264	211	+53	41	33	7	3	22	
4	Harlequins	8	2	0	6	198	250	−52	32	38	4	1	13	
5	Newcastle Red Bulls	8	2	0	6	131	228	−97	20	33	2	1	11	

Updated to match(es) played on 28 February 2026. Source: PREM Rugby

==== Round 1 ====
12 September 2025
19:45

(1 BP) Newcastle Red Bulls	26–14	Harlequins
Try: McGuigan 15' c McCallum 40+1' c Spencer 53' c Hearle 62' c Con: Connon (3/4) 16', 40+1', 54'	Report	Try: Bradley 35' c Riley 67' c Con: Benson (1/1) 36' c Kerr (1/1) 67'

Kingston Park
Referee: George Selwood

13 September 2025
15:00

(1 BP) Leicester Tigers	20–7	Saracens
Try: Blamire (2) 31' m, 52' m Ilione 63' m Wand 71' m	Report	Try: Michelow 3' c Con: Johnson (1/1) 4'

Mattioli Woods Welford Road

Bye/s: Northampton Saints

==== Round 2 ====
19 September 2025
19:30

(1 BP) Saracens	34–49	Northampton Saints (1 BP)
Try: Segun (2) 8' c, 39' c Malins 18' m J. Bracken (2) 45' c, 55' m Con: Johnson (3/5) 9', 40', 46'; Pen: Johnson (1/1) 6'	Report	Try: Chick (3) 3' c, 31' c, 37' c van der Mescht 21' c Wright 49' c Ramm (2) 56' c, 78' c Con: Belleau (7/7) 4', 22', 32', 38', 50', 57', 79'

StoneX Stadium
Referee: Adam Leal

19 September 2025
19:45

Harlequins	17–25	Leicester Tigers
Try: Els 4' m Walker (2) 44' m, 50' c Con: Evans (1/3) 51' c	Report	Try: Pearson 13' c Clare 37' c Crowley 66' m Con: Titcombe (2/2) 13', 37'; Pen: Titcombe (1/2) 23'; Woodward (1/1) 57'

Twickenham Stoop
Referee: Harry Walbaum

Bye/s: Newcastle Red Bulls

==== Round 3 ====
31 October 2025
19:45

(1 BP) Newcastle Red Bulls	8–10	Leicester Tigers
Try: Fletcher 6' m Pen: Connon (1/1) 67'	Report	Try: Pearson 48' c Con: Bailey (1/1) 49'; Pen: Bailey (1/1) 73'

Kingston Park
Referee: Joe James

1 November 2025
17:30

(1 BP) Northampton Saints	26–17	Harlequins
Try: Rowe 1' m Graham 34' c Brown 43' c Pater 45' c Con: Belleau (3/3) 34', 44', 46'	Report	Try: Cleaves 15' m Hyde 40+2' m Driscoll 75' c Con: Slevin (1/1) 75'

Franklin's Gardens
Referee: Alex Thomas

Bye/s: Saracens

==== Round 4 ====
15 November 2025
13:00

Northampton Saints	14–31	Newcastle Red Bulls (1 BP)
Try: Sleightholme 32' c Caqusau 37' c Con: Belleau (2/2) 33', 37'	Report	Try: Moore (3) 23' m, 52' c, 66' c Hutchison 55' m Lockwood 63' c Con: Connon (3/5) 53', 64', 67'

Franklin's Gardens
Referee: Jamie Parr

16 November 2025
15:00

Harlequins	21–46	Saracens (1 BP)
Try: Driscoll 8' c Murray 44' c Staples 66' c Con: Slevin (3/3) 9', 45', 67'	Report	Try: Jackson (2) 2' m, 14' m J. Bracken (2) 29' c, 35' m Hartley 32' c Spink 50' c Clarke 60' m Keylock 77' m Con: Johnson (3/8) 30', 33', 51'

Twickenham Stoop
Referee: George Selwood

Bye/s: Leicester Tigers

==== Round 5 ====
21 November 2025
19:30

(1 BP) Leicester Tigers	34–22	Northampton Saints
Try: Moro (2) 1' c, 40' c Whiteley 31' m Wand 57' c Allan 76' m Con: Searle (3/5) 2', 40+1', 58'; Pen: Searle (1/1) 66'	Report	Try: van der Mescht (2) 20' m, 26' c Scola 80+1' c Con: Furbank (1/2) 27'; Pater (1/1) 80+2'; Drop: Furbank (1/1) 34'

Mattioli Woods Welford Road

22 November 2025
14:00

(1 BP) Saracens	43–0	Newcastle Red Bulls
Try: Jackson 23' m Davidson 27' c Adegbemile 39' c Michelow 47' m C. Bracken 51' c van Zyl 65' c Hall 73' m Con: Johnson (4/7) 28', 40', 52', 66'	Report

StoneX Stadium
Referee: Harry Walbaum

Bye/s: Harlequins

==== Round 6 ====
30 January 2026
19:45

Newcastle Red Bulls	12–35	Saracens (1 BP)
Try: Clark 16' c Greenwood 65' m Con: Chamberlain (1/2) 17'	Report	Try: Wilson 8' c C. Bracken 40' c Hall 41' c Beaton 56' c Simpson 59' c Con: Johnson (5/5) 9', 40+1', 42', 57', 60'

Kingston Park
Referee: Richard Gordon

31 January 2026
15:00

(1 BP) Northampton Saints	40–22	Leicester Tigers (1 BP)
Try: McParland (2) 8' c, 14' c Martin 20' c Caqusau 31' c Walker 42' m Pater 46' c Con: Pater (5/6) 9', 15', 21', 32', 47'	Report	Try: Pearson 18' m Williams 57' m Clare 69' c McCarthy 80+2' m Con: O'Connor (1/4) 70'

Franklin's Gardens
Referee: George Selwood

Bye/s: Harlequins

==== Round 7 ====
6 February 2026
19:45

(1 BP) Leicester Tigers	28–19	Newcastle Red Bulls
Try: J. Manz 1' c Liebenberg 16' c Wand 53' c Perese 67' c Con: O'Connor (3/3) 2', 17', 54'; Whiteley (1/1) 68'	Report	Try: Rewcastle 6' m Cardall 13' c H. Obatoyinbo 63' c Con: E. Grayson (2/3) 14', 64'

Mattioli Woods Welford Road
Referee: Jamie Parr

7 February 2026
14:30

(2 BP) Saracens	40–43	Harlequins (1 BP)
Try: Jackson 1' c C. Bracken 16' c Willis 51' c Hartley 55' c Tompkins 59' c Kava 75' m Con: Johnson (5/6) 2', 17', 52', 56', 60'	Report	Try: Bradley 10' c Musk 19' m Browne 25' c Kolade 30' c Bellamy 40' c McCormack 62' m Lawday 78' m Con: Benson (4/5) 11', 26', 31', 40+1'

StoneX Stadium
Referee: George Selwood

Bye/s: Northampton Saints

==== Round 8 ====
13 February 2026
19:45

(1 BP) Harlequins	24–40	Northampton Saints (1 BP)
Try: Lawday 7' c Yendle 20' c Cleaves 28' m Anderson 48' m Con: Benson (2/4) 8', 21'	Report	Try: McParland (3) 30' c, 40' c, 71' c Belleau 55' c Sleightholme 62' m Penalty try 78'; Con: Belleau (4/5) 31', 40+1', 56', 72'

Twickenham Stoop
Referee: Harry Walbaum

14 February 2026
14:30

(2 BP) Saracens	26–31	Leicester Tigers (1 BP)
Try: Lozowski 8' c Adegbemile 15' c Segun (2) 21' c, 70' m Con: Johnson (3/3) 9', 16', 22'	Report	Try: Reffell (2) 12' c, 31' m Theobald-Thomas 47' m Allan 58' c J. Manz 77' c Con: Bailey (2/4) 13', 78'; Whiteley (1/1) 59'

StoneX Stadium
Referee: Alex Thomas

Bye/s: Newcastle Red Bulls

==== Round 9 ====
20 February 2026
19:45

Newcastle Red Bulls	21–49	Northampton Saints (1 BP)
Try: Obatoyinbo 5' c Palframan 69' c Fletcher 80+4' c Con: Connon (3/3) 6', 70', 80+5'	Report	Try: Green 12' c James 16' c Ulcoq 23' c Thame (2) 44' c, 51' c Hendy 66' c Sleightholme 75' c Con: Belleau (7/7) 13', 17', 24', 45', 52', 67', 76'

Kingston Park
Referee: Hamish Grant

21 February 2026
16:00

(1 BP) Leicester Tigers	33–27	Harlequins (2 BP)
Try: Blamire 7' c Wand (2) 36' c, 63' c Crowley 46' m Penalty try 71'; Con: Bailey (3/4) 8', 37', 64'	Report	Try: Bellamy (2) 4' m, 57' m Northmore (2) 13' m, 79' m Townsend 16' c Con: Benson (1/3) 17'

Mattioli Woods Welford Road

Bye/s: Saracens

==== Round 10 ====
28 February 2026
15:00

(1 BP) Harlequins	35–14	Newcastle Red Bulls

Twickenham Stoop

28 February 2026
15:05

(1 BP) Northampton Saints	35–33	Saracens (2 BP)

Franklin's Gardens

Bye/s: Leicester Tigers

== Semi-finals ==
8 March 2026

Exeter Chiefs	31–14	Northampton Saints
	Report

Sandy Park, Exeter

8 March 2026

Leicester Tigers	46–21	Bath
	Report

Welford Road, Leicester

== Final ==
15 March 2026
15:30

Leicester Tigers	66–14	Exeter Chiefs
Try: Wand (2), van der Flier (2), Searle (2), Penalty try, Hamer-Webb, Haffar, O'Connor; Con: Searle (6), O'Connor	Report	Try: Vintcent, Haydon-Wood; Con: Hodge (2)

Welford Road, Leicester
Referee: Hamish Smales

Team details

Leicester
Exeter

FB	15	(England) Orlando Bailey	(substituted off) 66'
RW	14	(Wales) Gabriel Hamer-Webb
OC	13	(England) Will Wand	(yellow card) 54'	(substituted off) 64'
IC	12	(England) Joseph Woodward
LW	11	(England) Ollie Hassell-Collins
FH	10	(England) Billy Searle	(substituted off) 49'
SH	9	(England) Tom Whiteley
LP	1	(England) Archie van der Flier	(substituted off) 49'
HK	2	(England) Charlie Clare	(substituted off) 49'
TP	3	(Scotland) Will Hurd	(substituted off) 49'
LK	4	(England) Harry Wells
LK	5	(South Africa) Hanro Liebenberg	(substituted off) 60'
BF	6	(England) Harry Palmer
OF	7	(Wales) Tommy Reffell (Captain)	(substituted off) 49'
N8	8	(Argentina) Joaquin Moro
Substitutions:
HK	16	(England) Finn Theobald-Thomas	(substituted on) 49'
PR	17	(England) Tarek Haffar	(substituted on) 49'
PR	18	(Sweden) Ale Loman	(substituted on) 49'
LK	19	(Wales) Osian Thomas	(substituted on) 60'
FL	20	(England) Joshua Manz	(substituted on) 49'
SH	21	(England) Charlie Beamand	(substituted on) 66'
FH	22	(Australia) James O'Connor	(substituted on) 49'
CE	23	(Australia) Izaia Perese	(substituted on) 64'
Coach:
(England) Geoff Parling

FB	15	(England) Josh Hodge
RW	14	(England) Paul Brown-Bampoe
OC	13	(England) Ollie Batson
IC	12	(England) Will Rigg
LW	11	(England) Campbell Ridl	(substituted off) 72'
FH	10	(England) Will Haydon-Wood	(substituted off) 62'
SH	9	(England) Tom Cairns	(substituted off) 62'
LH	1	(South Africa) Ethan Burger	(substituted off) 49'
HK	2	(South Africa) Joseph Dweba	(substituted off) 49'
TH	3	(South Africa) Khwezi Mona	(substituted off) 49'
LK	4	(England) Lewis Pearson (Captain)	(substituted off) 57'
LK	5	(England) Rus Tuima
BF	6	(Ireland) Martin Moloney	(yellow card) 47'
OF	7	(England) Finn Worley-Brady
N8	8	(Italy) Ross Vintcent	(substituted off) 57'
Substitutions:
HK	16	(Australia) Julian Heaven	(substituted on) 49'
PR	17	(England) Will Goodrick-Clarke	(substituted on) 49'
PR	18	(England) Tom Gulley	(substituted on) 49'
LK	19	(England) Joe Bailey	(substituted on) 57'
FL	20	(Wales) Christ Tshiunza	(substituted on) 57'
SH	21	(Scotland) Charlie Chapman	(substituted on) 62'
FH	22	(England) Ben Coen	(substituted on) 62'
FB	23	(Wales) Dan John	(substituted on) 72'
Coach:
(England) Rob Baxter

Player of the Match:
Billy Searle (Leicester)

Assistant referees:
Harry Walbaum
George Selwood
Television match official:
Peter Allan

== Individual statistics ==
=== Top points scorers ===
As of 21 February 2026

Rank	Player	Club	Points
1	(France) Anthony Belleau	Northampton	51
1	(England) Louie Johnson	Saracens	51
3	(England) Campbell Ridl	Exeter	40
4	(England) Sam Worsley	Bristol	38
5	(England) George Barton	Gloucester	31
6	(England) Arthur Green	Bath	30
7	(England) Dan Frost	Bath	25
7	(England) Charlie Griffin	Bath	25
7	(England) Archie McParland	Northampton	25
7	(England) Will Wand	Leicester	25

=== Top try scorers ===
As of 21 February 2026

Rank	Player	Club	Tries
1	(England) Campbell Ridl	Exeter	8
2	(England) Arthur Green	Bath	6
3	(England) Dan Frost	Bath	5
3	(England) Charlie Griffin	Bath	5
3	(England) Archie McParland	Northampton	5
3	(England) Will Wand	Leicester	5
7	(England) Jack Bracken	Saracens	4
7	(England) Brandon Jackson	Saracens	4
7	(Wales) Dan John	Exeter	4
7	(England) Rotimi Segun	Saracens	4
