= 2026–27 Premiership Rugby =

Season in English rugby union

2026–27 PREM Rugby
- Countries: England
- Number of teams: 10
- Date: 25 September 2026 – 19 June 2027
- Matches played: 25
- Tries scored: 203 (average 8.1 per match)
- Top point scorer: Finn Russell, Bath (45)
- Top try scorer: Christian Wade, Newcastle (6)

Official website
- www.premiershiprugby.com

The 2026–27 PREM Rugby season, also known as 2026–27 Premiership Rugby and for sponsorship reasons 2026–27 Gallagher PREM Rugby, will be the 40th season of the top flight English domestic men's rugby union competition. The season will be the first to be contested under a franchise-based model, following the abolition of automatic promotion and relegation between the PREM and Champ Rugby from the start of the 2026–27 season. The competition will be broadcast by TNT Sports for the fourteenth consecutive year, with seven select matches, broadcast free-to-air on ITV.

== Background ==
=== Franchise model and end of promotion and relegation ===
On 27 February 2026, the Rugby Football Union council approved a reform of the structure of professional rugby in England. From the 2026–27 campaign, automatic promotion and relegation between the PREM and Champ Rugby is replaced by a criteria-based expansion and demotion model. Automatic promotion had effectively been dormant for several seasons, as Champ Rugby champions Ealing Trailfinders were repeatedly unable to meet the PREM's minimum stadium capacity criteria.

Relegation remains possible but will no longer be automatic, and would only occur where a stronger, financially viable replacement candidate exists.

== Teams ==
The same ten clubs that competed in the 2025–26 season will contest the 2026–27 season.

Club	Director of Rugby / Head Coach	Captain	Stadium	Capacity	City/Area
Bath	Johann van Graan	Ben Spencer	The Recreation Ground (Note: Bath will host two games away from The Recreation Ground during rounds 16 and 18 due to the redevelopment of the stadium.)	14,509	Bath, Somerset
Bristol Bears	Pat Lam	Fitz Harding	Ashton Gate (Note: Bristol will host the round 13 fixture against Gloucester at Millennium Stadium.)	27,000	Bristol
Exeter Chiefs	Rob Baxter	Dafydd Jenkins	Sandy Park	15,600	Exeter, Devon
Gloucester	Chris Boyd (Note: Technical Director); George Skivington	Dewi Lake	Kingsholm	16,115	Gloucester, Gloucestershire
Harlequins	Jason Gilmore	Alex Dombrandt	Twickenham Stoop (Note: Harlequins will host the round 8 fixture against Northampton and the round 15 fixture against Newcastle at Twickenham Stadium.)	14,800	Twickenham, Greater London
Leicester Tigers	Geoff Parling	Ollie Chessum	Welford Road	25,849	Leicester, Leicestershire
Newcastle Red Bulls	Dan McFarland	Tom Christie	Kingston Park	10,200	Newcastle upon Tyne, Tyne and Wear
Northampton Saints	Phil Dowson	Fraser Dingwall	Franklin's Gardens	15,249	Northampton, Northamptonshire
Sale Sharks	Alex Sanderson	Ernst van Rhyn	CorpAcq Stadium	12,000	Salford, Greater Manchester
Saracens	Brendan Venter (England) Joe Shaw	Maro Itoje	StoneX Stadium (Note: Saracens will host the round 11 fixture against Harlequins at Tottenham Hotspur Stadium.)	10,500	Hendon, Greater London

== Table ==
2026–27 PREM Rugby table
Pos	Team	Pld	W	D	L	PF	PA	PD	TF	TA	TB	LB	Pts	Qualification
1	Leicester Tigers	5	4	0	1	150	113	+37	22	15	4	1	21	Play-offs
2	Gloucester	5	3	0	2	161	95	+66	23	14	3	1	16	Play-offs
3	Northampton Saints	5	3	0	2	191	157	+34	29	23	4	0	16	Play-offs
4	Saracens	5	3	0	2	141	130	+11	23	19	3	1	16	Play-offs
5	Bath	5	3	0	2	162	173	−11	24	25	4	0	16	TBC
6	Bristol Bears	5	3	0	2	118	109	+9	15	16	2	1	15	TBC
7	Harlequins	5	2	0	3	105	152	−47	17	24	3	1	12	TBC
8	Sale Sharks	5	2	0	3	104	128	−24	14	19	2	0	10	TBC
9	Exeter Chiefs	5	1	0	4	127	164	−37	19	24	4	2	10	TBC
10	Newcastle Red Bulls	5	1	0	4	121	159	−38	17	24	3	2	9	TBC

Updated to match(es) played on 31 October 2026. Source: PREM Rugby
Rules for classification: Tiebreakers for teams tied on points: 1) Number of matches won; 2) Difference between points for and against; 3) Total number of points for; 4) Aggregate number of points scored in matches between tied teams; 5) Number of matches won excluding the first match, then the second and so on until the tie is settled.

=== Round-by-round progression ===
The grid below shows each team's progression throughout the season, indicating their points total (and league table position) at the end of every round:

Team Progression
Team	R1	R2	R3	R4	R5	R6	R7	R8	R9	R10	R11	R12	R13	R14	R15	R16	R17	R18
Leicester Tigers	2 (6th)	6 (5th)	11 (4th)	16 (2nd)	21 (1st)													
Gloucester	5 (2nd)	10 (1st)	12 (1st)	16 (1st)	16 (2nd)													
Northampton Saints	5 (1st)	6 (4th)	11 (2nd)	11 (4th)	16 (3rd)													
Saracens	5 (5th)	6 (6th)	11 (3rd)	11 (5th)	16 (4th)													
Bath	5 (3rd)	10 (3rd)	11 (5th)	11 (6th)	16 (5th)													
Bristol Bears	5 (4th)	10 (2nd)	10 (6th)	14 (3rd)	15 (6th)													
Harlequins	0 (10th)	0 (10th)	2 (10th)	7 (10th)	12 (7th)													
Sale Sharks	0 (9th)	4 (7th)	9 (7th)	9 (7th)	10 (8th)													
Exeter Chiefs	1 (7th)	3 (8th)	8 (8th)	8 (9th)	10 (9th)													
Newcastle Red Bulls	1 (8th)	2 (9th)	4 (9th)	8 (8th)	9 (10th)													
Updated: 31 October 2026

Key
Win	Draw	Loss

== Regular season ==
The regular season fixtures were announced on 28 July 2026.

Highlights of the season include:

- Derby Weekends – All fixtures scheduled for Round 4 are derby matches between local rivals – the Northern Derby (Sale Sharks v Newcastle Red Bulls), the West Country Derbies (Bristol Bears v Exeter Chiefs and Gloucester v Bath), the East Midlands Derby (Northampton Saints v Leicester Tigers), and the London Derby (Harlequins v Saracens).
- Slater Cup – Leicester Tigers and Gloucester will contest the Slater Cup at Welford Road on 9 October 2026, and at Kingsholm Stadium on 28 March 2027, in honour of former Leicester and Gloucester player Ed Slater.
- Big Game 18 – Harlequins will host Northampton Saints in this season's edition of The Big Game at Twickenham Stadium on 28 December 2026, during Round 8.
- The Showdown 7 – Saracens will host Harlequins in this season's edition of The Showdown on 20 March 2027, during Round 11.
- Big Summer Kick-Off 7 – Harlequins will host Newcastle Red Bulls in this season's edition of the Big Summer Kick-Off at Twickenham Stadium in May 2027, during Round 15.
- Big Day Out – Bristol Bears will host Gloucester in the third edition of the Big Day Out at Millennium Stadium in April 2027, during Round 13.

Notes

- All fixtures are subject to change.
- Referees appointed to officiate Premiership matches are employed by the RFU, unless indicated otherwise.

=== Results ===
Home \ Away	BAT	BRI	EXE	GLO	HAR	LEI	NEW	NOR	SAL	SAR
Bath	—	4 Dec	40–34	19/20/21; Mar	14/15/16; May	26 Dec	16/17/18; Apr	22/23/24; Jan	36–28	4/5/6; Jun
Bristol Bears	28/29/30; May	—	20–7	17 Apr	20 Dec	16–22	26 Dec	41–26	19/20/21; Mar	7/8/9; May
Exeter Chiefs	7/8/9; May	22/23/24; Jan	—	24–45	28–31	28/29/30; May	34–28	19/20/21; Mar	16/17/18; Apr	27 Dec
Gloucester	23–5	1 Jan	4/5/6; Jun	—	48–0	26/27/28; Mar	5 Dec	23/24/25; Apr	7/8/9; May	19 Dec
Harlequins	17–33	23/24/25; Apr	26/27/28; Mar	22/23/24; Jan	—	5 Dec	7/8/9; May	28 Dec	28/29/30; May	33–15
Leicester Tigers	23/24/25; Apr	14/15/16; May	2 Jan	38–31	4/5/6; Jun	—	19/20/21; Mar	28–7	19 Dec	38–40
Newcastle Red Bulls	18 Dec	26/27/28; Mar	23/24/25; Apr	14/15/16; May	2 Jan	19–24	—	28/29/30; May	17–3	22/23/24; Jan
Northampton Saints	71–48	4/5/6; Jun	19 Dec	28–14	16/17/18; Apr	7/8/9; May	59–26	—	3 Jan	26/27/28; Mar
Sale Sharks	26/27/28; Mar	24–34	6 Dec	26 Dec	28–24	22/23/24; Jan	4/5/6; Jun	14/15/16; May	—	23/24/25; Apr
Saracens	2 Jan	30–7	14/15/16; May	28/29/30; May	19/20/21; Mar	16/17/18; Apr	39–31	5 Dec	17–21	—

Updated to match(es) played on 31 October 2026. Source: PREM Rugby
Legend: Blue = home team win; Yellow = draw; Red = away team win.

=== Round 1 ===
25 September 2026
19:45 BST

Harlequins	17–33	Bath (1 BP)
Try: Porter 16' m Cunningham-South 25' m Delgado 44' c Con: Slevin (1/3) 45'	Report	Try: du Preez 12' c Cokanasiga 20' c Carreras 32' c Frost 40+2' c Richards 71' m Con: Russell (4/5) 13', 21', 33', 40+3'

Twickenham Stoop
Referee: Karl Dickson

25 September 2026
19:45 BST

(1 BP) Northampton Saints	59–26	Newcastle Red Bulls (1 BP)
Try: Pater (3) 3' c, 14' m, 76' c Hendy 22' c Freeman (3) 24' m, 48' c, 61' c Coles 39' c Sleightholme 73' c Con: F. Smith (5/7) 4', 22', 40', 49', 62'; Belleau (2/2) 74', 77'	Report	Try: Wade (2) 11' c, 37' c Jordan 57' c Kok 79' m Con: Connon (1/1) 12'; Henry (2/3) 39', 58'

Franklin's Gardens
Referee: Anthony Woodthorpe

26 September 2026
15:05 BST

(1 BP) Exeter Chiefs	24–45	Gloucester (1 BP)
Try: Iosefa-Scott 14' c Roots 37' m Varney 61' c Gulley 75' m Con: Slade (2/4) 15', 62'	Report	Try: Loader (2) 4' m, 22' c S. Atkinson 18' c Lake (2) 40' c, 45' m Joseph 59' c Denny 80' c Con: C. Atkinson (4/6) 19', 23', 40+2', 60'; Barton (1/1) 80+1'

Sandy Park
Referee: Matthew Carley

26 September 2026
17:30 BST

Sale Sharks	24–34	Bristol Bears (1 BP)
Try: Cowan-Dickie 6' c O'Flaherty (2) 42' c, 68' c Con: Ford (3/3) 7', 43', 69'; Pen: Ford (1/1) 15'	Report	Try: Rees-Zammit (2) 12' m, 23' m Randall (2) 38' c, 56' c Gwilliam 72' c Con: Williams (3/5) 39', 57', 73'; Pen: Williams (1/1) 31'

CorpAcq Stadium
Referee: Sara Cox

27 September 2026
15:00 BST

(2 BP) Leicester Tigers	38–40	Saracens (1 BP)
Try: Kata 15' c Hamer-Webb (3) 26' m, 44' m, 50' c Radwan 53' c Thompson 66' c Con: Searle (4/6) 16', 51', 54', 67'	Report	Try: González 1' c Elliott 9' c Daly 33' c Earl 47' c Segun (2) 60' c, 72' m Con: Burke (5/6) 2', 10', 34', 48', 61'

Welford Road
Referee: Ian Tempest

=== Round 2 ===
2 October 2026
19:45 BST

(1 BP) Bath	40–34	Exeter Chiefs (2 BP)
Try: Redpath 11' c van der Linde 17' c du Preez 30' m Russell 40' c Penalty try 61'; Hill 68' c Con: Russell (4/5) 12', 18', 41', 69'	Report	Try: Varney 24' m Yeandle 33' m Iosefa-Scott 45' c Feyi-Waboso (2) 48' c, 54' c Con: Slade (3/5) 46', 49', 55'; Pen: Skinner (1/1) 78'

The Recreation Ground
Referee: Luke Pearce

3 October 2026
15:05 BST

(1 BP) Bristol Bears	41–26	Northampton Saints (1 BP)
Try: Oghre 6' m Rees-Zammit (2) 35' c, 60' m Jordan 42' c Randall 51' c Penalty try 80'; Con: Williams (3/5) 36', 43', 52'; Pen: Williams (1/2) 15'	Report	Try: Hendy (2) 9' c, 40+1' c Mitchell 63' c Kemeny 67' m Con: F. Smith (3/4) 10', 40+2', 64'

Ashton Gate
Referee: Ian Tempest

3 October 2026
17:30 BST

(1 BP) Gloucester	48–0	Harlequins
Try: Loader 10' m Morgan 17' m Trenholm 29' c C. Atkinson 34' c S. Atkinson 41' c Englefield 44' m Joseph 51' c Barton 56' m Con: Barton (4/8) 30', 35', 42', 52'	Report

Kingsholm
Referee: Sara Cox

3 October 2026
19:45 BST

(1 BP) Newcastle Red Bulls	19–24	Leicester Tigers
Try: Ene 2' m McGuigan 55' c Jordan 73' c Con: Connon (1/2) 56'; Henry (1/1) 74'	Report	Try: Moli 11' c Radwan 21' c Hurd 67' c Con: Searle (3/3) 12', 22', 68'; Pen: Searle (1/1) 28'

Kingston Park
Referee: Christophe Ridley

4 October 2026
15:00 BST

(1 BP) Saracens	17–21	Sale Sharks
Try: Mawi 33' m Va'enuku 45' m C. Bracken 72' c Con: Burke (1/3) 72'	Report	Try: Jibulu 6' c O'Flaherty 41' c Bamber 64' c Con: Ford (2/2) 7', 42'; Lozowski (1/1) 65'

StoneX Stadium
Referee: Joe James

=== Round 3 ===
9 October 2026
19:45 BST

(1 BP) Leicester Tigers	38–31	Gloucester (2 BP)
Try: Carnduff 14' c Heyes 28' c Blamire 35' c Wainwright 50' c Hassell-Collins 69' c Con: Searle (5/5) 15', 29', 35', 51', 70'; Pen: Searle (1/1) 47'	Report	Try: Morgan 3' c Bleuler 8' c Trenholm 59' c Innard 79' c Con: Englefield (2/2) 4', 9'; Barton (2/2) 60', 79'; Pen: Barton (1/1) 80+2'

Welford Road
Referee: Karl Dickson

10 October 2026
15:05 BST

(1 BP) Northampton Saints	71–48	Bath (1 BP)
Try: Smith 6' m Sleightholme (3) 15' c, 59' m, 63' c Freeman (2) 27' c, 76' c Dingwall 35' c Pater 44' c Kemeny 50' m Mitchell 55' c Coles 67' c Con: Smith (8/11) 16', 27', 36', 45', 56', 63', 67', 77'	Report	Try: Carr-Smith 9' c C. Griffin 12' c A. Griffin 29' m Green (2) 31' c, 41' c Carreras 48' m Bayliss 64' c Con: Russell (5/7) 10', 13', 32', 42', 65'; Pen: Russell (1/1) 40'

Franklin's Gardens
Referee: Matthew Carley

10 October 2026
17:30 BST

(1 BP) Saracens	30–7	Bristol Bears
Try: Caluori 4' m O'Driscoll 51' c Penalty try 60'; J. Bracken 63' m Con: Farrell (1/3) 52'; Pen: Farrell (2/2) 9', 25'	Report	Try: Randall 46' c Con: Williams (1/1) 47'

StoneX Stadium
Referee: Anthony Woodthorpe

11 October 2026
15:00 BST

(1 BP) Sale Sharks	28–24	Harlequins (2 BP)
Try: Canakaivata 10' c Warr 37' c Bamber 62' c Penalty try 72'; Con: Ford (3/3) 11', 38', 63'	Report	Try: Riley (2) 2' m, 52' c Smith (2) 7' m, 18' c Con: Smith (2/4) 19', 53'

CorpAcq Stadium
Referee: Christophe Ridley

11 October 2026
15:00 BST

(1 BP) Exeter Chiefs	34–28	Newcastle Red Bulls (2 BP)
Try: Vintcent (2) 1' c, 8' m Slade 19' c Harris 44' c Tchumbadze 75' m Con: Slade (3/5) 2', 20', 45'; Pen: Slade (1/1) 64'	Report	Try: Wade (3) 4' c, 34' c, 48' c Hicks 13' c Con: Henry (4/4) 5', 14', 35', 49'

Sandy Park
Referee: George Selwood

=== Round 4 (Derby Weekend) ===
23 October 2026
19:45 BST

Gloucester	23–5	Bath
Try: Thomas 53' c Llewellyn 78' c Con: Barton (2/2) 54', 79'; Pen: Barton (3/3) 31', 36', 38'	Report	Try: Tuipulotu 40' m

Kingsholm
Referee: Christophe Ridley

23 October 2026
19:45 BST

Newcastle Red Bulls	17–3	Sale Sharks
Try: Wade 48' c McGuigan 62' c Con: Hodge (2/2) 49', 63'; Pen: Hodge (1/1) 59'	Report	Pen: Ford (1/1) 19'

Kingston Park
Referee: Matthew Carley

24 October 2026
15:05 BST

(1 BP) Leicester Tigers	28–7	Northampton Saints
Try: Blamire 43' m Henderson 51' m Carnduff 71' c Con: Searle (1/4) 72'; Pen: Steward (1/1) 18'; Searle (1/1) 66'	Report	Try: Pater 6' c Con: F. Smith (1/1) 7'

Welford Road
Referee: Craig Maxwell-Keys

24 October 2026
17:30 BST

Bristol Bears	20–7	Exeter Chiefs
Try: Ibitoye 26' c Ivanishvili 78' c Con: Williams (2/2) 27', 79'; Pen: Williams (2/2) 29', 76'	Report	Try: Fisilau 52' c Con: Slade (1/1) 53'

Ashton Gate
Referee: Karl Dickson

25 October 2026
15:00 BST

(1 BP) Harlequins	33–15	Saracens
Try: Smith 2' c Driscoll 14' c Penalty try 23'; Murley 36' m Porter 54' c Con: Smith (3/4) 3', 15', 55'	Report	Try: Segun 18' m Dan 40+1' m Tompkins 61' m

Twickenham Stoop
Referee: Hamish Smales

=== Round 5 ===
30 October 2026
19:45 GMT

(1 BP) Bristol Bears	16–22	Leicester Tigers (1 BP)
Try: Rees-Zammit 5' c Con: Williams 6'; Pen: Williams (3/3) 44', 59', 72'	Report	Try: Steward 10' c Radwan 36' m Hassell-Collins 41' m Blamire 63' m Con: Searle (1/4) 11'

Ashton Gate
Referee: Luke Pearce

31 October 2026
15:00 GMT

(2 BP) Exeter Chiefs	28–31	Harlequins (1 BP)
Try: Wilson 17' c Abuladze 38' c Butt 43' c Woodburn 78' c Con: Slade (4/4) 18', 39', 44', 79'	Report	Try: Murley 2' c David 10' c Schmid (2) 55' c, 67' m Kenningham 73' m Con: Smith (3/5) 3', 11', 56'

Sandy Park
Referee: Joe James

31 October 2026
15:00 GMT

(1 BP) Saracens	39–31	Newcastle Red Bulls (1 BP)
Try: George 21' c Va'enuku 44' m Knight 52' c Tompkins 55' m Caluori 61' m Daly 69' m Segun 72' m Con: Farrell (2/7) 22', 53'	Report	Try: Kok 10' c Graham 27' c Leatherbarrow 74' c Hearle 79' c Con: Hodge (4/4) 11', 28', 75', 80'; Pen: Hodge (1/1) 6'

StoneX Stadium
Referee: Ian Tempest

31 October 2026
15:05 GMT

(1 BP) Bath	36–28	Sale Sharks (1 BP)
Try: Arundell 2' c de Glanville 21' c Cokanasiga (2) 29' m, 42' c Hennessey 64' c Con: Russell (4/5) 3', 22', 43', 65'; Pen: Russell (1/2) 58'	Report	Try: Jibulu 13' c O'Flaherty 44' c Cowan-Dickie 71' c Canakaivata 79' c Con: Ford (4/4) 14', 45', 72', 80'

The Recreation Ground
Referee: Anthony Woodthorpe

31 October 2026
17:30 GMT

(1 BP) Northampton Saints	28–14	Gloucester
Try: Pearson 35' c Langdon 40+1' c Hendy 62' c Hutchinson 65' c Con: Belleau (4/4) 36', 40+2', 62', 65'	Report	Try: Llewellyn 8' c Joseph 30' c Con: Barton (2/2) 9', 31'

Franklin's Gardens
Referee: Sara Cox

=== Round 6 ===
4 December 2026
19:45 GMT

Bath	–	Bristol Bears

The Recreation Ground

5 December 2026
15:00 GMT

Gloucester	–	Newcastle Red Bulls

Kingsholm

5 December 2026
15:05 GMT

Harlequins	–	Leicester Tigers

Twickenham Stoop

5 December 2026
17:30 GMT

Saracens	–	Northampton Saints

StoneX Stadium

6 December 2026
15:00 GMT

Sale Sharks	–	Exeter Chiefs

CorpAcq Stadium

=== Round 7 ===
18 December 2026
19:45 GMT

Newcastle Red Bulls	–	Bath

Kingston Park

19 December 2026
15:00 GMT

Gloucester	–	Saracens

Kingsholm

19 December 2026
15:05 GMT

Leicester Tigers	–	Sale Sharks

Welford Road

19 December 2026
17:30 GMT

Northampton Saints	–	Exeter Chiefs

Franklin's Gardens

20 December 2026
15:00 GMT

Bristol Bears	–	Harlequins

Ashton Gate

=== Round 8 ===
26 December 2026
15:00 GMT

Bristol Bears	–	Newcastle Red Bulls

Ashton Gate

26 December 2026
15:05 GMT

Bath	–	Leicester Tigers

The Recreation Ground

26 December 2026
17:30 GMT

Sale Sharks	–	Gloucester

CorpAcq Stadium

27 December 2026
15:05 GMT

Exeter Chiefs	–	Saracens

Sandy Park

28 December 2026
17:00 GMT

Harlequins	–	Northampton Saints

Twickenham Stadium

=== Round 9 ===
1 January 2027
19:45 GMT

Gloucester	–	Bristol Bears

Kingsholm

2 January 2027
15:05 GMT

Saracens	–	Bath

StoneX Stadium

2 January 2027
17:30 GMT

Leicester Tigers	–	Exeter Chiefs

Welford Road

2 January 2027
17:30 GMT

Newcastle Red Bulls	–	Harlequins

Kingston Park

3 January 2027
15:00 GMT

Northampton Saints	–	Sale Sharks

Franklin's Gardens

=== Round 10 ===
22/23/24 January 2027

Bath	–	Northampton Saints

The Recreation Ground

22/23/24 January 2027

Exeter Chiefs	–	Bristol Bears

Sandy Park

22/23/24 January 2027

Harlequins	–	Gloucester

Twickenham Stoop

22/23/24 January 2027

Newcastle Red Bulls	–	Saracens

Kingston Park

22/23/24 January 2027

Sale Sharks	–	Leicester Tigers

CorpAcq Stadium

=== Round 11 ===
19/20/21 March 2027

Bath	–	Gloucester

The Recreation Ground

19/20/21 March 2027

Bristol Bears	–	Sale Sharks

Ashton Gate

19/20/21 March 2027

Exeter Chiefs	–	Northampton Saints

Sandy Park

19/20/21 March 2027

Leicester Tigers	–	Newcastle Red Bulls

Welford Road

19/20/21 March 2027

Saracens	–	Harlequins

Tottenham Hotspur Stadium

=== Round 12 ===
26/27/28 March 2027

Gloucester	–	Leicester Tigers

Kingsholm

26/27/28 March 2027

Harlequins	–	Exeter Chiefs

Twickenham Stoop

26/27/28 March 2027

Newcastle Red Bulls	–	Bristol Bears

Kingston Park

26/27/28 March 2027

Northampton Saints	–	Saracens

Franklin's Gardens

26/27/28 March 2027

Sale Sharks	–	Bath

CorpAcq Stadium

=== Round 13 ===
16/17/18 April 2027

Bath	–	Newcastle Red Bulls

The Recreation Ground

17 April 2027
15:05 BST

Bristol Bears	–	Gloucester

Millennium Stadium

16/17/18 April 2027

Exeter Chiefs	–	Sale Sharks

Sandy Park

16/17/18 April 2027

Northampton Saints	–	Harlequins

Franklin's Gardens

16/17/18 April 2027

Saracens	–	Leicester Tigers

StoneX Stadium

=== Round 14 ===
23/24/25 April 2027

Gloucester	–	Northampton Saints

Kingsholm

23/24/25 April 2027

Harlequins	–	Bristol Bears

Twickenham Stoop

23/24/25 April 2027

Leicester Tigers	–	Bath

Welford Road

23/24/25 April 2027

Newcastle Red Bulls	–	Exeter Chiefs

Kingston Park

23/24/25 April 2027

Sale Sharks	–	Saracens

CorpAcq Stadium

=== Round 15 ===
7/8/9 May 2027

Bristol Bears	–	Saracens

Ashton Gate

7/8/9 May 2027

Exeter Chiefs	–	Bath

Sandy Park

7/8/9 May 2027

Gloucester	–	Sale Sharks

Kingsholm

7/8/9 May 2027

Harlequins	–	Newcastle Red Bulls

Twickenham Stadium

7/8/9 May 2027

Northampton Saints	–	Leicester Tigers

Franklin's Gardens

=== Round 16 ===
14/15/16 May 2027

Bath	–	Harlequins

TBC

14/15/16 May 2027

Leicester Tigers	–	Bristol Bears

Welford Road

14/15/16 May 2027

Newcastle Red Bulls	–	Gloucester

Kingston Park

14/15/16 May 2027

Sale Sharks	–	Northampton Saints

CorpAcq Stadium

14/15/16 May 2027

Saracens	–	Exeter Chiefs

StoneX Stadium

=== Round 17 ===
28/29/30 May 2027

Bristol Bears	–	Bath

Ashton Gate

28/29/30 May 2027

Exeter Chiefs	–	Leicester Tigers

Sandy Park

28/29/30 May 2027

Harlequins	–	Sale Sharks

Twickenham Stoop

28/29/30 May 2027

Newcastle Red Bulls	–	Northampton Saints

Kingston Park

28/29/30 May 2027

Saracens	–	Gloucester

StoneX Stadium

=== Round 18 ===
4/5/6 June 2027

Bath	–	Saracens

TBC

4/5/6 June 2027

Gloucester	–	Exeter Chiefs

Kingsholm

4/5/6 June 2027

Leicester Tigers	–	Harlequins

Welford Road

4/5/6 June 2027

Northampton Saints	–	Bristol Bears

Franklin's Gardens

4/5/6 June 2027

Sale Sharks	–	Newcastle Red Bulls

CorpAcq Stadium

== Play-offs ==
As in previous seasons, the top four teams in the Premiership table, following the conclusion of the regular season, will contest the play-off semi-finals in a 1st vs 4th and 2nd vs 3rd format, with the higher ranking team having home advantage. The two winners of the semi-finals will then meet in the Premiership Final at Allianz Stadium in Twickenham, London on 19 June 2027.

Semi-finals
11/12 June 2027
First in standings
Fourth in standings
11/12 June 2027
Second in standings
Third in standings

Final
19 June 2027 – Twickenham
Winner SF1
Winner SF2

=== Semi-finals ===
11/12 June 2027

First in standings	–	Fourth in standings

11/12 June 2027

Second in standings	–	Third in standings

=== Final ===
19 June 2027
15:00

Winner SF1	–	Winner SF2

Twickenham Stadium

== Leading scorers ==
Note: Flags to the left of player names indicate national team as has been defined under World Rugby eligibility rules, or primary nationality for players who have not yet earned international senior caps. Players may hold one or more non-WR nationalities.

=== Most points ===
As of 31 October 2026

Rank	Player	Club	Points
1	Finn Russell	Bath	45
2	James Williams	Bristol	41
3	George Barton	Gloucester	39
3	Fin Smith	Northampton	39
5	Billy Searle	Leicester	37
6	Henry Slade	Exeter	34
7	Marcus Smith	Harlequins	31
8	(England) George Ford	Sale	30
8	Christian Wade	Newcastle	30
10	Tommy Freeman	Northampton	25
10	James Pater	Northampton	25
10	Louis Rees-Zammit	Bristol	25

=== Most tries ===
As of 31 October 2026

Rank	Player	Club	Tries
1	Christian Wade	Newcastle	6
2	Tommy Freeman	Northampton	5
2	James Pater	Northampton	5
2	Louis Rees-Zammit	Bristol	5
5	George Hendy	Northampton	4
5	(England) Tom O'Flaherty	Sale	4
5	Harry Randall	Bristol	4
5	Rotimi Segun	Saracens	4
5	Ollie Sleightholme	Northampton	4
10	7 players tied		3

== Discipline ==
=== Citings/bans ===
Player	Match (Note: The cited player's club is listed in bold italics.)	Citing date	Law breached	Result	Ref
(England) Nick Isiekwe	Leicester vs. **Saracens** (27 September 2026)	29 September 2026	9.13 – Dangerous Tackling (Red card)	Red card rescinded	
(South Africa) Jacques Vermeulen	Saracens vs. **Sale** (4 October 2026)	6 October 2026	9.11 – Dangerous Play in a Ruck (Red card)	4-match ban	
(England) Jack Walker	Exeter vs. **Harlequins** (31 October 2026)	2 November 2026	9.27 – 2 Yellow Cards (Red card)	1-match ban	

== Awards ==
=== Player of the Month ===
The following players have received the Gallagher Premiership Player of the Month award during the 2025–26 season, as selected by a panel of media commentators, in addition to monthly public polls.

Month	Nominees	Club	Winner	Refs
October	(England) Ollie Chessum	Leicester	(Wales) **Jac Morgan**	
October	(England) Alex Coles	Northampton	(Wales) **Jac Morgan**	
October	(New Zealand) Max Hicks	Newcastle	(Wales) **Jac Morgan**	
October	(Wales) Jac Morgan	Gloucester	(Wales) **Jac Morgan**	

== Broadcast coverage ==
The competition will be broadcast by TNT Sports for the fourteenth consecutive year, all matches will be shown live on TNT Sports and HBO Max.

In addition, seven matches per season will be broadcast free-to-air on ITV, including the final, across ITV1 and ITVX. All matches broadcast on ITV will be simulcast from TNT Sports.
