= 2026–27 European Rugby Champions Cup pool stage =

European Rugby Champions Cup pool stage

The 2026–27 European Rugby Champions Cup pool stage will be the first of two stages of the 32nd season of the pan-European professional club rugby union competition. It will be the 13th under the European Rugby Champions Cup format. Twenty-four clubs from three major domestic and regional leagues will compete over four rounds of pool fixtures. 16 teams will be progressing to the second and final stage, the knockout stage.

== Structure ==
The pool stage draw took place on 1 July 2026, with the complete fixture list later announced on 10 July 2026. The fixtures will be played out across four weekends between 16 October 2026 and 17 January 2027.

Teams will play other teams in the same pool, except the other team from their own league, once either home or away. Each team will host two home games. The top three teams in each pool will progress to the round of 16. The four other round of 16 places will go to the four clubs with the highest number of points across all pools, regardless of which pool they are in. Four clubs that did not qualify for the round of 16 can progress to the knockout stages of the 2025–26 EPCR Challenge Cup. These will be the next four clubs with the highest number of points, also regardless of which pool they are in.

Teams will be awarded points based on match performances; four points for a win, two points for a draw, one attacking bonus point for scoring three or more tries more than their opposition, and one defensive bonus point for losing a match by seven points or fewer.

If two or more clubs in the same pool are equal on match points, their ranking will be determined as follows:

1. the best aggregate points difference from the pool stage; or
2. If equal, the number of tries scored in the pool stage; or
3. If equal, the club with the fewest number of players suspended for disciplinary incidents in the pool stage; or
4. If still equal, by drawing lots.

== Pool 1 ==
European Rugby Champions Cup Pool 1
Pos	Team	Pld	W	D	L	PF	PA	PD	TF	TA	TB	LB	Pts	Qualification
1	(Ireland) Leinster	1	1	0	0	48	23	+25	7	2	1	0	5	Champions Cup round of 16.
2	(France) Pau	1	1	0	0	41	17	+24	5	2	1	0	5	Champions Cup round of 16.
3	(Scotland) Glasgow Warriors	1	1	0	0	47	27	+20	7	4	1	0	5	Champions Cup round of 16.
4	(England) Sale Sharks	1	0	0	1	27	47	−20	4	7	0	0	0	Champions Cup or Challenge Cup round of 16 based on table points amongst non-top-three teams.
5	(England) Leicester Tigers	1	0	0	1	17	41	−24	2	5	0	0	0	Champions Cup or Challenge Cup round of 16 based on table points amongst non-top-three teams.
6	(France) Clermont	1	0	0	1	23	48	−25	2	7	0	0	0	Champions Cup or Challenge Cup round of 16 based on table points amongst non-top-three teams.

Updated to match(es) played on 18 October 2026. Source: EPCR
Rules for classification: Tiebreakers for teams tied on points: 1) Number of matches won; 2) Difference between points for and against; 3) Total number of points for; 4) Aggregate number of points scored in matches between tied teams; 5) Number of matches won excluding the first match, then the second and so on until the tie is settled.

=== Round 1 ===
17 October 2026
13:00

Sale Sharks (England)	27–47	(Scotland) Glasgow Warriors (1 BP)
Try: Curry 3' c Reed (2) 9' m, 67' m Ma'asi-White 58' c Con: Ford (2/4) 4', 59'; Pen: Ford (1/2) 28'; Cards: Warr (yellow card) 16'; Roebuck (yellow card) 17'	Report	Try: Penalty try 15'; Steyn 21' c Dobie 31' c Craig 47' m Darge 65' c Smith 72' c T. Tuipulotu 76' c Con: Horne (4/5) 22', 32', 65', 73'; Lancaster (1/1) 77'

CorpAcq Stadium, Manchester
Attendance: 4,582
Referee: Craig Evans (Wales)

17 October 2026
16:15

Clermont (France)	23–48	(Ireland) Leinster (1 BP)
Try: Jurand 33' c Belaubre 65' c Con: Plummer (2/2) 34', 65'); Pen: Plummer (3/3) 14', 16', 40'; Cards: Zahouany (yellow card) 56'	Report	Try: Furlong 10' c Sheehan (2) 28' m, 61' c Penalty try 58'; Prendergast 42' c Conan 66' c O'Brien 77' c Con: Prendergast (4/6) 11', 43', 62', 66'; Pen: Prendergast (1/1) 36'; Cards: McCarthy (yellow card) 80'

Stade Marcel-Michelin, Clermont
Attendance: 17,521
Referee: Matthew Carley (England)

18 October 2026
14:00

(1 BP) Pau (France)	41–17	(England) Leicester Tigers
Try: Marta (2) 25' c, 45' c Zabala 31' c Grandidier-Nkanang 72' c Brau-Boirie 77' c Con: Desperes (5/5) 26', 32', 46', 73', 78'; Pen: Desperes (2/3) 4', 58'	Report	Try: Chessum 9' c van der Flier 55' c Con: Searle (2/2) 10', 56'; Pen: Searle (1/1) 18'

Stade du Hameau, Pau
Attendance: 14,288
Referee: Eoghan Cross (Ireland)

=== Round 2 ===
11 December 2026
20:00

Glasgow Warriors (Scotland)	v	(France) Pau

Scotstoun Stadium, Glasgow

12 December 2026
15:15

Leicester Tigers (England)	v	(France) Clermont

Mattioli Woods Welford Road, Leicester

12 December 2026
17:30

Leinster (Ireland)	v	(England) Sale Sharks

Laya Arena, Dublin

=== Round 3 ===
8 January 2027
20:00

Glasgow Warriors (Scotland)	v	(England) Leicester Tigers

Scotstoun Stadium, Glasgow

9 January 2027
17:30

Leinster (Ireland)	v	(France) Pau

Laya Arena, Dublin

10 January 2027
17:30

Sale Sharks (England)	v	(France) Clermont

CorpAcq Stadium, Manchester

=== Round 4 ===
16 January 2027
14:00

Pau (France)	v	(England) Sale Sharks

Stade du Hameau, Pau

16 January 2027
21:00

Clermont (France)	v	(Scotland) Glasgow Warriors

Stade Marcel-Michelin, Clermont

16 January 2027
20:00

Leicester Tigers (England)	v	(Ireland) Leinster

Mattioli Woods Welford Road, Leicester

== Pool 2 ==
European Rugby Champions Cup Pool 2
Pos	Team	Pld	W	D	L	PF	PA	PD	TF	TA	TB	LB	Pts	Qualification
1	(France) La Rochelle	1	1	0	0	31	14	+17	5	2	1	0	5	Champions Cup round of 16.
2	(Ireland) Connacht	1	1	0	0	45	36	+9	7	6	0	0	4	Champions Cup round of 16.
3	(France) Toulouse	1	1	0	0	43	40	+3	7	6	0	0	4	Champions Cup round of 16.
4	(England) Exeter Chiefs	1	0	0	1	40	43	−3	6	7	0	1	1	Champions Cup or Challenge Cup round of 16 based on table points amongst non-top-three teams.
5	(England) Saracens	1	0	0	1	36	45	−9	6	7	0	0	0	Champions Cup or Challenge Cup round of 16 based on table points amongst non-top-three teams.
6	(South Africa) Lions	1	0	0	1	14	31	−17	2	5	0	0	0	Champions Cup or Challenge Cup round of 16 based on table points amongst non-top-three teams.

Updated to match(es) played on 18 October 2026. Source: EPCR
Rules for classification: Tiebreakers for teams tied on points: 1) Number of matches won; 2) Difference between points for and against; 3) Total number of points for; 4) Aggregate number of points scored in matches between tied teams; 5) Number of matches won excluding the first match, then the second and so on until the tie is settled.

=== Round 1 ===
17 October 2026
17:30

Connacht (Ireland)	45–36	(England) Saracens
Try: Prendergast (2) 18' c, 47' c Forde 24' m Hurley-Langton 30' m Frawley (2) 52' c, 64' c Blade 61' m Con: Gilbert (5/7) 19', 31', 48', 53', 65'; Cards: Hurley-Langton (yellow card) 41'; Prendergast (yellow card) 78'	Report	Try: Va'enuku (2) 6' c, 58' c Caluori 12' m Tompkins 42' c Segun 50' m Daly 80' m Con: Farrell (3/6) 7', 43', 58'

Dexcom Stadium, Galway
Attendance: 10,019
Referee: Pierre Brousset (France)

17 October 2026
18:30

(1 BP) La Rochelle (France)	31–14	(South Africa) Lions
Try: Ofa 17' c Jégou 30' c Niniashvili 39' m Latu 61' m Niusalelekitoga 76' c Con: Hastoy (3/5) 18', 31', 77'; Cards: Bourgarit (yellow card) 32'	Report	Try: van Wyk 4' c Brandon 34' c Con: C. Smith (2/2) 5', 35'; Cards: Mahashe (yellow card) 28'

Stade Marcel-Deflandre, La Rochelle
Attendance: 18,000
Referee: Sam Grove-White (Scotland)

18 October 2026
16:15

Toulouse (France)	43–40	(England) Exeter Chiefs (1 BP)
Try: Capuozzo 6' m Penalty try 8'; Brennan 24' c Thomas 33' m Remue (2) 53' c, 68' m Ntamack 55' c Con: Ntamack (3/6) 25', 54', 56'; Cards: Neti (red card) 15'; Thomas (yellow card) 35'	Report	Try: Wimbush (3) 2'c, 18' c, 62' c Yeandle 37' m Varney 40' c Butt 48' c Con: Slade (5/6) 3', 18', 41', 49', 63'; Cards: Harris (yellow card) 8'; Hammersley (yellow card) 66'

Stade Ernest-Wallon, Toulouse
Attendance: 32,684
Referee: Hollie Davidson (Scotland)

=== Round 2 ===
12 December 2026
15:00

Lions (South Africa)	v	(France) Toulouse

Ellis Park Stadium, Johannesburg

12 December 2026
17:30

Saracens (England)	v	(France) La Rochelle

StoneX Stadium, London

13 December 2026
13:00

Exeter Chiefs (England)	v	(Ireland) Connacht

Sandy Park, Exeter

=== Round 3 ===
9 January 2027
15:15

Exeter Chiefs (England)	v	(France) La Rochelle

Sandy Park, Exeter

9 January 2027
20:00

Connacht (Ireland)	v	(France) Toulouse

Dexcom Stadium, Galway

9 January 2027
15:15

Saracens (England)	v	(South Africa) Lions

StoneX Stadium, London

=== Round 4 ===
16 January 2027
15:00

Lions (South Africa)	v	(England) Exeter Chiefs

Ellis Park Stadium, Johannesburg

16 January 2027
18:30

La Rochelle (France)	v	(Ireland) Connacht

Stade Marcel-Deflandre, La Rochelle

17 January 2027
16:15

Toulouse (France)	v	(England) Saracens

Stade Ernest-Wallon, Toulouse

== Pool 3 ==
European Rugby Champions Cup Pool 3
Pos	Team	Pld	W	D	L	PF	PA	PD	TF	TA	TB	LB	Pts	Qualification
1	(South Africa) Stormers	1	1	0	0	49	12	+37	7	2	1	0	5	Champions Cup round of 16.
2	(Ireland) Munster	1	1	0	0	33	25	+8	5	3	0	0	4	Champions Cup round of 16.
3	(England) Gloucester	1	0	1	0	36	36	0	5	5	0	0	2	Champions Cup round of 16.
4	(France) Bordeaux Bègles	1	0	1	0	36	36	0	5	5	0	0	2	Champions Cup or Challenge Cup round of 16 based on table points amongst non-top-three teams.
5	(France) Racing 92	1	0	0	1	25	33	−8	3	5	0	0	0	Champions Cup or Challenge Cup round of 16 based on table points amongst non-top-three teams.
6	(England) Bristol Bears	1	0	0	1	12	49	−37	2	7	0	0	0	Champions Cup or Challenge Cup round of 16 based on table points amongst non-top-three teams.

Updated to match(es) played on 17 October 2026. Source: EPCR
Rules for classification: Tiebreakers for teams tied on points: 1) Number of matches won; 2) Difference between points for and against; 3) Total number of points for; 4) Aggregate number of points scored in matches between tied teams; 5) Number of matches won excluding the first match, then the second and so on until the tie is settled.

=== Round 1 ===
16 October 2026
20:00

Gloucester (England)	36–36	(France) Bordeaux Bègles
Try: Clark 9’ c Llewellyn 13’ c Barton 33’ c Trenholm (2) 56' m, 60' c Con: Barton (4/5) 9', 14', 34', 61'; Pen: Barton (1/1) 40'	Report	Try: Page-Relo 4' c Falatea 20' c Uberti 47' m Bielle-Biarrey (2) 51' c, 63' c Con: Lucu (4/5) 5', 21', 52', 64'; Pen: Lucu (1/1) 26'

Kingsholm Stadium, Gloucester
Attendance: 12,102
Referee: Gianluca Gnecchi (Italy)

17 October 2026
16:15

(1 BP) Stormers (South Africa)	49–12	(England) Bristol Bears
Try: Senatla 7' c Zas (2) 16' c, 78' c Roche (2) 29' c, 53' c Gelant 72' c Venter 74' c Con: Feinberg-Mngomezulu (7/7) 8', 17', 30', 54', 73', 75', 79'; Cards: Kotze (red card) 34'; Zas (yellow card) 48'	Report	Try: Owen 23' c Moody 51' m Con: Worsley (1/2) 24'

DHL Stadium, Cape Town
Attendance: 16,570
Referee: Kevin Bralley (France)

17 October 2026
20:00

Munster (Ireland)	33–25	(France) Racing 92
Try: Gleeson 7' c McCarthy 13' c Beirne 43' c Wycherley 60' c Casey 79' m Con: O'Shea (3/3) 8', 14', 44'; Hanrahan (1/2) 61'	Report	Try: Hulleu 48' m Machenaud 53' c Manu 67' c Con: Gibert (2/3) 54', 68'; Pen: Gibert (2/2) 3', 26'; Cards: Roche (yellow card) 70'

SuperValu Páirc Uí Chaoimh, Cork
Attendance: 24,906
Referee: Karl Dickson (England)

=== Round 2 ===
12 December 2026
20:00

Bristol Bears (England)	v	(Ireland) Munster

Ashton Gate, Bristol

13 December 2026
16:15

Bordeaux Bègles (France)	v	(South Africa) Stormers

Stade Chaban-Delmas, Bordeaux

13 December 2026
18:30

Racing 92 (France)	v	(England) Gloucester

Plenitude Arena, Nanterre

=== Round 3 ===
9 January 2027
13:00

Gloucester (England)	v	(South Africa) Stormers

Kingsholm Stadium, Gloucester

10 January 2027
14:00

Racing 92 (France)	v	(England) Bristol Bears

TBA

10 January 2027
16:15

Bordeaux Bègles (France)	v	(Ireland) Munster

Stade Chaban-Delmas, Bordeaux

=== Round 4 ===
16 January 2027
17:15

Stormers (South Africa)	v	(France) Racing 92

DHL Stadium, Cape Town

16 January 2027
15:15

Bristol Bears (England)	v	(France) Bordeaux Bègles

Ashton Gate, Bristol

16 January 2027
17:30

Munster (Ireland)	v	(England) Gloucester

Thomond Park, Limerick

== Pool 4 ==
European Rugby Champions Cup Pool 4
Pos	Team	Pld	W	D	L	PF	PA	PD	TF	TA	TB	LB	Pts	Qualification
1	(South Africa) Bulls	1	1	0	0	56	20	+36	8	2	1	0	5	Champions Cup round of 16.
2	(France) Montpellier	1	1	0	0	32	14	+18	4	2	0	0	4	Champions Cup round of 16.
3	(England) Northampton Saints	1	1	0	0	28	12	+16	4	2	0	0	4	Champions Cup round of 16.
4	(Wales) Cardiff	1	0	0	1	12	28	−16	2	4	0	0	0	Champions Cup or Challenge Cup round of 16 based on table points amongst non-top-three teams.
5	(England) Bath	1	0	0	1	14	32	−18	2	4	0	0	0	Champions Cup or Challenge Cup round of 16 based on table points amongst non-top-three teams.
6	(France) Stade Français Paris	1	0	0	1	20	56	−36	2	8	0	0	0	Champions Cup or Challenge Cup round of 16 based on table points amongst non-top-three teams.

Updated to match(es) played on 18 October 2026. Source: EPCR
Rules for classification: Tiebreakers for teams tied on points: 1) Number of matches won; 2) Difference between points for and against; 3) Total number of points for; 4) Aggregate number of points scored in matches between tied teams; 5) Number of matches won excluding the first match, then the second and so on until the tie is settled.

=== Round 1 ===
17 October 2026
14:00

(1 BP) Bulls (South Africa)	56–20	(France) Stade Français Paris
Try: Jooste (3) 1' c, 74' c, 76' c Wiese 17' c Hanekom 37' c van Staden 47' c Rudolph 63' c Wessels 68' c Con: Pollard (8/8) 2', 17', 37', 48', 63', 69', 75', 77'	Report	Try: Botha 44' c Mailulu 56' c Con: Foursans-Bourdette (2/2) 45', 57'; Pen: West (1/1) 10'; Foursans-Bourdette (1/1) 33'

Loftus Versfeld, Pretoria
Attendance: 8,942
Referee: Christophe Ridley (England)

17 October 2026
20:00

Bath Rugby (England)	14–32	(France) Montpellier
Try: Lawrence 19' c Green 25' c Con: Russell (2/2) 20', 26'	Report	Try: Hogg 12' c Taofifénua (2) 48' m, 63' c Bécognée 75' c Con: Hastngs (3/4) 13', 63', 76'; Pen: Hastngs (2/2) 35', 56'

The Rec, Bath
Attendance: 14,501
Referee: Andrea Piardi (Italy)

18 October 2026
17:30

Northampton Saints (England)	28–12	(Wales) Cardiff
Try: Pater 12' c Thame 21' c Hendy 64' c Dingwall 79' c Con: Belleau (3/3) 13', 22', 80'; Pater (1/1) 65'; Cards: Belleau (yellow card) 61'	Report	Try: Millard 47' c Grady 61' m Con: J. Evans (1/2) 48'

Franklin's Gardens, Northampton
Attendance: 13,983
Referee: Jeremy Rozier (France)

=== Round 2 ===
11 December 2026
20:00

Stade Français Paris (France)	v	(England) Northampton Saints

Stade Jean-Bouin, Paris

12 December 2026
16:15

Montpellier (France)	v	(South Africa) Bulls

Septeo Stadium, Montpellier

12 December 2026
20:00

Cardiff (Wales)	v	(England) Bath

Cardiff Arms Park, Cardiff

=== Round 3 ===
9 January 2027
17:00

Bulls (South Africa)	v	(England) Bath

Loftus Versfeld, Pretoria

9 January 2027
18:30

Montpellier (France)	v	(England) Northampton Saints

Septeo Stadium, Montpellier

9 January 2027
21:00

Stade Français Paris (France)	v	(Wales) Cardiff

Stade Jean-Bouin, Paris

=== Round 4 ===
15 January 2027
20:00

Northampton Saints (England)	v	(South Africa) Bulls

Franklin's Gardens, Northampton

15 January 2027
20:00

Cardiff (Wales)	v	(France) Montpellier

Cardiff Arms Park, Cardiff

17 January 2027
17:30

Bath (England)	v	(France) Stade Français Paris

The Rec, Bath
