= Goodrick-Clarke =

Goodrick-Clarke is an English surname. Notable people with the surname include:

- Nicholas Goodrick-Clarke (1953–2012), British scholar of esotericism
- Will Goodrick-Clarke (born 1996), English rugby union player
