= George Timmins =

George Timmins may refer to:

- George Timmins (footballer) (1864–?), English footballer
- George Timmins (rugby union) (born 2005), English rugby union player
