= Harry Palmer (rugby union) =

English rugby union player (born 2005)

- Born: 28 October 2005 (age 21)
- Height: 1.96 m (6 ft 5 in)
- Weight: 100 kg (15 st 10 lb; 220 lb)

Rugby union career
- Position: Lock
- Current team: Leicester Tigers
Senior career
Years	Team	Apps	(Points)
2025-	Leicester Tigers		
2025	→ Sagamihara DynaBoars (loan)		

Harry Palmer (born 28 October 2005) is an English professional rugby union footballer who plays for Leicester Tigers. His preferred position is Lock.

== Career ==
From Hinckley, Palmer is a product of the Leicester Tigers rugby academy and also played on loan in National One at Leicester Lions. Palmer signed a professional contract with the club in December 2025. He had a loan spell with Japanese side Mitsubishi Sagamihara DynaBoars in Japan Rugby League One in 2025.

Palmer started every match for Leicester in their 2025–26 PREM Rugby Cup winning run. In the semi-final on 8 March 2026, he was a try scorer as Leicester defeated Bath 46-21. He subsequently featured in the starting-XV for the Prem Cup final as the club won 66-14 against Exeter Chiefs, the following weekend.
