= Finn Theobald-Thomas =

English rugby union player

- Full name: Finn Theobald-Thomas
- Born: 26 April 2003 (age 23) Wolverhampton, England
- Height: 183 cm (6 ft 0 in)
- Weight: 109 kg (240 lb; 17 st 2 lb)
- School: The Stourport High School and Sixth Form Centre

Rugby union career
- Position: Hooker
Youth career
- 20??–2017: Wolverhampton RUFC
- 2017–2021: Worcester Warriors
Senior career
Years	Team	Apps	(Points)
2021–2022	Worcester Warriors	3	(5)
2021	→ Stourbridge (loan)	6	(0)
2021	→ Coventry (loan)	1	(0)
2022	→ Nottingham (loan)	1	(0)
2022–2023	Gloucester	1	(0)
2023	→ Chinnor (loan)	5	(10)
2023–2026	Leicester Tigers	31	(20)
- Correct as of 31 March 2026
International career
Years	Team	Apps	(Points)
2022–2023	England U20s	12	(5)
- Correct as of 10 January 2024

Finn Theobald-Thomas (born 26 April 2003) is an English former rugby union player. A hooker, he made the majority of his domestic appearances for Leicester Tigers and represented England at youth level.

== Club career ==
Theobald-Thomas began his career at his hometown club Wolverhampton RUFC. He also played in the Worcester Warriors academy and was part of their Under-18s side that finished third in the Premiership Under-18s Academy League in 2019/20. He joined the Worcester Senior Academy in 2021. He made his full senior debut coming off the bench in a 68-13 Premiership Rugby Cup match against Bristol Bears. While at Worcester he spent time on dual registration at Stourbridge, Coventry and Nottingham.

With the collapse of Worcester Warriors he joined Gloucester playing only one match in the Premiership Rugby Cup against Exeter Chiefs. He joined Chinnor on loan in January 2023, featuring 5 times, making his debut in a 48–12 win over Rosslyn Park scoring a try.

In 2023 he joined Leicester Tigers, debuting in the Premiership Rugby Cup against Bedford Blues. He was a member of the Leicester side that beat Exeter to win the 2026 Prem Rugby Cup.

In September 2026 is was announced that Theobald-Thomas was being forced to retire from professional rugby with Tiger's Head Coach Geoff Parling stating he was "...gutted with this news... from both a team point of view and for him personally to have such a promising rugby journey cut short."

== International career ==
Theobald-Thomas scored a try for England U20 against Wales during the 2022 Six Nations Under 20s Championship. He started every round of the 2023 Six Nations Under 20s Championship. Later that year he was a member of the squad that finished fourth at the 2023 World Rugby U20 Championship.

== Honours ==
Leicester Tigers

- Premiership Rugby Cup: 2025–2026
