= James Linegar =

English rugby union player

- School: Kingswood School
- University: University of Bath

Rugby union career
- Position: Fly-half
- Current team: Bath
Senior career
Years	Team	Apps	(Points)
2025–	Bath		
International career
Years	Team	Apps	(Points)
2024-	England U18		

James Linegar is an English professional rugby union footballer who plays as a fly-half for Bath Rugby and the England national under-18 rugby union team.

== Early life ==
Linegar started playing rugby union at his father's club in Bradford on Avon, and later played for Chippenham RFC as well as for Kingswood School, where he studied for a BTEC in Sport and an A-Level in Psychology his rugby coaches included renowned former player Matt Banahan. He later studied at the University of Bath where he played British Universities and Colleges Sport (BUCS) Super Rugby.

== Club career ==
In February 2024, he was part of the Bath U18 team which won the Premiership Rugby U18 Academy League title. In May 2024, Bath Rugby announced that Linegar had signed his first professional contract.

He started at fly-half for Bath in the Premiership Rugby Cup against Exeter Chiefs in September 2025 for his professional debut.

== International career ==
Playing for the England national under-18 rugby union team in March 2024 at the U18 Six Nations Festival in Parma, he scored a last-minute conversion in a 36-35 victory over Wales U18. He toured South Africa with England U18 for the 2024 U18 International Series. He featured for England U19 in March 2025. He was called-up for England national under-20 rugby union team in September 2025.
