= Dan John =

Welsh rugby union player

- Full name: Dan John
- Born: 4 October 2001 (age 25) Cardiff, Wales
- Height: 178 cm (5 ft 10 in)
- Weight: 86 kg (190 lb; 13 st 8 lb)
- School: Millfield School
- University: Exeter University
- Notable relative(s): Paul John (father); Dennis John (grandfather)

Rugby union career
- Position: Utility Back
- Current team: Exeter Chiefs (dual-registered with Cornish Pirates)
Youth career
- 2007-2013: Llantwit Fardre RFC
- 2017-2018: Hong Kong Football Club
Senior career
Years	Team	Apps	(Points)
2020-2026	Exeter Chiefs	13	(0)
2021-2023	→ Exeter University (loan)	25	(40)
2023-	→ Cornish Pirates (loan)	3	(5)
- Correct as of 23 March 2024
International career
Years	Team	Apps	(Points)
2018	Wales under-18		
2019	Wales under-19	1	(0)
2020-2021	Wales under-20	6	(0)
- Correct as of 23 March 2024

Dan John (born 4 October 2001) is a Welsh rugby union player who plays as a Utility Back for Exeter Chiefs in the English Premiership, as well as being dual-registered with the Cornish Pirates in the RFU Championship.

== Club career ==
He began playing rugby at Llantwit Fadre RFC, at age 12 he gave up rugby to focus on football, playing for Cardiff City FC Academy. As well as representing Wales in Cross Country, Track and Field and Combined Events at age grade level.

He began playing rugby again when his father moved to Hong Kong to coach the Hong Kong Sevens team he joined Hong Kong Football Club playing rugby of their under-19 side. Moving back to England in 2018 he joined Millfield School being part of the "2020 Golden Year".

In 2020 he joined Exeter Chiefs, making his debut on March 20, 2020, he came off the bench in a 47–31 win over Leicester Tigers. He made his first start for Exeter the following week, starting at outside centre against Gloucester. While at Exeter Chiefs he played for Exeter University in BUCS Super Rugby, winning the league in 2021-22 and 2022–23. In 2023 he joined the Cornish Pirates on dual registration.

== International career ==
He played for Wales under-18, as well as featuring for Wales under-19 in a 31–12 win over Scotland under-19. He played twice for Wales under-20 in the 2020 Six Nations Under 20s Championship and then featured again four times in the following championship in 2021.
