= Jimmy Roots =

New Zealand rugby union player

- Born: 31 January 2000 (age 26) New Zealand
- Height: 188 cm (6 ft 2 in)
- Weight: 126 kg (278 lb; 19 st 12 lb)
- Notable relative: Ethan Roots (brother)

Rugby union career
- Position: Prop
Senior career
Years	Team	Apps	(Points)
2019 – 2022	North Harbour	14	(0)
2022–2024	Ealing Trailfinders	16	(0)
2024–	Exeter Chiefs	2	(5)
- Correct as of 28 July 2024

Jimmy Roots (born 31 January 2000 in New Zealand) is a New Zealand rugby union player who played for North Harbour in the National Provincial Championship until 2022 when he joined Ealing Trailfinders who play in the RFU Championship. His playing position is prop.

On 7 June 2024, Roots moves to the Premiership Rugby competition with Exeter Chiefs for the 2024-25 season, where he will link up with his brother, England forward Ethan Roots.
