= Louie Johnson =

English rugby union player

- Born: 13 June 2003 (age 23) Carlisle, England
- Height: 185 cm (6 ft 1 in)
- Weight: 93 kg (14 st 9 lb)
- School: Sedbergh School

Rugby union career
- Position(s): Fly-half, Full-back
Senior career
Years	Team	Apps	(Points)
2022–2024	Newcastle Falcons	16	(72)
2024–2026	Saracens	13	(76)
2026–	Ealing Trailfinders	0	(0)
- Correct as of 25 June 2024
International career
Years	Team	Apps	(Points)
2022–2023	England U20s	13	(20)
- Correct as of 14 July 2023

Louie Johnson (born 13 June 2003) is an English professional rugby union player who plays as a fly-half or full-back for RFU Championship club Ealing Trailfinders. At international level he represented the England U20 team.

== Early life ==
Born in Carlisle, Johnson played age-group rugby for Penrith RUFC from the age of six, prior to joining up with the Newcastle academy aged 13. He attended Queen Elizabeth Grammar School, Penrith and captained Sedbergh School, and also ran nationally in the 800 metres athletics at age-group level.

== Career ==
Johnson was promoted to the Newcastle Falcons senior academy ahead of the 2021-22 season. He made his Newcastle debut in the Premiership Rugby Cup against Northampton Saints in March 2022.

In October 2022, he scored a last minute conversion to seal a 32-31 win over Leicester Tigers in the Premiership Rugby Cup.

In April 2024, having made 16 league appearances for Newcastle, Johnson was announced to be joining Saracens on a long-term contract. On 1 June 2026, it was confirmed that Johnson would sign for Ealing Trailfinders in the RFU Championship from the 2026-27 season.

== International career ==
In February 2022 Johnson made his debut for England U20 against Scotland in the opening round of the 2022 U-20 Six Nations. He played for England at the 2023 World Rugby U20 Championship, starting the semi-final defeat against France. In the game Johnson showed "sharp thinking" to intercept the ball which led to England’s second try. He also featured in their last fixture of the tournament which saw them lose to hosts South Africa to finish fourth.

== Style of play ==
Johnson's position is listed as full-back or fly-half.
