= Campbell Ridl =

English rugby union player (born 2005)

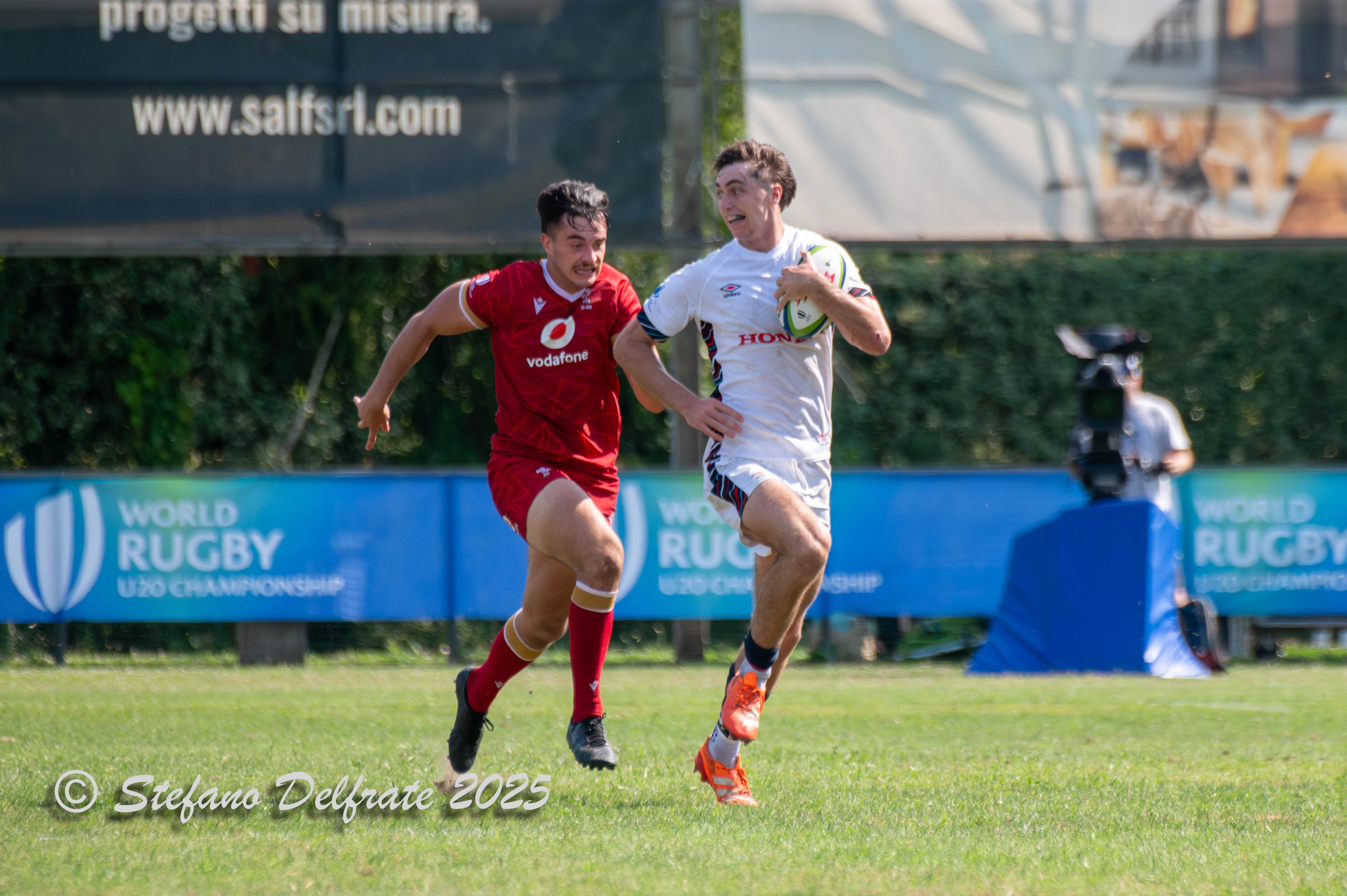
- Full name: Campbell Ridl
- Born: 2 February 2005 (age 21) Wandsworth, London, United Kingdom
- Height: 196 cm (6 ft 5 in)
- Weight: 93 kg (205 lb; 14 st 9 lb)
- School: Michaelhouse (South Africa)
- University: University of Exeter

Rugby union career
- Position: Wing / Centre
- Current team: Exeter Chiefs
Youth career
- 2023: Sharks U18
Amateur team(s)
Years	Team	Apps	(Points)
2024	Exeter University RFC	10	(10)
Senior career
Years	Team	Apps	(Points)
2025–	Exeter Chiefs	24	(85)
- Correct as of 18 June 2026
International career
Years	Team	Apps	(Points)
2024	England U19	2	(10)
2025	England U20	7	(15)
- Correct as of 14 February 2026

Campbell Ridl (born 2 February 2005) is an English rugby union player who plays as a wing or centre for Exeter Chiefs and has represented England at U19 and U20 level.

== Early life and education ==
Ridl was born in Wandsworth, London and raised in South Africa, where he attended Michaelhouse Boarding School in KwaZulu-Natal. While at Michaelhouse, he played for the school’s First Team and was selected for the Craven Week tournament in 2023, representing KwaZulu-Natal at South Africa’s premier schools rugby competition.

In 2023, Ridl, along with Wandile Mlaba and Luke Davidson, was part of the Michaelhouse School 1st team that won the International U18s Sevens Tournament in the UK.

After completing his schooling in South Africa, Ridl moved to the United Kingdom and joined the Exeter Chiefs pathway while studying in Exeter, continuing his rugby development within the club and university environment. Playing British Universities and Colleges Sport (BUCS) rugby for Exeter, Ridl won multiple man of the match awards.

== Rugby career ==
=== Club career ===
Ridl joined the Exeter Chiefs setup while at university, progressing from the university side into the club’s senior structures. Ridl made his first senior appearances for Exeter Chiefs during the 2025–26 Premiership Rugby season, attracting independent media attention for his early impact at club level, including coverage highlighting his try-scoring debut and rapid progression within the senior squad. His performances included a solo try on his second league start for the club against Leicester Tigers in December 2025.

Ridl served a two-match ban in January 2026 after receiving a red card for a dangerous tackle on Harry Arundel in the Prem against Bath.

The following month, he scored a hat-trick of tries for Exeter against Bristol Bears in the Premiership Rugby Cup in a 46-35 away victory. On 14 February 2026, he scored another hat-trick of tries for Exeter against Gloucester Rugby in the Premiership Rugby Cup at Sandy Park, following up his treble the previous week.

In his debut season for Exeter Chiefs, Ridl enjoyed a highly prolific breakout season, ultimately running in 17 tries across 24 senior appearances in all competitions. He played a key role in the club's late-season surge, starting on the wing in the Premiership semi-final victory over reigning champions Bath. On 20 June 2026, Ridl started at left wing in the Gallagher Premiership Grand Final against Northampton Saints at Twickenham, scoring an individual sprint try in the first half of Exeter's 26–17 defeat. In September 2026, he was ruled-out of a significant section of the 2026-27 season with a knee injury suffered in pre-season.

=== International career ===
==== England U19 ====
Ridl represented the England U19 side in 2024, featuring in international fixtures as part of his progression through England Rugby’s youth pathway.

==== England U20 ====
Ridl made his debut for the England U20 in the 2025 Six Nations Under 20s Championship and scored a try, attracting independent media attention for his performances at age-grade level and emergence as a promising young player with Exeter Chiefs and England U20s.

Ridl also featured for England in the 2025 World Rugby U20 Championship and was noted for his contributions in age-grade international competition, including involvement in key matches against Wales during the tournament.

== Personal life ==
The son of South African parents, his parents met whilst in London, where he was born. He studied marketing at the University of Exeter. His younger brother William is also a rugby player, having signed with the Sharks.

== Honours and Awards ==
- Exeter Chiefs Young Player of the Year: 2025–26
- Exeter Chiefs Individual Try of the Season: 2025–26 (vs. Harlequins)
