= Tom O'Flaherty (rugby union) =

English rugby union player

- Full name: Tom O'Flaherty
- Born: 21 July 1994 (age 32) Lambeth, England
- Height: 1.80 m (5 ft 11 in)
- School: Dulwich College
- University: Cardiff University

Rugby union career
- Position: Wing
- Current team: Sale Sharks
Senior career
Years	Team	Apps	(Points)
2012–2013	Blackheath	17	(10)
2013–2014	Cardiff RFC	4	(20)
2014–2015	Bridgend RFC	25	(90)
2015–2016	Montpellier		
2016–2017	Ospreys	11	(25)
2017–2022	Exeter Chiefs	97	(175)
2022–	Sale Sharks	85	(155)
- Correct as of 31 May 2026

Tom O'Flaherty (born 21 July 1994) is an English rugby union player who plays for Premiership Rugby Sale Sharks. His playing position is a Wing.

== Career ==
O’Flaherty started playing rugby at Old Alleynians in a highly successful minis side. He then went on to play for Dulwich College, winning the Daily Mail Trophy, and then briefly Blackheath. Studying at Cardiff University, he played for Cardiff RFC towards the end of 2013 and scored four tries in four appearances. A move to Bridgend Ravens followed where he scored 18 tries in 25 appearances in the 2014–15 season. That campaign culminated in the Ravens lifting the SWALEC Cup with O’Flaherty scoring the match-winning try against Pontypridd RFC in the final at the Principality Stadium, Cardiff. He spent a season in France, with French Top 14 side Montpellier but returned to Wales after a season where he had joint registration with Bridgend and the Ospreys. After debuting for the Ospreys in 2016 against Harlequins F.C. in the Anglo-Welsh Cup he played against Cardiff Blues and Glasgow and also came off the bench versus Bristol Rugby. He was also part of the Ospreys squad for that season's Singha Premiership 7s competition.

On 26 January 2017, O'Flaherty signed for English club Exeter Chiefs in the Aviva Premiership prior to the 2017–18 season.

O'Flaherty played on 30 March 2018 as Exeter beat Bath Rugby in the final of the Anglo-Welsh Cup.

On 29 March 2022, it was announced that O'Flaherty would leave Exeter to join Premiership rivals Sale Sharks on a long-term deal ahead of the 2022-23 season.

== Honours ==
SWALEC Cup

Winner 2014-15

Anglo-Welsh Cup

Winner 2017-18

Heineken Champions Cup

Winner 2019-20
