= Austin Emens =

English rugby union player

- Born: 9 October 2002 (age 24)
- Height: 1.83 m (6 ft 0 in)
- Weight: 84 kg (185 lb)
- School: Brighton College
- University: University of Bath

Rugby union career
- Position: Winger
- Current team: Bath
Senior career
Years	Team	Apps	(Points)
2024–	Bath	17	(27)
National sevens team
Years	Team		Comps
2023-	Great Britain		

Austin Emens (born 9 October 2002) is an English rugby union player who plays for Bath Rugby and the Great Britain national rugby sevens team.

== Early life ==
Between 2016 and 2021 he attended Brighton College and played club rugby for Horsham Rugby Club. He then studied for a business degree at the University of Bath whilst playing BUCS Super Rugby and joined the Bath Rugby academy.

== Club career ==
He signed a senior academy contract with Bath Rugby in April 2024. He was named in the starting XV for his Rugby Premiership debut away against Gloucester Rugby on 12 October 2024. On 26 April 2025, he scored the try for Bath in the Rugby Premiership against Newcastle Falcons that set a new club record for the amount of tries scored in the regular league season. He scored two in the game as they won 55-19 to guarantee their position at the top of the league prior to the play-offs. In May 2025, he had his contract extended by Bath.

== International career ==
He made his debut for the Great Britain national rugby sevens team at the Dubai Sevens in December 2023.
