= Sam Worsley =

English rugby union player (born 2003)

- Born: 13 October 2003 (age 23) Bristol, England
- Height: 1.78 m (5 ft 10 in)
- Weight: 82 kg (181 lb; 12 st 13 lb)

Rugby union career
- Position: Fly-half
Senior career
Years	Team	Apps	(Points)
2022–	Bristol Bears	30	(119)
- Correct as of 18 January 2026
International career
Years	Team	Apps	(Points)
2022	England U18	1	(12)
2023	England U20	1	(2)
- Correct as of 19 March 2023

Sam Worsley (born 13 October 2003) is an English professional rugby union footballer who plays as a fly-half for Bristol Bears. He is the son of former England rugby international Mike Worsley.

== Club career ==
A product of the Bristol Bears academy and educated at Clifton College, he was part of the Bristol Cubs side that won the U18s Premiership Academy title in 2022, and went unbeaten throughout the U18s competition on their way to becoming National champions. That year, he featured for the first-team in a pre-season match against CA Brive in August 2022. He made his European Champions Cup debut against Bordeaux in December 2023.

He made his Premiership Rugby debut for Bristol against Exeter Chiefs on 12 October 2024. He became the starting fly-half for Bristol for a time during the 2024-25 season after an injury to AJ MacGinty. He signed a new contract with the club in December 2024.

== International career ==
In March 2022, Worsley represented England U18. He made his only appearance for the England U20 side in a defeat against Ireland during the last round of the 2023 Six Nations Under 20s Championship.
