= George Newman =

George Newman may refer to:

- George Newman (MP) (c. 1562–1627), Member of Parliament for Canterbury and Dover
- George Newman (cricketer) (1904–1982), English cricketer
- George Newman (physician) (1870–1948), English public health physician
- George Newman, a fictional character played by “Weird Al” Yankovic in the film UHF
- George Gough Newman (1862–1929) South Australian educator
