= Tomas Gwilliam =

Welsh rugby union player

- Born: 19 November 2002 (age 23) Newport, Wales
- Height: 185 cm (6 ft 1 in)
- Weight: 107 kg (16 st 12 lb)
- School: Colstons School

Rugby union career
- Position: Hooker
- Current team: Bristol Bears
Senior career
Years	Team	Apps	(Points)
2023–	Bristol Bears	22	(30)

Tomas Gwilliam (born 19 November 2002) is a Welsh rugby union player who plays at hooker for PREM Rugby side Bristol Bears.

== Club career ==
Gwilliam made his Bears debut in the Premiership Rugby Cup tie against Exeter Chiefs, followed by his PREM Rugby debut in the win against Northampton Saints.

On 27 May 2026, Gwilliam signed a new contract with Bristol.
