= Josh Carrington =

Welsh rugby union player (born 2002)

- Born: Joshua Michael Carrington; 27 April 2002 (age 24) Swansea, Wales
- Height: 1.88 m (6 ft 2 in)
- Weight: 89 kg (196 lb)
- University: Cardiff Metropolitan University

Rugby union career
- Position(s): Full-back, Winger
- Current team: Bristol Bears
Youth career
- Morriston RFC
Senior career
Years	Team	Apps	(Points)
2025–	Bristol	8	(10)
International career
Years	Team	Apps	(Points)
- Wales U18

Josh Carrington (born 25 April 2002) is a Welsh professional rugby union footballer who plays predominantly as a full-back for Premiership Rugby club Bristol Bears.

== Professional career. ==
Carrington played as a youngster for Morriston RFC and in the Ospreys Rugby academy before later playing for Swansea RFC. Carrington played for Ospreys A in a friendly against a Scarlets development team in November 2021. He represented Wales at under-18 level.

Carrington played British Universities and Colleges Sport (BUCs) Super Rugby for Cardiff Met, predominantly as a full-back but also playing on the wing.

In January 2025, Carrington played for the Welsh Academies U23 in friendly against Wales U20, scoring a try.

He featured in an exhibition match for Bristol Bears in January 2025, prior to signing terms with the club ahead of the 2025-26 season. He had a try-scoring debut for Bristol against Sale Sharks on 13 September 2025 in the Premiership Rugby Cup. He also scored on his league debut in the club's 42-24 victory over Leicester Tigers on 28 September 2025 in the Prem.

== Personal life ==
His father Mike played rugby union for Cardiff and Neath, as well as professional rugby league for St Helens R.F.C. He competed in youth athletics, and is a fluent Welsh speaker.
