= Zack Wimbush =

Welsh rugby union footballer

Zack Luke Jacquel Wimbush
- Born: 24 October 2003 (age 23) Hong Kong
- Height: 198 cm (6 ft 6 in)
- Weight: 117 kg (258 lb; 18 st 6 lb)
- School: Exeter College
- University: University of Exeter

Rugby union career
- Position: Centre
- Current team: Exeter Chiefs
Senior career
| Years | Team | Apps | (Points) |
| 2022– | Exeter Chiefs | 31 | (40) |
- Correct as of 9 March 2026

Zack Wimbush (born 24 October 2003) is an English professional rugby union player who plays as a centre for Exeter Chiefs.

== Early life ==
Born in Hong Kong, Wimbush started playing rugby there at the age of eight years-old at the Valley Fort club. He attended HKIS from age 4 and left (on a sports scholarship) at 13 years-old he moved to Mount Kelly School in Tavistock, whom he also played for at county and club level Wimbush then attended Exeter College. In 2023, he was attending Exeter University.

== Career ==
Wimbush was invited to England Under-18 training camps a year young, without playing a game. An injury the following year prevented him from becoming an age-grade international.

Wimbush made his debut for Exeter Chiefs in November 2022, in the Premiership Rugby Cup against Bath Rugby. He scored his first try for Exeter in the European Rugby Champions Cup against Glasgow Warriors in January 2024. Wimbush also scored during their quarter-final elimination against Toulouse. He scored his first try for Exeter in the Premiership against Newcastle Falcons in March 2024.

On 8 March 2026, Wimbush was a try scorer as Exeter defeated Northampton Saints 31–14 to earn a place in the final of the 2025–26 PREM Rugby Cup.

== International status ==
Wimbush was born in Hong Kong and qualifies for England on his father's side and Australia on his mother's side.
