= Ethan Caine =

English rugby union player

- Born: 20 September 2001 (age 25)
- Height: 180 cm (5 ft 11 in)
- Weight: 104 kg (16 st 5 lb)
- School: St. Edwards College, Liverpool and Kirkham Grammar School

Rugby union career
- Position: Hooker
- Current team: Sale Sharks
Senior career
| Years | Team | Apps | (Points) |
| 2021– | Sale Sharks | | |

Ethan Caine (born 20 September 2001) is an English professional rugby union player who plays as a hooker for Sale Sharks.

== Career ==
Caine attended St Edwards College, Liverpool as an 11 year old and played rugby at the schhol through to 16 when he joined the 6th Form at Kirkham Grammar School in Kirkham, Lancashire, prior to joining the academy at Sale Sharks. He made his first team debut for Sale in the Premiership Rugby Cup during the 2021-22 season. In February 2023, he extended his contract with Sale.

In September 2023, he scored a try for Sale in their opening game of the Premiership Rugby Cup against Bedford Blues. In October 2023, he scored a try in the Rugby Premiership for Sale on their opening match of the league season against Northampton Saints in a 20-15 victory. That season, he also played for Sale in the European Rugby Champions Cup.
