= Archie van der Flier =

English Rugby player

- Born: Archie van der Flier; 25 April 2002 (age 24)
- Height: 1.92 m (6 ft 3 1/2 in)
- Weight: 118 kg (18.6 st; 260 lb)
- School: Canford School
- University: University of Nottingham
- Notable relative: Josh van der Flier (cousin)

Rugby union career
- Position: Loosehead Prop
- Current team: Leicester Tigers
Senior career
Years	Team	Apps	(Points)
2023–	Leicester Tigers	31	(30)
2023–2025	→ Nottingham (loan)	34	(20)
- Correct as of 1 November 2026
International career
Years	Team	Apps	(Points)
2026	England A	1	(0)
- Correct as of 5 December 2025

Archie van der Flier (born 25 April 2002) is an English rugby union player who plays for Leicester Tigers in the Premiership Rugby. His main position is a loosehead prop. He is Irish-qualified through his father.

== Career ==
Archie joined Leicester Tigers, as part of the Senior Academy, after impressing for Nottingham in the RFU Championship.

On 7 October 2023, he made his competitive debut for Leicester against Bedford Blues in the Premiership Rugby Cup. Ahead of the 2025–26 season, he was rewarded with a senior squad contract with Leicester.

On 6 February 2026, van der Flier was part of England A, debuted from off the bench where they beat Ireland XV 52–14 at Thomond Park in Limerick.

On 9 October 2026, van der Flier made his first start in Premiership Rugby against Gloucester Rugby at Welford Road, being named as the Man of the match by TNT Sports.
