= Ethan Roots =

England international rugby union player

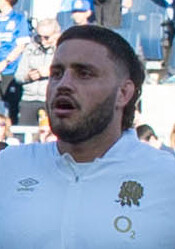
- Born: 10 November 1997 (age 29) Auckland, New Zealand
- Height: 1.88 m (6 ft 2 in)
- Weight: 110 kg (243 lb; 17 st 5 lb)
- School: Rosmini College
- Notable relative: Jimmy Roots (brother)

Rugby union career
- Position(s): Flanker, Number 8
- Current team: Exeter Chiefs
Senior career
Years	Team	Apps	(Points)
2019–2020	North Harbour	20	(0)
2020	Crusaders	1	(0)
2021–2023	Ospreys	38	(5)
2023–	Exeter Chiefs	24	(25)
- Correct as of 19 January 2024
International career
Years	Team	Apps	(Points)
2020	Māori All Blacks	1	(0)
2024–	England	3	(0)
- Correct as of 19 January 2024

Ethan Roots (born 10 November 1997) is a professional rugby union player who plays as a flanker for Premiership Rugby club Exeter Chiefs. Born in New Zealand, he represents England at international level after qualifying on ancestry grounds.

== Early life ==
Roots was born in Auckland to a Māori mother (Ngāti Kahungunu) and an English father from Reading. He attended Rosmini College and after leaving school was a construction worker.

Roots began practising Brazilian jiu-jitsu at the age of 15 to improve his fitness. He went on to win eight national titles and a gold and three silver medals at the Pan-Pacific Championships, and trialled for the world championships. He also trained in mixed martial arts, including Muay Thai, and participated in cage fighting before the age of 18.

== Club career ==
After playing for local club East Coast Bays, Roots represented North Harbour in the 2019 Mitre 10 Cup. His performances in this competition led to him joining Crusaders although he made only one appearance during the 2020 Super Rugby season against Highlanders. In December 2020 Roots represented Māori All Blacks against Moana Pasifika at Waikato Stadium.

In March 2021 Roots moved to Europe signing for Ospreys. After two years in Wales, Exeter Chiefs announced that Roots would be joining them from the 2023–24 season.

== International career ==
Roots received his first call up to the senior England squad on 17 January 2024 for the 2024 Six Nations Championship for the match against Italy. Roots was given the player of the match award for his debut performance.
