= George Timmins (rugby union) =

English rugby union player (born 2005)

- Born: 19 April 2005 (age 21) Kettering, England
- Height: 1.89 m (6 ft 2 in)
- Weight: 100 kg (15 st 10 lb; 220 lb)
- School: Millfield

Rugby union career
- Position: Flanker
- Current team: Bath
Senior career
| Years | Team | Apps | (Points) |
| 2025– | Bath | 8 | (15) |
| 2025–2026 | → Nottingham (loan) | 16 | (20) |
- Correct as of 3 August 2026
International career
| Years | Team | Apps | (Points) |
| 2023 | England U18s | 3 | (0) |
| 2025 | England U20s | 6 | (5) |
- Correct as of 29 June 2025

George Timmins (born 19 April 2005) is an English professional rugby union footballer who plays as a flanker for Premiership Rugby club Bath Rugby.

== Club career ==
Timmins was educated at Millfield in Somerset and began playing rugby for Market Harborough RUFC. In 2023, he signed a senior academy contract with Bath Rugby.

He made his senior debut on loan for Nottingham Rugby in the RFU Championship against Cambridge in April 2025. In May 2025, he had his contract extended by Bath. He made his competitive league debut for Bath as a replacement on 31 May 2025 against Saracens in the Premiership. His performances the following season included soctomt two tries in a 60-19 win over Sale Sharks in the Rugby Premiership Cup in February 2026.

== International career ==
Timmins played for England U18 at the 2023 Six Nations Festival. Later that year he was one of a handful of youngsters given the opportunity to train with the senior England team by coach Steve Borthwick during the 2023 Rugby World Cup.

Timmins scored a try for England U20 in a victory over Italy during the 2025 Six Nations Under 20s Championship and also started in the last round which saw England lose against Wales at Cardiff Arms Park to miss out on a grand slam and ultimately finish runners-up. In June 2025, Timmins was a member of the England squad that finished sixth at the 2025 World Rugby U20 Championship.
