= Seb Driscoll =

Welsh rugby player (born 2003)

- Born: 10 September 2003 (age 23)
- Height: 186 cm (6 ft 1 in)
- Weight: 100 kg (220 lb)
- School: Whitgift School
- University: University of Exeter

Rugby union career
- Position: Flanker
- Current team: Harlequins
Senior career
Years	Team	Apps	(Points)
2025–	Harlequins		
International career
Years	Team	Apps	(Points)
2023	Wales U20		

Seb Driscoll (born 10 September 2003) is a Welsh professional rugby union footballer who plays for Prem Rugby club Harlequins. His preferred position is flanker.

== Early life ==
Driscoll was educated at Whitgift School, and played junior rugby at Old Reigatians RFC before later attending Exeter University.

== Club career ==
A flanker, Having joined the Harlequins rugby academy, Driscoll made his debut for Harlequins in the Premiership Rugby Cup in the autumn of the 2025-26 season. He went on to make his Rugby Premiership in December 2025 as a replacement against Leicester Tigers. The following month, he renewed his contract with the club.

Driscoll began the 2026-27 season with two tries in a win in the Premiership Rugby Cup against Leicester in September 2026. The following month, he was also a try-scorer for Harlequins in the Rugby PREM against Saracens.

== International career ==
Driscoll represented the Wales national under-20 rugby union team and was part of the squad at the 2023 World Rugby U20 Championship.
