= Arthur Green (rugby union) =

English rugby union player (born 2004)

- Born: 4 March 2004 (age 22) London, England
- Height: 1.82 m (6 ft 0 in)
- Weight: 105 kg (16 st 7 lb; 231 lb)
- School: Sherborne School
- University: Durham University
- Notable relative: Will Green (father)

Rugby union career
- Position: Number 8
- Current team: Bath Rugby
Senior career
Years	Team	Apps	(Points)
2023–	Bath	29	(75)
- Correct as of 1 May 2026
International career
Years	Team	Apps	(Points)
2022	England U18	4	(5)
2024	England U20	2	(5)
- Correct as of 19 July 2024

Arthur Green (born 4 March 2004) is an English professional rugby union player who plays as a number 8 for Premiership Rugby club Bath Rugby.

== Early life ==
He attended Sherborne School and played for Frome RFC as a youngster. He joined the senior Academy at Bath Rugby in 2022. He also played first-XV rugby for Durham University.

== Club career ==
Green made his senior Bath Rugby debut in the Premiership Rugby Cup in September 2023 against London Scottish. He made his league debut in a Premiership Rugby fixture for Bath on 31 December 2023, against Leicester Tigers.

He joined Doncaster Knights on loan ahead of the 2024-25 season. During that campaign he also represented Bath in the Premiership Rugby Cup and scored a try in their quarter-final victory over Harlequins. Green started in the final as Bath defeated Exeter Chiefs to win their first domestic trophy since 1996. In May 2025, he had his contract extended by Bath. He continued with Bath in the 2025-26 season and his performances included a last minute try to secure a 33-26 win for Bath at home against Exeter Chiefs on 3 January 2026.

== International career ==
Green made a try scoring debut for England U18 during the 2021-22 season. He was included in the England U20 squad for the 2024 World Rugby U20 Championship and scored a try in the final as England defeated France at Cape Town Stadium to become junior world champions.

== Personal life ==
His father Will Green was a professional rugby player who earned caps for England whilst playing as a prop forward for Wasps RFC.

== Honours ==
Bath Rugby

- Premiership Rugby Cup: 2024–2025

England U20

- World Rugby U20 Championship
  - (gold) Champion (1): 2024
