= Will Goodrick-Clarke =

English rugby union player

- Born: Will Goodrick-Clarke; 29 December 1995 (age 30) Cheltenham, England
- Height: 1.85 m (6 ft 1 in)
- Weight: 124 kg (19 st 7 lb)
- School: Cheltenham College
- University: Oxford Brookes University

Rugby union career
- Position: Loosehead Prop
- Current team: Exeter Chiefs
Amateur team(s)
Years	Team	Apps	(Points)
- Stow-on-the-Wold RFC
Senior career
Years	Team	Apps	(Points)
2016–2019	Richmond	0	(0)
2019–2023	London Irish	69	(5)
2023–2024	Ealing Trailfinders	18	(20)
2024–	Exeter Chiefs	0	(0)
International career
Years	Team	Apps	(Points)
2022	England		
- Correct as of 10 September 2024

Will Goodrick-Clarke (born 29 December 1996) is an English rugby union player who plays for Exeter Chiefs in the Gallagher Premiership.

Goodrick-Clarke was part of the Gloucester academy before signed on to play for Richmond from the 2016-17 RFU Championship season. He was named in The Rugby Paper's 2018/19 Championship Dream Team, as voted for by the coaches from the 12 clubs in the league.

On 15 May 2019, Goodrick-Clarke was signed by London Irish during the 2019-20 Gallagher Premiership season. During his time in the green exile jersey, Goodrick-Clarke made over 50 club appearances, becoming a key figure amongst the ranks of the aspiring side. Spotted by former England coach Eddie Jones, he was involved in multiple international training camps before a non-capped appearance came in 2022 against the Barbarians at Twickenham Stadium.

After Irish entered administration due to financial reasons and suspended from the Premiership, Goodrick-Clarke was signed by Championship side Ealing Trailfinders for the 2023–24 season.

On 14 June 2024, Goodrick-Clarke returned to the Premiership competition with Exeter Chiefs from the 2024–25 season.
