= Joe Owen (rugby union) =

English rugby union player (born 2001)

- Born: 16 August 2001 (age 25)
- Height: 2.00 m (6 ft 7 in)
- Weight: 114 kg (17 st 13 lb; 251 lb)
- School: The King's School

Rugby union career
- Position: Lock
- Current team: Bristol Bears
Senior career
| Years | Team | Apps | (Points) |
| 2021–2022 | Clifton | 11 | (25) |
| 2022– | Bristol Bears | 47 | (20) |
- Correct as of 2 January 2026
International career
| Years | Team | Apps | (Points) |
| 2025– | England A | 1 | (0) |
- Correct as of 15 November 2025

Joe Owen (born 16 August 2001) is an English professional rugby union footballer who plays as a lock for Premiership Rugby side Bristol Bears.

== Career ==
Owen played for Clifton RFC in the 2021-22 season prior to joining Bristol Bears in 2022. He played for the club in the Premiership Rugby Cup, with performances including a 40-yard solo try against Doncaster Knights in September 2023. After also making his league debut during the 2023-24 season, Owen signed a new professional contract with the club in March 2024. He made his first Premiership Rugby start on 29 November 2024, in a 48-28 win over Harlequins.

In November 2025, Owen represented England A in a victory against Spain.

== Personal life ==
Owen attended The King's School, Gloucester.
