= Louie Gulley =

English rugby union player

- Born: 8 May 2005 (age 21) Crediton, England
- Height: 1.84 m (6 ft 0 in)
- Weight: 105 kg (231 lb; 16 st 7 lb)
- University: University of Exeter

Rugby union career
- Position: Hooker
Senior career
Years	Team	Apps	(Points)
2025–	Exeter Chiefs	7	(10)
- Correct as of 11 October 2026
International career
Years	Team	Apps	(Points)
2024–2025	England U20	8	(5)
- Correct as of 19 July 2025

Louie Gulley (born 8 May 2005) is an English professional rugby union footballer who plays for Exeter Chiefs. His preferred position is hooker. He made his professional debut for Exeter during the 2025-26 season.

== Early life ==
From Crediton, Devon, Gulley began playing rugby union at a young age and featured for Crediton Rugby Club. He joined the Exeter Chiefs academy at the age of 15 years-old and later studied sport science at the University of Exeter, and played for Exeter University Rugby Football Club.

== Club career ==
Gulley signed a professional contract with Exeter Chiefs in April 2025. He made a competitive debut for the Exeter Chiefs in the 2025-26 season against Sale Sharks in the Premiership Rugby Cup. Gulley made a try-scoring first appearance as captain of the first-XV in November 2025, when he was named captain in the Premiership Rugby Cup in a win against Bristol Bears. In May 2026, he signed a new long-term contract with the club.

== International career ==
Gulley was a member of the England U20 squad that won the 2024 World Rugby U20 Championship. He was part of the side that were runners up in the 2025 Six Nations Under 20s Championship and scored a try during the penultimate round against Italy. Later that year he was a member of the squad that finished sixth at the 2025 World Rugby U20 Championship.

== Personal life ==
His brother Tom Gulley also plays rugby union, featuring for Exeter University at loosehead prop.
