= Charlie Griffin (rugby union) =

English rugby union player (born 2005)

- Born: 6 December 2005 (age 20)
- School: Harrow School
- University: University of Bath

Rugby union career
- Position: Winger
- Current team: Bath Rugby
Senior career
Years	Team	Apps	(Points)
2024-	Bath		
International career
Years	Team	Apps	(Points)
2023-2024	England U18		
2025	England U20		

Charlie Griffin (born 6 December 2005) is an English rugby union player who plays as a winger for Premiership Rugby side Bath Rugby.

== Early life ==
Griffin played in the academy of London Irish from a young age, being named the player of the tournament at the Lyon Rugby U12 International Festival in 2018. He attended Harrow School. He later studied at the University of Bath where he played British Universities and Colleges Sport (BUCS) Super Rugby.

== Club career ==
Griffin played for the Saracens Academy prior to joining Bath Rugby. He signed a professional contract with Bath ahead of the 2024-25 season having won the Premiership Academy U18 title with Bath in 2024.

Griffin made his professional debut for Bath on 2 November 2024 in the Premiership Rugby Cup in a 73-0 win over Ampthill RUFC. His performances for Bath have included a try in a 60-19 win over Sale Sharks in the Rugby Premiership Cup in February 2026.

Griffin made a try-scoring PREM Rugby debut, starting on the left wing, against Northampton Saints at Franklin's Gardens on 10 October 2026.

== International career ==
He played for England U18 in 2023 and 2024 before going on to feature at under-20 level. In November 2024, he was called-up to the England A national rugby union team.
