= Anthony Belleau =

France international rugby union player

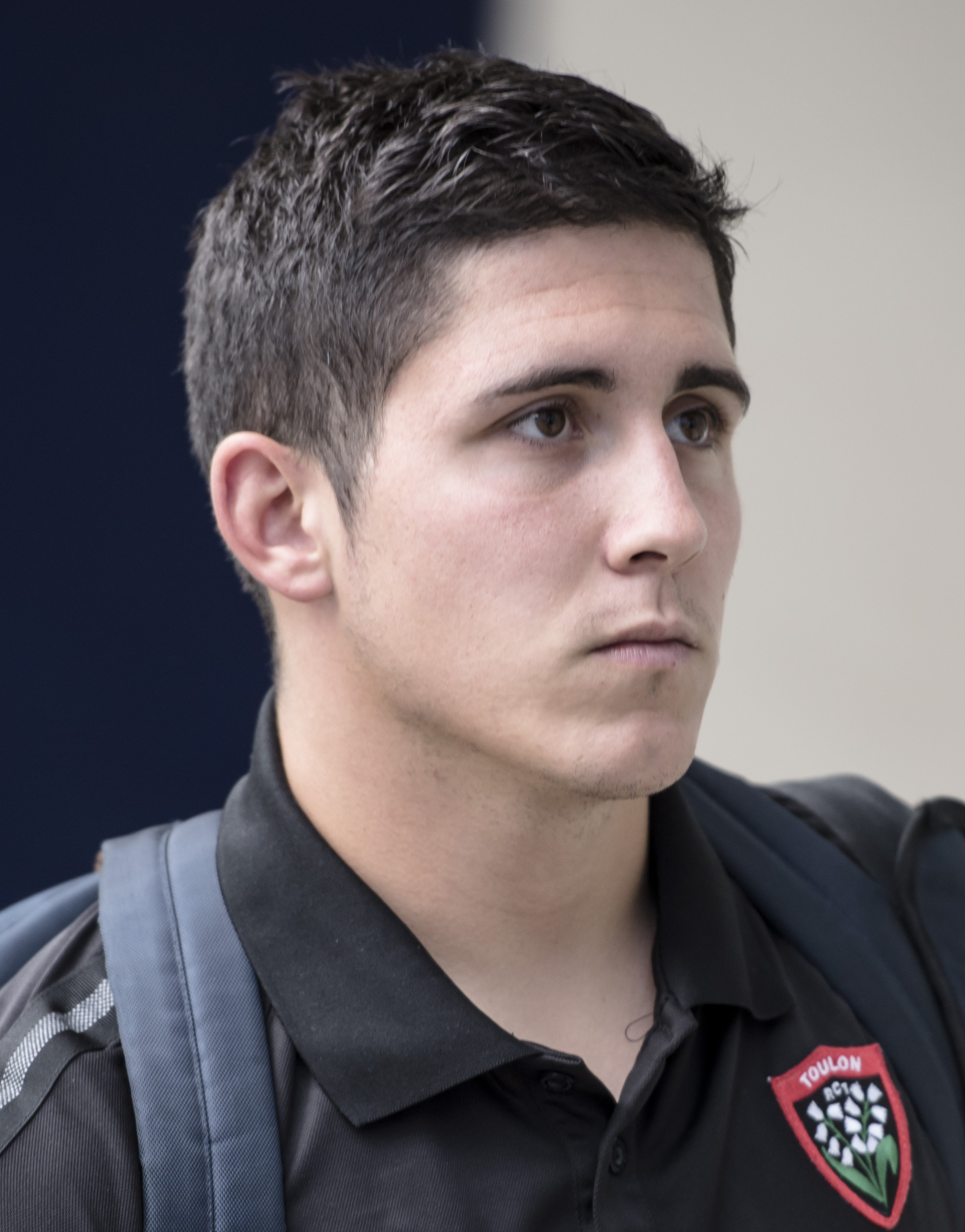
- Belleau playing for Toulon in 2016
- Born: Anthony Belleau; 8 April 1996 (age 30) Monflanquin, France
- Height: 1.77 m (5 ft 9 1/2 in)
- Weight: 85 kg (13 st 5 lb)

Rugby union career
- Position: Fly-half
- Current team: Northampton Saints
Amateur team(s)
Years	Team	Apps	(Points)
2002–2010	Entente des 4 Cantons		
2010–2014	Agen		
2014–2016	Toulon		
Senior career
Years	Team	Apps	(Points)
2016–2022	Toulon	111	(698)
2022–2025	Clermont	80	(504)
2025–	Northampton Saints	11	(91)
- Correct as of 18 January 2026
International career
Years	Team	Apps	(Points)
2017–2025	France	12	(24)
- Correct as of 10 March 2019

Anthony Belleau (born 8 April 1996 in Monflanquin) is a French professional rugby union player who plays as a fly-half for PREM Rugby club Northampton Saints.

== Club career ==
=== Northampton Saints ===
In May 2025, he signed for Prem Rugby side Northampton Saints ahead of the 2025–26 season. In October 2025, he scored his first two tries for the club in a 32–26 victory against Leicester Tigers.

== International tries ==
#	Date	Venue	Cap	Opponent	Result (France-...)	Competition
1.	18 November 2017	Stade de France, Saint-Denis, France	2	South Africa	17–18	Test Match

== Honours ==
Northampton

- Premiership Rugby: 2025–26
