= Will Butt =

English rugby union player

- Born: 15 January 2000 (age 26) Winchester, Hampshire, England
- Height: 1.90 m (6 ft 3 in)
- Weight: 105 kg (16 st 7 lb; 231 lb)
- School: Canford School
- University: University of Bath

Rugby union career
- Position: Centre
Youth career
- 2014–2021: Bath
Senior career
Years	Team	Apps	(Points)
2021–2026	Bath	75	(60)
2021	→ Coventry (loan)	6	(20)
2026–	Exeter Chiefs	0	(0)
- Correct as of 24 February 2026
International career
Years	Team	Apps	(Points)
2025–	England A	1	(0)
- Correct as of 23 February 2025

Will Butt (born 15 January 2000) is an English professional rugby union player who plays as a centre for Premiership Rugby club Exeter Chiefs.

== Early life ==
He grew up in Dorset. He played junior rugby for Wimborne RFC in Wimborne, Dorset, in 2012. He studied at Canford School in the county. Butt started playing age group rugby union for Bath Rugby at the age of fourteen years-old and captained Bath at under-18 level during the 2017-18 season. He attended the University of Bath where he played first-XV rugby in BUCS Super Rugby.

== Club career ==
He plays at centre. In April 2021, Butt joined Coventry of the RFU Championship on loan from the Bath Rugby academy. During that loan spell he made six appearances, and equalled the Coventry club record for tries in a single match when he scored four tries in a league game against the Jersey Reds, in May 2021.

He graduated from the Bath Rugby academy to the senior squad in the summer of 2021, ahead of the 2021-22 season. He made his Premiership Rugby debut in December 2021 away against Northampton Saints at Franklin's Gardens. On 11 November 2022, Butt scored a last minute try to secure for Bath a 19-18 home league win over Leicester Tigers at The Rec.

In February 2025, he made his fiftieth appearance for Bath against Ampthill in the Premiership Rugby Cup. The following month, on 16 March 2025, he played in the 2024–25 Premiership Rugby Cup final as Bath beat Exeter Chiefs 48-14 to lift the trophy. He also started Bath's 2024–25 EPCR Challenge Cup final win that season.

On 29 January 2026, Butt confirmed a summer move to West County rivals Exeter Chiefs on a three-year contract from the 2026-27 season.

== International career ==
In February 2025, Butt started for England A in a victory against Ireland Wolfhounds at Ashton Gate.
