= James Pater =

English rugby player (born 2007)

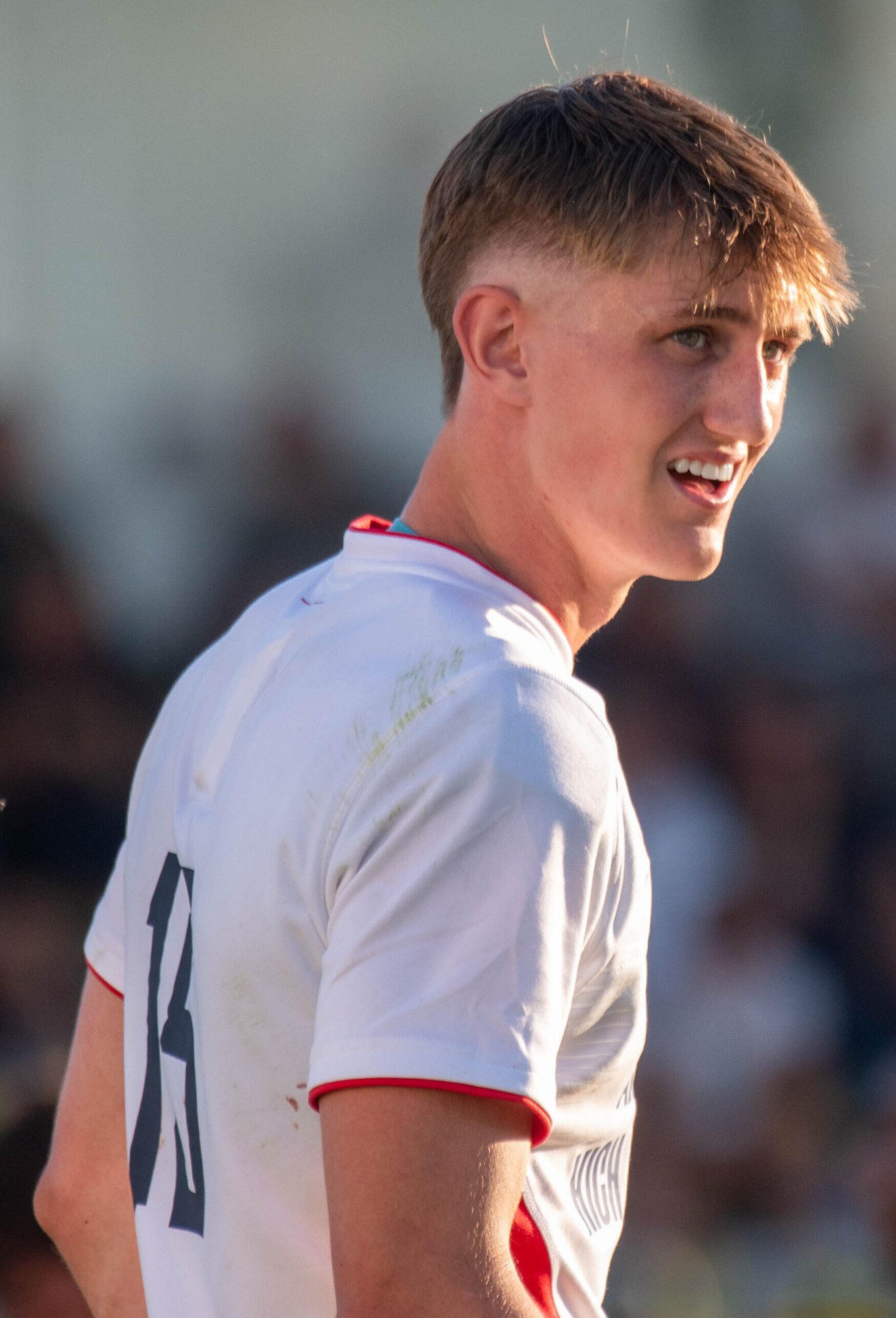
- Pater with England U20s in 2026
- Born: 2007 February 7th
- Height: 184 cm (6 ft 0 in)
- School: The Leys School

Rugby union career
- Position: Fullback
- Current team: Northampton Saints
Senior career
Years	Team	Apps	(Points)
2025–	Northampton Saints	17	(69)
International career
Years	Team	Apps	(Points)
2025	England U18		
2026–	England U20	5	(7)
- Correct as of 15 March 2026

James Pater (born 2 July 2007) is an English rugby union footballer who plays for PREM Rugby club Northampton Saints. His preferred position is full-back.

== Club career ==
An alumnus of The Leys School, Pater signed his first professional contract with Northampton Saints in June 2025, having first joined the club's academy system in 2023 having been spotted playing at the Rosslyn Park Sevens Tournament.

Pater came off the bench to make his senior debut in PREM Rugby away at Gloucester on the final day of the 2024–25 Premiership season. The following season, Pater had a try-scoring home debut for Northampton in the Premiership Rugby Cup in November 2025, in a 26–17 win over Harlequins. He went on to feature on the bench for Northampton in the Rugby Champions Cup against United Rugby Championship club Scarlets in January 2026. Pater was announced for his first start at fly-half for Northampton in the Premiership Rugby Cup against Leicester Tigers on 31 January 2026, and was a try-scorer in a 40–22 victory, kicking five conversions.

Pater opened the 2026-27 season on 25 September 2026 with a hat-trick of tries, including two in the opening quarter-of-an hour, in a 59-26 win against Newcastle Red Bulls.

== International career ==
Pater played age-group rugby union for England at under-18 and under-19 level. His performances included a breakaway try from full-back for England U18 against France U18 in April 2025.

In January 2026, he was called-up to the England under-20s team and that summer appeared at the 2026 World Rugby Junior World Championship.

In November 2026, he was included in the England A squad to play against an Argentina XV in Bath.

== Personal life ==
Pater is nicknamed the 'Slim Reaper' due to his lean build.
