= Exeter Chiefs =

English rugby union club, based in Exeter

Exeter Rugby
- Full name: Exeter Rugby Club
- Union: Devon RFU
- Nickname: Chiefs
- Founded: 1871; 155 years ago
- Location: Exeter, Devon, England
- Ground: Sandy Park (Capacity: 15,600)
- Chairman: Tony Rowe
- CEO: Tony Rowe
- Director of Rugby: Rob Baxter
- Captain: Dafydd Jenkins
- Most appearances: Ben Moon (300)
- Top scorer: Gareth Steenson (2,531)
- Most tries: Sam Simmonds (85)
- League: PREM Rugby
- 2025–26: 3rd of 10 (runners-up in play-offs)
1st kit	2nd kit	3rd kit

Official website
- exeterchiefs.co.uk

Exeter Chiefs (officially Exeter Rugby Club) is an English professional rugby union club based in Exeter, Devon. They play in the Gallagher PREM, England's top division of rugby.

The club was founded in 1871 and since 2006 has played its home matches at Sandy Park, a purpose-built facility on the outskirts of the city near IKEA. They have been known by the name Chiefs since 1999. The club was promoted to the Premiership for the first time in 2010. Since promotion, the Chiefs have become one of the leading clubs in the Premiership, winning the championship title twice, in 2016–17 and 2019–20 respectively, and reaching a further five finals. In October 2020, the Chiefs won the Champions Cup, the top prize in European club rugby union, defeating French club Racing 92 in the final.

Exeter are the only club to win the top four tiers of English rugby, winning the Premiership in 2017 and 2020, RFU Championship in 2010, National League 1 in 1997 and National League 2 South in 1996. They have won the Anglo-Welsh Cup/Premiership Rugby Cup three times, most recently in 2022–23, and the European Rugby Champions Cup once, in 2020.

The current director of rugby is Rob Baxter, who was appointed in March 2009.

== History ==
=== Early years ===
Exeter Rugby Club was founded in 1871. The club played its first match in 1873 against St. Luke's College, and in 1890 won the Devon Cup. In 1905, the club hosted the first match played by New Zealand on English soil and also in the Northern Hemisphere, at the County Ground. The visitors fixture was against a Devon County XV. It was from that game that New Zealand became known as the "All Blacks". When league rugby started, Exeter were initially placed in the Devon leagues.

=== Early league and professional era ===
In 1993 and 1995, Exeter reached the quarter finals of the Pilkington Cup before being knocked out by top division opponents Leicester Tigers and London Wasps respectively.

In 1997, Exeter were promoted into the Premiership Two for the first time from National League 1. They regularly finished in the top half of the table. In 2005, Exeter finished second in the league, missing out on promotion by four points behind Bristol Rugby. The next season, they moved from the County Ground to Sandy Park due to a need for modern facilities that included corporate hospitality. In 2008 they again finished in second place and again missed out on promotion by finishing behind Northampton Saints. The same situation happened the next season when Exeter finished behind Leeds Carnegie.

=== Premiership ===
In 2009, National Division One was reorganised into the RFU Championship with playoffs. During the regular league season, Exeter finished second behind Bristol. In the playoffs, they defeated Bedford Blues and Nottingham, before facing Bristol in the two legged final. Exeter won 9–6 in the first leg at Sandy Park and then won 29–10 at Bristol's Memorial Stadium in the second leg to win promotion to the Premiership for the first time. In their first season in the Premiership, they finished eighth despite a two-point deduction and a £5,000 fine for fielding too many overseas players during their match against Leeds Carnegie at Headingley Stadium. They also made their debut in the European Challenge Cup, making their way to the quarter finals where they lost to Stade Français. In the next season, they finished fifth in the Premiership which permitted them to play in the Heineken Cup for the first time. In their first season in the Heineken Cup, they were drawn against French Clermont Auvergne, Irish Leinster Rugby and Welsh Scarlets in the group stage. They finished the group third with nine points ahead of Scarlets. In 2014, Exeter Chiefs won their first major rugby trophy after they defeated Northampton Saints in the Anglo-Welsh Cup 15–8 at Sandy Park.

=== Recent seasons ===
In the 2015–16 season the Chiefs finished in second place in Premiership Rugby entitling them to a home semi final in the Aviva Premiership which was played against Wasps. They won the match 34-23 thanks to two penalty tries, a try from Ian Whitten and a try from Dave Ewers as well as two penalties and four conversions from Gareth Steenson. This meant the Chiefs qualified to their first Aviva Premiership final on 28 May. They lost 28–20 to champions Saracens despite tries from England international Jack Nowell and club captain Jack Yeandle as well as 2 penalties and 2 conversions from Gareth Steenson. The Chiefs also reached the quarter-final of the European Champions Cup in 2015–16. They were drawn away to Wasps in a tight game which they eventually lost 25–24 at the Ricoh Arena after Wasps' Jimmy Gopperth kicked a last-minute conversion. In 2016–17, the Chiefs won the Premiership for the first time in their history by beating Wasps in the final 23–20. The game finished 20–20 at full time with captain Gareth Steenson slotting a late penalty to take it to extra time. In extra time, Steenson added another penalty to secure the victory.

The Chiefs finished the 2017–18 season eight points clear at the top of the Premiership Rugby table, but ultimately lost to 27–10 to Saracens in the final on 26 May 2018. The Chiefs saw their most success to date during the 2019–20 season, winning an historic double of the European Rugby Champions Cup, in their first appearance in the final, and the Premiership. In light of several controversies regarding their crest, the club unveiled a new logo ahead of the 2022–23 season (see below).

In the 2023–2024 season Exeter finished 7th and reached the quarter finals of the champions cup and topped their rugby cup group and then lost in the semi finals to Gloucester. They won their first game 65–20 against Saracens but lost their final game to Leicester Tigers. In October 2024, the Chiefs sacked their defence coach Omar Mouneimne after having had their worst start to the Premiership, suffering six straight defeats at the start the 2024-25 season. In January 2025, they suffered their 12th defeat in 13 Premiership or Champions Cup and conceded the most points of any game they have played at home since reaching the top flight in 2010, having been defeated 69–17 to Bordeaux Bègles.

In April 2026, the club finalised a deal for an American investor to take control of the club from Tony Rowe subject to a members vote. Although control of the club would be passed to new ownership, it was agreed that Rowe should stay on alongside Director of Rugby, Rob Baxter. In the week after the initial announcement, it was revealed that the group behind the proposed takeover were current AFC Bournemouth owners Black Knight Football Club, including the actor Michael B. Jordan.

== Stadium ==
Exeter play their home games at Sandy Park, which is located on the outskirts of the city. The club moved from their previous home, the County Ground, in 2006 having played there regularly since 1905. In 2002, Exeter Chiefs started looking for a new stadium because they felt the County Ground provided insufficient opportunities for growth. Despite concerns and opposition from traditionalists within the club, the motion to move was passed by 99% of the attendees at Exeter's annual general meeting. Following development of the East Stand in 2021/22, Sandy Park can now accommodate 15,600 spectators, however, there are plans to increase this capacity to 20,600 because of a requirement for later stages of European matches to be played at grounds with a capacity of at least 20,000.

== Logos and kits ==
=== Current kit ===
The kit is supplied by Samurai Rugby Gear. Multinational specialty chemical company Sika is the club's main sponsor for the 2024/25 season, with their logo appearing on the front of the shirt. They also sponsor team captain Dafydd Jenkins. Troy appear on the top left and Watson is on the top right. M.J Baker Foods is on the right sleeve. On the back of the shirt, Centrax is on the top while Sandy Park is on top of the squad number and Bradfords Building Supplies at the bottom. On the shorts, SW Comms (which also appear on the centre and the top left on the front of the shirt) is on the bottom left of the front shorts while on the back shorts, Frobishers Juices is at the top while Otter Brewery is on the bottom left.

=== Logo issue ===
Chiefs logo from when they turned semi-professional in 1999 until 2022. The image of a native American was called "racist" by groups of Chiefs supporters

In 1999, Exeter Rugby Club turned semi-professional and changed their name to Exeter Chiefs, adopting a logo of a man in a headdress. The team had previously been referred to as the Chiefs in the 1930s, and Exeter rugby sides have done so as far back as 1908. In 2016, the club's fans were called upon to change their behaviour over concerns that it could be considered an offensive appropriation of Native American culture.

In July 2020, a group set up by Exeter Chiefs supporters called for the club's "racist use of Native American imagery and branding" to be dropped, comparing the use of the headdresses and chanting the tomahawk chop to blackface. A petition gained more than 550 signatures in a week, with Exeter's Labour MP, Ben Bradshaw, also publicly backing the move. By Wednesday 8 July the petition had grown to 2,000 signatures and the debate about whether a re-brand was needed gained widespread attention. By 29 July the petition had gained 3,700 signatures and the issue was considered by the Exeter Board of Directors, they decided their branding was "highly respectful" but nonetheless retired their mascot Big Chief which "could be regarded as disrespectful". This decision was called "tone deaf" by the petitioners and considered controversial in the wider press.

In October 2021, fellow Premiership club Wasps called on the RFU and Premiership Rugby to rule on the acceptability of Exeter fans wearing "Native American-style headdresses" and discouraged the visiting Exeter fans from wearing them, though they stopped short of a ban. In November 2021 the National Congress of American Indians published an open letter calling for Exeter to drop their logo, the use of headdresses and venue names such as the 'Wigwam Bar', and that the continued use of such things perpetuated "dehumanising stereotypes". In response to this, the club stated that this issue would be addressed in the November AGM, and a decision made by the board of directors in the following weeks.

On 27 January 2022 it was announced that the club would be dropping the Native American branding in July 2022. The club now use imagery depicting the Iron Age tribe, the Dumnonii.

== Season summaries ==
	Premiership				Domestic Cup		European Cup	
Season	Competition	Final Position	Points	Play-Offs	Competition	Performance	Competition	Performance
1987–88	Courage League Division 3	9th	8	N/A	John Player Cup	N/A	No competition	N/A
1988–89	Courage League Division 3	9th	8	N/A	Pilkington Cup	3rd round	No competition	N/A
1989–90	Courage League Division 3	6th	11	N/A	Pilkington Cup	4th round	No competition	N/A
1990–91	Courage League Division 3	4th	16	N/A	Pilkington Cup	3rd round	No competition	N/A
1991–92	Courage League Division 3	4th	18	N/A	Pilkington Cup	2nd round	No competition	N/A
1992–93	Courage League Division 3	3rd	17	N/A	Pilkington Cup	Quarter-final	No competition	N/A
1993–94	Courage League Division 3	6th	19	N/A	Pilkington Cup	2nd round	No competition	N/A
1994–95	Courage League Division 3	10th (R)	7	N/A	Pilkington Cup	Quarter-final	No competition	N/A
1995–96	Courage League Division 4	1st (P)	28	N/A	Pilkington Cup	4th round	No English teams	N/A
1996–97	Courage League Division 3	1st (P)	50	N/A	Pilkington Cup	3rd round	Not qualified	N/A
1997–98	Allied Dunbar Premiership 2	11th	12	N/A	Tetley's Bitter Cup	4th round	Not qualified	N/A
1997–98	Allied Dunbar Premiership 2	11th	12	N/A	C&G Cup	4th in pool	Not qualified	N/A
1998–99	Allied Dunbar Premiership 2	5th	29	N/A	Tetley's Bitter Cup	5th round	No English teams	N/A
1998–99	Allied Dunbar Premiership 2	5th	29	N/A	C&G Cup	2nd round	No English teams	N/A
1999–00	Allied Dunbar Premiership 2	4th	38	N/A	Tetley's Bitter Cup	4th round	Not qualified	N/A
2000–01	National Division 1	3rd	71	N/A	Tetley's Bitter Cup	4th round	Not qualified	N/A
2001–02	National Division 1	3rd	92	N/A	Powergen Cup	6th round	Not qualified	N/A
2001–02	National Division 1	3rd	92	N/A	Powergen Shield	Runners-up	Not qualified	N/A
2002–03	National Division 1	3rd	104	N/A	Powergen Cup	6th round	Not qualified	N/A
2002–03	National Division 1	3rd	104	N/A	Powergen Shield	Runners-up	Not qualified	N/A
2003–04	National Division 1	6th	74	N/A	Powergen Cup	4th round	Not qualified	N/A
2004–05	National Division 1	2nd	101	N/A	Powergen Cup	5th round	Not qualified	N/A
2005–06	National Division 1	6th	71	N/A	EDF Energy Trophy	Semi-final	Not qualified	N/A
2006–07	National Division 1	4th	101	N/A	EDF Energy Trophy	Runners-up	Not qualified	N/A
2007–08	National Division 1	2nd	116	N/A	EDF Energy Trophy	Runners-up	Not qualified	N/A
2008–09	National Division 1	2nd	119	N/A	EDF Energy Trophy	Semi-final	Not qualified	N/A
2009–10	RFU Championship	2nd (P)	88	Champions	British and Irish Cup	4th in pool	Not qualified	N/A
2010–11	Premiership	8th	43	-	LV= Cup	4th in pool	Challenge Cup	2nd in pool
2011–12	Premiership	5th	59	-	LV= Cup	2nd in pool	Challenge Cup	Quarter-final
2012–13	Premiership	6th	59	-	LV= Cup	2nd in pool	Heineken Cup	3rd in pool
2013–14	Premiership	8th	45	-	LV= Cup	Champions	Heineken Cup	3rd in pool
2014–15	Premiership	5th	68	-	LV= Cup	Runners-up	Challenge Cup	Semi-final
2015–16	Premiership	2nd	74	Runners-up	No competition	N/A	Champions Cup	Quarter-final
2016–17	Premiership	2nd	84	Champions	Anglo-Welsh Cup	Runners-up	Champions Cup	3rd in pool
2017–18	Premiership	1st	85	Runners-up	Anglo-Welsh Cup	Champions	Champions Cup	2nd in pool
2018–19	Premiership	1st	86	Runners-up	Premiership Cup	2nd in pool	Champions Cup	2nd in pool
2019–20	Premiership	1st	74	Champions	Premiership Cup	Semi-final	Champions Cup	Champions
2020–21	Premiership	2nd	82	Runners-up	Premiership Cup	no competition	Champions Cup	Quarter-finals
2021–22	Premiership	7th	69	-	Premiership Cup	3rd in pool	Champions Cup	Round of 16
2022–23	Premiership	7th	48	-	Premiership Cup	Champions	Champions Cup	Semi-final
2023–24	Premiership	7th	50	-	Premiership Cup	Semi-final	Champions Cup	Quarter-final
2024–25	Premiership	9th	29	-	Premiership Cup	Runners-up	Champions Cup	6th in pool
2025–26	Premiership	3rd	65	Runners-up	Premiership Cup	Runners-up	Challenge Cup	Semi-Final

Gold background denotes champions
Silver background denotes runners-up
Pink background denotes relegated

== Club honours ==
=== Exeter Chiefs ===
- European Rugby Champions Cup
  - Champions: (1) 2019–20
- Premiership Rugby
  - Champions: (2) 2016–17, 2019–20
  - Runners–Up: (5) 2015–16, 2017–18, 2018–19, 2020-21, 2025-26
- Anglo-Welsh Cup /Premiership Rugby Cup
  - Champions: (3) 2013–14, 2017–18, 2022–23
  - Runners–Up: (4) 2014–15, 2016–17, 2024–25, 2025–26
- RFU Championship
  - Champions: (1) 2009–10
  - Runners–Up: (3) 2004–05, 2007–08, 2008–09
- National League 1
  - Champions: (1) 1996–97
- National League 2 South
  - Champions: (1) 1995–96
- EDF Energy Trophy
  - Runners–Up: (4) 2001–02, 2002–03, 2006–07, 2007–08
- Devon RFU Senior Cup (tier 5)
  - Champions: (16) 1889–90, 1970–71, 1971–72, 1972–73, 1975–76, 1977–78, 1979–80, 1981–82, 1988–89, 1989–90, 1990–91, 1991–92, 1992–93, 1993–94, 1994–95, 1995–96
  - Runners–Up: (5) 1888-89, 1904-05, 1976-77,1980–81, 1985–86
- Devon RFU Junior Cup
  - Champions: (1) 1905–06 (reserve side)
  - Runners–Up: (4) 1903–04 (reserve side)

=== Exeter Braves ===
- Premiership Rugby Shield
  - Champions: (2) 2011–12, 2015–16

== Current squad ==
The Exeter Chiefs squad for the 2026–27 season is:

Exeter Chiefs 2026–27 Premiership Rugby squad
**Props**: (Georgia (country)) **Nika Abuladze**; (South Africa) Ethan Burger; (England) Will Goodrick-Clarke; (England) Josh Iosefa-Scott; (England) Archie McArthur; (England) Ehren Painter; (New Zealand) Jimmy Roots; (Georgia (country)) **Bachuki Tchumbadze**; **Hookers**: (South Africa) **Joseph Dweba**; (Australia) Julian Heaven; (England) Max Norey; (England) Jack Yeandle; **Locks**: (Wales) **Dafydd Jenkins** **(c)**; (England) Obinna Nkwocha; (England) Lewis Pearson; (England) Harry Wilson; (Italy) **Andrea Zambonin**	**Back row**: (England) Richard Capstick; (England) Greg Fisilau; (Australia) **Tom Hooper**; (Wales) **Kane James**; (England) **Ethan Roots**; (Wales) Carwyn Tuipulotu; (Italy) **Ross Vintcent**; **Scrum-halves**: (England) Tom Cairns; (England) Jake Murray; (Italy) **Stephen Varney**; (England) Sam Wolstenholme; **Fly-halves**: (England) Will Haydon-Wood; (England) Harvey Skinner	**Centres**: (England) Will Butt; (New Zealand) **Dallas McLeod**; (England) **Henry Slade** (Note: Henry Slade is jointly contracted with the RFU, via an enhanced England Elite Player Squad (EPS) contract.); (England) Zack Wimbush; **Wings**: (England) Paul Brown-Bampoe; (England) **Immanuel Feyi-Waboso** (Note: Immanuel Feyi-Waboso is jointly contracted with the RFU, via an enhanced England Elite Player Squad (EPS) contract.); (England) Ben Hammersley; (England) Campbell Ridl; **Fullbacks**: (England) Sam Harris; (England) Olly Woodburn; (England) Tom Wyatt
**(c)** denotes the team captain. **Bold** denotes internationally capped players. Source:

=== Academy squad ===
The Exeter Chiefs Academy squad is:

Exeter Chiefs 2026–27 Senior Academy squad
**Props**: (England) Josh Mann; **Hookers**: (England) Louie Gulley; **Locks**: (England) Joe Bailey; (England) Oscar Beckerleg; (England) Luke Evans	**Back row**: (England) Finn Worley-Brady; **Scrum-halves**: (England) George Newman; **Fly-halves**: (England) Ben Coen	**Centres**: (England) Nic Allison; (England) Ollie Batson; (England) Nick Lilley; **Wingers**: (England) Noah Fenton; **Fullbacks**
Italics denotes U20 international. Source:

== Club staff ==
First Team Coaching

Role	Name
Director of Rugby	(England) Rob Baxter
Head coach	(England) Rob Hunter
Backs and Attack coach	(England) Ali Hepher
Assistant Forwards coach	(England) Ross McMillan
Skills coach	(England) Ricky Pellow
Defence coach	(England) Haydn Thomas

Academy

Role	Name
Academy manager	(England) Rob Gibson

== Notable former players ==
=== Lions tourists ===
The following players have toured with the Lions while playing for Exeter:

- 2017: Jack Nowell, Tomas Francis
- 2021: Stuart Hogg, Sam Simmonds, Jonny Hill, Luke Cowan-Dickie

=== Rugby World Cup ===
The following are players which have represented their countries at the Rugby World Cup, whilst playing for Exeter:

Tournament	Players selected	England players	Other national team players
2003	3	-	Richard Liddington (United States) , Siaosi Vaili, Opeta Palepoi (Samoa)
2011	3	-	Gonzalo Camacho (Argentina) , Junior Poluleuligaga (Samoa) , Craig Mitchell (Wales)
2015	7	Geoff Parling, Jack Nowell, Henry Slade	Tomas Francis (Wales) , Chrysander Botha (Namibia) , Elvis Taione (Tonga) , Michele Campagnaro (Italy)
2019	6	Luke Cowan-Dickie, Jack Nowell, Henry Slade	Stuart Hogg (Scotland) , Nic White (Australia) , Tomas Francis (Wales)
2023	3		Dafydd Jenkins, Christ Tshiunza (Wales) , Nika Abuladze (Georgia (country))

== Notes ==
Academy squad
