= 2025 Six Nations Under 20s Championship =

Under 20 Rugby union competition

- Date: 30 January – 14 March 2025
- Countries: England; France; Ireland; Italy; Scotland; Wales

Tournament statistics
- Champions: France (4th title)
- Matches played: 15
- Tries scored: 100 (6.67 per match)
- Top point scorer: 38 – Ben Coen (England)
- Top try scorer: 7 – Lyam Akrab (France)
- Official website: sixnationsrugby.com

The 2025 Six Nations Under 20s Championship was the 18th Six Nations Under 20s Championship, an annual northern hemisphere rugby union tournament contested by the under-20 men's national teams of England, France, Ireland, Italy, Scotland and Wales. England were the reigning champions, having won their 10th title in 2024, and went into the final day of this year's competition with a chance to win a second straight Six Nations title for the first time since 2013; however, France's 45–40 victory over Scotland in Paris meant France won their fourth Six Nations title, their first since 2018.

== Table ==
Pos	Team	Pld	W	D	L	PF	PA	PD	TF	TA	TB	LB	Pts
1	France	5	4	0	1	198	103	+95	30	14	4	0	20
2	England	5	4	0	1	149	73	+76	19	9	2	0	18
3	Wales	5	3	0	2	94	133	−39	12	18	0	0	12
4	Italy	5	2	0	3	84	133	−49	12	21	1	1	10
5	Scotland	5	1	0	4	105	169	−64	16	26	2	1	7
6	Ireland	5	1	0	4	72	91	−19	11	12	1	1	6

Source: Six Nations Rugby

Table ranking rules:

- Four match points are awarded for a win.
- Two match points are awarded for a draw.
- A bonus match point is awarded to a team that scores four or more tries in a match or loses a match by seven points or fewer. If a team scores four tries in a match and loses by seven points or fewer, they are awarded both bonus points.
- Three bonus match points are awarded to a team that wins all five of their matches (known as a Grand Slam). This ensures that a Grand Slam winning team reaches a minimum of 23 points, and thus always ranks over a team who won four matches in which they also were awarded four try bonus points and were also awarded two bonus points (a try bonus and a losing bonus) in the match that they lost for a total of 22 points.
- Tie-breakers
  - If two or more teams are tied on match points, the team with the better points difference (points scored less points conceded) is ranked higher.
  - If the above tie-breaker fails to separate tied teams, the team that scored the higher number of total tries in their matches is ranked higher.
  - If two or more teams remain tied for first place at the end of the championship after applying the above tiebreakers, the title is shared between them.

== Fixtures ==
The fixtures for the tournament were announced on 7 August 2024.

=== Week 1 ===
30 January 2025
19:45

Ireland	3–19	England
Pen: Wisniewski 30'	Report	Try: Penalty try 67'; Pen: Coen (4) 12', 27', 33', 79'

Musgrave Park, Cork
Referee: Jérémy Rozier (France)

FB	15	Charlie Molony
RW	14	Derry Moloney
OC	13	Connor Fahy
IC	12	Eoghan Smyth		(substituted off) 54'
LW	11	Ciaran Mangan
FH	10	Sam Wisniewski		(substituted off) 61'
SH	9	Clark Logan		(substituted off) 67'
N8	8	Éanna McCarthy (c)
OF	7	Bobby Power		(substituted off) 65'
BF	6	Michael Foy
RL	5	Billy Corrigan
LL	4	Mahon Ronan		(substituted off) 66'
TP	3	Alex Mullan		(substituted off) 50'
HK	2	Henry Walker		(substituted off) 50'
LP	1	Alex Usanov		(substituted off) 14'
Replacements:
HK	16	Connor Magee		(substituted on) 50'
PR	17	Billy Bohan		(substituted on) 14'
PR	18	Tom McAllister		(substituted on) 50'
LK	19	David Walsh		(substituted on) 66'
BR	20	Oisin Minogue	(yellow card) 67'	(substituted on) 65'
SH	21	Andrew Doyle		(substituted on) 67'
CE	22	Gene O'Leary Kareem		(substituted on) 54'
FH	23	Daniel Green		(substituted on) 61'
Coach:
Neil Doak

FB	15	Jack Kinder		(substituted off) 71'
RW	14	Jack Bracken
OC	13	Angus Hall
IC	12	Nic Allison		(substituted off) 74'
LW	11	Charlie Griffin
FH	10	Ben Coen
SH	9	Archie McParland		(substituted off) 25'
N8	8	Kane James
OF	7	Henry Pollock
BF	6	Junior Kpoku	(red card) 13'	(substituted off) 34'
RL	5	Tom Burrow (c)
LL	4	Olamide Sodeke		(substituted off) 78'
TP	3	Billy Sela		(substituted off) 76'
HK	2	Kepu Tuipulotu		(substituted off) 73'
LP	1	Ralph McEachran		(substituted off) 78'
Replacements:
HK	16	Louie Gulley		(substituted on) 73'
PR	17	Oli Scola		(substituted on) 78'
PR	18	Tye Raymont		(substituted on) 76'
LK	19	Aiden Ainsworth-Cave		(substituted on) 78'
FL	20	George Timmins		(substituted on) 34'
SH	21	Lucas Friday		(substituted on) 25'
FH	22	Josh Bellamy		(substituted on) 71'
WG	23	Nick Lilley		(substituted on) 74'
Coach:
Mark Mapletoft

31 January 2025
19:15

Scotland	10–22	Italy
Try: Allen 15' m Duncan 71' m	Report	Try: Zanandrea 29' c Beni 45' m Todaro 61' c Con: Fasti (2/3) 30', 62'; Pen: Fasti (1/2) 78'

Edinburgh Rugby Stadium, Edinburgh
Referee: Sara Cox (England)

FB	15	Jack Brown
RW	14	Guy Rogers
OC	13	Johnny Ventisei (c)
IC	12	Kerr Yule
LW	11	Fergus Watson	(substituted off) 65'
FH	10	Matthew Urwin	(substituted off) 77'
SH	9	Noah Cowan	(substituted off) 50'
N8	8	Reuben Logan
OF	7	Billy Allen
BF	6	Christian Lindsay	(substituted off) 50'
RL	5	Dan Halkon
LL	4	Charlie Moss	(substituted off) 50'
TP	3	Ollie Blyth-Lafferty	(substituted off) 79'
HK	2	Joe Roberts	(substituted off) 62'
LP	1	Oliver McKenna	(substituted off) 59'
Replacements:
HK	16	Seb Stephen	(substituted on) 62'
PR	17	Jake Shearer	(substituted on) 59'
PR	18	Ryan Whitefield	(substituted on) 79'
LK	19	Bart Godsell	(substituted on) 50'
BR	20	Oliver Duncan	(substituted on) 50'
BR	21	Hector Patterson	(substituted on) 50'
SH	22	Ross Wolfenden	(substituted on) 77'
CE	23	Nairn Moncrieff	(substituted on) 65'
Coach:
Kenny Murray

FB	15	Gianmarco Pietramala	(substituted off) 50'
RW	14	Jules Ducros
OC	13	Federico Zanandrea	(substituted off) 79'
IC	12	Edoardo Todaro
LW	11	Malik Faissal
FH	10	Roberto Fasti
SH	9	Niccolò Beni	(substituted off) 66'
N8	8	Giacomo Milano (c)
OF	7	Nelson Casartelli	(substituted off) 64'
BF	6	Anthony Miranda
RL	5	Enoch Opoku-Gyamfi	(substituted off) 51'
LL	4	Tommaso Redondi
TP	3	Bruno Vallesi	(substituted off) 75'
HK	2	Alessio Caiolo-Serra	(substituted off) 69'
LP	1	Sergio Pelliccioli	(substituted off) 69'
Replacements:
HK	16	Giacomo Casiraghi	(substituted on) 69'
PR	17	Christian Brasini	(substituted on) 75'
PR	18	Nicola Bolognini	(substituted on) 69'
LK	19	Pietro Melegari	(substituted on) 51'
FL	20	Carlo Antonio Bianchi	(substituted on) 64'
SH	21	Matteo Bellotto	(substituted on) 66'
FH	22	Pietro Celi	(substituted on) 50'
WG	23	Giacomo Ndoumbe Lobe	(substituted on) 79'
Coach:
Roberto Santamaria

1 February 2025
20:10

(1 BP) France	63–19	Wales
Try: Akrab (2) 3' c, 40' c Pacome 27' c Mousques (2) 50' c, 56' c Boirie 54' c Taccola 71' c Llaveria 77' c Njocke 80' c Con: Jurd (9/9) 4', 27', 40+1', 51', 54', 57', 72', 78', 80+1'	Report	Try: Boshoff 16' m Thomas (2) 38' c, 60' c Con: Wilde 39'; Ford 61'

Stade de la Rabine, Vannes
Referee: Tomas Bertazza (Argentina)

FB	15	Ugo Pacome	(substituted off) 67'
RW	14	Mathis Ibo	(substituted off) 43'
OC	13	Robin Taccola
IC	12	Lucas Vignères
LW	11	Xan Mousques
FH	10	Diego Jurd
SH	9	Baptiste Tilloles	(substituted off) 49'
N8	8	Elyjah Ibsaiene	(substituted off) 59'
OF	7	Marceau Marzullo	(substituted off) 43'	(substituted on) 68'	(substituted off) 78'
BF	6	Antoine Deliance
RL	5	Corentin Mézou (c)
LL	4	Bartholomé Sanson
TP	3	Owen Sorhaindo	(substituted off) 43'
HK	2	Lyam Akrab	(substituted off) 59'
LP	1	Samuel Jean-Christophe	(substituted off) 55'
Replacements:
HK	16	Quentin Algay	(substituted on) 59'
PR	17	Edouard-Junior Jabea Njocke	(substituted on) 55'
PR	18	Mohamed Megherbi	(substituted on) 43'
LK	19	Raphael Darquier	(substituted on) 59'
BR	20	Sialevailea Tolofua	(substituted on) 43'	(substituted off) 68'	(substituted on) 78'
BR	21	Nathan Llaveria	(substituted on) 49'
SH	22	Luka Keletaona	(substituted on) 67'
CE	23	Fabien Brau-Boirie	(substituted on) 43'
Coach:
Cédric Laborde

FB	15	Scott Delnevo	(substituted off) 49'
RW	14	Harry Rees-Weldon
OC	13	Elijah Evans
IC	12	Steffan Emanuel
LW	11	Aidan Boshoff
FH	10	Harri Wilde	(substituted off) 55'
SH	9	Logan Franklin	(substituted off) 68'
N8	8	Evan Minto
OF	7	Harry Beddall (c)
BF	6	Deian Gwynne
RL	5	Nick Thomas	(substituted off) 39'
LL	4	Kenzie Jenkins	(substituted off) 68'
TP	3	Sam Scott	(substituted off) 40'
HK	2	Harry Thomas	(substituted off) 61'
LP	1	Ioan Emanuel	(substituted off) 61'
Replacements:
HK	16	Saul Hurley	(substituted on) 61'
PR	17	Louie Trevett	(substituted on) 61'
PR	18	Jac Pritchard	(substituted on) 40'
LK	19	Tom Cottle	(substituted on) 68'
FL	20	Dan Gemine	(substituted on) 39'
SH	21	Carwyn Edwards	(substituted on) 68'
FH	22	Harri Ford	(substituted on) 55'
WG	23	Tom Bowen	(substituted on) 49'
Coach:
Richard Whiffin

=== Week 2 ===
7 February 2025
19:15

(1 BP) Italy	18–20	Wales
Try: Ducros 15' m Casartelli 39' c Con: Fasti 40'; Pen: Fasti (2) 1', 54'	Report	Try: Bowen 24' m Thomas (2) 30' m, 49' c Con: Ford 50'; Pen: Ford 69'

Stadio Comunale di Monigo. Treviso
Referee: Morgan White (Hong Kong)

FB	15	Gianmarco Pietramala	(substituted off) 59'
RW	14	Jules Ducros
OC	13	Federico Zanandrea	(substituted off) 72'
IC	12	Edoardo Todaro
LW	11	Malik Faissal
FH	10	Roberto Fasti
SH	9	Niccolò Beni	(substituted off) 63'
N8	8	Giacomo Milano (c)
OF	7	Nelson Casartelli	(substituted off) 63'
BF	6	Anthony Miranda
RL	5	Enoch Opoku-Gyamfi	(substituted off) 14'	(substituted on) 25'	(substituted off) 72'
LL	4	Tommaso Redondi
TP	3	Bruno Vallesi	(substituted off) 59'
HK	2	Alessio Caiolo-Serra	(substituted off) 68'
LP	1	Sergio Pelliccioli	(substituted off) 59'
Replacements:
HK	16	Giacomo Casiraghi	(substituted on) 68'
PR	17	Christian Brasini	(substituted on) 59'
PR	18	Nicola Bolognini	(substituted on) 59'
LK	19	Mattia Midena	(substituted on) 14'	(substituted off) 25'	(substituted on) 72'
FL	20	Carlo Antonio Bianchi	(substituted on) 68'
SH	21	Giulio Sari	(substituted on) 63'
FH	22	Pietro Celi	(substituted on) 59'
CE	23	Riccardo Ioannucci	(substituted on) 72'
Coach:
Roberto Santamaria

FB	15	Scott Delnevo	(substituted off) 68'
RW	14	Aidan Boshoff
OC	13	Osian Roberts
IC	12	Steffan Emanuel
LW	11	Tom Bowen
FH	10	Harri Wilde	(substituted off) 45'
SH	9	Logan Franklin	(substituted off) 59'
N8	8	Evan Minto
OF	7	Harry Beddall (c)
BF	6	Deian Gwynne	(substituted off) 2'	(substituted on) 14'	(substituted off) 70'
RL	5	Dan Gemine
LL	4	Kenzie Jenkins	(substituted off) 68'
TP	3	Sam Scott	(substituted off) 59'
HK	2	Harry Thomas	(substituted off) 62'
LP	1	Louie Trevett	(substituted off) 48'
Replacements:
HK	16	Saul Hurley	(substituted on) 62'
PR	17	Ioan Emanuel	(substituted on) 48'
PR	18	Jac Pritchard	(substituted on) 59'
LK	19	Tom Cottle	(substituted on) 68'
FL	20	Ryan Jones	(substituted on) 2'	(substituted off) 14'	(substituted on) 70'
SH	21	Sion Davies	(substituted on) 59'
FH	22	Harri Ford	(substituted on) 45'
CE	23	Elijah Evans	(substituted on) 68'
Coach:
Richard Whiffin

7 February 2025
20:00

England	27–10	France
Try: James 11' c Hanson 80+1' c Con: Coen (2) 12', 80+2'; Pen: Coen (2) 29', 55'	Report	Try: Britz 34' c Con: Jurd 35'; Pen: Jurd 18'

Recreation Ground, Bath
Referee: Ben Breakspear (Wales)

FB	15	Jack Kinder	(substituted off) 40'
RW	14	Jack Bracken
OC	13	Angus Hall
IC	12	Nic Allison
LW	11	Charlie Griffin	(substituted off) 71'
FH	10	Ben Coen
SH	9	Lucas Friday	(substituted off) 67'
N8	8	Kane James	(substituted off) 63'
OF	7	Henry Pollock
BF	6	George Timmins
RL	5	Tom Burrow (c)
LL	4	Olamide Sodeke
TP	3	Billy Sela	(substituted off) 75'
HK	2	Kepu Tuipulotu	(substituted off) 68'
LP	1	Ralph McEachran	(substituted off) 75'
Replacements:
HK	16	Louie Gulley	(substituted on) 68'
PR	17	Oliver Scola	(substituted on) 75'
PR	18	Tye Raymont	(substituted on) 75'
LK	19	Oscar Beckerleg
LK	20	Aiden Ainsworth-Cave	(substituted on) 63'
SH	21	Dom Hanson	(substituted on) 67'
FH	22	Josh Bellamy	(substituted on) 71'
WG	23	Nick Lilley	(substituted on) 40'
Coach:
Mark Mapletoft

FB	15	Ugo Pacome
RW	14	Oliver Cowie		(substituted off) 52'
OC	13	Fabien Brau-Boirie
IC	12	Robin Taccola
LW	11	Xan Mousques
FH	10	Diego Jurd		(substituted off) 55'
SH	9	Thibaut Motassi
N8	8	Elyjah Ibsaiene
OF	7	Baptiste Britz	(yellow card) 22'	(substituted off) 51'
BF	6	Antoine Deliance (c)			(substituted off) 56'	(substituted on) 66'
RL	5	Corentin Mézou		(substituted off) 55'
LL	4	Bartholomé Sanson		(substituted off) 56'
TP	3	Mohamed Megherbi		(substituted off) 51'
HK	2	Lyam Akrab		(substituted off) 68'
LP	1	Isaac Koffi Sedjoro		(substituted off) 51'	(substituted on) 56'	(substituted off) 66'
Replacements:
HK	16	Quentin Algay		(substituted on) 68'
PR	17	Edouard-Junior Jabea Njocke	(yellow card) 54'	(substituted on) 51'
PR	18	Owen Sorhaindo		(substituted on) 51'
LK	19	Charles Kanté Samba		(substituted on) 55'
FL	20	Raphael Darquier		(substituted on) 56'
FL	21	Sialevailea Tolofua	(yellow card) 59'	(substituted on) 51'
CE	22	Simeli Daunivucu		(substituted on) 52'
FH	23	Jean Cotarmanac'h		(substituted on) 55'
Coach:
Cédric Laborde

8 February 2025
19:45

Scotland	15–33	Ireland (1 BP)
Try: Watson 25' m Roberts 44' m Patterson 63' m	Report	Try: Molony (3) 2', 13', 22'; Corrigan 17'; Minogue 59'; Con: Green (4) 3', 14', 18', 59'

Edinburgh Rugby Stadium, Edinburgh
Referee: Tomas Bertazza (Argentina)

FB	15	Jack Brown
RW	14	Nairn Moncrieff	(substituted off) 73'
OC	13	Johnny Ventisei (c)
IC	12	Kerr Yule
LW	11	Fergus Watson
FH	10	Matthew Urwin	(substituted off) 70'
SH	9	Noah Cowan	(substituted off) 40'
N8	8	Reuben Logan
OF	7	Billy Allen	(substituted off) 40'
BF	6	Christian Lindsay	(substituted off) 58'
RL	5	Dan Halkon
LL	4	Charlie Moss	(substituted off) 40'
TP	3	Ollie Blyth-Lafferty	(substituted off) 65'
HK	2	Joe Roberts
LP	1	Oliver McKenna	(substituted off) 40'
Replacements:
HK	16	Seb Stephen	(substituted on) 40'
PR	17	Jake Shearer	(substituted on) 40'
PR	18	Jamie Stewart	(substituted on) 65'
LK	19	Bart Godsell	(substituted on) 40'
BR	20	Ollie Duncan	(substituted on) 58'
SH	21	Hector Patterson	(substituted on) 40'
FH	22	Ross Wolfenden	(substituted on) 70'
WG	23	Nairn Moncrieff	(substituted on) 73'
Coach:
Kenny Murray

FB	15	Daniel Green
RW	14	Charlie Molony
OC	13	Gene O'Leary Kareem	(substituted off) 65'
IC	12	Connor Fahy
LW	11	Ciaran Mangan
FH	10	Sam Wisniewski	(substituted off) 63'
SH	9	Clark Logan	(substituted off) 60'
N8	8	Eanna McCarthy (c)
OF	7	Bobby Power	(substituted off) 58'
BF	6	Michael Foy
RL	5	Billy Corrigan
LL	4	Mahon Ronan	(substituted off) 64'
TP	3	Alex Mullan	(substituted off) 40'
HK	2	Henry Walker	(substituted off) 52'
LP	1	Billy Bohan	(substituted off) 67'
Replacements:
HK	16	Connor Magee	(substituted on) 52'
PR	17	Patrick Moore	(substituted on) 67'
PR	18	Tom McAllister	(substituted on) 40'
LK	19	David Walsh	(substituted on) 64'
N8	20	Oisin Minogue	(substituted on) 58'
SH	21	Will Wooton	(substituted on) 60'
FH	22	Dylan Hicks	(substituted on) 63'
CE	23	Eoghan Smyth	(substituted on) 65'
Coach:
Neil Doak

=== Week 3 ===
21 February 2025
19:15

(1 BP) England	57–13	Scotland
Try: Ridl 5' m Tuipulotu (2) 12' c, 37' m James 29' c Raymont 32' c Burrow 43' c Pearson 54' c Bracken 58' m Hall 77' c Con: Coen (4) 12', 30', 33', 44'; Bellamy (2) 55', 78'	Report	Try: Watson 8' m Duncan 68' m Pen: Brown 24'

Kingston Park, Newcastle upon Tyne
Referee: Filippo Russo (Italy)

FB	15	George Pearson
RW	14	Jack Bracken	(substituted off) 59'
OC	13	Angus Hall
IC	12	Nick Lilley
LW	11	Campbell Ridl
FH	10	Ben Coen	(substituted off) 49'
SH	9	Lucas Friday	(substituted off) 19'
N8	8	Kane James	(substituted off) 63'
OF	7	George Timmins			(substituted off) 59'
BF	6	Junior Kpoku	(substituted off) 11'	(substituted on) 22'
RL	5	Tom Burrow (c)
LL	4	Olamide Sodeke
TP	3	Tye Raymont	(substituted off) 49'
HK	2	Kepu Tuipulotu	(substituted off) 55'
LP	1	Ralph McEachran	(substituted off) 49'
Replacements:
HK	16	Louie Gulley	(substituted on) 55'
PR	17	Oli Scola	(substituted on) 49'
PR	18	Billy Sela	(substituted on) 49'
LK	19	Aiden Ainsworth-Cave	(substituted on) 63'
FL	20	Connor Treacey	(substituted on) 11'	(substituted off) 22'	(substituted on) 59'
SH	21	Jonny Weimann	(substituted on) 19'
FH	22	Josh Bellamy	(substituted on) 49'
WG	23	Tyler Offiah	(substituted on) 59'
Coach:
Mark Mapletoft

FB	15	Jack Brown
RW	14	Nairn Moncrieff	(substituted off) 40'
OC	13	Campbell Waugh	(substituted off) 59'
IC	12	Kerr Yule
LW	11	Fergus Watson
FH	10	Matthew Urwin
SH	9	Noah Cowan	(substituted off) 64'
N8	8	Reuben Logan	(substituted off) 64'
OF	7	Freddy Douglas (c)
BF	6	Oliver Duncan
RL	5	Dan Halkon
LL	4	Bart Godsell	(substituted off) 50'
TP	3	Ollie Blyth-Lafferty	(substituted off) 64'
HK	2	Seb Stephen	(substituted off) 45'
LP	1	Jake Shearer	(substituted off) 45'
Replacements:
HK	16	Joe Roberts	(substituted on) 45'
PR	17	Oliver McKenna	(substituted on) 45'
PR	18	Jamie Stewart	(substituted on) 64'
LK	19	Charlie Moss	(substituted on) 50'
FL	20	Billy Allen	(substituted on) 64'
SH	21	Hamish MacArthur	(substituted on) 64'
FH	22	Ross Wolfenden	(substituted on) 59'
WG	23	Cameron van Wyk	(substituted on) 40'
Coach:
Kenny Murray

21 February 2025
19:45

Wales	20–12	Ireland
Try: S. Emanuel 14' c Con: Wilde 15'; Pen: Wilde 49'; Ford 78'	Report	Try: Walker 26' m Smyth 39' c Con: Green 40'

Rodney Parade, Newport
Referee: Morgan White (Hong Kong)

FB	15	Jack Woods
RW	14	Aidan Boshoff
OC	13	Osian Roberts	(substituted off) 74'
IC	12	Steffan Emanuel
LW	11	Tom Bowen
FH	10	Harri Wilde	(substituted off) 50'
SH	9	Logan Franklin	(substituted off) 60'
N8	8	Evan Minto
OF	7	Harry Beddall (c)
BF	6	Dan Gemine	(substituted off) 52'
RL	5	Tom Cottle
LL	4	Kenzie Jenkins	(substituted off) 60'
TP	3	Sam Scott	(substituted off) 68'
HK	2	Harry Thomas	(substituted off) 74'
LP	1	Ioan Emanuel	(substituted off) 54'
Replacements:
HK	16	Evan Wood	(substituted on) 74'
PR	17	Louie Trevett	(substituted on) 54'
PR	18	Owain James	(substituted on) 68'
LK	19	Luke Evans	(substituted on) 60'
FL	20	Caio James	(substituted on) 52'
SH	21	Sion Davies	(substituted on) 60'
FH	22	Harri Ford	(substituted on) 50'
CE	23	Elijah Evans	(substituted on) 74'
Coach:
Richard Whiffin

FB	15	Daniel Green
RW	14	Charlie Molony
OC	13	Connor Fahy
IC	12	Eoghan Smyth	(substituted off) 63'
LW	11	Ciaran Mangan
FH	10	Sam Wisniewski	(substituted off) 63'
SH	9	Clark Logan	(substituted off) 73'
N8	8	Éanna McCarthy (c)
OF	7	Bobby Power	(substituted off) 60'
BF	6	Michael Foy
RL	5	Billy Corrigan
LL	4	Mahon Ronan	(substituted off) 54'
TP	3	Tom McAllister	(substituted off) 40'
HK	2	Henry Walker	(substituted off) 60'
LP	1	Billy Bohan	(substituted off) 60'
Replacements:
HK	16	Mikey Yarr	(substituted on) 60'
PR	17	Paddy Moore	(substituted on) 60'
PR	18	Alex Mullan	(substituted on) 40'
LK	19	Conor Kennelly	(substituted on) 54'
LK	20	David Walsh	(substituted on) 60'
SH	21	Will Wooton	(substituted on) 73'
FH	22	Tom Wood	(substituted on) 63'
CE	23	Gene O'Leary Kareem	(substituted on) 63'
Coach:
Neil Doak

22 February 2025
19:45

Italy	5–58	France (1 BP)
Try: Casartelli 80+1' m	Report	Try: Traversier 15' c Rates 19' m Akrab (2) 31' c, 49' c Ibsaiene (2) 40+2' m, 61' m Tolofua 58' c Vigneres 64' c Daunivucu 71' m Con: Keletaona (3/5) 16', 32', 50'; Cotarmanac'h (2/4) 59', 65'; Pen: Keletaona (1/1) 11'

Stadio Comunale di Monigo, Treviso
Referee: Peter Martin (Ireland)

FB	15	Pietro Celi
RW	14	Jules Ducros
OC	13	Federico Zanandrea
IC	12	Edoardo Todaro	(substituted off) 48'
LW	11	Malik Faissal
FH	10	Roberto Fasti	(substituted off) 70'
SH	9	Giulio Sari	(substituted off) 50'
N8	8	Giacomo Milano (c)
OF	7	Nelson Casartelli
BF	6	Antony Miranda	(substituted off) 60'
RL	5	Enoch Opoku-Gyamfi	(substituted off) 40+2'	(substituted on) 42'	(substituted off) 51'
LL	4	Tommaso Redondi
TP	3	Bruno Vallesi	(substituted off) 42'
HK	2	Alessio Caiolo-Serra	(substituted off) 44'
LP	1	Christian Brasini	(substituted off) 51'
Replacements:
HK	16	Giacomo Casiraghi	(substituted on) 44'
PR	17	Sergio Pelliccioli	(substituted on) 51'
PR	18	Nicola Bolognini	(substituted on) 42'
LK	19	Mattia Midena	(substituted on) 40+2'	(substituted off) 42'	(substituted on) 51'
FL	20	Carlo Antonio Bianchi	(substituted on) 60'
SH	21	Matteo Bellotto	(substituted on) 50'
WG	22	Giacomo Ndoumbe Lobe	(substituted on) 70'
CE	23	Riccardo Ioannucci	(substituted on) 48'
Coach:
Roberto Santamaria

FB	15	Mathis Ibo	(substituted off) 63'
RW	14	Tom Levêque
OC	13	Oliver Cowie
IC	12	Simeli Daunivucu
LW	11	Melvyn Rates	(substituted off) 52'
FH	10	Luka Keletaona	(substituted off) 52'
SH	9	Baptiste Tilloles
N8	8	Raphaël Darquier	(substituted off) 7'
OF	7	Sialevailea Tolofua
BF	6	Noa Traversier
RL	5	Corentin Mézou
LL	4	Charles Kante Samba	(substituted off) 57'
TP	3	Mohamed Megherbi	(substituted off) 63'
HK	2	Lyam Akrab	(substituted off) 52'
LP	1	Samuel Jean-Christophe	(substituted off) 48'
Replacements:
HK	16	Quentin Algay	(substituted on) 52'
PR	17	Edouard-Junior Jabea Njocke	(substituted on) 48'
PR	18	Jean-Yves Liufau	(substituted on) 63'
LK	19	Jacques Nguimbous	(substituted on) 57'
N8	20	Elyjah Ibsaiene	(substituted on) 7'
SH	21	Martin Blum	(substituted on) 63'
FH	22	Jean Cotarmanac'h	(substituted on) 52'
CE	23	Lucas Vignères	(substituted on) 52'
Coach:
Cédric Laborde

=== Week 4 ===
7 March 2025
19:15

(1 BP) Scotland	27–12	Wales
Try: Douglas (2) 18' c, 74' m Moncrieff 27' m Brown 34' c Con: Urwin (2/3) 19', 35'; Pen: Coates 66'	Report	Try: I. Emanuel 31' c Thomas 55' m Con: Wilde (1/2) 32'

Edinburgh Rugby Stadium, Edinburgh
Referee: Katsuki Furuse (Japan)

FB	15	Jack Brown
RW	14	Nairn Moncrieff	(substituted off) 67'
OC	13	Angus Hunter
IC	12	Kerr Yule
LW	11	Fergus Watson
FH	10	Matthew Urwin	(substituted off) 57'
SH	9	Noah Cowan	(substituted off) 36'
N8	8	Reuben Logan
OF	7	Freddy Douglas (c)
BF	6	Oliver Duncan	(substituted off) 73'
RL	5	Dan Halkon
LL	4	Charlie Moss	(substituted off) 50'
TP	3	Ollie Blyth-Lafferty	(substituted off) 71'
HK	2	Joe Roberts	(substituted off) 50'
LP	1	Oliver McKenna	(substituted off) 50'
Replacements:
HK	16	Seb Stephen	(substituted on) 50'
PR	17	Jake Shearer	(substituted on) 50'
PR	18	Jamie Stewart	(substituted on) 71'
LK	19	Bart Godsell	(substituted on) 50'
FL	20	Mark Fyffe	(substituted on) 73'
SH	21	Hamish MacArthur	(substituted on) 36'
FH	22	Isaac Coates	(substituted on) 57'
WG	23	Cameron van Wyk	(substituted on) 67'
Coach:
Kenny Murray

FB	15	Tom Bowen
RW	14	Harry Rees-Weldon		(substituted off) 61'
OC	13	Elijah Evans
IC	12	Steffan Emanuel
LW	11	Aidan Boshoff
FH	10	Harri Ford		(substituted off) 17'
SH	9	Logan Franklin	(red card) 25'
N8	8	Evan Minto		(substituted off) 45'	(substituted on) 53'	(substituted off) 68'
OF	7	Harry Beddall(c)
BF	6	Deian Gwynne
RL	5	Tom Cottle	(red card) 36'
LL	4	Kenzie Jenkins
TP	3	Sam Scott		(substituted off) 68'
HK	2	Harry Thomas		(substituted off) 68'
LP	1	Ioan Emanuel		(substituted off) 50'
Replacements:
HK	16	Evan Wood		(substituted on) 68'
PR	17	Louie Trevett		(substituted on) 50'
PR	18	Owain James		(substituted on) 68'
LK	19	Luke Evans		(substituted on) 61'
FL	20	Caio James		(substituted on) 45'	(substituted off) 53'	(substituted on) 68'
SH	21	Sion Davies
FH	22	Harri Wilde		(substituted on) 17'	(substituted off) 68'
CE	23	Elis Price			(substituted on) 68'
Coach:
Richard Whiffin

7 March 2025
19:45

(1 BP) England	33–24	Italy (1 BP)
Try: Timmins 12' c Burrow 18' c Gulley 21' c Hall 58' c Bracken 80+1' m Con: Bellamy (4/4) 13', 18', 22', 59'	Report	Try: Faissal (2) 8' c, 16' m Casartelli 56' m Drago 77' c Con: Fasti (1/3) 9'; Todaro (1/1) 78'

Recreation Ground, Bath
Referee: Lex Weiner (United States)

FB	15	George Pearson
RW	14	Jack Bracken	(yellow card) 47'
OC	13	Angus Hall
IC	12	Nic Allison
LW	11	Campbell Ridl		(substituted off) 59'
FH	10	Josh Bellamy		(substituted off) 69'
SH	9	Dom Hanson		(substituted off) 57'
N8	8	Kane James
OF	7	George Timmins		(substituted off) 63'
BF	6	Junior Kpoku
RL	5	Tom Burrow (c)		(substituted off) 69'
LL	4	Olamide Sodeke		(substituted off) 74'
TP	3	Tye Raymont
HK	2	Louie Gulley		(substituted off) 57'
LP	1	Oli Scola		(substituted off) 47'
Replacements:
HK	16	Kepu Tuipulotu		(substituted on) 57'
PR	17	Ralph McEachran		(substituted on) 47'
PR	18	Tubuna Maka		(substituted on) 74'
LK	19	Oscar Beckerleg		(substituted on) 69'
FL	20	Connor Treacey		(substituted on) 63'
SH	21	Joe Davis		(substituted on) 57'
FH	22	Ollie Davies		(substituted on) 69'
FB	23	Jack Kinder		(substituted on) 59'
Coach:
Mark Mapletoft

FB	15	Roberto Fasti
RW	14	Alessandro Drago
OC	13	Edoardo Todaro
IC	12	Jules Ducros
LW	11	Malik Faissal	(substituted off) 63'
FH	10	Pietro Celi
SH	9	Matteo Bellotto	(substituted off) 65'
N8	8	Giacomo Milano (c)	(substituted off) 72'
OF	7	Nelson Casartelli
BF	6	Carlo Antonio Bianchi
RL	5	Enoch Opoku-Gyamfi	(substituted off) 48'
LL	4	Mattia Midena	(substituted off) 69'
TP	3	Bruno Vallesi	(substituted off) 65'
HK	2	Nicolò Michele Corvasce	(substituted off) 63'
LP	1	Sergio Pelliccioli	(substituted off) 65'
Replacements:
HK	16	Giacomo Casiraghi	(substituted on) 63'
PR	17	Gioele Boccato	(substituted on) 65'
PR	18	Nicola Bolognini	(substituted on) 65'
LK	19	Pietro Melegari	(substituted on) 72'
FL	20	Simone Fardin	(substituted on) 69'
LK	21	Tommaso Redondi	(substituted on) 48'
SH	22	Niccolò Beni	(substituted on) 65'
CE	23	Federico Zanandrea	(substituted on) 63'
Coach:
Roberto Santamaria

7 March 2025
20:00

Ireland	12–22	France (1 BP)
Try: Penalty try 45'; Mangan 80+2' m	Report	Try: Echegaray 15' m Levêque 19' m Akrab (2) 34' m, 53' c Con: Keletaona (1/4) 54'

Musgrave Park, Cork
Referee: Griffin Colby (South Africa)

FB	15	Daniel Green
RW	14	Charlie Molony
OC	13	Gene O'Leary Kareem
IC	12	Eoghan Smyth	(substituted off) 69'
LW	11	Ciarán Mangan
FH	10	Tom Wood	(substituted off) 68'
SH	9	Will Wooton	(substituted off) 62'
N8	8	Éanna McCarthy (c)
OF	7	Bobby Power	(substituted off) 57'
BF	6	Michael Foy
RL	5	Billy Corrigan
LL	4	Mahon Ronan	(substituted off) 57'
TP	3	Alex Mullan	(substituted off) 51'
HK	2	Mikey Yarr	(substituted off) 51'
LP	1	Billy Bohan	(substituted off) 62'
Replacements:
HK	16	Henry Walker	(substituted on) 51'
PR	17	Paddy Moore	(substituted on) 62'
PR	18	Tom McAllister	(substituted on) 51'
LK	19	Conor Kennelly	(substituted on) 57'
LK	20	David Walsh	(substituted on) 57'
SH	21	Clark Logan	(substituted on) 62'
FH	22	Sam Wisniewski	(substituted on) 68'
CE	23	Connor Fahy	(substituted on) 69'
Coach:
Neil Doak

FB	15	Jon Echegaray	(yellow card) 39'
RW	14	Tom Levêque
OC	13	Simeli Daunivucu
IC	12	Fabien Brau-Boirie		(substituted off) 72'
LW	11	Nolann Donguy
FH	10	Luka Keletaona		(substituted off) 60'
SH	9	Baptiste Tilloles		(substituted off) 60'
N8	8	Baptiste Britz		(substituted off) 52'
OF	7	Noa Traversier	(yellow card) 32'
BF	6	Antoine Deliance
RL	5	Corentin Mézou (c)
LL	4	Bartholome Sanson	(yellow card) 38'	(substituted off) 57'
TP	3	Mohamed Megherbi		(substituted off) 52'
HK	2	Lyam Akrab		(substituted off) 66'
LP	1	Samuel Jean-Christophe		(substituted off) 65'
Replacements:
HK	16	Quentin Algay		(substituted on) 66'
PR	17	Edouard-Junior Jabea Njocke		(substituted on) 52'
PR	18	Jean-Yves Liufau		(substituted on) 65'
LK	19	Jacques Nguimbous		(substituted on) 52'
FL	20	Sialevailea Tolofua		(substituted on) 57'
SH	21	Simon Daroque		(substituted on) 60'
FH	22	Jean Cotarmanac'h		(substituted on) 60'
CE	23	Oliver Cowie		(substituted on) 72'
Coach:
Cédric Laborde

=== Week 5 ===
14 March 2025
19:30

Wales	23–13	England
Try: S. Emanuel 34' c Rees-Weldon 42' c Con: Wilde (2/2) 35', 43'; Pen: Wilde (3/3) 19', 30', 70'	Report	Try: McEachran 3' c Con: Coen (1/1) 4'; Pen: Coen (2/2) 22', 25'

Cardiff Arms Park, Cardiff
Referee: Griffin Colby (South Africa)

FB	15	Tom Bowen		(substituted off) 50'	(substituted on) 63'
RW	14	Harry Rees-Weldon				(substituted off) 73'
OC	13	Osian Roberts
IC	12	Steffan Emanuel		(substituted off) 80'
LW	11	Aidan Boshoff
FH	10	Harri Wilde
SH	9	Sion Davies		(substituted off) 80'
N8	8	Evan Minto		(substituted off) 58'
OF	7	Harry Beddall (c)
BF	6	Deian Gwynne
RL	5	Dan Gemine	(yellow card) 12'
LL	4	Kenzie Jenkins		(substituted off) 75'
TP	3	Sam Scott		(substituted off) 75'
HK	2	Harry Thomas		(substituted off) 80'
LP	1	Ioan Emanuel		(substituted off) 63'
Replacements:
HK	16	Evan Wood		(substituted on) 80'
PR	17	Louie Trevett		(substituted on) 63'
PR	18	Owain James		(substituted on) 75'
LK	19	Luke Evans		(substituted on) 75'
FL	20	Caio James		(substituted on) 58'
SH	21	Carwyn Edwards		(substituted on) 80'
CE	22	Elis Price		(substituted on) 80'
FB	23	Jack Woods		(substituted on) 50'	(substituted off) 63'	(substituted on) 73'
Coach:
Richard Whiffin

FB	15	George Pearson		(substituted off) 56'
RW	14	Jack Bracken	(yellow card) 72'
OC	13	Angus Hall
IC	12	Nic Allison		(substituted off) 64'
LW	11	Jack Kinder
FH	10	Ben Coen
SH	9	Dom Hanson		(substituted off) 45'
N8	8	Kane James
OF	7	George Timmins		(substituted off) 45'
BF	6	Junior Kpoku
RL	5	Tom Burrow (c)
LL	4	Olamide Sodeke		(substituted off) 63'
TP	3	Tye Raymont		(substituted off) 76'
HK	2	Kepu Tuipulotu		(substituted off) 69'
LP	1	Ralph McEachran
Replacements:
HK	16	Louie Gulley		(substituted on) 69'
PR	17	Oli Scola
PR	18	Tubuna Maka		(substituted on) 76'
LK	19	Aiden Ainsworth-Cave	(yellow card) 80'	(substituted on) 63'
FL	20	Connor Treacey		(substituted on) 45'
SH	21	Joe Davis		(substituted on) 45'
FH	22	Josh Bellamy		(substituted on) 56'
CE	23	Nick Lilley		(substituted on) 64'
Coach:
Mark Mapletoft

14 March 2025
19:45

Italy	15–12	Ireland (1 BP)
Try: Drago 7' m Caiolo-Serra 12' c Con: Celi (1/2) 13'; Pen: Celi (1/1) 2'	Report	Try: Walker 47' m Wood 62' c Con: Wisniewski (1/1) 63'

Stadio Comunale di Monigo, Treviso
Referee: Katsuki Furuse (Japan)

FB	15	Gianmarco Pietramala		(substituted off) 5'	(substituted on) 14'	(substituted off) 57'
RW	14	Alessandro Drago
OC	13	Federico Zanandrea
IC	12	Edoardo Todaro
LW	11	Malik Faissal
FH	10	Pietro Celi		(substituted off) 74'
SH	9	Niccolò Beni		(substituted off) 66'
N8	8	Giacomo Milano (c)		(substituted off) 63'
OF	7	Nelson Casartelli
BF	6	Anthony Italo Miranda	(yellow card) 53'
RL	5	Tommaso Redondi
LL	4	Mattia Midena		(substituted off) 54'
TP	3	Bruno Vallesi		(substituted off) 24'
HK	2	Nicolò Michele Corvasce	(yellow card) 3'			(substituted off) 54'
LP	1	Christian Brasini		(substituted off) 48'
Replacements:
HK	16	Alessio Caiolo-Serra		(substituted on) 5'	(substituted off) 14'	(substituted on) 54'
PR	17	Sergio Pelliccioli		(substituted on) 48'
PR	18	Nicola Bolognini		(substituted on) 24'
N8	19	Enoch Opoku-Gyamfi		(substituted on) 54'
FL	20	Carlo Antonio Bianchi		(substituted on) 63'
SH	21	Matteo Bellotto		(substituted on) 66'
FH	22	Roberto Fasti				(substituted on) 57'
CE	23	Riccardo Ioannucci		(substituted on) 74'
Coach:
Roberto Santamaria

FB	15	Daniel Green	(substituted off) 60'
RW	14	Charlie Molony
OC	13	Ciarán Mangan
IC	12	Eoghan Smyth
LW	11	Gene O'Leary Kareem	(substituted off) 69'
FH	10	Tom Wood
SH	9	Clark Logan	(substituted off) 78'
N8	8	Éanna McCarthy (c)
OF	7	Michael Foy
BF	6	David Walsh	(substituted off) 41'
RL	5	Billy Corrigan
LL	4	Mahon Ronan	(substituted off) 54'
TP	3	Alex Mullan	(substituted off) 54'
HK	2	Henry Walker	(substituted off) 54'
LP	1	Billy Bohan	(substituted off) 58'
Replacements:
HK	16	Mikey Yarr	(substituted on) 54'
PR	17	Paddy Moore	(substituted on) 58'
PR	18	Tom McAllister	(substituted on) 54'
LK	19	Conor Kennelly	(substituted on) 54'
FL	20	Bobby Power	(substituted on) 41'
SH	21	Chris O'Connor	(substituted on) 78'
FH	22	Sam Wisniewski	(substituted on) 60'
CE	23	Connor Fahy	(substituted on) 69'
Coach:
Neil Doak

14 March 2025
20:15

(1 BP) France	45–40	Scotland (2 BP)
Try: Daunivucu 1' c Akrab 13' c Tilloles 20' m Cowie 23' c Echegaray (2) 34' c, 46' m Cotarmanac'h 59' c Con: Cotarmanac'h (5/7) 2', 13', 24', 35', 59'	Report	Try: Brown 6' c Watson 27' m Blyth-Lafferty 37' c Van Wyk 54' m Douglas 73' c Con: Urwin (2/4) 7', 38'; Brown (1/1) 74'; Pen: Urwin (2/2) 18', 43'; Drop: Urwin (1/1) 80'

Stade Jean-Bouin, Paris
Referee: Lex Weiner (United States)

FB	15	Jon Echegaray
RW	14	Nolann Donguy		(substituted off) 15'
OC	13	Oliver Cowie
IC	12	Simeli Daunivucu		(substituted off) 72'
LW	11	Xan Mousques
FH	10	Jean Cotarmanac'h
SH	9	Baptiste Tilloles		(substituted off) 52'
N8	8	Antoine Chalus-Cercy	(yellow card) 5'	(substituted off) 52'
OF	7	Noa Traversier
BF	6	Antoine Deliance (c)
RL	5	Jacques Nguimbous		(substituted off) 47'
LL	4	Charles Kante Samba
TP	3	Mohamed Megherbi		(substituted off) 64'	(substituted on) 79'
HK	2	Lyam Akrab		(substituted off) 79'
LP	1	Samuel Jean-Christophe		(substituted off) 56'
Replacements:
HK	16	Quentin Algay		(substituted on) 79'
PR	17	Lorencio Boyer Gallardo		(substituted on) 56'
PR	18	Jean-Yves Liufau		(substituted on) 64'	(substituted off) 79'
LK	19	Corentin Mézou		(substituted on) 47'
N8	20	Mathis Baret		(substituted on) 52'
SH	21	Simon Daroque		(substituted on) 52'
FB	22	Ugo Pacome		(substituted on) 15'
CE	23	Mathys Belaubre		(substituted on) 72'
Coach:
Cédric Laborde

FB	15	Jack Brown
RW	14	Nairn Moncrieff	(substituted off) 51'
OC	13	Angus Hunter
IC	12	Kerr Yule	(substituted off) 67'
LW	11	Fergus Watson
FH	10	Matthew Urwin
SH	9	Noah Cowan	(substituted off) 75'
N8	8	Reuben Logan
OF	7	Freddy Douglas (c)
BF	6	Oliver Duncan	(substituted off) 69'
RL	5	Dan Halkon
LL	4	Bart Godsell	(substituted off) 69'
TP	3	Ollie Blyth-Lafferty	(substituted off) 69'
HK	2	Seb Stephen	(substituted off) 51'
LP	1	Oliver McKenna	(substituted off) 51'
Replacements:
HK	16	Joe Roberts	(substituted on) 51'
PR	17	Jake Shearer	(substituted on) 51'
PR	18	Jamie Stewart	(substituted on) 69'
LK	19	Charlie Moss	(substituted on) 69'
FL	20	Mark Fyffe	(substituted on) 69'
SH	21	Hamish MacArthur	(substituted on) 75'
FH	22	Ross Wolfenden	(substituted on) 67'
WG	23	Cameron van Wyk	(substituted on) 51'
Coach:
Kenny Murray

== See also ==
- 2025 Six Nations Championship
