= 2024 World Rugby U20 Championship =

International youth rugby union championship tournament

Tournament details
- Host: South Africa
- Venue: 3
- Date: 29 June – 19 July 2024 (21 days)
- Teams: 12

Final positions
- Champions: England (4th title)
- Runner-up: France
- Third place: New Zealand
- Fourth place: Ireland

Tournament statistics
- Matches played: 29
- Tries scored: 212 (7.31 per match)
- Top scorer(s): Hugo Reus (57)
- Most tries: Juan Greising Revol (5)

The 2024 World Rugby U20 Championship was the 14th edition of the premier age-grade (World Rugby Under-20 Championship) rugby union competition. The tournament was hosted in South Africa for the third time, previously being held in 2012 and 2023. Played over twenty-one days in the Western Cape locations of Stellenbosch and Cape Town, the U20 Championship features the twelve best U20 nations in the world competing for the world title.

The defending champions were France whom had won the previous three tournaments back-to-back.

England won the competition defeating France in the final, 21–13. Going into the tournament, the two finalists had met each other earlier in the year (March 2024) at the 2024 U20 Six Nations Championship. England had also won that fixture, 31–45.

== Teams ==
The teams participating in the tournament are listed in the table below, with a summary of their previous best results at the World Rugby Under 20 Championship included.

Team	No.	Result (2023)	Best Result
Argentina	13	9th	Third place (2016)
Australia	13	5th	Runners-up (2010, 2019)
England	13	4th	Champions (2013, 2014, 2016)
Fiji	9	10th	Sixth place (2011)
France	13	1st	Champions (2018, 2019, 2023)
Georgia	5	8th	Eighth place (2023)
Ireland	13	2nd	Runners-up (2016, 2023)
Italy	11	11th	Eighth place (2017, 2018)
New Zealand	13	7th	Champions (2008, 2009, 2010, 2011, 2015, 2017)
South Africa	13	3rd	Champions (2012)
Spain	—N/a		Debut
Wales	13	6th	Runners-up (2013)

== Match officials ==
The following officials were named for the tournament, with an official panel of 9 referees designated to oversee the game.

Referees

- Saba Abulashvili (Georgia)
- Takehito Namekawa (Japan)
- Federico Vedovelli (Italy)
- Reuben Keane (Australia)
- Jérémy Rozier (France)
- Morné Ferreira (South Africa)
- Adam Jones (Wales)
- Sam Grove-White (Scotland)
- Aimee Barrett-Theron (South Africa)
- Neheun Jauri Rivero (Argentina)

Television match officials / Split Screen Operator

- Matteo Liperini (Italy)
- Mark Patton (Ireland)
- Mike Adamson (Scotland)
- Damon Murphy (Australia)
- Tual Trainini (France)
- Ian Tempest (England)
- Ben Whitehouse (Wales)
- Andrew McMenemy (Scotland)
- Andrew Jackson (England)
- Quinton Immelman (South Africa)

== Venues ==
The host locations were announced in February 2024. Similar to the previous tournament (2023), also hosted by South Africa, the Danie Craven Stadium and Athlone Stadium are hosting tournament matches with the final to be played at Cape Town Stadium.

Stellenbosch	Athlone (Cape Town)	Cape Town
Danie Craven Stadium	Athlone Stadium	Cape Town Stadium
Capacity: 16,000	Capacity: 34,000	Capacity: 58,310
Stadia locations within the province of Western Cape.

== Pool stage ==
=== Pool A ===
Pos	Team	Pld	W	D	L	PF	PA	PD	TF	TA	TB	LB	Pts	Qualification
1	New Zealand	3	3	0	0	113	73	+40	17	9	3	0	15	Advance to Semi-finals
2	France	3	2	0	1	104	50	+54	14	7	2	1	11	Advance to Semi-finals
3	Wales	3	1	0	2	76	80	−4	10	11	2	1	7	
4	Spain	3	0	0	3	35	125	−90	4	18	0	0	0	

Updated to match(es) played on 10 July 2024. Source: World Rugby

29 June
14:00 SAST (UTC+02)

France	49–12	Spain
Try: Desperes 3' c Massa (2) 21' c, 27' c Penalty try 41'; Brau-Boirie 61' c Malaterre (2) 73' c, 75' c Con: Reus (6/6) 4', 22', 28', 61', 74', 76'	Report	Try: González 47' c Burguillos 78' m Con: Otamendi (1/1) 48'

DHL Stadium, Cape Town
Referee: Federico Vedovelli (Italy)

29 June
19:00 SAST (UTC+02)

Wales	34–41	New Zealand
Try: Anderson 11' m Hennessey (2) 42' m, 55' c Emanuel 73' c Page 79' c Con: Wilde (1/3) 56'; Ford (2/2) 74', 79'; Pen: Wilde (1/1) 22'	Report	Try: Pledger 8' c Penalty try 25'; Taele (2) 35' c, 44' m Cribb 51' c Tito-Harris 67' m Con: Simpson (3/4) 9', 35', 52'; Williams (0/1); Pen: Simpson (1/1) 21'

Athlone Stadium, Cape Town
Referee: Morné Ferreira (South Africa)

4 July
14:00 SAST (UTC+02)

Wales	31–10	Spain
Try: Stone 1' c Evans 27' c I. Emanuel 42' c Davies 58' c Con: Ford (3/3) 2', 27', 43'; S. Emanuel (1/1) 60'; Pen: Ford (1/1) 15'	Report	Try: Guirao 36' c Con: Otamendi (1/1) 37'; Pen: Otamendi (1/1) 5'

Athlone Stadium, Cape Town
Referee: Aimee Barrett-Theron (South Africa)

4 July
16:30 SAST (UTC+02)

France	26–27	New Zealand
Try: Mousques 5' m Quere-Karaba 50' c Ferté 74' m Con: Reus (1/3) 51'; Pen: Reus (3/3) 22', 39', 66'	Report	Try: Tuivailala 45' c Solomon 53' c Pledger 63' m Letiu 68' m Con: Simpson (2/4) 46', 54'; Pen: Simpson (1/1) 80'

Danie Craven Stadium, Stellenbosch
Referee: Adam Jones (Wales)

9 July
16:30 SAST (UTC+02)

France	29–11	Wales
Try: Bosmorin (2) 8' c, 37' c Lacombre 33' c Castro-Ferreira 44' m Con: Reus (3/4) 9', 34', 38'; Pen: Desperes (1/1) 74'	Report	Try: Morse 71' m Con: Wilde (0/1); Pen: Ford (2/2) 4', 26'

Athlone Stadium, Cape Town
Referee: Neheun Jauri Rivero (Argentina)

9 July
19:00 SAST (UTC+02)

New Zealand	45–13 (Note: The pool match between New Zealand and Spain was abandoned after half-time due to poor weather conditions which rendered the pitch unplayable and unsafe. New Zealand were declared winners of the match.)	Spain
Try: Grant 4' m Smith 8' c Bason (2) 15' c, 37' c Allen 20' c Lolofie 28' m Vaenuku 42' c Con: Hutchinson (5/7) 9', 15', 21', 38', 43'	Report	Try: Ofojetu 24' c Con: Otamendi (1/1) 24'; Pen: Otamendi (2/2) 13', 31'

Danie Craven Stadium, Stellenbosch
Referee: Reuben Keane (Australia)

=== Pool B ===
Pos	Team	Pld	W	D	L	PF	PA	PD	TF	TA	TB	LB	Pts	Qualification
1	Ireland	2	2	0	0	77	31	+46	11	3	1	0	11 (Note: The pool match between Ireland and Australia was cancelled due to weather conditions, rendering the pitch unplayable and unsafe. Each team was awarded two points.)	Advance to Semi-finals
2	Australia	2	1	0	1	47	28	+19	7	3	1	1	8	
3	Georgia	3	1	0	2	55	74	−19	6	10	1	1	6	
4	Italy	3	1	0	2	49	95	−46	6	14	0	0	4	

Updated to match(es) played on 10 July 2024. Source: World Rugby
Notes:

29 June
16:30 SAST (UTC+02)

Ireland	55–15	Italy
Try: Sheahan 3' m L. Murphy 13' c O'Connell 18' c Berman (3) 27' c, 37' m, 47' c Treacy 55' c Naughton 63' c Con: J. Murphy (3/5) 14', 19', 28'; Naughton (3/3) 48', 56', 65'; Pen: Naughton (1/1) 82'	Report	Try: Elettri 6' c Bellucci 43' m Con: Pucciarello (1/2) 7'; Pen: Pucciarello (1/1) 10

DHL Stadium, Cape Town
Referee: Saba Abulashvili (Georgia)

29 June
16:30 SAST (UTC+02)

Australia	35–11	Georgia
Try: Leahy 53' c Ieli 59' c Staniforth (2) 66' m, 81' m McLeod 69' m Con: McLaughlin-Phillips (2/4) 53', 60'; Pen: McLaughlin-Phillips (2/2) 18', 37'	Report	Try: Suluashvili 15' m Pen: Tsirekidze (2/2) 27', 48'

Athlone Stadium, Cape Town
Referee: Aimee Barrett-Theron (South Africa)

4 July
14:00 SAST (UTC+02)

Ireland	22–16	Georgia
Try: Gavin 6' c Smyth 20' m Treacy 83' c Con: Naughton (1/2) 7'; J. Murphy (1/1) 84'; Pen: Naughton (1/1) 57'	Report	Try: Lomidze 45' c Con: Tsirekidze (1/1) 46'; Pen: Tsirekidze (3/5) 36', 41', 62'

Danie Craven Stadium, Stellenbosch
Referee: Reuben Keane (Australia)

4 July
19:00 SAST (UTC+02)

Australia	12–17	Italy
Try: Tuipulotu 46' c Leahy 60' m Con: McLaughlin-Phillips (1/2) 47'	Report	Try: Bellucci 27' c Siciliano 44' c Con: Brisighella (2/2) 28', 45'; Pen: Brisighella (1/1) 81'

Athlone Stadium, Cape Town
Referee: Sam Grove-White (Scotland)

9 July
14:00 SAST (UTC+02)

Ireland	Cancelled (Note: The pool match between Ireland and Australia was cancelled due to weather conditions, rendering the pitch unplayable and unsafe. Each team was awarded two points.)	Australia
	Report

Athlone Stadium, Cape Town
Referee: Morné Ferreira (South Africa)

9 July
16:30 SAST (UTC+02)

Georgia	28–17	Italy
Try: Khakhubia 17' c Penalty try 35'; Khaindrava 62' c Kachlavashvili 69' c Con: Tsirekidze (3/3) 18', 62', 70'	Report	Try: Belloni 13' c Gasperini 67' c Con: Brisighella (2/2) 14', 68'; Pen: Brisighella (1/1) 38'

Danie Craven Stadium, Stellenbosch
Referee: Takehito Namekawa (Japan)

=== Pool C ===
Pos	Team	Pld	W	D	L	PF	PA	PD	TF	TA	TB	LB	Pts	Qualification
1	England	3	3	0	0	105	44	+61	17	6	2	0	14	Advance to Semi-finals
2	Argentina	3	2	0	1	104	64	+40	16	10	2	0	10	
3	South Africa (H)	3	1	0	2	81	55	+26	12	9	1	1	6	
4	Fiji	3	0	0	3	30	157	−127	4	24	0	0	0	

Updated to match(es) played on 10 July 2024. Source: World Rugby
(H) Host

29 June
14:00 SAST (UTC+02)

England	40–21	Argentina
Try: Bracken (3) 35' c, 66' c, 68' c Redshaw 39' c Sela 45' m Pollock 51' c Con: Kerr (5/6) 35', 40', 52', 67', 69'	Report	Try: Podesta 20' c Penoucos 30' c Elías 55' c Con: Di Lucca (2/2) 21', 31'; Rodríguez (1/1) 55'

Athlone Stadium, Cape Town
Referee: Adam Jones (Wales)

29 June
19:00 SAST (UTC+02)

South Africa	57–7	Fiji
Try: Julius (2) 10' c, 36' c Damon 13' c Leotlela 33' c Bakkes 44' c Mahashe 65' c Finca 69' m Moos 75' c Con: Koen (5/5) 10', 14', 34', 37', 45'; Sefoor (2/3) 66', 74'; Pen: Koen (1/1) 22'	Report	Try: Caginavanua 49' c Con: Kikau (1/1) 50'

DHL Stadium, Cape Town
Referee: Neheun Jauri Rivero (Argentina)

4 July
16:30 SAST (UTC+02)

England	48–11	Fiji
Try: Isaacs 7' c Halliwell 14' c Hall (2) 20' m, 38' m Pollock 26' c Cousins (2) 31' m, 76' m James 60' c Con: Coen (4/7) 7', 15', 27', 60'; Bellamy (0/1)	Report	Try: Naivalu 85' m Con: Tuberi (0/1); Pen: Basiyalo (2/2) 4', 36'

Athlone Stadium, Cape Town
Referee: Saba Abulashvili (Georgia)

4 July
19:00 SAST (UTC+02)

South Africa	12–31	Argentina
Try: Penalty try 52'; Hlekani 81' m Con: Koen (0/1)	Report	Try: Greising Revol (2) 4' c, 22' m Bernasconi 8' m Elías 48' c Penoucos 70' c Con: Di Lucca (3/5) 5', 49', 70'

Danie Craven Stadium, Stellenbosch
Referee: Takehito Namekawa (Japan)

9 July
14:00 SAST (UTC+02)

Argentina	52–12	Fiji
Try: Manuel Vivas 4' c Ledesma (2) 9' c, 20' m Greising Revol (2) 44' m, 69' c Podesta 59' c Penalty try 65'; Bernasconi 77' c Con: Rodríguez (5/7) 5', 10', 60', 70', 78'	Report	Try: Tuberi 41' c Nawai 72' m Con: Basiyalo (1/1) 42'; Tuberi (0/1)

Danie Craven Stadium, Stellenbosch
Referee: Sam Grove-White (Scotland)

9 July
19:00 SAST (UTC+02)

South Africa	12–17	England
Try: Porthen 7' c Finca 51' m Con: Koen (1/2) 7'	Report	Try: Carnduff 27' c Bailey 45' m Isaacs 86' m Con: Kerr (1/1) 28'; Coen (0/2)

Athlone Stadium, Cape Town
Referee: Federico Vedovelli (Italy)

=== Seeding ===
Pos	Team	P	W	Diff.	Pts
1	New Zealand (A)	3	3	+40	15
2	England (C)	3	3	+61	14
3	Ireland (B)	2	2	+46	11 (Note: The pool match between Ireland and Australia was cancelled due to weather conditions, rendering the pitch unplayable and unsafe. Each team was awarded two points.)
4	France (A)	3	2	+54	11
5	Argentina (C)	3	2	+40	10
6	Australia (B)	2	1	+19	8
7	Wales (A)	3	1	–4	7
8	South Africa (C)	3	1	+26	6
9	Georgia (B)	3	1	–19	6
10	Italy (B)	3	1	–46	4
11	Spain (A)	3	0	–90	0
12	Fiji (C)	3	0	–127	0

Updated to match(es) played on 9 July 2024. Source: World Rugby

== Knockout stage ==
=== Ninth-place bracket ===
Semi-finals
14 July – Stellenbosch
Italy	28
Spain	15
14 July – Stellenbosch
Georgia	40
Fiji	36

Final
19 July – Athlone (Cape Town)
Italy	13
Georgia	24
Third place
19 July – Athlone (Cape Town)
Spain (a.e.t.)	24
Fiji	19

==== Ninth-place Semi-finals ====
14 July
14:00 SAST (UTC+02)

Italy	28–15	Spain
Try: Milano 8' c Scalabrin 45' m Penalty try 48'; Con: Brisighella (1/2) 8'; Pen: Brisighella (3/3) 66', 74', 80'	Report	Try: Carmona 32' m H. González 50' c Con: Otamendi (1/2) 51'; Pen: Otamendi (1/1) 58'

Danie Craven Stadium, Stellenbosch
Referee: Neheun Jauri Rivero (Argentina)

14 July
16:30 SAST (UTC+02)

Georgia	40–36	Fiji
Try: Khakhubia 25' c Burtikashvili 38' m Gergedava 53' c Lomidze 64' c Keshelava 70' m Con: Tsirekidze (3/5) 26', 54', 65'; Pen: Tsirekidze (3/3) 13', 19', 30'	Report	Try: Tuberi 21' c Nawai (3) 41' m, 59' m, 72' c Salabiau 55' m Niusalelekitoga 67' m Con: Basiyalo (1/2) 22'; Tuberi (2/4) 68', 73'

Danie Craven Stadium, Stellenbosch
Referee: Adam Jones (Wales)

==== Eleventh-place Final ====
19 July
12:00 SAST (UTC+02)

Spain	24–19 (a.e.t.)	Fiji
Try: González Blanco 39' m Zolezzi 56' c Moleti 71' c Gallego 94'; Con: Otamendi (2/4) 56', 72'	Report	Try: Nemani Kurucake 32' c Vakadrigi 36' c Sharma 52' m Con: Basiyalo (2/3) 33', 37'; Pen: Nawai (0/1)

Athlone Stadium, Cape Town
Referee: Federico Vedovelli (Italy)

- Fiji were relegated to the World Rugby U20 Trophy.

==== Ninth-place Final ====
19 July
14:30 SAST (UTC+02)

Italy	13–24	Georgia
Try: Siciliano 69' c Con: Pucciariello (1/1) 70'; Pen: Pucciariello (2/2) 10', 35'	Report	Try: Gergedava 30' m Tsulukidze 44' c Kevkhishvili 60' c Keshelava 67' m Con: Tsirekidze (2/4) 45', 61'

Athlone Stadium, Cape Town
Referee: Aimee Barrett-Theron (South Africa)

=== Fifth-place bracket ===
Semi-finals
14 July – Cape Town
Argentina	34
South Africa	24
14 July – Stellenbosch
Australia	36
Wales	29

Final
19 July – Cape Town
Argentina	14
Australia	6
Third place
20 July – Athlone (Cape Town)
South Africa	47
Wales	31

==== Fifth-place Semi-finals ====
14 July
14:00 SAST (UTC+02)

Argentina	34–24	South Africa
Try: Greising Revol 20' c Elías 25' c Pérez Pardo 39' c Silva 66' c Con: Di Lucca (3/3) 21', 25', 40'; Elizalde (1/1) 67'; Pen: Di Lucca (1/1) 7'; Elizalde (1/1) 73'	Report	Try: Julius (2) 26' c, 77' c Mahashe 44' c Con: Sefoor (2/2) 27', 45' van Niekerk (1/1) 77'; Pen: Sefoor (1/1) 18'

Cape Town Stadium, Cape Town
Referee: Reuben Keane (Australia)

14 July
19:00 SAST (UTC+02)

Australia	36–29	Wales
Try: Cordukes 15' c Pritchard 32' c Saunders 36' c Macpherson 49' m Nelson 64' c Con: McLaughlin-Phillips (4/5) 16', 33', 37', 65'; Pen: McLaughlin-Phillips (1/1) 41'	Report	Try: I. Young 11' m Page (3) 25' c, 68' m, 68' c M. Young 54' m Con: Wilde (1/2) 25'; Ford (1/3) 68'

Danie Craven Stadium, Stellenbosch
Referee: Federico Vedovelli (Italy)

==== Seventh-place Final ====
19 July
14:00 SAST (UTC+02)

South Africa	47–31	Wales
Try: Porthen 8' c Mahashe (2) 20' m, 46' c van Heerden 31' c Hlekani 56' c Moos 64' c Porthen 68' c Con: Sefoor (4/5) 11', 32', 47', 57'; Koen (2/2) 65', 69'	Report	Try: Price (2) 36' m, 73' c Boshoff 49' m S. Emanuel 62' c Conquer 83' c Con: Ford (0/2); Wilde (3/3) 63', 74', 84'

Cape Town Stadium, Cape Town
Referee: Reuben Keane (Australia)

==== Fifth-place Final ====
19 July
17:00 SAST (UTC+02)

Argentina	14–6	Australia
Try: Silva 26' m Con: Di Lucca (0/1); Pen: Di Lucca (3/3) 55', 68', 77'	Report	Pen: McLaughlin-Phillips (2/4) 2', 61'

Athlone Stadium, Cape Town
Referee: Morné Ferreira (South Africa)

=== Finals bracket ===
Semi-finals
14 July – Cape Town
England	31
Ireland	20
14 July – Cape Town
New Zealand	31
France	55

Final
19 July – Cape Town
England	21
France	13
Third place
19 July – Cape Town
Ireland	24
New Zealand	38

==== Semi-finals ====
14 July
16:30 SAST (UTC+02)

England	31–20	Ireland
Try: Wright 25' c Allan 31' c Kerr 42' m Con: Kerr (2/2) 26', 32'; Coen (0/1); Pen: Kerr (4/6) 38', 52', 58', 80'	Report	Try: Coffey 2' c Ward 35' c Con: J. Murphy (2/2) 2', 36'; Pen: J. Murphy (2/2) 30', 39'

Cape Town Stadium, Cape Town
Referee: Morné Ferreira (South Africa)

14 July
19:00 SAST (UTC+02)

New Zealand	31–55	France
Try: Penalty try 8'; Pledger 16' c Maxwell 55' m Tuivailala 59' m A. Smith 67' c Con: Simpson (2/4) 17', 68'	Report	Try: Quere Karaba 4' c Gambini 7' c Castro-Ferreira (3) 14' c, 30' c, 46' c Ferté 64' c Mousques 71' c Con: Reus (7/7) 5', 8', 15', 31', 46', 65', 72'; Pen: Reus (2/2) 19', 33'

Cape Town Stadium, Cape Town
Referee: Sam Grove-White (Scotland)

==== Bronze Final ====
19 July
16:30 SAST (UTC+02)

Ireland	24–38	New Zealand
Try: Coffey 11' c J. Murphy 33' m Graham 77' m Naughton 79' c Con: J. Murphy (2/4) 12', 80'	Report	Try: Bason (2) 38' m, 47' m Taele 45' c Collins 57' c Vaenuku (2) 67' c, 72' c Con: Pledger (0/1); Simpson (4/5) 46', 57', 68', 73'

Cape Town Stadium, Cape Town
Referee: Saba Abulashvili (Georgia)

==== Final ====
19 July
19:00 SAST (UTC+02)

England	21–13	France
Try: Bailey 36' c Green 53' m Con: Kerr (1/2) 36'; Pen: Kerr (3/5) 48', 57', 67'	Report	Try: Ferté 81' c Con: Reus (1/1) 81'; Pen: Reus (2/3) 11', 42'

Cape Town Stadium, Cape Town
Referee: Takehito Namekawa (Japan)

== Statistics ==
As of 19 July 2024.

=== Point scorers ===
Pos.	Player	Points
1	Hugo Reus	57
2	Sean Kerr	44
3	Luka Tsirekidze	42
4	Harry McLaughlin-Phillips	29
5	Santino Di Lucca	28
5	Rico Simpson	28
7	Jack Murphy	27
8	Simone Brisighella	25
8	Juan Greising Revol	25
10	Sean Naughton	24

=== Try scorers ===
Pos.	Player	Tries
1	Juan Greising Revol	5
2	Mathis Castro-Ferreira	4
2	Jurenzo Julius	4
2	Sibabalwe Mahashe	4
2	Aisea Nawai	4
2	Macs Page	4
7	Jack Bracken	3
7	Zach Porthen	3
7	Xavi Taele	3
7	Frank Vaenuku	3

== Final rankings ==
R	Team	Pl	P	W	D	L	PF	PA	Diff.	TF	TA
1	England	C	5	5	0	0	157	77	+80	22	9
2	France	A	5	3	0	2	172	102	+70	22	14
3	New Zealand	A	5	4	0	1	182	152	+30	28	20
4	Ireland	B	4	2	0	2	121	100	+21	17	12
5th–8th playoffs
5	Argentina	C	5	4	0	1	152	94	+58	21	13
6	Australia	B	4	2	0	2	89	71	+18	12	9
7	South Africa	C	5	2	0	3	152	120	+32	22	18
8	Wales	A	5	1	0	4	136	163	–27	20	23
9th–12th playoffs
9	Georgia	B	5	3	0	2	119	123	–4	15	17
10	Italy	B	5	2	0	3	90	134	–44	10	20
11	Spain	A	5	1	0	4	74	172	–98	10	24
12	Fiji	C	5	0	0	5	85	221	–136	13	33

== See also ==
- 2024 World Rugby U20 Trophy
