= Harry Thomas (rugby union) =

Welsh rugby union player

- Born: 14 April 2005 (age 21) Llanelli, Wales
- Height: 185 cm (6 ft 1 in)
- Weight: 108 kg (17 st 0 lb)

Rugby union career
- Position: Hooker
- Current team: Scarlets
Youth career
- New Dock Stars RFC
Senior career
Years	Team	Apps	(Points)
2024–	Scarlets	9	(0)
International career
Years	Team	Apps	(Points)
2024	Wales U20	17	(30)

Harry Thomas (born 14 April 2005) is a Welsh rugby union player who plays at hooker for United Rugby Championship side Scarlets and the Wales national under-20 rugby union team.

== Early life ==
From Llanelli, Thomas grew up a Scarlets fan regularly attending games with his father and grandfather. His father was a captain for New Dock Stars RFC, where he first played youth rugby.

== Club career ==
Starting with the 2023–24 Indigo Group Premiership, Thomas played for Llandovery RFC.

Thomas was first drafted into the Scarlets squad in February 2024, making his debut off the bench in a 7-42 defeat to Munster.

Ahead of the 2024–25 United Rugby Championship season, Thomas captained the Scarlets in a friendly against Carmarthen Quins.

The following season, Thomas was again named as captain for the Scarlets for a friendly against Carmarthen Quins and Llandovery.

Thomas was next selected to start in the opening game of the 2025–26 United Rugby Championship, against Munster. Thomas signed a new contract with the Scarletas ahead of the 2026–27 United Rugby Championship season.

== International career ==
Thomas was selected to represent Wales U20 in the 2024 Six Nations Under 20s Championship, starting 5 of 6 games and ending the tournament with one try. Thomas would also play at the 2024 World Rugby U20 Championship later that year.

Thomas was named as captain for the U20 team, as they played a friendly against the newly-created Welsh Academies U23 team in January 2025.

Thomas' breakthrough game the following year in the 2025 Six Nations Under 20s Championship, scoring 5 tries across the 5 games, helping Wales finish 3rd for the first time since 2017. Thomas would be named Man of the Match in both the second round game against Italy and the final game against England.
