= Kati Tuipulotu =

- Full name: Katilimoni Tuipulotu
- Born: 5 December 1967 (age 58)
- Height: 6 ft 1 in (185 cm)
- Weight: 217 lb (98 kg)
- Notable relative(s): Sione Tuʻipulotu (cousin); Carwyn Tuipulotu (son)

Rugby union career
- Position: Flanker / No. 8
International career
Years	Team	Apps	(Points)
1994–01	Tonga	16	(5)

Katilimoni Tuipulotu (born 5 December 1967) is a Tongan former international rugby union player.

A loose forward, Tuipulotu got capped 16 times by Tonga and featured in two matches at the 1999 Rugby World Cup, which included a win over Italy. He played in Sydney's Shute Shield competition and had several seasons in Wales, with Dunvant, Neath and Ebbw Vale, then moved to Merseyside to play for New Brighton.

Tuipulotu is the father of Wales under-20s representative Carwyn Tuipulotu.

== See also ==
- List of Tonga national rugby union players
