= Kepu Tuipulotu =

English rugby union player

Kepueli Tuipulotu
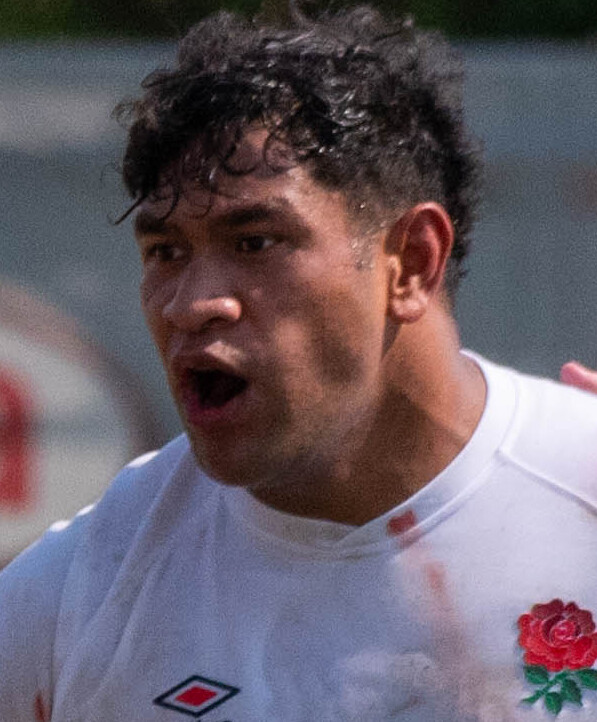
- Born: 2 September 2005 (age 21) Pontypool, Wales
- Height: 1.82 m (6 ft 0 in)
- School: Harrow School
- University: University of Bath
- Notable relative(s): Sione Tuʻipulotu (father); Sisilia Tuipulotu (sister); Carwyn Tuipulotu (cousin)

Rugby union career
- Position: Hooker
Senior career
Years	Team	Apps	(Points)
2024–	Bath	29	(65)
- Correct as of 1 May 2026
International career
Years	Team	Apps	(Points)
2023	England U18	8	(15)
2025	England U20	10	(30)
2025–	England A	2	(5)
- Correct as of 15 November 2025

Kepu Tuipulotu (born 2 September 2005) is a professional rugby union player who plays as a hooker for Premiership Rugby club Bath. Born in Wales, he represented England at youth level qualifying on residency.

== Early life ==
Born in Pontypool, Wales to parents from Tonga, Tuipulotu moved with his family to Plymouth for three years before a stint living in Japan. They subsequently returned to the United Kingdom where they spent seven years in Worcester, England.

Tuipulotu won scholarships to Caldicott School, which he attended between the ages of 11 and 14, and then to Harrow, where he captained the first XV. Tuipulotu was a member of the London Irish academy and in February 2023 they won the under-18 Premiership Rugby title. He made a try scoring debut for the University of Bath playing BUCS Super Rugby in September 2024.

== Club career ==
Tuipulotu joined Bath Rugby for the 2024–25 season. He made his professional debut on 2 November 2024, scoring a hat trick of first half tries in the Premiership Rugby Cup in a 73–0 away win over Ampthill RUFC. He was named among the Bath replacements for their European Rugby Champions Cup match against Benetton Rugby on 15 December 2024. He made his Premiership debut replacing Tom Dunn as Bath lost 35–34 after the clock had gone red against Northampton Saints. In May 2026, he was nominated for Prem breakthrough player of the year.

== International career ==
Tuipulotu chose to represent England who he qualifies for on residency, over Wales, the country of his birth. In April 2023, he made a try-scoring first start playing for England U18, appearing as a hooker in the under-18s Six Nations.

In February 2025, Tuipulotu won man of the match in a 57–13 victory over Scotland U20 during the 2025 U20 Six Nations scoring two tries and assisting another with a grubber kick. He also started in the last round as England were defeated by Wales at Cardiff Arms Park to miss out on a grand slam and ultimately finish runners-up.

In June 2025, Tuipulotu was named in the England U20 squad for the 2025 World Rugby U20 Championship. He captained and scored a Hat-trick of tries during a pool stage game against Australia as England ultimately finished sixth.

Tuipulotu was selected for the England A squad in November 2025 and made his first appearance at that level in a defeat against New Zealand. A week later he scored a try during a victory over Spain.

In May 2026, Tuipulotu was called up to a training camp for the senior England squad by Steve Borthwick, and in October was included in the England squad prior to the start of the 2026 Nations Championship.

== Personal life ==
His sister Sisilia Tuipulotu plays for Gloucester–Hartpury in the Premier 15s, and made her international debut for Wales at the 2022 Women's Six Nations. His father, Sione Tuʻipulotu, played for Tonga, winning 29 caps between 1997 and 2008, and played in Wales for Caerphilly RFC (2001–2003) and the Newport Gwent Dragons (2003–2006), while his cousin Carwyn Tuipulotu plays for French club Pau.
