= Tom Burrow =

English rugby union player

- Born: 27 July 2005 (age 21) Dewsbury, England
- Height: 2.02 m (6 ft 8 in)
- Weight: 117 kg (258 lb; 18 st 6 lb)
- School: Heckmondwike Grammar School
- University: Manchester Metropolitan University

Rugby union career
- Position: Lock
- Current team: Sale Sharks
Senior career
Years	Team	Apps	(Points)
2023–2024	Fylde RFC		
2024–	Sale Sharks	21	(5)
- Correct as of 10 January 2026
International career
Years	Team	Apps	(Points)
2022–2023	England U18	7	(0)
2025	England U20	10	(10)
- Correct as of 19 July 2025

Tom Burrow (born 27 July 2005) is an English professional rugby union footballer who plays as a lock for Premiership Rugby side Sale Sharks.

== Early and personal life ==
From Yorkshire, Burrow started playing rugby at the age of four years-old, encouraged by his father Mark who played rugby for Wakefield, Leeds, Saracens and Morley. He played for Morley Juniors up to under-18 level. He attended Heckmondwike Grammar School.

== Club career ==
Burrow signed a professional contract with Sale Sharks in May 2023. He played for Fylde RFC on a dual registration during the 2023-24 season. He featured for Sale Sharks in the Rugby Premiership and Premiership Rugby Cup during the 2024-25 season.

== International career ==
Burrow played for England U18 in 2022 and 2023. He later captained the England U19 side and in May 2024 was included in the England U20 squad. At the end of that year in November 2024, he was called-up to train with England A.

Burrow scored a try against Scotland during the 2025 Six Nations Under 20s Championship. He also started in the last round of the tournament as England were defeated by Wales at Cardiff Arms Park to miss out on a grand slam and ultimately finish runners-up. Later that year in June 2025, Burrow captained the England side that finished sixth at the 2025 World Rugby U20 Championship.
