= Tom Bowen (rugby union, born 2006) =

Welsh rugby union player (born 2006)

- Born: 7 May 2006 (age 20) Llantrisant, Wales
- Height: 170 cm (5 ft 7 in)
- Weight: 75 kg (165 lb; 11 st 11 lb)
- School: Clifton College
- Notable relative: Gareth Bowen

Rugby union career
- Position(s): Winger; Full-back
- Current team: Cardiff Rugby
Senior career
Years	Team	Apps	(Points)
2024-	Cardiff	24	(75)
- Correct as of 17 July 2026
International career
Years	Team	Apps	(Points)
2025-2026	Wales U20	19	(30)
- Correct as of 17 July 2026

Tom Bowen (born 7 May 2006) is a Welsh professional rugby union football player who plays at winger for Cardiff Rugby.

== Early life ==
Born in Llantrisant, he started playing rugby union as a youngster at Aberdare RFC. He studied Business at A-level with a BTEC in Sport at Clifton College in Bristol.

== Club career ==
He was in the youth academy at Cardiff Rugby prior to joining the academy at Bristol Bears. He rejoined Cardiff in the summer of 2024 on a senior academy contract but training full-time with the senior squad. After scoring seven tries in seven games for Cardiff RFC in the Super Rygbi Cymru at the start of the 2024-25 season, including a hat trick on debut, he was given his EPCR Challenge Cup debut for Cardiff Rugby against Cheetahs on 14 December 2024. He impressed on debut, scoring a try in a 26-10 win.

In the 2025-26 season he took an early lead in the United Rugby Championship scoring charts, scoring a hat trick against Munster and two tries against Connacht, which Cardiff won 14-8. Bowen ended the season by winning the "Fan's Player of the Season", "Try of the Season" and "Breakthrough Player of the Season" in the Cardiff Rugby End of Season Awards. Bowen also won the "URC Next-Gen Player of the Year".

== International career ==
He represented Wales at under-18 level. He represented Wales U20 in the 2025 Six Nations Under 20s Championship and 2025 World Rugby U20 Championship.

Bowen was selected for the 2026 Six Nations Under 20s Championship. He started against England, France, and Scotland.

== Personal life ==
He is the son of Welsh former rugby union player Gareth Bowen.
