= Enoch Opoku-Gyamfi =

Italy international rugby union player

- Born: 2 March 2006 (age 20) Portogruaro, Italy
- Height: 1.96 m (6 ft 5 in)
- Weight: 148 kg (326 lb)
- School: St Paul's Catholic School, Milton Keynes and Milton Keynes Academy
- University: University of Bath

Rugby union career
- Position: Lock
- Current team: Bath
Senior career
Years	Team	Apps	(Points)
2025–	Bath	2	(0)
International career
Years	Team	Apps	(Points)
2025–	Italy U20	10	(0)
2025–	Italy	1	(0)

Enoch Opoku-Gyamfi (born 3 March 2006) is an Italian professional rugby union player who plays as a lock and number 8 for Bath and Italy.

== Early and personal life ==
Opoku-Gyamfi is of Ghanaian descent. His parents moved to Italy after they married and he grew up living in Losson della Battaglia in Veneto. He has two siblings. He started playing rugby union at Rugby San Donà, near Venice. He and his family emigrated across Europe during the COVID-19 pandemic and settled in Milton Keynes, England, when he was in his teenage years. He was educated at St Paul's Catholic School, Milton Keynes where he completed A-levels in engineering and Italian as well as a business B-Tech qualification, before later studying at the University of Bath where he played British Universities and Colleges Sport (BUCS) rugby union, mostly featuring as a Number eight for the side.

== Club career ==
Opoku-Gyamfi played club rugby union in England for Milton Keynes RFC prior to joining the rugby academy at Bath Rugby on a two-year scholarship. In May 2025, he had his contract extended by Bath. He was promoted to the senior academy at Bath prior to the 2025–26 season. He made his first league start in a 33-26 win for Bath at home against Exeter Chiefs on 3 January 2026.

== International career ==
He played for Italy U19 in 2024. He represented the Italy national under-20 rugby union team in the 2025 Six Nations Under 20s Championship. He went on to feature for Italy at the 2025 World Rugby U20 Championship.

In October 2025, he was called up to the senior Italy national rugby union team for the Quilter Nations Series. He made his debut for Italy as a replacement in a 34-19 victory over Chile on 22 November 2025.
