= Sione Tuʻipulotu =

Tonga international rugby union player

Sione Tu'ipulotu
- Born: Sione Mone Tu'ipulotu; 28 November 1976 (age 49) Ha'apai, Tonga
- Height: 1.83 m (6 ft 0 in)
- Weight: 102 kg (16 st 1 lb)

Rugby union career
- Position(s): Scrum-half, Fullback, Centre
Senior career
Years	Team	Apps	(Points)
2003-2006	Newport	26	(10)
2006-2010	Yokogawa Musashino Atlastars	0	(0)
2010-2011	Plymouth Albion R.F.C.	27	(10)
2011-2012	Worcester Warriors	2	(0)
2012	Plymouth Albion R.F.C.	13	(10)
- Correct as of 2 November 2018
International career
Years	Team	Apps	(Points)
1997-2008	Tonga	28	(13)
- Correct as of 22:14, 2 June 2009 (UTC)

Sione Mone Tu'ipulotu (born 28 November 1976 in Ha'apai, Tonga) is a Tongan rugby union footballer. His usual position is at scrum-half, but he can also play as a fullback.

He played in Wales for Caerphilly RFC (2001–2003) and the Newport Gwent Dragons (2003–2006), before moving to Yokogawa in Japan.

Tu'ipulotu made his debut for Tonga against Wales on 16 November 1997, aged only 19. He played at two Rugby World Cup finals, in 1999 and 2007, earning two and four caps at the respective tournaments. He had 27 caps, with two tries and a drop goal scored, 13 points in aggregate, for Tonga, by the end of the competition.

== Personal life ==
His daughter, Sisilia, is also a professional rugby player who plays for Gloucester–Hartpury and the Wales national team, and his nephew Carwyn Tuipulotu plays for the Scarlets. His son Kepu in 2023 played for London Irish academy and England U18s.
