= Sean Kerr =

English rugby union player (born 2004)

- Born: 8 November 2004 (age 22) Johannesburg, Gauteng, South Africa
- Height: 186 cm (6 ft 1 in)
- Weight: 94 kg (207 lb)
- School: Whitgift School

Rugby union career
- Position: Centre
- Current team: Harlequins
Youth career
- –2017: Sutton & Epsom
- 2017–2023: Harlequins Academy
- 2022: Whitgift School
Senior career
Years	Team	Apps	(Points)
2023–	Harlequins	4	(0)
2023	→ Richmond (loan)	7	(50)
2024	→ London Scottish] (loan)	6	(22)
International career
Years	Team	Apps	(Points)
2022	England U17		
2022	England U18	5	
2023	England U19	2	
2024–	England U20	8	(84)
Medal record
Under-20 rugby union
Representing England
World Rugby U20 Championship
Gold medal – first place	2024 South Africa	Team

Sean Kerr (born 8 November 2004) is an English rugby union player who plays for Harlequins in the English Premiership.

== Early life ==
Kerr was born in 2004 in Johannesburg, South Africa. He began playing rugby as a five-year-old at Effingham & Leatherhead RFC in Surrey. He joined Sutton & Epsom RFC in Southwest London before he later joined the Harlequins Academy. Kerr also attended the Whitgift School in South Croydon, London.

== Career ==
=== Harlequins ===
Playing with the Harlequins Academy from at least 2017, Kerr was promoted to the senior team ahead of the 2023–24 season having played for England national youth teams consistently since 2022. After making an appearance at outside centre against Nottingham in the 2023–24 Premiership Rugby Cup in October, he was subsequently loaned out to Richmond in the National League 1 (third tier) between September and November 2023.

== International career ==
=== England youth ===
==== 2022–2023 ====
While at the Harlequins Academy Kerr was a part of England U17, U18 and U19 teams for 2022–2023, and toured South Africa for the U18 International Series in 2022. Kerr played a total of five games for the U18s. Kerr also played two games in 2023 for England U19s against Wales U19s and Italy U18s.

==== 2024 ====
Kerr was named in the England U20s squad ahead of the 2024 U20 Six Nations Championship. He started against first round opponents Italy. Kerr scored the first points of the match and scored seven points in total before being subbed off due to an ankle injury at half-time. England won 11–36 in Treviso. Missing the second round fixture against Wales, Kerr played the remainder of England's Six Nations campaign as starting inside centre and was named “player of the match” against their round three opponents, Scotland. Kerr scored forty points overall for England, including one try. England won the 2024 U20 Six Nations Championship, clinching the title by table point over Ireland.

Following from his performances and status with England, Kerr was again in the England U20 squad for the 2024 U20 Championship in South Africa. Aside from a pool stage fixture against Fiji U20, Kerr started and played every England U20 match, and proved vital in both knockout stage matches, scoring a combined thirty-two points (including one try) in the Semi-finals and Final. England won the 2024 U20 Championship, defeating France U20 21–13.

=== England A ===
In November 2024, he was called-up to the England A national rugby union team. Kerr was selected for the England A squad again in November 2025.
