= St Paul's Catholic School, Milton Keynes =

Voluntary aided school in England

St Paul's Catholic School
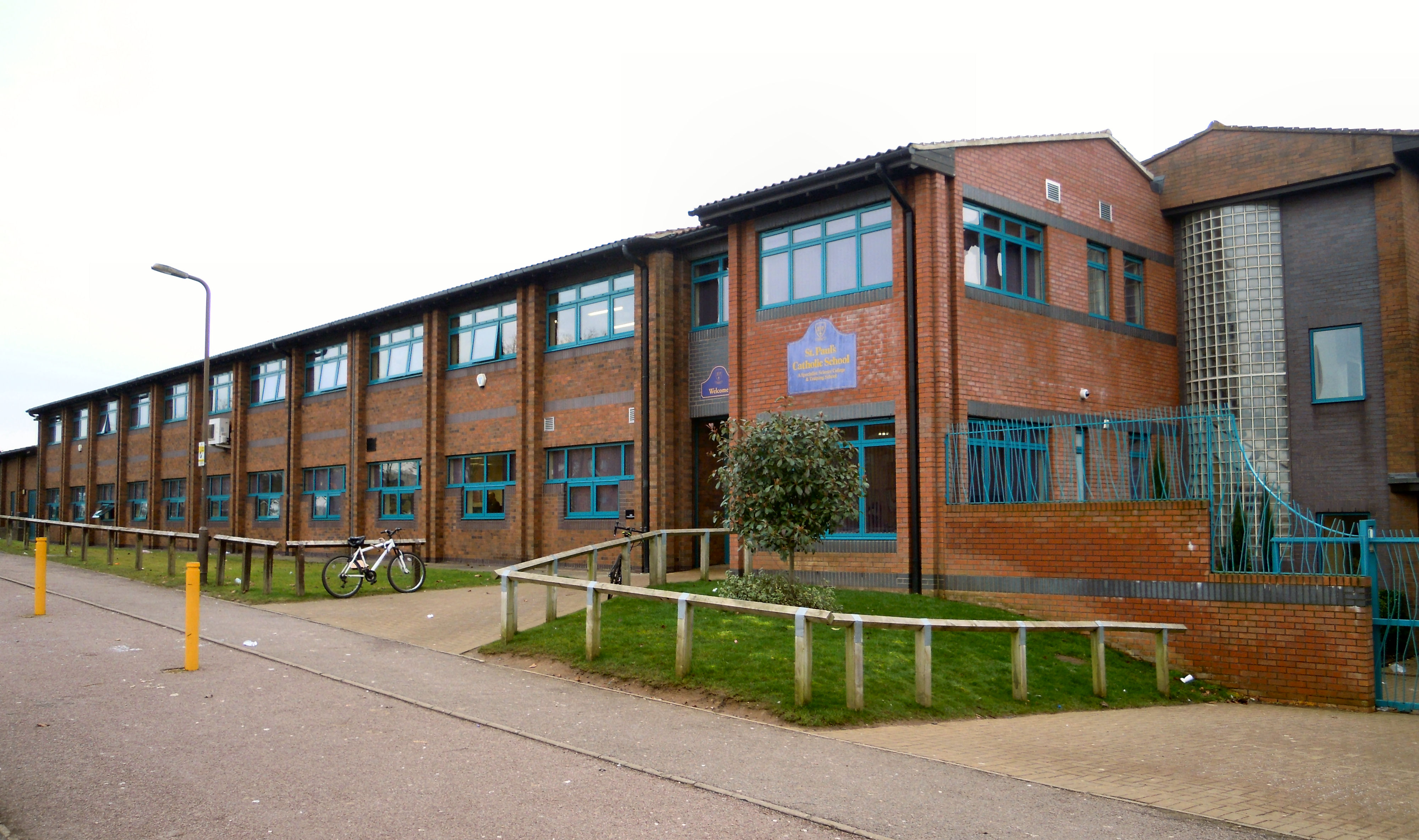
- St Paul's Roman Catholic School

Location
- Phoenix Drive; Milton Keynes, Buckinghamshire, MK6 5EN; England
- Coordinates: 52°01′33″N 0°45′12″W

Information
- Type: Voluntary aided school
- Motto: Ministerium Tuum Imple (Love, Serve and Do the best that is possible)
- Religious affiliation: Roman Catholic
- Established: 1977
- Local authority: Milton Keynes
- Specialists: Science and language
- Department for Education URN: 110517 Tables
- Ofsted: Reports
- Headteacher: Jo-Anne Hoarty
- Gender: Coeducational
- Age: 11 to 19
- Enrolment: 1901
- Colours: Purple and Gold
- Website: http://www.st-pauls.org.uk/

St Paul's Catholic School is a comprehensive co-educational secondary school in Leadenhall, Milton Keynes, England. It has specialist science and language college status and is also a Teacher Training College.

== Ofsted reports ==
The school was inspected again in 2005 and 2008, and in both cases it was judged to be "outstanding".

The school was inspected in late 2013, and was judged as "requires improvement" in every category. The report was quoted as saying: "It is not good because; Students do not make consistently good progress throughout the school, particularly the more able. There is also variation in standards between subjects at GCSE level. Not all teachers have sufficiently high expectations and do not plan lessons which challenge students according to their assessed needs, particularly those that are more able." In a further inspection in March 2016 the school was rated as "good".

== Headteachers ==
- Paul Tubb (1987- 1994)
- Michael Manley (1994 - August 2016) - Previously Deputy Head and RE & Mathematics Teacher
- Jo-Anne Hoarty (Sep 2016 – present) - Previously Deputy Head, Assistant Head and English Teacher

== Notable Former Pupils ==
- Brendan Galloway (Premier League Footballer)
- Kevin Danso (Footballer)
- Enoch Opoku-Gyamfi (rugby union player)
- Andrew Osei-Bonsu (Footballer)
- David Kasumu (Footballer)
- Ruchae Walton (Currently plays NCAA Division 1 Women's College Basketball for Portland State University)
