= Joe Bailey (rugby union) =

English rugby union player (born 2004)

- Born: 6 July 2004 (age 22) Bristol, England
- Height: 198 cm (6 ft 6 in)
- Weight: 110 kg (17 st; 240 lb)
- School: South Dartmoor Community College
- University: University of Exeter

Rugby union career
- Position(s): Lock, Flanker
- Current team: Exeter Chiefs
Senior career
Years	Team	Apps	(Points)
2022–	Exeter Chiefs	8	(0)
- Correct as of 1 February 2025
International career
Years	Team	Apps	(Points)
2022	England U18	3	(0)
2023–2024	England U20	9	(10)
- Correct as of 19 July 2024

Joe Bailey (born 6 July 2004) is an English professional rugby union player who plays as a lock or flanker for Premiership Rugby club Exeter Chiefs.

== Early life ==
Bailey attended South Dartmoor Community College before studying sports science at University of Exeter, where he played for the first XV rugby side.

== Club career ==
Bailey played for Newton Abbot RFC prior to his first call-up to the Exeter Chiefs squad for the Premiership Rugby Cup in September 2022. He made his debut away against Bristol Bears at Ashton Gate. The following season he was also playing number 7 for the Chiefs in that competition.

Bailey spent 2025-26 season playing for Exeter Chiefs in the Prem Cup squad as well as continuing his development playing for Plymouth Albion in National 1 and in the RFU Championship for Cornish Pirates. In February 2026, he signed a new contract with Exeter.

== International career ==
Bailey started for England Under-20 in the last round of the 2024 Six Nations Under 20s Championship as England won at Stade du Hameau to claim the title. Later that year he was a member of their squad at the 2024 World Rugby U20 Championship and scored the opening try of the final as England defeated France at Cape Town Stadium to become junior world champions.

== Honours ==
England U20

- World Rugby Under 20 Championship
  - (gold) Champion (1): 2024
- Six Nations Under 20s Championship
  - (gold) Champion (1): 2024
