= Kane James =

Welsh rugby player (born 2005)

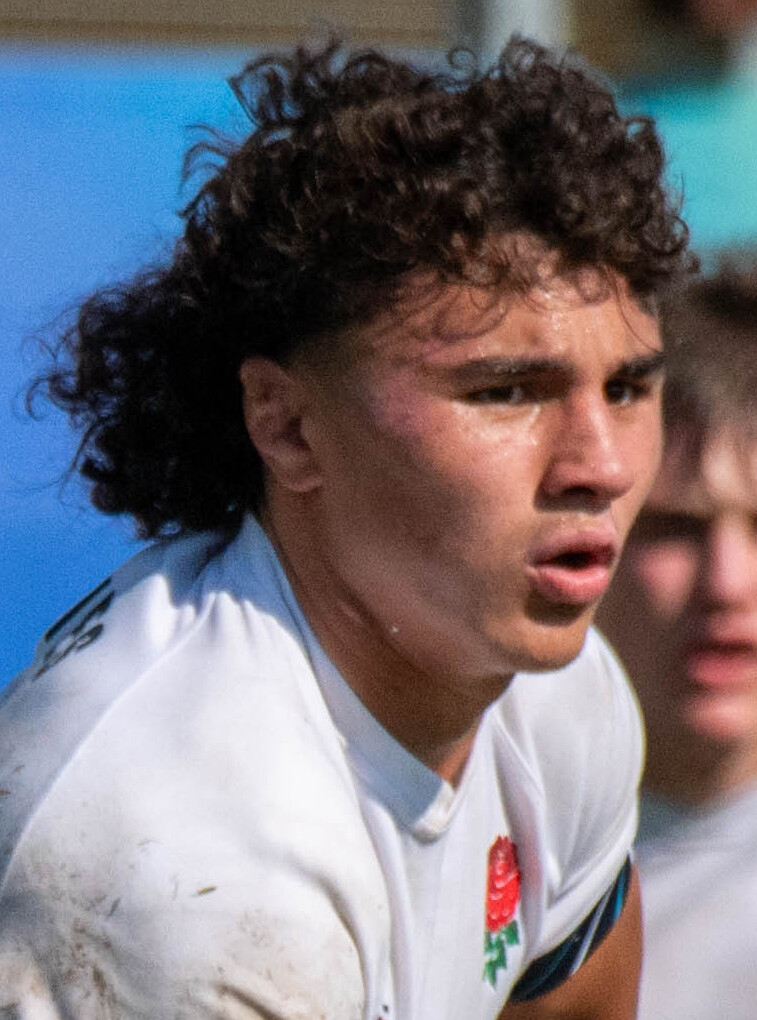
- Born: 26 March 2005 (age 21) Haverfordwest, Wales
- Height: 1.85 m (6 ft 1 in)
- Weight: 98 kg (216 lb; 15 st 6 lb)
- School: Sedbergh School

Rugby union career
- Position: Number 8
- Current team: Exeter Chiefs
Senior career
Years	Team	Apps	(Points)
2024–	Exeter Chiefs	16	(5)
- Correct as of 18 November 2026
International career
Years	Team	Apps	(Points)
2024–2025	England U20	19	(30)
2026–	Wales	1	(0)
- Correct as of 18 November 2026

Kane James (born 26 March 2005) is a Welsh rugby union player who plays in the back row for Exeter Chiefs and the Wales national team.

== Early life ==
Born in Wales, he is from Haverfordwest, he began playing rugby at the age of seven year-old in Cardiff for St Peter's Rugby Club where he played until he was 16 years-old. He received a scholarship to attend Sedbergh School in Cumbria, and part of the Newcastle Falcons academy before moving to Exeter Chiefs.

== Career ==
He represented Wales at under-18 level. He then played for the England U20 side which won the 2024 Six Nations Under 20s Championship and the 2024 World Rugby U20 Championship. He went on to pay for England U20 in the 2025 U20 Six Nations, with his performances including a try in a win over France U20 in Bath on 7 February 2025.

He made his senior debut for Exeter Chiefs on 23 March 2025, in a 52-38 defeat to Bristol Bears in the Rugby Premiership. In June 2025, he was named in the England U20 squad for the 2025 World Rugby U20 Championship.

James confirmed his international allegiance with Wales, and was selected by Steve Tandy for the 2026 Nations Championship. On 11 July, he made his senior international debut as a replacement for Wales against Argentina during the 2026 Nations Championship.

== Personal life ==
He was born in Wales where his father Chris played for Swansea. His mother is from Niue in the Pacific Islands. His sister Crystal plays for Wales.

== Honours ==
England U20

- World Rugby Under 20 Championship
  - (gold) Champion (1): 2024
