= Angus Hall =

English rugby union player

- Born: 17 September 2005 (age 21) Pembury, England
- Height: 1.89 m (6 ft 2 in)
- Weight: 96 kg (15 st 2 lb; 212 lb)
- School: The Judd School

Rugby union career
- Position: Centre
- Current team: Saracens
Senior career
Years	Team	Apps	(Points)
2024–	Saracens	20	(25)
2024–	→Ampthill	11	(30)
- Correct as of 17 June 2026
International career
Years	Team	Apps	(Points)
2023	England U18	5	(15)
2024	England U19	2	(5)
2024–2025	England U20	9	(20)
2025–	England A	2	(0)
- Correct as of 15 November 2025

Angus Hall (born 17 September 2005) is an English professional rugby union player who plays as a centre for Premiership Rugby club Saracens.

== Club career ==
Hall played for Saracens in the summer of 2024 pre-season games, scoring a try against Bedford Blues. He also scored twice for the club in the Premiership Rugby Cup in November 2024 against London Scottish. During the 2024-25 season he also played on loan at Ampthill RUFC in the RFU Championship. He made his Premiership debut for Saracens against Northampton Saints as a replacement on 23 December 2024.

== International career ==
Hall has represented England at under-20 level. He was a member of the England squad at the 2024 World Rugby U20 Championship and scored two tries in a pool game against Fiji. He started in the final as England defeated France at Cape Town Stadium to win the tournament. Later that year in November 2024, Hall was called-up to train with the England A side.

Hall was part of the England side that finished runners up during the 2025 Six Nations Under 20s Championship and scored a try against Scotland. In November 2025, he made his first appearance for England A in a defeat against New Zealand.
