= Frank Vaenuku =

New Zealand rugby union player

- Born: 8 September 2005 (age 21) Auckland, New Zealand
- Height: 1.82 m (6 ft 0 in)
- Weight: 98 kg (216 lb; 15 st 6 lb)
- School: De La Salle College, Auckland

Rugby union career
- Position: Wing
- Current team: Chiefs
Senior career
Years	Team	Apps	(Points)
2024–	Bay of Plenty		
International career
Years	Team	Apps	(Points)
2024-2026	New Zealand Under-20	10	(25)
National sevens team
Years	Team		Comps
2025–	New Zealand		

Frank Vaenuku (born 8 September 2005) is a New Zealand rugby union footballer who plays for Bay of Plenty and Super Rugby club Chiefs. He is a New Zealand rugby sevens international. His preferred position is winger.

== Early life ==
One of seven siblings, Vaenuku started playing rugby union at the age of 15 years-old at De La Salle College in Mangere, South Auckland.

== Career ==
Vaenuku was named in the 2022 Global Youth Sevens Dream Team, and went on to play for Bay of Plenty in the National Provincial Championship.

Vaenuku played for New Zealand U20, scoring five tries in ten matches, and was part of the squads for the 2024 and 2025 World Rugby U20 Championship. His performances with New Zealand U20 earned him the nickname 'Frank the Tank', initially coined by the father of Rico Simpson.

Vaenuku made his debut for the New Zealand national rugby sevens team in the 2024-25 SVNS, making his competitive bow in the 2025 Australia Sevens in Perth. He continued with the team for the 2025-26 SVNS and played as New Zealand won the 2025 Dubai Sevens. He also scored a late extra time try to secure a win over France and a semi-final place at the 2026 Australia Sevens.

Vaenuku joined Super Rugby club Chiefs ahead of the 2027 season.
