= Olamide Sodeke =

English rugby union player (born 2005)

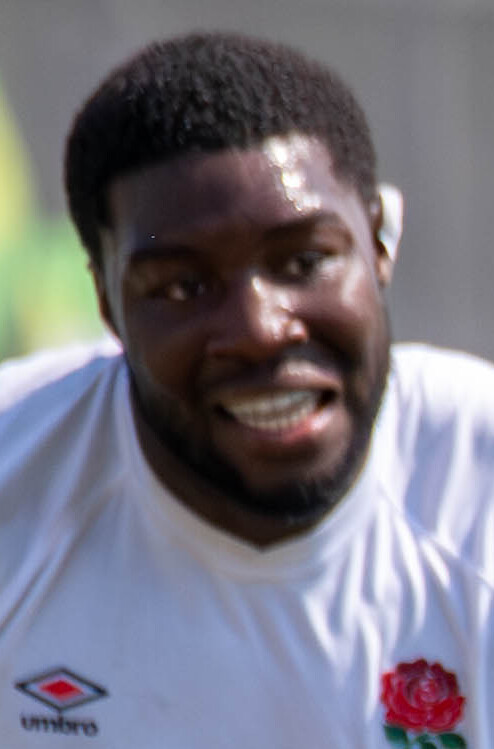
- Born: 26 July 2005 (age 21) London, England
- Height: 2.05 m (6 ft 9 in)
- Weight: 126 kg (19 st 12 lb; 278 lb)
- School: Gravesend Grammar School

Rugby union career
- Position(s): Lock, Flanker
- Current team: Saracens
Senior career
Years	Team	Apps	(Points)
2024–	Saracens	11	(0)
2024–	→ Ampthill (loan)	16	(5)
- Correct as of 3 January 2026
International career
Years	Team	Apps	(Points)
2022–2023	England U18	6	(0)
2024–2025	England U20	19	(0)
2025–	England A	1	(0)
- Correct as of 15 November 2025

Olamide Sodeke (born 26 July 2005) is an English professional rugby union player who plays as a second row forward for Premiership Rugby club Saracens.

== Early life ==
His father Adewale and mother Mobola moved from Nigeria. He was born in North London at the Whittington Hospital while his sister was later born at Queen Elizabeth Hospital in South East London . His father works for the NHS and his mother is a housing officer. A Formula One and football fan as a child, he only began playing rugby at school when he was aged 11 years-old. He later joined Blackheath, before joining the academy at Saracens.

== Club career ==
Sodeke played on-loan for RFU Championship side Ampthill RUFC in 2024. He was included in the Saracens match-day squad for the first time, named as a replacement for the Premiership Rugby match against Bristol Bears on 4 January 2025, and made his debut as a late replacement for Tom Willis.

== International career ==
Sodeke played for England Under-17 and in 2023 toured South Africa with England Under-18.

Sodeke was part of the England U20 side which won the 2024 Six Nations Under 20s Championship. He was included in the squad for the 2024 World Rugby U20 Championship and played in the final as England defeated France at Cape Town Stadium to become youth world champions.

In June 2025, Sodeke was named in the England squad for the 2025 World Rugby U20 Championship and featured in all of their games as England ultimately finished sixth. Later that year in November 2025 he made his first appearance for England A in a victory against Spain.

== Personal life ==
Sodeke attended Gravesend Grammar School where he was head boy, prior to reading economics and business management at King's College London.

== Honours ==
England U20

- World Rugby Under 20 Championship
  - Champion (1): 2024
- Six Nations Under 20s Championship
  - Champion (1): 2024
