= Charlie Bracken =

English rugby union player

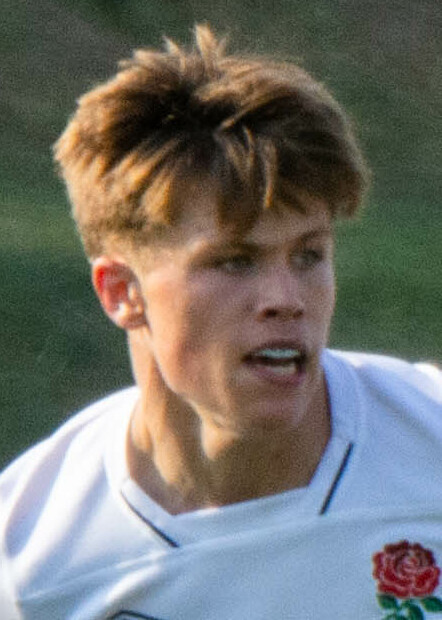
- Bracken in 2022
- Born: 9 December 2003 (age 22) Westminster, England
- Height: 1.78 m (5 ft 10 in)
- Weight: 81 kg (12.8 st; 179 lb)
- School: St. Albans School
- University: Loughborough University
- Notable relative(s): Kyran Bracken (father); Jack Bracken (brother)

Rugby union career
- Position: Scrum-half
Amateur team(s)
Years	Team	Apps	(Points)
- Barnet Rugby Club
Senior career
Years	Team	Apps	(Points)
2022–	Saracens		
2023–2025	→ Ampthill (loan)		
- Correct as of 5 April 2024
International career
Years	Team	Apps	(Points)
2022	England U18	1	(5)
2022–2023	England U20	14	(5)
- Correct as of 14 July 2023

Charlie Bracken (born 9 December 2003) is an English professional rugby union footballer who plays at scrum-half for Saracens and has played for the England under-20 team. He is the son of former England scrum-half Kyran Bracken.

== Career ==
=== Club ===
Bracken chose Barnet Elizabethans Rugby Club as his first club. He joined Saracens aged fourteen, and progressed through the age groups and made his senior debut in the Premiership Rugby Cup against Wasps RFC in March 2022. Bracken progresses to the senior academy at Saracens, occasionally playing first team games. He started a Premiership Rugby Cup alongside his brother Jack against Leicester Tigers in September 2025, the first time they had started a professional match together. By the end of the 2025-26 season, he had made over 50 appearances for Saracens, having also spent some time on loan at RFU Championship club Ampthill.

=== International ===
In February 2022, Bracken was called up to a England under-18 training camp held in Bisham Abbey. The following month saw him score a try against Wales under-18 at Taunton.

In the summer of 2022, Bracken made four appearances for the England U20 team. He was included in the squad for the 2023 Six Nations Under 20s Championship and footage of Bracken giving away his shirt to a young fan at the conclusion of the opening round clash between England and Scotland was reported as going viral. Later that year, he was a member of the side that finished fourth at the 2023 World Rugby U20 Championship and scored his only try of the tournament in a pool stage draw with Australia.

In June 2025, Bracken was called up to a training camp for the senior England squad by Steve Borthwick. He was called-up to train with the England squad again in September 2026 as an illness replacement for Archie McParland.

== Personal life ==
The son of former England rugby Union international Kyran Bracken and his wife Victoria, Charlie has two younger brothers Jack and Lachlan. They were brought up in Hadley Wood. He completed his A-levels at St. Albans School and then attended Loughborough University.
