= Tye Raymont =

English rugby union player (born 2005)

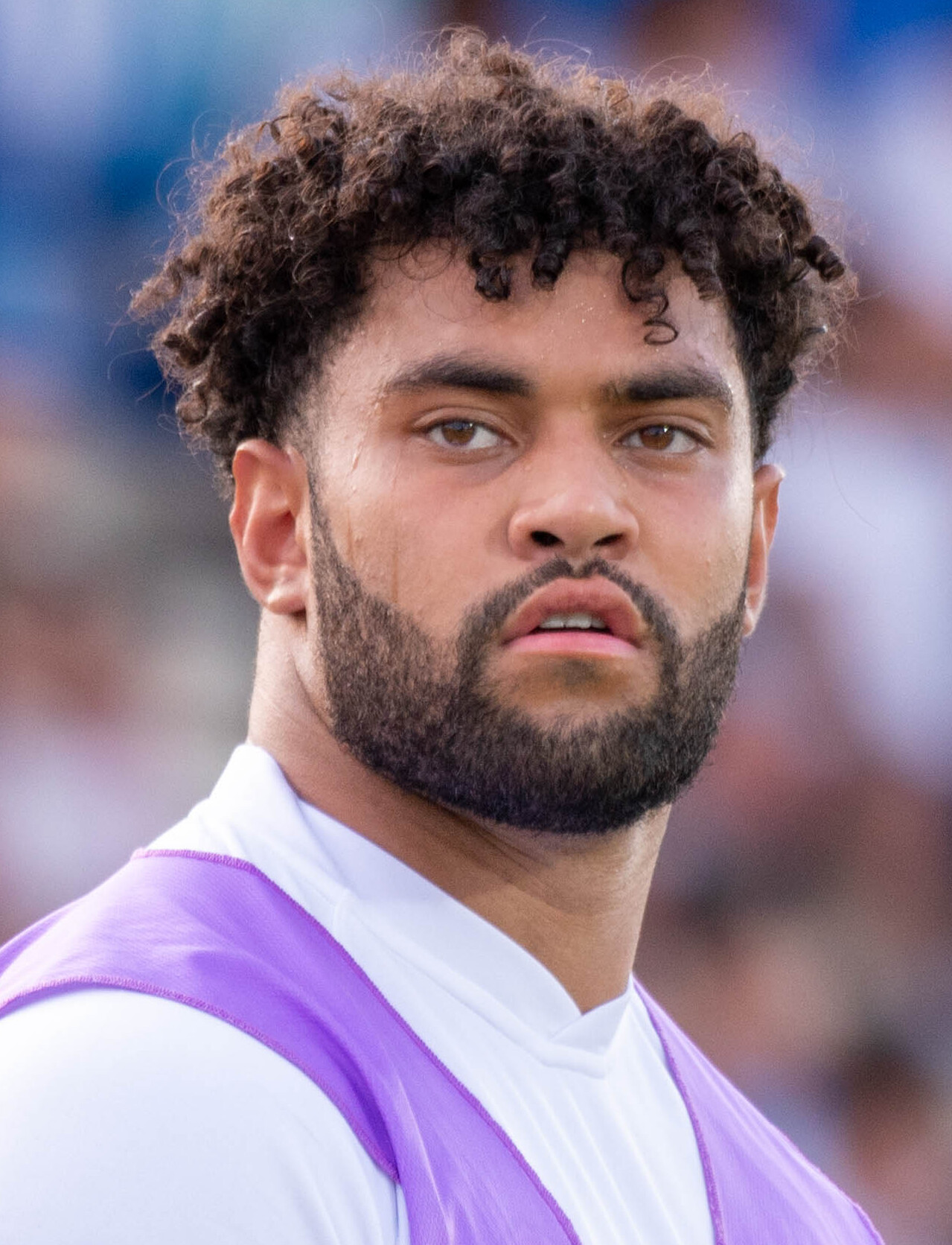
- Raymont at the 2025 World Rugby U20 Championship
- Born: 19 July 2005 (age 21) Leeds, England
- Height: 185 cm (6 ft 1 in)
- Weight: 115 kg (18 st 2 lb)
- School: Bishop Burton College

Rugby union career
- Position: Tighthead Prop
- Current team: Sale Sharks
Senior career
Years	Team	Apps	(Points)
2023–	Sale Sharks	4	(0)
2023–2024	→ Fylde (loan)	19	(0)
- Correct as of 10 May 2025
International career
Years	Team	Apps	(Points)
2023	England U18	5	(0)
2025	England U20	8	(5)
- Correct as of 19 July 2025

Tye Raymont (born 19 July 2005) is an English professional rugby union footballer who plays for Premiership Rugby club Sale Sharks as a prop forward.

== Club career ==
Born in Leeds, Raymont played 19 of Fylde RFC's 26 matches in National League 2 North during the 2023-24 season.

He made his Premiership Rugby debut for Sale Sharks against Bath Rugby on 28 January 2025.

== International career ==
Raymont represented England at Under-17s, 18s and 19s level and in 2025 became an England U20 international. On 21 February 2025, he scored a try for England U20 against Scotland U20 in the U20 Six Nations. He also started in the last round as England were defeated by Wales at Cardiff Arms Park to miss out on a grand slam and ultimately finish runners-up. Later that year in June 2025, Raymont was part of the England U20 squad that finished sixth at the 2025 World Rugby U20 Championship.

== Personal life ==
He attended Bishop Burton College in the East Riding of Yorkshire.
