= Edoardo Todaro =

Italy international rugby union player (born 1999)

- Born: 24 September 2006 (age 20) Milan, Italy
- Height: 1.80 m (5 ft 11 in)
- Weight: 88 kg (194 lb; 13 st 12 lb)
- School: Ipswich School

Rugby union career
- Position: Winger
- Current team: Northampton Saints
Youth career
- Northampton Saints
Senior career
| Years | Team | Apps | (Points) |
| 2025– | Northampton Saints | 12 | (45) |
- Correct as of 19 January 2026
International career
| Years | Team | Apps | (Points) |
| 2025– | Italy U20 | 10 | (29) |
| 2025– | Italy | 1 | (0) |
- Correct as of 27 Nov 2025

Edoardo Todaro (born 24 September 2006) is an Italian professional rugby union player who plays as a winger for Premiership Rugby club Northampton Saints and Italy.

== Early life ==
Todaro was born to Sylvia and Gianluigi in Milan, Italy, before attending Ipswich School in England on an academic and sports scholarship from the age of 14 years-old. His father had also played rugby union when he was younger and Todaro began to favour the sport over football. He made his debut for the Ipswich School first-XV playing at fly-half.

== Club career ==
Todaro featured for Northampton at under-18 level. He was given an academy contract with the senior Northampton Saints team ahead of the 2025-26 season. He had a try-scoring debut for Northampton in the Rugby Premiership in September 2025 against Exeter Chiefs, scoring twice in a 33-33 draw. He made it three tries in three matches with another score in a 32-26 win over Leicester Tigers on 11 October, featuring on both wings during the match. Later that season, his performances included a first-half hat trick of tries in the European Rugby Champions Cup in a 43-28 win against Scarlets. In May 2026, he was nominated for Prem breakthrough player of the year.

== International career ==
He was a member of the Italy U20 team that played in the 2025 Six Nations Under 20s Championship and featured in all Italy's matches, fulfilling a variety of positions; including at inside centre, outside centre and full-back. He subsequently played for the side at the 2025 World Rugby U20 Championship, his efforts including a try in a victory against Ireland U20.

In October 2025, Todaro was called-up to the senior Italy national rugby union team for the Autumn Nations Series. He made his debut for Italy as a replacement in a 34-19 victory over Chile on 22 November 2025. He retained his place in the Italy squad for the 2026 Six Nations Championship, however, at an Italian training camp pre-championship he tore his cruciate knee ligament.
