= Jack Bracken (rugby union) =

English rugby union player (born 2005)

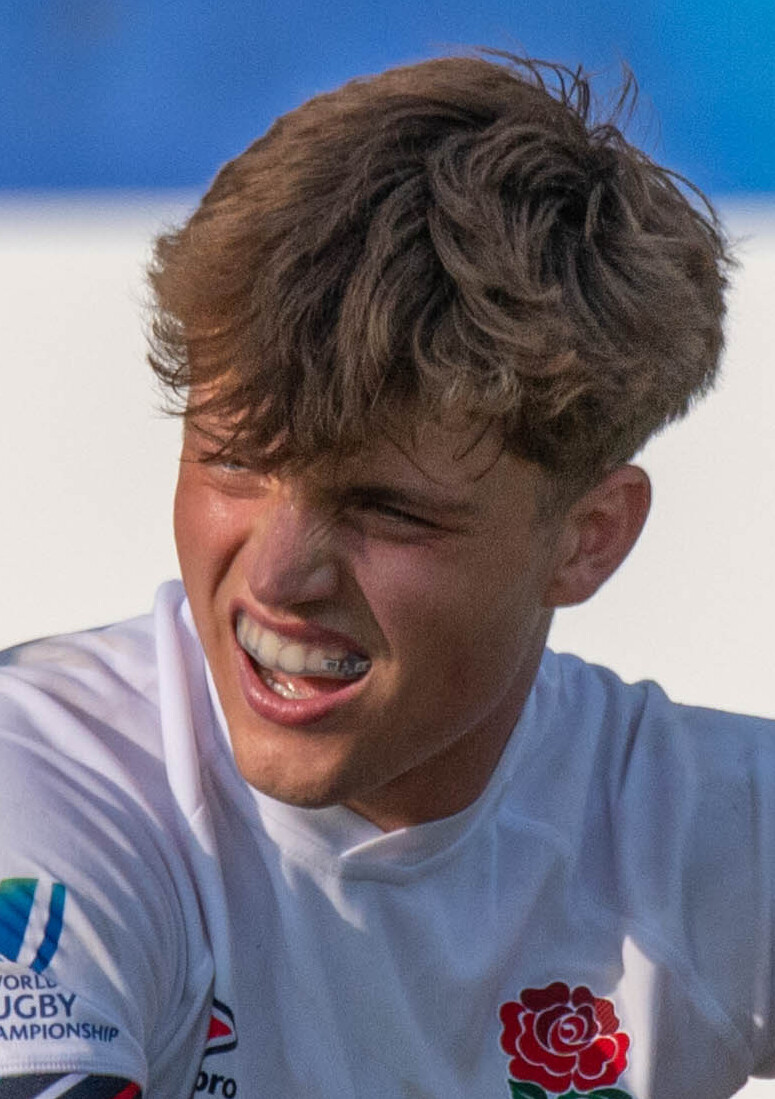
- Born: 15 October 2005 (age 21)
- Height: 1.83 m (6 ft 0 in)
- Weight: 89 kg (196 lb; 14 st 0 lb)
- Notable relative(s): Kyran Bracken (father); Charlie Bracken (brother)

Rugby union career
- Position: Wing
- Current team: Saracens
Senior career
Years	Team	Apps	(Points)
2024–	Saracens	10	(45)
2024–	Ampthill RUFC	6	(35)
- Correct as of 16 November 2025
International career
Years	Team	Apps	(Points)
2023	England U18	7	(10)
2024–2025	England U20	13	(50)
- Correct as of 19 July 2025

Jack Bracken (born 15 October 2005) is an English professional rugby union footballer who plays as a winger for Saracens and has played for the England under-20 team. He is the son of former England scrum-half Kyran Bracken.

== Early life ==
Bracken started playing rugby in his back garden with his brothers and later started playing for St Albans RFC.

== Club career ==
A product of the academy at Saracens, Bracken is capable of playing full-back or wing. He scored his first try for Saracens in the Premiership Rugby Cup in 2024. He also played on loan for Ampthill RUFC in the RFU Championship during the 2024-25 season.

On 4 October 2025, he scored two tries on his Premiership Rugby debut for Saracens in a 50-17 victory over Bristol Bears.

== International career ==
Bracken was an England U18 international in 2023. The following year he scored a Hat-trick of tries on his England U20 debut playing as a winger against Argentina U20 during their opening game of the 2024 World Rugby U20 Championship in July 2024. Bracken also played in the final as England defeated France at Cape Town Stadium to win the tournament.

Bracken was part of the England side that finished runners up during the 2025 Six Nations Under 20s Championship and scored in victories over Scotland and Italy. In June 2025, he was a member of the England squad at the 2025 World Rugby U20 Championship. He scored tries against South Africa, Australia and Wales as England ultimately finished sixth.

== Personal life ==
The son of former England rugby union international Kyran Bracken and his wife Victoria, he has two brothers Charlie and Lachlan. They were brought up in Hadley Wood.

== Honours ==
England U20

- World Rugby Under 20 Championship
  - (gold) Champion (1): 2024
