= Ralph McEachran =

English rugby union player (born 2005)

- Born: 19 July 2005 (age 21)
- Height: 190 cm (6 ft 3 in)
- Weight: 115 kg (18 st 2 lb)
- School: The Bishop Wand Church of England School

Rugby union career
- Position: Loosehead Prop
- Current team: Sale Sharks
Youth career
- 2019–2023: London Irish
Senior career
Years	Team	Apps	(Points)
2023–	Sale Sharks	4	(0)
2023–2024	→ Lymm (loan)	19	(5)
2024–2025	→ Coventry (loan)	4	(0)
- Correct as of 3 January 2026
International career
Years	Team	Apps	(Points)
2023	England U18	4	(0)
2025	England U20	10	(5)
- Correct as of 19 July 2025

Ralph McEachran (born 30 May 2005) is an English professional rugby union footballer who plays for Rugby Premiership club Sale Sharks as a prop forward.

== Club career ==
McEachran started playing rugby union at Guildford Rugby Club, prior to joining London Irish at the age of 14 years-old. He joined Sale Sharks in 2023 after London Irish ceased operations.

He played for Lymm RFC in National League 2 North on loan from Sale. He made his debut for Sale in the Premiership Rugby Cup during the 2024–25 season. That season, he also played on loan in the RFU Championship for Coventry R.F.C..

== International career ==
In 2023 McEachran represented England U18. He is an England U20 international, making his debut during the Six Nations U20 Championship in February 2025. He scored a try in the last round of the tournament as England were defeated by Wales at Cardiff Arms Park to miss out on a grand slam and ultimately finish runners-up. Later that year in June 2025, McEachran started every game for the England side that finished sixth at the 2025 World Rugby U20 Championship.

== Personal life ==
He attended The Bishop Wand Church of England School in Sunbury-on-Thames, Surrey.
