= Deian Gwynne =

Welsh rugby union player (born 2006)

- Born: 2 February 2006 (age 20) Aberystwyth
- Height: 1.90 m (6 ft 3 in)
- Weight: 106 kg (16 st 10 lb; 234 lb)

Rugby union career
- Position: Flanker
- Current team: Gloucester
Youth career
- 2023-2024: Scarlets
Senior career
Years	Team	Apps	(Points)
2024–	Gloucester	25	(15)
International career
Years	Team	Apps	(Points)
2025-	Wales U20	16	(5)

Deian Gwynne (born 2 February 2006) is a Welsh professional rugby union rugby player who plays as a back row forward for Premiership Rugby side Gloucester and Wales U20.

== Early life ==
From Aberystwyth, he was educated at Ysgol Penllwyn Primary School and then moved to Ysgol Penweddig. He played junior rugby for Clwb Rygbi Aberystwyth from Under-7s through to the Under-16s.

== Club career ==
He was a member of the Scarlets Rugby Academy in Wales, with whom he won the Regional Age Grade competition. He joined the Gloucester Rugby Senior Academy in May 2024.

Described as an "exciting" prospect by Gloucester director of rugby George Skivington, he made his professional debut for Gloucester in the Premiership Rugby Cup in 2024 as an 18 year-old, before going on to make further senior appearances during the 2024-25 season.

== International career ==
He featured for Wales U18 prior to playing for Wales U20 in the 2025 Six Nations U20 Championship, making his debut against France U20 in January 2025. He featured for Wales at the 2025 World Rugby U20 Championship.

Gwynne was named as co-captain alongside Steffan Emanuel for the 2026 Six Nations Under 20s Championship. He started against England, France, and Scotland. Gwyne was awarded player of the match for his performance in the win against Scotland.
