= Harry Beddall =

Welsh rugby union player

- Born: 23 January 2005 (age 21) Cardiff, Wales
- Height: 1.78 m (5 ft 10 in)
- Weight: 94 kg (207 lb; 14 st 11 lb)
- University: Hartpury University

Rugby union career
- Position: Flanker
- Current team: Dragons
Senior career
Years	Team	Apps	(Points)
2024–2025	Leicester	1	(0)
2024–	Dragons	12	(0)
International career
Years	Team	Apps	(Points)
2024–2025	Wales U20	16	(5)

Harry Beddall (born 23 January 2005) is Welsh professional rugby union footballer who plays as a flanker for Dragons RFC.

== Club career ==
Born in Cardiff, he attended Cardiff High School and played for St Peter’s RFC and Hartpury RFC.

A flanker, he joined the academy of Leicester Tigers in England and made his senior Leicester debut against Coventry RFC in the Premiership Rugby Cup in November 2024.

He returned to Wales signing with Dragons RFC in 2025. Initially intended to be eased in via Super Rygbi Cymru with Ebbw Vale, Beddall had become a regular starter within the first six months of his debut season for Dragons, registering high in league tackles despite missing the first few rounds of matches.

== International career ==
Beddall captained the Wales national under-20 rugby union team in the 2025 U20 Six Nations, where he led the championship in tackles, and to the 2025 World Rugby U20 Championship.
