= Ieuan Davies =

Welsh rugby union player (born 2004)

- Born: 15 October 2004 (age 22)
- Height: 1.75 m (5 ft 9 in)
- Weight: 80 kg (12 st 8 lb; 176 lb)
- School: Millfield

Rugby union career
- Position: Scrum-half
- Current team: Bath
Senior career
Years	Team	Apps	(Points)
2023–	Bath	6	(0)
2025–2026	→ Cardiff (loan)	3	(0)
International career
Years	Team	Apps	(Points)
2024–2025	Wales U20	8	(10)

Ieuan Davies (born 15 October 2004) is a professional rugby union footballer who plays as a scrum-half for Bath.

== Club career ==
From Swansea, Davies started his playing rugby union at South Gower RFC. He was educated at Millfield in Somerset, England. In 2023, he signed a senior academy contract with Bath Rugby.

He made his Bath debut in the Premiership Rugby Cup against Ampthill on 8 February 2025. In May 2025, he had his contract extended by Bath.

Davies signed with Cardiff Rugby on loan for the 2025-26 season. He made his debut for Cardiff in the 2025–26 EPCR Challenge Cup away against Stade Français Paris on 6 December 2025.

== International career ==
Dual-qualified, he was selected to play for England U18, but a Welsh-speaker, he expressed his desire to play for Wales and represented the Wales national under-20 rugby union team in the 2024 U20 Six Nations Championships.
