= Sam Scott (rugby union) =

Welsh rugby union player (born 2005)

- Full name: Sam Scott
- Born: 2 December 2005 (age 20) Church Village, Wales
- Height: 185 cm (6 ft 1 in)
- Weight: 118 kg (260 lb; 18 st 8 lb)
- School: Bryn Celynnog Comprehensive School
- University: City of Oxford College

Rugby union career
- Position: Prop
- Current team: Bristol Bears
Youth career
- -2022: Llantwit Fardre RFC
- 2023-2024: Midlands Academy
Senior career
Years	Team	Apps	(Points)
2024–	Bristol Bears	5	(0)
International career
Years	Team	Apps	(Points)
2021–2023	Wales U18		
2023–	Wales U20	20	(0)

Sam Scott (born 2 December 2005) is a Welsh rugby union player who plays for the Bristol Bears Academy and Wales U20 as a Tighthead Prop.

== Club career ==
Scott began his career at Llantwit Fardre RFC, moving to the Midlands Academy (formerly Wasps Academy) whilst studying Sport Science at City of Oxford College. He joined the Bristol Bears Academy in April 2024.

== International career ==
Sam played for the Wales under-18 side, before being selected for the Wales under-20 side in 2023 having only just turned 18.

On 21 February 2025, Scott was awarded player of the match for his performance in the win over Ireland U20
