= Billy Bohan =

Irish rugby union player (born 2005)

- Born: 22 November 2005 (age 20)
- Height: 1.91 m (6 ft 3 in)
- Weight: 114 kg (251 lb)
- School: Newbridge College
- Notable relative: Mick Doyle (grandfather)

Rugby union career
- Position: Prop
- Current team: Connacht
Senior career
Years	Team	Apps	(Points)
2025-	Connacht	7	(0)
International career
Years	Team	Apps	(Points)
2025	Ireland U20		
2026	Ireland A	1	(0)
2026-	Ireland	1	(0)
- Correct as of 11 July 2026

Billy Bohan (born 22 November 2005) is an Irish international rugby union footballer who plays for Connacht Rugby and the Ireland national team. His preferred position is prop.

== Early and personal life ==
From County Kildare, he is grandson of former Ireland player and coach Mick Doyle. Bohan attended Newbridge College. He started playing minis rugby at Newbridge RFC in Rosetown before featuring for Newbridge College from the under-13s, and featuring in the Leinster Schools Senior Cup.

== Club career ==
A product of the Connacht Rugby Academy, and a specialised prop, Bohan made his senior debut for Connacht against the Georgian club Black Lion in the European Challenge Cup in 2025.

== International career ==
In 2025, Bohan was part of the Ireland U-20 team, making an appearance as a replacement for the opening U20 Six Nations game before starting the next consecutive matches. He also featured for Ireland at the 2025 World Rugby U20 Championship.

In January 2026, Bohan was called up to the Irish Wolfhounds before being moved to the senior Ireland national rugby union team later that month as an injury replacement for Jack Boyle ahead of the 2026 Six Nations Championship. He made his senior international debut from the bench against Japan in the 2026 Nations Championship Southern Hemisphere Series.
