= Aki Tuivailala =

New Zealand rugby union player

- Full name: Giancarlo Angelito Tuivailala
- Born: 24 September 2004 (age 22) New Zealand
- Height: 186 cm (6 ft 1 in)
- Weight: 98 kg (216 lb; 15 st 6 lb)
- School: Hamilton Boys' High School

Rugby union career
- Position: Centre / Wing
- Current team: Yamaha Blue Revs, Waikato
Senior career
Years	Team	Apps	(Points)
2023–	Waikato	12	(15)
2025–2026	Crusaders	0	(0)
2026–	Yamaha Blue Revs		
- Correct as of 10 December 2024
International career
Years	Team	Apps	(Points)
2023–2024	New Zealand U20	11	(10)
- Correct as of 10 December 2024

Aki Tuivailala (born 24 September 2004) is a New Zealand rugby union player, who plays for the Crusaders in Super Rugby and Waikato in the NPC. His preferred position is centre or wing.

== Early career ==
Tuivailala attended Hamilton Boys' High School where he co-captained the side in the World Schools Festival Cup and represented the 1st XV on 50 occasions. He represented NZ U20 in both 2023 and 2024, and was a member of the Chiefs academy representing them at U20 level.

== Professional career ==
Tuivailala has represented Waikato in the National Provincial Championship since 2023, being named as a replacement player for the 2024 Bunnings NPC. He was named in the Crusaders squad for the 2025 Super Rugby Pacific season in November 2024.
