= Mark Mapletoft =

England international rugby union player

- Born: Mark Sterland Mapletoft; 25 December 1971 (age 54) Mansfield, Nottinghamshire, England
- Height: 5.7 ft (1.7 m)
- Weight: 13 st (83 kg)
- School: Lawrence Sheriff for Boys (Rugby)
- University: Loughborough University

Rugby union career
- Position(s): Fly-half, Fullback
Senior career
Years	Team	Apps	(Points)
1990–1994	Rugby Lions		
1994–1999	Gloucester Rugby		(461)
1999–2002	Harlequins		
2002–2005	London Irish		(453)
–	Loughborough Students		
International career
Years	Team	Apps	(Points)
1997	England	1	(3)
- Correct as of 2014-06-20

Mark Mapletoft (born 25 December 1971) is an English rugby union coach and former player. He played for England in one test against Argentina in 1997, having also represented England at A, U21 and U18 levels. He was also a reserve for the Coventry football team.

== Early life ==
Mark Mapletoft was born on 25 December 1971 in Mansfield.

== Rugby union career ==
Mapletoft joined Gloucester in 1994 from Rugby Lions as a full-back but made the move to fly-half under coach Richard Hill after recovering from a serious knee injury. He made his only international appearance on 7 June 1997 at Ferrocaril Oeste, Buenos Aires in the Argentina vs England match. Argentina won the match 33 to 13. He scored 11 tries for Gloucester and scored over 450 points. Many of the top clubs wanted his signature and his desire to play at number 10, when Gloucester saw him reverting to full back lead to a move to Harlequins. He ended his playing days at London Irish.

He was overlooked at an international level because Rob Andrew was the mainstay of the England side and the emergence of Johnny Wilkinson meant he was unable to secure a place at the highest level. He scored 6 tries and scored over 450 points for Irish before retiring and taking a role with the RFU Academy. While coaching at Saracens, he played amateur rugby for Hertford RFC.
