= Sisilia Tuipulotu =

Wales international rugby union player

- Born: 14 August 2003 (age 23) Newport, Wales
- Height: 175 cm (5 ft 9 in)
- Weight: 113 kg (249 lb; 17 st 11 lb)

Rugby union career
- Position: Prop
Senior career
Years	Team	Apps	(Points)
	Gloucester-Hartpury		(0)
International career
Years	Team	Apps	(Points)
2022–Present	Wales	31	(35)

Sisilia Tuipulotu (born 14 August 2003) is a Welsh rugby union player. She plays prop for Wales internationally and for Gloucester-Hartpury in the Premier 15s competition.

== Early life and career ==
Tuipulotu's father, Sione Tuʻipulotu, played for Tonga, winning 29 caps between 1997 and 2008, and played in Wales for Caerphilly RFC (2001–2003) and the Newport Gwent Dragons (2003–2006), while her cousin Carwyn Tuipulotu plays for the Scarlets.

Tuipulotu is studying at University of Gloucestershire. She played netball, but changed to rugby.

== Rugby career ==
Tuipulotu plays for Gloucester-Hartpury. She replaced winger, Lisa Neumann, to make her test debut for Wales against Ireland at the 2022 Six Nations Championship.

Tuipulotu also competed at the 2023 Women's Six Nations Championship. On 25 March, she was named "player of the match" against Ireland.

On 11 August 2025, she was named in the Welsh squad to the Women's Rugby World Cup in England.
