= Billy Sela =

English rugby union player

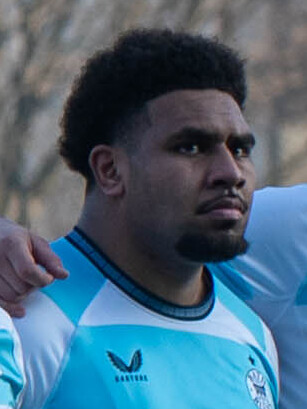
- Sela in 2024
- Born: Vilikesa Sela; 12 April 2005 (age 21) Hounslow, England
- Height: 1.92 m (6 ft 4 in)
- Weight: 116 kg (18 st 4 lb; 256 lb)
- School: Beechen Cliff School
- University: University of Bath

Rugby union career
- Position: Prop
- Current team: Bath
Amateur team(s)
Years	Team	Apps	(Points)
2016–2020	Royal Wooton Bassett		
Senior career
Years	Team	Apps	(Points)
2024–	Bath	19	(10)
- Correct as of 1 May 2026
International career
Years	Team	Apps	(Points)
2022–2023	England U18	11	(15)
2024–2025	England U20	15	(10)
2025–	England A	2	(0)
- Correct as of 15 November 2025

Vilikesa "Billy" Sela (born 12 April 2005) is an English professional rugby union player who plays as a prop forward for Premiership Rugby club Bath Rugby.

== Early life ==
Sela was born in Hounslow, and is one of four children of Fijian descent. His father Ilaitia served in the infantry and the Royal Logistics Corps in the British Army before becoming a petroleum operator for the Ministry of Defence and the family moved to Wiltshire. His father also played rugby union for the Army, including featuring at Twickenham. Sela attended Beechen Cliff School in Bath, Somerset. Having first played rugby at Royal Wootton Bassett, he joined Bath Rugby Academy at 15 years-old. He later attended the University of Bath.

== Club career ==
Sela was part of the senior academy intake for Bath Rugby ahead of the 2023–24 season. He featured for the Bath first team in pre-season friendly matches ahead of the 2024–25 season with the Bath coaching staff confirming he was part of their first team plans. He was named amongst the match day substitutes for Bath's Premiership Rugby match on 29 September 2024 against Leicester Tigers, making his senior debut as a second-half replacement. He was named in the Bath starting XV for his European Rugby Champions Cup debut against Benetton Rugby on 15 December 2024.

== International career ==
Sela was a member of the England under-18 side that toured South Africa in both 2022 and 2023.

Sela was part of the England under-20 team that won the 2024 Six Nations Under 20s Championship starting in every round. He also played at the 2024 World Rugby U20 Championship however Sela was injured during the tournament and missed the final which England won to become youth world champions. At the end of that year in November 2024, he was called-up to train with the England A squad.

In June 2025, Sela played for England at the 2025 World Rugby U20 Championship and scored a try in their last game of the tournament which they lost against Australia to ultimately finish sixth. Later that year in November 2025 he made his first appearance for England A in a defeat against New Zealand.

In January 2026, he was called up to England's senior training squad ahead of the 2026 Six Nations Championship after injuries to tighthead props Will Stuart and Asher Opoku-Fordjour.

== Honours ==
England U20

- World Rugby U20 Championship
  - (gold) Champion (1): 2024
- Six Nations Under 20s Championship
  - (gold) Champion (1): 2024
