= Carwyn Tuipulotu =

Welsh rugby union player

- Born: 28 September 2001 (age 25) Abergavenny, Wales
- Height: 1.88 m (6 ft 2 in)
- Weight: 120 kg (19 st; 260 lb)
- School: Sedbergh School
- University: Swansea University
- Notable relative(s): Taulupe Faletau (cousin); Billy Vunipola (cousin); Mako Vunipola (cousin); Kepu Tuipulotu (cousin); Sisilia Tuipulotu (cousin)

Rugby union career
- Position: Number 8
Senior career
Years	Team	Apps	(Points)
2021–2025	Scarlets	28	(15)
2022–2023	Llanelli RFC	2	(0)
2024–2025	Carmarthen Quins	6	(0)
2025	→ Saracens	2	(5)
2025–2026	Pau	14	(20)
2026–	Exeter Chiefs		
- Correct as of 12 October 2026
International career
Years	Team	Apps	(Points)
2021	Wales U20	4	(0)
- Correct as of 11 February 2025

Carwyn Tuipulotu (born 28 September 2001) is a Welsh professional rugby union player, who most recently played for Top 14 side Section Paloise as a Number 8.

== Club career ==
=== Youth rugby ===
Tuipulotu was part of the Newcastle Falcons academy, and was part of the Welsh Exiles, leading to a contract with the Scarlets academy.

=== Scarlets ===
Tuipulotu was named in the Scarlets first-team squad for the 2020–21 Pro14 season. He was first called into the Scarlets matchday squad for a pre-season friendly against their rivals, the Ospreys, on 25 September 2020. He made his debut in the rearranged Round 8 match of the 2020–21 Pro14 against Leinster. Tuipulotu signed his first professional contract with the Scarlets in February 2021, tying him to the region for the next four years.

On 26 March 2022, Tuipulotu scored his first try for the Scarlets, in a 41–24 win over Zebre. He scored another try in a friendly against the Saracens on 10 March 2023.

Tuipulotu played for Llanelli RFC until the side was disbanded, and later featured for Carmarthen Quins RFC in Super Rygbi Cymru.

=== Saracens ===
On 24 January 2025, Tuipulotu joined Saracens as short term injury cover. He made his debut on 1 February 2025 in a Premiership Rugby Cup fixture against Ealing Trailfinders, scoring a try in the loss.

=== Section Paloise ===
On 10 February 2025, Tuipulotu returned from his short-term loan with Saracens and joined Top 14 side Section Paloise initially on an injury cover basis with immediate effect.

Tuipulotu departed the side at the end of the 2025–26 season.

=== Exeter Chiefs ===
Tuipulotu trained with the Dragons during the 2026–27 preseason, but did not sign a contract with them. He joined Exeter Chiefs on 6 October 2026 for the remainder of the season. He scored a try on his debut in the Premiership Rugby Cup. Tuipulotu scored a hat-trick of tries on 21 November in the Premiership Rugby Cup.

== International career ==
=== Wales U20 ===
Previously involved with Wales U16 and U18, Tuipulotu represented Wales U20 in the 2021 Six Nations Under 20s Championship.

== Personal life ==
Tuipulotu is the son of former Tonga international Kati Tuipulotu, who earned 16 caps between 1994 and 2001, and played in Wales for Ebbw Vale RFC, Dunvant RFC and Neath RFC during his career. Tuipulotu is also a cousin of England internationals Mako and Billy Vunipola, Wales international number 8 Taulupe Faletau and Wales Women’s international Sisilia Tuipulotu.

The family moved to England in 2005, as Kati worked as a player-coach for New Brighton RFC. While in England, Tuipulotu attended Sedbergh School. Tuipulotu studied philosophy at Swansea University.

He is in a relationship with Irish rugby player Leah Tarpey.
