= Harri Wilde =

Welsh rugby union player

- Born: 15 May 2005 (age 21) Pontypridd, Wales
- Height: 180 cm (5 ft 11 in)
- Weight: 87 kg (192 lb; 13 st 10 lb)
- School: Ysgol Gyfun Gymraeg Glantaf
- University: Cardiff Metropolitan University

Rugby union career
- Position: Fly-half
- Current team: Ospreys (on loan from Cardiff)
Senior career
Years	Team	Apps	(Points)
2025–	Cardiff	2	(4)
2026–	→ Ospreys (loan)	1	(0)
- Correct as of 26 September 2026
International career
Years	Team	Apps	(Points)
2023–2025	Wales U20	22	(71)
- Correct as of 26 September 2026

Harri Wilde (born 15 May 2005) is a Welsh rugby union player, who plays for the Ospreys, on loan from Cardiff, in the United Rugby Championship. His preferred position is fly-half.

== Early career ==
Wilde was born in Pontypridd and grew up in Llantwit Fardre. A former Pontypridd Schools player, he attended Ysgol Gyfun Gymraeg Glantaf after joining the Cardiff academy. He plays his club rugby for Cardiff RFC, while also studying at Cardiff Metropolitan University. Wilde represented the Wales U20 side in 2023, 2024, and 2025.

== Professional career ==
Wilde debuted for Cardiff in the 2025–26 United Rugby Championship, coming on as a replacement against Zebre Parma in November 2025. He would make a further appearance against Stade Français Paris the following week. At the end of the season, he would sign a new contract with Cardiff, before joining the Ospreys on loan for the 2025–26 United Rugby Championship season. He made his debut for the Ospreys in the opening match of the season, coming on as a replacement against the Sharks.
