= Simone Brisighella =

Italian rugby union player (born 2004)

- Born: 19 July 2004 (age 22) Parma, Italy
- Height: 1.86 m (6 ft 1 in)
- Weight: 85 kg (13 st 5 lb; 187 lb)

Rugby union career
- Position: Fly-half / Fullback
- Current team: Valorugby Emilia
Youth career
- 2022–2023: Viadana
- 2023: Zebre Parma
Senior career
Years	Team	Apps	(Points)
2023–2025	Zebre Parma	1	(0)
2023–2025	→Viadana		
2025–	Valorugby Emilia		
- Correct as of 20 September 24
International career
Years	Team	Apps	(Points)
2023–2024	Italy U20	13	(65)
2026	Italy XV	2	(11)
- Correct as of 20 September 24
National sevens team
Years	Team		Comps
2026−	Italy Sevens		2

Simone Brisighella (born 19 July 2004) is an Italian rugby union player. His usual position is as a Fly-half or Fullback and he currently plays for Valorugby Emilia in Italian Serie A Elite.

Brisighella signed for Zebre Parma in March 2023 ahead of the 2023–24 United Rugby Championship as Academy Player. He made his debut in Round 10 of the 2024–25 season against the Ulster. From 2023 to summer 2025 he played also for Viadana in Italian Serie A Elite as Academy Player.

In 2023 and 2024 he was named in Italy U20s squad. for annual Six Nations Under 20s Championship.

On 3 December 2024 he was called in Italy Under 23 squad for test series against Emerging Scotland. On 28 January 2026 he was selected by Massimo Brunello to be part of an Italy XV squad for two official tests against Scotland A and Chile during 2026 men's rugby union internationals window of spring.
