= Aisea Nawai =

Fijian rugby union player

- Born: 10 April 2005 (age 21) Fiji
- Height: 178 cm (5 ft 10 in)
- School: Marist Brothers High School

Rugby union career
- Position: Wing
- Current team: Drua
Senior career
Years	Team	Apps	(Points)
2026–	Drua		
- Correct as of 8 November 2025
International career
Years	Team	Apps	(Points)
2024	Fiji U20	5	(20)
- Correct as of 8 November 2025
National sevens team
Years	Team		Comps
2025	Fiji		1
- Correct as of 8 November 2025

Aisea Nawai (born 10 April 2005) is a Fijian rugby union player, who plays for the Drua. His preferred position is wing.

== Early career ==
Nawai attended Marist Brothers High School where he was head boy and played rugby. He plays his Skipper Cup rugby for Nadi. In 2024, he represented Fiji U20 where he played both Scrum-half and his more natural wing position.

== Professional career ==
Nawai has been a member of the Drua development side in 2025, before being promoted to the full squad for the 2026 Super Rugby Pacific season. While a member of the Drua development squad, he made his debut for the Fiji Sevens side at the 2025 USA Sevens.
