= Steffan Emanuel =

Welsh rugby union player

- Born: 1 July 2006 (age 20) Llantrisant, Wales
- Height: 1.83 m (6 ft 0 in)
- Weight: 95 kg (15.0 st; 209 lb)
- School: Millfield

Rugby union career
- Position: Centre
Senior career
Years	Team	Apps	(Points)
2024–	Cardiff Rugby	12	(5)
International career
Years	Team	Apps	(Points)
2024–	Wales U20	21	(52)

Steffan Emanuel (born 1 July 2006) is a Welsh rugby union player who plays as a centre for Cardiff Rugby and the Wales national under-20 rugby union team.

== Club career ==
On 6 December 2024, Emanuel was selected for the European Challenge Cup game against Lyon.

== International career ==
At the age of 17, Emanuel was selected in the Wales U20 squad for the World Rugby Championship in South Africa. He would make his debut as a replacement against New Zealand, scoring a try in a narrow defeat.

Emanuel was selected again by Wales U20, for the 2025 Six Nations Under 20s Championship, and also named as vice-captain.

== Personal life ==
His brother Ioan Emanuel is also a professional rugby union player.
