= Aidan Boshoff =

Welsh rugby union player (born 2005)

- Born: 28 September 2005 (age 21) Abergavenny, Wales
- Height: 1.85 m (6 ft 1 in)
- Weight: 92 kg (203 lb; 14 st 7 lb)
- School: Clifton College

Rugby union career
- Position: Winger
- Current team: Bristol Bears
Senior career
Years	Team	Apps	(Points)
2023–	Bristol Bears	11	(30)
International career
Years	Team	Apps	(Points)
2024–2025	Wales U20	15	(15)

Aidan Boshoff (born 28 September 2005) is a Welsh professional rugby union footballer who plays as a winger for Bristol Bears.

== Early life ==
From Wales, he was born in Abergavenny before living in Cape Town for eleven years. After returning to Wales, he attended Monmouth Boys School and played age-group rugby union for Pontypool and then Dragons U16s, before attending Clifton College in Bristol.

== Club career ==
He made his professional debut for Bristol Bears as a 17 year-old in the Premiership Rugby Cup in September 2023, starting against Exeter Chiefs. At 17 years and 346 days, he became the sixth youngest player to play a competitive match for the club. Boshoff signed his first professional contract in April 2024.

In November 2024, he was a try scorer in the Premiership Rugby Cup for Bristol against Bath. The following season, he was a try scorer in the Prem against Northampton Saints.. In December 2025, he scored his first try in the European Rugby Champions Cup, on his first start in the competition. Boshoff signed an extension on 24 February 2026.

== International career ==
He played for Wales U18 prior to making his debut for the Wales national under-20 rugby union team in March 2024. He featured for Wales U20 in the U20 Six Nations Championship in 2024 and 2025. Boshoff featured for Wales U20 in a fixture against a Welsh Academies U23 team. He was selected for the Wales U20 squad to compete at the 2025 World Rugby U20 Championship.
