= 2025–26 Premiership Rugby =

Season in English rugby union

- Countries: England
- Number of teams: 10
- Date: 25 September 2025 – 20 June 2026
- Champions: Northampton Saints (3rd title)
- Runners-up: Exeter Chiefs
- Matches played: 93
- Attendance: 1,373,562 (average 14,769 per match)
- Highest attendance: 81,126
- Tries scored: 803 (average 8.6 per match)
- Top point scorer: Henry Slade, Exeter (193)
- Top try scorer: Noah Caluori, Saracens (18); Tommy Freeman, Northampton (18)

Official website
- www.premiershiprugby.com

The 2025–26 Premiership Rugby season was the 39th season of the top flight English domestic rugby union competition. The competition was broadcast by TNT Sports for the thirteenth consecutive year and the second year of their current broadcast deal.

The reigning champions entering the season were Bath, who claimed their seventh league title after winning the 2025 final. No team was promoted from the 2024–25 RFU Championship, as the champions, Ealing Trailfinders, were not able to satisfy the eligibility criteria required to enter the league.

== Teams ==
The competition featured the same 10 teams from the 2024–25 season, including Newcastle Falcons, who played under their new name of Newcastle Red Bulls for the first time, after the club was taken over by Red Bull. For the fourth consecutive season, the top team in the Championship was ineligible for promotion to the Premiership, after 2024–25 Championship winners Ealing Trailfinders failed to meet the minimum standards criteria to join the competition.

=== Stadiums and locations ===
2025-26 Gallagher Premiership Teams

Club	Director of Rugby / Head Coach	Captain	Stadium	Capacity	City/Area
Bath	(South Africa) Johann van Graan	(England) Ben Spencer	The Recreation Ground	14,509	Bath, Somerset
Bristol Bears	(Samoa) Pat Lam	(England) Fitz Harding	Ashton Gate (Note: Bristol Bears will also play one home game at Principality Stadium, Cardiff.)	27,000	Bristol
Exeter Chiefs	(England) Rob Baxter	(England) Jack Yeandle	Sandy Park	15,600	Exeter, Devon
Gloucester	(England) George Skivington (Note: George Skivington was the director of rugby at Gloucester until March 2026, when Chris Boyd was appointed as consultant technical director. Skivington then moved into the role of head coach, reporting directly to Boyd.)	(Wales) Tomos Williams	Kingsholm (Note: Gloucester will also play one home game at Villa Park, Birmingham.)	16,115	Gloucester, Gloucestershire
Harlequins	(Australia) Jason Gilmore	(England) Alex Dombrandt	Twickenham Stoop (Note: Harlequins will also play two home games at Twickenham Stadium, London.)	14,800	Twickenham, Greater London
Leicester Tigers	(England) Geoff Parling	(England) Ollie Chessum	Welford Road	25,849	Leicester, Leicestershire
Newcastle Red Bulls	(Wales) Stephen Jones (Note: Steve Diamond began the season as director of rugby at Newcastle Red Bulls, before he was relieved of his duties on 1 October 2025. He was replaced as head coach by Alan Dickens. On 16 March 2026, Dickens departed the club by mutual consent, and assistant Stephen Jones took the role of interim head coach for the remainder of the season.)	(England) George McGuigan	Kingston Park	10,200	Newcastle upon Tyne, Tyne and Wear
Northampton Saints	(England) Phil Dowson	(England) George Furbank	Franklin's Gardens	15,249	Northampton, Northamptonshire
Sale Sharks	(England) Alex Sanderson	(South Africa) Ernst van Rhyn	CorpAcq Stadium	12,000	Salford, Greater Manchester
Saracens	(Ireland) Mark McCall	(England) Maro Itoje	StoneX Stadium (Note: Saracens will also play one home game at Tottenham Hotspur Stadium, London.)	10,500	Hendon, Greater London

== Table ==
Pos	Team	Pld	W	D	L	PF	PA	PD	TF	TA	TB	LB	Pts	Qualification
1	Northampton Saints (C)	18	14	1	3	693	536	+157	104	77	15	1	74	Champions Cup and play-offs
2	Bath (SF)	18	13	0	5	646	424	+222	98	60	14	3	69	Champions Cup and play-offs
3	Exeter Chiefs (RU)	18	11	1	6	521	367	+154	72	51	14	5	65	Champions Cup and play-offs
4	Leicester Tigers (SF)	18	12	0	6	583	405	+178	82	56	12	3	63	Champions Cup and play-offs
5	Saracens	18	10	0	8	628	449	+179	92	64	13	4	57	Champions Cup
6	Bristol Bears	18	11	0	7	525	509	+16	76	74	9	1	54	Champions Cup
7	Sale Sharks	18	5	0	13	524	602	−78	75	90	10	6	36	Champions Cup
8	Gloucester	18	5	0	13	424	576	−152	64	81	8	4	32	Champions Cup
9	Harlequins	18	6	0	12	448	589	−141	64	90	6	1	31	Challenge Cup
10	Newcastle Red Bulls	18	2	0	16	325	860	−535	47	131	3	1	12	Challenge Cup

Updated to match(es) played on 6 June 2026. Source: Premiership Rugby
Rules for classification: Tiebreakers for teams tied on points: 1) Number of matches won; 2) Difference between points for and against; 3) Total number of points for; 4) Aggregate number of points scored in matches between tied teams; 5) Number of matches won excluding the first match, then the second and so on until the tie is settled.

=== Round-by-round progression ===
The grid below shows each team's progression throughout the season, indicating their points total (and league table position) at the end of every round:

Team Progression
Team	R1	R2	R3	R4	R5	R6	R7	R8	R9	R10	R11	R12	R13	R14	R15	R16	R17	R18
Northampton Saints	3 (5th)	8 (4th)	13 (2nd)	18 (1st)	23 (1st)	23 (3rd)	28 (3rd)	33 (1st)	38 (1st)	43 (1st)	48 (1st)	52 (1st)	57 (1st)	62 (1st)	62 (1st)	67 (1st)	72 (1st)	74 (1st)
Bath	5 (4th)	10 (2nd)	15 (1st)	16 (3rd)	21 (2nd)	26 (1st)	31 (1st)	31 (3rd)	36 (2nd)	41 (2nd)	46 (2nd)	51 (2nd)	56 (2nd)	58 (2nd)	58 (2nd)	63 (2nd)	64 (2nd)	69 (2nd)
Exeter Chiefs	3 (5th)	8 (3rd)	9 (6th)	14 (5th)	19 (3rd)	23 (2nd)	28 (2nd)	32 (2nd)	34 (3rd)	35 (3rd)	40 (4th)	45 (4th)	47 (4th)	49 (4th)	54 (4th)	55 (4th)	60 (4th)	65 (3rd)
Leicester Tigers	1 (8th)	6 (5th)	7 (7th)	11 (6th)	16 (5th)	21 (4th)	26 (4th)	26 (5th)	31 (5th)	36 (4th)	41 (3rd)	46 (3rd)	51 (3rd)	52 (3rd)	57 (3rd)	62 (3rd)	62 (3rd)	63 (4th)
Saracens	5 (1st)	10 (1st)	11 (3rd)	16 (2nd)	17 (4th)	19 (6th)	21 (6th)	26 (6th)	27 (6th)	32 (6th)	32 (6th)	33 (6th)	38 (6th)	42 (6th)	47 (6th)	52 (5th)	57 (5th)	57 (5th)
Bristol Bears	5 (2nd)	5 (7th)	9 (5th)	14 (4th)	14 (6th)	19 (5th)	24 (5th)	29 (4th)	33 (4th)	37 (3rd)	37 (5th)	38 (5th)	43 (5th)	48 (5th)	49 (5th)	50 (6th)	54 (6th)	54 (6th)
Sale Sharks	5 (3rd)	5 (6th)	10 (4th)	10 (7th)	12 (7th)	13 (7th)	13 (7th)	18 (7th)	19 (7th)	20 (7th)	20 (7th)	22 (7th)	22 (7th)	27 (7th)	28 (7th)	29 (7th)	31 (7th)	36 (7th)
Gloucester	0 (9th)	2 (8th)	2 (9th)	3 (9th)	3 (9th)	8 (9th)	8 (9th)	8 (9th)	9 (9th)	11 (8th)	16 (8th)	16 (8th)	16 (8th)	21 (8th)	25 (8th)	25 (9th)	27 (8th)	32 (8th)
Harlequins	1 (7th)	1 (9th)	5 (8th)	5 (8th)	10 (8th)	10 (8th)	10 (8th)	10 (8th)	10 (8th)	10 (9th)	11 (9th)	15 (9th)	15 (9th)	16 (9th)	21 (9th)	26 (8th)	26 (9th)	31 (9th)
Newcastle Red Bulls	0 (10th)	0 (10th)	0 (10th)	0 (10th)	0 (10th)	0 (10th)	0 (10th)	1 (10th)	5 (10th)	5 (10th)	7 (10th)	7 (10th)	7 (10th)	7 (10th)	7 (10th)	7 (10th)	12 (10th)	12 (10th)
Updated: 6 June 2026

Key
Win	Draw	Loss

== Regular season ==
The regular season fixtures were announced on 23 July 2025. The opening match of the season between Gloucester and Sale Sharks took place on a Thursday night – a first for the league. The change was made as there will be no Saturday match, in order to avoid a clash with the 2025 Women's Rugby World Cup third-place play-off and final at Twickenham on 27 September 2025.

Highlights of the season include:

- Derby Weekends – All fixtures scheduled for Round 3 are derby matches between local rivals – the Northern Derby (Sale Sharks v Newcastle Red Bulls), the West Country Derbies (Bristol Bears v Exeter Chiefs and Gloucester v Bath), the East Midlands Derby (Northampton Saints v Leicester Tigers), and the London Derby (Harlequins v Saracens).
- Slater Cup – Leicester Tigers and Gloucester will contest the Slater Cup at Welford Road on 19 December 2025, and at Villa Park on 28 March 2026, in honour of former Leicester and Gloucester player Ed Slater.
- Big Game 17 – Harlequins will host Bristol Bears in this season's edition of The Big Game at Twickenham Stadium on 28 December 2025, during Round 7.
- The Showdown 6 – Saracens will host Northampton Saints in this season's edition of The Showdown at Tottenham Hotspur Stadium on 28 March 2026, during Round 12.
- Big Summer Kick-Off 5 – Harlequins will host Exeter Chiefs in this season's edition of the Big Summer Kick-Off at Twickenham Stadium in May 2026, during Round 16.
- Big Day Out – Bristol Bears will host Harlequins in the second edition of the Big Day Out at Principality Stadium in March 2026, during Round 12.

Notes

- All fixtures are subject to change.
- Referees appointed to officiate Premiership matches are employed by the RFU, unless indicated otherwise.

=== Results ===
Home \ Away	BAT	BRI	EXE	GLO	HAR	LEI	NEW	NOR	SAL	SAR
Bath	—	40–15	33–26	38–17	48–15	24–22	69–12	21–41	28–16	62–15
Bristol Bears	21–19	—	18–14	53–12	14–18	42–24	36–27	46–12	19–17	26–41
Exeter Chiefs	35–12	3–8	—	39–12	38–0	24–10	38–15	28–35	26–14	32–21
Gloucester	26–30	34–49	34–31	—	26–15	17–36	54–21	35–37	21–15	21–30
Harlequins	31–47	14–40	41–24	19–26	—	7–36	52–14	38–31	33–52	20–14
Leicester Tigers	22–20	33–19	26–35	45–14	29–19	—	62–3	41–17	36–35	36–28
Newcastle Red Bulls	14–50	19–52	14–38	25–19	17–76	17–39	—	19–36	45–42	17–39
Northampton Saints	41–38	94–33	33–33	36–32	66–21	32–26	28–27	—	47–21	43–31
Sale Sharks	26–31	38–17	26–27	27–10	43–17	33–47	57–5	29–43	—	19–85
Saracens	29–36	50–17	24–30	30–14	26–12	19–15	73–14	17–21	65–14	—

Updated to match(es) played on 6 June 2026. Source: Premiership Rugby
Legend: Blue = home team win; Yellow = draw; Red = away team win.

=== Round 1 ===
25 September 2025
19:45

(1 BP) Sale Sharks	27–10	Gloucester
Try: Roebuck 16' m Jibulu 56' c Carpenter 71' c Andrews 79' m Con: Ford (2/4) 56', 72'; Pen: Ford (1/1) 69'	Report	Try: Clement 40+1' c Con: Byrne (1/1) 40+2'; Pen: Byrne (1/1) 35'

CorpAcq Stadium
Referee: Christophe Ridley

26 September 2025
19:45

Newcastle Red Bulls	17–39	Saracens (1 BP)
Try: Hearle 1' c Clarke 66' c Con: Connon (2/2) 2', 67'; Pen: Connon (1/1) 25'	Report	Try: Jackson 19' m Onyeama-Christie 32' c Tompkins (2) 57' c, 71' c Caluori 59' c Con: Farrell (3/4) 33', 58', 60'; Burke (1/1) 72'; Pen: Farrell (2/2) 3', 50'

Kingston Park
Referee: Adam Leal

26 September 2025
19:45

(1 BP) Harlequins	31–47	Bath (1 BP)
Try: W. Evans (3) 1' m, 8' c, 29' m Kenningham 70' c Green 79' c Con: J. Evans (3/5) 9', 71', 80'	Report	Try: Dunn 15' c Sela 33' c Obano 41' c Arundell (2) 56' m, 75' c Griffin 62' c Underhill 65' c Con: Spencer (5/6) 16', 34', 42', 63', 66' de Glanville (1/1) 76'

Twickenham Stoop
Referee: Karl Dickson

28 September 2025
13:00

(1 BP) Northampton Saints	33–33	Exeter Chiefs (1 BP)
Try: Coles 10' c Pearson 24' m Todaro (2) 27' c, 36' c Litchfield 32' c Con: Belleau (4/5) 11', 28', 33', 37'	Report	Try: Feyi-Waboso (2) 3' c, 68' c Brown-Bampoe 42' m Vintcent (2) 54' c, 65' c Con: Slade (4/5) 3', 55', 66', 69'

Franklin's Gardens
Referee: Joe James

28 September 2025
15:30

(1 BP) Bristol Bears	42–24	Leicester Tigers (1 BP)
Try: Harding 16' c Ibitoye 33' c Oghre 50' c Carrington 62' m Rees-Zammit 79' c Con: Jordan (4/5) 17', 34', 51', 80'; Pen: MacGinty (1/1) 4'; Jordan (2/2) 42', 78'	Report	Try: van Poortvliet 5' c Radwan (2) 13' m, 29' m Bailey 57' c Con: Bailey (2/3) 6, 58'

Ashton Gate
Referee: Anthony Woodthorpe

=== Round 2 ===
3 October 2025
19:45

(1 BP) Bath	28–16	Sale Sharks
Try: Arundell 6' c Redpath 24' c Obano 35' c Ojomoh 77' c Con: Spencer (4/4) 7', 25', 36', 78'	Report	Try: Jibulu 47' c Con: Ford (1/1) 48'; Pen: Ford (1/2) 2'; Drop: Ford (2/2) 19', 33'

The Recreation Ground
Referee: Anthony Woodthorpe

4 October 2025
15:00

(1 BP) Exeter Chiefs	38–15	Newcastle Red Bulls
Try: Feyi-Waboso (3) 9' m, 27' c, 56' c Vintcent 14' c Dweba 34' m Skinner 68' c Con: Slade (4/6) 15', 28', 57', 69'	Report	Try: McGuigan 37' c Hearle 76' m Con: Connon (1/1) 38'; Pen: Connon (1/1) 12'

Sandy Park
Referee: Craig Maxwell-Keys

4 October 2025
15:05

(1 BP) Leicester Tigers	29–19	Harlequins
Try: Wand (2) 55' c, 78' c van Poortvliet 62' c Hassell-Collins 71' m Con: Searle (3/4) 56', 63', 79'; Pen: Searle (1/1) 67'	Report	Try: Porter 37' c Con: J. Evans (1/1) 38'; Pen: J. Evans (3/3) 6', 18', 42'; Benson (1/1) 36'

Welford Road
Referee: Hamish Smales

4 October 2025
17:30

(1 BP) Saracens	50–17	Bristol Bears
Try: Dan 2' c Isiekwe 5' c Malins 20' c Tompkins 37' c J. Bracken (2) 46' c, 50' m Tizard 77' c Con: Farrell (6/7) 3', 6', 21', 38', 47', 78'; Pen: Farrell (1/1) 16'	Report	Try: Marmion (3) 42' m, 61' c, 72' m Con: Worsley (1/2) 62'

StoneX Stadium
Referee: Christophe Ridley

5 October 2025
15:00

(2 BP) Gloucester	35–37	Northampton Saints (1 BP)
Try: Jordan (2) 40' c, 61' c Joseph 41' c Venter 53' c Fasogbon 69' c Con: Byrne (5/5) 40+1', 42', 54', 62', 70'	Report	Try: Pearson 4' c Litchfield 8' c McParland 29' c Hendy 34' c Con: Belleau (4/4) 5', 9', 30', 35'; Pen: Belleau (3/3) 24', 45', 72'

Kingsholm
Referee: Adam Leal

=== Round 3 ===
10 October 2025
19:45

(1 BP) Sale Sharks	57–5	Newcastle Red Bulls
Try: R. du Preez 7' c Roebuck (3) 11' c, 54' c, 79' m Cowan-Dickie 14' c van Rhyn 32' m Reed (2) 40' m, 77' c Jibulu 71' c Con: Ford (6/9) 8', 12', 15', 55', 72', 78'	Report	Try: Obatoyinbo 48' m

CorpAcq Stadium
Referee: Joe James

11 October 2025
15:00

Bristol Bears	18–14	Exeter Chiefs (1 BP)
Try: Mata 25' m Oghre 56' c Con: Worsley (1/1) 57'; Pen: Jordan (1/1) 1'; Worsley (1/1) 80'	Report	Try: Slade 28' c Hammersley 32' c Con: Slade (2/2) 29', 33'

Ashton Gate
Referee: Anthony Woodthorpe

11 October 2025
15:05

(1 BP) Northampton Saints	32–26	Leicester Tigers (1 BP)
Try: F. Smith 11' c Todaro 33' m Pearson 40' m Belleau (2) 50' m, 60' c Con: F. Smith (2/5) 12', 61'; Pen: F. Smith (1/1) 68'	Report	Try: Steward 18' c Wells 45' c Con: Searle (2/2) 19', 46'; Pen: Searle (3/3) 1', 37', 56'; O'Connor (1/1) 71'

Franklin's Gardens
Referee: Luke Pearce

11 October 2025
17:30

(1 BP) Bath	38–17	Gloucester
Try: de Glanville 6' c Dunn 19' c Lawrence 25' c Richards (2) 29' c, 65' c Con: Russell (5/5) 7', 20', 26', 30', 66'; Pen: Russell (1/1) 61'	Report	Try: Joseph 40+1' c Thorley 53' m Loader 56' m Con: Byrne (1/3) 40+2'

The Recreation Ground
Referee: Karl Dickson

12 October 2025
15:00

Harlequins	20–14	Saracens (1 BP)
Try: Smith 8' c T. Green 41' c Con: Smith (2/2) 9', 42'; Pen: Smith (2/2) 32', 80'	Report	Try: Burke 26' c Earl 63' c Con: Farrell (2/2) 27', 64'

Twickenham Stoop
Referee: Adam Leal

=== Round 4 ===
17 October 2025
19:45

(1 BP) Gloucester	34–49	Bristol Bears (1 BP)
Try: Alemanno 16' c Blake 34' m Edwards-Giraud 36' m Joseph 58' c Venter 68' c Con: Byrne (3/5) 17', 59', 69'; Pen: Byrne (1/2) 10'	Report	Try: Worsley 4' c Oghre (2) 24' c, 52' c Harding 27' c Mata 62' c Ravouvou (2) 71' c, 76' c Con: Worsley (7/7) 5', 25', 28', 53', 63', 72', 77'

Kingsholm
Referee: Craig Maxwell-Keys

17 October 2025
19:45

Newcastle Red Bulls	19–36	Northampton Saints (1 BP)
Try: Spencer 26' m Mafi 31' c Coetzee 52' c Con: Connon (2/3) 32', 53'	Report	Try: van der Mescht 2' c Mitchell 7' c Freeman 38' c Todaro 58' m Coles 76' c Con: F. Smith (4/5) 3', 8', 39', 77'; Pen: F. Smith (1/2) 75'

Kingston Park
Referee: Ian Tempest

18 October 2025
15:05

Leicester Tigers	22–20	Bath (1 BP)
Try: Cracknell 7' c Reffell 36' m Smith 43' c Con: O'Connor (2/3) 8', 44'; Pen: Searle (1/1) 80+1'	Report	Try: Frost 2' m Underhill 12' m Redpath 24' c Con: Russell (1/3) 25'; Pen: Russell (1/1) 71'

Welford Road
Referee: Adam Leal

18 October 2025
17:30

(1 BP) Saracens	65–14	Sale Sharks
Try: González 11' m Caluori (5) 26' c, 45' m, 48' c, 73' m, 79' c Penalty try 40+1'; Tizard 42' c Burke 56' c Earl 66' m Con: Farrell (5/9) 27', 43', 49', 57', 80'; Pen: Farrell (1/1) 20'	Report	Try: Rodd 5' c R. du Preez 19' c Con: Ford (2/2) 6', 20'

StoneX Stadium
Referee: Matthew Carley

19 October 2025
15:00

(1 BP) Exeter Chiefs	38–0	Harlequins
Try: Feyi-Waboso 26' c Slade (2) 28' c, 79' c Skinner 35' c Fisilau 43' c Con: Slade (5/5) 27', 29', 36', 45', 80'; Pen: Slade (1/2) 3'	Report

Sandy Park
Referee: Karl Dickson

=== Round 5 ===
24 October 2025
19:45

(1 BP) Northampton Saints	43–31	Saracens (1 BP)
Try: Hendy 7' m Pearson (2) 17' c, 55' c Freeman (4) 24' m, 59' c, 67' c, 74' m Con: F. Smith (4/7) 18', 56', 60', 68'	Report	Try: Burke 28' c J. Bracken 35' m González 40+1' c Tizard 46' c Malins 70' m Con: Farrell (3/5) 29', 40+2', 47'

Franklin's Gardens
Referee: Anthony Woodthorpe

25 October 2025
15:00

(1 BP) Exeter Chiefs	39–12	Gloucester
Try: Dweba 4' c Slade (2) 14' c, 69' m Feyi-Waboso 17' c Yeandle 79' c Con: Slade (3/4) 5', 15', 18'; Hodge (1/1) 80'; Pen: Slade (2/2) 31', 40+2'	Report	Try: Joseph 6' c Thomas 24' m Con: Byrne (1/2) 7'

Sandy Park
Referee: Adam Leal

25 October 2025
15:00

(1 BP) Harlequins	52–14	Newcastle Red Bulls
Try: Northmore 10' c T. Green (2) 17' c, 39' c Porter 22' c Isgró 28' c W. Evans 43' m Cleaves 54' c Turner 62' m Con: Smith (6/8) 11', 18', 23', 29', 40', 55'	Report	Try: Leatherbarrow 75' c McCallum 80+1' c Con: Connon (2/2) 76', 80+2'

Twickenham Stoop
Referee: Craig Maxwell-Keys

25 October 2025
15:05

(1 BP) Bath	40–15	Bristol Bears
Try: Pepper 11' m Lawrence 32' c Redpath 35' c Cokanasiga 64' c Underhill 79' c Arundell 80+1' c Con: Russell (5/6) 33', 36', 65', 80', 80+2'	Report	Try: Ravouvou 1' m Oghre 22' c Con: Worsley (1/2) 23'; Pen: Worsley (1/1) 28'

The Recreation Ground
Referee: Ian Tempest

25 October 2025
17:30

(1 BP) Leicester Tigers	36–35	Sale Sharks (2 BP)
Try: Radwan (2) 8' m, 34' c Henderson 40+1' c Ilione 49' c Whiteley 58' c Con: O'Connor (3/4) 35', 40+2', 50'; Searle (1/1) 59'; Pen: O'Connor (1/1) 17'	Report	Try: O'Flaherty 37' c James (3) 46' c, 53' c, 70' c Roebuck 60' c Con: Ford (5/5) 38', 47', 54', 61', 71'

Welford Road
Referee: Karl Dickson

=== Round 6 ===
28 November 2025
19:45

Newcastle Red Bulls	17–39	Leicester Tigers (1 BP)
Try: Grayson 21' c Palframan 76' c Con: Connon (2/2) 22', 77'; Pen: Connon (1/1) 33'	Report	Try: Thompson 13' c Moro (2) 23' c, 72' c Steward 56' c Reffell 80' m Con: Searle (3/3) 14', 24', 57'; Bailey (1/2) 73'; Pen: Searle (2/2) 6', 62'

Kingston Park
Referee: Sara Cox

28 November 2025
19:45

(1 BP) Sale Sharks	26–27	Exeter Chiefs
Try: James 24' c Wills 46' c Con: Ford (1/1) 25'; R. du Preez (1/1) 47'; Pen: Ford (4/4) 11', 14', 18', 38'	Report	Try: Yeandle 54' c Woodburn 61' c Sio 69' c Con: Slade (3/3) 55', 62', 70'; Pen: Slade (2/3) 5', 16'

CorpAcq Stadium
Referee: Anthony Woodthorpe

29 November 2025
15:00

(1 BP) Gloucester	26–15	Harlequins
Try: Redshaw (2) 11' c, 59' c Ludlow 40' c Thorley 66' m Con: Byrne (3/4) 12', 40+1', 60'	Report	Try: Murley 9' m Dombrandt 23' c Con: Smith (1/2) 24'; Pen: Smith (1/1) 64'

Kingsholm
Referee: Luke Pearce

29 November 2025
17:45

(1 BP) Bristol Bears	46–12	Northampton Saints
Try: Marmion (2) 5' c, 15' c Jordan 9' c Ravouvou 28' c Boshoff 37' c Ivanishvili 80' m Con: Worsley (5/6) 6', 10', 16', 29', 38'; Pen: Worsley (2/2) 49', 73'	Report	Try: van der Mescht 45' c Litchfield 59' m Con: F. Smith (1/2) 46'

Ashton Gate
Referee: Ian Tempest

30 November 2025
15:00

(2 BP) Saracens	29–36	Bath (1 BP)
Try: Malins (2) 2' c, 31' m González (2) 13' c, 60' c Con: Farrell (3/4) 3', 14', 61'; Drop: Farrell (1/1) 34'	Report	Try: Arundell (2) 18' c, 75' c du Toit 37' c Butt 48' m Green 52' c Con: Russell (4/5) 19', 38', 53', 76'; Pen: Russell (1/1) 17'

StoneX Stadium
Referee: Christophe Ridley

=== Round 7 ===
19 December 2025
19:45

(1 BP) Leicester Tigers	45–14	Gloucester
Try: Thompson 11' c Kata 20' m Penalty try 39'; Whiteley 40' c Reffell 49' m Searle 62' c Chessum 71' c Con: Searle (3/5) 12', 41', 63'; Bailey (1/1) 72'	Report	Try: Hathaway 57' c Clement 74' c Con: Byrne (2/2) 58', 75'

Welford Road
Attendance: 20,460
Referee: Karl Dickson

20 December 2025
15:00

(1 BP) Northampton Saints	47–21	Sale Sharks
Try: Pollock 4' c Hendy (2) 11' m, 46' c Thame 16' c Kemeny 32' c Furbank 60' c Pearson 77' c Con: F. Smith (6/7) 5', 17', 33', 47', 61', 78'	Report	Try: O'Flaherty (2) 23' c, 53' c Reed 57' c Con: R. du Preez (3/3) 24', 54', 58'

Franklin's Gardens
Referee: Christophe Ridley

20 December 2025
15:00

(2 BP) Saracens	24–30	Exeter Chiefs (1 BP)
Try: Caluori (2) 6' c, 55' m Malins 11' m Penalty try 44'; Con: Farrell (1/3) 7'	Report	Try: Varney 34' c Fisilau (2) 63' m, 68' c Slade 79' c Con: Slade (2/4) 35', 69'; Pen: Slade (2/2) 3', 31'

StoneX Stadium
Referee: Luke Pearce

20 December 2025
18:00

Harlequins	14–40	Bristol Bears (1 BP)
Try: Isgró 59' c Smith 73' c Con: Smith (2/2) 60', 74'	Report	Try: Ravouvou 7' m Batley 25' c Oghre 31' c Rees-Zammit 40+1' c Grondona 43' c Genge 63' c Con: Jordan (4/5) 26', 32' 40+2', 44'; Williams (1/1) 64'

Allianz Stadium
Referee: Anthony Woodthorpe

21 December 2025
15:00

Newcastle Red Bulls	14–50	Bath (1 BP)
Try: Leatherbarrow 3' c Mafi 26' c Con: Connon (2/2) 4', 27'	Report	Try: Frost (2) 11' m, 22'; Griffin 31' c van Wyk 42' c Butt 52' c de Glanville 66' m Spencer 68' m Hill 78' c Con: Carreras (5/8) 23', 32', 43', 53', 79'

Kingston Park
Referee: Hamish Smales

=== Round 8 ===
26 December 2025
17:30

(1 BP) Sale Sharks	43–17	Harlequins
Try: Wills 8' m Cowan-Dickie 17' c Vermeulen (2) 46' c, 54' m Ma'asi-White 59' c Quirke 63' c Jibulu 67' m Con: Ford (2/4) 18', 47'; R. du Preez (2/3) 60', 64'	Report	Try: Smith 2' c Walker 40+2' c Con: Smith (2/2) 3', 40+3'; Pen: Smith (1/1) 12'

CorpAcq Stadium
Referee: Ian Tempest

27 December 2025
15:00

(1 BP) Bristol Bears	36–27	Newcastle Red Bulls (1 BP)
Try: Rees-Zammit (2) 19' m, 56' c Moroni 21' c Heward 44' m Ravouvou 50' m Oghre 60' c Con: Jordan (2/5) 22', 57'; Williams (1/1) 61'	Report	Try: McCallum 6' m Spencer (2) 14' m, 47' c Leatherbarrow 26' c Con: Connon (2/4) 27', 48'; Pen: Connon (1/1) 43'

Ashton Gate
Referee: George Selwood

27 December 2025
15:05

Gloucester	21–30	Saracens (1 BP)
Try: Thomas 19' c Clark 39' c W. Knight 80+2' c Con: Byrne (3/3) 20', 40', 80+3'	Report	Try: Dan 8' c McFarland (2) 23' c, 45' m van Zyl 51' m Con: Farrell (2/4) 9', 24'; Pen: Farrell (2/2) 32', 67'

Kingsholm
Referee: Adam Leal

27 December 2025
17:30

Bath	21–41	Northampton Saints (1 BP)
Try: du Toit (2) 7' c, 45' c Dunn 14' c Con: Russell (3/3) 8', 15', 46'	Report	Try: Freeman (3) 2' c, 52' c, 75' m McParland 21' c Pollock (2) 55' c, 65' m Con: Belleau (4/6) 3', 22', 53', 56'; Pen: Belleau (1/1) 71'

The Recreation Ground
Referee: Craig Maxwell-Keys

28 December 2025
15:00

Exeter Chiefs	24–10	Leicester Tigers
Try: Fisilau 9' c Ridl 24' c Varney 71' c Con: Slade (3/3) 10', 25', 72'; Pen: Slade (1/1) 49'	Report	Try: Henderson 34' c Con: Searle (1/1) 35'; Pen: Searle (1/1) 76'

Sandy Park
Referee: Anthony Woodthorpe

=== Round 9 ===
2 January 2026
19:45

Bristol Bears	19–17	Sale Sharks (1 BP)
Try: Owen 40' c Moroni 54' m Ravouvou 71' c Con: Jordan (1/2) 40+1'; Williams (1/1) 72'	Report	Try: O'Flaherty 16' c van Rhyn 43' c Con: Ford (2/2) 17', 44'; Pen: Ford (1/1) 49'

Ashton Gate
Referee: Joe James

2 January 2026
19:45

Newcastle Red Bulls	25–19	Gloucester (1 BP)
Try: McGuigan 7' c Christie 16' m Cruz 45' c Con: Connon (2/3) 8', 46'; Pen: Connon (2/2) 40+1', 54'	Report	Try: Thorley 22' m Austin 60' c C. Knight 71' c Con: Byrne (2/3) 61', 72'

Kingston Park
Referee: Christophe Ridley

3 January 2026
15:05

(1 BP) Bath	33–26	Exeter Chiefs (2 BP)
Try: Obano 6' c Barbeary 11' c Carreras 13' c Lawrence 19' m Green 79' c Con: Russell (4/5) 7', 12', 14', 80'	Report	Try: Dweba 32' c Woodburn 36' c Fisilau 66' m Feyi-Waboso 72' c Con: Slade (3/4) 33', 37', 73'

The Recreation Ground
Referee: Luke Pearce

3 January 2026
17:30

(1 BP) Northampton Saints	66–21	Harlequins
Try: Fischetti (2) 14' c, 26' c Coles (3) 17' m, 50' c, 80' c Mitchell 19' c Freeman 31' c Todaro (2) 53' c, 70' m F. Smith 68' c Con: F. Smith (8/10) 15', 20', 27', 32', 51', 54', 69', 80+1'	Report	Try: Cleaves 1' c Dombrandt (2) 29' c, 74' c Con: Smith (3/3) 2', 30', 75'

Franklin's Gardens
Referee: Sara Cox

4 January 2026
15:00

(1 BP) Leicester Tigers	36–28	Saracens (1 BP)
Try: Steward 4' c Cracknell 11' c Radwan (2) 26' m, 59' c Heyes 39' c Con: Searle (4/4) 5', 12', 40', 60'; Pen: Searle (1/1) 54'	Report	Try: McFarland 21' c Carré 51' c González 63' c C. Bracken 78' c Con: Burke (4/4) 22', 52', 64', 79'

Welford Road
Referee: Matthew Carley

=== Round 10 ===
23 January 2026
19:45

(2 BP) Gloucester	26–30	Bath (1 BP)
Try: Rapava-Ruskin 7' c C. Atkinson 19' c S. Atkinson 24' c Fasogbon 51' m Con: Barton (3/4) 8', 20', 25'	Report	Try: Hennessey 2' c Frost 32' m Pepper 37' c Russell 64' m Con: Russell (2/4) 3', 38'; Pen: Russell (2/2) 72', 76'

Kingsholm
Referee: Ian Tempest

24 January 2026
15:00

(1 BP) Exeter Chiefs	3–8	Bristol Bears
Pen: Slade (1/2) 28'	Report	Try: Heward 35' m Pen: Williams (1/1) 79'

Sandy Park
Referee: Karl Dickson

24 January 2026
15:00

(1 BP) Saracens	73–14	Newcastle Red Bulls
Try: Penalty try 8'; Segun 16' c Caluori (4) 23' c, 31' c, 43' m, 75' m Onyeama-Christie 41' c Hadfield (2) 53' c, 64' c Mawi 61' c Tompkins 78' c Con: Farrell (8/10) 17', 24', 32', 42', 54', 62', 65', 79'	Report	Try: Usher 2' c Parsons 80+1' c Con: Connon (2/2) 3', 80+2'

StoneX Stadium
Referee: Joe James

24 January 2026
15:05

Harlequins	7–34	Leicester Tigers (1 BP)
Try: Cunningham-South 80' c Con: Smith (1/1) 80+2'	Report	Try: Hamer-Webb 19' c van Poortvliet 25' c Steward 60' c Blamire 72' m Perese 74' m Con: Searle (3/3) 20', 26', 61'; Pen: Searle (1/1) 32'

Twickenham Stoop
Referee: Adam Leal

24 January 2026
17:30

(1 BP) Sale Sharks	29–43	Northampton Saints (1 BP)
Try: Quirke 23' c Carpenter 41' m O'Flaherty (2) 54' c, 61' c Con: Ford (3/4) 24', 55', 62'; Pen: Ford (1/1) 40+2'	Report	Try: Freeman 6' c Hutchinson 11' c R. Smith 46' c Todaro 56' m Kemeny 64' m Coles 75' m Pollock 77' c Con: Belleau (3/5) 7', 12', 47'; Furbank (1/2) 78'

CorpAcq Stadium
Referee: Anthony Woodthorpe

=== Round 11 ===
20 March 2026
19:45

(1 BP) Bath	62–15	Saracens
Try: Muir 15' c Bayliss 20' c Barbeary 24' c Arundell (2) 36' c, 64' c Spencer 49' m Tuipulotu 53' c Pepper 72' c van der Linde 75' m Con: Russell (7/9) 16', 21', 25', 37', 54', 64', 73'; Pen: Russell (1/1) 40+2'	Report	Try: Elliott (2) 1' c, 28' m Con: Farrell (1/2) 1'; Pen: Farrell (1/1) 13'

The Recreation Ground
Referee: Matthew Carley

21 March 2026
15:00

(1 BP) Harlequins	19–26	Gloucester (1 BP)
Try: Waghorn 18' c Smith 26' c Kenningham 62' m Con: Smith (2/3) 18', 27'	Report	Try: Clement 5' c Redshaw 57' m C. Atkinson 65' c Clark 72' c Con: C. Atkinson (3/4) 6', 65', 72'

Twickenham Stoop
Referee: Sara Cox

21 March 2026
15:00

(1 BP) Northampton Saints	28–27	Newcastle Red Bulls (2 BP)
Try: McParland 1' c Sleightholme 20' c Langdon 54' c Litchfield 76' c Con: Belleau (4/4) 2', 21', 55', 77'	Report	Try: Leatherbarrow 7' c Obatoyinbo 15' m Benítez Cruz 71' m Christie 79' c Con: Connon (2/4) 8', 79'; Pen: Connon (1/1) 70'

Franklin's Gardens
Referee: Ian Tempest

21 March 2026
15:05

(1 BP) Exeter Chiefs	26–14	Sale Sharks
Try: Varney 4' m Ridl 11' c Woodburn 30' c Brown-Bampoe 64' c Con: Slade (3/4) 12', 30', 65'	Report	Try: van Rhyn 21' c D. du Preez 44' c Con: R. du Preez (2/2) 22', 45'

Sandy Park
Referee: Anthony Woodthorpe

22 March 2026
15:00

(1 BP) Leicester Tigers	33–19	Bristol Bears
Try: Moro 17' c Liebenberg 20' c Perese 65' m Hamer-Webb 80+1' m Con: Searle (2/4) 18', 21'; Pen: Searle (3/3) 38', 44', 77'	Report	Con: Harding (2) 29' c, 52' c Ravouvou 31' m Pen: Worsley (1/2) 30'; Williams (1/1) 52' c

Welford Road
Referee: Luke Pearce

=== Round 12 ===
27 March 2026
19:45

Newcastle Red Bulls	14–38	Exeter Chiefs (1 BP)
Try: Wade 31' c Hancock 79' c Con: Connon (1/1) 32'; Healy (1/1) 80'	Report	Try: Brown-Bampoe (2) 5' m, 15' m Ridl (2) 10' c, 36' c Woodburn 25' c Varney 41' c Con: Skinner (4/6) 11', 26', 37', 42'

Kingston Park
Referee: Craig Maxwell-Keys

28 March 2026
13:00

Gloucester	17–36	Leicester Tigers (1 BP)
Try: Alemanno 21' m Joseph 42' c Bleuler 72' m Con: Atkinson	Report	Try: Wand 1' c Hamer-Webb 5' m Blamire (2) 11' m, 15' m Bailey 39' c Wells 77' c Con: Searle (2/5) 2', 40'; O'Connor (1/1) 78'

Villa Park
Referee: Matthew Carley

28 March 2026
15:30

(1 BP) Bristol Bears	14–18	Harlequins
Try: Harding 7' c Luatua 76' c Con: Williams (2/2) 8', 76'	Report	Try: Dombrandt 22' m Isgró 58' c Con: Benson (1/1) 59'; Pen: J. Evans (1/1) 51'; Benson (1/1) 78'

Principality Stadium
Referee: Adam Leal

28 March 2026
18:00

(1 BP) Saracens	17–21	Northampton Saints
Try: Elliott 21' c Dan 44' c Con: Farrell (2/2) 22', 45'; Pen: Burke (1/1) 72'	Report	Try: Litchfield 6' c McParland (2) 12' c, 77' c Con: Smith (2/2) 7', 13'; Hutchinson (1/1) 78'

Tottenham Hotspur Stadium
Referee: Anthony Woodthorpe

29 March 2026
15:00

(2 BP) Sale Sharks	26–31	Bath (1 BP)
Try: O'Flaherty 26' c R. du Preez 30' c Cowan-Dickie 38' m Roebuck 58' c Con: Ford (3/4) 27', 31', 59'	Report	Try: Frost 18' c Hennessey 44' c Staddon 49' m van der Linde 62' c Barbeary 71' m Con: Carreras (3/5) 19', 45', 63'

CorpAcq Stadium
Referee: Luke Pearce

=== Round 13 ===
17 April 2026
19:45

(1 BP) Bristol Bears	53–12	Gloucester Rugby
Try: Marmion 3' c Ravouvou (2) 13' m, 16' c Harding 32' c Penalty try 37'; Jordan 44' c Oghre 55' c Con: Williams (5/6) 4', 17', 33', 45', 56'; Pen: Jordan (2/2) 75', 80'	Report	Try: Barton 10' m Gwynne 42' c Con: Barton (1/2) 43'

Ashton Gate
Referee: Ian Tempest

18 April 2026
15:00

(1 BP) Leicester Tigers	62–3	Newcastle Red Bulls
Try: Blamire (2) 2' c, 10' c Hamer-Webb (5) 13' m, 16' m, 29' c, 59' c, 66' m Perese 49' c Radwan (2) 70' m, 75' c Con: Searle (3/5) 3', 11', 30'; Bailey (3/5) 50', 60', 76'	Report	Pen: Healy (1/1) 5'

Welford Road
Referee: Joe James

18 April 2026
15:05

(2 BP) Exeter Chiefs	28–35	Northampton Saints (1 BP)
Try: Feyi-Waboso 1' c Rigg 6' c Ridl 58' c Brown-Bampoe 76' c Con: Slade (4/4) 2', 7', 59', 77'	Report	Try: Mitchell 13' c Sleightholme 40+1' c Furbank 63' c Pollock 73' c F. Smith 79' c Con: F. Smith (5/5) 14', 40+2', 64', 74', 80'

Sandy Park
Referee: Adam Leal

18 April 2026
17:30

(1 BP) Bath Rugby	48–15	Harlequins
Try: Carreras (2) 3' c, 29' c Carr-Smith 13' c Dunn 42' m Richards 48' m Bayliss 55' m Pepper 62' c van der Linde 80' m Con: Russell (3/5) 4', 14', 30'; Carreras (1/3) 63'	Report	Try: Bradley 11' m Treadwell 45' c Con: Smith (1/2) 46'; Pen: Smith (1/1) 27'

The Recreation Ground
Referee: Sara Cox

19 April 2026
15:00

Sale Sharks	19–85	Saracens (1 BP)
Try: O'Flaherty (2) 44' m, 69' c Fordjour 77' c Con: Ford (2/3) 70', 78'	Report	Try: Segun 2' c Caluori (5) 10' c, 37' m, 49' c, 52' c, 56' c Willis 17' m Carré 33' c Burke 35' c C. Bracken 47' c Michelow 62' m Malins 66' c Earl 73' c Con: Burke (8/10) 3', 11', 34', 36', 48', 50', 53', 57'; Farrell (2/3) 67', 74'

CorpAcq Stadium
Referee: Christophe Ridley

=== Round 14 ===
24 April 2026
19:45

Newcastle Red Bulls	19–52	Bristol Bears (1 BP)
Try: Brocklebank 20' m Wade 50' c Hodge 65' c Con: Healy (1/1) 51'; Hodge (1/1) 66'	Report	Try: Lane 9' c Ravouvou 11' c Jordan 24' c Heward 41' c Moroni 44' m Janse van Rensburg (2) 61' c, 70' m Thacker 79' c Con: Jordan (4/5) 10', 12', 25', 42'; Williams (2/3) 62', 80'

Kingston Park
Referee: Anthony Woodthorpe

25 April 2026
15:00

(1 BP) Harlequins	33–52	Sale Sharks (1 BP)
Try: Cunningham-South 14' c Petti 20' c Benson 24' c Hyde 48' m Riley 56' c Con: Smith (4/5) 15', 21', 25', 57'	Report	Try: Dugdale (2) 1' m, 68' c Longstaff 6' c Ford 28' c O'Flaherty 31' m Harper (2) 59' c, 76' c Roebuck 79' c Con: Ford (6/8) 7', 29', 60', 69', 77', 80'

Twickenham Stoop
Referee: George Selwood

25 April 2026
15:05

Saracens	19–15	Leicester Tigers (1 BP)
Try: Hartley 3' c Caluori 20' m Mawi 48' c Con: Burke (2/3) 4', 49'	Report	Try: Steward 10' c Hassell-Collins 31' m Con: Searle (1/2) 11'; Pen: Searle (1/2) 66'

StoneX Stadium
Referee: Karl Dickson

25 April 2026
17:30

(1 BP) Northampton Saints	41–38	Bath (2 BP)
Try: F. Smith 2' c Freeman (3) 14' c, 29' m, 72' c Sleightholme (2) 19' c, 46' m Con: F. Smith (4/6) 3', 15', 20', 73'; Pen: F. Smith (1/1) 80+2'	Report	Try: Hennessey 8' c Green 25' c Carr-Smith 40' c de Glanville 49' m Griffin 59' m Tuipulotu 75' c Con: Donoghue (4/6) 9', 26', 41', 76'

Franklin's Gardens
Referee: Luke Pearce

26 April 2026
15:00

(1 BP) Gloucester	34–31	Exeter Chiefs (2 BP)
Try: Llewellyn (2) 3' c, 24' c Williams 21' m Trenholm (2) 32' c, 63' m Con: Barton (3/5) 4', 25', 33'; Pen: Barton (1/1) 47'	Report	Try: Vintcent 1' m Feyi-Waboso 27' c Fisilau 43' c Penalty try 67'; Slade 71' m Con: Slade (2/4) 28', 44'

Kingsholm
Referee: Matthew Carley

=== Round 15 ===
8 May 2026
19:45

Gloucester	21–15	Sale Sharks (1 BP)
Try: Loader 36' c C. Atkinson (2) 50' c, 76' c Con: Barton (3/3) 37', 51', 77'	Report	Try: Longstaff 7' m O'Flaherty 23' c Con: Ford (1/2) 24'; Pen: Ford (1/1) 72'

Kingsholm
Referee: Sara Cox

9 May 2026
15:05

(1 BP) Leicester Tigers	41–17	Northampton Saints
Try: Martin 7' m Hassell-Collins 25' c Blamire (2) 31' c, 49' m Steward 68' c Con: O'Connor (3/5) 26', 32', 47'; Bailey (1/1) 69'; Pen: O'Connor (1/1) 44'	Report	Try: Freeman (2) 20' m, 78' m Hendy 70' c Con: F. Smith (1/3) 71'

Welford Road
Referee: Matthew Carley

9 May 2026
17:30

(1 BP) Bristol Bears	26–41	Saracens (1 BP)
Try: Harding 2' c Thacker 24' c Moroni 32' c Ravouvou 72' m Con: Jordan (3/4) 3', 25', 33'	Report	Try: Willis 17' m Tizard 19' c Segun 26' c Earl 29' c Burke 36' m Elliott 78' c Con: Burke (3/5) 20', 27', 30'; Farrell (1/1) 79'; Pen: Burke (1/1) 6'

Ashton Gate
Referee: Christophe Ridley

10 May 2026
15:00

Newcastle Red Bulls	17–76	Harlequins (1 BP)
Try: Brocklebank 20' m Hodge (2) 43' m, 62' c Con: Healy (1/1) 63'	Report	Try: Dombrandt 2' c Benson (3) 12' m, 53' c, 56' c Bradley (2) 15' c, 57' m Murley 23' m Riley 31' c Smith 34' c Hobson 38' c Northmore 44' m Staples 67' c Con: Smith (8/12) 3', 16', 32', 35', 39', 54', 57', 68'

Kingston Park
Referee: Harry Walbaum

10 May 2026
15:30

(1 BP) Exeter Chiefs	35–12	Bath
Try: Iosefa-Scott 17' c Brown-Bampoe 46' m Ikitau 63' c Ridl 74' c Con: Skinner (1/1) 18'; Slade (2/3) 64', 75'; Pen: Slade (3/4) 2', 12', 78'	Report	Try: Frost 25' m Underhill 53' c Con: Russell (1/2) 54'

Sandy Park
Referee: Karl Dickson

=== Round 16 ===
15 May 2026
19:45

(1 BP) Northampton Saints	94–33	Bristol Bears (1 BP)
Try: Hendy (4) 3' c, 40' c, 51' c, 79' c Hutchinson (2) 7' c, 34' c Chick 10' m Coles 21' c McParland (2) 23' c, 45' m Furbank 28' c Kemeny 37' c Pollock 41' c Graham 75' c Con: F. Smith (11/13) 3', 8', 22', 24', 29', 35', 38', 42', 51', 76', 80'; Hutchinson (1/1) 41'	Report	Try: Thacker 5' c Rees-Zammit 13' c Randall 43' c Ivanishvili 56' m Heward 70' c Con: Williams (4/5) 6', 14', 44', 71'

Franklin's Gardens
Referee: Luke Pearce

16 May 2026
15:00

(1 BP) Bath	69–12	Newcastle Red Bulls
Try: Hill 7' m Arundell (4) 11' m, 20' c, 60' m, 72' c Redpath 23' c Bayliss 25' c Carreras (2) 65' c, 67' m Frost 73' c Harris 76' c Con: Russell (7/11) 20', 24', 26', 65', 72', 74', 77'	Report	Try: Hearle (2) 56' m, 62' c Con: Connon (1/2) 63'

The Recreation Ground
Referee: Ian Tempest

16 May 2026
16:00

(1 BP) Harlequins	41–24	Exeter Chiefs (1 BP)
Try: Kenningham 21' c Northmore 34' c Murley 45' m Porter 63' m W. Evans 75' c Wenger 80' c Con: M. Smith (4/6) 22', 35', 76', 80+1'; Pen: M. Smith (1/1) 68'	Report	Try: Ridl 6' m Varney 9' c Norey 25' m Ikitau 31' c Con: Slade (2/4) 10', 32'

Allianz Stadium
Referee: Matthew Carley

16 May 2026
18:30

(1 BP) Saracens	30–14	Gloucester
Try: Segun (2) 6' m, 12' c Earl 43' m Dan 51' c Con: Burke (1/3) 13'; Farrell (1/1) 52'; Pen: Burke (2/2) 10', 29'	Report	Try: Joseph (2) 70' c, 77' c Con: Atkinson (2/2) 71', 78'

StoneX Stadium
Referee: Adam Leal

17 May 2026
15:00

(1 BP) Sale Sharks	33–47	Leicester Tigers (1 BP)
Try: Roebuck 8' m Vermeulen 30' c van Rhyn 65' c Dugdale 69' c Reed 77' c Con: Ford (4/5) 31', 66', 70', 78'	Report	Try: Chessum 1' c Blamire 14' c Moro 22' c Heyes 38' c Wand 42' c Hassell-Collins 50' m van der Flier 55' c Con: O'Connor (1/1) 2'; Bailey (5/6) 15', 23', 39', 43', 56'

CorpAcq Stadium
Referee: Hamish Smales

=== Round 17 ===
29 May 2026
19:45

Bristol Bears	21–19	Bath (1 BP)
Try: Harding 34' c Penalty try 43'; Lahiff 65' c Con: MacGinty (1/1) 35'; Jordan (1/1) 66'	Report	Try: Lawrence 19' c Pepper 28' m du Toit 40+1' c Con: Donoghue (2/3) 21', 40+2'

Ashton Gate
Referee: Karl Dickson

30 May 2026
15:00

(1 BP) Saracens	26–12	Harlequins
Try: Penalty try 7'; Malins 24' m Tompkins 76' c Dan 80' c Con: Farrell (2/2) 77', 80+1'	Report	Try: Bradley 62' c Anderson 78' m Con: Smith (1/2) 63'

StoneX Stadium
Referee: Luke Pearce

30 May 2026
15:00

(1 BP) Northampton Saints	36–32	Gloucester (2 BP)
Try: Hendy 20' c F. Smith 22' c Hutchinson 33' m Freeman 53' m Graham 65' c Furbank 79' m Con: F. Smith (3/6) 21', 23', 66'	Report	Try: Gwynne 5' m Thorley 15' c S. Atkinson 26' c Loader 50' m Llewellyn 59' m Con: C. Atkinson (2/5) 16', 27'; Pen: C. Atkinson (1/1) 76'

Franklin's Gardens
Referee: Sara Cox

30 May 2026
19:45

(1 BP) Newcastle Red Bulls	45–42	Sale Sharks (2 BP)
Try: Christie (2) 10' m, 66' c Mafi 28' m Hearle (3) 43' c, 71' c, 80' c Lockwood 54' c Con: Connon (1/3) 44'; Healy (4/4) 55', 67', 72', 80+1'	Report	Try: Roebuck 1' c Kelly 5' c O'Flaherty 14' c Carpenter 23' c Longstaff 32' c Reed 62' c Con: Ford (6/6) 2', 6', 15', 24', 33', 63'

Kingston Park
Referee: Christophe Ridley

31 May 2026
15:30

Leicester Tigers	26–35	Exeter Chiefs (1 BP)
Try: Pearson 13' m Cracknell 60' c Clare 69' m Con: Bailey (1/3) 61'; Pen: Bailey (3/3) 4', 28', 40+2'	Report	Try: Woodburn (2) 6' c, 53' c Ikitau 42' m Zambonin 72' c Con: Slade (3/4) 7', 54', 73'; Pen: Slade (3/3) 12', 33', 80'

Welford Road
Referee: Anthony Woodthorpe

=== Round 18 ===
6 June 2026
15:15

(1 BP) Bath	24–22	Leicester Tigers (1 BP)
Try: du Toit (3) 8' m, 13' c, 49' c Cokanasiga 32' m Con: Carreras (2/4) 14', 50'	Report	Try: Bailey 3' c van Poortvliet 37' c Pearson 78'; Con: O'Connor (2/2) 4', 38'; Pen: O'Connor (1/1) 25'

The Recreation Ground
Referee: Ian Tempest

6 June 2026
15:15

(1 BP) Exeter Chiefs	32–12	Saracens
Try: Norey 43' m Slade 46' c Zambonin 64' c Varney 77' c Con: Slade (3/4) 47', 65' 78'; Pen: Slade (2/2) 17', 51'	Report	Try: Elliott 7' m Isiekwe 71' c Con: Farrell (1/1) 72'

Sandy Park
Referee: Karl Dickson

6 June 2026
15:15

(1 BP) Gloucester	54–21	Newcastle Red Bulls
Try: Redshaw (3) 1' c, 33' c, 73' m Clark 26' c Englefield 30' c Llewellyn 37' c Blake 46' c Venter 55' c Con: C. Atkinson (7/8) 2', 27', 31', 34', 38', 47', 56'	Report	Try: McGuigan 5' c Christie 19' c Benítez Cruz 67' c Con: Connon (2/2) 6', 19'; Healy (1/1) 67'

Kingsholm
Referee: Joe James

6 June 2026
15:15

(1 BP) Harlequins	38–31	Northampton Saints (2 BP)
Try: Dombrandt (2) 9' c, 71' c Benson 39' m Cleaves 49' c Anderson 58' m Lawday 79' c Con: Smith (3/4) 10', 72', 80'; Benson (1/2) 50'	Report	Try: Weimann (2) 5' c, 64' c van der Mescht 16' m Kemeny 47' c Thame 60' m Con: Belleau (3/5) 6', 48', 65'

Twickenham Stoop
Referee: Craig Maxwell-Keys

6 June 2026
15:15

(1 BP) Sale Sharks	38–17	Bristol Bears
Try: Ford 1' c Bamber 4' c Reed (2) 16' c, 62' m Carpenter 23' m Ma'asi-White 43' c Con: Ford (4/6) 2', 5', 17', 44'	Report	Try: Heward 26' c Gwilliam 39' m Worsley 74' m Con: Worsley (1/3) 26'

CorpAcq Stadium
Referee: Anthony Woodthorpe

== Play-offs ==
As in previous seasons, the top four teams in the Premiership table, following the conclusion of the regular season, contested the play-off semi-finals in a 1st vs 4th and 2nd vs 3rd format, with the higher ranking team having home advantage. The two winners of the semi-finals then met in the Premiership Final at Allianz Stadium in Twickenham, London on 20 June 2026.

Semi-finals
12 June 2026 – Franklin's Gardens
Northampton Saints	45
Leicester Tigers	31
13 June 2026 – The Recreation Ground
Bath	26
Exeter Chiefs	27

Final
20 June 2026 – Twickenham
Northampton Saints	26
Exeter Chiefs	17

=== Semi-finals ===
12 June 2026
19:45

Northampton Saints (1)	45–31	(4) Leicester Tigers
Try: Litchfield (3) 1' c, 15' c, 39' m Freeman 19' c Furbank (2) 43' c, 74' m McParland 65' c Con: Smith (5/7) 2', 16', 19', 44', 66'	Report	Try: Liebenberg 6' m Steward 12' c Hassell-Collins (2) 35' c, 70' m Bailey 47' c Con: Searle (3/5) 13', 35', 48'

Franklin's Gardens
Referee: Luke Pearce

Team details

FB	15	(England) George Furbank (c)
RW	14	(England) Tommy Freeman
OC	13	(England) Tom Litchfield		(substituted off) 57'
IC	12	(Scotland) Rory Hutchinson
LW	11	(England) George Hendy
FH	10	(England) Fin Smith
SH	9	(England) Archie McParland		(substituted off) 78'
N8	8	(England) Henry Pollock
OF	7	(England) Tom Pearson		(substituted off) 66'
BF	6	(Australia) Josh Kemeny
RL	5	(England) Ed Prowse		(substituted off) 62'
LL	4	(England) Alex Coles		(substituted off) 77'
TP	3	(Scotland) Elliot Millar Mills		(substituted off) 62'
HK	2	(England) Curtis Langdon		(substituted off) 53'
LP	1	(England) Emmanuel Iyogun		(substituted off) 53'
Substitutions:
HK	16	(England) Craig Wright	(yellow card) 77'	(substituted on) 53'
PR	17	(Italy) Danilo Fischetti		(substituted on) 53'
PR	18	(England) Luke Green		(substituted on) 62'
LK	19	(South Africa) JJ van der Mescht		(substituted on) 62'
LK	20	(England) Tom Lockett		(substituted on) 77'
BR	21	(England) Callum Chick		(substituted on) 66'
SH	22	(England) Jonny Weimann		(substituted on) 78'
CE	23	(England) Fraser Dingwall		(substituted on) 57'
Coach:
(England) Phil Dowson

FB	15	(England) Freddie Steward
RW	14	(England) Adam Radwan
OC	13	(England) Will Wand	(substituted off) 57'
IC	12	(England) Orlando Bailey	(substituted off) 66'
LW	11	(England) Ollie Hassell-Collins
FH	10	(England) Billy Searle
SH	9	(England) Jack van Poortvliet	(substituted off) 76'
N8	8	(Argentina) Joaquín Moro	(substituted off) 63'
OF	7	(Wales) Tommy Reffell
BF	6	(South Africa) Hanro Liebenberg
RL	5	(England) Ollie Chessum (c)
LL	4	(England) George Martin	(substituted off) 73'
TP	3	(England) Joe Heyes	(substituted off) 66'
HK	2	(England) Jamie Blamire	(substituted off) 56'
LP	1	(Wales) Nicky Smith	(substituted off) 44'
Substitutions:
HK	16	(England) Charlie Clare	(substituted on) 56'
PR	17	(England) Archie van der Flier	(substituted on) 44'
PR	18	(Scotland) Will Hurd	(substituted on) 66'
LK	19	(Scotland) Cameron Henderson	(substituted on) 73'
BR	20	(Wales) Olly Cracknell	(substituted on) 63'
SH	21	(England) Tom Whiteley	(substituted on) 76'
CE	22	(Tonga) Solomone Kata	(substituted on) 66'
CE	23	(Australia) Izaia Perese	(substituted on) 57'
Coach:
(England) Geoff Parling

Player of the Match:
(England) Fin Smith (Northampton Saints)
Assistant referees:
Anthony Woodthorpe
Adam Leal
Television Match Official:
Stuart Terheege

13 June 2026
15:00

Bath (2)	26–27	(3) Exeter Chiefs
Try: Obano 11' c du Toit 19' c Cokanasiga 27' c Arundell 32' m Con: Carreras (3/4) 12', 20', 28'	Report	Try: Tshiunza 24' c Hammersley 50' c Fisilau 55' m Burger 67' m Con: Slade (2/4) 25', 51'; Pen: Skinner (1/1) 15'

The Recreation Ground
Referee: Christophe Ridley

Team details

FB	15	(England) Tom de Glanville
RW	14	(England) Joe Cokanasiga	(yellow card) 64'
OC	13	(England) Ollie Lawrence
IC	12	(England) Max Ojomoh		(substituted off) 68'
LW	11	(England) Henry Arundell
FH	10	(Argentina) Santiago Carreras
SH	9	(England) Ben Spencer (c)		(substituted off) 76'
N8	8	(England) Alfie Barbeary
OF	7	(England) Sam Underhill		(substituted off) 51'
BF	6	(Scotland) Josh Bayliss
RL	5	(England) Charlie Ewels		(substituted off) 58'
LL	4	(Ireland) Quinn Roux		(substituted off) 51'
TP	3	(South Africa) Thomas du Toit		(substituted off) 61'
HK	2	(England) Tom Dunn		(substituted off) 58'
LP	1	(England) Beno Obano		(substituted off) 58'
Substitutions:
HK	16	(England) Kepu Tuipulotu		(substituted on) 58'
PR	17	(South Africa) Francois van Wyk		(substituted on) 58'
PR	18	(England) Billy Sela		(substituted on) 61'
LK	19	(Ireland) Ross Molony		(substituted on) 58'
LK	20	(England) Ted Hill		(substituted on) 51'
SH	21	(South Africa) Bernard van der Linde		(substituted on) 76'
CE	22	(Scotland) Cameron Redpath		(substituted on) 68'
BR	23	(England) Miles Reid		(substituted on) 51'
Coach:
(South Africa) Johann van Graan

FB	15	(England) Olly Woodburn
RW	14	(England) Paul Brown-Bampoe
OC	13	(England) Henry Slade	(yellow card) 10'
IC	12	(Australia) Len Ikitau
LW	11	(England) Campbell Ridl		(substituted off) 31'
FH	10	(England) Harvey Skinner
SH	9	(Italy) Stephen Varney
N8	8	(England) Greg Fisilau
OF	7	(Wales) Christ Tshiunza		(substituted off) 61'
BF	6	(Australia) Tom Hooper
RL	5	(Italy) Andrea Zambonin
LL	4	(Wales) Dafydd Jenkins (c)		(substituted off) 76'
TP	3	(England) Josh Iosefa-Scott		(substituted off) 44'
HK	2	(England) Max Norey		(substituted off) 44'
LP	1	(Samoa) Scott Sio		(substituted off) 44'
Substitutions:
HK	16	(South Africa) Joseph Dweba		(substituted on) 44'
PR	17	(South Africa) Ethan Burger		(substituted on) 44'
PR	18	(Georgia (country)) Bachuki Tchumbadze		(substituted on) 44'
LK	19	(England) Rus Tuima		(substituted on) 76'
BR	20	(Italy) Ross Vintcent		(substituted on) 61'
SH	21	(England) Tom Cairns
CE	22	(England) Zack Wimbush		(substituted on) 68'
WG	23	(England) Ben Hammersley		(substituted on) 31'
Coach:
(England) Rob Baxter

Player of the Match:
Harvey Skinner (Exeter Chiefs)
Assistant referees:
Karl Dickson
Sara Cox
Television Match Official:
Andrew Jackson

=== Final ===
20 June 2026
15:00

Northampton Saints (1)	26–17	(3) Exeter Chiefs
Try: Freeman 1' c Smith 31' c Hendy (2) 64' m, 67' c Con: Smith (3/4) 2', 32', 68'	Report	Try: Ridl 9' m Iosefa-Scott 39' m Jenkins 52' c Con: Slade (1/3) 52'

Twickenham Stadium
Attendance: 81,126
Referee: Matthew Carley

Team details

FB	15	(England) George Furbank (c)
RW	14	(England) Tommy Freeman
OC	13	(England) Tom Litchfield		(substituted off) 59'
IC	12	(Scotland) Rory Hutchinson
LW	11	(England) George Hendy
FH	10	(England) Fin Smith
SH	9	(England) Archie McParland		(substituted off) 11'
N8	8	(England) Henry Pollock
OF	7	(England) Tom Pearson		(substituted off) 57'
BF	6	(Australia) Josh Kemeny	(yellow card) 50'	(substituted off) 77'
RL	5	(England) Ed Prowse		(substituted off) 52'
LL	4	(England) Alex Coles
TP	3	(Scotland) Elliot Millar Mills		(substituted off) 48'
HK	2	(England) Curtis Langdon		(substituted off) 48'
LP	1	(England) Emmanuel Iyogun		(substituted off) 48'
Substitutions:
HK	16	(England) Craig Wright		(substituted on) 48'
PR	17	(Italy) Danilo Fischetti		(substituted on) 48'
PR	18	(England) Luke Green		(substituted on) 48'
LK	19	(South Africa) JJ van der Mescht		(substituted on) 52'
LK	20	(England) Tom Lockett		(substituted on) 77'
BR	21	(England) Callum Chick		(substituted on) 57'
SH	22	(England) Alex Mitchell		(substituted on) 11'
CE	23	(England) Fraser Dingwall		(substituted on) 59'
Coach:
(England) Phil Dowson

FB	15	(England) Olly Woodburn
RW	14	(England) Immanuel Feyi-Waboso
OC	13	(England) Henry Slade
IC	12	(Australia) Len Ikitau
LW	11	(England) Campbell Ridl		(substituted off) 77'
FH	10	(England) Harvey Skinner
SH	9	(Italy) Stephen Varney
N8	8	(England) Greg Fisilau		(substituted off) 77'
OF	7	(England) Ethan Roots		(substituted off) 47'
BF	6	(Australia) Tom Hooper
RL	5	(Italy) Andrea Zambonin
LL	4	(Wales) Dafydd Jenkins (c)	(yellow card) 56'	(substituted off) 68'
TP	3	(England) Josh Iosefa-Scott		(substituted off) 45'
HK	2	(England) Max Norey		(substituted off) 8'
LP	1	(Samoa) Scott Sio		(substituted off) 45'
Substitutions:
HK	16	(South Africa) Joseph Dweba		(substituted on) 8'
PR	17	(South Africa) Ethan Burger		(substituted on) 45'
PR	18	(Georgia (country)) Bachuki Tchumbadze		(substituted on) 45'
BR	19	(Wales) Christ Tshiunza		(substituted on) 47'
LK	20	(Italy) Ross Vintcent		(substituted on) 68'
BR	21	(Wales) Kane James		(substituted on) 77'
SH	22	(England) Tom Cairns
FH	23	(England) Will Haydon-Wood		(substituted on) 77'
Coach:
(England) Rob Baxter

Player of the Match:
(England) Henry Pollock (Northampton Saints)
Assistant referees:
Adam Leal
Anthony Woodthorpe
Television Match Official:
Ian Tempest

== Victory parade ==
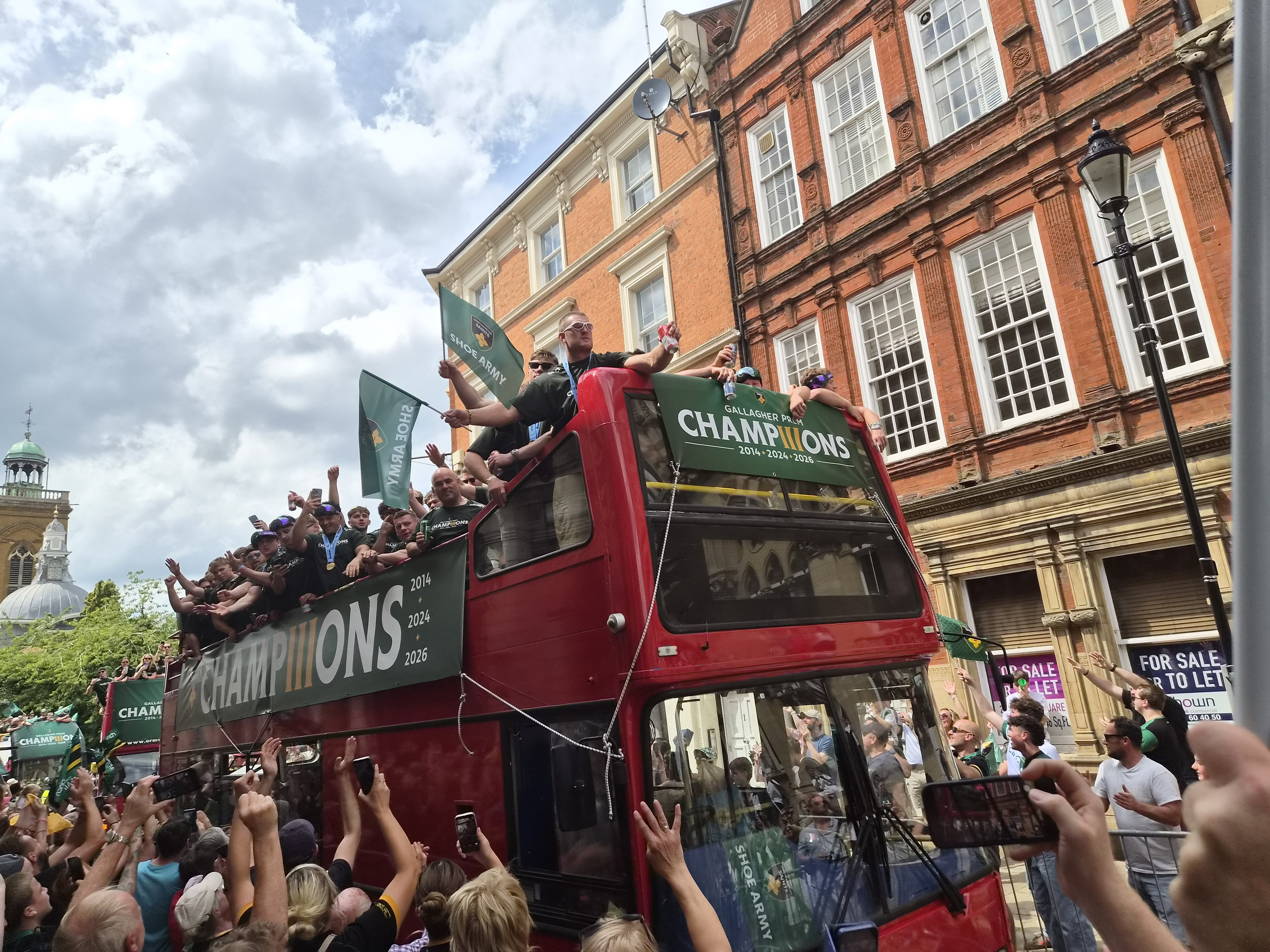
Northampton Saints team during Premiership Rugby victory parade in Northampton, 2026

Following Northampton Saints' victory over Exeter Chiefs in the 2026 Premiership Rugby final, the club held an open-top bus victory parade in Northampton on 21 June 2026. The parade departed from Franklin's Gardens at 14:00 BST and travelled through the town centre via Weedon Road, St James Road, Mare Fair, Gold Street, Mercers Row, George Row and Wood Hill before concluding at the Guildhall. Supporters lined the route to celebrate the club's third English championship title and second Premiership title in three seasons.

== Promotion/relegation play-off ==
At the beginning of the season, it was outlined that subject to meeting the eligibility criteria for promotion, the champions of the 2025–26 Champ Rugby season will play in a two-legged play-off against the team which finishes 10th in the Premiership table at the end of the regular season. The winner, based on aggregate score, would play in the Premiership for the following season. During the season, however, it was announced that there would be no promotion or relegation, and no play-off, as Prem Rugby moved to a franchise model for the upcoming season.

== Leading scorers ==
Note: Flags to the left of player names indicate national team as has been defined under World Rugby eligibility rules, or primary nationality for players who have not yet earned international senior caps. Players may hold one or more non-WR nationalities.

=== Most points ===
As of 20 June 2026

Rank	Player	Club	Points
1	(England) Henry Slade	Exeter	193
2	(England) Fin Smith	Northampton	157
3	(England) George Ford	Sale	143
4	(England) Marcus Smith	Harlequins	123
5	(England) Owen Farrell	Saracens	110
6	(England) Billy Searle	Leicester	109
7	(Scotland) Finn Russell	Bath	107
8	(England) Noah Caluori	Saracens	90
8	(England) Tommy Freeman	Northampton	90
10	(Scotland) Fergus Burke	Saracens	75

=== Most tries ===
As of 20 June 2026

Rank	Player	Club	Tries
1	(England) Noah Caluori	Saracens	18
1	(England) Tommy Freeman	Northampton	18
3	(England) Henry Arundell	Bath	13
4	(England) George Hendy	Northampton	12
4	(England) Tom O'Flaherty	Sale	12
4	(Fiji) Kalaveti Ravouvou	Bristol	12
7	(England) Immanuel Feyi-Waboso	Exeter	10
8	(England) Adam Radwan	Leicester	9
8	(England) Tom Roebuck	Sale	9
10	(England) Jamie Blamire	Leicester	8
10	(Wales) Gabriel Hamer-Webb	Leicester	8
10	(England) Gabriel Oghre	Bristol	8

== Discipline ==
=== Citings/bans ===
Player/Coach	Match (Note: The club of the cited player or coach is listed in bold italics.)	Citing date	Law breached	Result	Ref
(England) Josh Hodge	Northampton vs. **Exeter** (28 September 2025)	30 September 2025	9.13 – Dangerous Tackling (Red card)	3-match ban (Note: The ban is reduced by one match, subject to the player's completion of the World Rugby Coaching Intervention Programme.)	
(England) Nathan Michelow	Newcastle vs. **Saracens** (26 September 2025)	1 October 2025	9.18 – Tip Tackling (Red card)	4-match ban	
(Wales) WillGriff John	Bath vs. **Sale** (3 October 2025)	7 October 2025	9.20(a) – Dangerous Charging into a Ruck (Citing)	3-match ban	
(Scotland) Tom Jordan	**Bristol** vs. Exeter (11 October 2025)	14 October 2025	9.13 – Dangerous Tackling (Red card)	4-match ban	
(South Africa) JJ van der Mescht	Newcastle vs. **Northampton** (17 October 2025)	21 October 2025	9.27 – 2 Yellow Cards (Red card)	Sending off sufficient	
(England) Luke Cowan-Dickie	Saracens vs. **Sale** (18 October 2025)	21 October 2025	9.13 – Dangerous Tackling (Red card)	Red card rescinded	
(Italy) Edoardo Todaro	Bristol vs. **Northampton** (29 November 2025)	2 December 2025	9.17 – Tackling a Player in the Air (Red card)	2-match ban	
(England) Charlie Clare	**Leicester** vs. Gloucester (19 December 2025)	22 December 2025	9.20(b) – Dangerous Play in a Ruck (Red card)	2-match ban	
(England) Joe Batley	**Bristol** vs. Newcastle (27 December 2025)	30 December 2025	9.20(b) – Dangerous Play in a Ruck (Red card)	2-match ban	
(England) Ollie Thorley	Newcastle vs. **Gloucester** (2 January 2026)	6 January 2026	9.13 – Dangerous Tackling (Red card)	3-match ban	
(England) Arthur Clark	Newcastle vs. **Gloucester** (2 January 2026)	6 January 2026	9.12 – Strike/Punch (Citing)	3-match ban	
(Scotland) Jamie Hodgson	**Newcastle** vs. Gloucester (2 January 2026)	6 January 2026	9.12 – Strike/Punch (Citing)	1-match ban	
(England) Campbell Ridl	Bath vs. **Exeter** (3 January 2026)	6 January 2026	9.17 – Tackling a Player in the Air (Red card)	2-match ban	
(Samoa) Scott Sio	**Exeter** vs. Sale (21 March 2026)	24 March 2026	9.13 – Dangerous Tackling (Citing)	Citing dismissed	
(England) Oliver Leatherbarrow	Leicester vs. **Newcastle** (18 April 2026)	21 April 2026	9.20(e) – Dangerous Play in a Ruck (Red card)	3-match ban	
(England) Ethan Roots	Gloucester vs. **Exeter** (26 April 2026)	29 April 2026	9.12 – Strike/Punch (Red card)	3-match ban	
(Australia) Izaia Perese	**Leicester** vs. Northampton (9 May 2026)	12 May 2026	9.13 – Dangerous Tackling (Red card)	3-match ban	
(Ireland) Quinn Roux	Exeter vs. **Bath** (10 May 2026)	12 May 2026	9.13 – Dangerous Tackling (Red card)	3-match ban	
(England) Joe Batley	**Bristol** vs. Saracens (9 May 2026)	12 May 2026	9.20(a) – Dangerous Play in a Ruck (Citing)	Citing dismissed	
(England) Tom Dunn	**Bath** vs. Newcastle (16 May 2026)	19 May 2026	9.13 – Dangerous Tackling (Red card)	3-match ban	

== Awards ==
=== Player of the Month ===
The following players have received the Gallagher Premiership Player of the Month award during the 2025–26 season, as selected by a panel of media commentators, in addition to monthly public polls.

Month	Nominees	Club	Winner	Refs
October	(England) Immanuel Feyi-Waboso	Exeter	(Italy) Edoardo Todaro	
October	(England) Guy Pepper	Bath	(Italy) Edoardo Todaro	
October	(England) Henry Slade	Exeter	(Italy) Edoardo Todaro	
October	(Italy) Edoardo Todaro	Northampton	(Italy) Edoardo Todaro	
December	(England) Greg Fisilau	Exeter	(England) Ellis Genge	
December	(England) Tommy Freeman	Northampton	(England) Ellis Genge	
December	(England) Ellis Genge	Bristol	(England) Ellis Genge	
December	(England) George Hendy	Northampton	(England) Ellis Genge	
January	(England) Callum Chick	Northampton	(England) Billy Searle	
January	(England) Alex Coles	Northampton	(England) Billy Searle	
January	(Scotland) Cameron Henderson	Leicester	(England) Billy Searle	
January	(England) Billy Searle	Leicester	(England) Billy Searle	
March	(England) Alfie Barbeary	Bath	(England) Will Wand	
March	(Australia) Tom Hooper	Exeter	(England) Will Wand	
March	(England) Archie McParland	Northampton	(England) Will Wand	
March	(England) Will Wand	Leicester	(England) Will Wand	
April	(England) Noah Caluori	Saracens	(England) Fin Smith	
April	(Wales) Gabriel Hamer-Webb	Leicester	(England) Fin Smith	
April	(Fiji) Kalaveti Ravouvou	Bristol	(England) Fin Smith	
April	(England) Fin Smith	Northampton	(England) Fin Smith	
May	(England) Ollie Chessum	Leicester	(England) Will Wand (2)	
May	(England) Olly Hartley	Saracens	(England) Will Wand (2)	
May	(New Zealand) Josh Iosefa-Scott	Exeter	(England) Will Wand (2)	
May	(England) Will Wand (2)	Leicester	(England) Will Wand (2)	

== Broadcast coverage ==
The competition is being broadcast by TNT Sports for the thirteenth consecutive year. The 2025–26 season is the second of the new broadcast deal with PREM Rugby, under which all 93 matches will be shown live on TNT and Discovery+. In addition, seven select matches, including the Premiership Final, will be broadcast free-to-air on ITV over the course of the season.

This season will be the second to have the one-hour highlights programme, titled Gallagher Premiership Unleashed, which is aired on ITV4 each Wednesday at 7pm, recapping all of the fixtures held over the previous weekend. An abridged, half-hour version of the show is also shown on ITV1 every Wednesday at 11.45pm, while both programmes will remain available to view on demand via ITVX.

== See also ==
- 2025–26 European Rugby Champions Cup
- 2025–26 EPCR Challenge Cup
- 2025–26 Premiership Rugby Cup
- 2025–26 Champ Rugby
- 2025–26 United Rugby Championship
- 2025–26 Top 14 season
- 2025–26 Rugby Pro D2 season
- 2026 Super Rugby Pacific season
