= 2025 European Rugby Champions Cup final =

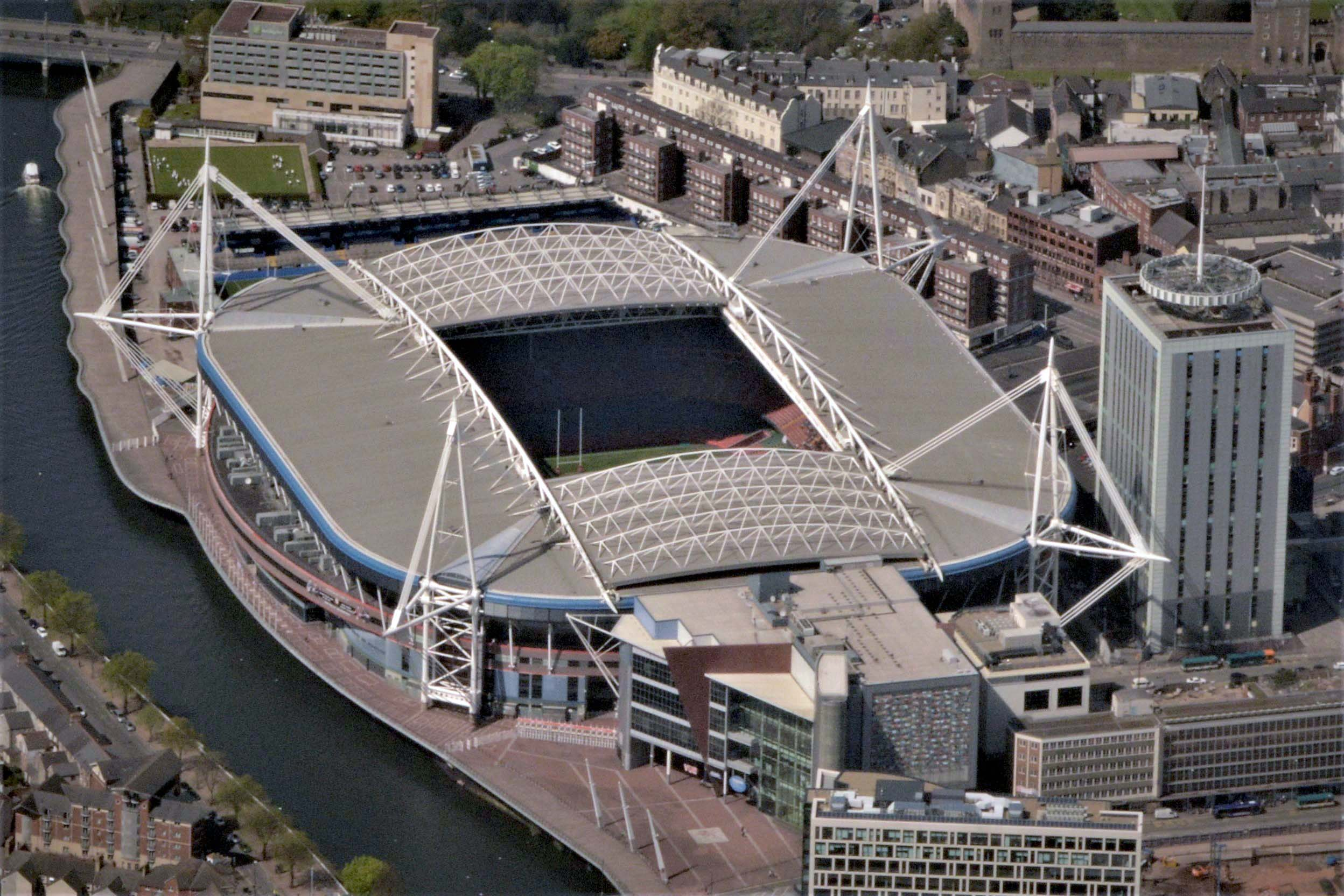
- The match took place at the Principality Stadium
- Event: 2024–25 European Rugby Champions Cup
Bordeaux Bègles	Northampton Saints
(France)	(England)
28	20
- Date: 24 May 2025
- Venue: Millennium Stadium, Cardiff
- Player of the Match: Maxime Lucu (Bordeaux Bègles)
- Referee: Nika Amashukeli (Georgia)
- Attendance: 70,225
- Weather: Roof closed

The 2025 European Rugby Champions Cup final was the final match of the 2024–25 European Rugby Champions Cup campaign, and the 30th European club rugby final in general. It was contested by Bordeaux Bègles and Northampton Saints on 24 May 2025.

The Millennium Stadium was the host venue, the sixth time the European final has been at the stadium, matching Twickenham Stadium's record of six finals.

Bordeaux Bègles won the final, beating Northampton Saints 28–20.

== Background ==
For Bordeaux, this was the first time that side had made a European final, and just their second major final (having only made a domestic final once), in their history. Northampton Saints, on the other hand, was making their fourth appearance in a European final, though their first since their 2014 Challenge Cup title, and their first Champions Cup final since 2011.

The two sides had only met once before in their history, coming during the 2020–21 European Rugby Champions Cup, where Bordeaux won 16–12 at Franklin's Gardens.

The two sides entered the final on different domestic forms; Bordeaux were sitting comfortably in the top 4 of the table in the 2024–25 Top 14 season, whilst Northampton Saints had already dropped out of the Premiership Rugby title race and therefore unable to retain their title. However, their European form had seen Northampton Saints only lose one game; a 45–35 loss to Stade Français in the pool stages. Whilst for Bordeaux, they entered the final as top seed after winning all their games in the pool stage with a bonus points before their run in the knockouts saw them progress to the final.

== Route to the final ==
Note: In all results below, the score of the finalist is given first (H: home; A: away).

(France) Bordeaux Bègles		Round	(England) Northampton Saints	
Opponent	Result	Pool stage	Opponent	Result
(England) Leicester Tigers	42–28 (H)	Round 1	(France) Castres	38–8 (H)
(Ireland) Ulster	40–10 (A)	Round 2	(South Africa) Bulls	30–21 (A)
(England) Exeter Chiefs	69–17 (A)	Round 3	(France) Stade Français	35–45 (A)
(South Africa) Sharks	66–12 (H)	Round 4	(Ireland) Munster	34–32 (H)
		Final standings		
Pool 1 Top 4: Team / P / W / D / L / PF / PA / Diff / TF / TA / TB / LB / Pts; (France) Bordeaux Bègles / 4 / 4 / 0 / 0 / 217 / 76 / +141 / 33 / 12 / 4 / 0 / 20; (France) Toulouse / 4 / 4 / 0 / 0 / 225 / 62 / +163 / 33 / 9 / 3 / 0 / 19; (England) Leicester Tigers / 4 / 2 / 0 / 2 / 134 / 149 / −15 / 20 / 21 / 3 / 0 / 11; (Ireland) Ulster / 4 / 1 / 0 / 3 / 102 / 163 / −61 / 15 / 24 / 1 / 0 / 5; Pool 3 Top 4: Team / P / W / D / L / PF / PA / Diff / TF / TA / TB / LB / Pts; (England) Northampton Saints / 4 / 3 / 0 / 1 / 137 / 106 / +31 / 20 / 15 / 4 / 0 / 16; (France) Castres / 4 / 3 / 0 / 1 / 105 / 86 / +19 / 13 / 13 / 2 / 0 / 14; (Ireland) Munster / 4 / 2 / 0 / 2 / 96 / 69 / +27 / 13 / 7 / 2 / 2 / 12; (England) Saracens / 4 / 2 / 0 / 2 / 91 / 71 / +20 / 11 / 9 / 2 / 1 / 11
Opponent	Result	Knockout stage	Opponent	Result
(Ireland) Ulster	43–31 (H)	Round of 16	(France) Clermont	46–24 (H)
(Ireland) Munster	47–29 (H)	Quarter-finals	(France) Castres	51–16 (H)
(France) Toulouse	35–18 (H)	Semi-finals	(Ireland) Leinster	37–34 (A)

== Match ==
=== Details ===
24 May 2025
14:45 BST (UTC+01)

Bordeaux Bègles (France) (1)	28–20	(3) (England) Northampton Saints
Try: Penaud (2) 5' m, 36' m Coleman 20' c Cazeaux 55' m Con: Jalibert (1/3) 21'; Pen: Jalibert (1/1) 28'; Lucu (1/1) 44'	Report	Try: Coles (2) 1' c, 40' c Con: Smith (2/2) 2', 40'; Pen: Smith (2/2) 24', 32'

Millennium Stadium, Cardiff
Attendance: 70,225
Referee: Nika Amashukeli (Georgia)

Bordeaux Bègles	Northampton Saints

FB	15	(France) Romain Buros		(substituted off) 20'
RW	14	(France) Damian Penaud
OC	13	(France) Nicolas Depoortère
IC	12	(France) Yoram Moefana		(substituted off) 72'
LW	11	(France) Louis Bielle-Biarrey
FH	10	(France) Matthieu Jalibert
SH	9	(France) Maxime Lucu (c)
N8	8	(Australia) Pete Samu		(substituted off) 67'
OF	7	(Argentina) Guido Petti
BF	6	(France) Mahamadou Diaby	(yellow card) 29' to 39'	(substituted off) 40'
RL	5	(France) Cyril Cazeaux
LL	4	(Tonga) Adam Coleman		(substituted off) 50'
TP	3	(France) Sipili Falatea		(substituted off) 40'
HK	2	(France) Maxime Lamothe		(substituted off) 62'
LP	1	(France) Jefferson Poirot		(substituted off) 58'
Substitutions:
HK	16	(France) Connor Sa		(substituted in) 62'
PR	17	(France) Ugo Boniface		(substituted in) 58'
PR	18	(Tonga) Ben Tameifuna		(substituted in) 40'
FL	19	(France) Pierre Bochaton		(substituted in) 50'
FL	20	(France) Bastien Vergnes-Taillefer		(substituted in) 67'
N8	21	(France) Marko Gazzotti		(substituted in) 40'
WG	22	(France) Arthur Retière		(substituted in) 20'
CE	23	(South Africa) Rohan Janse van Rensburg		(substituted in) 72'
Coach:
(France) Yannick Bru

FB	15	(England) George Furbank		(substituted off) 4'
RW	14	(England) Tommy Freeman	(yellow card) 35' to 45'
OC	13	(England) Fraser Dingwall (c)
IC	12	(Scotland) Rory Hutchinson
LW	11	(Australia) James Ramm		(substituted off) 2'
FH	10	(England) Fin Smith
SH	9	(England) Alex Mitchell
N8	8	(England) Henry Pollock
OF	7	(Australia) Josh Kemeny
BF	6	(England) Alex Coles
RL	5	(England) Tom Lockett		(substituted off) 60'
LL	4	(Fiji) Temo Mayanavanua		(substituted off) 29'
TP	3	(England) Trevor Davison		(substituted off) 59'
HK	2	(England) Curtis Langdon		(substituted off) 60'
LP	1	(England) Emmanuel Iyogun		(substituted off) 65'
Substitutions:
HK	16	(England) Craig Wright		(substituted in) 60'
PR	17	(England) Tarek Haffar		(substituted in) 65'
PR	18	(Scotland) Elliot Millar Mills		(substituted in) 59'
LK	19	(England) Ed Prowse	(yellow card) 43' to 53'	(substituted in) 29'
FL	20	(Australia) Angus Scott-Young		(substituted in) 60'
SH	21	(England) Tom James		(substituted in) 78'
CE	22	(England) Tom Litchfield		(substituted in) 4'
WG	23	(England) Ollie Sleightholme		(substituted in) 2'
Coach:
(England) Phil Dowson

Player of the Match:
Maxime Lucu (Bordeaux Bègles)

Assistant referees:
Andrew Brace (Ireland)
Andrea Piardi (Italy)
Television match official:
Marius Jonker (South Africa)
