= Callum Chick =

England international rugby union player

- Born: Callum Jason Chick; 25 November 1996 (age 29) Newcastle upon Tyne, England
- Height: 1.93 m (6 ft 4 in)
- Weight: 115 kg (18 st 2 lb)
- School: Gosforth Academy

Rugby union career
- Position: Number 8
Amateur team(s)
Years	Team	Apps	(Points)
2007–2014	Ponteland RFC		
2012–2014	Cramlington Rockets	5	(10)
Senior career
Years	Team	Apps	(Points)
2015–2025	Newcastle Falcons	171	(125)
2025–	Northampton Saints	12	(15)
- Correct as of 3 January 2026
International career
Years	Team	Apps	(Points)
2014–2015	England U16s		
2015–2016	England U18s		
2016	England U20s	9	(5)
2021–	England	2	(0)
- Correct as of 10 July 2021

Callum Chick (born 25 November 1996) is an English professional rugby union player who plays as a Number 8 or flanker for PREM Rugby club Northampton Saints.

== Career ==
=== Club ===
Chick joined Newcastle Falcons academy at just 12 years old, also playing youth rugby for amateur side Ponteland RFC. Chick signed his first professional contract with Newcastle Falcons at the conclusion of the 2014-2015 season. From there he went on to captain the Falcon's Rugby Sevens side. Chick made his Aviva Premiership debut on 28 October 2016, against Wasps, going on to make 15 starts in all competitions in the 2016-2017 season. On 24 February 2018, Chick scored his first Premiership try after coming off the bench, in an away win at Harlequins.

In May 2025, he signed for Northampton Saints ahead of the 2025–26 season.

=== International ===
Chick played for England's under-16 and under-18 sides. He captained the England under-20 team during the 2016 Six Nations Under 20s Championship. He was a member of the side that won the 2016 World Rugby Under 20 Championship and scored a try in the final against Ireland.

In June 2021 he was selected by Eddie Jones for the senior England squad and on 4 July 2021 made his debut against the United States at Twickenham.

== Honours ==
Northampton

- Premiership Rugby: 2025–26
