= Toby Thame =

English rugby player (born 2003)

- Born: 8 November 2003 (age 23)
- Height: 1.87 m (6 ft 2 in)
- Weight: 98 kg (216 lb)
- University: Durham University

Rugby union career
- Position: Centre
- Current team: Northampton
Senior career
Years	Team	Apps	(Points)
2023–	Northampton	20	(20)
- Correct as of 31 January 2026
International career
Years	Team	Apps	(Points)
2023	England U20		

Toby Thame (born 8 November 2003) is an English rugby union footballer who plays for Premiership Rugby club Northampton Saints. His preferred position is as a centre.

== Biography ==
The son of former rugby union player John Thame, he attended Durham University, where he studied finance. Thame came through the Northampton Saints youth system, signing with the club's Senior Academy ahead of the 2022-23 season.

Thame was selected to tour with the England national under-20 rugby union team in the summer of 2023. Following that, Thame played for the Northampton Saints first team in the 2023-24 season, making his debut in the Premiership Rugby Cup against London Irish, and scoring two tries against Cambridge in that competition in September 2023. He made his Rugby Premiership debut against Bath in the final match of the 2023-24 season.

Thame suffered an anterior cruciate knee ligament injury playing for Durham in British Universities and Colleges Sport (BUCS) Super Rugby in a game at Leeds Beckett University during the 2024-25 season, and missed a number of months of action, not returning until the pre-season with Northampton Saints the following year.

In August 2025, Thame followed in the footsteps of Saints players such as Dan Biggar, Alex Coles and Fin Smith as a winner of inter-squad Blakiston Challenge of 2.5km runs and sandbag carries, named in honour of former Saints captain Sir Arthur Blakiston. His performances for Saints that season included a try in a win against Sale Sharks in December 2025.
