= Emmanuel Iyogun =

English rugby union player

- Born: 24 November 2000 (age 25) Madrid, Spain
- Height: 1.90 m (6 ft 3 in)
- Weight: 119 kg (262 lb; 18 st 10 lb)
- School: Woodlands School, Basildon

Rugby union career
- Position: Prop
Youth career
- 2016: Southend RFC
Senior career
Years	Team	Apps	(Points)
2020–	Northampton Saints	101	(25)
2019–2020	→ Bedford Blues (loan)	12	(5)
- Correct as of 19 July 2026
International career
Years	Team	Apps	(Points)
2020	England U20	4	(5)
2024–	England A	3	(0)
2026–	England	1	(0)
- Correct as of 19 July 2026

Emmanuel Iyogun (born 24 November 2000) is an English professional rugby union player who plays as a prop forward for PREM Rugby club Northampton Saints and the England national team.

== Early life ==
Iyogun attended Woodlands School, Basildon and was scouted by Northampton Saints whilst playing for Southend RFC as a 15-year-old.

== Club career ==
Iyogun captained the Northampton Saints under-18s as a back row forward prior to being converted into a front row forward. He played in the RFU Championship on loan at Bedford Blues.

On 13 September 2020 whilst still a teenager Iyogun made his Premiership debut as a substitute and a week later made his first start in their European Rugby Champions Cup quarter-final elimination against Exeter Chiefs. He was named the club's Breakthrough Player of the Season in his debut campaign in 2019–20.

Iyogun had made 25 appearances by the end of the 2021–22 season, including a start in the Premiership semi-final defeat to Leicester Tigers. He signed a new long-term contract with the club in August 2022. In January 2023, he suffered an Achilles injury which ended his season.

In May 2024 Iyogun was part of the side that were eliminated by Leinster at the semi-final stage of the Champions Cup. The following month saw him come off the bench as a substitute during the 2024 Premiership final as Northampton defeated Bath to become league champions.

Iyogun signed a new contract with the club in January 2025. Later that year he started in the 2025 European Rugby Champions Cup final at Millennium Stadium which Northampton lost against Bordeaux Bègles to finish runners up. The following season saw Iyogun start in the 2026 Prem final as they defeated Exeter to regain their league title. Having made over 100 appearances for the club he signed a new long-term contract in October 2026.

== International career ==
Iyogun is eligible to represent both England, through residency, and Spain, through birth.

Iyogun represented England U20 during the 2020 Six Nations Under 20s Championship and scored a try in a defeat against Wales.

In July 2024 Iyogun was called up to the senior England squad for their tour of New Zealand after an injury to Joe Marler although he did not make an appearance. Later that year in November 2024 Iyogun played for the England A side in a victory over Australia A. In November 2025 he made more appearances at that level against All Blacks XV and Spain.

Iyogun was included in the senior England squad for the inaugural 2026 Nations Championship. On 18 July 2026, he made his Test debut coming off the bench as a replacement for Ellis Genge during an away victory against Argentina.

== Personal life ==
Born in Madrid, alongside his rugby career Iyogun is studying a joint-honours Law and Criminology degree.

== Honours ==
Northampton

- Premiership Rugby: 2023–2024, 2025–2026
- European Rugby Champions Cup runner-up: 2024–25
