= Fraser Dingwall =

England international rugby union player

- Full name: Fraser Andrew Dingwall
- Born: 7 April 1999 (age 27) Cambridge, England
- Height: 1.83 m (6 ft 0 in)
- Weight: 95.7 kg (211 lb; 15 st 1 lb)
- School: Bedford School

Rugby union career
- Position: Centre
- Current team: Northampton Saints
Senior career
Years	Team	Apps	(Points)
2018–	Northampton Saints	168	(155)
- Correct as of 18 June 2026
International career
Years	Team	Apps	(Points)
2018–2019	England U20	15	(15)
2024–	England	7	(10)
- Correct as of 15 November 2025

Fraser Andrew Dingwall (born 7 April 1999) is an English professional rugby union player who plays as a centre for Premiership Rugby club Northampton Saints and the England national team. He made his England debut in the 2024 Six Nations Championship and was part of Northampton Saints' Premiership-winning squad in the 2023–24 and 2025–26 season.

== Early life and education ==
Dingwall was born in Cambridge on 7 April 1999. His father Gordon enjoyed a long career with London Scottish and Newcastle Gosforth, while his older brother Euan also played rugby. As a small child, he was on the touchlines watching his father and brother play for Cambridge R.U.F.C., where he would later begin his own rugby journey.

Dingwall attended Bassingbourn Village College before Northampton Saints arranged for him to attend Bedford School through their Elite Player Development Group (EPDG) programme, where he served as Head of School. During his youth, Dingwall was also signed to Cambridge United FC's academy and had to choose between football and rugby when training schedules clashed. He ultimately chose rugby and first started playing at Cambridge RUFC.

During his final two seasons at Bedford, the school's 1st XV went unbeaten in 2016 and won the Champions Trophy. They reached the final again in 2017 but lost to Tonbridge School.

== Club career ==
=== Early years ===
Dingwall joined the Northampton Saints Academy at the age of 14 and progressed through the age-grade system, playing mostly at Under-18 level for Saints. He earned a call-up to the Northampton Wanderers, Saints reserve team, for the Aviva 'A' League final, where he won a winners medal as the side defeated Gloucester United to claim the title.

=== 2018–2020 ===
In October 2018, Dingwall made his professional debut for Northampton Saints, coming off the bench in a Premiership match against Leicester Tigers. In November 2018, Dingwall made his first Premiership start and scored a sensational try against Wasps in a 36–17 victory. In the same month, Dingwall signed his first senior contract with Northampton Saints. During the 2018–19 campaign, under head coach Chris Boyd's first season at the helm, Dingwall made 13 senior appearances and scored four tries.

The following season, 2019–20, Dingwall featured 23 times for Northampton and was nominated for the Premiership Rugby Cup's Breakthrough Player award. At the end of the season, he was awarded the Club's Young Player of the Season award.

=== 2020–present ===
Dingwall has been a consistent player for Northampton Saints, making over 20 appearances in three successive seasons. During the 2021–22 season, he featured in 23 of Northampton's 25 Premiership matches, scoring twice and assisting 10 tries as Saints reached the semi-finals. He followed this with 24 appearances in the 2022–23 campaign, scoring 7 tries and winning multiple awards despite a three-week suspension in January 2023 for dangerous play in a Champions Cup match against La Rochelle. Dingwall was named in the Premiership Rugby Team of the Season and was nominated for Try of the Season at the Premiership Rugby Awards for his finish in a fantastic team move against Gloucester. He also won both Northampton's Supporters' Player of the Season award and Try of the Season award.

Dingwall was a pivotal member of Northampton Saints' Premiership-winning campaign in 2023–24, featuring in 16 of the club's 20 league and knockout games. His performances were rewarded with a new contract in January 2024. He started at inside centre alongside Burger Odendaal in the Premiership Final as Northampton defeated Bath 25–21 to claim their first title in 10 years.

The 2024–25 season began with a setback as Dingwall suffered a knee injury in Northampton's third league game against Harlequins, keeping him out of action for almost two months. Although Saints did not have a strong season domestically, they reached the final of the European Rugby Champions Cup. Dingwall captained the side in the final, where Northampton lost 28–20 to Bordeaux Bègles.

In October 2025, Dingwall signed a new contract with Northampton Saints for the 2026–27 season and beyond. He played 21 matches during the 2025–26 season, culminating in Saints winning the Premiership title following a 26–17 win over Exeter Chiefs in the final.

Dingwall was appointed Northampton Saints club captain ahead of the 2026-27 season following the departure of George Furbank.

== International career ==
=== Youth career ===
Dingwall began his international career with Scotland's youth teams, qualifying through his Scottish father. He captained the Scotland Under-16 side at the Wellington Festival before switching his allegiance to England at Under-18 level, accumulating five Under-18 caps.

Dingwall scored a try for the England under-20 team against Ireland in the final round of the 2018 Six Nations Under 20s Championship as they finished runners up. He was included in the squad for the 2018 World Rugby Under 20 Championship and started in the final as England finished runners up to hosts France. He was chosen to captain England at the 2019 World Rugby Under 20 Championship and scored a try against Wales to secure fifth place.

=== Senior career ===
Dingwall received his first call-up to the senior England squad on 20 January 2020 for the 2020 Six Nations Championship, though he did not make his debut during the competition. He was subsequently called up to England training squads for the Autumn Nations Cup and was included in the squad to tour Australia in 2022. Dingwall was called into ten England camps before winning his first cap.

On 17 January 2024, Dingwall was called up to the senior England squad for the 2024 Six Nations Championship, alongside six of his Northampton Saints teammates. He made his England debut on 3 February 2024, starting at inside centre in a 27–24 victory against Italy at the Stadio Olimpico. A week later, on 10 February 2024, he scored his maiden Test try against Wales at Twickenham in the 63rd minute in the left corner to draw England within one point before George Ford's penalty sealed a 16–14 victory. Dingwall later reflected on the experience: "It's all bit of a blur but the emotions that ran through me after were crazy, everything came out of me".

His second international try was scored in a 33–19 victory against New Zealand in the 2025 Autumn Nations Series.

== Career statistics ==
=== List of international tries ===
as of 21 February 2026

No.	Date	Venue	Opponent	Score	Result	Competition	Ref.
1	10 February 2024	Twickenham Stadium, London, England	Wales	13–14	16–14	2024 Six Nations Championship	
2	15 November 2025	Twickenham Stadium, London, England	New Zealand	23–12	33–19	2025 Autumn Nations Series	
3	21 February 2026	Twickenham Stadium, London, England	Ireland	5–22	21–42	2026 Six Nations Championship	

== Honours ==
Northampton

- Premiership Rugby: 2023–24, 2025–26
- Premiership Rugby Cup: 2018–19
- European Rugby Champions Cup runner-up: 2024–25

== Personal life ==
Dingwall has been studying health sciences part-time at the Open University.
