= Tom Lockett =

English rugby union player (born 2002)

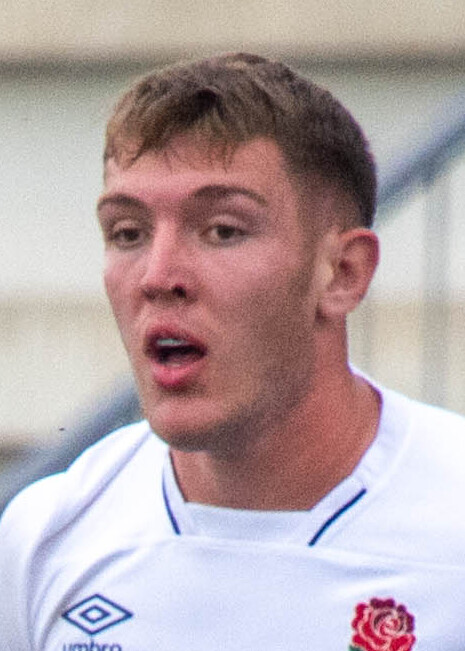
- Born: 6 October 2002 (age 24) Colchester, England
- Height: 2.01 m (6 ft 7 in)
- Weight: 112 kg (247 lb)
- School: Colchester Royal Grammar School

Rugby union career
- Position: Lock
- Current team: Northampton Saints
Senior career
Years	Team	Apps	(Points)
2021–	Northampton Saints	49	(25)
2022–2024	→ Bedford Blues (loan)	17	(5)
- Correct as of 3 January 2026
International career
Years	Team	Apps	(Points)
2022	England U20	7	(5)
2025–	England A	1	(0)
- Correct as of 23 February 2025

Tom Lockett (born 6 October 2002) is an English professional rugby union footballer who plays as a second row forward for Premiership Rugby club Northampton Saints.

== Early life ==
Lockett was educated at Colchester Royal Grammar School. He was a member of the Colchester United football academy before joining Northampton Saints aged 16 years-old.

== Club career ==
Lockett became a member of the senior academy at Northampton Saints ahead of the 2021-2022 season. He played on loan for Bedford Blues in the RFU Championship. He made his senior club debut for Northampton against London Irish in the Premiership Rugby Cup in November 2021.

Lockett made his Premiership debut against Sale Sharks in October 2023, and scored the match-winning try against RC Toulon in the Champions Cup in December 2023. He signed a new contract with Northampton in February 2024.

Lockett scored a try during a 2024–25 Champions Cup pool stage defeat against Stade Français. He featured as a replacement in the quarter-final against Castres and semi-final victory over Leinster. Lockett started in the 2025 European Rugby Champions Cup final at Millennium Stadium as Northampton lost against Bordeaux Bègles to finish runners up.

== International career ==
Lockett qualifies to represent Wales through ancestry and was a member of their under-18 squad. He switched to the nation of his birth and played for England U20 during the 2022 Six Nations Under 20s Championship.

In February 2025 Lockett started for England A in a victory over Ireland Wolfhounds. Later that year in June 2025 he was called up to a training camp for the senior England squad by coach Steve Borthwick.

== Honours ==
Northampton

- Premiership Rugby: 2023–24, 2025–26
- European Rugby Champions Cup runner-up: 2024–25
