= Archie McParland =

English rugby union player (born 2005)

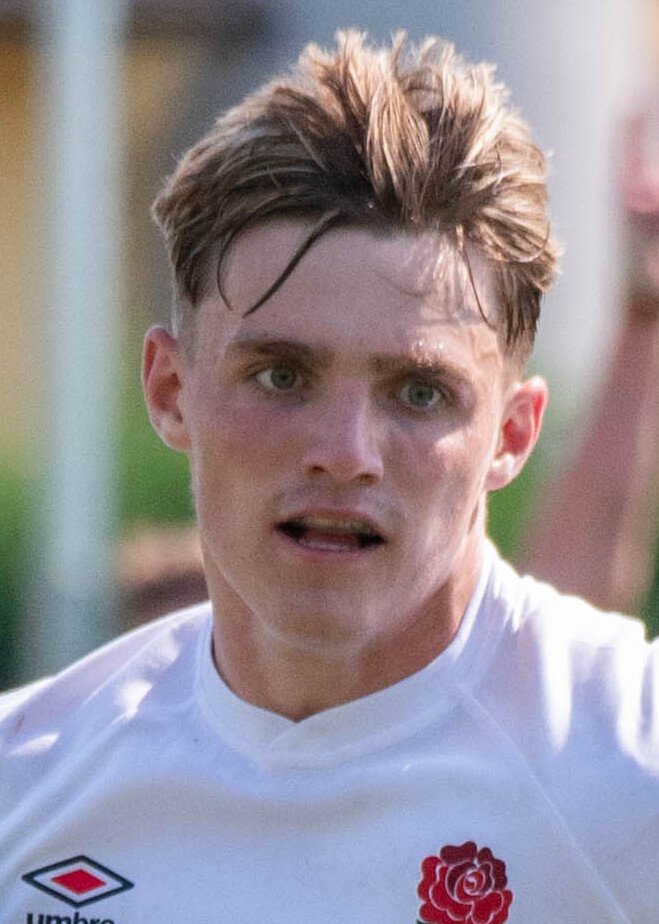
- Born: 17 February 2005 (age 21) Birkenhead, Merseyside, England
- Height: 1.83 m (6 ft 0 in)
- Weight: 89 kg (14 st 0 lb; 196 lb)
- School: Packwood Haugh School; Oundle School; Stowe School

Rugby union career
- Position: Scrum-half
- Current team: Northampton Saints
Senior career
Years	Team	Apps	(Points)
2022–	Northampton Saints	63	(100)
2023	→ Bedford Blues (loan)	3	(0)
- Correct as of 26 October 2026
International career
Years	Team	Apps	(Points)
2022–2023	England U18	9	(20)
2024–2025	England U20	11	(15)
2024–	England A	3	(0)
2026–	England	1	(0)
- Correct as of 14 November 2026

Archie McParland (born 17 February 2005) is an English professional rugby union player who plays as a scrum-half for PREM Rugby club Northampton Saints.

== Early life ==
Born in Birkenhead, Merseyside, McParland attended boarding school in Shropshire and then at Oundle School in Northamptonshire and then Stowe School. He joined the Northampton Saints academy at U13 level. Initially a fly-half or full-back, he switched to scrum half in 2020.

== Club career ==
McParland became the youngest player in the professional era to play for the Northampton Saints first-team when he played at the age of 17 years, 222 days old against London Irish in the Premiership Rugby Cup in September 2022. In March 2023, he was promoted to the senior academy at Northampton.

The following season he scored a hat-trick of tries in the competition in an 82–12 win over Doncaster Knights. He made his PREM Rugby debut in October 2023 against Sale Sharks. He spent time on loan at Bedford Blues in the RFU Championship during the 2023–24 season.

He signed a new long-term contract with Northampton in February 2025, having only missed one game in the Premiership that season. He scored a try in the 2025–26 Premiership Rugby semi-final victory over Leicester Tigers. McParland started in the 2026 PREM final as Northampton defeated Exeter Chiefs to become league champions. At the end of that season in May 2026, he was nominated for Prem breakthrough player of the year.

== International career ==
In 2023, McParland represented England U18. He played for the England U20 side which won the 2024 Six Nations Under 20s Championship. At the end of that year in November 2024, McParland made his first appearance for England A in a victory over Australia A.

In June 2025, McParland was named in the squad for the 2025 World Rugby U20 Championship and scored two tries in a game against Wales as England ultimately finished sixth. He was selected for the England A squad again in November 2025.

In May 2026, McParland was called up to a training camp for the senior England squad by coach Steve Borthwick, but was prevented from making a senior debut by a leg gash received in the PREM rugby final. Later that year in October, he was included in the England squad prior to the conclusion of the 2026 Nations Championship. McParland made his senior international debut on 14 November, appearing as a replacement in England's 78–15 victory over Japan at Twickenham.

== Honours ==
Northampton Saints

- Premiership Rugby: 2023–24, 2025–26

England U20

- Six Nations U20 Championship: 2024
