= George Hendy =

English rugby union player (born 2002)

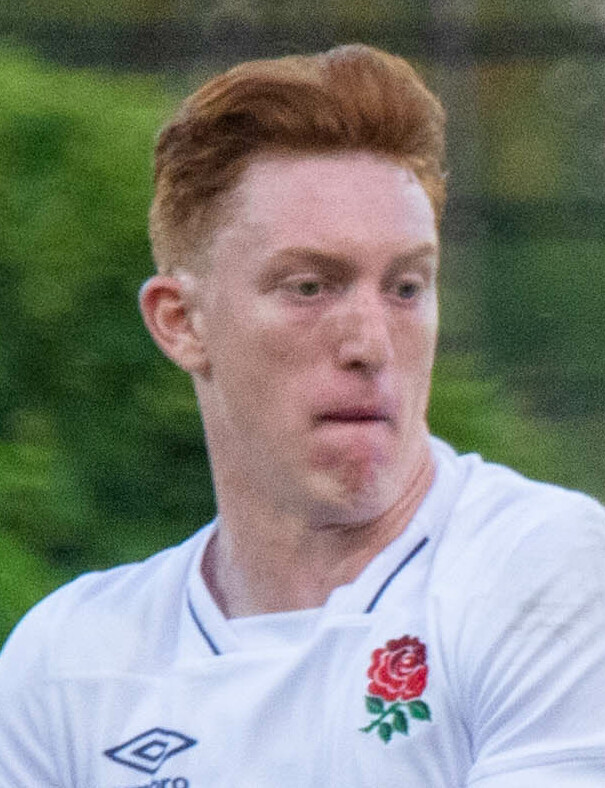
- Born: 15 October 2002 (age 24) Warwick, England
- Height: 1.90 m (6 ft 3 in)
- Weight: 94 kg (207 lb; 14 st 11 lb)
- School: King Edward VI School, Stratford-upon-Avon
- University: Loughborough University

Rugby union career
- Position: Full-back
Youth career
- Worcester Warriors
Senior career
Years	Team	Apps	(Points)
2021–	Northampton Saints	75	(200)
2022–2023	→ Bedford Blues (loan)	12	(20)
- Correct as of 20 June 2026
International career
Years	Team	Apps	(Points)
2022	England U20	7	(15)
2025–	England A	2	(0)
- Correct as of 27 December 2025

George Hendy (born 15 October 2002) is an English professional rugby union player who plays as a full-back for Premiership Rugby club Northampton Saints.

== Early life ==
Hendy attended King Edward VI School, Stratford-upon-Avon. He studied Geography at Loughborough University and competed for Stratford Athletics Club in track and field and played cricket to district level whilst representing Shipston on Stour.

== Career ==
Hendy started playing rugby at local club Shipston-on-Stour progressing through all their age groups until finally captaining their Colts team. During his youth career, He played at fly-half or centre, but progressed into senior rugby as a full-back and has also been utilised on the wing. Hendy was initially in the academy of Worcester Warriors before joining Northampton Saints. After playing for their under-18 side he joined up with the Saints’ Senior Academy, signing a professional contract in August 2021.

Hendy made his senior debut for Northampton against London Irish in the Premiership Rugby Cup in November 2021. He scored five tries in his first nine appearances. He started the first five league games of the 2023-24 season and scored four tries in eight appearances in all competitions in the opening months of the season. In April 2024, Hendy scored two tries as Northampton beat Munster to reach the quarter finals of the Champions Cup. He scored a try in their semi-final elimination against Leinster.

In June 2024, Hendy was named player of the match as Northampton beat Bath Rugby 25-21 in the 2023–24 Premiership Rugby final.

== International career ==
Hendy has been capped by England at under-20 level, and played in the 2022 Six Nations Under 20s Championship. In July 2022 he scored two tries during a 36-37 defeat against Ireland U20.

In February 2025, Hendy played for England A in a victory over Ireland Wolfhounds.

== Honours ==
Northampton

- Premiership Rugby: 2023–24, 2025–26
- European Rugby Champions Cup runner-up: 2024–25
