= Dan Frost (rugby union) =

English rugby union player

- Born: 24 April 1997 (age 29) Taunton
- Height: 180 cm (5 ft 11 in)
- Weight: 100 kg (15 st 10 lb)

Rugby union career
- Position: Hooker
- Current team: Bath
Youth career
- 2015–2016: Bath
Senior career
| Years | Team | Apps | (Points) |
| 2017–2018 | Taunton Titans | | |
| 2018–2021 | Cornish Pirates | | |
| 2021–2022 | Wasps | 25 | (35) |
| 2022–2025 | Exeter Chiefs | 57 | (95) |
| 2025– | Bath | 20 | (60) |
- Correct as of 3 August 2026
International career
| Years | Team | Apps | (Points) |
- England U18

Dan Frost (born 24 April 1997) is an English rugby union player who plays as a hooker for Bath.

== Biography ==
Born in Taunton, Frost played for the Taunton Titans and was a member of the rugby academy at Bath Rugby. He was an England U18 international.

Frost joined Cornish Pirates in 2018 before later signing for Wasps in May 2021. He made 25 appearances for Wasps but joined Exeter Chiefs in October 2022, following the dissolution of Wasps for financial reasons. After initially joining on a short-term contract, in June 2023 he signed a new two-year contract with Exeter. In December 2024, he scored two tries in a 39-21 defeat to the Sharks in Exeter's opening fixture of the 2024-25 Champions Cup campaign.

In February 2025, he agreed to rejoin Bath Rugby for the 2025–26 season. He made his Premiership Rugby debut for Bath as a replacement against Sale on 3 October 2025, in a 28–16 home victory for his side.
