= Josh Iosefa-Scott =

New Zealand rugby union player

- Born: 16 July 1996 (age 30) Hamilton, New Zealand
- Height: 194 cm (6 ft 4 in)
- Weight: 145 kg (320 lb; 22 st 12 lb)

Rugby union career
- Position: Prop
- Current team: Exeter Chiefs
Senior career
Years	Team	Apps	(Points)
2016–2020	Waikato	39	(10)
2021–	Exeter Chiefs	51	(45)
- Correct as of 2 March 2024
Super Rugby
Years	Team	Apps	(Points)
2019–2020	Highlanders	2	(0)
- Correct as of 10 April 2023
International career
Years	Team	Apps	(Points)
2024–	England A	1	(0)
- Correct as of 25 February 2024

Josh Iosefa-Scott (born 16 July 1996) is an England qualified, New Zealand professional rugby union player who plays as a prop for Premiership Rugby club Exeter Chiefs.

== Career ==
Iosefa-Scott represented Waikato in the National Provincial Championship and played 41 games for them overall between 2016 and 2020. He made his debut for the Highlanders during the 2019 Super Rugby season and earned a second and last appearance the following year.

In the summer of 2021 it was announced that Iosefa-Scott had signed for Exeter Chiefs and he made his debut at the start of the 2021–2022 season in a league fixture against Northampton Saints. In March 2023 he was a second-half substitute as Exeter defeated London Irish after extra time in the final of the Premiership Rugby Cup. The following month saw him score a try in the semi-final of the European Rugby Champions Cup as Exeter were eliminated by holders La Rochelle.

Iosefa-Scott is eligible to represent England as his father is from London. In February 2024 he played for the England A side against Portugal at Welford Road.
