= Ollie Leatherbarrow =

Scotland rugby union player (born 2002))

- Born: 8 April 2002 (age 24) Macclesfield, England
- Height: 1.84 m (6 ft 0 in)
- Weight: 106 kg (234 lb)
- School: Kirkham Grammar School
- University: University of Exeter

Rugby union career
- Position(s): Number 8, Flanker
- Current team: Newcastle Red Bulls
Senior career
Years	Team	Apps	(Points)
2021–2023	Exeter Chiefs	3	(0)
2023–	Newcastle Red Bulls	44	(30)
- Correct as of 18 November 2026
International career
Years	Team	Apps	(Points)
2021-2022	Scotland U20	7	(0)
2026	Scotland	1	(0)
- Correct as of 18 November 2026

Ollie Leatherbarrow (born 8 April 2002) is a Scottish professional rugby union player who plays for English PREM Rugby club Newcastle Red Bulls. His position is number 8.

== Early and personal life ==
Leatherbarrow was educated at Kirkham Grammar School and graduated with a degree in economics from the University of Exeter. His older brother, Teddy Leatherbarrow, has also been a professional rugby union player. Their mother is a teacher.

== Club career ==
Born in Macclesfield, Leatherbarrow played at under-16 and under-18 level for Sale Sharks prior to making the decision to study full-time at University. While playing for the University of Exeter, mostly operating at number 8, he became captain of the first-XV, and was part of the team that won back-to-back British Universities and Colleges Sport (BUCS) Super Rugby titles in his final two years. While in Devon, Leatherbarrow also signed to play and train with Exeter Chiefs, making appearances for the club in the Premiership Rugby Cup. He joined Newcastle Falcons in 2023, ahead of the 2023-24 season, initially signing a two-year contract. He signed a new contract with the club, now called Newcastle Red Bulls, during the 2025-26 season, having made 28 appearances for the club. At the start of the 2026-27 season, he was a try-scorer in the European Challenge Cup against Scarlets.

== International career ==
Although born in England, he qualifies for Scotland through his grandmother, who is from Perthshire. He represented Scotland at youth-level from U16 through to U20. In October 2026, he received his first call-up to the senior Scotland national rugby union team ahead of the 2026 Nations Championship. He was named as a replacement for Scotland's match against Australia on 15 November, making his debut off the bench in a 15-12 Scotland victory.
