= Ethan Burger =

South African rugby union player (born 2000)

- Born: 23 May 2000 (age 26) Durban
- Height: 1.92 m (6 ft 4 in)
- Weight: 121 kg (19 st 1 lb; 267 lb)
- School: South African College Schools
- University: University of Pretoria

Rugby union career
- Position: Prop
- Current team: Exeter Chiefs
Senior career
Years	Team	Apps	(Points)
2024	Plymouth Albion (on loan)		
2024-	→ Exeter Chiefs	26	(5)

Ethan Burger (born 23 May 2000) is a South African professional rugby union footballer who plays as a prop forward for Exeter Chiefs.

== Career ==
Burger attended school at South African College Schools (SACS) in Cape Town where he matriculated in 2018.

After school, Burger was contracted to the Blue Bulls where he spent 3 years in their academy program representing the Bulls at U19 and U21 level.

Burger was a member of the University of Pretoria Tuks Rugby team winning the Varity Cup in 2022 and Captained the team to winning the Varsity Shield in 2024.

Burger joined Exeter Chiefs in October 2024 having played previously as a prop forward for university side Tuks Rugby in South Africa and the U19 side of the Blue Bulls in Pretoria.

Burger spent time on loan at Plymouth Albion during the 2024-25 season, his performances included a hat-trick of tries against Darlington Mowden Park R.F.C. in April 2025.

Burger made his debut for Exeter Chiefs in the Rugby Premiership on 11 October 2025 against Bristol Bears. He made his first start the following week in a 38-0 win over Harlequins on 19 October.
