= Alex Hearle =

English rugby union player

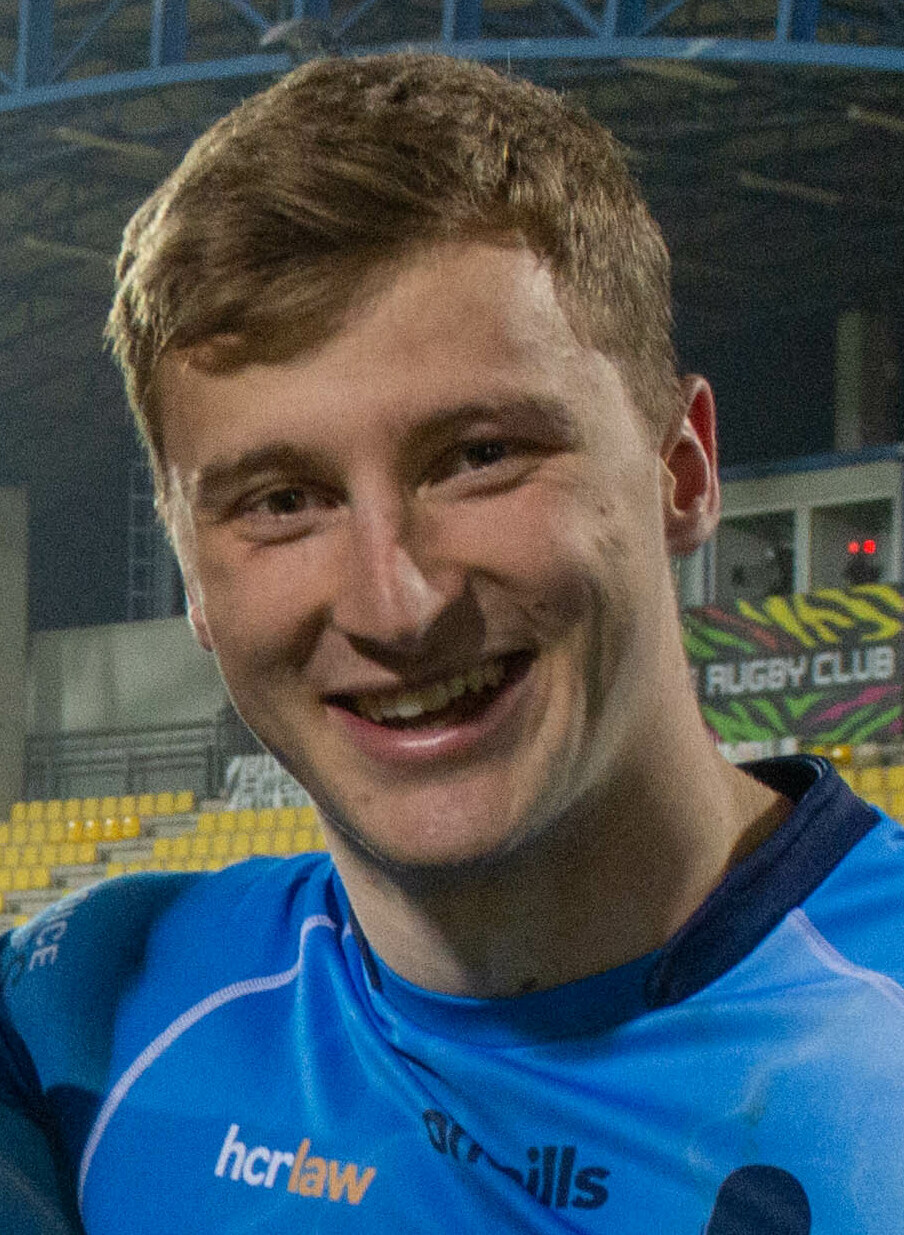
- Born: Alexander William Hearle; 8 November 1998 (age 28) Shrewsbury, England
- Height: 1.83 m (6 ft 0 in)
- Weight: 94 kg (207 lb; 14 st 11 lb)
- School: Shrewsbury College

Rugby union career
- Position: Wing/Centre
- Current team: Newcastle Red Bulls
Senior career
Years	Team	Apps	(Points)
2016–2022	Worcester Warriors	37	(45)
2018–2019	→ Birmingham Moseley	()	(10)
2022–2024	Gloucester	21	(5)
2024–	Newcastle Red Bulls	26	(40)
- Correct as of 29 September 2025

Alex Hearle (born 8 November 1998) is an English rugby union player who plays for Newcastle Red Bulls in the Premiership Rugby.

Hearle was called into Worcester Warriors first-team action while he was still at Shrewsbury College as he came off the bench to play against Wasps in the Anglo-Welsh Cup at the Ricoh Arena in 2016.

He was soon named in the Warriors Senior Academy ahead of the 2017/18 campaign and made two more appearances for the first-team that season, as well as impressing for Worcester Cavaliers in the Premiership Rugby A League. Hearle spent most of the 2018–19 season on loan at Birmingham Moseley, helping them to secure their National League 1 status.

He impressed with his pace and strength playing for Cavaliers in their Premiership Rugby Shield campaign and was involved in Warriors' matchday squads three times against Saracens during the 2018–19 season - featuring once as a replacement in the Premiership Rugby Cup semi-final at Sixways Stadium.

His first senior try came as a replacement for Dean Hammond in the Premiership Rugby Cup victory over Leicester Tigers in the opening match of the 2019–20 season.

On 14 May 2020, Hearle signed his first professional contract to stay with the Warriors, thus promoted to the senior squad from the 2020–21 season. He then made his Premiership debut at Exeter Chiefs in August 2020, after recovering from ankle injury which required surgery and had him sidelined for six months.

On 17 April 2021, Hearle scored his first Premiership try in a match against Harlequins to earn Worcester Warriors a losing bonus point.

Due to the club entering administration all Warriors players had their contracts terminated on 5 October 2022. Following his release from Worcester, Hearle signed for local rivals Gloucester with immediate effect from the 2022–23 season.

On 20 February 2024, Hearle signed for Premiership rivals Newcastle Falcons, now known as Newcastle Red Bulls, on a two-year deal from the 2024–25 season. In November 2024, he scored a try against Saracens to help them to their first win over their opposition since 2009.
