= Tom Litchfield =

English rugby player (born 2003)

- Born: 20 April 2002 (age 24)
- Height: 1.86 m (6 ft 1 in)
- Weight: 100 kg (220 lb)

Rugby union career
- Position: Centre
- Current team: Northampton
Senior career
Years	Team	Apps	(Points)
2020–	Northampton	85	(85)
2022–2023	→ Bedford (loan)	6	(10)
- Correct as of 15 June 2026
International career
Years	Team	Apps	(Points)
2021–2022	England U20	10	(5)

Tom Litchfield (born 20 April 2002) is an English rugby union footballer who plays for Premiership Rugby club Northampton Saints. His preferred position is as a centre.

== Biography ==
Litchfield came through the Northampton Saints youth system, signing with the club's Senior Academy ahead of the 2020-21 season. In December 2024, Litchfield signed a new multi-year contract with Director of Rugby Phil Dowson saying his "His differential is his physicality, his ability to get us over the gain-line in tough situations, and he does that with a really strong attitude, We're really pleased with how he keeps improving and showing us what he's capable of."

== Honours ==
Northampton

- Premiership Rugby: 2023–24, 2025–26
- European Rugby Champions Cup runner-up: 2024–25
