= Ed Prowse =

English rugby union player

- Full name: Edward Prowse
- Born: October 27, 2000 (age 26)
- Height: 1.93 m (6 ft 4 in)
- Weight: 123 kg (271 lb)

Rugby union career
- Position: Lock
- Current team: Northampton Saints
Youth career
- -: Northampton Saints
Senior career
| Years | Team | Apps | (Points) |
| 2022– | Northampton Saints | | |
- Correct as of 11 July 2026

Edward Prowse (born 27 October 2000) is an English rugby union player who plays as a lock for Northampton Saints in Premiership Rugby. He previously played as a tighthead prop before converting to the second row ahead of the 2024–25 season.

== Early life ==
Prowse came through the Northampton Saints Academy. After being released at the age of 18, he continued his development with spells at Coventry, Kettering RFC, Loughborough University and Bedford Blues before earning a full-time contract with Saints ahead of the 2020–21 season.

== Club career ==
Prowse made his senior debut for Northampton Saints in the Premiership Rugby Cup against Saracens in March 2022.

He made his Premiership Rugby debut in the final league match of the 2022–23 season before featuring three more times during Saints' Premiership title-winning 2023–24 campaign.

Ahead of the 2024–25 season, Prowse converted from tighthead prop to lock, becoming a regular member of the first-team squad. He made 11 appearances during the campaign, including featuring in the 2025 European Rugby Champions Cup final, and captained Northampton Saints for the first time in the club's final Premiership match of the season against Gloucester.

In January 2026, Prowse signed a new contract with Northampton Saints after establishing himself as a first-team regular.

== Playing style ==
Originally a tighthead prop, Prowse was converted into a lock ahead of the 2024–25 season. He is known for his physicality, work rate, ball-carrying ability and defensive contribution.
