= Adam Brocklebank =

English rugby union player

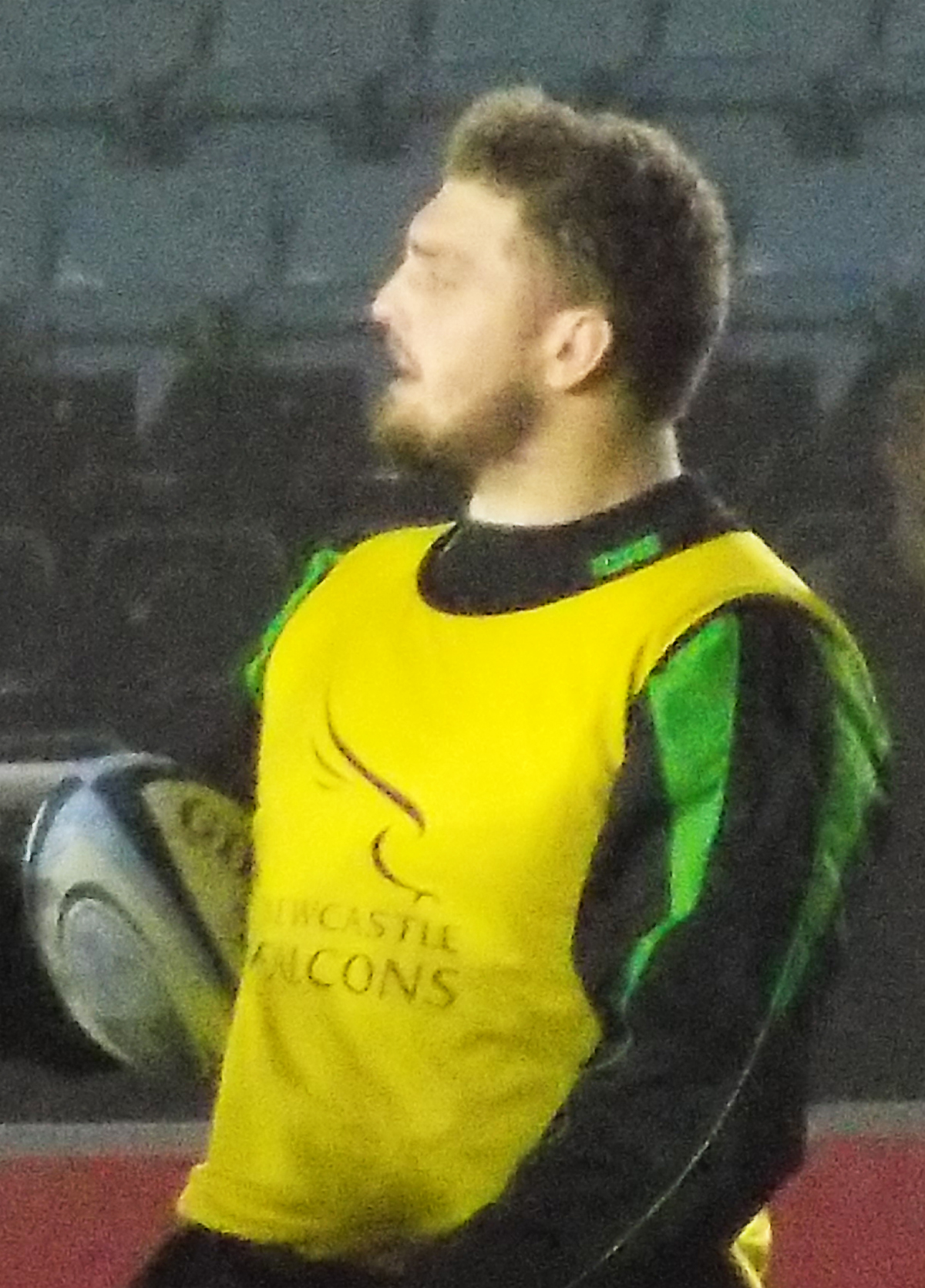
- Brocklebank warming up for Newcastle, November 2018
- Born: Adam Thomas Brocklebank; 6 September 1998 (age 28) Ormskirk, England
- Height: 1.88 m (6 ft 2 in)
- Weight: 125 kg (19 st 10 lb)
- University: Durham University

Rugby union career
- Position: Loosehead Prop
Amateur team(s)
Years	Team	Apps	(Points)
- Ormskirk Rugby Club
–	Mysercough College		
Senior career
Years	Team	Apps	(Points)
2014–	Newcastle	133	(5)
- Correct as of 8 August 2025
International career
Years	Team	Apps	(Points)
2013	England Counties U18s		
2015	England Students	1	(0)
- Correct as of 14 December 2023

Adam Brocklebank (born 6 September 1995) is an English rugby union player for Newcastle Red Bulls in Premiership Rugby. His preferred position is as a Prop.

== Club career ==
Brocklebank was a late-comer to rugby, first showing interest into the sport at the age of 16. initially a back row, Brocklebank played his first games for Ormskirk Rugby Club and Myerscough College. After beginning his studies at Durham University, Brocklebank was spotted by Newcastle Falcons and represented the club's A-League team in 2014/15 before signing with the Falcons' senior academy the following summer. He was awarded a senior contract in February 2017, to begin the following season after the end of his degree.

In his new role as a prop, Brocklebank has represented both England Counties U18s and England Students. He made his first team debut during the 2016–2017 season.
