= Noah Heward =

English rugby union player

- Born: Noah Daniel Heward; 11 October 2000 (age 26) Redditch, England
- Height: 1.85 m (6 ft 1 in)
- Weight: 94 kg (14 st 11 lb)

Rugby union career
- Position: Full-back
- Current team: Bristol Bears
Senior career
Years	Team	Apps	(Points)
2019–2022	Worcester Warriors	27	(45)
2022-Present	Bristol Bears	5	(5)
- Correct as of 26 June 2023

Noah Heward (born 11 October 2000) is an English rugby union player.
