= Craig Wright (rugby union) =

English rugby union player (born 2004)

- Born: 31 May 2004 (age 22) Chelmsford, England
- Height: 183 cm (6 ft 0 in)
- Weight: 110 kg (243 lb; 17 st 5 lb)
- School: Felsted School

Rugby union career
- Position: Hooker
- Current team: Northampton Saints
Senior career
Years	Team	Apps	(Points)
2023–	Northampton Saints	26	(15)
2023–2024	→ Bedford Blues (loan)	9	(5)
- Correct as of 3 January 2026
International career
Years	Team	Apps	(Points)
2021–2022	England U18	4	(10)
2023–2024	England U20	10	(15)
- Correct as of 19 July 2024

Craig Wright (born 31 May 2004) is an English professional rugby union player who plays as a hooker for Premiership Rugby club Northampton Saints.

== Early life ==
Wright was born in Chelmsford and was initially a keen footballer before transitioning to rugby union in his teens. He attended Felsted School and played club rugby for Braintree Rugby Club.

== Club career ==
Wright made his Northampton Saints club debut during the 2023-2024 season, starting in the Premiership Rugby Cup at Ealing Trailfinders. He also spent time on loan at Rugby Championship side Bedford Blues that season.

Wright made his first appearance in European competition when he featured in a 2024–25 European Rugby Champions Cup pool stage game against Castres. At the end of that season he came off the bench as a second-half substitute during the 2025 European Rugby Champions Cup final which saw Northampton defeated by Bordeaux Bègles at the Millennium Stadium to finish runners up.

== International career ==
In April 2022 Wright scored two tries for the England under-18 side in a game against Wales. He played for England U20 at the 2023 World Rugby U20 Championship and scored a try in their last fixture of the tournament against hosts South Africa which England lost to finish fourth.

Wright was a member of the England side which won the 2024 Six Nations Under 20s Championship scoring a try against Scotland. Later that year he was included in the squad for the 2024 World Rugby U20 Championship and scored a try in their semi-final victory over Ireland. Wright started in the final as England defeated France at Cape Town Stadium to become junior world champions.

== Honours ==
Northampton

- European Rugby Champions Cup runner-up: 2024–2025

England U20

- World Rugby Under 20 Championship
  - (gold) Champion (1): 2024
- Six Nations Under 20s Championship
  - (gold) Champion (1): 2024
