= Alex Coles (rugby union) =

England international rugby union player (born 1999)

- Full name: Alexander Joel C. Coles
- Born: 21 September 1999 (age 27) Cambridge, England
- Height: 2.03 m (6 ft 8 in)
- Weight: 120.5 kg (266 lb; 19 st 0 lb)
- School: The Perse School
- University: Birkbeck, University of London

Rugby union career
- Position(s): Lock, Flanker
- Current team: Northampton Saints
Senior career
Years	Team	Apps	(Points)
2019–	Northampton Saints	140	(115)
- Correct as of 3 January 2026
International career
Years	Team	Apps	(Points)
2017	England U18	2	(0)
2019	England U20	10	(5)
2022–	England	22	(10)
- Correct as of 18 July 2026

Alexander Joel C. Coles (born 21 September 1999) is an English professional rugby union player who plays as a lock for PREM Rugby club Northampton Saints and the England national team.

== Early life ==
Whilst pursuing rugby, Coles studied BA Politics Philosophy and History at Birkbeck, University of London.

== Club career ==
Coles played rugby as a child at Newmarket and Shelford Rugby Club prior to joining the academy of Northampton Saints at the age of fourteen. In November 2018 he made his club debut for Northampton in a Premiership Rugby Cup match against Wasps and the following year scored his first try for the club against Timișoara in the EPCR Challenge Cup.

Coles started in the 2023–24 Premiership Rugby final as Northampton defeated Bath to become league champions. In May 2024, following an impressive season he was named in the Premiership Rugby Team of the Season for that campaign.

Coles scored a try during the 2024–25 European Rugby Champions Cup quarter-final victory over Castres. He also scored both of their tries in the 2025 European Rugby Champions Cup final at Millennium Stadium as Northampton lost against Bordeaux Bègles to finish runners up.

In January 2026, Coles scored three tries in a 66–21 victory against Harlequins. At the end of that season he started in the 2026 Prem final which saw Northampton defeat Exeter Chiefs to regain their league title.

== International career ==
In 2017 Coles played for the England under-18 team on their tour of South Africa. He represented the England under-20 team in the 2019 Six Nations Under 20s Championship and was a member of the squad that finished fifth at the 2019 World Rugby Under 20 Championship.

Coles received his first call-up to the senior England squad by coach Eddie Jones for the 2022 Autumn internationals. On 6 November 2022, Coles made his Test debut starting in a 29–30 loss to Argentina during the Autumn Nations Series.

Coles made his first Six Nations appearances as a substitute in victories over Italy and Wales during the 2024 tournament. Later that year he was included in the squad for their tour of New Zealand and played in both test defeats as England lost the series.

=== List of international tries ===
As of 4 July 2026

Try	Opposing team	Location	Venue	Competition	Date	Result	Score
1	France	Paris, France	Stade de France	2026 Six Nations	14 March 2026	Loss	48 – 46
2	South Africa	Johannesburg, South Africa	Ellis Park Stadium	2026 Nations Championship	4 July 2026	Loss	45 – 21

== Honours ==
Northampton

- Premiership Rugby: 2023–2024, 2025–2026
- European Rugby Champions Cup runner-up: 2024–25
