= Fitz Harding =

English rugby union player

- Born: George Fitzgerald Harding; 26 April 1999 (age 27) Kensington, England
- School: Wellington College
- University: Durham University

Rugby union career
- Position(s): Flanker, Number 8
- Current team: Bristol Bears
Senior career
Years	Team	Apps	(Points)
2020–	Bristol Bears	54	(35)
- Correct as of 8 April 2024
International career
Years	Team	Apps	(Points)
2025	England A	2	(0)

George Fitzgerald Harding (born 26 April 1999), known as Fitz Harding, is an English rugby union player who plays for Bristol Bears in Premiership Rugby.

== Early life and education ==
Although given 'George' as his first name, Harding has only ever been called 'Fitz'. He was educated at The Beacon prep school in Amersham, Buckinghamshire followed by Wellington College. He then studied history at Durham University (Hatfield College), where he initially "slipped through the net" and was only assigned a place in the fourth team of the university rugby club, but soon progressed to the first XV.

Harding was never a member of any Premiership rugby academy when he was younger and was also overlooked in trials for the Buckinghamshire representative side.

== Career ==
Harding made his Premiership debut against London Irish in March 2021. The name on the back of his shirt was accidentally written as "Fitz-Harding" by the club and he had to ask them to reprint it afterwards. By October 2023, Harding had made 52 appearances for the Bears since signing in 2020. He was named club captain for the upcoming Premiership season, taking over from Steven Luatua.

== International career ==
In November 2025, Harding was called up to the England A squad for fixtures against All Blacks XV and Spain. He came off the bench for his international debut against the All Blacks XV in a 14–31 England defeat at the Bath Recreation Ground on 8 November. A week later he captained England A to a 29–25 win against Spain in Valladolid.
