= 2026 Nations Championship Northern Hemisphere Series =

International rugby union tournament

The 2026 Nations Championship Northern Hemisphere Series was the second phase of matches (rounds 4–6) in the inaugural edition of the Nations Championship, a biennial international men's rugby union competition between the Six Nations sides, SANZAAR, Fiji and Japan.

The Northern Hemisphere Series took place between 6 November and 21 November, during the November International window. The matches replaced the traditional tours between the travelling SANZAAR, the leading Tier 2 nations in the Pacific Islands and Japan, and the Six Nation sides.

== Tables ==
The below shows the tables for the two conferences.

=== Southern Hemisphere ===
| Pos | Team | Pld | W | D | L | PF | PA | PD | TF | TA | TB | LB | Pts |
|---|---|---|---|---|---|---|---|---|---|---|---|---|---|
| 1 | South Africa | 6 | 4 | 0 | 2 | 232 | 97 | +135 | 34 | 14 | 4 | 2 | 22 |
| 2 | New Zealand | 6 | 4 | 0 | 2 | 204 | 163 | +41 | 31 | 22 | 5 | 1 | 22 |
| 3 | Australia | 6 | 2 | 0 | 4 | 177 | 171 | +6 | 27 | 26 | 4 | 2 | 14 |
| 4 | Argentina | 6 | 2 | 0 | 4 | 145 | 200 | −55 | 20 | 30 | 2 | 1 | 11 |
| 5 | Japan | 6 | 1 | 0 | 5 | 103 | 261 | −158 | 13 | 40 | 0 | 1 | 5 |
| 6 | Fiji | 6 | 1 | 0 | 5 | 102 | 258 | −156 | 14 | 38 | 0 | 0 | 4 |

Source: Nations Championship Rugby

In the event that two or more teams are tied on number of points, the tie is broken via:

1. Matches won
2. Points difference (total scored – total conceded)
3. Tries difference (tries scored – tries conceded)
4. Tries scored
5. Coin toss.

=== Northern Hemisphere ===
| Pos | Team | Pld | W | D | L | PF | PA | PD | TF | TA | TB | LB | Pts |
|---|---|---|---|---|---|---|---|---|---|---|---|---|---|
| 1 | France | 6 | 5 | 0 | 1 | 236 | 128 | +108 | 34 | 18 | 5 | 1 | 26 |
| 2 | England | 6 | 5 | 0 | 1 | 285 | 126 | +159 | 44 | 18 | 5 | 0 | 25 |
| 3 | Ireland | 6 | 5 | 0 | 1 | 195 | 135 | +60 | 29 | 20 | 4 | 0 | 24 |
| 4 | Scotland | 6 | 4 | 0 | 2 | 211 | 157 | +54 | 32 | 24 | 4 | 0 | 20 |
| 5 | Wales | 6 | 3 | 0 | 3 | 149 | 180 | −31 | 22 | 26 | 4 | 1 | 17 |
| 6 | Italy | 6 | 0 | 0 | 6 | 74 | 237 | −163 | 9 | 34 | 0 | 2 | 2 |

Source: Nations Championship Rugby

== Results ==
Northern Hemisphere teams hosted all the matches.

=== Round 4 ===
==== Ireland v Argentina ====
6 November 2026
20:10 GMT (UTC+0)

| (1 BP) Ireland | 42–12 | Argentina |
| Try: Keenan (3) 14' c, 29' c, 49' c Sheehan 24' c Prendergast 41' c Kelleher 54' c Con: Prendergast (5/5) 14', 25', 29', 41', 50'; Frawley (1/1) 55' | Report; Post-Match Report | Try: Carreras (2) 9' m, 45' c Con: Albornoz (1/2) 45' |

Aviva Stadium, Dublin
Attendance: 49,165
Referee: Luke Pearce (England)

| Ireland | Argentina |

| FB | 15 | Hugo Keenan |
| RW | 14 | Robert Baloucoune | | (substituted off) 59' |
| OC | 13 | Robbie Henshaw |
| IC | 12 | Stuart McCloskey |
| LW | 11 | Mack Hansen |
| FH | 10 | Sam Prendergast | | (substituted off) 55' |
| SH | 9 | Craig Casey | | (substituted off) 55' |
| N8 | 8 | Sean Jansen | | (substituted off) 47' |
| OF | 7 | Nick Timoney | | | (substituted off) 69' | (substituted on) 72' |
| BF | 6 | Ryan Baird |
| RL | 5 | Tadhg Beirne |
| LL | 4 | Joe McCarthy | | (substituted off) 57' |
| TP | 3 | Tadhg Furlong | | (substituted off) 55' |
| HK | 2 | Dan Sheehan (c) | | (substituted off) 36' |
| LP | 1 | Andrew Porter | | (substituted off) 57' | (substituted on) 69' | (substituted off) 72' |
Substitutions:
| HK | 16 | Rónan Kelleher | | (substituted on) 36' |
| PR | 17 | Tom O'Toole | | (substituted on) 57' |
| PR | 18 | Sam Illo | (yellow card) 60' | (substituted on) 55' |
| LK | 19 | James Ryan | | (substituted on) 57' |
| BR | 20 | Josh van der Flier | | (substituted on) 47' |
| SH | 21 | Jamison Gibson-Park | | (substituted on) 55' |
| FH | 22 | Ciarán Frawley | | (substituted on) 55' |
| FB | 23 | Jamie Osborne | | (substituted on) 59' |
Coach:
Andy Farrell

| FB | 15 | Juan Cruz Mallía | | (substituted off) 64' |
| RW | 14 | Bautista Delguy |
| OC | 13 | Justo Piccardo | (yellow card) 34' |
| IC | 12 | Santiago Chocobares | | (substituted off) 64' |
| LW | 11 | Mateo Carreras |
| FH | 10 | Tomás Albornoz |
| SH | 9 | Gonzalo García | | (substituted off) 52' |
| N8 | 8 | Pablo Matera |
| OF | 7 | Marcos Kremer | | (substituted off) 55' | (substituted on) 67' |
| BF | 6 | Juan Martín González | | | (substituted off) 66' |
| RL | 5 | Pedro Rubiolo |
| LL | 4 | Guido Petti | | (substituted off) 51' |
| TP | 3 | Francisco Moreno | | (substituted off) 51' | (substituted on) 67' | (substituted off) 77' |
| HK | 2 | Julián Montoya (c) | | (substituted off) 29' |
| LP | 1 | Boris Wenger | | | | | | | (substituted off) 64' |
Substitutions:
| HK | 16 | Leonel Oviedo | | (substituted on) 29' | (substituted off) 37' | (substituted on) 41' | (substituted off) 52' | (substituted on) 57' |
| PR | 17 | Mayco Vivas | | | (substituted on) 37' | (substituted off) 41' | (substituted on) 52' | (substituted off) 57' | (substituted on) 64' |
| PR | 18 | Joel Sclavi | | (substituted on) 51' | (substituted off) 67' | (substituted on) 77' |
| LK | 19 | Efraín Elías | (yellow card) 54' | (substituted on) 51' |
| BR | 20 | Juan Martín Scelzo | | (substituted on) 55' |
| SH | 21 | Simón Benítez Cruz | | (substituted on) 52' |
| FH | 22 | Gerónimo Prisciantelli | | (substituted on) 64' |
| CE | 23 | Lucio Cinti | | (substituted on) 64' |
Coach:
Felipe Contepomi

Player of the Match:
Hugo Keenan (Ireland)

Assistant referees:
Hollie Davidson (Scotland)
Morné Ferreira (South Africa)
Television match official:
Andrew Jackson (England)
Foul play review officer:
Matteo Liperini (Italy)

Notes:

- This was Ireland's fifth consecutive win over Argentina dating back to November 2017, a joint record for Ireland.
- Ireland retained the Admiral Brown Cup.

==== Italy v South Africa ====
7 November 2026
12:40 CET (UTC+1)

| Italy | 7–66 | South Africa (1 BP) |
| Try: Ruzza 61' c Con: Allan (1/1) 62' | Report; Post-Match Report | Try: Feinberg-Mngomezulu 8' c Van den Berg 15' c Marx (2) 19' c, 31' c Kolisi 22' c Willemse 24' c Louw 49' c De Villiers 72' c Hooker 80' c Con: Feinberg-Mngomezulu (9/9) 9', 16', 20', 23', 25', 32', 50', 73', 80'; Pen: Feinberg-Mngomezulu 5' |

Juventus Stadium, Turin
Attendance: 31,500
Referee: Eoghan Cross (Ireland)

| Italy | South Africa |

| FB | 15 | Mirko Belloni | | (substituted off) 36' | (substituted on) 42' |
| RW | 14 | Ange Capuozzo |
| OC | 13 | Paolo Odogwu |
| IC | 12 | Leonardo Marin |
| LW | 11 | Monty Ioane | | (substituted off) 23' | (substituted on) 34' |
| FH | 10 | Paolo Garbisi | | | | (substituted off) 61' |
| SH | 9 | Alessandro Fusco | | (substituted off) 61' |
| N8 | 8 | Lorenzo Cannone | | | | (substituted off) 54' |
| OF | 7 | Samuele Locatelli | | (substituted off) 61' |
| BF | 6 | Alessandro Ortombina | | (substituted off) 8' | (substituted on) 21' |
| RL | 5 | Federico Ruzza |
| LL | 4 | Niccolò Cannone | | (substituted off) 51' |
| TP | 3 | Simone Ferrari | | (substituted off) 48' | (substituted on) 72' |
| HK | 2 | Giacomo Nicotera (c) | | (substituted off) 48' |
| LP | 1 | Muhamed Hasa | (yellow card) 29' | | | (substituted off) 51' |
Substitutions:
| HK | 16 | Tommaso Di Bartolomeo | | (substituted on) 48' |
| PR | 17 | Danilo Fischetti | | (substituted on) 36' | (substituted off) 42' | (substituted on) 51' |
| PR | 18 | Ion Neculai | | (substituted on) 48' | (substituted off) 72' |
| LK | 19 | Enoch Opoku-Gyamfi | | (substituted on) 51' |
| BR | 20 | Ross Vintcent | | (substituted on) 8' | (substituted off) 21' | (substituted on) 54' |
| BR | 21 | Manuel Zuliani | | (substituted on) 61' |
| SH | 22 | Stephen Varney | | (substituted on) 61' |
| FH | 23 | Tommaso Allan | | (substituted on) 23' | (substituted off) 34' | (substituted on) 61' |
Coach:
Gonzalo Quesada

| FB | 15 | Damian Willemse | (substituted off) 59' | (substituted on) 61' | (substituted off) 72' |
| RW | 14 | Kurt-Lee Arendse |
| OC | 13 | Jesse Kriel |
| IC | 12 | Damian de Allende | | (substituted off) 57' |
| LW | 11 | Ethan Hooker |
| FH | 10 | Sacha Feinberg-Mngomezulu | | (substituted off) 61' | (substituted on) 72' |
| SH | 9 | Morné van den Berg | (substituted off) 51' | (substituted on) 57' |
| N8 | 8 | Jasper Wiese | (substituted off) 46' |
| BF | 7 | Pieter-Steph du Toit |
| OF | 6 | Siya Kolisi (c) | (substituted off) 46' | (substituted on) 61' | (substituted off) 72' |
| RL | 5 | Ruan Nortjé |
| LL | 4 | Lood de Jager | (substituted off) 46' |
| TP | 3 | Thomas du Toit | (substituted off) 38' | (substituted on) 41' | (substituted off) 46' |
| HK | 2 | Malcolm Marx | (substituted off) 46' |
| LP | 1 | Ox Nché | (substituted off) 46' |
Substitutions:
| HK | 16 | Jan-Hendrik Wessels | (substituted on) 46' |
| PR | 17 | Gerhard Steenekamp | (substituted on) 46' |
| PR | 18 | Wilco Louw | (substituted on) 38' | (substituted off) 41' | (substituted on) 46' |
| LK | 19 | Franco Mostert | (substituted on) 46' |
| BR | 20 | Cameron Hanekom | (substituted on) 46' |
| BR | 21 | Paul de Villiers | (substituted on) 46' | (substituted off) 61' | (substituted on) 72' |
| SH | 22 | Grant Williams | (substituted on) 51' |
| FH | 23 | Manie Libbok | (substituted on) 59' |
Coach:
Rassie Erasmus

Player of the Match:
Morné van den Berg (South Africa)

Assistant referees:
James Doleman (New Zealand)
Sam Grove-White (Scotland)
Television match official:
Brett Cronan (Australia)
Foul play review officer:
Mike Adamson (Scotland)

Notes:

- Samuele Locatelli (Italy) made his international debut.
- Monty Ioane (Italy) earned his 50th test cap.
- This was the most points South Africa had scored in Italy, surpassing their 63 points scored in 2022.

==== Scotland v New Zealand ====
7 November 2026
14:10 GMT (UTC+0)

| Scotland | 21–43 | New Zealand (1 BP) |
| Try: Ashman (3) 7' c, 25' c, 37' c Con: Russell (3/3) 8', 26', 38' | Report; Post-Match Report | Try: Sititi 3' m De Groot 15' c Lakai 19' m B. Barrett (2) 30' c, 50' c Moorby 48' m Aumua 67' c Con: McKenzie (4/7) 16', 31', 51', 68' |

Murrayfield Stadium, Edinburgh
Attendance: 67,130
Referee: Andrew Brace (Ireland)

| Scotland | New Zealand |

| FB | 15 | Kyle Rowe | | (substituted off) 52' |
| RW | 14 | Kyle Steyn |
| OC | 13 | Huw Jones |
| IC | 12 | Sione Tuipulotu (c) | (yellow card) 50' |
| LW | 11 | Jamie Dobie |
| FH | 10 | Finn Russell | | (substituted off) 63' |
| SH | 9 | Ben White | | (substituted off) 63' |
| N8 | 8 | Jack Dempsey | | (substituted off) 52' |
| OF | 7 | Rory Darge |
| BF | 6 | Matt Fagerson | | (substituted off) 63' |
| RL | 5 | Scott Cummings |
| LL | 4 | Gregor Brown |
| TP | 3 | Zander Fagerson | | (substituted off) 66' |
| HK | 2 | Ewan Ashman | | (substituted off) 66' |
| LP | 1 | Rory Sutherland | | (substituted off) 32' |
Substitutions:
| HK | 16 | Gregor Hiddleston | | (substituted on) 66' |
| PR | 17 | Pierre Schoeman | | (substituted on) 32' |
| PR | 18 | Will Hurd | | (substituted on) 66' |
| LK | 19 | Max Williamson | | (substituted on) 52' |
| BR | 20 | Josh Bayliss | | (substituted on) 63' |
| SH | 21 | George Horne | | (substituted on) 63' |
| FH | 22 | Tom Jordan | | (substituted on) 63' |
| FB | 23 | Blair Kinghorn | | (substituted on) 52' |
Coach:
Gregor Townsend

| FB | 15 | Beauden Barrett |
| RW | 14 | Will Jordan | | (substituted off) 53' |
| OC | 13 | Quinn Tupaea |
| IC | 12 | Jordie Barrett | | (substituted off) 66' |
| LW | 11 | Josh Moorby |
| FH | 10 | Damian McKenzie |
| SH | 9 | Cam Roigard | | (substituted off) 61' |
| N8 | 8 | Wallace Sititi | (yellow card) 32' | (substituted off) 57' |
| OF | 7 | Peter Lakai | (yellow card) 23' |
| BF | 6 | Tupou Vaa'i | | (substituted off) 72' |
| RL | 5 | Fabian Holland |
| LL | 4 | Scott Barrett |
| TP | 3 | Fletcher Newell | | (substituted off) 63' |
| HK | 2 | Codie Taylor (c) | | (substituted off) 57' |
| LP | 1 | Ethan de Groot | | (substituted off) 49' |
Substitutions:
| HK | 16 | Asafo Aumua | | (substituted on) 57' |
| PR | 17 | George Bower | | (substituted on) 49' |
| PR | 18 | Pasilio Tosi | | (substituted on) 63' |
| BR | 19 | Christian Lio-Willie | | (substituted on) 72' |
| BR | 20 | Anton Segner | | (substituted on) 57' |
| SH | 21 | Cortez Ratima | | (substituted on) 61' |
| CE | 22 | Timoci Tavatavanawai | | (substituted on) 66' |
| WG | 23 | Rieko Ioane | | (substituted on) 53' |
Coach:
Dave Rennie

Player of the Match:
Quinn Tupaea (New Zealand)

Assistant referees:
Andrea Piardi (Italy)
Jordan Way (Australia)
Television match official:
Olly Hodges (Ireland)
Foul play review officer:
Marius van der Westhuizen (South Africa)

==== Wales v Japan ====
7 November 2026
16:40 GMT (UTC+0)

| (1 BP) Wales | 28–21 | Japan (1 BP) |
| Try: Griffin 3' c Adams (2) 27' c, 68' c Rees-Zammit 37' c Con: Costelow (3/3) 4', 28', 38'; Edwards (1/1) 69' | Report; Post-Match Report | Try: Gunter 10' c Dearns 31' c Fukuda 75' c Con: Saitō (2/2) 11', 32'; Komura 75' |

Millennium Stadium, Cardiff
Attendance: 52,425
Referee: Paul Williams (New Zealand)

| Wales | Japan |

| FB | 15 | Blair Murray |
| RW | 14 | Louis Rees-Zammit |
| OC | 13 | Eddie James |
| IC | 12 | Max Llewellyn |
| LW | 11 | Josh Adams |
| FH | 10 | Sam Costelow | (substituted off) 66' |
| SH | 9 | Tomos Williams |
| N8 | 8 | Aaron Wainwright |
| OF | 7 | Jac Morgan |
| BF | 6 | Alex Mann | (substituted off) 70' |
| RL | 5 | Ben Carter | (substituted off) 59' |
| LL | 4 | Dafydd Jenkins |
| TP | 3 | Archie Griffin | (substituted off) 52' |
| HK | 2 | Dewi Lake (c) | (substituted off) 52' |
| LP | 1 | Nicky Smith | (substituted off) 52' |
Substitutions:
| HK | 16 | Ryan Elias | (substituted on) 52' |
| PR | 17 | Rhys Carré | (substituted on) 52' |
| PR | 18 | Tomas Francis | (substituted on) 52' |
| LK | 19 | Teddy Williams | (substituted on) 59' |
| BR | 20 | James Botham | (substituted on) 70' |
| SH | 21 | Reuben Morgan-Williams |
| FH | 22 | Dan Edwards | (substituted on) 66' |
| CE | 23 | Louie Hennessey |
Coach:
Steve Tandy

| FB | 15 | Kazuma Ueda |
| RW | 14 | Kippei Ishida |
| OC | 13 | Dylan Riley |
| IC | 12 | Samisoni Tua | (substituted off) 73' |
| LW | 11 | Inoke Burua | (substituted off) 9' |
| FH | 10 | Riku Kitahara |
| SH | 9 | Naoto Saitō | (substituted off) 52' |
| N8 | 8 | Jack Cornelsen |
| OF | 7 | Kanji Shimokawa |
| BF | 6 | Ben Gunter | (substituted off) 58' |
| RL | 5 | Warner Dearns (c) | (substituted off) 70' |
| LL | 4 | Harry Hockings |
| TP | 3 | Shuhei Takeuchi | (substituted off) 58' |
| HK | 2 | Mamoru Harada | (substituted off) 58' |
| LP | 1 | Yota Kamimori | (substituted off) 58' |
Substitutions:
| HK | 16 | Kenji Sato | (substituted on) 58' |
| PR | 17 | Sojiro Otsuka | (substituted on) 58' |
| PR | 18 | Opeti Helu | (substituted on) 58' |
| LK | 19 | Michael Stolberg | (substituted on) 70' |
| BR | 20 | Tiennan Costley | (substituted on) 58' |
| SH | 21 | Kenta Fukuda | (substituted on) 52' |
| FH | 22 | Shinya Komura | (substituted on) 73' |
| CE | 23 | Chisu Lee | (substituted on) 9' |
Coach:
Eddie Jones

Player of the Match:
Louis Rees-Zammit (Wales)

Assistant referees:
Christophe Ridley (England)
Angus Mabey (New Zealand)
Television match official:
Glenn Newman (New Zealand)
Foul play review officer:
Eric Gauzins (France)

Notes:

- Riku Kitahara (Japan) made his international debut.

==== France v Fiji ====
7 November 2026
21:10 CET (UTC+1)

| (1 BP) France | 54–17 | Fiji |
| Try: Gros 14' m Penalty try 21'; Falatea 32' c Grandidier-Nkanang 36' c Gourgues 58' c Attissogbe 63' c Ollivon 72'; Dupont 78'; Con: Gourgues (1/1) 33'; Lucu (5/5) 37', 60', 63', 73', 79' | Report; Post-Match Report | Try: Habosi 66' c Ravutaumada 75' c Con: Volavola (2/2) 66', 76'; Pen: Kuruvoli 24' |

Parc Olympique Lyonnais, Lyon
Attendance: 53,563
Referee: Karl Dickson (England)

| France | Fiji |

| FB | 15 | Théo Attissogbe |
| RW | 14 | Aaron Grandidier-Nkanang |
| OC | 13 | Kalvin Gourgues |
| IC | 12 | Yoram Moefana | (substituted off) 65' |
| LW | 11 | Louis Bielle-Biarrey |
| FH | 10 | Romain Ntamack | (substituted off) 34' |
| SH | 9 | Antoine Dupont (c) |
| N8 | 8 | François Cros |
| OF | 7 | Paul Boudehent | (substituted off) 46' |
| BF | 6 | Cameron Woki |
| RL | 5 | Mickaël Guillard | (substituted off) 58' |
| LL | 4 | Florian Verhaeghe | (substituted off) 58' |
| TP | 3 | Sipili Falatea | (substituted off) 46' |
| HK | 2 | Maxime Lamothe | (substituted off) 46' |
| LP | 1 | Jean-Baptiste Gros | (substituted off) 46' |
Substitutions:
| HK | 16 | Peato Mauvaka | (substituted on) 46' |
| PR | 17 | Jefferson Poirot | (substituted on) 46' |
| PR | 18 | Régis Montagne | (substituted on) 46' |
| FL | 19 | Charles Ollivon | (substituted on) 57' |
| LK | 20 | Tom Staniforth | (substituted on) 46' |
| BR | 21 | Esteban Capilla | (substituted on) 58' |
| SH | 22 | Maxime Lucu | (substituted on) 34' |
| CE | 23 | Émilien Gailleton | (substituted on) 65' |
Coach:
Fabien Galthié

| FB | 15 | Salesi Rayasi | | (substituted off) 45' |
| RW | 14 | Selestino Ravutaumada |
| OC | 13 | Iosefo Masi |
| IC | 12 | Vinaya Habosi |
| LW | 11 | Jiuta Wainiqolo |
| FH | 10 | Vilimoni Botitu | | (substituted off) 45' |
| SH | 9 | Simione Kuruvoli | | (substituted off) 45' |
| N8 | 8 | Nathan Hughes | | | (substituted off) 72' |
| OF | 7 | Kitione Salawa Jr. | | (substituted off) 55' |
| BF | 6 | Pita Gus Sowakula | | (substituted off) 49' |
| RL | 5 | Mesake Vocevoce | (yellow card) 22' |
| LL | 4 | Isoa Nasilasila |
| TP | 3 | Luke Tagi | | (substituted off) 58' |
| HK | 2 | Tevita Ikanivere (c) | | (substituted off) 61' | (substituted on) 72' |
| LP | 1 | Eroni Mawi | | (substituted off) 58' |
Substitutions:
| HK | 16 | Zuriel Togiatama | | (substituted on) 61' |
| PR | 17 | Peni Ravai | | (substituted on) 58' |
| PR | 18 | Inoke Ravuiwasa | | (substituted on) 58' |
| BR | 19 | Peceli Yato | | (substituted on) 49' |
| BR | 20 | Elia Canakaivata | | (substituted on) 55' |
| SH | 21 | Frank Lomani | | (substituted on) 45' |
| FH | 22 | Ben Volavola | | (substituted on) 45' |
| CE | 23 | Sireli Maqala | | (substituted on) 45' |
Coach:
Jake White

Player of the Match:
Antoine Dupont (France)

Assistant referees:
Damián Schneider (Argentina)
Katsuki Furuse (Japan)
Television match official:
Ian Tempest (England)
Foul play review officer:
Leo Colgan (Ireland)

Notes:

- Esteban Capilla (France) and Nathan Hughes (Fiji) made their international debuts.
- Frank Lomani (Fiji) earned his 50th test cap.

==== England v Australia ====
8 November 2026
15:10 GMT (UTC+0)

| (1 BP) England | 45–22 | Australia |
| Try: George 7' m Chessum 25' c Heyes 32' c Van Poortvliet 42' c Pollock (2) 54' m, 56' c Spencer 75' c Con: F. Smith (5/7) 26', 33', 42', 57', 76' | Report; Post-Match Report | Try: Jorgensen 39' c Daugunu 61' m Williams 73' c Con: Lonergan (1/2) 40'; Donaldson (1/1) 74'; Pen: Lonergan (1/1) 11' |

Twickenham Stadium, London
Attendance: 81,334
Referee: Pierre Brousset (France)

| England | Australia |

| FB | 15 | George Furbank |
| RW | 14 | Tommy Freeman |
| OC | 13 | Henry Slade |
| IC | 12 | Seb Atkinson | (substituted off) 64' |
| LW | 11 | Immanuel Feyi-Waboso | (substituted off) 41' |
| FH | 10 | Fin Smith |
| SH | 9 | Jack van Poortvliet | (substituted off) 75' |
| N8 | 8 | Ben Earl |
| OF | 7 | Ben Curry | (substituted off) 56' |
| BF | 6 | Ollie Chessum |
| RL | 5 | Alex Coles | (substituted off) 64' |
| LL | 4 | Maro Itoje (c) |
| TP | 3 | Joe Heyes | (substituted off) 64' |
| HK | 2 | Jamie George | (substituted off) 56' |
| LP | 1 | Fin Baxter | (substituted off) 56' |
Substitutions:
| HK | 16 | Luke Cowan-Dickie | (substituted on) 56' |
| PR | 17 | Ellis Genge | (substituted on) 56' |
| PR | 18 | Will Stuart | (substituted on) 64' |
| LK | 19 | George Martin | (substituted on) 64' |
| BR | 20 | Greg Fisilau | (substituted on) 56' |
| BR | 21 | Henry Pollock | (substituted on) 41' |
| SH | 22 | Ben Spencer | (substituted on) 75' |
| FH | 23 | Marcus Smith | (substituted on) 64' |
Coach:
Steve Borthwick

| FB | 15 | Tom Wright |
| RW | 14 | Max Jorgensen |
| OC | 13 | Isaac Henry | | (substituted off) 58' |
| IC | 12 | Len Ikitau |
| LW | 11 | Joseph-Aukuso Suaalii |
| FH | 10 | Declan Meredith | | (substituted off) 54' |
| SH | 9 | Ryan Lonergan | | (substituted off) 71' |
| N8 | 8 | Harry Wilson (c) |
| OF | 7 | Fraser McReight | | (substituted off) 64' |
| BF | 6 | Jeremy Williams |
| RL | 5 | Lukhan Salakaia-Loto | | (substituted off) 47' |
| LL | 4 | Josh Canham |
| TP | 3 | Allan Alaalatoa | | (substituted off) 47' |
| HK | 2 | Billy Pollard | | (substituted off) 56' |
| LP | 1 | Angus Bell | (yellow card) 32' | (substituted off) 64' |
Substitutions:
| HK | 16 | Josh Nasser | | (substituted on) 56' |
| PR | 17 | Isaac Aedo Kailea | | (substituted on) 64' |
| PR | 18 | Taniela Tupou | | (substituted on) 47' |
| BR | 19 | Rob Valetini | | (substituted on) 47' |
| BR | 20 | Carlo Tizzano | | (substituted on) 64' |
| SH | 21 | Tate McDermott | | (substituted on) 71' |
| FH | 22 | Ben Donaldson | | (substituted on) 54' |
| WG | 23 | Filipo Daugunu | | (substituted on) 58' |
Coach:
(Australia) Les Kiss

Player of the Match:
Henry Slade (England)

Assistant referees:
Nika Amashukeli (Georgia)
Jérémy Rozier (France)
Television match official:
Tual Trainini (France)
Foul play review officer:
Matteo Liperini (Italy)

Notes:

- Greg Fisilau (England) made his international debut.
- Fraser McReight (Australia) earned his 50th test cap.
- England retained the Ella–Mobbs Trophy.

=== Round 5 ===
==== France v South Africa ====
13 November 2026
21:10 CET (UTC+1)

| France | 21–19 | South Africa (1 BP) |
| Try: Grandidier-Nkanang 14' c Attissogbe 23' c Bielle-Biarrey 31' c Con: Lucu (3/3) 15', 23', 32' | Report; Post-Match Report | Try: Wessels 29' c Reinach 50' c Marx 71' m Con: Feinberg-Mngomezulu (2/2) 30', 51' |

Stade de France, Saint-Denis
Attendance: 80,000
Referee: Andrea Piardi (Italy)

| France | South Africa |

| FB | 15 | Théo Attissogbe |
| RW | 14 | Aaron Grandidier-Nkanang | (yellow card) 49' |
| OC | 13 | Kalvin Gourgues | | (substituted off) 57' |
| IC | 12 | Yoram Moefana |
| LW | 11 | Louis Bielle-Biarrey |
| FH | 10 | Antoine Dupont (c) |
| SH | 9 | Maxime Lucu | (yellow card) 39' |
| N8 | 8 | Grégory Alldritt | | (substituted off) 50' |
| OF | 7 | Cameron Woki | | | (substituted off) 70' | (substituted on) 79' |
| BF | 6 | François Cros |
| RL | 5 | Mickaël Guillard | | (substituted off) 50' |
| LL | 4 | Florian Verhaeghe | | (substituted off) 57' |
| TP | 3 | Sipili Falatea | | (substituted off) 50' | (substituted on) 70' | (substituted off) 79' |
| HK | 16 | Peato Mauvaka | | (substituted off) 50' |
| LP | 1 | Jean-Baptiste Gros | | (substituted off) 50' |
Substitutions:
| HK | 2 | Maxime Lamothe | | (substituted on) 50' |
| PR | 17 | Rodrigue Neti | | (substituted on) 50' |
| PR | 18 | Régis Montagne | (yellow card) 69' | (substituted on) 50' |
| BR | 19 | Charles Ollivon | | (substituted on) 57' |
| LK | 20 | Tom Staniforth | | (substituted on) 50' |
| BR | 21 | Esteban Capilla | | (substituted on) 50' |
| FH | 22 | Axel Desperes |
| CE | 23 | Émilien Gailleton | | (substituted on) 57' |
Coach:
Fabien Galthié

| FB | 15 | Damian Willemse |
| RW | 14 | Kurt-Lee Arendse |
| OC | 13 | Jesse Kriel |
| IC | 12 | Damian de Allende |
| LW | 11 | Ethan Hooker | | | (substituted off) 77' |
| FH | 10 | Sacha Feinberg-Mngomezulu | | (substituted off) 67' | (substituted on) 77' |
| SH | 9 | Morné van den Berg | | (substituted off) 50' |
| N8 | 8 | Jasper Wiese | (red card) 43' | (substituted off) 65' |
| BF | 7 | Pieter-Steph du Toit |
| OF | 6 | Siya Kolisi (c) | | (substituted off) 57' |
| RL | 5 | Ruan Nortjé |
| LL | 4 | Lood de Jager | (yellow card) 12' | (substituted off) 57' |
| TP | 18 | Thomas du Toit | | (substituted off) 36' |
| HK | 16 | Jan-Hendrik Wessels | | (substituted off) 36' |
| LP | 17 | Gerhard Steenekamp | | (substituted off) 36' |
Substitutions:
| PR | 1 | Ox Nché | | (substituted on) 36' |
| HK | 2 | Malcolm Marx | | (substituted on) 36' |
| PR | 3 | Wilco Louw | | (substituted on) 36' |
| LK | 19 | Franco Mostert | | (substituted on) 57' |
| BR | 20 | Cameron Hanekom | | (substituted on) 65' |
| BR | 21 | Paul de Villiers | | (substituted on) 57' |
| SH | 22 | Cobus Reinach | | (substituted on) 50' |
| FH | 23 | Manie Libbok | | (substituted on) 67' |
Coach:
Rassie Erasmus

Player of the Match:
Antoine Dupont (France)

Assistant referees:
Christophe Ridley (England)
Gianluca Gnecchi (Italy)
Television match official:
Matteo Liperini (Italy)
Foul play review officer:
Andrew Jackson (England)

Notes:

- Julien Marchand (France) was originally named at hooker but pulled out due to injury just before kick-off; replacement hooker Peato Mauvaka took his place in the starting line-up, while Mauvaka was replaced on the bench by Maxime Lamothe.
- South Africa originally named Ox Nché, Malcolm Marx and Wilco Louw in the starting line-up when the team was first announced on 9 November, but were replaced by Gerhard Steenekamp, Jan-Hendrik Wessels and Thomas du Toit when the team sheets were announced an hour before the game, with Nché, Marx and Louw dropping to the bench. Because of the late change, all six players wore the numbers they were originally announced as wearing.
- Peato Mauvaka (France) earned his 50th test cap.

==== Italy v Argentina ====
14 November 2026
12:40 CET (UTC+1)

| (1 BP) Italy | 14–19 | Argentina |
| Try: Ioane 4' c Penalty try 64'; Con: Allan (1/1) 5' | Report; Post-Match Report | Try: Bernasconi 38' c Isgró 54' m Carreras 59' c Con: Albornoz (2/3) 39', 60' |

Stadio Luigi Ferraris, Genoa
Attendance: 24,615
Referee: Nika Amashukeli (Georgia)

| Italy | Argentina (Note: The Argentina kit was an exact replica of the model worn by the Argentina football team during the 1986 FIFA World Cup, where Argentina became world champions for second time.) |

| FB | 15 | Tommaso Allan |
| RW | 14 | Ange Capuozzo |
| OC | 13 | Paolo Odogwu | | (substituted off) 70' |
| IC | 12 | Leonardo Marin |
| LW | 11 | Monty Ioane |
| FH | 10 | Paolo Garbisi |
| SH | 9 | Stephen Varney | | (substituted off) 76' |
| N8 | 8 | Lorenzo Cannone |
| OF | 7 | Manuel Zuliani |
| BF | 6 | Ross Vintcent |
| RL | 5 | Federico Ruzza | | (substituted off) 76' |
| LL | 4 | Niccolò Cannone | | (substituted off) 56' |
| TP | 3 | Simone Ferrari | | (substituted off) 57' |
| HK | 2 | Giacomo Nicotera (c) | | (substituted off) 56' |
| LP | 1 | Danilo Fischetti | | (substituted off) 56' |
Substitutions:
| HK | 16 | Gianmarco Lucchesi | | (substituted on) 56' |
| PR | 17 | Muhamed Hasa | | (substituted on) 56' |
| PR | 18 | Marco Riccioni | | (substituted on) 57' |
| LK | 19 | Enoch Opoku-Gyamfi | (yellow card) 58' | (substituted on) 56' |
| BR | 20 | Alessandro Ortombina | | (substituted on) 76' |
| BR | 21 | Samuele Locatelli |
| SH | 22 | Alessandro Garbisi | | (substituted on) 76' |
| CE | 23 | Federico Mori | | (substituted on) 70' |
Coach:
Gonzalo Quesada

| FB | 15 | Bautista Delguy |
| RW | 14 | Rodrigo Isgró |
| OC | 13 | Justo Piccardo |
| IC | 12 | Santiago Chocobares |
| LW | 11 | Mateo Carreras |
| FH | 10 | Tomás Albornoz | (yellow card) 28' |
| SH | 9 | Simón Benítez Cruz | | (substituted off) 52' |
| N8 | 8 | Juan Martín Scelzo | | (substituted off) 56' |
| OF | 7 | Joaquín Moro | | (substituted off) 45' |
| BF | 6 | Pablo Matera (c) |
| RL | 5 | Pedro Rubiolo |
| LL | 4 | Guido Petti | | (substituted off) 56' |
| TP | 3 | Francisco Moreno | | (substituted off) 52' |
| HK | 2 | Bautista Bernasconi | | (substituted off) 55' |
| LP | 1 | Boris Wenger | | (substituted off) 52' |
Substitutions:
| HK | 16 | Facundo Bosch | | (substituted on) 55' |
| PR | 17 | Mayco Vivas | | (substituted on) 52' |
| PR | 18 | Joel Sclavi | (yellow card) 62' | (substituted on) 52' |
| LK | 19 | Efraín Elías | (yellow card) 65' | (substituted on) 56' |
| BR | 20 | Juan Martín González | | (substituted on) 45' |
| BR | 21 | Facundo Isa | | (substituted on) 56' |
| SH | 22 | Gonzalo García | | (substituted on) 52' |
| FH | 23 | Gerónimo Prisciantelli |
Coach:
Felipe Contepomi

Player of the Match:
Manuel Zuliani (Italy)

Assistant referees:
Karl Dickson (England)
Morné Ferreira (South Africa)
Television match official:
Olly Hodges (Ireland)
Foul play review officer:
Ian Tempest (England)

==== Wales v New Zealand ====
14 November 2026
14:10 GMT (UTC+0)

| (1 BP) Wales | 35–28 | New Zealand (2 BP) |
| Try: Williams 1' c Lake 5' c Griffin 23' c James 43' c Rees-Zammit 48' c Con: Costelow (5/5) 2', 6', 24', 44', 48' | Report; Post-Match Report | Try: Ratima 9' c Sititi 30' c Fineanganofo 42' c Lakai 52' c Con: Mo'unga (4/4) 9', 31', 43', 53' |

Millennium Stadium, Cardiff
Attendance: 55,152
Referee: Pierre Brousset (France)

| Wales | New Zealand |

| FB | 15 | Blair Murray |
| RW | 14 | Louis Rees-Zammit |
| OC | 13 | Eddie James |
| IC | 12 | Max Llewellyn |
| LW | 11 | Gabriel Hamer-Webb | (substituted off) 54' |
| FH | 10 | Sam Costelow | (substituted off) 65' |
| SH | 9 | Tomos Williams | (substituted off) 65' |
| N8 | 8 | Taine Basham | (substituted off) 54' |
| OF | 7 | Jac Morgan |
| BF | 6 | James Botham |
| RL | 5 | Adam Beard | (substituted off) 65' |
| LL | 4 | Dafydd Jenkins |
| TP | 3 | Archie Griffin | (substituted off) 54' |
| HK | 2 | Dewi Lake (c) | (substituted off) 49' | (substituted on) 60' | (substituted off) 70' |
| LP | 1 | Nicky Smith | (substituted off) 54' |
Substitutions:
| HK | 16 | Ryan Elias | (substituted on) 49' | (substituted off) 60' | (substituted on) 70' |
| PR | 17 | Gareth Thomas | (substituted on) 54' |
| PR | 18 | Dillon Lewis | (substituted on) 54' |
| LK | 19 | Ben Carter | (substituted on) 65' |
| BR | 20 | Taine Plumtree | (substituted on) 54' |
| SH | 21 | Reuben Morgan-Williams | (substituted on) 65' |
| FH | 22 | Dan Edwards | (substituted on) 65' |
| CE | 23 | Louie Hennessey | (substituted on) 54' |
Coach:
Steve Tandy

| FB | 15 | Beauden Barrett (c) |
| RW | 14 | Fehi Fineanganofo | (substituted off) 67' |
| OC | 13 | Quinn Tupaea |
| IC | 12 | Anton Lienert-Brown |
| LW | 11 | Josh Moorby |
| FH | 10 | Richie Mo'unga |
| SH | 9 | Cortez Ratima | (substituted off) 65' |
| N8 | 8 | Wallace Sititi | (substituted off) 65' |
| OF | 7 | Peter Lakai |
| BF | 6 | Anton Segner |
| RL | 5 | Josh Lord | (substituted off) 65' |
| LL | 4 | Scott Barrett |
| TP | 3 | Fletcher Newell | (substituted off) 49' |
| HK | 2 | Asafo Aumua | (substituted off) 65' |
| LP | 1 | George Bower | (substituted off) 49' |
Substitutions:
| HK | 16 | George Bell | (substituted on) 65' |
| PR | 17 | Xavier Numia | (substituted on) 49' |
| PR | 18 | Pasilio Tosi | (substituted on) 49' |
| LK | 19 | Jamie Hannah | (substituted on) 65' | (substituted off) 70' |
| BR | 20 | Ethan Blackadder | | (substituted on) 70' |
| BR | 21 | Leicester Faingaʻanuku | (substituted on) 65' |
| CE | 22 | Kyle Preston | (substituted on) 65' |
| WG | 23 | Rieko Ioane | (substituted on) 67' |
Coach:
Dave Rennie

Player of the Match:
James Botham (Wales)

Assistant referees:
Nic Berry (Australia)
Luc Ramos (France)
Television match official:
Tual Trainini (France)
Foul play review officer:
Leo Colgan (Ireland)

Notes:

- This was Wales' first win against New Zealand since 1953 (72 years, 330 days), and ended a 34-match losing streak.
- Wales's 35 points was the most they had scored against New Zealand at home.
- Wales set a new record for the number of tackles (346) in a test match; Dafydd Jenkins (Wales) equalled the record for most tackles made by an individual player in a test match, with 38.

==== England v Japan ====
14 November 2026
16:40 GMT (UTC+0)

| (1 BP) England | 78–15 | Japan |
| Try: Joseph (5) 1' m, 9' m, 19' m, 24' m, 55' c Steward 14' c Genge 17' c Murley 28' m Earl 39' c Martin 44' m Curry 63' m Smith 67' c Fisilau 72' m Con: Ford (3/9) 14', 18', 40'; Slade (2/4) 56', 68'; Pen: Ford (1/1) 7' | Report; Post-Match Report | Try: Dearns 36' c Helu 47' m Con: Saitō (1/2) 37'; Pen: Saitō (1/1) 13' |

Twickenham Stadium, London
Attendance: 81,552
Referee: Damián Schneider (Argentina)

| England | Japan |

| FB | 15 | Freddie Steward |
| RW | 14 | Will Joseph |
| OC | 13 | Henry Slade |
| IC | 12 | Max Ojomoh | | (substituted off) 59' | (substituted on) 64' |
| LW | 11 | Cadan Murley |
| FH | 10 | George Ford | | (substituted off) 58' |
| SH | 9 | Jack van Poortvliet | | (substituted off) 49' |
| N8 | 8 | Henry Pollock | | (substituted off) 58' |
| OF | 7 | Ben Earl | | (substituted off) 52' |
| BF | 6 | Alex Coles |
| RL | 5 | George Martin |
| LL | 4 | Maro Itoje (c) | | (substituted off) 64' |
| TP | 3 | Asher Opoku-Fordjour | | (substituted off) 59' |
| HK | 2 | Luke Cowan-Dickie | (yellow card) 54' | | (substituted off) 64' |
| LP | 1 | Ellis Genge | | (substituted off) 52' |
Substitutions:
| HK | 16 | Theo Dan | | (substituted on) 59' |
| PR | 17 | Emmanuel Iyogun | | (substituted on) 52' |
| PR | 18 | Joe Heyes | | (substituted on) 59' |
| LK | 19 | Arthur Clark | | (substituted on) 64' |
| BR | 20 | Ben Curry | | (substituted on) 58' |
| BR | 21 | Greg Fisilau | | (substituted on) 52' |
| SH | 22 | Archie McParland | | (substituted on) 49' |
| FH | 23 | Marcus Smith | | (substituted on) 58' |
Coach:
Steve Borthwick

| FB | 15 | Kazuma Ueda |
| RW | 14 | Kippei Ishida |
| OC | 13 | Dylan Riley |
| IC | 12 | Samisoni Tua | | | (substituted off) 71' |
| LW | 11 | Riku Tokito | | (substituted off) 28' |
| FH | 10 | Riku Kitahara | | (substituted off) 49' | (substituted on) 71' |
| SH | 9 | Naoto Saitō | | (substituted off) 65' |
| N8 | 8 | Jack Cornelsen |
| OF | 7 | Kanji Shimokawa |
| BF | 6 | Ben Gunter | | (substituted off) 58' |
| RL | 5 | Warner Dearns (c) |
| LL | 4 | Harry Hockings | (red card) 1' | (substituted off) 23' |
| TP | 3 | Shuhei Takeuchi | | (substituted off) 41' | (substituted on) 80' |
| HK | 2 | Mamoru Harada | | (substituted off) 47' |
| LP | 1 | Yota Kamimori | | (substituted off) 52' |
Substitutions:
| HK | 16 | Kenji Sato | | (substituted on) 47' |
| PR | 17 | Sojiro Otsuka | | (substituted on) 52' |
| PR | 18 | Opeti Helu | | (substituted on) 41' | (substituted off) 80' |
| LK | 19 | Michael Stolberg | | (substituted on) 23' |
| BR | 20 | Tiennan Costley | | (substituted on) 28' |
| SH | 21 | Shinobu Fujiwara | | (substituted on) 65' |
| FH | 22 | Shinya Komura | | (substituted on) 49' |
| CE | 23 | Jisu Lee | | (substituted on) 58' |
Coach:
Eddie Jones

Player of the Match:
Will Joseph (England)

Assistant referees:
Ben O'Keeffe (New Zealand)
Craig Evans (Wales)
Television match official:
Marius van der Westhuizen (South Africa)
Foul play review officer:
Aled Griffiths (Wales)

Notes:

- Archie McParland (England) and Riku Tokitō (Japan) made their test debuts.
- Will Joseph equalled the English record of most tries scored in a match by a player (5), becoming the fifth player to achieve the record.
- England's 78 points scored, and margin of victory (63), were both new records set against Japan, surpassing the previous best set in their first meeting in 1987.

==== Ireland v Fiji ====
14 November 2026
20:10 GMT (UTC+0)

| (1 BP) Ireland | 43–15 | Fiji |
| Try: O'Brien (2) 7' c, 59' c Baloucoune (2) 29' m, 38' m Kelleher 45' m Porter 53' c Timoney 76' c Con: Prendergast (3/6) 8', 53', 60'; Frawley (1/1) 77' | Report; Post-Match Report | Try: Tuisova 18' m Yato 22' c Con: Volavola (1/2) 23'; Pen: Volavola (1/1) 42' |

Aviva Stadium, Dublin
Attendance: 50,000
Referee: Angus Gardner (Australia)

| Ireland | Fiji |

| FB | 15 | Mack Hansen |
| RW | 14 | Robert Baloucoune |
| OC | 13 | Jamie Osborne | | (substituted off) 4' |
| IC | 12 | Bundee Aki |
| LW | 11 | Tommy O'Brien |
| FH | 10 | Sam Prendergast | | (substituted off) 61' |
| SH | 9 | Jamison Gibson-Park | | (substituted off) 56' |
| N8 | 8 | Nick Timoney | | (substituted off) 50' | (substituted on) 54' |
| OF | 7 | Josh van der Flier |
| BF | 6 | Ryan Baird |
| RL | 5 | Tadhg Beirne (c) | (yellow card) 41' |
| LL | 4 | James Ryan | | (substituted off) 56' |
| TP | 3 | Tadhg Furlong | | (substituted off) 50' | (substituted on) 73' |
| HK | 2 | Rónan Kelleher | | (substituted off) 62' |
| LP | 1 | Andrew Porter | | (substituted off) 61' |
Substitutions:
| HK | 16 | Tom Stewart | | (substituted on) 62' |
| PR | 17 | Tom O'Toole | | (substituted on) 61' |
| PR | 18 | Sam Illo | | (substituted on) 50' | (substituted off) 73' |
| LK | 19 | Darragh Murray | | (substituted on) 56' |
| BR | 20 | James McNabney | | (substituted on) 50' | (substituted off) 54' |
| SH | 21 | Craig Casey | | (substituted on) 56' |
| FH | 22 | Ciarán Frawley | | (substituted on) 61' |
| CE | 23 | Stuart McCloskey | | (substituted on) 4' |
Coach:
Andy Farrell

| FB | 15 | Ponepati Loganimasi |
| RW | 14 | Selestino Ravutaumada |
| OC | 13 | Setareki Bituniyata | | (substituted off) 53' |
| IC | 12 | Josua Tuisova |
| LW | 11 | Jiuta Wainiqolo |
| FH | 10 | Ben Volavola | | (substituted off) 73' |
| SH | 9 | Frank Lomani | | (substituted off) 73' |
| N8 | 8 | Peceli Yato (c) | | (substituted off) 26' |
| OF | 7 | Lekima Tagitagivalu | | (substituted off) 53' |
| BF | 6 | Mesake Vocevoce |
| RL | 5 | Isoa Nasilasila |
| LL | 4 | Joseva Tamani |
| TP | 3 | Luke Tagi | | (substituted off) 53' | (substituted on) 56' | (substituted off) 64' |
| HK | 2 | Tevita Ikanivere | | (substituted off) 73' |
| LP | 1 | Peni Ravai | | (substituted off) 53' |
Substitutions:
| HK | 16 | Zuriel Togiatama | | (substituted on) 73' |
| PR | 17 | Vilikesa Nairau | | (substituted on) 53' |
| PR | 18 | Inoke Ravuiwasa | (yellow card) 53' | (substituted on) 53' |
| BR | 19 | Kitione Salawa | | (substituted on) 26' |
| BR | 20 | Elia Canakaivata | | (substituted on) 53' | (substituted off) 56' | (substituted on) 64' |
| SH | 21 | Terio Tamani | | (substituted on) 73' |
| FH | 22 | Caleb Muntz | | (substituted on) 73' |
| CE | 23 | Iosefo Masi | | (substituted on) 53' |
Coach:
Jake White

Player of the Match:
Ryan Baird (Ireland)

Assistant referees:
Luke Pearce (England)
Damon Murphy (Australia)
Television match official:
Mike Adamson (Scotland)
Foul play review officer:
Eric Gauzins (France)

Notes:

- James McNabney (Ireland) made his international debut.

==== Scotland v Australia ====
15 November 2026
15:10 GMT (UTC+0)

| Scotland | 15–12 | Australia (1 BP) |
| Try: M. Fagerson 8' m Dempsey 27' c Con: Russell (1/2) 28'; Pen: Russell 74' | Report; Post-Match Report | Try: Potter 11' m Jorgensen 79' c Con: Donaldson (1/1) 79' |

Murrayfield Stadium, Edinburgh
Attendance: 65,095
Referee: James Doleman (New Zealand)

| Scotland | Australia |

| FB | 15 | Blair Kinghorn |
| RW | 14 | Kyle Steyn | (substituted off) 36' | (substituted on) 41' |
| OC | 13 | Huw Jones |
| IC | 12 | Tom Jordan | (substituted off) 76' |
| LW | 11 | Darcy Graham |
| FH | 10 | Finn Russell |
| SH | 9 | Ben White | | | (substituted off) 51' |
| N8 | 8 | Jack Dempsey | (substituted off) 51' |
| OF | 7 | Rory Darge (c) |
| BF | 6 | Matt Fagerson | (substituted off) 70' |
| RL | 5 | Scott Cummings | (substituted off) 25' |
| LL | 4 | Gregor Brown |
| TP | 3 | Zander Fagerson | (substituted off) 62' |
| HK | 2 | Ewan Ashman | (substituted off) 62' |
| LP | 1 | Rory Sutherland | (substituted off) 46' |
Substitutions:
| HK | 16 | Gregor Hiddleston | (substituted on) 62' |
| PR | 17 | Pierre Schoeman | (substituted on) 46' |
| PR | 18 | Will Hurd | (substituted on) 62' |
| LK | 19 | Max Williamson | (substituted on) 25' |
| BR | 20 | Josh Bayliss | (substituted on) 51' |
| BR | 21 | Ollie Leatherbarrow | (substituted on) 70' |
| SH | 22 | Jamie Dobie | (substituted on) 36' | (substituted off) 41' | (substituted on) 51' |
| CE | 23 | Stafford McDowall | (substituted on) 76' |
Coach:
Gregor Townsend

| FB | 15 | Tom Wright |
| RW | 14 | Max Jorgensen |
| OC | 13 | Joseph-Aukuso Suaalii |
| IC | 12 | Len Ikitau | | (substituted off) 70' |
| LW | 11 | Harry Potter | | (substituted off) 63' |
| FH | 10 | Carter Gordon |
| SH | 9 | Ryan Lonergan | | (substituted off) 76' |
| N8 | 8 | Harry Wilson (c) |
| OF | 7 | Fraser McReight |
| BF | 6 | Rob Valetini | | (substituted off) 54' |
| RL | 5 | Jeremy Williams |
| LL | 4 | Josh Canham | | (substituted off) 62' |
| TP | 3 | Allan Alaalatoa | | (substituted off) 53' |
| HK | 2 | Billy Pollard | (yellow card) 45' | (substituted off) 56' |
| LP | 1 | Angus Bell | | (substituted off) 62' |
Substitutions:
| HK | 16 | Brandon Paenga-Amosa | | (substituted on) 54' |
| PR | 17 | Isaac Aedo Kailea | | (substituted on) 62' |
| PR | 18 | Taniela Tupou | | (substituted on) 53' |
| BR | 19 | Lachlan Shaw | | (substituted on) 62' |
| BR | 20 | Tom Hooper | | (substituted on) 56' |
| SH | 21 | Tate McDermott | | (substituted on) 76' |
| FH | 22 | Ben Donaldson | | (substituted on) 70' |
| WG | 23 | Filipo Daugunu | | (substituted on) 63' |
Coach:
Les Kiss

Player of the Match:
Rory Darge (Scotland)

Assistant referees:
Paul Williams (New Zealand)
Angus Mabey (New Zealand)
Television match official:
Andrew Jackson (England)
Foul play review officer:
Matteo Liperini (Italy)

Notes:

- Ollie Leatherbarrow (Scotland) made his international debut.

=== Round 6 ===
==== England v New Zealand ====
21 November 2026
14:10 GMT (UTC+0)

| (1 BP) England | 37–12 | New Zealand |
| Try: Slade 5' m van Poortvliet 32' c Earl 36' c Chessum 43' m Atkinson 63' c Con: F. Smith (2/4) 32', 37'; M. Smith (1/1) 64'; Pen: M. Smith (2/2) 57', 81' | Report | Try: de Groot 39' m B. Barrett 52' c Con: McKenzie (1/2) 52' |

Twickenham Stadium, London
Attendance: 81,953
Referee: Nic Berry (Australia)

| England | New Zealand |

| FB | 15 | George Furbank |
| RW | 14 | Tommy Freeman |
| OC | 13 | Henry Slade |
| IC | 12 | Seb Atkinson |
| LW | 11 | Will Joseph | (substituted off) 67' |
| FH | 10 | Fin Smith | (substituted off) 56' |
| SH | 9 | Jack van Poortvliet | (substituted off) 64' |
| N8 | 8 | Ben Earl |
| OF | 7 | Ben Curry | (substituted off) 53' |
| BF | 6 | Ollie Chessum |
| RL | 5 | Alex Coles | (substituted off) 52' | (substituted on) 68' | (substituted off) 80' |
| LL | 4 | Maro Itoje (c) |
| TP | 3 | Joe Heyes | (substituted off) 53' |
| HK | 2 | Jamie George | (substituted off) 53' |
| LP | 1 | Fin Baxter | (substituted off) 53' |
Substitutions:
| HK | 16 | Luke Cowan-Dickie | (substituted on) 53' |
| PR | 17 | Ellis Genge | (substituted on) 53' |
| PR | 18 | Will Stuart | (substituted on) 53' |
| LK | 19 | George Martin | (substituted on) 52' | (substituted off) 68' | (substituted on) 80' |
| BR | 20 | Greg Fisilau | (substituted on) 53' |
| BR | 21 | Henry Pollock | (substituted on) 67' |
| SH | 22 | Ben Spencer | (substituted on) 64' |
| FH | 23 | Marcus Smith | (substituted on) 56' |
Coach:
Steve Borthwick

| FB | 15 | Beauden Barrett | (substituted off) 67' |
| RW | 14 | Will Jordan | (substituted off) 52' |
| OC | 13 | Anton Lienert-Brown | (substituted off) 64' |
| IC | 12 | Jordie Barrett |
| LW | 11 | Josh Moorby |
| FH | 10 | Damian McKenzie |
| SH | 9 | Cam Roigard | (substituted off) 67' |
| N8 | 8 | Wallace Sititi |
| OF | 7 | Peter Lakai |
| BF | 6 | Tupou Vaa'i | (substituted off) 56' |
| RL | 5 | Fabian Holland |
| LL | 4 | Scott Barrett |
| TP | 3 | Fletcher Newell | (substituted off) 64' |
| HK | 2 | Codie Taylor (c) | (substituted off) 56' |
| LP | 1 | Ethan de Groot | (substituted off) 52' |
Substitutions:
| HK | 16 | Asafo Aumua | (substituted on) 56' |
| PR | 17 | George Bower | (substituted on) 64' |
| PR | 18 | Pasilio Tosi | (substituted on) 52' |
| BR | 19 | Anton Segner | (substituted on) 56' |
| BR | 20 | Leicester Fainga'anuku | (substituted on) 64' |
| SH | 21 | Cortez Ratima | (substituted on) 67' |
| FH | 22 | Richie Mo'unga | (substituted on) 67' |
| WG | 23 | Rieko Ioane | (substituted on) 52' |
Coach:
Dave Rennie

Player of the Match:
Ben Earl (England)

Assistant referees:
Nika Amashukeli (Georgia)
Damon Murphy (Australia)
Television match official:
Marius van der Westhuizen (South Africa)
Foul play review officer:
Olly Hodges (Ireland)

Notes:

- Beauden Barrett (New Zealand) became the fourth player to earn 150 test caps.
- This was the first time that England have won back-to-back test matches against New Zealand since their 2002/2003 encounters.
- England retained the Hillary Shield, and in doing so, retained it for the first time.
- With this result, and other international results, New Zealand dropped to 5th on the World Rugby Rankings, a position not held since 2022 and their joint-lowest ranking.

==== Scotland v Japan ====
21 November 2026
14:10 GMT (UTC+0)

| (1 BP) Scotland | 67–5 | Japan |
| Try: Graham (3) 6' m, 31' c, 79' c McConnell (3) 13' c, 48' m, 56' c Rowe 20' m Smith (2) 40' m, 67' c Dobie 62' c Hutchinson 74' m Con: Jordan (3/8) 14', 32', 57'; Horne (3/4) 63', 68', 80' | Report | Try: Matsunaga 53' m |

Murrayfield Stadium, Edinburgh
Attendance: 67,148
Referee: Ben O'Keeffe (New Zealand)

| Scotland | Japan |

| FB | 15 | Ollie Smith |
| RW | 14 | Darcy Graham |
| OC | 13 | Stafford McDowall |
| IC | 12 | Rory Hutchinson |
| LW | 11 | Kyle Rowe | (substituted off) 57' |
| FH | 10 | Tom Jordan | (substituted off) 57' |
| SH | 9 | Jamie Dobie |
| N8 | 8 | Ollie Leatherbarrow | (substituted off) 52' |
| OF | 7 | Rory Darge (c) | (substituted off) 70' |
| BF | 6 | Liam McConnell |
| RL | 5 | Max Williamson | (substituted off) 57' |
| LL | 4 | Jonny Gray |
| TP | 3 | Zander Fagerson | (substituted off) 57' |
| HK | 2 | Gregor Hiddleston | (substituted off) 52' |
| LP | 1 | Nathan McBeth | (substituted off) 41' |
Substitutions:
| HK | 16 | Seb Stephen | (substituted on) 52' |
| PR | 17 | Rory Sutherland | (substituted on) 41' |
| PR | 18 | Will Hurd | (substituted on) 57' |
| LK | 19 | Gregor Brown | (substituted on) 57' |
| BR | 20 | Magnus Bradbury | (substituted on) 52' |
| BR | 21 | Matt Fagerson | (substituted on) 70' |
| SH | 22 | George Horne | (substituted on) 57' |
| FB | 23 | Blair Kinghorn | (substituted on) 57' |
Coach:
Gregor Townsend

| FB | 15 | Takuro Matsunaga |
| RW | 14 | Kazuma Ueda |
| OC | 13 | Chisu Lee |
| IC | 12 | Charlie Lawrence | | (substituted off) 41' | (substituted on) 44' |
| LW | 11 | Jone Naikabula |
| FH | 10 | Shinya Komura | | (substituted off) 63' |
| SH | 9 | Naoto Saitō | | (substituted off) 52' |
| N8 | 8 | Faulua Makisi | | (substituted off) 60' |
| OF | 7 | Kanji Shimokawa |
| BF | 6 | Ben Gunter | | | | (substituted off) 47' |
| RL | 5 | Warner Dearns (c) | | (substituted off) 63' |
| LL | 4 | Jack Cornelsen | | | (substituted off) 72' |
| TP | 3 | Ryosuke Iwaihara | | (substituted off) 32' |
| HK | 2 | Kenji Sato | | (substituted off) 49' | (substituted on) 72' |
| LP | 1 | Sojiro Otsuka | | (substituted off) 41' |
Substitutions:
| HK | 16 | Mamoru Harada | (yellow card) 69' | (substituted on) 49' |
| PR | 17 | Yota Kamimori | | (substituted on) 41' |
| PR | 18 | Taufa Latu | | (substituted on) 32' |
| LK | 19 | Michael Stolberg | (yellow card) 78' | (substituted on) 60' |
| LK | 20 | Ruan Botha | | (substituted on) 63' |
| BR | 21 | Tiennan Costley | | (substituted on) 41' | (substituted off) 44' | (substituted on) 47' |
| SH | 22 | Shinobu Fujiwara | | (substituted on) 52' |
| WG | 23 | Riku Tokito | | (substituted on) 63' |
Coach:
Eddie Jones

Player of the Match:
Liam McConnell (Scotland)

Assistant referees:
James Doleman (New Zealand)
Craig Evans (Wales)
Television match official:
Richard Kelly (New Zealand)
Foul play review officer:
Aled Griffiths (Wales)

Notes:

- Taufa Latu (Japan) madę his international debut.

==== Ireland v South Africa ====
21 November 2026
16:40 GMT (UTC+0)

| Ireland | 20–17 | South Africa (1 BP) |
| Try: Baloucoune (2) 8' m, 19' m Kelleher 40' c Con: Prendergast (1/3) 41'; Pen: Prendergast (1/1) 54' | Report | Try: van den Berg 36' c Marx 58' c Con: Feinberg-Mngomezulu (2/2) 37', 59'; Pen: Feinberg-Mngomezulu (1/1) 5' |

Aviva Stadium, Dublin
Attendance: 51,700
Referee: Christophe Ridley (England)

| Ireland | South Africa |

| FB | 15 | Hugo Keenan |
| RW | 14 | Robert Baloucoune |
| OC | 13 | Robbie Henshaw | | (substituted off) 27' | (substituted on) 31' | (substituted off) 51' |
| IC | 12 | Stuart McCloskey |
| LW | 11 | Mack Hansen |
| FH | 10 | Sam Prendergast |
| SH | 9 | Jamison Gibson-Park |
| N8 | 8 | Dan Sheehan (c) | (red card) 72' | (substituted off) 43' | (substituted on) 53' |
| OF | 7 | Josh van der Flier | | | | (substituted off) 60' |
| BF | 6 | Ryan Baird |
| RL | 5 | Tadhg Beirne |
| LL | 4 | Joe McCarthy | | (substituted off) 60' |
| TP | 3 | Tadhg Furlong | | (substituted off) 51' |
| HK | 2 | Rónan Kelleher | | (substituted off) 60' |
| LP | 1 | Andrew Porter | | (substituted off) 71' |
Substitutions:
| HK | 16 | Tom Stewart | | (substituted on) 60' |
| PR | 17 | Tom O'Toole | | (substituted on) 71' |
| PR | 18 | Thomas Clarkson | | (substituted on) 51' |
| LK | 19 | James Ryan | | (substituted on) 60' |
| BR | 20 | Nick Timoney | | (substituted on) 43' | (substituted off) 53' | (substituted on) 60' |
| SH | 21 | Craig Casey |
| FH | 22 | Ciarán Frawley |
| CE | 23 | Bundee Aki | | (substituted on) 27' | (substituted off) 31' | (substituted on) 51' |
Coach:
Andy Farrell

| FB | 15 | Damian Willemse | | (substituted off) 25' |
| RW | 14 | Kurt-Lee Arendse |
| OC | 13 | Jesse Kriel |
| IC | 12 | Damian de Allende | | (substituted off) 63' |
| LW | 11 | Ethan Hooker |
| FH | 10 | Sacha Feinberg-Mngomezulu |
| SH | 9 | Morné van den Berg |
| N8 | 8 | Cameron Hanekom | | (substituted off) 47' | (substituted on) 53' |
| BF | 7 | Pieter-Steph du Toit | | | (substituted off) 53' |
| OF | 6 | Siya Kolisi (c) | | (substituted off) 47' |
| RL | 5 | Franco Mostert | | (substituted off) 47' |
| LL | 4 | Eben Etzebeth |
| TP | 3 | Wilco Louw | | (substituted off) 47' |
| HK | 2 | Malcolm Marx | | (substituted off) 61' |
| LP | 1 | Ox Nché | | (substituted off) 47' |
Substitutions:
| HK | 16 | Jan-Hendrik Wessels | | (substituted on) 61' |
| PR | 17 | Gerhard Steenekamp | | (substituted on) 47' |
| PR | 18 | Thomas du Toit | | (substituted on) 47' |
| LK | 19 | Lood de Jager | | (substituted on) 47' |
| BR | 20 | Paul de Villiers | | (substituted on) 47' |
| BR | 21 | Marco van Staden | (red card) 72' | (substituted on) 47' |
| SH | 22 | Grant Williams | | (substituted on) 63' |
| CE | 23 | Canan Moodie | | (substituted on) 25' |
Coach:
Rassie Erasmus

Player of the Match:
Robert Baloucoune (Ireland)

Assistant referees:
Angus Gardner (Australia)
Anthony Woodthorpe (England)
Television match official:
Ian Tempest (England)
Foul play review officer:
Tual Trainini (France)

Notes:

- This was the first time since August 2022 that South Africa has lost two consecutive test matches.

==== Italy v Fiji ====
21 November 2026
17:40 CET (UTC+1)

| (1 BP) Italy | 16–21 | Fiji |
| Try: L. Cannone 9' c Con: Allan (1/1) 10'; Pen: Allan (3/3) 14', 33', 65' | Report | Try: Ikanivere (2) 18' c, 45' c Salawa Jr. 52' c Con: Volavola (1/1) 19'; Muntz (2/2) 46', 52' |

Stadio Friuli, Udine
Attendance: 22,734
Referee: Andrew Brace (Ireland)

| Italy | Fiji |

| FB | 15 | Tommaso Allan |
| RW | 14 | Ange Capuozzo |
| OC | 13 | Paolo Odogwu | (substituted off) 76' |
| IC | 12 | Leonardo Marin |
| LW | 11 | Monty Ioane |
| FH | 10 | Domingo Miotti | (substituted off) 48' |
| SH | 9 | Stephen Varney |
| N8 | 8 | Lorenzo Cannone |
| OF | 7 | Manuel Zuliani |
| BF | 6 | Ross Vintcent | (substituted off) 77' |
| RL | 5 | Alessandro Ortombina | (substituted off) 66' |
| LL | 4 | Niccolò Cannone | (substituted off) 60' |
| TP | 3 | Simone Ferrari | (substituted off) 71' |
| HK | 2 | Giacomo Nicotera (c) | (substituted off) 57' |
| LP | 1 | Danilo Fischetti | (substituted off) 69' |
Substitutions:
| HK | 16 | Gianmarco Lucchesi | (substituted on) 57' |
| PR | 17 | Muhamed Hasa | (substituted on) 69' |
| PR | 18 | Marco Riccioni | (substituted on) 71' |
| LK | 19 | Federico Ruzza | (substituted on) 66' |
| BR | 20 | Enoch Opoku-Gyamfi | (substituted on) 60' |
| BR | 21 | Samuele Locatelli | (substituted on) 77' |
| SH | 22 | Alessandro Garbisi | (substituted on) 76' |
| CE | 23 | Federico Mori | (substituted on) 48' |
Coach:
Gonzalo Quesada

| FB | 15 | Ponepati Loganimasi |
| RW | 14 | Selestino Ravutaumada |
| OC | 13 | Setareki Bituniyata | (substituted off) 74' |
| IC | 12 | Josua Tuisova |
| LW | 11 | Jiuta Wainiqolo |
| FH | 10 | Ben Volavola | (substituted off) 43' |
| SH | 9 | Frank Lomani | (substituted off) 66' |
| N8 | 8 | Nathan Hughes | (substituted off) 57' |
| OF | 7 | Kitione Salawa Jr. |
| BF | 6 | Mesake Vocevoce |
| RL | 5 | Isoa Nasilasila |
| LL | 4 | Setareki Turagacoke | (substituted off) 66' |
| TP | 3 | Luke Tagi | (substituted off) 51' |
| HK | 2 | Tevita Ikanivere (c) | (substituted off) 51' |
| LP | 1 | Peni Ravai | (substituted off) 51' |
Substitutions:
| HK | 16 | Zuriel Togiatama | (substituted on) 51' |
| PR | 17 | Vilikesa Narisia | (substituted on) 51' |
| PR | 18 | Marika Parker | (substituted on) 51' |
| BR | 19 | Joseva Tamani | (substituted on) 66' |
| LK | 20 | Etonia Waqa | (substituted on) 57' |
| SH | 21 | Terio Tamani | (substituted on) 66' |
| FH | 22 | Caleb Muntz | (substituted on) 43' |
| CE | 23 | Iosefo Masi | (substituted on) 74' |
Coach:
Jake White

Player of the Match:
Kitione Salawa Jr. (Fiji)

Assistant referees:
Paul Williams (New Zealand)
Eoghan Cross (Ireland)
Television match official:
Leo Colgan (Ireland)
Foul play review officer:
Dan Jones (England)

Notes:

- Marika Parker (Fiji) made his international debut.

==== Wales v Australia ====
21 November 2026
20:10 GMT (UTC+0)

| (2 BP) Wales | 26–29 | Australia (1 BP) |
| Try: Lake (2) 41' c, 50' c Murray 55' c Elias 79' m Con: Costelow (3/4) 42', 51', 56' | Report | Try: Tupou 21' m Paenga-Amosa 33' c Jorgensen 47' c Ikitau 64' c Con: Lonergan (2/3) 34', 48'; Gordon (1/1) 65'; Pen: Gordon (1/1) 74' |

Millennium Stadium, Cardiff
Attendance: 66,307
Referee: Luc Ramos (France)

| Wales | Australia |

| FB | 15 | Blair Murray |
| RW | 14 | Louis Rees-Zammit |
| OC | 13 | Eddie James |
| IC | 12 | Max Llewellyn | (yellow card) 2' |
| LW | 11 | Josh Adams | | (substituted off) 66' |
| FH | 10 | Sam Costelow |
| SH | 9 | Tomos Williams | | (substituted off) 46' |
| N8 | 8 | Aaron Wainwright |
| OF | 7 | Jac Morgan | | (substituted off) 66' | (substituted on) 76' |
| BF | 6 | Alex Mann | | (substituted off) 49' |
| RL | 5 | Ben Carter | | | | (substituted off) 76' |
| LL | 4 | Dafydd Jenkins |
| TP | 3 | Archie Griffin | | (substituted off) 65' |
| HK | 2 | Dewi Lake (c) | | (substituted off) 58' |
| LP | 1 | Nicky Smith | | (substituted off) 49' |
Substitutions:
| HK | 16 | Ryan Elias | | (substituted on) 58' |
| PR | 17 | Gareth Thomas | | (substituted on) 49' |
| PR | 18 | Dillon Lewis | | (substituted on) 65' |
| BR | 19 | Taine Plumtree | | (substituted on) 49' |
| BR | 20 | Kane James | | (substituted on) 66' | (substituted off) 76' | (substituted on) 76' |
| SH | 21 | Reuben Morgan-Williams | | (substituted on) 46' |
| CE | 22 | Joe Hawkins |
| CE | 23 | Louie Hennessey | | (substituted on) 66' |
Coach:
Steve Tandy

| FB | 15 | Tom Wright |
| RW | 14 | Max Jorgensen | | (substituted off) 67' |
| OC | 13 | Joseph-Aukuso Sua'ali'i |
| IC | 12 | Len Ikitau | | (substituted off) 76' |
| LW | 11 | Harry Potter |
| FH | 10 | Carter Gordon |
| SH | 9 | Ryan Lonergan | | (substituted off) 58' |
| N8 | 8 | Harry Wilson (c) | (yellow card) 78' |
| OF | 7 | Carlo Tizzano | | (substituted off) 58' |
| BF | 6 | Rob Valetini |
| RL | 5 | Tom Hooper |
| LL | 4 | Josh Canham | | (substituted off) 67' |
| TP | 3 | Taniela Tupou | | (substituted off) 41' |
| HK | 2 | Brandon Paenga-Amosa | | (substituted off) 49' |
| LP | 1 | Isaac Aedo Kailea | | (substituted off) 49' |
Substitutions:
| HK | 16 | Billy Pollard | | (substituted on) 49' |
| PR | 17 | Angus Bell | | (substituted on) 49' |
| PR | 18 | Allan Alaalatoa | | (substituted on) 51' |
| LK | 19 | Jeremy Williams | | (substituted on) 67' |
| BR | 20 | Fraser McReight | | (substituted on) 58' |
| SH | 21 | Kalani Thomas | | (substituted on) 58' |
| FH | 22 | Ben Donaldson | | (substituted on) 76' |
| WG | 23 | Filipo Daugunu | | (substituted on) 67' |
Coach:
Les Kiss

Player of the Match:
Len Ikitau (Australia)

Assistant referees:
Karl Dickson (England)
Jérémy Rozier (France)
Television match official:
Eric Gauzins (France)
Foul play review officer:
Andrew Jackson (England)

Notes:

- Australia retained the James Bevan Trophy.

==== France v Argentina ====
21 November 2026
21:10 CET (UTC+1)

| (1 BP) France | 45–17 | Argentina |
| Try: Guillard 7' c Mauvaka 34' c Gourgues (2) 47' c, 70' m Gailleton 64' m Duguid 68' c Bielle-Biarrey 78' c Con: Gourgues (5/7) 8', 35', 48', 69', 79' | Report | Try: Piccardo 17' c Matera 72' c Con: Albornoz (2/2) 18', 73'; Pen: Albornoz (1/1) 24' |

Stade de France, Saint-Denis
Attendance: 80,000
Referee: Hollie Davidson (Scotland)

| France | Argentina |

| FB | 15 | Théo Attissogbe |
| RW | 14 | Aaron Grandidier-Nkanang | (substituted off) 61' |
| OC | 13 | Kalvin Gourgues |
| IC | 12 | Yoram Moefana |
| LW | 11 | Louis Bielle-Biarrey |
| FH | 10 | Matthieu Jalibert | (substituted off) 61' |
| SH | 9 | Antoine Dupont (c) |
| N8 | 8 | Anthony Jelonch | (substituted off) 56' |
| OF | 7 | Charles Ollivon | (substituted off) 56' |
| BF | 6 | Esteban Capilla |
| RL | 5 | Mickaël Guillard | (substituted off) 56' |
| LL | 4 | Florian Verhaeghe |
| TP | 3 | Sipili Falatea | (substituted off) 45' |
| HK | 2 | Peato Mauvaka | (substituted off) 57' | (substituted on) 65' | (substituted off) 76' |
| LP | 1 | Jean-Baptiste Gros | (substituted off) 45' | (substituted on) 69' | (substituted off) 79' |
Substitutions:
| HK | 16 | Maxime Lamothe | (substituted on) 57' | (substituted off) 65' | (substituted on) 76' |
| PR | 17 | Jefferson Poirot | (substituted on) 45' | (substituted off) 69' | (substituted on) 79' |
| PR | 18 | Régis Montagne | (substituted on) 45' |
| LK | 19 | Tyler Duguid | (substituted on) 56' |
| LK | 20 | Cameron Woki | (substituted on) 56' |
| BR | 21 | Grégory Alldritt | (substituted on) 56' |
| SH | 22 | Maxime Lucu | (substituted on) 61' |
| CE | 23 | Émilien Gailleton | (substituted on) 61' |
Coach:
Fabien Galthié

| FB | 15 | Gerónimo Prisciantelli |
| RW | 14 | Bautista Delguy | | (substituted off) 9' |
| OC | 13 | Lucio Cinti |
| IC | 12 | Justo Piccardo |
| LW | 11 | Ignacio Mendy |
| FH | 10 | Tomás Albornoz |
| SH | 9 | Simón Benítez Cruz | | (substituted off) 46' |
| N8 | 8 | Facundo Isa | | (substituted off) 41' | (substituted on) 77' |
| OF | 7 | Juan Martín Scelzo |
| BF | 6 | Juan Martín González |
| RL | 5 | Tomás Lavanini | | (substituted off) 40' |
| LL | 4 | Guido Petti | | (substituted off) 52' | (substituted on) 77' |
| TP | 3 | Francisco Moreno | | (substituted off) 52' | (substituted on) 63' |
| HK | 2 | Julián Montoya (c) | (yellow card) 67' | (substituted off) 77' |
| LP | 1 | Boris Wenger | | (substituted off) 18' |
Substitutions:
| HK | 16 | Facundo Bosch | | (substituted on) 77' |
| PR | 17 | Mayco Vivas | (red card) 59' | (substituted on) 18' |
| PR | 18 | Joel Sclavi | | (substituted on) 52' | (substituted off) 77' |
| LK | 19 | Efraín Elías | | (substituted on) 52' |
| LK | 20 | Pedro Rubiolo | | (substituted on) 40' |
| BR | 21 | Pablo Matera | | (substituted on) 41' | (substituted off) 77' |
| SH | 22 | Agustín Moyano | | (substituted on) 46' |
| WG | 23 | Rodrigo Isgró | | (substituted on) 9' | (substituted off) 63' |
Coach:
Felipe Contepomi

Player of the Match:
Kalvin Gourgues (France)

Assistant referees:
Matthew Carley (England)
Sam Grove-White (Scotland)
Television match official:
Mike Adamson (Scotland)
Foul play review officer:
Matteo Liperini (Italy)

== See also ==
- 2026 World Rugby Nations Cup
- 2026 Nations Championship Southern Hemisphere Series
- 2026 World Rugby Nations Cup Americas-Pacific Series
- 2026 World Rugby Nations Cup European-African-Asian Series
- 2026 men's rugby union internationals
