= Fisilau =

Fisilau is a Tongan surname. Notable people with the surname include:

- Greg Fisilau (born 2003), English rugby union player
- Kenni Fisilau (born 1976), Tongan rugby union player
- Samisoni Fisilau (born 1987), Tongan rugby union player
