= 2026 Nations Championship =

International rugby union tournament

- Number of teams: 12
- Date: 4 July – 29 November 2026
- Matches played: 36
- Attendance: 1,702,923 (average 47,303 per match)
- Highest attendance: 81,953 – England v New Zealand; 21 November 2026
- Lowest attendance: 11,021 – Japan v Ireland; 11 July 2026
- Tries scored: 309 (average 8.6 per match)
- Top point scorer: (France) Maxime Lucu (53)
- Top try scorer: (New Zealand) Will Jordan (6)

Official website
- nationschampionshiprugby.com

The 2026 Nations Championship is the inaugural edition of the Nations Championship, an international rugby union competition featuring twelve men's teams. The teams are divided into two pools of six, and play a full round-robin of matches with the teams in the opposing pool across the mid year and end-of-year international windows, with the top teams in each pool advancing to a Nations Championship final in London.

On 17 November 2025, World Rugby confirmed a second competition that would take place concurrently called the World Rugby Nations Cup.

Although promotion and relegation are intended for a future date, there will be no promotion or relegation in the 2026 edition between the Nations Championship and the Nations Cup.

== Participants ==
The following 12 nations are competing in the 2026 Nations Championship.

Team	Stadium			Head coach	Captain	World Ranking (at start of competition)
Team	Home stadium	Capacity	Location	Head coach	Captain	World Ranking (at start of competition)
Argentina	Estadio Mario Alberto Kempes	57,000	Cordoba	Felipe Contepomi	Julián Montoya; Pablo Matera (Note: For Italy v Argentina)	5
Argentina	Estadio San Juan del Bicentenario	25,286	San Juan	Felipe Contepomi	Julián Montoya; Pablo Matera	5
Argentina	Estadio Único Madre de Ciudades	30,000	Santiago del Estero	Felipe Contepomi	Julián Montoya; Pablo Matera	5
Australia	Lang Park	52,500	Brisbane	Joe Schmidt (Note: For the Southern Hemisphere Series.); Les Kiss (Note: From the Northern Hemisphere Series and Finals.)	Harry Wilson	8
Australia	Perth Rectangular Stadium	20,500	Perth	Joe Schmidt; Les Kiss	Harry Wilson	8
Australia	Sydney Football Stadium	42,500	Sydney	Joe Schmidt; Les Kiss	Harry Wilson	8
England	Twickenham Stadium	82,000	London	Steve Borthwick	Jamie George	6
France	Stade de France	81,338	Saint-Denis	Fabien Galthié	Maxime Lucu (Note: For the Southern Hemisphere Series.); Antoine Dupont (Note: From the Northern Hemisphere Series and Finals.)	4
France	Groupama Stadium	59,186	Lyon	Fabien Galthié	Maxime Lucu; Antoine Dupont	4
Fiji	Cardiff City Stadium	33,280	Cardiff, Wales	Senirusi Seruvakula (Note: For the Southern Hemisphere Series.); Jake White (Note: For the Northern Hemisphere Series and Finals.)	Tevita Ikanivere; Peceli Yato (Note: For Ireland v Fiji)	9
Fiji	Hill Dickinson Stadium	52,769	Liverpool, England	Senirusi Seruvakula; Jake White	Tevita Ikanivere; Peceli Yato	9
Fiji	Murrayfield Stadium	67,144	Edinburgh, Scotland	Senirusi Seruvakula; Jake White	Tevita Ikanivere; Peceli Yato	9
Ireland	Aviva Stadium	51,700	Dublin	Andy Farrell	Dan Sheehan; Tadhg Beirne (Note: For Japan v Ireland & Ireland v Fiji)	3
Italy	Juventus Stadium	41,689	Turin	Gonzalo Quesada	Michele Lamaro (Note: For the Southern Hemisphere Series.); Giacomo Nicotera (Note: From the Northern Hemisphere Series and Finals.)	10
Italy	Stadio Luigi Ferraris	33,205	Genoa	Gonzalo Quesada	Michele Lamaro; Giacomo Nicotera	10
Italy	Stadio Friuli	25,144	Udine	Gonzalo Quesada	Michele Lamaro; Giacomo Nicotera	10
Japan	Chichibunomiya Rugby Stadium	27,188	Tokyo	Eddie Jones	Warner Dearns	12
Japan	Newcastle International Sports Centre	33,000	Newcastle, Australia	Eddie Jones	Warner Dearns	12
Japan	Japan National Stadium	67,750	Tokyo	Eddie Jones	Warner Dearns	12
New Zealand	Eden Park	50,000	Auckland	Dave Rennie	Ardie Savea (Note: For the Southern Hemisphere Series.); Codie Taylor (Note: From the Northern Hemisphere Series and Finals.); Beauden Barrett (Note: For Italy v Argentina)	2
New Zealand	One New Zealand Stadium at Te Kaha	30,000	Christchurch	Dave Rennie	Ardie Savea; Codie Taylor; Beauden Barrett	2
New Zealand	Wellington Regional Stadium	34,000	Wellington	Dave Rennie	Ardie Savea; Codie Taylor; Beauden Barrett	2
Scotland	Murrayfield Stadium	67,144	Edinburgh	Gregor Townsend	Sione Tuipulotu; Stafford McDowall (Note: For Fiji v Scotland)	7
South Africa	Ellis Park Stadium	62,567	Johannesburg	Rassie Erasmus	Pieter-Steph du Toit (Note: For the Southern Hemisphere Series.); Siya Kolisi (Note: From the Northern Hemisphere Series and Finals.)	1
South Africa	Kings Park Stadium	46,000	Durban	Rassie Erasmus	Pieter-Steph du Toit; Siya Kolisi	1
South Africa	Loftus Versfeld Stadium	51,762	Pretoria	Rassie Erasmus	Pieter-Steph du Toit; Siya Kolisi	1
Wales	Principality (Millennium) Stadium	73,931	Cardiff	Steve Tandy	Dewi Lake	11

== Format ==
The Nations Championship consists of two geographic pools or conferences; the first, the European conference, consisting of the Six Nations; the second, the 'Rest of the World' conference, consisting of the Rugby Championship teams, plus Fiji and Japan. Over two international windows each team plays all the teams in the opposite pool once, with three games at home and three away. A cumulative north v south trophy will also be contested in this edition.

The standard World Rugby points system applies; teams earn:

- 4 points for a win
- 2 points for a draw
- 0 points for a loss
- 1 bonus point for scoring 4 or more tries
- 1 bonus point for losing by fewer than 8 points.

=== Fiji home fixtures ===
Fiji were required to reverse their home fixtures as their national stadium, the HFC Bank Stadium in Suva, does not meet competition requirements. Stadiums of the tournament are required to seat at least 25,000, while the HFC Bank Stadium is just under 10,000 short; in addition, 50% of these must be undercover. Travel logistics and commercial value was also considered for reversing the fixtures. As a result, Fiji will play their home game against Scotland away at Murrayfield while Wales and England opted to host Fiji at Cardiff City F.C.'s Cardiff City Stadium and Everton F.C.'s Bramley-Moore Dock Stadium respectively. Notably Australia hosted a fixture at the Perth Rectangular Stadium with a capacity below the stated minimum at only 20,500.

=== Japan–Ireland test ===
On 22 April 2026, it was announced that the match between Japan and Ireland would be played at Newcastle International Sports Centre in Newcastle, Australia. Originally scheduled as a home match for Japan, the match was moved due to travel concerns raised by Ireland. Japan head coach Eddie Jones was heavily critical of the decision, saying on the Rugby Unity podcast, "You know why we're playing Ireland in Newcastle? Ireland have all the power at World Rugby. So we have to play our home game, that should be in Tokyo, in Australia to make sure Ireland don't have to travel too much - let's be frank about it. We have to just suck it up and that's what happens when you're not a major political power at the table." France head coach Fabien Galthié also criticized the decision, stating before their match against Japan on 18 July, "The only flaw I'd find in this competition, it's that I don't understand why Ireland is facing Japan here (in Australia)."

== Championship division: Tables ==
The below shows the tables for the two conferences.

=== Northern Hemisphere ===
Pos	Team	Pld	W	D	L	PF	PA	PD	TF	TA	TB	LB	Pts
1	France	6	5	0	1	236	128	+108	34	18	5	1	26
2	England	6	5	0	1	285	126	+159	44	18	5	0	25
3	Ireland	6	5	0	1	195	135	+60	29	20	4	0	24
4	Scotland	6	4	0	2	211	157	+54	32	24	4	0	20
5	Wales	6	3	0	3	149	180	−31	22	26	4	1	17
6	Italy	6	0	0	6	74	237	−163	9	34	0	2	2

Source: Nations Championship Rugby

=== Southern Hemisphere ===
Pos	Team	Pld	W	D	L	PF	PA	PD	TF	TA	TB	LB	Pts
1	South Africa	6	4	0	2	232	97	+135	34	14	4	2	22
2	New Zealand	6	4	0	2	204	163	+41	31	22	5	1	22
3	Australia	6	2	0	4	177	171	+6	27	26	4	2	14
4	Argentina	6	2	0	4	145	200	−55	20	30	2	1	11
5	Japan	6	1	0	5	103	261	−158	13	40	0	1	5
6	Fiji	6	1	0	5	102	258	−156	14	38	0	0	4

Source: Nations Championship Rugby

In the event that two or more teams are tied on number of points, the tie is broken via:

1. Matches won
2. Points difference (total scored – total conceded)
3. Tries difference (tries scored – tries conceded)
4. Tries scored
5. Coin toss.

== Fixtures ==
=== Southern Hemisphere Series ===
Southern Hemisphere teams, apart from Fiji, hosted all the matches. All three of Fiji's "home" matches were played in Great Britain, while Japan v. Ireland was played in Australia.

==== Round 1 ====
4 July 2026	New Zealand	34–32	France	One NZ Stadium, Christchurch
4 July 2026	Japan	27–10	Italy	Chichibunomiya Rugby Stadium, Tokyo
4 July 2026	Australia	31–33	Ireland	Sydney Football Stadium, Sydney
4 July 2026	Fiji	24–39	Wales	Cardiff City Stadium, Cardiff (Wales)
4 July 2026	South Africa	45–21	England	Ellis Park Stadium, Johannesburg
4 July 2026	Argentina	38–47	Scotland	Estadio Mario Alberto Kempes, Cordoba

==== Round 2 ====
11 July 2026	New Zealand	47–17	Italy	Wellington Regional Stadium, Wellington
11 July 2026	Australia	26–42	France	Lang Park, Brisbane
11 July 2026	Japan	20–36	Ireland	Newcastle International Sports Centre, Newcastle (Australia)
11 July 2026	Fiji	8–73	England	Hill Dickinson Stadium, Liverpool (England)
11 July 2026	South Africa	42–28	Scotland	Loftus Versfeld Stadium, Pretoria
11 July 2026	Argentina	35–21	Wales	Estadio San Juan del Bicentenario, San Juan

==== Round 3 ====
18 July 2026	New Zealand	40–21	Ireland	Eden Park, Auckland
18 July 2026	Japan	15–42	France	Japan National Stadium, Tokyo
18 July 2026	Australia	57–10	Italy	Perth Rectangular Stadium, Perth
18 July 2026	Fiji	17–33	Scotland	Murrayfield Stadium, Edinburgh (Scotland)
18 July 2026	South Africa	43–0	Wales	Kings Park Stadium, Durban
18 July 2026	Argentina	24–31	England	Estadio Único Madre de Ciudades, Santiago del Estero

=== Northern Hemisphere Series ===
Northern Hemisphere teams hosted all the matches.

==== Round 4 ====
6 November 2026	Ireland	42–12	Argentina	Aviva Stadium, Dublin
7 November 2026	Italy	7–66	South Africa	Juventus Stadium, Turin
7 November 2026	Scotland	21–43	New Zealand	Murrayfield Stadium, Edinburgh
7 November 2026	Wales	28–21	Japan	Millennium Stadium, Cardiff
7 November 2026	France	54–17	Fiji	Groupama Stadium, Lyon
8 November 2026	England	45–22	Australia	Twickenham Stadium, London

==== Round 5 ====
13 November 2026	France	21–19	South Africa	Stade de France, Paris
14 November 2026	Italy	14–19	Argentina	Stadio Luigi Ferraris, Genoa
14 November 2026	Wales	35–28	New Zealand	Millennium Stadium, Cardiff
14 November 2026	England	78–15	Japan	Twickenham Stadium, London
14 November 2026	Ireland	43–15	Fiji	Aviva Stadium, Dublin
15 November 2026	Scotland	15–12	Australia	Murrayfield Stadium, Edinburgh

==== Round 6 ====
21 November 2026	England	37–12	New Zealand	Twickenham Stadium, London
21 November 2026	Scotland	67–5	Japan	Murrayfield Stadium, Edinburgh
21 November 2026	Ireland	20–17	South Africa	Aviva Stadium, Dublin
21 November 2026	Italy	16–21	Fiji	Stadio Friuli, Udine
21 November 2026	Wales	26–29	Australia	Millennium Stadium, Cardiff
21 November 2026	France	45–17	Argentina	Stade de France, Paris

=== Finals ===
After the six rounds, a finals series will be contested over three days with each team matched against its equivalently ranked team in the other pool to decide placements. All finals in 2026 are to be held at Twickenham Stadium in London, from 27 to 29 November.

==== Matches ====
===== Eleventh place final =====
27 November 2026
16:40 GMT (UTC+0)

Italy	v	Fiji

Twickenham Stadium, London

===== Ninth place final =====
28 November 2026
13:10 GMT (UTC+0)

Wales	v	Japan

Twickenham Stadium, London

===== Seventh place final =====
29 November 2026
13:10 GMT (UTC+0)

Scotland	v	Argentina

Twickenham Stadium, London

===== Fifth place final =====
27 November 2026
20:10 GMT (UTC+0)

Ireland	v	Australia

Twickenham Stadium, London

===== Third place final =====
28 November 2026
16:40 GMT (UTC+0)

England	v	New Zealand

Twickenham Stadium, London

===== Nations Championship Final =====
29 November 2026
16:40 GMT (UTC+0)

France	v	South Africa

Twickenham Stadium, London

== Leading scorers ==
As of 21 November 2026

=== Most points ===
Pos.	Name	Team	Pts.
1	Maxime Lucu	France	53
2	Fin Smith	England	44
3	Tomás Albornoz	Argentina	43
4	Sam Prendergast	Ireland	40
5	Takurō Matsunaga	Japan	37
5	Sacha Feinberg-Mngomezulu	South Africa	37
7	Sam Costelow	Wales	32
8	Ruben Love	New Zealand	31
9	Will Jordan	New Zealand	30
9	Ryan Lonergan	Australia	30

=== Most tries ===
Pos.	Name	Team	Tries
1	Will Jordan	New Zealand	6
2	Will Joseph	England	5
2	Hugo Keenan	Ireland	5
2	Malcolm Marx	South Africa	5
2	Henry Pollock	England	5
6	Théo Attissogbe	France	4
6	Robert Baloucoune	Ireland	4
6	Josh Canham	Australia	4
6	Mateo Carreras	Argentina	4
6	Ben Earl	England	4
6	Aaron Grandidier-Nkanang	France	4
6	Tevita Ikanivere	Fiji	4
6	Dewi Lake	Wales	4

== Discipline ==
=== Summary ===
As of 21 November 2026

Team	Yellow card	Red card	Total
Argentina	10	1	11
England	7	0	7
France	6	0	6
South Africa	3	2	5
Fiji	4	1	5
Japan	4	1	5
Australia	5	0	5
Italy	2	2	4
New Zealand	4	0	4
Ireland	3	0	3
Scotland	2	0	2
Wales	2	0	2

=== Red cards ===
- (Argentina) Mayco Vivas (vs. France)
- (Fiji) Simione Kuruvoli (vs. England)
- (Italy) Lorenzo Cannone (vs. New Zealand)
- (Italy) Marco Riccioni (vs. Australia)
- (Japan) Harry Hockings (vs. England)
- (South Africa) Jasper Wiese (vs. France)
- (South Africa) Marco van Staden (vs. Ireland)

=== Yellow cards ===
- (Australia) Angus Bell (vs. England)
- (Australia) Billy Pollard (vs. Scotland)
- (Australia) Lachlan Shaw (vs. Ireland)
- (Australia) Tom Wright (vs. France)
- (Australia) Harry Wilson (vs. Wales)
- (Argentina) Tomás Albornoz (vs. Italy)
- (Argentina) Mateo Carreras (vs. England)
- (Argentina) Santiago Carreras (vs. England)
- (Argentina) Efrain Elias (vs. Ireland)
- (Argentina) Efrain Elias (vs. Italy)
- (Argentina) Julián Montoya (vs. France)
- (Argentina) Joaquín Moro (vs. Scotland)
- (Argentina) Joaquín Oviedo (vs. England)
- (Argentina) Justo Piccardo (vs. Ireland)
- (Argentina) Joel Sclavi (vs. Italy)
- (England) Alex Coles (vs. Argentina)
- (England) Luke Cowan-Dickie (vs. Japan)
- (England) Tommy Freeman (vs. South Africa)
- (England) Emmanuel Iyogun (vs. Argentina)
- (England) Guy Pepper (vs. South Africa)
- (England) Henry Pollock (vs. Argentina)
- (England) Jack van Poortvliet (vs. Argentina)
- (Fiji) Levani Botia (vs. England)
- (Fiji) Inoke Ravuiwasa (vs. Ireland)
- (Fiji) Lekima Tagitagivalu (vs. Scotland)
- (Fiji) Mesake Vocevoce (vs. France)
- (France) Marko Gazzotti (vs. Japan)
- (France) Aaron Grandidier-Nkanang (vs. South Africa)
- (France) Matthieu Jalibert (vs. Japan)
- (France) Maxime Lucu (vs. South Africa)
- (France) Emmanuel Meafou (vs. Australia)
- (France) Régis Montagne (vs. South Africa)
- (Ireland) Tadhg Beirne (vs. Fiji)
- (Ireland) Sam Illo (vs. Argentina)
- (Ireland) Dan Sheehan (vs. South Africa)
- (Italy) Muhamed Hasa (vs. South Africa)
- (Italy) Enoch Opoku-Gyamfi (vs. Argentina)
- (Japan) Hayate Era (vs. Ireland)
- (Japan) Harry Hockings (vs. France)
- (Japan) Mamoru Harada (vs. Scotland)
- (Japan) Mike Stolberg (vs. Scotland)
- (New Zealand) Luke Jacobson (vs. Ireland)
- (New Zealand) Peter Lakai (vs. Scotland)
- (New Zealand) Ruben Love (vs. France)
- (New Zealand) Wallace Sititi (vs. Scotland)
- (South Africa) Kurt-Lee Arendse (vs. England)
- (South Africa) Lood de Jager (vs. France)
- (South Africa) Ben-Jason Dixon (vs. Scotland)
- (Scotland) Jamie Dobie (vs. Argentina)
- (Scotland) Sione Tuipulotu (vs. New Zealand)
- (Wales) Max Llewellyn (vs. Australia)
- (Wales) Ben Warren (vs. South Africa)

== See also ==
- 2026 men's rugby union internationals
- 2026 Six Nations Championship
- 2026 Nations Cup
- 2026 WXV Global Series
