= Liam McConnell =

Scottish rugby union player (born 2004)

- Born: 24 June 2004 (age 22) Edinburgh, Scotland
- Height: 1.94 m (6 ft 4 in)
- Weight: 112 kg (247 lb)

Rugby union career
- Position: Flanker
- Current team: Edinburgh Rugby
Senior career
Years	Team	Apps	(Points)
2024-	Edinburgh Rugby	9	
International career
Years	Team	Apps	(Points)
2022-24	Scotland U20	12	
2024	Scotland A	1	
2024	Emerging Scotland	1	
2025-	Scotland	2	

Liam McConnell (born 24 June 2004) is a Scotland international rugby union player who plays for Edinburgh Rugby. His preferred position is flanker.

== Club career ==
In December 2024, McConnell made his debut for Edinburgh Rugby against Gloucester Rugby in the EPCR Challenge Cup. In January 2025, he started for the club in the United Rugby Championship for the first time in their match against Scarlets.

At the start of the 2025-26 season, he started against Zebre in the United Rugby Championship, scoring a try in a 31-28 defeat.

== International career ==
McConnell captained the Scotland national under-20 rugby union team at the 2023 U20 Six Nations Championship. He captained Scotland to the World Rugby U20 Trophy on home soil in Edinburgh in 2024. He made his Scotland 'A' debut coming on as a replacement for Ben Muncaster after 62 minutes in the match against Chile on 23 November 2024. In December 2024, he played as captain for Emerging Scotland against Italy U23.

In October 2025, he was named in the senior Scotland squad for the Autumn internationals. He made his full international debut on 1 November 2025 against the USA at Murrayfield, in an 85-0 win.

On his third test appearance, he scored a hat-trick of tries in a 67-5 victory over Japan at Murrayfield in the inaugural Nations Championship on 21 November 2026.
