= 2026 Nations Championship Finals =

International rugby union tournament

The 2026 Nations Championship Finals will be the third and final phase of matches in the inaugural edition of the Nations Championship, a biennial international men's rugby union competition between the Six Nations teams, SANZAAR, Fiji and Japan.

The finals will take place between on 27, 28, and 29 November 2026 and all games will be held at Twickenham Stadium in Southwest London.

During the first and second phase of the Nations Championship, teams from the Six Nations were placed into a pool and they faced off against teams from SANZAAR, Fiji, and Japan who were also placed in a pool. For the finals, each team will be matched against its equivalently ranked team in the other pool to decide placements.

== Championship division: Tables ==
The below shows the tables for the two conferences.

=== Southern Hemisphere ===
Pos	Team	Pld	W	D	L	PF	PA	PD	TF	TA	TB	LB	Pts
1	South Africa	6	4	0	2	232	97	+135	34	14	4	2	22
2	New Zealand	6	4	0	2	204	163	+41	31	22	5	1	22
3	Australia	6	2	0	4	177	171	+6	27	26	4	2	14
4	Argentina	6	2	0	4	145	200	−55	20	30	2	1	11
5	Japan	6	1	0	5	103	261	−158	13	40	0	1	5
6	Fiji	6	1	0	5	102	258	−156	14	38	0	0	4

Updated to match(es) played on 15 November 2026 (after England–New Zealand and Scotland–Japan). Source: Nations Championship Rugby

In the event that two or more teams are tied on number of points, the tie is broken via:

1. Matches won
2. Points difference (total scored – total conceded)
3. Tries difference (tries scored – tries conceded)
4. Tries scored
5. Coin toss.

=== Northern Hemisphere ===
Pos	Team	Pld	W	D	L	PF	PA	PD	TF	TA	TB	LB	Pts
1	France	6	5	0	1	236	128	+108	34	18	5	1	26
2	England	6	5	0	1	285	126	+159	44	18	5	0	25
3	Ireland	6	5	0	1	195	135	+60	29	20	4	0	24
4	Scotland	6	4	0	2	211	157	+54	32	24	4	0	20
5	Wales	6	3	0	3	149	180	−31	22	26	4	1	17
6	Italy	6	0	0	6	74	237	−163	9	34	0	2	2

Updated to match(es) played on 15 November 2026 (after England–New Zealand and Scotland–Japan). Source: Nations Championship Rugby

== Matches ==
=== Eleventh place final ===
27 November 2026
16:40 GMT (UTC+0)

Italy	v	Fiji

Twickenham Stadium, London

=== Ninth place final ===
28 November 2026
13:10 GMT (UTC+0)

Wales	v	Japan

Twickenham Stadium, London

=== Seventh place final ===
29 November 2026
13:10 GMT (UTC+0)

Scotland	v	Argentina

Twickenham Stadium, London

=== Fifth place final ===
27 November 2026
20:10 GMT (UTC+0)

Ireland	v	Australia

Twickenham Stadium, London

=== Third place final ===
28 November 2026
16:40 GMT (UTC+0)

England	v	New Zealand

Twickenham Stadium, London

=== Nations Championship Final ===
29 November 2026
16:40 GMT (UTC+0)

France	v	South Africa

Twickenham Stadium, London
