= Juan Martín Scelzo =

Argentine rugby union player (born 2002)

- Born: 12 February 2002 (age 24) Narbonne, France
- Height: 192 cm (6 ft 4 in)
- Weight: 110 kg (243 lb; 17 st 5 lb)
- Notable relative: Martín Scelzo (father)

Rugby union career
- Position: Flanker / Number 8
- Current team: Stade Français Paris
Senior career
Years	Team	Apps	(Points)
2022–	Stade Français Paris	33	(20)
- Correct as of 31 August 2026
International career
Years	Team	Apps	(Points)
2026–	Argentina	1	(0)
- Correct as of 31 August 2026

Juan Martín Scelzo (born 12 February 2002) is an Argentine rugby union player, who plays for Stade Français Paris. His preferred position is flanker or Number 8.

== Early career ==
Scelzo was born in Narbonne, France, while his father Martín was playing for Narbonne. He began his rugby union career in the academy of Clermont. In 2022, he was called into the Argentina U20 squad.

== Professional career ==
Scelzo debuted for Stade Français Paris in November 2022, playing the match against Toulouse. He would make a further five appearances in the 2022/23 season. After this he suffered with injury problems, not making a first team appearance for 21 months, returning in October 2024. In March 2024, he had signed his first professional deal for the side.

In July 2026, Scelzo was named in the Argentina squad for their upcoming tests. He made his debut on 8 August against South Africa, coming on as a replacement.
