= Greg Fisilau =

English rugby union player

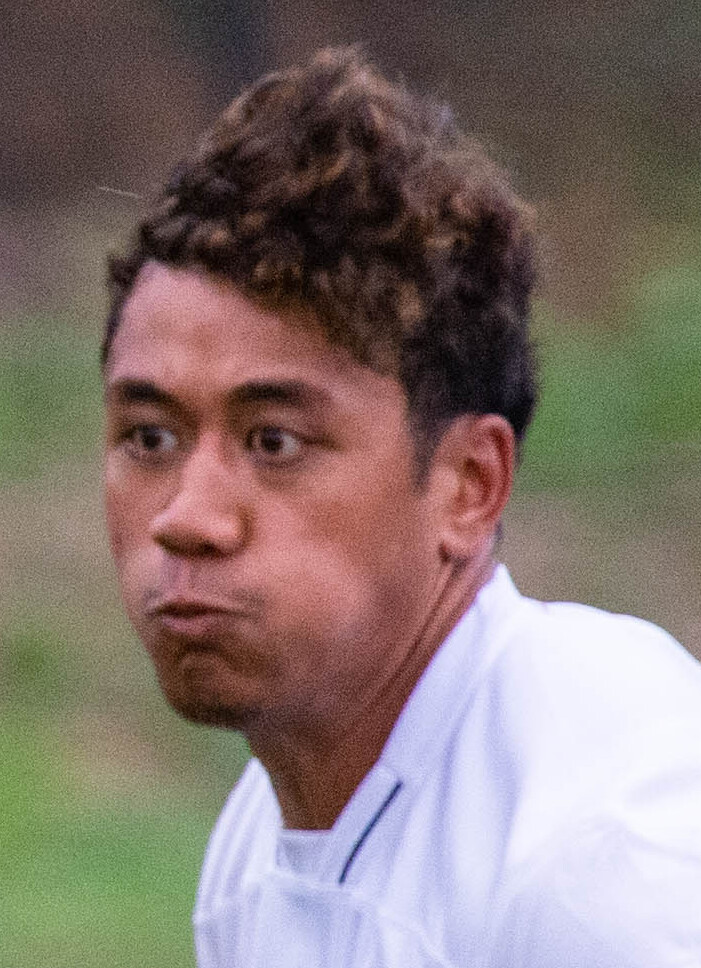
- Born: 9 July 2003 (age 23) Plymouth, England
- Height: 1.88 m (6 ft 2 in)
- Weight: 109 kg (17.2 st; 240 lb)
- School: St Edward's School
- Notable relative: Kenni Fisilau (father)

Rugby union career
- Position: Back-row
Senior career
Years	Team	Apps	(Points)
2021–2022	Wasps	4	(5)
2021–2022	→ Moseley (loan)	10	(20)
2022–	Exeter Chiefs	87	(115)
- Correct as of 31 October 2026
International career
Years	Team	Apps	(Points)
2022–2023	England U20	14	(5)
2024–	England A	5	(15)
2026–	England	2	(5)
- Correct as of 15 November 2026

Greg Fisilau (born 9 July 2003) is an English professional rugby union player who plays as a back row for PREM Rugby club Exeter Chiefs and the England national team.

== Early and personal life ==
Fisilau was brought up in Plymouth, the son of former Plymouth Albion centre and Tonga international Kenni Fisilau and his wife, Kimela. He started playing rugby union for Devonport Services in his hometown at U8 level. Fisilau received a scholarship to Caldicott School in Buckinghamshire and developed his skills there and later at St Edward's School, Oxford before joining Wasps Academy. He has brothers called Makobilly and David, and two sisters named Lisia and Malieta.

== Club career ==
Fisilau came through the academy at Wasps RFC, and also played on loan for Birmingham Moseley Rugby, making his debut against Plymouth Albion at The Brickfields. He also played on loan for Ampthill RUFC in the Rugby Championship.

Fisilau joined Exeter Chiefs in November 2022 upon the dissolution of Wasps for financial reasons. Exeter had a long standing interest in the player and coach Rob Baxter suggested they would have made an approach to him even if Wasps had not suffered the financial demise. He was said to have an “assured start” to his career at Exeter, and became a regular in the Chiefs first team in the 2023-24 season. He was nominated for the Premiership Rugby Player of the Month for October 2023.

On 8 March 2026, Fisilau was a try scorer as Exeter defeated Northampton Saints 31–14 to earn a place in the final of the 2025–26 PREM Rugby Cup. He was not selected in the final which saw them lose against Leicester Tigers. Later that season he scored a try during their play-off victory over Bath. Fisilau started in the final as Exeter were defeated by Northampton to finish league runners-up.

== International career ==
Fisilau represented England U20 making his debut in the opening round of the 2022 Six Nations Under 20s Championship against Scotland. He was also a member of the squad that finished fourth at the 2023 World Rugby U20 Championship.

In February 2024 Fisilau scored a try for England A in a victory over Portugal. In May 2024, he was called up by coach Steve Borthwick to an England senior team training squad. Fisilau was selected for the England A squad again in November 2025.

In January 2026, Fisilau was called up to the senior England squad ahead of the 2026 Six Nations. Later that year he was included in the squad for the conclusion of the 2026 Nations Championship. On 8 November 2026, Fisilau made his Test debut coming on as a substitute during their victory against Australia. The following weekend, he scored his try, off the bench, in a 78–15 victory over Japan.

=== List of international tries ===
No.	Date	Venue	Opponent	Score	Result	Competition
1	14 November 2026	Twickenham Stadium, London, England	Japan		78–15	2026 Nations Championship

as of 14 November 2026
