= Alessandro Ortombina =

International Italian rugby union player (born 2002)

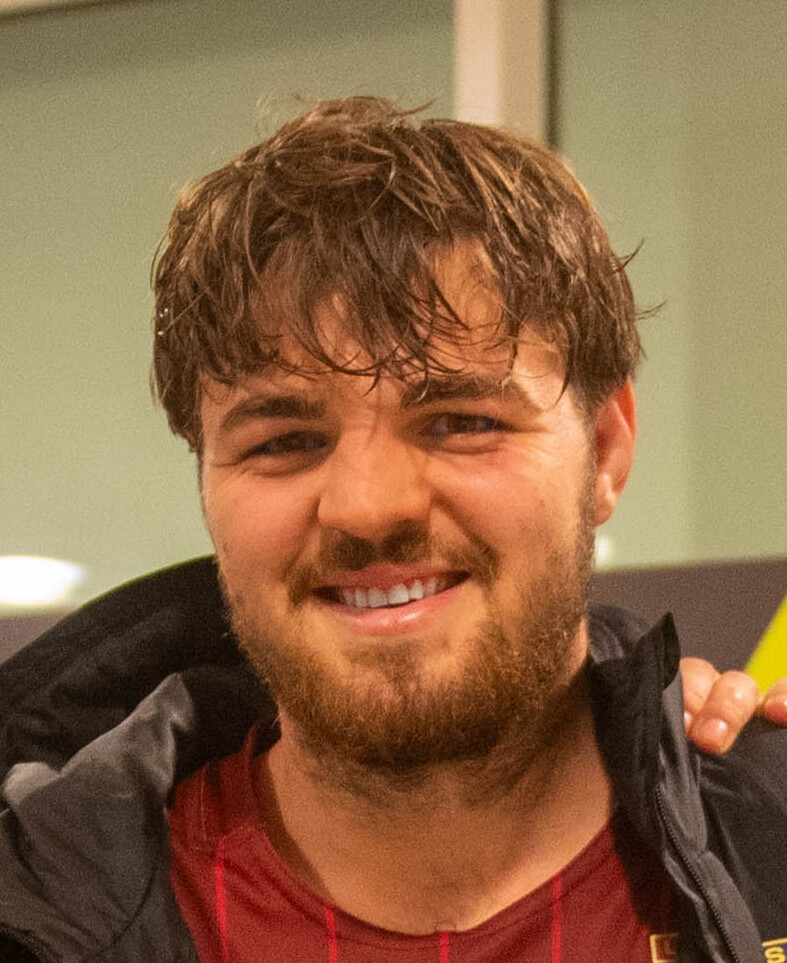
- Born: 5 October 2002 (age 24) Peschiera del Garda, Italy
- Height: 1.96 m (6 ft 5 in)
- Weight: 114 kg (18.0 st; 251 lb)

Rugby union career
- Position(s): Lock, Flanker
- Current team: Zebre Parma
Youth career
- Valpolicella
- Verona
- Valorugby Emilia
Senior career
Years	Team	Apps	(Points)
2021−2023	Valorugby Emilia		
2023−2025	Perpignan	6	(0)
2025−	Zebre Parma	20	(0)
- Correct as of 9 Aug 2026
International career
Years	Team	Apps	(Points)
2021−2022	Italy U20	9	(10)
2026	Italy XV	2	(0)
2026−	Italy	2	(0)
- Correct as of 9 Aug 2026

Alessandro Ortombina (born 5 October 2002) is an Italian rugby union player, who plays for Zebre Parma in United Rugby Championship. He usually plays lock or flanker.

== Club career ==
Ortombina started playing rugby for Valpolicella. During his youth years, he also played for Verona Rugby and Valorugby Emilia.

In 2023, he signed with the Espoirs team of Perpignan, where he made his professional debut in December 2024 against Cheetahs in a 20-20 draw in Amsterdam during the 2024–25 EPCR Challenge Cup.

After two seasons in Perpignan, before he could achieve JIFF status (joueurs issus des filières de formation), he moved back to Italy in the summer of 2025 to play in United Rugby Championship for Zebre Parma.

== International career ==
In 2022, Ortombina was named in Italy U20s squad for annual Six Nations Under 20s Championship. In the same year, he also participated in the U20 Summer Series, that took place instead of the World Rugby U20 Championship, since it was cancelled due to the COVID-19 pandemic. On 10 January 2023, he was named in Italy A squad for a uncapped test against Romania A. On 28 January 2026 he was selected by Massimo Brunello to be part of an Italy XV squad for two official tests against Scotland A and Chile during 2026 men's rugby union internationals window of spring.
