= Kenni Fisilau =

Tongan rugby union player

- Born: May 4, 1976 (age 50)
- Height: 5 ft 8 in (1.73 m)
- Weight: 198 lb (90 kg; 14.1 st)
- Notable relative: Greg Fisilau (son)

Rugby union career
- Position: Centre
Amateur team(s)
Years	Team	Apps	(Points)
2013-	Oxford Harlequins		
Senior career
Years	Team	Apps	(Points)
2001- 2013	Plymouth Albion R.F.C.	200	
International career
Years	Team	Apps	(Points)
1999-2005	Tonga	6	(0)

Keni Fisilau is a retired Tongan rugby union player. He played a majority of his career for the English club Plymouth Albion Rugby Football Club in the RFU Championship. Fisilau made his debut for Tonga in 1999 against Japan. He last played for Tonga against Italy in 2005.
