= 2023–24 EPCR Challenge Cup pool stage =

European Rugby Challenge Cup pool stage

The 2023–24 EPCR Challenge Cup pool stage was the first stage of the 10th season of the EPCR Challenge Cup.

== Structure ==
The pool stage draw took place on 21 June 2023. The complete fixture list was then announced on 13 July 2023. Teams in the same pool played other teams in the same pool, either at home or away, in the group stage. The top four teams in each pool progressed to the round of 16 as well as the fifth-ranked team from each Champions Cup pool.

Teams were awarded group points based on match performances; four points for a win, two points for a draw, one attacking bonus point for scoring four or more tries in a match and one defensive bonus point for losing a match by seven points or fewer.

In the event of a tie between two or more teams, the following tie-breakers were used, as directed by European Professional Club Rugby:

1. Where teams have played each other
  1. The club with the greater number of competition points from only matches involving tied teams.
  2. If equal, the club with the best aggregate points difference from those matches.
  3. If equal, the club that scored the most tries in those matches.
2. Where teams remain tied and/or have not played each other in the competition (i.e. are from different pools)
  1. The club with the best aggregate points difference from the pool stage.
  2. If equal, the club that scored the most tries in the pool stage.
  3. If equal, the club with the fewest players suspended in the pool stage.
  4. If equal, the drawing of lots will determine a club's ranking.

== Pools ==
Key to colours
Top 4 in each pool, advance to round of 16.

=== Pool 1 ===
2023–24 EPCR Challenge Cup Pool 1
Pos	Team	Pld	W	D	L	PF	PA	PD	TF	TA	TB	LB	Pts	Qualification
1	(South Africa) Sharks (1)	4	3	0	1	141	53	+88	21	6	4	1	17	Qualifies for a home Round of 16
2	(France) Pau (6)	4	3	0	1	90	113	−23	10	15	0	0	12	Qualifies for a home Round of 16
3	(South Africa) Cheetahs (13)	4	2	0	2	112	105	+7	14	13	2	1	11	Qualifies for Round of 16
4	(Italy) Zebre Parma (16)	4	2	0	2	83	92	−9	11	9	1	1	10	Qualifies for Round of 16
5	(Wales) Dragons	4	1	0	3	71	80	−9	7	12	1	2	7	
6	(France) Oyonnax	4	1	0	3	56	110	−54	8	16	1	1	6	

Source: EPCR

==== Round 1 ====
9 December 2023
14:00

Zebre Parma (Italy)	15–33	(South Africa) Cheetahs
Try: Fusco 77' m Gesi 80+1' c Con: Prisciantelli (1/2) 80+1'; Pen: Eden (1/1) 29'	Report	Try: Jasper 35' c Fortuin 43' c Van der Westhuizen 61' c Con: Pienaar (3/3) 36', 44', 62'; Pen: Pienaar (4/4) 3', 34', 40', 54'

Stadio Sergio Lanfranchi, Parma
Attendance: 1,600
Referee: Jack Makepeace (England)

9 December 2023
17:15

(1 BP) Sharks (South Africa)	45–5	(France) Pau
Try: Am (2) 8' c, 24' c Etzebeth (2) 40' c, 46' c Potgieter 41' c Mapimpi 49' c Con: Bosch (6/6) 9', 25', 40+1', 42', 47', 51'; Pen: Bosch (1/2) 31'	Report	Try: Arfeuil 14' m

Kings Park Stadium, Durban
Attendance: 11,724
Referee: Gianluca Gnecchi (Italy)

9 December 2023
20:00

(1 BP) Dragons (Wales)	24–7	(France) Oyonnax
Try: Hewitt 43' c J. Davies 73' m Dyer (2) 76' m, 80' c Con: Reed (2/4) 44', 80+1'	Report	Try: Treilles 21' c Con: Soulan (1/1) 22'

Rodney Parade, Newport
Attendance: 3,057
Referee: Eoghan Cross (Ireland)

==== Round 2 ====
16 December 2023
14:00

(1 BP) Oyonnax (France)	14–21	(Italy) Zebre Parma
Try: Durand-Pradere 39' c Sweetnam 52' c Con: Bouraux (2/2) 40', 53'	Report	Try: Canali 54' m García 57' c Con: Prisciantelli (1/2) 58'; Pen: Prisciantelli (3/3) 4', 64', 79'

Stade Charles-Mathon, Oyonnax
Attendance: 5,100
Referee: Hamish Smales (England)

16 December 2023
18:30

Pau (France)	24–21	(Wales) Dragons (1 BP)
Try: Ruffenach 27' c Hamonou 40' c Attissogbe 80' c Con: Desperes (3/3) 28', 40+1', 80+1'; Pen: Desperes (1/2) 55'	Report	Try: Benjamin 28' m Young 69' c Con: Evans (1/2) 71'; Pen: Evans (3/3) 21', 25', 49'

Stade du Hameau, Pau
Attendance: 5,348
Referee: Federico Vedovelli (Italy)

17 December 2023
15:00

(1 BP) Cheetahs (South Africa)	32–29	(South Africa) Sharks (2 BP)
Try: M. van der Merwe 16' c G. van der Merwe 28' m Maartens 62' c Jasper 74' c Con: Pienaar (3/4) 18', 62', 75'; Pen: Pienaar (2/2) 40', 44'	Report	Try: Etzebeth 21' c F. Venter 41' m Williams 54' c Mapimpi 64' c Con: Bosch (3/4) 23', 55', 65'; Pen: Bosch (1/2) 58'

Free State Stadium, Bloemfontein
Attendance: 7,190
Referee: Andrea Piardi (Italy)

==== Round 3 ====
13 January 2024
15:00

(1 BP) Sharks (South Africa)	38–7	(France) Oyonnax
Try: Nché (2) 8' c, 20' m Mapimpi (2) 33' c, 58' c Am 48' m Labuschagné 52' c Con: Bosch (4/6) 10', 35', 53', 59'	Report	Try: Berthaud 44' c Con: Bouraux (1/1) 45'

Kings Park Stadium, Durban
Attendance: 13,624
Referee: Adam Leal (England)

13 January 2024
16:15

Zebre Parma (Italy)	20–17	(Wales) Dragons (1 BP)
Try: Gesi (2) 25' m, 51' m Bianchi 43' c Con: Montemauri (1/3) 44'; Pen: Montemauri (1/1) 34'	Report	Try: J. Rosser 57' m Pen: Evans (4/5) 5', 12', 16', 21'

Stadio Sergio Lanfranchi, Parma
Attendance: 1,900
Referee: Benoit Rousselet (France)

14 January 2024
14:00

Cheetahs (South Africa)	20–33	(France) Pau
Try: Hartzenberg 30' m Pienaar 38' c L. Van der Westhuizen 57' m Con: Pienaar (1/3) 31', 38', 57'; Pen: Pienaar 71'	Report	Try: Maddocks 10' c Gailleton 13' c Robson 74' c Con: Desperes (3/3) 10', 14', 75'; Pen: Desperes (4/5) 35', 44', 63', 68'

NRCA Stadium, Amsterdam
Attendance: 4,500
Referee: Hollie Davidson (Scotland)

==== Round 4 ====
20 January 2024
14:00

Pau (France)	28–27	(Italy) Zebre Parma (2 BP)
Try: Tuimaba (2) 32' c, 36' m Simmonds 55' c Con: Simmonds (2/3) 33', 56'; Pen: Simmonds (3/4) 1', 15', 68'	Report	Try: Zambonin 8' c Gesi (2) 42' c, 77' m García 49' m Con: Montemauri (2/4) 8', 44'; Pen: Prisciantelli (1/1) 73'

Stade du Hameau, Pau
Attendance: 5,612
Referee: Ben Whitehouse (Wales)

20 January 2024
16:15

(1 BP) Oyonnax (France)	28–27	(South Africa) Cheetahs (2 BP)
Try: Godener 31' c Taofifenua 39' c Odiase 62' c Bordenave 80+7'; Con: Miotti (2/2) 32', 40'; Soulan (2/2) 63', 80+9'	Report	Try: Hartzenberg 8' m M. van der Merwe (2) 16' c, 42' m Pienaar 22' c Con: Pienaar (2/4) 17', 23'; Pen: Pienaar (1/1) 35'

Stade Charles-Mathon, Oyonnax
Attendance: 6,801
Referee: Anthony Woodthorpe (England)

21 January 2024
17:30

Dragons (Wales)	9–29	(South Africa) Sharks (1 BP)
Pen: Evans (3/3) 7', 21', 59'	Report	Try: Hendrikse 35' c Nché 40' m Grobler 70' m Roets 76' c Kok 79' m Con: Bosch (2/4) 35', 77'

Rodney Parade, Newport
Attendance: 3,835
Referee: Adrien Marbot (France)

=== Pool 2 ===
2023–24 EPCR Challenge Cup Pool 2
Pos	Team	Pld	W	D	L	PF	PA	PD	TF	TA	TB	LB	Pts	Qualification
1	(Italy) Benetton Rugby (3)	4	3	0	1	147	87	+60	19	12	3	0	15	Qualifies for a home Round of 16
2	(France) Montpellier (5)	4	3	0	1	94	54	+40	15	7	2	0	14	Qualifies for a home Round of 16
3	(Wales) Ospreys (7)	4	3	0	1	111	103	+8	15	14	2	0	14	Qualifies for a home Round of 16 as 3rd best
4	(South Africa) Lions (14)	4	2	0	2	94	76	+18	10	8	2	0	10	Qualifies for Round of 16
5	(England) Newcastle Falcons	4	1	0	3	82	139	−57	8	20	0	1	5	
6	(France) Perpignan	4	0	0	4	45	114	−69	4	10	0	0	0	

Source: EPCR

==== Round 1 ====
9 December 2023
17:30

(1 BP) Ospreys (Wales)	43–34	(Italy) Benetton (1 BP)
Try: Lake (4) 7' c, 26' c, 46' c, 56' m G. Thomas 17' c M. Morris 76' c Con: O. Williams (4/5) 8', 19', 27', 48'; Walsh (1/1) 77'; Pen: Walsh (1/1) 80+1'	Report	Try: Ratave (2) 14' c, 21' c Negri 34' c Odogwu 51' c Con: Umaga (4/4) 15', 23', 35', 52'; Pen: Umaga (2/3) 40', 79'

Swansea.com Stadium, Swansea
Attendance: 3,335
Referee: Ludovic Cayre (France)

10 December 2023
14:00

Perpignan (France)	12–28	(South Africa) Lions
Pen: Barraque (4/5) 6', 18', 30', 35'	Report	Try: Maxwane 9' c Con: Hendrikse (1/1) 10'; Pen: Hendrikse (7/8) 2', 33', 43', 46', 60', 64', 68'

Stade Aimé Giral, Perpignan
Attendance: 5,532
Referee: Adam Leal (England)

10 December 2023
17:30

(1 BP) Newcastle Falcons (England)	19–24	(France) Montpellier (1 BP)
Try: Chick 50' m Stephens 54' c Blamire 74' c Con: Jennings (1/2) 55'; Johnson (1/1) 75'	Report	Try: Becognee 13' c Lam 25' m Bouthier 41' m Simmonds 63' c Con: Carbonel (2/4) 14', 64'

Kingston Park, Newcastle
Attendance: 3,802
Referee: Sam Grove-White (Scotland)

==== Round 2 ====
16 December 2023
16:15

(1 BP) Benetton (Italy)	29–7	(France) Perpignan
Try: Smith (2) 15' c, 80' m Bernasconi 36' c Izekor 48' c Con: Umaga (3/3) 17', 37', 50'; Pen: Umaga (1/1) 32'	Report	Try: Montgaillard 75' c Con: Rodor (1/1) 76'

Stadio Comunale di Monigo, Treviso
Attendance: 3,854
Referee: Eoghan Cross (Ireland)

16 December 2023
17:15

(1 BP) Lions (South Africa)	35–13	(England) Newcastle Falcons
Try: Botha 18' c JP Smith 28' c Tshituka (2) 50' c, 76' c Louw 69' c Con: Nohamba (5/5) 19', 29', 51', 70', 78'	Report	Try: Lockwood 58' c Con: Connon (1/1) 59'; Pen: Connon (2/2) 8', 32'

Ellis Park Stadium, Johannesburg
Attendance: 2,515
Referee: Benoit Rousselet (France)

17 December 2023
17:15

(1 BP) Montpellier (France)	38–5	(Wales) Ospreys
Try: Bridge (2) 10' c, 21' m Coly 31' c Karkadze 57' c Cadot (2) 65' c, 76' m Con: Garbisi (3/4) 11', 32', 59'; Foursans-Bourdette (1/2) 66'	Report	Try: Morgan-Williams 49' m

GGL Stadium, Montpellier
Attendance: 6,500
Referee: Anthony Woodthorpe (England)

==== Round 3 ====
12 January 2024
20:30

Newcastle Falcons (England)	18–57	(Italy) Benetton (1 BP)
Try: Bello 12' c McCallum 62' m Con: Connon (1/2) 13'; Pen: Connon (2/3) 4', 24'	Report	Try: Albornoz 16' m Ratave (2) 19' c, 43' c Menoncello (2) 27' c, 56' c Mendy 49' c Izekor 73' c Umaga 80' c Con: Albornoz (4/5) 20', 28', 44', 50'; Umaga (3/3) 56', 74', 80+1'; Pen: Albornoz (1/1) 34'

Kingston Park, Newcastle
Attendance: 3,602
Referee: Tual Trainini (France)

12 January 2024
20:00

Ospreys (Wales)	25–3	(France) Perpignan
Try: Hopkins (2) 40' m, 50' c Giles 62' c Con: D. Edwards (2/3) 51', 63'; Pen: D. Edwards (2/2) 34', 43'	Report	Pen: McIntyre (1/2) 45'

Swansea.com Stadium, Swansea
Attendance: 4,571
Referee: Morné Ferreira (South Africa)

13 January 2024
21:00

Montpellier (France)	13–3	(South Africa) Lions
Try: Doumayrou 43' m Willemse 72' m Pen: Garbisi (1/3) 49'	Report	Pen: Hendrikse (1/1) 31'

GGL Stadium, Montpellier
Attendance: 7,500
Referee: Sam Grove-White (Scotland)

==== Round 4 ====
20 January 2024
16:15

Benetton (Italy)	27–19	(France) Montpellier
Try: Albornoz (2) 20' c, 72' c Ratave 29' c Con: Albornoz (2/2) 22', 29'; Umaga (1/1) 74'; Pen: Albornoz (2/2) 14', 60'	Report	Try: Cadot 35' m Erdocio 47' c Karkadze 67' c Con: Garbisi (1/2) 48'; Foursans-Bourdette (1/1) 69'

Stadio Comunale di Monigo, Treviso
Attendance: 4,792
Referee: Morné Ferreira (South Africa)

21 January 2024
14:00

Perpignan (France)	23–32	(England) Newcastle Falcons
Try: Granell 25' m Dubois 34' m Dupichot 75' c Con: Barraque (1/1) 75'; Pen: Rodor (2/4) 1', 52'	Report	Try: O'Sullivan 53' c Redshaw 66' c Con: Johnson (2/2) 53', 66'; Pen: Johnson (6/6) 4', 14', 18', 65', 70', 74'

Stade Aimé Giral, Perpignan
Attendance: 6,821
Referee: Federico Vedovelli (Italy)

21 January 2024
15:00

(1 BP) Lions (South Africa)	28–38	(Wales) Ospreys (1 BP)
Try: Louw (2) 16' m, 39' m Pretorius 35' m van den Berg 55' c Con: Nohamba (1/4) 56'; Pen: Nohamba (2/2) 9', 49'	Report	Try: Watkin 14' c North 24' c Giles 72' c C.D. Jones 74' c Morse 78' c Con: D. Edwards (2/2) 15', 25'; Walsh (3/3) 73', 76', 79'; Pen: D. Edwards (1/1) 53'

Ellis Park Stadium, Johannesburg
Attendance: 3,321
Referee: Jeremy Rozier (France)

=== Pool 3 ===
2023–24 EPCR Challenge Cup Pool 3
Pos	Team	Pld	W	D	L	PF	PA	PD	TF	TA	TB	LB	Pts	Qualification
1	(England) Gloucester (2)	4	4	0	0	99	52	+47	9	7	1	0	17	Qualifies for a home Round of 16
2	(France) Clermont (4)	4	3	0	1	122	66	+56	17	7	3	0	15	Qualifies for a home Round of 16
3	(Scotland) Edinburgh (8)	4	2	0	2	103	92	+11	15	12	2	1	11	Qualifies for a home Round of 16 as second 3rd best
4	(France) Castres (15)	4	2	0	2	88	91	−3	13	10	2	0	10	Qualifies for Round of 16
5	(Georgia (country)) Black Lion	4	1	0	3	42	86	−44	3	10	0	1	5	
6	(Wales) Scarlets	4	0	0	4	59	126	−67	7	18	0	0	0	

Source: EPCR

==== Round 1 ====
8 December 2023
21:00

(1 BP) Clermont (France)	31–18	(Scotland) Edinburgh
Try: Moala 24' c Newsome (2) 30' c, 61' c Biziwu 68' c Con: Belleau (4/4) 26', 31', 63', 69'; Pen: Belleau (1/1) 37'	Report	Try: Sebastian 42' c Goosen 75' m Con: Swiel (1/1) 43'; Pen: Swiel (1/1) 40+1'; Scott (1/1) 60'

Stade Marcel-Michelin, Clermont-Ferrand
Attendance: 13,385
Referee: Ben Whitehouse (Wales)

9 December 2023
16:00

(1 BP) Black Lion (Georgia (country))	10–15	(England) Gloucester
Try: Matkava 20' c Con: Matkava (1/1) 21'; Pen: Matkava (1/1) 68'	Report	Pen: Barton (5/5) 11', 17', 28', 48', 71'

Mikheil Meskhi Stadium, Tbilisi
Attendance: 6,332
Referee: Adam Jones (Wales)

9 December 2023
16:15

(1 BP) Castres (France)	34–16	(Wales) Scarlets
Try: Raisuqe 4' c Fernandez 31' m Papali'i 37' m Dumora 42' c Le Brun 65' c Con: Le Brun (3/5) 6', 43', 66'; Pen: Le Brun (1/1) 57'	Report	Try: Lloyd 50' c Con: Lloyd (1/1) 51'; Pen: Lloyd (3/3) 12', 16', 35'

Stade Pierre-Fabre, Castres
Attendance: 8,311
Referee: Nika Amashukeli (Georgia)

==== Round 2 ====
15 December 2023
20:00

Scarlets (Wales)	7–23	(Georgia (country)) Black Lion
Try: Fifita 3' c Con: Lloyd (1/1) 4'	Report	Try: Modebadze 33' c Mamrikashvili 58' c Con: Matkava (2/2) 34', 59'; Pen: Matkava (3/4) 26', 44', 73'

Parc y Scarlets, Llanelli
Attendance: 5,830
Referee: Jeremy Rozier (France)

15 December 2023
20:00

Gloucester (England)	28–17	(France) Clermont
Try: May 16' m Socino (2) 31' c, 36' c Con: Carreras (2/3) 32', 37'; Pen: Carreras (3/4) 40+2', 56', 68'	Report	Try: Jauneau 18' c Sowakula 58' c Con: Plisson (2/2) 19', 59'; Pen: Plisson (1/1) 13'

Kingsholm Stadium, Gloucester
Attendance: 9,481
Referee: Hollie Davidson (Scotland)

16 December 2023
13:00

(1 BP) Edinburgh (Scotland)	34–21	(France) Castres
Try: Goosen 5' m Van der Merwe (2) 17' m, 58' c Price 35' c Currie 37' c Con: Healy (3/5) 36', 38', 59'; Pen: Healy (1/1) 22'	Report	Try: Bouzerand 1' c De Benedittis 66' c Nakarawa 70' c Con: Popelin (1/1) 2'; Palis (1/1) 67'; Fernandez (1/1) 71'

Edinburgh Rugby Stadium, Edinburgh
Attendance: 6,206
Referee: Adam Jones (Wales)

==== Round 3 ====
13 January 2024
14:00

(1 BP) Clermont (France)	38–17	(Wales) Scarlets
Try: Raka (2) 27' c, 38' c Belleau (2) 33' m, 80+1' c Beria 42' c Jurand 46' m Con: Belleau (4/6) 29', 40', 44', 80+2'	Report	Try: ST. Evans 69' c Hardy 79' c Con: Lloyd (2/2) 70', 79'; Pen: Costelow (1/1) 32'

Stade Marcel-Michelin, Clermont-Ferrand
Attendance: 15,552
Referee: Eoghan Cross (Ireland)

13 January 2024
16:15

(1 BP) Castres (France)	28–6	(Georgia (country)) Black Lion
Try: Raisuqe 16' c Zarantonello 43' c Arata 62' c Colonna 77' c Con: Le Bruin (4/4) 18', 44', 63', 79'	Report	Pen: Matkava (2/2) 12', 47'

Stade Pierre-Fabre, Castres
Attendance: 8,965
Referee: Anthony Woodthorpe (England)

13 January 2024
17:30

(1 BP) Edinburgh (Scotland)	20–21	(England) Gloucester
Try: Young 22' m Ashman 61' m Vellacott 68' c Con: Healy (1/3) 69'; Pen: Healy (1/2) 51'	Report	Try: Rees-Zammit 45' m Mercer 73' c Con: Hastings (1/2) 74'; Pen: Hastings (3/3) 37', 53', 56'

Edinburgh Rugby Stadium, Edinburgh
Attendance: 7,774
Referee: Gianluca Gnecchi (Italy)

==== Round 4 ====
19 January 2024
20:00

(1 BP) Gloucester (England)	35–5	(France) Castres
Try: Atkinson 8' c Clarke 49' c Hastings 65' c Tuisue 71' m Con: Hastings (2/2) 9', 50'; Carreras (1/2) 67'; Pen: Hastings (2/2) 24', 60'; Carreras (1/1) 80'	Report	Try: Raisuqe 37' m

Kingsholm Stadium, Gloucester
Attendance: 10,176
Referee: Eoghan Cross (Ireland)

19 January 2024
20:00

Scarlets (Wales)	19–31	(Scotland) Edinburgh (1 BP)
Try: Roberts 14' m Conbeer 79' c Penalty Try 80'; Con: Lloyd (1/2) 79'	Report	Try: Vellacott 2' c Nel 6' c van der Merwe 20' m Watson 33' c Schoeman 43' m Con: Healy (3/5) 2', 7', 33'

Parc y Scarlets, Llanelli
Attendance: 5,993
Referee: Sara Cox (England)

20 January 2024
16:00

Black Lion (Georgia (country))	3–36	(France) Clermont (1 BP)
Pen: Matkava (1/2) 35'	Report	Try: Delguy (2) 24' c, 43' c Newsome 36' c Darricarrère 54' c Moala 60' m Con: Belleau (4/5) 24', 37', 45', 55'; Pen: Belleau (1/1) 3'

Mikheil Meskhi Stadium, Tbilisi
Attendance: 17,233
Referee: Gianluca Gnecchi (Italy)
