= 2021–22 United Rugby Championship =

- Countries: Ireland; Italy; Scotland; South Africa; Wales
- Date: 24 September 2021 – 18 June 2022
- Champions: (South Africa) Stormers (1st title)
- Runners-up: (South Africa) Bulls
- Matches played: 151
- Highest attendance: 32,411 Leinster vs. Munster (21 May 2022)
- Tries scored: 906 (average 6 per match)
- Top point scorer: (South Africa) Chris Smith (Bulls) 153
- Top try scorer: (South Africa) Leolin Zas (Stormers) (South Africa) Marcell Coetzee (Bulls) 11

Official website
- unitedrugby.com

The 2021–22 United Rugby Championship was the twenty-first season of the professional rugby union competition originally known as the Celtic League. It was the first season that the competition is referred to as the United Rugby Championship, having previously been known as the Pro14.

Sixteen teams competed in this season – four Irish teams: Connacht, Leinster, Munster and Ulster; two Italian teams: Benetton and Zebre Parma; two Scottish teams: Edinburgh and Glasgow Warriors (with Scottish and Italian teams in a shared regional pool); four South African teams: Bulls, Lions, Sharks and Stormers; and four Welsh teams: Cardiff, Dragons, Ospreys and Scarlets. It is the first season in which URC Regional Shields (Irish, Welsh, South African and Scottish-Italian) will be awarded as separate trophies to the leading sides in each nation or region.

== Format ==
The tournament consisted of 18 rounds. There are four regional pools: The Irish Shield pool (featuring the four Irish teams), the Welsh Shield pool (featuring the four Welsh teams), the South African Shield pool (featuring the four South African teams) and the Scottish/Italian 'Azzurri/Blue' Shield pool (featuring the two Italian and two Scottish sides). Teams play six matches against their regional pool rivals home and away. The remaining twelve matches are made up by a single round robin, consisting of an even number of six home and six away matches against all the sides from the other pools. There is only one main league table (the conference system used in previous Pro14 years has been dropped). The top eight sides in the table will qualify for the quarter-finals, followed by semi-finals and a grand final, with teams seeded 1 to 4 with home advantage for the lowest seeded side.

A total of eight sides qualified for the following season's European Rugby Champions Cup, while the remaining eight sides will play in the EPCR Challenge Cup. All points won in the competition contributed to rankings in the regional pools, with the top side in each regional pool automatically qualifying for the European Rugby Champions Cup. The remaining four places went then go to the highest ranked teams in the main table (who haven't already qualified). A similar format was used to determine playoff contenders in the Super Rugby competition. This will see the South African sides in the competition qualifying for a European competition for the first time (subject to finalisation of contract terms), as previous South African participants – the Cheetahs and Southern Kings – were ineligible for European competitions.

== Teams ==
=== United Rugby Championship ===
Team	Country	Coach / Director of Rugby	Captain	Stadium	Capacity
Benetton	Italy	(Italy) Marco Bortolami	(South Africa) Dewaldt Duvenage (Italy) Michele Lamaro	Stadio Comunale di Monigo	5,000
Bulls	South Africa	(South Africa) Jake White	(South Africa) Marcell Coetzee	Loftus Versfeld	51,762
Cardiff	Wales	(Wales) Dai Young	(Wales) Josh Turnbull	Cardiff Arms Park	12,125
Connacht	Ireland	(Australia) Andy Friend	(Ireland) Jack Carty	Galway Sportsgrounds	8,129
Dragons	Wales	(England) Dean Ryan	(Wales) Rhodri Williams	Rodney Parade	8,700
Edinburgh	Scotland	(Scotland) Mike Blair	(Scotland) Grant Gilchrist (Scotland) Stuart McInally	Edinburgh Rugby Stadium; Murrayfield Stadium	7,800; 67,144
Glasgow Warriors	Scotland	(England) Danny Wilson	(Scotland) Fraser Brown (Scotland) Ryan Wilson	Scotstoun Stadium	7,351
Leinster	Ireland	(Ireland) Leo Cullen	(Ireland) Johnny Sexton	RDS Arena	18,500
Lions	South Africa	(South Africa) Ivan van Rooyen	(South Africa) Burger Odendaal	Ellis Park Stadium	62,567
Munster	Ireland	(South Africa) Johann van Graan	(Ireland) Peter O'Mahony	Thomond Park; Musgrave Park	25,600; 8,008
Ospreys	Wales	(England) Toby Booth	(Wales) Justin Tipuric	Swansea.com Stadium	20,827
Scarlets	Wales	(Wales) Dwayne Peel	(Wales) Jonathan Davies	Parc y Scarlets	14,870
Sharks	South Africa	(South Africa) Sean Everitt	(South Africa) Lukhanyo Am (South Africa) Phepsi Buthelezi	Kings Park Stadium	52,000
Stormers	South Africa	(South Africa) John Dobson	(South Africa) Steven Kitshoff	DHL Stadium; Danie Craven Stadium	55,000; 16,000
Ulster	Ireland	(England) Dan McFarland	(Ireland) Iain Henderson	Ravenhill Stadium	18,196
Zebre Parma	Italy	(Italy) Fabio Roselli	(Italy) Giulio Bisegni	Stadio Sergio Lanfranchi	5,000

=== Locations ===
Location of Irish, Scottish and Welsh teams:	Location of Italian teams: Location of South African teams:

== Tables ==
=== URC – Regional Shields Pools Tables ===
The Regional Shield pools of the regular season are the primary mechanism by which teams qualify for European competition, with the 'Shield winner' of each regional pool guaranteed qualification for the European Rugby Champions Cup, ensuring at least one South African, one Welsh and one Irish side qualify for the premier European competition. As Scotland and Italy are sharing a single regional pool, at least one team from those two countries combined is also guaranteed entry, but neither country individually is so guaranteed.

The remaining four places will be awarded to those with the four best overall regular season records, regardless of which pool they take part in. As such, it is possible that a team will qualify for the ERCC without reaching the URC play-offs by topping its pool, but finishing ninth or lower overall; conversely, it is also possible that a team could win the entire URC championship from seventh or eighth seed in the overall championship table, but fail to qualify for the ERCC because teams below them topped their respective pools. Since each pool has only four teams, this means in effect that the top 6 in the overall table are guaranteed entry into the Champions Cup, with the final two places dependent on the placement of the two lowest ranked pool shield winners.

**2021–22 United Rugby Championship Regional Shield Pools**
**Irish Shield**
	Team	P	W	D	L	PF	PA	PD	TF	TA	TBP	LBP	Pts
1	(Ireland) **Leinster**	18	13	0	5	546	276	+270	73	31	11	4	67
2	(Ireland) Ulster	18	12	0	6	412	297	+115	52	34	7	4	59
3	(Ireland) Munster	18	11	0	7	524	341	+183	66	34	8	4	56
4	(Ireland) Connacht	18	9	0	9	399	502	–103	51	67	4	1	41
**Scottish/Italian Shield**
	Team	P	W	D	L	PF	PA	PD	TF	TA	TBP	LBP	Pts
1	**(Scotland) Edinburgh**	18	10	1	7	421	318	+103	55	37	8	4	54
2	(Scotland) Glasgow Warriors	18	10	0	8	409	376	+33	53	44	7	3	50
3	(Italy) Benetton	18	6	1	11	425	501	–76	53	67	6	3	35
4	(Italy) Zebre Parma	18	1	0	17	261	630	–369	32	90	2	3	9
**South African Shield**
	Team	P	W	D	L	PF	PA	PD	TF	TA	TBP	LBP	Pts
1	**(South Africa) Stormers**	18	12	2	4	464	311	+153	60	36	7	2	61
2	(South Africa) Bulls	18	11	0	7	518	388	+130	67	42	10	4	58
3	(South Africa) Sharks	18	11	1	6	510	365	+145	60	43	9	2	57
4	(South Africa) Lions	18	8	0	10	408	450	–42	48	55	7	2	41
**Welsh Shield**
	Team	P	W	D	L	PF	PA	PD	TF	TA	TBP	LBP	Pts
1	**(Wales) Ospreys**	18	10	0	8	422	474	–52	46	62	4	2	46
2	(Wales) Scarlets	18	8	0	10	494	534	–40	65	73	10	3	45
3	(Wales) Cardiff	18	7	0	11	369	577	–208	41	72	3	1	32
4	(Wales) Dragons	18	2	1	15	305	547	–242	36	71	3	6	19
If teams are level at any stage, tiebreakers are applied in the following order: 1. number of matches won 2. the difference between points for and points against 3. the number of tries scored 4. the most points scored 5. the difference between tries for and tries against 6. the fewest red cards received 7. the fewest yellow cards received
Green background indicates Shield winner teams guaranteed a place in the 2022–23 European Champions Cup; **Bold** : Regional Shield winner.

=== United Rugby Championship table ===
The overall United Rugby Championship table is the central pillar of the regular season, and the mechanism by which the teams qualifying for the Championship play-off bracket are decided. The top eight teams in the table at the end of the regular season, regardless of regional pool, qualify for the play-off quarter-finals, seeded in the order they finished the regular season.

The overall table also provides the secondary path to qualification for the European Rugby Champions Cup, with the four highest-ranked teams not already qualified as Shield winners gaining qualification.

**2021–22 United Rugby Championship Table**
	Team	P	W	D	L	PF	PA	PD	TF	TA	Try bonus	Losing bonus	Pts
1	(Ireland) Leinster	18	13	0	5	546	276	+270	73	31	11	4	67
2	(South Africa) Stormers **(CH)**	18	12	2	4	464	311	+153	60	36	7	2	61
3	(Ireland) Ulster	18	12	0	6	412	297	+115	52	34	7	4	59
4	(South Africa) Bulls **(RU)**	18	11	0	7	518	388	+130	67	42	10	4	58
5	(South Africa) Sharks	18	11	1	6	510	365	+145	60	43	9	2	57
6	(Ireland) Munster	18	11	0	7	524	341	+183	66	34	8	4	56
7	(Scotland) Edinburgh	18	10	1	7	421	318	+103	56	37	8	4	54
8	(Scotland) Glasgow Warriors	18	10	0	8	409	376	+33	53	44	7	3	50
9	(Wales) Ospreys	18	10	0	8	422	474	–52	46	62	4	2	46
10	(Wales) Scarlets	18	8	0	10	494	534	–40	65	73	10	3	45
11	(Ireland) Connacht	18	9	0	9	399	502	–103	51	67	4	1	41
12	(South Africa) Lions	18	8	0	10	408	450	–42	48	55	7	2	41
13	(Italy) Benetton	18	6	1	11	425	501	–76	53	67	6	3	35
14	(Wales) Cardiff	18	7	0	11	369	577	–208	41	72	3	1	32
15	(Wales) Dragons	18	2	1	15	305	547	–242	36	71	3	6	19
16	(Italy) Zebre Parma	18	1	0	17	261	630	–369	32	90	2	3	9
If teams are level at any stage, tiebreakers are applied in the following order: 1. number of matches won; 2. number of matches drawn; 3. the difference between points for and points against; 4. the number of tries scored; 5. the most points scored; 6. the difference between tries for and tries against; 7. the fewest red cards received; 8. the fewest yellow cards received.
Green background indicates teams that are playoff places that top their regional pools and earn a place in the 2022–23 European Champions Cup Blue background indicates teams that did not top their regional pool but are in play-off places and earn a place in the 2022–23 European Champions Cup; Pink background indicates teams that did not top their regional pool or earn a place in the 2022–23 European Champions Cup, but are in play-off places. Yellow background indicates teams that top their regional pool and earn a place in the 2022–23 European Champions Cup, but are not in a play-off place Plain background indicates teams that earn a place in the 2022–23 European Challenge Cup. **(q)** : qualified for the play-offs; **(S)** : winner of the Regional Shield and qualified for the 2022–23 European Rugby Champions Cup; **(e)** : qualified for the 2022–23 European Challenge Cup

== Regular season ==
=== Round 1 ===
24 September 2021
17:35

(1 BP) Zebre Parma (Italy)	26–38	(South Africa) Lions (1 BP)
Try: Canna 52' c Penalty try 57'; Boni 62' c Fabiani 65' m Con: Canna (2) 52', 63'	Report	Try: Ulengo 11' c Odendaal 16' c Maxwane (2) 20' c, 22' c Visagie 33' c Con: Hendrikse (5) 12', 17', 20', 23', 34'; Pen: Hendrikse 43'

Stadio Sergio Lanfranchi
Attendance: 2,000
Referee: Chris Busby

24 September 2021
19:35

(1 BP) Ulster (Ireland)	35–29	(Scotland) Glasgow Warriors (2 BP)
Try: Roberts 23' c Moore 44' c Timoney 49' c Doak 60' c Con: Cooney 24'; Doak (3) 45', 50', 61'	Report	Try: G. Horne 15' m Matthews 40' +3 c Penalty try 55'; Dobie 65' c Con: Thompson (2) 40' +4, 66'; Pen: Weir 27'

Ravenhill Stadium
Attendance: 10,000
Referee: Ben Whitehouse

24 September 2021
19:35

(1 BP) Cardiff (Wales)	33–21	(Ireland) Connacht
Try: Amos 10' c Halaholo 39' c Lane (2) 51' c, 70' m Belcher 74' c Con: Evans 11'; L. Williams (3) 40', 52', 72'	Report	Try: Marmion (2) 13' c, 80' +1 m Con: Carty 14'; Pen: Carty (3) 4', 37', 58'

Cardiff Arms Park
Attendance: 5,292
Referee: Andrea Piardi

25 September 2021
13:00

Benetton (Italy)	22–18	(South Africa) Stormers (1 BP)
Try: Lucchesi 16' c Nemer 59' c Menoncello 71' m Con: Albornoz (2) 17', 60'; Pen: Albornoz 63'	Report	Try: Pretorius 2' m Nel 44' c Con: Libbok 45'; Pen: Libbok (2) 23', 38'

Stadio Comunale di Monigo
Attendance: 2,000
Referee: Frank Murphy

25 September 2021
17:15

(1 BP) Leinster (Ireland)	31–3	(South Africa) Bulls
Try: Van der Flier 7' c Porter 13' c Tracy 57' c R. Byrne 70' c Con: Sexton (3) 9', 15', 59'; R. Byrne 71'; Pen: Sexton 5'	Report	Pen: Goosen 22'

Aviva Stadium
Attendance: 19,419
Referee: Mike Adamson

25 September 2021
17:15

(1 BP) Edinburgh (Scotland)	26–22	(Wales) Scarlets (1 BP)
Try: Kinghorn 25' c Bennett 35' c Graham (2) 39' m, 58' c Con: Kinghorn (3) 26', 35', 59'	Report	Try: R. Evans 12' m Hardy 51' c McNicholl 66' c Con: D. Jones 52'; Costelow 67'; Pen: D. Jones 38'

Edinburgh Rugby Stadium
Attendance: 5,330
Referee: Andrew Brace

25 September 2021
19:35

(1 BP) Munster (Ireland)	42–17	(South Africa) Sharks
Try: Zebo (2) 6' m, 80' m Casey 36' m Coombes (2) 44' c, 51' c Cloete 78' c Con: Carbery (2) 45', 52'; Healy 79'; Pen: Carbery 29'; Healy 69'	Report	Try: Chamberlain 57' c Penxe 71' c Con: Bosch (2) 57', 71'; Pen: Bosch 32'

Thomond Park
Attendance: 11,418 (Note: Reduced stadium capacity due to COVID-19 restrictions.)
Referee: Craig Evans

26 September 2021
14:00

(1 BP) Dragons (Wales)	23–27	(Wales) Ospreys
Try: Lewis 4' c R. Williams 77' c Con: S. Davies (2) 6', 77'; Pen: S. Davies (2) 12', 21'; Drop: S. Davies 27'	Report	Try: Collins (2) 18' c, 52' c L. Morgan 62' c Con: Anscombe (3) 19', 53', 64'; Pen: Anscombe (2) 29', 44'

Rodney Parade
Attendance: 6,398
Referee: Sam Grove-White

=== Round 2 ===
1 October 2021
19:35

(1 BP) Connacht (Ireland)	34–7	(South Africa) Bulls
Try: O'Halloran 16' c Daly (2) 45' c, 80' +1 m Hansen 49' m Farrell 72' c Con: Carty (3) 17', 46', 73'; Pen: Carty 34'	Report	Try: Gqobka 2' c Con: Goosen 3'

Galway Sportsgrounds
Attendance: 3,007
Referee: Ben Blain

1 October 2021
19:35

(1 BP) Scarlets (Wales)	36–13	(South Africa) Lions
Try: R. Evans 5' c Rogers (2) 19' c, 70' m St. Evans 79' m Con: Costelow (2) 6', 20'; Pen: Costelow (4) 29', 39', 63', 67'	Report	Try: Schoeman 60' c Con: Hendrikse 61'; Pen: Hendrikse (2) 14', 33'

Parc y Scarlets
Attendance: 7,824
Referee: Andrea Piardi

2 October 2021
13:00

Benetton (Italy)	28–27	(Scotland) Edinburgh (2 BP)
Try: Lucchesi (2) 5' m, 71' c Ioane 33' c Con: Albornoz 35'; Marin 73'; Pen: Albornoz 22'; Marin 58'; Drop: Marin 80' +5	Report	Try: Nel 17' c Vellacott (2) 25' c, 29' m McInally 50' m Con: Van der Walt (2) 18', 26'; Pen: Van der Walt 75'

Stadio Comunale di Monigo
Referee: Craig Evans

2 October 2021
15:00

(1 BP) Glasgow Warriors (Scotland)	35–24	(South Africa) Sharks
Try: Thompson 2' c Wilson 14' c Bhatti 20' c Forbes (2) 36' c, 43' c Tuipulotu 49' m Con: Thompson (5) 3', 14', 21', 38', 44'	Report	Try: Roets 26' c Du Toit 58' c N. Mchunu 74' c Con: Bosch (2) 26', 59'; Pienaar 75'; Pen: Bosch 40' +1

Scotstoun Stadium
Attendance: 6,449
Referee: Ben Whitehouse

2 October 2021
17:15

Zebre Parma (Italy)	3–36	(Ireland) Ulster (1 BP)
Pen: Rizzi 34'	Report	Try: McIlroy (2) 21' m, 40' m Addison 47' c Hume 57' m Timoney (2) 63' c, 79' c Con: Burns 48'; Doak 64'; Lowry 80'

Stadio Sergio Lanfranchi
Attendance: 1,400
Referee: Sam Grove-White

2 October 2021
19:35

Ospreys (Wales)	18–14	(Wales) Cardiff (1 BP)
Pen: Anscombe (6) 2', 15', 28', 38', 52', 64'	Report	Try: Adams 19' c Lane 45' c Con: Priestland (2) 19', 46'

Liberty Stadium
Attendance: 5,767
Referee: Marius van der Westhuizen

2 October 2021
19:35

(1 BP) Munster (Ireland)	34–18	(South Africa) Stormers
Try: O'Donoghue (2) 40' +1 c, 56' m Kleyn 46' c Scannell 51' m Snyman 68' c Con: Carbery (2) 42', 47'; Healy 69'; Pen: Healy 80' +1	Report	Try: Gelant 9' m Zas 20' c Libbok 25' c Con: Libbok 22'; Pen: Gelant 30'; Swiel 66'

Thomond Park
Attendance: 10,723
Referee: Andrew Brace

3 October 2021
14:00

(1 BP) Dragons (Wales)	6–7	(Ireland) Leinster
Pen: S. Davies (2) 63', 66'	Report	Try: Deegan 14' c Con: R. Byrne 15'

Rodney Parade
Attendance: 5,043
Referee: AJ Jacobs

=== Round 3 ===
8 October 2021
19:35

(1 BP) Ulster (Ireland)	28–8	(Italy) Benetton
Try: Gilroy 23' c Doak (2) 27' c, 78' c Herring 34' c Con: Doak (4) 24', 28', 35', 79'	Report	Try: Ratuva Tavuyara 59' m Pen: Marin 8'

Ravenhill Stadium
Attendance: 10,582
Referee: AJ Jacobs

8 October 2021
19:35

Ospreys (Wales)	13–27	(South Africa) Sharks
Try: Thomas 74' c Con: Myler 75'; Pen: Anscombe (2) 3', 17'	Report	Try: Ward 42' c Potgieter 59' m Con: Pienaar 43'; Pen: Pienaar (2) 68', 78'

Liberty Stadium
Attendance: 5,286
Referee: Frank Murphy

9 October 2021
13:00

(1 BP) Leinster (Ireland)	43–7	(Italy) Zebre Parma
Try: Penny 2' m Larmour 13' m A. Byrne (2) 39' m, 49' c E. Byrne 43' c Cronin 46' c Kelleher 64' c Con: Sexton (4) 44', 47', 50', 65'	Report	Try: Bruno 67' c Con: Pescetto 68'

RDS Arena
Attendance: 10,400
Referee: Sam Grove-White

9 October 2021
15:00

Glasgow Warriors (Scotland)	13–9	(South Africa) Lions (1 BP)
Try: Bhatti 3' c Con: Thompson 3'; Pen: Thompson (2) 16', 72'	Report	Pen: Viljoen (3) 6', 28', 43'

Scotstoun Stadium
Referee: Gianluca Gnecchi

9 October 2021
17:15

Connacht (Ireland)	22–35	(Wales) Dragons (1 BP)
Try: Hansen 58' m Fitzgerald 72' m Pen: Carty (4) 3', 14', 31', 34'	Report	Try: Holmes (2) 27' m, 65' c J. Williams 47' c Doge 52' c Con: S. Davies (3) 48', 53', 66'; Pen: S. Davies (3) 18', 62', 75'

Galway Sportsgrounds
Attendance: 3,109
Referee: Marius van der Westhuizen

9 October 2021
17:15

Edinburgh (Scotland)	20–20	(South Africa) Stormers
Try: Graham 3' c Vellacott 6' c Con: Van der Walt (2) 4', 8'; Pen: Van der Walt (2) 28', 36'	Report	Try: Gelant 9' c De Wet 33' c Con: Swiel (2) 10', 34'; Pen: Swiel (2) 13', 39'

Edinburgh Rugby Stadium
Attendance: 5,895
Referee: Andrea Piardi

9 October 2021
19:35

Cardiff (Wales)	19–29	(South Africa) Bulls
Try: Screech 18' c Con: Priestland 19'; Pen: Priestland (4) 5', 11', 34', 73'	Report	Try: Louw 43' c Tambwe 61' c Con: Smith (2) 44', 61'; Pen: Smith (5) 26', 49', 64', 72', 77'

Cardiff Arms Park
Attendance: 7,725
Referee: Chris Busby

10 October 2021
14:00

Scarlets (Wales)	13–43	(Ireland) Munster (1 BP)
Try: McNicholl 29'; Con: Costelow 30'; Pen: Costelow (2) 17', 34'	Report	Try: O'Sullivan 4' c Coombes (2) 23' c, 59' c Nash 36' m Loughman 44' c Cloete 62' c Con: Healy (5) 5', 25', 45', 60', 64'; Pen: Healy 11'

Parc y Scarlets
Attendance: 6,336
Referee: Ben Blain

=== Round 4 ===
15 October 2021
19:35

(1 BP) Ulster (Ireland)	26–10	(South Africa) Lions
Try: Timoney (2) 4' m, 67' c Hume 35' c Mat. Rea 48' c Con: Doak (3) 36', 49', 68'	Report	Try: Pienaar 17' c Con: Viljoen 18'; Pen: Viljoen 40'

Ravenhill Stadium
Attendance: 11,412
Referee: Mike Adamson

15 October 2021
19:35

Dragons (Wales)	10–24	(South Africa) Stormers
Try: Lewis 22' c Con: S. Davies 23'; Pen: S. Davies 28'	Report	Try: Zas (2) 64' m, 79' c Con: Libbok 80' +1; Pen: Libbok (4) 16', 38', 42', 74'

Rodney Parade
Attendance: 5,678
Referee: Gianluca Gnecchi

16 October 2021
13:00

Zebre Parma (Italy)	6–17	(Scotland) Glasgow Warriors
Pen: Canna (2) 21', 33'	Report	Try: Bean 5' c Tuipulotu 29' c Con: Weir (2) 6', 30'; Pen: Weir 66'

Stadio Sergio Lanfranchi
Attendance: 1,300
Referee: Andrew Brace

16 October 2021
15:00

(2 BP) Benetton (Italy)	26–29	(Wales) Ospreys (1 BP)
Try: Lucchesi 6' c Smith 52' c Ioane 60' m Menoncello 68' c Con: Albornoz 7'; Coetzee (2) 53', 68'	Report	Try: Nagy 33' m Roots 36' c Webb (2) 43' c, 48' c Con: Myler (3) 38', 44', 49'; Pen: Myler 77'

Stadio Comunale di Monigo
Attendance: 2,158
Referee: Aimee Barrett-Theron

16 October 2021
17:15

(1 BP) Leinster (Ireland)	50–15	(Wales) Scarlets
Try: Kelleher 24' m Porter 29' c Doris 46' c Healy 61' c Sheehan (2) 70' c, 77' c Con: Sexton 31'; Frawley 46'; R. Byrne (3) 62', 70', 78'; Pen: Sexton 8'	Report	Try: McNicholl 18' m Lezana 49' c Con: D. Jones 50'; Pen: Costelow 2'

RDS Arena
Attendance: 14,005
Referee: Marius van der Westhuizen

16 October 2021
17:15

Edinburgh (Scotland)	17–10	(South Africa) Bulls (1 BP)
Try: Immelman 8' m Pen: Van der Walt (3) 29', 33', 36'; Bennett 74'	Report	Try: Coetzee 70' c Con: Steyn 71'; Pen: Smith 21'

Edinburgh Rugby Stadium
Attendance: 6,002
Referee: Ben Whitehouse

16 October 2021
19:35

Munster (Ireland)	20–18	(Ireland) Connacht (1 BP)
Try: Cloete 39' c Barron 78' c Con: Carbery (2) 40', 80'; Pen: Carbery (2) 49', 59'	Report	Try: Boyle 53' m Carty 69' c Con: Carty 70'; Pen: Carty (2) 3', 10'

Thomond Park
Attendance: 17,198
Referee: Chris Busby

16 October 2021
19:35

Cardiff (Wales)	23–17	(South Africa) Sharks (1 BP)
Try: Morgan 10' c Halaholo 27' c Con: Priestland (2) 11', 28'; Pen: Priestland (3) 7', 68', 77'	Report	Try: Du Toit 31' c Potgieter 71' c Con: Bosch 32'; Chamberlain 72'; Pen: Chamberlain 42'

Cardiff Arms Park
Attendance: 8,161
Referee: Gareth Newman

=== Round 5 ===
22 October 2021
19:35

(1 BP) Scarlets (Wales)	34–28	(Italy) Benetton (2 BP)
Try: R. Evans 17' c Blacker (2) 19' c, 65' c Ma. Jones 55' c Con: D. Jones (3) 18', 20', 56'; O'Brien 65'; Pen: D. Jones 50'; O'Brien 71'	Report	Try: Duvenage 29' c Gallo (2) 44' c, 58' c Menoncello 73' c Con: Smith (4) 30', 43', 59', 72'

Parc y Scarlets
Attendance: 6,074
Referee: Chris Busby

22 October 2021
19:35

Glasgow Warriors (Scotland)	15–31	(Ireland) Leinster (1 BP)
Try: Dempsey 39' c Bean 80' m Con: Thompson 40'; Pen: Thompson 52'	Report	Try: Kelleher 7' c Keenan 28' c A. Byrne 52' c Sheehan 61' c Con: R. Byrne (4) 9', 29', 54', 62'; Pen: R. Byrne 5'

Scotstoun Stadium
Attendance: 7,246
Referee: Craig Evans

23 October 2021
13:00

Zebre Parma (Italy)	10–27	(Scotland) Edinburgh (1 BP)
Try: Bruno 16' c Con: Canna 17'; Pen: Rizzi 64'	Report	Try: Blain 33' m McInally 53' m Venter 60' c Vellacott 80' +2 c Con: Kinghorn (2) 60', 80' +3; Pen: Kinghorn 5'

Stadio Sergio Lanfranchi
Attendance: 1,500
Referee: Frank Murphy

23 October 2021
17:15

(1 BP) Connacht (Ireland)	36–11	(Ireland) Ulster
Try: Murray 11' c Hansen (2) 25' c, 80' +2 c Porch 62' m Kilgallen 65' c Con: Carty (4) 13', 25', 66', 80' +3; Pen: Carty 28'	Report	Try: Roberts 68' m Pen: Doak (2) 5', 17'

Aviva Stadium
Attendance: 9,875
Referee: Andrew Brace

23 October 2021
17:15

Cardiff (Wales)	31–29	(Wales) Dragons (2 BP)
Try: L. Williams 22' c Amos 38' m Penalty try 50'; Con: Evans 23'; Pen: Evans (4) 7', 27', 56', 59'	Report	Try: T. Davies 3' c Doge 18' c Dyer 61' m Maksymiw 80' +1 c Con: S. Davies (3) 3', 18', 80' +2; Pen: S. Davies 54'

Cardiff Arms Park
Attendance: 8,194
Referee: Ben Whitehouse

23 October 2021
19:35

Ospreys (Wales)	18–10	(Ireland) Munster
Pen: Myler (6) 2', 32', 36', 46', 64', 72'	Report	Try: Casey 54' c Con: Crowley 55'; Pen: Crowley 6'

Liberty Stadium
Attendance: 5,678
Referee: Hollie Davidson

3 December 2021
19:00

Sharks (South Africa)	30–16	(South Africa) Bulls
Try: Am 53' c Van Vuuren 71' m Con: Chamberlain 54'; Pen: Chamberlain (6) 20', 33', 42', 52', 59', 67'	Report	Try: D. Kriel 23' c Con: Steyn 24'; Pen: Steyn (3) 30', 37', 57'

Kings Park Stadium
Referee: Jaco Peyper

4 December 2021
17:00

Stormers (South Africa)	19–37	(South Africa) Lions (1 BP)
Try: Ungerer 27' c Senatla 31' m Venter 77' c Con: Libbok 28'; Swiel 78'	Report	Try: Horn (2) 11' c, 79' c Warner 45' c V. Tshituka 56' c Con: Zeilinga (4) 11', 45', 56', 80'; Pen: Zeilinga (3) 15', 39', 69'

Cape Town Stadium
Referee: Marius van der Westhuizen

=== Round 6 ===
26 November 2021
19:35

(1 BP) Connacht (Ireland)	46–18	(Wales) Ospreys
Try: Hansen 3' m Bolton 14' m McNulty 23' m Arnold 43' c Blade 70' c Fitzgerald 78' c Con: Carty (3) 44', 71', 79'; Pen: Carty 13'	Report	Try: Morgan 17' m Hawkins 50' c Con: Myler 51'; Pen: Myler (2) 10', 36'

Galway Sportsgrounds
Attendance: 5,025
Referee: Ben Blain

27 November 2021
13:00

Benetton (Italy)	19–18	(Scotland) Glasgow Warriors (1 BP)
Try: Smith 1' m Pettinelli 21' m Pen: Marin (3) 32', 63', 80+3'	Report	Try: Dempsey 7' m Darge 34' c Con: Thompson 35'; Pen: Thompson (2) 19', 45'

Stadio Comunale di Monigo
Referee: Marius van der Westhuizen

27 November 2021
17:15

Dragons (Wales)	14–30	(Scotland) Edinburgh (1 BP)
Try: S. Davies 23' c Holmes 33' c Con: S. Davies (2) 24', 34'	Report	Try: Boffelli 3' c Moyano (2) 19' m, 37' m Hoyland 80+1' c Con: Kinghorn (2) 4', 80+2'; Pen: Kinghorn (2) 57', 69'

Rodney Parade
Attendance: 5,552
Referee: Mike Adamson

27 November 2021
20:00

Leinster (Ireland)	10–20	(Ireland) Ulster
Try: Henshaw 51' c Con: R. Byrne 51'; Pen: R. Byrne 65'	Report	Try: Jones 16' c Hume 79' c Con: Cooney 17'; Doak 80'; Pen: Cooney 48'; Doak 68'

RDS Arena
Attendance: 14,625
Referee: Frank Murphy

11 March 2022
17:10

(1 BP) Sharks (South Africa)	37–20	(Wales) Scarlets
Try: Fassi 56' c Bosch 62' c Penalty try 72'; Louw 80+7' c Con: Bosch (2) 56', 63'; Díaz Bonilla 80+8'; Pen: Bosch (3) 19', 39', 70'	Report	Try: Shingler 47' c St. Evans 75' c Con: Costelow 48'; D. Jones 75'; Pen: Costelow (2) 9', 16'

Kings Park Stadium
Attendance: 6,456
Referee: Sam Grove-White

12 March 2022
14:05

Bulls (South Africa)	29–24	(Ireland) Munster (1 BP)
Try: Tambwe 17' c W. Steenkamp 33' c Con: Smith (2) 17', 34'; Pen: Smith (5) 3', 9', 22', 30', 47'	Report	Try: Kendellen 54' c De Allende 65' c O'Donoghue 73' c Con: Healy (3) 55', 66', 75'; Pen: Healy 6'

Loftus Versfeld Stadium
Attendance: 2,000
Referee: Ben Whitehouse

13 March 2022
14:00

(1 BP) Lions (South Africa)	37–20	(Wales) Cardiff
Try: Van den Berg 2' c Van der Merwe (2) 14' c, 22' c V. Tshituka 80+1' c Con: Hendrikse (4) 3', 15', 23', 80+2'; Pen: Hendrikse (3) 9', 48', 58'	Report	Try: Summerhill 31' c Botham 44' c Con: Evans (2) 32', 45'; Pen: Evans (2) 6', 12'

Ellis Park Stadium
Attendance: 2,000
Referee: Chris Busby

13 March 2022
16:05

(1 BP) Stormers (South Africa)	55–7	(Italy) Zebre Parma
Try: Libbok 2' c Willemse 8' c Zas (2) 12' c, 60' m Senatla (3) 24' c, 57' m, 79' c Ntubeni (2) 39' m, 75' m Con: Libbok (4) 3', 9', 13', 25'; Swiel 80'	Report	Try: Cronjé 43' c Con: Canna 44'

Danie Craven Stadium
Attendance: 2,000
Referee: Adam Jones

=== Round 7 ===
3 December 2021
19:35

(1 BP) Edinburgh (Scotland)	24–10	(Italy) Benetton
Try: Graham 14' m Boffelli 22' m Kinghorn 46' c McInally 68' c Con: Kinghorn (2) 47', 70'	Report	Try: Zuliani 60' c Con: Marin 61'; Pen: Marin 9'

Edinburgh Rugby Stadium
Attendance: 5,438
Referee: Adam Jones

3 December 2021
19:45

(1 BP) Leinster (Ireland)	47–19	(Ireland) Connacht
Try: Ruddock 23' c Ringrose 33' c Sheehan 40' m Larmour 42' c Doris 50' c Baird 59' c Deegan 75' c Con: R. Byrne (6) 24', 34', 43', 50', 59', 76'	Report	Try: Hansen 14' m Arnold 29' c Oliver 62' c Con: Carty (2) 30', 63'

RDS Arena
Attendance: 14,127
Referee: Chris Busby

4 December 2021
15:00

Ospreys (Wales)	19–13	(Ireland) Ulster (1 BP)
Try: Morris 32' c Con: Myler 34'; Pen: Myler (4) 18', 36', 60', 66'	Report	Try: Penalty try 15'; Pen: Cooney (2) 20', 53'

Liberty Stadium
Attendance: 5,695
Referee: Sam Grove-White

4 December 2021
17:15

(1 BP) Glasgow Warriors (Scotland)	33–14	(Wales) Dragons
Try: Tuipulotu 16' c Steyn 26' m Dempsey 40' c Price 59' c Matthews 71' c Con: Thompson (4) 17', 40+1', 61', 72'	Report	Try: Shipp 66' c Doge 76' c Con: S. Davies (2) 66', 77'

Scotstoun Stadium
Attendance: 6,543
Referee: Frank Murphy

18 March 2022
17:10

(1 BP) Bulls (South Africa)	57–12	(Wales) Scarlets
Try: Moodie 2' c Coetzee (2) 8' m, 72' m Brink 14' m Grobbelaar (2) 25' c, 52' c Louw 30' c Nortjé 44' c Ludwig 78' c Con: Smith (5) 3', 25', 31', 46', 53'; Steyn 79'	Report	Try: Kalamafoni 32' c R. Evans 80+1' m Con: Patchell 34'

Loftus Versfeld Stadium
Attendance: 5,346
Referee: Chris Busby

19 March 2022
12:00

Lions (South Africa)	23–21	(Ireland) Munster (1 BP)
Try: Van der Merwe 32' c Simelane 67' c Con: Hendrikse (2) 33', 68'; Pen: Hendrikse (3) 36', 66', 74'	Report	Try: Ryan 8' c J. Wycherley 14' c F. Wycherley 40+2' c Con: Crowley (3) 9', 15', 40+3'

Ellis Park Stadium
Attendance: 2,000
Referee: Adam Jones

19 March 2022
16:30

(1 BP) Sharks (South Africa)	38–6	(Italy) Zebre Parma
Try: H. Venter 8' c Mbonambi 43' c K. Mchunu 58' c Williams 61' c Bosch 70' c Con: Bosch (5) 9', 45', 59', 62', 71'; Pen: Bosch 27'	Report	Pen: Rizzi (2) 31', 42'

Kings Park Stadium
Attendance: 2,000
Referee: Ben Whitehouse

20 March 2022
12:00

(1 BP) Stormers (South Africa)	40–3	(Wales) Cardiff
Try: Nel 17' c Zas 33' m Libbok 39' c Pokomela 61' c Roos 64' c Pretorius 68' c Con: Libbok (4) 18', 40+1', 62', 65'; Swiel 69'	Report	Pen: Evans 8'

Cape Town Stadium
Attendance: 2,000
Referee: Sam Grove-White

=== Round 8 ===
24 December 2021
17:00

Zebre Parma (Italy)	14–39	(Italy) Benetton (1 BP)
Try: Boni 64' c Bisegni 67' c Con: Canna 64'; O'Malley 67'	Report	Try: Ruzza 17' c Pettinelli 32' c Menoncello 35' c Brex 55' c Marin 72' m Con: Smith (4) 18', 33', 35', 57'; Pen: Smith (2) 5', 53'

Stadio Sergio Lanfranchi
Attendance: 1,500
Referee: Andrea Piardi

22 January 2022
13:00

(1 BP) Lions (South Africa)	37–47	(South Africa) Sharks (1 BP)
Try: Warner 7' c Simelane 10' m Schoeman 51' c Van der Merwe 60' m Van den Berg 69' c Con: Zeilinga (2) 8', 52'; Swanepoel 71'; Pen: Zeilinga (2) 25', 29'	Report	Try: Fassi 15' c Mapimpi (3) 19' m, 39' c, 54' c Van Vuuren 32' m Am 80' c Con: Chamberlain (3) 17', 40', 55'; Díaz Bonilla 80+1'; Pen: Chamberlain (2) 7', 44'; Díaz Bonilla 57'

Ellis Park Stadium
Attendance: 2,000
Referee: Rasta Rasivhenge

22 January 2022
15:05

(2 BP) Bulls (South Africa)	26–30	(South Africa) Stormers (1 BP)
Try: Grobbelaar 43' c Tambwe (2) 52' c, 56' c Louw 63' m Con: Smith 45'; Steyn (2) 53', 56'	Report	Try: Senatla (2) 7' m, 30' c Jantjies 66' m De Wet 77' c Con: Libbok (2) 32', 78'; Pen: Libbok (2) 12', 27'

Loftus Versfeld Stadium
Attendance: 2,000
Referee: Jaco Peyper

4 February 2022
20:15

(1 BP) Ulster (Ireland)	32–12	(Ireland) Connacht
Try: Jones 14' c D. Moore 21' c Baloucoune (2) 42' c, 80+4' m Con: Doak (3) 16', 22', 43'; Pen: Doak (2) 54', 75'	Report	Try: McNulty 25' m Wootton 47' c Con: Fitzgerald 48'

Ravenhill Stadium
Attendance: 12,470
Referee: Andrew Brace

11 February 2022
18:00

(1 BP) Leinster (Ireland)	26–7	(Scotland) Edinburgh
Try: Penny 20' c N. McCarthy 32' c Abdaladze 67' m Deegan 71' c Con: R. Byrne (3) 21', 33', 73'	Report	Try: Boffelli 76' c Con: Boffelli 76'

RDS Arena
Attendance: 8,559
Referee: Adam Jones

11 February 2022
20:15

Glasgow Warriors (Scotland)	13–11	(Ireland) Munster (1 BP)
Try: Cummings 39' c Con: Weir 40+1'; Pen: Weir (2) 16', 61'	Report	Try: Kleyn 72' m Pen: Healy (2) 38', 64'

Scotstoun Stadium
Attendance: 6,238
Referee: Gianluca Gnecchi

9 April 2022
14:10

Cardiff (Wales)	14–49	(Wales) Scarlets (1 BP)
Try: Cabango 4' c L. Williams 12' c Con: Evans (2) 5', 13'	Report	Try: Shingler 41' c L. Williams (2) 43' c, 73' c Davis 59' c Rogers 76' c J. Davies 78' c Con: Costelow (4) 43', 45', 60', 73'; O'Brien (2) 77', 79'

Cardiff Arms Park
Attendance: 9,232
Referee: Adam Jones

8 May 2022
15:00

(1 BP) Ospreys (Wales)	50–31	(Wales) Dragons (1 BP)
Try: Smith 18' m Morris (3) 27' c, 38' c, 54' c Morgan-Williams (2) 32' c, 67' c Parry 70' c Con: Anscombe (6) 29', 33', 39', 54', 68', 71'; Pen: Anscombe 2'	Report	Try: Rosser 6' c Warren 9' c Doge 23' c L. Jones 80' c Con: Reed (3) 7', 10', 25'; S. Davies 80'; Pen: Reed 21'

Liberty Stadium
Attendance: 7,190
Referee: Adam Jones

=== Round 9 ===
1 January 2022
17:15

Connacht (Ireland)	10–8	(Ireland) Munster (1 BP)
Try: Aki 58' c Con: Fitzgerald 59'; Pen: Carty 15'	Report	Try: Conway 23' m Pen: Healy 18'

Galway Sportsgrounds
Attendance: 3,064
Referee: Chris Busby

1 January 2022
17:15

(1 BP) Scarlets (Wales)	22–19	(Wales) Ospreys (1 BP)
Try: G. Davies 10' c St. Evans 53' m McNicholl (2) 66' m, 78' m Con: D. Jones 11'	Report	Try: Webb (2) 21' c, 57' c L. Morgan 30' m Con: J. Thomas (2) 22', 58'

Parc y Scarlets
Attendance: Behind closed doors
Referee: Adam Jones

5 February 2022
13:00

Bulls (South Africa)	21–13	(South Africa) Lions
Try: Coetzee 25' c Grobbelaar 39' c Arendse 49' c Con: Steyn (3) 26', 40', 50'	Report	Try: Schoeman 72' c Con: Swanepoel 73'; Pen: Swanepoel (2) 3', 8'

Loftus Versfeld Stadium
Attendance: 2,000
Referee: Aimee Barrett-Theron

5 February 2022
15:05

Stormers (South Africa)	20–10	(South Africa) Sharks
Try: Senatla 37' c Smith 52' c Con: Libbok (2) 38', 54'; Pen: Libbok (2) 49', 70'	Report	Try: Williams 63' c Con: Chamberlain 64'; Pen: Díaz Bonilla 20'

Cape Town Stadium
Attendance: 2,000
Referee: AJ Jacobs

12 March 2022
19:35

Ulster (Ireland)	18–13	(Ireland) Leinster (1 BP)
Try: Carter 9' c Lowry 35' m Con: Doak 10'; Pen: Doak (2) 32' 42'	Report	Try: Deegan 29' c Con: R. Byrne 29'; Pen: R. Byrne (2) 13' 42'

Ravenhill Stadium
Attendance: 16,274
Referee: Frank Murphy

18 March 2022
19:35

Glasgow Warriors (Scotland)	30–17	(Scotland) Edinburgh
Try: Gordon (2) 9' c, 30' c McKay 55' c Con: Weir (2) 10', 30'; Thompson 57'; Pen: Weir 40'; Thompson (2) 65', 72'	Report	Try: Young 14' c Venter 48' c Con: Boffelli (2) 15', 49'; Pen: Boffelli 35'

Scotstoun Stadium
Attendance: 7,351
Referee: Hollie Davidson

13 May 2022
19:35

(1 BP) Dragons (Wales)	18–19	(Wales) Cardiff
Try: Griffiths 40' c Dixon 64' m Con: S. Davies 40+1'; Pen: Reed (2) 25', 75'	Report	Try: L. Williams 32' c Con: Priestland 33'; Pen: Priestland (4) 2', 46', 69', 73'

Rodney Parade
Attendance: 6,414
Referee: Craig Evans

14 May 2022
16:30

(1 BP) Benetton (Italy)	39–17	(Italy) Zebre Parma
Try: Smith (3) 1' c, 42' c, 56' c Padovani 17' c Bellini 79' m Con: Smith (4) 3', 17', 44', 57'; Pen: Smith (2) 49', 73'	Report	Try: Trulla (2) 20' c, 60' c Con: Canna (2) 21', 61'; Pen: Canna 35'

Stadio Comunale di Monigo
Referee: Gianluca Gnecchi

=== Round 10 ===
8 January 2022
15:00

(1 BP) Edinburgh (Scotland)	34–10	(Wales) Cardiff
Try: Moyano 5' c Boffelli 9' m Bennett (2) 31' c, 74' c Lang 40' m Con: Boffelli (2) 6', 32'; Van der Walt 75'; Pen: Boffelli 18'	Report	Try: Lane 62' c Con: Evans 62'; Pen: Priestland 26'

Edinburgh Rugby Stadium
Attendance: Behind closed doors
Referee: Frank Murphy

8 January 2022
17:15

(1 BP) Glasgow Warriors (Scotland)	38–19	(Wales) Ospreys
Try: Forbes 22' c Tuipulotu (2) 27' c, 62' c McKay 48' c Brown 73' c Con: Thompson (4) 24', 29', 50', 63'; Weir 74'; Pen: Thompson 8'	Report	Try: D. Evans 71' c Con: Anscombe 71'; Pen: Anscombe (4) 3', 11', 26', 31'

Scotstoun Stadium
Attendance: Behind closed doors
Referee: Chris Busby

8 January 2022
19:35

Munster (Ireland)	18–13	(Ireland) Ulster (1 BP)
Try: Haley 61' m Kendellen 76' c Con: Healy 77'; Pen: Crowley (2) 33', 40+1'	Report	Try: Herring 8' c Con: Cooney 10'; Pen: Doak (2) 43', 57'

Thomond Park
Attendance: 5,000
Referee: Mike Adamson

25 February 2022
17:30

Zebre Parma (Italy)	7–45	(South Africa) Bulls (1 BP)
Try: Rizzi 24' c Con: Rizzi 25'	Report	Try: Grobbelaar 32' c Papier 35' c Coetzee 53' c Botha 58' c Mapoe 63' c Arendse 68' c Con: Smith (6) 33', 36', 53', 59', 63', 70'; Pen: Smith 31'

Stadio Sergio Lanfranchi
Attendance: 1,200
Referee: Adam Jones

25 February 2022
19:35

Leinster (Ireland)	21–13	(South Africa) Lions
Try: Kearney 7' c Alaalatoa 48' c Penny 51' c Con: R. Byrne (3) 9', 48', 52'	Report	Try: Kriel 79' c Con: Swanepoel 79'; Pen: Hendrikse (2) 13', 37'

RDS Arena
Attendance: 10,469
Referee: Craig Evans

26 February 2022
13:00

Connacht (Ireland)	19–17	(South Africa) Stormers (1 BP)
Try: Boyle 30' c Daly 60' c Sullivan 72' m Con: Fitzgerald (2) 31', 61'	Report	Try: Petersen 19' m Willemse 39' m Libbok 48' c Con: Libbok 49'

Galway Sportsgrounds
Attendance: 3,404
Referee: Ben Blain

26 February 2022
15:05

Benetton (Italy)	7–29	(South Africa) Sharks (1 BP)
Try: Wegner 64' c Con: Albornoz 64'	Report	Try: R. van Heerden 7' c Fassi 26' c Buthelezi 42' c Nkosi 79' m Con: Bosch (3) 8', 27', 44'; Pen: Bosch 74'

Stadio Comunale di Monigo
Referee: Andrew Brace

16 April 2022
19:35

(1 BP) Scarlets (Wales)	27–38	(Wales) Dragons (1 BP)
Try: Kalamafoni 26' c L. Williams 42' m J. Williams 54' c Hardy 60' m Con: Costelow 27'; O'Brien 55'; Pen: Costelow 17'	Report	Try: Dixon 12' c Basham 32' c J. Rosser 43' c T. Davies 73' c R. Williams 75' c Con: S. Davies (5) 12', 33', 44', 73', 76'; Pen: S. Davies 80'

Parc y Scarlets
Attendance: 7,803
Referee: Ben Whitehouse

=== Round 11 ===
28 January 2022
19:35

Dragons (Wales)	13–13	(Italy) Benetton
Try: Moriarty 44' c Con: S. Davies 45'; Pen: S. Davies (2) 42', 62'	Report	Try: Els 23' c Con: Albornoz 24'; Pen: Albornoz (2) 13', 47'

Rodney Parade
Attendance: 3,571
Referee: Andrew Brace

28 January 2022
19:35

(1 BP) Ulster (Ireland)	27–15	(Wales) Scarlets
Try: Curtis 35' c Carter 53' m Milasinovich 66' c Gilroy 68' m Con: Doak (2) 36', 67'; Pen: Doak 4'	Report	Try: Lee 29' c Mathias 62' m Con: D. Jones 30'; Pen: D. Jones 10'

Ravenhill Stadium
Attendance: 9,542
Referee: Jaco Peyper

29 January 2022
13:00

Lions (South Africa)	10–34	(South Africa) Bulls (1 BP)
Try: Kriel 57' c Con: Swanepoel 58'; Pen: Zeilinga 7'	Report	Try: Grobbelaar 17' c Papier 32' c Botha 53' c Vorster 75' c Con: Steyn (4) 18', 33', 54', 76'; Pen: Steyn (2) 2', 12'

Ellis Park Stadium
Attendance: 2,000
Referee: Rasta Rasivhenge

29 January 2022
14:55

Connacht (Ireland)	20–42	(Scotland) Glasgow Warriors (1 BP)
Try: Arnold 13' c Boyle 43' c Con: Forde (2) 14', 44'; Pen: Forde (2) 42', 51'	Report	Try: McLean (2) 3' m, 60' m Steyn (2) 19' c, 63' c Brown 36' m Matthews 80+1' c Con: Weir (3) 21', 64', 80+2'; Pen: Weir (2) 46', 74'

Galway Sportsgrounds
Attendance: 4,527
Referee: Nic Berry

29 January 2022
15:05

Sharks (South Africa)	22–22	(South Africa) Stormers
Try: Am 4' m Mapimpi 46' m Pen: Chamberlain (3) 26', 51', 65'; Drop: Chamberlain 40'	Report	Try: Willemse 53' m Penalty try (2) 69', 80+2'; Pen: Libbok 22'

Kings Park Stadium
Attendance: 2,000
Referee: Marius van der Westhuizen

29 January 2022
17:00

Zebre Parma (Italy)	17–34	(Ireland) Munster (1 BP)
Try: Cronjé 40' c Laloifi 80+1' c Con: O'Malley 40+1'; Rizzi 80+2'; Pen: O'Malley 45'	Report	Try: O'Donoghue 22' m Goggin 29' c F. Wycherley 37' c J. Wycherley 67' c Barron 72' m Con: Flannery (3) 30', 38', 67'; Pen: Crowley 19'

Stadio Sergio Lanfranchi
Attendance: 1,000
Referee: Craig Evans

29 January 2022
17:15

Ospreys (Wales)	23–19	(Scotland) Edinburgh (1 BP)
Try: Protheroe 44' c Parry 55' c Con: Myler (2) 45', 57'; Pen: Myler (3) 30', 69', 75'	Report	Try: Venter (3) 22' c, 26' c, 60' m Con: Van der Walt (2) 23', 27'

Liberty Stadium
Attendance: 4,558
Referee: Andrea Piardi

29 January 2022
19:35

Cardiff (Wales)	29–27	(Ireland) Leinster (1 BP)
Try: Lane 21' c Amos 71' c Con: Evans (2) 23', 72'; Pen: Evans (4) 20', 43', 49', 80+3'; Thomas 30'	Report	Try: A. Byrne 24' c Tracy 53' c Penny 60' c Con: R. Byrne (3) 25', 54', 61'; Pen: R. Byrne (2) 3', 75'

Cardiff Arms Park
Attendance: 6,846
Referee: Mike Adamson

=== Round 12 ===
12 February 2022
13:00

Lions (South Africa)	10–32	(South Africa) Stormers (1 BP)
Try: Van den Berg 78' c Con: Hendrikse 78'; Pen: Swanepoel 21'	Report	Try: Dayimani 28' c Senatla 46' m Petersen 52' c Fourie 73' c Con: Libbok (3) 29', 54', 75'; Pen: Libbok (2) 11', 43'

Ellis Park Stadium
Attendance: 2,000
Referee: Marius van der Westhuizen

12 February 2022
15:05

(2 BP) Bulls (South Africa)	22–29	(South Africa) Sharks (1 BP)
Try: Hendricks 39' m Coetzee 44' c Matanzima 75' m Tambwe 78' m Con: Smith 45'	Report	Try: H. Venter 13' c Mbonambi 28' c Am 40+1' m Mapimpi 58' c Con: Díaz Bonilla (2) 14', 30'; Bosch 60'; Pen: Bosch 80+1'

Loftus Versfeld Stadium
Attendance: 2,000
Referee: AJ Jacobs

18 February 2022
19:35

(1 BP) Munster (Ireland)	34–20	(Scotland) Edinburgh
Try: F. Wycherley 10' c Zebo (3) 40+1' c, 57' c, 76' c Con: Healy (4) 11', 40+3', 58', 78'; Pen: Healy (2) 5', 17'	Report	Try: Moyano 23' c Pyrgos 69' c Con: Boffelli (2) 24', 70'; Pen: Boffelli (2) 38', 49'

Thomond Park
Attendance: 11,791
Referee: Ben Whitehouse

19 February 2022
17:00

(1 BP) Leinster (Ireland)	29–7	(Wales) Ospreys
Try: Larmour 21' m Healy 29' c Lowe 57' c Penny 74' c Con: R. Byrne (3) 30', 59', 75'; Pen: R. Byrne 4'	Report	Try: Webb 61' c Con: Anscombe 62'

RDS Arena
Attendance: 11,586
Referee: Andrew Brace

19 February 2022
19:35

(1 BP) Scarlets (Wales)	23–29	(Ireland) Connacht
Try: J. Williams 19' c Penalty try 63'; Con: D. Jones 20'; Pen: D. Jones (2) 5', 36'; Patchell 76'	Report	Try: Arnold 23' m Fifita 41' c Porch 53' m Con: Carty 42'; Pen: Carty (4) 27', 34', 44', 50'

Parc y Scarlets
Attendance: 5,566
Referee: Craig Evans

19 February 2022
19:35

Glasgow Warriors (Scotland)	13–3	(Italy) Benetton
Try: Smith 21' m Dempsey 58' m Pen: Miotti 4'	Report	Pen: Albornoz 7'

Scotstoun Stadium
Referee: Frank Murphy

20 February 2022
14:00

Dragons (Wales)	0–12	(Ireland) Ulster
	Report	Try: Mar. Rea 40' m Andrew 47' c Con: Doak 48'

Rodney Parade
Attendance: 3,892
Referee: Andrea Piardi

6 May 2022
19:35

(1 BP) Cardiff (Wales)	42–14	(Italy) Zebre Parma
Try: Ratti 5' c L. Williams 11' c Penalty try 18'; Lane (2) 21' c, 37' c Llewellyn 80' c Con: Priestland (4) 6', 11', 22', 39'; Thomas 80+1'	Report	Try: Cronjé 46' c Mbanda 70' c Con: O'Malley 47'; Canna 71'

Cardiff Arms Park
Attendance: 6,383
Referee: Ben Blain

=== Round 13 ===
4 March 2022
19:35

(1 BP) Ulster (Ireland)	48–12	(Wales) Cardiff
Try: Baloucoune (2) 8' c, 53' c Hume 16' c McCloskey 40+1' m Timoney 49' c Sexton 63' m Stewart 69' c Con: Doak (3) 9' 16' 50'; Cooney (2) 56' 71'; Pen: Doak 12'	Report	Try: K. Myhill 45' m Ratti 76' c Con: Thomas 77'

Ravenhill Stadium
Attendance: 11,559
Referee: Hollie Davidson

4 March 2022
19:35

(1 BP) Edinburgh (Scotland)	56–8	(Ireland) Connacht
Try: Boffelli 29' c Immelman (2) 33' c, 60' c Cherry 38' c Kinghorn 42' c Moyano 51' c Young 68' c Vellacott 74' c Con: Boffelli (8) 30', 34', 40', 43', 51', 61', 69', 76'	Report	Try: Sullivan 23' m Pen: Carty 11'

Edinburgh Rugby Stadium
Attendance: 6,116
Referee: Craig Evans

5 March 2022
12:55

Benetton (Italy)	17–61	(Ireland) Leinster (1 BP)
Try: Piantella 51' c L. Cannone 77' c Con: Smith (2) 52', 77'; Pen: Smith 12'	Report	Try: Deegan 6' c Cronin (2) 23' c, 48' c Larmour 29' c R. Byrne 36' c Tracy (2) 55' c, 72' m J. O'Brien (2) 65' c, 80+1' c Con: R. Byrne (7) 7', 24', 29', 37', 49', 56', 64'; J. O'Brien 80+2'

Stadio Comunale di Monigo
Attendance: 1,932
Referee: Ben Whitehouse

5 March 2022
17:15

(1 BP) Munster (Ireland)	64–3	(Wales) Dragons
Try: Casey (2) 10' c, 23' c O'Donoghue (2) 25' c, 75' c Cloete (2) 37' c, 64' m Zebo 53' m Farrell 55' c S. Daly 58' m Hodnett 73' c Con: Crowley (5) 12', 24', 26', 38', 56'; Healy (2) 74', 76'	Report	Pen: S. Davies 17'

Thomond Park
Attendance: 11,853
Referee: Sam Grove-White

5 March 2022
17:15

(1 BP) Scarlets (Wales)	35–10	(Scotland) Glasgow Warriors
Try: St. Evans 39' c S. Williams 43' c G. Davies 58' c Kalamafoni 66' c Conbeer 73' c Con: Patchell (3) 40', 43', 59'; St. Evans 65'; Costelow 74'	Report	Try: Matthews 4' c Con: Weir 6'; Pen: Weir 21'

Parc y Scarlets
Attendance: 6,006
Referee: Chris Busby

6 March 2022
14:00

Ospreys (Wales)	27–22	(Italy) Zebre Parma (1 BP)
Try: Parry 33' c Morris 36' c Griffiths 69' c Con: Myler (3) 34', 37', 71'; Pen: Myler (2) 4', 63'	Report	Try: Mitchell 55' c Con: Rizzi 55'; Pen: Rizzi (5) 19', 24', 51', 58', 76'

Liberty Stadium
Attendance: 5,068
Referee: Andrew Brace

9 April 2022
13:00

Stormers (South Africa)	19–17	(South Africa) Bulls (1 BP)
Try: Dayimani 43' c Con: Libbok 44'; Pen: Libbok (3) 27', 56', 61'; Drop: Willemse 72'	Report	Try: Moodie 51' c Louw 74' c Con: Smith 52'; Steyn 75'; Pen: Smith 15'

Cape Town Stadium
Referee: Frank Murphy

9 April 2022
15:05

(1 BP) Sharks (South Africa)	37–10	(South Africa) Lions
Try: Grobler 7' c Buthelezi 11' c Mbonambi 60' c Notshe 70' c Con: Bosch (4) 8', 12', 62', 71'; Pen: Bosch (3) 31', 49', 80+1'	Report	Try: Van Wyk 76' c Con: Hendrikse 77'; Pen: Hendrikse 22'

Kings Park Stadium
Referee: Ben Blain

=== Round 14 ===
25 March 2022
16:00

(1 BP) Lions (South Africa)	45–15	(Wales) Ospreys
Try: Maxwane 11' c Van den Berg (2) 38' c, 55' c F. Horn 43' c Rass 68' m Van der Merwe 71' m Warner 77' c Con: Hendrikse (5) 12', 39', 44', 56', 78'	Report	Try: Webb 50' c Collins 64' m Con: J. Thomas 51'; Pen: J. Thomas 31'

Ellis Park Stadium
Attendance: 2,500
Referee: Ben Blain

25 March 2022
19:35

(1 BP) Munster (Ireland)	51–22	(Italy) Benetton
Try: Gallagher 19' c Casey 34' c Zebo 46' c G. Coombes 66' c O'Sullivan 70' c De Allende 78' c Con: Healy (6) 21', 36', 48', 67', 71', 79'; Pen: Healy (3) 8', 42', 59'	Report	Try: Smith 40+1' c Da Re 55' m Braley 80+3' c Con: Smith 40+3'; Coetzee 80+5'; Pen: Smith 24'

Musgrave Park
Attendance: 6,136
Referee: Craig Evans

26 March 2022
13:00

Stormers (South Africa)	23–20	(Ireland) Ulster (1 BP)
Try: De Wet 3' c Zas 7' c Con: Libbok (2) 4', 8'; Pen: Libbok (3) 28', 40+1', 55'	Report	Try: S. Moore 22' c McCloskey 57' c Con: Cooney (2) 23', 58'; Pen: Cooney (2) 33', 39'

Cape Town Stadium
Attendance: 3,544
Referee: Gianluca Gnecchi

26 March 2022
13:00

Zebre Parma (Italy)	24–41	(Wales) Scarlets (1 BP)
Try: Canna 55' c Biondelli 58' c D'Onofrio 77' c Con: Biondelli 56'; Canna 59'; Rizzi 78'; Pen: Canna 26'	Report	Try: Baldwin 22' c Conbeer 29' c McNicholl 34' c Lousi 51' m Lezana 61' c Tuipulotu 72' m Con: Patchell (3) 23', 31', 34'; Costelow 62'; Pen: Patchell 15'

Stadio Sergio Lanfranchi
Attendance: 1,700
Referee: Jaco Peyper

26 March 2022
15:05

Sharks (South Africa)	5–21	(Scotland) Edinburgh
Try: Du Toit 51' m	Report	Try: Kinghorn (2) 20' c, 69' c Boffelli 56' c Con: Kinghorn 22'; Boffelli (2) 57', 70'

Kings Park Stadium
Attendance: 5,120
Referee: Andrea Piardi

26 March 2022
17:15

(1 BP) Bulls (South Africa)	55–20	(Wales) Dragons
Try: Botha 4' c Mapoe (2) 26' c, 65' m Arendse (2) 28' c, 48' m Grobbelaar 38' c Coetzee 56' c Burger 69' c Con: Smith (5) 5', 27', 29', 39', 56'; Steyn 69'; Pen: Smith 10'	Report	Try: Dyer 40+2' m J. Rosser 42' m S. Davies 53' c Con: S. Davies 53'; Pen: S. Davies 24'

Loftus Versfeld Stadium
Attendance: 3,000
Referee: Frank Murphy

26 March 2022
17:15

(1 BP) Cardiff (Wales)	32–28	(Scotland) Glasgow Warriors (2 BP)
Try: Harries 4' m Cabango (2) 34' c, 69' c Halaholo 58' c Con: Evans (3) 35', 58', 69'; Pen: Evans (2) 11', 79'	Report	Try: Cancelliere (2) 15' c, 42' c Johnson 24' c Brown 29' c Con: Thompson (4) 16', 24', 30', 43'

Cardiff Arms Park
Attendance: 6,275
Referee: AJ Jacobs

26 March 2022
19:35

Connacht (Ireland)	8–45	(Ireland) Leinster (1 BP)
Try: O'Halloran 39' m Pen: Carty 22'	Report	Try: O'Loughlin 14' c Hawkshaw 53' c McGrath 56' c Frawley 64' m T. O'Brien (2) 67' m, 77' c Deegan 72' c Con: R. Byrne 15'; Hawkshaw (4) 54', 57', 72', 78'

Galway Sportsgrounds
Attendance: 8,129
Referee: Chris Busby

=== Round 15 ===
1 April 2022
18:30

(1 BP) Sharks (South Africa)	51–3	(Wales) Dragons
Try: Nché 29' c Mbonambi 34' c Kok 48' c Penalty try (2) 60', 64'; Volmink 68' c Con: Bosch (4) 31', 36', 50', 68'; Pen: Bosch (3) 8', 13', 19'	Report	Pen: Lewis 16'

Kings Park Stadium
Attendance: 6,338
Referee: Ben Blain

1 April 2022
19:35

(1 BP) Glasgow Warriors (Scotland)	40–12	(Italy) Zebre Parma
Try: Matthews (3) 4' c, 43' m, 63' c Kebble 10' c Wilson 24' c Dobie 34' c Con: Thompson (5) 5', 11', 26', 34', 64'	Report	Try: Fusco 40+1' m Andreani 79' c Con: Rizzi 79'

Scotstoun Stadium
Attendance: 6,927
Referee: Adam Jones

2 April 2022
13:00

(1 BP) Bulls (South Africa)	34–16	(Ireland) Ulster
Try: Coetzee 44' c Tambwe 57' c Grobbelaar 66' c Arendse 76' c Con: Smith (2) 44', 57'; Steyn (2) 67', 77'; Pen: Smith (2) 25', 53'	Report	Try: Marshall 65' c Con: Doak 65'; Pen: Doak (3) 11', 32', 37'

Loftus Versfeld Stadium
Attendance: 19,436
Referee: Andrea Piardi

2 April 2022
13:00

(1 BP) Benetton (Italy)	17–21	(Ireland) Connacht
Try: Padovani 49' c Halafihi 69' c Con: Da Re (2) 50', 71'; Pen: Da Re 9'	Report	Try: Prendergast 2' c Murray 19' c Tuimauga 76' c Con: Carty (3) 2', 20', 77'

Stadio Comunale di Monigo
Referee: Pierre Brousset

2 April 2022
15:05

Lions (South Africa)	15–9	(Scotland) Edinburgh (1 BP)
Try: Hendrikse 30' m E. Tshituka 52' c Con: Hendrikse 53'; Pen: Hendrikse 68'	Report	Pen: Boffelli (2) 29', 64'; Drop: Immelman 12'

Ellis Park Stadium
Referee: Gianluca Gnecchi

2 April 2022
17:15

(1 BP) Stormers (South Africa)	29–13	(Wales) Ospreys
Try: De Wet 6' c Smith 9' c Zas (2) 28' m, 54' c Con: Libbok (3) 6', 10', 56'; Pen: Libbok 40'	Report	Try: Nagy 80+1' c Con: Anscombe 80+2'; Pen: Anscombe (2) 3', 18'

Cape Town Stadium
Attendance: 4,951
Referee: Frank Murphy

2 April 2022
19:00

Munster (Ireland)	19–34	(Ireland) Leinster (1 BP)
Try: De Allende 64' c Con: Carbery 64'; Pen: Carbery (4) 13', 21', 28', 37'	Report	Try: Ringrose 17' m Lowe (2) 48' m, 74' m J. O'Brien 58' c Con: R. Byrne 60'; Pen: R. Byrne (4) 10', 26', 40+3', 55'

Thomond Park
Attendance: 20,657
Referee: Christophe Ridley

2 April 2022
19:35

Scarlets (Wales)	35–20	(Wales) Cardiff
Try: Costelow 22' c McNicholl (2) 32' m, 52' c Kalamafoni 45' c Con: Costelow (3) 22', 45', 53'; Pen: Costelow (3) 7', 50', 74'	Report	Try: Adams 13' c Botham 78' c Con: Evans 15'; Priestland 79'; Pen: Evans (2) 4', 29'

Parc y Scarlets
Attendance: 7,087
Referee: Tual Trainini

=== Round 16 ===
22 April 2022
17:15

(1 BP) Stormers (South Africa)	32–7	(Scotland) Glasgow Warriors
Try: Pretorius 35' c Jantjies 53' m Zas 56' c Roos 80' c Con: Libbok (3) 36', 57', 80+2'; Pen: Libbok (2) 31', 39'	Report	Try: Dempsey 19' c Con: Thompson 20'

Cape Town Stadium
Attendance: 4,762
Referee: Andrew Brace

22 April 2022
19:35

(1 BP) Ulster (Ireland)	17–24	(Ireland) Munster
Try: Herring 48' c Reidy 75' c Con: Cooney 49'; Doak 76'; Pen: Cooney 8'	Report	Try: Archer 22' c Earls 28' m Con: Carbery 23'; Pen: Carbery (4) 12', 44', 60', 80'

Ravenhill Stadium
Attendance: 12,131
Referee: Jaco Peyper

22 April 2022
19:45

(1 BP) Edinburgh (Scotland)	29–26	(Italy) Zebre Parma (1 BP)
Try: Bennett (2) 1' c, 61' m Hutchison 39' c Schoeman 52' c Con: Van der Walt (3) 2', 40+1', 53'; Pen: Van der Walt 78'	Report	Try: Laloifi 35' m Gesi 42' c Sisi 74' c Con: Rizzi 43'; O'Malley 75'

Edinburgh Rugby Stadium
Attendance: 5,818
Referee: Frank Murphy

23 April 2022
13:00

(1 BP) Bulls (South Africa)	46–29	(Italy) Benetton
Try: Brink 25' m Arendse (2) 40+1' c, 49' c Coetzee 60' c Moodie 75' c Matanzima 80' c Con: Smith (3) 40+2', 50', 61'; Steyn (2) 75', 80+1'; Pen: Smith (2) 48', 69'	Report	Try: Menoncello (2) 11' c, 77' c Con: Smith (2) 12', 77'; Pen: Smith (5) 7', 19', 32', 45', 65'

Loftus Versfeld Stadium
Attendance: 8,932
Referee: Mike Adamson

23 April 2022
15:00

Dragons (Wales)	19–38	(Wales) Scarlets (1 BP)
Try: Dixon 35' c J. Williams 50' m Warren 61' c Con: S. Davies (2) 35', 61'	Report	Try: Lousi 12' m O'Brien (2) 15' c, 80' c Elias 29' m R. Evans 66' c Baldwin 76' c Con: Patchell (4) 16', 67', 77', 80+2'

Rodney Parade
Attendance: 4,719
Referee: Sam Grove-White

23 April 2022
15:05

(2 BP) Lions (South Africa)	30–33	(Ireland) Connacht
Try: Maxwane 38' m Van den Berg 54' c Van der Merwe 66' m Odendaal 70' c Con: Hendrikse (2) 55', 71'; Pen: Hendrikse (2) 18', 47'	Report	Try: Prendergast 3' c Penalty try 9'; Daly 62' c Con: Carty (2) 3', 63'; Pen: Carty (4) 43', 51', 60', 76'

Ellis Park Stadium
Attendance: 2,500
Referee: Craig Evans

23 April 2022
17:15

(1 BP) Sharks (South Africa)	28–23	(Ireland) Leinster
Try: Mapimpi 20' c Hendrikse 39' c Mbonambi 48' c Buthelezi 65' c Con: Bosch (4) 21', 40+1', 50', 66'	Report	Try: Penny 17' c T. O'Brien 36' c Con: Frawley (2) 18', 37'; Pen: Frawley (3) 28', 43', 53'

Kings Park Stadium
Attendance: 21,832
Referee: Nika Amashukeli

23 April 2022
17:15

Cardiff (Wales)	6–22	(Wales) Ospreys
Pen: Priestland (2) 28', 44'	Report	Try: Lake 54' c Webb 61' c Parry 66' m Con: Anscombe (2) 56', 61'; Pen: Anscombe 48'

Cardiff Arms Park
Attendance: 10,075
Referee: Gianluca Gnecchi

=== Round 17 ===
29 April 2022
18:00

(1 BP) Bulls (South Africa)	29–17	(Scotland) Glasgow Warriors
Try: Burger 10' c Tambwe 40+3' c Wa. Steenkamp 59' c Brink 62' m Con: Steyn (3) 10', 40+4', 59'; Pen: Steyn 29'	Report	Try: Penalty try 6'; Smith 74' c Con: Thompson 75'; Pen: Weir 21'

Loftus Versfeld Stadium
Referee: Nika Amashukeli

29 April 2022
19:35

(1 BP) Munster (Ireland)	42–21	(Wales) Cardiff
Try: Haley (2) 6' c, 26' c Ahern 40' c Casey (2) 63' c, 77' m Con: Healy (3) 7', 27', 40+2'; Carbery 64'; Pen: Healy (3) 19', 33', 61'	Report	Try: Davies 2' c Lee-Lo 12' c L. Williams 56' c Con: Evans (3) 4', 14', 57'

Musgrave Park
Attendance: 7,325
Referee: Sam Grove-White

30 April 2022
13:00

(1 BP) Lions (South Africa)	37–29	(Italy) Benetton (1 BP)
Try: Schoeman 14' m Van den Berg 40+2' c Van der Merwe 42' c Pienaar 53' m Hendrikse 63' c Con: Hendrikse (3) 40+3', 42', 63'; Pen: Hendrikse (2) 2', 68'	Report	Try: Smith (2) 25' c, 38' m Drago 31' c L. Cannone 80+4' c Con: Smith (3) 26', 31', 80+5'; Drop: Albornoz 17'

Ellis Park Stadium
Referee: Andrew Brace

30 April 2022
15:05

(1 BP) Sharks (South Africa)	41–21	(Ireland) Connacht
Try: Grobler (2) 24' c, 54' c Louw 45' c Mbonambi 49' c Roets 77' c Con: Bosch (5) 26', 46', 50', 55', 78'; Pen: Bosch (2) 15', 74'	Report	Try: Thornbury 27' m Blade 36' c Con: Fitzgerald 37'; Pen: Fitzgerald (3) 8', 21', 32'

Kings Park Stadium
Referee: Mike Adamson

30 April 2022
15:05

Zebre Parma (Italy)	23–18	(Wales) Dragons (1 BP)
Try: Bigi 24' m Penalty try 64'; Gesi 75' m Pen: Rizzi (2) 12', 17'	Report	Try: Jones 54' m Rosser 59' c Con: S. Davies 59'; Pen: S. Davies (2) 6', 15'

Stadio Sergio Lanfranchi
Attendance: 3,200
Referee: Chris Busby

30 April 2022
16:15

Stormers (South Africa)	20–13	(Ireland) Leinster (1 BP)
Try: Gelant 45' m Senatla 53' m Penalty try 66'; Pen: Libbok 16'	Report	Try: E. Byrne 60' c Con: H. Byrne 61'; Pen: Frawley (2) 18', 20'

Cape Town Stadium
Attendance: 13,156
Referee: Craig Evans

30 April 2022
17:15

(1 BP) Ospreys (Wales)	54–36	(Wales) Scarlets (1 BP)
Try: Smith 16' c Morris 27' c Giles 45' c Lake (2) 50' m, 54' c Collins 58' c Watkin 69' c Parry 80' c Con: Anscombe (7) 18', 28', 47', 56', 59', 70', 80'	Report	Try: G. Davies 20' c Conbeer (3) 24' c, 34' c, 76' m Hardy 72' c Con: Costelow (3) 21', 25', 35'; Patchell 72'; Pen: Costelow 8'

Liberty Stadium
Attendance: 10,141
Referee: Jaco Peyper

30 April 2022
19:35

(1 BP) Edinburgh (Scotland)	10–16	(Ireland) Ulster
Try: Bennett 68' c Con: Boffelli 69'; Pen: Boffelli 42'	Report	Try: Baloucoune 14' c Con: Doak 15'; Pen: Doak (3) 20', 34', 49'

Edinburgh Rugby Stadium
Attendance: 7,774
Referee: Ben Whitehouse

=== Round 18 ===
20 May 2022
18:00

(1 BP) Benetton (Italy)	69–21	(Wales) Cardiff
Try: L. Cannone 13' c Albornoz (2) 16' c, 50' m Lamaro 20' c Braley (2) 32' c, 55' c Smith (2) 68' c, 77' c Ruzza 70' m Pettinelli 73' c Con: Smith (8) 14', 18', 20', 33', 57', 70', 74', 78'; Pen: Smith 25'	Report	Try: Carré (2) 37' c, 45' c Llewellyn 61' c Con: Priestland (3) 38', 46', 61'

Stadio Comunale di Monigo
Attendance: 1,986
Referee: Eoghan Cross

20 May 2022
19:35

Ulster (Ireland)	24–21	(South Africa) Sharks (1 BP)
Try: Lowry 27' c McCloskey 45' c Hume 65' c Con: Cooney (3) 28', 45', 66'; Pen: Cooney 17'	Report	Try: N. Mchunu 62' c Louw 77' c Williams 80' c Con: Bosch 63'; Chamberlain 77'; Williams 80'

Ravenhill Stadium
Referee: Ben Blain

20 May 2022
20:10

(2 BP) Ospreys (Wales)	31–38	(South Africa) Bulls (1 BP)
Try: J. Morgan 38' c L. Morgan (2) 57' c, 79' c Parry 78' c Con: Anscombe (4) 39', 58', 78', 80'; Pen: Anscombe 33'	Report	Try: Tambwe 4' m Smith 20' c Moodie 42' c Hendricks (3) 47' c, 63' c, 66' m Con: Smith (4) 21', 43', 48', 63'

Liberty Stadium
Attendance: 5,795
Referee: Chris Busby

21 May 2022
15:00

Dragons (Wales)	11–21	(South Africa) Lions
Try: Dyer 22' m Pen: Reed (2) 32', 42'	Report	Try: Van der Merwe 29' c Venter 45' c Dreyer 53' c Con: Hendrikse (3) 30', 46', 53'

Rodney Parade
Attendance: 4,729
Referee: Joy Neville

21 May 2022
17:00

(1 BP) Connacht (Ireland)	22–20	(Italy) Zebre Parma (1 BP)
Try: Marmion 7' m Murray 17' m Masterson 26' c Porch 49' m Con: Carty 27'	Report	Try: Pani 42' m Nocera 68' m Lucchin 78' c Con: Canna 79'; Pen: Canna 4'

Galway Sportsgrounds
Referee: Adam Jones

21 May 2022
17:10

(1 BP) Scarlets (Wales)	21–26	(South Africa) Stormers (1 BP)
Try: J. Williams 7' c Conbeer 72' m Con: Costelow 8'; Pen: Costelow (3) 4', 17', 28'	Report	Try: Zas 14' c Roos 38' c Nel (2) 42' c, 80' m Con: Libbok (3) 15', 39', 43'

Parc y Scarlets
Attendance: 7,386
Referee: Sam Grove-White

21 May 2022
18:30

Edinburgh (Scotland)	28–11	(Scotland) Glasgow Warriors
Try: Kinghorn 30' c Bradbury 45' m Hoyland 63' m Con: Boffelli (2) 31', 65'; Pen: Boffelli (3) 15', 40', 54'	Report	Try: Smith 68' m Pen: Thompson (2) 21', 37'

Murrayfield Stadium
Attendance: 24,187
Referee: Andrew Brace

21 May 2022
19:15

(1 BP) Leinster (Ireland)	35–25	(Ireland) Munster
Try: Penny 2' m Foley 23' c Penalty try 52'; O'Loughlin 54' c Con: H. Byrne (2) 23', 55'; Pen: H. Byrne (3) 9', 46', 71'	Report	Try: O'Donoghue 12' m Haley 17' c Murray 41' c Con: Carbery (2) 17', 42'; Pen: Carbery (2) 49', 61'

Aviva Stadium
Attendance: 32,411
Referee: Frank Murphy

== Play-offs ==
=== Bracket ===
Quarter-finals
1	(Ireland) Leinster	76
8	(Scotland) Glasgow Warriors	14
4	(South Africa) Bulls	30
5	(South Africa) Sharks	27
2	(South Africa) Stormers	28
7	(Scotland) Edinburgh	17
3	(Ireland) Ulster	36
6	(Ireland) Munster	17

Semi-finals
1	(Ireland) Leinster	26
4	(South Africa) Bulls	27
2	(South Africa) Stormers	17
3	(Ireland) Ulster	15

Final
4	(South Africa) Bulls	13
2	(South Africa) Stormers	18

The play-off draw was seeded by final finishing position in the regular season table

=== Quarter-finals ===
3 June 2022
19:35

Ulster (Ireland)	36–17	(Ireland) Munster
Try: Cooney 11' c S. Moore (2) 25' c, 33' m Timoney 43' c Hume 62' c Con: Cooney (3) 11', 26', 44'; Doak 62'; Pen: Cooney 57'	Report	Try: Kleyn 19' c Earls (2) 53' m, 70' m Con: Carbery 19'

Ravenhill Stadium
Attendance: 10,252
Referee: Jaco Peyper

4 June 2022
13:35

Bulls (South Africa)	30–27	(South Africa) Sharks
Try: Tambwe 13' c Coetzee 45' c Hendricks 51' c Con: Smith (3) 13', 46', 52'; Pen: Smith (2) 20', 33'; Drop: Smith 80+4'	Report	Try: Mbonambi 16' c Hendrikse 58' c Notshe 75' c Con: Bosch (3) 17', 60', 76'; Pen: Bosch (2) 5', 40'

Loftus Versfeld
Attendance: 22,394
Referee: Andrew Brace

4 June 2022
15:35

Leinster (Ireland)	76–14	(Scotland) Glasgow Warriors
Try: Sheehan (2) 16' c, 39' m Larmour (2) 20' c, 64' m N. McCarthy 24' c Doris 43' c Alaalatoa 48' c Gibson-Park 54' c Ringrose 57' m Frawley 69' c McGrath 71' c J. O'Brien 77' m Con: R. Byrne (8) 17', 20', 26', 44', 49', 55', 70', 71'	Report	Try: Z. Fagerson 5' c Horne 60' c Con: Thompson (2) 5', 60'

RDS Arena
Attendance: 9,346
Referee: Andrea Piardi

4 June 2022
19:35

Stormers (South Africa)	28–17	(Scotland) Edinburgh
Try: Gelant 3' c Nel 44' c Roos 54' m Con: Libbok (2) 4', 45'; Pen: Libbok (3) 12' 52' 69'	Report	Try: Cherry 15' c Pyrgos 56' c Con: Boffelli (2) 17', 57'

Cape Town Stadium
Referee: Frank Murphy

=== Semi-finals ===
10 June 2022
19:35

Leinster (Ireland)	26–27	(South Africa) Bulls
Try: Sheehan 10' c Henshaw 33' c O'Loughlin 71' m Healy 80+3' c Con: R. Byrne (2) 11', 34'; Sexton 80+3'	Report	Try: Grobbelaar 20' c Coetzee 25' c Penalty try 53'; Con: Smith (2) 21', 26'; Pen: Smith 14'; Steyn 77'

RDS Arena
Attendance: 11,565
Referee: Andrea Piardi

11 June 2022
15:00

Stormers (South Africa)	17–15	(Ireland) Ulster
Try: Kotze 5' m Roos 14' m Gelant 80+5' c Con: Libbok 80+7'	Report	Try: Baloucoune 18' m S. Moore 28' c Con: Cooney 29'; Pen: Cooney 40+1'

Cape Town Stadium
Attendance: 30,000
Referee: Mike Adamson

=== Championship final ===
The first United Rugby Championship Final was an all-South African derby, ensuring the first ever South African winner of the tournament, the Bulls having narrowly missed out on winning the transitional Pro14 Rainbow Cup competition. It also marked the first time in the history of the competition that a Grand final play-off match has not included at least one Irish province, a run of 14 finals.

18 June 2022
19:35

Stormers (South Africa)	18–13	(South Africa) Bulls
Try: Roos 45' c Venter 57' m Con: Libbok 46'; Pen: Libbok 43'; Drop: Libbok 75'	Report	Try: Vorster 3' c Con: Smith 4'; Pen: Smith (2) 43', 65'

Cape Town Stadium
Attendance: 31,000
Referee: Andrew Brace

== Attendances by club ==
Club	Home games	Total	Average	Highest	Lowest	% Capacity
(Italy) Benetton	0	0	0	0	0	0%
(South Africa) Bulls	9	35,782	5,112	19,436	2,000	9.88%
(Wales) Cardiff	4	29,372	7,343	8,194	5,292	60.56%
(Ireland) Connacht	8 (Note: Excludes one match in which an official attendance was not reported.)	40,140	5,018	9,875	3,007	48.93%
(Wales) Dragons	4	22,671	5,668	6,398	5,043	65.15%
(Scotland) Edinburgh	5	46,852	5,666	24,187	5,330	72.64%
(Scotland) Glasgow Warriors	0	0	0	0	0	0%
(Ireland) Leinster	11	155,512	14,138	32,411	8,559	60.32% (Note: Includes two matches at 51,700 cap Aviva Stadium.)
(South Africa) Lions	0	0	0	0	0	0%
(Ireland) Munster	9	102,101	11,345	20,657	5,000	66.09% (Note: Includes one match in which Thomond Park attendance was limited to 5000 and two matches at 8,008 capacity Musgrave Park.)
(Wales) Ospreys	4	22,426	5,607	5,767	5,286	26.92%
(Wales) Scarlets	3	20,234	6,745	7,824	6,074	45.36%
(South Africa) Sharks	0	0	0	21,832	0	0%
(South Africa) Stormers	0	0	0	0	0	0%
(Ireland) Ulster	8 (Note: Excludes two matches in which an official attendance was not reported.)	91,752	11,469	16,274	9,542	63.03%
(Italy) Zebre Parma	5	7,700	1,540	2,000	1,300	30.80%

=== Highest attendances ===
Date	Game	Stadium	Attendance
21 May 2022	Leinster (H) v Munster	Aviva Stadium	32,411
18 June 2022	Stormers (H) v Bulls	Cape Town Stadium	31,000
11 June 2022	Stormers (H) v Ulster	Cape Town Stadium	30,000
21 May 2022	Edinburgh (H) v Glasgow	Murrayfield Stadium	24,187
23 April 2022	Sharks (H) v Leinster	Kings Park Stadium	21,832
2 April 2022	Munster (H) v Leinster	Thomond Park	20,657
2 April 2022	Bulls (H) v Ulster	Loftus Versfeld Stadium	19,436

== End of Season Awards ==
=== URC Dream Team ===
The 2021–22 United Rugby Championship Dream team is:

Pos		Player	Team
FB	15	(South Africa) Warrick Gelant	(South Africa) Stormers
RW	14	(South Africa) Seabelo Senatla	(South Africa) Stormers
OC	13	(Ireland) James Hume	(Ireland) Ulster
IC	12	(South Africa) Damian Willemse	(South Africa) Stormers
LW	11	(South Africa) Leolin Zas	(South Africa) Stormers
FH	10	(Ireland) Ross Byrne	(Ireland) Leinster
SH	9	(Ireland) Craig Casey	(Ireland) Munster
N8	8	(South Africa) Evan Roos	(South Africa) Stormers
OF	7	(Ireland) Nick Timoney	(Ireland) Ulster
BF	6	(South Africa) Marcell Coetzee	(South Africa) Bulls
RL	5	(South Africa) Ruan Nortjé	(South Africa) Bulls
LL	4	(Ireland) Jean Kleyn	(Ireland) Munster
TP	3	(South Africa) Thomas du Toit	(South Africa) Sharks
HK	2	(South Africa) Johan Grobbelaar	(South Africa) Bulls
LP	1	(South Africa) Ox Nché	(South Africa) Sharks

=== Award winners ===
The 2021–22 URC award winners were:

Award	Winner
Players' Player of the Season	(South Africa) Evan Roos (Stormers)
Next-Gen Player of the Season	(South Africa) Evan Roos (Stormers)
Fans' Player of the Season	(South Africa) Evan Roos (Stormers)
Golden Boot	(Wales) Gareth Anscombe (Ospreys)
Top Try Scorer	(South Africa) Marcell Coetzee (Bulls) (South Africa) Leolin Zas (Stormers)
Tackle Machine	(Ireland) Alan O'Connor (Ulster)
Turnover King	(Wales) Jac Morgan (Ospreys)
Ironman Award	(South Africa) Ruan Nortjé (Bulls)
Coach of the Season	(Ireland) Leo Cullen (Leinster)

== Leading scorers ==
Note: Flags to the left of player names indicate national team as has been defined under World Rugby eligibility rules, or primary nationality for players who have not yet earned international senior caps. Players may hold one or more non-WR nationalities.

=== Most points ===
As of 12 July 2022

Rank	Player	Club	Points
1	(South Africa) Manie Libbok	(South Africa) Stormers	171
2	(South Africa) Chris Smith	(South Africa) Bulls	153
3	(South Africa) Rhyno Smith	(Italy) Benetton	142
4	(South Africa) Curwin Bosch	(South Africa) Sharks	138
5	(Ireland) Ross Byrne	(Ireland) Leinster	125

=== Most tries ===
As of 12 July 2022

Rank	Player	Club	Tries
1	(South Africa) Marcell Coetzee	(South Africa) Bulls	11
1	(South Africa) Leolin Zas	(South Africa) Stormers	11
3	(South Africa) Rhyno Smith	(Italy) Benetton	10
4	(South Africa) Johan Grobbelaar	(South Africa) Bulls	9
4	(South Africa) Seabelo Senatla	(South Africa) Stormers	9

== Referees ==
The following referees have officiated at least one match during the 2021–22 season. Numbers in brackets denote the number of matches officiated during 2021–22. Correct as on fixtures played on 18 June 2022.

- (Ireland) Andrew Brace (14)
- (Ireland) Frank Murphy (14)
- (Ireland) Chris Busby (13)
- (Wales) Craig Evans (11)
- (Scotland) Sam Grove-White (10)
- (Wales) Adam Jones (10)
- (Italy) Andrea Piardi (10)
- (Wales) Ben Whitehouse (10)
- (Scotland) Ben Blain (9)
- (Scotland) Mike Adamson (8)
- (Italy) Gianluca Gnecchi (7)
- (South Africa) Jaco Peyper (7)
- (South Africa) Marius van der Westhuizen (7)
- (South Africa) AJ Jacobs (5)
- (Scotland) Hollie Davidson (3)
- (Georgia (country)) Nika Amashukeli (2)
- (South Africa) Aimee Barrett-Theron (2)
- (South Africa) Rasta Rasivhenge (2)
- (Australia) Nic Berry (1)
- (France) Pierre Brousset (1)
- (Ireland) Eoghan Cross (1)
- (Ireland) Joy Neville (1)
- (Wales) Gareth Newman (1)
- (England) Christophe Ridley (1)
- (France) Tual Trainini (1)
