= Marcell Coetzee =

South Africa international rugby union player

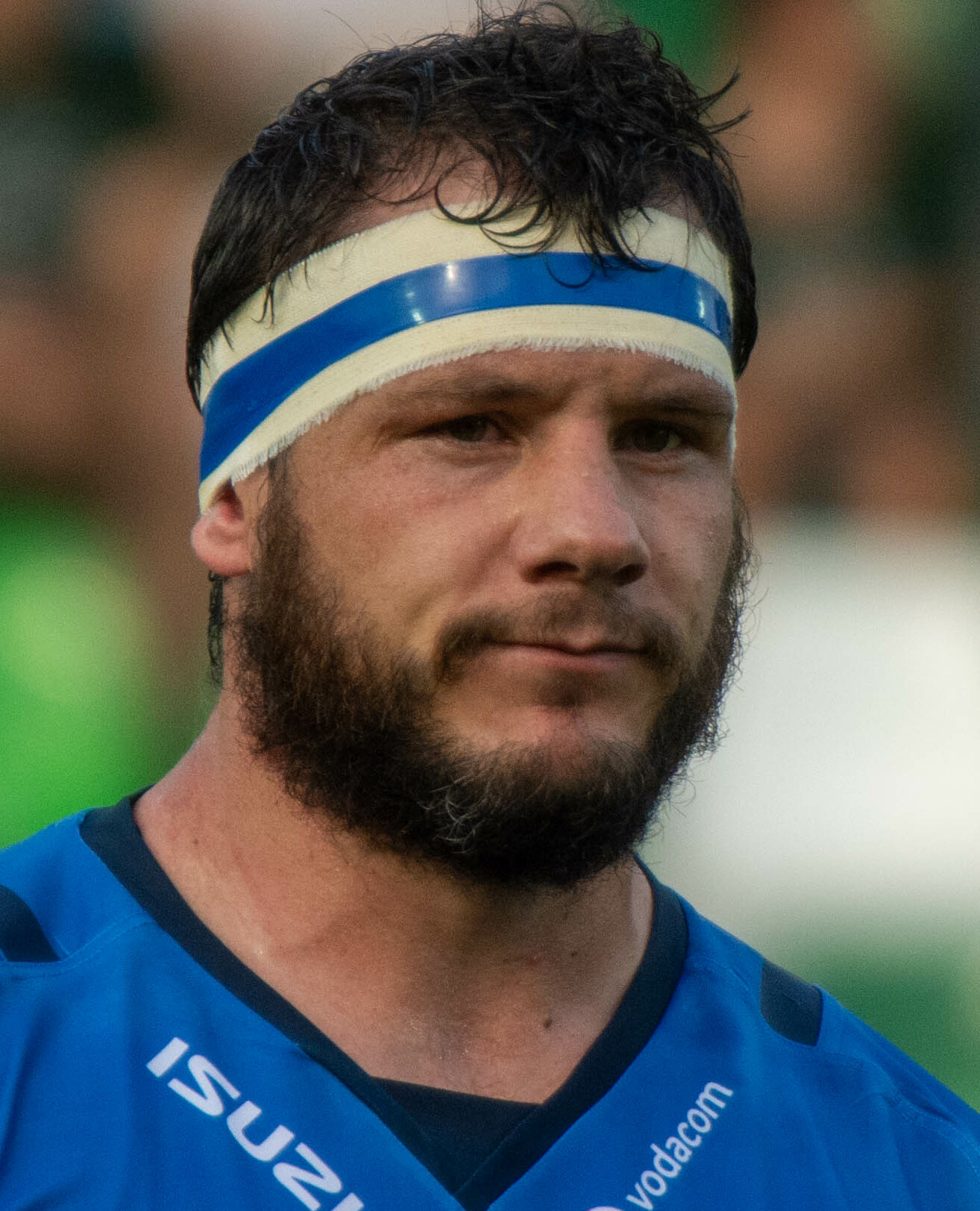
- Full name: Marcell Cornelius Coetzee
- Born: 8 May 1991 (age 35) Potchefstroom, Transvaal, South Africa
- Height: 1.93 m (6 ft 4 in)
- Weight: 117 kg (18 st 6 lb; 258 lb)
- School: Port Natal High School

Rugby union career
- Position: Flanker
- Current team: Bulls / Blue Bulls
Youth career
- 2010–2011: Sharks
Senior career
Years	Team	Apps	(Points)
2011–2013	Sharks XV	8	(15)
2011–2013	Sharks (Currie Cup)	24	(5)
2011–2016	Sharks	74	(70)
2015–2016	Honda Heat	9	(15)
2016–2021	Ulster	57	(75)
2021–	Bulls	60	(80)
2021–	Blue Bulls	8	(10)
2022–2023	Kobelco Kobe Steelers	10	(20)
- Correct as of 4 January 2023
International career
Years	Team	Apps	(Points)
2012–	South Africa	31	(30)
2015	Springbok XV	1	(0)
- Correct as of 4 January 2023

Marcell Cornelius Coetzee (born 8 May 1991) is a South African professional rugby footballer for the Bulls in the United Rugby Championship. He plays as a flanker.

== South Africa ==
Coetzee made his debut in Super Rugby for the Sharks against the Brumbies on Saturday 7 May 2011. He has offloading skills that have been likened to those of Sonny Bill Williams.

Heyneke Meyer, Springboks coach, included him in the national squad to face England in a test series where Coetzee made his Springbok test debut on 9 June 2012 in Durban.

== Top League ==
Coetzee joined Japanese Top League side Honda Heat for the 2015–2016 season.

== Ulster Rugby ==
In February 2016, it was announced that he would join Irish Pro12 side Ulster on a three-year deal starting in the 2016–2017 season. Coetzee featured sparingly in his first two seasons with Ulster, due to recurring knee injury problems. Coetzee was the 2020–21 joint top try-scorer (9) and the 2020–21 Pro14 Players' Player of the Season in his final season with Ulster.

== Return to South Africa ==
In December 2020 the Bulls confirmed that Coetzee would join the franchise in June 2021 on a three-year deal.

== Honours ==
- Currie Cup winner 2021
- Pro14 Rainbow Cup runner-up 2021
- United Rugby Championship runner-up 2021–22
- Players' Player of the Season Guinness PRO14 2020–21
- Top try scorer United Rugby Championship 2020–21, 2021–22
- Selected in the United Rugby Championship "Dream Team" 2020–21, 2021–22

== Springbok statistics ==
=== Test Match Record ===
Against	Pld	W	D	L	Tri	Con	Pen	DG	Pts	%Won
Argentina	4	3	1	0	2	0	0	0	10	75
Australia	4	2	0	2	1	0	0	0	5	50
England	5	4	1	0	0	0	0	0	0	80
Ireland	2	1	0	1	1	0	0	0	5	50
Italy	2	2	0	0	0	0	0	0	0	100
New Zealand	4	1	0	3	0	0	0	0	0	25
Scotland	4	4	0	0	2	0	0	0	10	100
Wales	1	0	0	1	0	0	0	0	0	0
Total	26	17	2	7	6	0	0	0	30	65.38

Pld = Games Played, W = Games Won, D = Games Drawn, L = Games Lost, Tri = Tries Scored, Con = Conversions, Pen = Penalties, DG = Drop Goals, Pts = Points Scored

=== International Tries ===
Try	Opposing team	Location	Venue	Competition	Date	Result
1	Argentina	Cape Town, South Africa	Newlands Stadium	2012 Rugby Championship	18 August 2012	Won 27-6
2	Scotland	Port Elizabeth, South Africa	Nelson Mandela Bay Stadium	Mid-year rugby test series	28 June 2014	Won 55-6
3	Scotland	Port Elizabeth, South Africa	Nelson Mandela Bay Stadium	Mid-year rugby test series	28 June 2014	Won 55-6
4	Argentina	Salta, Argentina	Estadio Padre Ernesto Martearena	2014 Rugby Championship	23 August 2014	Won 33-31
5	Australia	Cape Town, South Africa	Newlands Stadium	2014 Rugby Championship	27 September 2014	Won 28-10
6	Ireland	Dublin, Ireland	Aviva Stadium	End-of-year rugby test series	8 November 2014	Lost 15-29
