= Craig Evans (rugby union referee) =

Welsh rugby union referee

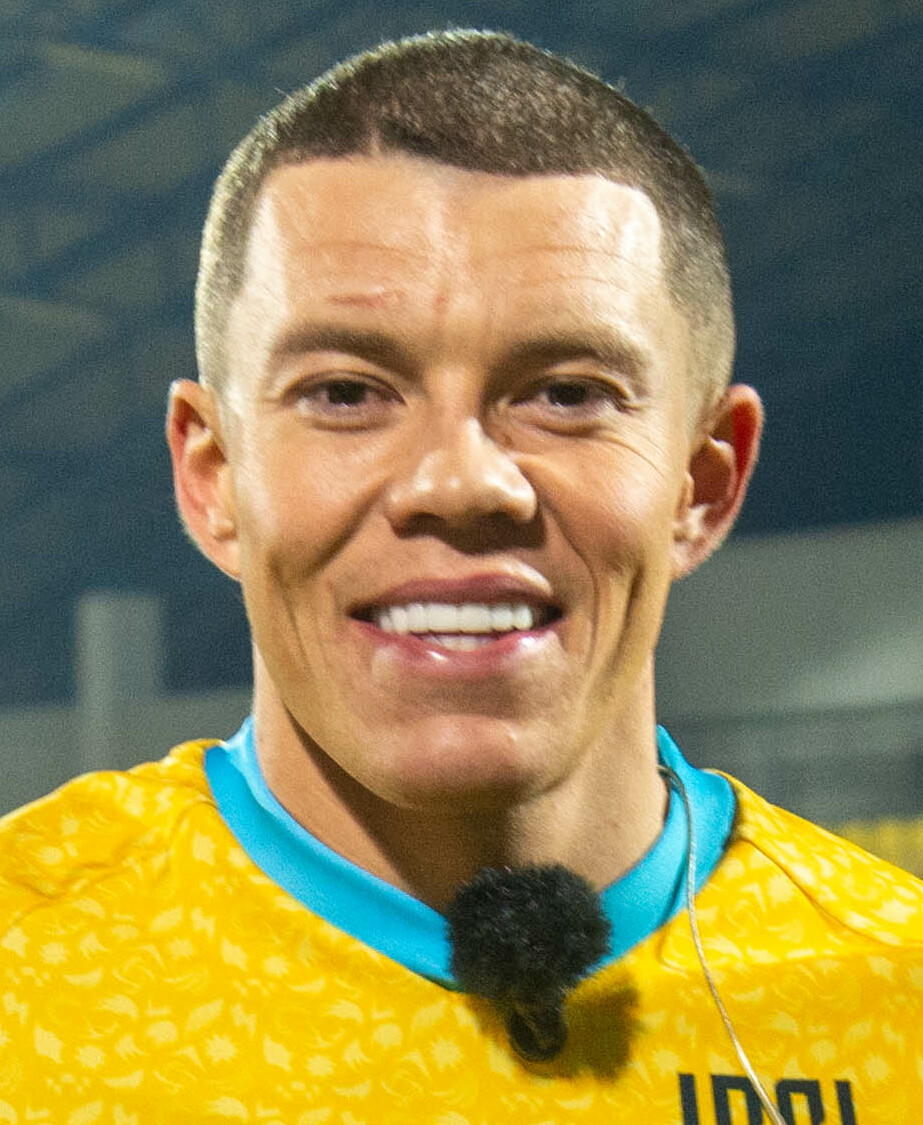
- Full name: Martin Craig Evans
- Born: 12 October 1991 (age 35) Neath, Wales

Rugby union career
Refereeing career
Years	Competition	Apps
2018–	United Rugby Championship	24

Craig Evans (born 12 October 1991 in Neath) is a Welsh rugby referee. He has been a member of Wales' professional rugby union ranks since 2015.

== Career ==
Evans, who began refereeing as a teenager, began refereeing on the World Rugby Sevens Series in 2016. He refereed during the 2020 Olympics, before committing to the 15-aside game full time. He made his Pro14 refereeing debut in 2018, and would be awarded his first Six Nations Championship match for the match between Italy and Ireland in the 2021 Six Nations Championship. He was appointed to the Tier One select group of referees in June 2021.
