= Joe Davies (rugby union) =

Welsh rugby union player

- Born: Joseph Davies; 13 November 1995 (age 31) Newport, Wales
- Height: 198 cm (6 ft 6 in)
- Weight: 121 kg (19 st 1 lb)
- School: Caldicot school, Newport high
- University: Cardiff Met

Rugby union career
- Position: lock
- Current team: Dragons
Senior career
Years	Team	Apps	(Points)
2013-	Dragons	123	(5)
- Correct as of 16:54, 5 February 2024 (UTC)
International career
Years	Team	Apps	(Points)
2014-15	Wales U20	11	(0)
- Correct as of 28 Jan 2015

Joe Davies (born 13 November 1995) is a Welsh rugby union player who plays for the Dragons regional team as a lock forward having previously played for Bedwas RFC and Newport RFC. He is a Wales under-20 international.
