= Eoghan Cross =

Irish rugby union referee

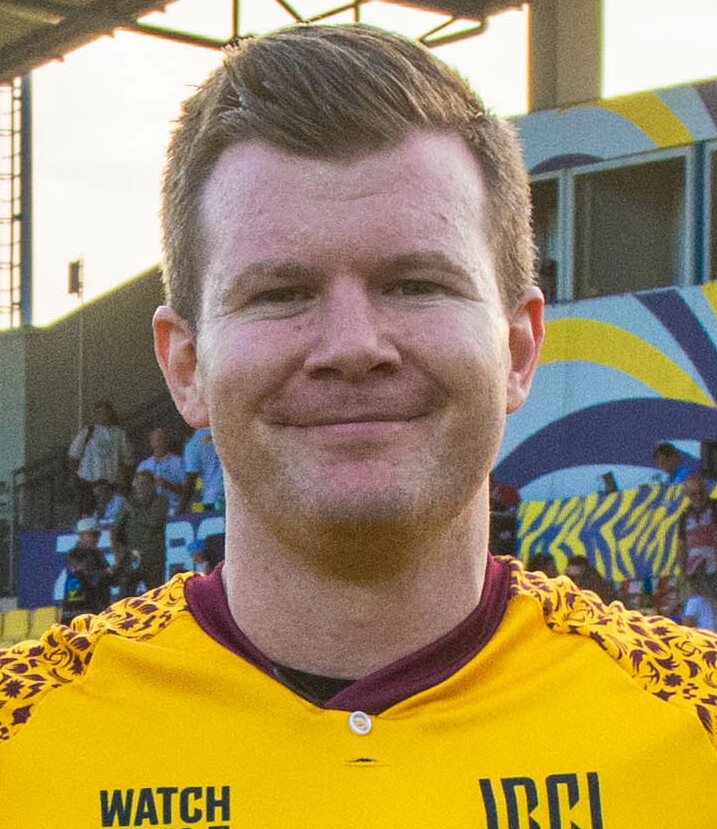
- Born: Limerick, Ireland

Rugby union career
Refereeing career
Years	Competition	Apps
2022–	United Rugby Championship	1

Eoghan Cross is an Irish rugby referee. He is a member of Ireland's referee High Performance Panel.

== Career ==
Cross, born in Limerick, has been refereeing since 2016, being named Munster Rugby Referee of the year in 2020. He made his debut refereeing in the United Rugby Championship in Round 18 of the 2021–22 United Rugby Championship, officiating the fixture between Benetton and Cardiff. He had previously officiated matches during the 2022 Six Nations Under 20s Championship.
