= Will Reed =

Welsh rugby union player

- Born: Will Reed; 3 November 2001 (age 25) Wales
- Height: 1.76 m (5 ft 9 in)
- Weight: 80 kg (12 st 8 lb)

Rugby union career
- Position: Fly-half / Fullback
- Current team: Worcester Warriors
Senior career
Years	Team	Apps	(Points)
2021–2025	Dragons	45	(141)
2025	Worcester Warriors	19	(136)
International career
Years	Team	Apps	(Points)
2021	Wales U20	5	(2)

Will Reed (born 3 November 2001) is a Welsh rugby union player for Worcester Warriors for the 2025-26 season. Reed's primary position is fly-half or fullback.

== Rugby Union career ==
=== Professional career ===
Reed was named in the Dragons academy squad for the 2021–22 season. He made his debut for the Dragons in Round 14 of the 2021–22 United Rugby Championship against the Bulls.

On 16th April 2024 Reed signed a contract extension with the Dragons for one year.

For the 2025-26 season, he signed a new contract with Worcester Warriors as part of their rebuilding.
