= Chris Busby (rugby union) =

Irish rugby union referee

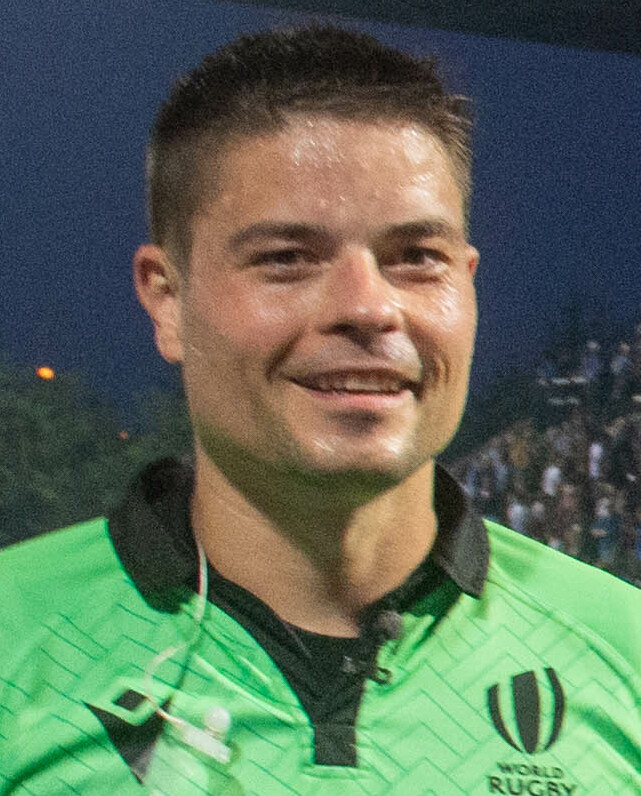
- Born: Antrim, County Antrim, Northern Ireland

Rugby union career
Refereeing career
Years	Competition	Apps
2020–2025	United Rugby Championship	12

Chris Busby is an Irish rugby referee. He is a member of Ireland's referee High Performance Panel.

== Career ==
Busby, born in Antrim, County Antrim, has been refereeing for over 7 years. He made his Pro14 refereeing debut on 9 October 2020 refereeing the match between Zebre and Dragons.

In January 2025, it was reported that Busby was retiring from rugby, subsequent to an incident where Mack Hansen publicly criticised him after a United Rugby Championship match.
