= Sam Grove-White =

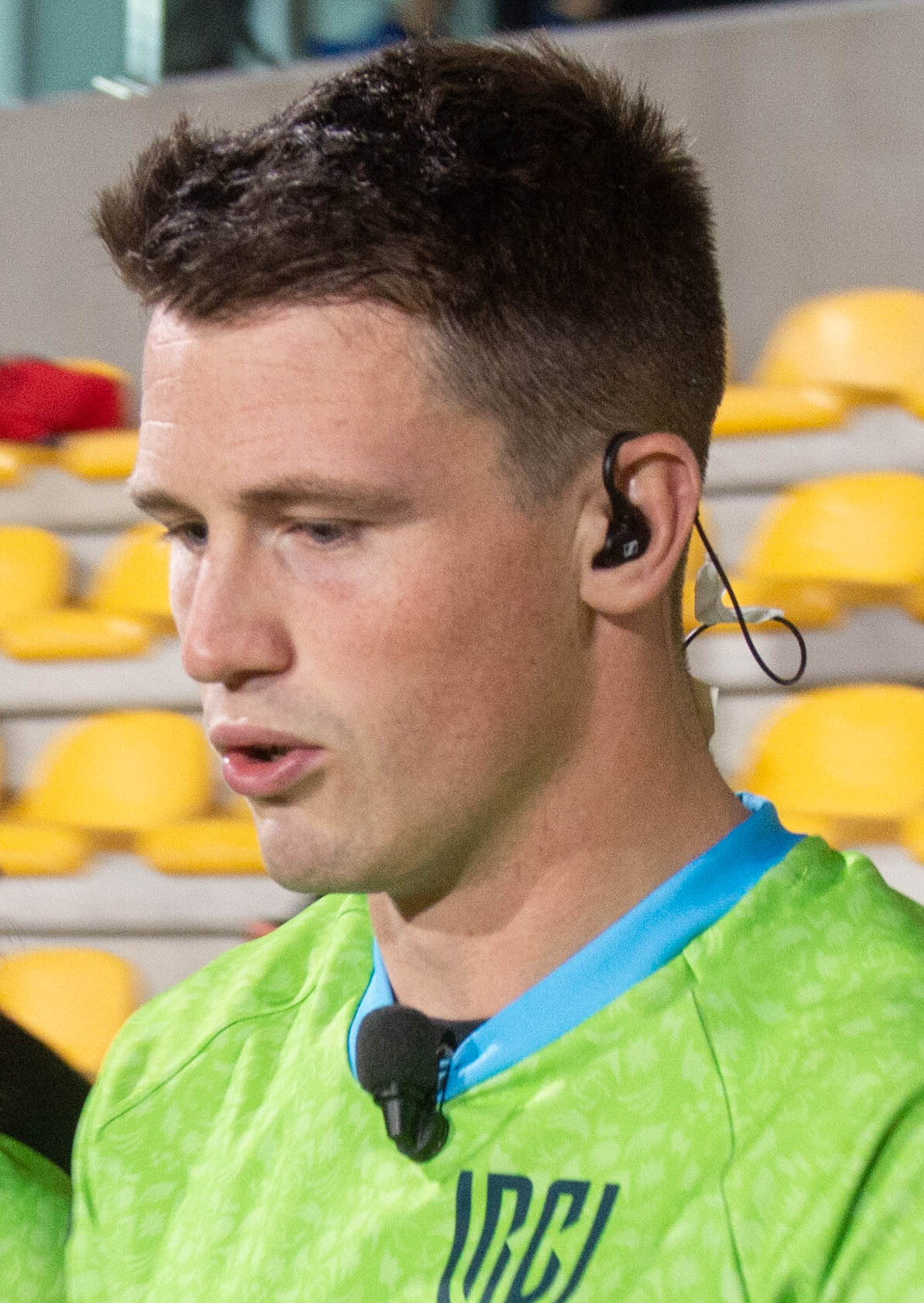
- Born: Sam Grove-White; 29 April 1992 (age 34) Aberdeen, Scotland
- University: Robert Gordon University
- Occupation: Rugby union referee

Rugby union career
- Position: Flanker
Amateur team(s)
Years	Team	Apps	(Points)
-	Montrose		
Refereeing career
Years	Competition		Apps
2014-present	Scottish Premiership		
2015	Japanese Top League		
2016-present	World Rugby Sevens Series		
2017-present	URC		
2018	Commonwealth Games		
2019-	Super 6		
2021	1872 Cup		

Sam Grove-White (born 29 April 1992) is a professional rugby union referee who represents the Scottish Rugby Union.

== Rugby playing career ==
Grove-White began playing rugby with Montrose minis and then Angus Colts. However, when he was at university, an injured ankle ended his playing career and he decided to start refereeing rugby union instead.

== Rugby referee career ==
=== Professional career ===
Grove-White has refereed in the Japanese Top League in 2015 as part of a Scottish Rugby Union initiative to create links with Scotland and Japan.

He has also refereed in the Scottish Premiership.

Grove-White now referees in the United Rugby Championship.

He refereed his first game in the Super 6 in a match between Stirling County and Ayrshire Bulls.

=== International career ===
He was picked as a referee for the World Rugby Sevens Series of 2016-17 season. This has continued through to the 2018-19 season.

Grove-White has refereed in the Under 20 Six Nations.

He has also refereed in the 2018 Commonwealth Games.

He refereed in the 2 January 2021 1st round 1872 Cup match.

== Outside of rugby ==
Grove-White has a degree in Business Management from Robert Gordon University.
