= Glen Young (rugby union) =

Scottish rugby player

- Full name: Glen John Young
- Born: 4 November 1994 (age 32) Jedburgh, Scotland
- Height: 2.01 m (6 ft 7 in)
- Weight: 119 kg (262 lb; 18 st 10 lb)
- School: Jedburgh Grammar School

Rugby union career
- Position: Lock
- Current team: Edinburgh
Senior career
Years	Team	Apps	(Points)
2014–2019	Newcastle Falcons	27	(5)
2015–2017	Doncaster Knights	41	(15)
2019–2021	Harlequins	32	(5)
2022–	Edinburgh	37	(35)
- Correct as of 29 May 2024
International career
Years	Team	Apps	(Points)
2014	Scotland U20	7	(0)
2022	Scotland 'A'	1	(0)
2022–	Scotland	4	(0)
- Correct as of 7 July 2024

Glen John Young (born 4 November 1994) is a Scottish professional rugby union player who plays as a lock for United Rugby Championship club Edinburgh and the Scotland national team.

== Club career ==
Young begun playing top level youth rugby, most notably as a part of Newcastle Falcons Under 18s team in the 2012–13 season during which he played many games as a member of the club's A Team. During the next season Young become a regular member A Team. Highlights included a try against Bath.

In 2013 and 2014 Young played for the Newcastle Falcons in the Premiership Rugby 7s. In 2015/16 he was dual-registered with the Falcons as well as the Doncaster Knights.

Young stood out in a Newcastle squad destined for relegation to the RFU Championship in 2019. Briefly without a club, Young signed a contract with Harlequins ahead of the 2019-2020 English Rugby Premiership season.

Young signed a pre-contract agreement with Pro14 side Edinburgh Rugby in January 2021, alongside fellow Harlequins player James Lang.

== International career ==
In 2014/15 Young made his first team debut as a lock, in the Scotland Under 20 team. Young achieved a total of seven caps at Under 20 level. In 2014 he travelled to New Zealand in Scotland's Junior World Championship squad.

In March 2022 he was called up to the senior Scotland squad for the 2022 Six Nations Championship. He received a full senior cap, coming on as a replacement in the third test match against Argentina on 16 July 2022.
