= Ben Vellacott =

Scottish rugby union player

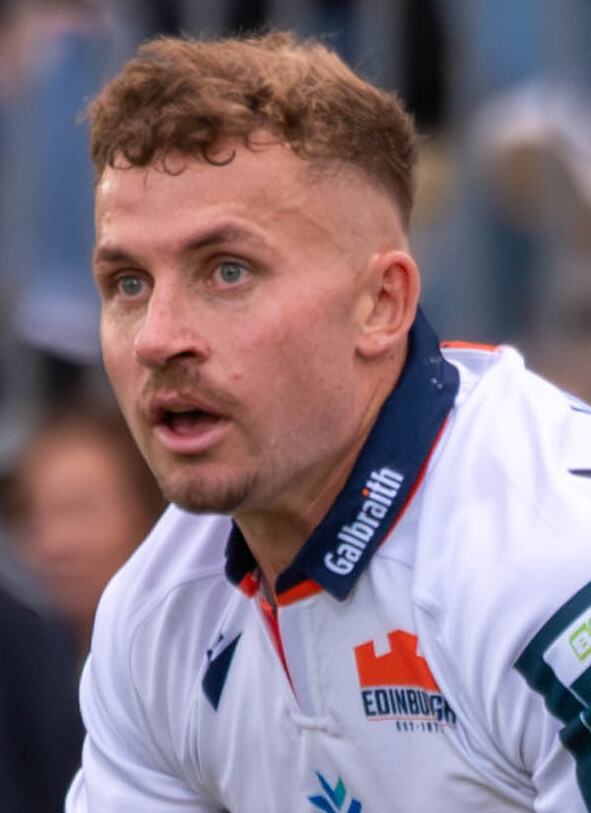
- Vellacott in 2025
- Born: Ben Vellacott; 28 March 1995 (age 31) Chertsey, Surrey, England
- Height: 1.68 m (5 ft 6 in)
- Weight: 78 kg (12 st 4 lb)
- School: Ivybridge Community College; West Buckland School; Hartpury College

Rugby union career
- Position: Scrum-half
- Current team: Edinburgh Rugby
Senior career
| Years | Team | Apps | (Points) |
| 2016–2019 | Gloucester Rugby | 49 | (70) |
| 2019–2021 | Wasps | 20 | (10) |
| 2021– | Edinburgh Rugby | 38 | (50) |
- Correct as of 5 April 2023
International career
| Years | Team | Apps | (Points) |
| 2014–2015 | Scotland U20s | 17 | (5) |
| 2022 | Scotland | 1 | (0) |
- Correct as of 13 April 2023

Ben Vellacott (born 28 March 1995) is a Scottish rugby union player who currently plays for Edinburgh Rugby in the United Rugby Championship.

== Rugby Union career ==
=== Professional career ===
Vellacott was a member of the Gloucester Academy before signing his first professional contract on 19 January 2017 with Gloucester at Kingsholm Stadium.

On 6 February 2019, Vellacott has signed for Premiership rivals Wasps from the 2019–20 season. Vellacott first pulled on Wasps colours at the 2019 Premiership 7s, helping his side reach the final of the tournament for a sixth successive time, but an unfortunate ACL injury ruled him out of action for six months of the season.

On 2 March 2021, Vellacott announced his move to Scotland to join URC side Edinburgh ahead of the 2021–22 season.

=== International career ===
Born in England, he is qualified to play for Scotland through his mother and has represented them at age group level.

Vellacott has played for Scotland at under-17 and under-18 levels - giving a man-of-the-match performance against England at the former age grade. He made his Scotland under-20 debut off the bench against Ireland U20s in January 2014 during the 2014 Six Nations Under 20s Championship and scored his side's only try, in the final minutes. Ben was named in the Scotland U20 squad for the Junior World Championships in Italy in June 2015.

In January 2022 Vellacott was named in the Scotland squad for the 2022 Six Nations Championship.

He made his debut for Scotland in their 33 - 22 victory over Italy at the Stadio Olimpico in Rome on 12 March 2022.
