= Adam Jones (referee) =

Welsh rugby union referee

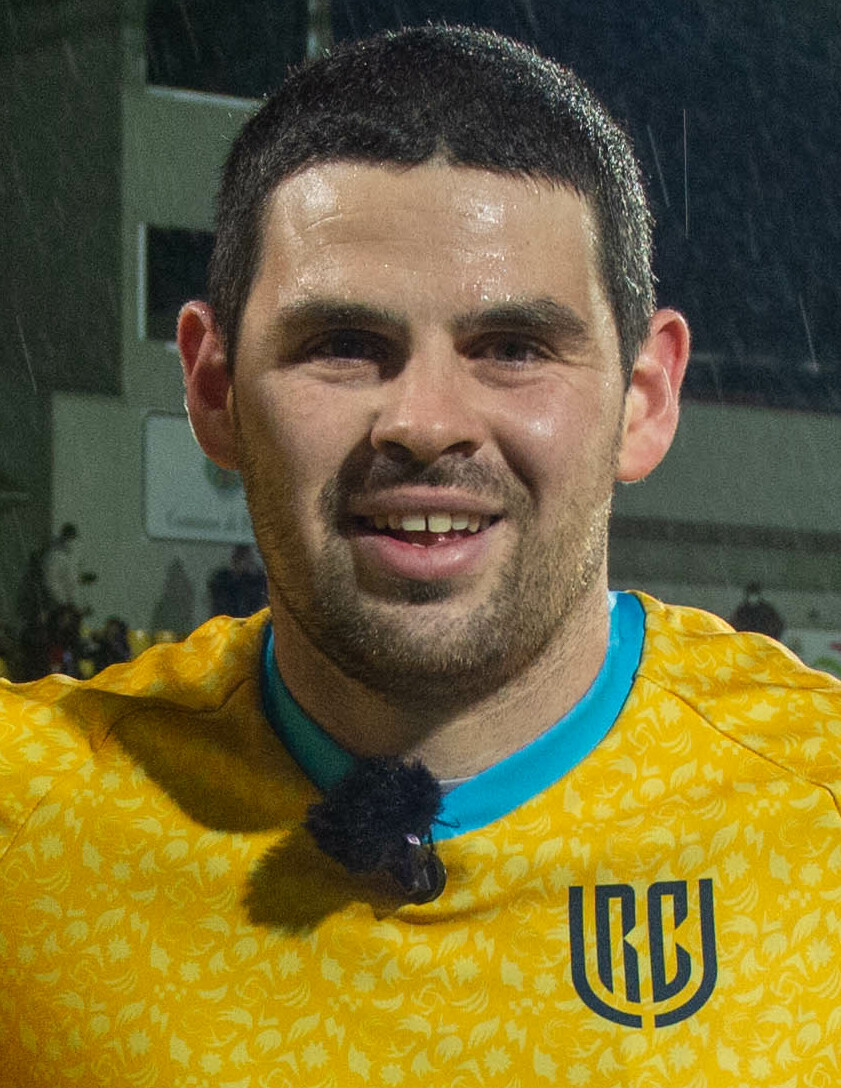
- Born: 3 November 1993 (age 33) Brecon, Mid Wales, Wales

Rugby union career
Refereeing career
Years	Competition	Apps
2020–	United Rugby Championship	50

Adam Jones (born 3 November 1993) in Brecon, Wales, is a Welsh rugby referee. He has been a member of Wales' professional rugby union ranks since 2020.

== Career ==
Jones, who began refereeing aged 16, began refereeing on the World Rugby Sevens Series in 2018. He refereed during the 2020 Olympics, before committing to the 15-aside game full time. He made his Pro14 refereeing debut in 2020, refereeing the fixture between the Ospreys and Dragons in August.

In September 2025 he was appointed the WRU's Match Official Community Lead.
