= Gianluca Gnecchi =

Italian rugby union referee (born 1992)

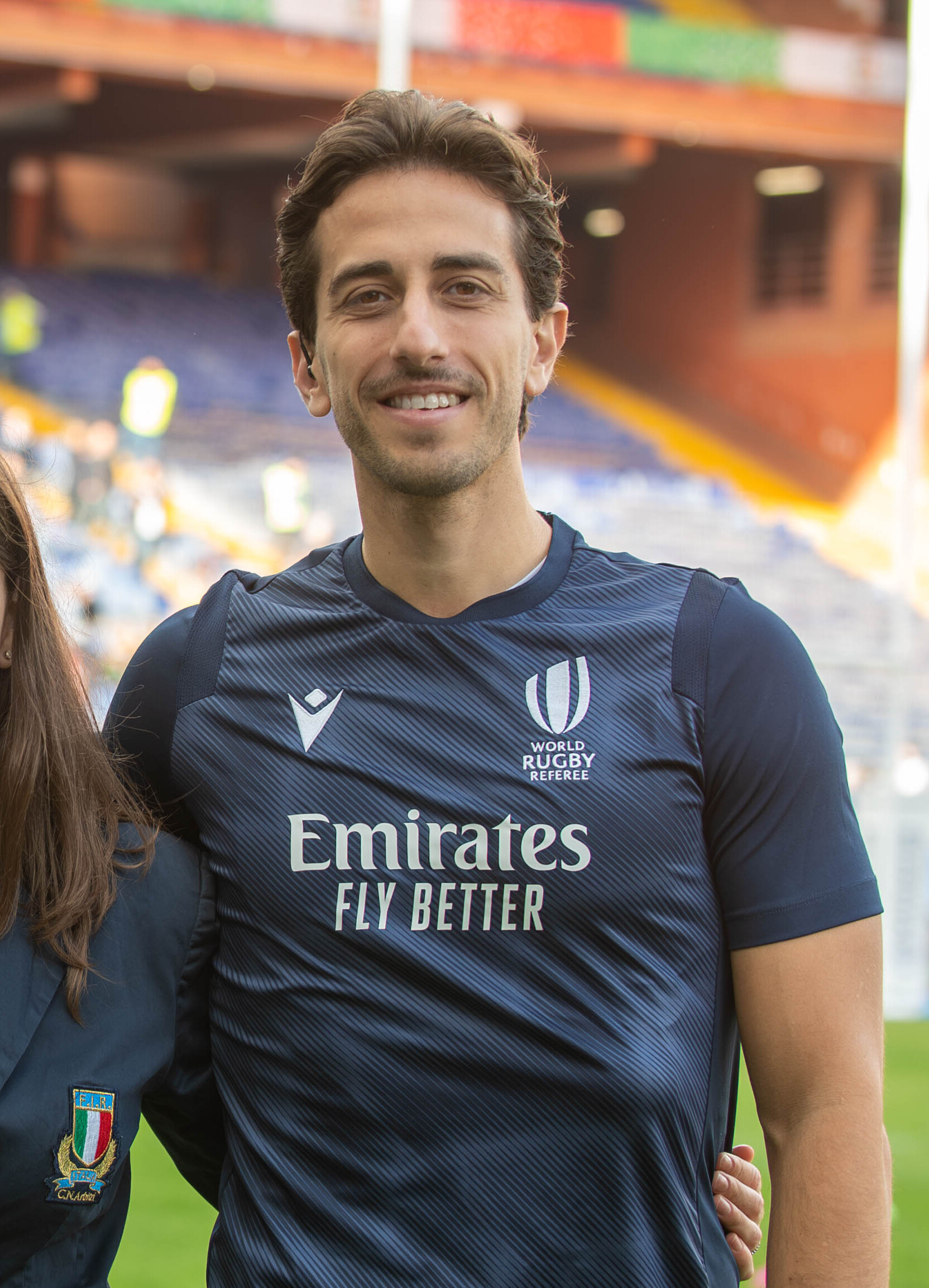
- Gianluca Gnecchi in 2024
- Born: 1992 (age 33–34) Brescia, Italy
- Height: 187 cm (6 ft 2 in)

Rugby union career
Refereeing career
Years	Competition	Apps
2020–	United Rugby Championship	11

Gianluca Gnecchi (born 1992 in Brescia) is an Italian rugby referee.

== Career ==
Gnecchi was born in Brescia Italy, and refereed in Italy and in the Six Nations Under 20s Championship before making his Pro14 refereeing debut in the match between Zebre and Benetton on 30 August 2020, where he was assisted by fellow Brescian referee Andrea Piardi. Gnecchi refereed the 2023 Rugby World Cup qualifiers in South America, refereeing the match between Brazil and Chile on 11 July 2021. Gnecchi drew criticism for a refereeing decision in a match between Glasgow Warriors and the Lions on 9 October 2021, where he awarded a try, despite the ball being grounded short of the line.
