= 2019–20 European Rugby Challenge Cup pool stage =

- Season: 2019–20 European Rugby Challenge Cup
- Date: 15 November 2019 – 18 January 2020

Qualifiers

The 2019–20 European Rugby Challenge Cup pool stage is the first stage of the competition in what is the sixth season of the European Rugby Challenge Cup. The competition involves twenty teams competing across five pools of four teams for eight quarter-final places – awarded to the five pool winners and the three top-ranked pool runners-up. The pool stage begins on 15 November 2019 and is due to be completed on 18 January 2019.

== Seeding ==
The 20 competing teams will be seeded and split into four tiers; seeding is based on performance in their respective domestic leagues. Where promotion and relegation is in effect in a league, the promoted team is seeded last, or (if multiple teams are promoted) by performance in the lower competition.

| Rank | Top 14 | Premiership | Pro 14 | Continental Shield |
|---|---|---|---|---|
| 1 | (France) Castres | (England) Wasps | (Wales) Scarlets | (Russia) Enisey-STM |
| 2 | (France) Stade Français | (England) Bristol Bears | (Wales) Cardiff Blues | (Italy) Calvisano |
| 3 | (France) Toulon | (England) Worcester Warriors | (Scotland) Edinburgh | |
| 4 | (France) Bordeaux Bègles | (England) Leicester Tigers | (Wales) Dragons | |
| 5 | (France) Pau | (England) London Irish | (Italy) Zebre | |
| 6 | (France) Agen | | | |
| 7 | (France) Bayonne | | | |
| 8 | (France) Brive | | | |

Based on these seedings, teams are placed into one of the four tiers, with the top-seeded clubs being put in Tier 1. The nature of the tier system means that a draw is needed to allocate two of the three second-seed clubs to Tier 1. The fourth-seed team from the same domestic league as the second-seed team which was put in Tier 2 will also be placed in Tier 2. Brackets show each team's seeding and their league. e.g. 1 Top 14 indicates the team was the top seed from the Top 14.

Given the nature of the Continental Shield, a competition including developing rugby nations and Italian clubs not competing in the Pro14, the qualifying teams from this competition are automatically included in Tier 4.

| Tier 1 | (England) Wasps (1 Prem) | (Wales) Scarlets (1 Pro14) | (France) Castres (1 Top 14) | (France) Stade Français (2 Top 14) | (Wales) Cardiff Blues (2 Pro14) |
| Tier 2 | (England) Bristol Bears (2 Prem) | (England) Worcester Warriors (3 Prem) | (Scotland) Edinburgh (3 Pro14) | (France) Toulon (3 Top 14) | (England) Leicester Tigers (4 Prem) |
| Tier 3 | (France) Bordeaux Bègles (4 Top 14) | (Wales) Dragons (4 Pro14) | (England) London Irish (5 Prem) | (Italy) Zebre (5 Pro14) | (France) Pau (5 Top 14) |
| Tier 4 | (France) Agen (6 Top 14) | (France) Bayonne (7 Top 14) | (France) Brive (8 Top 14) | (Russia) Enisey-STM (CS 1) | (Italy) Calvisano (CS 2) |

== Pool stage ==
The draw took place in June 2019.

Teams in the same pool will play each other twice, both at home and away in the group stage, that will begin in November 2019, and continue through to January 2020, before the pool winners and three best runners-up progressed to the quarter finals.

Teams will be awarded competition points, based on match result. Teams receive four points for a win, two points for a draw, one attacking bonus point for scoring four or more tries in a match and one defensive bonus point for losing a match by seven points or fewer.

In the event of a tie between two or more teams, the following tie-breakers will be used, as directed by EPCR:

1. Where teams have played each other
  1. The club with the greater number of competition points from only matches involving tied teams.
  2. If equal, the club with the best aggregate points difference from those matches.
  3. If equal, the club that scored the most tries in those matches.
2. Where teams remain tied and/or have not played each other in the competition (i.e. are from different pools)
  1. The club with the best aggregate points difference from the pool stage.
  2. If equal, the club that scored the most tries in the pool stage.
  3. If equal, the club with the fewest players suspended in the pool stage.
  4. If equal, the drawing of lots will determine a club's ranking.

Key to colours
| Winner of each pool, advance to quarter-finals. |
| Three highest-scoring second-place teams advance to quarter-finals. |

=== Pool 1 ===
| Pos | Team | Pld | W | D | L | PF | PA | PD | TF | TA | TB | LB | Pts |
|---|---|---|---|---|---|---|---|---|---|---|---|---|---|
| 1 | (France) Castres (5) | 6 | 5 | 0 | 1 | 159 | 103 | +56 | 22 | 12 | 3 | 0 | 23 |
| 2 | (Wales) Dragons (7) | 6 | 4 | 0 | 2 | 194 | 136 | +58 | 24 | 17 | 3 | 1 | 20 |
| 3 | (England) Worcester Warriors | 6 | 3 | 0 | 3 | 209 | 127 | +82 | 27 | 14 | 3 | 1 | 16 |
| 4 | (Russia) Enisey-STM | 6 | 0 | 0 | 6 | 73 | 269 | −196 | 10 | 40 | 0 | 0 | 0 |

==== Round 1 ====
15 November 2019
19:00

| Enisei-STM (Russia) | 14–57 | (England) Worcester Warriors (1 BP) |
| Try: Meskhi 63' c Krotov 75' c Con: Gaisin (1/1) 64'; Budychenko (1/1) 76' | Report | Try: Palframan 17' m David 21' c Shillcock (3) 31' c, 60' c, 69' c Kitto 35' c Morris 40'+2 m Clegg 55' m Simpson 78' c Con: Shillcock (6/9) 23', 32', 36', 60', 71', 79' |

Kuban Stadium, Krasnodar
Attendance: 400
Referee: Andrea Piardi (FIR)

16 November 2019
15:00

| (1 BP) Dragons (Wales) | 31–17 | (France) Castres |
| Try: Basham 6' c, 15' c, 34' c Howells 18' c Con: S. Davies (4/4) 7', 16', 19', 35'; Pen: S. Davies (1/1) 61' | Report | Try: Paris 25' c Radosavljevic 58' c Con: Radosavljevic (2/2) 25', 59'; Pen: Radosavljevic (1/1) 2' |

Rodney Parade
Attendance: 4,013
Referee: JP Doyle (RFU)

==== Round 2 ====
22 November 2019
18:00

| Enisei-STM (Russia) | 22–49 | (Wales) Dragons (1 BP) |
| Try: Basson 13' c Jordaan 24' c Meskhi 71' m Con: Gaisin (2/2) 14', 25'; Budychenko (0/1); Pen: Gaisin (1/1) 47' | Report | Try: J. Williams 9' c Robson 40'+2 c Fry 44' c Talbot-Davies 48' c Shipp 58' c Howells 62' c Morgan 76' c Con: Robson (7/7) 10', 40'+3, 45', 49', 59', 63', 77' |

Kuban Stadium, Krasnodar
Attendance: 200
Referee: Sam Grove-White (SRU)

23 November 2019
14:00

| Castres (France) | 17–9 | (England) Worcester Warriors |
| Try: Nakosi 12' c Delaporte 25' c Con: Urdapilleta (2/2) 13', 26'; Pen: Kockott (0/1); Urdapilleta (1/1) 72' | Report | Pen: Weir (3/3) 7', 32', 45' |

Stade Pierre-Fabre
Attendance: 8,277
Referee: Sean Gallagher (IRFU)

==== Round 3 ====
6 December 2019
19:00

| Enisei-STM (Russia) | 12–28 | (France) Castres |
| Try: Basson 9' c Khatiashvili 59' m Con: Budychenko (1/2) 10’ | Report | Try: Jenneker 2' c Gerondeau 42' c Caminati 72' m Con: Radosavljevic (2/3) 3', 44'; Pen: Radosavljevic (3/3) 20', 26', 40' |

Kuban Stadium, Krasnodar
Attendance: 100
Referee: Nika Amashukeli (GRU)

7 December 2019
15:00

| (1 BP) Worcester Warriors (England) | 34–28 | (Wales) Dragons (1 BP) |
| Try: Mills 23' c Lawrence 55' c Heward 64' c Kitto 72' c Con: Shillcock (4/4) 23', 56', 66', 73'; Pen: Shillcock (2/2) 6', 38' | Report | Try: Wainwright 13' c R. Williams 45' m Baldwin 76' c Con: S. Davies (2/3) 14', 76'; Pen: S. Davies (3/5) 32', 50', 58' |

Sixways Stadium
Attendance: 6,899
Referee: Marius Mitrea (FIR)

==== Round 4 ====
13 December 2019
18:00

| (1 BP) Castres (France) | 22–10 | (Russia) Enisei-STM |
| Try: Palis (2) 7' m, 62' m Tulou 32' m Fernandez 74' c Con: Dumora (1/4) 74' | Report | Try: Douwrie 25' c Con: Douwrie (1/1) 26'; Pen: Douwrie (1/1) 3' |

Stade Pierre-Fabre
Attendance: 7,957
Referee: Ian Tempest (RFU)

13 December 2019
20:00

| Dragons (Wales) | 25–16 | (England) Worcester Warriors |
| Try: Warren 2' c Con: S. Davies (1/1) 3'; Pen: S. Davies (6/6) 8', 15', 49', 58', 67', 74' | Report | Try: Howe 45' c Con: Weir (1/1) 46'; Pen: Weir (3/4) 20', 30', 40'+1 |

Rodney Parade
Attendance: 4,037
Referee: Ludovic Cayre (FFR)

==== Round 5 ====
11 January 2020
15:00

| (1 BP) Castres (France) | 42–14 | (Wales) Dragons |
| Try: Fortunel 6' c Jelonch 10' c Hounkpatin 22' c Combezou 43' c Dumora 50' c Firmin 71' c Con: Dumora (6/6) 7', 11', 23', 45', 52', 72' | Report | Try: Rosser (2) 64' c, 79' c Con: S. Davies (2/2) 65', 80' |

Stade Pierre-Fabre
Attendance: 8,273
Referee: JP Doyle (RFU)

11 January 2020
15:00

| (1 BP) Worcester Warriors (England) | 66–10 | (Russia) Enisei-STM |
| Try: Van Breda 7' c Lawrence (3) 20' c, 23' m, 30' c Mama 43' c Shillcock 50' c Miller 55' c Heward (2) 67' c, 77' c Butler 74' m Con: Shillcock (8/10) 8', 21', 31', 45', 51', 57', 68', 77' | Report | Try: Douwrie 10' c Con: Gaisin (1/1) 12'; Pen: Gaisin (1/1) 16' |

Sixways Stadium
Attendance: 6,287
Referee: Craig Evans (WRU)

==== Round 6 ====
17 January 2020
20:00

| (1 BP) Dragons (Wales) | 47–5 | (Russia) Enisei-STM |
| Try: Moriarty 10' c Rosser 29' c Keddie 41' c Morgan 56' c Warren (2) 70' c, 80' c Wainwright 74' m Con: S. Davies (6/7) 11', 30', 41', 57', 71', 80'+1 | Report | Try: Basson 32' m Con: Gaisin (0/1) |

Rodney Parade
Attendance: 4,038
Referee: Joy Neville (IRFU)

17 January 2020
20:00

| (1 BP) Worcester Warriors (England) | 27–33 | (France) Castres (1 BP) |
| Try: Shillcock 17' c Mama 31' c Heaney 44' c Con: Weir (3/3) 18', 33', 46'; Pen: Weir (1/1) 40'+1 | Report | Try: Kockott (3) 15' m, 53' c, 74' c Hounkpatin 36' c Delaporte 69' m Con: Kockott (3/5) 37', 53', 75'; Pen: Kockott (0/1) |

Sixways Stadium
Attendance: 6,938
Referee: Ben Blain (SRU)

=== Pool 2 ===
| Pos | Team | Pld | W | D | L | PF | PA | PD | TF | TA | TB | LB | Pts |
|---|---|---|---|---|---|---|---|---|---|---|---|---|---|
| 1 | (France) Toulon (1) | 6 | 6 | 0 | 0 | 177 | 87 | +90 | 25 | 8 | 4 | 0 | 28 |
| 2 | (Wales) Scarlets (8) | 6 | 4 | 0 | 2 | 149 | 90 | +59 | 17 | 11 | 2 | 1 | 19 |
| 3 | (France) Bayonne | 6 | 1 | 0 | 5 | 93 | 190 | −97 | 12 | 28 | 2 | 1 | 7 |
| 4 | (England) London Irish | 6 | 1 | 0 | 5 | 122 | 174 | −52 | 16 | 23 | 1 | 2 | 7 |

==== Round 1 ====
15 November 2019
20:45

| (1 BP) Bayonne (France) | 13–20 | (France) Toulon (1 BP) |
| Try: Muscarditz 46'; Con: Ordas (1/1) 47'; Pen: Ordas (2/3) 9', 28' | Report | Try: Van der Merwe (2) 36' m, 40'+1 m Savea 58' m Etrillard 74' m Con: Carbonel (0/2); Serin (0/2); Pen: Serin (0/1) |

Stade Jean Dauger
Attendance: 9,053
Referee: Craig Evans (WRU)

16 November 2019
20:00

| Scarlets (Wales) | 20–16 | (England) London Irish (1 BP) |
| Try: Baldwin 28' c Hughes 51' c Con: D. Jones (2/2) 30', 52'; Pen: D. Jones (2/2) 14', 40'+1 | Report | Try: Matu'u 19' c Con: Myler (1/1) 20'; Pen: Myler (3/4) 33', 38', 55' |

Parc y Scarlets
Attendance: 6,753
Referee: Sean Gallagher (IRFU)

==== Round 2 ====
22 November 2019
21:00

| Toulon (France) | 17–16 | (Wales) Scarlets (1 BP) |
| Try: Cordin 9' c Messam 80'+8 c Con: Belleau (2/2) 10', 80'+10; Pen: Belleau (1/3) 31' | Report | Try: McNicholl 14' c Con: Lamb (1/1) 15'; Pen: Lamb (1/1) 47'; D. Jones (1/1) 67'; Drop: D. Jones 69' (1/1) |

Stade Mayol
Attendance: 10,212
Referee: Tom Foley (IRFU)

23 November 2019
15:00

| (1 BP) London Irish (England) | 45–31 | (France) Bayonne (1 BP) |
| Try: Veitokani 13' m Jackson 25' c Tuisue 30' c Stephenson 35' c Hepetema 38' m Fainga'a 46' c Meehan 51' c Con: Jackson (5/7) 25', 31', 35', 47', 52' | Report | Try: Duhau (2) 5' c, 26' m Taufa 22' c Luamanu 32' m Maka 62' c Con: Fajardo (3/5) 6', 22', 62' |

Madejski Stadium
Attendance: 2,632
Referee: Joy Neville (IRFU)

==== Round 3 ====
7 December 2019
14:00

| (1 BP) Toulon (France) | 37–17 | (England) London Irish |
| Try: Serin (2) 1' c, 30' m Moyano (2) 54' m, 80' c Dakuwaqa 60' m Con: Belleau (3/5) 2', 61', 80'+2; Pen: Belleau (2/2) 18', 70' | Report | Try: Mafi 23' c Fowlie 76' c Con: Myler (2/2) 24', 77'; Pen: Myler (1/1) 38' |

Stade Mayol
Attendance: 15,336
Referee: Ben Whitehouse (WRU)

7 December 2019
21:00

| Bayonne (France) | 11–19 | (Wales) Scarlets |
| Try: Ruru 30' m Con: Barthelemy (0/1); Pen: Barthelemy (2/2) 23', 52' | Report | Try: R. Evans 28' c Con: Halfpenny (1/1) 29'; Pen: Halfpenny (4/4) 11', 40'+1, 50', 56' |

Stade Jean Dauger
Attendance: 7,456
Referee: Ben Blain (SRU)

==== Round 4 ====
14 December 2019
15:00

| (1 BP) London Irish (England) | 20–26 | (France) Toulon |
| Try: Tuisue 17' c Maddison 77' c Con: Jackson (2/2) 18', 77'; Pen: Jackson (2/2) 4', 42' | Report | Try: Dakuwaqa 38' c Serin 60' c Con: Belleau (1/1) 39'; Carbonel (1/1) 62'; Pen: Belleau (4/5) 9', 12', 22', 25' |

Madejski Stadium
Attendance: 3,007
Referee: Marius Mitrea (FIR)

14 December 2019
19:45

| (1 BP) Scarlets (Wales) | 46–5 | (France) Bayonne |
| Try: Conbeer 5' m Elias 47' c Hardy (2) 50' c, 68' c O'Brien 56' c Halfpenny 74' c Con: Halfpenny (5/6) 49', 51', 57', 69', 75'; Pen: Halfpenny (2/2) 16', 22' | Report | Try: Tisseron 79' m Con: Fajardo (0/1) |

Parc y Scarlets
Attendance: 6,257
Referee: Sam Grove-White (RFU)

==== Round 5 ====
11 January 2020
17:00

| (1 BP) Bayonne (France) | 27–10 | (England) London Irish |
| Try: Ordas 1' c Robinson 7' m Monribot 35' c Baget 71' m Con: Ordas (2/3) 2', 37'; Fajardo (0/1); Pen: Fajardo (1/1) 63' | Report | Try: Campbell 31' m Williams 47' m Con: Atkins (0/2) |

Stade Jean Dauger
Attendance: 5,057
Referee: Andrea Piardi (FIR)

11 January 2020
20:00

| Scarlets (Wales) | 15–27 | (France) Toulon (1 BP) |
| Try: G. Davies 0' m S. Evans 73' c Con: Halfpenny (1/2) 74'; Pen: Halfpenny (1/1) 10' | Report | Try: Etrillard 15' m Dakuwaqa 20' m Savea 23' c Soury 39' c Con: Belleau (2/4) 24', 40'; Pen: Belleau (1/1) 48' |

Parc y Scarlets
Attendance: 7,565
Referee: Craig Maxwell-Keys (RFU)

==== Round 6 ====
18 January 2020
20:00

| London Irish (England) | 14–33 | (Wales) Scarlets (1 BP) |
| Try: Tuisue (2) 18' c, 76' c Con: Myler (2/2) 19', 77' | Report | Try: Baldwin 21'; D. Jones 28'; Hardy 36'; Penalty Try 46'; S. Evans 57'; Con: Halfpenny (3/4) 22', 29', 37' |

Madejski Stadium
Attendance: 3,444
Referee: Ludovic Cayre (FFR)

18 January 2020
21:00

| (1 BP) Toulon (France) | 50–6 | (France) Bayonne |
| Try: Cordin 5' c Heem 18' c Ory 42' m Gigashvili (2) 47' m, 67' c Isa 58' c Devaux 64' m Villiere 73' c Con: Carbonel (5/8) 6', 19', 58', 68', 74' | Report | Pen: Saubusse (2/3) |

Stade Mayol
Attendance: 13,027
Referee: Sean Gallagher (IRFU)

=== Pool 3 ===
| Pos | Team | Pld | W | D | L | PF | PA | PD | TF | TA | TB | LB | Pts |
|---|---|---|---|---|---|---|---|---|---|---|---|---|---|
| 1 | (France) Bordeaux Bègles (3) | 6 | 5 | 1 | 0 | 221 | 72 | +149 | 28 | 6 | 4 | 0 | 26 |
| 2 | (Scotland) Edinburgh (6) | 6 | 4 | 1 | 1 | 140 | 85 | +55 | 16 | 9 | 3 | 0 | 21 |
| 3 | (England) Wasps | 6 | 2 | 0 | 4 | 141 | 145 | −4 | 18 | 16 | 2 | 1 | 11 |
| 4 | (France) Agen | 6 | 0 | 0 | 6 | 57 | 257 | −200 | 6 | 37 | 0 | 0 | 0 |

==== Round 1 ====
15 November 2019
20:00

| Agen (France) | 10–31 | (Scotland) Edinburgh (1 BP) |
| Try: Masilevu 55' c Con: Lagarde (1/1) 56'; Pen: Vincent (1/1) 12' | Report | Try: Taylor 15' c, 23' c Hoyland 26' c Fenton 80'+5 c Con: Hickey (4/4) 17', 24', 27', 80'+6; Pen: Hickey (1/1) 45' |

Stade Armandie
Attendance: 3,570
Referee: Joy Neville (IRFU

16 November 2019
21:00

| (1 BP) Bordeaux Bègles (France) | 40–30 | (England) Wasps |
| Try: Tamanivalu 38' c Lesgourgues 66' c Higginbotham 69' c Buros 78' c Con: Jalibert (4/4) 39', 67', 70', 79'; Pen: Jalibert (4/4) 1', 9', 24', 52' | Report | Try: Willis 42' c Cruse 57' c Robson 72' c Con: Searle (3/3) 43', 58', 73'; Pen: Searle (3/3) 13', 17', 46' |

Stade Chaban-Delmas
Attendance: 13,908
Referee: Ben Blain (SRU)

==== Round 2 ====
22 November 2019
19:35

| Edinburgh (Scotland) | 16–16 | (France) Bordeaux Bègles |
| Try: Kinghorn 34' c Con: Van der Walt (1/1) 36'; Pen: Van der Walt (3/4) 15', 27', 50' | Report | Try: Radradra 58' c Con: Jalibert (1/1) 59'; Pen: Jalibert (3/4) 29', 40', 78' |

Murrayfield Stadium
Attendance: 5,432
Referee: Christophe Ridley (RFU)

23 November 2019
15:00

| (1 BP) Wasps (England) | 32–14 | (France) Agen |
| Try: Johnson (2) 9' c, 49' c Taylor 41' m Fekitoa 63' c Con: Umaga (3/4) 10', 50', 64'; Pen: Umaga (2/2) 21', 33' | Report | Try: Tolot 5' c Correa 76' c Con: Verdu (2/2) 7', 77' |

Ricoh Arena
Attendance: 7,594
Referee: Nika Amashukeli (GRU)

==== Round 3 ====
6 December 2019
20:00

| Agen (France) | 3–73 | (France) Bordeaux Bègles (1 BP) |
| Pen: Lagarde (1/1) 6' | Report | Try: Paiva 2' c Jalibert 39' c Cros (3) 14' m, 58' c, 62' c Kaulashvili 23' c Tauleigne 32' c Tamanivalu 37' c Ducuing 41' m Buros 53'; Dubié 72' c Con: Jalibert (6/8) 3', 24', 33', 38', 40', 54'; Botica (3/3) 59', 63', 72' |

Stade Armandie
Attendance: 1,997
Referee: Ian Tempest (RFU)

6 December 2019
19:35

| (1 BP) Edinburgh (Scotland) | 31–20 | (England) Wasps |
| Try: Van Der Merwe (2) 25' c, 49' c Kinghorn 43' c Taylor 72' c Con: Hickey (4/4) 26', 44', 50', 73'; Pen: Hickey (1/1) 35' | Report | Try: Willis 54' c Carr 79' c Con: Sopoaga (1/1) 56'; Gopperth (1/1) 80'; Pen: Sopoaga (2/2) 16', 40' |

Murrayfield Stadium
Attendance: 6,387
Referee: George Clancy (IRFU)

==== Round 4 ====
14 December 2019
14:00

| (1 BP) Bordeaux Bègles (France) | 33–6 | (France) Agen |
| Try: Tamanivalu 17' c Cordero 22' c Maynadier 41' c Gorgadze 63' m Germain 73' c Con: Botica (3/3) 17', 23', 42'; Jalibert (1/2) 74' | Report | Pen: Berdeu (2/2) 13', 29' |

Stade Chaban-Delmas
Attendance: 12,233
Referee: Craig Maxwell-Keys (RFU)

14 December 2019
15:00

| (1 BP) Wasps (England) | 7–9 | (Scotland) Edinburgh |
| Try: Carr 34' c Con: Sopoaga (1/1) 34' | Report | Pen: Hickey (1/2) 19'; Van der Walt (2/2) 71', 78' |

Ricoh Arena
Attendance: 7,146
Referee: Mathieu Raynal (FFR)

==== Round 5 ====
11 January 2020
13:45

| (1 BP) Bordeaux Bègles (France) | 32–17 | (Scotland) Edinburgh |
| Try: Radradra 24' c Cordero 38' c Lesgourgues 57' c Kovekalou 71' m Con: Jalibert (3/4) 25', 39', 58'; Pen: Jalibert (2/2) 18', 62' | Report | Try: Van der Merwe 49' c Bennett 78' c Con: Van der Walt (1/1) 50'; Hickey (1/1) 79'; Pen: Van der Walt (1/1) 9' |

Stade Chaban-Delmas
Attendance: 17,553
Referee: Christophe Ridley (RFU)

11 January 2020
15:00

| Agen (France) | 24–52 | (England) Wasps (1 BP) |
| Try: Correa (2) 7' c, 12' c Lamoulie 78' c Con: Vincent (3/3) 7', 13', 80'; Pen: Vincent (1/1) 40' | Report | Try: Johnson 2' c Bassett 8' m Alo 19' c Cruse 36' c Gopperth (2) 49' c, 55' m Wolstenholme (2) 53' c, 58' c Con: Sopoaga (6/8) 3', 20', 37', 50', 53', 58' |

Stade Armandie
Attendance: 2,013
Referee: Sean Gallagher (IRFU)

==== Round 6 ====
18 January 2020
15:00

| Edinburgh (Scotland) | 36–0 | (France) Agen |
| Try: Graham (4) 26' c, 37' m, 40' c, 66' c Van der Merwe 76' c Con: Van der Walt (2/3) 27', 40'; Hickey (2/2) 68', 77'; Pen: Van der Walt (1/1) 2' | Report | Pen: Lagarde (0/1) |

Murrayfield Stadium
Attendance: 5,710
Referee: Craig Maxwell-Keys (RFU)

18 January 2020
15:00

| Wasps (England) | 0–27 | (France) Bordeaux Bègles |
| | Report | Try: Ducuing 18' c Seuteni 53' c Gorgadze 80'+1 c Con: Botica (2/2) 19', 54'; Meret (1/1) 80'+2; Pen: Botica (1/3) 70'; Meret (1/1) 74' |

Ricoh Arena
Attendance: 6,107
Referee: Marius Mitrea (FIR)

=== Pool 4 ===
| Pos | Team | Pld | W | D | L | PF | PA | PD | TF | TA | TB | LB | Pts |
|---|---|---|---|---|---|---|---|---|---|---|---|---|---|
| 1 | (England) Bristol Bears (2) | 6 | 5 | 1 | 0 | 209 | 58 | +151 | 27 | 6 | 4 | 0 | 26 |
| 2 | (France) Brive | 6 | 3 | 0 | 3 | 111 | 165 | −54 | 14 | 22 | 1 | 1 | 14 |
| 3 | (Italy) Zebre | 6 | 2 | 1 | 3 | 106 | 151 | −45 | 15 | 19 | 2 | 1 | 13 |
| 4 | (France) Stade Français | 6 | 1 | 0 | 5 | 104 | 156 | −52 | 11 | 20 | 1 | 3 | 8 |

==== Round 1 ====
15 November 2019
20:45

| Stade Français (France) | 11–27 | (France) Brive |
| Try: Etien 36' m Con: Segonds (0/1); Pen: Segonds (2/2) 16', 60' | Report | Try: Lobzhanidze 23' c Giorgadze 40' c Penalty try 73'; Con: Abzhandadze (2/2) 23', 40'+1; Pen: Abzhandadze (2/3) 14', 28' |

Stade Jean-Bouin
Attendance: 2,000
Referee: Christophe Ridley (RFU)

16 November 2019
15:00

| (1 BP) Bristol Bears (England) | 59–21 | (Italy) Zebre |
| Try: Capon 14' c Fricker 17' c O'Conor 22' c Lloyd 24' c D. Thomas 40' c Y. Thomas 44' c Powell 75' c Uren 80' c Con: Lloyd (7/7) 14', 18', 22', 25', 40'+1, 46', 76'; Sheedy (1/1) 80'+1; Pen: Lloyd (1/1) 31' | Report | Try: Bellini 6' c Tauyavuca 64' c Penalty try 72'; Con: Canna (2/2) 6', 64' |

Ashton Gate Stadium
Attendance: 10,511
Referee: Ludovic Cayre (FFR)

==== Round 2 ====
22 November 2019
20:00

| Brive (France) | 0–36 | (England) Bristol Bears (1 BP) |
| | Report | Try: Fricker 5' c Randall 15' c O'Conor 24’ c Capon 68' c Holmes 73' m Con: Sheedy (4/5) 6', 16', 25', 71' |

Stade Amédée-Domenech
Attendance: 4,533
Referee: Craig Evans (WRU)

23 November 2019
16:00

| (1 BP) Zebre (Italy) | 12–13 | (France) Stade Français |
| Try: Walker 17' m Penalty try 73'; Con: Canna (0/1) | Report | Try: Fickou 3' c Con: Sanchez (1/1) 3'; Pen: Sanchez (2/2) 29', 35' |

Stadio Sergio Lanfranchi
Attendance: 2,200
Referee: Craig Maxwell-Keys (RFU)

==== Round 3 ====
7 December 2019
15:00

| (1 BP) Bristol Bears (England) | 37–11 | (France) Stade Français |
| Try: Morahan 25' c Thacker 64' c Piutau 75' c Fricker 80' c Con: Madigan (2/2) 26', 65'; Lloyd (2/2) 76', 80'+2; Pen: Madigan (3/3) 24', 35', 45' | Report | Try: Etien 18' m Con: Segonds (0/2); Pen: Segonds (2/2) 39', 57' |

Ashton Gate Stadium
Attendance: 11,120
Referee: Daniel Jones (WRU)

7 December 2019
16:00

| (1 BP) Zebre (Italy) | 27–24 | (France) Brive (1 BP) |
| Try: Balekana 2' m Canna 22' c Licata 32' c Elliott 34' m Con: Canna (2/4) 24', 33'; Pen: Canna (0/2); Violi (1/1) 71’ | Report | Try: Buliruarua 67' c Da Ros 73' c Delarue 80' c Con: Abzhandadze (3/3) 68', 74', 80'+1; Pen: Abzhandadze (1/1) 11' |

Stadio Sergio Lanfranchi
Attendance: 2,000
Referee: Tom Foley (IRFU)

==== Round 4 ====
13 December 2019
20:00

| Brive (France) | 24–10 | (Italy) Zebre |
| Try: Lobzhanidze (2) 16' c, 42' c Acquier 71' c Con: Abzhandadze (3/3) 17', 43', 73'; Pen: Abzhandadze (1/1) 13' | Report | Try: Boni 77' c Con: Violi (1/1) 78'; Pen: Biondelli (1/1) 10' |

Stade Amédée-Domenech
Attendance: 1,800
Referee: Sean Gallagher (IRFU)

14 December 2019
21:00

| (1 BP) Stade Français (France) | 16–18 | (England) Bristol Bears |
| Try: Vuidarvuwalu 24' c Con: Sanchez (1/1) 25'; Pen: Sanchez (2/4) 32', 44'; Segonds (1/1) 58' | Report | Try: Capon 27' m Thacker 77' c Con: Sheedy (1/2) 78'; Pen: Sheedy (2/2) 21', 47' |

Stade Jean-Bouin
Attendance: 2,000
Referee: Andrea Piardi (FIR)

==== Round 5 ====
11 January 2020
15:00

| (1 BP) Stade Français (France) | 24–29 | (Italy) Zebre (1 BP) |
| Try: Naivalu (2) 41' c, 49' c Feuteu 72' c Con: Segonds (3/3) 41', 51', 73'; Pen: Segonds (1/3) 22' | Report | Try: Elliott 15' c Walker 31' c Bruno 64' m Biagi 77' c Con: Biondelli (2/2) 16', 32'; Palazzani (1/2) 79'; Pen: Biondelli (1/1) 21' |

Stade Jean-Bouin
Attendance: 2,000
Referee: Nika Amashukeli (GRU)

11 January 2020
15:00

| (1 BP) Bristol Bears (England) | 52–3 | (France) Brive |
| Try: O'Conor 11' c Attwood 40' c Leiua 47' c Bedlow 51' c Hamilton 56' c Capon 59' c Protheroe 62' c Con: Sheedy (7/7) 13', 40'+1, 47', 52', 57', 61', 64'; Pen: Sheedy (1/1) 10' | Report | Pen: Abzhandadze (1/1) 34' |

Ashton Gate Stadium
Attendance: 10,874
Referee: Ben Blain (SRU)

==== Round 6 ====
18 January 2020
15:00

| (1 BP) Brive (France) | 33–29 | (France) Stade Français (2 BP) |
| Try: Giorgadze (2) 15' c, 44' m Lebas 27' c Lobzhanidze 57' c Narisia 67' c Con: Hervé (2/3) 16', 28'; Abzhandadze (2/2) 57', 68' | Report | Try: Daguin (2) 8' c, 53' c Combrinck 22' m Lapegue 48' c Con: Segonds (3/4) 9', 49', 54'; Pen: Segonds (1/3) 6' |

Stade Amédée-Domenech
Attendance: 3,002
Referee: Christophe Ridley (RFU)

18 January 2020
15:00

| Zebre (Italy) | 7–7 | (England) Bristol Bears |
| Try: Tuivaiti 37'; Con: Canna (1/1) 38'; Pen: Canna (0/1) | Report | Try: Randall 80' c Con: Sheedy (1/1) 80'+1 |

Stadio Sergio Lanfranchi
Attendance: 1,900
Referee: Thomas Charabas (FFR)

=== Pool 5 ===
| Pos | Team | Pld | W | D | L | PF | PA | PD | TF | TA | TB | LB | Pts |
|---|---|---|---|---|---|---|---|---|---|---|---|---|---|
| 1 | (England) Leicester Tigers (4) | 6 | 5 | 0 | 1 | 181 | 95 | +86 | 23 | 10 | 2 | 1 | 23 |
| 2 | (France) Pau | 6 | 4 | 0 | 2 | 208 | 170 | +38 | 29 | 23 | 3 | 0 | 19 |
| 3 | (Wales) Cardiff Blues | 6 | 3 | 0 | 3 | 216 | 119 | +97 | 30 | 13 | 4 | 2 | 18 |
| 4 | (Italy) Calvisano | 6 | 0 | 0 | 6 | 68 | 289 | −221 | 7 | 43 | 0 | 1 | 1 |

==== Round 1 ====
16 November 2019
14:30

| Calvisano (Italy) | 16–38 | (Wales) Cardiff Blues (1 BP) |
| Try: De Santis 23' c Con: Pescetto (1/1) 24'; Pen: Pescetto (3/3) 15', 54', 64' | Report | Try: Morgan 5' c Davies 28' c Botham 68' c Lee-Lo 71' c Millard 79' c Con: Evans (5/5) 6', 29', 69', 72', 80' |

Stadio San Michele
Attendance: 2,000
Referee: Craig Maxwell-Keys (RFU)

16 November 2019
15:00

| (1 BP) Leicester Tigers (England) | 41–20 | (France) Pau |
| Try: Worth 13' c Holmes (4) 15' c, 30' c, 45' c, 72' c Con: Ford (4/4) 14', 16', 31', 47'; Reid (1/1) 74'; Pen: Ford (1/1) 6'; Reid (1/1) 70' | Report | Try: Daubagna 26' c Metz 66' c Con: Taylor (2/2) 27', 66'; Pen: Taylor (2/2) 10', 40' |

Welford Road Stadium
Attendance: 15,250
Referee: Nika Amashukeli (GRU)

==== Round 2 ====
22 November 2019
20:00

| (1 BP) Pau (France) | 61–10 | (Italy) Calvisano |
| Try: Pourailly 1' c Dumoulin 13' c Ramsay 35' c Lebail 38' c Malié 40'+1 c Fisiihoi 45' c Pinto 57' m Pesenti 61' c Brettes 66' c Con: Lebail (8/9) 2', 14', 36', 39', 40'+2, 46', 61', 67' | Report | Try: Izekor 70' c Con: Pescetto (1/1) 71'; Pen: Chiesa (1/1) 32' |

Stade du Hameau
Attendance: 4,267
Referee: Ben Blain (SRU)

23 November 2019
20:00

| (1 BP) Cardiff Blues (Wales) | 11–14 | (England) Leicester Tigers |
| Try: Summerhill 33' m Con: Evans (0/1); Pen: Evans (2/3) 4', 24' | Report | Try: Coghlan 30' m Con: Hardwick (0/1); Pen: Hardwick (3/4) 38', 59', 80'+ 1 |

Cardiff Arms Park
Attendance: 7,122
Referee: Pierre Brousset (FFR)

==== Round 3 ====
7 December 2019
15:00

| (1 BP) Leicester Tigers (England) | 59–7 | (Italy) Calvisano |
| Try: Tuilagi 3' c May (2) 5' m, 11' c Lewis 16' c Reffell 45' c Thompstone 54' m Kerr 66' c Reid 73' c Veainu 80' c Con: Ford (4/5) 4', 12', 17', 46'; Hardwick (3/4) 67', 73', 80' | Report | Try: Cittadini 38' c Con: Pescetto (1/1) 40' |

Welford Road Stadium
Attendance: 15,073
Referee: Craig Evans (WRU)

7 December 2019
20:00

| (1 BP) Cardiff Blues (Wales) | 54–22 | (France) Pau |
| Try: Adams (3) 12' c, 50' c, 77' m Evans (2) 27' c, 59' c Thomas 30' c Morgan 34' c Lane 68' c Con: Evans (6/6) 13', 28', 31', 35', 51', 60'; Tovey (1/2) 70' | Report | Try: Rey 22' c Nueno 53' m Marques 74' c Con: Taylor (1/1) 24'; Lebail (1/2) 74'; Pen: Taylor (1/1) 19' |

Cardiff Arms Park
Attendance: 4,668
Referee: Andrea Piardi (FIR

==== Round 4 ====
14 December 2019 (Note: Game originally scheduled for 13 December 2019 at 20:00 but switched to the next day due to heavy rain.)
13:00

| (1 BP) Pau (France) | 34–29 | (Wales) Cardiff Blues (2 BP) |
| Try: Boughanmi 10' c Moise 15' m Nueno 31' c Pourailly 39' m Pesenti 44' c Con: Taylor (3/5) 11', 32', 45'; Pen: Lebail (1/1) 75' | Report | Try: Lane (3) 3' c, 63' c, 67' c Amos 58' m Con: Evans (1/1) 4'; Tovey (2/3) 64', 68'; Pen: Tovey (1/1) 80'+1 |

Stade du Hameau
Attendance: 3,724
Referee: Tom Foley (IRFU)

14 December 2019
14:30

| (1 BP) Calvisano (Italy) | 13–20 | (England) Leicester Tigers |
| Try: Panceyra-Garrido 80'+1 c Con: Casilio (1/1) 80'+2; Pen: Pescetto (2/2) 14', 66' | Report | Try: Steward 1' m Forsyth 61' m Leatigaga 75' c Con: Hardwick (1/3) 75'; Pen: Hardwick (1/1) 36' |

Stadio San Michele
Attendance: 2,500
Referee: Thomas Charabas (FFR)

==== Round 5 ====
11 January 2020
14:00

| Calvisano (Italy) | 19–47 | (France) Pau (1 BP) |
| Try: Michelini 14' c Van Zyl 41' c Susio 80'+1 m Con: Pescetto (2/3) 15', 41' | Report | Try: Dumoulin 6' c Lebail 12' c Tugaye 25' c Pourailly 31' c Pinto 47' m Barrett 50' c Daubagna 74' c Con: Lebail (6/7) 7', 13', 26', 32', 51', 75' |

Stadio San Michele
Attendance: 950
Referee: Joy Neville (IRFU)

12 January 2020
15:15

| Leicester Tigers (England) | 30–20 | (Wales) Cardiff Blues |
| Try: Lewis 18' c Olowofela 43' c White 53' c Con: G. Ford (3/3) 19', 45', 54'; Drop: G. Ford (2/2) 63', 71' | Report | Try: Adams 6' c Thomas 33' c Con: Tovey (2/2) 8', 34'; Pen: Tovey (2/2) 50', 69' |

Welford Road Stadium
Attendance: 16,538
Referee: George Clancy (IRFU)

==== Round 6 ====
18 January 2020
13:00

| (1 BP) Cardiff Blues (Wales) | 64–3 | (Italy) Calvisano |
| Try: Jones (3) 2' c, 10' c, 75' m E. Lewis 17' c Summerhill 20' c Robinson 29' c Lewis-Hughes 41' c L. Williams (2) 46' m, 79' c Boyde 73' ms Con: Tovey (6/7) 2', 11', 18', 21', 29', 42'; B. Thomas (1/3) 79' | Report | Pen: Casilio (1/1) 5' |

Cardiff Arms Park
Attendance: 5,822
Referee: Nika Amashukeli (GRU)

18 January 2020
14:00

| Pau (France) | 24–17 | (England) Leicester Tigers (1 BP) |
| Try: Pinto (2) 3' c, 5' c Leffler 39' c Con: Hastoy (3/3) 4', 6', 39'; Pen: Hastoy (1/1) 31' | Report | Try: Reid 15' c White 62' c Con: Hardwick (2/2) 16', 63'; Pen: Hardwick (1/1) 79' |

Stade du Hameau
Attendance: 6,124
Referee: Ben Whitehouse (WRU)

== See also ==
- 2019–20 European Rugby Champions Cup
