= 2019–20 European Rugby Challenge Cup =

Second-tier rugby union competition

Tournament details
- Countries: England; France; Italy; Russia; Scotland; Wales
- Tournament format(s): Round-robin and Knockout
- Date: 15 November 2019 - 16 October 2020

Tournament statistics
- Teams: 20
- Matches played: 60
- Attendance: 374,846 (6,247 per match)
- Highest attendance: 17,553 - Bordeaux Bègles v Edinburgh (11 January 2020)
- Lowest attendance: 100 - Enisey-STM v Castres (6 December 2019)
- Tries scored: 376 (6.27 per match)
- Top point scorer(s): (England) Jamie Shillcock (Worcester Warriors); 67 points
- Top try scorer(s): (England) Jamie Shillcock (Worcester Warriors); 5 tries

Final
- Venue: Stade Maurice David
- Champions: (England) Bristol Bears (1st title)
- Runners-up: (France) Toulon

The 2019–20 European Rugby Challenge Cup was the sixth edition of the European Rugby Challenge Cup, an annual second-tier rugby union competition for professional clubs. Including the predecessor competition, the original European Challenge Cup, this was the 24th edition of European club rugby's second-tier competition. Clubs from six European nations competed, including Russian and Italian clubs who qualified via the Continental Shield.

The tournament began in November 2019. The knock-out stages, originally planned to take place between March and May 2020, were delayed until later in the year due to the COVID-19 pandemic in Europe. The final took place on 16 October at the Stade Maurice David in Aix-en-Provence.

== Teams ==
20 teams will qualify for the 2019–20 European Challenge Cup; 18 will qualify from Premiership Rugby, the Pro14 and the Top 14, as a direct result of their domestic league performance, with two qualifying through the 2018–19 Continental Shield. The distribution of teams is:

- England: Five teams
  - Any teams finishing between 7th and 11th position in Premiership Rugby that do not qualify for the Champions Cup (Sale Sharks (7th) qualified for the Champions Cup and therefore did not take part in the Challenge Cup)).
  - The champion of the RFU Championship.
- France: Eight teams
  - Any teams finishing between 7th and 12th position in the Top 14 that do not qualify for the 2019-20 European Champions Cup
  - The champion from the Pro D2.
  - The winner of the promotion-relegation play-off between the team in 13th position in the Top 14 and the runner-up of the Pro D2.
- Italy, Scotland, Wales: six teams
  - Five teams from the Pro14, excluding the South African teams, that do not qualify for the 2019-20 European Champions Cup
  - One team from Italy qualified through the Continental Shield
- Russia: one team
  - One team from Russia qualified through the Continental Shield

No team from Ireland will participate in the competition as all four clubs have qualified for the 2019-20 European Champions Cup.

The following clubs have qualified for the Challenge Cup.

Premiership	Top 14	Pro14			Qualifying Competition	
England	France	Italy	Scotland	Wales	Italy	Russia
Bristol Bears; Leicester Tigers; London Irish; Wasps; Worcester Warriors	Agen; Bayonne; Bordeaux Bègles; Brive; Castres; Pau; Stade Français; Toulon	Zebre	Edinburgh	Cardiff Blues; Dragons; Scarlets	Calvisano	Enisey-STM

=== Qualifying competition ===
Six teams were split into two pools of three to compete in the pool stage of the European Rugby Continental Shield. Each team played the other two teams in its pool twice on a home-and-away basis. The winner of each pool faced each other in a two-legged play-off for a place in the Challenge Cup.

A further place was awarded to the winner of a two-legged playoff between the two sides competing in the 2018–19 Challenge Cup.

==== Qualifying play-offs ====
30 March 2019

Calvisano (Italy)	29 – 13	(Italy) Rugby Rovigo Delta

Stadio San Michele, Calvisano
Attendance: 1,200

30 March 2019

Timișoara Saracens (Romania)	20 – 18	(Russia) Enisey-STM

Dan Păltinișanu Stadium, Timișoara
Attendance: 970

20 April 2019

Enisey-STM (Russia)	40 – 32	(Romania) Timișoara Saracens

Avangard Stadium, Krasnoyarsk
Attendance: 2,600

20 April 2019

Rugby Rovigo Delta (Italy)	30 – 28	(Italy) Calvisano

Stadio Mario Battaglini, Rovigo

=== Team details ===
Below is the list of coaches, captain and stadiums with their method of qualification for each team.

Note: Placing shown in brackets, denotes standing at the end of the regular season for their respective leagues, with their end of season positioning shown through CH for Champions, RU for Runner-up, SF for losing Semi-finalist and QF for losing Quarter-finalist.

Team	Coach / Director of Rugby	Captain	Stadium	Capacity	Method of Qualification
(France) Agen	(France) Christophe Laussucq		Stade Armandie	14,000	Top 14 7th-12th (12th)
(France) Bayonne	(France) Yannick Bru	(France) Antoine Battut	Stade Jean Dauger	16,934	Pro D2 champions
(France) Bordeaux Bègles	(France) Christophe Urios	(France) Jefferson Poirot	Stade Chaban-Delmas	34,694	Top 14 7th-12th (10th)
(England) Bristol Bears	(Samoa) Pat Lam	(New Zealand) Steven Luatua	Ashton Gate	27,000	Premiership 8th-11th (9th)
(France) Brive	(Ireland) Jeremy Davidson	(Algeria) Saïd Hireche	Stade Amédée-Domenech	16,000	Pro D2 / Top 14 play-off winner
(Italy) Calvisano	(Italy) Massimo Brunello	(Italy) Alberto Chiesa	Stadio San Michele	5,000	European Rugby Continental Shield play-off winner
(Wales) Cardiff Blues	(Australia) John Mulvihill	(Wales) Ellis Jenkins	Cardiff Arms Park	12,125	Pro14 Conference A (5th)
(France) Castres	(Argentina) Mauricio Reggiardo	(France) Mathieu Babillot	Stade Pierre-Fabre	12,500	Top 14 7th-12th (7th)
(Wales) Dragons	(England) Dean Ryan	(Wales) Cory Hill	Rodney Parade	8,700	Pro14 Conference B (6th)
(Scotland) Edinburgh	(England) Richard Cockerill	(Scotland) Stuart McInally	Murrayfield Stadium	67,144	Pro14 Conference B (5th)
(Russia) Enisei-STM	(Russia) Alexander Pervukhin	(Latvia) Uldis Saulite	Kuban Stadium	35,200 (Note: Enisei-STM will play all their home games in Krasnodar - almost 3,000 miles west of their home town of Krasnoyarsk - due to the harshness of the Siberian winter.)	European Rugby Continental Shield play-off winner
(England) Leicester Tigers	(Ireland) Geordan Murphy	(England) Tom Youngs	Welford Road Stadium	25,849	Premiership 8th-11th (11th)
(England) London Irish	(Ireland) Declan Kidney	(Scotland) Blair Cowan	Madejski Stadium	24,161	RFU Championship champions
(France) Pau	(France) Nicolas Godignon (France) Frédéric Manca	(France) Quentin Lespiaucq	Stade du Hameau	18,324	Top 14 7th-12th (11th)
(Wales) Scarlets	(New Zealand) Brad Mooar	(Wales) Ken Owens	Parc y Scarlets	14,870	Pro14 Conference B (4th) (Note: Scarlets lost the 7th-place play-off to Ospreys, missing out on qualification for the European Rugby Champions Cup.)
(France) Stade Français	(South Africa) Heyneke Meyer (for (France) Laurent Sempéré and (France) Julien Arias) (Note: Heyneke Meyer began the tournament as Stade Français head coach, but resigned on November 12.)	(France) Yoann Maestri	Stade Jean-Bouin	20,000	Top 14 7th-12th
(France) Toulon	(France) Patrice Collazo	(France) Raphaël Lakafia	Stade Mayol	18,200	Top 14 7th-12th (9th)
(England) Wasps	(England) Lee Blackett	(England) Dan Robson (Wales) Thomas Young	Ricoh Arena	32,609	Premiership 8th-11th (8th)
(England) Worcester Warriors	(South Africa) Alan Solomons	(South Africa) GJ van Velze	Sixways Stadium	11,499	Premiership 8th-11th (10th)
(Italy) Zebre	(Ireland) Michael Bradley	(Italy) Tommaso Castello	Stadio Sergio Lanfranchi	5,000	Pro14 Conference A (7th)

== Seeding ==
The 20 competing teams will be seeded and split into four tiers; seeding is based on performance in their respective domestic leagues. Where promotion and relegation is in effect in a league, the promoted team is seeded last, or (if multiple teams are promoted) by performance in the lower competition.

Rank	Top 14	Premiership	Pro 14	Continental Shield
1	(France) Castres	(England) Wasps	(Wales) Scarlets	(Russia) Enisey-STM
2	(France) Stade Français	(England) Bristol Bears	(Wales) Cardiff Blues	(Italy) Calvisano
3	(France) Toulon	(England) Worcester Warriors	(Scotland) Edinburgh	
4	(France) Bordeaux Bègles	(England) Leicester Tigers	(Wales) Dragons	
5	(France) Pau	(England) London Irish	(Italy) Zebre	
6	(France) Agen			
7	(France) Bayonne			
8	(France) Brive			

Based on these seedings, teams are placed into one of the four tiers, with the top-seeded clubs being put in Tier 1. The nature of the tier system means that a draw is needed to allocate two of the three second-seed clubs to Tier 1. The fourth-seed team from the same domestic league as the second-seed team which was put in Tier 2 will also be placed in Tier 2. Brackets show each team's seeding and their league. e.g. 1 Top 14 indicates the team was the top seed from the Top 14.

Given the nature of the Continental Shield, a competition including developing rugby nations and Italian clubs not competing in the Pro14, the qualifying teams from this competition are automatically included in Tier 4.

Tier 1	(England) Wasps (1 Prem)	(Wales) Scarlets (1 Pro14)	(France) Castres (1 Top 14)	(France) Stade Français (2 Top 14)	(Wales) Cardiff Blues (2 Pro14)
Tier 2	(England) Bristol Bears (2 Prem)	(England) Worcester Warriors (3 Prem)	(Scotland) Edinburgh (3 Pro14)	(France) Toulon (3 Top 14)	(England) Leicester Tigers (4 Prem)
Tier 3	(France) Bordeaux Bègles (4 Top 14)	(Wales) Dragons (4 Pro14)	(England) London Irish (5 Prem)	(Italy) Zebre (5 Pro14)	(France) Pau (5 Top 14)
Tier 4	(France) Agen (6 Top 14)	(France) Bayonne (7 Top 14)	(France) Brive (8 Top 14)	(Russia) Enisey-STM (CS 1)	(Italy) Calvisano (CS 2)

== Pool stage ==
Locations
Locations of teams of the 2019–20 European Rugby Champions Cup group stage.
Green: Pool 1; Red: Pool 2; Orange: Pool 3; Yellow: Pool 4; Blue: Pool 5.

The draw took place in June 2019.

Teams in the same pool will play each other twice, both at home and away in the group stage, that will begin in November 2019, and continue through to January 2020, before the pool winners and three best runners-up progressed to the quarter-finals.

Teams will be awarded competition points, based on match result. Teams receive four points for a win, two points for a draw, one attacking bonus point for scoring four or more tries in a match and one defensive bonus point for losing a match by seven points or fewer.

In the event of a tie between two or more teams, the following tie-breakers will be used, as directed by EPCR:

1. Where teams have played each other
  1. The club with the greater number of competition points from only matches involving tied teams.
  2. If equal, the club with the best aggregate points difference from those matches.
  3. If equal, the club that scored the most tries in those matches.
2. Where teams remain tied and/or have not played each other in the competition (i.e. are from different pools)
  1. The club with the best aggregate points difference from the pool stage.
  2. If equal, the club that scored the most tries in the pool stage.
  3. If equal, the club with the fewest players suspended in the pool stage.
  4. If equal, the drawing of lots will determine a club's ranking.

Key to colours
Winner of each pool, advance to quarter-finals.
Three highest-scoring second-place teams advance to quarter-finals.

=== Pool 1 ===
Pos	Team	Pld	W	D	L	PF	PA	PD	TF	TA	TB	LB	Pts
1	(France) Castres (5)	6	5	0	1	159	103	+56	22	12	3	0	23
2	(Wales) Dragons (7)	6	4	0	2	194	136	+58	24	17	3	1	20
3	(England) Worcester Warriors	6	3	0	3	209	127	+82	27	14	3	1	16
4	(Russia) Enisey-STM	6	0	0	6	73	269	−196	10	40	0	0	0

=== Pool 2 ===
Pos	Team	Pld	W	D	L	PF	PA	PD	TF	TA	TB	LB	Pts
1	(France) Toulon (1)	6	6	0	0	177	87	+90	25	8	4	0	28
2	(Wales) Scarlets (8)	6	4	0	2	149	90	+59	17	11	2	1	19
3	(France) Bayonne	6	1	0	5	93	190	−97	12	28	2	1	7
4	(England) London Irish	6	1	0	5	122	174	−52	16	23	1	2	7

=== Pool 3 ===
Pos	Team	Pld	W	D	L	PF	PA	PD	TF	TA	TB	LB	Pts
1	(France) Bordeaux Bègles (3)	6	5	1	0	221	72	+149	28	6	4	0	26
2	(Scotland) Edinburgh (6)	6	4	1	1	140	85	+55	16	9	3	0	21
3	(England) Wasps	6	2	0	4	141	145	−4	18	16	2	1	11
4	(France) Agen	6	0	0	6	57	257	−200	6	37	0	0	0

=== Pool 4 ===
Pos	Team	Pld	W	D	L	PF	PA	PD	TF	TA	TB	LB	Pts
1	(England) Bristol Bears (2)	6	5	1	0	209	58	+151	27	6	4	0	26
2	(France) Brive	6	3	0	3	111	165	−54	14	22	1	1	14
3	(Italy) Zebre	6	2	1	3	106	151	−45	15	19	2	1	13
4	(France) Stade Français	6	1	0	5	104	156	−52	11	20	1	3	8

=== Pool 5 ===
Pos	Team	Pld	W	D	L	PF	PA	PD	TF	TA	TB	LB	Pts
1	(England) Leicester Tigers (4)	6	5	0	1	181	95	+86	23	10	2	1	23
2	(France) Pau	6	4	0	2	208	170	+38	29	23	3	0	19
3	(Wales) Cardiff Blues	6	3	0	3	216	119	+97	30	13	4	2	18
4	(Italy) Calvisano	6	0	0	6	68	289	−221	7	43	0	1	1

=== Ranking of pool leaders and runners-up ===
Rank	Pool Leaders	Pts	Diff	TF
1	(France) Toulon	28	+90	25
2	(England) Bristol Bears	26	+151	27
3	(France) Bordeaux Bègles	26	+149	28
4	(England) Leicester Tigers	23	+86	23
5	(France) Castres	23	+56	22
Rank	Pool Runners–up	Pts	Diff	TF
6	(Scotland) Edinburgh	21	+55	16
7	(Wales) Dragons	20	+58	24
8	(Wales) Scarlets	19	+59	17
9	(France) Pau	19	+38	29
10	(France) Brive	14	–54	14

== Knock-out stage ==
=== Bracket ===
Quarter-finals
1	(France) Toulon	11
8	(Wales) Scarlets	6
4	(England) Leicester Tigers	Bye
5	(France) Castres
2	(England) Bristol Bears	56
7	(Wales) Dragons	17
3	(France) Bordeaux Bègles	23
6	(Scotland) Edinburgh	14

Semi-finals
(France) Toulon	34
(England) Leicester Tigers	19
(England) Bristol Bears (a.e.t.)	37
(France) Bordeaux Bègles	20

Final
(France) Toulon	19
(England) Bristol Bears	32

=== Quarter-finals ===
18 September
19:45

Bristol Bears (England) (2)	56–17	(7) (Wales) Dragons
Try: Hughes 20' c Earl (2) 24' c, 26' c Radradra 43' c Vui 74' c Malins 75' c D. Thomas 77' c Con: Sheedy (6/7) 21', 25', 26', 44', 74', 76'; Pen: Sheedy (3/4) 31', 54', 70'	Report	Try: Hewitt 13' c R. Williams 51' c Con: S. Davies (2/2) 14', 51'; Pen: S. Davies (1/1) 11'

Ashton Gate
Referee: Mathieu Raynal (FFR)

19 September
13:30

Bordeaux Bègles (France) (3)	23–14	(6) (Scotland) Edinburgh
Try: Cordero 4' c Dubié 9' c Con: Jalibert (2/2) 5', 10'; Pen: Jalibert (2/3) 50', 58'; Botica (1/1) 80'+1	Report	Try: Hoyland 53' m Pen: van der Walt (2/3) 32', 46'; Kinghorn (1/1) 71'

Stade Chaban-Delmas
Referee: Frank Murphy (IRFU)

19 September
21:15

Toulon (France) (1)	11–6	(8) (Wales) Scarlets
Try: Parisse 56' m Pen: Carbonel (2/2) 54', 73'	Report	Pen: Halfpenny (2/3) 3', 30'

Stade Mayol
Referee: Andrew Brace (IRFU)

20 September
15:00

Leicester Tigers (England) (4)	Cancelled (Note: Due to three Castres players and one staff member testing positive for COVID-19, the match was cancelled and Castres forfeited.)	(5) (France) Castres

Welford Road
Referee: Mike Adamson (SRU)

=== Semi-finals ===
25 September
19:45

Bristol Bears (England) (2)	37–20 (a.e.t.)	(3) (France) Bordeaux Bègles
Try: Luatua 38' c Malins (2) 51' c, 86' c O'Conor 82' c Con: Sheedy (4/4) 39', 52', 83', 88'; Pen: Sheedy (3/4) 58', 62', 97'	Report	Try: Jalibert 11' c Dweba 67' c Con: Lucu (1/1) 13'; Botica (1/1) 68'; Pen: Jalibert (2/2) 27', 30'

Ashton Gate
Referee: Frank Murphy (IRFU)

26 September
21:00

Toulon (France) (1)	34–19	(4) (England) Leicester Tigers
Try: Heem 8' c Villière (2) 20' c, 66' c Isa 58' c Con: Carbonel (4/4) 10', 22', 60', 67'; Pen: Carbonel (2/2) 18', 34'	Report	Try: Nadolo 37' m Potter 74' m Pen: Ford (3/3) 3', 25', 45'

Stade Mayol
Referee: Mike Adamson (SRU)

=== Final ===
16 October 2020
21:00

Toulon (France) (1)	19–32	(2) (England) Bristol Bears
Try: Heem 11' c Con: Carbonel (1/1) 13'; Pen: Carbonel (4/5) 21', 37', 40', 53'	Report	Try: Randall 1' c Malins 60' c Con: Sheedy (2/2) 2', 61'; Pen: Sheedy (6/6) 4', 48', 56', 59', 75', 79'

Stade Maurice David, Aix-en-Provence
Attendance: 1,000
Referee: Andrew Brace (Ireland)

FB	15	(France) Gervais Cordin
RW	14	(New Zealand) Bryce Heem	(substituted off) 32'
OC	13	(New Zealand) Isaia Toeava
IC	12	(Australia) Duncan Paia'aua
LW	11	(France) Gabin Villière
FH	10	(France) Louis Carbonel
SH	9	(France) Baptiste Serin	(substituted off) 45'
N8	8	(Italy) Sergio Parisse
OF	7	(France) Raphaël Lakafia	(substituted off) 60'
BF	6	(France) Charles Ollivon
RL	5	(France) Romain Taofifénua	(substituted off) 52'
LL	4	(South Africa) Eben Etzebeth	(substituted off) 47'
TP	3	(Georgia (country)) Beka Gigashvili	(substituted off) 58'	(substituted on) 77'
HK	2	(France) Anthony Étrillard (c)	(substituted off) 55'
LP	1	(France) Jean-Baptiste Gros	(substituted off) 55'
Substitutions:
HK	16	(France) Bastien Soury	(substituted on) 55'
PR	17	(France) Florian Fresia	(substituted on) 55'
PR	18	(France) Emerick Setiano	(substituted on) 58'	(substituted off) 77'
LK	19	(Samoa) Brian Alainu'uese	(substituted on) 52'
FL	20	(France) Swan Rebbadj	(substituted on) 47'
SH	21	(France) Julien Ory	(substituted on) 60'
FH	22	(Tonga) Sonatane Takulua
WG	23	(Fiji) Masivesi Dakuwaqa	(substituted on) 32'
Coach:
(France) Patrice Collazo

FB	15	(England) Max Malins
RW	14	(Australia) Luke Morahan	(substituted off) 78'
OC	13	(Fiji) Semi Radradra	(substituted off) 60'
IC	12	(Tonga) Siale Piutau (c)
LW	11	(Samoa) Alapati Leiua
FH	10	(Wales) Callum Sheedy
SH	9	(England) Harry Randall	(substituted off) 78'
N8	8	(England) Ben Earl
OF	7	(Wales) Dan Thomas
BF	6	(Samoa) Chris Vui	(substituted off) 40'
RL	5	(England) Joe Joyce	(substituted off) 70'
LL	4	(England) Dave Attwood
TP	3	(England) Kyle Sinckler	(substituted off) 55'
HK	2	(England) Harry Thacker	(substituted off) 78'
LP	1	(England) Yann Thomas	(substituted off) 55'
Substitutions:
HK	16	(England) George Kloska	(substituted on) 78'
PR	17	(England) Jake Woolmore	(substituted on) 55'
PR	18	(New Zealand) John Afoa	(substituted on) 55'
LK	19	(England) Ed Holmes	(substituted on) 70'
FL	20	(New Zealand) Jake Heenan	(substituted on) 40'
SH	21	(England) Tom Kessell	(substituted on) 78'
FH	22	(England) Piers O'Conor	(substituted on) 60'
CE	23	(Ireland) Niyi Adeolokun	(substituted on) 78'
Coach:
(Samoa) Pat Lam

== Attendances ==
Does not include the attendance at the final as it takes place at a neutral venue, or the attendances of matches played in empty stadiums due to the COVID-19 pandemic in Europe.

Club	Home Games	Total	Average	Highest	Lowest	% Capacity
(France) Agen	3	7,580	2,527	3,570	1,997	18%
(France) Bayonne	3	21,566	7,189	9,053	5,057	42%
(France) Bordeaux Bègles	3	43,694	14,565	17,553	12,233	42%
(England) Bristol Bears	3	32,505	10,835	11,120	10,511	40%
(France) Brive	3	9,335	3,112	4,533	1,800	19%
(Italy) Calvisano	3	5,450	1,817	2,500	950	36%
(Wales) Cardiff Blues	3	17,612	5,871	7,122	4,668	48%
(France) Castres	3	24,507	8,169	8,277	7,957	65%
(Wales) Dragons	3	12,088	4,029	4,038	4,013	46%
(Scotland) Edinburgh	3	17,529	5,843	6,387	5,432	9%
(Russia) Enisei-STM	3	700	233	400	100	1%
(England) Leicester Tigers	3	46,861	15,620	16,538	15,073	60%
(England) London Irish	3	9,083	3,028	3,444	2,632	13%
(France) Pau	3	14,115	4,705	6,124	3,724	26%
(Wales) Scarlets	3	20,575	6,858	7,565	6,257	46%
(France) Stade Français	3	6,000	2,000	2,000	2,000	10%
(France) Toulon	3	38,575	12,858	15,336	10,212	71%
(England) Wasps	3	20,847	6,949	7,594	6,107	21%
(England) Worcester Warriors	3	20,124	6,708	6,938	6,287	58%
(Italy) Zebre	3	6,100	2,033	2,200	1,900	41%

== Player scoring ==
- Appearance figures also include coming on as substitutes (unused substitutes not included).

=== Most points ===
Rank	Player	Team	Apps	Points
1	(England) Jamie Shillcock	Worcester Warriors	5	67
2	(France) Matthieu Jalibert	Bordeaux Bègles	5	62
3	(Wales) Sam Davies	Dragons	5	60
4	(Wales) Leigh Halfpenny	Scarlets	4	46
5	(France) Clovis Lebail	Pau	5	42
6	(France) Anthony Belleau	Toulon	4	40
6	(Wales) Jarrod Evans	Cardiff Blues	4	40
7	(England) Callum Sheedy	Bristol Bears	5	37
8	(Georgia (country)) Tedo Abzhandadze	Brive	6	35
9	(France) Joris Segonds	Stade Français	6	33

=== Most tries ===
Rank	Player	Team	Apps	Tries
1	(England) Jamie Shillcock	Worcester Warriors	5	5
2	(Wales) Jonah Holmes	Leicester Tigers	1	4
2	(Wales) Josh Adams	Cardiff Blues	2	4
2	(Wales) Owen Lane	Cardiff Blues	3	4
2	(Fiji) Albert Tuisue	London Irish	3	4
2	(Scotland) Darcy Graham	Edinburgh	4	4
2	(South Africa) Duhan van der Merwe	Edinburgh	4	4
2	(England) Will Capon	Bristol Bears	5	4
2	(England) Ollie Lawrence	Worcester Warriors	5	4
2	(Georgia (country)) Vasil Lobzhanidze	Brive	5	4
2	(France) Vincent Pinto	Pau	6	4

== Season records ==
=== Team ===
Largest home win – 56 points

66–10 Worcester Warriors at home to Enisei-STM on 11 January 2020

Largest away win – 70 points

73–3 Bordeaux Bègles away to Agen on 6 December 2019

Most points scored – 73 points

73–3 Bordeaux Bègles away to Agen on 6 December 2019

Most tries in a match – 11

Bordeaux Bègles away to Agen on 6 December 2019

Most conversions in a match – 9

Bordeaux Bègles away to Agen on 6 December 2019

Most penalties in a match – 6

Dragons at home to Worcester Warriors on 13 December 2019

Most drop goals in a match – 2

Leicester Tigers at home to Cardiff Blues on 12 January 2020

=== Player ===
Most points in a match – 27

(England) Jamie Shillcock for Worcester Warriors away to Enisey-STM on 15 November 2019

Most tries in a match – 4 (2)

(England) Jonah Holmes for Leicester Tigers at home to Pau on 16 November 2019
(Scotland) Darcy Graham for Edinburgh at home to Agen on 18 January 2020

Most conversions in a match – 8 (2)

(France) Clovis Lebail for Pau at home to Calvisano on 22 November 2019
(England) Jamie Shillcock for Worcester Warriors at home to Enisei-STM on 11 January 2020

Most penalties in a match – 6

(Wales) Sam Davies for Dragons at home to Worcester Warriors on 13 December 2019

Most drop goals in a match – 2

(England) George Ford for Leicester Tigers at home to Cardiff Blues on 12 January 2020

=== Attendances ===
Highest – 17,553

Bordeaux Bègles at home to Edinburgh on 11 January 2020

Lowest – 100

Enisei-STM at home to Castres on 6 December 2019

Highest average attendance — 15,620

Leicester Tigers

Lowest average attendance — 233

Enisei-STM

== See also ==
- 2019–20 European Rugby Champions Cup
