= 2020–21 European Rugby Champions Cup pool stage =

The 2020–21 European Rugby Champions Cup pool stage is the first stage of the 26th season of European club rugby union, and the seventh under the European Rugby Champions Cup format. Due to the COVID-19 pandemic delaying the end of the previous tournament, twenty-four clubs from the three major European domestic and regional leagues would compete in the Champions Cup in a one-year exceptional basis. EPCR chief Vincent Gaillard confirmed the 24-team tournament in August 2020.

Locations
Locations of teams of the 2020–21 European Rugby Champions Cup group stage.
Red: Pool A; Blue: Pool B.

The competition was suspended on 11 January 2021.

== Seeding ==
For the purposes of the pool draw, the 24 clubs were separated into tiers based on their league finishing position, and clubs from the same league in the same tier were not drawn into the same pool. The number 1 and number 2 ranked clubs from each league are in Tier 1, the number 3 and number 4 ranked clubs are in Tier 2, the number 5 and 6 ranked clubs are in Tier 3, and the number 7 and number 8 ranked clubs are in Tier 4.

Pool play will feature the Tier 1 teams playing the Tier 4 teams in their pool (that are not from the same league) twice in a home and away manner, while the Tier 2 and 3 clubs will follow in a similar manner.

The four teams from each pool with the best points will qualify for the knockout stage. Teams finishing 5th through 8th after pool play will join the Challenge Cup at the round of 16 stage (joining eight qualifiers from the Challenge Cup pool stage) In total, eight weekends of play will be provided for, one less than in previous seasons.

Tier	Rank	Top 14	Premiership	Pro14
1	1	(France) Bordeaux Bègles	(England) Exeter Chiefs	(Ireland) Leinster
1	2	(France) Lyon	(England) Wasps	(Ireland) Ulster
2	3	(France) Racing 92	(England) Bristol Bears	(Scotland) Edinburgh
2	4	(France) Toulon	(England) Bath	(Ireland) Munster
3	5	(France) La Rochelle	(England) Sale Sharks	(Wales) Scarlets
3	6	(France) Clermont	(England) Harlequins	(Ireland) Connacht
4	7	(France) Toulouse	(England) Gloucester	(Scotland) Glasgow Warriors
4	8	(France) Montpellier	(England) Northampton Saints	(Wales) Dragons

== Pool stage ==
The draw took place on 28 October 2020, at the Maison du Sport International in Lausanne, Switzerland.

Teams in the same pool play two other teams twice, at home and away, in the group stage that began on the weekend of 11–13 December 2020, and ended prematurely on 18–20 December 2020. The top four teams in each pool progress to the quarter-finals, with the teams ranked 5-8 progressing to the 2020–21 European Rugby Challenge Cup round of 16.

Teams are awarded group points based on match performances. Four points are awarded for a win, two points for a draw, one attacking bonus point for scoring four or more tries in a match and one defensive bonus point for losing a match by seven points or fewer.

In the event of a tie between two or more teams, the following tie-breakers are used, as directed by EPCR:

1. Where teams have played each other
  1. The club with the greater number of competition points from only matches involving tied teams.
  2. If equal, the club with the best aggregate points difference from those matches.
  3. If equal, the club that scored the most tries in those matches.
2. Where teams remain tied and/or have not played each other in the competition (i.e. are from different pools)
  1. The club with the best aggregate points difference from the pool stage.
  2. If equal, the club that scored the most tries in the pool stage.
  3. If equal, the club with the fewest players suspended in the pool stage.
  4. If equal, the drawing of lots will determine a club's ranking.

Key to colours
Top 4 of each pool, advance to quarter-finals
Teams 5–8 in pool advance to 2020–21 European Rugby Challenge Cup round of 16.

(C) denotes the team has qualified for the Champions Cup quarter-finals

(Q) denotes the team has qualified for the Challenge Cup quarter-finals

(q) denotes team has at least qualified for the quarter-finals of one of the tournaments

=== Pool A ===
Team	P	W	D	L	PF	PA	Diff	TF	TA	TB	LB	Pts
(Ireland) Leinster	2	2	0	0	70	33	+37	9	4	2	0	10
(England) Wasps	2	2	0	0	57	22	+35	9	3	2	0	10
(France) Bordeaux Bègles	2	2	0	0	63	20	+43	8	1	1	0	9
(France) La Rochelle	2	2	0	0	41	8	+33	6	1	1	0	9
(Wales) Scarlets	2	2	0	0	51	19	+32	6	2	1	0	9
(Scotland) Edinburgh	2	1	0	1	24	28	-4	2	4	0	1	5
(France) Toulon	2	1	0	1	26	42	-16	2	6	0	0	4
(England) Sale Sharks	2	0	0	2	29	42	-13	4	3	0	1	1
(England) Northampton Saints	2	0	0	2	31	51	-20	3	5	0	1	1
(England) Bath	2	0	0	2	19	51	-32	2	6	0	1	1
(France) Montpellier	2	0	0	2	28	68	-40	3	10	0	0	0
(Wales) Dragons	2	0	0	2	16	71	-55	2	11	0	0	0

==== Round 1 ====
11 December 2020
17:30

(1 BP) Northampton Saints (England)	12–16	(France) Bordeaux Bègles
Pen: Biggar (4/4) 7', 13', 27', 45'	Report	Try: Cordero 74' c Con: Jalibert (1/1) 75'; Pen: Botica (3/4) 25', 36', 40' +2

Franklin's Gardens
Attendance: 2,000 (Note: Spectators limited to 2,000 due to local restrictions surrounding the COVID-19 pandemic.)
Referee: Ben Whitehouse (Wales)

12 December 2020
16:15

Toulon (France)	26–14	(England) Sale Sharks
Try: Villière 29' c Moyano 56' c Con: Carbonel (2/2) 30', 57'; Pen: Carbonel (4/4) 21', 27', 40'+1, 45'	Report	Try: Yarde 66' c Phillips 70' c Con: MacGinty (2/2) 67', 71'

Stade Mayol
Referee: Frank Murphy (Ireland)

12 December 2020
15:15

(1 BP) Bath (England)	19–23	(Wales) Scarlets
Try: McConnochie 19' m Stuart 53' m Pen: Spencer (3/3) 3', 26', 35'	Report	Try: G. Davies 8' c Hardy 65' c Con: Halfpenny (2/2) 9', 65'; Pen: Halfpenny (3/4) 33', 47', 76'

Recreation Ground
Attendance: 2,000
Referee: Alexandre Ruiz (France)

12 December 2020
17:30

Dragons (Wales)	8–24	(England) Wasps (1 BP)
Try: Holmes 50' m Pen: S. Davies (1/3) 24'	Report	Try: Cruse 20' m Robson 30' c J. Willis 70' m Young 73' m Con: Gopperth (2/4) 30', 74'

Rodney Parade
Referee: Romain Poite (France)

12 December 2020
18:30

Montpellier (France)	14–35	(Ireland) Leinster (1 BP)
Try: N'Gandebe 77' m Pen: Paillaugue (3/3) 21', 33', 43'	Report	Try: van der Flier 5' m Frawley 26' m Kearney 36' c Leavy 69' m O'Brien 80' c Con: R. Byrne (1/3) 37'; H. Byrne (1/2) 80' +1; Pen: R. Byrne (1/1) 11'; H. Byrne (1/1) 64'

GGL Stadium
Referee: Karl Dickson (England)

12 December 2020
20:00

(1 BP) Edinburgh (Scotland)	8–13	(France) La Rochelle
Try: Kinghorn 52' m Pen: van der Walt (1/1) 38'	Report	Try: Rhule 25' m Sinzelle 43' m Pen: Plisson (1/2) 12'

BT Murrayfield
Referee: Luke Pearce (England)

==== Round 2 ====
18 December 2020
17:30

(1 BP) Scarlets (Wales)	Cancelled (Note: Due to a positive COVID-19 test on the Scarlets team, Toulon chose to forfeit the match on safety grounds.); 28–0	(France) Toulon

Parc y Scarlets
Referee: Wayne Barnes (England)

18 December 2020
20:00

(1 BP) Wasps (England)	33–14	(France) Montpellier
Try: Barbeary (2) 23' m, 63' c Gaskell 28' c Odogwu 50' c Atkinson 80' m Con: Gopperth (3/4) 28', 51', 63'; Atkinson (1/1) 80'+1	Report	Try: Lozowski 32' c Reilhac 46' c Con: Paillaugue (2/2) 33', 47'

Ricoh Arena
Attendance: 0 (Note: Match played behind closed doors due to local restrictions surrounding the COVID-19 pandemic.)
Referee: Andrew Brace (Ireland)

19 December 2020
13:00

Leinster (Ireland)	35–19	(England) Northampton Saints
Try: Murphy 3' c Healy 16' c Kearney 40'+2 m Gibson-Park 43' c Con: R. Byrne (3/4) 4', 17', 44'; Pen: R. Byrne (3/3) 28', 61', 72'	Report	Try: Dingwall 22' c James 35' c Isiekwe 44' m Con: Hutchinson (2/3) 22', 35'

RDS Arena
Referee: Pierre Brousset (France)

19 December 2020
16:15

(1 BP) La Rochelle (France)	Cancelled (Note: Several Bath Rugby players have been required to self-isolate due to COVID-19 and therefore are unable to field a team.); 28–0	(England) Bath

Stade Marcel-Deflandre
Referee: Ben Whitehouse (Wales)

19 December 2020
20:00

(1 BP) Sale Sharks (England)	15–16	(Scotland) Edinburgh
Try: Solomona 13' c Janse van Rensburg 20' m Con: R. du Preez (1/2) 15'; Pen: R. du Preez (1/1) 70'	Report	Try: Bennett 52' c Con: van der Walt (1/1) 53'; Pen: van der Walt (3/4) 58', 62', 71'

AJ Bell Stadium
Attendance: 0
Referee: Romain Poite (France)

19 December 2020
21:00

(1 BP) Bordeaux Bègles (France)	47–8	(Wales) Dragons
Try: Diaby 8' c Jalibert 44' c Cordero (3) 33' m, 42' c, 61' c Lamothe 40'+2; Lam 73' c Con: Jalibert (5/6) 9', 40'+3, 42', 44', 62'; Botica (1/1) 74'	Report	Try: Tompkins 70'; Pen: Lewis 12'

Stade Chaban-Delmas
Referee: Christophe Ridley (England)

The pool stage was temporarily suspended following round 2. It was later confirmed that rounds 3 and 4 would not take place.

=== Pool B ===
Team	P	W	D	L	PF	PA	Diff	TF	TA	TB	LB	Pts
(France) Lyon	2	2	0	0	83	10	+73	12	1	1	0	10
(France) Racing 92	2	2	0	0	75	29	+46	11	4	2	0	10
(France) Toulouse	2	2	0	0	57	22	+35	8	3	2	0	10
(Ireland) Munster	2	2	0	0	60	38	+22	5	5	0	0	8
(France) Clermont	2	1	0	1	82	77	+5	11	8	2	0	6
(England) Bristol Bears	2	1	0	1	65	69	-4	9	9	2	0	6
(England) Exeter Chiefs	2	1	0	1	42	28	+14	6	4	1	0	5
(England) Gloucester	2	1	0	1	48	89	-41	6	12	1	0	5
(Ireland) Ulster	2	0	0	2	56	67	-11	7	9	1	2	3
(Ireland) Connacht	2	0	0	2	40	53	-13	5	8	0	1	1
(England) Harlequins	2	0	0	2	14	70	-56	2	9	0	0	0
(Scotland) Glasgow Warriors	2	0	0	2	0	70	-70	0	10	0	0	0

==== Round 1 ====
11 December 2020
20:00

(1 BP) Ulster (Ireland)	22–29	(France) Toulouse (1 BP)
Try: Herring (2) 14' c, 57' c Madigan 17' m Con: Cooney (2/3) 15', 59'; Pen: Cooney (1/2) 44'	Report	Try: Kolbe (2) 20' c, 65' m Dupont 39' c Arnold 53' c Con: Ramos (3/4) 21', 40', 54'; Pen: Ramos (1/1) 77'

Kingspan Stadium
Referee: Matthew Carley (England)

12 December 2020
13:00

(1 BP) Bristol Bears (England)	38–51	(France) Clermont (1 BP)
Try: Malins 21' c Byrne 36' c Randall 49' c Lloyd 74' c S. Piutau 78' c Con: Sheedy (3/3) 22', 37', 50'; Malins (2/2) 74', 78'; Pen: Sheedy (1/1) 43'	Report	Try: Matsushima (3) 4' c, 27' m, 69' c Naqalevu 7' c Penaud (2) 15' c, 53' c Lee 64' m Con: Lopez (5/7) 5', 8', 16', 54', 70'; Pen: Lopez (2/2) 39', 45'

Ashton Gate
Attendance: 0
Referee: Andrew Brace (Ireland)

13 December 2020
14:00

(1 BP) Lyon (France)	55–10	(England) Gloucester
Try: Mignot (3) 10' c, 53' m, 62' c Nakaitaci 14' m Rodda 18' c Bastareaud 25' c Ngatai 43' c Cretin 74' c Con: Wisniewski (5/7) 11', 19', 25', 45', 64'; Berdeu (1/1) 74'; Pen: Wisniewski (1/1) 47'		Try: Nagle-Taylor 20' c Con: Barton (1/1) 21'; Pen: Barton (1/1) 28'

Matmut Stadium de Gerland
Referee: Mike Adamson (Scotland)

13 December 2020
16:15

(1 BP) Racing 92 (France)	26–22	(Ireland) Connacht (1 BP)
Try: Colombe 6' c Beale 17' c Taofifénua 24' m Bird 51' c Con: Machenaud (1/1) 7'; Iribaren (2/3) 19', 52'	Report	Try: Healy 40'+1 m Wootton 62' c Oliver 76' c Con: Daly (2/2) 63', 76'; Pen: Carty (1/1) 12'

Paris La Défense Arena
Referee: Wayne Barnes (England)

13 December 2020
15:15

(1 BP) Exeter Chiefs (England)	42–0	(Scotland) Glasgow Warriors
Try: S. Simmonds 13' c Gray 24' c Hogg 42' c Yeandle 54' c Woodburn 66' c Hill 80'+2 c Con: J. Simmonds (6/6) 15', 24', 43', 55', 68', 80'+3	Report

Sandy Park
Attendance: 2,000
Referee: Mathieu Raynal (France)

13 December 2020
17:30

Munster (Ireland)	21–7	(England) Harlequins
Try: Penalty try 50'; Coombes 70' m Pen: Hanrahan (2/2) 13', 38'; Healy (1/1) 63'	Report	Try: Murley 56' c Con: Smith (1/1) 57'

Thomond Park
Referee: Pascal Gauzère (France)

==== Round 2 ====
19 December 2020
13:00

Glasgow Warriors (Scotland)	Cancelled (Note: Due to a number of positive tests for COVID-19 on the Exeter Chiefs team. Several members of Glasgow are forced to self isolate and they are unable to field a team and therefore forfeit the match.); 0–28	(France) Lyon (1 BP)

Scostoun
Referee: Karl Dickson (England)

19 December 2020
15:15

(1 BP) Gloucester (England)	38–34	(Ireland) Ulster (2 BP)
Try: Rees-Zammit 6' c Penalty try (2) 27', 75'; Atkinson 42' c Barton 80'+5 c Con: Evans (3/3) 8', 44', 80'+6; Pen: Evans (1/1) 23'	Report	Try: Burns 11' c Cooney 68' c Lowry 53' c Penalty try 58'; Con: Cooney (3/3) 12', 54', 66'; Pen: Cooney (2/3) 34', 66'

Kingsholm
Attendance: 2,000
Referee: Alex Ruiz (France)

19 December 2020
18:30

(1 BP) Clermont (France)	31–39	(Ireland) Munster
Try: Raka 1' c Penalty try 7'; Penaud 15' c Fourcade 24' c Con: Lopez (3/3) 2', 16', 26'; Pen: Lopez (1/1) 61'	Report	Try: Haley 29' c Stander 70' c O'Byrne 78' c Con: Hanrahan (3/3) 30', 72', 78'; Pen: Hanrahan (6/6) 5', 9', 20', 44', 53', 58'

Stade Marcel-Michelin
Referee: Matthew Carley (England)

20 December 2020
15:15

Harlequins (England)	7–49	(France) Racing 92 (1 BP)
Try: Steele 61' c Con: Smith (1/1) 62'	Report	Try: Thomas 4' c Le Guen 17' c Zebo 42' m Colombe 50' m Taofifénua 58' m Baubigny 71' c Trinh-Duc 77' c Con: Machenaud (2/4) 5', 18'; Trinh-Duc (2/2) 72', 78'; Pen: Machenaud (2/2) 13', 22'

Twickenham Stoop
Attendance: 0
Referee: Frank Murphy (Ireland)

20 December 2020
16:15

(1 BP) Toulouse (France)	Cancelled (Note: Due to a number of positive tests for COVID-19 on the Exeter Chiefs team they are unable to field a team and therefore forfeit the match.); 28–0	(England) Exeter Chiefs

Stade Ernest Wallon
Referee: Mike Adamson (Scotland)

20 December 2020
17:30

Connacht (Ireland)	18–27	(England) Bristol Bears (1 BP)
Try: O'Halloran 57' c Porch 75' m Con: Carty (1/2) 58'; Pen: Carty (2/2) 40'+2, 67'	Report	Try: Byrne 35' m Holmes 48' c O'Conor 51' c Lloyd 72' m Con: Sheedy (2/4) 49', 52'; Pen: Sheedy (1/1) 79'

The Sportsground
Referee: Mathieu Raynal (France)

The competition was temporarily suspended following round 2. It was later confirmed that rounds 3 and 4 would not take place.

== See also ==
- 2020–21 European Rugby Challenge Cup
