= 2020–21 European Rugby Challenge Cup preliminary stage =

Seventh season of the European Rugby Challenge Cup

The 2020–21 European Rugby Challenge Cup preliminary stage is the first stage of the competition in what is the seventh season of the European Rugby Challenge Cup. The competition involves fourteen teams competing in a single league – with teams playing three opponents from another domestic competition home and away. The preliminary stage began on 11 December 2020 and was due to be completed on 23 January 2021.

The top eight ranked teams in the league will advance to the last 16 with the teams ranked fifth to eight in both pools of the Champions Cup.

Teams are awarded group points based on match performances. Four points are awarded for a win, two points for a draw, one attacking bonus point for scoring four or more tries in a match and one defensive bonus point for losing a match by seven points or fewer.

The preliminary stage was suspended after two rounds on 11 January 2021.

== Tiebreakers ==
In the event of a tie between two or more teams, the following tie-breakers are used, as directed by EPCR:

1. Where teams have played each other
  1. The club with the greater number of competition points from only matches involving tied teams.
  2. If equal, the club with the best aggregate points difference from those matches.
  3. If equal, the club that scored the most tries in those matches.
2. Where teams remain tied and/or have not played each other in the competition (i.e. are from different pools)
  1. The club with the best aggregate points difference from the pool stage.
  2. If equal, the club that scored the most tries in the pool stage.
  3. If equal, the club with the fewest players suspended in the pool stage.
  4. If equal, the drawing of lots will determine a club's ranking.

== Table ==
Key to colours
Top 8, advance to round of 16
Eliminated from tournament

Team	P	W	D	L	PF	PA	Diff	TF	TA	TB	LB	Pts
(England) London Irish	2	2	0	0	60	25	+35	9	3	2	0	10
(Wales) Ospreys	2	2	0	0	77	44	+33	9	6	2	0	10
(Wales) Cardiff Blues	2	2	0	0	61	20	+41	7	2	1	0	9
(England) Leicester Tigers	2	2	0	0	67	37	+30	7	3	1	0	9
(Italy) Zebre	2	1	1	0	43	41	+2	5	4	0	0	6
(France) Agen	2	1	0	1	36	34	+2	5	5	1	0	5
(Italy) Benetton	2	1	0	1	44	48	−4	7	7	1	0	5
(England) Newcastle Falcons	2	1	0	1	46	50	−4	5	6	0	0	4
(France) Pau	2	1	0	1	41	46	−5	5	6	0	0	4
(France) Bayonne	2	0	1	1	45	53	−8	5	6	0	0	2
(England) Worcester Warriors	2	0	0	2	49	62	−13	6	7	1	1	2
(France) Brive	2	0	0	2	33	57	−24	2	6	0	1	1
(France) Castres	2	0	0	2	32	65	−33	5	8	0	0	0
(France) Stade Français	2	0	0	2	20	72	−52	3	11	0	0	0

== Matches ==
=== Round 1 ===
11 December 2020
18:30

Stade Français (France)	20–44	(Italy) Benetton (1 BP)
Try: Francoz 12' m Panis 68' c Lapegue 75' m Con: Hall (1/2) 69'; Pen: Coville (1/1) 7'	Report	Try: Halafihi 9' m Duvenage 14' m Sarto 21' c Hayward 24' m Allan 54' c Ruzza 72' m Sgarbi 80'+3 c Con: Allan (3/7) 22', 55', 80'+4; Pen: Allan (1/1) 19'

Stade Jean-Bouin
Referee: Ben Blain (Scotland)

11 December 2020
19:45

(1 BP) Leicester Tigers (England)	39–17	(France) Brive
Try: T. Youngs 33' m B. Youngs 65' m Brink 78' c Nadolo 79' c Con: Ford (2/3) 78', 80'+1; Pen: Díaz Bonilla (3/3) 3', 24', 38'	Report	Try: Douglas 70' m Pen: Hervé (3/3) 9', 18', 54'

Mattioli Woods Welford Road
Attendance: 0 (Note: Match played behind closed doors due to local restrictions surrounding the COVID-19 pandemic.)
Referee: Nika Amashukeli (Georgia)

11 December 2020
20:00

Newcastle Falcons (England)	20–33	(Wales) Cardiff Blues
Try: Wacokecoke 18' c Stuart 36' c Con: Hodgson (2/2) 21', 37'; Pen: Hodgson (2/2) 13', 75'	Report	Try: Amos 17' c To. Williams 49' c Penalty try 77'; Con: Evans (2/2) 18', 50'; Pen: Evans (4/4) 10', 21', 45', 57'

Kingston Park
Attendance: 0
Referee: Ludovic Cayre (France)

12 December 2020
14:00

Zebre (Italy)	25–25	(France) Bayonne
Try: Laloifi 1' m Rizzi 31' c Nocera 67' c Con: Rizzi (2/3) 32', 68'; Pen: Rizzi (2/3) 27', 40'+2	Report	Try: Ruru 16' c Baget 44' m Delonca 62' c Con: Ordas (2/3) 17', 63'; Pen: Ordas (2/2) 9', 20'

Stadio Sergio Lanfranchi
Referee: Adam Jones (Wales)

12 December 2020
15:00

Agen (France)	8–34	(England) London Irish (1 BP)
Try: Railevu 50' m Pen: Reid (1/1) 16'	Report	Try: Tuisue (2) 11' m, 28' c Mafi 35' c Hassell-Collins 44' m Cokanasiga 80' c Con: Brophy-Clews (2/3) 29', 36'; Atkins (1/1) 80'+1; Pen: Atkins (1/1) 58'

Stade Armandie
Referee: Chris Busby (Ireland)

12 December 2020
21:00

Pau (France)	24–20	(England) Worcester Warriors (1 BP)
Try: Corato 17' c Barrett 40'+3 c Erbani 79' c Con: Marques (2/2) 17', 40'+3; Le Bail (1/1) 80'+1; Pen: Marques (1/1) 52'	Report	Try: Simpson 22' c Penalty try 12'; Con: Shillcock (1/1) 23'; Pen: Shillcock (2/3) 56', 62'

Stade du Hameau
Referee: Andrea Piardi (ITA)

12 December 2020
20:00

(1 BP) Ospreys (Wales)	39–15	(France) Castres
Try: Venter 22' m Parry (2) 29' c, 39' c D. Evans 67' c Morgan 80'+1 c Con: Myler (4/5) 30', 40'+1, 68', 80'+2; Pen: Myler (2/2) 6', 14'	Report	Try: Kormath 54' c Amans 71' m Con: Fortunel (1/1) 56'; Pen: Fortunel (1/1) 17'

Liberty Stadium
Referee: Tom Foley (England)

=== Round 2 ===
18 December 2020
18:30

Castres (France)	17–26	(England) Newcastle Falcons
Try: Bouzerand (2) 26' m, 29' m Botitu 78' c Con: Bourgier (1/1) 79'	Report	Try: Stuart 56' m Arscott 67' m Basham 76' c Con: Connon (1/3) 77'; Pen: Connon (3/4) 16', 39', 40'+2

Stade Pierre-Fabre
Referee: Craig Evans (Wales)

18 December 2020
21:00

(1 BP) Brive (France)	16–18	(Italy) Zebre
Try: Galletier 5' c Con: Abzhandadze (1/1) 6'; Pen: Abzhandadze (3/3) 17', 52', 66'	Report	Try: Violi 14' c Bruno 33' m Con: Canna (1/2) 14'; Pen: Canna (2/3) 69', 80'

Stade Amédée-Domenech
Referee: Adam Leal (England)

19 December 2020
14:00

Benetton (Italy)	Cancelled (Note: Cancelled due to positive COVID-19 test on the Benetton team.); 0–28	(France) Agen (1 BP)

Stadio Comunale di Monigo
Referee: Sam Grove-White (Scotland)

19 December 2020
20:00

(1 BP) Worcester Warriors (England)	29–39	(Wales) Ospreys (1 BP)
Try: Lawrence 17' c Nanai 28' m Searle 52' c Hill 57' c Con: Shillcock (3/4) 18', 53', 58'; Pen: Shillcock (1/2) 49'	Report	Try: Penalty try 34'; Parry 39' m Morris 68' c North 74' c Con: Myler (2/3) 68', 75'; Pen: Myler (4/4) 4', 13', 78', 80'

Sixways
Attendance: 2,000 (Note: Spectators numbers limited to 2,000 due to local restrictions surrounding the COVID-19 pandemic.)
Referee: Nika Amashukeli (Georgia)

19 December 2020
21:00

Bayonne (France)	20–28	(England) Leicester Tigers
Try: Zabalza 40'+2 c Gorcioaia 69' c Con: Germain (2/2) 40'+3, 69'; Pen: Germain (2/2) 8', 10'	Report	Try: Reffell 10' c Kelly 28' c Murimurivalu 60' m Con: Henry (2/3) 11', 30'; Pen: Henry (3/3) 24', 43', 45'

Stade Jean Dauger
Referee: Chris Busby (Ireland)

20 December 2020
15:00

(1 BP) London Irish (England)	26–17	(France) Pau
Try: Stokes (2) 11' c, 36' c Cokanasiga 40' c Parton 50' m Con: Jackson (3/4) 12', 37', 40'+1	Report	Try: Septar 21' c Debaes 80' c Con: Le Bail (1/1) 22'; Marques (1/1) 80'; Pen: Le Bail (1/2) 42'

Brentford Community Stadium
Attendance: 0
Referee: Gianluca Gnecchi (Italy)

20 December 2020
17:30

(1 BP) Cardiff Blues (Wales)	Cancelled; 28–0	(France) Stade Français

Rodney Parade
Referee: Craig Maxwell-Keys (England)

Following round 2 the competition was temporarily suspended. It was later confirmed that the postponed matches would not take place.
