= Ethan Dumortier =

French rugby union player (born 2000)

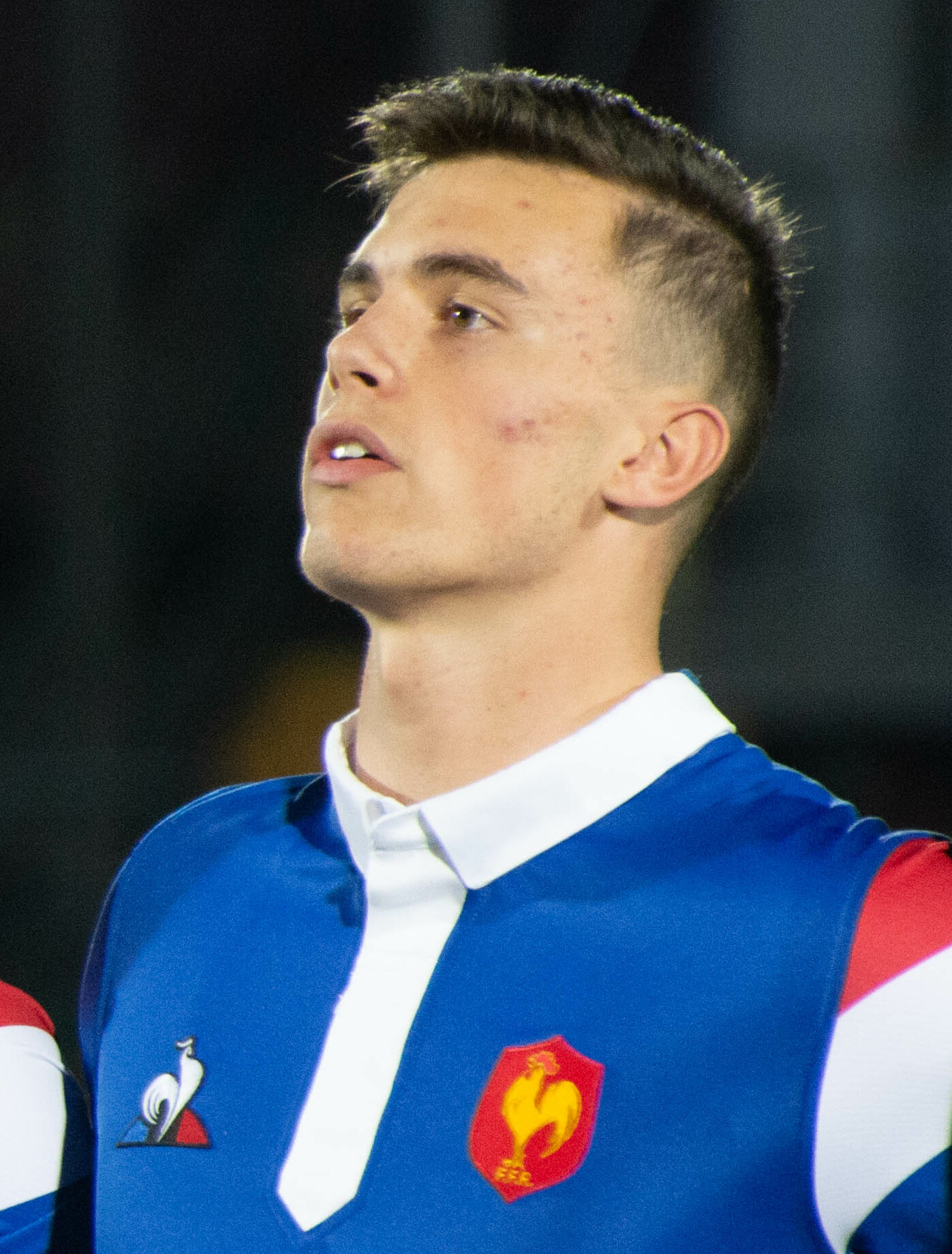
- Dumortier representing France during the Six Nations Under 20s Championship
- Born: 29 December 2000 (age 25) Lyon, France
- Height: 1.92 m (6 ft 4 in)
- Weight: 93 kg (205 lb; 14 st 9 lb)

Rugby union career
- Position(s): Wing, Centre
- Current team: Lyon
Senior career
Years	Team	Apps	(Points)
2019–	Lyon	86	(150)
- Correct as of 27 February 2025
International career
Years	Team	Apps	(Points)
2019–2020	France U20	4	(15)
2023–	France	6	(10)
- Correct as of 5 August 2023
National sevens team
Years	Team		Comps
2020–2022	France		4
- Correct as of 18 March 2023

Ethan Dumortier (born 29 December 2000) is a French professional rugby union player who plays as a wing for Top 14 club Lyon and the France national team.

== Professional career ==
=== Lyon ===
Dumortier started his professional career with Lyon during the 2019–20 European Challenge Cup. On 29 November 2020, he made his Top 14 debuts for Lyon in a home win against Stade Français.

=== France ===
Dumortier was first called to the France senior team in October 2022 for the Autumn internationals.

== Career statistics ==
=== International tries ===
International tries
No.	Date	Venue	Opponent	Score	Result	Competition
1	5 February 2023	Stadio Olimpico, Rome, Italy	Italy	6–17	24–29	2023 Six Nations
2	26 February 2023	Stade de France, Saint-Denis, France	Scotland	12–0	32–21	2023 Six Nations

== Honours ==
Lyon

- 1× EPCR Challenge Cup: 2022

France U20

- 1× World Rugby Under 20 Championship: 2019
