= Earll Douwrie =

South African rugby union player

- Full name: Earll Ethian Douwrie
- Born: 11 December 1997 (age 28) South Africa
- Height: 1.83 m (6 ft 0 in)
- Weight: 90 kg (200 lb)

Rugby union career
- Position: Fullback
- Current team: Enisei-STM
Senior career
Years	Team	Apps	(Points)
2016–2018	Blue Bulls XV	12	(89)
2019–2022	Enisei-STM	23	(58)
2022–	Dinamo Moscow	0	(0)
- Correct as of 27 July 2022

Earll Douwrie (born 11 December 1997) is a South African rugby union player for the Griquas in the Currie Cup. His regular position is fullback.

He previously represented Enisei-STM in the European Rugby Challenge Cup, making 6 appearances over the course of the 2019–20 European Rugby Challenge Cup. He joined the Griquas ahead of the newly formed Super Rugby Unlocked competition.
