= Paul Bruno =

French professional rugby union player

- Born: Paul Bruno; 9 October 1992 (age 34)
- Height: 1.69 m (5 ft 7 in)
- Weight: 92 kg (14 st 7 lb)

Rugby union career
- Position: Prop
Senior career
Years	Team	Apps	(Points)
2014-	Bayonne	1	(0)
- Correct as of 6 December 2014

Paul Bruno is a French professional rugby union player. He currently plays at prop for Bayonne in the Top 14.
