= Sam Lewis (rugby union, born 1998) =

English rugby union player

- Born: Sam Lewis; 27 April 1998 (age 28) Stafford, Staffordshire, England
- Height: 6 ft 5 in (196 cm)
- Weight: 17 st 9 lb (247 lb; 112 kg)
- School: Denstone College

Rugby union career
- Position: Lock/Flanker
- Current team: Calvisano
Senior career
Years	Team	Apps	(Points)
2017–2021	Leicester Tigers	21	(10)
2018―2020	→Nottingham (loan)	11	(0)
2021	→Coventry (loan)	9	(10)
2021−2022	Calvisano	16	(0)
- Correct as of 17 June 2021
International career
Years	Team	Apps	(Points)
2018	England U20	8	(0)

Sam Lewis (born 27 April 1998) is an English professional rugby union player for Calvisano in Italy's Top10, the top domestic division of rugby union in Italy. His usual positions are either lock or flanker.

He has previously played for Leicester Tigers in Premiership Rugby, and on loan with Nottingham and Coventry in the RFU Championship.

== Career ==
Lewis made his debut for Leicester Tigers on 4 November 2017 in the 2017-18 Anglo-Welsh Cup at Welford Road against Gloucester in a 26–24 win. Lewis signed a new contract with Leicester on 24 January 2018. He was named in the England under 20s squad for the 2018 World Rugby Under 20 Championship. He was sent off against Italy in the group stages.

In February 2021 it was confirmed that he would join RFU Championship side Coventry ahead of the 2020–21 season on a deal that would see him dual registered with the Tigers. On 16 June 2021 his release was announced by Leicester Tigers. From 2018 to 2020, he has previously played for Leicester Tigers in Premiership Rugby, and on loan with Nottingham and Coventry in the RFU Championship.

In 2021−2022 season he played for Calvisano in Italy's Top10, the top domestic division of rugby union in Italy.
