= Michelangelo Biondelli =

Italian rugby union player

- Born: 15 May 1998 (age 28) Ferrara
- Height: 1.83 m (6 ft 0 in)
- Weight: 90 kg (14 st 2 lb; 198 lb)
- Occupation: police officer

Rugby union career
- Position(s): Fly-Half, Fullback
- Current team: Fiamme Oro
Youth career
- 2002−2014: CUS Ferrara
- 2014−2016: Rovigo Delta
Senior career
| Years | Team | Apps | (Points) |
| 2016-2017 | F.I.R. Academy | | |
| 2017−2018 | Viadana | 11 | (25) |
| 2018−2019 | Fiamme Oro | 14 | (109) |
| 2019−2022 | Zebre | 35 | (50) |
| 2019−2021 | →Fiamme Oro | 6 | (16) |
| 2022− | Fiamme Oro | | |
- Correct as of 14 May 2022
International career
| Years | Team | Apps | (Points) |
| 2017−2018 | Italy Under 20 | 13 | (2) |
| 2021−2022 | Emerging Italy | 2 | (0) |
| 2020− | Italy | 0 | (0) |
| 2022 | Italy A | 1 | (0) |
- Correct as of 24 Jun 2022

Michelangelo Biondelli (born 15 May 1998) is an Italian rugby union player. His usual position is as a Fly-Half or Fullback and he currently plays for Fiamme Oro in Top10.

From 2019 to 2022 Biondelli played for Zebre in Pro14 with a Dual contract in order to play on loan as Permit Player with Fiamme Oro in Top10.

After playing for Italy Under 20, in 2017 and 2018, in January 2020 Biondelli was named in the Italian squad for the 2020 Six Nations Championship. On the 8 December 2021, he was selected by Alessandro Troncon to be part of an Emerging Italy 27-man squad for the 2021 end-of-year rugby union internationals. On 26 May he was called in Italy A squad for the South African tour in the 2022 mid-year rugby union tests against Namibia and Currie Cup XV team.
