= Paolo Pescetto =

Italian rugby union player

- Born: 12 January 1995 (age 31) Genova, Italy
- Height: 1.70 m (5 ft 7 in)
- Weight: 80 kg (12 st 8 lb; 176 lb)

Rugby union career
- Position: Fly-Half
- Current team: Valorugby Emilia
Youth career
- 2007−2014: CUS Genova
- 2014−2015: Narbonne
Senior career
Years	Team	Apps	(Points)
2015−2018	Narbonne	22	(27)
2018−2020	Calvisano	38	(320)
2020	→Zebre	1	(0)
2020−2022	Zebre	11	(45)
2022−2024	Colorno	34	(66)
2024−	Valorugby Emilia		
- Correct as of 8 Apr 2022
International career
Years	Team	Apps	(Points)
2016–2021	Emerging Italy	4	(8)
- Correct as of 20 May 2020

Paolo Pescetto (Genova, 12 January 1995) is an Italian rugby union player. His usual position is as a Fly-Half and he currently plays for Valorugby Emilia in Serie A Elite.

For 2019–20 Pro14 season, he was named as Additional Player for Zebre. In 2020–21 Pro14 and 2021–22 United Rugby Championship seasons he played for Zebre. It was announced on 6 January 2022 that he was leaving Zebre to join Colorno. He played with Colorno until summer 2024.

In 2016 and 2021 Pescetto was named in the Emerging Italy squad for the Nations Cup and for the 2021 end-of-year rugby union internationals
