= Clovis Le Bail =

French rugby union player

- Born: 29 November 1995 (age 30) Nantes, France
- Height: 1.77 m (5 ft 9 1/2 in)
- Weight: 71 kg (157 lb)

Rugby union career
- Position: Scrum-half
Senior career
| Years | Team | Apps | (Points) |
| 2015–2023 | Section Paloise | 103 | (208) |
| 2023– | Racing 92 | 31 | (10) |
- Correct as of 12 January 2025

Clovis Le Bail (born 29 November 1995) is a French rugby union player, who plays for Racing 92. His regular playing position is scrum-half.

He was called by Fabien Galthié to the French national team for the first time in June 2021, for the Australia summer tour.
