= Bastien Pourailly =

French rugby union footballer

- Born: 31 January 1994 (age 32) Aramits, France
- Height: 1.77 m (5 ft 10 in)
- Weight: 83 kg (183 lb)

Rugby union career
- Position: Wing
- Current team: Clermont
Senior career
| Years | Team | Apps | (Points) |
| 2014–2020 | Pau | 48 | (40) |
| 2020– | Clermont | 3 | (0) |
- Correct as of 6 September 2020

Bastien Pourailly (born 31 January 1994) is a French rugby union player who plays for ASM Clermont Auvergne in the Top 14. His position is wing.
