= Piers O'Conor =

English rugby union fullback

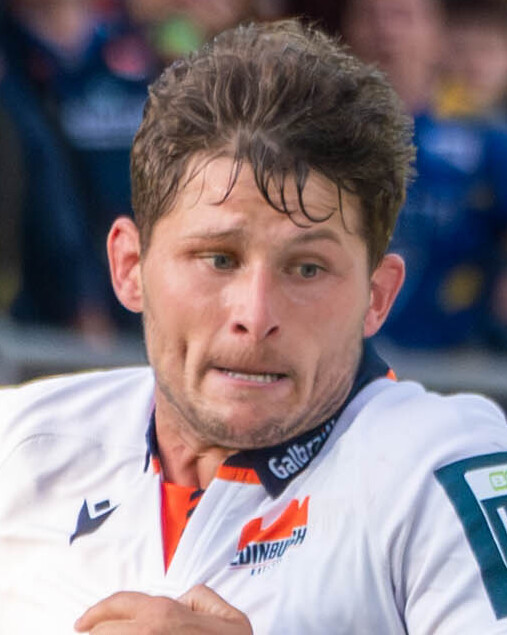
- Born: Piers O'Conor; 28 August 1995 (age 31) Sydney, Australia
- Height: 1.85 m (6 ft 1 in)
- Weight: 102 kg (225 lb)
- School: Eastbourne College

Rugby union career
- Position(s): Centre, Fullback
- Current team: Edinburgh
Senior career
Years	Team	Apps	(Points)
2014–2017	Wasps	7	(5)
2014–2015	→ Henley Hawks (loan)	10	(29)
2015–2017	→ Bedford Blues (loan)	30	(80)
2017–2018	Ealing Trailfinders	21	(45)
2018–2024	Bristol Bears	137	(180)
2024–2025	Connacht	18	(15)
2025–	Edinburgh	21	(10)
- Correct as of 19 September 2026
International career
Years	Team	Apps	(Points)
2013	Ireland U-19s	1	(0)
2014	England 7s	6	(5)
2015	England U20s	10	(5)
2019	England XV	1	(0)
- Correct as of 21 December 2020

Piers O'Conor (born 28 August 1995) is an English professional rugby union player who plays as a centre or fullback for United Rugby Championship club Edinburgh. At international youth level he represented Ireland under-19 and England under-20.

== Early life ==
Born in Sydney, Australia, O'Conor was raised in England. He is also eligible to represent Ireland and New Zealand through ancestry.

O'Conor took up rugby at Cumnor House School aged seven. He played for several clubs in Sussex, including winning the national U-17s Bowl with Heathfield and Waldron in 2012, before joining Eastbourne College where he was coached by Russell Earnshaw.

== Career ==
O'Conor played for Ireland under-19s in 2013 before signing for Wasps. He made his Wasps debut in November 2014 in the Anglo-Welsh Cup against Sale Sharks.

O'Conor played for the England U20 side that won the 2015 Six Nations Under 20s Championship and scored his only try of the tournament in a win over Ireland at Donnybrook Stadium. Later that year he was a member of their squad at the 2015 World Rugby Under 20 Championship and had a try disallowed in the final against New Zealand which England lost to finish runners up.

In 2017 O'Conor left Wasps and joined Ealing Trailfinders in the RFU Championship. After one season with Ealing he moved on to newly promoted Bristol Bears. O'Conor scored four tries in twenty matches during the 2018–19 Premiership Rugby campaign and his form led to him being selected by coach Eddie Jones to start for an England XV against Barbarians in an uncapped match at Twickenham Stadium on 2 June 2019. The following season saw O'Conor come off the bench as a substitute in the final of the 2019–20 European Rugby Challenge Cup as Bristol defeated RC Toulon to win their first ever European trophy.

In April 2024 it was announced that O'Conor would join Connacht for the 2024–25 United Rugby Championship.

On 14 May 2025, O'Conor would move to Scotland to sign for capital club Edinburgh on a two-year deal ahad of the 2025-26 season.

== Honours ==
Bristol Bears

- 1x EPCR Challenge Cup: 2019–20

England U20

- 1x Six Nations Under 20s Championship: 2015
- 1x World Rugby U20 Championship runner up: 2015
