= Will Capon =

English rugby union player

- Born: William Joseph Capon; 12 October 1999 (age 27) Bristol, England
- Height: 1.80 m (5 ft 11 in)
- Weight: 108 kg (17 st 0 lb)
- School: Bristol Grammar School
- University: University of Bristol

Rugby union career
- Position: Hooker
- Current team: Bristol Bears
Senior career
Years	Team	Apps	(Points)
2018–	Bristol Bears	32	(10)
- Correct as of 21 June 2021
International career
Years	Team	Apps	(Points)
2017–2018	England U18	10	(15)
2019	England U20	5	(5)
- Correct as of 21 June 2021

Will Capon (born 12 October 1999) is an English professional rugby union player who plays at hooker for Premiership Rugby club Bristol Bears.

== Career ==
Capon started playing rugby at the age of seven at Winscombe R.F.C. and joined the Bristol Bears academy in 2014 while studying at Bristol Grammar School. In April 2018 he made his senior Bristol debut as they defeated Doncaster Knights to win the RFU Championship and secure promotion back to the top flight.

In August 2017 Capon scored a try for the England under-18 team against France. He was a member of the squad at the 2019 World Rugby Under 20 Championship and scored a try against Wales to finish in fifth place.

In June 2021 he was called up to a senior England training squad by head coach Eddie Jones.

== Legal Issues ==
In 2026, Capon was charged with rape in connection with an alleged incident in Exeter in September 2021. He appeared at Exeter Crown Court where he denied the charge and was granted unconditional bail pending a trial scheduled for September 2027. Following the court appearance, his club, Bristol Bears, confirmed that he had been suspended from all club activities.
