= Gervais Cordin =

French rugby union footballer

- Born: Gervais Cordin; 10 December 1998 (age 27) Grenoble, France
- Height: 1.72 m (5 ft 8 in)
- Weight: 73 kg (161 lb)

Rugby union career
- Position: Fullback
- Current team: Toulon
Amateur team(s)
Years	Team	Apps	(Points)
–2016	CS Nuiton		
2016–2017	Grenoble		
Senior career
Years	Team	Apps	(Points)
2017–2019	Grenoble	20	(20)
2019–	Toulon	74	(60)
- Correct as of 1 December 2022
International career
Years	Team	Apps	(Points)
2020–	France	1	(0)
- Correct as of 16 March 2020

Gervais Cordin (born 10 December 1998) is a French rugby union player who plays for Toulon in the Top 14 and the French national team. His position is fullback.

== Honours ==
=== International ===
France (U20)

- Six Nations Under 20s Championship: 2018
