= Callum Sheedy =

Wales international rugby union footballer

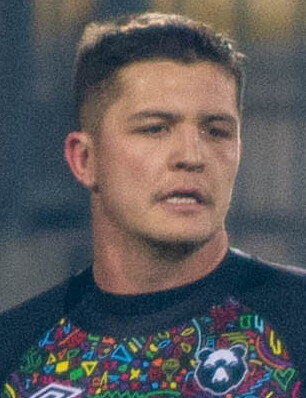
- Born: Callum Michael Sheedy; 28 October 1995 (age 31) Cardiff, Wales
- Height: 5 ft 9 in (1.75 m)
- Weight: 180 lb (12 st 12 lb; 82 kg)
- School: Corpus Christi High School, Cardiff; Millfield School

Rugby union career
- Position: Fly-half
- Current team: Cardiff rugby
Senior career
Years	Team	Apps	(Points)
2014–2024	Bristol Bears	164	(1130)
2014–2015	→ Clifton (loan)	1	(3)
2014–2015	→ Dings Crusaders (loan)	7	(5)
2014–2016	→ Cinderford (loan)	20	(131)
2016–2017	→ Jersey Reds (loan)	10	(39)
2024–	Cardiff	40	(167)
- Correct as of 13 August 2026
International career
Years	Team	Apps	(Points)
- Wales U16
2014	Ireland 7s	6	
2019	England XV	1	
2020-	Wales	17	(71)

Callum Michael Sheedy (born 28 October 1995) is a professional rugby union player for Cardiff in the United Rugby Championship and for the Wales national team as a fly-half.

== Club career ==
=== Bristol ===
Sheedy has previously played on loan for Clifton, Dings Crusaders, Cinderford and Jersey Reds.

Sheedy joined the Bristol Bears ahead of the 2014–15 RFU Championship campaign and scored 22 points in a stunning display in the play-off final to help Bristol achieve promotion.

Sheedy made his 100th appearance for Bristol on 27 March 2021, kicking a last-minute conversion to beat Harlequins.

=== Cardiff ===
On 30 January 2024, after many years at Bristol, Sheedy returned to his home city, joining Cardiff in the URC competition on a long-term deal from the 2024–25 season.

In the European Challenge Cup, Sheedy kicked a penalty in the 80th minute to win the game against Ulster.

== International career ==
=== Age grade rugby ===
Born in Cardiff, Wales, Sheedy qualified for Ireland through his parents and England through residency; he has appeared for Wales at under 16 level, and Ireland under 19, while declining selection for Wales under 20. In June 2019 in an uncapped "England XV" side to face the Barbarians.

=== Wales ===
He was named in the senior Wales squad for the 2020 Autumn Nations Cup. On 13 November 2020, Sheedy made his international debut for Wales, coming off the bench in a 32–9 loss to Ireland. The following week, Sheedy was partnered at halfback by Kieran Hardy, the two having previously played together for Jersey Reds in 2017.

On 13 March 2021, Sheedy scored his first international try for Wales against Italy in the 2021 Six Nations.

On 20 October 2025, Sheedy was recalled by Wales for the first time since 2022, and named in the squad for the 2025 end-of-year rugby union internationals.

=== International tries ===
Try	Opponent	Location	Venue	Competition	Date	Result
1	Italy	Rome, Italy	Stadio Olimpico	2021 Six Nations	13 March 2021	Win

== Personal life ==
Sheedy grew up watching Cardiff at the Arms Park, attending the matches with his father. He has spoken openly of his struggles with mental health, and works as an ambassador to provide support for others.

== Honours ==
Bristol

- RFU Championship: 2015–16, 2017–18
- European Challenge Cup: 2019–20

Wales

- Six Nations Championship: 2021
