= Tom Cruse =

English rugby union player

- Born: Thomas Mark Cruse; 30 March 1989 (age 37) Stockport, Greater Manchester, England
- Height: 1.79 m (5 ft 10 in)
- Weight: 100 kg (15 st 10 lb)

Rugby union career
- Position: Hooker
Amateur team(s)
Years	Team	Apps	(Points)
- Stockport RUFC
–	Macclesfield		
Senior career
Years	Team	Apps	(Points)
2012–2013	Sale Sharks	2	(0)
2013–2015	Rotherham Titans	44	(55)
2015–2016	London Irish	14	(0)
2016–2022	Wasps	114	(100)
2022	Edinburgh Rugby	5	(0)
2022–	Northampton Saints	16	(5)
- Correct as of 15 January 2023

Tom Cruse (born 30 March 1989) is an English rugby union player who plays hooker for Northampton Saints.

Cruse began his senior playing career at Stockport RUFC where his talent was apparent, earning him a contract with Sale Sharks. After a season with Sale, he signed his first professional contract with Rotherham Titans in the RFU Championship from the 2013-14 season.

Cruse was the stand-out hooker in the RFU Championship in the 2015 season while playing for Rotherham Titans, before signing with London Irish for the 2015/16 season.

In early March 2016, Cruse announced his move to Wasps for that season. Since then, Cruse has earned a reputation as one of the most mobile front row forwards in the Premiership. He signed a contract extension ahead of the 2021–22 season.

Wasps entered administration on 17 October 2022 and Cruse was made redundant along with all other players and coaching staff. On 22 November 2022 Edinburgh Rugby confirmed the signing of Cruse on a short-term deal.
