= Anthony Étrillard =

France international rugby union player

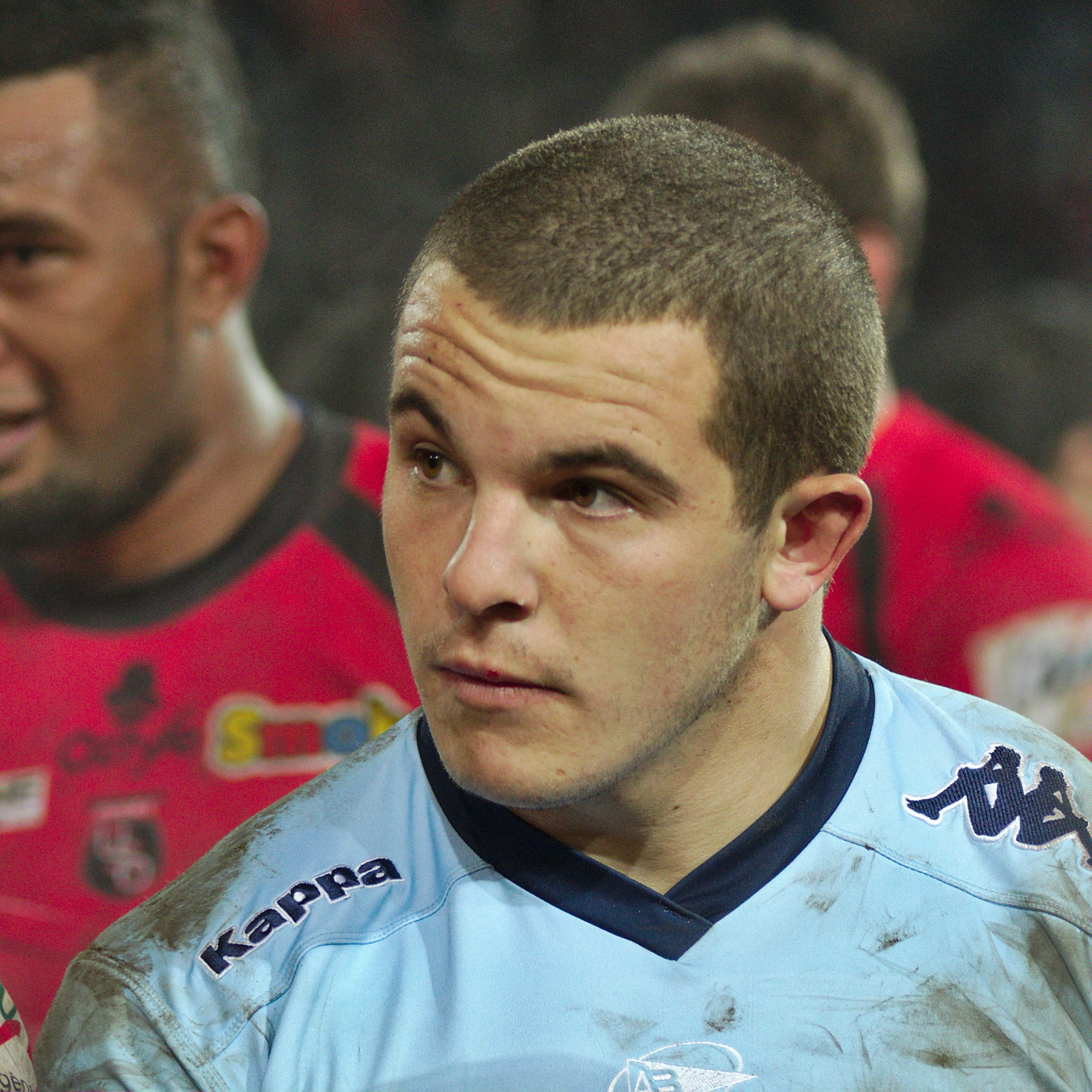
- Étrillard with Bayonne in 2013
- Born: Anthony Étrillard; 21 March 1993 (age 33) France
- Height: 1.80 m (5 ft 11 in)
- Weight: 108 kg (17 st 0 lb; 238 lb)

Rugby union career
- Position: Hooker
- Current team: Toulon
Senior career
| Years | Team | Apps | (Points) |
| 2013–2015 | Bayonne | 43 | (10) |
| 2015– | Toulon | 130 | (25) |
- Correct as of 11 January 2020
International career
| Years | Team | Apps | (Points) |
| 2021 | France | 3 | (0) |
- Correct as of 17 July 2021

Anthony Étrillard (born 21 March 1993) is a French rugby union player. His position is hooker and he currently plays for Toulon in the Top 14.
