= Santiago Cordero =

Argentine rugby union footballer

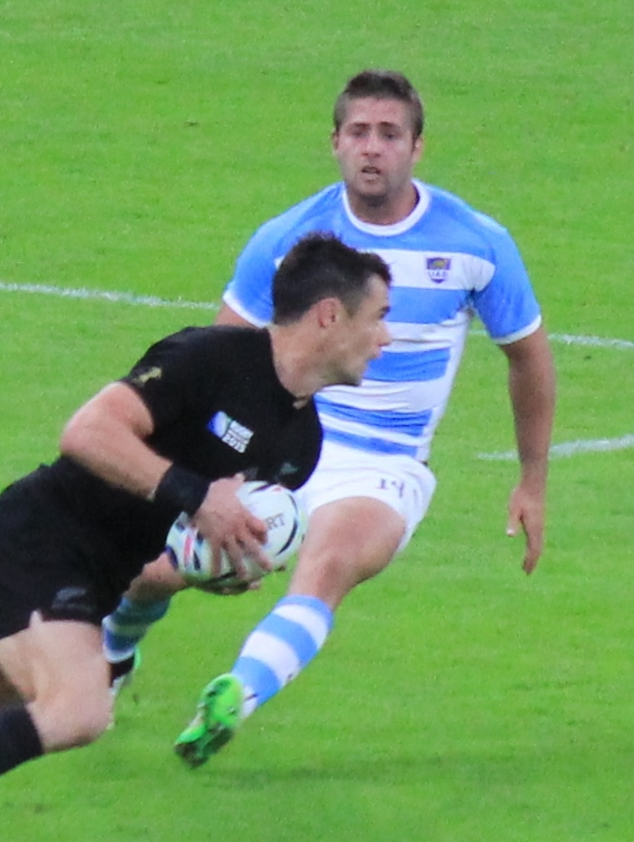
- Cordero in 2015
- Full name: Santiago Cordero
- Born: 6 December 1993 (age 32) Buenos Aires, Argentina
- Height: 1.73 m (5 ft 8 in)
- Weight: 80 kg (12 st 8 lb; 180 lb)
- Notable relative: Facundo Cordero (brother)

Rugby union career
- Position(s): Wing, Fullback
- Current team: Pampas XV
Amateur team(s)
Years	Team	Apps	(Points)
2012–2015	Regatas	11	(90)
Senior career
Years	Team	Apps	(Points)
2013–2015	Pampas XV	14	(42)
2016−2017	Jaguares	11	(20)
2017–2019	Exeter Chiefs	33	(50)
2019–2023	Bordeaux	68	(137)
2023–2025	Connacht	20	(5)
2026-	Pampas XV	2	(15)
- Correct as of 27 December 2025
International career
Years	Team	Apps	(Points)
2012	Argentina U19	1	(0)
2012–2013	Argentina U20	15	(15)
2015	Argentina A	2	(0)
2013–2025	Argentina	56	(90)
- Correct as of 27 December 2025

Santiago Cordero (born 6 December 1993) is an Argentine rugby union player currently playing for Argentina side Pampas XV in the Super Rugby Americas. He plays as wing or fullback.

He made his debut in 2012 at his training club, Club Regatas de Bella Vista.

== Career ==
His first test match for Argentina was the 31–12 loss to England, at 9 November 2013, in Twickenham Stadium, when he was 19 years old.

Cordero played one match in the 2013 End-of-year rugby union test for the Barbarians against Fiji, at the Centenary Match to mark 100 years of rugby in Fiji.

Santiago caught the attention of a wider rugby audience during the 2015 World Cup with his pace and stepping skills, having scored memorable tries, two against Georgia (in which he was named "Man of the Match") and one against Tonga. His clean breaks and distance covered were also noteworthy, thus making significant contributions to Argentina's fourth place in the tournament.

Cordero scored one try for the Argentinian side that beat the Barbarians 49–31 in the 2015 Killik Cup match, held at Twickenham on 21 November 2015.

In 2016 and 2017 he played for Jaguares, the Argentinian team in Super Rugby. He joined Exeter Chiefs in the Premiership Rugby in early 2018 as a medical joker, and became a full-time player for the 2018–19 season.

Cordero signed for Exeter Chiefs in 2018 and has since played 33 games scoring 10 tries. In March 2019 he was awarded the Gallagher Premiership Rugby Player of the Month, and in May 2019 was announced as one of the five nominees for the prestigious Rugby Players Association Player of the Year award.

On 6 January 2019, Cordero left Exeter to join French side Bordeaux in the Top 14 competition ahead of the 2019–20 season.

On 23 March 2023, Connacht Rugby announced that Cordero had signed for the club on a 2-year deal, beginning in the 2023–24 season.

In May 2025, Connacht Rugby announced that Cordero would be leaving at the end of the season. No new club had been announced at the time.

On 19 July 2025, Cordero announced his retirement from the international team.

Santiago Cordero is one of Argentina's top try scorers, with 18 tries in 56 caps for Los Pumas.
