= Sam Davies (rugby union) =

Welsh rugby union player

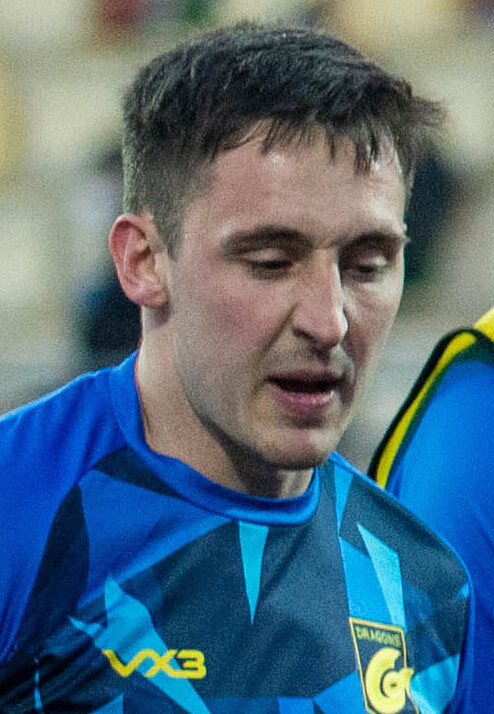
- Born: Samuel Davies; 6 October 1993 (age 33) Swansea, Wales
- Height: 1.8 m (5 ft 11 in)
- Weight: 89 kg (14 st 0 lb; 196 lb)

Rugby union career
- Position: Fly-half
- Current team: FC Grenoble
Senior career
| Years | Team | Apps | (Points) |
| 2011–2013 | Swansea | 30 | (267) |
| 2012–2019 | Ospreys | 150 | (836) |
| 2019–2023 | Dragons | 70 | (557) |
| 2023- | Grenoble | 40 | (390) |
- Correct as of 14 February 2025
International career
| Years | Team | Apps | (Points) |
| 2012–2013 | Wales U20 | 18 | (177) |
| 2016–2017 | Wales | 8 | (24) |
- Correct as of 23 June 2017

Sam Davies (born 6 October 1993) is a Wales international rugby union player who plays for Grenoble

== Career ==
Davies made his debut for the Ospreys in 2012. He joined the Dragons for the 2019/20 season on a two-year deal. Ahead of the 2023/24 season, Davies signed for Grenoble on a two-year deal.

== International ==
In April 2012, he was named in the Wales Under-20 squad for the Junior World Cup in South Africa.

In January 2013, he was selected in the Wales Under 20 squad for the 2013 Under 20 Six Nations Championship.

In June 2013, Davies was named IRB Junior Player of the Year

On 5 November 2016, he made his senior debut for Wales versus Australia as a second-half replacement.

On 19 November 2016, he was substituted on to kick a drop goal versus Japan for the win.

On 5 February 2017, Davies played as fly-half for the whole of the second half of Wales versus Italy on the first weekend of the 2017 Six Nations Championship.

== Personal ==
Sam Davies is the son of former Wales caretaker head coach Nigel Davies.
