= Louis Carbonel =

French rugby union player

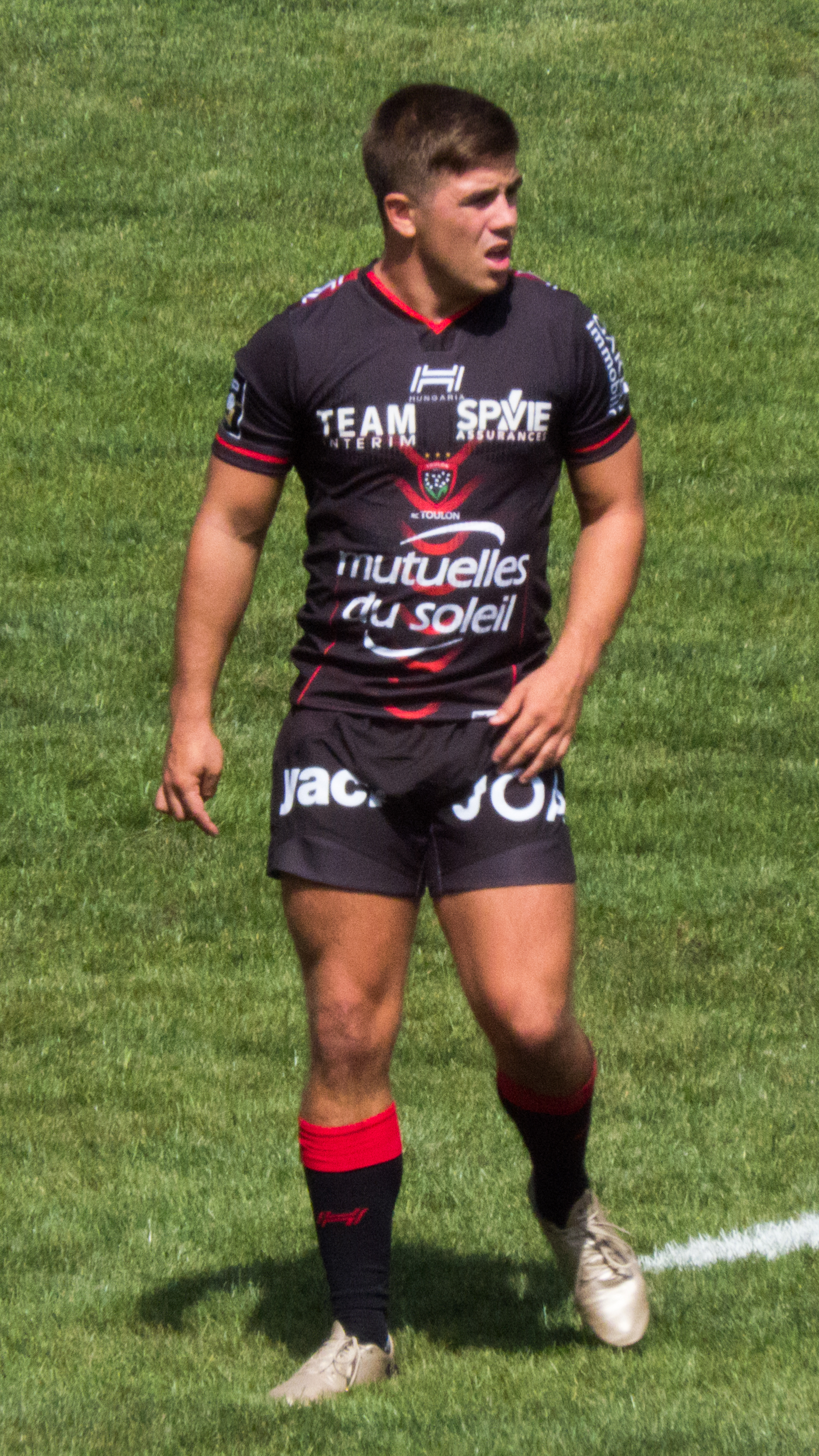
- Carbonel playing for Montpellier in 2022
- Born: Louis Carbonel; 4 February 1999 (age 27) Toulon, France
- Height: 1.80 m (5 ft 11 in)
- Weight: 82 kg (181 lb; 12 st 13 lb)

Rugby union career
- Position: Fly-half
- Current team: Stade Français
Amateur team(s)
Years	Team	Apps	(Points)
- RC Canton Garde Pradet
2005–2017	Toulon		
Senior career
Years	Team	Apps	(Points)
2017–2022	Toulon	99	(667)
2022–2024	Montpellier	55	(444)
2024–	Stade Français	23	(183)
- Correct as of 6 June 2025
International career
Years	Team	Apps	(Points)
2018–2019	France U20	14	(140)
2018	French Barbarians	1	(4)
2020–	France	5	(16)
- Correct as of 13 July 2021

Louis Carbonel (born 4 February 1999) is a French rugby union player. His position is fly-half and he currently plays for Stade Français in the Top 14.

== International honours ==
France (U20)

- Six Nations Under 20s Championship winners: 2018
- World Rugby Under 20 Championship winners (2): 2018, 2019
