= Jamie Shillcock =

English rugby union full back

- Born: James Robert Shillcock; 1 August 1997 (age 29) Coventry, England
- Height: 5 ft 10 in (178 cm)
- Weight: 14 st 4 lb (200 lb; 91 kg)
- School: Warwick School

Rugby union career
- Position(s): Fullback, Fly-half
- Current team: CA Brive
Senior career
Years	Team	Apps	(Points)
2015–2022	Worcester Warriors	96	(335)
2022	Bath	1	(0)
2022–2023	Sagamihara DynaBoars	11	(84)
2023–2025	Leicester Tigers	50	(195)
2025–	CA Brive		
- Correct as of 15 June 2025
International career
Years	Team	Apps	(Points)
2016	England U20	3	(0)
2024–2025	England A	3	(11)
- Correct as of 23 February 2025

James Robert Shillcock (born 1 August 1997) is an English professional rugby union player for CA Brive in France's Pro D2, the second division. His primary positions are fullback and fly-half. He previously played for Mitsubishi Sagamihara DynaBoars in Japan's Rugby League One, and for Worcester Warriors, Bath and Leicester Tigers in Premiership Rugby.

== Career ==
Shillcock began playing rugby for Warwick School at the age of 7. He made his debut for Worcester Warriors at the age of 17 against London Scottish in the RFU Championship semi-finals; becoming the youngest player to feature in the play-offs.

After making his debut at scrum-half he later played both full back and fly-half. By the time he extended his contract with Worcester in December 2018 he was used predominantly at fly half.

On 5 October 2022 all Worcester players had their contacts terminated due to the liquidation of the company to which they were contracted.

Shortly after having his contract terminated at Worcester Shillcock was signed by Bath on a short-term deal along with former Worcester teammate Billy Searle. He then joined Mitsubishi Sagamihara DynaBoars in Japan Rugby League One for the 2022–23 Japan Rugby League One – Division 1 season.

On 26 January 2023, Leicester Tigers announced Shillcock as a new signing for the 2023-24 season.

In February 2024 Shillcock scored nine points for the England A side during a victory over Portugal.
