= Tedo Abzhandadze =

Georgia international rugby union player

- Full name: Tedo Abzhandadze
- Born: 13 June 1999 (age 27) Kutaisi, Georgia
- Height: 174 cm (5 ft 9 in)
- Weight: 80 kg (176 lb; 12 st 8 lb)

Rugby union career
- Position: Fly-half
- Current team: US Montauban
Youth career
- Aia Kutaisi
Senior career
Years	Team	Apps	(Points)
2016-2017	Aia Kutaisi	7	(22)
2017-2018	Terenure College	6	(39)
2018-2019	Aia Kutaisi	25	(183)
2019-2022	CA Brive	26	(102)
2022-2024	US Montauban	22	(99)
2024-	Aurillac	33	(254)
- Correct as of 6 July 2026
International career
Years	Team	Apps	(Points)
2016-2017	Georgia Under-18	12	
2017-2019	Georgia Under-20	15	(67)
2018-	Georgia	67	(404)
- Correct as of 6 July 2026

Tedo Abzhandadze (born 13 June 1999) is a Georgian rugby union player who plays as a fly-half for Aurillacin the French Pro D2 and the Georgia national team. |url=https://www.allrugby.com/joueurs/tedo-abzhandadze-7212.html|access-date=2026-04-09|
