= Ed Holmes =

English rugby union player

- Born: Edward T. Holmes; 27 December 1995 (age 30)
- Height: 1.95 m (6 ft 5 in)
- Weight: 118 kg (18 st 8 lb)
- School: Truro and Penwith College
- University: University of Plymouth

Rugby union career
- Position(s): Lock, Flanker
- Current team: Shimizu Koto Blue Sharks
Senior career
| Years | Team | Apps | (Points) |
| 2017–2018 | Exeter Chiefs | 1 | (0) |
| 2018–2024 | Bristol Bears | 98 | (25) |
| 2024– | Shimizu Koto Blue Sharks | 22 | (10) |
- Correct as of 10 December 2024

Ed Holmes (born 27 December 1995) is a professional rugby union player who plays for Shimizu Koto Blue Sharks in Japan Rugby League One competition.

He played on 30 March 2018 as Exeter beat Bath Rugby in the final of the Anglo-Welsh Cup. The previous season he had played in the Anglo-Welsh cup final but Exeter lost to Leicester Tigers on that occasion.

He made senior debut for the Chiefs in the LV Cup away to the Cardiff Blues in February 2015.

He has spent time on loan at Plymouth Albion where he made over 50 appearances before joining Bristol on 26 March 2018.

He joined Bristol firstly on loan from Exeter Chiefs in March 2018, and made the move permanent one month later.

He made his Bristol debut in a 60–17 victory against Nottingham and drew praise from Bristol head coach Pat Lam for his provenance.

Since September 2024, Holmes have left Bristol as he travelled to Japan to sign for Shimizu Koto Blue Sharks in their League One competition for the 2024–25 season.

== Honours ==
Anglo-Welsh Cup

Winner 2017-18

Runner-Up 2016-17
