= Matthieu Jalibert =

French rugby union player (born 1998)

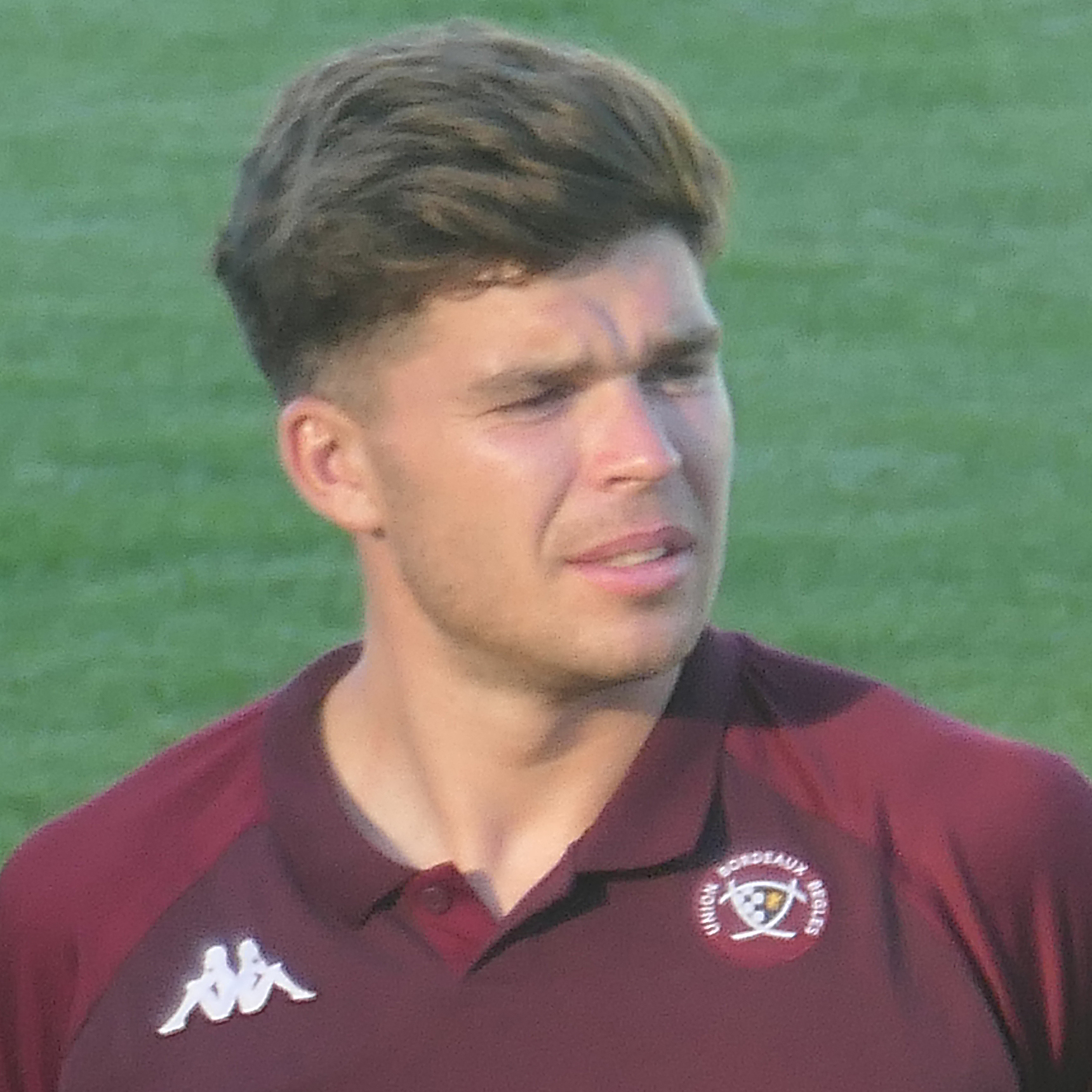
- Jalibert with Bordeaux Bègles in 2022
- Born: Matthieu Jalibert; 6 November 1998 (age 28) Saint-Germain-en-Laye, France
- Height: 1.84 m (6 ft 1/2 in)
- Weight: 84 kg (185 lb; 13 st 3 lb)

Rugby union career
- Position: Fly-half
- Current team: Bordeaux Bègles
Youth career
- 2004–2007: Stade Calédonien
- 2007–2016: CA Bordeaux Bègles
- 2016–2017: Bordeaux Bègles
Senior career
Years	Team	Apps	(Points)
2017–	Bordeaux Bègles	169	(1,426)
- Correct as of 22 September 2026
International career
Years	Team	Apps	(Points)
2017	France U20	3	(17)
2018–	France	42	(114)
- Correct as of 22 September 2026

Matthieu Jalibert (born 6 November 1998) is a French professional rugby union player who currently plays for Bordeaux Bègles and France national rugby union team. His position is fly-half.

== Early life ==
Jalibert was born in Saint-Germain-en-Laye, a few miles west of Paris. He and his family lived in Noumea, in the overseas French territory of New Caledonia from 2004 to 2007, where his father was stationed as a soldier.

Jalibert joined CA Bordeaux Bègles on the family’s return to France. He moved up to the UBB (Union Bordeaux Bègles) as a teenager, and at 16 he played in the French under-18 championship, helping Bordeaux to the final.

== Rugby playing career ==
=== Club ===
Jalibert currently plays for Bordeaux Bègles in the Top 14.

=== International career ===
Jalibert previously represented France in the U20 Rugby World Cup.

Jalibert was called up to the French national team for the first time ahead of France's opening 2018 Six Nations Championship match against Ireland, aged only 19, after 15 league appearances for Bordeaux Bègles. He started in that game but had to come off in the 29th minute for Anthony Belleau due to a serious knee injury, which required a head injury assessment, in an eventual 13–15 home loss.

In February 2025, Jalibert was named in the starting lineup to face England in the second round of the 2025 Six Nations replacing Romain Ntamack after he was banned following a dangerous tackle in the previous game. This was the first time he had been involved in the starting lineup after refusing to play back up for Thomas Ramos during the 2024 Autumn Nations Series.

==== International tries ====
International tries
No.	Date	Venue	Opponent	Score	Result	Competition
1	14 November 2021	Matmut Atlantique, Bordeaux, France	Georgia	15–3	41–15	2021 Autumn internationals
2	5 February 2023	Stadio Olimpico, Rome, Italy	Italy	24–27	24–29	2023 Six Nations
3	6 October 2023	Parc Olympique Lyonnais, Décines-Charpieu, France	Italy	36–0	60–7	2023 Rugby World Cup
4	5 February 2026	Stade de France, Saint-Denis, France	Ireland	12–0	36–14	2026 Six Nations
5	15 February 2026	Millennium Stadium, Cardiff, Wales	Wales	7–24	12–54	2026 Six Nations

== Honours ==
France

- 2x Six Nations Championship: 2025, 2026

Bordeaux Bègles

- 2× European Rugby Champions Cup: 2025, 2026
