= Jonah Holmes =

Wales international rugby union player

- Born: Jonah Holmes; 24 July 1992 (age 34) Stockport, Greater Manchester, England
- Height: 1.86 m (6 ft 1 in)
- Weight: 98 kg (15 st 6 lb; 216 lb)
- Notable relative: Andy Holmes (uncle)

Rugby union career
- Position(s): Wing; Fullback
- Current team: London Scottish
Senior career
Years	Team	Apps	(Points)
2010–2014	London Wasps	15	(10)
2010–2011	Rosslyn Park	12	(0)
2011–2013	Henley Hawks	16	(50)
2012–2013	London Welsh	1	(0)
2013–2017	Yorkshire Carnegie	85	(250)
2017–2020	Leicester Tigers	45	(120)
2020–2022	Dragons	31	(70)
2022–2024	Ealing Trailfinders	36	(105)
2024–	London Scottish	11	(20)
- Correct as of 6 August 2024
International career
Years	Team	Apps	(Points)
2018–2021	Wales	7	(10)
- Correct as of 16 September 2023

Jonah Holmes (born 24 July 1992) is a professional rugby union player who plays as a wing for Ealing Trailfinders in the RFU Championship. He scored two tries in six appearances for Wales before moving to Ealing, which effectively ended his international career. He currently plays for London Scottish.

== Early life ==
Holmes was born in Stockport, England. He played junior rugby for London Scottish until the age of 16 but then left to only play with his school St Benedict's School, Ealing where he was considered a star in the making.

== Professional career ==
Holmes initially played scrum-half, but during a loan spell with Henley Hawks, he switched to the back three, playing wing and full-back. At the suggestion of Lyn Jones, who was his coach during a brief spell at London Welsh, he concentrated solely on the back three.

In 2013 Holmes joined Leeds Carnegie, since renamed Yorkshire Carnegie, on loan from London Wasps. Holmes scored six tries in his first six games for the Yorkshire side. Holmes made the move permanent in the summer, as part of a swap deal with Glyn Hughes. On 23 December 2013, after scoring 22 tries in 34 games, signed a new long term deal with Yorkshire.

On 1 June 2017 it was announced that Holmes would join Leicester Tigers for the 2017–18 season. Holmes scored 10 tries in 11 games during the 2017/18 season and provided a Man of the Match performance against Northampton Saints at Twickenham in October 2018, he was called up to the Wales squad on 16 October 2018. He qualifies through his grandparents. Holmes made his international debut for Wales on 17 November 2018 against Tonga at the Millennium Stadium. Holmes left Leicester at the end of the 2019–20 season, a year before his contract was due to end to join the Dragons in Wales. On 20 September 2020, Holmes made his debut against Bristol Bears in a Challenge Cup quarter final defeat.

=== International tries ===
Try	Opponent	Location	Venue	Competition	Date	Result
1	Canada	Cardiff, Wales	Millennium Stadium	2021 Summer Internationals	3 July 2021	Win
2	Canada	Cardiff, Wales	Millennium Stadium	2021 Summer Internationals	3 July 2021	Win

== Personal life ==
Holmes is the nephew of Olympic gold medal-winning rower Andy Holmes and is a graduate in biomedical sciences from Birkbeck, University of London.
