= List of 2024–25 Top 14 transfers =

This is a list of player transfers involving Top 14 teams before or during the 2024–25 season. The list is of deals that are confirmed and are either from or to a rugby union team in the Top 14 during the 2023–24 season. It is not unknown for confirmed deals to be cancelled at a later date.

On 8 June 2024, Vannes defeated Grenoble 16–9 to win the 2023–24 Rugby Pro D2 season to be promoted to the Top 14 for the 2024–25 season. Whilst Oyonnax are relegated to the Pro D2 for the 2024–25 season.

== Bayonne ==
=== Players In ===
- (France) Baptiste Chouzenoux from (France) Racing 92
- (France) Lucas Martin from (France) Provence
- (France) Andy Bordelai from (France) Vannes
- (Fiji) Eneriko Buliruarua to (France) Perpignan
- (England) Alex Moon from (England) Northampton Saints
- (New Zealand) Veikoso Poloniati from (France) Racing 92
- (Samoa) Giovanni Habel-Küffer from (France) Stade Français Paris
- (England) Manu Tuilagi from (England) Sale Sharks
- (France) Joris Segonds from (France) Stade Français Paris
- (France) Baptiste Germain from (France) Toulouse

=== Players Out ===
- (France) Rémy Baget to (France) Castres
- (France) Matis Perchaud to (France) Bordeaux
- (France) Pierre Huguet to (France) Stade Français Paris
- (France) Thomas Ceyte to (France) Clermont
- (Uruguay) Manuel Leindekar to (France) Oyonnax
- (France) Yan Lestrade to (France) Grenoble
- (Georgia (country)) Konstantin Mikautadze to (France) Brive
- (Georgia (country)) Gela Aprasidze to (France) Perpignan
- (France) Thomas Dolhagaray to (France) Biarritz
- (Fiji) Kaminieli Rasaku to (France) Grenoble
- (Australia) Luke Morahan retired
- (France) Robin Dione to (France) Albi

== Bordeaux ==
=== Players In ===
- (Australia) Lachlan Swinton from (Australia) NSW Waratahs
- (France) Enzo Reybier from (France) Oyonnax
- (France) Matis Perchaud from (France) Bayonne
- (Ireland) Joey Carbery from (Ireland) Munster
- (South Africa) RJ van Rensburg from (Japan) Yokohama Canon Eagles
- (France) Temo Matiu from (France) Biarritz
- (Scotland) Jonny Gray from (England) Exeter Chiefs
- (France) Arthur Retière from (France) Toulouse

=== Players Out ===
- (Georgia (country)) Lekso Kaulashvili to (France) Pau
- (South Africa) Madosh Tambwe to (France) Montpellier
- (France) Clément Maynadier retired
- (France) Thomas Jolmès to (France) Pau
- (South Africa) Jandré Marais retired
- (Australia) Zack Holmes to (France) Oyonnax
- (France) Antoine Miquel to (France) Oyonnax
- (France) Yahnis El Mashouri to (France) Béziers
- (Australia) Kane Douglas to (France) La Rochelle
- (France) Tani Vili to (France) Vannes
- (France) Maël Moustin to (France) Montpellier

== Castres ==
=== Players In ===
- (France) Rémy Baget from (France) Bayonne
- (France) Guillaume Ducat from (France) Pau
- (France) Nicolas Corato from (France) Pau
- (Cameroon) Christian Ambadiang from (France) Nevers
- (England) Will Collier from (England) Harlequins
- (France) Paul Jedrasiak from (France) Clermont
- (Samoa) Izaiha Moore-Aiono from (England) Saracens
- (Georgia (country)) Luka Matkava from (Georgia (country)) Black Lion

=== Players Out ===
- (France) Martin Laveau retired
- (Wales) Henry Thomas to (Wales) Scarlets
- (France) Wilfrid Hounkpatin to (France) Montpellier
- (Fiji) Filipo Nakosi to (France) Vannes
- (Australia) Nick Champion de Crespigny to (Australia) Western Force
- (South Africa) Ryno Pieterse to (France) Grenoble
- (France) Wayan de Benedittis to (France) Lyon

== Clermont ==
=== Players In ===
- (Samoa) Michael Alaalatoa from (Ireland) Leinster
- (France) Thomas Ceyte from (France) Bayonne
- (Georgia (country)) Giorgi Akhaladze from (France) Béziers
- (France) Lucas Tauzin from (France) Toulouse
- (France) Kylan Hamdaoui from (France) Stade Français Paris
- (France) Sacha Lotrian from (France) Perpignan
- (Germany) Oskar Rixen from (France) Brive
- (France) Barnabé Massa from (France) Grenoble
- (France) Régis Montagne from (France) Grenoble

=== Players Out ===
- (France) Daniel Bibi Biziwu to (France) Pau
- (France) Giorgi Beria to (France) Perpignan
- (France) Jules Plisson to (France) Provence
- (France) Henzo Kiteau to (France) Brive
- (Australia) Caleb Timu to (France) Colomiers
- (France) Thomas Rozière to (France) Valence Romans
- (France) Yohan Beheregaray to (France) Biarritz
- (Argentina) Tomás Lavanini to (France) Lyon
- (France) Rabah Slimani to (Ireland) Leinster
- (France) Julien Hériteau to (France) Grenoble
- (France) Paul Jedrasiak to (France) Castres

== La Rochelle ==
=== Players In ===
- (Australia) Kane Douglas from (France) Bordeaux
- (Australia) Suliasi Vunivalu from (Australia) Queensland Reds

=== Players Out ===
- (France) Rémi Picquette to (France) Pau
- (France) Noe Della Schiava to (France) Perpignan
- (France) Yoan Tanga to (France) Stade Français Paris
- (South Africa) Raymond Rhule retired

== Lyon ==
=== Players In ===
- (Georgia (country)) Irakli Aptsiauri from (France) Grenoble
- (France) Théo Millet from (France) Oyonnax
- (France) Charlie Cassang from (France) Oyonnax
- (New Zealand) Jermaine Ainsley from (New Zealand) Highlanders
- (Georgia (country)) Beka Shvangiradze from (France) Aurillac
- (Fiji) Sam Matavesi from (England) Northampton Saints
- (Argentina) Tomás Lavanini from (France) Clermont
- (France) Steeve Blanc-Mappaz from (France) Grenoble
- (France) Cedate Gomes Sa from (France) Racing 92
- (France) Camille Chat from (France) Racing 92
- (France) Wayan de Benedittis from (France) Castres

=== Players Out ===
- (France) Demba Bamba to (France) Racing 92
- (France) Romain Taofifénua to (France) Racing 92
- (England) Joel Kpoku to (France) Pau
- (France) Paulo Tafili to (France) Oyonnax
- (South Africa) Thaakir Abrahams to (Ireland) Munster
- (France) Loann Goujon retired
- (France) Jean-Marc Doussain retired
- (Australia) Joe Powell to (France) Montauban
- (Samoa) Jordan Taufua to (France) Stade Niçois
- (France) Vivien Devisme to (France) Soyaux Angoulême
- (France) Lucas-Antonin Agostini to (France) Aurillac
- (France) Paul Dumas to (France) Valence Romans
- (France) Xavier Mignot to (United States) New Orleans Gold
- (Tonga) Feao Fotuaika to (Australia) Brumbies

== Montpellier ==
=== Players In ===
- (France) Alexis Bernadet from (France) Montauban
- (South Africa) Madosh Tambwe from (France) Bordeaux
- (Portugal) Nicolas Martins from (France) Soyaux Angoulême
- (New Zealand) Josh Moorby from (New Zealand) Highlanders
- (France) Mohamed Haouas from (France) Biarritz
- (France) Wilfrid Hounkpatin from (France) Castres
- (Argentina) Domingo Miotti from (France) Oyonnax
- (France) Thomas Vincent from (France) Agen
- (France) Maël Moustin from (France) Bordeaux
- (Fiji) Christa Powell from (France) Aurillac
- (Georgia (country)) Nika Abuladze from (England) Exeter Chiefs
- (Scotland) Stuart Hogg unattached
- (England) Billy Vunipola from (England) Saracens
- (Australia) Jordan Uelese from (Australia) Melbourne Rebels

=== Players Out ===
- (France) Louis Foursans-Bourdette to (France) Stade Français Paris
- (Australia) Brandon Paenga-Amosa to (Australia) Western Force
- (France) Clément Doumenc to (France) Béziers
- (Samoa) Titi Lamositele to (England) Harlequins
- (France) Louis Carbonel to (France) Stade Français Paris
- (France) Geoffrey Doumayrou retired
- (Georgia (country)) Lasha Macharashvili to (France) Agen
- (Fiji) Masivesi Dakuwaqa to (France) Biarritz
- (France) Grégory Fichten to (France) Narbonne
- (England) Harry Williams to (France) Pau
- (Samoa) Ben Lam to (France) Catalan Dragons
- (Fiji) Christa Powell to (France) Stade Niçois

== Pau ==
=== Players In ===
- (France) Daniel Bibi Biziwu from (France) Clermont
- (Georgia (country)) Lekso Kaulashvili from (France) Bordeaux
- (France) Loïc Crédoz from (France) Oyonnax
- (France) Aymeric Luc from (France) Toulon
- (England) Joel Kpoku from (France) Lyon
- (Spain) Jon Zabala from (France) Béziers
- (France) Rémi Picquette from (France) La Rochelle
- (France) Olivier Klemenczak from (France) Racing 92
- (France) Aaron Grandidier from (France) Brive
- (France) Thomas Jolmès from (France) Bordeaux
- (England) Harry Williams from (France) Montpellier
- (New Zealand) Tom Franklin from (Australia) Western Force
- (South Africa) Dan Jooste from (South Africa) Sharks
- (Wales) Carwyn Tuipulotu from (Wales) Scarlets

=== Players Out ===
- (Spain) Samuel Ezeala to (France) Stade Français Paris
- (France) Guillaume Ducat to (France) Castres
- (Fiji) Aminiasi Tuimaba to (France) Béziers
- (France) Nicolas Corato to (France) Castres
- (New Zealand) Sam Whitelock retired
- (Australia) Steve Cummins to (Wales) Dragons
- (Fiji) Jale Vatubua to (France) Dax
- (France) Paul Tailhades to (France) Soyaux Angoulême
- (France) Fabrice Metz to (France) Vannes
- (Tonga) Siegfried Fisi'ihoi to (France) Massy
- (France) Simon-Pierre Chauvac to (France) Brive
- (Argentina) Facundo Gigena to (France) Stade Niçois

== Perpignan ==
=== Players In ===
- (France) Giorgi Beria from (France) Clermont
- (Fiji) Eneriko Buliruarua from (France) Bayonne
- (England) Kieran Brookes from (France) Toulon
- (France) Noe Della Schiava from (France) La Rochelle
- (France) Antoine Aucagne from (France) Aurillac
- (France) Bruce Devaux from (France) Toulon
- (Georgia (country)) Gela Aprasidze from (France) Bayonne
- (France) Adrien Warion from (France) Toulon
- (South Africa) James Hall from (France) Racing 92
- (New Zealand) Max Hicks from (New Zealand) Highlanders

=== Players Out ===
- (France) Sacha Lotrian to (France) Clermont
- (Fiji) Eddie Sawailau to (France) Oyonnax
- (France) Ewan Bertheau to (France) Mont-de-Marsan
- (France) Matteo Rodor to (France) Valence Romans
- (France) Arthur Joly to (France) Layrac
- (Fiji) Taniela Ramasibana to (England) Doncaster Knights
- (France) Xavier Chiocci from (France) XV du Coudon
- (France) Mathieu Acebe to (France) Biarritz
- (France) Boris Goutard to (France) Narbonne
- (France) Victor Moreaux to (France) Montauban
- (Cook Islands) Shahn Eru retired
- (Tonga) Afusipa Taumoepeau to (France) Oyonnax

== Racing 92 ==
=== Players In ===
- (France) Demba Bamba from (France) Lyon
- (France) Romain Taofifénua from (France) Lyon
- (Chile) Diego Escobar from (Chile) Selknam
- (France) Pierre Huguet from (France) Bayonne
- (England) Owen Farrell from (England) Saracens
- (England) Sam James from (England) Sale Sharks
- (England) Dan Lancaster from (England) Ealing Trailfinders
- (South Africa) Hacjivah Dayimani from (South Africa) Stormers
- (Argentina) Lucio Sordoni from (Scotland) Glasgow Warriors
- (South Africa) Lee-Marvin Mazibuko from (South Africa) Stormers
- (Australia) Feleti Kaitu'u from (Australia) Western Force

=== Players Out ===
- (France) Baptiste Chouzenoux to (France) Bayonne
- (New Zealand) Veikoso Poloniati to (France) Bayonne
- (France) Olivier Klemenczak to (France) Pau
- (South Africa) Trevor Nyakane to (South Africa) Sharks
- (England) Christian Wade to (England) Gloucester
- (Fiji) Peniami Narisia to (France) Oyonnax
- (France) Cedate Gomes Sa to (France) Lyon
- (South Africa) James Hall to (France) Perpignan
- (France) Wenceslas Lauret retired
- (New Zealand) Francis Saili to (France) Vannes
- (Fiji) Kitione Kamikamica to (France) Vannes
- (Fiji) Inia Tabuavou to (Fiji) Fijian Drua
- (South Africa) Siya Kolisi to (South Africa) Sharks
- (France) Camille Chat to (France) Lyon
- (Argentina) Lucio Sordoni to (France) Montauban

== Stade Français ==
=== Players In ===
- (South Africa) Joe Jonas from (France) Biarritz
- (Spain) Samuel Ezeala from (France) Pau
- (France) Louis Foursans-Bourdette from (France) Montpellier
- (France) Yoan Tanga from (France) La Rochelle
- (France) Louis Carbonel from (France) Montpellier
- (Italy) Giacomo Nicotera from (Italy) Benetton

=== Players Out ===
- (Samoa) Giovanni Habel-Kuffer to (France) Bayonne
- (France) Mathieu de Giovanni to (France) Agen
- (France) Joris Segonds to (France) Bayonne
- (France) Kylan Hamdaoui to (France) Clermont
- (France) Mickaël Ivaldi to (France) Toulon
- (France) Laurent Panis retired
- (Georgia (country)) Vasil Kakovin to (Georgia (country)) Black Lion
- (Georgia (country)) Giorgi Tsutskiridze to (Georgia (country)) Black Lion
- (Australia) Sefa Naivalu to (France) Carcassonne
- (Fiji) Jeneiro Wakeham to (England) Ealing Trailfinders

== Toulon ==
=== Players In ===
- (England) Lewis Ludlam from (England) Northampton Saints
- (England) Kyle Sinckler from (England) Bristol Bears
- (France) Antoine Frisch from (Ireland) Munster
- (France) Mickaël Ivaldi from (France) Stade Français Paris
- (France) Daniel Brennan from (France) Brive
- (France) Pablo Patilla from (France) Rouen
- (Italy) Gianmarco Lucchesi from (Italy) Benetton
- (England) Finn Newton from (England) Saracens

=== Players Out ===
- (England) Kieran Brookes to (France) Perpignan
- (France) Aymeric Luc to (France) Pau
- (France) Bruce Devaux to (France) Perpignan
- (Fiji) Waisea Nayacalevu to (England) Sale Sharks
- (France) Adrien Warion to (France) Perpignan
- (France) Maëlan Rabut to (France) Oyonnax
- (France) Anthony Etrillard retired
- (Scotland) Cornell du Preez to (France) Biarritz
- (France) Fabio Gonzalez to (France) Stade Niçois

== Toulouse ==
=== Players In ===
- (Japan) Naoto Saito from (Japan) Tokyo Sungoliath
- (France) Léo Banos from (France) Mont-de-Marsan
- (France) Hugo Reilhes from (France) Brive

=== Players Out ===
- (France) Lucas Tauzin to (France) Clermont
- (France) Maxime Duprat retired
- (France) Clément Sentubéry to (France) Soyaux Angoulême
- (Samoa) Piula Fa'asalele to (France) Biarritz
- (France) Baptiste Germain to (France) Bayonne
- (France) Sofiane Guitoune retired
- (France) Arthur Retière to (France) Bordeaux

== Vannes ==
=== Players In ===
- (France) Fabrice Metz from (France) Pau
- (South Africa) Christiaan van der Merwe from (France) Nevers
- (France) Hugo Djehi from (France) Colomiers
- (England) Mako Vunipola from (England) Saracens
- (Fiji) Filipo Nakosi from (France) Castres
- (France) Tani Vili from (France) Bordeaux
- (Chile) Iñaki Ayarza from (France) Soyaux Angoulême
- (New Zealand) Francis Saili from (France) Racing 92
- (New Zealand) Salesi Rayasi from (New Zealand) Hurricanes
- (Argentina) Santiago Medrano from (Australia) Western Force
- (Fiji) Kitione Kamikamica from (France) Racing 92
- (France) Simon Augry from (France) Biarritz
- (Italy) Stephen Varney from (England) Gloucester
- (Australia) John Porch from (Ireland) Connacht

=== Players Out ===
- (France) Andy Bordelai to (France) Bayonne
- (Ireland) Darren O'Shea to (France) Valence Romans
- (France) Gregoire Bazin to (France) Colomiers
- (Netherlands) Koen Bloemen to (France) Aurillac
- (Spain) Ximun Bessonart to (France) Tarbes
- (France) Jeremy Boyadjis to (France) Narbonne
- (France) Arthur Proult to (France) Soyaux Angoulême
- (France) Sacha Valleau retired

== See also ==
- List of 2024–25 Premiership Rugby transfers
- List of 2024–25 United Rugby Championship transfers
- List of 2024–25 Super Rugby transfers
- List of 2024–25 RFU Championship transfers
- List of 2024–25 Rugby Pro D2 transfers
- List of 2024–25 Major League Rugby transfers
