= List of 2018–19 Top 14 transfers =

This is a list of player transfers involving Top 14 teams before or during the 2018–19 season. The list is of deals that are confirmed and are either from or to a rugby union team in the Top 14 during the 2017–18 season. It is not unknown for confirmed deals to be cancelled at a later date. Perpignan and Grenoble are promoted to the Top 14, whilst both Brive and Oyonnax are relegated to the Pro D2 for the 2018–19 season.

== Agen ==
=== Players In ===
- (France) Romain Briatte from (France) Aurillac
- (France) Xerom Civil from (France) Carcassonne
- (Fiji) Timilai Rokoduru from (France) Angoulême
- (Romania) Adrian Motoc from (France) Racing 92
- (France) Yohan Montes from (France) Castres
- (Fiji) Timilai Rokoduru from (France) Angoulême
- (France) Leo Berdeu from (France) Lyon
- (Colombia) Andres Zafra from (France) Lyon
- (France) Fouad Yaha from (France) Catalans Dragons
- (Fiji) Benito Masilevu from (France) Brive

=== Players Out ===
- (Fiji) Filipo Nakosi to (France) Toulon
- (France) Antoine Erbani to (France) Pau
- (France) Pierre Fouyssac to (France) Toulouse
- (Georgia (country)) Vakhtang Akhobadze to (France) Biarritz
- (New Zealand) George Tilsley to (France) Bordeaux
- (France) Arthur Joly to (France) La Rochelle
- (France) Corentine Braedin to (France) Montauban
- (France) Loick Jammes to (France) Brive
- (France) Jeremy Russell to (France) Albi
- (Italy) Leandro Cedaro to (France) Mont-de-Marsan
- (France) Lucas Tolot to (France) Nerac
- (France) Florian Denos to (France) Ceret
- (Argentina) Ignacio Mieres to (France) Marmande
- (Fiji) Akapusi Qera to (England) Hartpury College

== Bordeaux ==
=== Players In ===
- (Georgia (country)) Beka Gorgadze from (France) Mont-de-Marsan
- (France) Nicolas Plazy from (France) Colomiers
- (France) Romain Buros from (France) Pau
- (Georgia (country)) Lekso Kaulashvili from (France) La Rochelle
- (Fiji) Peceli Nacebe from (Fiji) Fijian Drua
- (New Zealand) Seta Tamanivalu from (New Zealand) Crusaders
- (Fiji) Semi Radradra from (France) Toulon
- (New Zealand) Brock James from (France) La Rochelle
- (New Zealand) George Tilsley from (France) Agen
- (Australia) Eto Nabuli from (Australia) Queensland Reds
- (Australia) Kane Douglas from (Australia) Queensland Reds
- (Australia) UJ Seuteni from (France) Oyonnax
- (Australia) Afa Amosa from (France) La Rochelle
- (France) Laurent Delboubes from (France) Toulon
- (Samoa) Viliamu Afatia from (France) Racing 92
- (Fiji) Tevita Ratuva from (Australia) Brisbane City
- (Argentina) Mariano Galarza from (England) Gloucester

=== Players Out ===
- (France) Sébastien Taofifénua to (France) Toulon
- (New Zealand) Simon Hickey to (Scotland) Edinburgh
- (France) Johan Aliouat to (France) Biarritz
- (France) Jean-Baptiste Poux retired
- (France) Loann Goujon to (France) Lyon
- (New Zealand) Hugh Chalmers to (France) Vannes
- (Samoa) Ed Fidow to (France) Provence
- (France) Marc Clerc to (France) Castres
- (New Zealand) Jayden Spence retired
- (Fiji) Apisai Naqalevu to (France) Clermont
- (Fiji) Metuisela Talebula to (France) Bayonne
- (France) Tom Juniver to (France) Massy
- (Fiji) Ben Volavola to (France) Racing 92
- (France) Pierre Gayraud to (France) Toulouse
- (South Africa) Tian Schoeman to (South Africa) Cheetahs
- (France) Gauthier Doubrere to (France) Biarritz
- (New Zealand) Fa'asiu Fuatai to (New Zealand) Bay of Plenty

== Castres ==
=== Players In ===
- (France) Yann David from (France) Toulouse
- (Tonga) Paea Faʻanunu from (France) Dax
- (France) Wilfred Hounkpatin from (France) Rouen
- (France) Martin Laveau from (France) Bayonne
- (Tonga) Tapu Falatea from (France) Narbonne
- (France) Kevin Gimeno from (France) Carcassonne
- (France) Marc Clerc from (France) Bordeaux
- (France) Scott Spedding from (France) Clermont
- (France) Camille Gerondeau from (France) Clermont

=== Players Out ===
- (Germany) Damien Tussac retired
- (France) Kylan Jaminet to (France) Colomiers
- (France) Yohan Montes to (France) Agen
- (New Zealand) Eric Sione to (France) Perpignan
- (Australia) Afusipa Taumoepeau to (France) Perpignan
- (France) Pierre Berard to (France) Beziers
- (France) Jordan Ladhuie to (France) Carcassonne
- (France) Alexandre Bias retired
- (Romania) Mihai Lazăr to (France) Grenoble

== Clermont ==
=== Players In ===
- (Samoa) Tim Nanai-Williams from (New Zealand) Chiefs
- (New Zealand) George Moala from (New Zealand) Blues
- (Fiji) Apisai Naqalevu from (France) Bordeaux

=== Players Out ===
- (France) Raphaël Chaume to (France) Lyon
- (France) Noa Nakaitaci to (France) Lyon
- (France) Aurélien Rougerie retired
- (Australia) Malietoa Hingano to (France) Stade Français Paris
- (England) David Strettle to (England) Saracens
- (France) Alexandre Nicoue to (France) Biarritz
- (Wales) Aaron Jarvis to (Wales) Dragons
- (France) Atila Septar to (France) Pau
- (France) Scott Spedding to (France) Castres
- (Georgia (country)) Otar Giorgadze to (France) Brive
- (France) Camille Gerondeau to (France) Castres

== Grenoble ==
=== Players In ===
- (France) Clement Ancely from (France) Massy
- (France) Steeve Blanc-Mappaz from (France) Vannes
- (Australia) Junior Rasolea from (Scotland) Edinburgh
- (New Zealand) Taleta Tupuola from (France) Montauban
- (France) Theo Nanette from (France) Aurillac
- (Samoa) Taiasina Tuifu'a from (France) Lyon
- (France) Gaëtan Germain from (France) Brive
- (Tonga) Halani Aulika from (England) Sale Sharks
- (France) Pablo Uberti from (France) Bordeaux
- (Portugal) Mike Tadjer from (France) Brive
- (South Africa) JC Janse van Rensburg from (South Africa) Stormers
- (Georgia (country)) Davit Kubriashvili from (France) Montpellier
- (South Africa) Raymond Rhule from (South Africa) Stormers
- (Australia) Ben Lucas from (Australia) Queensland Reds
- (Romania) Mihai Lazăr from (France) Castres

=== Players Out ===
- (France) David Mele to (France) Perpignan
- (England) Aly Muldowney to (England) Bristol Bears
- (New Zealand) Dylan Hayes to (France) Angoulême
- (Fiji) Eddie Sawailau to (France) Perpignan
- (France) Benoit Jasmin to (France) Carcassonne
- (France) Axel Paramelles to (France) Nevers
- (Tonga) Alaska Taufa to (France) Valence Romans Drome
- (France) Paulin Mas to (France) Chambéry
- (France) Pierre Maïau to (France) Vannes
- (New Zealand) Taiso Silafai-Leaana to (France) Valence Romans Drome
- (Tonga) Sona Taumalolo retired
- (France) Arnaud Heguy to (France) Dax

== La Rochelle ==
=== Players In ===
- (France) Maxime Lafage from (France) Colomiers
- (New Zealand) Ihaia West from (New Zealand) Hurricanes
- (France) Arthur Joly from (France) Agen
- (France) Brieuc Plessis Couillard from (France) Narbonne
- (France) Marc Andreu from (France) Racing 92
- (France) Remi Bourdeau from (France) Beziers
- (Tonga) Sila Puafisi from (France) Brive
- (Australia) Lopeti Timani from (Australia) Melbourne Rebels

=== Players Out ===
- (Tonga) David Feao to (France) Narbonne
- (Georgia (country)) Lekso Kaulashvili to (France) Bordeaux
- (New Zealand) Brock James to (France) Bordeaux
- (France) Jérémie Maurouard to (France) Lyon
- (Australia) Afa Amosa to (France) Bordeaux
- (France) Charles Bouldoire to (France) Biarritz
- (New Zealand) Jason Eaton retired
- (France) Luc Mousset to (France) Bayonne
- (France) Gregory Lamboley retired
- (New Zealand) Rene Ranger to (New Zealand) Northland

== Lyon ==
=== Players In ===
- (France) Raphaël Chaume from (France) Clermont
- (France) Noa Nakaitaci from (France) Clermont
- (France) Patrick Sobela from (France) Oyonnax
- (France) Jean-Marc Doussain from (France) Toulouse
- (New Zealand) Charlie Ngatai from (New Zealand) Chiefs
- (France) Jérémie Maurouard from (France) La Rochelle
- (France) Jonathan Wisniewski from (France) Toulon
- (France) Loann Goujon from (France) Bordeaux
- (Argentina) Manuel Carizza from (France) Racing 92
- (Georgia (country)) Badri Alkhazashvili from (France) Toulon

=== Players Out ===
- (France) Stéphane Clément to (France) Stade Français Paris
- (France) Frédéric Michalak retired
- (France) David Attoub retired
- (Australia) Mike Harris to (Japan) Toshiba Brave Lupus
- (Georgia (country)) Tornike Mataradze to (France) Nevers
- (Georgia (country)) Guram Papidze to (France) Nevers
- (Tonga) Tanginoa Halaifonua to (France) Massy
- (France) Theophile Cotte to (France) Nevers
- (Tonga) Hemani Paea retired
- (France) Leo Berdeu to (France) Agen
- (Samoa) Taiasina Tuifu'a to (France) Grenoble
- (Colombia) Andres Zafra to (France) Agen
- (France) Theo Belan to (France) Toulouse
- (New Zealand) Josh Bekhuis to (Japan) Honda Heat

== Montpellier ==
=== Players In ===
- (South Africa) Johan Goosen from (South Africa) Cheetahs
- (France) Julien Le Devedec from (France) Brive
- (Georgia (country)) Levan Chilachava from (France) Toulon
- (France) Julien Tomas from (France) Pau

=== Players Out ===
- (France) Julien Delannoy to (France) Pau
- (France) Joffrey Michel to (France) Oyonnax
- (Georgia (country)) Davit Kubriashvili to (France) Grenoble
- (Australia) Jesse Mogg to (France) Pau
- (Australia) Joe Tomane to (Ireland) Leinster
- (France) Charles Geli retired

== Pau ==
=== Players In ===
- (France) Julien Blanc from (France) Béziers
- (France) Dan Malafosse from (France) Mont-de-Marsan
- (France) Antoine Erbani from (France) Agen
- (France) Julien Delannoy from (France) Montpellier
- (France) Atila Septar from (France) Clermont
- (Australia) Jesse Mogg from (France) Montpellier

=== Players Out ===
- (New Zealand) Conrad Smith retired
- (France) Romain Buros to (France) Bordeaux
- (France) Sylvain Charlet to (France) Perpignan
- (France) Julien Pierre retired
- (France) Thomas Bianchin retired
- (France) Brandon Fajardo to (France) Colomiers
- (Samoa) Masalosalo Tutaia to (France) Perpignan
- (France) Julien Tomas to (France) Montpellier

== Perpignan ==
=== Players In ===
- (France) David Mele from (France) Grenoble
- (France) Sylvain Charlet from (France) Pau
- (South Africa) Wandile Mjekevu from (France) Toulouse
- (Romania) Johan van Heerden from (Romania) Baia Mare
- (Fiji) Eddie Sawailau from (France) Grenoble
- (New Zealand) Eric Sione from (France) Castres
- (Samoa) Manu Leiataua from (France) Bayonne
- (Samoa) Masalosalo Tutaia from (France) Pau
- (Fiji) Eroni Sau from (Fiji) Fijian Drua
- (France) Cyril Deligny from (France) Narbonne
- (Australia) Afusipa Taumoepeau from (France) Castres
- (Ireland) Paddy Jackson from (Ireland) Ulster

=== Players Out ===
- (France) Christophe Andre to (France) Provence
- (France) Yann De Fauverge retired
- (Wales) Joe Jones to (England) Sale Sharks
- (Tonga) Michael Faleafa to (France) Provence
- (South Africa) Jacques-Louis Potgieter retired
- (Scotland) Alasdair Strokosch retired
- (Tonga) Lifeimi Mafi retired
- (Tonga) Tevita Mailau retired
- (France) Frederic Gendre to (France) Dijon
- (France) Mathieu Majeau to (France) Dijon
- (Belgium) Jens Torfs to (France) Mont-de-Marsan
- (France) Thibault Dufau to (France) Dijon
- (France) Samuel Faconnier to (France) Ceret
- (Argentina) Martin Garcia Veiga to (Spain) FC Barcelona

== Racing 92 ==
=== Players In ===
- (Scotland) Finn Russell from (Scotland) Glasgow Warriors
- (France) Olivier Klemenczak from (France) Dax
- (Ireland) Simon Zebo from (Ireland) Munster
- (France) Fabien Sanconnie from (France) Brive
- (France) Raphael Lagarde from (France) Bayonne
- (Fiji) Ben Volavola from (France) Bordeaux
- (New Zealand) Dominic Bird from (New Zealand) Chiefs

=== Players Out ===
- (New Zealand) Dan Carter to (Japan) Kobelco Steelers
- (France) Remi Tales to (France) Mont-de-Marsan
- (Romania) Adrian Motoc to (France) Agen
- (France) Benjamin Dambielle retired
- (France) Yannick Nyanga retired
- (France) Marc Andreu to (France) La Rochelle
- (Samoa) Viliamu Afatia to (France) Bordeaux
- (Fiji) Albert Vulivuli to (France) Vannes
- (England) Matt Worley to (England) Northampton Saints
- (Argentina) Patricio Albacete retired
- (New Zealand) Casey Laulala retired
- (Samoa) So'otala Fa'aso'o to (France) Brive
- (Argentina) Manuel Carizza to (France) Lyon

== Stade Français ==
=== Players In ===
- (France) Kylan Hamdaoui from (France) Biarritz
- (France) Lester Etien from (France) Massy
- (France) Stéphane Clément from (France) Lyon
- (Australia) Tala Gray from (France) Toulouse
- (Australia) Malietoa Hingano from (France) Clermont
- (France) Alex Arrate from (France) Biarritz
- (Tonga) Siegfried Fisiihoi from (New Zealand) Chiefs
- (Argentina) Nicolás Sánchez from (Argentina) Jaguares
- (South Africa) Piet van Zyl from (England) London Irish
- (France) Yoann Maestri from (France) Toulouse
- (France) Gaël Fickou from (France) Toulouse
- (Tonga) Atunaisa Manu from (Italy) Viadana

=== Players Out ===
- (Samoa) Brandon Nansen to (Wales) Dragons
- (South Africa) Meyer Bosman retired
- (Samoa) Paul Williams retired
- (France) Steevy Cerqueira to (France) Brive
- (Samoa) Sakaria Taulafo to (France) Ceret
- (Georgia (country)) Zurab Zhvania to (England) Wasps
- (France) Maxime Gau to (France) Massy
- (France) Marvin Woki to (France) Montauban
- (Ivory Coast) Bakary Meite to (France) Carcassonne
- Terry Bouhraoua to France Sevens
- Marvin O'Connor to France Sevens
- (Belgium) Jean Baptiste de Clercq to (France) Oloron

== Toulon ==
=== Players In ===
- (Fiji) Filipo Nakosi from (France) Agen
- (Wales) Rhys Webb from (Wales) Ospreys
- (France) Sébastien Taofifénua from (France) Bordeaux
- (New Zealand) Liam Messam from (New Zealand) Chiefs
- (France) Stéphane Onambélé from (France) Colomiers
- (South Africa) Jacques Potgieter from (Japan) Munakata Sanix Blues
- (France) Daniel Ikpefan from (France) Oyonnax
- (New Zealand) Julian Savea from (New Zealand) Hurricanes
- (Tonga) Brian Alainu'uese from (Scotland) Glasgow Warriors

=== Players Out ===
- (Argentina) Juan Martín Fernández Lobbe retired
- (Italy) Edoardo Padovani to (Italy) Zebre
- (Fiji) Semi Radradra to (France) Bordeaux
- (France) Jocelino Suta retired
- (France) Laurent Delboubes to (France) Bordeaux
- (France) Jonathan Wisniewski to (France) Lyon
- (France) Vincent Clerc retired
- (South Africa) Bryan Habana retired
- (France) Sebastian Tillous-Borde retired
- (Georgia (country)) Levan Chilachava to (France) Montpellier
- (South Africa) Duane Vermeulen to (Japan) Kubota Spears
- (England) Chris Ashton to (England) Sale Sharks
- (United States) Samu Manoa to (Wales) Cardiff Blues
- (New Zealand) Alby Mathewson to (Ireland) Munster (short-term deal)
- (New Zealand) Ma'a Nonu to (New Zealand) Blues
- (Georgia (country)) Badri Alkhazashvili to (France) Lyon

== Toulouse ==
=== Players In ===
- (France) Pierre Fouyssac from (France) Agen
- (France) Alban Placines from (France) Biarritz
- (New Zealand) Jerome Kaino from (New Zealand) Blues
- (New Zealand) Pita Ahki from (Ireland) Connacht
- (France) Theo Belan from (France) Lyon
- (France) Pierre Gayraud from (France) Bordeaux
- (France) Maxime Mermoz from (England) Newcastle Falcons
- (France) Pierre Pages from (France) Blagnac

=== Players Out ===
- (France) Yann David to (France) Castres
- (France) Jean-Marc Doussain to (France) Lyon
- (Australia) Tala Gray to (France) Stade Français Paris
- (South Africa) Wandile Mjekevu to (France) Perpignan
- (France) Florian Fritz retired
- (France) David Roumieu retired
- (France) Yoann Maestri to (France) Stade Français Paris
- (France) Gaël Fickou to (France) Stade Français Paris
- (South Africa) Danie Mienie to (South Africa) Lions
- (Fiji) Semi Kunatani to (England) Harlequins

== See also ==
- List of 2018–19 Premiership Rugby transfers
- List of 2018–19 Pro14 transfers
- List of 2018–19 Super Rugby transfers
- List of 2018–19 RFU Championship transfers
- List of 2018-19 Major League Rugby transfers
