= Autumn Nations Cup =

Unique rugby union competition

- Date: 13 November – 6 December 2020
- Countries: England; Fiji; France; Georgia; Ireland; Italy; Scotland; Wales

Final positions
- Champions: England
- Runner-up: France
- Third place: Ireland
- Fourth place: Scotland

Tournament statistics
- Matches played: 13
- Tries scored: 53 (4.08 per match)
- Top scorer(s): (England) Owen Farrell (46)
- Most tries: (England) Jamie George (Fiji) Nemani Nadolo (3)
- Player of the tournament: (France) Brice Dulin

The Autumn Nations Cup was a rugby union competition held in November and December 2020 in place of the usual Autumn internationals series typically held in the same period each year, as many teams were avoiding extended travel due to the COVID-19 pandemic. Eight teams participated – the teams involved in the Six Nations Championship (England, France, Ireland, Italy, Scotland, and Wales) plus Georgia and Fiji – divided into two groups of four. Japan were originally going to take part but withdrew due to travel restrictions, resulting in them being replaced by Georgia and moving Fiji to Group B.

Each team played the others in its group once to determine the final group standings; the teams in first place in each group then played each other, as did the teams in second, third, and fourth, to determine the overall standings. The tournament opened with a match between Ireland and Wales at the Aviva Stadium on 13 November 2020, and the final matches were hosted by the teams from Group A on the weekend of 5/6 December 2020 (Georgia's "home" match was played at Murrayfield Stadium in Edinburgh, Scotland). Wales' home matches were played at Parc y Scarlets due to the Millennium Stadium being decommissioned as a COVID-19 hospital. Fiji were forced to concede all of their group games due to a COVID-19 outbreak in their team camp, but they were able to face Georgia in the 7th/8th-place playoff.

England won the tournament after wins over Ireland, Wales, Georgia, and France.

== Overview ==
=== Participants ===
World Rugby rankings denoted in (parentheses) as per start of the tournament

Nation	Head coach	Captain
England (3)	(Australia) Eddie Jones	Owen Farrell
Fiji (11)	(New Zealand) Vern Cotter	Semi Radradra
France (4)	(France) Fabien Galthié	Charles Ollivon
Georgia (12)	(Georgia (country)) Levan Maisashvili	Merab Sharikadze
Ireland (5)	(England) Andy Farrell	Johnny Sexton
Italy (14)	(South Africa) Franco Smith	Luca Bigi
Scotland (7)	(Scotland) Gregor Townsend	Stuart Hogg
Wales (8)	(New Zealand) Wayne Pivac	Alun Wyn Jones

=== Venues ===
Stadium	Capacity	Location
(England) Twickenham Stadium	82,000	London
Stade de France	80,698	Saint-Denis
(France) Stade de la Rabine (Note: Originally scheduled to host cancelled match against Fiji)	9,500	Vannes
(Ireland) Aviva Stadium	51,700	Dublin
(Scotland) Murrayfield Stadium	67,144	Edinburgh
(Italy) Stadio Artemio Franchi	43,147	Florence
(Italy) Stadio del Conero	23,967	Ancona
(Wales) Parc y Scarlets	14,870	Llanelli

== Fixtures ==
=== Group A ===
Position	Nation	Games				Points			Tries		Bonus points		Table points
Position	Nation	Pld	W	D	L	PF	PA	PD	TF	TA	Tries	Loser	Table points
1	England	3	3	0	0	82	20	+62	10	2	1	0	13
2	Ireland	3	2	0	1	62	37	+25	5	3	0	0	8
3	Wales	3	1	0	2	40	56	–16	3	4	0	0	4
4	Georgia	3	0	0	3	10	81	–71	1	10	0	0	0

==== Round 1 ====
13 November 2020
19:00 WET (UTC+0)

Ireland	32–9	Wales
Try: Roux 23' c Lowe 80+1' c Con: Sexton (1/1) 24'; Murray (1/1) 80+2'; Pen: Sexton (2/2) 10', 28'; Burns (2/2) 36', 54'; Murray (2/2) 67', 72'	Report	Pen: Halfpenny (3/5) 17', 31', 50'

Aviva Stadium, Dublin
Attendance: 0
Referee: Mathieu Raynal (France)

Team details

FB	15	Hugo Keenan
RW	14	Andrew Conway
OC	13	Chris Farrell
IC	12	Robbie Henshaw	(substituted off) 71'
LW	11	James Lowe
FH	10	Johnny Sexton (c)	(substituted off) 29'
SH	9	Jamison Gibson-Park
N8	8	Caelan Doris
OF	7	Josh van der Flier	(substituted off) 70'
BF	6	Peter O'Mahony
RL	5	James Ryan
LL	4	Quinn Roux	(substituted off) 65'
TP	3	Andrew Porter	(substituted off) 65'
HK	2	Rónan Kelleher	(substituted off) 65'
LP	1	Cian Healy	(substituted off) 60'
Replacements:
HK	16	Dave Heffernan	(substituted in) 65'
PR	17	Ed Byrne	(substituted in) 60'
PR	18	Finlay Bealham	(substituted in) 65'
LK	19	Tadhg Beirne	(substituted in) 65'
FL	20	Will Connors	(substituted in) 70'
SH	21	Conor Murray		(substituted in) 65'
FH	22	Billy Burns	(substituted in) 29'	(substituted off) 65'
WG	23	Keith Earls	(substituted in) 71'
Coach:
Andy Farrell

FB	15	Leigh Halfpenny
RW	14	Liam Williams
OC	13	Jonathan Davies	(substituted off) 60'
IC	12	Owen Watkin
LW	11	Josh Adams
FH	10	Dan Biggar	(substituted off) 67'
SH	9	Gareth Davies	(substituted off) 54'
N8	8	Taulupe Faletau	(substituted off) 71'
OF	7	Justin Tipuric
BF	6	Shane Lewis-Hughes
RL	5	Alun Wyn Jones (c)		(substituted off) 79'
LL	4	Will Rowlands	(substituted off) 52'	(substituted in) 79'
TP	3	Tomas Francis	(substituted off) 52'
HK	2	Ryan Elias	(substituted off) 52'
LP	1	Rhys Carré	(substituted off) 40'
Replacements:
HK	16	Elliot Dee	(substituted in) 52'
PR	17	Wyn Jones	(substituted in) 40'
PR	18	Samson Lee	(substituted in) 52'
LK	19	Jake Ball	(substituted in) 52'
FL	20	Aaron Wainwright	(substituted in) 71'
SH	21	Lloyd Williams	(substituted in) 54'
FH	22	Callum Sheedy	(substituted in) 67'
WG	23	George North	(substituted in) 60'
Coach:
Wayne Pivac

Player of the Match:
Caelan Doris (Ireland)

Assistant referees:
Pascal Gaüzère (France)
Alexandre Ruiz (France)
Television match official:
Romain Poite (France)

Notes:

- Jacob Stockdale and Iain Henderson were named to start but were ruled out on matchday and replaced by Quinn Roux and Andrew Conway; Tadhg Beirne was added to the bench.
- Billy Burns and James Lowe (both Ireland) and Callum Sheedy (Wales) made their international debuts.
- Tomas Francis (Wales) earned his 50th test cap.
- George North became the seventh Wales player to earn 100 test caps (97 for Wales, 3 for the British and Irish Lions). He also became the youngest player to earn his 100th cap at 28 years and 225 days, surpassing Australia's Michael Hooper's record of 28 years and 348 days.
- Johnny Sexton became the seventh Ireland player to earn 100 test caps (94 for Ireland, 6 for the British and Irish Lions).
- Alun Wyn Jones became the first player to earn 150 test caps (141 for Wales, 9 for the British and Irish Lions).

14 November 2020
15:00 GMT (UTC+0)

(1 BP) England	40–0	Georgia
Try: Willis 15' c George (3) 30' c, 34' m, 58' c Daly 38' c Robson 69' c Con: Farrell (5/6) 17', 31', 39', 59', 70'	Report

Twickenham Stadium, London
Attendance: 0
Referee: Nigel Owens (Wales)

Team details

FB	15	Elliot Daly
RW	14	Jonathan Joseph	(substituted off) 39'
OC	13	Ollie Lawrence	(substituted off) 62'
IC	12	Henry Slade
LW	11	Jonny May
FH	10	Owen Farrell (c)
SH	9	Ben Youngs	(substituted off) 62'
N8	8	Billy Vunipola
OF	7	Jack Willis	(substituted off) 47'
BF	6	Maro Itoje
RL	5	Joe Launchbury
LL	4	Charlie Ewels	(substituted off) 65'
TP	3	Will Stuart	(substituted off) 48'
HK	2	Jamie George	(substituted off) 65'
LP	1	Ellis Genge	(substituted off) 48'
Replacements:
HK	16	Tom Dunn	(substituted in) 65'
PR	17	Mako Vunipola	(substituted in) 48'
PR	18	Kyle Sinckler	(substituted in) 48'
FL	19	Ben Earl	(substituted in) 47'
FL	20	Tom Curry	(substituted in) 65'
SH	21	Dan Robson	(substituted in) 62'
FH	22	Max Malins	(substituted in) 62'
CE	23	Joe Marchant	(substituted in) 39'
Coach:
Eddie Jones

FB	15	Lasha Khmaladze
RW	14	Aka Tabutsadze
OC	13	Giorgi Kveseladze
IC	12	Merab Sharikadze (c)
LW	11	Sandro Svanidze	(substituted off) 80'
FH	10	Tedo Abzhandadze
SH	9	Gela Aprasidze	(substituted off) 66'
N8	8	Beka Gorgadze	(substituted off) 60'
OF	7	Giorgi Tkhilaishvili	(substituted off) 73'
BF	6	Beka Saghinadze
RL	5	Grigor Kerdikoshvili	(substituted off) 65'
LL	4	Lasha Jaiani
TP	3	Beka Gigashvili	(substituted off) 60'
HK	2	Shalva Mamukashvili	(substituted off) 47'
LP	1	Mikheil Nariashvili	(substituted off) 47'
Replacements:
HK	16	Jaba Bregvadze	(substituted in) 47'
PR	17	Guram Gogichashvili	(substituted in) 47'
PR	18	Lekso Kaulashvili	(substituted in) 60'
FL	19	Otar Giorgadze	(substituted in) 60'
FL	20	Tornike Jalaghonia	(substituted in) 73'
LK	21	Giorgi Javakhia	(substituted in) 65'
SH	22	Vasil Lobzhanidze	(substituted in) 66'
WG	23	Alexander Todua	(substituted in) 80'
Coach:
Levan Maisashvili

Player of the Match:
Jamie George (England)

Assistant refereess:
Craig Evans (Wales)
Adam Jones (Wales)
Television match official:
Ben Whitehouse (Wales)

Notes:

- Demur Tapladze had been named on the bench for Georgia, but was withdrawn ahead of kick off and replaced by Giorgi Javakhia.
- Max Malins, Jack Willis (both England) and Sandro Svanidze (Georgia) made their international debuts.
- Jamie George became the first England men's hooker to score a hat-trick.
- The two nations faced each other outside of a Rugby World Cup for the first time.

==== Round 2 ====
21 November 2020
15:00 GMT (UTC+0)

England	18–7	Ireland
Try: May (2) 17' m, 21' c Con: Farrell (1/2) 22'; Pen: Farrell (2/2) 46', 52'	Report	Try: Stockdale 74' c Con: Burns (1/1) 75'

Twickenham Stadium, London
Attendance: 0
Referee: Pascal Gaüzère (France)

Team details

FB	15	Elliot Daly
RW	14	Jonathan Joseph	(substituted off) 72'
OC	13	Ollie Lawrence	(substituted off) 69'
IC	12	Henry Slade
LW	11	Jonny May
FH	10	Owen Farrell (c)
SH	9	Ben Youngs	(substituted off) 63'
N8	8	Billy Vunipola
OF	7	Sam Underhill	(substituted off) 63'
BF	6	Tom Curry
RL	5	Joe Launchbury	(substituted off) 69'
LL	4	Maro Itoje
TP	3	Kyle Sinckler	(substituted off) 69'
HK	2	Jamie George	(substituted off) 80'
LP	1	Mako Vunipola	(substituted off) 63'
Replacements:
HK	16	Tom Dunn	(substituted in) 80'
PR	17	Ellis Genge	(substituted in) 63'
PR	18	Will Stuart	(substituted in) 69'
LK	19	Jonny Hill	(substituted in) 69'
FL	20	Ben Earl	(substituted in) 63'
SH	21	Dan Robson	(substituted in) 63'
FH	22	George Ford	(substituted in) 69'
FH	23	Max Malins	(substituted in) 72'
Coach:
Eddie Jones

FB	15	Hugo Keenan	(substituted off) 58'
RW	14	Keith Earls
OC	13	Chris Farrell
IC	12	Bundee Aki
LW	11	James Lowe
FH	10	Ross Byrne	(substituted off) 69'
SH	9	Jamison Gibson-Park	(substituted off) 51'
N8	8	Caelan Doris
OF	7	Peter O'Mahony
BF	6	CJ Stander	(substituted off) 66'
RL	5	James Ryan (c)
LL	4	Quinn Roux	(substituted off) 51'
TP	3	Andrew Porter
HK	2	Rónan Kelleher	(substituted off) 51'
LP	1	Cian Healy	(substituted off) 66'
Replacements:
HK	16	Rob Herring	(substituted in) 51'
PR	17	Finlay Bealham	(substituted in) 66'
PR	18	John Ryan
LK	19	Iain Henderson	(substituted in) 51'
FL	20	Will Connors	(substituted in) 66'
SH	21	Conor Murray	(substituted in) 51'
FH	22	Billy Burns	(substituted in) 69'
WG	23	Jacob Stockdale	(substituted in) 58'
Coach:
Andy Farrell

Player of the Match:
Maro Itoje (England)

Assistant referees:
Mathieu Raynal (France)
Alexandre Ruiz (France)
Television match official:
Nigel Owens (Wales)

21 November 2020
17:15 GMT (UTC+0)

Wales	18–0	Georgia
Try: Rees-Zammit 26' c Webb 76' m Con: Sheedy (1/2) 27'; Pen: Sheedy (2/3) 10', 52'	Report

Parc y Scarlets, Llanelli
Attendance: 0
Referee: Luke Pearce (England)

Team details

FB	15	Liam Williams	(substituted off) 59'
RW	14	Johnny McNicholl	(substituted off) 43'
OC	13	Nick Tompkins
IC	12	Johnny Williams
LW	11	Louis Rees-Zammit
FH	10	Callum Sheedy
SH	9	Kieran Hardy	(substituted off) 56'
N8	8	Aaron Wainwright
OF	7	Justin Tipuric (c)	(substituted off) 56'
BF	6	James Botham
RL	5	Seb Davies	(substituted off) 63'
LL	4	Jake Ball
TP	3	Samson Lee	(substituted off) 63'
HK	2	Elliot Dee	(substituted off) 71'
LP	1	Wyn Jones	(substituted off) 68'
Replacements:
HK	16	Sam Parry	(substituted in) 71'
PR	17	Nicky Smith	(substituted in) 68'
PR	18	Leon Brown	(substituted in) 63'
LK	19	Cory Hill	(substituted in) 63'
FL	20	James Davies	(substituted in) 56'
SH	21	Rhys Webb	(substituted in) 56'
FH	22	Ioan Lloyd	(substituted in) 59'
WG	23	Jonah Holmes	(substituted in) 43'
Coach:
Wayne Pivac

FB	15	Lasha Khmaladze
RW	14	Aka Tabutsadze		(substituted off) 78'
OC	13	Giorgi Kveseladze
IC	12	Merab Sharikadze (c)
LW	11	Alexander Todua		(substituted off) 78'
FH	10	Tedo Abzhandadze
SH	9	Vasil Lobzhanidze		(substituted off) 56'
N8	8	Beka Gorgadze
OF	7	Beka Saghinadze	(yellow card) 56' to 68'
BF	6	Otari Giorgadze		(substituted off) 56'
RL	5	Konstantin Mikautadze		(substituted off) 38'
LL	4	Grigor Kerdikoshvili
TP	3	Beka Gigashvili		(substituted off) 55'
HK	2	Jaba Bregvadze		(substituted off) 63'
LP	1	Mikheil Nariashvili		(substituted off) 55'
Replacements:
HK	16	Giorgi Chkoidze		(substituted in) 63'
PR	17	Guram Gogichashvili		(substituted in) 55'
PR	18	Lekso Kaulashvili		(substituted in) 55'
LK	19	Lasha Jaiani		(substituted in) 38'
FL	20	Giorgi Tkhilaishvili		(substituted in) 56'
SH	21	Gela Aprasidze		(substituted in) 56'
WG	22	Demur Tapladze		(substituted in) 78'
WG	23	Tamaz Mchedlidze		(substituted in) 78'
Coach:
Levan Maisashvili

Player of the Match:
Aaron Wainwright (Wales)

Assistant refereess:
Andrew Brace (Ireland)
Frank Murphy (Ireland)
Television match official:
Joy Neville (Ireland)

Notes:

- James Botham, Kieran Hardy, Ioan Lloyd and Johnny Williams (all Wales) made their international debuts.
- Joy Neville became the first woman to perform television match official duties in a major men's international competition.

==== Round 3 ====
28 November 2020
16:00 GMT (UTC+0)

Wales	13–24	England
Try: J. Williams 10' c Con: Halfpenny (1/1) 12'; Pen: Biggar (2/2) 56', 59'	Report	Try: Slade 15' m M. Vunipola 51' c Con: Farrell (1/2) 52'; Pen: Farrell (4/6) 31', 40', 67', 73'

Parc y Scarlets, Llanelli
Attendance: 0
Referee: Romain Poite (France)

Team details

FB	15	Leigh Halfpenny	(substituted off) 67'
RW	14	Louis Rees-Zammit
OC	13	Nick Tompkins	(substituted off) 74'
IC	12	Johnny Williams
LW	11	Josh Adams
FH	10	Dan Biggar
SH	9	Lloyd Williams	(substituted off) 49'
N8	8	Taulupe Faletau
OF	7	James Botham
BF	6	Shane Lewis-Hughes	(substituted off) 52'
RL	5	Alun Wyn Jones (c)
LL	4	Jake Ball	(substituted off) 49'
TP	3	Samson Lee	(substituted off) 43'
HK	2	Ryan Elias	(substituted off) 48'
LP	1	Wyn Jones	(substituted off) 70'
Replacements:
HK	16	Elliot Dee	(substituted in) 48'
PR	17	Rhys Carré	(substituted in) 70'
PR	18	Tomas Francis	(substituted in) 43'
LK	19	Will Rowlands	(substituted in) 49'
FL	20	Aaron Wainwright	(substituted in) 52'
SH	21	Rhys Webb	(substituted in) 49'
FH	22	Callum Sheedy	(substituted in) 67'
CE	23	Owen Watkin	(substituted in) 74'
Coach:
Wayne Pivac

FB	15	Elliot Daly
RW	14	Jonathan Joseph	(substituted off) 52'
OC	13	Henry Slade
IC	12	Owen Farrell (c)
LW	11	Jonny May
FH	10	George Ford
SH	9	Ben Youngs	(substituted off) 77'
N8	8	Billy Vunipola
OF	7	Sam Underhill	(substituted off) 74'
BF	6	Tom Curry	(substituted off) 61'
RL	5	Joe Launchbury	(substituted off) 67'
LL	4	Maro Itoje
TP	3	Kyle Sinckler	(substituted off) 73'
HK	2	Jamie George	(substituted off) 67'
LP	1	Mako Vunipola	(substituted off) 67'
Replacements:
HK	16	Luke Cowan-Dickie	(substituted in) 67'
PR	17	Ellis Genge	(substituted in) 67'
PR	18	Will Stuart	(substituted in) 73'
LK	19	Jonny Hill	(substituted in) 67'
FL	20	Ben Earl	(substituted in) 74'
FL	21	Jack Willis	(substituted in) 61'
SH	22	Dan Robson	(substituted in) 77'
FB	23	Anthony Watson	(substituted in) 52'
Coach:
Eddie Jones

Player of the Match:
Sam Underhill (England)

Assistant referees:
Pascal Gaüzère (France)
Alexandre Ruiz (France)
Television match official:
Brian MacNeice (Ireland)

29 November 2020
14:00 WET (UTC+0)

Ireland	23–10	Georgia
Try: Burns 9' c Keenan 34' c Con: Burns (2/2) 10', 35'; Pen: Burns (2/2) 14', 23'; Byrne (1/1) 59'	Report	Try: Kveseladze 17' c Con: Abzhandadze (1/1) 18'; Pen: Abzhandadze (1/1) 48'

Aviva Stadium, Dublin
Attendance: 0
Referee: Mathieu Raynal (France)

Team details

FB	15	Jacob Stockdale
RW	14	Hugo Keenan
OC	13	Chris Farrell
IC	12	Stuart McCloskey
LW	11	Keith Earls	(substituted off) 63'
FH	10	Billy Burns	(substituted off) 46'
SH	9	Conor Murray	(substituted off) 57'
N8	8	CJ Stander
OF	7	Will Connors	(substituted off) 67'
BF	6	Tadhg Beirne	(substituted off) 62'
RL	5	James Ryan (c)	(substituted off) 62'
LL	4	Iain Henderson
TP	3	Andrew Porter	(substituted off) 41'
HK	2	Rob Herring
LP	1	Finlay Bealham	(substituted off) 57'
Replacements:
HK	16	Dave Heffernan	(substituted in) 67'
PR	17	Cian Healy	(substituted in) 57'
PR	18	John Ryan	(substituted in) 41'
LK	19	Quinn Roux	(substituted in) 62'
FL	20	Peter O'Mahony	(substituted in) 62'
SH	21	Kieran Marmion	(substituted in) 57'
FH	22	Ross Byrne	(substituted in) 46'
FB	23	Shane Daly	(substituted in) 63'
Coach:
Andy Farrell

FB	15	Soso Matiashvili
RW	14	Aka Tabutsadze
OC	13	Giorgi Kveseladze
IC	12	Merab Sharikadze (c)	(substituted off) 67'
LW	11	Tamaz Mchedlidze	(substituted off) 65'
FH	10	Tedo Abzhandadze
SH	9	Vasil Lobzhanidze	(substituted off) 74'
N8	8	Beka Gorgadze	(substituted off) 63'
OF	7	Tornike Jalaghonia
BF	6	Beka Saghinadze
RL	5	Lasha Jaiani
LL	4	Nodar Tcheishvili	(substituted off) 62'
TP	3	Beka Gigashvili	(substituted off) 71'
HK	2	Shalva Mamukashvili	9' to 19'		(substituted off) 65'
LP	1	Mikheil Nariashvili	(substituted off) 50'
Replacements:
HK	16	Giorgi Chkoidze	(substituted in) 9'	(substituted off) 19'	(substituted in) 65'
PR	17	Lekso Kaulashvili	(substituted in) 50'
PR	18	Giorgi Melikidze	(substituted in) 71'
LK	19	Giorgi Javakhia	(substituted in) 62'
FL	20	Mikheil Gachechiladze	(substituted in) 63'
SH	21	Mikheil Alania	(substituted in) 74'
WG	22	Demur Tapladze	(substituted in) 65'
FB	23	Davit Niniashvili	(substituted in) 67'
Coach:
Levan Maisashvili

Player of the Match:
Iain Henderson (Ireland)

Assistant referees:
Luke Pearce (England)
Andrea Piardi (Italy)
Television match official:
Marius Mitrea (Italy)

Notes:

- Shane Daly (Ireland) and Mikheil Alania and Davit Niniashvili (both Georgia) made their international debuts.

=== Group B ===
Position	Nation	Games				Points			Tries		Bonus points		Table points
Position	Nation	Pld	W	D	L	PF	PA	PD	TF	TA	Tries	Loser	Table points
1	France	3	3	0	0	86	20	+66	10	1	2	0	14
2	Scotland	3	2	0	1	71	39	+32	8	2	2	1	11
3	Italy	3	1	0	2	50	64	–14	6	9	1	0	5
4	Fiji	3	0	0	3	0	84	–84	0	12	0	0	0

==== Round 1 ====
14 November 2020
13:45 CET (UTC+01)

Italy	17–28	Scotland (1 BP)
Try: Minozzi 26' m Pen: Garbisi (4/4) 7', 18', 43', 61'	Report	Try: Van der Merwe 24' c Z. Fagerson 49 'c Cummings 67' c Turner 77' c Con: Weir (4/4) 25', 50', 68', 78'

Stadio Artemio Franchi, Florence
Attendance: 0
Referee: Luke Pearce (England)

Team details

FB	15	Matteo Minozzi	(substituted off) 66'	(substituted in) 77'
RW	14	Jacopo Trulla
OC	13	Marco Zanon	(substituted off) 55'
IC	12	Carlo Canna
LW	11	Mattia Bellini
FH	10	Paolo Garbisi
SH	9	Marcello Violi	(substituted off) 55'
N8	8	Jake Polledri	(substituted off) 68'
OF	7	Braam Steyn
BF	6	Sebastian Negri	(substituted off) 49'
RL	5	Niccolò Cannone
LL	4	Marco Lazzaroni
TP	3	Giosuè Zilocchi	(substituted off) 55'
HK	2	Luca Bigi (c)	(substituted off) 47'
LP	1	Danilo Fischetti	(substituted off) 66'
Replacements:
HK	16	Leonardo Ghiraldini	(substituted in) 47'
PR	17	Simone Ferrari	(substituted in) 66'
PR	18	Pietro Ceccarelli	(substituted in) 55'
N8	19	Johan Meyer	(substituted in) 49'
FL	20	Maxime Mbanda	(substituted in) 68'
SH	21	Stephen Varney	(substituted in) 55'
FH	22	Tommaso Allan	(substituted in) 66'	(substituted off) 77'
CE	23	Federico Mori	(substituted in) 55'
Coach:
Franco Smith

FB	15	Stuart Hogg (c)
RW	14	Darcy Graham	(substituted off) 66'
OC	13	Chris Harris
IC	12	Sam Johnson	(substituted off) 68'
LW	11	Duhan van der Merwe
FH	10	Duncan Weir
SH	9	Ali Price	(substituted off) 72'
N8	8	Blade Thomson
OF	7	Hamish Watson
BF	6	Jamie Ritchie	(substituted off) 13'
RL	5	Jonny Gray
LL	4	Scott Cummings
TP	3	Zander Fagerson	(substituted off) 66'
HK	2	Stuart McInally	(substituted off) 61'
LP	1	Rory Sutherland	(substituted off) 16'
Replacements:
HK	16	George Turner	(substituted in) 61'
PR	17	Oli Kebble	(substituted in) 16'
PR	18	WP Nel	(substituted in) 66'
LK	19	Sam Skinner		(substituted in) 61'
FL	20	Nick Haining	(substituted in) 13'	(substituted off) 61'
SH	21	Sam Hidalgo-Clyne	(substituted in) 72'
CE	22	James Lang	(substituted in) 68'
FB	23	Blair Kinghorn	(substituted in) 66'
Coach:
Gregor Townsend

Player of the Match:
Duhan van der Merwe (Scotland)

Assistant referees:
Karl Dickson (England)
Christophe Ridley (England)
Television match official:
Wayne Barnes (England)

Notes:

- Jacopo Trulla and Stephen Varney (both Italy) made their international debuts.

15 November 2020
16:15 CET (UTC+01)

(1 BP) France	28–0 (Cancelled)	Fiji

Stade de la Rabine, Vannes
Referee: Matthew Carley (England)

==== Round 2 ====
21 November 2020
13:45 CET (UTC+01)

(1 BP) Italy	28–0 (Cancelled)	Fiji

Stadio del Conero, Ancona
Referee: Romain Poite (France)

22 November 2020
15:15 GMT (UTC+0)

(1 BP) Scotland	15–22	France
Pen: Weir (5/5) 17', 21', 28', 38', 47'	Report	Try: Vakatawa 42' c Con: Ramos (1/1) 43'; Pen: Ramos (4/5) 4', 10', 30', 61'; Drop: Jalibert (1/1) 24'

Murrayfield Stadium, Edinburgh
Attendance: 0
Referee: Wayne Barnes (England)

Team details

FB	15	Stuart Hogg (c)
RW	14	Blair Kinghorn	(substituted off) 62'
OC	13	Chris Harris
IC	12	Sam Johnson	(substituted off) 73'
LW	11	Duhan van der Merwe
FH	10	Duncan Weir
SH	9	Ali Price
N8	8	Matt Fagerson
OF	7	Hamish Watson	(substituted off) 62'
BF	6	Jamie Ritchie
RL	5	Jonny Gray	(substituted off) 68'
LL	4	Scott Cummings
TP	3	Simon Berghan	(substituted off) 43'
HK	2	Fraser Brown	(substituted off) 68'
LP	1	Oli Kebble	(substituted off) 68'
Replacements:
HK	16	George Turner	(substituted in) 68'
PR	17	Jamie Bhatti	(substituted in) 68'
PR	18	Zander Fagerson	(substituted in) 43'
LK	19	Sam Skinner	(substituted in) 68'
FL	20	Blade Thomson	(substituted in) 62'
SH	21	Sam Hidalgo-Clyne
CE	22	Duncan Taylor	(substituted in) 73'
WG	23	Sean Maitland	(substituted in) 62'
Coach:
Gregor Townsend

FB	15	Thomas Ramos
RW	14	Teddy Thomas
OC	13	Virimi Vakatawa
IC	12	Gaël Fickou
LW	11	Vincent Rattez	(substituted off) 71'
FH	10	Matthieu Jalibert
SH	9	Antoine Dupont
N8	8	Grégory Alldritt
OF	7	Charles Ollivon (c)
BF	6	Dylan Cretin
RL	5	Romain Taofifénua	(substituted off) 62'
LL	4	Bernard Le Roux
TP	3	Demba Bamba	(substituted off) 56'
HK	2	Camille Chat	(substituted off) 54'
LP	1	Jean-Baptiste Gros	(substituted off) 54'
Replacements:
HK	16	Julien Marchand	(substituted in) 54'
PR	17	Cyril Baille	(substituted in) 54'
PR	18	Mohamed Haouas	(substituted in) 56'
LK	19	Paul Willemse	(substituted in) 62'
FL	20	Cameron Woki
SH	21	Baptiste Couilloud
FH	22	Louis Carbonel
WG	23	Arthur Vincent	(substituted in) 71'
Coach:
Fabien Galthié

Player of the Match:
Virimi Vakatawa (France)

Assistant referees:
Matthew Carley (England)
Nika Amashukeli (Georgia)
Television match official:
Ben Whitehouse (Wales)

Notes:

- Scotland lost at home to France for the first time since 2014.

==== Round 3 ====
28 November 2020
13:45 GMT (UTC+0)

(1 BP) Scotland	28–0 (Cancelled)	Fiji

Murrayfield Stadium, Edinburgh
Referee: Andrew Brace (Ireland)

28 November 2020
21:10 CET (UTC+01)

(1 BP) France	36–5	Italy
Try: Danty 36' c Villière 55' c Serin 61' c Thomas 63' m Macalou 80' c Con: Jalibert (3/4) 37', 55', 62'; Carbonel (1/1) 80'; Pen: Jalibert (1/1) 3'	Report	Try: Canna 26' m

Stade de France, Saint-Denis
Attendance: 0
Referee: Nigel Owens (Wales)

Team details

FB	15	Brice Dulin
RW	14	Teddy Thomas
OC	13	Jean-Pascal Barraque	(substituted off) 69'
IC	12	Jonathan Danty
LW	11	Gabin Villière
FH	10	Matthieu Jalibert	(substituted off) 70'
SH	9	Baptiste Serin (c)	(substituted off) 70'
N8	8	Anthony Jelonch
OF	7	Sekou Macalou
BF	6	Cameron Woki
RL	5	Baptiste Pesenti	(substituted off) 75'
LL	4	Kilian Geraci	(substituted off) 60'
TP	3	Dorian Aldegheri	(substituted off) 52'
HK	2	Peato Mauvaka	(substituted off) 52'
LP	1	Rodrigue Neti	(substituted off) 52'
Replacements:
HK	16	Teddy Baubigny	(substituted in) 52'
PR	17	Hassane Kolingar	(substituted in) 52'
PR	18	Uini Atonio	(substituted in) 52'
LK	19	Cyril Cazeaux	(substituted in) 60'
FL	20	Swan Rebbadj	(substituted in) 75'
SH	21	Baptiste Couilloud	(substituted in) 70'
FH	22	Louis Carbonel	(substituted in) 70'
CE	23	Yoram Moefana	(substituted in) 69'
Coach:
Fabien Galthié

FB	15	Matteo Minozzi
RW	14	Jacopo Trulla	(yellow card) 53' to 64'
OC	13	Marco Zanon		(substituted off) 52'
IC	12	Carlo Canna		(substituted off) 43'
LW	11	Luca Sperandio
FH	10	Paolo Garbisi
SH	9	Marcello Violi		(substituted off) 64'
N8	8	Braam Steyn
OF	7	Johan Meyer
BF	6	Maxime Mbanda		(substituted off) 62'
RL	5	Niccolò Cannone
LL	4	Marco Lazzaroni		(substituted off) 75'
TP	3	Giosuè Zilocchi		(substituted off) 62'
HK	2	Luca Bigi (c)		(substituted off) 52'
LP	1	Danilo Fischetti		(substituted off) 62'
Replacements:
HK	16	Leonardo Ghiraldini		(substituted in) 52'
PR	17	Simone Ferrari		(substituted in) 62'
PR	18	Pietro Ceccarelli		(substituted in) 62'
LK	19	Cristian Stoian		(substituted in) 75'
FL	20	Michele Lamaro		(substituted in) 62'
SH	21	Stephen Varney		(substituted in) 64'
FH	22	Tommaso Allan		(substituted in) 52'
CE	23	Federico Mori		(substituted in) 43'
Coach:
Franco Smith

Player of the Match:
Brice Dulin (France)

Assistant referees:
Matthew Carley (England)
Mike Adamson (Scotland)
Television match official:
Sam Grove-White (Scotland)

Notes:

- Jean-Pascal Barraque, Teddy Baubigny, Louis Carbonel, Cyril Cazeaux, Kilian Geraci, Hassane Kolingar, Yoram Moefana, Rodrigue Neti, Baptiste Pesenti, Swan Rebbadj, Gabin Villière (all France), Michele Lamaro and Cristian Stoian (both Italy) made their international debuts.
- Nigel Owens became the first referee to officiate 100 test matches.

=== Finals ===
==== 7th/8th place play-off ====
5 December 2020
12:00 GMT (UTC+0)

Georgia	24–38	Fiji
Try: Melikidze 23' c Saghinadze (2) 68' c, 79' c Con: Abzhandadze (3/3) 24', 68', 80'; Pen: Abzhandadze (1/1) 11'	Report	Try: Nadolo (3) 2' m, 59' m, 63' c Dyer 6' c Tuisova 18' c Kunavula 54' c Con: Volavola (4/6) 8', 19', 56', 64'

Murrayfield Stadium, Edinburgh
Attendance: 0
Referee: Mike Adamson (Scotland)

Team details

FB	15	Soso Matiashvili	(substituted off) 61'
RW	14	Aka Tabutsadze
OC	13	Giorgi Kveseladze
IC	12	Merab Sharikadze (c)
LW	11	Alexander Todua
FH	10	Tedo Abzhandadze
SH	9	Vasil Lobzhanidze	(substituted off) 61'
N8	8	Tornike Jalaghonia
OF	7	Beka Saghinadze
BF	6	Otar Giorgadze	(substituted off) 61'
RL	5	Kote Mikautadze	(substituted off) 69'
LL	4	Lasha Jaiani
TP	3	Beka Gigashvili	(substituted off) 11'
HK	2	Shalva Mamukashvili	(substituted off) 50'
LP	1	Mikheil Nariashvili	(substituted off) 69'
Replacements:
HK	16	Jaba Bregvadze	(substituted in) 50'
PR	17	Guram Gogichashvili	(substituted in) 69'
PR	18	Giorgi Melikidze	(substituted in) 11'
LK	19	Grigor Kerdikoshvili	(substituted in) 69'
FL	20	Mikheil Gachechiladze	(substituted in) 61'
SH	21	Gela Aprasidze	(substituted in) 61'
CE	22	Demur Tapladze
FB	23	Davit Niniashvili	(substituted in) 61'
Coach:
Levan Maisashvili

FB	15	Kini Murimurivalu	(substituted off) 69'
RW	14	Josua Tuisova
OC	13	Semi Radradra (c)
IC	12	Levani Botia	(substituted off) 74'
LW	11	Nemani Nadolo
FH	10	Ben Volavola
SH	9	Frank Lomani	(substituted off) 74'
N8	8	Albert Tuisue	(substituted off) 69'
OF	7	Mesulame Kunavula
BF	6	Johnny Dyer
RL	5	Temo Mayanavanua	(substituted off) 65'
LL	4	Tevita Ratuva
TP	3	Mesake Doge	(substituted off) 61'
HK	2	Sam Matavesi	(substituted off) 73'
LP	1	Peni Ravai	(substituted off) 73'
Replacements:
HK	16	Tevita Ikanivere	(substituted in) 73'
PR	17	Haereiti Hetet	(substituted in) 73'
PR	18	Samu Tawake	(substituted in) 61'
LK	19	Chris Minimbi	(substituted in) 65'
FL	20	Manueli Ratuniyarawa	(substituted in) 69'
SH	21	Simione Kuruvoli	(substituted in) 74'
CE	22	Seru Vularika	(substituted in) 74'
WG	23	Waisea Nayacalevu	(substituted in) 69'
Coach:
Vern Cotter

Player of the Match:
Nemani Nadolo (Fiji)

Assistant referees:
Sam Grove-White (Scotland)
Andrea Piardi (Italy)
Television match official:
Brian MacNeice (Ireland)

Notes:

- Haereiti Hetet, Tevita Ikanivere, Mesulame Kunavula, Simione Kuruvoli, Temo Mayanavanua, Chris Minimbi, Manueli Ratuniyarawa and Samu Tawake (all Fiji) made their international debuts.

==== 5th/6th place play-off ====
5 December 2020
16:45 GMT (UTC+0)

Wales	38–18	Italy
Try: Hardy 7' c Parry 17' c G. Davies 58' c North 69' c Tipuric 76' c Con: Sheedy (5/5) 8', 18', 59', 70', 77'; Pen: Sheedy (1/1) 46'	Report	Try: Zanon 33' c Meyer 49' m Con: Garbisi (1/2) 35'; Pen: Garbisi (2/2) 29', 39'

Parc y Scarlets, Llanelli
Attendance: 0
Referee: Wayne Barnes (England)

Team details

FB	15	Liam Williams		(substituted off) 19'
RW	14	Josh Adams	(yellow card) 38' to 51'
OC	13	George North
IC	12	Jonathan Davies
LW	11	Louis Rees-Zammit
FH	10	Callum Sheedy
SH	9	Kieran Hardy		(substituted off) 50'
N8	8	Taulupe Faletau
OF	7	Justin Tipuric
BF	6	James Botham		(substituted off) 50'
RL	5	Alun Wyn Jones (c)		(substituted off) 63'
LL	4	Will Rowlands		(substituted off) 54'
TP	3	Tomas Francis		(substituted off) 70'
HK	2	Sam Parry
LP	1	Nicky Smith		(substituted off) 51'
Replacements:
HK	16	Elliot Dee		(substituted in) 63'
PR	17	Wyn Jones		(substituted in) 51'
PR	18	Leon Brown		(substituted in) 70'
LK	19	Cory Hill		(substituted in) 54'
FL	20	Aaron Wainwright		(substituted in) 50'
SH	21	Gareth Davies		(substituted in) 50'
FB	22	Ioan Lloyd		(substituted in) 19'	(substituted off) 59'
WG	23	Jonah Holmes			(substituted in) 59'
Coach:
Wayne Pivac

FB	15	Jacopo Trulla
RW	14	Luca Sperandio	(substituted off) 55'
OC	13	Marco Zanon	(substituted off) 77'
IC	12	Carlo Canna
LW	11	Monty Ioane
FH	10	Paolo Garbisi
SH	9	Stephen Varney	(substituted off) 70'
N8	8	Braam Steyn
OF	7	Johan Meyer
BF	6	Maxime Mbanda	(substituted off) 63'
RL	5	Niccolò Cannone	(substituted off) 77'
LL	4	Marco Lazzaroni
TP	3	Giosuè Zilocchi	(substituted off) 70'
HK	2	Luca Bigi (c)	(substituted off) 63'
LP	1	Danilo Fischetti	(substituted off) 77'
Replacements:
HK	16	Leonardo Ghiraldini	(substituted in) 63'
PR	17	Simone Ferrari	(substituted in) 77'
PR	18	Pietro Ceccarelli	(substituted in) 70'
LK	19	Cristian Stoian	(substituted in) 77'
FL	20	Michele Lamaro	(substituted in) 63'
SH	21	Guglielmo Palazzani	(substituted in) 70'
FH	22	Tommaso Allan	(substituted in) 77'
CE	23	Federico Mori	(substituted in) 55'
Coach:
Franco Smith

Player of the Match:
Taulupe Faletau (Wales)

Assistant referees:
Luke Pearce (England)
Alexandre Ruiz (France)
Television match official:
Pascal Gaüzère (France)

Notes:

- Monty Ioane (Italy) made his international debut.
- Johnny Williams (Wales) was named to start at inside centre, but picked up an injury ahead of kick-off and Jonathan Davies replaced him in the starting XV.

==== 3rd/4th place play-off ====
5 December 2020
14:15 WET (UTC+0)

Ireland	31–16	Scotland
Try: Earls (2) 38' m, 50' c Healy 44' c Con: Sexton (2/3) 44', 51'; Pen: Sexton (2/3) 23', 32'; Byrne (2/2) 66', 76'	Report	Try: Van der Merwe 56' c Con: Van der Walt (1/1) 57'; Pen: Van der Walt (3/4) 13', 20', 27'

Aviva Stadium, Dublin
Attendance: 0
Referee: Matthew Carley (England)

Team details

FB	15	Jacob Stockdale
RW	14	Hugo Keenan
OC	13	Bundee Aki
IC	12	Robbie Henshaw	(substituted off) 78'
LW	11	Keith Earls
FH	10	Johnny Sexton	(substituted off) 64'
SH	9	Conor Murray	(substituted off) 79'
N8	8	Caelan Doris			(substituted off) 66'	(substituted in) 75'
OF	7	Peter O'Mahony	(substituted off) 51'	(substituted in) 63'
BF	6	CJ Stander
RL	5	James Ryan (c)				(substituted off) 75'
LL	4	Iain Henderson	(substituted off) 38'
TP	3	Andrew Porter	(substituted off) 75'
HK	2	Rob Herring	(substituted off) 66'
LP	1	Cian Healy	(substituted off) 66'
Replacements:
HK	16	Ronan Kelleher	(substituted in) 66'
PR	17	Eric O'Sullivan	(substituted in) 66'
PR	18	John Ryan	(substituted in) 75'
LK	19	Quinn Roux	(substituted in) 38'
FL	20	Josh van der Flier	(substituted in) 51'	(substituted off) 63'	(substituted in) 66'
SH	21	Jamison Gibson-Park	(substituted in) 79'
FH	22	Ross Byrne	(substituted in) 64'
CE	23	Chris Farrell	(substituted in) 78'
Coach:
Andy Farrell

FB	15	Stuart Hogg (c)
RW	14	Darcy Graham		(substituted off) 57'
OC	13	Chris Harris
IC	12	Duncan Taylor	(yellow card) 31' to 41'	45' to 51'		(substituted off) 64'
LW	11	Duhan van der Merwe
FH	10	Jaco van der Walt
SH	9	Ali Price		(substituted off) 75'
N8	8	Matt Fagerson
OF	7	Jamie Ritchie		(substituted off) 66'
BF	6	Blade Thomson
RL	5	Jonny Gray
LL	4	Scott Cummings		(substituted off) 64'
TP	3	Zander Fagerson		(substituted off) 68'
HK	2	Fraser Brown		(substituted off) 68'
LP	1	Rory Sutherland		(substituted off) 64'
Replacements:
HK	16	George Turner		(substituted in) 68'
PR	17	Oli Kebble		(substituted in) 64'
PR	18	WP Nel		(substituted in) 68'
LK	19	Sam Skinner		(substituted in) 64'
FL	20	Blair Cowan		(substituted in) 66'
SH	21	Sam Hidalgo-Clyne		(substituted in) 75'
CE	22	Huw Jones		(substituted in) 45'	(substituted off) 51'	(substituted off) 64'
WG	23	Sean Maitland		(substituted in) 57'
Coach:
Gregor Townsend

Player of the Match:
Caelan Doris (Ireland)

Assistant referees:
Romain Poite (France)
Karl Dickson (England)
Television match official:
Dan Jones (Wales)

Notes:

- Eric O'Sullivan (Ireland) and Jaco van der Walt (Scotland) made their international debuts.
- Sean Maitland (Scotland) earned his 50th test cap.
- Stuart McInally (Scotland) was named among the replacements, but was replaced before kick-off by George Turner.

==== Final ====
6 December 2020
14:00 GMT (UTC+0)

England	22–19 (a.e.t.)	France
Try: Cowan-Dickie 80' c Con: Farrell (1/1) 80'; Pen: Farrell (4/8) 8', 48', 73', 96'; Daly (1/1) 19'	Report	Try: Dulin 15' c Con: Jalibert (1/1) 16'; Pen: Jalibert (2/2) 28', 36'; Carbonel (2/2) 70', 76'

Twickenham Stadium, London
Attendance: 2,000 (Note: Spectators numbers limited to 2,000 due to local restrictions surrounding the COVID-19 pandemic.)
Referee: Andrew Brace (Ireland)

Team details

FB	15	Elliot Daly
RW	14	Anthony Watson	(substituted off) 70'
OC	13	Henry Slade
IC	12	Owen Farrell (c)
LW	11	Jonny May
FH	10	George Ford
SH	9	Ben Youngs	(substituted off) 70'
N8	8	Billy Vunipola
OF	7	Sam Underhill	(substituted off) 44'
BF	6	Tom Curry
RL	5	Joe Launchbury	(substituted off) 44'
LL	4	Maro Itoje
TP	3	Kyle Sinckler	(substituted off) 66'
HK	2	Jamie George	(substituted off) 66'
LP	1	Ellis Genge	(substituted off) 59'
Replacements:
HK	16	Luke Cowan-Dickie	(substituted in) 66'
PR	17	Joe Marler	(substituted in) 59'
PR	18	Will Stuart	(substituted in) 66'
LK	19	Jonny Hill	(substituted in) 44'
FL	20	Ben Earl	(substituted in) 44'
SH	21	Dan Robson	(substituted in) 70'
FB	22	Max Malins	(substituted in) 70'
CE	23	Joe Marchant
Coach:
Eddie Jones

FB	15	Brice Dulin
RW	14	Alivereti Raka
OC	13	Yoram Moefana
IC	12	Jonathan Danty	(substituted off) 48'
LW	11	Gabin Villière
FH	10	Matthieu Jalibert	(substituted off) 62'
SH	9	Baptiste Couilloud (c)	(substituted off) 81'
N8	8	Selevasio Tolofua
OF	7	Anthony Jelonch
BF	6	Cameron Woki	(substituted off) 56'
RL	5	Baptiste Pesenti	(substituted off) 56'
LL	4	Kilian Geraci
TP	3	Dorian Aldegheri	(substituted off) 40'
HK	2	Pierre Bourgarit	(substituted off) 53'
LP	1	Hassane Kolingar	(substituted off) 53'
Replacements:
HK	16	Peato Mauvaka	(substituted in) 53'
PR	17	Rodrigue Neti	(substituted in) 53'
PR	18	Uini Atonio	(substituted in) 40'
LK	19	Guillaume Ducat	(substituted in) 56'
FL	20	Sekou Macalou	(substituted in) 56'
SH	21	Sébastien Bézy	(substituted in) 81'
FH	22	Louis Carbonel	(substituted in) 62'
CE	23	Pierre-Louis Barassi	(substituted in) 48'
Coach:
Fabien Galthié

Player of the Match:
Billy Vunipola (England)

Assistant referees:
Frank Murphy (Ireland)
Craig Evans (Wales)
Television match official:
Ben Whitehouse (Wales)

Notes:

- Guillaume Ducat and Selevasio Tolofua (both France) made their international debuts.

== Final standings ==
Position	Nation
1st	England
2nd	France
3rd	Ireland
4th	Scotland
5th	Wales
6th	Italy
7th	Fiji
8th	Georgia

== Player statistics ==
=== Most points ===
Pos	Name	Team	Pts
1	Owen Farrell	England	46
2	Billy Burns	Ireland	23
2	Duncan Weir	Scotland	23
4	Callum Sheedy	Wales	21
5	Paolo Garbisi	Italy	14
5	Matthieu Jalibert	France	14
7	Johnny Sexton	Ireland	18
8	Jamie George	England	15
8	Nemani Nadolo	Fiji	15
10	Thomas Ramos	France	14
10	Tedo Abzhandadze	Georgia	14

=== Most tries ===
Pos	Name	Team	Tries
1	Jamie George	England	3
1	Nemani Nadolo	Fiji	3
3	Keith Earls	Ireland	2
3	Jonny May	England	2
3	Beka Saghinadze	Georgia	2
3	Duhan van der Merwe	Scotland	2
7	39 players		1

== See also ==
- 2020 end-of-year rugby union internationals
- 2020 Six Nations Championship
