= Beka Gigashvili =

Georgian rugby union player

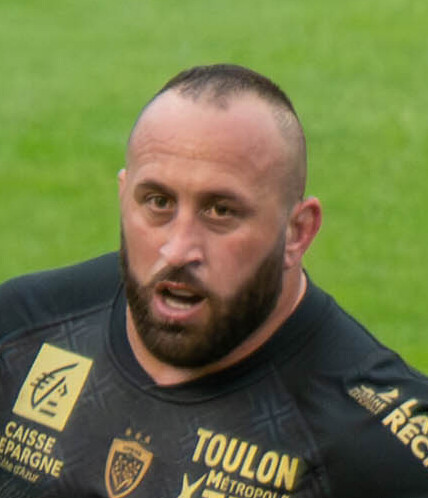
- Gigashvili in 2025
- Born: 17 February 1992 (age 34) Tbilisi, Georgia
- Height: 1.78 m (5 ft 10 in)
- Weight: 118 kg (18 st 8 lb; 260 lb)

Rugby union career
- Position: Prop
Senior career
Years	Team	Apps	(Points)
2015-2017	Chambéry	46	(35)
2017-19	Grenoble	36	(5)
2019-	Toulon	126	(70)
- Correct as of 19 November 2018
International career
Years	Team	Apps	(Points)
2018-	Georgia	46	(25)
- Correct as of 16 September 2019

Beka Gigashvili (Georgian: ბექა გიგაშვილი; born 17 February 1992) is a Georgian rugby union player. His position is prop, and he currently plays for RC Toulonnais in the Top 14 and the Georgia national team.

== Rugby career ==
Gigashvilli was a latecomer to the sport, telling Midi Olympique that he had not seen a rugby match until he was 20 years old. Returning from the army, he was persuaded by a friend to join a training session- six months later, he signed for Spartak GM Moscow in Russia.

In France, Gigashvili helped SO Chambéry win the Jean Prat Trophy at the conclusion of 2016–17 Fédérale 1 season. His former coach, Cyril Villain, described Gigashvili as "versatile", "hard-working", and possessing "very good scrummaging" skills. He signed with Grenoble in 2017.

Following the 2019 Rugby World Cup, Gigashvili signed with Toulon, a move he described as being influenced by previous successful spells at the club for compatriots including Mamuka Gorgodze, Levan Chilachava and Konstantin Mikautadze. He made his debut in a 20–13 win against Bayonne in the 2019-20 European Rugby Challenge Cup in November 2019. He made a strong impression in his first season, bringing stability to the Toulon scrum and winning praise as a powerful carrier, including for his first try for les rouges et noir in a 41–19 win over Clermont. Gigashvili suffered a hamstring injury representing Georgia against Fiji in the Autumn Nations Cup, having started in all their previous games in the competition against England, Wales and Ireland. In February 2021, he renewed his contract with RCT until 2024. At the end of the 2021/22 season, he represented the Barbarians for the first time, starting in a 52–21 win over England at Twickenham Stadium and did the same as Georgia defeated Italy 28–19 in Batumi, his nation's first win over a Six Nations side.

Gigashvili began the 2022-23 Top 14 season in good try scoring form, crossing the line in victories against Clermont, Pau and Stade Français. He was rated as the regular season's best tighthead prop by Midi Olympique, describing him as a 'nightmare' for opponents in the scrum. Gigashvili scored a try and was man-of-the-match as Toulon defeated Benetton Rugby 23–0 to reach the final of the 2022-23 EPCR Challenge Cup, before starting in the final as part of a 43–19 win over Glasgow Warriors at the Aviva Stadium.
