= Mikautadze =

Mikautadze is a Georgian surname. Notable people with the surname include:

- Georges Mikautadze (born 2000), Georgian footballer
- Konstantin Mikautadze (born 1991), Georgian rugby union player
