= Lasha Jaiani =

Georgian rugby union player (born 1998)

- Born: April 21, 1998 (age 28) Tbilisi, Georgia
- Height: 2.00 m (6 ft 6 1/2 in)
- Weight: 115 kg (18 st 2 lb; 254 lb)

Rugby union career
- Position: Lock
Senior career
Years	Team	Apps	(Points)
2016-2019	Exeter University RFC	32	(15)
2020-2021	Wasps	0	(0)
2022-2025	Nevers	12	(0)
- Correct as of 31 January 2023
International career
Years	Team	Apps	(Points)
2017-2018	Georgia U20	12	(0)
2019	Georgia XV	2	(0)
2020-	Georgia	16	(0)
- Correct as of 31 January 2023

Lasha Jaiani (Georgian: ლაშა ჯაიანი) is a Georgian rugby union player. He plays as lock for Exeter University in the BUCS Super Rugby competition. He was announced in Georgia U20 team for 2017 World Rugby Under 20 Championship. Lasha has recently participated in the 2020 Autumn Nations Cup, playing in all four games against England, Wales, Ireland and Fiji. Announced as signing for English Premiership side Wasps in January 2021

== Biography ==
At 14, Lasha Jaiani received a scholarship to study at Whitgift School in London. In 2018, he was called up to play for Georgia in the 2016 European Under-18 Rugby Championship. Following his graduation from Whitgift, he joined Exeter University, where he played for BUCS. He joined the Georgia Under-20 team, competing in the 2017 and 2018 World Junior Championships. He participated in the preparation for the 2019 World Cup, but was not selected in the Georgia final squad, would start for Georgia in the 2020 REC against Belgium, and was then recalled to play in the Autumn Nations Cup.

For the 2019-2020 financial year, he was voted University of Exeter Sportsman of the Year. At the beginning of 2021, he signed for Wasps in the Premiership after completing his degrees (a Bachelor of Science in Sport and a Masters in Health and Wellbeing). He left the club in June of the same year, without having played for the team in an official match.
