= Nika Abuladze =

Georgian rugby union player

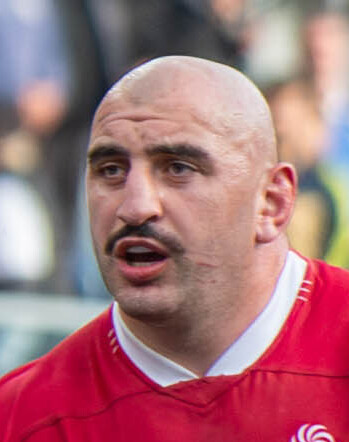
- Born: 29 October 1995 (age 31) Tbilisi, Georgia
- Height: 1.87 m (6 ft 2 in)
- Weight: 126 kg (278 lb; 19 st 12 lb)

Rugby union career
- Position: Prop
- Current team: Montpellier
Senior career
Years	Team	Apps	(Points)
2015–2022	Kochebi Bolnisi	141	(50)
2021–2023	The Black Lion	13	(0)
2023–2024	Exeter Chiefs	16	(0)
2024–2026	Montpellier	17	(0)
2026–	Exeter Chiefs	0	(0)
- Correct as of 29 July 2024
International career
Years	Team	Apps	(Points)
2022–	Georgia	16	(0)
- Correct as of 29 July 2024

Nika Abuladze (Georgian: ნიკა აბულაძე; born 29 October 1995) is a Georgian professional rugby union player who plays as a prop for Exeter Chiefs and the Georgia national team.

== Professional career ==
Nika Abuladze, player of RC Kochebi, is integrated in 2019/2020 into the workforce of the Georgia XV team which is preparing for its South American tour. Although ultimately not retained, he was integrated into the Georgia squad for the European Championship in 2021. Georgian coach Levan Maisashvili describes him as "the best in his position in the Didi 10" . First absent from the match sheets, he is finally a substitute against Romania, but does not come into play.

In 2021, he joined the Georgian franchise of the Black Lion which evolves in Rugby Europe Super Cup, while continuing to evolve in Didi 10 with Kochebi.

He has started in both Rugby Europe Super Cup finals for Black Lion, winning both.

In 2023 he was signed by English Premiership side Exeter Chiefs until the 2024/25 season. After a season at Exeter, Abuladze would join top French side Montpellier in the Top 14 competition from the 2024-25 season. On 23 January 2026, Abuladze would rejoin Exeter Chiefs in the English Premiership from the 2026-27 season after a couple of years in France.

== Honours ==
- 2021 Rugby Europe Super Cup (Black Lion)
- 2022 Rugby Europe Super Cup (Black Lion)
- 2023 Rugby Europe Championship (Georgia)
