= Cristian Stoian =

Italy international rugby union player

- Full name: Niculae Cristian Stoian
- Born: 19 December 1999 (age 26) Chișinău, Moldova
- Height: 1.97 m (6 ft 6 in)
- Weight: 115 kg (18 st 2 lb; 254 lb)

Rugby union career
- Position: Lock
- Current team: Fiamme Oro
Youth career
- 2014−2016: Rugby Anzio
- 2016−2017: Rugby Legio Invicta
Senior career
Years	Team	Apps	(Points)
2017−2019	F.I.R. Academy		
2019−2021	Fiamme Oro	25	(0)
2020−2021	→Zebre	4	(0)
2021−2022	Zebre	3	(0)
2021−2022	→Fiamme Oro	7	(0)
2022−	Fiamme Oro		
- Correct as of 23 April 2022
International career
Years	Team	Apps	(Points)
2019	Italy Under 20	10	(0)
2020−	Italy	2	(0)
2021−2022	Emerging Italy	2	(0)
- Correct as of 5 December 2020

Niculae Cristian Stoian (born 19 December 1999) is a Moldovan-born Italian rugby union player. His usual position is as a Lock and he currently plays for Fiamme Oro.

== Biography ==
Born in Moldavia, Stoian moved to Italy at a young age. He began playing rugby aged 15, signing up with the Rugby Anzio Club. He played an Under-16 and an Under-18 season in Anzio, before being loaned to the Roma Legio XV Rugby youth franchise for the 2016–17 season.

From 2017 to 2019, while playing for the Rugby Anzio Club, Stoian was selected in the F.I.R. Academy, playing two seasons in Serie A. In 2019 he was called up in the Italy Under 20 squad that took part in the Six Nations and World Cup category, making 10 appearances.

In the summer of 2019 Stoian was signed by Top10 team Fiamme Oro and for the end of 2019–20 Pro14 season and for 2020–21 Pro14 season he was named as Permit Player for Zebre. In November 2020 he was called up to the Italy squad by coach Franco Smith, making his international debut on November 28, 2020, in the Autumn Nations Cup match with France, taking over from the bench.

On 8 December 2021, Stoian was selected by Alessandro Troncon to be part of an Emerging Italy 27-man squad for the 2021 end-of-year rugby union internationals. On 26 May he was called in Italy A squad for the South African tour in the 2022 mid-year rugby union tests against Namibia and Currie Cup XV team. On 11 December 2023 he was called in Italy Under 23 squad for test series against IRFU Combined Academies.

In 2021−22 season he played for Zebre in United Rugby Championship with a Dual contract in order to play on loan as Permit Player with Fiamme Oro in Top10.
