= Hassane Kolingar =

France international rugby union player

- Born: Hassane Kolingar; 6 March 1998 (age 28) Paris, France
- Height: 1.86 m (6 ft 1 in)
- Weight: 115 kg (18 st 2 lb; 254 lb)

Rugby union career
- Position: Loosehead prop
- Current team: Racing 92
Senior career
Years	Team	Apps	(Points)
2019–	Racing 92	28	(10)
2019	→ Vannes (loan)	4	(0)
- Correct as of 21 November 2020
International career
Years	Team	Apps	(Points)
2017–2018	France U20	11	(0)
2020–	France	3	(0)
- Correct as of 13 Feb 2021

Hassane Kolingar (born 6 March 1998) is a French rugby union player. His position is loosehead prop and he currently plays for Racing 92 in the Top 14.

He was called for the first time in the France national rugby team in November 2020 for the Autumn Nations Cup.

== Honours ==
=== International ===
France (U20)

- World Rugby Under 20 Championship winners: 2018
