= Sandro Svanidze =

- Born: 27 September 1998 (age 28) Kutaisi, Georgia
- Height: 1.95 m (6 ft 5 in)
- Weight: 100 kg (15 st 10 lb; 220 lb)

Rugby union career
- Position(s): Centre, Wing
Senior career
Years	Team	Apps	(Points)
2016–2019	RC Armazi	29	(20)
2019–2020	RC Jiki		
2021–	RC Armazi	2	
- Correct as of 11 August 2017
International career
Years	Team	Apps	(Points)
2018	Georgia U20	7	(5)
2018–2019	Georgia XV	3	(0)
2020	Georgia	1	(0)
- Correct as of 11 August 2017

Sandro Svanidze (born 27 September 1998) is a Georgian rugby union player. He plays as Wing for RC Armazi in Georgia Championship Didi 10. He was called in Georgia U20 squad for 2018 World Rugby Under 20 Championship.
