= Manueli Ratuniyarawa =

Fiji international rugby union player

Rugby union career
- Position: Back-row / Lock
International career
Years	Team	Apps	(Points)
2020	Fiji	1	(0)

Manueli Ratuniyarawa is a Fijian international rugby union player.

Ratuniyarawa comes from Korotogo, Baravi, Nadroga, and is a cousin of rugby player Jasa Veremalua. He was educated at Sigatoka Methodist Primary and Queen Victoria School.

Primarily a flanker, Ratuniyarawa plays in the Skipper Cup with Nadroga and in 2020 gained a call up to the Fiji squad for their Autumn Nations Cup campaign. He debuted off the bench in a win over Georgia at Murrayfield.

Ratuniyarawa works as a police officer and is a 2024 graduate of Fiji National University.

== See also ==
- List of Fiji national rugby union players
