= Pierre Gayraud =

French rugby player (born 1992)

- Born: Pierre Gayraud; 27 April 1992 (age 34) France
- Height: 1.98 m (6 ft 6 in)
- Weight: 116 kg (18 st 4 lb)

Rugby union career
- Position: Lock
Senior career
Years	Team	Apps	(Points)
2013–2017	Bayonne	38	(5)
2017–2018	Bordeaux Bègles	4	(0)
2018–2019	Toulouse		
2019–	Grenoble		
- Correct as of 12 November 2016

Pierre Gayraud (born 27 April 1992) is a French professional rugby union player. He plays at lock for Grenoble in the Top 14.
