= Beka Saghinadze =

- Born: 29 October 1998 (age 28) Tbilisi, Georgia
- Height: 1.92 m (6 ft 4 in)
- Weight: 109 kg (17 st 2 lb)

Rugby union career
- Position(s): Flanker, Number 8
Senior career
Years	Team	Apps	(Points)
2017–2018	Lelo Saracens	7	(5)
2018–2021	Aurillac	23	(10)
2021–	Lyon OU	63	(50)
- Correct as of 16 July 2021
International career
Years	Team	Apps	(Points)
2015–2017	Georgia U18	12	(10)
2017–2018	Georgia U20	7	(5)
2019–	Georgia	50	(25)
- Correct as of 16 July 2021

Beka Saghinadze (born 29 October 1998) is a Georgian rugby union player who plays as a flanker for Aurillac in the French Pro D2. He was called up to the Georgia under-20 squad for 2017 World Rugby Under 20 Championship.

== Biography ==
He participates with the Georgia team in the 2015 European Rugby Union Under-18 Championship, where he goes with his team to the final. He is recalled again for the 2016 edition of the competition.

In 2017, he was called up to compete in the World Juniors held in Georgia. The same year, he made his debut in Didi 10 with Lelo Saracens Tbilisi. At the end of his first season with the seniors, he was again selected for the World Juniors.

Following the World Cup, he left for France and joined the Stade Aurillacois, within the club's hopeful workforce. He made his Pro D2 debut in December 2018, coming into play against Aviron Bayonnais.

In early 2019, he won his first selection with Georgia, against Romania. In September, he is in the group that participates in the World Cup in Japan. He played four games there, including two as a starter.

In early 2020, he scored his first try with Georgia against Portugal. At the end of the year, he started in the four matches of the Nations Cup of autumn, including a double against Fiji. In a club, he established himself as a starter, and thus won a contract at a higher level. He signed a three-year contract in favor of Lyon OU from 2021.
