= Daniel Bibi Biziwu =

French rugby union player

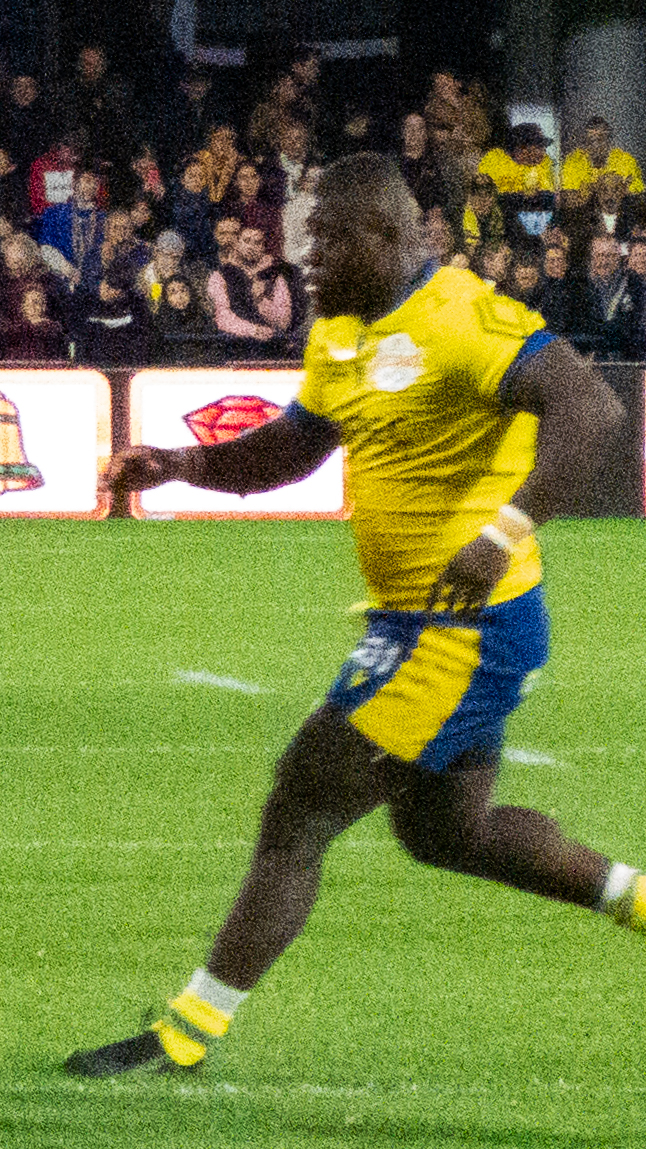
- Born: Daniel Bibi Biziwu; 29 August 2001 (age 25) Viry-Châtillon, France
- Height: 1.83 m (6 ft 0 in)
- Weight: 112 kg (17 st 9 lb)

Rugby union career
- Position: Loosehead prop
- Current team: Clermont
Amateur team(s)
Years	Team	Apps	(Points)
2008–2013	ES Viry-Châtillon		
2013–2018	Massy		
2018–2020	Clermont		
Senior career
Years	Team	Apps	(Points)
2020–	Clermont	18	(0)
- Correct as of 16 January 2022
International career
Years	Team	Apps	(Points)
2021	France U20	3	(0)
- Correct as of 13 July 2021

Daniel Bibi Biziwu (born 29 August 2001) is a French rugby union player, currently playing in the prop for Top 14 side Clermont.

== Career ==
Having started rugby at ES Viry-Châtillon in 2008, Bibi Biziwu played at RC Massy from 2013 to 2018, eventually joining Top 14 side ASM Clermont Auvergne in 2018.
