= Levan Maisashvili =

Georgian professional rugby union coach

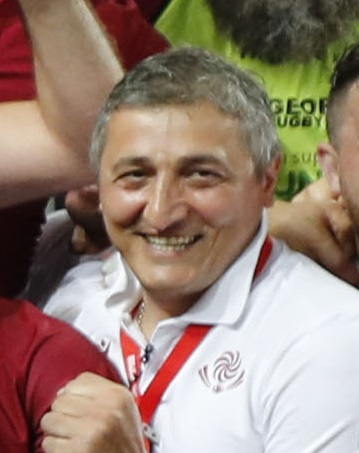
- Born: Georgia

Rugby union career
- Position: Head coach
- Current team: Black Lion
Coaching career
- Years: Team
- 1994–2001: Lelo Saracens (Assistant coach)
- 2000–2003: Georgia U-19 (Assistant coach)
- 2001–2020: Lelo Saracens
- 2003–2006: Georgia U-19
- 2006–2007: Georgia U-18
- 2007–2008: Georgia U-20
- 2008–2014: Georgia XV
- 2009: Georgia U-19
- 2014–2018: Emerging Georgia
- 2018–2019: Georgia (Assistant coach)
- 2020: Georgia (interim)
- 2021–2023: Georgia
- 2021–2023: Black Lion
- 2023–2024: Black Lion (interim)

Levan Maisashvili (Georgian: ლევან მაისაშვილი) is a Georgian professional rugby union coach. He was the head coach of the Georgia and the Black Lion side that participates in the EPCR Challenge Cup and Rugby Europe Super Cup. While coach of the Georgian national team during the 2021 July rugby union tests, Maisashvili contracted COVID-19 and was seriously ill in hospital. He was in hospital for two months, after being placed on a ventilator with 'serious lung damage' having contracted the illness on 2 July 2021.

In 2023, he decided to leave the position of the national team head coach following the team's poor performance at 2023 Rugby World Cup. Currently he is a high performance director of Georgian Rugby Union.
