= Pierre Fouyssac =

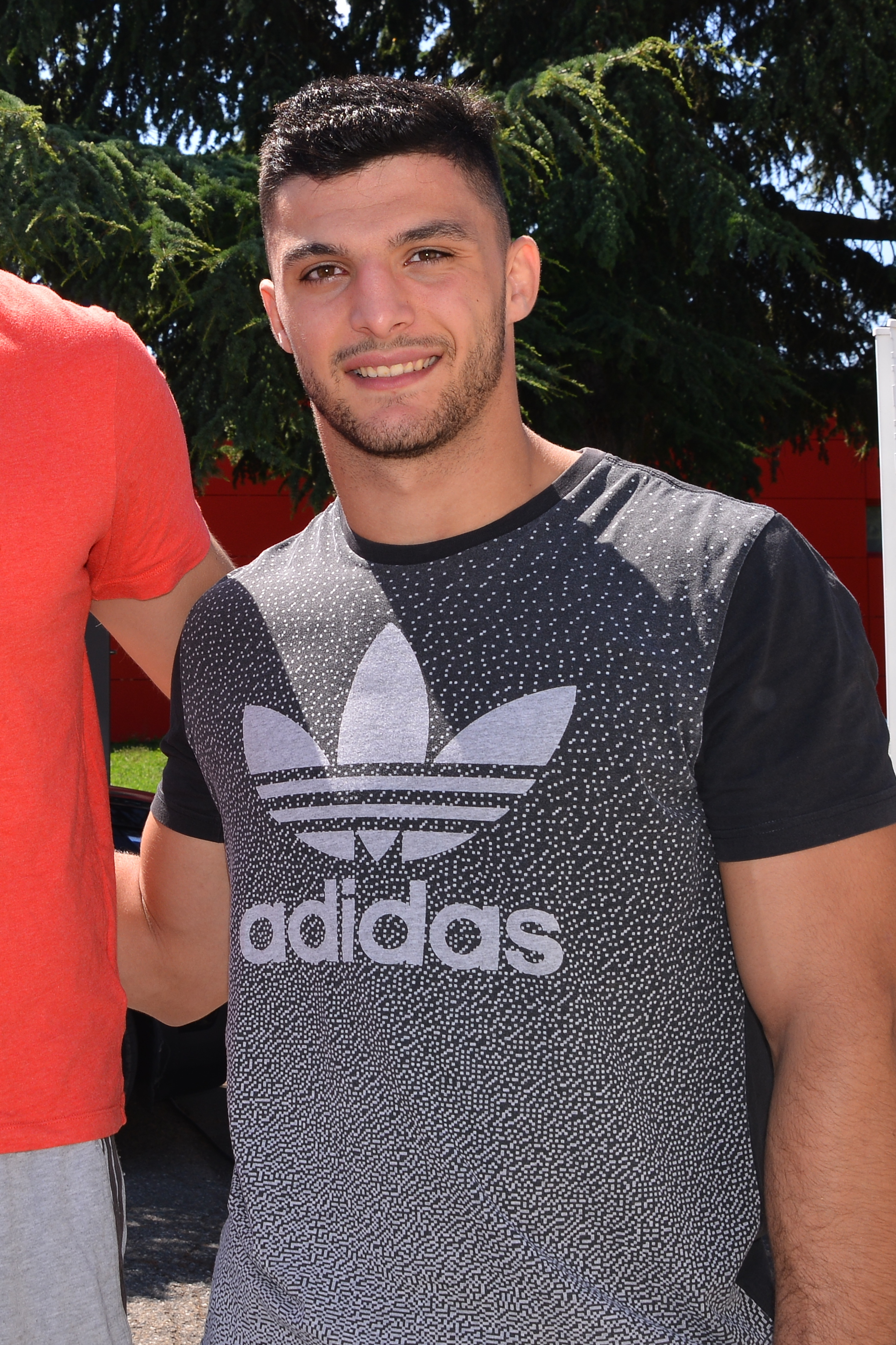
- Born: Pierre Fouyssac; 17 March 1995 (age 31) Agen, France
- Height: 1.89 m (6 ft 2 1/2 in)
- Weight: 110 kg (17 st 5 lb; 240 lb)

Rugby union career
- Position: Centre
- Current team: Toulouse
Youth career
- 2004–2010: US Lavardac Barbaste
- 2010–2015: Agen
Senior career
Years	Team	Apps	(Points)
2015–2018	Agen	60	(45)
2018–	Toulouse	40	(30)
- Correct as of 11 June 2022
International career
Years	Team	Apps	(Points)
2015	France U20	3	(10)
2018	French Barbarians	2	(0)
- Correct as of 11 June 2022
National sevens team
Years	Team		Comps
2014–	France		11
- Correct as of 11 June 2022

Pierre Fouyssac (born 17 March 1995) is a French rugby union player. He currently plays as a centre for Toulouse in the Top 14.

Born in Lot-et-Garonne, he began his career with Agen before moving to Toulouse in 2018.

== Honours ==
=== Toulouse ===
- Top 14: 2018–19, 2020–21
