= Matis Perchaud =

French rugby union player (born 2002)

- Born: 17 September 2002 (age 24) Mouguerre, France
- Height: 1.88 m (6 ft 2 in)
- Weight: 119 kg (262 lb)

Rugby union career
- Position: Loosehead prop
Youth career
- 2008–2017: US Mouguerre
- 2017–2020: Bayonne
Senior career
| Years | Team | Apps | (Points) |
| 2020–2024 | Bayonne | 74 | (5) |
| 2024– | Bordeaux Bègles | 11 | (5) |
- Correct as of 27 May 2025
International career
| Years | Team | Apps | (Points) |
| 2022 | France U20 | 5 | (0) |
- Correct as of 21 June 2022

Matis Perchaud (born 17 September 2002) is a French rugby union player, who plays for Bordeaux Bègles.

== Biograph ==
Matis Perchaud grew up in Mouguerre, where he first played rugby, before joining the Bayonne in 2017.

He made his debut with the first team during the 2020–21 season, playing his first games in Top 14 and even starting as a loosehead prop for a league game against Brive in February 2021. Soon after he signed a professional contract, tying him to the club until 2024.

He really became a regular starter in Pro D2 with Bayonne the following season, as they won direct promotion back to the Top 14. In 2022, he was also a standout player with France under-20s as they finished second in the Six Nations, only narrowly losing against the Irish grand slam winners.

Following this breakout season, he was first called to the France senior team in June 2022 for the summer tour of Japan.
