= Raphaël Chaume =

France international rugby union player (born 1989)

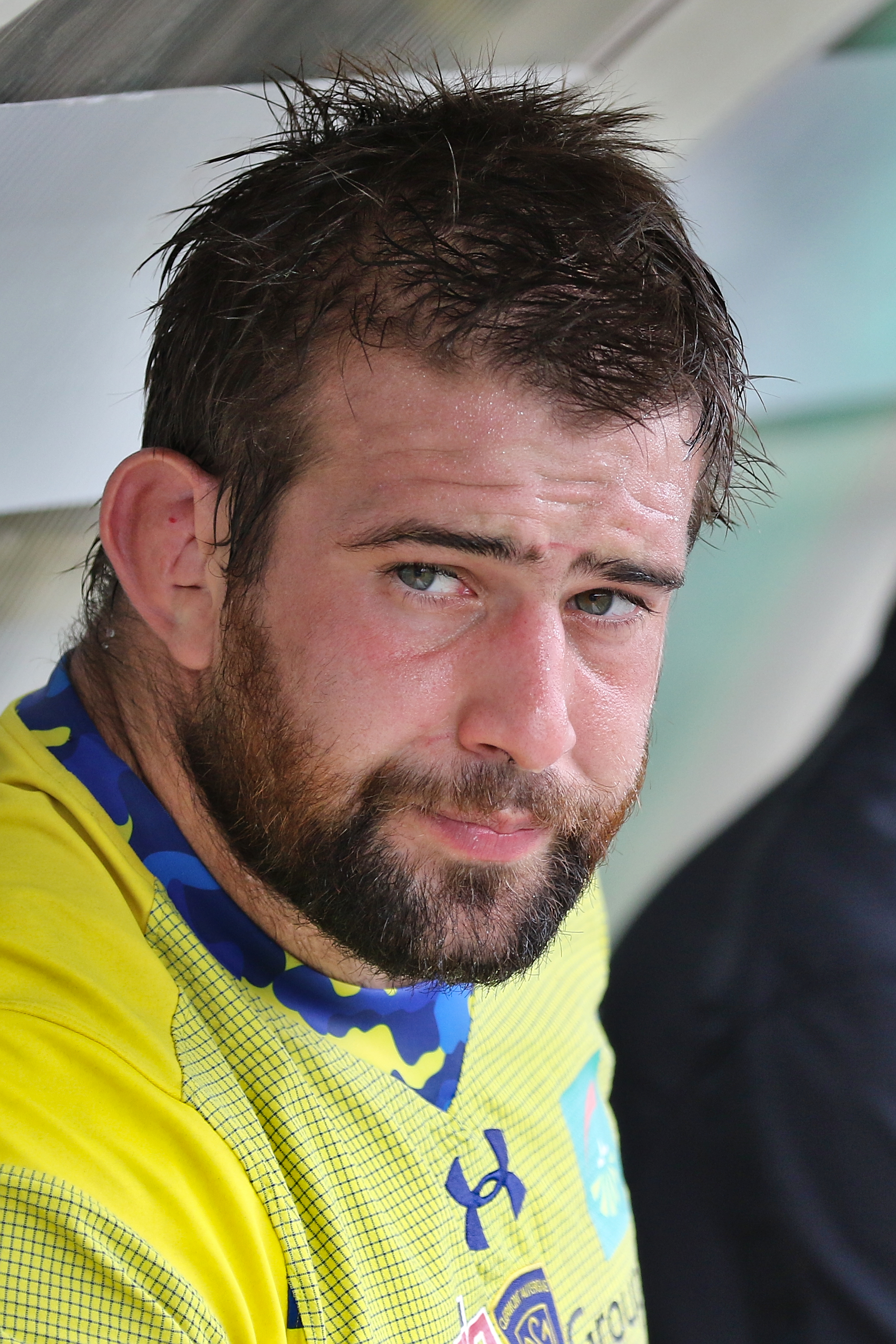
- Born: Raphaël Chaume; 29 November 1989 (age 36) Valréas, France
- Height: 1.85 m (6 ft 1 in)
- Weight: 106 kg (16 st 10 lb; 234 lb)

Rugby union career
- Position: Prop
Senior career
Years	Team	Apps	(Points)
2007–2008	Pays d'Aix	1	(0)
2009–18	Clermont	142	(10)
2018-	Lyon OU	31	(0)
- Correct as of 07 December 2019
International career
Years	Team	Apps	(Points)
2017–	France	1	(0)
- Correct as of 11 November 2017

Raphaël Chaume is a French professional rugby union player. He plays at prop for Clermont in the Top 14.
