= Olivier Klemenczak =

French rugby union footballer

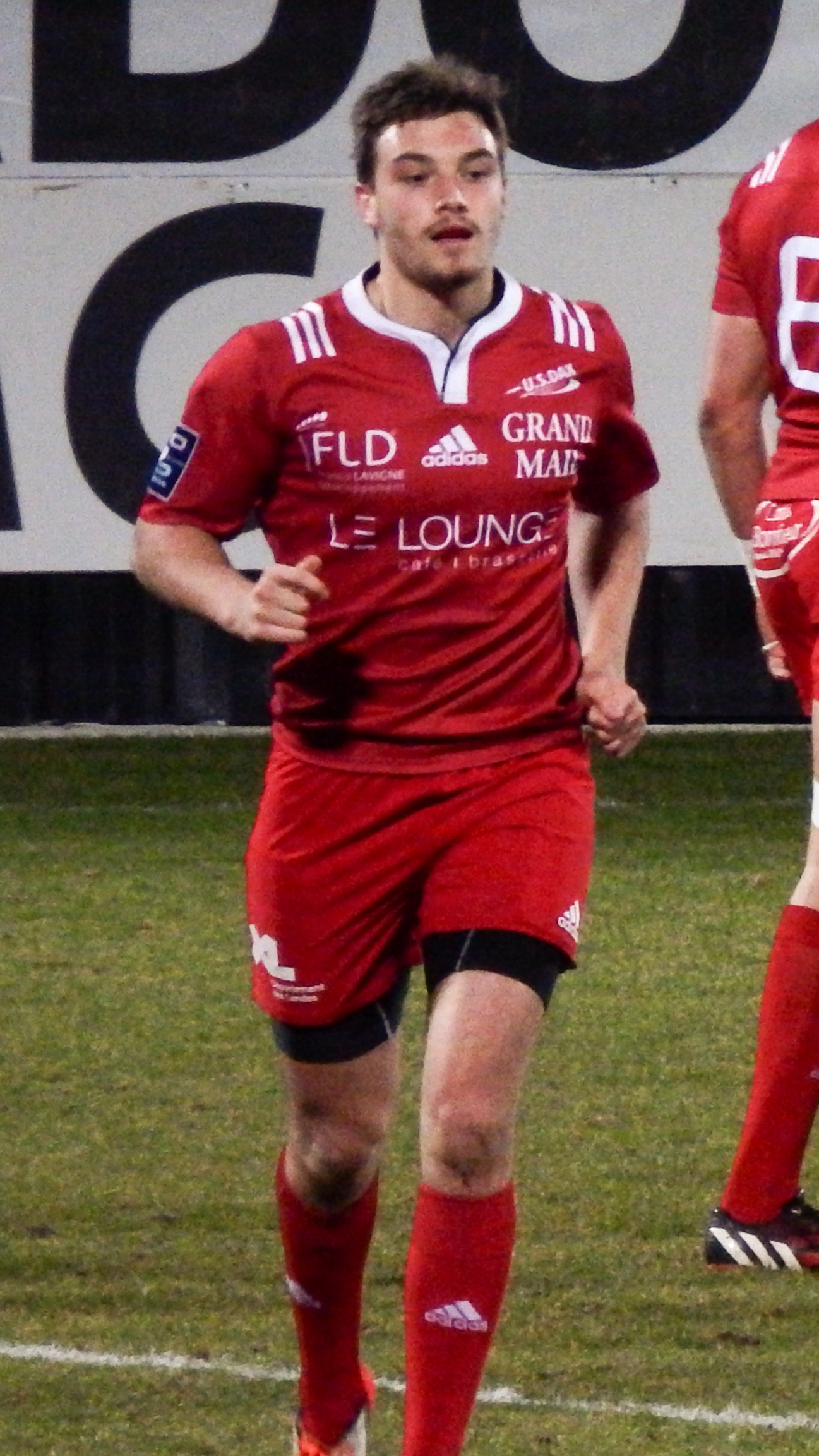
- Klemenczak with Dax in 2016
- Born: 1 June 1996 (age 30) Cormeilles-en-Parisis, France
- Height: 1.81 m (5 ft 11 in)
- Weight: 81 kg (179 lb)

Rugby union career
- Position: Centre
- Current team: Racing 92
Amateur team(s)
Years	Team	Apps	(Points)
–2011	AS Soustons		
2011–2014	Dax		
Senior career
Years	Team	Apps	(Points)
2014–2018	Dax	59	(30)
2018–	Racing 92	49	(40)
- Correct as of 26 September 2020
International career
Years	Team	Apps	(Points)
2015	France U20	2	(0)
- Correct as of 25 June 2015

Olivier Klemenczak (born 1 June 1996) is a French rugby union player who plays for Racing 92 in the Top 14 and the French national team. His position is centre.
