= Kylan Hamdaoui =

French rugby union player

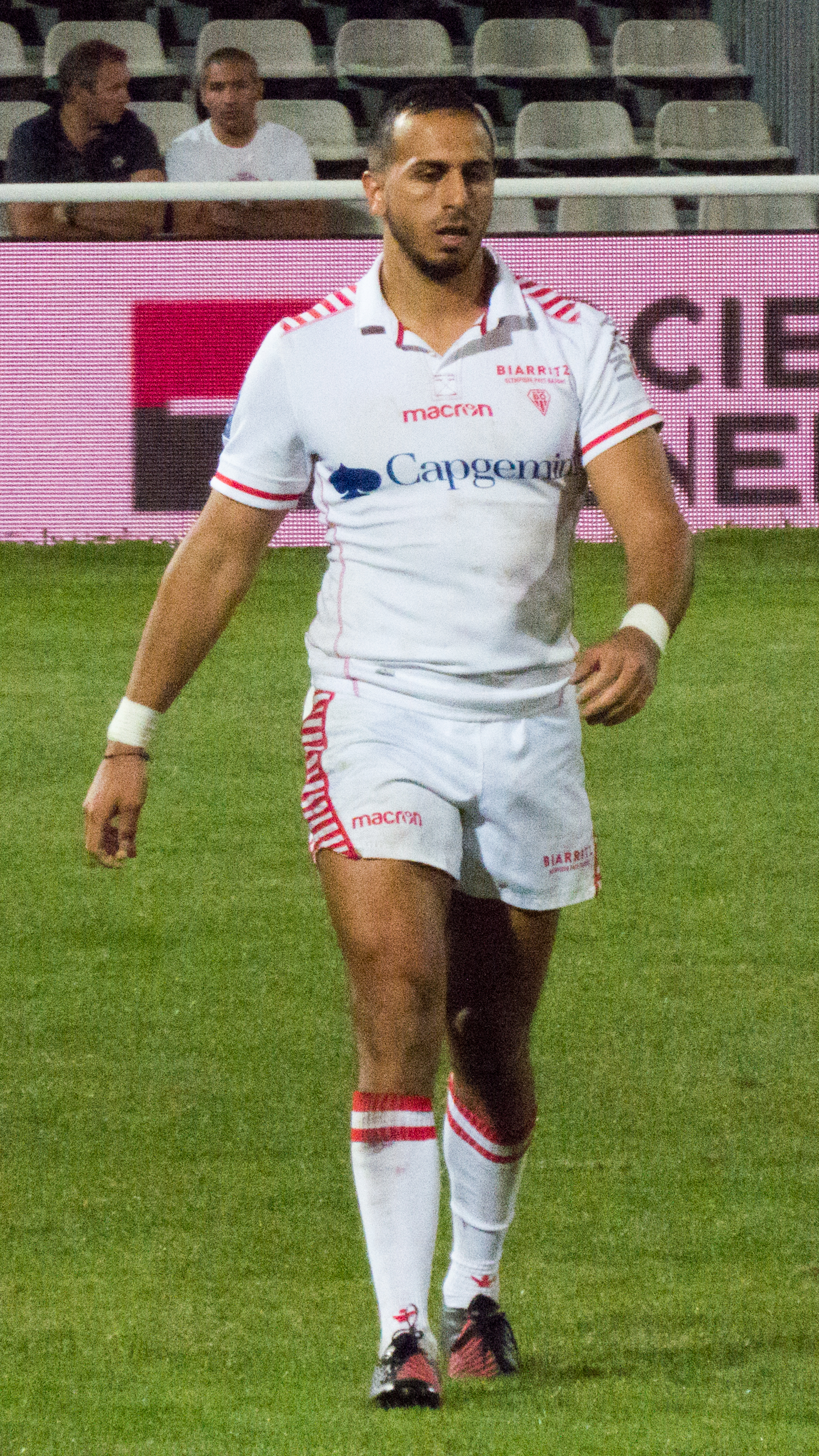
- Born: Kylan Hamdaoui; 15 April 1994 (age 32) Paris, France
- Height: 1.82 m (5 ft 11 1/2 in)
- Weight: 89 kg (14 st 0 lb)

Rugby union career
- Position: Full-back
- Current team: Stade Français
Amateur team(s)
| Years | Team | Apps | (Points) |
| 2012–2014 | Clermont | | |
Senior career
| Years | Team | Apps | (Points) |
| 2014–2018 | Biarritz | 90 | (125) |
| 2018–2024 | Stade Français | 135 | (170) |
- Correct as of 1 March 2020
International career
| Years | Team | Apps | (Points) |
| 2014 | France U20 | 9 | (10) |
| 2018 | French Barbarians | 1 | (0) |
- Correct as of 10 November 2018

Kylan Hamdaoui (born 15 April 1994) is a French rugby union full-back and he currently plays for Stade Français in the French Top 14.

== Personal life ==
Born in France, Hamdaoui is of Algerian descent.

== International honours ==
France (U20)

- Six Nations Under 20s Championship winners: 2014
