= Lekso Kaulashvili =

Georgian rugby union player

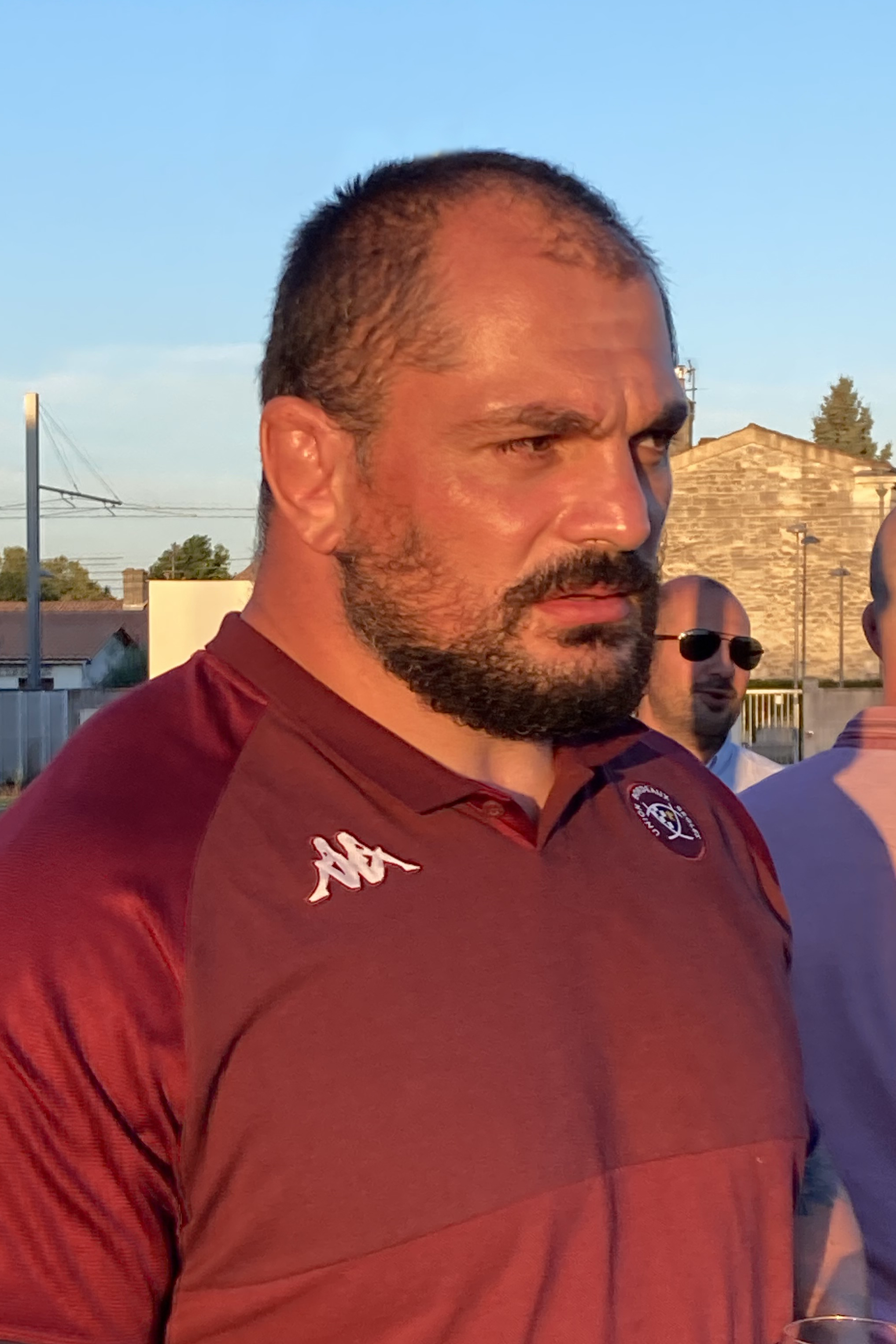
- Kaulashvili with Bordeaux Bègles in 2022
- Born: 27 August 1992 (age 34) Tbilisi, Georgia
- Height: 1.85 m (6 ft 1 in)
- Weight: 120 kg (260 lb; 18 st 13 lb)

Rugby union career
- Position: Tighthead prop
- Current team: Pau
Senior career
Years	Team	Apps	(Points)
2013–2018	La Rochelle	80	(20)
2018–2024	Bordeaux Bègles	110	(20)
2024–	Pau	8	(5)
- Correct as of 25 May 2025
International career
Years	Team	Apps	(Points)
2020–	Georgia	4	(0)
- Correct as of 29 November 2020

Lekso Kaulashvili (born August 27, 1992) is a Georgian rugby union player, who plays as a tighthead prop for French Top 14 club Pau and the Georgia national team.
