= Konstantin Mikautadze =

Georgia international rugby union player

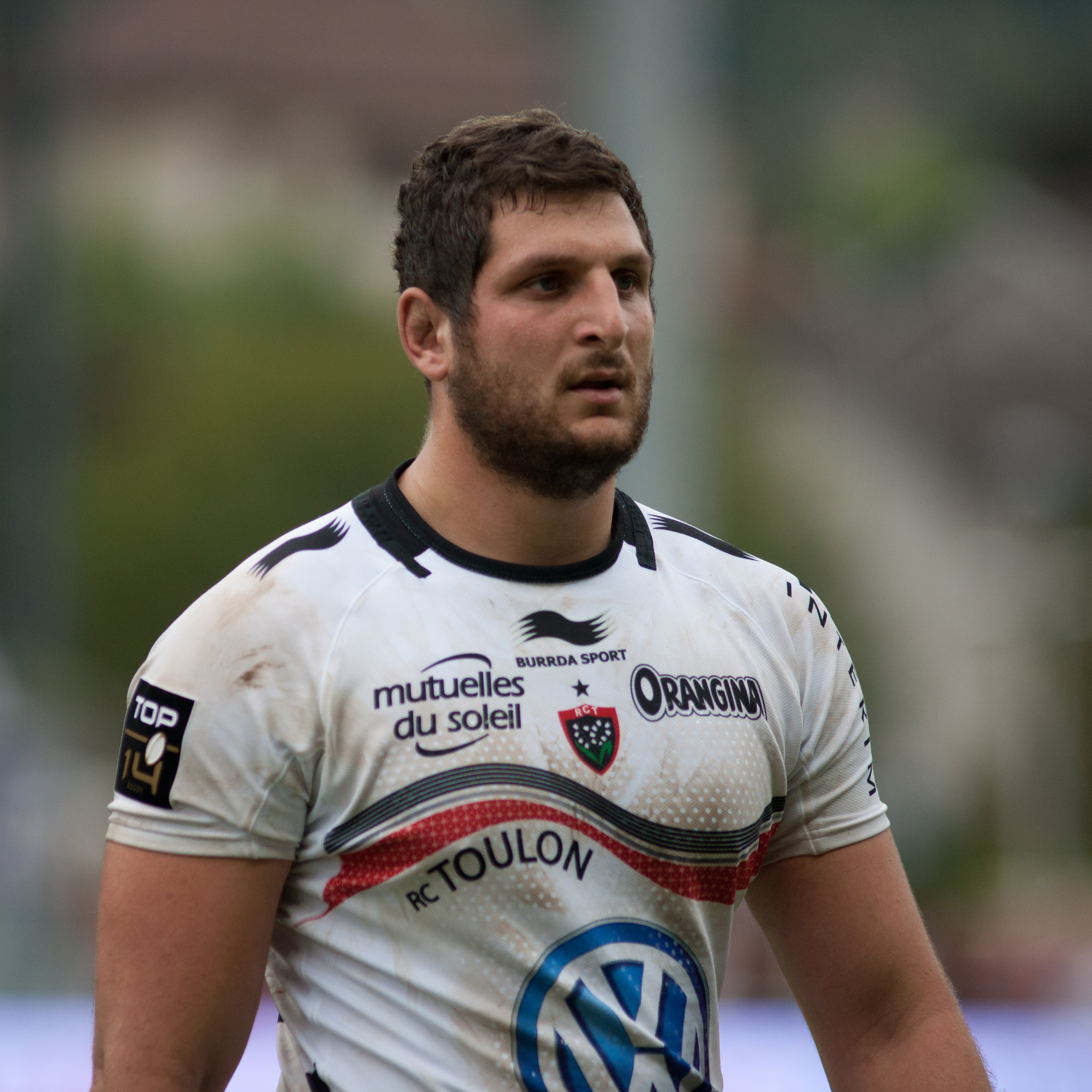
- Mikuatadze in 2013
- Born: Konstantin Mikautadze; 1 July 1991 (age 35) Sokhumi, Georgia
- Height: 2.00 m (6 ft 6 1/2 in)
- Weight: 128 kg (20 st 2 lb; 282 lb)

Rugby union career
- Position: Lock
Senior career
Years	Team	Apps	(Points)
2009–2010	Agen	20	(0)
2010–2016	Toulon	56	(10)
2016–2020	Montpellier	65	(5)
2020–	Bayonne	53	(5)
International career
Years	Team	Apps	(Points)
2010–	Georgia	77	(10)
–	Barbarians	2	(0)
- Correct as of 16 September 2019

Konstantin Mikautadze (born 1 July 1991 in Sokhumi, Georgia) is a Georgian rugby union player. He plays lock for Georgia on international level. Mikautadze also plays for French club, Toulon in the Top 14 competition.

== Career ==
On 11 July 2010, Mikautadze made his debut for Georgia against Scotland A in the IRB Nations Cup.

He made his debut for Barbarians against Ireland on 28 May 2015.

== Career statistics ==
As of match played 6 June 2015.

Club	Season	Top 14				Champions Cup				Total			
Club	Season	Apps	Tries	Yel	Red	Apps	Tries	Yel	Red	Apps	Tries	Yel	Red
RC Toulon	2011–12	1	1	0	0	0	0	0	0	1	1	0	0
RC Toulon	2012–13	3	0	0	0	0	0	0	0	3	0	0	0
RC Toulon	2013–14	10	0	0	1	5	0	0	0	15	0	0	1
RC Toulon	2014–15	12	0	0	0	1	0	0	0	13	0	0	0
Career total		26	1	0	1	6	0	0	0	32	1	0	1
