= Georgia XV national rugby union team =

Georgia XV საქართველო „XV“
- Union: Georgian Rugby Union
- Nickname: The Lelos ბორჯღალოსნები
- Emblem: Borjgali
- Founded: 2018
- Coach: (Georgia (country)) Besik Khamashuridze
- Captain: Giorgi Shkinin
Team kit	Change kit

The Georgia XV team are the second national rugby union team behind the Georgia national rugby union team. Georgia XV matches are usually used as a stepping stone up to Lelos selection. It was formed in 2018 by the Georgian Rugby Union.

== Summer Cup 2018 ==
2018 Summer Cup table
Pos	Team	Pld	W	D	L	PF	PA	PD	TF	TA	TB	LB	Pts
1	(France) Racing 92	2	2	0	0	59	15	+44	9	2	1	0	9
2	(Georgia (country)) Georgia XV	2	1	0	1	41	42	−1	5	6	0	1	5
3	Brazil	2	1	0	1	27	63	−36	4	10	0	0	4
4	Argentina XV	2	0	0	2	30	37	−7	4	4	0	2	2

== Record ==
=== Overall ===
Georgia XV has won 1 of their 3 representative matches, a winning record of 33.33%.

Below is table of the representative rugby matches played by a Georgia XV team at test level up until 16 March 2019.

Opponent	Played	Won	Lost	Drawn	Win %	For	Aga	Diff
Argentina XV	1	1	0	0	100.00%	23	22	+1
(Argentina) Jaguares	2	0	2	0	0.00%	10	132	-122
Brazil	1	0	1	0	0%	18	20	-2
England Counties XV	2	1	1	0	50%	39	51	-12
Poland	1	1	0	0	0%	52	26	+26
Russia A	1	0	1	0	0%	3	12	-9
