= 2021–22 EPCR Challenge Cup pool stage =

- Season: 2021–22 EPCR Challenge Cup
- Date: 10 December 2021 – 10 April 2022

Qualifiers

The 2021–22 EPCR Challenge Cup pool stage was the first stage of the competition in what was the eighth season of the EPCR Challenge Cup. The competition involved fifteen teams competing across three pools of five teams, for ten last 16 places. The three highest-ranked clubs from each pool and the highest-ranked fourth-placed club, joined the three clubs ranked 9 to 11 from each of the Heineken Champions Cup pools, in the Round of 16. The pool stage began on 10 December 2021 and was completed on 10 April 2022.

Several round 2 matches between teams from France and the UK were postponed. This was due to new travel restrictions between the UK and France introduced by the French government on 18 December 2021.

== Pool stage ==
The teams were allocated into three pools depending on where they finished in their respective leagues in the previous season.

Teams in the same pool will play each other once, each playing two home and two away games in the pool stage, and will receive a bye round. The pool stage will begin in December 2021, and continue through to April 2022, before the top three from each pool and the best fourth-placed side progress to the last 16.

Teams will be awarded competition points, based on match result. Teams receive four points for a win, two points for a draw, one attacking bonus point for scoring four or more tries in a match and one defensive bonus point for losing a match by seven points or fewer.

In the event of a tie between two or more teams, the following tie-breakers will be used, as directed by EPCR:

1. Where teams have played each other
  1. The club with the greater number of competition points from only matches involving tied teams.
  2. If equal, the club with the best aggregate points difference from those matches.
  3. If equal, the club that scored the most tries in those matches.
2. Where teams remain tied and/or have not played each other in the competition (i.e. are from different pools)
  1. The club with the best aggregate points difference from the pool stage.
  2. If equal, the club that scored the most tries in the pool stage.
  3. If equal, the club with the fewest players suspended in the pool stage.
  4. If equal, the drawing of lots will determine a club's ranking.

Key to colours
Winner, runner-up and third of each pool, advance to round of 16.
The highest-scoring fourth-place team also advance to round of 16.

=== Pool A ===
Pos	Team	Pld	W	D	L	PF	PA	PD	TF	TA	TB	LB	Pts
1	(France) Toulon	4	3	0	1	107	57	+50	13	7	3	1	16
2	(England) Newcastle Falcons	4	3	0	1	73	89	−16	10	10	2	0	14
3	(France) Biarritz	4	2	1	1	59	47	+12	8	4	1	1	12
4	(England) Worcester Warriors	4	1	1	2	85	91	−6	11	12	2	1	9
5	(Italy) Zebre Parma	4	0	0	4	75	115	−40	8	17	1	1	2

==== Round 1 ====
10 December 2021
20:00

(1 BP) Newcastle Falcons (England)	31–26	(England) Worcester Warriors (2 BP)
Try: Wright 1' c Brown 24' c McGuigan 40'+2 c Lindsay-Haugue 47' c Con: Haydon-Wood (4/4) 2', 26', 40'+3', 48'; Pen: Hodgson (1/1) 77'	Report	Try: Penalty try 7' van der Merwe 16' c Doel 30' c Chudley 66' m Con: Searle (2/2) 17', 31'

Kingston Park
Attendance: 3,431
Referee: Frank Murphy (Ireland)

11 December 2021
14:00

Zebre Parma (Italy)	13–26	(France) Biarritz (1 BP)
Try: Trulla 39' c Con: Rizzi (1/1) 40'; Pen: Rizzi (2/2) 5', 24'	Report	Try: Erbani 20' c Erdocia 36' c Tscheisvhili 48' m Scannell 67' c Con: Bosch (2/3) 21', 37'; Herron (1/1) 68'

Stadio Sergio Lanfranchi
Attendance: 200
Referee: Chris Busby (Ireland)

==== Round 2 ====
17 December 2021
21:00

(1 BP) Toulon (France)	28–14	(Italy) Zebre Parma
Try: Setiano 7' c Roux 40' c Serin 44' c Penalty try 63'; Con: Carbonel (3/3) 8', 40', 45'	Report	Try: Tuivuaka 34' c Bianchi 69' c Con: Canna (2/2) 35', 70'

Stade Mayol
Attendance: 500
Referee: Laurent Cardona (France)

18 December 2021
15:15

Worcester Warriors (England)	Cancelled; 0–0	(France) Biarritz

Sixways
Referee: Hollie Davidson (Scotland)

- Initially postponed (with the intent to reschedule) due to travel restrictions between UK and France, but later cancelled with a 0–0 draw verdict and 2 match points to each team.

==== Round 3 ====
14 January 2022
21:00

(1 BP) Biarritz (France)	13–17	(England) Newcastle Falcons
Try: Jalaghonia 63' c Con: Bosch (1/1) 65'; Pen: Herron (2/2) 34', 72'	Report	Try: Stuart 5' c Wacokecoke 80' c Con: Connon (2/2) 7', 80' c Pen: Connon (1/1) 47'

Parc des Sports Aguiléra
Attendance: 5,000
Referee: Adam Jones (Wales)

15 January 2022
17:30

Worcester Warriors (England)	23–34	(France) Toulon
Try: Van der Merwe 62' c Doel 67' c Con: Smith (2/2) 63', 78'; Pen: Smith (3/3) 2', 6', 24'	Report	Try: Du Preez 30' c Isa 36' c Villière 48' c Gigashvili 60' c Con: Belleau (4/4) 31', 38', 50', 61'; Pen: Belleau (2/2) 15', 44'

Sixways
Attendance: 9,000
Referee: Sam Grove-White (Scotland)

==== Round 4 ====
22 January 2022
16:15

(1 BP) Zebre Parma (Italy)	26–36	(England) Worcester Warriors (1 BP)
Try: Cronjé 31' c D'Onofrio 36' c Trulla 66' m Lucchin 78'; Con: O'Malley (2/2) 31', 38'	Report	Try: Annett (2) 3', 16' m Searle 33' c Howe 44' c Hill 57' c Con: Searle (4/4) 4', 34', 45', 58'; Pen: Searle (1/2) 70'

Stadio Sergio Lanfranchi
Attendance: 750
Referee: Hollie Davidson (Scotland)

22 January 2022
21:00

Toulon (France)	Cancelled; 28–0	(England) Newcastle Falcons

Stade Mayol
Referee: Gianluca Gnecchi (Italy)

- Toulon awarded the 5 match points and a 28–0 victory following COVID cases within the Newcastle Falcons team.

==== Round 5 ====
9 April 2022
20:00

(1 BP) Newcastle Falcons (England)	25–22	(Italy) Zebre Parma (1 BP)
Try: Davison 17' m Burrell 28' m McGuigan 58' m Nordli-Kelemeti 79' c Con: Connon (1/4) 80+2'; Pen: Connon (1/1) 40+3'	Report	Try: Andreani 46' c Con: Andreani (1/1) 47'; Pen: Rizzi (5/5) 2', 13', 15', 25', 55'

Kingston Park
Attendance: 3,200
Referee: Ludovic Cayre (France)

9 April 2022
21:00

Biarritz (France)	20–17	(France) Toulon
Try: Barry 4' c Speight 13' m Kuridrani 53' m Con: Bosch (1/3) 5'; Pen: Bosch (1/1) 66'	Report	Try: Salles 49' m Pen: Belleau (4/4) 16', 22', 29', 45'

Parc des Sports Aguiléra
Attendance: 7,000
Referee: Andrea Piardi (Italy)

=== Pool B ===
Pos	Team	Pld	W	D	L	PF	PA	PD	TF	TA	TB	LB	Pts
1	(France) Lyon	4	4	0	0	122	57	+65	14	5	2	0	18
2	(England) Gloucester	4	3	0	1	161	84	+77	23	10	3	1	16
3	(Italy) Benetton	4	2	0	2	75	95	−20	9	12	0	0	8
4	(France) Perpignan	4	1	0	3	54	138	−84	7	18	0	0	4
5	(Wales) Dragons	4	0	0	4	74	112	−38	7	15	0	2	2

==== Round 1 ====
10 December 2021
21:00

Lyon (France)	19–13	(England) Gloucester (1 BP)
Try: Taufua 47' c Con: Doussain (1/1) 49'; Pen: Doussain (3/4) 11', 25', 59'; Pélissé (1/1) 71'	Report	Try: Jordan 60' c Con: Twelvetrees (1/1) 61'; Pen: Twelvetrees (2/2) 19', 46'

Matmut Stadium de Gerland
Attendance: 7,000
Referee: Gianluca Gnecchi (Italy)

11 December 2021
18:30

Perpignan (France)	22–16	(Wales) Dragons
Try: Penalty try 55'; Ecochard 62' c Plana 67' m Con: Ecochard (1/2) 63'; Pen: Ecochard (1/1) 66'	Report	Try: Roberts 73' c Con: S. Davies (1/1) 74'; Pen: S. Davies (3/3) 8', 21', 53'

Stade Aimé Giral
Attendance: 5,455
Referee: Christophe Ridley (England)

==== Round 2 ====
17 December 2021
20:00

Dragons (Wales)	28–41	(France) Lyon (1 BP)
Try: Doge 40' c Seiuli 46' m Wainwright 57' c Con: S. Davies (2/3) 40', 58'; Pen: S. Davies (3/4) 18', 29', 64'	Report	Try: Dumortier (2) 10' m, 41' c Parisien 20' c Pélissié 35' c Con: Berdeu (3/4) 21', 36', 42'; Pen: Berdeu (5/6) 26', 61', 67', 73', 80'

Rodney Parade
Attendance: 3,025
Referee: Craig Maxwell-Keys (England)

17 December 2021
20:00

(1 BP) Gloucester (England)	54–25	(Italy) Benetton
Try: Singleton 19' m Meehan 24' c Reid 29' c Alemanno 41' c Penalty try 50'; Varney 58' c May 67' c Clement 74' c Con: Hastings (4/5) 26', 30', 42', 58'; Evans (2/2) 68', 74'	Report	Try: R. Smith 35' c Negri 40' m Morisi 63' c Con: R. Smith (2/3) 37', 63'; Pen: R. Smith (2/3) 9', 13'

Kingsholm
Attendance: 9,050
Referee: Craig Evans (Wales)

==== Round 3 ====
15 January 2022
16:15

Benetton (Italy)	23–9	(Wales) Dragons
Try: Herbst 13' m Padovani 55' c Baravalle 75' m Con: R. Smith (1/2) 56'; Pen: R. Smith (2/3) 21', 70'	Report	Pen: S. Davies (3/3) 2', 24', 40'

Stadio Comunale di Monigo
Attendance: 1,000
Referee: Pierre Baptiste Nuchy (France)

15 January 2022
21:00

Perpignan (France)	6–37	(France) Lyon (1 BP)
Pen: Rodor (2/2) 11', 40'	Report	Try: R. Taofifénua 22' c Couilloud 41' c Niniashvili 50' m Laporte 74' c Charcosset 76' m Con: Sopoaga (2/3) 23', 42'; Berdeu (1/2) 75'; Pen: Sopoaga (1/1) 34'

Stade Aimé Giral
Attendance: 5,000
Referee: Nika Amashukeli (Georgia)

==== Round 4 ====
21 January 2022
21:00

Lyon (France)	25–10	(Italy) Benetton
Try: Kaabèche 14' c Dumortier 30' m Mignot 74' c Con: Berdeu (1/2) 15'; Sopoaga (1/1) 75'; Pen: Berdeu (1/1) 25'; Sopoaga (1/2) 73'	Report	Try: Brex 17' c Con: Marin (1/1) 27'; Pen: Marin (1/1) 37'

Matmut Stadium de Gerland
Attendance: 5,000
Referee: Ian Tempest (England)

22 January 2022
17:30

(1 BP) Gloucester (England)	68–19	(France) Perpignan
Try: Ludlow 6' c Moyle 10' c Reid (2) 20' m, 48' m Socino 28' c Atkinson 35' c Varney 54' c Singleton 70' c Harris 74' c Rees-Zammit 78' c Con: Hastings (4/6) 7', 11', 29', 36'; Evans (4/4) 54', 70', 74', 79'	Report	Try: Lam 14' c Seguela (2) 23' m, 51' c Con: Rodor (2/3) 15', 52'

Kingsholm
Attendance: 14,000
Referee: Ben Blain (Scotland)

==== Round 5 ====
9 April 2022
16:15

Benetton (Italy)	17–7	(France) Perpignan
Try: Albornoz 51' c Els 60' c Con: Albornoz (2/2) 52', 60'; Pen: Da Re (1/1) 5'	Report	Try: Sawailau 38' c Con: Rodor (1/1) 40'

Stadio Comunale di Monigo
Attendance: 800
Referee: Adam Leal (England)

9 April 2022
20:00

Dragons (Wales)	21–26	(England) Gloucester
Try: Basham 18' c Rosser 26' c Keddie 40+2' c Con: S. Davies (3/3) 19', 27', 40+3'	Report	Try: Socino (3) 13' c, 62' c, 67' c Rees-Zammit 36' m Con: Barton (1/2) 14'; Twelvetrees (2/2) 63', 68'

Rodney Parade
Attendance: 5,737
Referee: Tual Trainini (France)

=== Pool C ===
Pos	Team	Pld	W	D	L	PF	PA	PD	TF	TA	TB	LB	Pts
1	(Scotland) Edinburgh	4	3	0	1	161	47	+114	22	6	2	1	15
2	(England) London Irish	4	2	1	1	78	82	−4	12	11	2	0	12
3	(England) Saracens	4	2	0	2	118	78	+40	17	11	2	1	11
4	(France) Brive	4	1	1	2	41	146	−105	4	21	0	0	6
5	(France) Pau	4	1	0	3	75	120	−45	10	16	1	0	5

==== Round 1 ====
11 December 2021
15:15

(1 BP) Saracens (England)	18–21	(Scotland) Edinburgh
Try: Goode 14' m Christie 27' c Con: Man. Vunipola (1/2) 28'; Pen: Man. Vunipola (2/2) 42', 58'	Report	Try: Moyano 23' c Nel 67' c Con: Boffelli (1/2) 24'; Pen: Boffelli (3/4) 4', 18', 52'

StoneX Stadium
Attendance: 9,000
Referee: Tual Trainini (France)

11 December 2021
21:00

Pau (France)	17–33	(England) London Irish (1 BP)
Try: Levron 58' c Joseph 78' c Con: Levron (2/2) 59', 79'; Pen: Levron (1/1) 14'	Report	Try: Penalty try 12'; Creevy (2) 20' c, 47' c Cracknell (2) 75' m, 80'+1 c Con: Jennings (2/2) 22', 48'; Jackson (1/2) 80'+3

Stade du Hameau
Attendance: 4,067
Referee: Sam Grove-White (Scotland)

==== Round 2 ====
18 December 2021
21:00

Pau (France)	Cancelled; 28–0	(England) Saracens

Stade du Hameau
Referee: Chris Busby (Ireland)

- Pau awarded the 5 match points and a 28–0 victory following COVID cases within the Saracens team.

19 December 2021
15:15

London Irish (England)	Cancelled; 0–0	(France) Brive

Brentford Community Stadium
Referee: Ben Blain (Scotland)

- Initially postponed (with the intent to reschedule) due to travel restrictions between UK and France, but later cancelled with a 0–0 draw verdict and 2 match points to each team.

==== Round 3 ====
14 January 2022
21:00

Brive (France)	33–25	(France) Pau
Try: Japaridze 21' c Jurand 37' c Penalty try 55'; Con: Laranjeira (2/2) 22', 39'; Pen: Laranjeira (4/4) 11', 28', 35', 51'	Report	Try: Le Bail 57' c Puech 45' m Vatubua 77' c Con: Le Bail (1/2) 58'; Debaes (1/1) 78'; Pen: Le Bail (2/3) 17', 30'

Stade Amédée-Domenech
Attendance: 5,000
Referee: Adrien Descottes (France)

15 January 2022
15:15

London Irish (England)	21–20	(Scotland) Edinburgh (1 BP)
Try: Rowe 24' c Hoskins 44' c Cracknell 77' c Con: Jackson (3/3) 26', 45', 78'	Report	Try: McBurney 22' c Moyano 31' c Con: Boffelli (2/2) 22', 32'; Pen: Van der Walt (2/2) 39', 61'

Brentford Community Stadium
Attendance: 1,000
Referee: Gianluca Gnecchi (Italy

==== Round 4 ====
21 January 2022
20:00

(1 BP) Edinburgh (Scotland)	66–3	(France) Brive
Try: Young 5' c Ritchie 27' c Graham 33' m Owsley (2) 37' c, 41' c Muncaster 52' c Watson 66' m Bennett 72' c Pyrgos 80+1' c Con: Boffelli (6/7) 6', 27', 30', 38', 42', 53'; Savala (2/2) 73', 80+1'	Report	Pen: Laranjeira (1/1) 3'

Edinburgh Rugby Stadium
Attendance: 7,000
Referee: Craig Maxwell-Keys (England)

23 January 2022
15:15

(1 BP) Saracens (England)	45–24	(England) London Irish (1 BP)
Try: Maitland 13' m Lewington (2) 24' c, 30' c Daly 33' m Koch 53' c Beaton 75' c Mawi 80' c Con: Man. Vunipola (5/7) 26', 32', 53', 76', 80'	Report	Try: Stokes 9' c Redmond 19' c González 44' m Arundell 77' m Con: Jennings (1/1) 10' van Rensburg (1/3) 19'

StoneX Stadium
Attendance: 7,500
Referee: Adam Jones (Wales)

==== Round 5 ====
8 April 2022
20:00

(1 BP) Edinburgh (Scotland)	54–5	(France) Pau
Try: McInally 3' c Boyle (2) 10' m, 21' c Pyrgos 32' c Nel 40' c Moyano (2) 46' c, 79' c Phillips 69' c Con: Van der Walt (6/7) 4', 22', 33', 40+1', 47', 70'; Savala (1/1) 80'	Report	Try: Carol 78' m

Edinburgh Rugby Stadium
Attendance: 6,108
Referee: Sara Cox (England)

8 April 2022
21:00

Brive (France)	5–55	(England) Saracens (1 BP)
Try: Tuicuvu 14' m	Report	Try: Christie 10' m Mawi 22' c Isiekwe 35' c Van Zyl 41' c Earl 58' c Segun 62' m George 70' c Harris 75' c Con: Farrell (6/8) 23', 36', 42', 59', 71', 76'; Pen: Farrell (1/1) 6'

Stade Amédée-Domenech
Attendance: 6,000
Referee: Mike Adamson (Scotland)
