= Joel Kpoku =

English rugby union lock

- Born: Joel Awanka S. Kpoku; 22 June 1999 (age 27) London Borough of Newham, London, England
- Height: 6 ft 6 in (1.98 m)
- Weight: 19 st 12 lb (126 kg)
- School: Ashmole Academy
- University: Oaklands College

Rugby union career
- Position: Lock
- Current team: Section Paloise
Senior career
Years	Team	Apps	(Points)
2017–2018	→ Old Albanians	2	(5)
2018–2019	→ Ampthill	2	(5)
2018–2021	Saracens	9	(20)
2021–2024	Lyon	50	(20)
2024–	Section Paloise	0	(0)
- Correct as of 8 May 2019
International career
Years	Team	Apps	(Points)
2018–2019	England U20s	15	(10)
- Correct as of 8 May 2019

Joel Awanka S. Kpoku (born 22 June 1999) is an English-born Congolese rugby union lock who currently plays for Section Paloise in the French Top 14.

Kpoku began playing rugby at school and joined rugby league side London Skolars at age 12. He then joined Saracens Amateur RFC in 2013 before being selected for the Saracens academy at under-17s. While studying at Oaklands College as a member of the Oaklands Wolves Rugby Academy, Kpoku impressed and toured South Africa with the Saracens Amateurs U17 team in 2016. He was called up for England training in August 2018 after a notable performance in the 2018 World Rugby Under 20 Championship.

== Biography ==
=== Early life and education ===
Joel Kpoku was born on 22 June 1999 in London, specifically in the borough of Newham, to Congolese parents, which is why Joel Kpoku's first language is French. Kpoku grew up in Hackney, along with his twin brother Jonathan Kpoku and his younger brother Junior Kpoku.

Growing up in Hackney, Joel Kpoku had never had the chance to see a rugby ball before moving to Southgate and discovering the sport in Year 7. Initially, he was reluctant and "hated getting dirty," but he gradually developed an interest in rugby. With his brother Jonathan Kpoku, he was spotted by the London Skolars, a rugby league team. Richard Hill played a key role in recruiting the two brothers to the Saracens, joining the academy.

=== Professional career ===
==== Early days with Saracens ====
Joel Kpoku's professional career began promisingly in England with the Saracens when he was 19, scoring a try against the Leicester Tigers in his debut appearance in October 2018. During this first season, Kpoku played ten matches for Saracens and ten more with the England U20 rugby team. At the end of the season, Kpoku competed in the World Rugby U20 Championship alongside players such as Marcus Smith and impressed observers despite losing in the final to the France U20 rugby team of Cameron Woki, Romain Ntamack, and Demba Bamba. The following season, Joel Kpoku made 27 appearances, including 12 as a starter. However, his third season proved more challenging due to the COVID-19 pandemic and a complex situation within the club, due to Saracens' relegation. He only participated in seven matches for the Sarries. As a promising player, he was identified by the British press as one of the young English players expected to renew the Red Rose squad. Kpoku was thus called up for a full England training session in August 2018 by Eddie Jones. In May 2020, he extended his contract with the Saracens by signing a two-year deal, which included his promotion from the academy to the first team. However, his playing time was limited and he decided to leave his formative club in search of more game time.

==== Kpoku joins Top 14 with LOU ====
On 19 November 2021, Joel Kpoku left the Saracens to join Lyon OU, replacing Etienne Oosthuizen, who had retired for health reasons. In his first season with LOU, Kpoku played only six matches, three of them as a starter. In his debut match for LOU, on 27 December 2021 at the Stade Marcel-Deflandre against La Rochelle, he suffered a serious knee injury in the 33rd minute. Medical examinations revealed a tear of the tibial collateral ligament as well as a syndesmosis in the ankle. From the following season, Kpoku established himself as a key player for the team. In May 2022, he was part of the team that won the 2021–22 EPCR Challenge Cup pool stage. Kpoku and his teammates triumphed over Toulon in the final, giving LOU their first European title in history.

==== New start at Section Paloise ====
In June 2024, he signed a contract with Section Paloise until June 2027. Despite an offer to extend his contract with LOU, Joel Kpoku chose to join the sectionniste project led by Sébastien Piqueronies, which is being rebuilt after the retirement of Sam Whitelock.

== Personal life ==
Kpoku has Congolese heritage and speaks fluent French. He has two rugby-playing brothers: Jonathan Kpoku and Junior Kpoku.

Joel Kpoku has a twin brother, Jonathan Kpoku, who plays for the Sporting Club Albigeois, and another brother, Junior, who plays for Racing 92. Born in England to Congolese parents, the Kpoku brothers are all fluent in French.

In February 2019, he was shortlisted for the Premiership Rugby Cup Breakthrough Player Award.

== Honours ==
- RFU Championship winner with Saracens (2021)
- EPCR Challenge Cup winner with Lyon (2022)
