= Étoile sportive catalane =

(France) Étoile sportive catalane
- Full name: Stade Dijonnais Côte D'Or
- Founded: 1912
- Location: Avenue de la Libération; 66700 Argelès-sur-Mer
- Ground: Stade Gaston Pams (Capacity: 1500)
- President: Gérard Broc
- Coach(es): Alain Teixidor; Cédric Berget; Jean-Laurent Cazes
- League: Fédérale 2,
Team kit

Official website
- www.etoile-sportive-catalane.com

L'Étoile sportive catalane is a rugby union club based in France at Argelès-sur-Mer. It plays in Fédérale 2, the fourth level of French rugby union.

== History ==
The club was founded in 1912 as Union sportive argelésienne, in 1921, became Grenouille argelésienne, then Étoile sportive argelésienne, and in the 90's Étoile sportive catalane.

In the 60's the club played in regional championship and was promoted in third (Excellence) in 1968. Winning the title in 1970, was promoted in second division, returning in the third in 1976. In the 90's was promoted in group A2 and from there in 1996 arrived to play the eights of finals for the title of French Champion, losing against Toulose).

This could permit to the club to play in 1996–97 in first division, but the Board of the club refused, due economics difficulties.

== Palmarès ==
- 1964 and 1967 : Champion of Roussillon Honneur (4th div)
- 1970 : Champion of France "Excellence" (3rd national division)
- 1971 : Eights of finals in the second division championship
- 1996 : Eights of finals in the 1995–96 French Championship
- 2005 : Finalist of Fédérale 2 championship

== Famous players ==
- Marc Lièvremont formed in the club
- Thomas Lièvremont formed in the club
- Matthieu Lièvremont formed in the club
- Sylvain Deroeux (1996–1997)
- Nicolas Mas formed in the club
- Benoit Cabello (jusqu'en 2002) formed in the club
- Olivier Benassis formed in the club
- Jérôme Schuster formed in the club
- Vincent Sabardeil (2005–)
- Patrick Arlettaz (2006–2007)
- Benjamin Goze (2006–2007)
- Sébastien Mercier (2007–2008 2009–..)
- Diego Giannantonio (2008–2009)
- Nicolas Grelon (2009–2011)
- Bruno Rolland
- Fabien Sabathier
- Thomas Bouquié (2011–2012)

=== Roster ===
hooker

- Laurent Gironella
- Romain Granal
- Yohann Stroniaz

Props

- Eric Sanz
- Benjamin Jimenez
- Jerome Berget
- Jerome Martinez
- Alexis Evra
- Janik Aulet

Lock-on

- Jean-Marc Fiches
- Mehdi Ameur
- Benjamin Goze
- Christophe Nou
- Laurent Picheyre

Third Line

- Brice Barrere
- Vincent Roigt
- Jean-Batiste Pic
- Florent Ey
- Nicolas Crouilles

Number 8

- Christophe Moreno
- Samir Jnaoui

Scrum-Half

- Guillaume Pull
- Julien Vaquerin-Goze
- Gabriel Cremadeils
- Alexandre Schuster

Fly half

- Mathieu Palau
- Sylvain Jorquera
- Ed Barnes
- Nicolas Garcia

Wings

- Laurent Garcia
- Arnaud Barande
- Damien Villamania
- Benjamin Barcia

Center

- Olivier Benassis
- Laurent Palau
- Vincent Sabardeil

Full-back

- Tom Boyer
- Loic Marty
- Anthony Carrasco
