= Freddie Owsley =

Scottish rugby union player

- Born: 6 January 1997 (age 29) Bristol, England
- Height: 1.93 m (6 ft 4 in)
- Weight: 91 kg (201 lb; 14 st 5 lb)

Rugby union career
- Position: Wing / Fullback
Senior career
Years	Team	Apps	(Points)
2020–2021	Bristol Bears	0	(0)
2021–2022	Edinburgh Rugby	3	(10)
- Correct as of 13 October 2022
Super Rugby
Years	Team	Apps	(Points)
2023	Watsonians	1	(10)
National sevens team
Years	Team		Comps
2022–	Scotland 7s		2 (0)

Freddie Owsley (born 6 January 1997) is an English-born Scotland 7s rugby union player who last played for Edinburgh Rugby in the United Rugby Championship. Owsley's primary position is wing or fullback.

== Rugby Union career ==
=== Professional career ===
A former sprinter, who represented Great Britain U20's in the 200m, 400m, 4 × 100 m and 4 × 400 m, and was crowned national indoor champion in the 400m at U20, Owsley was a member of the Bristol Bears academy, signing a professional contract in May 2020.

He joined Edinburgh Rugby in April 2021, having not made a professional appearance for Bristol, with the intention of playing for Scotland. He made his Edinburgh debut in Round 4 of the 2021–22 EPCR Challenge Cup against Brive, scoring two tries.

In 2022 Owsley was called up to the Scotland Men's 7s squad for the first time ahead of the Toulouse and London legs of the 2021–22 HSBC World Sevens Series. He competed at the 2022 Rugby World Cup Sevens in Cape Town.

In October 2022, Owsley announced his departure from Edinburgh Rugby “to pursue other playing opportunities”.
