= Jonathan Kpoku =

English rugby union player (born 2004)

- Born: 22 June 1999 (age 27)
- Height: 2.02 m (6 ft 8 in)
- Weight: 103 kg (16 st 3 lb; 227 lb)
- Notable relative(s): Joel Kpoku; Junior Kpoku

Rugby union career
- Position: Lock
- Current team: Hino Red Dolphins
Senior career
Years	Team	Apps	(Points)
2018-2021	Saracens	3	(0)
2018-2020	→ Apmthill (loan)		
2021-2022	Coventry RFC		
2022-2024	CS Bourgoin-Jallieu	25	(0)
2024-2026	SC Albi	35	(25)
2026-	Hino Red Dolphins		
- Correct as of 16 March 2024

Jonathan Kpoku (born 22 June 1999) is an English rugby union player who plays as a lock forward for CS Bourgoin-Jallieu.

== Career ==
Kpoku initially played Rugby League for the London Skolars prior to joining the Saracens academy, where he played alongside his twin brother Joel Kpoku. He made his senior debut for Saracens during the 2018–19 season in the Premiership Rugby Cup against Worcester Warriors.

He left Saracens to play on loan for Ampthill for whom he helped gain promotion to the Rugby Championship in 2019, before returning to them on loan the following season. He later signed permanently for Coventry RFC.

He signed for CS Bourgoin-Jallieu in June 2022.

== International career ==
He played for the England national under-20 rugby union team in the 2019 Six Nations Under 20s Championship.

== Personal life ==
His parents are from the Democratic Republic of Congo. He is the older brother of rugby player Junior Kpoku and twin brother of rugby player Joel Kpoku.
