= Argelès-sur-Mer =

Argelès-sur-Mer Argelers (Catalan)
- Commune
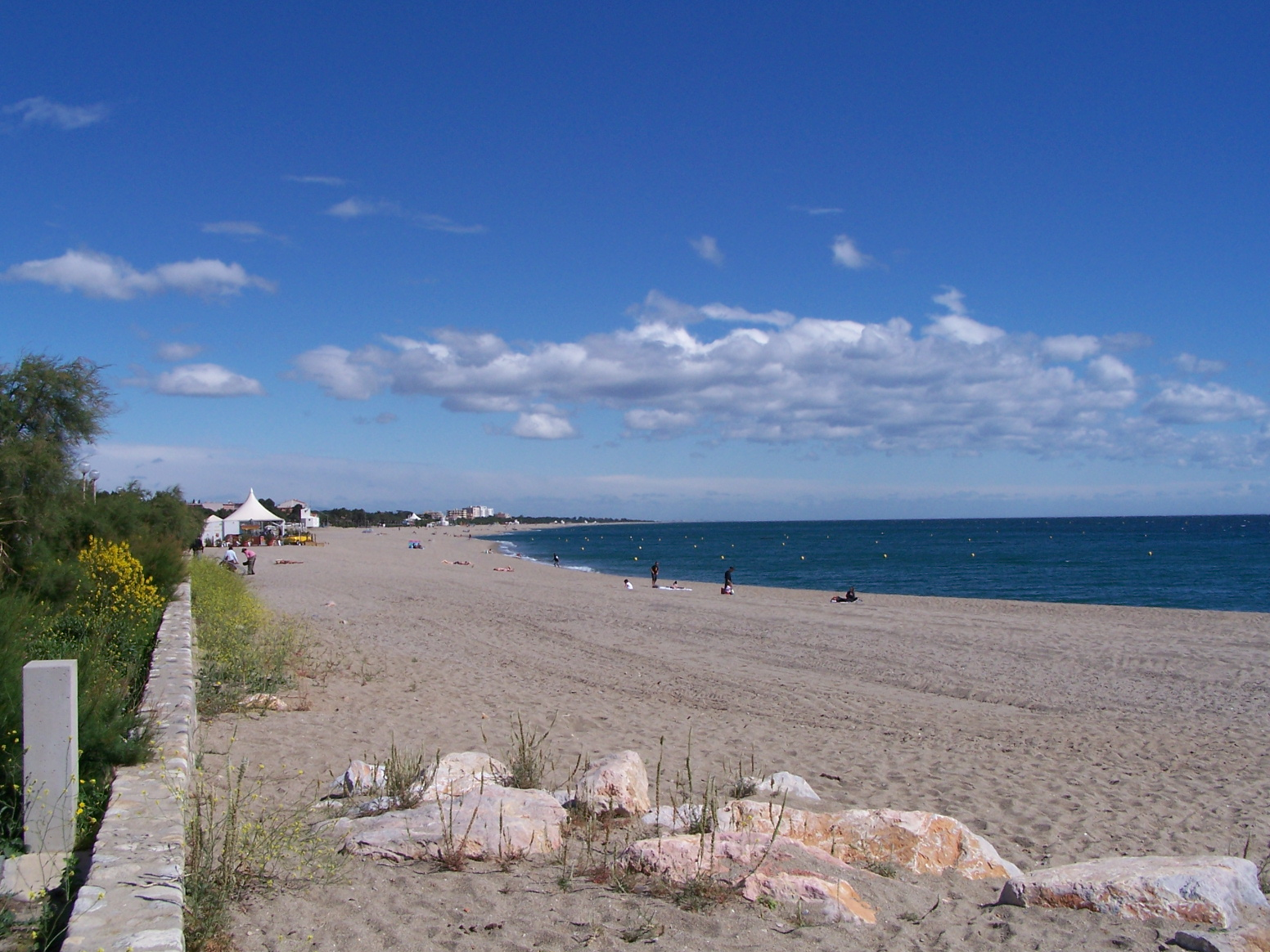
- The beach at Argelès-sur-Mer

- Coat of arms
- Location of Argelès-sur-Mer
- Location within France Location within Occitanie
- Coordinates: 42°32′42″N 3°01′25″E
- Country: France
- Region: Occitania
- Department: Pyrénées-Orientales
- Arrondissement: Céret
- Canton: La Côte Vermeille
- Intercommunality: CC Albères Côte Vermeille Illibéris

Government
  - Mayor (2026–32): Julie Sanz
- Area^{1}: 58.67 km^{2} (22.65 sq mi)
- Elevation: 16 m (52 ft)
- Highest elevation: 1,099 m (3,606 ft)
- Lowest elevation: 0 m (0 ft)
- Population (2023): 10,616
  - Density: 180.9/km^{2} (468.6/sq mi)
- Demonym(s): argelésien (fr) argelerenc (ca)
- Time zone: UTC+01:00 (CET)
  - Summer (DST): UTC+02:00 (CEST)
- INSEE/Postal code: 66008 /66700
- ^{1} French Land Register data, which excludes lakes, ponds, glaciers > 1 km^{2} (0.386 sq mi or 247 acres) and river estuaries.

Argelès-sur-Mer (French: [aʁʒəlɛs syʁ mɛʁ]; Catalan: Argelers de la Marenda [əɾʒəˈlez ðə lə məˈɾendə]; Occitan: Argelers de Mar; lit. 'Argelès on Sea'), commonly known as Argelès (Catalan: Argelers [əɾʒəˈles]), is a commune in the Pyrénées-Orientales department in the administrative region of Occitania, France.

It is about 25 km from Perpignan.

== Geography ==
Argelès-sur-Mer is located in the canton of La Côte Vermeille and in the arrondissement of Céret.

Argelès-sur-Mer is on the Côte Vermeille at the foot of the Albères mountain range, close to the Spanish border. It has the longest beach in the Pyrenées Orientales.

It is part of the Northern Catalan comarca of Rosselló.

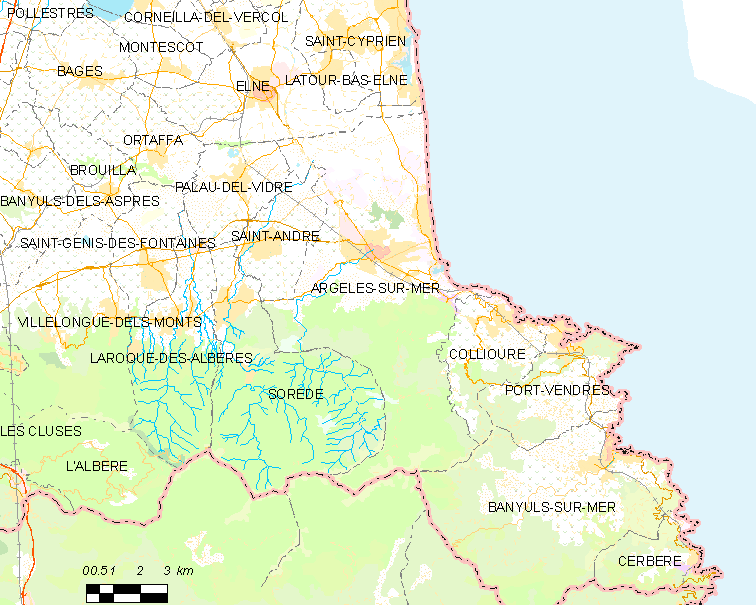
Map of Argelès-sur-Mer and its surrounding communes

== History ==
In 1939, the Argelés concentration camp was created on the beaches near the town. At its peak in March 1939, the camp contained about 100,000 Spaniards, mostly soldiers of the defeated Spanish Republican Army. They were interned next to a windy beach in abysmal sanitary conditions by the French government after the defeat of the Spanish Republic. The refugees streamed to the camp from the winter of 1938/39 after the collapse of the Catalan front following the rebel offensive.

== Government and politics ==
=== Mayors ===
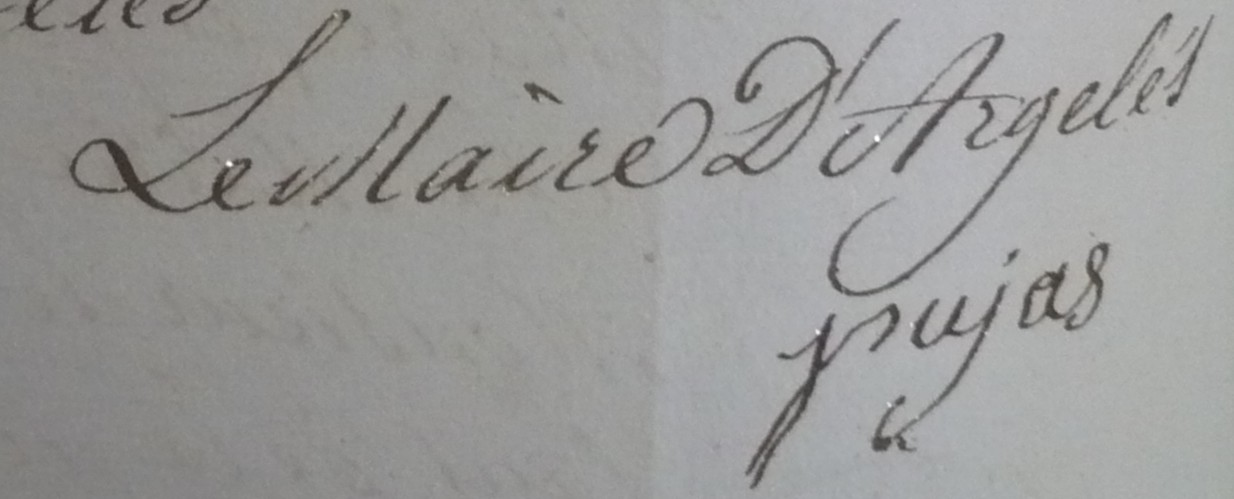
Signature of mayor Paul Pujas in 1815.

Mayor	Term start	Term end
Assiscle Bech	1790	1791
Jean Grando	1791	1793
Joseph Arman	1793	1794
Jean Matignon	1794	1794
Damien Padallé	1794	1796
Bonaventure Verges	1796	1796
François-Xavier Boluix	1796	1798
Joseph Arman	1798	1799
François-Xavier Boluix	1799	1800
Marc Surjus	1800	1813
Côme Ferran	1813	June 1815
Paul Pujas	June 1815	? 1815
Jean Azéma	1815	1816
Isidore Ferrer	1816	1821
Bonaventure Verges	1821	1821
Pierre Padallé	1821	1827
Bonaventure Julia	1827	1829
Joseph Arman	1829	1830
Pierre Padallé	1830	1831
Joseph Arman	1831	1837
Jean Germain Pujol	1837	1840
Alphonse Sebe	1840	1848
François Sine	1848	1848
Assiscle Padallé Bocamy	1848	1848
François Padallé Siné	1848	1848
Thomas Bech	1848	1852
Joseph Azema	1852	1855
Germain Barbie	1855	1865
Côme Ferran Comes	1865	1870
Joseph Baylet	1870	1870
Étienne Pujol	1870	1874
Jacques Lanquine	1874	1876
Étienne Pujol	1876	1877
Michel Moret	1877	1878
Étienne Pujol	1878	1890
Jean Padallé Bocamy	1890	1892
Marc Surjus-Coste	1892	1893
Pierre Moreto	1893	1902
Marc Surjus-Coste	1902	1908
Louis Courtais	1908	1912
Côme Anglade	1912	1914
Vincent Rouzaud	1914	1915
Dieudonné Vinyes	1915	1918
Côme Anglade	1918	1919
Louis Courtais	1919	1922
Frédéric Trescases	1944	1945
Joseph Farre	1945	1947
Germain Farre	1947	1947
Frédéric Trescases	1947	1953
Gaston Pams	1953	1981
Isidore Fourriques	1981	1983
Jean Carrère	1983	2001
Pierre Aylagas	2001	2016
Antoine Parra	2016	2026
Julie Sanz	2026	

== Population and society ==
=== Demography ===
Historical population

Year	Pop.	±% p.a.
1793	847	—
1800	1,064	+3.31%
1806	1,173	+1.64%
1821	1,401	+1.19%
1831	1,478	+0.54%
1836	1,964	+5.85%
1841	2,136	+1.69%
1846	2,251	+1.05%
1851	2,325	+0.65%
1856	2,447	+1.03%
1861	2,456	+0.07%
1866	2,537	+0.65%
1872	2,600	+0.41%
1876	2,833	+2.17%
1881	3,134	+2.04%
1886	3,303	+1.06%
1891	3,413	+0.66%
1896	3,307	−0.63%
1901	3,358	+0.31%

Year	Pop.	±% p.a.
1906	2,913	−2.80%
1911	2,837	−0.53%
1921	2,851	+0.05%
1926	2,835	−0.11%
1931	2,966	+0.91%
1936	2,945	−0.14%
1946	2,968	+0.08%
1954	2,907	−0.26%
1962	3,659	+2.92%
1968	5,022	+5.42%
1975	5,100	+0.22%
1982	5,723	+1.66%
1990	7,188	+2.89%
1999	9,069	+2.62%
2007	9,998	+1.23%
2012	9,901	−0.19%
2017	10,383	+0.96%
2023	10,616	+0.37%

Source: EHESS and INSEE (1968–2023)

=== Sports ===
Étoile sportive catalane is the rugby union club of Argelès-sur-Mer.

== Culture ==
=== Sites of interest ===
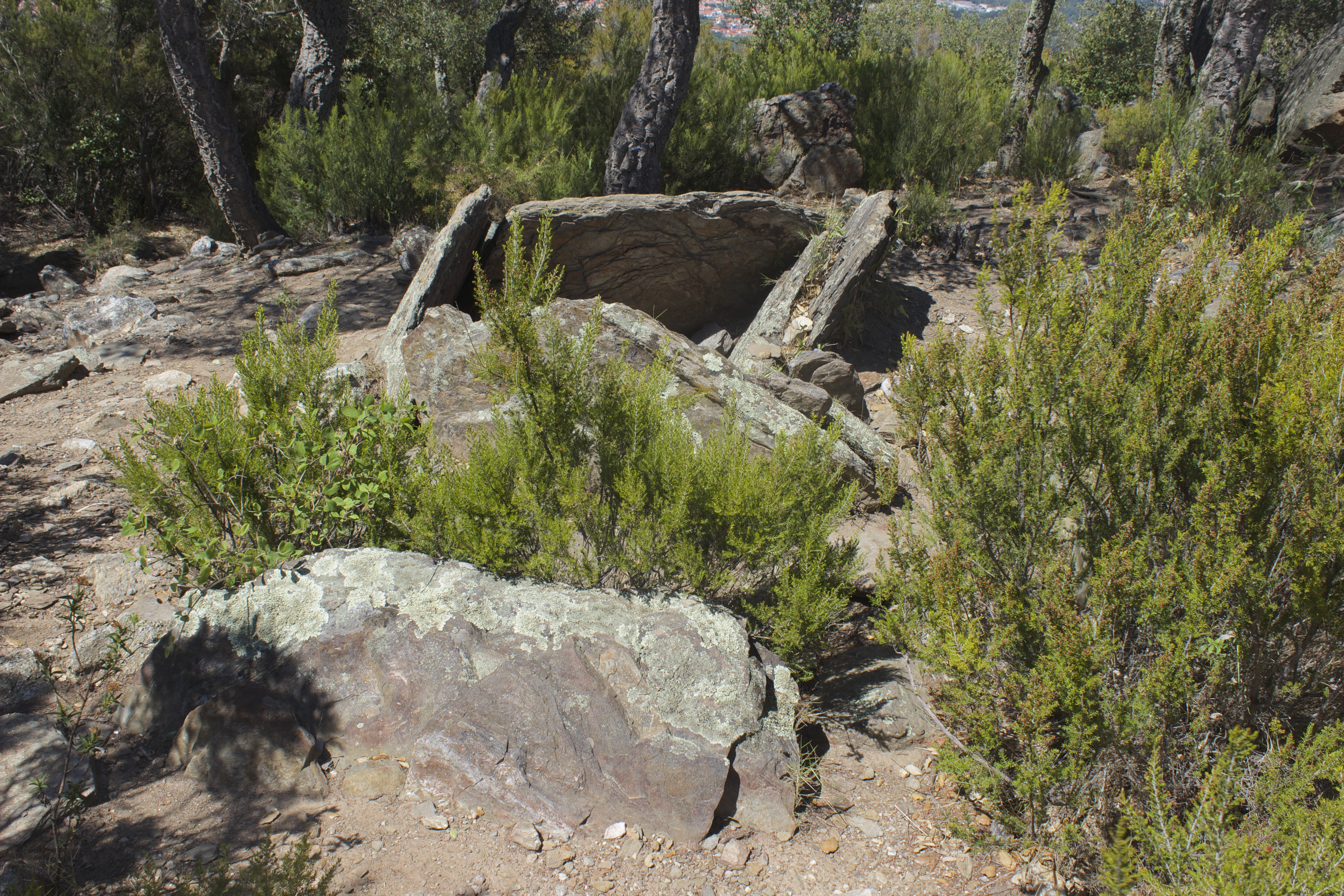
Dolmen of the Collets de Cotlliure

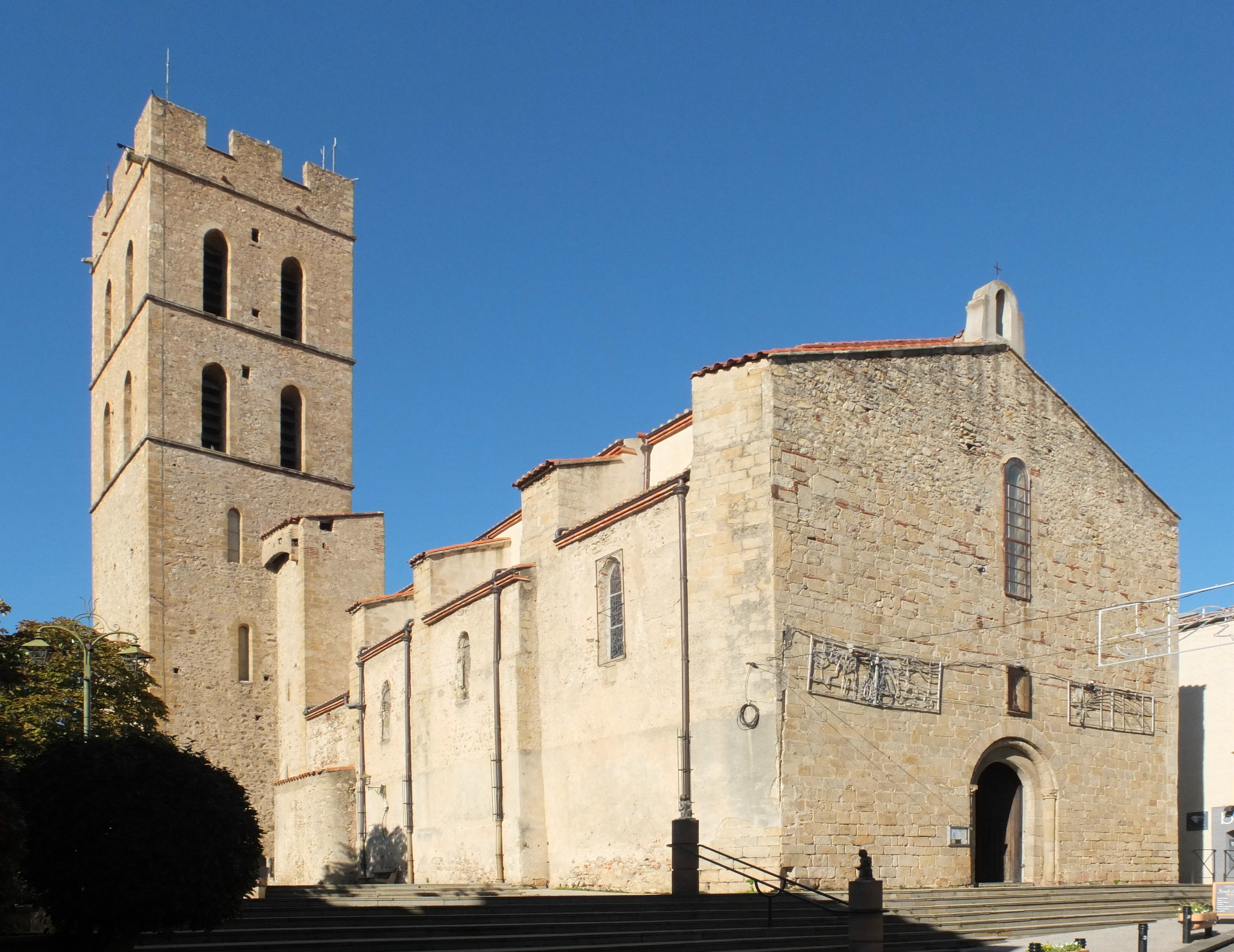
Notre-Dame del Prat

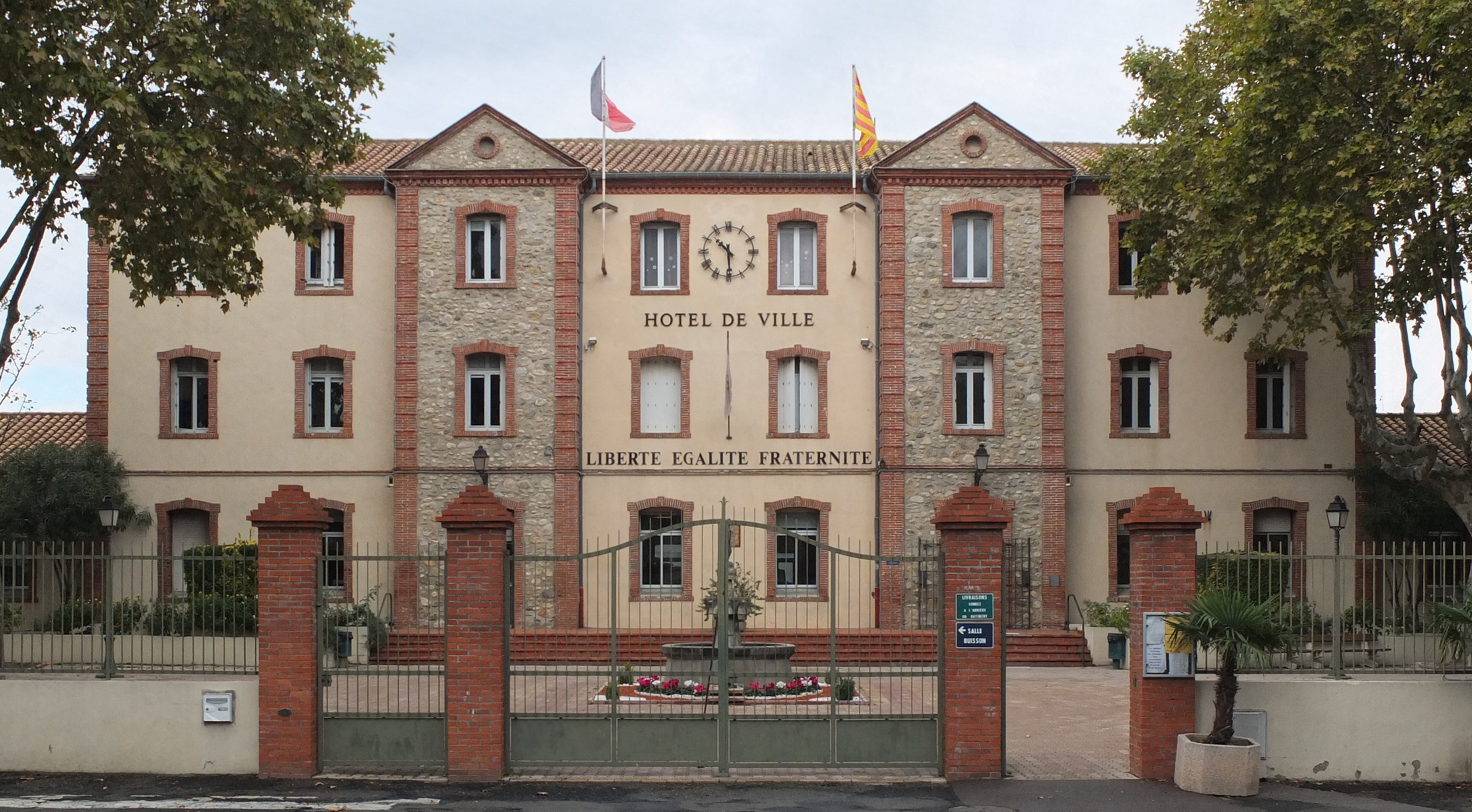
Town hall

Buildings

- Dolmen of the Collets de Cotlliure (Monument historique)
- Dolmen of the Cova de l'Alarb (Monument historique)
- Dolmen of Sant Pere dels Forquets
- Chapel of Saint-Jérôme d'Argelès, from the 10th century
- Church of Saint-Ferréol de la Pava (Monument historique), from the 10th century
- Parish church of Notre-Dame del Prat, from the 14th to the 20th centuries (Monument historique)
- Church of Sainte-Marie de Torreneules, from the 8th to the 10th centuries
- Abbey of Valbonne, from the 13th to the 14th centuries
- Church of Saint-Laurent-du-Mont, from the 12th century (Monument historique)
- Church of Saint-Martin-et-Sainte-Croix, from the 11th or 12th century, and the old village of Taxo d'Avall (both Monument historique)
- Church of Saint-Pierre dels Forquets, pre-romanesque ruins
- Castle of Pujols, from the 13th century (Monument historique)
- Massane tower, in the Albera Massif, from the 13th century
- Castle of Valmy, from the 19th century
- Casa de l'Albera, museum about the Albera Massif

Natural sites

- National nature reserve of the Mas Larrieu
- National nature reserve of the Massane forest
- The Bois des pins is the historical pine forest located near the beach front. Created in the 1860s by the General Council of the Pyrénées-Orientales, it still has to this day over 8,000 centenarian pines.

=== Notable people ===
- Marcelle Narbonne (1898–2012) : supercentenarian who lived and died in Argelès-sur-Mer.
- David Ensor (1906–1987) : British lawyer, actor, author and Labour Party politician, lived and died in Argelès-sur-Mer.
- Marc Lièvremont (1968–) : former rugby union footballer raised in Argelès-sur-Mer and former member of the Étoile sportive catalane club.

== See also ==
- Communes of the Pyrénées-Orientales department
