= 2021–22 EPCR Challenge Cup =

Rugby union competition

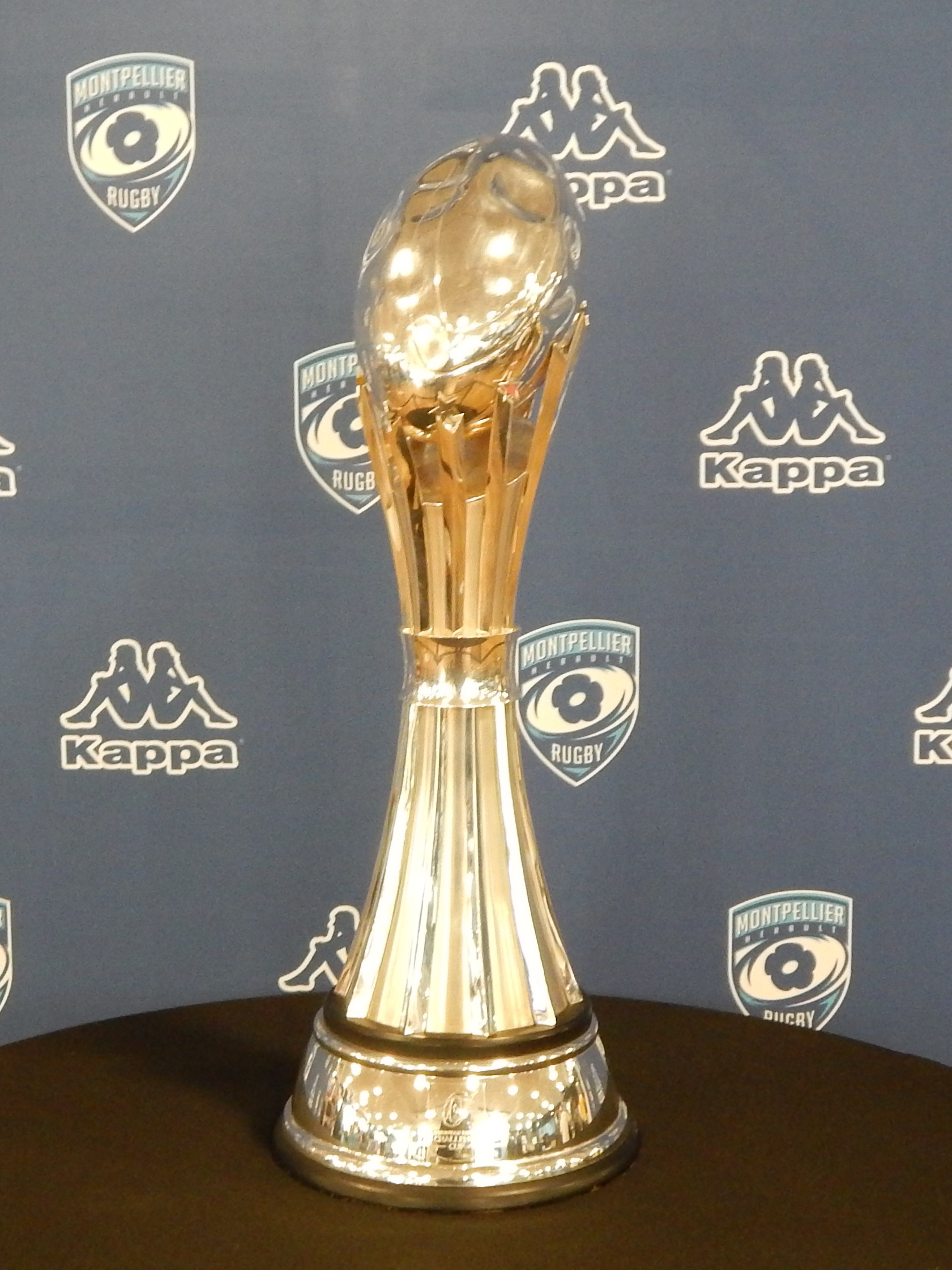
- The EPCR Challenge Cup

Tournament details
- Countries: England; France; Italy; Scotland; Wales
- Tournament format(s): Round-robin and knockout
- Date: 10 December 2021 — 27 May 2022

Tournament statistics
- Teams: 15
- Matches played: 41
- Attendance: 309,980 (7,560 per match)
- Highest attendance: 51,431 - Lyon v Toulon; 27 May 2022
- Lowest attendance: 200 - Zebre v Biarritz; 11 December 2021 (Note: When crowds were in attendance)
- Tries scored: 271 (6.61 per match)
- Top point scorer(s): (France) Léo Berdeu (Lyon); 71 points
- Top try scorer(s): (Argentina) Santiago Socino (Gloucester); 5 tries

Final
- Venue: Stade Vélodrome, Marseille
- Champions: (France) Lyon (1st title)
- Runners-up: (France) Toulon

The 2021–22 EPCR Challenge Cup was the eighth edition of the EPCR Challenge Cup, an annual second-tier rugby union competition for professional clubs. Including the predecessor competition, the original European Challenge Cup, this was the 26th edition of European club rugby's second-tier competition.

Due to the COVID-19 pandemic, the tournament format was changed for the previous season. A similar format remained for this season, however, the number of teams was increased from 14 to 15 and an additional six will join from the Champions Cup.

The tournament commenced in December 2021, and concluded with the final on 27 May 2022 at Stade Vélodrome in Marseille, France.

Lyon, who are in their first European final, won the Challenge Cup by defeating Toulon making it their first European title. It is also their first major title since their Champion de France title in 1933.

== Teams ==
Fifteen teams qualified for the 2021–22 EPCR Cup from Premiership Rugby, the Top 14 and the United Rugby Championship as a direct result of their domestic league performance having not qualified for the Heineken Champions Cup.

The distribution of teams are:

- England: five teams
  - Any teams finishing between 9th and 12th position in the Premiership that do not qualify for the 2020–21 European Champions Cup
  - The champion of the Championship (Saracens)
- France: six teams
  - Any teams finishing between 9th and 12th position in the Top 14 that do not qualify for the 2020–21 European Champions Cup
  - As defending champions Montpellier did not finish in the top 8, the 8th ranked team will also compete in the Challenge Cup
  - The champion of the Pro D2 (Perpignan)
  - The winner of the relegation playoff between the 13th placed team in the Top 14 and the runner-up of the Pro D2 (Biarritz)
- Ireland, Italy, Scotland, Wales: four teams
  - The bottom two sides in each conference from the Pro14

Round	Premiership	Top 14	United Rugby Championship		
	England	France	Italy	Scotland	Wales
Preliminary stage	Gloucester; London Irish; Newcastle Falcons; Saracens; Worcester Warriors	Biarritz; Brive; Lyon; Pau; Perpignan; Toulon	Benetton; Zebre Parma	Edinburgh	Dragons
Transferred from Champions Cup	Bath; Northampton Saints; Wasps	Castres		Glasgow Warriors	Cardiff

=== Team details ===
Team	Coach / Director of Rugby	Captain	Stadium	Capacity	Method of qualification
Entering at Pool stage
(Italy) Benetton	(Italy) Marco Bortolami	(South Africa) Dewaldt Duvenage (Italy) Michele Lamaro	Stadio Comunale di Monigo	6,700	Pro14 Conference B (6th)
(France) Biarritz	(France) Nicolas Nadau	(England) Steffon Armitage	Parc des Sports Aguiléra	15,000	Pro D2 Runner Up
(France) Brive	(Ireland) Jeremy Davidson	(Algeria) Saïd Hireche	Stade Amédée-Domenech	13,979	Top 14 bottom 6 (11th)
(Wales) Dragons	(England) Dean Ryan	(Wales) Rhodri Williams	Rodney Parade	8,700	Pro14 Conference A (5th)
(Scotland) Edinburgh	(Scotland) Mike Blair	(Scotland) Grant Gilchrist (Scotland) Stuart McInally	Edinburgh Rugby Stadium	7,800	Pro14 Conference B (5th)
(England) Gloucester	(England) George Skivington	(England) Lewis Ludlow	Kingsholm Stadium	16,115	Premiership 9th–12th (11th)
(England) London Irish	(Ireland) Declan Kidney	(England) Matt Rogerson	Brentford Community Stadium	17,250	Premiership 9th–12th (9th)
(France) Lyon	(France) Pierre Mignoni	(France) Jean-Marc Doussain	Stade de Gerland	35,000	Top 14 bottom 6 (9th)
(England) Newcastle Falcons	(England) Dean Richards	(England) Micky Young (England) George McGuigan	Kingston Park	10,200	Premiership 9th–12th (10th)
(France) Pau	(France) Thomas Domingo	(France) Quentin Lespiaucq-Brettes	Stade du Hameau	18,324	Top 14 bottom 6 (12th)
(France) Perpignan	(France) Patrick Arlettaz	(France) Mathieu Acebes	Stade Aimé Giral	14,593	Pro D2 Champions
(England) Saracens	(Ireland) Mark McCall	(England) Owen Farrell	StoneX Stadium	10,500	RFU Championship champions
(France) Toulon	(France) Franck Azéma	(France) Raphaël Lakafia	Stade Mayol	18,200	Top 14 bottom 6 (8th)
(England) Worcester Warriors	(South Africa) Alan Solomons	(England) Ted Hill	Sixways Stadium	11,499	Premiership 9th–12th (12th)
(Italy) Zebre	(Argentina) Emiliano Bergamaschi (Replaces (Ireland) Michael Bradley)	(Italy) Giulio Bisegni	Stadio Sergio Lanfranchi	5,000	Pro14 Conference A (6th)
Entering at Knockout Stage (transferred from Champions Cup)
(England) Bath	(England) Stuart Hooper	(England) Charlie Ewels	The Recreation Ground	14,509	Champions Cup Pool A 9th–11th (11th)
(Wales) Cardiff Rugby	(Wales) Dai Young	(Wales) Josh Turnbull	Cardiff Arms Park	12,125	Champions Cup Pool b 9th–11th (9th)
(France) Castres	(Argentina) Mauricio Reggiardo	(France) Mathieu Babillot	Stade Pierre-Fabre	12,500	Champions Cup Pool B 9th–11th (11th)
(Scotland) Glasgow Warriors	(England) Danny Wilson	(Scotland) Fraser Brown (Scotland) Ryan Wilson	Scotstoun Stadium	7,351	Champions Cup Pool A 9th–11th (9th)
(England) Northampton Saints	(New Zealand) Chris Boyd	(England) Lewis Ludlam	Franklin's Gardens	15,200	Champions Cup Pool A 9th–11th (10th)
(England) Wasps	(England) Lee Blackett	(England) Joe Launchbury	Ricoh Arena	32,609	Champions Cup Pool b 9th–11th (10th)

== Pool stage ==
Key to colours
Winner, runner-up and third of each pool, advance to round of 16.
The highest-scoring fourth-place team also advance to round of 16.

=== Pool A ===
Pos	Team	Pld	W	D	L	PF	PA	PD	TF	TA	TB	LB	Pts
1	(France) Toulon	4	3	0	1	107	57	+50	13	7	3	1	16
2	(England) Newcastle Falcons	4	3	0	1	73	89	−16	10	10	2	0	14
3	(France) Biarritz	4	2	1	1	59	47	+12	8	4	1	1	12
4	(England) Worcester Warriors	4	1	1	2	85	91	−6	11	12	2	1	9
5	(Italy) Zebre Parma	4	0	0	4	75	115	−40	8	17	1	1	2

=== Pool B ===
Pos	Team	Pld	W	D	L	PF	PA	PD	TF	TA	TB	LB	Pts
1	(France) Lyon	4	4	0	0	122	57	+65	14	5	2	0	18
2	(England) Gloucester	4	3	0	1	161	84	+77	23	10	3	1	16
3	(Italy) Benetton	4	2	0	2	75	95	−20	9	12	0	0	8
4	(France) Perpignan	4	1	0	3	54	138	−84	7	18	0	0	4
5	(Wales) Dragons	4	0	0	4	74	112	−38	7	15	0	2	2

=== Pool C ===
Pos	Team	Pld	W	D	L	PF	PA	PD	TF	TA	TB	LB	Pts
1	(Scotland) Edinburgh	4	3	0	1	161	47	+114	22	6	2	1	15
2	(England) London Irish	4	2	1	1	78	82	−4	12	11	2	0	12
3	(England) Saracens	4	2	0	2	118	78	+40	17	11	2	1	11
4	(France) Brive	4	1	1	2	41	146	−105	4	21	0	0	6
5	(France) Pau	4	1	0	3	75	120	−45	10	16	1	0	5

== Knock Out Stage ==
=== Seeding for knockout stage ===
Seed	Pool Leaders	Pts	Diff	TF
1	(France) Lyon	18	+65	14
2	(France) Toulon	16	+50	13
3	(Scotland) Edinburgh	15	+114	22
Seed	Pool Runners–up	Pts	Diff	TF
4	(England) Gloucester Rugby	16	+77	23
5	(England) Newcastle Falcons	14	–16	10
6	(England) London Irish	12	–4	12
Seed	Pool Third placed	Pts	Diff	TF
7	(France) Biarritz Olympique	12	+12	8
8	(England) Saracens	11	+40	17
9	(Italy) Benetton	8	–20	9
Seed	Best fourth placed	Pts	Diff	TF
10	(England) Worcester Warriors	9	–6	11
–	(France) Brive	6	–105	4
–	(France) Perpignan	4	–84	7
Seed	Heineken Champions Cup (17–22)	Pts	Diff	TF
11 – HCC 1	(Wales) Cardiff	7	–33	13
12 – HCC 2	(England) Wasps	6	–51	6
13 – HCC 3	(France) Castres Olympique	5	–14	9
14 – HCC 4	(Scotland) Glasgow Warriors	5	–35	7
15 – HCC 5	(England) Northampton Saints	2	–68	6
16 – HCC 6	(England) Bath	2	–100	6

=== Bracket ===
Round of 16
1	(France) Lyon	31
10	(England) Worcester Warriors	17
5	(England) Newcastle Falcons	17
14	(Scotland) Glasgow Warriors	27
3	(Scotland) Edinburgh	41
16	(England) Bath	19
7	(France) Biarritz Olympique	29
12	(England) Wasps	39
2	(France) Toulon	36
9	(Italy) Benetton	17
6	(England) London Irish	64
13	(France) Castres	17
4	(England) Gloucester	31
15	(England) Northampton Saints	21
8	(England) Saracens	40
11	(Wales) Cardiff	33

Quarter-finals
1	(France) Lyon	35
14	(Scotland) Glasgow Warriors	27
3	(Scotland) Edinburgh	30
12	(England) Wasps	34
2	(France) Toulon	19
6	(England) London Irish	18
4	(England) Gloucester	15
8	(England) Saracens	44

Semi-finals
1	(France) Lyon	20
12	(England) Wasps	18
2	(France) Toulon	25
8	(England) Saracens	16

Final
1	(France) Lyon	30
2	(France) Toulon	12

=== Round of 16 ===
15 April 2022
17:30 BST

London Irish (England)	64–27	(France) Castres
Try: Creevy (2) 6' c, 24' c Rona 17' m Pearson 34' c González 37' c Rowe 39' c Rogerson 71' m Joseph 75' c Cornish 78' c Janse van Rensburg 79' m Con: Jackson (7/10) 7', 25', 35', 38', 40', 77', 79'	Report	Try: Kockott 45' c Chabouni 54' c Arata 58' c Con: Botica (3/3) 46', 55', 59'; Pen: Botica (2/2) 21', 67'

Brentford Community Stadium
Attendance: 1,000
Referee: Andrea Piardi (Italy)

15 April 2022
19:00 CEST

Biarritz Olympique (France)	29–39	(England) Wasps
Try: Peyresblanques 28' m Hirigoyen 42' c Armitage 57' c Soury 68' c Con: Bosch (3/4) 43', 58', 68'; Pen: Bosch (1/1) 14'	Report	Try: Umaga 11' m Barbeary (3) 14' c, 22' c, 75' c Robson 26' c Con: Gopperth (4/5) 15', 23', 27', 76'; Pen: Gopperth (2/2) 9', 62'

Parc des Sports Aguiléra
Attendance: 4,000
Referee: Chris Busby (Ireland)

15 April 2022
21:00 CEST

Lyon (France)	31–17	(England) Worcester Warriors
Try: Couilloud 4' c R. Taofifénua 15' c Devisme 47' c Barassi 76' c Con: Sopoaga (3/3) 5', 16', 48'; Berdeu (1/1) 78'; Pen: Berdeu (1/1) 57'	Report	Try: Howe 2' m Hill 50' m Searle 75' c Con: Searle (1/3) 76'

Matmut Stadium de Gerland
Attendance: 10,500
Referee: Gianluca Gnecchi (Italy)

15 April 2022
20:00 BST

Newcastle Falcons (England)	17–27	(Scotland) Glasgow Warriors
Try: Montgomery 51' c Hodgson 65' c Con: Connon (1/1) 52'; Hodgson (1/1) 66'; Pen: Connon (1/1) 27'	Report	Try: Matthews 3' c Steyn (2) 6' m, 57' m McKay 31' c Con: Thompson (2/4) 4', 32'; Pen: Thompson (1/2) 62'

Kingston Park
Attendance: 4,121
Referee: Tual Trainini (France)

16 April 2022
20:00 BST

Edinburgh (Scotland)	41–19	(England) Bath
Try: Boffelli (2) 10' m, 62' c Kinghorn 31' c Schoeman 52' c Bennett 68' m Boyle 78' c Con: Boffelli (4/6) 31', 53', 64', 79'; Pen: Boffelli (1/1) 22'	Report	Try: Underhill (2) 1' c, 25' m B. Spencer 34' c Con: Bailey (1/2) 2'; B. Spencer (1/1) 35'

DAM Health Stadium
Attendance: 5,071
Referee: Ludovic Cayre (France)

16 April 2022
20:00 BST

Gloucester (England)	31–21	(England) Northampton Saints
Try: Thorley 4' c Rapava-Ruskin 7' c Alemanno 21' c Socino 46' c Con: Hastings (4/4) 5', 8', 22', 47'; Pen: Hastings (1/1) 54'	Report	Try: Augustus 32' c Hutchinson 38' c Haywood 66' c Con: Biggar (2/2) 33', 39'; Furbank (1/1) 67'

Kingsholm
Attendance: 9,000
Referee: Sam Grove-White (Scotland)

16 April 2022
21:00 CEST

Toulon (France)	36–17	(Italy) Benetton
Try: Villière 7' c Ollivon 27' c Coulon 78' c Con: Carbonel (3/3) 8', 28', 80'; Pen: Carbonel (5/6) 37', 62', 67', 72', 76'	Report	Try: Menoncello 52' c Ioane 60' c Con: Smith (2/2) 53', 61'; Pen: Smith (1/1) 4'

Stade Mayol
Attendance: 5,000
Referee: Karl Dickson (England)

17 April 2022
13:00 BST

Saracens (England)	40–33	(Wales) Cardiff
Try: Morris 36' c Maitland (2) 51' c, 57' m Davies 63' m Malins 69' c Con: Farrell (3/5) 37', 52', 70'; Pen: Farrell (3/3) 14', 24', 31'	Report	Try: T. Williams 40' c Lane 48' c Carré 74' c Con: Priestland (2/2) 40+1', 49'; J. Evans (1/1) 75'; Pen: Priestland (4/5) 8', 32', 55', 60'

StoneX Stadium
Attendance: 9,000
Referee: Pierre Brousset (France)

=== Quarter-finals ===
6 May 2022
20:00 BST

Gloucester (England)	15–44	(England) Saracens
Try: Singleton 30' m Rees-Zammit 73' c Con: Twelvetrees (1/1) 74'; Pen: Hastings (1/1) 44'	Report	Try: Davies 8' c Itoje 47' c Tompkins 51' c George 61' c Taylor 71' c Con: Farrell (5/5) 9', 48', 52', 62', 72'; Pen: Farrell (3/3) 5', 18', 36'

Kingsholm Stadium
Attendance: 9,000
Referee: Frank Murphy (Ireland)

7 May 2022
12:30 BST

Edinburgh (Scotland)	30–34	(England) Wasps
Try: Vellacott 12' c McBurney 25' c Bradbury 66' c Con: Boffelli (3/3) 13', 26', 66'; Pen: Boffelli (3/3) 9', 42', 73'	Report	Try: Gopperth 15' c Alo 43' c West 57' c Barbeary 75' c Con: Gopperth (4/4) 16', 44', 58', 77'; Pen: Gopperth (2/2) 7', 49'

DAM Health Stadium
Attendance: 6,431
Referee: Pierre Brousset (France)

7 May 2022
21:00 CEST

Lyon (France)	35–27	(Scotland) Glasgow Warriors
Try: Couilloud 35' c R. Taofifénua 55' c Niniashvili (2) 61' m, 75' c Con: Berdeu (2/3) 36', 76'; Doussain (1/1) 57'; Pen: Berdeu (3/4) 1', 12', 70'	Report	Try: McKay 5' c Forbes 39' c Penalty try 49'; Con: Thompson (2/2) 6', 40'; Pen: Thompson (2/2) 23', 27'

Stade de Gerland
Attendance: 28,000
Referee: Matthew Carley (England)

8 May 2022
13:30 CEST

Toulon (France)	19–18	(England) London Irish
Try: Ollivon 59' c Con: Carbonel (1/1) 59'; Pen: Carbonel (4/5) 36', 40', 43', 66'	Report	Try: Tuisue 8' c Arundell 73' m Con: Jackson (1/2) 10'; Pen: Jackson (2/3) 4', 62'

Stade Mayol
Attendance: 11,300
Referee: Sam Grove-White (Scotland)

=== Semi-finals ===
14 May 2022
13:30 CEST

Lyon (France)	20–18	(England) Wasps
Try: Berdeu 46' c Charcosset 53' c Con: Berdeu (2/2) 48', 54'; Pen: Berdeu (2/4) 35', 64'	Report	Try: Robson 23' m Gopperth 73' c Con: Gopperth (1/2) 74'; Pen: Gopperth (2/2) 38', 51'

Stade de Gerland
Attendance: 10,525
Referee: Frank Murphy (Ireland)

14 May 2022
21:00 CEST

Toulon (France)	25–16	(England) Saracens
Try: Villière (2) 2' c, 39' m Wainiqolo 60' c Con: Carbonel (2/3) 4', 61'; Pen: Carbonel (1/2) 33'	Report	Try: Earl 15' c Con: Farrell (1/1) 17'; Pen: Farrell (3/4) 12', 26', 58'

Stade Mayol
Attendance: 13,368
Referee: Andrew Brace (Ireland)

=== Final ===
27 May 2022
21:00

Lyon (France)	30–12	(France) Toulon
Try: Couilloud 7' c Penalty try 45'; Barassi 47' c Con: Berdeu (2/2) 9', 49'; Pen: Berdeu (2/3) 20', 59'; Ngatai (1/1) 70'	Report	Try: Serin 16' c Kolbe 73' m Con: Carbonel (1/1) 17'; Kolbe (0/1)

Stade Vélodrome, Marseille
Attendance: 51,431
Referee: Luke Pearce (England)

== See also ==
- 2021–22 European Rugby Champions Cup
