= Junior Kpoku =

English rugby union player (born 2004)

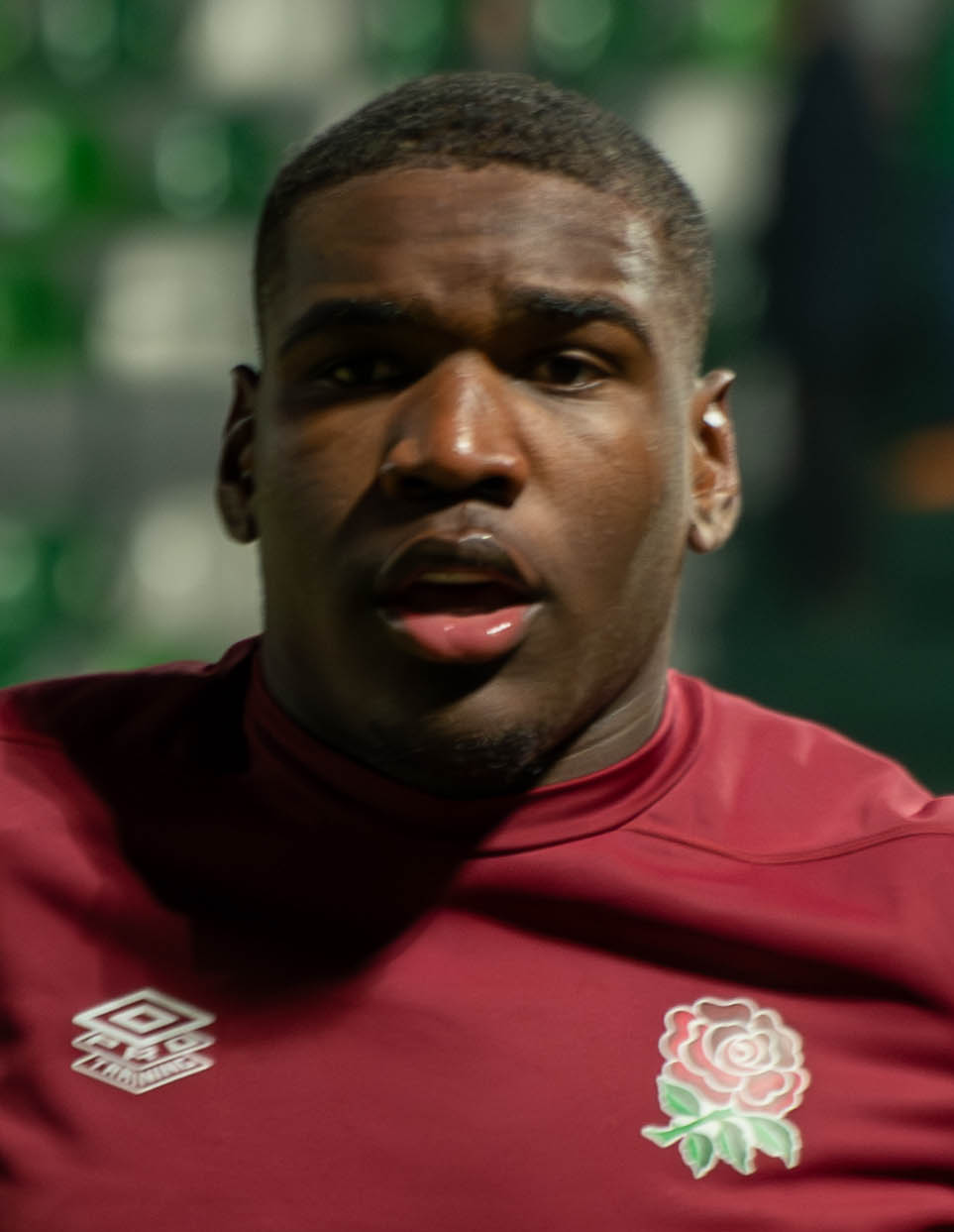
- Born: 10 September 2005 (age 21)
- Height: 2.04 m (6 ft 8 in)
- Weight: 119 kg (18 st 10 lb; 262 lb)
- School: Finborough School
- Notable relative(s): Joel Kpoku; Jonathan Kpoku

Rugby union career
- Position: Lock
- Current team: Racing 92
Senior career
Years	Team	Apps	(Points)
2023–2026	Racing 92	27	(0)
2026	→ (loan) Toulon	13	(0)
2026–	Toulon	7	(10)
- Correct as of 5 November 2026
International career
Years	Team	Apps	(Points)
2022–	England U20	16	(0)
- Correct as of 16 January 2026

Junior Kpoku (born 10 September 2005) is an English rugby union player who plays for Top 14 club Toulon. He has played for the England national under-20 rugby union team.

== Early life ==
He attended Finborough School near Stowmarket, with whom he reached the National U18s Cup semi-final in 2023. And he also attended Ashmole Academy in Southgate in north London.

== Career ==
Kpoku was a member of the Saracens academy. He signed with Exeter Chiefs in August 2023. However, He signed with Racing 92 in October 2023 only a couple of months after having joined Exeter Chiefs due to family reasons. He made his Top 14 debut in the Paris derby against Stade Français Paris in February 2024.

In January 2026, signed for Toulon on loan until the end of the 2025–26 season. In June 2026, he signed a permanent deal with Toulon lasting until 2029.

In November 2026, he scored a last minute try to win the game during a 25–24 victory against Perpignan.

== International career ==
He was a member of the England national under-20 rugby union team which won the 2024 Six Nations Under 20s Championship. He was also part of the England U20 side that won the 2024 World Rugby U20 Championship in South Africa.

In June 2025, he was named in the England U20 squad for the 2025 World Rugby U20 Championship.

== Personal life ==
His parents are from the Democratic Republic of Congo. He is the younger brother of rugby players Jonathan Kpoku and Joel Kpoku.
