= Luca Andreani =

Italian rugby union player

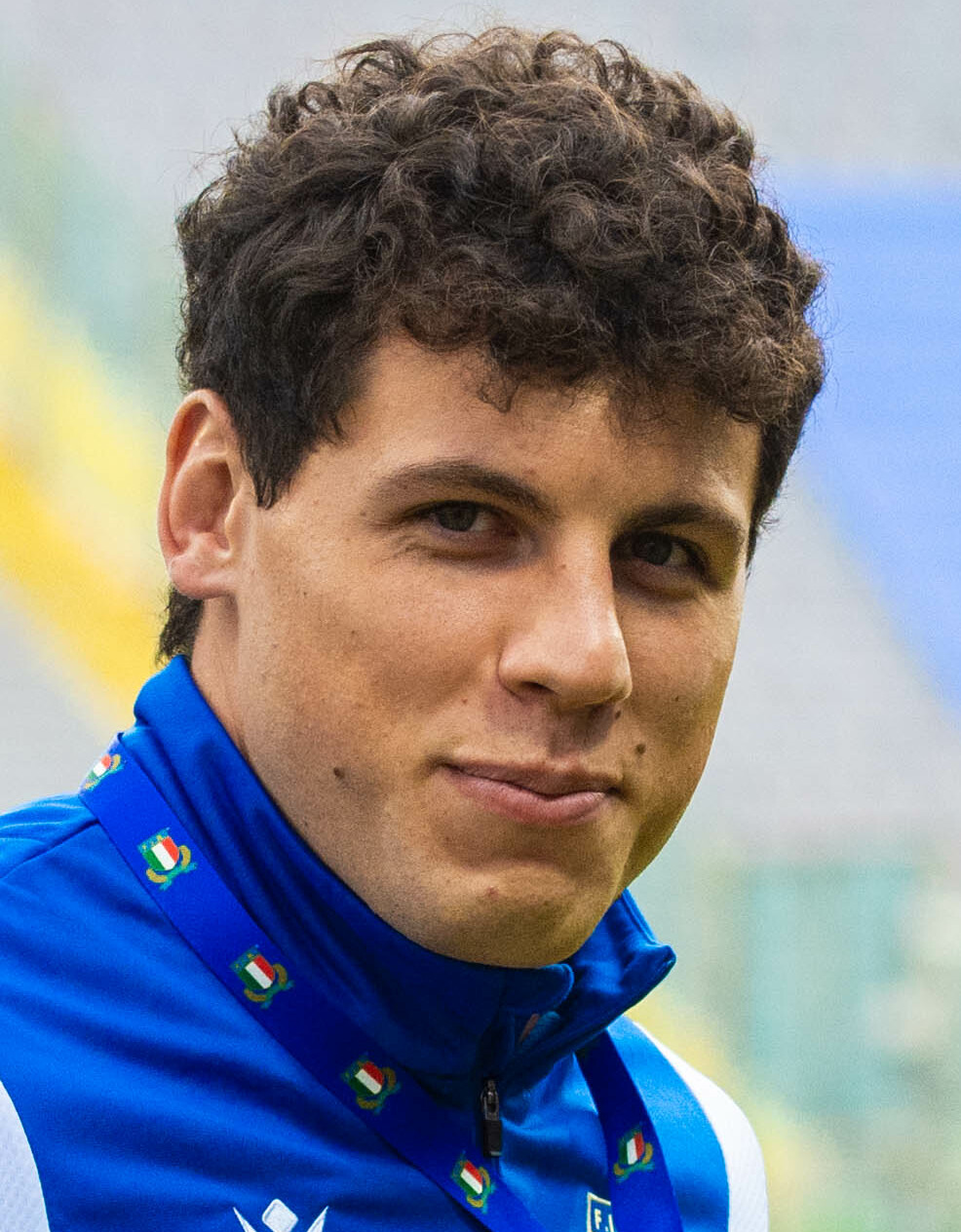
- Andreani in 2022
- Born: 19 April 2001 (age 25) Manerbio, Italy
- Height: 190 cm (6 ft 3 in)
- Weight: 103 kg (227 lb; 16 st 3 lb)

Rugby union career
- Position: Flanker
- Current team: Fiamme Oro
Youth career
- Bassa Bresciana Rugby
Senior career
Years	Team	Apps	(Points)
2019–2020	F.I.R. Academy		
2021–2025	Zebre Parma	40	(15)
2025–	Fiamme Oro		
- Correct as of 24 Dec 2022
International career
Years	Team	Apps	(Points)
2020–2021	Italy U20	7	(5)
- Correct as of 12 Nov 2022

Luca Andreani (born 19 April 2001) is an Italian professional rugby union player who primarily plays flanker for Fiamme Oro in the Italian Serie A Elite.

== Professional career ==
Andreani previously played for clubs such as Bassa Bresciana. He signed for Zebre in July 2021 ahead of the 2021–22 United Rugby Championship. He made his debut in Round 3 of the 2021–22 season against the Leinster. He played with Zebre Parma until 2025.

In 2020 and 2021, Andreani was named in Italy U20s squad for the annual Six Nations Under 20s Championship. On 30 November 2023, he was called in Italy Under 23 squad for test series against IRFU Combined Academies.
