= Patrick Arlettaz =

France international rugby union player & coach (born 1972)

- Full name: Patrick Arlettaz
- Born: 4 April 1972 (age 54) Perpignan, France
- Height: 6 ft 0 in (183 cm)
- Weight: 186 lb (84 kg)

Rugby union career
- Position: Centre
Senior career
Years	Team	Apps	(Points)
1992–1996	Perpignan		
1996–2001	Narbonne		
2001–2006	Montpellier		
2006–2007	ES Catalane		
International career
Years	Team	Apps	(Points)
1995	France	1	(10)
Coaching career
- Years: Team
- 2005–2006: Montpellier (assistant)
- 2006–2008: ES Catalane
- 2008–2011: Narbonne (backs)
- 2012–2014: Perpignan (assistant)
- 2016–2019: Perpignan (assistant)
- 2019–2023: Perpignan
- 2023–: France (backs)

Patrick Arlettaz (born 4 April 1972) is a French rugby union coach and former player.

Born in Perpignan, Arlettaz played as a centre and was capped once for the France national team in 1995. His appearance came against Romania at Tucuman as part of the Argentina-hosted Latin Cup and he scored two tries. He spent his career with USA Perpignan, RC Narbonne, Montpellier RC and ES Catalane, before retiring as a player in 2007.

Arlettaz became head coach of USA Perpignan for the 2020–21 season and immediately led them to the Rugby Pro D2 championship title, thus gaining promotion to the Top 14. He coached the club for two seasons in the Top 14, then in 2023 moved onto a role with the national team, replacing Laurent Labit as attack coach post the World Cup.

== See also ==
- List of France national rugby union players
