= Léo Berdeu =

French rugby union player

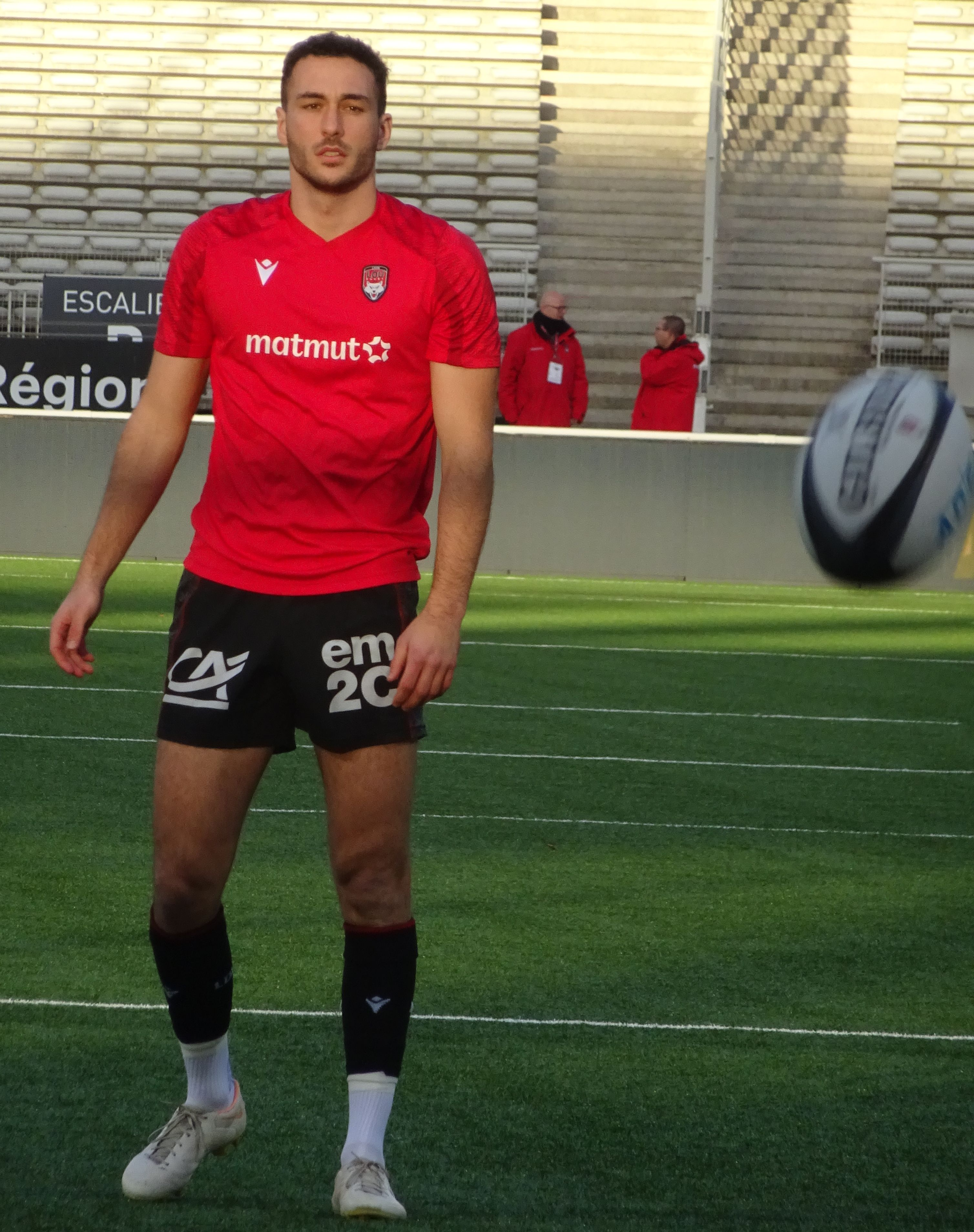
- Born: 13 June 1998 (age 28) Cannes, France
- Height: 1.95 m (6 ft 5 in)
- Weight: 99 kg (218 lb; 15 st 8 lb)

Rugby union career
- Position(s): Fly-half, Fullback
- Current team: Lyon
Senior career
Years	Team	Apps	(Points)
2016–	Lyon	120	(1017)
2018–2020	→ Agen (loan)	45	(213)
- Correct as of 25 March 2025

Léo Berdeu (born 13 June 1998) is a French professional rugby union player who plays as a fly-half for Top 14 club Lyon.

== Professional career ==
He was first selected for the French national rugby team in January 2022, for the following Six Nations tournament.
